= List of Gomer Pyle – USMC episodes =

Gomer Pyle – USMC is an American situation comedy created by Aaron Ruben that originally aired on CBS from September 25, 1964, to May 2, 1969. The series was a spinoff of The Andy Griffith Show, and the pilot episode was introduced as the final fourth-season episode which aired on May 18, 1964. The show ran for five seasons, with a total of 150 half-hour episodes, 30 in black-and-white and 120 in color. Despite the series' positive reception (the show remained in the Top 10 Nielsen ratings for all five seasons), Nabors quit because he desired to move to something else, 'reach for another rung on the ladder, either up or down'. In 2006, CBS began releasing the show on DVD; the last season was released in November 2008.

Set in California (originally in North Carolina), it stars Jim Nabors as sweet-but-naive private Gomer Pyle, Frank Sutton as Gomer's hard-nosed and irritable sergeant (and later in the series, best friend) Vince Carter, and Ronnie Schell as Pyle's friend, Duke Slater. Though military-themed, the show never discussed the Vietnam War and instead focused on the relationship between Gomer and Sergeant Carter. The series is mostly episodic in format; with the exception of a few story arcs, self-contained plots play out before the episode concludes.

== Series overview ==
Season	Episodes	Originally released		Rank	Rating
Season	Episodes	First released	Last released	Rank	Rating
Pilot	1	May 18, 1964		—N/a	—N/a
1	30	September 25, 1964	April 16, 1965	3	30.7
2	30	September 17, 1965	April 15, 1966	2	27.8
3	30	September 14, 1966	April 12, 1967	10	22.8 (Note: Tied with The Virginian, The Lawrence Welk Show, and The Ed Sullivan Show)
4	30	September 8, 1967	April 12, 1968	3	25.6
5	30	September 27, 1968	May 2, 1969	2	27.2

== Episodes ==
=== Pilot (1964) ===
The pilot was an episode of The Andy Griffith Show. "No. overall" and "No. in season" for the pilot indicate the airing and location of the episode within the parent series. The pilot was shot in black-and-white.

No. overall	No. in season	Title	Directed by	Written by	Original release date
127	32	"Gomer Pyle – USMC"	Aaron Ruben	Aaron Ruben	May 18, 1964
In this backdoor pilot for the spin-off series Gomer Pyle-USMC, Gomer tells Andy that he has enlisted in the Marines. Gomer reads off a list of prominent Marines including a General Lucius Pyle. Gomer tells Andy he has to report the next day. Andy warns Gomer how tough it is in the Marines. Andy offers to drop Gomer off at the base. Andy and Gomer arrive late to the base. Sergeant Vince Carter (Frank Sutton) is going through roll call and notices Gomer is not there. Gomer explains why they were late and Carter assigns him to KP duty. Gomer interrupts Carter and Carter makes him sing with a bucket on his head. In the barracks, Andy checks up on Gomer from a window. Gomer gets in trouble. Carter tells the men about an inspection coming up. One of the men (Eddie Ryder) pulls a practical joke on Gomer and gets him to wear Carter's Dress Blue uniform. Andy finds Gomer sitting alone in the barracks with a bucket on his head. Andy tells Gomer it will get tougher in the Marines. In a bar, Andy hears Carter telling some other officers about Gomer and about how Gomer won't last. Andy leads Carter to believe that Gomer is General Lucius Pyle's son. Carter now works extra hard to make sure Gomer passes the inspection. Colonel Watson (Frank Albertson) comes by and Gomer passes the inspection. Carter learns from Watson that Lucius doesn't have a son. Karl Lukas as Sergeant. Dick Tyler as Private Hemsley.

=== Season 1 (1964–65) ===
- All episodes of the first season were shot in black and white.

No. overall	No. in season	Title	Directed by	Written by	Original release date
1	1	"Gomer Overcomes the Obstacle Course"	Aaron Ruben	Aaron Ruben	September 25, 1964
Sgt. Carter tells his new recruits that he's had three Honor Platoons and he intends to get a fourth. Gomer has a hard time with the obstacle course. This could ruin Carter's chance at a fourth Honor Platoon. Pvt. Duke Slater (Ronnie Schell) cannot believe that Gomer actually likes Carter. During the night, Gomer goes to the course to practice, but things still do not go well. Gomer sleeps the whole next day and Carter wants to know why. The next night, Gomer does much better on the course. Lieutenant Colonel Van Pelt (Peter Hansen) sees him and Gomer explains what he's doing. Gomer again sleeps the day away. Carter has had enough and goes to Van Pelt to complain about Gomer. Van Pelt tells Carter what Gomer was doing and compliments both Carter and Gomer. Carter tells the men in the barracks to keep the noise down so Gomer can sleep. Buck Young as Sergeant Whipple. Mark Slade as Private Eddie Swanson. Jerry Dexter as Corporal Johnson.
2	2	"Guest in the Barracks"	Coby Ruskin	Bob Ross	October 2, 1964
Sgt. Carter thinks that Gomer's gaining too much weight. But he's actually smuggling food to give to depressed Pvt. Joey Lombardi (Joe E. Tata). Joey had a fight with his girl Rosemary before he left for camp. Rosemary comes to the base to make up with Joey, but Col. Van Pelt cannot let her in. As it is Sunday, Carter wants the men to go out and have some fun. Joey asks Carter if he can stay behind, claiming to be ill. Gomer sees a woman standing outside the camp fence. He finds out that it is Rosemary. Gomer sneaks her into the barracks to see Joey and they make up. The men come back and Duke tells Gomer that they will get in trouble because of Rosemary. Carter is coming and the men hide Rosemary under a bunk. Gomer tries to sneak her out of camp, but somehow he loses her. Rosemary winds up in Carter's office and he finds her in one of his lockers. Gomer and Joey explain who Rosemary is. Carter wants the men to help him try to get her off base before anyone else sees her. Because of Lieutenant Norris (Robert Hogan), their first attempt doesn't work. Gomer comes up with a plan that works.
3	3	"Private Ralph Skunk"	Coby Ruskin	Aaron Ruben	October 9, 1964
Gomer shows Sgt. Carter that Sgt. Whipple is trying to sabatoge their inspection. While on a hike, the platoon is stopped by a snake in the road. Carter is about to shoot it, when Gomer picks it up and says it is not poisonous. The men are taking a break and Gomer befriends a skunk. He names the skunk Ralph because he looks like Gomer's Uncle Ralph. Back at the barracks, Carter blames Gomer's playing with the animals as the reason they didn't beat Whipple's platoon hike time. Ralph the skunk followed Gomer back to the barracks. Carter doesn't want the skunk to ruin his inspection, so he says he's taking Ralph out and shooting him. Despite the men hearing a gun shot, Carter didn't kill the skunk. Carter tells Gomer to keep Ralph out of sight. Whipple sabotages Carter's next inspection. Gomer uses Ralph to ruin Whipple's next inspection, making Carter extremely happy. One their next hike, Gomer sets Ralph free in the woods.
4	4	"Captain Ironpants"	Coby Ruskin	Garry Marshall & Jerry Belson	October 16, 1964
Gomer tips his hat instead of saluting female Captain Martin (Pippa Scott). She is furious and she questions Carter about Gomer's training. She has Gomer assigned special detail in her office every evening for a week to teach him a lesson. Duke tells Gomer that they call Capt. Martin "Iron Pants". Later, Capt. Martin reprimands Corporal Peters (Yvonne Lime) for touching up her makeup. Col. Van Pelt thinks Martin was being a little too hard on Peters. At Martin's office, Gomer continues to do courtesies towards her and she just gets annoyed. The next day Gomer brings her a candy bar, which she is not happy about. He brings Martin flowers in a homemade vase. Gomer gets upset when Duke continues to make fun of Martin. One night Gomer asks Martin if she dances. He tells her that Col. Van Pelt danced with a woman at the Officer's Club who wasn't as pretty as she is. Gomer tells Martin that she was a lady before she was a Marine. Martin slowly starts to enjoy being treated as a woman. When his special detail is up, Gomer tells Martin he'll miss coming to see her.
5	5	"Gomer Learns a Bully"	Coby Ruskin	Harvey Bullock	October 23, 1964
Carter wants the men to do a faster time on the obstacle course. Private Harry Phillips (Frank Parker) is transferred to Carter's platoon. Carter's heard that Harry is a trouble maker and has been kicked out of two platoons. Carter will let the men straighten Harry out. Harry immediately picks on Gomer and gets him in trouble. Gomer tries to be understanding and find the good in Harry. Joey tells Gomer he needs to stand up to Harry. When Gomer asks him, Harry admits to playing Gomer for a sucker. Harry is on Gomer's bunk. Joey is about to start something with Harry, when Carter walks in. Because of Harry, Gomer gets in trouble again. Gomer asks Harry to step outside. But instead of fighting, Gomer just tells Harry he needs to act better. Carter knows that Harry is the one causing trouble and was also hoping that Gomer would stand up to him. Carter tries to subtly let Gomer know he has permission to do something about Harry. Gomer gets the idea when he overhears something else that Carter says. Gomer does manage to put Harry in his place, at least for the time being. Harry winds up being transferred again.
6	6	"Pay Day"	Coby Ruskin	Garry Marshall & Jerry Belson	October 30, 1964
Sgt. Carter bawls out Gomer for not working hard enough all week. He tells Gomer that he gets paid for working and when he doesn't do his job, that's stealing. When he does get paid, Gomer returns a weeks worth of the money. Gomer tells Carter what he did. Word of what happened makes it all the way to General Richards (Charles Lane) at the Pentagon. Richards thinks it is some kind of publicity stunt. Richards insists that Gomer take the money and he wants a signed receipt. Lieutenant Norris asks Carter why Gomer would return the money. Norris tells Carter that Gomer has to take the money back. No matter what Carter tries, he cannot get Gomer to take the money. Carter learns that the Pentagon is waiting for the receipt. Carter hears that Gomer was brought to General Wells (Ross Elliott). Carter is then called before General Wells. Gomer is there scrubbing the floor. Carter fears the worst, but the General commends him for instilling responsibility in Gomer. The reason Gomer was cleaning the floor was so he could earn the money back. John Lupton as Captain Edwards. Tom Hatten as Captain Daniels.
7	7	"Nobody Loves a Sergeant"	Sheldon Leonard	Jim Fritzell & Everett Greenbaum	November 6, 1964
It is one week before graduation from boot camp. Carter is riding the men hard because he says they're slow and dirty. Despite this, Gomer keeps telling Carter that he likes him. Carter tells Sergeant Whipple and Sergeant Moran (Ray Kellogg) that no matter what he does, Gomer likes him. Carter feels that he hasn't done his job correctly if he is not hated by all the recruits. Sergeant Whipple suggests humiliating Gomer in front of the other men. That plan doesn't work either. The camp psychiatrist, D. MacQuarrie (Liam Sullivan), tells Carter that Gomer can see through his rough exterior and find the good inside. He suggests that Carter put in for a transfer to California and take a break from being a drill instructor. Gomer and the rest of his platoon graduate boot camp and agree to reunite in ten years. Gomer tells Carter he would like to hook up with him sometime. Carter says they will be going to different camps, so that won't be possible. Carter arrives at Camp Henderson. Carter is stunned when Gomer and the boys are sent to Camp Henderson as well.
8	8	"Gomer and the Dragon Lady"	Coby Ruskin	Harvey Bullock	November 13, 1964
Gomer manages to foul up a scouting exercise and ruins a night off for the platoon. While in town on pass, Carter comes up with a plan to get revenge on Gomer for the foul up. He will set Gomer on a quest to get a kiss from Hannah (Barbara Stuart), "The Dragon Lady", owner of a local bar and grill. She's known for beating up any man that makes a pass at her. Carter sets up a fake raffle and the winner has to get a liberty kiss from Hannah. Carter claims that Gomer won. Gomer is uncomfortable kissing someone he doesn't know. Duke talks Gomer into letting him take Gomer's place. That night, Duke makes his move and Hannah throws him against the wall. Carter wants Duke to bring Gomer to the bar. Duke gives Gomer a sob story about how Carter is sad because Gomer broke the tradition of the liberty kiss by not showing up. Gomer explains how he feels to Hannah and that Carter put him up to it. Thinking he's a really nice guy, Hannah kisses him in front of everyone. She then proceeds to throw Carter against the wall. Alan Dexter as Sgt. Atwater. Pete Duel as 1st Man. David Frankham as Lt. Travers. Gene LeBell as Drunk in Bar. Notes: Stuart returns in Seasons 2-5 as Carter's girlfriend Bunny. This episode is the first set entirely in the fictional Camp Henderson in California.
9	9	"Survival of the Fattest"	Coby Ruskin	Bob Ross	November 20, 1964
The platoon is going on a Survival Training test. Two-man teams must rough it for five days in the wilderness. For the next week there will be a training program to prepare the men for the test. Gomer doesn't do so well. Sgt. Carter takes Gomer for his partner so he doesn't screw anything up. The test has started and Carter and Gomer are dropped off in the wilderness. Despite any foraging attempts by Carter, it is Gomer's small-town, backwoods upbringing that keeps finding food and water. Gomer is even able to make some cigars for Carter. It is the end of the five days. Gomer and Carter are the only ones in the platoon that finish the test gaining weight. Gomer explains all the things that he did. Carter hasn't talked to Gomer in several days. Gomer learns from Duke that because of his skills, Carter's pride was hurt. To make Carter feel better and though it is a lie, Gomer tells Captain Hathaway (Tom Hatten) that he couldn't have done anything he did without Carter's guidance.
10	10	"A Date for the Colonel's Daughter"	Coby Ruskin	Bob Ross	November 27, 1964
Colonel Emmet Harper's (Karl Swenson) daughter Jane is visiting from her all-girls school. The Colonel is having a hard time finding an escort for her to the enlisted men's dance. A Captain (Wayne Rogers) suggests that instead of an officer, Harper should try one of the enlisted men. As Gomer doesn't have a date, Carter is going to submit his name. Gomer winds up getting picked and Carter assures the Colonel that Gomer is a perfect gentleman. However, the Colonel's overprotective wife (Joan Tompkins) is not thrilled with the idea. Gomer learns he was picked and he's quite anxious about it. Gomer picks up Jane for the dance. Even though he's very polite, Mrs. Harper is still concerned. Gomer is a bit of a wild dancer with Jane. Mrs. Harper tells Gomer to calm down a bit. When Gomer and Jane go missing at the dance, Mrs. Harper panics. Harper asks Captain Murdock (Tom Hatten) to have the place searched. Turns out Gomer had taken Jane home. They are sitting on the porch and Gomer is singing to Jane. Jane is having a very nice time and kisses Gomer. Just then the Harper's drive up and Mrs. Harper wants Gomer punished. Jane explains that she kissed Gomer and everything was completely innocent. Jane lets her mother know that she is over reacting. David Frankham as 2nd Lieutenant.
11	11	"They Shall Not Pass"	Howard Morris	Richard M. Powell	December 4, 1964
Sgt. Carter's platoon takes part in war games and must destroy an enemy bridge. Major Stone (John Stephenson) will be their Umpire and will tag the men that get "killed". Gomer's naive ways are causing problems for Carter and the men. The platoon is very close to failing in their mission. To get Gomer out of the way, Carter has him carry "wounded" Eddie back. A chance encounter with two wounded enemy soldiers causes Gomer to go in the wrong direction. Gomer and Eddie wind up at the bridge that is to be destroyed. They spot an enemy soldier and Gomer goes to sneak up on him. It turns out to be Carter. Carter says that he lost his other men and the stuff to blow up the bridge. Carter will take Eddie back and get what he needs to destroy the bridge. Gomer is to stay and not let anyone cross the bridge unless they know the password. Carter is told that if his mission fails, his platoon will not get liberty for a week. A Lieutenant comes by the bridge and Gomer tries to stop him. The Lieutenant gets caught in a snare trap and is hanging upside down. Carter comes by and also gets caught in a trap. Gomer took out all the ropes from the bridge to make the traps. He drops a rock on the bridge and it collapses. Major Stone comes by to tag the bridge destroyed and says the Lieutenant was a spy. Major Stone gets caught in another trap. Carter and the platoon are awarded the Gold Boot for excellence by Captain Brinson (Forrest Compton). Tommy Leonetti as 1st Marine.
12	12	"Sergeant Carter, Marine Babysitter"	Howard Morris	James Allardice & Tom Adair	December 11, 1964
Sgt. Carter has big plans to spend the day with Bernice (Laurie Mitchell), a girl he just met. Frank Meade (Greg Mullavey) was counting on a day pass to help his wife Lois and their baby, but he gets stuck on guard duty. Gomer volunteers to help Frank's wife and run chores for her. Gomer is walking down the street with groceries he picked up for Lois. Carter sees him and offers to drive Gomer to the Meade house. They have a hard time finding the house. Carter calls Bernice to say he'll be late. He then gets roped into driving Lois, Gomer and the baby to the doctor. Carter calls Bernice again and leaves. Gomer and Lois leave the doctor's office and Carter is still outside trying to start his car. Gomer gets the car started and Carter reluctantly drives them home. The baby really seems to like Carter and he spends some time with it. The next time Carter calls Bernice, they have a fight and the date is off. Carter falls asleep holding the baby. When he wakes up, Gomer is gone. Lois thanks Carter for all his help. Gomer makes it up to Carter by explaining to Bernice what happened and bringing the two together. Molly Dodd as Nurse.
13	13	"The Case of the Marine Bandit"	Coby Ruskin	Art Baer & Ben Joelson	December 18, 1964
While driving into town, Carter and some other Marines pass Betty Ann Brewster (Kathie Browne), a stranded motorist. Carter tells the others to drop him off so he can help her. Gomer wanders by. Carter would like Gomer to leave as Carter wants to make time with Betty Ann. Gomer fixes the car. Because Betty Ann's car only seats two, she takes Gomer into town and leaves Carter. Betty Ann has Gomer meet her mother (Ellen Corby). Betty Ann and Mother involve an unknowing Gomer in a rather ingenious liquor store robbery scheme. Gomer visits Betty Ann again and they get him to unknowingly rob another liquor store. Artie (Don Penny) and Duke are reading a story in the paper about the "Marine Bandit". Gomer visits Betty Ann a third time, but this time Carter follows him. Gomer and Betty Ann drive to another liqour store and Carter follows them there. Carter sends Gomer back to the base and Carter then unknowingly robs the liquor store. Back at Betty Ann's house, Carter hears a radio report about the robbery. Carter figures out what happened and Betty Ann ties him up. But before she and Mother can leave, Gomer arrives with the police. Jackie Searl as Clerk #1. Dick Wilson as Clerk #3. Tommy Leonetti as Driver. Hallene Hill as Mother.
14	14	"Sergeant of the Week"	Coby Ruskin	Art Baer & Ben Joelson	December 25, 1964
Gomer is coming down with a cold. Meanwhile, Carter once again has not been named Sergeant of the week. Carter wants the men to do some running. Gomer asks if he could be excused because he doesn't feel well, but Carter doesn't care. Lieutenant Ames (John Lupton), the Doctor, gives Gomer a pill and tells him to gets some rest. Through a misunderstanding, Carter thinks Gomer is dying. Carter now feels guilty because he always rides Gomer so hard. So he tries to make the recruit's "last days" the best of his life. The men are wondering why Carter is being so nice to Gomer. Carter tells them that Gomer doesn't have long. Carter speaks with Lieutenant Ames again and finds out it was a horse that was very sick. Carter is ready to kill Gomer. But before he can do that, he is made Sergeant of the week by Captain Brinson, for his compassion. Carter thanks Gomer. Carter then comes down with a cold. Gomer now wants to take care of him. Forrest Lewis as Horse Trainer. Tommy Leonetti as Cpl. Cuccinelli.
15	15	"Grandpa Pyle's Good Luck Charm"	Coby Ruskin	James Allardice & Tom Adair	January 1, 1965
Gomer gets a letter from Grandpa Otis Pyle (Norris Goff), who says he's coming for a visit. Carter tells the platoon that each man will have a chance to lead the men in close order drill. This is to see if any of them is officer material. Gomer tells Carter that he doesn't think he has any leadership qualities. Carter tells him that every man has to get a turn. Grandpa Pyle arrives. Gomer tells him how he doesn't think he'll be able to lead the men. Grandpa wants to help Gomer, so he gets some children that Gomer can practice with. Grandpa winds up scaring the children away. Gomer's attempt at leading the men doesn't go well. Grandpa Pyle gives Gomer a special emblem to give him confidence and make him a great leader. Grandpa Pyle then tricks Carter into giving Gomer a second chance to lead. This time Gomer does very well. Gomer learns from Grandpa that the special emblem really had nothing to do with his improvement. It was just an emblem off of the fridge in Grandpa's trailer. Ron Rich as Oliver.
16	16	"Dance, Marine, Dance"	Coby Ruskin	Ben Joelson & Art Baer	January 8, 1965
Gomer gets a letter from Wally at the filling station in Mayberry. He also gets a coupon for a free dance lesson in Mayberry. Duke mentions there's a dance studio here in town. Fred and Ginger Fay (Gavin MacLeod and Sylvia Lewis) own the dance studio and it is not doing well. After giving him a free dance lesson, Fred and Ginger trick Gomer into a life time dance course. Carter tells Gomer he was swindled and he'll get Gomer out of the contract. Fred and Ginger then con Carter into a 5 year plan. Carter gets a bill from the studio for $250. Carter goes to the studio demanding to be let out of his contract. But Fred still demands to be paid. Unable to get out of his contract, Carter speaks with Raymond Thomas (Frank Maxwell), a lawyer. Raymond tells Carter the contract in legal and binding. After something Gomer says, Carter gets an idea. Carter gets all the men in the platoon to sign a dance contract. They all show up to the studio. While Fred is thrilled, Ginger cannot keep up with all the dancing. She says she quits and starts to tear up all the contracts. Carter later gets a bill from the lawyer.
17	17	"Sergeant Carter's Farewell to His Troops"	Coby Ruskin	Richard M. Powell	January 15, 1965
Gomer sees Carter sitting alone in a diner and joins him. Carter says that he is having a hard time getting a date and believes it is because of his uniform. He decides to not re-enlist in three days and will quit the Marines. Carter says he has an offer to be a motorcycle policeman. Gomer tells him that the men in the platoon would never stand for him leaving. Gomer takes Carter back to the barracks and has him wait outside. But when Gomer gives the men the news, they all cheer. The men later decide that whoever they get next could be worse. Duke comes up with a plan that if they all mess up enough, Carter will want to stay to straighten them out. The plan doesn't work. Duke then hopes sexy Corporal Sally Peters (Yvonne Lime) can keep Carter from quitting the Corps. She is seeing someone else but reluctantly agrees to help. At first Carter is not interested, but then he hears who the woman is. While Sally is with Carter in a club, her boyfriend Hank shows up and punches Carter. Carter finds out about the plan and is still going to quit. The next day, Cpl. Cuccinelli tells Carter his is officially out of the Corps. He also tells Carter that he has 24 hours to change his mind. In the end, Carter realizes he wants to stay a Marine. Larry Hovis as Larry.
18	18	"The Feudin' Pyles"	Coby Ruskin	Hy Kraft	January 22, 1965
The platoon have been practicing bayonet drills. Carter tells them that in one week, they will have an exercise in bayonet warfare with another platoon. He expects them to win the contest. Gomer says he'll work real hard. While playing horseshoes in the park, Gomer meets fellow Marine, Branch Eversole (James Hampton). Gomer learns Branch is a country boy from near Mayberry. Branch gives Gomer some tips on bayonet fighting. A policeman thinks they're really fighting and breaks them up. Gomer and Branch become quick friends and spend the day together. While at a diner, Gomer introduces Branch to Carter. Branch learns Gomer's last name is Pyle and realizes their families having been feuding for 75 years. Branch now tells Gomer they are blood enemies. Both men are very disappointed. Branch calls his father to ask him what to do and his father says he has to kill Gomer. The next day, the two try to figure out what to do. It is the time for the Bayonet exercise and Gomer's platoon is matched up with Branch's platoon. Gomer comes up with an idea. Gomer pairs up with Branch and allows Branch to "kill" him. They hope this will satisfy Branch's father and they can remain friends.
19	19	"Love Letters to the Sarge"	Coby Ruskin	Art Baer & Ben Joelson	January 29, 1965
All the men in the platoon are getting letters from girls except Sgt. Carter. Gomer feels bad for him and decides to send him anonymous love notes. Gomer asks a librarian about some books with love poems. He then goes to see a Salesgirl (Elisabeth Fraser) about some perfume. Carter gets several love letters and now wonders who his mystery lover could be. Gomer, playing along, gives him the names of several girls around the base that it could be. Carter goes to see Shirley (Jean Carson) at the PX lunch counter. He then goes to see Adelaide at the Club Ha Ha and Marilyn (Jackie Joseph), the girl at the USO. But none of them seem to be the one who wrote the letters. Thinking Carter is making the girl up, Sgt. Whipple tells him to bring the girl to the USO dance on Saturday. Gomer overhears this and writes Carter a goodbye love letter. Carter is sad when he reads the letter, but then he gets letters from the girls he had spoken to earlier. Charles P. Thompson as Old Man.
20	20	"Sergeant Carter Gets a "Dear John" Letter"	Coby Ruskin	Aaron Ruben	February 5, 1965
Carter waits an entire week for a date with Geraldine (Sherry Jackson), but then gets stuck with a special duty. Cuccinelli suggests that Carter get a "bodyguard" to make sure someone else doesn't get to her. Carter convinces Gomer to fill in for the date. Carter calls Geraldine at the last minute about Gomer, so she doesn't have time to find someone else. On the phone, Geraldine keeps calling Carter by a different name. Geraldine has a wonderful time with Gomer and she enjoyed all his compliments. Carter gets a "Dear John" letter from Geraldine. He thinks that somehow another man stole her away despite Gomer watching her. Carter wants Gomer to spend the day with Geraldine and keep an eye out for who the other guy might be. Geraldine tells Gomer she wants to be his steady. Gomer asks Carter what he'll do to the other guy when he finds out who he is. After Carter says what he'll do, Gomer is afraid to tell him what Geraldine said. Carter finds out the "other man" is Gomer. Gomer tells Carter it was completely one sided. He also says that Geraldine will fall for any sweet talker and Carter's better off without her. Later, Carter filling in for Gomer on a blind date backfires for Carter.
21	21	"Daughter of the Sarge"	Coby Ruskin	Harvey Bullock & R.S. Allen	February 12, 1965
Sgt. Carter's adopted Korean daughter, Sue Linn, writes that she'll be coming for a visit. Carter goes to the airport and looks for a little girl, but there is not one around. Back at the base, Sue Linn meets Gomer. She turns out to be a beautiful young woman. Carter comes back and realizes she's not the little girl he remembers. Sue Linn says she would like to continue her studies and marry a Marine. She is sad when Carter tells her she's to young to marry and should pick someone besides a Marine. Sue Linn tells Gomer she is already engaged to a Marine and is to be married on Sunday. It has been almost a week and Sue Linn cannot bring herself to tell Carter. Sunday is two days away and Sue Linn tells Gomer that Fred Pertwee will arrive today. She wonders if she should call off the wedding. Gomer suggests she talk to the Chaplain (Peter Hobbs). Sue Linn asks Gomer to talk to Carter. Gomer tries to talk to Carter about Sue Linn getting married, but Carter doesn't want to hear it. Cuccinelli tells Carter he saw Sue Linn with the Chaplain. Carter starts to believe it is Gomer that Sue Linn wants to marry. The Chaplain talks Carter into excepting Sue Linn's decision. Gomer explains to Carter that he's not the one whose marrying Sue Linn. Once Carter realizes Sue Linn is marrying Fred and he's a Captain, Carter is happy. Preston Hanson as Customs Man. Yuki Shimoda as Asian Man.
22	22	"Officer Candidate Gomer Pyle"	Coby Ruskin	Harvey Bullock & R.S. Allen	February 19, 1965
Because of Gomer, the men fail another inspection. Carter is fed up and wants to get away from all the knuckleheads. He decides to become an officer. There is an Officer Training exam coming up soon. Gomer learns that Carter is going to take the test and he will miss Carter if he leaves. Duke tells Gomer he should take the test as well, that way he can stay with Carter. Cuccinelli tells Carter that the top ten scores will be accepted for training. Carter came in 11th. Gomer comes by and tells Carter he came in 10th. Because he was accepted for training, Gomer doesn't have to do work detail. The one consolation is that Carter won't have to deal with Gomer anymore. But Gomer tells him he'll fix it so they will still be together. If Gomer becomes an officer, he'll request to be stationed with Carter. Or Gomer will ask that Carter be transferred to wherever he is sent. Cuccinelli tells Gomer that Carter feels bad because he lost out to a rookie. At the interview, Gomer tells them to take his name off the list. Carter learns he is now being accepted. The men give Carter a gift and he is very moved. Carter finds out from the Lieutenant Colonel (Forrest Compton) at the interview that he is there because of Gomer. Carter decides he wants to stay with his men. Tom Hatten as Captain Murdock.
23	23	"Old Man Carter"	Coby Ruskin	Ben Joelson & Art Baer	February 26, 1965
Gomer collects money from the guys so he can buy Sgt. Carter a gift for his 35th birthday. At first they do not want to give him any money, but Gomer talks them into it. The men tell Gomer he has to pick out the gift. Gomer goes to the gift shop and the Clerk (Alvy Moore) shows him things he can get for the $16 he has to spend. Gomer winds up buying Carter a watch. Carter is yelling at the men for all the things they forgot to do. At first Carter is touched by the gift, but then he starts to think about how old he is. Carter tries to prove he can handle getting old by competing against his men. He throws out his back while doing deep knee bends. Carter goes to the Doctor, who tells him it was just a muscle cramp. The Doctor mentions that Carter just cannot do everything as he did when he was younger. Gomer talks to the Doctor because he's worried about Carter. Gomer starts doing things to help Carter get his confidence back, but he just makes things worse. Duke tells the men that Carter asked to be transferred to a desk job. Gomer tries one more thing and it does prove to Carter that he can still do his job. Jerry Ziesmer as 1st Private.
24	24	"Gomer Makes the Honor Guard"	Coby Ruskin	Aaron Ruben	March 5, 1965
A Colonel (Forrest Compton) tells Carter that he has to pick four men from his platoon as Honor Guards for a visiting Princess. Meanwhile, Duke thinks Gomer is his good luck charm when Duke is gambling with Larry. Turns out that there are only three men in the platoon with Dress Blue uniforms. Gomer tells Carter that he ordered Dress Blues and he has the money to pay for them. He will pick them up Saturday morning. Carter does not want Gomer as one of the men. Carter tells Cuccinelli that the two of them need to come up with the money to buy someone else the Dress Blues. Duke wants Gomer to go gambling with him. Gomer reluctantly agrees to go. At first Duke is doing quite well. Gomer walks off and Duke loses everything. Duke borrows the money Gomer was going to use to pay for his Dress Blues and winds up losing it. Carter and Cuccinelli could only come up with $15 of the $45 they need. After Cuccinelli suggests it, Carter goes gambling and wins enough to buy a uniform for someone else. Carter is looking forward to telling Gomer he won't be in the Honor Guard. Gomer tells Carter that he cannot be in the Honor Guard because he lost his money. Gomer says he's sorry and he just wanted to make Carter proud of him. Carter buys the uniform for Gomer. When the Princess arrives, it is Carter that messes up. Frank J. Scannell as House-Gambler.
25	25	"My Buddy – War Hero"	Alan Rafkin	Ben Joelson & Art Baer	March 12, 1965
Sgt. Carter learns that his old war buddy, Sgt. Jim Mason (Don Rickles), will be stopping off at the camp while on his way to Honolulu. They have not seen each other in 13 years. Jim will be arriving that day and will only have 24 hours there. Carter tells Gomer how he had saved Jim's life in Korea. Carter hopes Jim won't spend the entire time there thanking him. Jim arrives and Carter has him meet Gomer. Carter goes off to set up accommodations for Jim. Jim proceeds to tell Gomer the same story that Carter had told except Jim says he saved Carter's life. Gomer gets Duke to help him keep Jim and Carter apart so they won't have a fallout over the conflicting memories. They get Carter and Jim to go out and get each other presents. Jim and Carter finally do get together. They exchange the presents and then start reminiscing. They get into an argument over who saved who in Korea. An altercation ensues and they knock each other to the ground. Gomer picks the two of them up. Because of what Gomer did, they come to realize that it was another soldier that saved the two of them.
26	26	"Double Date With the Sarge"	Alan Rafkin	Richard M. Powell	March 19, 1965
Carter tells Gomer that Diane could be "Miss Right". Not knowing who they are, Gomer runs into Diane and her friend Dixie in town. Gomer heads off to the USO. They both think Gomer is a nut, but Dixie also thinks he's cute. Carter comes by and he and Diane go on their date. Dixie goes to the USO and Gomer winds up spending the evening with her. Diane asks Carter if he'd like to double date with her friend. Carter cannot believe that its Gomer who is the other date. Gomer annoys Carter with his non-stop talking. Carter keeps trying to ditch Gomer and Dixie, but they keep finding him and Diane. Carter and Dixie don't get along. They all wind up in a classy restaurant. The men face a financial crisis when the dates order filet mignon and other expensive items. A man (Stanley Adams) comes by who says he used to be a Marine. Gomer tells him to sit down at their table and he starts talking to them. Carter begins to panic when the bill starts to add up. But, the man picks up the check. Dick Winslow as Waiter. Chanin Hale as Hostess.
27	27	"The Jet Set"	Alan Rafkin	Ben Joelson & Art Baer	March 26, 1965
Col. Edward Gray (Forrest Compton) tells Carter to send someone to the cigar store and buy a box of very fine cigars for a visiting Congressman (Byron Morrow). The Congressman will arrive the next day around noon. Meanwhile, Duke really wants to see his stewardess girlfriend Patty Gillette (Karen Sharpe). He tries to borrow money from Larry, but has no luck. Because no one else is around, Carter reluctantly tells Gomer to take the company jeep and get the cigars. Duke begs Gomer to take him to the airport to see Patty. While there, Gomer and Duke see Carter bringing a General to the airplane that they are at. They hide in the plane's bathroom. The plane takes off. Duke tells Gomer not to panic as it will only take them a couple hours to get back from San Francisco. They then learn that they're on a flight to Rome. It has been 10 hours and Carter wonders where Gomer is. Patty informs Gomer and Duke that the plane will then go to Paris and then London. She says she can get them back within 24 hours. At each stop, Gomer calls Carter with an excuse. After Gomer buys some cigars at the London airport, Patty finally gets them on a flight home. They make it back in time to give the Congressman the cigars. He is thrilled to get the British cigars. Carter tells Gomer that the next time the Congressman comes, he's going to expect the same brand. Arthur Gould-Porter as Cigar Clerk. Penny Santon as Italian Woman.
28	28	"Sergeant of the Guard"	Alan Rafkin	Richard M. Powell	April 2, 1965
Captain Brinson (Tom Hatten) tells Carter that he and some of his men will be pulling guard duty at a Marine warehouse that has been robbed. Brinson warns Carter that one of his men better not let the crooks get away with anything. Carter now worries about Gomer. While on guard, Gomer hears a noise and calls for Carter. It turns out to be a cat. Gomer has a couple more false alarms that irritate Carter. Carter gets into a little bit of trouble when Gomer stops USMC C.I.D. Agent Johnson (Ken Lynch). The crooks show up dressed as Marines and show Gomer a fake requisition order. Gomer helps load stuff into a truck. Carter shows up and he and Gomer get locked into the back of the truck when the crooks leave. Johnson sees the truck pull away and starts shooting at it. A box falls and hits Carter in the head and he gets knocked unconscious. Back at the hideout, the crooks discover Gomer in the truck, but do not know about Carter. Gomer gets Carter's gun and proceeds to trap the crooks in the truck. Gomer drives the truck back to the base. Captain Brinson is there and Gomer gives Carter all the credit for the capture. Arthur Batanides as Jo-Jo. Stanley Clements as J.D. Billy Halop as Hawkins.
29	29	"Gomer Dates a Movie Star"	Alan Rafkin	Budd Grossman	April 9, 1965
Duke doesn't think that movie star Gloria Morgan (Ruta Lee) will show up to the dance that evening. Gloria happens to be Gomer's favorite actress and he doesn't appreciate Duke talking that way. Carter wonders why Col. Gray wants to see Gomer. Gray would like Gomer to take his daughter Jane to the dance. Larry says that Gloria has arrived. Captain Murdoch (John Considine) shows Gloria the barracks where Carter's platoon stays. When she learns what a huge fan Gomer is, she autographs a picture for him. Duke and the boys play a prank on Gomer, and he thinks Gloria asked him to take her to the dance. Gomer has two dates and doesn't know what to do. Duke confesses to Gomer about the prank. While Gomer is a little upset with Duke, he's relieved he doesn't have the two dates. But it turns out Gloria actually wants Gomer to escort her to the dance. Gloria calls Gomer and not thinking, he agrees to take her to the dance. Just then he realizes he now has two dates again. Gomer hustles around trying to juggle the two dates. Both women know that something is not right. Gomer finally explains things to Jane and Gloria and they understand. They each give Gomer a kiss. Everyone winds up having a great time.
30	30	"Gomer the M.P."	Coby Ruskin	Harvey Bullock	April 16, 1965
In Carter's absence, Gomer takes a phone call from Lieutenant Petersen (John Lupton). No one is to go on liberty because of a special assignment. Petersen tells Carter that his platoon will be assigned M.P. duty. Special Council Mr. Horton (Robert Emhardt) arrives from Washington. Col. Gray says that Horton is here to look over the camp. Carter assigns his men which parts of town they will monitor. In town, two Army men, Walt and Pete (Paul Gilbert), pull a trick on Gomer and get him and Carter in trouble with Petersen. So he won't get in trouble again, Carter tells Gomer to just guard the back gate. And Gomer shouldn't let anyone in without an ID card. Horton tries to enter the camp through the back gate. Not knowing who Mr. Horton is, Gomer arrests him and puts him in the brig. Carter is upset when he finds out what Gomer did and figures that both of them are in trouble. Gomer is sent to Col. Gray's office. Much to Horton's surprise, Gray commends Gomer for following protocol. Gray also makes Horton understand that the camp maintains the strict security that Washington expects. Ron Rich as Marine.

=== Season 2 (1965–66) ===
- Beginning with the second season, all remaining episodes were presented in color.

No. overall	No. in season	Title	Directed by	Written by	Original release date
31	1	"P.F.C. Gomer Pyle"	Aaron Ruben	Ben Joelson & Art Baer	September 17, 1965
Carter has a chance to vacation in Hawaii. He learns that he has 6 men in his platoon who have not taken their PFC exams yet and one of them is Gomer. Carter wants the men to pass the test before he leaves for his vacation. Gomer tells Duke that he doesn't want people to think he's getting uppity by becoming a PFC. Gomer gets distracted and doesn't pass the test. Gomer tells Carter he's just not interested in becoming a PFC. Carter has the men help Gomer study late into the night. The men are not happy. Gomer falls asleep during the next test. Carter decides that he's still going to Hawaii. Not knowing it is a vacation, Gomer thinks that Carter is transferring because he failed the test. Gomer goes to apologize to Carter. Carter tells Gomer he's leaving to get away from him. Gomer wants Carter to stay, so he goes to talk to the Examiner (Rayford Barnes) about taking the test again. During the test, the Examiner sees Gomer looking at a piece of paper. He thinks Gomer was cheating, but the paper turns out to be a picture of Carter. This time Gomer passes. Thinking that Carter doesn't have to leave now, Gomer gets rid of his travel orders. Jack Larson as Tommy. Michael Bell as Garson. Jackie Joseph as Shirley.
32	2	"Third Finger, Left Loaf"	Coby Ruskin	R.S. Allen & Harvey Bullock	September 24, 1965
Gomer is to be best man at fellow Marine Jim Purcell's (Ted Bessell) wedding the next day. Carter is tired of hearing about the wedding. Sgt. Benson (Al Checco) has Gomer and Jim bury a land mine for a demonstration. Jim thinks he accidentally buried the ring with it. After wasting a lot of time digging, Gomer realizes he put on Jim's jacket by mistake and the ring is in the pocket. Jim continues to misplace the ring, so he asks Gomer to hold onto it. Gomer puts it on his little finger and then cannot get it off. Lieutenant Peterson (John Lupton) is inspecting the men. He gives Carter a hard time when he sees Gomer with the ring on. As punishment, Carter puts Jim and Gomer on mess hall duty where they are to bake bread. After they have finished late at night, the ring is not on Gomer's finger any more. He thinks it might be buried in one of 600 loaves of bread he had baked. Jim and Gomer have no luck searching the bread and are kicked out of the mess hall. When asked to help, Carter at first turns them down. But then with Col. Edward Gray's (Forrest Compton) permission, Carter uses a mine detector to search the bread. The ring is not in the bread, but they find it in Gomer's back pocket. During the wedding, there's another problem with the ring. Allan Melvin debuts as Mess Sgt. Charley Hacker.
33	3	"The Blind Date"	Coby Ruskin	Jack Elinson	October 1, 1965
Carter's date Bunny has a friend named Eileen Carson (Maggie Peterson) that she doesn't want to leave alone that night. Bunny tells Carter that it is a double date or nothing. Being that it is Saturday night and it is the last minute, Carter cannot find another guy. The only one available is Gomer. Carter reluctantly asks Gomer, but he says he was going to the movies. Carter orders him to go on the date. Carter tells Bunny that Gomer comes from a rich Southern family. Bunny then tells Carter that Eileen is a society girl. Gomer is concerned about going out with a society girl. Eileen is concerned because she is not society. Carter keeps trying to be alone with Bunny. Bunny worries that Eileen is not having a good time. Thinking Gomer is used to the best, Bunny suggests going to an expensive restaurant. Because they do not have a reservation, Bunny tells Carter to tip the Maitre d' (Roger Til). Through the whole night Carter tries to get some alone time with Bunny. Gomer and Eileen are uncomfortable the whole evening. Until they both find out that neither is from a wealthy family. Gomer and Eileen then have a nice time. Carter and Bunny get into an argument when they both realize they lied about Gomer and Eileen. Carter never really gets to be alone with Bunny. Barbara Stuart debuts as Carter's girlfriend Bunny.
34	4	"Home on the Range"	Coby Ruskin	Art Baer & Ben Joelson	October 8, 1965
Gomer meets the Caldwell family from N. Carolina who have encountered truck problems en route to Oregon. He says he will try and fix their truck. Gomer has Harper Caldwell (Dabbs Greer) and family stay in a field supplies hut. But after Gomer leaves, they are kicked out. Meanwhile, Carter tells the platoon about upcoming war maneuvers. He says that there better not be any mistakes as the press will be there. Gomer then has the family stay in an abandoned military vehicle, but they get kicked out of there as well. Gomer finds the family another place, not knowing it is a war games target shack. After maneuvers start, Gomer realizes that they are to destroy the shack. Gomer tries to stall for time by firing on other things. Gomer winds up destroying the Caldwell's truck. Not knowing whose firing on them, Harper starts shooting back. Col. Gray asks Carter whose in the shack. Gray wants to use tear gas, but Gomer volunteers to go to the shack. Gomer gets to the shack and explains to the Caldwells about the war maneuvers. Gomer then tells Gray about the family. Col. Gray agrees to give them a truck and the press says it will make a good human interest story. Claudia Bryar as Lottie Caldwell.
35	5	"Gomer Untrains a Dog"	Coby Ruskin	Jack Elinson	October 15, 1965
Carter needs a volunteer to train a dog for sentry duty. It comes down to between Gomer and Buck Johnson (Paul Trinka). Johnson describes his very tough method of training. Gomer says he has a more gentle way. Carter surprisingly picks Gomer. Sgt. Myers (Sandy Kenyon) brings the dogs and Gomer picks Killer for his dog. Gomer is too mild with the dog and Killer doesn't obey Gomer's commands. Carter is beginning to wonder if he made a mistake picking Gomer. The next day things go a little better. Gomer decides when they are not training, he'll call the dog Lemley Gilbert. Killer does eventually listen to Gomer. But when he's not in training, Gomer pampers Killer. Lieutenant Fredericks (Fred Holliday) comes by to inspect the dogs. Fredericks is upset when he finds that instead of being a ferocious guard dog, Killer has been turned into a pussycat. Fredericks wants to send Killer to the dog pound. When Carter yells at Gomer, Killer goes after Carter. Col. Gray says that Killer came to his master's defense. They find another use for Killer.
36	6	"Supply Sergeants Never Die"	Coby Ruskin	Harvey Bullock & R.S. Allen	October 22, 1965
While playing cards, Sgt. Henry Singer (Jeff Corey), the Supply Sergeant, says his job is more important than Carter's. Singer says that he cannot even take a vacation because no one else could do his job. Singer then learns from Gomer that he just became a grandfather and he would love to go and see the kid. Carter bets him a months salary that any Knucklehead can take over his job. Singer suggests Gomer fill in for him and Carter reluctantly agrees. At the supply room, Gomer has no idea where anything is. Carter finds out that Private Lester Hummel (William Christopher) knows his way around the supply room. Carter orders Gomer to take some leave. His plan to switch Hummel for Gomer doesn't work out. Six days in and Gomer has the supply room a complete mess. Singer calls Carter to check on things and Carter pretends things are going well. Gomer learns from Corporal Boyle about Carter's bet with Singer. Gomer straightens the whole place up and comes up with a new way to organize things. Carter really gives Singer a hard time. A depressed Singer says he'll retire, which Carter doesn't want. Gomer's system winds up not working and Singer feels needed again. Singer refuses to take Carter's salary check and says they will forget about the bet.
37	7	"Cat Overboard"	Christian Nyby	Jack Elinson	October 29, 1965
Gomer has been taking care of Henrietta, a feral cat on the base. Carter informs the platoon that they will be doing maneuvers for 3 weeks on a Navy ship. Gomer releases Henrietta, but she just comes back to him. When they get on the ship, the men's quarters are quite cramped. Duke finds out that Gomer snuck the stray cat aboard the ship. Carter tells his men he wants no mistakes and no rules broken on this trip. Carter finds out about Henrietta. While addressing the Marines, Chief Petty Officer Simpson (Tige Andrews) finds a small turtle. It turns out to be Marine Frankie's (Ted Bessell) that he bought as a souvenir. Simpson throws it overboard. Simpson says he has strict rules about contraband. Gomer tells Carter that the cat is pregnant. Henrietta gets loose, but Carter manages to hide it before Simpson sees it. Carter wants to turn the cat in, but it is gone missing again. When Gomer thinks that Simpson has thrown Henrietta overboard, Gomer jumps in after her. It wasn't the cat, but just some of Simpson's old magazines. Simpson is embarrassed when the men find out they were romance magazines. Simpson finds out about Henrietta and he's angry at Gomer for sneaking her aboard his ship. He shows some compassion and takes her down to the sick bay to give his pharmacists training in delivering her kittens. Brendon Boone as Sailor.
38	8	"Gomer Captures a Submarine"	Christian Nyby	Jack Elinson	November 5, 1965
Still on the Navy ship, everyone in Carter's platoon is feeling seasick except Gomer. Chief Petty Officer Simpson teases Carter about how his men are feeling. Col. Gray tells Carter that he and 3 of his men are to make a reconnaissance mission to a small island. They also have to look out for an enemy submarine. Gray tells Simpson to provide Carter with a boat. Instead of a boat, Simpson gives Carter a rubber raft. They try three times to get away from the ship on a raft and thanks to Gomer, they do not make it. Simpson is teasing Carter each time. Fog has started to roll in. On the fourth attempt, and without Gomer, they make it away from the ship. They are to remain in a holding position until they get a signal. Simpson, hoping to mess things up for Carter, has Gomer swim out to the raft with a message. When Carter realizes what Simpson planned, he sends Gomer swimming back to the ship. Gomer winds up swimming to the submarine periscope. Carter and his men are congratulated for capturing the sub. Brendon Boone as Sailor.
39	9	"The Grudge Fight"	Peter Baldwin	Bill Idelson & Sam Bobrick	November 12, 1965
Carter's platoon is still on the Navy ship. Carter wants his men to get into better shape. Chief Petty Officer Simpson still teases Carter every chance he gets. Carter has his men box each other and they are not doing well. Carter tries to show his men what to do. Carter unknowingly challenges Simpson to a match in front of the whole ship. Carter brags to his men what a good fighter he is. The men want to bet on Carter with some of the sailors. Duke learns that Simpson was the Fleet Champ with 37 knockouts. Duke, Gomer and Frankie go to tell Carter what they found out. Carter tries to down play what they said. Meanwhile, to try and save Carter from making a huge mistake, Gomer and his friends try psychological warfare. They try to convince the sailors that Carter is an ex-boxing champ from the Marines' boxing team. The sailors tell Simpson what they heard about Carter and he starts to believe them. Carter finds out what his men did. He decides to still fight Simpson because his men cared enough to do what they did. It is the night of the fight. One punch and Carter is knocked out. Carter would like to find a way to pay the men back for the money they lost on the fight. He learns they won money as they bet on Simpson. William Christopher as Marine. Ray Kellogg as Referee.
40	10	"Gomer the Star Witness"	Peter Baldwin	Ben Joelson & Art Baer	November 19, 1965
Gomer asks Carter for a pass so he can go to a flower show in town. Gomer then suggests that maybe later he and Carter could do something together. Carter tells Gomer he would never plan an evening with him. While sitting in a restaurant, Gomer witnesses an automobile accident between Carter and Fred Cummins (Michael Forest). Carter leaves before Gomer can get to him. Gomer speaks to Fred and agrees to be a witness in court. Carter gets a call and learns that Cummins is suing him. Corporal Boyle tells Carter that if there were no witnesses, it is Cummins word against his. Boyle says that they will believe a Marine before a civilian. Carter learns that Gomer saw the accident. Boyle suggests to Carter that if Gomer had a long furlough, he wouldn't be around for the court date. Just then a Process Server comes by and gives both Carter and Gomer a summons to appear in court. Carter now tries to get on Gomer's good side. It is the day of the trial. Carter's plan to have Gomer not show up to court doesn't work. After Gomer testifies, the Judge (Willis Bouchey) finds both Carter and Fred at fault and dismisses the case. Roy Stuart debuts as Corporal Boyle. William Newell as Bailiff. Stacy Harris as Finley.
41	11	"A Visit From Cousin Goober"	Peter Baldwin	Bill Idelson & Sam Bobrick	November 26, 1965
Carter yells at Gomer for making so many goofs and tells him to stop. Gomer tells Duke and Frankie that he's been messing up because he has a personal problem. Gomer tells them that he got a letter from his cousin Goober (George Lindsey) that says he had a falling out with Wally at the gas station in Mayberry. Just then, Goober makes a surprise visit to Gomer. Gomer has to go on a hike and he tells Goober that civilians cannot be on the base. Goober says he might become a Marine. Gomer tells him to get a room at the hotel in town and Gomer then leaves for the hike. But instead of going to town, Goober puts on one of Gomer's uniforms. He tells a Lieutenant (John S. Ragin) that his name is Pyle and is then yelled at for having civilian shoes on. The Lieutenant says Goober is confined to the barracks and he'll write a report about the shoes. The men come back from the hike. Carter gets the report and goes to yell at Gomer. The Lieutenant sees Goober sitting outside the barracks. He thinks Goober is crazy and takes him to Captain Reiner (Charles Aidman), a psychiatrist. Duke tells Gomer that he should tell Carter about Goober, but Gomer doesn't want Goober to get in trouble. Reiner tells Carter that he thinks "Pyle" has a double personality. Carter tells Gomer that they will be sending him home. Gomer tells Carter about Goober and Carter believes that it is part of his double personality. After some more confusion, Carter and Reiner find out there really is a Goober.
42	12	"A Groom for Sergeant Carter's Sister"	Coby Ruskin	Bill Idelson & Sam Bobrick	December 3, 1965
Carter tells Boyle how excited he is that his sister Babe (Marlyn Mason) is coming for a visit. Carter and Gomer meet Babe at the bus stop. At the hotel, Babe tells Carter that she is going to marry Harold Kanobly (Bill Idelson). Carter knows Harold and is against it. Babe says they're in love, but Carter says she should think it over. Babe calls Harold and says she has a plan to get Carter to like him. Babe asks Gomer to show her around town that evening. She also asks him not to say a word to Carter. At the end of the evening, Babe asks Gomer to take her out the next evening. She runs into Carter at the hotel and tells him what a wonderful date she had and the guy's a Marine. Carter tells Boyle that Babe met a Marine and that he could be the one. Boyle says that it could just be a passing infatuation. Boyle suggests that Carter stake out the hotel to see who the guy is. Carter finds out that Babe is seeing Gomer. Babe tells Carter that after a second date, she is sure he's the man for her. Carter tells her he knows it is Gomer. Babe calls Harold and says she's sure Carter will approve of him soon. Carter asks Col. Gray if they could transfer Gomer somewhere else, but Gray says no. Now Carter wants to get Babe back with Harold and he has Harold come to town.
43	13	"Gomer Minds His Sergeant's Car"	Coby Ruskin	Art Baer & Ben Joelson	December 10, 1965
Carter is being sent to San Francisco to bring back an AWOL Marine named Franklin. As a last resort, Carter has Pyle drive his precious car back from the airport. After he drops Carter off, Gomer walks back to the parking lot only to find the car stolen. Pyle has 24 hours to find it before Carter gets back. Gomer files a report with Patrolman Dugan (Ken Lynch). Gomer mentions that the keys were left in the car. Duke shows up at the police station. Dugan gets a call and they think they found the car in the ocean. When they pull it out, it is not Carter's car. Dugan, Gomer and Duke follow another lead, but it is also not the car. Gomer has a dream that the car is in his barracks, but then it is gone. Gomer goes and spends to rest of the night sleeping in the police station. The next morning, they find the car in perfect condition. But then a wrecking ball falls on it. Gomer and Dugan speak to Mr. Gibbons (Tol Avery) of the construction company. Gibbons gets Gomer a new, but different, car. Surprisingly, Carter is not upset about the car. But while Carter is lecturing Gomer about leaving the keys in the car, Franklin gets out of his handcuff and escapes.
44	14	"Gomer, the Peacemaker"	Coby Ruskin	Ben Joelson & Art Baer	December 17, 1965
Carter and Bunny have a lovers spat and split up. Gomer and Frankie are at a bar and Carter comes in. They join Carter and find out about Bunny. Frankie tells Gomer to stay out of it. But the two go to speak with Bunny. Gomer tells her how sad Carter is and asks Bunny to come see him at the bar. At the bar, Carter runs into an old girlfriend, Toby Comstock (Kathleen Hughes). Toby is there with her husband Bill. Bill goes to meets some friends and Toby sits with Carter for a few minutes to catch up. Bunny sees Carter with Toby and leaves. After Toby leaves, Gomer and Frankie join Carter again. Gomer tells Carter that Bunny is home alone. Bunny's friend Phyllis brings a party to Bunny's place. When Carter goes to Bunny's, he sees the party and leaves. The next day, Frankie once again tells Gomer to stay out of it. After seeing how depressed Carter is, Gomer and Frankie go to see Chaplain Franklin (David Lewis). Carter tells Boyle that he's going to a hotel to get some rest. Gomer learns from Boyle where Carter went. Gomer, thinking Carter may try to harm himself, goes to the hotel with Bunny and Frankie. Because Carter has ear plugs in, he doesn't hear Gomer knocking on the door. Panicked, Gomer takes a fire axe and breaks the door down. Carter and Bunny make up. Robert Patten as Man. Janice Carroll as Operator.
45	15	"Gomer Pyle, P.O.W."	Coby Ruskin	Carl Kleinschmitt & Dale McRaven	December 24, 1965
Gomer and his platoon will be engaging in "war games" against a rival unit. Carter is told by Lieutenant Hastings that their side is going to attack a railroad crossing deep in enemy territory. Gomer quickly makes a mistake and gets Carter in trouble. The plan now is to let one of Carter's men get captured and feed the enemy false information that they're going for the ammo dump. Carter sends Gomer. Gomer comes back uncaptured. Carter sends Gomer out again and has Duke follow him to make sure he's captured. Duke sees Gomer captured, but later Gomer comes back. Gomer explains how he got away. Gomer finally does get captured. The enemy Captain (Paul Smith) bribes Gomer with food to get information. Gomer, knowing he's being bribed, doesn't tell him what Carter told him to say. Instead, Gomer tells him that his men were going to attack a railroad crossing. Duke gets captured and tells Gomer that they really were going to attack the crossing. Gomer gets sick from all the food he ate. He is sent to see the Doctor (Robert Brubaker). After the Doctor leaves, Gomer dresses up as a Navy officer and escapes. Gomer winds up capturing 2 enemy platoons. Later, he is to be given a special citation by Col. Gray but Carter says that Gomer was captured again. Gomer escapes by wearing a dress. Jamie Farr as Sergeant Mansky.
46	16	"Gomer Pyle, Civilian"	Peter Baldwin	Rick Mittleman	December 31, 1965
Carter is having beers with some other officers and he's complaining about Gomer. Gomer comes by and annoys Carter with a stupid request. Gomer keeps doing things that are getting on Carter's nerves. Corporal Boyle suggests that Carter take a furlough. Carter's too busy to leave, but he can force Gomer to go. Gomer doesn't want to take a week long furlough because he'll miss everyone. Gomer takes a civilian bartender job on base so he can remain close to his friends. Carter and Boyle go to have a beer. They are stunned when they see Gomer is the bartender. Gomer winds up spilling a beer on Carter. Carter is furious, and because of something he says, Gomer realizes Carter didn't want him around. Not wanting to make Carter unhappy anymore, Gomer puts in for a transfer. Boyle shows Carter the transfer request and Carter is thrilled. Gomer's almost done with his week furlough and Boyle tells Carter he's just as irritable as before. Carter starts to realize that he'll actually miss Gomer. He talks to Col. Gray about cancelling the transfer. Carter comes to Gomer with the transfer papers and tears them up in front of him. Buck Young as Sergeant Whipple. Alan Dexter as Sergeant Moran.
47	17	"Gomer and the Beast"	Lee Philips	Bill Idelson & Sam Bobrick	January 7, 1966
Gomer, Duke and Frankie are at a restaurant. They notice that waitress Ginger's (Nancy Hadley) boyfriend, Sergeant Arthur Henchley (Michael Conrad), is very mean to her. Frankie says it is no wonder they call Henchley "The Beast". Gomer walks Ginger home and he does cheer her up. Ginger tells Gomer he's a very nice guy and she appreciates what he's trying to do. Back at the base, Duke warns Gomer that he better be careful because Arthur is a tough guy. At the restaurant, Ginger is extra nice to Gomer. Ginger tells off Arthur and then asks Gomer out. Arthur warns Carter that he better get Gomer to stop seeing Ginger. Carter finds it amusing that a guy like Gomer can move in on Henchley. Boyle tells Carter he better warn Gomer. Carter does talk to Gomer, but then he decides that Henchley cannot tell him what to do. Carter takes Gomer to see Henchley. Carter tells Arthur that Gomer will see who he wants, but then he tells Gomer not to see Ginger. Gomer goes to see Ginger and she tells him she's sorry she asked him out. She was just overreacting after her fight with Arthur. She then gives Gomer a kiss. Arthur sees this and he takes Gomer out to the alley to fight. Ginger calls the police and an ambulance. Gomer talks to Arthur and gets him to be nicer to Ginger and change his gruff personality. Arthur apologizes to Ginger. There's a misunderstanding when Carter sees the ambulance.
48	18	"Grandma Pyle, Fortuneteller"	Peter Baldwin	Bill Idelson & Sam Bobrick	January 14, 1966
Duke tells Gomer and Frankie that if he had any money, he'd be at the big crap game in town. Grandma Pyle (Enid Markey) makes a surprise visit to Gomer. Grandma thinks Gomer is looking thin, so she takes him out for a large meal. Gomer tells her that he remembers when she used to tell his future with cards. Grandma still has her cards and proceeds to tell Gomer's future. She says that something bad is going to happen to someone close to him and it will be Gomer's fault. Carter yells at Gomer and loses his voice. Carter goes to see the Doctor (Robert Brubaker), who asks if Carter's been yelling a lot. The Doctor tells him to not talk for one day. Grandma gives Gomer some home-made medicine to help Carter. Gomer puts some in Carter's coffee. Carter now speaks in a high pitched voice. The Doctor tells Carter his voice should be back to normal in a couple days. Gomer tells Carter and Boyle about his Grandma's medicine. Grandma then reads Gomers tea leaves and says Carter is in terrible danger. Boyle suggests that Carter go into town to relax at the crap game. Gomer does various things to prevent him from going. It is a good thing Gomer did, because the crap game gets raided and everyone is arrested. Carter gets his voice back and thanks Grandma Pyle.
49	19	"Arrivederci, Gomer"	Peter Baldwin	Harvey Bullock & R.S. Allen	January 21, 1966
Frankie invites Gomer to his home for the weekend. Frankie tells Gomer he will meet Mama Lombardi (Lillian Adams), Papa and his sister Rosa (Gigi Perreau). Meanwhile, Mama wonders why Rosa's boyfriend Leo hasn't asked her to get married yet. Frankie and Gomer arrive and the family is very happy to see Frankie. It is not long before Mama starts an argument about Leo. Frankie has Papa take Gomer to his room. Mama then tells Frankie that Leo has been seeing Rosa for two years and she still has no ring. Mama asks Frankie to speak to Leo. At dinner, Gomer doesn't help matters by constantly saying the wrong thing when Mama hints at marriage. Frankie takes Gomer aside and tells him they're trying to get Leo interested in marriage. After Leo leaves, Gomer sings an Italian love song. This leads Mama to think Gomer is proposing to Rosa. The next day Uncle Julio arrives. He reads Gomer's palm and says he's going to have a lot of children with Rosa. Gomer tells Frankie he didn't get a chance to say he wasn't interested in Rosa. Rosa tells Gomer she's sorry that Mama overreacted. Frankie has a plan to make Leo really think that Rosa and Gomer are getting together. Gomer and Frankie go to Leo's butcher shop and the plan doesn't work. They go back to Frankie's house and Frankie doesn't have his keys. Leo sees Gomer putting a ladder up to an open window. Leo thinks Gomer and Rosa were going to elope. Leo says Rosa and him are getting married. Mama tries to set Gomer up with Rosa's cousin Gina. Note: Frank Sutton doesn't appear in this episode.
50	20	"Sergeant Carter Dates a Pyle"	Coby Ruskin	Rick Mittleman	January 28, 1966
Carter tells the men that the base is having an open house and the men are to invite someone. There will be a dance Saturday night. Gomer wants to invite his girl cousin, Bridey Pyle (Bobo Lewis). Gomer believes that Carter has no one to invite. He would like to set Carter up with Bridey, but Carter wants nothing to do with it. Francine, the girl that Duke invited, arrived early. Duke has guard duty and wants Gomer to entertain Francine, because Gomer is the only one he can trust. Carter and Boyle see Gomer with attractive Francine and think she is Bridey. Carter tells Gomer he'll meet his cousin. At the dance, Carter finds out that Francine is Duke's date. Carter decides to leave, but Boyle talks him into staying. There is another case of mistaken identity and Carter thinks Bridey is homely. Gomer is actually talking to another Marine's sister. Carter sneaks out a window. Gomer tells Boyle that Bridey's bus is going to be late. Boyle finds Carter and tells him that woman wasn't Bridey. Then Gomer is with another attractive woman named Flora (Arlene Howell), who Carter now thinks is Bridey. Flora turns out to be a friend of Bridey's, who came along with her. Carter finally meets Bridey, who is not very good looking. He makes up an excuse to leave, which winds up backfiring on him.
51	21	"Little Girl Blue"	Coby Ruskin	Dale McRaven & Carl Kleinschmitt	February 4, 1966
Gomer, Duke and Frankie volunteer to help at a dinner being given for visiting Colonel Matthews (Nelson Olmsted). They are to be busboys at the dinner and Carter is not happy Gomer is one of them. Matthews arrives with his wife and young daughter, Margaret. Carter tells Boyle he cannot believe Gomer was picked. Col. Gray is talking to Gomer, Duke and Frankie and Carter comes by. Gray tells Carter that because they are his men, he's sure everything will be alright. Carter tells Gomer he's going to be watching him. Gomer befriends little Margaret. But every time Gomer and Margaret get together, they seem to get into trouble. It is time for the dinner and Carter gives Gomer an easy task to do. Gomer causes some problems at the dinner and Carter kicks him out. From her bedroom window, Margaret sees Gomer leaving. She invites him up to her room. They put on a record and start dancing. Carter wants Gomer punished. Matthews sees how much Margaret likes Gomer and he lets them play together some more. Matthews also tells Carter that Gomer is a good man. Patricia Wright as Mrs. Gray. Amzie Strickland as Miss Sims, The Governess.
52	22	"A Star Is Born"	Coby Ruskin	Art Baer & Ben Joelson	February 11, 1966
Dan Curtis (Jerome Cowan) and Lew Meadows (George O. Petrie) speak to Col. Gray about doing a documentary about the Marines. They would like to feature Carter. Dan and Lew tell Carter they just want him to do what he has been doing. None of the platoon will know what's going on as hidden cameras and microphones will be used. The next day, Carter goes to the Barber (Herb Vigran) before filming starts and he's wearing his dress blues. Lew and Dan want him to change clothes. Carter starts to ham it up when the cameras start rolling. Dan tries to subtly tell Carter that he's ruining the film by not acting natural. Carter, though, believes it is Gomer that Dan is talking about. Carter gives Gomer several senseless chores to do to keep him away. Lew follows Gomer around and films him. That film turned out great. Carter learns that they are going to feature Gomer and he's not happy about it. He yells at Gomer and then finds out he was being filmed. Dan and Lew decide to make the film "A Day In The Life Of A Marine Private and His Sergeant". Gomer and Carter are at a bar and want to watch the film on TV. Everytime a scene with Carter comes on, the TV goes haywire. Paul Bryar as Bartender.
53	23	"Gomer and the Phone Company"	Coby Ruskin	Bill Idelson & Sam Bobrick	February 25, 1966
Duke, Frankie and Gomer are trying to figure out what they can do with the limited money they have. After Gomer is finished making a call, the pay phone spits out $41.75 in coins. Duke and Frankie want to spend it, but honest Gomer wants to return it to the phone company. At the phone company, no one seems to understand that Gomer wants to return the money. Gomer is finally sent to a Mr. Corbett (Parley Baer). Mr. Corbett thinks Gomer is probably some prankster and decides to have some fun with him. Back at the base, Duke and Frankie tell Gomer he did what he could and he should now keep the money. Gomer has the money in his pocket and Carter hears the jingling. He tells Gomer to just put the coins back in the phone. While trying to put the money back, Gomer gets arrested. At the police station, Gomer is questioned by Bernard (Chick Chandler) and Harry. They do not believe Gomer is really a Marine and he's probably robbed other phone booths. Carter convinces the men that Gomer is a Marine, but they still think he's a crook. Carter tries to help Gomer, but he only makes matters worse and Gomer winds up behind bars. Carter finally gets Mr. Corbett to explain to the police that Gomer did try to return the money. Corbett leaves the police station without thanking Gomer. The next day, as a thank you, Mr. Corbett lets everyone in the platoon make a free long distance call. Gomer is the last one to make a call and after he's finished, coins fall out of the phone. Molly Dodd as Secretary. Olan Soule as Adjuster. Maudie Prickett as Woman.
54	24	"Duke Slater, Night Club Comic"	Coby Ruskin	Bill Idelson & Sam Bobrick	March 4, 1966
Duke is showing off his impressions to the boys of the platoon. Duke, Frankie and Gomer go to the Jade club on amateur talent night. They are not impressed with the acts. Gomer gets a reluctant Duke to do his impressions act. Duke impersonates Gomer, but his impersonation of Sgt. Carter wins him the contest. He is also invited to come back and perform again. Meanwhile, Col. Gray informs Carter he's been chosen top rated sergeant on the base. Boyle tells Gomer about Carter's award. Not mentioning the impersonations, Gomer tells Carter that he should go and see Duke perform. Carter tells Bunny that they're celebrating this evening and going to the club. At the club, Gomer tells Frankie that he invited Carter. Frankie thinks that Carter will get very upset when he sees Duke's impression of him. The Night Club M.C. (Milton Frome) introduces Duke. Just then Carter and Bunny arrive. Carter wants to leave when he sees the impression of him. Gomer finds a way to save the evening. He gets on stage and introduces Carter. When Carter starts singing, the audience all leave. Buck Young as 1st Sergeant. Alan Dexter as 2nd Sergeant. Eddie Paskey as Audience member.
55	25	"Vacation in Vegas"	Coby Ruskin	Rick Mittleman	March 11, 1966
Boyle gets a phone call and learns that Gomer won a free weekend in Las Vegas. While Boyle goes to find Gomer, Carter gets on the phone. He learns the trip is for two. Carter really wants to go with. He makes sure that Gomer's first choice, Duke, has guard duty. Gomer agrees to take Carter with him. Carter plans to gamble all weekend with Gomer's prize money. But Gomer has set an itinerary which includes lots of sight seeing. Carter introduces his friend Irene (Joyce Jameson) to Gomer. Gomer takes Carter and Irene to a rock museum and then Hoover Dam. Irene complains about all the standing they've done. Gomer then takes them to see a Native Indian Dancer, where they can sit down. When they get back to the hotel, an angry Irene leaves. Gomer takes a nap and Carter takes the last of Gomer's prize money to gamble with. Gomer wakes up and finds his money missing. Carter is winning big and he calls Irene and tells her to get dressed up. Carter tells Gomer he won the money for him. Instead of having a lavish night as Carter and Irene hoped, Gomer gives the money to a Red Cross Lady (Ottola Nesmith). Tris Coffin as Manager. Robert Arthur as Guide. Frank J. Scannell as Pit Boss.
56	26	"Opie Joins the Marines"	Coby Ruskin	Aaron Ruben	March 18, 1966
Col. Gray tells the platoon leaders that reporters will be on base and he doesn't want anything out of order. Carter tells Gomer not to mess up. Opie Taylor suddenly arrives. Opie tells Gomer that he ran away from Mayberry to join the Marines. He was able to hitch a ride on a plane. Gomer, Frankie and Duke make several attempts to get Opie off the base. Carter finally learns about Opie. Carter wants Opie off the base by that night. They have to hide Opie again when Gray and the reporters enter the barracks. Gomer brings Opie to a hotel. But Gomer decides he cannot leave him there alone and brings him back to the base. Carter takes Opie back to the hotel. But after Opie apologizes for the trouble he's causing, Carter has a change of heart and brings Opie back. The next morning Gomer panics when Opie is not at the hotel and he tells Carter. Col. Gray and the reporters meet Opie. Carter explains what happened and he just felt Opie would be safer with him. Opie tells Gray that it is all his fault. He tells them how he wanted to be in the best platoon with the best sergeant. One Reporter (Tommy Farrell) wants to write a human interest story about Opie. Andy comes to get Opie and Carter explains what a good boy he is. Guest Stars: Ron Howard as Opie Taylor and Andy Griffith as Andy Taylor
57	27	"A Date With Miss Camp Henderson"	Coby Ruskin	Carl Kleinschmitt & Dale McRaven	March 25, 1966
Sgt. Carter says that anyone could get a date with Miss Camp Henderson, Julie Myers (Susan Oliver). Sgt. Hacker makes a $50 bet with Carter that Gomer couldn't get a date with her within a week. Hacker then offers to let Carter out of the bet or even pick a different guy. Carter will stay with Gomer. Carter arranges a meeting between Gomer and Julie under the guise that Gomer is a reporter. Gomer tells her something honest and nice that Julie really appreciates. Julie agrees to see Gomer on Saturday night. As part of the bet, Carter talks Gomer into taking Julie to look-out point. Julie thinks that Gomer is there for the same reason most others come there for. But he just enjoys the quiet up there and Julie gives him a kiss on the cheek. Carter and Hacker are not far away with binoculars. Carter wins the bet. Hacker shows up at Julie's apartment thinking she'll be easy to get a date with. Hacker tells her about the bet. Thinking he was in on the bet, an angry and hurt Julie tells off Gomer. A disappointed Gomer tells Carter that "She trusted me, but the worst part is how I trusted you". Carter apologizes to Julie and explains that Gomer knew nothing about the bet. Julie finds a little way to get back at Carter. Eddie Carroll as Sergeant Lubik.
58	28	"Gomer and the Father Figure"	Peter Baldwin	Bill Idelson & Sam Bobrick	April 1, 1966
Gomer is walking across a bridge at night. He sees old man C. B. Sinclair (Douglas Fowley) about to jump off the bridge. Gomer tries to cheer him up by buying him a meal. Sinclair tells Gomer that he was a wealthy man, but fell for a scam and was wiped out. Gomer feels bad for him and gives him some money. Sinclair comes by the base and Carter sees Gomer give him some money. Carter and Boyle see Gomer buying another meal for Sinclair. Carter thinks Sinclair's conning Gomer and wants to know more about him. Carter talks to Sinclair and falls for his story as well. Carter tells Boyle that Sinclair was a Marine hero in World War II. That night, Carter and Gomer see Sinclair pulling the same jumping off the bridge stunt with a sailor. Sinclair tells the sailor that he was in the Navy in World War II. Figuring he's a crook, Carter and Gomer go to see a Police Sergeant (Ken Lynch). They learn Sinclair is a con man with several aliases. Gomer still feels sorry for Sinclair. Carter and Gomer almost fall for another of Sinclair's scams. But in the end, Sinclair is arrested. After the police take Sinclair away, Carter realizes his pocket had been picked.
59	29	"Desk Job for Sergeant Carter"	Peter Baldwin	Harvey Bullock	April 8, 1966
The men are on a training mission and Gomer is messing a few things up. Captain Buttrey (David Frankham), who is there, offers Carter a temporary two week desk job writing training manuals. Though he'd like to take it, Carter feels that his men still need him. Duke suggests to Boyle that he could fill in if Carter took the job. After Gomer does something stupid, Carter changes his mind and puts Boyle in charge of the platoon. Carter doesn't think Boyle could deal with the headaches. Boyle finds that filling in for Carter was more work than he anticipated. Gomer visits Carter and tells him Boyle is doing a great job and everything is running smooth. After a week, Buttrey offers Carter a permanent position. But he turns it down, still thinking the platoon will fall apart without him. Meanwhile, hoping to keep Carter away for another week, Duke gets everyone to make the place spotless. When Carter comes by he is surprised and disappointed at how well things are going without him. Carter decides to take the permanent job. When Gomer finds out what Carter did, he goes back and messes things up in the barracks to bring Carter back. William Christopher as Corporal Haynes.
60	30	"Gomer, the Would-Be Hero"	Peter Baldwin	Dale McRaven & Carl Kleinschmitt	April 15, 1966
Carter is in a restaurant with his ex-girlfriend Barbara (Joy Harmon). Gomer comes in and Carter has to explain to him who Barbara is. He also asks Gomer not to mention her to Bunny. Just then, Carter sees a man trying to rob Sam (Ralph Manza), the owner, at the cash register. Carter foils the robbery. Police quickly arrive and Carter gives all the credit to Gomer because he doesn't want Bunny to find out who he was with. Gomer feels bad about the lie, but he also doesn't want Bunny to break up with Carter. Don Mills (Ted Knight), from a local radio station, asks Carter if he could interview Gomer. Gomer feels bad that he's perpetuating the lie. Carter tries to tell his fellow officers that he was the real hero, but none of them believe him. He even has Gomer tell them the truth, but they think Carter just coerced Gomer. Gomer tells Carter that Company A wants him to show the judo he used to catch the crook. Bunny can tell there's something bothering Carter. Gomer tells Duke and Frankie the truth. Gomer and Carter go to speak with the Chaplain (Peter Hobbs). Gomer, Carter and Bunny are at the restaurant. After Carter stops a drunk from attacking Sam, the truth comes out. The next day Don Mills interviews Carter, but Gomer winds up doing all the talking. Alan Dexter as Sergeant Schaeffer. Patrick Waltz as Policeman.

=== Season 3 (1966–67) ===
No. overall	No. in season	Title	Directed by	Written by	Original release date
61	1	"Lies, Lies, Lies"	Coby Ruskin	Arnie Rosen	September 14, 1966
Duke tells Hummel (William Christopher) and Gomer that he's going on a date with a Go-Go dancer. Carter thinks that Duke is making up how beautiful the woman is. Gomer tells Carter he's going on a Hollywood bus tour. Gomer asks the bus driver to stop at movie star Tina Tracy's (Deborah Walley) house, so he can take a picture. Gomer gets off the bus and because he takes too long, the bus leaves without him. He then meets Tina working in her yard and he spends the afternoon with her. Back at the base, Duke tells Hummel that the dancer turned out to be married with two kids. Gomer tells Duke that he met Tina and that she has invited him and a couple friends to a barbecue at her mansion. Duke doesn't believe him at first, but Gomer convinces him. The next day, Gomer and several of his friends show up at Tina's house. The Butler tells them that Tina is not home and has been in Europe. Carter and the men are furious with Gomer and leave him there. Tina arrives and apologizes to Gomer for what the Butler said. She forgot to tell him she invited the men over. Gomer comes back to the base and they still do not believe him. Tina comes to the base to pick everyone up. After an embarrassing introduction, the men finally make it to Tina's house. Carter winds up falling in the pool.
62	2	"Crazy Legs Gomer"	Coby Ruskin	Harvey Bullock & R.S. Allen	September 21, 1966
Sgt. Hacker's (Allan Melvin) platoon keeps winning competitions against Carter's men. Which means Carter keeps losing bets to Hacker. Duke tells Carter that new transfer Pfc. Larsen (Rod Lauren) is really good at archery. Carter hopes to finally win a bet. Gomer, not thinking, tells Hacker all about Larsen. Hacker gets new transfer Charlie Yellow Bear (Larry Duran), who is also an archery expert. Hacker wins another bet. Boyle tells Carter that Hacker must have been tipped off about Larsen. Carter finds out that it was Gomer. Carter learns that Gomer can run really fast. Carter and Hacker make a foot race bet. Carter even gets Hacker to pick Gomer. Hacker finds out Gomer is really fast and comes up with a plan to get Gomer to lose on purpose. Carter learns Hacker's scheme and then plans to win big by betting against Gomer. However, things do not go as Carter planned and Gomer wins. Victor Brandt as Corporal Jensen.
63	3	"Gomer, the Carrier"	Coby Ruskin	Rick Mittleman	September 28, 1966
Carter is not feeling well. After going to sick bay, it is learned that Carter has the German measles and is quarantined. Carter tells Boyle he doesn't mind as it is a vacation away from Gomer. Gomer breaks quarantine and visits Carter. Gomer brings him some gifts and Carter kicks him out. After several days Carter is better and released. Then the whole platoon comes down with the disease except Gomer. Instead of a vacation from Gomer, Carter is stuck with just him and it is driving him crazy. After talking to Boyle in sick bay, Carter comes up with an idea. He sends Gomer to the sick bay hoping he gets exposed to the measles. The whole platoon is released and then Carter has a relapse. He figures at least he's free of Gomer. That is, until Gomer comes down with the measles and it is just the two of them in sick bay. Carter gets released not to long after. He figures because it is Gomer's first bout with the measles, he'll be in sick bay for much longer. Just then, Gomer comes by saying he's all better.
64	4	"Caution: Low Overhead"	Coby Ruskin	Ray Brenner & Barry E. Blitzer	October 5, 1966
It is pay day at the base. Gomer runs into Friendly Freddy, who smooth talks him into buying an expensive looking gold watch for $12.95. Gomer shows the watch to Carter who says the watch is either phony or stolen. Carter is tired of his men getting ripped off. Carter confronts Freddy and falls for his explanation as to how he could sell the watch so cheap. Carter winds up buying a fur piece from Freddy. Bunny, Carter and Gomer are at a club. Bunny is thrilled when Carter gives her the fur. But while she's dancing with it, the fur starts to fall apart. Bunny runs off crying because Carter bought her a fake fur. Gomer tells Duke what happened. Just then, Hummel comes in and shows them the watch he just bought. Gomer goes to track down Freddy. Freddy makes up another story. When Gomer mentions the police, Freddy gives Gomer the money back for the fur. To make it up to Bunny, Carter takes her to a fancy restaurant. When Carter goes to pay the bill, he learns that the money Freddy gave him was counterfeit. Bunny is furious with Carter. The next day, Gomer tells Carter that his watch left a mark on his wrist and it stopped working. Roger Til as Maitre d'. Note: This is the first of four episodes to feature Sid Melton as Friendly Freddy.
65	5	"Show Me the Way to Go Home"	Coby Ruskin	Bill Idelson & Sam Bobrick	October 12, 1966
While coming back from a movie, Gomer and Duke come across Harry Purcell (Keenan Wynn), who is quite drunk. Duke has guard duty and he doesn't think Gomer should get involved. Using Harry's car, Gomer drives him home. Harry insists that Gomer meet his wife, Iona (Pert Kelton). She accuses Gomer of getting Harry drunk. The next day, Gomer tells Duke what happened. A sober Harry comes by the base. He thanks Gomer for bringing him home and wants to buy him dinner. That night at dinner, Harry gets drunk again. Gomer brings him home and gets yelled at again by Iona. The next day, Iona speaks with Carter. She says her husband doesn't drink and Gomer is making him an alcoholic. Carter has a hard time believing what she's tells him. Boyle tells Carter that maybe Gomer has started drinking. Carter orders Gomer to stay away from Harry. Gomer goes to a diner in town and Harry stumbles in drunk. Harry wants Gomer to dance with him. Carter comes in and Harry admits that Gomer never drank with him. Carter says he'll take care of Harry and sends Gomer away. Carter wants to put Harry in a cab. Iona shows up and starts yelling at Carter.
66	6	"How to Succeed in Farming Without Really Trying"	Coby Ruskin	Rick Mittleman	October 19, 1966
Gomer has taken up gardening, much to Carter's displeasure. During an inspection of the barracks, Carter find plants and shovels by Gomers bunk. He tells Gomer to get rid of the stuff. Col. Gray actually likes that Gomer has a garden and wants to do a human interest story about it. Carter still cannot believe that Gomer's gardening. Boyle tells Carter that Gray is a gardener as well. Carter wants to prank Gomer. He gets a watermelon and spikes it with vodka. Carter hopes that Gomer will eat it and get sick. Gomer is surprised that only the one watermelon grew so fast. Carter and Boyle try to explain how it could've happened. Later, Gomer tells Carter that he gave the watermelon to Col. Gray. A panicked Carter now needs to get the watermelon back. Gomer and Carter go to the mess hall. Hacker shows them a whole bunch of watermelons. Carter cuts them all open, not finding Gomer's. Hacker is furious that Carter cut them all. An attempt to retrieve the watermelon at Gray's house fails. Gray tells Gomer and Carter that his wife served it at a luncheon and everyone loved it.
67	7	"Gomer and the Little Men from Outer Space"	Coby Ruskin	Bill Idelson & Sam Bobrick	October 26, 1966
Carter finds a doll in Gomer's foot locker. Gomer says that's his lucky troll doll. Meanwhile, a movie film crew is rehearsing a scene with a flying saucer and little men from outer space. On his way to pick up something for the motor pool, Gomer drives by and thinks he's seen real aliens. Gomer tells Carter what he saw and Carter thinks he's making it up. Carter sends him back out to get the motor pool stuff. Gomer drives by again. This time the actors decide to have some fun with Gomer. Gomer tells Carter that the aliens tried to communicate with him. Carter now thinks Gomer is hallucinating. Carter consults with the base Psychiatrist (Richard Bull). He says that Gomer may just be seeking Carter's attention. Gomer leaves his jeep near the movie set to look around. The Director (Stuart Nisbet) has one of the actors move it. Boyle shows Carter an article in the paper about farmers that saw strange flying objects. Gomer tells Carter he saw the alien take the jeep. The Psychiatrist tells Carter to go with Gomer to check it out. Gomer and Carter drive out and find the jeep right where Gomer left it. Gomer sees two of the actors. By the time he gets Carter, they have gone. Gomer is disappointed that Carter doesn't believe him. Carter finds out about the movie and tells Gomer. Johnny Silver as 2nd Martian.
68	8	"The Borrowed Car"	Coby Ruskin	R.S. Allen & Harvey Bullock	November 2, 1966
Carter is going fishing for the weekend. He tells Boyle to keep an eye on his car. Gomer speaks to Bunny, who didn't know Carter was going away. She tells Gomer that Carter was supposed to deliver charity items that he had in the trunk of his car to a rummage sale. Duke tries to talk Gomer out of taking Carter's car. Gomer gets into an accident with the car. Gomer says that the brakes failed and he ran into a truck. They still have the whole weekend, so Duke tells Gomer to get the car fixed before Carter comes back. Carter returns when he remembers that he was to drop off Bunny's items. He sees the car is missing and Boyle shows him the keys in the desk. Believing it was stolen, Carter calls the police. Because of all the damage to the car, the Mechanic (Herbie Faye) tells Gomer it will take 4 to 5 days to repair. Gomer begs him to rush it and the Mechanic says OK. A policeman comes by and Gomer gets arrested for stealing the car. Gomer tries to explain things to Sgt. Welbeck (Emile Meyer), but Welbeck thinks all the stuff in the car's trunk was stolen. Carter gets a call from the police that his car was found. The police bring Bunny in as well. Carter shows up and after much discussion, charges are dropped. Bunny stands up for Gomer when Carter finds out the car was in an accident. After Carter gets his car back, he backs it into a garbage truck.
69	9	"Gomer Pyle, Super Chef"	Coby Ruskin	Barry E. Blitzer & Ray Brenner	November 9, 1966
Carter, Boyle and Hacker are playing cards. Gomer comes by with Carter's uniform he picked up from the cleaners. When Carter looks at it, it is a woman's uniform and Carter gets upset. Hacker tells Carter that he just doesn't know how to handle Gomer. Carter and Hacker then make a $50 bet that Hacker can get Gomer to prepare a meal within one week. Carter tells Gomer it is just a temporary assignment and to just be himself. It is Gomer's first day in the mess hall and he already makes a mess of things. Carter's happy when he learns what happened. And things do not get any better. One day, Gomer makes the mashed potatoes and they are horrible. Even Hacker cannot eat them. It is the last day of the bet. Col. Gray informs Hacker that Col. Driscoll (G. D. Spradlin) will be visiting the base. Driscoll will be eating at the mess hall and have what the other men will have. Hacker tells Carter that if the food is no good, they will both be in trouble. They get to the mess hall, but it is too late. Gomer is already serving Driscoll his meal. They start to panic. Driscoll tells Carter and Hacker that he just had the best Southern meal he's had in a long time. Turns out Gomer couldn't make what was planned, so he just prepared what he remembered from childhood. Hacker's new found confidence in Gomer may backfire at a later time, though.
70	10	"Marry Me, Marry Me"	Coby Ruskin	Carl Kleinschmitt & Dale McRaven	November 16, 1966
After leaving a movie theatre, Gomer meets Alice Borden (Francine York). They share a common interest in horror films. They go to have a soda and Duke sees Gomer with a pretty girl. The next night, Gomer and Alice go on a date and she introduces him to her brother Lloyd (Anthony Eisley). Gomer agrees that it would be nice to spend more time together and Alice takes it as a marriage proposal. Carter thinks she tricked Gomer into marriage for his paychecks. Gomer finds it hard to believe. Carter says he'll prove it by getting Alice to go after him because he earns more money than Gomer. Carter and Alice get engaged and she writes a goodbye letter to Gomer. What Gomer and Carter do not know is that Alice and Lloyd are actually married. When Carter gets home, he calls Alice and breaks the engagement. Carter tells Gomer they are both off the hook. Alice and Lloyd tell Col. Gray they are suing Carter for 'breach of promise' (a legal action nearly impossible to prove). Gray tells Carter to find a way to get out of this. Later, they tell Carter they will take an out of court settlement. They want $500 by Friday. To make things right, Gomer agrees to marry Alice. Things go back and forth until Carter says that Gomer will sue for breach of promise. Alice and Lloyd sneak out and drive off. Note: This episode uses the same basic plot as The Andy Griffith Show episode "Barney on the Rebound".
71	11	"Cold Nose, Warm Heart"	Coby Ruskin	Rick Mittleman	November 23, 1966
Gomer comes to Carter's office to get his pass. He hears a dog. Carter tells Gomer it is a birthday present for Bunny. Carter gives Bunny the puppy. She absolutely loves the dog, names him Tipper and spends all of her time with it. Carter cannot get Bunny to go out on a date with him. They spend all their time in Bunny's apartment. Boyle suggests getting a dog sitter. Gomer agrees to sit with the dog. Bunny is hesitant at first, but then she thinks it is a good idea. While on the date at the restaurant, Gomer keeps calling Bunny with questions about the dog. Carter is starting to get irritated. Later on the date, Bunny gets worried about Tipper and wants Carter to take her home. Tipper whines when Gomer starts to leave. Bunny asks Gomer to stay a while longer, which doesn't sit well with Carter. Carter now regrets giving Tipper to Bunny. Carter makes up a story that Tipper's Mother misses him and they have to return the puppy. Gomer ruins Carter's plan when he brings Tipper's Mother to visit. He says he got the OK from the owner to have the Mother visit a couple times a week. Carter then takes the dog to a pet shop and claims Tipper ran away. Gomer ruins that plan when he sees Tipper at the pet shop and brings him back. Carter has to reimburse Gomer the money he spent to buy the dog.
72	12	"Follow That Car"	Coby Ruskin	Barry E. Blitzer & Ray Brenner	November 30, 1966
The state police have asked the Marines help in setting up roadblocks to find smugglers. Gomer and Duke are at one roadblock. Because Gomer talked to a woman driver (Lillian Bronson) too long, they miss their ride back to the base. Gomer and Duke then hitch a ride with a Mr. Burton (Alan Hewitt). After being dropped off at the base, Gomer and Duke realize they left their large expensive military radio in Burton's trunk. Carter is furious because he signed for that radio. Remembering that Burton was staying in town, Gomer takes Carter to look for him. They find two cars that look like Burton's car. Gomer and Carter break into both trunks, finding nothing. When they spot the police, they hide in the one trunk. The car drives off with them inside. The car goes through a car wash and they get soaked when they open the trunk. They talk to Burton and he says the radio is in his hotel room. Winds up that Burton is the smuggler and he kidnaps Carter and Gomer. Burton and his partner Nick take the Marine uniforms and the radio. They leave Gomer and Carter tied up in the room. Gomer and Carter free themselves and find some police. In the end, the smugglers are caught because of the bad water pump that Gomer told them about. Gomer and Carter leave the radio in the police car trunk. Harry Lauter as Cop #1. William Bramley as Cop #2.
73	13	"It Takes Two to Tangle"	Coby Ruskin	Rick Mittleman	December 14, 1966
Gomer and Duke are in a new restaurant. They see Bunny with another man. The next day Gomer keeps staring at Carter and Carter can tell that something's going on. Gomer finally tells Carter what he saw and that Bunny was going to meet the man again that night. Carter tries to down play what Gomer saw. Carter and Boyle go to the restaurant and see the man give Bunny a gift. Carter tells Boyle that two can play that game. The next day Bunny calls Carter and says that she had to work last night. Bunny wants to get together that night. Thinking she is going to break up with him, Carter lies and says he has to work. Carter makes a date with Shirley Sokolik. Carter asks Gomer to go out with Bunny. Carter makes sure Bunny sees him with Shirley. Later, Carter tells Gomer why he was with Shirley. Gomer sees Bunny with the man again and she is giving the gift back. Gomer tells Carter what he saw and says he should make up with her. Gomer finds out from Bunny that the man was Herman Hadler (Grant Sullivan), a jeweler. She was going to buy a ring for Carter's birthday, but now she's mad at Carter. Gomer gets Carter and Bunny back together. Murray Alper as Charlie the Bartender.
74	14	"Whither the Weather"	Coby Ruskin	Rick Mittleman	December 21, 1966
Col. Gray informs the platoon leaders that an old friend will be visiting and would like suggestions how to make things special. Hacker suggests painting the barracks inside and out. Gomer tells Carter they better not paint today because it is going to rain. Gomer has a funny little routine to make his forecasts. Gomer's prediction comes true. The next day Carter says they will paint indoors as the National Weather Service says it will rain. Gomer says they're wrong. Boyle tells Carter that maybe they should listen to Gomer. Gomer's predictions keep coming true. Gray mentions to Carter that his platoon is behind the others in getting the painting done. Gomer starts sneezing and Carter sends him to sick bay. Gray was going to have the reception for Clint Nuxley (Ray Montgomery) outside, but the weather calls for rain. After consulting Gomer, Carter tells Gray that the weather will be fair and they can still do it outdoors. Clint arrives and he's all prepared for rain. Clint tells Gray that whenever his shoulder is stiff, it is going to rain. Gray makes a bet with him that it won't. Just then, it starts to rain. Gomer has an explanation for his incorrect prediction.
75	15	"Love's Old Sweet Song"	Coby Ruskin	Bill Idelson & Sam Bobrick	December 28, 1966
Gomer and Duke are at a club listening to singer Lou-Ann Poovie (Elizabeth MacRae). Duke thinks she's good looking and Gomer thinks she could use some singing lessons. Carter is there as well and is smitten with Lou-Ann. Both Carter and Duke send her a note. After her song, she sits with Gomer and Duke. Turns out she's from a town not far from Gomer's home town of Mayberry. Both Carter and Duke try to make time with Lou-Ann. They wait for her after the show, but it is Gomer who inadvertently takes her home. The next night, Lou-Ann tells Carter and Duke she thinks she's in love with Gomer. Lou-Ann and Gomer spend a night together and she mentions an old boyfriend, Monroe. They broke up because he didn't want her to pursue a singing career. Gomer sings "500 Hundred Miles" to her. Lou-Ann tells Gomer that the first time she met Monroe, they were playing that song. Gomer says he thinks she misses Monroe and she kisses him. Gomer tells Carter what happened. Carter works it so he takes Lou-Ann home the next night and he starts to sing to her. She gets him to leave, but Carter thinks he made a good impression. Carter hears that Lou-Ann is getting married and he thinks it is to Gomer. But she's giving up singing and going to marry Monroe. Herb Vigran as Waiter.
76	16	"Gomer, the Recruiter"	Coby Ruskin	Barry E. Blitzer & Ray Brenner	January 4, 1967
Col. Gray is sending Carter to Hollywood to run a recruiting booth for the Marines. Carter is at his booth when suddenly Gomer shows up. He decided to visit his sergeant, so he hopped a bus to Hollywood. Gomer thinks he's helping Carter recruit a man, but he actually chases the man off. When Carter has to close the booth for a while, Gomer volunteers to run it. Carter reluctantly agrees as long as Gomer doesn't actually sign anyone up. Not far away, a bank is robbed. The Fugitive (Arthur Batanides) tries to hide by the booth. When he learns he'll be sent away quickly to an induction center, the Fugitive pressures Gomer into signing him up. After reading the newspaper, Gomer thinks it was the crook he signed up. Gomer and Carter go to the induction center to try and find the crook. Gomer points out the wrong man. He then tackles another man who turns out to be a doctor. Carter and Gomer stop a truck carrying Marines, but they turn out to be women. They go to a swearing in center and Gomer sees the crook. He almost gets away, but he is caught. Col. Gray is so happy the way things worked out that he is sending Carter and Gomer to man the booth for another week. Carter is not happy about being stuck with Gomer for a week. George N. Neise as Marine Officer. Walter Mathews as Truck Driver. Phil Arnold as Newsboy. Wayne Heffley as Marine Sergeant. Rob Reiner as 3rd Recruit.
77	17	"The Secret Life of Gomer Pyle"	Coby Ruskin	Bill Idelson & Sam Bobrick	January 11, 1967
Clarice (Hope Summers) holds a rug hooking class with some older women and Gomer on Sundays. Afterwards, Gomer is walking by the beach. He is stopped by Mike (Dave Willock) and Wendell (George Tyne). They get Gomer to pose for several pictures. Mike tells him that with trick photography, they will make Gomer look like he's having fun on the beach. They get Gomer to sign a release. They then pay Gomer, which he reluctantly accepts. The men are actually from Fun Girl magazine and they alter the pictures to show Gomer having fun with a lot of women. Carter sees the pictures in the magazine and wishes it was him. Then he realizes it was Gomer. Gomer sees the magazine, is angry and goes to find Mike and Wendell at the beach. Carter and Boyle follow him. George (Tim Herbert), from the magazine, is with Wendell and a bunch of girls. George has the girls surround Gomer and Carter sees this. Gomer tells George off and leaves. Carter gets Gomer to agree to take him with to what he does on Sundays. Boyle begs Carter to take him with, but Carter says next time. The next Sunday, Gomer takes Carter to the rug hooking class. Carter thinks Gomer was just getting back at him. Gomer gives Carter a rug he made with a Marine slogan and Carter's name on it. Carter fells bad for what he thought of Gomer.
78	18	"Go Blow Your Horn"	Coby Ruskin	Ray Brenner & Barry E. Blitzer	January 18, 1967
Gomer tells Carter how much he likes marching band music. Carter is trying to get work done and he is bothered by Gomer playing the ukulele. He gets a reluctant Boyle to stop Gomer. Later Gomer plays an Ocarina. Boyle doesn't have the heart to stop Gomer again. Carter now goes to stop Gomer. Gomer shows Carter all the instruments that he sent away for. Carter confiscates the instruments. Boyle tells Carter that he won't be satisfied until he gets rid of Gomer. Carter has a plan and he returns Gomer's instruments to him. Carter speaks to Sgt. Gilroy (Richard Erdman) of the Marine Band. When Carter learns that the band will go on tour for a year, he talks Gomer up even more to Gilroy. Gomer is actually excited about joining the band. Gomer has a chance to be the band tuba player and he'll audition for Gilroy in a few days. Gomer's practicing is starting to annoy the base. Carter has Gomer practicing in his office and it is driving Boyle crazy. Carter then drives Gomer around in the country to practice. Carter gets Gomer's transfer ready. Gilroy tells Carter that Gomer was excepted but he turned it down. Turns out Gomer declined the offer when he learned that he'd be separated from Carter for a year. Robert Patten as Officer. Song: Gomer sings "Ain't She Sweet".
79	19	"You Bet Your Won Ton"	Coby Ruskin	Barry E. Blitzer & Ray Brenner	January 25, 1967
Marine Joseph Debus (Eldon Quick) gets promoted. Gomer suggests that they throw him a farewell party. Gomer wants to invite Carter. Duke is against it, but Hummel agrees with Gomer. Gomer finds a Chinese restaurant and wants to try one of their meals. What he does not know is that the restaurant is a front for a gambling operation. Mr. Wong (James Hong) and Mrs. Wong (Frances Fong) try to get rid of Gomer. But he insists on eating there. Mrs. Wong is actually surprised when Gomer says the meal was very good. When Gomer leaves, two Detectives (Harry Hickox and Larry J. Blake) ask him about the place. But, he does not give them the information they were hoping for. Gomer calls Mr. Wong and tells him he will be holding the party there. The Wongs are now panicking but agree to host the party. Gomer asks Carter to come to the party. At first Carter is reluctant to go, but then Gomer says he wants Carter to give a speech. The Marines arrive at the restaurant and the Detectives are watching from outside. Just as Carter is about to speak, the Detectives and police raid the place. The police find no evidence gambling and leave. The Wongs decide to give up the gambling business. Carter gives his speech and bores all the Marines. Victor Sen Yung as Businessman. William Benedict as 1st Player. Spencer Chan as Man.
80	20	"Sue the Pants Off 'Em"	Coby Ruskin	Ray Brenner & Barry E. Blitzer	February 1, 1967
While in town, a distracted Gomer almost walks in front of a car and falls backwards. Wayne Henshaw (Bernie West), an ambulance chasing attorney, wants Gomer to sue the driver. Gomer tells Henshaw that he's not hurt. Gomer declines his offer to sue. Henshaw talks to Carter and tells him Gomer was in an accident. Henshaw wants Carter to convince Gomer to sue. Gomer hurt his back while digging ditches and Carter thinks it has to do with the accident. Henshaw wants Gomer to see Dr. Purdy (Jay Novello), who is an ambulance chasing doctor. Dr. Purdy intentionally hurts Gomer's back some more. When Carter sees Gomer with a cane, he tells Gomer to sue. Later, Henshaw tells Carter he found the driver, a Mr. Clark (John Stephenson). Henshaw, Purdy, Carter and Gomer go to Clark's hotel. Gomer really doesn't want to go through with this and says he's fine. They get to Clark's room. They discover he's a Marine Major whose just been transferred to the camp. Clark says his insurance company should take care of things, but Henshaw wants to settle out of court. Gomer says there was never anything wrong with him and he doesn't want to sue. Clark figures out that Purdy is not a doctor and Henshaw is not a lawyer. Clark tells Henshaw he wants him out of town in 24 hours. Henshaw still gives Carter and Gomer a bill. Carter figures a way out of the bill by pulling the same scam that Henshaw initially tried. Danny Dayton as Clarence Quimby.
81	21	"Gomer and the Card Shark"	Coby Ruskin	Bill Idelson & Sam Bobrick	February 8, 1967
Duke tells Gomer how much money he lost to Navy man Pete Evans (Buddy Lester) playing cards. Pete and his wife show up in the same diner that Gomer and Duke are in. Pete tells Duke about another card game the next night and then picks up Gomer's check. Carter hears about Duke's bad luck and decides to win money back from Pete. But Carter also gets cleaned out. Carter believes that Pete is a card shark, but he cannot prove it. Carter will however tell everyone else not to play cards with Pete. Gomer sees Pete and tells him Carter is going to give him a bad reputation. Up in his hotel room, Pete tries to prove to Gomer that he's not crooked. He gets Gomer to play cards and Gomer wins a lot of money. Pete's wife Sheila is worried that people will find out he got chased out of New Jersey for being a card shark. And he's wearing a phony Navy uniform to make the "suckers" think that he's a military man. Carter is still suspicious and wants Gomer to go back and play Pete again. Gomer does and wins big again. As part of his plan, Pete says he won't play Gomer again. Carter forces Gomer to go back and Carter and Duke go with him. During the last hand of the night, Pete slips up and gets caught cheating. Richard Crane as Police Lieutenant. Darwin Joston as 1st Man.
82	22	"To Re-Enlist or Not to Re-Enlist"	Coby Ruskin	Rick Mittleman	February 15, 1967
Carter learns from Boyle that Gomer's 3 year hitch in the Marines is up soon. Boyle tells Carter that he better expect Gomer to re-enlist. Meanwhile, Duke and Hummel tell Gomer they are going to re-enlist. To make sure Gomer doesn't, Carter wants to get Gomer used to civilian life. He buys Gomer a new suit as a going away present. Carter then gets Gomer a job at Gus's (Owen Bush) gas station. He takes Gomer to see landlord Mrs. Nelson (Jesslyn Fax) and gets Gomer an apartment to live in. Gomer feels funny that Carter is paying for everything. Carter asks Bunny if any of her girlfriends would be interested in Gomer. Bunny has Gomer meet Betty Lou Hanson and Carter really talks her up to Gomer. Boyle tells Carter that the Colonel wants him to speak to every man and encourage them to re-enlist. Boyle wants to know if Carter is going to talk to Gomer. Carter encourages the men to re-enlist. But he also says that if someone has a full life and a girl waiting for them, they should move on. Later, Gomer tells Carter that he was all set to go back home. But because of all the nice things he did, Gomer decided he couldn't leave Carter. Phil Arnold as Al. Song: Gomer sings "Going Home Train".
83	23	"Lou-Ann Poovie Sings Again"	Coby Ruskin	Bill Idelson & Sam Bobrick	February 22, 1967
Lou-Ann Poovie visits Gomer and tells him that she didn't marry her old boyfriend, Monroe. She says that she got her old singing job back at the Congo Club. Duke and Carter say hello and find out she's still single. Carter gives Gomer and Duke something to do so he can walk Lou-Ann to the gate. The men come to see her at the club that night. Boyle still thinks Lou-Ann cannot sing, but Carter doesn't care. Carter sends Gomer, Duke and Boyle away as he wants to be alone with Lou-Ann. Duke sneaks back in to the club. Both Carter and Duke fall asleep at the club and miss Lou-Ann. The next day, Carter asks Lou-Ann out to dinner as a celebration of her being back. She suggests having the dinner at her place. When Carter shows up, he is surprised to see Gomer and Duke there. Carter tells Boyle that it doesn't matter if the other men will continue to be around, as Lou-Ann will eventually see he's the better of the three. At the club, Gomer and Duke are surprised when Carter asks them to sit with him. This goes on for a couple nights and Carter thinks he's doing well with Lou-Ann. Carter asks her if she had to pick one, who would it be? Lou-Ann picks Gomer. Herb Vigran as Waiter.
84	24	"Gomer, the Welsh Rarebit Fiend"	Coby Ruskin	Rick Mittleman	March 1, 1967
Duke and Gomer as for their passes. Carter doesn't think Gomer deserves one after he messed up on the infiltration course that morning, but he gives it to him. A new restaurant opens near the base and Gomer goes there and has their Welsh Rarebit. After Gomer has several orders of the dish, the waitress mentions that Welsh Rarebit is believed to cause nightmares. That night Gomer walks in his sleep and tells off Carter. Carter is furious, but Boyle convinces him that Gomer was asleep. The next day Gomer has more Welsh Rarebit. That night he tells Carter off again. Carter talks to Dr. Franklin (Richard Bull), camp psychiatrist. Franklin says that it is usually caused by an external stimulus, like something he may have eaten. If it doesn't clear up, Gomer will have to be discharged. Carter initially is not going to try and find out what's causing Gomer's problem, because he wants to get rid of him. But Boyle makes him change his mind and the two follow Gomer to the restaurant. When they discover that Gomer's been eating Welsh Rarebit, Boyle tells Carter he's heard it can cause bad dreams. Carter doesn't believe it and eats the meal. Both Carter and Gomer walk in their sleep that night. They confront each other. Gomer is confrontational and Carter is agreeable. Boyle wakes them up and tells them the meal caused it. Carter has a bad dream where he's Gomer and Gomer is him.
85	25	"Sing a Song of Papa"	Coby Ruskin	Aaron Ruben	March 8, 1967
Gomer and Duke go to the Jade Club and it turns out to be amateur night. Gomer remembers when Duke won an amateur night there impersonating Carter. Gomer tries to talk Duke into performing, but Duke gets a reluctant Gomer to go up. Gomer wins the contest singing "Oh My Papa". Joe (Sammy Shore), an employee of the club, tells Gomer the boss wants to see him. Nino (Anthony Caruso), the owner, tells Gomer how much he enjoyed his singing. He would like Gomer to come back the next night and sing the song again. The next day, Carter puts Gomer on guard duty for the night because he didn't have a clean rifle. Duke tells Nino what Carter did. Nino and Joe have Duke bring them to the base. Nino begs Gomer to come to the club and sing, but Gomer says he cannot leave his post. Gomer sings the song for him while he walks guard duty. When Carter stops Gomer's singing, Nino tries during the next few days to intimidate Carter into letting Gomer sing. Boyle tells Carter he shouldn't look for trouble with Nino and just let Gomer sing. Nino calls that base and has Gomer sing the song to him over the phone. Carter hangs up the phone. Joe continues to intimidate Carter. Joe brings Carter to the club. There Carter finds Gomer, Nino and Nino's Papa (Frank Puglia), who was flown in from Italy. That night Gomer sings the song again, this time in Italian for Papa. Milton Frome as M.C. Bob Winters as Juggler.
86	26	"Where There's a Will"	Coby Ruskin	Larry Markes	March 15, 1967
Gomer once again manages to anger Carter when he falls off a roof while painting and lands on Carter. Carter sends Gomer on a one-week special paratrooper training mission, as a way to get rid of him for awhile. As Gomer is leaving he hands Carter an envelope. Inside the envelope is a $10,000 life insurance policy Gomer has taken out and it names Carter as the beneficiary. Despite telling Boyle that Gomer did it just to needle him, Carter starts to feel guilty. That night, Carter has bad dreams about the policy. Carter tells Boyle he will get Gomer out of the paratrooper mission, but Carter is not able to. Carter tries another plan, but that backfires and Gomer still intends to jump out of a plane. Carter and Boyle watch the flight mission and one of the paratrooper's parachutes didn't open. Carter feels bad thinking that it was Gomer. They go searching for Gomer and do not find him. Carter is sure that Gomer didn't make it and he feels horrible. Suddenly they hear Gomer calling out for Carter and they find him hanging in a tree. When Gomer loosens his harness, he falls on Carter. Later, Gomer is painting on the roof again and Carter has another accident because of Gomer.
87	27	"Lost, the Colonel's Daughter"	Coby Ruskin	Ray Brenner & Barry E. Blitzer	March 22, 1967
Col. Gray's daughter, Janice, is coming for a visit. She's been working hard at college and he would like her to have a good time. Gray suggests to Carter that Gomer take her out because Gray feels that Gomer is very safe. At first Gomer doesn't want to go out with Janice because she might not enjoy his company. Gomer intends to take Janice to the movies and then for a hot fudge sundae. Janice has some very different ideas. She takes Gomer to a crowded go-go club, where Gomer loses her. Gomer goes back to the base to tell Carter what happened. They go to the club to look for Janice. Gomer finds her leaving in a car with a bunch of people. Janice says they've been invited to a party and Gomer should follow them. Carter and Gomer get to the party and find Janice. While trying to get Janice to leave, her outfit gets torn. The old lady who owns the building has called the police. Janice, Gomer and Carter are brought to the police station. An angry Col. Gray shows up with his wife Marcia. Carter, Gomer and Janice each says it is their fault. Col. Gray says it is his fault for being over protective. James Seay as Police Lieutenant. William Boyett as Policeman. Joseph V. Perry as Waiter. Rob Reiner as Beatnik. Lowell George as Guitarist. Warren Klein as Guitarist. Richie Hayward as Drummer.
88	28	"The Crow Ganef"	Coby Ruskin	Rick Mittleman	March 29, 1967
Gomer frees a crow that has its foot caught in some twigs. He names it Maxine after his cousin back home. Gomer realizes that Carter's birthday is coming up and he has no money for a present. Gomer asks Duke for a loan, but Duke is broke. Maxine comes to the barracks and brings Gomer a worm. Gomer wants to get Carter some cigars, so he looks around Carter's office to try and find out what brand he likes. Carter and Boyle catch him. Later, Carter takes off his watch and puts it on his desk. Maxine comes by, takes the watch and puts it by Gomer's locker. Maxine then takes several other of Carter's possessions. Carter starts to suspect Gomer, but Boyle thinks it is just a coincidence. Gomer goes to Harry's (Herbie Faye) Pawn Shop to get some money for Carter's gift. Carter comes up with a plan to go through the men's clothing to see if he finds anything. Carter finds a card to the pawn shop in the barracks. Carter and Boyle learn from Harry that Gomer was in the shop. Gomer gives Carter the cigars and tells him that he pawned his own watch to get them. Carter is relieved until he finds his stolen items on top of Gomer's locker. Gomer has no idea how the stuff got there. Just then, Maxine shows up with another one of Carter's things and the men figure out the bird was the thief.
89	29	"One of Our Shells Is Missing"	Coby Ruskin	Barry E. Blitzer & Ray Brenner	April 5, 1967
The men are going to have mortar practice at the usual place for the last time. A highway is to be built near by and construction is to start the next day. At the end, Gomer is missing a live mortar shell. The men search for it, but do not find it. Carter is upset because if one of the construction bulldozers hit it, someone may be killed. Boyle thinks some kids that they saw hanging around may have taken it. Boyle says they might try to sell it to a war surplus store. Carter and Gomer check with the Owner (Jesse White) of a local surplus store. The Owner thinks they are there to sell something. After looking a while, they find nothing. They then check with Harry at his Pawn Shop. They think they have found the shell and buy it. But it turns out to be part of a lamp. That night, Carter and Gomer go back to the firing range with a metal detector, but find nothing. Even later, an explosion goes off. Carter and Boyle find that a jeep and Gomer are gone. Carter fears the worse. Gomer comes back and explains that he found the shell in the mortar because it had misfired. Gomer then kicked the mortar and the shell fired. The next day, Carter embarrasses himself when he thinks a jeep was stolen by the surplus store Owner. Gomer finds the jeep.
90	30	"Lou-Ann Poovie Sings No More"	Coby Ruskin	Jack Elinson & Iz Elinson	April 12, 1967
Gomer tells Carter that he's going to see Lou-Ann sing and then take her out for pizza. Something Gomer says makes Carter think she is interested in him. Carter goes to see Lou-Ann as well. Gomer runs into Duke at the club. Gomer once again says that Lou-Ann's voice just is not that good. Duke says she has looks and that's all that matters. Carter arrives. Business is bad at the club and Lou-Ann is afraid she will lose her job. Later, Lou-Ann is thrilled when Duke gets her onto a radio show. Carter claims he can get her a record deal. Gomer shows up and tells her that he got her a job in a local record store. Lou-Ann is hurt that Gomer doesn't think she could get another singing job. Gomer comes by to speak to Lou-Ann. He says that he cares about her and doesn't want her to get hurt. Gomer says that her voice could use some improving. Lou-Ann tells Gomer he's cruel and asks him to leave. At the recording studio, Lou-Ann sings for record producer Richard O. Linke (Aaron Ruben). She hears her own voice played back and leaves the studio. Lou-Ann makes up with Gomer and takes the job at the record store. Eddie Quillan as Man. Note: The real Richard O. Linke is series co-owner, associate producer and Jim Nabors' manager.

=== Season 4 (1967–68) ===
No. overall	No. in season	Title	Directed by	Written by	Original release date
91	1	"A Visit from Aunt Bee"	Coby Ruskin	Bill Idelson & Sam Bobrick	September 8, 1967
Aunt Bee (Frances Bavier) makes a surprise visit to Gomer. She's unhappy with the barracks that Gomer has to live in. Aunt Bee helps Gomer with his barracks duty and mops the floor. She sends Gomer to the mess hall to get some vinegar to clean the windows. Carter comes by and finds out that Aunt Bee is a friend of Gomer's. Gomer comes back. Carter tells Aunt Bee that civilians are not allowed in the barracks. After she leaves the barracks, she hears Carter yelling at Gomer. Aunt Bee returns and questions Carter about his yelling. She finds out that Gomer is being punished for breaking rules. While leaving the base, Aunt Bee runs into reporter Johnny Clark (Tommy Noonan), who is doing a live radio show. He's interviewing friends and relatives of the men inside the camp. Aunt Bee tells Johnny about how badly Carter treated her and Gomer. Johnny invites her to talk more about it on his TV show the next night. Carter's superior hears what Aunt Bee said and is not happy about it. Carter has to pretend to be "Mr. Nice Guy" in case Aunt Bee returns. But when she shows up, Carter slips up and yells at Gomer. Gomer tries to explain to Aunt Bee how things are in the Marines. On the TV show, Aunt Bee actually stands up for Carter. Note: This was Noonan's final acting credit, as he would pass away just 7 months later.
92	2	"The Recruiting Poster"	Coby Ruskin	Jack Elinson & Iz Elinson	September 15, 1967
An artist is coming to camp to choose a marine to paint for a recruitment poster. Everyone assumes the artist will be a man. Carter thinks they should use a Sergeant like him. The artist arrives. Hacker believes he should be on the poster. Col. Gray introduces Leslie Forbes (Marian McCargo), the artist. Gray wants everyone to go about their business and Leslie will pick someone. Hacker and Carter vie for Leslie's attention. Leslie tells Gray that she has picked Gomer. Gray is quite surprised. She likes Gomer because everything Carter and Hacker did to him, he stood there and took it. Leslie says she will follow Gomer and make some sketches instead of having him pose for her. Because of something Gomer says, Carter thinks he's been picked. Carter gives Hacker a hard time because he wasn't picked. Carter sends Gomer to see how the painting is going. Gomer sees the painting of himself. While honored, he tells Leslie it should have been Carter because Carter made him the Marine that he is. Gomer cannot bring himself to tell Carter. Leslie unveils the painting of Gomer. But the painting now also has the watchful "eye" of Carter behind Gomer. Pat Morita as Chris Yamato.
93	3	"Corporal Carol"	Coby Ruskin	R.S. Allen & Harvey Bullock	September 22, 1967
Corporal Carol Barnes (Carol Burnett) arrives with several other female Marines. Meanwhile, Gomer calls Lou-Ann, who has been out of town for 3 weeks. Gomer meets Carol and he talks about how nice it was to talk to Lou-Ann, without mentioning Lou-Ann by name. But, Carol misunderstands and thinks he likes her. That evening, Gomer is to meet Lou-Ann at the cafe, but Carol gets there first. Carol drags Gomer out of the cafe and takes him to a drive-in movie. Gomer manages to call Lou-Ann and makes his apologies, setting up a date for the next evening. Carol tries to get romantic with Gomer, but it doesn't work. The next night at the cafe, Lou-Ann gets there first. Gomer arrives but gets trapped by Carol again, who was in another booth. Lou-Ann sees this and leaves. For the next two days, Gomer tries to get a hold of Lou-Ann. Lou-Ann finally tells Gomer she will give him one more chance. Gomer tries to tell Carol about Lou-Ann, but Carol misunderstands again. Carol goes with Gomer to see Lou-Ann and tells her Gomer prefers her. After Lou-Ann leaves upset, Gomer tells Carol it is Lou-Ann he prefers. Gomer tries to make Carol feel better. Using some Marine tactics, Carol straightens things out between Gomer and Lou-Ann. Carol then takes Gomer's advice in meeting another man. Melinda Casey as Girl Marine. Note: Frank Sutton doesn't appear in this episode.
94	4	"Leader of Men"	Coby Ruskin	Norman Paul	September 29, 1967
Gomer is assigned to help Hacker in the kitchen. Hacker is not happy because Gomer always makes a mess of things. Captain Courtney (Donald Buka) tells Hacker to make sure everything runs smoothly during the breakfast for visiting Congressman Judson Travers (Parley Baer). Courtney puts Gomer in charge of pouring coffee at the breakfast. After meeting Gomer, Judson realizes that they're both from the same district around Mayberry. Judson invites Gomer to sit at breakfast with him. Carter is worried Gomer will do something stupid in front of Judson, but then he sees they're taking a picture together. Judson suggests to Col. Gray and Brigadier General Dawson (Jeff Morrow) that Gomer be promoted. Carter is ordered to train Gomer to become a Corporal. A Corporal needs to be able to take command. As hard as he tries, Gomer is just not comfortable giving orders. Carter finally gives up. Gomer learns that it was Judson that insisted on the promotion. Carter is called into Col. Gray's office. Carter thinks that he'll be in trouble. But thanks to Gomer, he is actually commended by Gray and Judson. Judson asks Gray to try and make sure that Gomer and Carter are always together.
95	5	"Gomer, the Beautiful Dreamer"	Coby Ruskin	Rick Mittleman	October 6, 1967
Gomer sees Carter and Bunny in the Blue Bird Cafe. Gomer tells them that when he has the same dream three times in a row, it comes true. Carter is not interested, but Bunny finds it fascinating. Gomer says that Carter's uniform is going to get messed up. Thanks to Gomer, Carter gets chili spilled on him. Gomer tells Bunny he's had a dream about her twice, but he won't tell what it is about. The next day Bunny and Carter are in a grocery store. She hints at marriage. Gomer comes by and tells Bunny he had the dream a third time. Bunny wins a prize in the grocery store and part of it is a fancy dinner. The dinner is what Gomer dreamed. Later, Gomer tells Bunny that he dreamed twice that Carter proposes to her. Carter tells Boyle he has to stop Gomer from having that dream a third time. Instead of letting Gomer sleep, Carter gives him extra duty. Carter then dreams that he marrys Bunny. During the dream, Gomer is the organist, the preacher and the best man. Feeling the inevitable, Carter goes to reluctantly propose to Bunny. She turns him down because he's clearly not ready. Gomer comes by to say he had the dream a third time. Jack Riley as Larry.
96	6	"The Great Talent Hunt"	Coby Ruskin	Ray Brenner & Barry E. Blitzer	October 13, 1967
Boyle tells Carter about an upcoming talent contest. The winner will represent the Marines in D.C. Everyone is supposed to pick one man from their platoon. Carter is not interested until Hacker tells him he's entering a man named Brian Jones, who can sing. Carter learns that Hacker brought Jones in from the replacement pool after he found out that Jones went to a music conservatory. After a few bad auditions from Carter's men, Gomer sings. Carter gives him an application. Gomer meets Brian and learns he taught singing before the Marines. When Gomer finds out that Brian is also entered in the contest, he figures on dropping out. Brian wants to hear Gomer sing. Brian gives Gomer a few singing tips. Carter is still worried about Gomer's talent and goes to the replacement pool, but finds nothing. After he hears Gomer sing, Hacker is concerned that Brian is teaching Gomer too much and tells him to stop. Hacker and Carter try to sabotage each others guy's voices. At the audition, both Brian and Gomer sing so well, the winner was chosen with a coin toss. Gomer wins the toss. Because of something that Gomer says, Brian is happy to learn he will be made the vocal coach for the Marine Glee Club. Carter is thrilled because Gomer will be out of his hair for 3 weeks. Gomer tells Carter that he talked Col. Gray into letting Carter go with him on the trip. Note: During the audition, Jones sings "Santa Lucia" which is the song that Gomer started singing along with the choir in The Andy Griffith Show - Season 4, Episode 20: The Song Festers.
97	7	"Gomer Says "Hey" to the President"	Coby Ruskin	Rick Mittleman	October 20, 1967
Gomer and Carter get ready to leave for Washington D.C. Gomer hopes to do some sightseeing. Carter hopes to ditch Gomer and hook up with old acquaintance Rose Pilchek (Allison Hayes). At the hotel, Carter is surprised and disappointed when he has to share a room with Gomer. Carter tells Gomer he cannot go sightseeing with him as he has to visit an old friend of the family. Carter visits Rose, who is a waitress now. While Carter tries to make time with Rose, Gomer constantly calls him with tour updates. Gomer also annoys the tour guides. Gomer is in The White House and gets separated from the tour group. He winds up in the Oval Office. The Cleaning Lady, who is in the Office, asks Gomer how he got there. He tries to explain and suddenly she is gone. Gomer calls Carter at Rose's house to tell him where he is. The Cleaning Lady comes back with two Secret Service agents, who then detain Gomer. Carter is also brought in, but after being checked out, both are released. Gomer and Carter are walking down the street and Carter is yelling at him. Gomer is almost hit by a car. Just by chance, Gomer meets the President, who happens to be in the back of the car. Carter was hoping to take Rose to dinner alone, but she wants Gomer to tell her about the President. Herb Vigran as First Tour Guide. James O'Hara as Hotel Clerk. Gregg Palmer as Second Agent.
98	8	"And A Child Shall Lead Them"	Coby Ruskin	Barry E. Blitzer & Ray Brenner	October 27, 1967
Gomer wants to go sightseeing with Carter. Carter, however, wants to go see Rose Pilchek. Carter and Gomer find a young Japanese boy named Toki outside of the hotel. Because he can speak Japanese, Carter finds out Toki's address and wants to put him in a cab. Toki doesn't want to go alone, so Carter is forced to go with to translate. Carter calls Rose and she thinks it is very nice that he will help the boy. When Gomer, Carter and Toki get to the address given, it turns out to be an amusement park. Toki wants to go on some rides before giving Carter the right address. Carter calls Rose and she is starting to get upset. Now Toki claims he doesn't remember the address and Gomer thinks he has amnesia. They go on more rides. The next address Toki gives Carter is to a boat ride place. Carter calls Rose and she is getting really angry. After a boat ride, Toki gives another address. This time they arrive at a baseball stadium. Carter is going to leave to two at the stadium, but when Toki calls him "daddy", he changes his mind. While watching the game, Toki slips up and speaks English. Toki admits that he lives at the Japanese embassy. He apologizes and says that he just wanted to see things and make friends. Instead of taking Toki home, they stay to watch the rest of the game.
99	9	"The Show Must Go On"	Coby Ruskin	Norman Paul	November 3, 1967
In the hotel restaurant, Carter manages to irritate one of the patrons. The Navy Relief Show is that evening. Carter tells Gomer not to be nervous but Broadway Producer Dan Merrill (Roland Winters) will be producing the show. Carter tries to show Gomer how to act while performing. Carter and Gomer head off to the rehearsal. On the way, Carter manages to mess things up for the same man from the restaurant. They go to introduce themselves to Mr. Merrill and he turns out to be the man that Carter irritated earlier. They apologize to Merrill. While running through his song, Gomer does all the corny moves that Carter showed him. Mr. Merrill tells him to stop the moves and pick another song. Carter tells Mr. Merrill off. Colonel Richardson (James Sikking) tells Carter that Merrill almost walked off the production because of him. Because important people will be there, Carter has to do whatever Merrill says. When Carter tells Gomer the President might even be there, Gomer gets stage fright and loses his voice. It is almost time for the show and Carter tells Merrill about Gomer. Because of something the Guard (John Gibson) at the Lincoln Memorial says, Gomer gets his voice and courage back. Gomer goes to the show and performs beautifully. The next day, Carter loses his voice when he learns that the Commandant of the Marine Corp. is coming by to congratulate him and Gomer. Marcia Mae Jones as Waitress. Hal K. Dawson as Stage Doorman. Note: This episode is known for Nabors' performance of "The Impossible Dream". The United States Marine Corps Band guest stars as themselves.
100	10	"The Better Man"	Coby Ruskin	Story by : John Barbour & Whitey Mitchell; Teleplay by : John Barbour, Whitey Mitchell & Jack Elinson	November 10, 1967
Lou-Ann receives a telegram stating that her father is coming to visit the next day. She tells Gomer to come to dinner and meet him. Lou-Ann warns Gomer that her father can be a strong willed person. J. Randolph Poovie (Tol Avery) arrives and immediately talks about her old boyfriend, Monroe Efford (Med Flory). J. Randolph wonders why Lou-Ann left the former big college football star at the altar. She tells her father she didn't love Monroe. When Gomer shows up, he mentions how he makes paper flowers and hooks rugs. To drink, J. Randolph has a bourbon and Gomer has a root beer. J. Randolph is not impressed as he was hoping for a real "man's man". After Gomer says he'll probably go back to working at the gas station, J. Randolph believes Gomer has no ambition. J. Randolph calls Monroe and tells him to come to town. Lou-Ann is less than thrilled when Monroe comes by. Things become awkward when Gomer meets Monroe. J. Randolph keeps talking up Monroe, upsetting Lou-Ann. Something her father tells her, makes Lou-Ann a little unsure about Gomer. Lou-Ann is disappointed when Gomer doesn't assert himself after Monroe asks her out. After their date, Gomer runs into Lou-Ann and Monroe at the diner. Lou-Ann invites Gomer to sit with them, but he turns her down. Later, Lou-Ann tells Gomer that she's moving back home with her father. Gomer finally stands up for himself and declares his love for Lou-Ann to J. Randolph. Note: Frank Sutton doesn't appear in this episode.
101	11	"To Watch a Thief"	John Rich	Rick Mittleman	November 17, 1967
Carter wants to buy Bunny a $70 watch for her birthday. The only problem is he has no money. Carter tries to borrow the money from some of the other men on the base, with no luck. Gomer offers to loan him the money. Carter reminds Gomer that he would be court-martialed if he accepted any money from a person of lower rank. Carter talks counter woman Miss Johnson (Doris Singleton) into letting him buy the watch for 1 dollar as down payment. Gomer sees Carter take the watch and walk out and he thinks that Carter stole the watch. Gomer finds the watch in Carter's desk and brings it back to the store, setting it on the counter. Miss Johnson calls Carter to tell him he forgot the watch. Gomer sees Carter leaving the store again with the watch. Gomer again returns the watch. Carter finds the watch missing from his desk and asks Boyle if he took it. Miss Johnson again calls Carter and she wonders what's going on. Gomer reports it to the base Chaplain (Whit Bissell), who then speaks to Carter. Carter's not sure what the Chaplain is talking about. Gomer takes money out his bank account and buys the watch from Mrs. Healy (Jane Dulo), a different counter woman. Carter goes to the store to find the watch gone. He then finds the watch in his desk drawer. Miss Johnson calls Carter to apologize that his watch was sold to someone else by mistake. Gomer and Carter finally get things straightened out. Maudie Prickett as Bank Teller. Buck Young as Sergeant Haskall.
102	12	"The Prize Boat"	John Rich	Story by : John Barbour & Gordon Mitchell; Teleplay by : R.S. Allen & Harvey Bullock	November 24, 1967
A Driver (Frank Gerstle) drops off a speed boat for Gomer. Apparently he won it in a jingle writing contest. Gomer tells Carter that he plans to send the boat back because of the expense of owning one. Carter tells Gomer that he'll pay the expenses if Gomer makes him a partner with the boat. Carter envisions himself in the boat with a lot of beautiful women. The expenses start right away for Carter. While trying to tow the boat to the water, the rear bumper of Carter's car breaks off. Carter has the bumper replaced. Then a Policeman (Dabbs Greer) gives Carter several tickets for boat towing violations. Gomer and Carter talk to a man named Charlie (Charles Lane) about a boat license. When more expenses start to add up, Carter tries to get some of the other men to partner up with him. After hearing the costs, none of the men are interested. Gomer thinks they should sell the boat. Mr. Markham (Robert Cornthwaite) comes by to tell Carter that there is income tax to be paid on the boat. Carter thinks Markham is there to buy the boat, so Carter greatly over values the boat. He now has to pay tax on that amount. Lieutenant Norton tells Carter he'll buy the boat. Gomer and Carter put the boat in the water. As Gomer is removing the For Sale sign he nailed to the boat, he causes a leak and the boat sinks. Despite all that's happened, when Gomer mentions a contest where the prize is a convertible, Carter is interested.
103	13	"Friendly Freddy Strikes Again"	John Rich	William Raynor & Myles Wilder	December 1, 1967
Gomer wants to buy a friendship ring for Lou-Ann. The jewelry store salesman shows him some rings and Gomer picks one he likes. Gomer is disappointed when he finds out how expensive the ring is. When he leaves the store he runs into Friendly Freddy (Sid Melton). Freddy shows Gomer a pearl ring. Gomer figures it also will be too expensive, but Freddy says it is only $12. Gomer finds it hard to believe it is that inexpensive. Gomer buys it and gives it to Lou-Ann, who is thrilled with the ring. Later, Freddy talks to his supplier Harry Wendel (Paul Bryar). Apparently, Freddy sold Gomer a real ring worth $500. He has to pay Harry $500 or get the ring back. If he doesn't, Freddy could wind up in a grave. Freddy talks to Gomer and tells him the ring he sold him was a fake. Gomer says Lou-Ann would never take the ring off. Freddy is at a club with his girlfriend Stella and sees Gomer with Lou-Ann. Freddy makes it look as though Gomer has given the same type of ring to several other women. Something Carter does, makes it worse for Gomer. Lou-Ann wants to give her ring back to Gomer. Just then an FBI Man (Ken Lynch) comes and takes Freddy away. He wants Freddy to testify against Harry. It seems there never was a real ring and Harry was just scamming people to get the $500. Freddy does straighten things out with Lou-Ann. Timothy Blake as Cigarette Girl.
104	14	"Change Partners"	Peter Baldwin	R.S. Allen & Harvey Bullock	December 8, 1967
Gomer and Lou-Ann run into Bunny, who is waiting for Carter to pick her up. Bunny notices how well Gomer treats Lou-Ann. Carter shows up and Bunny invites Gomer and Lou-Ann to go with them to the movies. Carter would rather they didn't join them. After the movie, Bunny has the couple join them for a drive. Carter parks the car in the woods and he and Bunny go for a walk. Bunny mentions to Carter what a gentleman Gomer is. Gomer manages to ruin Carter and Bunny's alone time. Carter drops off Gomer and Lou-Ann and Bunny tells Carter he was very rude to them. Carter and Bunny head to the Jade club. Much to Carter's chagrin, Gomer and Lou-Ann show up there. Bunny insists that they sit with them. Bunny tells Carter that he could learn from Gomer about being thoughtful and kind. Bunny and Carter have a big fight and break up. Later, Gomer suggests that Lou-Ann speak to Carter and he'll speak to Bunny. On the rebound, Carter is attracted to Lou-Ann and Bunny is attracted to Gomer. Gomer dates Bunny and Lou-Ann dates Carter in an attempt to re-unite them with each other. And the plan works.
105	15	"Wild Bull of the Pampas"	Peter Baldwin	Ronny Pearlman	December 15, 1967
Col. Gray tells Carter that a Latin American military man named Manuel Cortez (Larry Storch) is coming to camp. He wants to observe the Marine Corps in action in order to help his country's armed forces. Carter asks Cortez to choose one of his men to be a personal guide and he picks Gomer. Carter tries to talk Cortez out of picking Gomer. Cortez tells Gomer and Carter that he is just a Corporal. Cortez tells Gomer that the name of the country he comes from is 'The Thirteenth Federated Constitutional Republic of Greater San Miguel'. It is a very small place behind a mountain somewhere near Brazil. Cortez has invited a stewardess he met on the plane to the camp. Gomer tells him that Consuela is a civilian and not allowed on the base. Carter insists she leaves and Consuela gets mad at Cortez. Gomer shows Cortez around the base and how the Marines do things. When Cortez does things he's not supposed to, Carter yells at Gomer. Cortez tries to tell Carter it wasn't Gomer's fault. Because Carter insulted Gomer, Cortez also feels insulted. Cortez challenges Carter to a duel. When Carter refuses, Cortez tells Gomer that Carter is weak and must be overthrown. Cortez thinks Gomer should be the leader and tells Carter. Carter loses his temper with Cortez and starts yelling at him. Gray walks in on the yelling and fills in Carter and Gomer on the rank Cortez really holds. Cortez is really a General and commander of his Army, Navy and Air Force. Cortez apologizes and says that he has learned many things. Something Gomer says also teaches Cortez something about himself. Note: Nabors and Storch sing the Mexican classic Cielito Lindo in this episode.
106	16	"Gomer, the Good Samaritan"	Peter Baldwin	Ray Brenner & Barry E. Blitzer	December 22, 1967
Col. Gray tells Carter that he wants Gomer to pick up General Pete Prescott (Don Haggerty) in Los Angeles and bring him to Camp Henderson. Because the General is so punctual, Carter wants to send Gomer 7 hours early just in case. On the way, Gomer stops to help an old woman (Madge Blake) with a dead car. He pushes her car with the Staff car all the way to her home and he then gets lost in Van Nuys. Gomer calls Carter for directions. Because he gets stuck in one lane of traffic, Gomer winds up in Santa Monica. He calls Carter again. On the way, Gomer stops to help a man named Gino Barbella get home with his groceries. Gino insists he have lunch and meet his wife, Cara (Argentina Brunetti). Gomer winds up looking a family pictures. Gomer calls Carter because now he's in Pasadena. Gomer drives a Den Mother (Barbara Perry) and her scout troop to a bus stop. Gomer asks a Gas Station Attendant (Eddie Carroll) for directions. But then he drives the scout troop to Disneyland. After a few more calls to Carter, Gomer makes it to the General's hotel. A Cab driver needs Gomer's help and Gomer drives right past Prescott standing on the sidewalk. Prescott calls Gray and is furious. Gray and Carter drive to the hotel and find out Prescott is at the hospital. At the hospital, Gray and Carter find Gomer, Prescott, the Cab driver, policemen and a photographer. Because of Gomer, a woman was able to deliver her baby safely. Prescott is quite pleased with Gomer and insists Gomer drive him to the camp. Carter gets lost on the way back.
107	17	"Gomer, the Privileged Character"	Peter Baldwin	Rick Mittleman	December 29, 1967
Col. Gray tells Carter that he would like to have Gomer sing at a show they will be putting on. Gomer really doesn't want to do it. Gomer questions Carter every time he's requested to go the rehearsal. Gomer tells Carter that he feels bad that he's not pulling his own weight at camp. Carter says that things are going smoothly without him. Carter tells Gomer he'll be excused from his regular duties. Some of the soldiers tease Gomer about being a privileged character. Hummel tells Gomer not to worry about it. Gomer feels bad and decides to do some of the work he missed at night. Lieutenant Barnett (Fred Beir) catches him one night and sends him back to the barracks. But working at night winds up wearing Gomer out. Gomer starts to be late for rehearsals. Carter learns from Barnett what Gomer's been doing. The night of the show Carter finds Gomer asleep. Gomer sings a song beautifully then goes offstage and falls asleep. Carter explains to Gray why Gomer is asleep. Carter finds a way to get Gomer to sing an encore. The next day, Gray compliments Carter for instilling that work ethic in Gomer. Wayne Heffley as Corporal Crowder. Albert Popwell as M.P. Songs: Gomer sings "The Desert Song" and "Song Of The Vagabonds".
108	18	"Gomer Goes Home"	Coby Ruskin	William Raynor & Myles Wilder	January 5, 1968
Gomer is going home to Mayberry for a weeks leave. He didn't write to anyone there about his trip because he wanted it to be a surprise. Gomer cannot leave soon enough for Carter. Gomer arrives in Mayberry and goes to the courthouse, but finds no one there. He finds a picture of Barney Fife. Gomer flashes back to when he told Andy that he joined the Marines. Capt. Rogers (James Seay) comes in and tells Gomer that Andy is on a camping trip. Aunt Bee and Opie went with him. Gomer says hi to Mr. Ferguson (Burt Mustin), who tells him Floyd the barber retired. Gomer runs into Mrs. Petrie (Mary Young), who thinks Gomer has only been gone a couple weeks. Gomer then goes to Goober's gas station. Virgil (Dennis Fimple), who works there, tells Gomer that Goober is with Andy. Virgil goes on a service call, so Gomer volunteers to work at the station. While there, Gomer gets robbed by two men, Bronson (Arthur Batanides) and Kaylor. Gomer tries to describe the men to Capt. Rogers, but he's not much help. Gomer goes searching and finds the crooks abandoned car and gets it running. He runs into the crooks and they force him to drive them away. They eventually run into the police and the crooks get arrested. As Gomer is leaving on the bus, he sees Andy and the rest pull up to the courthouse. But he cannot get them to notice him. Note: Cameos by Andy Griffith, Ron Howard, Frances Bavier and George Lindsey.
109	19	"A Dog Is a Dog"	Coby Ruskin	Bill Idelson & Harvey Miller	January 12, 1968
Col. Gray is going on a personal weekend with his wife and asks Carter to watch their German shepherd, Prince. In order to keep his date with Bunny, Carter lets Gomer watch the dog. Three hours later, Gomer comes back and tells Carter the dog ran off. Gray calls Carter and Carter starts to panic when Gray asks about Prince. Gray lets him know that Prince made it up to the cabin where he is staying. Carter and Gomer come to retrieve the dog, but Gray suggests that the dog just stay. Gomer assures Gray that everything will be OK if they take the dog. It is not long before Prince runs off again. Gomer and Carter drive around looking for the dog. Carter calls Gray, and without Carter actually asking him, Gray says the dog is not with him. They go to the pound and believe they've found Prince. Carter has to pay the Attendant (Billy Halop) for a dog license. They then get a call about another dog that fits Prince's description. Now Gomer is not sure that the dog they have is Prince. They go and get the other dog as well. Carter has to pay the man (Leonard Stone) a "reward". Then a third German shepherd shows up. Gray is back from his trip and Carter comes up with a plan to find out which dog is Prince. The plan doesn't work and Gray sees the three dogs. Gray then tells Gomer and Carter that the real Prince showed up at the cabin again. Now Carter is stuck with three dogs and has to pay to get rid of them.
110	20	"Love Finds Gomer Pyle"	Coby Ruskin	William Raynor & Myles Wilder	January 19, 1968
Jill and Molly, two teenage girls, are at the Blue Bird cafe. Paul comes by and asks Jill's help with a school paper. They leave Molly alone. Gomer helps Molly out by paying for her soda when she doesn't have any money. The next day, Molly shows up at the base and offers to buy Gomer a soda. Gomer says he was supposed to meet someone, but he has a little time. Lou-Ann shows up at the cafe and Gomer explains how he met Molly. The three wind up going to a movie together. Molly tells Jill how much she likes Gomer despite him being older. Gomer gets in trouble with Carter when he's caught talking to Molly while on guard duty. Molly now keeps showing up during Gomers dates with Lou-Ann. Lou-Ann is getting a little annoyed with Molly. She finally tells Gomer that Molly has a crush on him. Lou-Ann says that Gomer has to find a way to let her down gently. Gomer talks to Molly and she tells him how Paul is so conceited and he always makes eyes at all the girls. Gomer senses that Molly actually likes Paul. Molly also mentions that Jill is having a party. Gomer suggests going to the party together. After Gomer dances with Molly, Paul takes an interest in Molly and she gains the confidence she needs. The other girls at the party take an interest in Gomer.
111	21	"Gomer and the Queen of Burlesque"	Coby Ruskin	Barry E. Blitzer & Ray Brenner	February 2, 1968
Hacker and Cpl. Jensen (Victor Brandt) think Gomer is a sucker for giving a panhandler a quarter. The panhandler said he wanted the money for food, but Hacker tells Gomer he'll just buy booze. Hacker tells Gomer he'll believe anything. As a joke, Hacker wants to set Gomer up with burlesque dancer Lila St. Clair (Fay Spain). Lila says she doesn't "dig" practical jokes. But then she says she'll do it for $50. Hacker introduces Lila to Gomer and says she's his cousin and a school teacher from out of town. Gomer takes Lila to a movie. After she says she could use a drink and Gomer takes her for an ice cream soda. Clearly Lila is having a lousy time, but Gomer doesn't notice. The next afternoon Gomer takes Lila to a flower show and then an old Mission. Gomer gradually works his magic on her and she admits to having a nice day. Now to show him things aren't always what he thinks, Hacker has Gomer meet Lila at her place of work. Lila admits to Gomer that she's not a school teacher and she asks Gomer to leave. Hacker shows up and makes Gomer stay. Gomer finds out Lila is an exotic dancer. Lila sees Gomer is in the audience. After her performance, Gomer gives Lila a present and she tells him about Hacker's plan. Gomer says he's still happy that they became friends and he accepts her for who she is. Hacker comes by with Lila's $50 and she gives it back to him. Phil Arnold as Man. Murray Alper as Doorman. Note: Frank Sutton doesn't appear in this episode.
112	22	"The Carriage Waits"	Coby Ruskin	Bill Idelson & Harvey Miller	February 9, 1968
A large package arrives for Gomer from a department store. It turns out to be a baby buggy and Gomer says it has to be a mistake. Gomer calls the store, but gets nowhere. He decides to take it back to the store. Carter tells Gomer it is the store's problem and to just leave the buggy where it is. Gomer goes to the store anyway. Gomer speaks to Miss Beckett (Jackie Joseph), who has been having a bad day. She gets Mr. Kendall (Marvin Kaplan), the assistant manager. Mr. Kendall says the buggy is used, but Gomer says he just wheeled it to the store. Gomer just gets sent from place to place and still cannot return the buggy. As Gomer leaves the store, he gets stopped by store detective Leonard (Cully Richards) as a shoplifter. Gomer tells a Mr. Wellman (Olan Soule) that the buggy was sent to him by mistake. After hearing Gomer's story, Leonard suggests he see a psychiatrist. Carter arrives, but he cannot convince Gomer to just leave the buggy. Gomer leaves the store with the buggy again. Leonard brings both Gomer and Carter back. While Carter and Gomer are speaking to Mr. Wellman, Carter starts to get very angry. Miss Beckett comes in. She admits that she made the mistake and sent the buggy to the wrong place. Because of a mistake Gomer makes, him and Carter get in trouble with Leonard again. Later, Mrs. Peale (Yvonne Lime), the woman who actually ordered the buggy, thanks Gomer for returning it. Mary Treen as Woman #1. Molly Dodd as Woman #2.
113	23	"Sergeant Iago"	Coby Ruskin	Rick Mittleman	February 16, 1968
Mr. Engelhart (Sam Edwards), Lou-Ann's boss at the record store, will be leaving town. They both have to work late doing inventory for new boss, Fred Hawkins (John Considine). Lou-Ann calls Gomer to cancel her date with him. She also tells Gomer she'll be busy for the rest of the week. Carter implies to Gomer that Lou-Ann gave him the brush off. Fred comes by the store, and as a "thank you" for working late, he offers to take Lou-Ann to dinner. Carter and Bunny see Lou-Ann and Fred come into the restaurant they're in. Bunny makes Carter promise that he won't tell Gomer. Carter eventually does tell Gomer, but Gomer doesn't believe it. Carter has Gomer go to the store to spy on Lou-Ann. Gomer sees Lou-Ann working with Mr. Engelhart and still thinks Carter was wrong. Carter takes Gomer to the same restaurant and there are Fred and Lou-Ann. Gomer is stunned. Gomer reluctantly goes on a double date with Carter, Hilda (Stacy King) and Debbie and Lou-Ann sees them. The next day Lou-Ann calls Gomer and Carter tells him what to say. Gomer feels bad. Carter and Gomer confront Fred and Lou-Ann at the restaurant. Fred explains what was going on and that he's married with children. Gomer feels better. Later, Carter needs Gomer's help because Bunny heard about his date with the other girls.
114	24	"Goodbye, Dolly"	Coby Ruskin	Ray Brenner & Barry E. Blitzer	February 23, 1968
Old Luke (Trevor Bardette) is at Bill's Diner. Luke tells Bill (Eddie Quillan) that he has to put away his old horse, Dolly. Gomer buys Dolly, to save her from the glue factory. Gomer tells Hummel about Dolly and they hide the horse. Hummel worries about how long they can hide Dolly. Carter discovers Gomer's locker full of apples that he was saving for Dolly. But Carter just thinks Gomer's hoarding food and yells at him. One night after Gomer feeds her, Dolly frees herself. Dolly winds up outside Gomer's barracks. Carter and Boyle catch Gomer with the horse. Gomer explains how he happens to have the horse. Carter tells him to get rid of Dolly immediately. The next morning, Dolly is still on base. Carter tells Gomer to take Dolly back to Luke. Gomer hides Dolly in a supply shed off base until he can find someone to take her. What Gomer didn't know is that the shed is to be blown up as a demonstration of a new explosive. Before Col. Gray can go on with the demonstration, Gomer runs to the shed. Gray tells Gomer to bring the horse back to Luke. On the way, Gomer runs into a man named Bud Frazer (Vaughn Taylor), who is outdoors painting a picture. Gomer convinces Bud to keep Dolly as Bud has a lot of land and could use a friend. Albert Popwell as Marine.
115	25	"The Price of Tomatoes"	Coby Ruskin	William Raynor & Myles Wilder	March 1, 1968
Col. Gray wants Carter to clear out the land in a secluded part of the camp for the testing of a new rocket launcher. Gomer knows how to drive a bulldozer, so Carter reluctantly gives him the job. Gomer runs into tomato farmer Titus Purcell (Denver Pyle) who says the land Gomer is bulldozing is his. Gomer knows about growing tomatoes. Gomer befriends Titus and goes to meet his wife, Maude (Claudia Bryar). Gomer tells Carter about Titus and Carter says that Titus is just a squatter. Gomer says that Titus is not the kind of man who would lie. Carter takes Gomer to see Titus, and Titus still claims it is his land. Things get very heated between Carter and Titus and Titus kicks them out. Gray sends out Lieutenant Caruthers, the base legal officer, to see Titus. Titus sends them away again. Gray now comes out with Caruthers. Titus is able to prove the land is his. Later, Titus comes to the base to see Gray. Titus is also able to prove that the base headquarters is on another tract of his land. Gray wants Caruthers to straighten things out, but Caruthers has no luck with Titus. Gray then sends Carter, because he was the first to rub Titus the wrong way, but that doesn't help. Gomer works out a deal with Titus. Titus will leave the headquarters alone if the Marines buy up his surplus tomatoes.
116	26	"Chef for a Day"	Coby Ruskin	William Raynor & Myles Wilder	March 8, 1968
Hacker loses a competition with Carter and gets Gomer for kitchen clean up duty for four days. Hacker is not looking forward to dealing with Gomer. Hacker explains to Gomer what he wants done and then leaves the kitchen. Col. Gray shows up and wants someone to fix him breakfast. Gomer gets stuck doing it. Hacker comes back and gets upset when he learns that Gomer made the breakfast. Gray tells Hacker and Gomer it was a great breakfast. Gray suggests that Gomer should be assigned to the kitchen permanently. Gomer's not sure he wants to leave his platoon. But Hacker now wants him and has to figure a way to get Gomer from Carter. Hacker pretends he wants to great rid of Gomer. He and Carter make a wager and Hacker "loses". Carter is thrilled to be rid of Gomer. Hacker informs Gomer he will be transferred to kitchen duty. Gomer says a sad goodbye to Carter and recalls some fond memories. Carter finds out that Hacker is using Gomer to make points with Gray. Carter wants Gomer back. Hacker tells Gomer that Carter lost him on a bet. A depressed Gomer starts making absent minded mistakes in the kitchen. Gray notices the meals aren't as good as they were. Hacker now wants to get rid of Gomer and Carter pretends he doesn't want Gomer. Carter throws the next wager to win Gomer back. Boyle tells Gomer that Carter wanted him back.
117	27	"Gomer and the Night Club Comic"	Coby Ruskin	Harvey Bullock & R.S. Allen	March 22, 1968
Jerry Ball (Jerry Van Dyke) is entertaining in a nightclub and everybody in the audience is completely ignoring him. Gomer is there and he's the only one enjoying Jerry's act. After Jerry's first set is done, Gomer goes back stage to talk to him. Jerry tells Gomer that the next set will be his last as he's been fired. Jerry says that ever since his partner left him, the act just hasn't been doing well. During the next set, Gomer gets the crowd worked up and they all sing along with Jerry. Mr. Randazzo (Anthony Caruso), the manager, sees this and is thrilled to see the crowd having a great time. Randazzo wants Jerry and Gomer to perform every night. Gomer says he's a Marine and couldn't be there every night. But, Gomer does get permission from Carter to switch guard duty the next evening. He tells Carter that he needs to help out a friend. Gomer and Jerry are performing and Carter and Boyle happen to walk into the club. The next day, Carter is furious with Gomer. Jerry comes by and gives Gomer some new songs he'd like to do. Gomer asks Carter if it would be OK to help Jerry a little longer. Carter forbids Gomer from singing in the club again. The next night, Jerry performs by himself, regains his confidence a little and has the crowd singing along. Afterwards, Gomer makes Jerry realize he doesn't need a partner. Something that Jerry says makes Carter feel better about the whole situation. Songs: Jerry sings Hello, Dolly! and "Hello Sunshine, Goodbye Rain". Jerry and Gomer sing "You Are My Sunshine".
118	28	"Love and Goulash"	Coby Ruskin	Ronny Pearlman	March 29, 1968
Gomer is going with his fellow Marine Leo Kovach to visit Leo's family. Gomer meets Mama (Lillian Adams) and Papa Kovach (Oscar Beregi). Leo tells Gomer that his sister Anna (Donna Loren) wants to marry another Hungarian boy named Paul. But because of an old feud between the families, Mama and Papa do not like him. Anna has been keeping to herself in her room. Leo takes Gomer to meet her. Anna and her parents have a fight at the dinner table. Gomer tries to ease the tension by telling a funny story, but it doesn't work. After everyone else is asleep, Gomer winds up meeting Paul when he secretly comes to see Anna. Mama wakes up and goes to look for Anna. Paul leaves and Anna makes it look as though her and Gomer couldn't sleep. Mama and Papa think Gomer would be perfect for Anna. Leo tells Gomer that Mama and Papa are trying to set him up with Anna. Leo suggests that Gomer go and talk with Paul's parents, Mama and Papa Szabo. Gomer learns that neither Mama and Papa Szabo nor Mama and Papa Kovach seem to know how the feud started. It takes quite a bit of doing, but Gomer gets the two sets of parents to give their blessing to the wedding. But there is a little bit of a problem when Anna and Paul want a small wedding and the parents want a large one. Otto Waldis as Mr. Zimmerman. Note: Frank Sutton doesn't appear in this episode.
119	29	"And Baby Makes Three"	Coby Ruskin	Harvey Bullock & R.S. Allen	April 5, 1968
Fellow Marine Howie Reilly (Chris Robinson) and his wife Nancy (Yvonne Lime) ask Gomer to babysit so they can go visit her sick mother in San Francisco. They will fly there and back all in the same day. Howie later calls and tells Gomer that they are fogged in. They will have to drive back and will be late. Gomer has to be back to the base by 5:30 am or he will be AWOL. Gomer calls Carter to tell him he'll be late. Gomer is sure Carter will understand. Carter insists Gomer is there at 5:30. Gomer sneaks the baby onto the base. Gomer tells a dozing Carter about the baby and thinks he has Carter's OK. The next morning Carter does see the baby and Gomer explains what happened. Howie calls and says the car broke down. Carter says the baby's got to go as Col. Gray is due for an inspection tour. Carter does let the baby stay for now. Carter tries to get something for the baby to eat from Hacker without him finding out about the kid. Hacker thinks Carter has an ulcer, but he eventually finds out about the baby. Gomer explains to Col. Gray about the baby and he understands. Gray tells Carter that Gomer's a good man. Carter gets into trouble with Gray when he tries to take some credit for the situation. Hacker gets in trouble with Gray as well. Later, Carter thinks Gomer has another baby, but it turns out to be a cat. Song: Gomer sings "Go Tell Aunt Rhody".
120	30	"Friendly Freddy, the Gentleman's Tailor"	Coby Ruskin	Rick Mittleman	April 12, 1968
Carter is to be an usher at a fancy wedding and he needs a dark blue suit. Boyle suggests that he rent one. It is payday and Carter tells the men to be wary of people trying to get their money. Gomer runs into Friendly Freddy. Carter comes by and tells Gomer to stay away from Freddy because he's a crook. Freddy tells Gomer he now sells "Hong Kong" suits. Later, Carter sees Gomer wearing a brand new dark blue suit and is very impressed with it and the price. When Carter hears Freddy sold Gomer the suit, he is hesitant, but he is also desperate. Carter buys the suit. Gomer shows off the suit to Lou-Ann and they both start sneezing uncontrollably. Lou-Ann figures out the cause is the suit. Gomer is now worried about Carter's suit. Lou-Ann suggests he have the suit dry-cleaned. The dry-cleaner store owner (Herbie Faye) asks if Gomer got a guarantee with the suit as it has shrunk. Gomer goes to the wedding to warn Carter about his suit, but it is too late. As Carter walks down the aisle with Bunny, the suit starts falling apart. Carter and Gomer confront Freddy, who comes up with an elaborate excuse and gives them each a new suit. But when Carter gets back, Bunny says the wedding is over. Gomer feels bad and offers to take them out to dinner. When the suits fall apart again during dinner, Gomer and Carter get their money back from Freddy. But, will Carter get talked into buying something else from Freddy? Note: This episode marks the final appearance of Corporal Boyle (Roy Stuart).

=== Season 5 (1968–69) ===
No. overall	No. in season	Title	Directed by	Written by	Original release date
121	1	"Car for Sale"	John Rich	Rick Mittleman	September 27, 1968
Carter is cleaning out his car before he sells it to Hacker (Allan Melvin). Carter tells Gomer some of the fond memories he had with the car. But, the car is costing him too much to run and the gas mileage is really bad. When Hacker doesn't have full amount of money for the car, Carter calls off the deal. Knowing Gomer is interested in the car and has enough money, Carter sells it to him. Hacker learns that Gomer bought the car. That night, Gomer tells Carter how well the car runs and he thanks Carter for selling it to him. Hacker plans to get even with Carter. Hacker keeps filling the gas tank to make it look as though the car is getting incredible gas mileage. Gomer tells Carter that he just made a small adjustment to the carburetor. Carter regrets selling the car. He makes up a sob story about Bunny and gets Gomer to sell it back to him. Gomer tells Hacker he sold the car back to Carter. Now Hacker siphons gas out of the car leaving Carter to think the car is getting horrible mileage. Carter tries to sell the car back to Gomer, but Gomer realizes he really didn't need it that much. Carter sells the car to Hacker for much less money than he was asking before. Hacker accidentally blows up the car. Victor Brandt as Cpl. Jensen.
122	2	"Corporal Duke"	John Rich	Bill Idelson & Harvey Miller	October 4, 1968
Carter informs the platoon that he will be away at a meeting for 4 days. A new Corporal will be temporarily in charge. Carter tells the men that the Corporal will be tough, so they won't have it easy. Carter is not happy when he finds out that Duke Slater (Ronnie Schell), who has just been promoted, will be the man. Carter says he'll get another Corporal. He remembers Duke as a slacker, but Duke insists he can do the job. Duke wants to make the Marines his career. Carter is hesitant, but he'll give Duke a chance. When the men find out that Duke will be in charge, they think they will have it soft. Duke tries to be strict and get the men to follow some commands, but they just laugh and stand around. Duke asks Gomer what the men think of him. Gomer repeats some of the disparaging remarks that they made and Duke gets upset. Duke gets rough with the men and overworks them. The next day the whole platoon, except Gomer, are in sick bay. A Lieutenant gives Duke some advice about the men and morale. Duke tells Gomer that apparently he's not the leader type. Gomer says that Duke just needs to be himself. Gomer rallies the men to show Duke some respect. Carter comes back and is impressed with how Duke ran the platoon. William Callaway as Dumbrowski. Renny Roker as Marine.
123	3	"The Booty Prize"	John Rich	Duke Vincent & Bruce Johnson	October 11, 1968
The 'Booty Prize' is an actual lead boot awarded every 6 months to a platoon to embarrass it for the mistakes they've made. Carter's platoon has won it 2 times in a row. If they win it again, they will be the first platoon in history to win it 3 times in a row. Carter does not want that to happen as winning it twice made Carter a laughing stock. Carter tells the men that Hacker's platoon is running a close second in mistakes for this 6 months. Because it is usually Gomer's fault for the mistakes made, Carter assigns him to shine the boot. While shining it, Gomer gets his foot stuck in the boot. Duke tries to help Gomer get it off. Despite Gomer and Duke's best efforts to hide it, Carter discovers the boot. With the help of the platoon, they get the boot off. Carter wants to prove that if one got the boot on, it should come off. Carter now gets his foot stuck in the boot. Because he doesn't want the platoon to know, Carter, Gomer and Duke try several different methods to get the boot off. They go to the metal shop to have it cut off, but the shop is closed. They then try to get the swelling down by having Carter sit in the mess hall freezer. They finally get it off, but Hacker finds out. Hacker plans to tell the Colonel what happened. Hacker then gets his foot stuck in the boot. Lieutenant Anderson finds Hacker in the freezer and now awards Hacker the boot for the next 6 months. Or will it wind up being a tie between the two platoons. Renny Roker as Marine.
124	4	"The Return of Monroe"	John Rich	Rick Mittleman	October 18, 1968
Because of a fortune cookie, Lou-Ann and Gomer have a little misunderstanding over commitment to each other. When Gomer brings Lou-Ann home, she gets a call from her old boyfriend, Monroe (Med Flory), who happens to be in town. Monroe asks her out, but she says she'll have to let him know. There's another issue when Gomer doesn't tell Lou-Ann she shouldn't see Monroe. Gomer comes by the record store to pick up Lou-Ann for a date. Monroe arrives and Lou-Ann goes out with him. Back at the base, Gomer is writing a letter to an advice column in the paper. Carter wants Gomer to tell him what the problem is. While Gomer tells Carter about his problem with Lou-Ann, Carter falls asleep. Monroe finds out from Lou-Ann that her and Gomer are not actually engaged or anything. The next day, Monroe lies to Gomer and tells him he is now engaged to Lou-Ann. Despite Gomer's objections, Carter sets him up with Natalie (Joyce Jameson). When Monroe shows up that night instead of Gomer, Lou-Ann calls Carter. Carter tells her that Gomer is out with another girl at the Paradise Club. Lou-Ann has Monroe take her to the same club. At the club, Natalie is trying to have a good time, but Gomer is just sitting there moping. Not knowing who she is, Natalie tells Lou-Ann that Gomer is pining for someone. Gomer finds out from Lou-Ann that Monroe lied about the engagement. After Gomer tells Monroe off, Gomer and Lou-Ann are back together. Upset that Gomer left with Lou-Ann, Natalie calls Carter and tells him off.
125	5	"Just Move Your Lips, Sergeant"	John Rich	Harvey Bullock & R.S. Allen	October 25, 1968
Duke tells Carter that John Fenton (Byron Morrow), producer of an upcoming Hollywood film, is looking for a Marine chorus to be in it. There will be a contest next Saturday night and any platoon may enter. The winner will spend three weeks in Hollywood. Carter wants to enter and with Gomer's help, he auditions the men. They get eight men. Gomer and Duke learn that Carter wants to be in the chorus as well. During rehearsal, the chorus sounds pretty good until Carter starts singing with them. Carter asks Duke how it sounded. Duke, afraid to name Carter, says one person was off. No one else wants to tell Carter he cannot sing. The group keeps trying to find places to practice without Carter, but he keeps finding them. Fenton arrives at the camp. Carter finds the chorus practicing in the mess hall freezer. It is not easy but Gomer finally tells Carter that he just cannot sing. Carter screams at Gomer and then loses his voice. The night of the contest Carter, whose voice is still gone, wishes the group good luck. Gomer and the guys want Carter to be part of the group so they tell him to "just move your lips, Sergeant". The group goes on to win. Songs: Jim Nabors and Frank Sutton with chorus sing "Drink, Drink, Drink", "Beautiful Dreamer" and "Heart of My Heart". Frank Sutton sings "Oh, You Beautiful Doll". Mark Evans sings "Oh My Darling, Clementine". Don Wyatt sings "Oh Genevieve". Paul White sings "Italian Song". Note: The plot of this episode is very similar to The Andy Griffith Show episode "Barney and the Choir".
126	6	"All You Need Is One Good Break"	John Rich	Jack Elinson & Norman Paul	November 8, 1968
After arriving in Hollywood, Carter and the men of the Marine chorus go to the movie studio. Carter has a confusing conversation with the Studio Guard (Paul Bryar). In the commissary, Carter tries to hit on every woman he sees, with no luck. Gomer meets stunt woman, Linda Farrell. Linda offers to show Gomer around town. Carter tags along and tries to hit on Linda. Carter doesn't think Linda could get him down with a Judo move, but she does. Later that evening, Carter tries to get Gomer to leave him and Linda alone. While Carter is talking to Gomer, two men accost Linda. She beats them up. The police arrive and one Policeman (Ken Lynch) believes it was Gomer and Carter that saved Linda. They try to say they had nothing to do with it, but the Policeman thinks they are being modest. The next morning the story makes it to the local newspaper. Gomer thinks they should tell someone the truth. Talk show host, David Farnum (George Fenneman), wants to interview Carter and Gomer. On the show, David starts by talking about the movie they will be in. Everytime Farnum asks Gomer a question, Carter interrupts and answers. David then asks them about the altercation the night before. Gomer admits that they did nothing and it was Linda that subdued the thugs. Hoping that the truth would come out, Gomer brought along Linda. David asks her to demonstrate what she did to the thugs on Carter. She takes down Carter again. Linda does thank Carter for some advice he gave her and Carter then starts bragging. The next day, Gomer tells Carter that a producer asked Linda to be in a movie as an actress. George Sawaya as Hoodlum #1. Fred Stromsoe as Hoodlum #2.
127	7	"A Marriage of Convenience"	John Rich	Harvey Bullock & R.S. Allen	November 15, 1968
Pola Prevost (Nita Talbot), a foreign movie star, will be deported soon as her Visa is about to expire. Harry Krasna (Jesse White), her manager, suggests she find someone to marry, so as to stay in the country. It would only be a marriage of convenience. Pola says it will be hard to find someone stupid enough to fall for that. Gomer asks Pola for her autograph and tells her how much he enjoys her work. Pola thinks she may have found her patsy. Meanwhile, Carter is trying to get a bleacher seat to watch the stars at a movie premiere that evening. Pola calls and invites Gomer to join her at the premiere. That night, while standing in the crowd, Carter is stunned when he sees Gomer arrive with Pola. After the premiere, Carter tries to get Gomer's attention but fails. Gomer joins Pola and Harry for drinks. Pola tells Gomer she loves him and talks marriage, but he says he already has a girlfriend. Carter shows up and Gomer introduces him to Pola and Harry. Gomer leaves and Pola now makes the move on Carter. Carter comes back to the hotel and tells Gomer he's engaged to Pola. Gomer asks him what about Bunny. The next morning, Carter and Pola make more plans. Gomer tells Duke that first Pola wanted to marry him and now she wants to marry Carter. Duke says that there's got to be a reason Pola wants to get married so fast. Gomer speaks to Pola and tells her how much Carter is looking forward to settling down and maybe raising a family. Carter learns from Harry that Pola went to Vegas with her interior decorator to get married. Gomer tells Carter it is for the best and has Bunny call Carter.
128	8	"A Star Is Not Born"	John Rich	Norman Paul & Jack Elinson	November 22, 1968
Carter has one line in the movie and he's been rehearsing it. He tells Gomer that he's all prepared. Carter and his men arrive at the movie set. Norman Miles (Sheldon Leonard), the director, notices that Carter has a mustache. Carter says he had the make-up man put it on so he would stand out. Norman tells him to get rid of it. Norman then sets up the scene for the men. Carter freezes when it is time to say his line. Carter continues to mess up his line in repeated takes. Norman wraps up for the day without getting the scene on film. He tells Chuck (Hamilton Camp), the Assistant Director, that he doesn't care who picked Carter to do the line, he wants someone else tomorrow. That night, Carter has a bad dream about the filming. The next morning, Carter wonders why he hasn't gotten his call from the studio yet. Gomer tells him he's sure they're just giving him extra time. At the studio, Norman tells Gomer he's to say the line instead of Carter. Gomer tries to tell Norman how much this means to Carter. Feeling bad that Carter is not in the film, Gomer gives a lackluster performance. Norman finds an important non-speaking part for Carter, and Gomer then gives a great performance. The next day Carter tells Gomer he's glad it is all over as acting is not for him. Something happens to make Carter feel a little better. Chanin Hale as Gloria. Tommy Farrell as Assistant Cameraman. Jamie Farr as Effects Man. Barry Williams as Boy #1. Songs: Jim Nabors with platoon sing "For He's a Jolly Good Fellow" and "Vive L'Amour".
129	9	"Come Blow Your Top"	John Rich	Jack Elinson & Norman Paul	November 29, 1968
Hacker tells Carter that he has no rapport with his men, which Carter disputes. Hacker also claims Carter's men are afraid of him because he loses his temper too often. The next day Carter asks his men if any of them have a problem they would like to discuss with him. Carter gets upset when no one speaks up. Later, Gomer comes to Carter and says he has a personal problem. That is why he didn't say anything when they were with the men. Gomer wonders whether he should bother to correct an under bite he has. Carter kicks him out because he thinks that's a stupid problem. Hacker sees this and then bets Carter $50 that Carter cannot go 24 hours without losing his temper. Hacker hopes that Gomer will annoy Carter enough to make him go over the edge. Carter does come close to losing it several times, but maintains his composure. But not being able to vent his anger is taking a physical toll on Carter. Col. Gray is inspecting the barracks and finds a dead chicken in Gomer's locker. They do not know that Hacker put it in there. Gray is not happy and lets Carter know. Carter drives out into the country to let off some steam. Hacker comes up with a plan to have Gomer break one of Carter's prized possessions. Carter still remains calm, but he does find out that Hacker was trying to sabotage him. With only minutes left to go, something Gomer does makes Carter start screaming and he winds up losing the bet. But Gomer finds a way for Carter to get his money back.
130	10	"A Little Chicken Soup Wouldn't Hurt"	Coby Ruskin	Aaron Ruben	December 6, 1968
While sitting in the park Gomer overhears a conversation between elderly Molly Gordon (Molly Picon) and her son Sol (David Ketchum). Sol thinks his mother should stop doing so much and take it easy. Sol leaves and Molly starts to talk to Gomer. She thinks he's too skinny and offers to make him lunch. At her house, Molly tells Gomer about how much she did for her son's family after her husband died. But now her son wants her to retire. Molly tells Gomer that Sol rents this large apartment for her. Gomer and Molly sing "Di Grine Kuzine" together. The next day, Molly comes by the camp and brings Gomer food. Gomer's worried about what Carter will think. Gomer introduces Molly to Carter and Duke and then shares the food with them. Carter loves the food, so when Molly invites them over for dinner, he accepts. When the men get to Molly's house, they run into Sol. He tells them that he doesn't want his mother working so hard and would they just go back. Gomer thinks Molly will be disappointed, but they leave. Gomer still feels bad about leaving without talking to Molly. Gomer goes back and asks Molly to go out to eat with him. She tells Gomer she has all the food ready to cook, but she agrees to go. At the restaurant, Molly shows the chef how to make to food better. Molly tells Gomer what a wonderful time she had. The next night Sol comes to his mother's house and sees Gomer and a whole bunch of men there for dinner. Gomer convinces Sol that his mother is happier this way. The next day, Molly tells Gomer and Carter that Sol wants her to move back in with his family. Roger Til as Waiter.
131	11	"Gomer, the Perfect M.P."	John Rich	Norman Paul & Jack Elinson	December 13, 1968
Gomer's platoon is assigned M.P. duty in town. Gomer tells the men he doesn't like being in a position of authority. Gomer keeps asking Carter about how he should perform his duties and Carter gets annoyed. Carter teams Gomer up with Ben Derzansky (Peter Duryea) and assigns them an area. Gomer tries to talk two Marines out of going into a bar, with no luck. When Gomer and Ben find a Marine out of uniform, instead of putting him on report, Gomer lets him go. Gomer then gets chewed out by Carter. Lieutenant Anderson catches the Marine that Gomer let go and Anderson then questions Carter and Gomer. Gomer continues to be lenient with other servicemen who do something wrong. Lieutenant Anderson finds out what Gomer did and Carter gets in trouble again. Carter puts Gomer on guard duty and orders him not to let anyone enter the base without identification, no exceptions. Carter has a couple hours off and goes to out to eat with Bunny. He realizes he doesn't have his wallet and he tries to talk Bunny into paying for the meal. When she says she has no money, Carter has to go back to the base to get his. Despite Carter's many attempts, Gomer refuses to let him pass without his ID. Gomer finally arrests Carter and brings him to Lieutenant Anderson. Anderson believes that Carter was just testing Gomer and commends the both of them. Carter still cannot get his wallet and Bunny takes a cab home. The next day while on M.P. duty, Gomer gets handcuffed to a little boy. Don Kennedy as Policeman. Renny Roker as Eddie.
132	12	"The Wild Bull Returns"	Coby Ruskin	Jack Elinson & Norman Paul	December 20, 1968
On his way to Washington, D.C., General Manuel Cortez (Larry Storch) returns to Camp Henderson for a visit. Cortez wants to go out for the evening with Carter. When they get together, Carter didn't know that Cortez also invited Gomer. When he finds out that Carter cancelled a date with Bunny, Cortez tells Carter to ask her along. At the club, Cortez constantly compliments Bunny and dances with her all night. Cortez pays the check in the currency of his country. The Maitre d' tells Carter it is not enough and Carter and Gomer have to pay the rest. The next day, Cortez tells Gomer that he's extending his visit and that he's in love with Bunny. Gomer tells him that Bunny is Carter's girl. When Cortez learns from Gomer that Bunny and Carter are not engaged, he decides to court her. Gomer tells Bunny about Cortez's intentions. Bunny decides to let Cortez court her to see what Carter does. Cortez spends the afternoon with Bunny and has Gomer as a chaperone. Cortez asks Bunny out for that evening. Cortez tells Gomer he will ask Bunny to marry him. That night, Gomer tells Bunny what Cortez is going to do and suggests that she discourages him. Bunny finds a way to get Cortez to change his mind about marriage. As Cortez is leaving, Carter shows up. Cortez tells Carter he can have Bunny. The next day, Gomer sees that Cortez has another woman already.
133	13	"Hit and Write"	Coby Ruskin	Bill Idelson & Harvey Miller	December 27, 1968
Carter hits a new car while parking and slightly scratches the fender. Gomer says it should only cost $10 to fix it. It takes some doing, but Gomer gets Carter to leave a note. Later, Carter gets a call from Harry Whipple (Al Lewis), the owner of the car. Harry claims there is extensive damage that will cost $235 to repair. Sensing a scam, Carter refuses to pay. Carter tells Gomer about the phone call. Harry comes by the camp and Carter says he's not falling for the scam. Harry shows Carter the badly damaged fender. Carter denies causing that damage and still refuses to pay. Gomer tells Harry what happened, but Harry thinks he's lying. Harry returns with his lawyer Mr. Goodbody (Arthur Peterson) and Mr. Marshall, his insurance agent. Gomer tells Goodbody and Col. Gray what happened. Gomer's testimony doesn't help and Gray insists Carter pay up. Gomer tells Carter he's sorry things turned out the way they did. Gomer goes to Harry's house hoping to talk to him. Harry's wife Alice (Kathleen Freeman) is there and turns Gomer away. Gomer witnesses Alice back the car into a tree a couple times. Alice admits to damaging the car, but she couldn't tell Harry. She's only been driving a couple days and all Harry does is scream at her. Gomer helps Alice tell Harry the truth and Harry starts screaming. Harry and Alice work things out.
134	14	"Two on the Bench"	Gary Nelson	Bill Idelson & Harvey Miller	January 3, 1969
Gomer sees a picture of Ellery "Moose" Lewis (Glen Ash) in the paper. Moose is now a football player, but Gomer knew him from back in Mayberry. Carter is having trouble finding a ticket for the big football game coming up. The game is sold out and Carter will have to pay extra. Gomer gets a call from Moose and goes to see him at the hotel. Moose invites Gomer to sit on the players bench during the game. Back at the base, Gomer tries to invite Carter to go to the game with him. But Carter is busy on the phone and brushes Gomer off. That night, Carter realizes what Gomer was trying to ask him. To make sure there is no misunderstanding about going to the game, Carter would like to meet Moose. The next day, they go to see Moose. But he got a slight concussion during practice and doesn't recognize Gomer. Carter doesn't believe Gomer knows Moose and buys a high priced ticket from Ziggy (Arthur Batanides). Moose comes by the base later and explains to Gomer about the concussion. He assures Carter and Gomer they have bench passes. Carter tells Ziggy he doesn't need his ticket. The day of the game, the Guard (Paul Bryar) says there's only a pass for Gomer. Gomer gives his pass to Carter, but the Guard still won't let Carter in. After Carter spends even more money for Ziggy's ticket, Gomer gets Carter his pass. At the start of the game, Carter gets hit by a tackle and is knocked out for the rest of the game. Afterwards, Moose gives Carter the game ball. Carter gets knocked out again when he tries to get the ball past the Guard. Jerry Hausner as Doc Barnes.
135	15	"A Tattoo for Gomer"	John Erman	Carl Kleinschmitt	January 10, 1969
While Carter is working out with weights, Gomer notices a tattoo on his arm. Carter tells Gomer that women love tattoos on men. That was one of the first things Bunny noticed about Carter. Gomer wonders if Lou-Ann would like a tattoo on him. Gomer asks Duke if he would get a tattoo, but Duke is not into them. As a practical joke, Gomer has Duke draw a girl tattoo on his arm. Duke is sure Lou-Ann will hate it. Gomer shows it to Lou-Ann and she thinks it is real. She doesn't like it, but doesn't say anything because it is already on his arm. Gomer tells Duke he's surprised the joke didn't work. Gomer doesn't want to get a real tattoo, but figures he has to because Lou-Ann likes it. Carter talks Gomer into getting the tattoo and takes him to the Tattoo Artist (Ned Glass). Gomer starts to get cold feet and decides he better check again with Lou-Ann. Lou-Ann still thinks his is real. She tells Gomer she likes it and wouldn't have a different one. Gomer heads back to the tattoo parlor. Duke is trying to find Gomer and calls Lou-Ann. Lou-Ann is crying. Duke finds out she hates the tattoo and he tells her it is not real. Lou-Ann gets to the tattoo parlor just in time to stop Gomer. At their next date, Gomer picks up Lou-Ann with a fake mustache as a joke. But then he cannot get it off.
136	16	"Win-A-Date"	John Erman	Norman Paul & Jack Elinson	January 17, 1969
Carter tells Duke that he is going to be a contestant on the TV show "Win A Date". Duke asks Carter how he's going to hide this from Bunny. Carter tells Bunny he didn't have a choice, he was ordered to go. Bunny is not happy about it. Carter asks Gomer to drive him to Hollywood. Once there, Carter brings Gomer into the studio. Gomer tells Carter that he's going to win for sure. Handsome Sgt. Cramer (John Considine), one of the other contestants, arrives. When the third Marine cannot make it, Gomer is chosen to take his place. When Carter insists, Gomer reluctantly agrees. Lou-Ann comes over to Bunny's place to watch the show. Bunny is not happy about Carter being on the show, but Lou-Ann says she should be more understanding. Beautiful starlet Wendy Sparks (Jeannine Riley) is the girl who the winner will date and take on a trip to Hawaii. Lou-Ann changes her tune when she sees Gomer is on the show. Wendy picks Gomer. Gomer tells James Barrett (Leonard Stone), the Producer, that he doesn't want to go on the trip with Wendy. And thinking that Bunny doesn't mind, Gomer talks Barrett into letting Carter go on the trip instead. Back at Bunny's place, Carter lies and tells her that he tried to lose. Gomer calls Carter and tells him that he's going on the trip instead. Carter tells Bunny that he has to go on a secret mission. Gomer tells Lou-Ann that he's not going on the trip. Things get complicated when Gomer finds out that Bunny didn't want Carter on the show. And there's a misunderstanding when Bunny sees a picture of Wendy, which was intended for Gomer, on Carter's desk.
137	17	"Marriage, Sgt. Carter Style"	Gary Nelson	R.S. Allen & Harvey Bullock	January 24, 1969
It is reenlistment time and Carter dreads Gomer signing up again. Carter tries to tell Gomer all the advantages of getting a civilian job. Carter tells him to think about it. When PFC Martin (Frank Alesia) tells Carter he won't be signing up again because he's getting married, Carter gets an idea. Carter starts his campaign to get Gomer to marry Lou-Ann. But Gomer keeps saying he's not sure he's ready to get married. And with Lou-Ann out of town for a few days, he cannot talk to her. Carter pays for a ring and a honeymoon. Carter then buys Gomer a new suit. Gomer doesn't feel right about Carter paying for and planning everything. Carter finds Gomer a house to lease. Gomer thinks Lou-Ann should have a say in where she lives. At first Bunny doesn't think Carter is doing the right thing, but then she gets drawn into the excitement. She picks out a few wedding dresses for Lou-Ann to choose from. Bunny arranges to have dinner for Gomer and Lou-Ann at her place and then Gomer can propose. Gomer shows up before Lou-Ann and tells Carter he's going to reenlist. Because of something Bunny said earlier, Gomer wants to give him and Lou-Ann more time. Gomer says that Carter should use all the things he bought to marry Bunny. The next day, Gomer tells Carter that he's officially reenlisted. Gomer tells Carter something else that makes Carter feel even worse. Don Diamond as Travel Agent. Bobo Lewis as Saleswoman.
138	18	"To Save a Life"	John Rich	Jack Elinson & Norman Paul	January 31, 1969
Carter saves Gomer from a live grenade that Gomer dropped during exercises. Gomer says that Carter just saved his life and he'll never forget it. Carter tells him to not make a big deal out of it. Gomer brings Carter breakfast in bed. He also took his uniforms and cleaned them. Gomer keeps annoying Carter by doing things for him, even though Carter tells him to stop. Gomer runs into Carter and Bunny at the movies and tells her what a brave thing Carter did. Gomer ruins Carter trying to get romantic with Bunny by sitting right next to them. The next day Carter tells Duke that Gomer is making him a nervous wreck. Carter figures that the only way Gomer will feel things are even would be to have Gomer save Carter's life. Carter's first two attempts fail. The third attempt almost fails as well, but Carter convinces Gomer that he saved his life. Carter tells Gomer they are now even. Everything is fine until Carter saves Gomer again. Renny Roker as Peters. Note: This episode's plot is basically identical to The Andy Griffith Show episode "Andy Saves Gomer".
139	19	"Dynamite Diner"	John Rich	Harvey Bullock & R.S. Allen	February 7, 1969
Gomer and Lou-Ann are walking by a cafe and decide to go inside. Inside, there is no one around and the place looks unused. Gomer calls out to see if anyone is in the back. Downstairs, Herb (Noam Pitlik) and Charlie are checking out the basement wall. On the other side of the wall is a bank vault which they want to break into. Herb tries to tell Gomer and Lou-Ann they are not open yet as they just rented the place that morning. But he winds up offering them some food. Gomer helps Herb cook the eggs and Herb gets excited. After eating, Gomer and Lou-Ann leave. But they decide to go back and help the men get the business going. Gomer used his own money to buy some more groceries. Charlie tries to get rid of them, but Gomer has brought in a customer. It is the Bank Guard (Ray Kellogg) from next door. Charlie finally gets everyone out of the store and puts up a closed sign. But Gomer comes back and starts cooking for customers, while Lou-Ann goes for more food. Charlie gets Gomer to come to the basement, hoping to tie him up. Something Gomer says gives Charlie an idea and he doesn't do anything to Gomer. Later, the place is full of customers and Charlie figures the crowd noise will drown out the dynamite blast. Gomer winds up flooding the basement, unknowingly stopping the dynamite. Herb and Charlie decide to go legit and run the cafe. Renny Roker as Marine #1. Note: Frank Sutton doesn't appear in this episode.
140	20	"Freddy's Friendly Computer"	John Rich	Bill Idelson & Harvey Miller	February 14, 1969
Gomer runs into Friendly Freddy, who is now running a computer dating service. Gomer mentions the dating service to Lou-Ann. Gomer tells her he thinks it is silly. She tells him to try it for fun, just to see what kind of girl it would pick for him. Gomer reluctantly agrees to do it. Gomer goes to see Freddy and give him his application. What Gomer doesn't know is that there is no computer. Freddy sets everyone up with Ellie Hofstetter (Maureen Arthur), a girl he has working for him. Gomer meets Ellie and she claims she's from a town not far from Mayberry. Gomer tells Lou-Ann about Ellie and some of the things they have in common. Lou-Ann does get a little jealous. Gomer doesn't want to see Ellie again, but Lou-Ann says he should just to make sure she is not Mrs. Right. Carter tells Gomer that anything that Freddy is involved in has to be phony. A suspicious Carter goes to see Freddy. Freddy sets Carter up with Ellie, who is now going by the name Babe Statton. Carter finds he has a lot in common with Babe. A problem arises for Freddy and Ellie when she has a date with Carter and Gomer on the same night. She has to bounce between the two men at the same restaurant. Things get worse when Duke shows up and apparently has also dated Ellie. Duke knows her as Magda. The men figure out that Freddy conned them. Later, Freddy tries to pull another scam on Gomer and Lou-Ann. Roger Til as Maitre d'. Note: This episode marks the final appearance of Lou-Ann (Elizabeth MacRae), and the fourth and final appearance of Sid Melton as Friendly Freddy.
141	21	"Gomer Maneuvers"	John Rich	Bill Idelson & Harvey Miller	February 21, 1969
Carter's and Hacker's platoons are to go on maneuvers against each other. The two make a $50 bet on who wins. Hacker tricks Gomer into giving the location of Carter's platoon under the guise of having to deliver food to them. Thanks to Duke, Gomer realizes what he did. The platoon has to move to a different location in the middle of the night. Carter yells at Gomer. The next day, Gomer tells Carter that he found Hacker's camp. Carter and the men raid the camp and find out it is full of girl scouts. Carter is furious and sends Gomer back to the base. While walking back, Gomer runs into Miss Beasterfeldt (Mabel Albertson) and the girl scouts, who are having car trouble. Gomer fixes their car. Miss Beasterfeldt tells Gomer that an Officer came and told her they were camping in a maneuvers area. They're moving the camp to a different location. A little later, Gomer is captured by Hacker. At first, Gomer refuses to give any information. Hacker tricks Gomer into going back to his platoon. On the way, Gomer stops at the girl scout's new camp. Hacker is following Gomer and thinking it is Carter's camp, he raids the girl scouts. Duke sees all of this and gets Carter to then capture Hacker's men. Back at the base, Hacker pays Carter the $50. But thanks to Gomer, Carter has to spend the money on girl scout cookies. Tom Lowell as Corporal Nelson. Lisa Gerritsen as Girl Scout. Note: This episode marks the final appearance of Allan Melvin as Sgt. Charley Hacker.
142	22	"Gomer Tends a Sick Cat"	John Rich	Duke Vincent & Bruce Johnson	February 28, 1969
Gomer learns that Carter went to sick bay with some indigestion. Duke tells Gomer that Carter had a Mexican dinner at Bunny's place. Bunny calls Carter and asks if the pain was his appendix. The doctor told Carter that if it where his appendix, he'd know it. Bunny tells Carter that her cat, Boots, is very sick. Bunny has to break their date for that night. Carter pretends he cares, but he really hates the cat. Later, Bunny calls Duke and wants to speak to Carter again. Gomer overhears the conversation and thinks it is Carter that's sick. When Duke goes to get Carter, Gomer talks to Bunny. Misunderstanding Bunny, Gomer is led to believe Carter may be dying. Gomer talks to Duke about it, but the misunderstanding continues. That night Carter is about to go play cards with some guys. He notices that the rear wheels of his car are missing. Gomer then proceeds to covertly do things to make Carter more comfortable. After speaking to Bunny again, Gomer leaves warm milk and a ball with a bell in Carter's office. Carter tells Duke that someone is playing games with him. Bunny calls Carter and tells him that Boots is getting better. Carter figures out that Gomer has been doing all the things to him. Carter wants to teach him a lesson and pretends he's dying. Gomer calls the hospital. It turns out it was a good thing Gomer called for a doctor, because Carter then has an appendicitis attack. Carter gets upset when he tries to thank Gomer, but Gomer keeps interrupting him. Note: This episode marks the final appearance of Carter's girlfriend Bunny (Barbara Stuart).
143	23	"I'm Always Chasing Gomers"	John Rich	Carl Kleinschmitt	March 7, 1969
Carter is on the verge of a nervous breakdown because of Gomer. He decides to visit his Mother (Kathleen Freeman) in Wichita, Kansas for a couple days. What makes it worse is that Gomer winds up driving Carter to the airport. Gomer helps Carter get his stuff onto the plane. Without Carter knowing it, Gomer hits his head, is knocked out and winds up stuck on the plane. When he comes to, Gomer doesn't want to spoil things for Carter, so he avoids him. After getting off the plane, Carter looks back and thinks he sees Gomer in one of the plane's windows. Gomer calls Duke from the airport and Duke tells him to ask Carter for the money to fly back. Duke reminds Gomer that if he doesn't get back, he'll be AWOL. Before leaving the airport, Carter thinks he sees Gomer. Gomer follows Carter to his mother's house, but hesitates to talk to him. After dinner, Carter again thinks he sees Gomer outside the house. Carter goes for a walk. Gomer talks to Mother and explains that he doesn't want to annoy Carter, but he needs money. Mother agrees to lend Gomer the money and insists he sleep in the attic. After Mother goes to sleep, Carter goes to look for something in the attic and thinks he sees Gomer. The next morning, Mother insists that Gomer have breakfast as Carter always sleeps late. As Gomer is leaving, Carter thinks he sees him outside. Before Carter can get outside, Gomer grabs a cab. When Carter gets back to the base, he tells Duke that he saw Gomer everywhere he looked. Carter's just as tense as when he left. Ottola Nesmith as Old Lady.
144	24	"The Short Voyage Home"	John Rich	Norman Paul & Jack Elinson	March 14, 1969
Gomer would like a one week pass, but Carter says no. Gomer says he would like to go back to Mayberry and buy a gas station with his cousin Goober. If all goes well, he'll leave the Marines to run the station. When Carter hears this, he changes his mind about the pass. Miss Paisley (Maudie Prickett), the bank teller, tries to talk Gomer out of withdrawing the money. Carter knows how gullible Gomer is, so he's worried about Gomer's $1,682. Carter goes with Gomer to the bus station. Sam Wiggins (Jay Novello) tries to talk Gomer into buying a chinchilla business. Carter puts a stop to that and accidentally mentions Gomer's money. An old lady (Ellen Corby) tries to pick Gomer's pocket, but doesn't succeed. Wanting another chance, the woman gets on the bus with her son, Chester. When a Plainclothes Man (Frank Gerstle) hauls Harry (Olan Soule), a crook, off the bus, Carter decides to go to Mayberry with Gomer. After Gomer almost loses his wallet with the money, Carter says he will hang on to it. The old lady proceeds to pick Carter's pocket. Later, Carter panics when he finds the wallet missing and figures out the old woman must have taken it. They go back to the last bus stop and catch the woman and her son. Gomer gets his money back. But after the Policeman (Don Kennedy) leaves with the two, Carter realizes his wallet is missing. Back at the base, Carter tells Duke how happy he is that Gomer's gone. Because of the way Carter protected him, Gomer decides to stay in the Marines. Joseph Mell as Taxi Driver. Ray Kellogg as Bus Driver. Elmer Modlin as Man #1.
145	25	"Proxy Papa"	John Rich	Harvey Bullock & R.S. Allen	March 21, 1969
Fellow Marine Ken Johnson's (Warren Berlinger) wife Rosemary (Jackie Joseph) is expecting a baby soon. Ken is a bundle of nerves. Back at base, Carter tells Ken he'll let him know if Rosemary calls. Gomer tells Carter that Rosemary would rather have Ken at the base. She cannot get any rest because Ken is just so nervous around the house. During the night, Gomer and Ken try to use Carter's phone and sneak it out of the barracks. Carter catches them. The next day, Carter gives Gomer and Ken the job of replacing insulators on the telephone poles. Gomer tells Carter that he fell off a pole and onto Ken. Ken wound up breaking his leg and will have to stay in the hospital. Gomer's worried because Ken won't be able to take care of Rosemary. That night, Carter's dresses in a tux for an important date with Bunny. Carter feels guilty because he should have had professionals do the telephone job. He drives Gomer over to check on Rosemary. Carter then does a practice run to the hospital with Gomer. Carter has a little bit of a confrontation with a doctor over which entrance to use. Back at Rosemary's house, Carter calls Bunny to tell her he'll be a little late. But then Rosemary says it is time and the three go to the hospital. Rosemary has a baby girl. Carter has to juggle phone calls between Bunny and Ken. Carter never does make it to his date with Bunny, but Gomer finds a way to patch things up between the two. Thordis Brandt as Nurse.
146	26	"Flower Power"	John Rich	Bill Idelson & Harvey Miller	March 28, 1969
Carter has an important exercise coming up and he doesn't want anyone screwing it up. That's why he gives Gomer the job of painting a Mobile Command van, that's in the woods, with camouflage paint. Carter tells Gomer to not go in the van as there is a lot of expensive radio equipment in it. While Gomer is painting, three hippies come up to him. Michele (Leigh French), Moondog (Rob Reiner) and Geordie ask Gomer what he's doing. Michele decides to call Gomer "Greensleeves". They wind up talking and having lunch together. The hippies offer to help Gomer paint. They will do one side, while Gomer does the other. They paint their side with bright psychedelic daisies and peace symbols. Gomer doesn't have time to repaint it as he needs to get back to the base. Later, Gomer, Carter and Duke come to look at the van, but it is gone. Carter is furious and asks if there were any other people around. Gomer tells him about the hippies. Carter has to go see Col. Gray and he tells Gomer to find the van. Gray tells Carter that he cannot make contact with the van. Gray says he must have got the wrong frequency, because he made contact with a civilian. Carter tries and realizes it is the hippies in the van. Meanwhile, Gomer finds the van. Gray wants to go with Carter to see the van, but when they get to the location, it is still not there. Gray learns that the other team had been at that area. He commends Carter for moving the van so it wouldn't be captured. Gomer drives up with the van. Gray then congratulates Carter for disguising the vehicle to look like a hippie van. Note: Gomer and the hippies sing the Bob Dylan classic "Blowin' in the Wind" in this episode.
147	27	"Hare Today, Gone Tomorrow"	John Rich	Rick Mittleman	April 4, 1969
Carter and the men come back from fighting a brush fire. Gomer brings a white rabbit back with him and Carter tells him to get rid of it. He winds up giving the rabbit to Danny, Col. Gray's visiting nephew. Gomer builds the rabbit, which is now named Harvey, a cage. Later, Duke and Carter find the cage and Carter lets Harvey out. Carter learns who the rabbit belongs to and tells Col. Gray that they will try and find it. Carter and Gomer trap a white rabbit, but Danny says it is not Harvey. Without telling them why, Carter has his men go out looking for the rabbit. The men catch many rabbits, but none are Harvey. Gray tells Carter how important it is to find the rabbit because Danny's father, a General, is excited for Danny to have this pet. Carter buys a large white stuffed toy rabbit, hoping Danny will be satisfied with it. Danny says it is not the same. Carter's men catch some more white rabbits. Danny tells Carter that Harvey had a little black spot on his front leg. Carter goes to a shop that sells rabbits and speaks to Harry Hostelman (Hal Smith). He buys a rabbit but Danny says the spot is on the wrong leg. Danny will be leaving later that day. Carter offers a reward for the rabbit. Carter then tries to fool Danny with a rabbit that has an ink spot on his leg, but it doesn't work. Gomer finally finds Harvey and gives Carter the credit. Later, Gray tells Carter that Harvey had babies. Frank Alesia as Marine #1. Note: Forrest Compton's final appearance as Col. Edward Gray.
148	28	"Showtime with Sgt. Carol"	John Rich	Aaron Ruben	April 18, 1969
Sgt. Carol Barnes (Carol Burnett) returns to Camp Henderson. She tells Gomer she's now in Special Services. She's in charge of putting on talent shows at Marine camps all over the country. She'll be doing a show at Camp Henderson and would like Gomer to sing. Carol speaks with Carter and when she mentions needing talent for her show, Carter thinks she's talking about him. Once Carol says she needs Gomer, Carter says no. He uses the excuse that they have an inspection coming up and they get into an argument. Against Carter's orders, Carol still brings Gomer to rehearsal. Carol doesn't tell Gomer what Carter said. Carter goes to the hall and forces Gomer out. What follows is a back and forth with Carol and Carter each putting Gomer where they want him. The show is this evening. Gomer finally suggests that instead of yelling at each other, Carol use her ladylike charm on Carter. Her ploy works and Carter lets Gomer perform. During the show, Carol and Gomer sing together. Songs Include: Music from Pagliacci, Row, Row, Row Your Boat, Frère Jacques, Kookaburra, Go Tell Aunt Rhody, The Bonnie Banks o' Loch Lomond, My Bonnie Lies over the Ocean, The Daring Young Man on the Flying Trapeze, The Whiffenpoof Song, Drink, Drink, Drink, Blow the Man Down, Drink to Me Only with Thine Eyes, Ochi Chyornye, Old Folks at Home, She'll Be Coming 'Round the Mountain, and Swing Low, Sweet Chariot.
149	29	"My Fair Sister"	John Rich	Jack Elinson & Norman Paul	April 25, 1969
Carter tells Duke that his sister Muriel (Reva Rose) is coming for a visit. Carter is hoping that Duke would take her to the company dance that evening. Duke tries to get Carter to describe what Muriel looks like. After Carter leaves, Gomer comes by to clean up the office. Duke finds a picture of Muriel in Carter's desk and he is not impressed. Duke then talks Gomer into taking her to the dance. Duke tells Carter he forgot he already had a date with Harriet. Carter is not happy about what Duke did. Gomer runs into Muriel and tells her he will be her escort to the dance. Meanwhile, Carter is trying to find someone besides Gomer for Muriel with no luck. Carter is concerned that Muriel is not married yet. He tells Muriel she might meet some nice men at the dance. Carter made an appointment with Madame Claudette (Jane Dulo) to give Muriel a make-over. Carter thinks Muriel looks great in the makeup, wig and dress that Claudette provided, but Muriel is not comfortable with it. That night, Gomer picks up Muriel and is surprised by her looks. Muriel is pleased when Gomer tells her he liked the way she looked before better. At the dance, Carter confronts Duke when he learns another guy was bringing Harriet. Carter is upset when he sees Muriel changed back and yells at Gomer. Gomer makes Carter realize that Muriel should be who she really is. Later, Carter gets a letter from Muriel saying she's dating a guy at work.
150	30	"Goodbye Camp Henderson, Hello Sergeant Carter"	John Rich	Aaron Ruben	May 2, 1969
Gomer tells Duke that he is painting Carter's office as a 5th year anniversary present. Carter shows up and is furious as he cannot stand the smell of paint. Gomer says he is sorry. Then Carter sits on a chair Gomer had just shellacked. Duke has to help Carter get out of the chair. The seat of Carter's pants tears off. Carter tells Gomer to get out of his life. Later, Duke tells Carter that a transfer came in to have Gomer sent to another base. Duke thinks that Carter put in the transfer, but Carter says this is the first he has heard about it. Carter is as happy as he could be and Duke asks him if he is sure he wants Gomer gone. Carter proceeds to recall the time Gomer messed up while on a Navy ship. Carter learns that it was Gomer that put in the request. Duke is surprised that Gomer would want to leave considering how he felt about Carter. Duke says how excited Gomer was about the fifth anniversary. Carter recalls the time Gomer was supposed to take care of Carter's car and it got destroyed. Duke reminds Carter that in each of those stories, Gomer made things right in the end. Gomer comes by and gives Carter a cherished good luck piece as a farewell present. Carter does not want to accept such a meaningful piece, but Gomer insists. Later, Gomer tells Carter that somehow his transfer was cancelled. Gomer says he had nothing to do with it and wonders if Carter could look into it. Duke realizes that it was Carter that did it. Note: This episode is a clip show incorporating scenes from two second season episodes, Gomer Captures a Submarine and Gomer Minds His Sergeant's Car. Seen in the archive footage are Tige Andrews as Chief Petty Officer, Ken Lynch as Patrolman, Ted Bessell as Frankie, Forrest Compton as Col. Edward Gray, and Brendon Boone as Sailor.
