= List of Gomer Pyle – USMC characters =

Gomer Pyle – USMC is an American television situation comedy originally broadcast from 1964 to 1969 on the CBS network. It focused on Gomer Pyle, a naïve but good-hearted private in the United States Marine Corps who served in a non-combat role while stationed stateside. The plots of the episodes often grew out of the contentious relationship between Pyle and his stern NCO Sergeant Carter.

== Main characters ==
=== Private First Class Gomer Pyle ===
- Portrayed by Jim Nabors

Ribbons of Decoration Worn By PFC Gomer Pyle

USMC Good Conduct National Defense Service

Private First Class Gomer Pyle is the main character throughout the series. Pyle also wears the USMC Expert Rifle badge.

=== Gunnery Sergeant Carter ===
- Portrayed by Frank Sutton

Gunnery sergeant Vincent J. Carter is Gomer's stern, yet soft at heart (as shown in "Cold Nose, Warm Heart" (season 3, episode 10)), drill instructor and later, his platoon sergeant. He was born on May 4, 1928, and raised in Wichita, Kansas, in a town not far from Leavenworth. Carter takes his role seriously, as evidenced by the stripes he's earned (and is sometimes obsessed with) over the years. Carter is exasperated by Gomer's ineptitude and refusal to surrender his naïve point of view and would like nothing better than to see Gomer transferred. He is referred to as "Sergeant Carter," although under actual U.S. Marine Corps protocol, he would be addressed as “Gunnery Sergeant Carter" or the informal "Gunny Carter". In the episode, "How to Succeed in Farming Without Really Trying," Carter specifies his correct rank.

There is inconsistency concerning Carter's age and time in the Marine Corps. At the beginning of the series, Carter had been in the Marine Corps for 16 years, meaning he would have entered service in 1948, when he would have been about 20. However, he wears the World War II Victory ribbon which was awarded to the Armed Forces through Dec. 31, 1946. In the episode "Old Man Carter" (season 1, episode 23), aired on 26 February 1965, he is said to be 35 years old. At the end of the show, Gomer discovers Carter subtracted incorrectly and was actually 36 years old, and not 35 as he believed. Carter also reveals to his men he joined the Marines in 1946. Therefore, his time in the service by 1965 would have been between 18 and 19 years. This would put him at the age of 18 when he joined. In the second episode he reveals that he has earned five Good Conduct medals, was cited for bravery in Korea and has had three honor platoons in a row. In "Come Blow Your Top" (Season 5, Episode 9), it is revealed Carter owns a sword from an enemy officer which he stated he captured at the Battle of Inchon (1950). At that time he was a corporal. (Later in that episode, though, he admits he won the sword in a card game while at Inchon.) In "A Tattoo for Gomer" (Season 5, Episode 15), Carter reveals he was with the 7th Fleet in Korea where he got his Semper Fidelis tattoo (upper right arm), but did not mention the year.

Carter wears his emotions on his sleeve. He has an explosive temper with a short fuse, which is triggered at the first sign of angst. This feature, in combination with Pyle's genial nature and naïveté, drives the show's plot in most episodes. Carter also expresses happiness and fear in dramatic fashion. His emotions also become a source of tension between him and his girlfriend, Miss Bunny Wilson. Despite Carter's desire to see Pyle out of his life, it is apparent he cares for Pyle and wants him to successfully fulfill his service in the Corps. Carter is Gomer's best friend, and by the end of the show's run, it is obvious that Gomer is his.

==== Awards, decorations, and service medals worn by Gunnery Sergeant Carter ====
Bronze Star Purple Heart US Navy Presidential Unit Citation Marine Corps Good Conduct World War II Victory Medal
National Defense Service Medal Korean Service Medal United Nations Service Medal Korea Korean Presidential Unit Citation
Carter also wears the USMC Expert Rifle and Pistol Expert badges

Frank Sutton in real life served in the US Army in the Pacific Theater of World War II. When he was cast as Sgt. Carter, he was allowed to wear some of his actual WW2 decorations with his Marine uniform.

== Recurring characters ==
=== Private First Class and later Corporal Gilbert 'Duke' Slater ===
- Portrayed by Ronnie Schell

Corporal Gilbert "Duke" Slater is Gomer's close friend in the Marines. Unlike Gomer, he has few scruples and is not above putting one over on Sergeant Carter, much to Gomer's consternation. A private in early seasons, Duke transferred to a different platoon at the end of season three (to allow Schell to star in Good Morning World), where he took a Corporal test and graduated in the top 10 of his class, earning a promotion to Corporal. Duke later returned to Camp Henderson (after Schell's series was cancelled) and succeeded Boyle as Carter's second in command. Duke is well-liked by the platoon and is known for his impressions. As he did before his promotion, Duke still addressed Gomer by his first name, sometimes calling him "Gome". He took over Cpl. Chuck Boyle's position for season 5 as the straight man putting up with Sergeant Carter's antics and sticking up for Gomer when actor Ronnie Schell returned to the series.

=== Corporal Chuck Boyle ===
- Portrayed by Roy Stuart

Corporal Chuck Boyle works under Sergeant Carter after Nicholas Cuccinelli. Boyle usually serves as Carter's conscience, making Carter treat Gomer civilly, even if it means that Gomer will continue under his beloved sergeant. Boyle is the straight man for Carter's antics and he also sticks up for Gomer a lot of times. Gomer never realizes it but Boyle, many times, serves as his advocate. Corporal Boyle left following the fourth season to be replaced by Cpl. Duke Slater (when actor Ronnie Schell returned to the series).

=== Lou-Ann Poovie ===
- Portrayed by Elizabeth MacRae

Lou-Ann Poovie is Gomer's girlfriend throughout most of the series. She is from North Carolina as well, and a sweet, somewhat naïve, but always willing partner to Gomer's misadventures, although she can also sometimes be fickle, capricious and prideful and can also get needlessly jealous and make incorrect assumptions when another woman makes a move on Gomer, even though Gomer makes clear he only has eyes for Lou-Ann. Although very interested in music (she came to California for a music career), she is considered tone-deaf. Her catchphrase is "Well...actually..." Lou-Ann Poovie was introduced and appeared in three episodes in the show's third season. She played Gomer's girlfriend in the show's fourth and fifth seasons. Lou-Ann is engaged to Monroe Efford, a beau from her hometown; however, she ultimately ends that relationship to date Gomer, despite Monroe's attempts to reconcile.

=== "Miss" Bunny Wilson ===
- Portrayed by Barbara Stuart

"Miss" Bunny Wilson is Sergeant Carter's girlfriend throughout most of the series. The couple regularly has disagreements, usually fueled by Carter's mishaps, but they clearly care deeply for each other, often making up by the end of the particular episode in which they fought. Whether formally, or casually, Bunny's attire is usually fashionable. She often takes up for Gomer when Carter is at odds with him.

=== Staff Sergeant Steve Whipple ===
- Portrayed by Buck Young

Staff Sergeant Whipple was born sometime in the 1920s or 1930s. Whipple and Carter dislike one another and are prone to competition, especially in platoon ratings. The season one episode "Private Ralph Skunk" highlights Carter and Whipple's rivalry and mutual contempt: When Whipple used underhanded tricks to embarrass Sgt. Carter just to keep his own recruit training platoon # 319 ahead of Carter's recruit training platoon # 318 in the ratings, Gomer (without Carter's knowledge) snuck his pet skunk inside Whipple's barracks to scare his troops outside, which got Whipple into trouble with the camp commander, who punished Whipple and his men by confining them to their barracks to clean up, much to Carter's delight.

=== Staff Sergeant Charley Hacker ===
- Portrayed by Allan Melvin

Staff Sergeant Charley Hacker runs company "B" mess hall and served in the battle of Iwo Jima; unlike his feud with Whipple, Sergeant Carter's rivalry with Hacker is less contemptuous, and on occasion the two are able to put aside their differences. One example was in the episode "Third Finger, Left Loaf", Hacker and Carter have to search 600 loaves of bread for a wedding ring Pyle believed he accidentally dropped into the dough (which was in Pyle's back pocket), nearly driving themselves crazy in the process. Hacker rarely calls Carter 'Carter' but usually calls him by his first name Vince.

==== Awards, Decorations and Service Medals Worn By Sgt. Hacker ====
Bronze Star Navy and Marine Corps Medal Purple Heart Marine Corps Good Conduct National Defense Service Medal Korean Service Medal United Nations Service Medal for Korea

=== Lieutenant Colonel Edward Gray ===
- Portrayed by Forrest Compton

Lieutenant Colonel Edward Gray was born in 1925. He was the officer in charge of the base on the show Gomer Pyle – USMC He served at the Battle of Iwo Jima during World War II in 1945. Gray, in contrast to Sgt. Carter, seems to respect Gomer more, especially on a personal level. Gray is portrayed as no-nonsense and running a tight ship. He rarely smiles and most scenes with Gray are in his office as he sits behind his desk chewing out Sgt. Carter. A recurring theme depicts Gray giving Carter an important responsibility to carry out, only to have Pyle frustrate the assignment, placing Carter in an awkward position with Gray.

==== (Incomplete list) Awards, Decorations and Service Medals Worn By Lieutenant Colonel Edward Gray ====
Silver Star Navy and Marine Corps Medal Purple Heart US Navy Presidential Unit Citation Marine Corps Good Conduct World War II Victory Medal

=== Lieutenant Colonel George Van Pelt ===
- Portrayed by Peter Hansen

Lieutenant Colonel George Van Pelt was born in 1911. He joined the U.S. Marine Corps and saw action in World War II against Japan. He was in the first season of Gomer Pyle – USMC

=== Corporal and Gunnery Sergeant Carol Barnes ===
- Portrayed by Carol Burnett

Corporal, then Gunnery Sergeant Carol Barnes was in an episode in Gomer Pyle – USMC of season 4 entitled "Corporal Carol", during which she falls in love with Gomer but then finds out that he is dating someone else.

She also appears in an episode of season 5 entitled "Show Time with Sgt. Carol", in which Gomer and Carol sing a Duet at Camp Henderson's Base Variety Show.

=== Corporal Johnson ===
- Portrayed by Jerry Dexter

Corporal Johnson was born in 1944 and worked with Gunnery Sergeant Vince Carter during the first season of the show.

=== Corporal Jensen ===
- Portrayed by Victor Brandt

Corporal Jensen is Sergeant Hacker's second-in-command.

=== Corporal Nicholas Cuccinelli ===
- Portrayed by Tommy Leonetti

Corporal Nicholas Cuccinelli was born in 1939. He served under Gunnery Sergeant Vince Carter in the first season in 1964 - 1965.

=== Private First Class Frankie Lombardi ===
- Portrayed by Ted Bessell

Private Frankie Lombardi was introduced in season 2. He served as a recruit under Sergeant Carter. He is partner-in-crime and best friend to private Duke Slater and a constant confidant to Gomer.

=== Private Joey Lombardi ===
- Portrayed by Joe E. Tata, George Spencer, and George Zateslo

Private Joey Lombardi is the brother of Private Frankie Lombardi. Lombardi was a recruit under Gunnery Sergeant Vince Carter. He was in eleven episodes of Gomer Pyle, U.S.M.C. and was portrayed by three actors. He had a girlfriend named Rosie, whom Gomer snuck in to base to see him, although the rules strictly prohibited visitation until after four weeks of training. Though Joey confessed that she was his girlfriend, Gomer was still punished by Gunnery Sgt. Carter for sneaking Rosie in without permission.

=== Private First Class Lester Hummel ===
- Portrayed by William Christopher

Another of Gomer's friends. Usually a philosopher-like type of Marine. He is the most seen from seasons 3-4 next to Duke Slater.

=== Private Eddie Swanson ===
- Portrayed by Mark Slade

Another of Gomer's friends. He, Gomer, Duke, et al. were in boot camp together. He only appears in the first half of season 1.

=== Private Larry Gottschalk ===
- Portrayed by Larry Hovis

One of Gomer's barracks mates, also an occasional foil to Duke Slater.

Appears only in season 1 (1964–1965); actor Larry Hovis left the series to appear as Lieutenant Carter in the pilot episode of Hogan's Heroes, oddly enough, that role would be revamped, and made regular, as their own Sgt. Carter.

=== Senior Chief Petty Officer Wayne Simpson ===
- Portrayed by Tige Andrews

Sgt. Carter's Navy foe; a bully to some Marines. His catchphrase is "What's this? What's this?". Simpson once knocked Carter out during a boxing match with one punch, and makes fun of the platoon when Gomer messes up. Nicknamed "The Rattlesnake", he was the Fleet boxing champion for four years: 37 KOs and only retired from the said position because he couldn't find someone brave enough to challenge him. Simpson also has his own gang of men following him around. In "Cat Overboard", Carter and the other Marines laughed at Simpson when they learned about the romance magazines he reads aboard ship. He got offended and told Carter off that his choice of reading romance magazines are none of his and the Marines' business. Simpson has a strict rule on contraband, evident when he threw a pet turtle over board and confiscated a transistor radio. Although angry that Gomer had snuck his pet cat, Henrietta, aboard ship, Simpson has shown compassion when he learned about her pregnancy and took her to the sick bay so some of his corpsmen can have some training in delivering kittens.
