= Vince Carter (disambiguation) =

Vince Carter (born 1977) is an American former professional basketball player.

Vince Carter may also refer to:

== People ==
- Vincent Carter (1891–1972), U.S. Representative from Wyoming

== Fictional characters ==
- Vince Carter (Gomer Pyle), U.S. Marine
- Vince Carter (The Secret World of Alex Mack), security chief
