= Sergeant Carter =

Sergeant Carter may refer to two television characters:

- Gunnery Sergeant Vince Carter, from Gomer Pyle, U.S.M.C.
- Technical Sergeant Andrew Carter, from Hogan's Heroes
