= Gomer Pyle =

Fictional character from The Andy Griffith Show and Gomer Pyle

- The Andy Griffith Show character
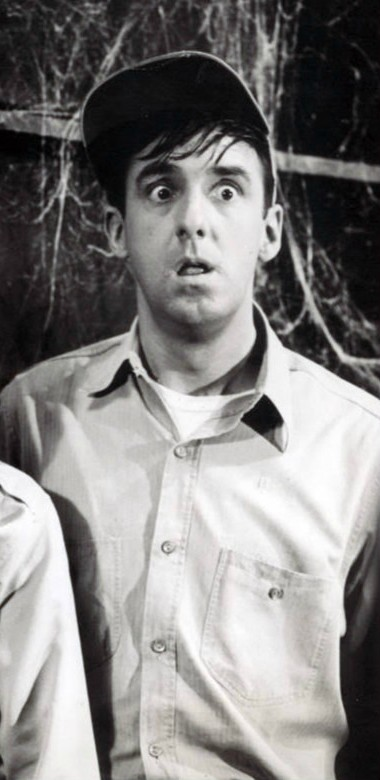
- Jim Nabors as Gomer Pyle
- First appearance: "The Bank Job"; The Andy Griffith Show; December 24, 1962
- Last appearance: Return to Mayberry; April 13, 1986
- Portrayed by: Jim Nabors

In-universe information
- Occupation: Auto mechanic, US marine
- Relatives: Goober Pyle (cousin); Braden Pyle (cousin)

Gomer Pyle is a fictional character played by Jim Nabors and introduced in the middle of the third season of The Andy Griffith Show.

A naive and gentle auto mechanic, he became a recurring character with the January 1963 episode "Man in a Hurry". Nabors played Pyle for 23 episodes, from 1962 to 1964.

After two seasons on The Andy Griffith Show, the character was spun off to Gomer Pyle, U.S.M.C. in 1964, which ran until 1969.

== Character ==
Gomer is a naïve, extremely moral auto mechanic turned United States Marine Corps private, from Mayberry, North Carolina. The only apparent employee at Wally's Filling Station, he initially lived there in a back room, and according to Andy, was "saving up for college" and wanted to be a doctor. Wide-eyed and slack-jawed, he usually wore a service-station uniform and a baseball cap with an upturned bill; a handkerchief dangled from his back pocket. He initially displayed scant knowledge of automotive mechanics; in "The Great Filling Station Robbery", for example, he thought a carburetor was a hood ornament. In the same episode, he admitted all he knew how to do was fill cars with gas, oil, water, and air, but he learned over time. In other episodes, he was able to diagnose mechanical problems for the average layperson. In his first appearance, the episode "The Bank Job", Gomer is shown operating a blow torch to cut through a bank's vault. In another episode, Gomer diagnoses a problem with a car belonging to an out-of-town visitor who is delayed by a mechanical breakdown. In "Barney's First Car", Andy calls Gomer to tow Barney's disabled car, implying that Gomer knows how to operate Wally's tow truck. In "Gomer the House Guest", Wally fires Gomer, causing Gomer to move in with Andy. Wally's former customers then bring their cars to Andy's house so Gomer can diagnose mechanical problems and repair them. Realizing the success of his business depends on Gomer, Wally rehires him.

Like his cousin Goober, Gomer provided comic relief, awestruck by the simplest of things, resulting in the exclamation of his catchphrases, "Shazam!", "Golly", "Sur-prise, sur-prise, sur-prise!", and "shame, shame, shame!", as appropriate.

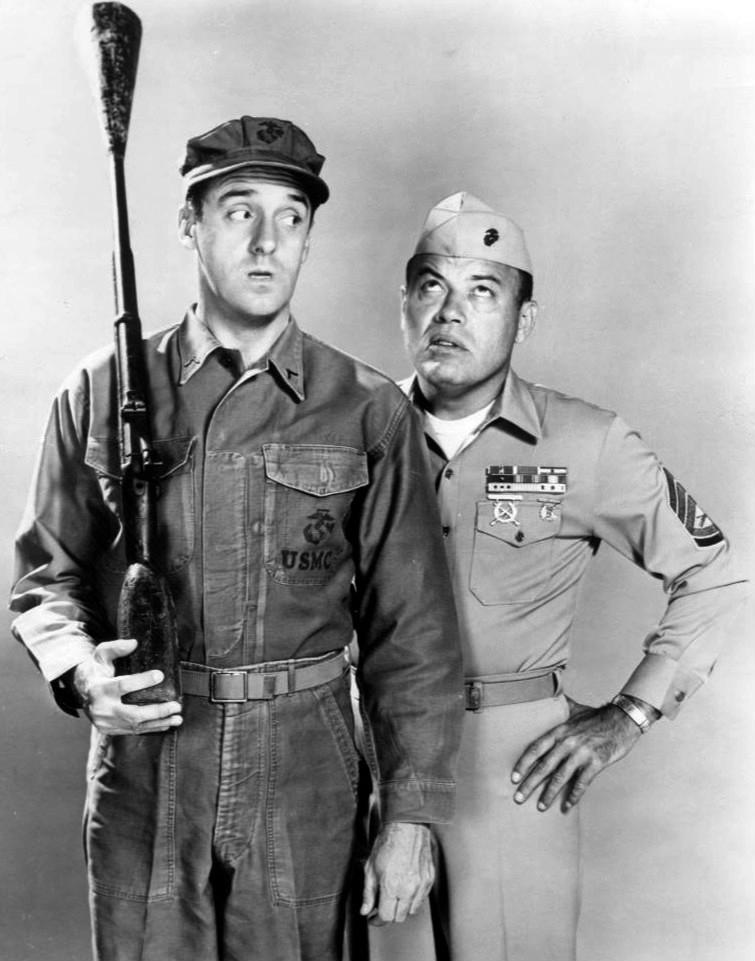
Gomer as a new recruit under Sergeant Carter's evaluation

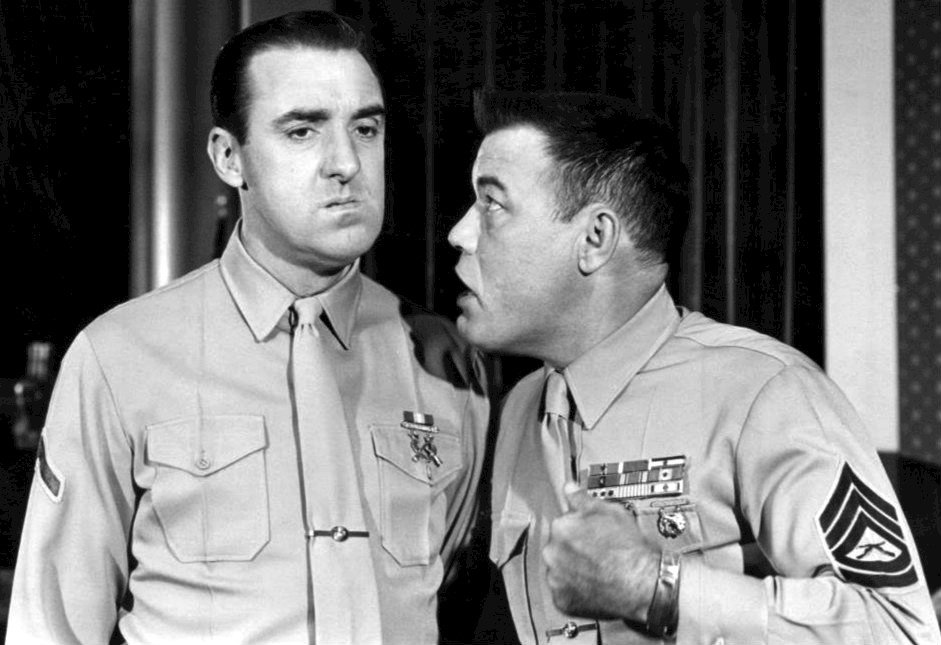
Carter takes issue with Pyle.

Gomer was sometimes deputized by Deputy Barney Fife, when Sheriff Taylor was otherwise occupied. Though always compliant, Gomer's ineptitude usually made him more of a hindrance than a help in the line of duty. In the eyes of his friends, though, especially Sheriff Andy Taylor, his shortcomings were generally outweighed by his gentle, generous spirit.

In the last episode of the fourth season, Gomer tells Andy he has joined the Marines, because he realized he would eventually be drafted into military service.

Gomer's Mayberry roots were evident in the spin-off series Gomer Pyle, U.S.M.C., where his countrified, backward nature served as the mainstay for the show's humor, making him a comic foil to the hard-nosed drill instructor (later platoon sergeant) Gunnery Sergeant Vince Carter, played by Frank Sutton. Both series also included several episodes displaying Gomer's skill as a baritone singer. This skill ultimately takes Gomer to Washington, DC, along with Sgt. Carter, in the 1967 episode "The Show Must Go On", in which Gomer, backed by the Marine Corps Band, performs for an audience that includes the President. In a season 3 episode, it is revealed that Pyle runs fast and admits that in Mayberry he was a volunteer fireman who ran a mile in “four to five minutes” in order to catch the fire truck so he could ring the bell. In the season 3 episode "Whither the Weather", Gomer reveals he can accurately predict the weather due to a corn on his foot, triggered when he stomps the foot.

At first, Sergeant Carter was rankled and extremely irritated by the slow-witted Pyle, and dreamed of ways to rid himself of the private's presence. Over the course of the series, however, Carter began to tolerate Pyle, and even grew to respect him. Pyle, though always unconventional, developed into a good Marine, yet never went an episode without causing some degree of irritation for Carter. In the 1967 episode "Gomer the Welsh Rarebit Fiend", Gomer's appetite for welsh rarebit induces sleepwalking, during which Gomer derides and berates Sgt. Carter in a reversal of roles. In the final episode, Gomer requests a transfer after realizing he is nothing but a source of constant anxiety for Carter. Carter, initially pleased with the request, later arranges for the transfer to be denied, and the episode ends with Carter insisting the two shake hands, not knowing Gomer's hand is covered in shellac.

Gomer's dating life begins on The Andy Griffith Show in the December, 1963 episode "A Date for Gomer", when he agrees to take Thelma Lou's cousin, Mary Grace, to a town dance. As a Marine, Gomer's romantic interest is Lou Ann Poovie, a fellow North Carolinian who came to California for a singing career, although she proves to be tone deaf. Like Gomer, Lou Ann is innocent and naive, and is a willing participant in many of Gomer's misadventures.

Both The Andy Griffith Show and Gomer Pyle, U.S.M.C. ended their runs by the late 1960s. While Mayberry R.F.D. continued from 1968 to 1971, where The Andy Griffith Show left off, the concept of returning Gomer to Mayberry was nixed, as the actor was given a CBS variety show of his own (The Jim Nabors Hour, which lasted two seasons). Gomer eventually returned, along with most of the original cast of The Andy Griffith Show, to the 1986 television movie Return to Mayberry. Gomer and Goober Pyle run a gas station/car repair shop called G & G Garage, implying that Gomer's Marine career had, at some point, ended.

Jim Nabors briefly parodied his role in Cannonball Run II, playing a character named Homer Lyle.

On an episode of The Lucy Show, "Lucy Gets Caught Up in the Draft", Nabors has a cameo role as Gomer Pyle.

When both The Carol Burnett Show and Gomer Pyle, U.S.M.C. were running on CBS first run, an annual crossover aired between the series – with a character played by Burnett appearing on Gomer Pyle, U.S.M.C., and Nabors appearing on Burnett's variety show on the first episode of every season.

== The Andy Griffith Show appearances ==
The following is a list of The Andy Griffith Show episodes featuring Gomer before his spinoff series:

=== Season 3 ===
- Episode 13: "The Bank Job"
- Episode 16: "Man in a Hurry"
- Episode 17: "High Noon in Mayberry"
- Episode 22: "The Great Filling Station Robbery"
- Episode 27: "Barney's First Car"
- Episode 32: "The Big House"

=== Season 4 ===
- Episode 2: "The Haunted House"
- Episode 4: "The Sermon for Today"
- Episode 6: "Gomer the House Guest"
- Episode 7: "A Black Day for Mayberry"
- Episode 9: "A Date for Gomer"
- Episode 11: "Citizen's Arrest"
- Episode 13: "Barney and the Cave Rescue"
- Episode 20: "The Song Festers"*
- Episode 22: "Andy's Vacation"
- Episode 23: "Andy Saves Gomer"
- Episode 24: "Bargain Day"
- Episode 26: "A Deal is a Deal"
- Episode 27: "Fun Girls"
- Episode 29: "The Rumor"
- Episode 30: "Barney and Thelma Lou, Phfftt"
- Episode 31: "Back to Nature"
- Episode 32: "Gomer Pyle, U.S.M.C."

== Cultural impact ==
The term "gomer" has entered the English lexicon, usually meaning "stupid person" or "fool," especially if a coworker or trainee. During the Vietnam War, it was used to refer to Vietnamese soldiers. The OED attributes the "stupid person" meaning to Gomer Pyle, though scholars note that "gomerel" meant "fool" in English dialects outside the United States long before Gomer Pyle appeared on television.

San Antonio has a street named Gomer Pyle Drive.

== Cultural references ==
- In the novel The Short-Timers by Gustav Hasford, the character Leonard Pratt is derisively nicknamed "Gomer Pyle" by Gunnery Sergeant Gerheim.
- In the film Full Metal Jacket by Stanley Kubrick, the nickname "Gomer Pyle" is derisively given to Private Leonard Lawrence (played by Vincent D'Onofrio) during boot camp, due to Gunnery Sergeant Hartman (played by R. Lee Ermey) objecting to his real name.
- "Gomer Pyle" has become U.S.M.C. slang for a recruit who continually messes up or needs extra training.
- In the 1992 film White Men Can't Jump, Billy Hoyle (played by Woody Harrelson) refers to a rival basketball player as "Gomer Pyle" after being called "Opie Taylor".
- In the cartoon TV series Futurama episode "Roswell That Ends Well", Fry meets someone he believes to be his grandfather whose character is based on Gomer Pyle.
- In the film Evan Almighty, Evan Baxter references Gomer Pyle when he buys the eight lots next to his house in Washington, DC, and tries to explain it to his wife by doing the voice and saying, "Surprise, surprise, surprise!".
- In the 2007 horror film The Hills Have Eyes 2, the character David Napoli, part of a trainee squad, is referred to as "Gomer Pyle" by his superior.
- On Pink Floyd's The Wall album (1979), on track 16 titled "Nobody Home", a television can be heard in the background. At just over the 3:00 mark, the voice of Gomer Pyle can be heard saying "Surprise, surprise, surprise!".
- In the film Forrest Gump (1994), the title character is watching Gomer Pyle on television at a VA hospital, when Dallas, one of Gump's fellow soldiers in the Vietnam War, asks Gump how he can watch such a stupid show.
- In the cartoon TV series The Simpsons episode "Monty Can't Buy Me Love", power-plant owner Mr. Burns refers to Gomer Pyle's "heavenly" singing voice as the "Eighth Wonder of the World". In another episode, "Mad About the Toy", Grampa Simpson says, "Sorry, my friend, this Army man is as straight as Gomer Pyle".
- In the cartoon TV series Pinky and the Brain episode "Plan Brain from Outer Space", the mice encounter Gomer Pyle manning the gate at Area 51.
- In the film Good Morning Vietnam, Robin Williams plays a disc jockey (DJ) in Saigon during the Vietnam War and apparently receives a call-in on his radio show by an individual sounding like Gomer Pyle. Williams responds by naming the caller as Gomer (no last name) and asking him what he is doing in 'Nam, to which the caller responds with Gomer Pyle's catchphrase, "Well, surprise, surprise, surprise!" All voices are, of course, by Robin Williams as DJ Adrian Cronauer.
- Punk band Total Chaos has a song titled "Gomer Pyle" on their 1994 album Pledge of Defiance.
