= Peter Puck =

Animated cartoon character teaching the rules of ice hockey

Peter Puck

Peter Puck is a hockey puck-shaped cartoon character. The puck, whose animated adventures appeared on both NBC's Hockey Game of the Week and CBC's Hockey Night in Canada during the 1970s, explained ice hockey rules, equipment and the sport's history to the home viewing audience. The voice of Peter Puck was provided by Ronnie Schell. The animation was produced by Hanna-Barbera studios. Nine episodes, each approximately three minutes long, were broadcast between periods of NHL hockey games.

== Origins ==
The brainchild of NBC executive and New York Rangers season ticket holder Donald Carswell, who conceived the idea and scripted first drafts of the initial episodes, Peter Puck was developed for the television network in partnership with Hanna-Barbera. Designed to help introduce and popularize ice hockey among non-fans (especially children), Peter Puck became an instant and enduring hit with existing hockey fans. When the network stopped carrying NHL games in 1975, NBC sold Peter's rights back to Hanna-Barbera, which later sold them to Brian McFarlane, a member of the network's NHL broadcast team (and the son of Leslie McFarlane, also known as first of many to assume the pen name "Franklin W. Dixon" and pen the Hardy Boys books). McFarlane subsequently wrote three children's books using the character: Peter Puck: Love That Hockey Game (1975), Peter Puck and the Stolen Stanley Cup (1980), and Peter Puck's Greatest Moments in Hockey (1980).

== Comeback ==
Peter Puck made a comeback during the 2007 NHL Playoffs, as retailers began selling a line of retro apparel with the Peter Puck logo. That same year, Peace Arch Entertainment released the entire series to DVD.

Since December 2007, the original Peter Puck has been shown during the first intermission of Toronto Maple Leafs games broadcast on Leafs TV. The clips are seen in their original form, with outdated rules and references omitted.

For the 2009–10 NHL season, Peter Puck returned to the CBC.

In August 2023, it was announced a new animated series is in production. The series will feature Peter Puck's sister Penny Puck.
