= Julie Parrish =

American actress (1940–2003)

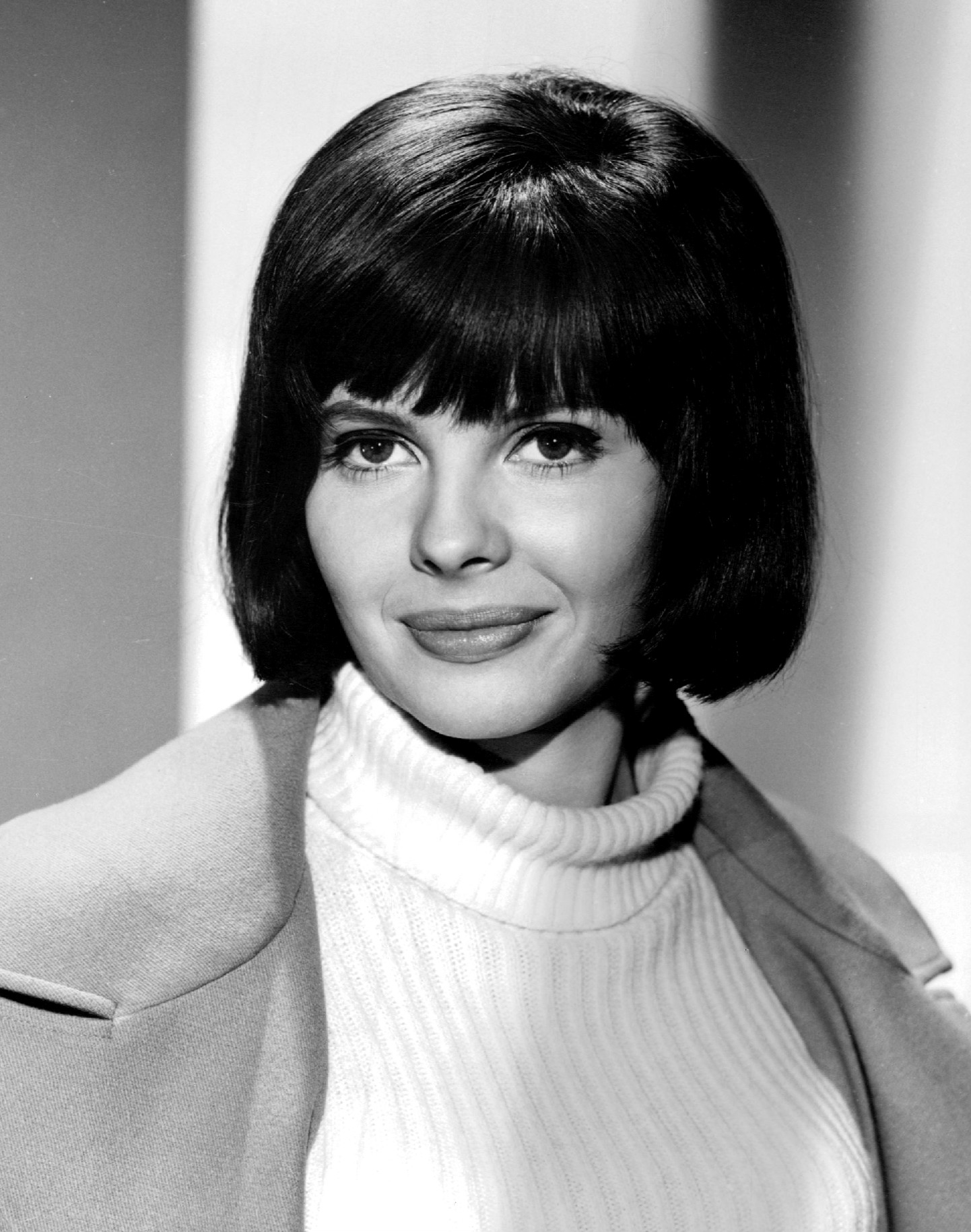
- Parrish in Good Morning World (1967)
- Born: Ruby Joyce Wilbar; October 21, 1940; Middlesboro, Kentucky, U.S.
- Died: October 1, 2003 (aged 62); Los Angeles, California, U.S.
- Occupation: Actress
- Years active: 1962–1998
- Known for: Paradise, Hawaiian Style; Fireball 500; Return to Peyton Place; The Menagerie; Good Morning World

Julie Parrish (born Ruby Joyce Wilbar; October 21, 1940 – October 1, 2003) was an American actress.

== Early life ==
Parrish was born Ruby Joyce Wilbar on October 21, 1940, in Middlesboro, Kentucky, to William Robert "Bob" Wilbar and Gladys Wilbar (née Gladys Marie Webb). She had five younger siblings, sisters Barbara, Janice, and Liza, and brothers James and Robert. Julie was of English descent. After graduating from high school in Tecumseh, Michigan she began attending the Patricia Stevens Modeling School, and studied at the University of Toledo.

== Career ==
Parrish first appeared as an actress in the Jerry Lewis movies It's Only Money (1962) and The Nutty Professor (1963), and in a small role in Harlow (1965). After some guest appearances on television series, and roles in films such as Winter A-Go-Go (1965) and Fireball 500 (1966), she co-starred with Elvis Presley in Paradise, Hawaiian Style (1966). Her later film credits included roles in The Doberman Gang (1972) and The Devil and Max Devlin (1981), as well TV movies such as The Time Machine (1978) and The Last Fling (1987).

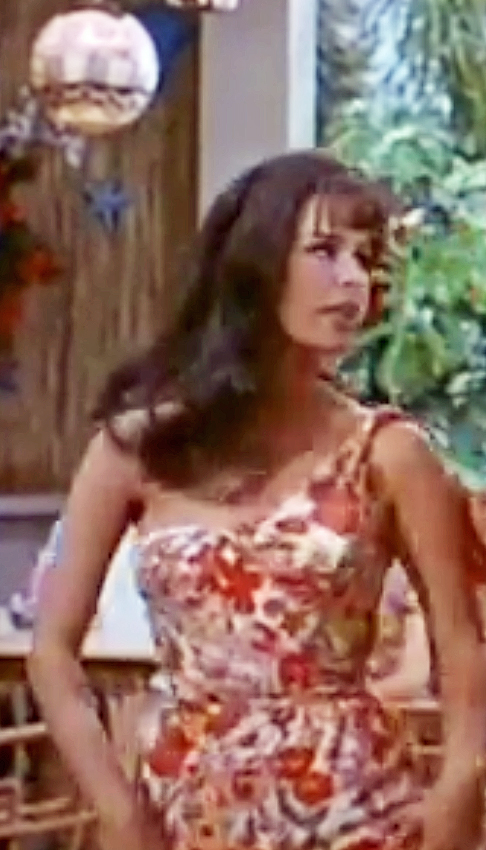
Parrish in the trailer for Paradise, Hawaiian Style 1966

Parrish also made guest appearances in many television series such as Death Valley Days, Gunsmoke (“The Warden” in 1964), My Three Sons, Family Affair, Star Trek, Bonanza, Murder, She Wrote, Capitol and Beverly Hills, 90210. She had lead roles on several television soap operas and was the female lead in the short-lived 1967 CBS Television sitcom, Good Morning World.

Parrish's theater credits include Absence of a Cello and Memo. In Los Angeles, she received an L.A. Drama Critics Award for her portrayal of Maggie in Arthur Miller's After the Fall.

== Education ==
Parrish later earned an undergraduate degree in Chemical Dependencies Counseling, and worked at the Haven Hills Shelter for Battered Women.

== Death ==
After a 10-year battle with ovarian cancer, she died of complications from the disease in Los Angeles, California, at the age of 62, on October 1, 2003.

== Filmography ==
Year	Title	Role	Notes
1962	It's Only Money	Bridalshop Saleslady	Uncredited
1963	The Nutty Professor	College Student	
1965	Harlow	Serena Harrison	Uncredited
1965	Winter A-Go-Go	Dee Dee	
1965	Boeing Boeing	Pretty Girl	Uncredited
1966	Paradise, Hawaiian Style	Joanna	
1966	Fireball 500	Martha	
1972	The Doberman Gang	June	
1978	The Time Machine	Salem Quaker	TV movie
1981	The Devil and Max Devlin	Sheila	
1998	The Politics of Desire	Audience Member #8	(final film role)

== Television ==
Year	Title	Role	Notes
1966	Star Trek: The Original Series	Miss Piper	S1:E11-E12, "The Menagerie"
1967-1968	Good Morning World	Linda Lewis	26 episodes
1972-1974	Return to Peyton Place	Betty Anderson Harrington Cord Harrington	423 episodes
