= Jim Nabors =

American actor and singer (1930–2017)

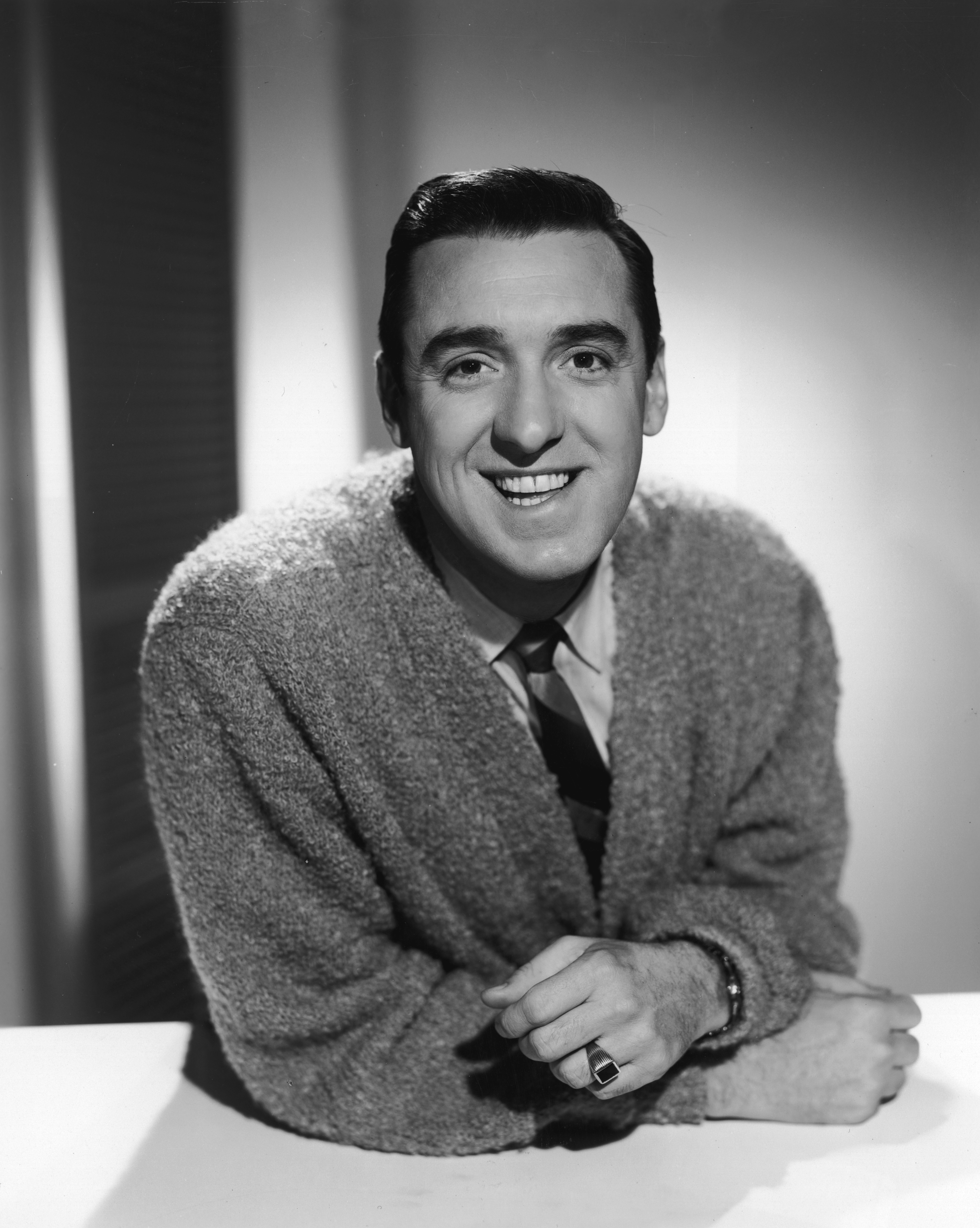
- Nabors in a c. 1965 publicity photo
- Born: James Thurston Nabors; June 12, 1930; Sylacauga, Alabama, U.S.
- Died: November 30, 2017 (aged 87); Honolulu, Hawaii, U.S.
- Resting place: Ashes sprinkled in Honolulu, Hawaii, U.S.
- Education: University of Alabama
- Occupations: Actor; singer
- Years active: 1954–2014
- Known for: Portraying Gomer Pyle on The Andy Griffith Show and Gomer Pyle – USMC; Singing "Back Home Again in Indiana" at the Indianapolis 500 race
- Height: 6 ft 0 in (1.83 m)
- Spouse: Stan Cadwallader (m. 2013)
- Website: Official website

James Thurston Nabors (June 12, 1930 – November 30, 2017) was an American actor, singer, and comedian, widely known for his signature character, Gomer Pyle.

Nabors was discovered by Andy Griffith while working at a Santa Monica nightclub, and he later joined The Andy Griffith Show, where he played the good-natured, unsophisticated Gomer Pyle. The character proved so popular that Nabors was given his own successful spin-off show, Gomer Pyle – USMC.

Nabors also became a popular guest on variety shows that showcased his rich baritone singing voice in the 1960s and 1970s. He was the featured guest on every season premiere of The Carol Burnett Show and he had two specials of his own in 1969 and 1974. He signed a recording contract with Columbia Records in 1965 and subsequently recorded numerous albums and singles, most of them containing romantic ballads. He recorded for Ranwood Records during the late 1970s.

Nabors was also known for singing "Back Home Again in Indiana" before the start of the Indianapolis 500, held annually on the Memorial Day weekend. He sang the unofficial Indiana anthem almost every year from 1972 to 2014, except for occasional absences due to illness or scheduling conflicts.

== Early life and career ==
Nabors was born in Sylacauga, Alabama, on June 12, 1930, to Fred Nabors, a police officer, and Mavis Pearl (née Newman). He had two older sisters, Freddie and Annie Ruth. He sang for his high school and church. Later, he attended the University of Alabama, where he began acting in skits. While at Alabama, he became a member of Delta Tau Delta International Fraternity. After graduating, he moved to New York City, where he worked as a typist for the United Nations; after a year, he moved to Chattanooga, Tennessee, where he got his first job in television as a film cutter at NBC affiliate WRGP-TV (now WRCB-TV) and was also a substitute co-host on the show Holiday for Housewives.

Because of his asthma, Nabors moved to Los Angeles and continued his work as a film cutter, this time for NBC. He also worked at a Santa Monica tavern, The Horn, singing and acting in cabaret theater. His act featured him as a character similar to the later Gomer Pyle. He sang in a baritone and sometimes spoke and sang in his higher-pitched comedic voice. At the club, comedian Bill Dana saw Nabors' act and invited him to appear on The Steve Allen Show. Nabors signed on to the show, but it was soon canceled.

== Career ==
=== Breakthrough and popularity ===
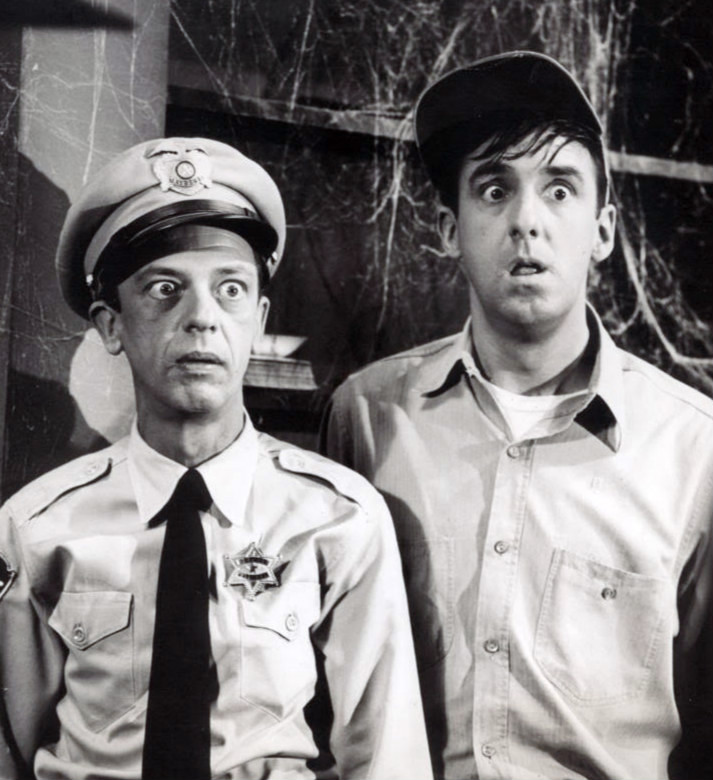
Nabors (at right) and Don Knotts in a publicity photo for The Andy Griffith Show (1964)

Nabors made his television debut as "Jimmy Nabors" on the Today in Dixie show on WJBF in Augusta, Georgia. He was active in the choir at Grace United Methodist Church in North Augusta.

Andy Griffith discovered Nabors at The Horn and hired him to play a one-shot role of Gomer Pyle, a dimwitted gas station attendant on The Andy Griffith Show in the third-season episode "Man in a Hurry." Nabors' character was based on his act at The Horn, and it became so popular that he was made a regular on the show and was later given the spin-off show Gomer Pyle – USMC, in which his character joined the Marines. The show placed Nabors' bungling, naive character opposite Gunnery Sergeant Vince Carter (Frank Sutton).

Gomer Pyle remained popular despite the concurrence of the Vietnam War because the series avoided war-related themes and instead focused on the character's rural roots and the relationship between Pyle and Carter. Considering himself more an entertainer than actor, Nabors resigned from Gomer Pyle – USMC after five seasons because he wanted to move on to something else, "reach for another rung on the ladder, either up or down."

=== Singing career ===
Nabors first revealed his fine singing voice on the February 24, 1964, "The Song Festers" episode of The Andy Griffith Show and on April 8, 1964, on The Danny Kaye Show, and subsequently capitalized on it with numerous successful recordings and live performances. Most of the songs were romantic ballads, though he sang pop, gospel, and country songs as well.

The climactic vocal performance on Gomer Pyle – USMC came in an episode titled "The Show Must Go On", aired November 3, 1967, in which Pyle sang "The Impossible Dream (The Quest)" in Washington, D.C., at a U.S. Navy relief show, accompanied by the Marine Band. A clip from the show, in which Pyle says the tag-line "Surprise, surprise, surprise!" appears in the Pink Floyd album The Wall in the song "Nobody Home". He hosted a variety show, The Jim Nabors Hour (1969–1971), which featured his Gomer Pyle co-stars Ronnie Schell and Frank Sutton. Despite a poor critical reception, the show was popular and earned an Emmy nomination. After the cancellation of The Jim Nabors Hour, Nabors embarked on a nationwide roadshow.

=== Later career ===
Typecast from his role as Gomer Pyle, Nabors found his subsequent roles mostly comedic. In the 1970s, he appeared in the children's television program The Krofft Supershow. He appeared in every season premiere of The Carol Burnett Show, because Burnett considered him a "good-luck charm". They were so close that he became the godfather to her daughter Jody.

In a 1973 episode of The Rookies, he played his first dramatic role, a man called on to be an assassin after the death of his sister. Also in 1973, Nabors sang "The Star-Spangled Banner" before Game One of the Major League Baseball World Series. From 1977 to 1978, Nabors hosted another variety show, The Jim Nabors Show. Though the show lasted only one season, Nabors was nominated for a Daytime Emmy Award for Outstanding Host or Hostess in a Talk, Service or Variety Series.

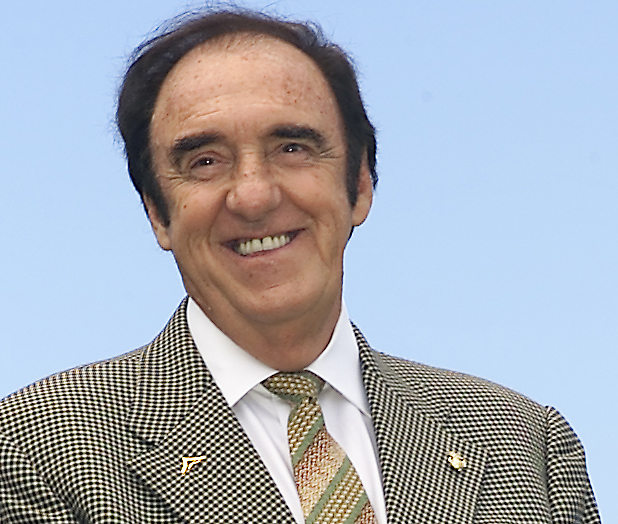
Nabors in 2001

Nabors eventually grew tired of the "prime-time TV grind" and abandoned television jobs for nightclub and concert engagements and a role in a touring production of Man of La Mancha. However, Sid and Marty Krofft persuaded Nabors to star in the Saturday-morning children's television show The Lost Saucer, about two bumbling androids, Fi (Ruth Buzzi) and Fum (Nabors), who travel through time with two children. Nabors, whose character was described as a "Gomer Pyle in outer space", sang in a few of the episodes. He also guest-starred on The Muppet Show (season 1, episode 6).

In the 1980s, Nabors appeared in three feature-length films starring his friend Burt Reynolds, at the latter's request. In The Best Little Whorehouse in Texas (1982), about a sheriff (Reynolds) who falls in love with a brothel madam (Dolly Parton), Nabors played Deputy Fred, a character similar to Gomer Pyle. Though the film received mostly unfavorable reviews, Nabors garnered some positive comments for his performance.

In 1983, Nabors played an auto mechanic in Stroker Ace, starring Burt Reynolds as a NASCAR race car driver who has a contentious relationship with his team owner, a fried-chicken fast-food chain entrepreneur. The film was panned, and Nabors earned a Golden Raspberry Award for his performance. In Reynolds' star-studded Cannonball Run II (1984), about a cross-country car chase, Nabors made a cameo appearance alongside such celebrities as Dom DeLuise, Jackie Chan, Shirley MacLaine, Dean Martin, Frank Sinatra, and Andy Griffith Show co-stars Don Knotts and George Lindsey. Like the two previous Reynolds films Nabors appeared in, Cannonball received mostly negative reviews.

In 1986, Nabors returned to television, reprising his role as Gomer Pyle in the television movie Return to Mayberry, in which the cast of The Andy Griffith Show reunited. Also in 1986, Nabors starred in the half-hour comedy pilot Sylvan in Paradise as the title character, Sylvan Sprayberry, an accident-prone bell captain at a Hawaiian hotel. The series was not picked up by NBC.

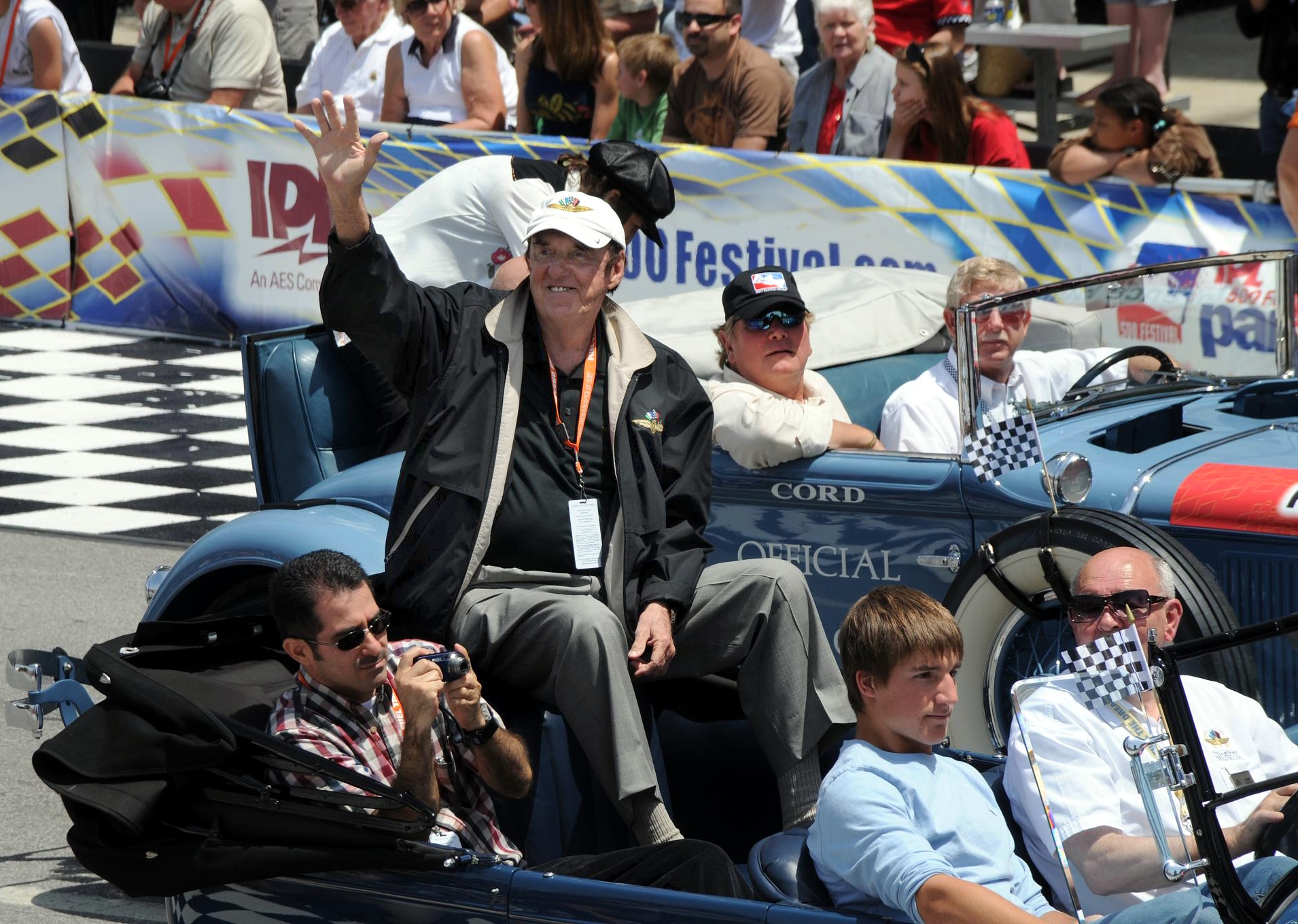
Nabors at the Indianapolis 500 in 2008. For over 40 years, he sang "Back Home Again in Indiana" before the start of the race.

After moving to Hawaii from Bel Air, California, with his partner Stan Cadwallader in 1976, he launched a show, The Jim Nabors Polynesian Extravaganza at the Hilton Hawaiian Village, which ran for two years. Nabors eventually experienced "bright-light burnout" and disappeared from the stage, save for an occasional performance. In 1984, after a five-year hiatus, Nabors returned to performing, starring in the "Moulin Rouge" show at the Las Vegas Hilton and other shows in Reno and Las Vegas. In 1982, he made his theatrical debut as Harold Hill in The Music Man with Florence Henderson at the Burt Reynolds Dinner Theatre in Jupiter, Florida.

In 1994, Nabors suffered from a near-fatal case of hepatitis B. According to Nabors, he contracted the disease while traveling in India; he shaved with a straight razor and "whacked [his] face all up." The disease caused liver failure, and Nabors was given a dim prognosis; however, his friend Carol Burnett contacted the head of the liver transplant division at the University of California, Los Angeles, and gave Nabors the information. Nabors later became involved with the American Liver Foundation as a result of his experience.

Shortly after recovering from his transplant, Nabors embarked on another tour, with stops in Phoenix, St. Louis, and Washington. From 1997 to 2006, Nabors starred in the Burton White-produced A Merry Christmas with Friends and Nabors, a live performance at the Hawaii Theatre Center in Honolulu. The production, featuring local and national artists, ran for 40 performances and was directed by Tom Hansen until Hansen's death in 2006. The final performance run was directed by John Rampage and dedicated to Hansen.

=== Retirement ===
From 1972 to 2014, Nabors sang "Back Home Again in Indiana" with the Purdue All-American Marching Band before each Indianapolis 500 race. In March 2014, Nabors announced that the 2014 Indianapolis 500 would be his final appearance, because health issues were limiting his ability to travel. After his retirement from this role, the singing of "Back Home Again in Indiana" was done on a rotating basis (as it had been before Nabors became the regular performer), before organizers named Chicago Blackhawks anthem singer Jim Cornelison as permanent replacement.

== Personal life ==
Nabors began vacationing in Hawaii in the 1960s, and in 1976, moved from Bel Air, California, to Honolulu, Hawaii. For 25 years, he owned a macadamia plantation on Maui before selling it to the National Tropical Botanical Garden, a conservationist organization, though he still retained farming rights to the land and owned a second home on the property.

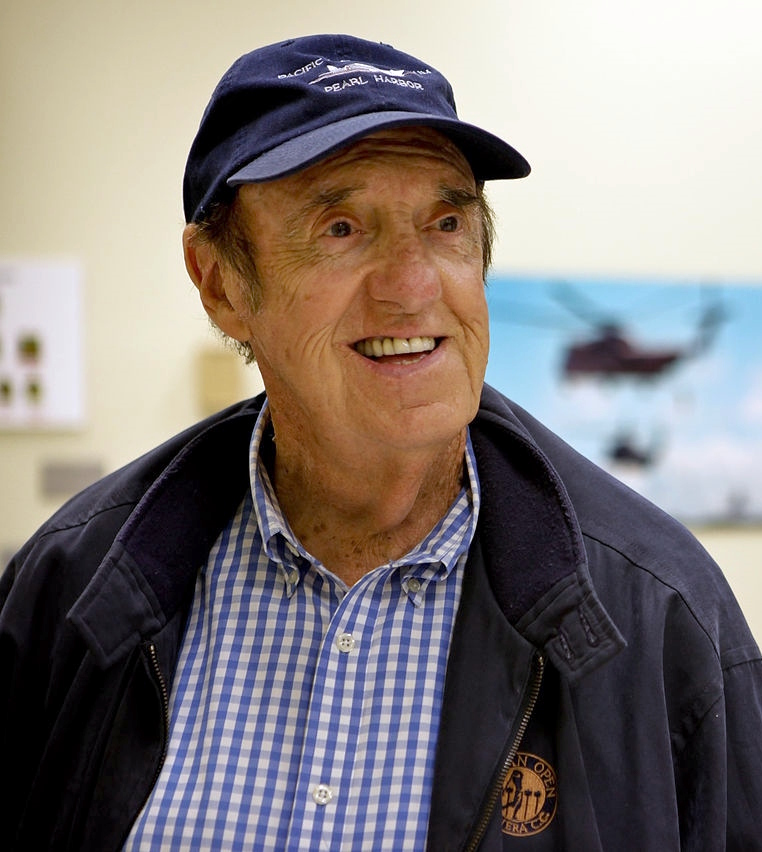
Nabors in 2010

He also owned a home and spent some summers in Whitefish, Montana, during the 1990s.

On January 15, 2013, Nabors married his partner of 38 years, Stan Cadwallader, at the Fairmont Olympic Hotel in Seattle, Washington, a month after same-sex marriage became legal in Washington. They had met in the 1970s, when Cadwallader was a fireman in Honolulu, and began dating in 1975. Although Nabors's homosexuality was not widely known before this, it was also not completely secret. For example, Nabors brought his then-partner Cadwallader along to his Indy 500 performance in 1978.

=== Alleged relationship with Rock Hudson ===
A longstanding rumor maintains that Nabors married actor Rock Hudson in the early 1970s, shortly before Nabors began his relationship with Cadwallader. The rumor may have started as a joke, "Rock Hudson married Jim Nabors. Now, he's Rock Pyle." Not only was same-sex marriage not legal anywhere in the United States at the time, but the two closeted homosexual actors were, according to each, never more than casual friends. Nabors believed that the rumors had originated from a fan magazine, which he briefly considered suing before his manager talked him out of the idea. He was deeply hurt by the insinuation at the time, calling the rumors of his homosexuality "horrible," "a nightmare, a bad dream," and "a vicious, unfounded and unwarranted story." Nabors publicly denied being gay, saying that, "I've been so busy with my career that I really haven't given marriage much thought." Hudson and Nabors last spoke to each other when Hudson appeared on The Jim Nabors Hour. The two never spoke again after the rumors broke out.

== Death ==
Nabors died at his Honolulu home on November 30, 2017, aged 87.

The United States Marine Corps' official Twitter account released a statement on Nabors death: "Semper Fi, Gomer Pyle. Rest in peace Jim Nabors, one of the few to ever be named an Honorary Marine." Second Lady of the United States and former First Lady of Indiana Karen Pence wrote on Twitter: "So sad to hear about the passing of Jim Nabors. We heard him sing 'Back Home Again in Indiana' at the Indianapolis 500 countless times. We will miss his beautiful voice."

In an interview with The Hollywood Reporter, Carol Burnett said she and Nabors were "close friends for 52 years. ... My heart is heavy. I'm grateful he was a large part of my life. I miss him. I love him." IndyCar driver Tony Kanaan said "Jim Nabors will always be the voice of 'Back Home Again in Indiana'". Journalist Larry King said Nabors was a "gentle man with immense talent" while sending condolences to his family.

== Accolades and honors ==
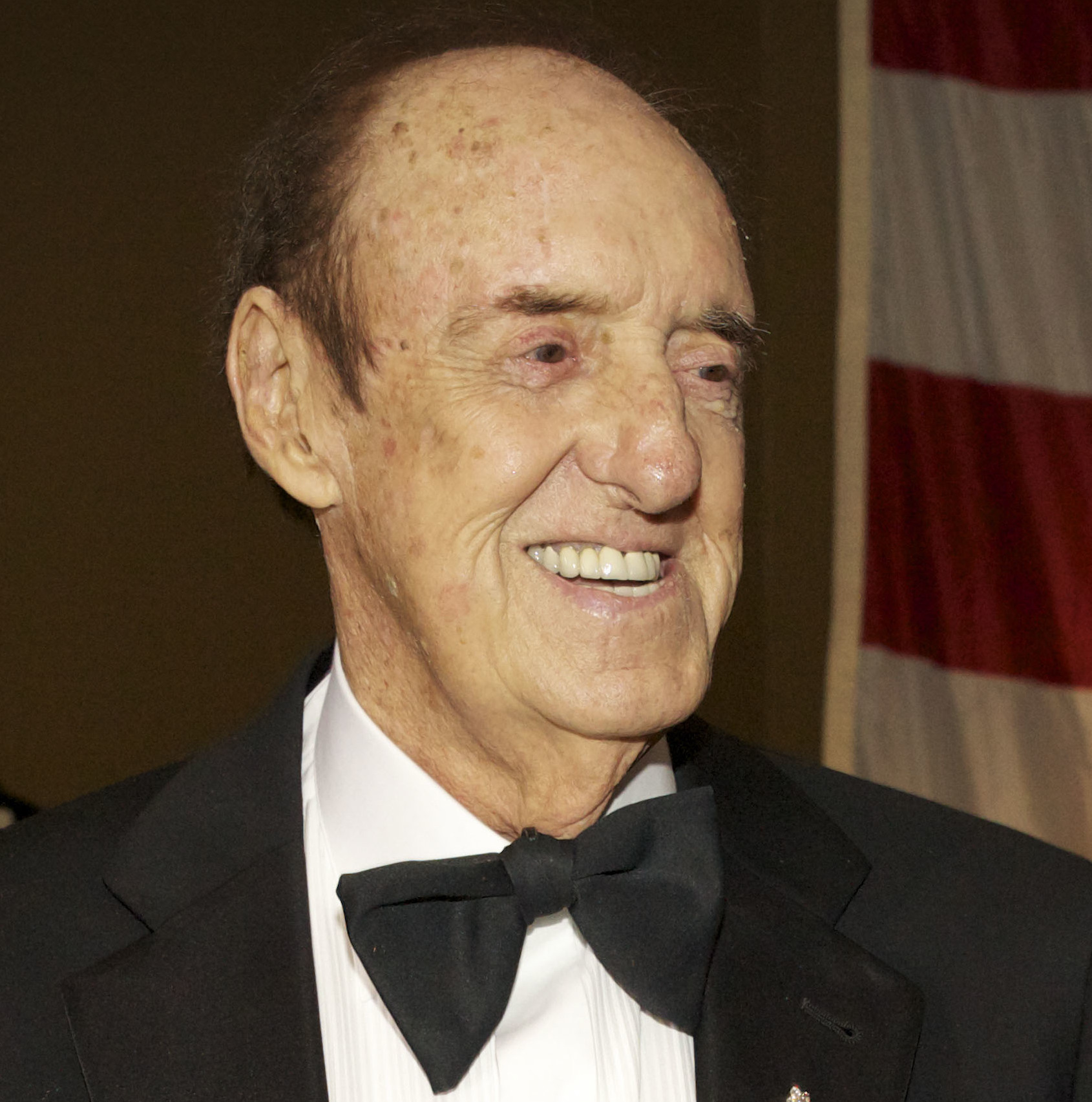
Nabors in 2013

Nabors' successes earned him accolades:

- Nabors received a star on the Hollywood Walk of Fame in 1991.
- "Gomer Pyle" received an honorary promotion to Lance corporal from the Commandant of the Marine Corps James L. Jones in 2001, and on September 25, 2007, he was promoted from Lance Corporal to Corporal by Lt. General John F. Goodman.
- The Hawaii Pacific University awarded Nabors the Fellow of the Pacific Award for his "outstanding leadership, service, and dedication to the community".
- He was inducted into the Alabama Stage and Screen Hall of Fame in 2006.
- He received honors from the University of Alabama on September 2, 2006, before a football game against the University of Hawaii.
- Nabors, along with U.S. Senator Daniel Inouye, was honored on January 19, 2007, at "A Night of American Heroes", a yearly dinner held in benefit of the Battleship Missouri Memorial at Pearl Harbor.
- In October 1978, the state of Alabama named a section of U.S. Route 280 in Talladega County, Alabama, "Jim Nabors Highway" in honor of the Sylacauga native.
- Jim Nabors was made an honorary Sergeant during the 238th Marine Corps birthday ball celebration on November 15, 2013, by Commandant of the Marine Corps Gen. James F. Amos.

== Selected discography ==
Nabors recorded 28 albums and numerous singles; three have been certified either gold or platinum by the Recording Industry Association of America (RIAA).

- Jim Nabors Sings Love Me with All Your Heart (released 1966, certified gold 1968)
- Jim Nabors Sings the Lord's Prayer (released 1968, certified gold 1974)
- Jim Nabors Christmas Album (released 1966, certified gold 1970)

== Filmography ==
Film
Year	Title	Role	Notes
1963	Take Her, She's Mine	Clancy	Uncredited
1982	The Best Little Whorehouse in Texas	Deputy Fred	
1983	Stroker Ace	Lugs Harvey	Won: Golden Raspberry Award for Worst Supporting Actor
1984	Cannonball Run II	Pvt. Homer Lyle	

Television
Year	Title	Role	Notes
1961	The Steve Allen Show	Himself	
1962–1964	The Andy Griffith Show	Gomer Pyle	23 episodes
1963	I'm Dickens, He's Fenster	Carlton	Episode: "The Carpenters Four"
1963	Mr. Smith Goes to Washington	Claude	2 episodes
1963	The Danny Kaye Show	Himself	2 episodes
1964–1969	Gomer Pyle – USMC	Gomer Pyle	150 episodes
1966	The Lucy Show	Gomer Pyle	Episode: "Lucy Gets Caught Up in the Draft"
1967	The Smothers Brothers Comedy Hour	Himself	Episode #1.1
1967–1977	The Carol Burnett Show	Himself	11 episodes (the premiere episode of each season)
1968	The Dean Martin Show	Himself	Episode: "1968 Christmas Show"
1969	The Don Rickles Show	Himself	Episode #1.16
1969	The Leslie Uggams Show	Himself	Episode #1.5
1969–1971	The Jim Nabors Hour	Host/Various character	51 episodes
1970–1971	Sesame Street	Himself	2 episode
1971	The Johnny Cash Show	Himself	Episode #2.19
1972–1973	The Flip Wilson Show	Himself	2 episodes
1973	The Rookies	Corley Curlew	Episode: "Down Home Boy"
1973–1974	The Sonny & Cher Comedy Hour	Himself/Various characters	4 episodes
1976	The Lost Saucer	Fum	16 episodes
1976	The Muppet Show	Himself/Billy Lee Boomer/Bakery Guard	Episode #1.4
1976–1977	The Sonny & Cher Show	Himself/Various characters	6 episodes
1977–1981	The Love Boat	Robert Tanner/Wayne Bouton	3 episodes
1978	The Jim Nabors Show	Host	Nominated for a Daytime Emmy for Outstanding Host or Hostess in a Talk, Service or Variety Series
1978	Buford and The Galloping Ghost	Deputy Goofer McGee (voice)	13 episodes
1981	Aloha Paradise	Himself	Episode: "Alex and Annie/Blue Honeymoon/Another Thing"
1986	Return to Mayberry	Gomer Pyle	Television movie
1986	Sylvan in Paradise	Sylvan Sprayberry	Television movie
1991	Hi Honey, I'm Home!	Gomer Pyle	Episode: "Hi Mom, I'm Not Home"
1991	The Carol Burnett Show	Skit characters	Unknown episodes

== Bibliography ==
- Brower, Neil (1998). Mayberry 101: Behind the Scenes of a TV Classic. John F. Blair. ISBN 978-0-8958-7218-0.
- Kelly, Richard (1985). The Andy Griffith Show. John F. Blair. ISBN 978-0-8958-7043-8.
- Olson, James Stuart (December 30, 1990). Historical Dictionary of the 1960s. Greenwood Publishing Group. ISBN 978-0-3132-9271-2.
- Browne, Ray Broadus; Browne, Pat (2001). The Guide to United States Popular Culture. Greenwood Publishing Group. ISBN 978-0-8797-2821-2.
- Erickson, Hal (1998). Sid and Marty Krofft: A Critical Study of Saturday Morning Children's Television, 1969–1993. McFarland & Company. pp. 138–154. ISBN 978-0-7864-0518-3.
- Everett, Wendy (2000). The Seeing Century: Film, Vision and Identity. Rodopi Publishers. p. 191. ISBN 978-90-420-1494-7.
- Brioux, Bill (2007). "Would You Believe...? Strange Stories from the '60s". Truth and Rumors: The Reality Behind TV's Most Famous Myths. Greenwood Publishing Group. pp. 61–62. ISBN 978-0-275-99247-7.
