= The Doberman Gang =

1972 film

- Theatrical release poster
- Directed by: Byron Ross Chudnow
- Written by: Louis Garfinkle; Frank Ray Perilli
- Produced by: David Chudnow; Irving Temaner
- Starring: Byron Mabe; Hal Reed; Julie Parrish; Simmy Bow; JoJo D'Amore; John Tull; Jay Paxton
- Cinematography: Robert Caramico
- Edited by: Herman Freedman
- Music by: Alan Silvestri; Bradford Craig
- Production company: Rosamond Productions
- Distributed by: Dimension Pictures
- Release date: May 26, 1972 (Atlanta)
- Running time: 87 minutes
- Country: United States
- Language: English
- Budget: $100,000 (estimated)
- Box office: $5 million

The Doberman Gang is a 1972 American crime comedy film about a talented animal trainer who prepares a pack of six Doberman Pinschers to commit a bank robbery at the behest of a ruthless heist planner. The six dogs were all named after famous bank robbers. Their names were Dillinger (John Dillinger), Bonnie (Bonnie Parker), Clyde (Clyde Barrow), Pretty Boy Floyd, Baby Face Nelson, and Ma Barker.

The film's score was the first to be composed by Alan Silvestri, who found later success with the soundtracks for more notable films such as the Back to the Future trilogy and Forrest Gump.

The film was shot completely on location in Simi Valley, California.

== Plot ==
Three bank robbers – Eddie, Jojo and Sammy - plan what they think is a perfect bank heist. As they exit the bank one of them throws the money in the trunk of what looks like their car but is just identical. Dejected, the leader of the crew, Eddie, muses that the human factor is what goes wrong with his plans and that what he needs is robots – something that he can control and that will follow orders exactly. The three part ways, and Eddie is left to come up with his next plan. Eddie finds his inspiration as he watches three Doberman Pinschers trap a couple of boys who were trying to rob a junkyard. He poses as a journalist doing a story about trained military dogs and convinces an Air Force dog handler named Barney to work with him in a dog training business. At the same time, Eddie reconnects with Jojo and Sammy to come up with a plan to rob a payroll from a bank, including building a replica of the bank.

When Barney is discharged from the Air Force, he comes to work with Eddie and is surprised when Eddie has Dobermans for Barney to train instead of German Shepherds, which is what Barney is accustomed to training. Barney, unaware that Eddie is planning to use the dogs in his heist, reluctantly agrees to train the six Dobermans, to which Eddie bestows the names of famous bank robbers (Dillinger, Bonnie, Clyde, Pretty Boy Floyd, Baby Face Nelson and Ma Barker). They are accompanied by a bulldog that Eddie names J. Edgar, after J. Edgar Hoover. As Barney trains the dogs, he becomes suspicious and figures out the bank robbery plot on his own. Barney confronts Eddie, who tells Barney that he is free to leave and not to worry about the dogs. Eddie reveals that if Barney leaves, he’ll kill the dogs. Barney has also become close with Eddie’s girlfriend, June, and she convinces Barney to stay and finish the job. Eddie outlines the specifics of the plan to Barney, which, if successful, will net the crew $600,000 if all of the dogs come back successfully. For his part Barney wants half of the take, but he agrees to a one-fourth share after some convincing by Sammy. June is left out of the arrangement but gets a promise from Eddie to receive $15,000 out of his share. June realizes that Eddie sees her as disposable, and she and Barney get even closer behind Eddie’s back.

On the day of the bank robbery, all six dogs do exactly what they are trained to do and enter the bank one at a time, lying down and waiting for the command to start the robbery. Dillinger is the last to enter and carries the note giving the instructions to the tellers. Just before he’s supposed to blow the dog whistles corresponding to each dog, Barney has second thoughts (because June, looking for a bigger share, tells him the dogs will be killed afterwards to get rid of evidence) and leaves the command post across the street. Eddie and June are left to finish the operation and blow the whistles. While Sammy and Jojo head back to the training ranch, sprinkling dirt from the ranch along the way as a sort of trail of breadcrumbs, June picks up where Barney left off. The operation goes off exactly as planned, and the dogs collect the money and head home. One of the Dobermans is hit by a car, and another dog collects that dog’s saddlebag and continues on its way. Another dog is distracted by a white Husky in a backyard and stops to make friends with it. Eddie connects with Sammy and Jojo at the ranch, but June goes to a different spot and blows the whistles again, giving the command to the dogs to attack the bank robbers. She blows the whistles again, and the dogs collect the bags of money and run to June’s location, where she hopes to get the money, but the dogs will not let her have it. They're not robots—only Barney had any feeling for them, so they feel no connection to anyone else. She tries to get the whistles to signal to the dogs one more time, but J. Edgar takes the whistles and runs off as the Dobermans follow him. June runs after the dogs but can’t catch them. As June watches, J. Edgar and the five remaining Dobermans run into a valley carrying the bags of money.

== Cast ==
- Byron Mabe as Eddie Newton
- Hal Reed as Barney Greer
- Julie Parrish as June
- Simmy Bow as Sammy
- JoJo D'Amore as Jojo
- John Tull as Pet Shop Owner
- Jay Paxton as Bank Manager

== Reception ==
Gene Siskel of the Chicago Tribune gave the film 3 stars out of 4, likening it to "sort of a canine 'Bonnie and Clyde' in quality as well as content," and wrote that although "the film runs out of creative gas after the robbery and settles for a stupid ending, the robbery and its planning provide generous portions of laughs and tension." Kevin Thomas of the Los Angeles Times wrote, "Low in budget but high in imaginativeness, it's an amusing, well-crafted diversion." John Raisbeck of The Monthly Film Bulletin wrote that the film "hovers uncertainly between straight thriller and comedy, and although some sequences are played quite overtly for laughs ... the comic element elsewhere seems to be trickling in unintentionally."

== Sequels and remakes ==
The Doberman Gang was followed by three sequels: The Daring Dobermans (1973), The Amazing Dobermans (1976) and Alex and the Doberman Gang (1980). The first two films were released on manufacture-on-demand DVD-R discs as part of the Warner Archive Collection from 35mm optical sound release prints in 2010, while the original's out-of-print 1986 videocassette release from CBS/Fox's Key Video label used superior quality magnetic soundtrack elements from Lorimar Productions, whose film library they were issuing on video at the time.

In 2003 it was reported that producers Dean Devlin and Charles Segars obtained the film rights in hopes of creating a remake, with Byron Chudnow acting as executive producer. In October 2010 it was announced that producer Darren Reagan of 11eleven Entertainment, along with Cesar Millan, was developing the remake.

== See also ==
- List of American films of 1972
