= Frank Sutton =

American actor (1923-1974)

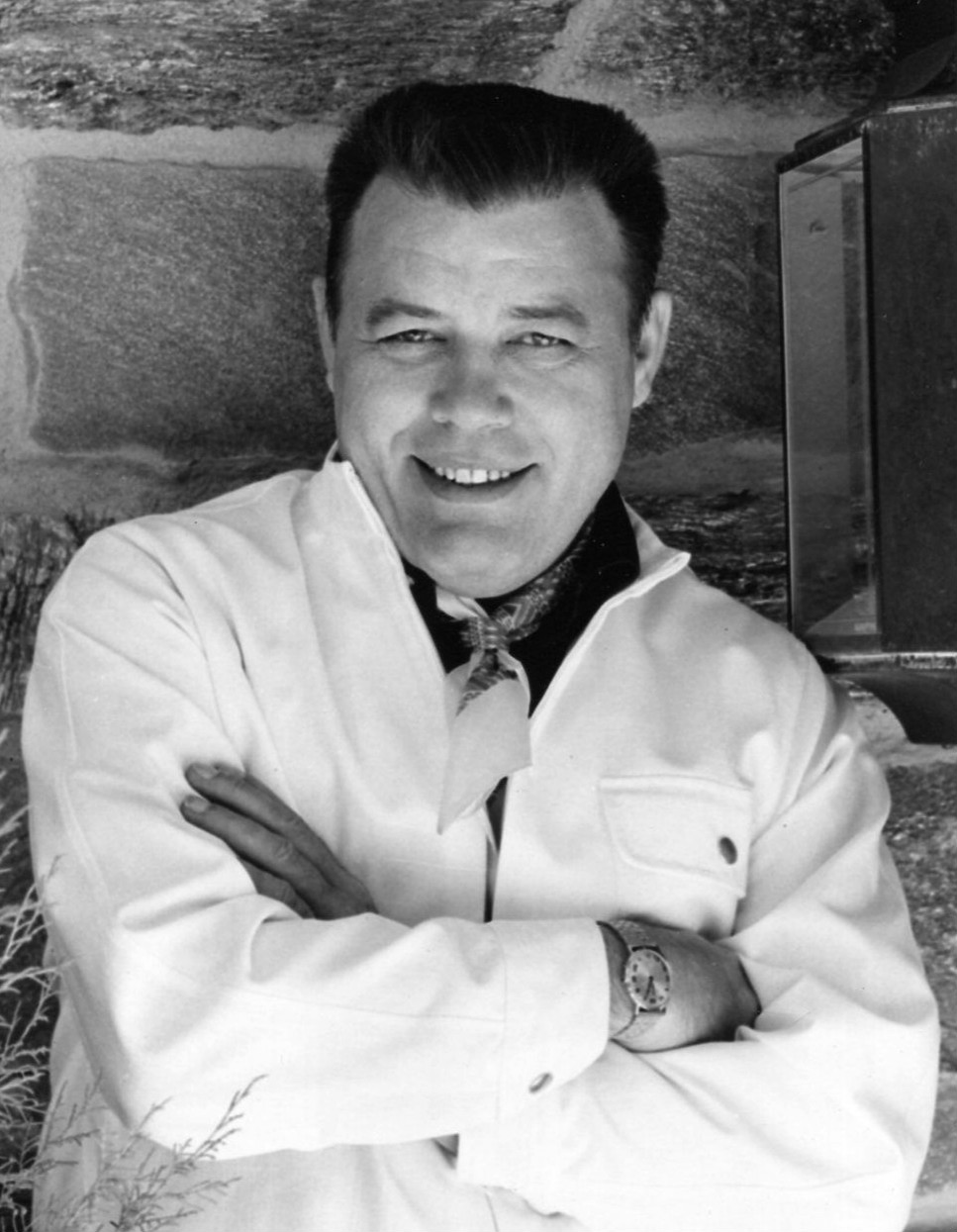
- Sutton in a 1969 publicity photo
- Born: Frank Spencer Sutton; October 23, 1923; Clarksville, Tennessee, U.S.
- Died: June 28, 1974 (aged 50); Shreveport, Louisiana, U.S.
- Resting place: Greenwood Cemetery, Clarksville, Tennessee, U.S. 36°30′24.8″N 87°20′31.9″W
- Education: Columbia University (BS)
- Television: Gomer Pyle – USMC
- Spouse(s): Toby M. Igler (m.1946–his death)
- Children: 2
- Military career
- Allegiance: United States
- Branch: United States Army
- Service years: 1943–1946
- Rank: Sergeant
- Conflicts: World War II: Asiatic-Pacific Theater

Frank Spencer Sutton (October 23, 1923 – June 28, 1974) was an American actor best remembered for his role as Gunnery Sergeant Vince Carter on the CBS television series Gomer Pyle – USMC.

== Early life ==
Born in Clarksville, Tennessee, Sutton developed an interest in acting, playing his first role at age nine and also starring in the drama club at East Nashville High School, where he graduated in 1941. He later said, "The first time I walked out on a stage, I had a warm feeling. I knew then I wanted to be an actor."

After high school, Sutton returned to Clarksville to become a radio announcer. During World War II, he volunteered for service in the U.S. Marine Corps, but he was medically rejected due to his color blindness. He then enlisted in the U.S. Army and served in the South Pacific, taking part in 14 assault landings. Sutton was a sergeant who served from 1943 to 1946 in the 6th Infantry Division's 293rd Joint Assault Signal Company.

=== Combat and Non-Combat Operations ===
- 1944-1945 Leyte Campaign (1944-45)/Battle of Leyte
- 1944-1945 WWII - Asiatic-Pacific Theater/Luzon Campaign (1944-45)
- 1945-1945 Luzon Campaign (1944-45)/Battle for Recapture of Bataan
- 1945-1945 Luzon Campaign (1944-45)/Battle for Manila
- 1945-1946 US Occupation of South Korea

=== Military awards and decorations ===

1st Row	Bronze Star Medal		Purple Heart
2nd Row	Army Good Conduct Medal	American Campaign Medal	Asiatic–Pacific Campaign Medal with two service stars
3rd Row	World War II Victory Medal	Army of Occupation Medal	Philippine Liberation Medal
Philippine Republic Presidential Unit Citation

== Acting career ==
Honorably discharged after the war as a sergeant, he began acting on stage. He attended the Columbia University School of General Studies, graduating cum laude with a bachelor's degree in drama in 1952.

Throughout the 1950s and early 1960s, Sutton played small roles in television shows such as Decoy, Route 66, Naked City, The Greatest Show on Earth, The Fugitive, The Goldbergs, 87th Precinct, Gunsmoke, Target: The Corruptors, Empire, The Twilight Zone, and The Untouchables. He had a continuing role as Cadet Eric Rattison, the great rival of the Polaris Unit manned by the series' heroes, in Tom Corbett, Space Cadet from 1950 to 1955. In 1955, he received his big break in the Academy Award-winning movie Marty, in which he played the title character's friend, Ralph. He also had a role in The Satan Bug, a 1965 spy thriller. He returned to the stage in The Andersonville Trial in the early 1960s.

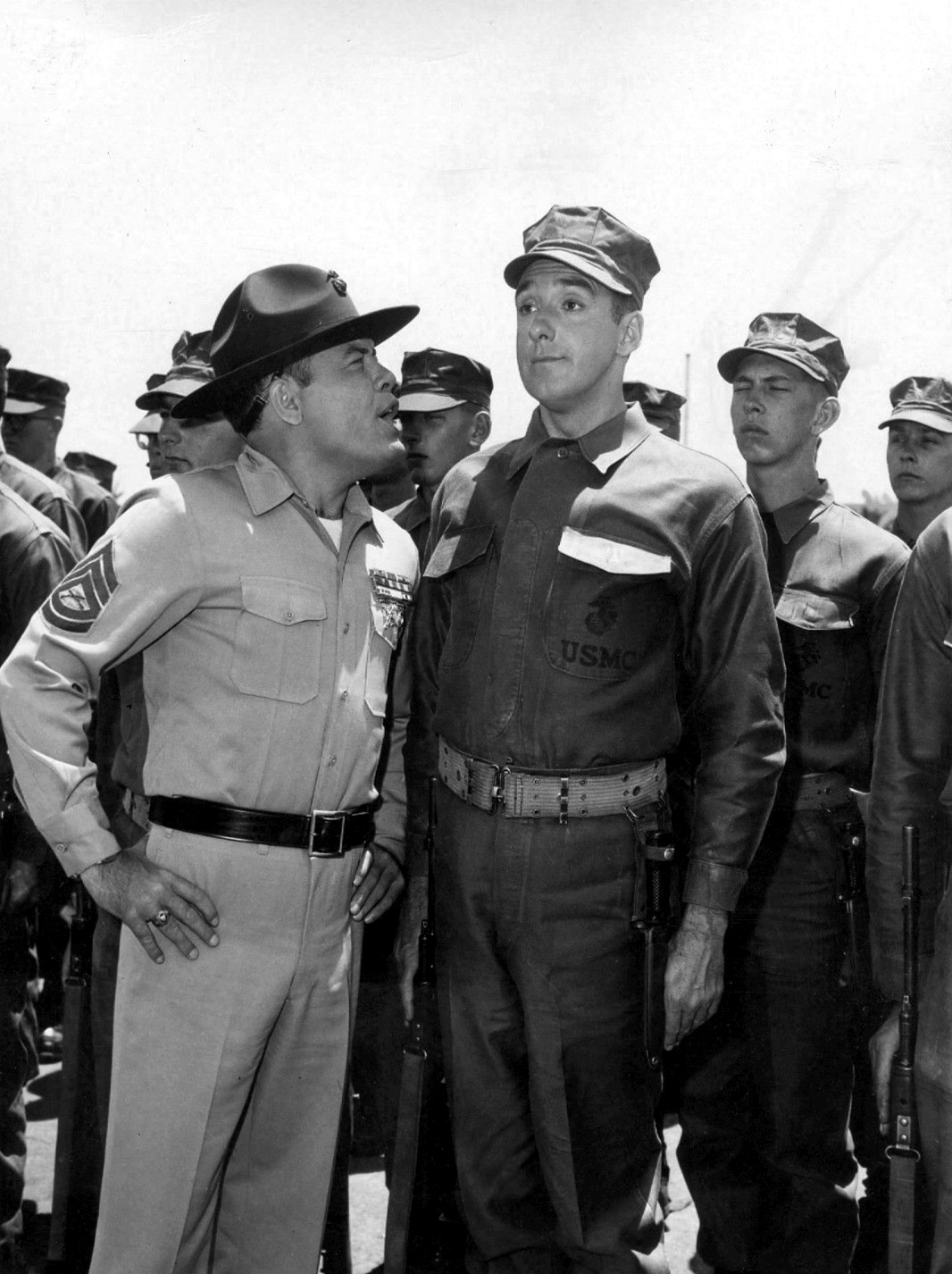
Sutton and Nabors in Gomer Pyle premiere, 1964

Having primarily acted in dramas, Sutton's breakthrough role was on Gomer Pyle – USMC, a 1964 episode of The Andy Griffith Show, in which he played the cynical and easily exasperated Gunnery Sergeant Vince Carter opposite Jim Nabors' character Gomer Pyle. This episode was the pilot for a spin-off TV comedy, Gomer Pyle – USMC, where Sutton continued the role for five seasons, until the show ended its run in 1969. He also appeared in public service announcements in the role of Gunnery Sergeant Carter. After Gomer Pyle ceased production, Sutton appeared regularly on Nabors' variety show The Jim Nabors Hour with Gomer Pyle co-star Ronnie Schell. Sutton played the brother-in-law of Nabors' character in comedy sketches. Sutton performed in dinner theater, playing, among other roles, the father in Norman, Is That You? and made guest appearances on other television programs.

== Personal life and death ==
In 1946, Sutton married soap-opera writer Toby M. Igler, with whom he had two children, Joe Sutton and Amanda.

On June 28, 1974, while preparing for a performance in the comedy play Luv at the Beverly Barn Dinner Playhouse in Shreveport, Louisiana, Sutton died of a heart attack. He is buried in the Greenwood Cemetery in his hometown of Clarksville, Tennessee.

== Filmography ==
Film
Year	Title	Role	Notes
1950	The Goldbergs	Dutch	
1954	"The Glen Miller Story"	Singing Group Member	
1955	Marty	Ralph	Uncredited
1957	Four Boys and a Gun	Ollie Denker	
1961	Town Without Pity	Sgt. Chuck Snyder	
1965	The Satan Bug	Donald	
1974	Hurricane	Bert Pearson	Television movie released posthumously (final film role)
Television
Year	Title	Role	Notes
1950-1955	Tom Corbett, Space Cadet	Cadet Eric Raddison	
1954	The Glenn Miller Story	uncredited	
1956	The Edge of Night	Sgt. Fitzsimmons	
1958-1961	Naked City	Franklin Maquon	
1960-1961	Deadline	John McDowell	Lead role in the episode "To Move a Mountain" (1960)
1960-1961	The Secret Storm	Joe Sullivan #2	
1961-1962	Gunsmoke	Charlie (1961); Olie (1962); Billy Tooker/Marston (1962)	
1962	Have Gun – Will Travel	Davey Walsh	One-time role – The Trap (1962)
1962	The Twilight Zone	Frank, Jerry's manager	One-time role in episode "The Dummy"
1962-1963	Combat!	Corporal Cording	– The Chateau (1963)
1962-1963	The Untouchables	Benny Stryker (1962); Smiley Barris (1962); Angie Stazak (1963); Sgt. Davey McCain (1963)	The Stryker Brothers (1962) ... Benny Stryker; The Contract (1962) ... Smiley Barris; The Speculator (1963) ... Angie Stazak; The Butcher's Boy (1963) ... Sgt. Davey McCain
1963	The Fugitive	(deputy) Jackson	One-time role in episode 3 "The Other Side of the Mountain"
1963	Death Valley Days	Diamondfield Jack	Episode: Diamond Field Jack aired October 1, 1963
1964	The Andy Griffith Show	Gunnery Sergeant Vince Carter	One-time role in episode "Gomer Pyle – USMC"
1964-1969	Gomer Pyle – USMC	Gunnery Sergeant Vince Carter	
1966	Password	Himself	Game show contestant / Celebrity guest star
1969-1971	The Jim Nabors Hour	Himself	
1970–1973	Love American Style	Various	Episodes: Love and the Bonded Separation (1973); Love and the Secret Life (1972); Love and the Guru (1972); Love and the Lady Barber (1971) ... Herb Redding; Love and the Haunted House (1970) ... Walter

== See also ==
- List of Gomer Pyle – USMC characters
- List of people from Tennessee
