= The Jim Nabors Hour =

Television series (1969–71)

- Genre: Variety
- Starring: Jim Nabors; Ronnie Schell; Frank Sutton; Karen Morrow
- No. of seasons: 2
- No. of episodes: 51

Production
- Executive producer: Richard O. Linke
- Producers: Bruce Johnson; E. Duke Vincent

Original release
- Network: CBS
- Release: September 25, 1969 – March 11, 1971

The Jim Nabors Hour is an American variety television series hosted by Jim Nabors that aired on the CBS television network from 1969 to 1971.

Fresh from his success with Gomer Pyle, U.S.M.C., which put his backwoods "Gomer Pyle" character from The Andy Griffith Show in a military context, the show not only built on that success, but also displayed his baritone singing voice, which had been used on the Pyle show on occasion and had earned Nabors several gold records in the late 1960s.

Two of Nabors' co-stars from Gomer Pyle, Ronnie Schell and Frank Sutton, appeared as regulars along with Karen Morrow and many guest stars. The Tony Mordente Dancers and the Nabors Kids provided musical support for the song and dance routines. Nabors's last appearance with Rock Hudson came during an episode of The Jim Nabors Hour, after which persistent rumors concerning the pair's sexual orientation forced them to never see each other again.

The show was consistently in the top 30 of the Nielsen ratings and performed strongly in its time slot, but fell victim to the CBS "rural purge" and was axed by the network after two seasons; the last episode was broadcast on March 11, 1971.

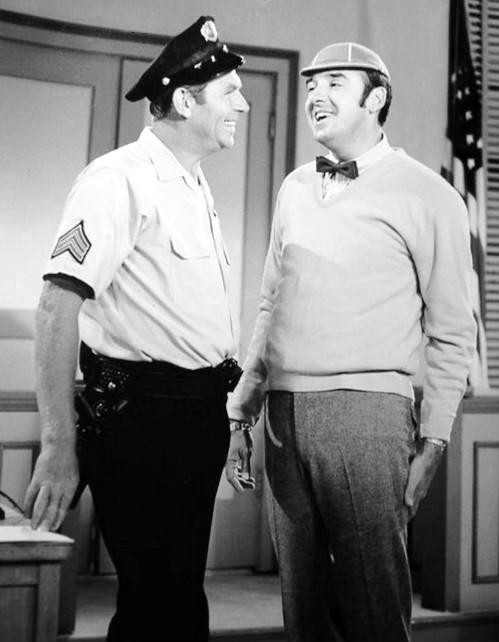
Guest star Andy Griffith and Nabors in a skit from the show's premiere, September 25, 1969.

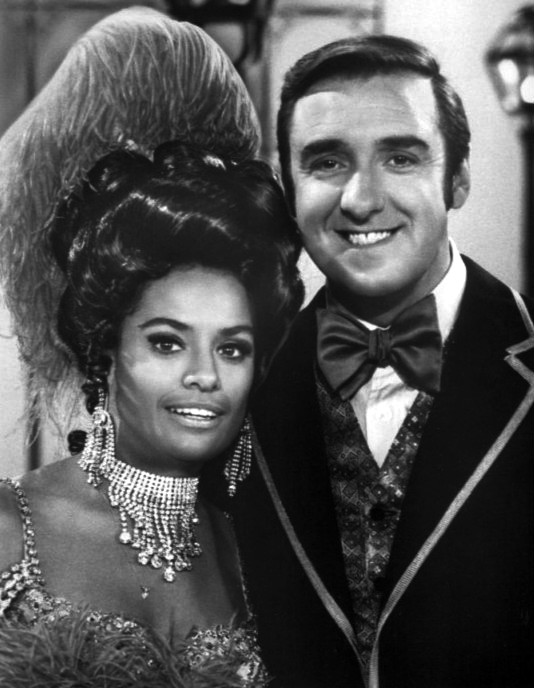
With Barbara McNair, 1970
