= Good Morning World (American TV series) =

American sitcom (1967–1968)

- Complete series DVD cover
- Genre: Sitcom
- Created by: Bill Persky; Sam Denoff; Carl Reiner; Sheldon Leonard
- Written by: Carl Biddiscombe; Sam Bobrick; Joseph Bonaduce; John C. Chulay; James L. Brooks; Sam Denoff; Peggy Elliott; Bill Idelson; Bruce Johnson; Carl Kleinschmitt; Rick Mittleman; Dale McRaven; Bernie Orenstein; Ronnie Pearlman; Bill Persky; Ed Scharlach; Saul Turtletaub; E. Duke Vincent; Jack Winter; Sydney Zelinka
- Directed by: Danny Dayton; Gary Nelson; Carl Reiner; John Rich; Robert Scheerer; George Tyne
- Starring: Ronnie Schell; Joby Baker; Billy De Wolfe; Goldie Hawn; Julie Parrish
- Theme music composer: Dave Grusin
- Composer: Dave Grusin
- Country of origin: United States
- Original language: English
- No. of seasons: 1
- No. of episodes: 26

Production
- Executive producers: Sheldon Leonard; Carl Reiner
- Producers: Sam Denoff; Bill Persky
- Running time: 30 mins.
- Production company: Discus Productions

Original release
- Network: CBS
- Release: September 5, 1967 – March 19, 1968

Good Morning World is an American sitcom broadcast on CBS during the 1967–1968 season, originally sponsored by Procter & Gamble on Tuesday nights at 9:30 pm ET.

== Plot ==
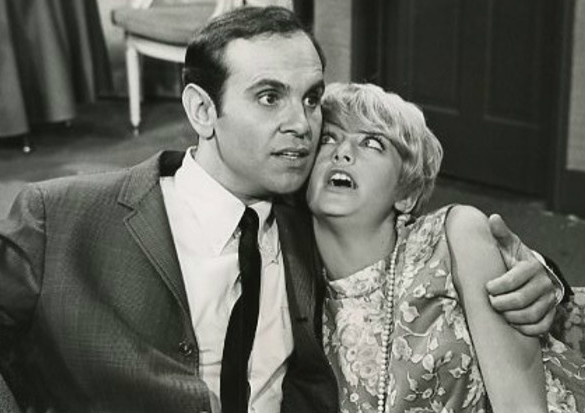
Larry (Ronnie Schell) and Sandy (Goldie Hawn).

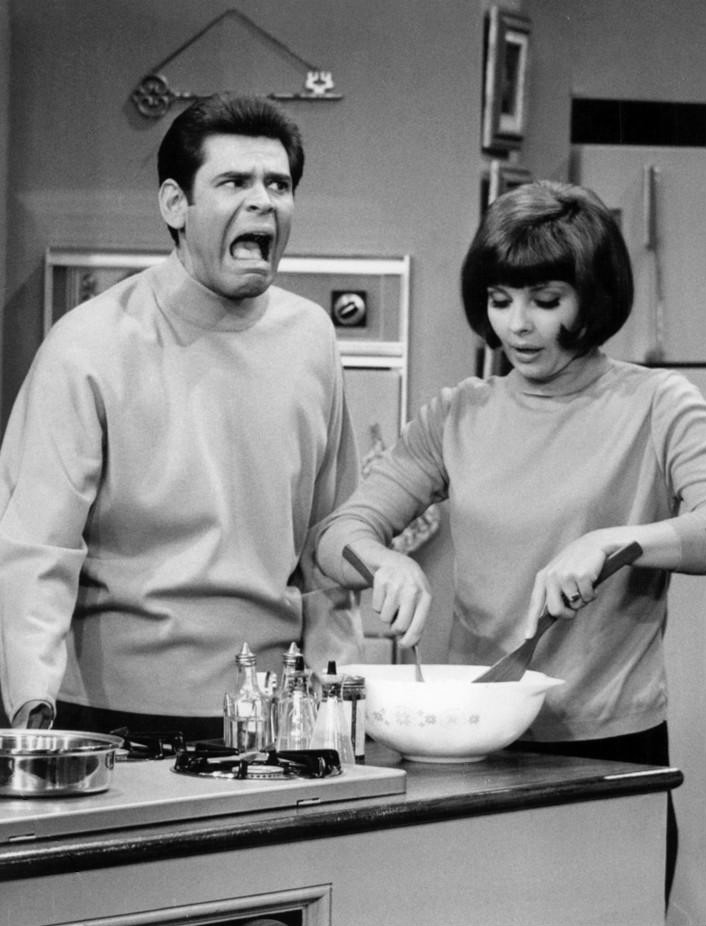
Dave (Joby Baker) and Linda (Julie Parrish).

Good Morning World starred Joby Baker and Ronnie Schell as Dave Lewis and Larry Clarke, morning drive time disc jockeys and hosts of the eponymous "Lewis and Clarke Show" on a small AM radio station in Los Angeles. The two host the show under the supervision of station manager Roland B. Hutton Jr., portrayed by Billy De Wolfe in his usual character. Frequently appearing in the subplots was Julie Parrish as Lewis's wife Linda, as well as her aggressive best friend Sandy Kramer, played by Goldie Hawn in her first professional role.

The series was created and produced by Carl Reiner, Sheldon Leonard, Bill Persky, and Sam Denoff, all of whom were creatively responsible for the critically acclaimed and commercially successful The Dick Van Dyke Show (1961–66) and was inspired by Persky and Denoff's personal experiences working as continuity writers for several disc jockeys on radio station WNEW in New York during the 1950s. In fact, William B. Williams, one of the station's most popular deejays, received screen credit for originating the show's title, which was adapted from his famous opening greeting, "Hello, world!".

Good Morning World was filmed before a live studio audience. Los Angeles Dodgers broadcaster Vin Scully did voice-over narration in some of the episodes.

Ronnie Schell, on the DVD commentary for the series, claimed that the show had been on the bubble for a second season renewal on CBS, but the network was also not entirely satisfied with the main cast, either Baker or Parrish, who was having health concerns that slowed down her performance as the season progressed. Recasting both actors was considered, but CBS, unimpressed with the program losing audience from its lead-in The Red Skelton Show, canceled the show instead. After the show's cancellation after a single season, Schell returned to his previous role on Gomer Pyle, USMC, while Hawn joined the cast of Rowan & Martin's Laugh-In in what would prove to be her breakout role. De Wolfe joined the cast of The Doris Day Show on a recurring basis.

== Cast ==
- Ronnie Schell as Larry Clarke
- Joby Baker as Dave Lewis
- Billy De Wolfe as Roland Hutton, Jr.
- Julie Parrish as Linda Lewis
- Goldie Hawn as Sandy Kramer

== Episodes ==
No.	Title	Directed by	Written by	Original release date	Prod. code
1	"Knits to You, Sir"	Carl Reiner	Rick Mittleman	September 5, 1967	1
2	"You Can't Say That About Me and Neither Can I"	Carl Reiner	Peggy Elliott & Ed Scharlach	September 12, 1967	26
3	"You vs. Me"	George Tyne	Jack Winter	September 19, 1967	9
4	"If You Go Into the Blue Yonder, I'll Go Wild"	Unknown	Unknown	September 26, 1967	2
5	"Buy Calamari"	Unknown	Unknown	October 3, 1967	25
6	"Where Have You Been, Billy Boy, Billy Boy?"	Unknown	Unknown	October 10, 1967	7
7	"Love at First Flight"	Danny Dayton	Rick Mittleman	October 24, 1967	4
8	"No News Like Nude News"	George Tyne	Rick Mittleman	October 31, 1967	5
9	"Stan and Ollie Meet Larry and Dave"	Gary Nelson	Sydney Zelinka	November 7, 1967	8
10	"Feet of Clay and a Head to Match"	Robert Scheerer	Bernie Orenstein & Saul Turtletaub	November 14, 1967	6
11	"The Return of Bibian"	John Rich	Bernie Orenstein & Saul Turtletaub	November 21, 1967	11
12	"If You Marry Me Today, I'll Marry You Tomorrow"	Unknown	Unknown	November 28, 1967	13
13	"Don't Call Us and We Won't Call You"	Unknown	Unknown	December 5, 1967	3
14	"The Voice of the Turtle Is Better Than Mine"	Unknown	Unknown	December 12, 1967	14
15	"The Man Who Came to Din Din"	Gary Nelson	Bruce Howard	December 19, 1967	16
16	"Now I Lay Me Down to Sleep, Maybe"	John Rich	E. Duke Vincent	December 26, 1967	12
17	"First Down and 200 Miles to Go"	Gary Nelson	E. Duke Vincent & Bruce Howard	January 2, 1968	16
18	"I Want a Girl Just Like the Girl That Married Dear Old Dave"	Danny Dayton	Carl Kleinschmitt & Dale McRaven	January 9, 1968	15
19	"The Wedding Present"	Gary Nelson	Sam Bobrick & Bill Idelson	January 16, 1968	17
20	"Partner Meet My Partner"	Gary Nelson	E. Duke Vincent	January 23, 1968	18
21	"Pot Luckless"	Gary Nelson	Jim Brooks	January 30, 1968	10
22	"I Love a Charade"	Gary Nelson	Rick Mittleman	February 6, 1968	20
23	"For My Daughter's Hand, You'll Get My Foot"	Gary Nelson	E. Duke Vincent & Bruce Johnson	February 20, 1968	21
24	"Here Comes the Bribe"	Gary Nelson	Story by : Ronnie Pearlman; Teleplay by : Bruce Howard	February 27, 1968	22
25	"Hutton's Mutt"	Gary Nelson	Bill Persky & Sam Denoff; E. Duke Vincent & Bruce Johnson	March 12, 1968	24
26	"The Lady and the Pussycat"	Gary Nelson	Joseph Bonaduce	March 19, 1968	23

== Home media ==
On January 17, 2006, all 26 episodes of Good Morning, World were released on DVD by S'more Entertainment.
