= Roy Stuart (actor) =

American actor

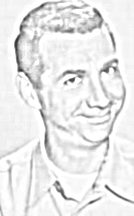
- Born: July 17, 1927; New York City, New York, U.S.
- Died: December 25, 2005 (aged 78); Woodland Hills, Los Angeles, U.S.
- Occupation: Actor
- Years active: 1963–1993

Roy Stuart (July 17, 1927 – December 25, 2005) was an American character actor. He is best known for playing Corporal Charles "Chuck" Boyle on television's Gomer Pyle, U.S.M.C. during seasons two, three, and four from 1965 to 1968.

== Biography and career ==
Born in The Bronx, New York, Stuart launched his career performing in nightclubs and theatre. His stage credits include the Broadway musicals Beg, Borrow or Steal (1960) and Cafe Crown (1964).

Stuart's TV guest appearances include Mister Ed, Bewitched, The Mothers-In-Law, Room 222, The Governor & J.J.; Love, American Style; Marcus Welby, M.D.; The Carol Burnett Show, Santa Barbara, Hotel, Gidget, Hazel, One Day at a Time, Sanford and Son, CHiPs, Scarecrow and Mrs. King, The Golden Girls, General Hospital, Laverne & Shirley and Mama's Family. He also appeared in numerous television commercials.

A long-standing member of Theatre West, Stuart also performed in local Theatre Forty productions of Absurd Person Singular and The Sunshine Boys.

Roy Stuart died at age 78 of cancer at the Motion Picture Hospital, Woodland Hills, California. He was survived by his companion, Claude Hubert. He is interred in Eden Memorial Park Cemetery, Mission Hills.

== Partial filmography ==
| Year | Title | Role | Notes |
|---|---|---|---|
| 1969 | The Love God? | Joe Merkel | |
| 1969 | Three's a Crowd | Buzzy Grant | |
| 1975 | Linda Lovelace for President | Veep Candidate | |
| 1985 | Prime Risk | Mr. Fox | |
| 1993 | Eye of the Stranger | Leonard | (final film role) |
