= Gomer Pyle – USMC =

American sitcom (1964–1969)

- Title screen
- Genre: Sitcom
- Created by: Aaron Ruben
- Starring: Jim Nabors; Frank Sutton
- Theme music composer: Earle Hagen
- Composers: Carl Brandt; Pete Carpenter; Earle Hagen
- Country of origin: United States
- Original language: English
- No. of seasons: 5
- No. of episodes: 150 (30 in black-and-white, 120 in color) (list of episodes)

Production
- Executive producers: Sheldon Leonard; Andy Griffith; Aaron Ruben
- Producers: Edward H. Feldman; Jack Elinson; Aaron Ruben
- Cinematography: John Finger
- Camera setup: Single-camera
- Running time: 22–24 minutes
- Production companies: Andy Griffith Enterprises; Ashland Productions; T & L Productions; CBS Productions

Original release
- Network: CBS
- Release: September 25, 1964 – May 2, 1969

Related
- The Andy Griffith Show

Gomer Pyle – USMC is an American sitcom originally aired on CBS from September 25, 1964, to May 2, 1969. The series was a spin-off of The Andy Griffith Show, and the pilot episode was aired as the season finale of the fourth season of its parent series on May 18, 1964. The show ran for a total of 150 half-hour episodes spanning five seasons, in black-and-white for the first season, and then in color for the remaining four seasons. In 2006, CBS Home Entertainment (distributed by Paramount) began releasing the series on DVD. The final season was released in November 2008.

Like its parent series, Gomer Pyle – USMC was also a major ratings hit, never placing lower than tenth in the Nielsen ratings, and ended its run as the second-highest-rated series in the United States (only behind Rowan & Martin's Laugh-In). It has enjoyed continued popularity through reruns and DVD releases. The series was created by Aaron Ruben, who also produced the show with Sheldon Leonard and Ronald Jacobs. Set and filmed in California, it stars Jim Nabors as Gomer Pyle, a naïve but good-natured gas station attendant from the town of Mayberry, North Carolina who enlists in the United States Marine Corps, and Frank Sutton as Gomer's high-octane, short-fused Gunnery sergeant Vince Carter.

== History ==
Everett Greenbaum and Jim Fritzell, writers for The Andy Griffith Show, are credited with creating the character of Gomer Pyle. The character was based on an "incompetent" gas station attendant whom Greenbaum met and named after Gomer Cool (a writer) and Denver Pyle (an actor on The Andy Griffith Show). Jim Nabors was cast to play Gomer; he had been performing for a Santa Monica nightclub, The Horn, when Andy Griffith discovered him. Though originally intended to appear in only one episode, Gomer proved popular, and after appearing in seasons 3 and 4, Nabors was given his own spin-off produced by Aaron Ruben. The pilot episode of Gomer Pyle was filmed in 1963 as part of The Andy Griffith Show, but was not aired until 1964, as the finale of The Andy Griffith Show's fourth season. In the episode, Andy accompanies Gomer when he reports to the Marine recruiting base at Camp Lejeune. The show was originally going to be called Gomer, was then changed to Gomer Pyle, until it finally became Gomer Pyle – USMC.

I had recently driven into a gas station with motor trouble. The attendant could think of no cure except to add more gas to the tank. We decided to write such an incompetent into the script.

— Everett Greenbaum on the creation of the character Gomer Pyle

The 1960s saw a return to "the more mundane sensibilities of comedy," due to viewers' wishes for television programming as a "cultural antidepressant." Thus, fantasy- and rurally-oriented comedies gained popularity and dominated the Nielsen ratings. Like other comedies at the time, Gomer Pyle was an "escapist" show; it avoided political commentary and offered viewers a distraction from the social changes of the 1960s. Despite being military-themed and airing during the peak of the Vietnam War, the show never discussed the war. Instead, it was based on "Gomer's innocent simplicity [and] Sergeant Carter's frustration and later concern for Gomer's well-being." This, along with the popularity of rural comedies in the 1960s, made the show popular. Frank Sutton, who played Carter, ascribed the show's popularity to its focus on its two main characters, and the plots being built around their personalities. The program was in the top 10 of the ratings throughout its run—and in the top three for all but its third season when CBS moved it from Fridays to Wednesdays. Approaching age 40, Nabors quit when he desired to move to something else, "reach for another rung on the ladder, either up or down."

After Gomer Pyle left the air, Jim Nabors hosted a variety show, The Jim Nabors Hour, from 1969 to 1971. As well as showcasing Nabors' rich singing baritone, the show included comedy sketches that featured Nabors's Gomer Pyle co-stars Frank Sutton and Ronnie Schell. Though advised that he should not leave Gomer Pyle, Nabors felt that the new show would still be exciting and noted that every character he portrayed in his sketches "turn[ed] out to be Gomer."

== Premise ==
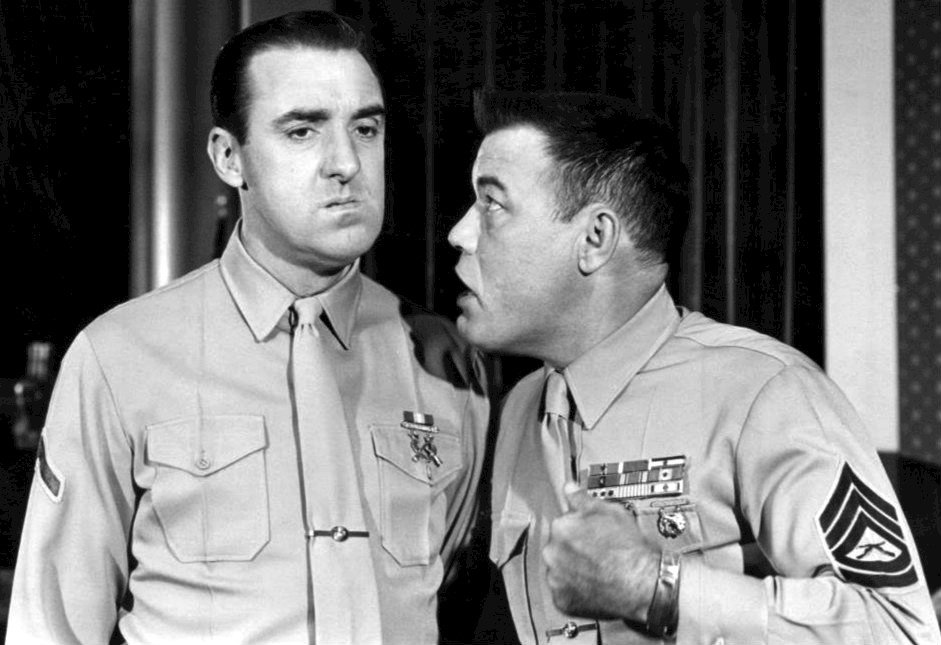
Gomer Pyle (Jim Nabors, left) and Gunnery Sergeant Vince Carter (Frank Sutton, right)

The premise of Gomer Pyle is similar to and perhaps inspired by Andy Griffith's starring role in the Broadway play and film version of No Time for Sergeants, which was based on the Mac Hyman novel of the same title. Like Leonard's other shows, Gomer Pyle was character driven; the main characters were "accessible" and "engaging," and the supporting characters were often eccentric. In the show's pilot episode, Gomer, a gas-station attendant from Mayberry, joins the Marines. Gomer's naïveté immediately exasperates his drill instructor, Gunnery Sergeant Carter (Frank Sutton). The setting was originally Camp Wilson in North Carolina, then moved to the fictional Camp Henderson in California. The show was a fish-out-of-water piece, which, like its contemporary The Beverly Hillbillies, featured rural characters out of their normal settings. Like other comedies of the 1960s, the show avoided political commentary (especially concerning the Vietnam War) and focused instead on the predicaments that ensued from Gomer's unintentional breaking of the rules or sticking his foot in his mouth.

Among the themes explored were the honesty and "strong family values supposedly inherent in small-town life"; according to author Gerard Jones, Gomer Pyle's basic message was "far simpler than any corporate suburban sitcoms with their lessons in compromise and role-following [...] It said merely that the oldest, most basic, least sophisticated sort of sweetness could redeem even the toughest modern types". Author Elizabeth Hirschman noted that Gomer represented a "uniquely American archetype"—a "large, powerful man physically" with the "simple, honest nature of a child or animal". She also noted that, like stories with characters of such an archetype, Gomer's trusting nature was often taken advantage of, though in the end he "reaps happiness" because of his innocence. In his book Watching M*A*S*H, Watching America, media and communications scholar James Wittebols said that Gomer Pyle illustrated how class differences "supposedly negated or diminished by military training" made themselves apparent in the military world.

== Characters ==
Gomer's personality might best be summed up by the words "Aw, shucks."

— The Andy Griffith Show Book

Gomer Pyle (played by Jim Nabors), from Mayberry, North Carolina, is a good-natured and innocent private whose naïveté constantly annoys his drill instructor, Sergeant Carter. Eventually, however, his "unquestioning love and trust of the world" lead those in his platoon to befriend him. His good nature attracts the friendship of women; meanwhile, in so far as Carter's abrasiveness repels women, Gomer is in the position of salvaging numerous social occasions by charming the women whose opinions are important to officers at the Marine base. Gomer was created as a stereotype of a rural American; according to Time, he "wears a gee-whiz expression, spouts homilies out of a lopsided mouth and lopes around uncertainly like a plowboy stepping through a field of cow dung. He is a walking disaster area." Though never promoted beyond private first class during the show's run, Jim Nabors (who played Gomer) was given an honorary promotion to lance corporal in 2001, to corporal in 2007, and then to sergeant in 2013 by the Marines.

Gomer: I'm gonna be a fighting fool, you'll see.
Sergeant Carter: Well, you're halfway there.

— "The Feudin' Pyles"

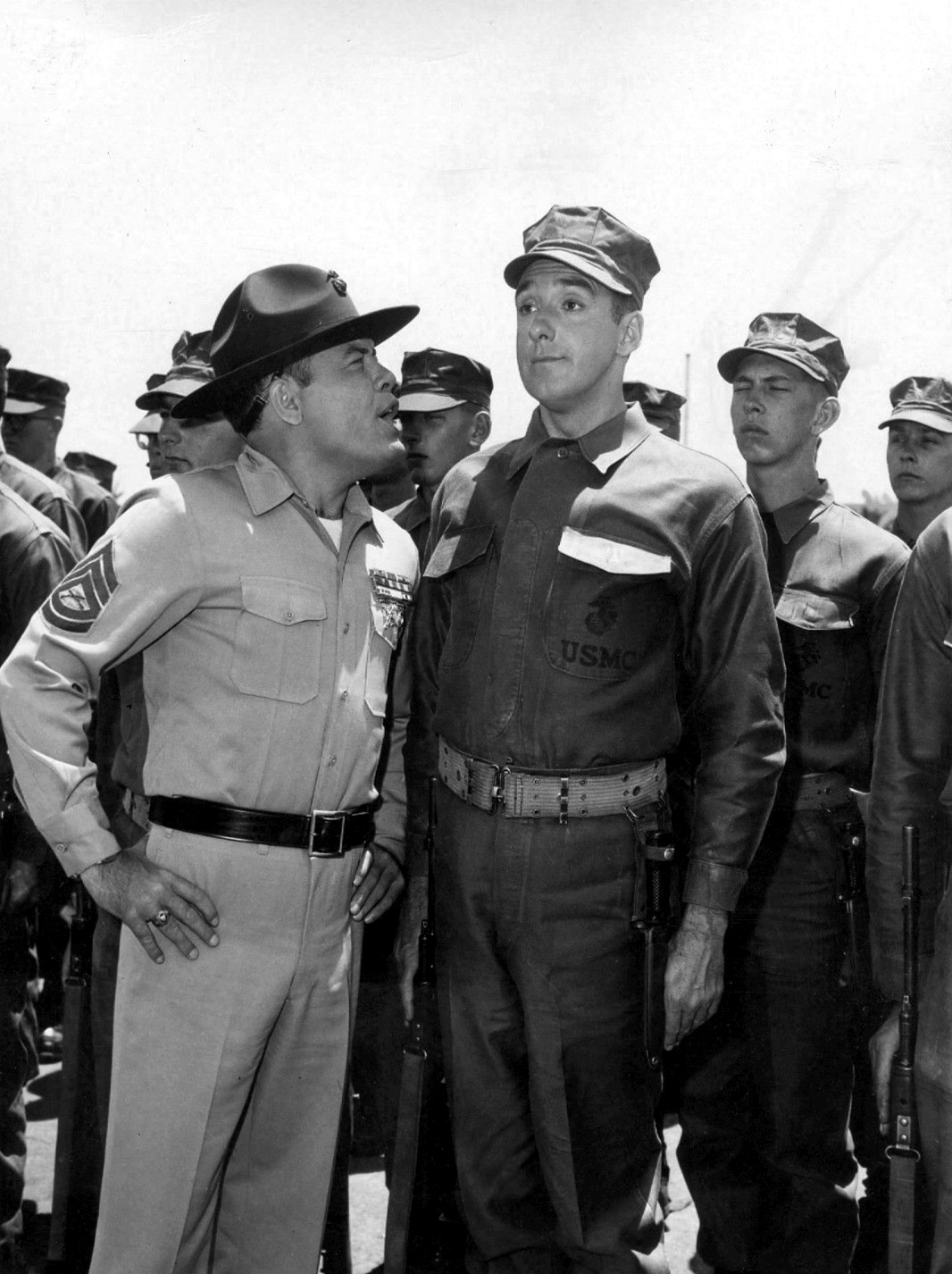
Jim Nabors and Frank Sutton in the Gomer Pyle premiere, 1964

Vince Carter (played by Frank Sutton), a gunnery sergeant from Kansas, is Gomer's irritable, abrasive, and socially inept drill instructor (later his platoon sergeant) who is constantly annoyed by Gomer's well-intentioned mistakes. Carter disdains Gomer's country idiosyncrasies ("golly!" "Shazam!" "surprise, surprise, surprise!"). He is also put off by Gomer's expectation that the platoon should be a family, of which Carter is the father figure: As much as Carter wants their working relationship to be temporary, as is common in the military, Gomer expects a life-long friendship, which exasperates Carter. Due to the audience's demand for more family-oriented programming, he eventually revealed his softer side: Carter became a father figure to Gomer as well as his best friend. Sutton stated that his character was created "out of whole cloth for the show" and, as the actor played him "by ear," Carter greatly changed during the first season. Barbara Stuart played his girlfriend "Miss Bunny" for three seasons.

Mark Slade appeared in eight episodes in 1964 in the role of "Eddie" though in the first of those appearances he was billed as "Private Swanson."

Duke Slater (played by Ronnie Schell) is Gomer's friend and platoon-mate. Schell left the show in the fourth season to star in the short-lived show Good Morning, World but returned in the final season as the corporal of Gomer's platoon.

Chuck Boyle (played by Roy Stuart) is Gomer's corporal. He often serves as Carter's conscience and sticks up for Gomer when Sergeant Carter is annoyed over his mistakes. Stuart debuted in the second season and left the show after the fourth season; Boyle was replaced by Duke Slater as corporal for the final season.

Lou-Ann Poovie (played by Elizabeth MacRae) is Gomer's girlfriend. She debuts in the third season as a singer for a nightclub, but leaves the job at Gomer's urging to return home to Turtle Creek, North Carolina, and marry her beau Monroe Efford. In a later episode in the same season, she returns to California and reveals that she called the wedding off. At the end of the episode, she reveals that she wants Gomer to be her boyfriend, to the dismay of Carter and Duke. After she loses her job at the nightclub, Gomer finds her a job as a salesclerk at a record shop.

== Episodes ==
Season	Episodes	Originally released		Rank	Rating
Season	Episodes	First released	Last released	Rank	Rating
Pilot	1	May 18, 1964		—N/a	—N/a
1	30	September 25, 1964	April 16, 1965	3	30.7
2	30	September 17, 1965	April 15, 1966	2	27.8
3	30	September 14, 1966	April 12, 1967	10	22.8 (Note: Tied with The Virginian, The Lawrence Welk Show, and The Ed Sullivan Show)
4	30	September 8, 1967	April 12, 1968	3	25.6
5	30	September 27, 1968	May 2, 1969	2	27.2

== Production ==
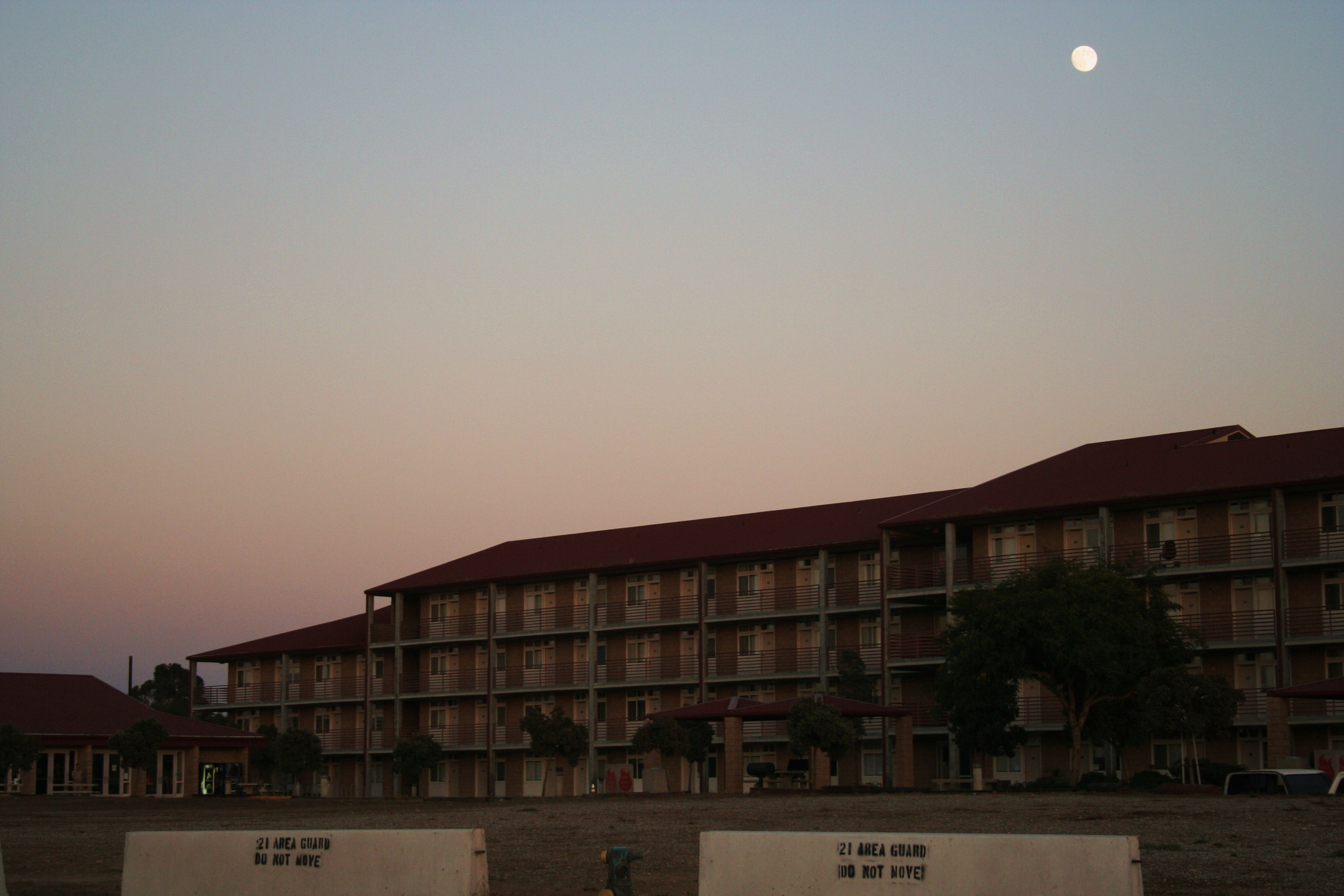
Camp Pendleton: The show was filmed there and at Desilu Studios.

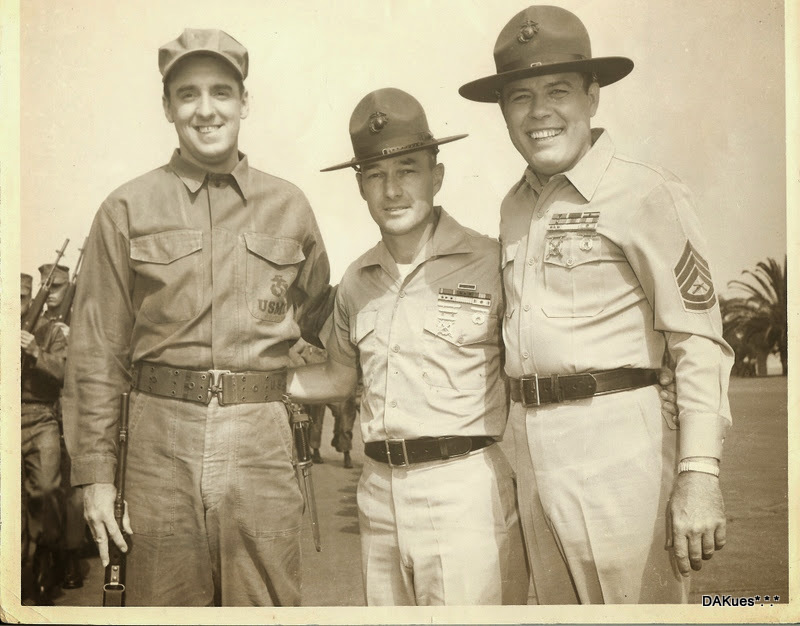
Filming was done at the U.S. Marine Corps Recruit Depot (MCRD) San Diego, California – pictured in the photograph from left to right: Gomer Pyle (Jim Nabors); USMC Representative / MCRD Technical On-Site Advisor (Drill Instructor Edwin J. Kues, USMC); and, Gunnery Sergeant Vince Carter (Frank Sutton). This photo was taken in between filming of the comedy production at MCRD San Diego, California in 1964.

The show was produced by creator Aaron Ruben, Andy Griffith Show producer Sheldon Leonard (in partnership with Griffith), and Ronald Jacobs; it was co-produced by Bruce Bayley Johnson and Duke Vincent. Among the writers were Sam Bobrick, Harvey Miller, Aaron Ruben, Jack Elinson, and Bill Idelson; Andy Griffith Show writers Everett Greenbaum and Jim Fritzell also wrote episodes. Coby Ruskin was the primary director in the first four seasons, before John Rich took over the role for the fifth season; other directors included Gary Nelson, Peter Baldwin, and Alan Rafkin. Ruth Burch was in charge of the casting, and John Finger directed the cinematography. The theme song was composed by Earle Hagen, who also composed the themes for shows such as The Andy Griffith Show, The Dick Van Dyke Show, and That Girl.

The show was filmed at Camp Pendleton, Desilu Studios's Desilu-Cahuenga, and RKO Forty Acres backlot, where The Andy Griffith Show was filmed. Though Ruben preferred the use of a multiple-camera setup for comedy programs, Gomer Pyle used a single-camera setup because much of the shooting was conducted outdoors. In his book And The Show Goes On, Sheldon Leonard explained that the armed forces offer levels of "cooperation" with filmmakers. Because the Marines felt that the show would be good for the branch's image, Gomer Pyle was given "total cooperation," meaning that the show was allowed unlimited access to military equipment.

The vehicles in the show were provided by the Chrysler Corporation, as opposed to the parent series' vehicles that came from the Ford Motor Company. Although Jeeps are also prominent in the show, the brand itself would not become a part of Chrysler until the AMC buyout in 1987.

Nabors and Sutton were the only actors credited in every episode (however, Sutton did not appear in every episode). (Note: Though credited in every episode, Frank Sutton was absent from some of the episodes including "Arrivederci, Gomer", "Corporal Carol", "Gomer and the Queen of Burlesque", and "Love and Goulash".) Ronnie Schell (who played Duke Slater) left after the third season to star in Good Morning World, though he returned for the fifth season, promoted to corporal, after graduating from non-commissioned officer training. Roy Stuart, who played Corporal Chuck Boyle, made his debut in the second season and left after the fourth. Andy Griffith, Frances Bavier, Ron Howard, and George Lindsey made guest appearances on the series reprising their respective roles from The Andy Griffith Show. (Note: As Andy Taylor, Aunt Bee, Opie Taylor, and Goober Pyle, respectively) Denver Pyle and Allan Melvin, who both had roles on The Andy Griffith Show, appeared in Gomer Pyle, but did not reprise their original roles. Denver Pyle, who had played Briscoe Darling in six episodes of The Andy Griffith Show, played tomato farmer Titus Purcell in the Gomer Pyle episode "The Price of Tomatoes." Allan Melvin, who had played Clarence "Doc" Malloy and other antagonists on The Andy Griffith Show, played Sergeant Carter's rival, Staff Sergeant Hacker, for four seasons. Nabors also carried the Gomer Pyle character to fellow CBS series The Lucy Show, in which he made a cameo appearance in a 1966 episode.

Nabors always said he had a hard time watching the show's opening credits, as many of the Marines he was filmed training with were later killed in Vietnam.

== Ratings and timeslots ==
Season	Timeslot	Rank	Rating
1) 1964–65	Friday at 9:30 pm	No. 3	30.7
2) 1965–66	Friday at 9:00 pm	No. 2	27.8
3) 1966–67	Wednesday at 9:30 pm	No. 10	22.8
4) 1967–68	Friday at 8:30 pm	No. 3	25.6
5) 1968–69	Friday at 8:30 pm	No. 2	27.2

== Legacy ==
In the song "Nobody Home" from Pink Floyd's 1979 album The Wall, an audio clip of Pyle saying his signature line "Surprise, surprise, surprise!" can be heard. The audio clip, however, is not present in the 1982 film.

In Gustav Hasford's 1979 novel The Short-Timers, later adapted into Stanley Kubrick's 1987 film Full Metal Jacket, the nickname "Gomer Pyle" is given to Private Leonard Pratt (Leonard Lawrence in the film, played by Vincent D'Onofrio) as a derogatory term during boot camp, after incurring the drill instructor's wrath for being unable to turn off his idiot's grin and his perceived incompetence.

A brief clip of the show airing on American Forces Vietnam Network television appears during the military hospital scene in the 1994 film Forrest Gump. In the scene, Gump is scolded for watching the show by a fellow soldier who calls it "stupid shit".

== In other media ==
E. Kitzes Knox wrote a novel based on the series, also titled Gomer Pyle – USMC The paperback was published by Pyramid and released in 1966. Jim Nabors recorded Shazam!, which is not a soundtrack of the show but features Jim singing novelty songs in his "Gomer" voice, and released it on the Columbia Records label.

A board game was released in 1964 by Transogram.

A trading card set was published by Fleer in 1965.

In April 1994, it was reported that producer Robert N. Fried, who had acquired the rights to Gomer Pyle – USMC from the creators, was in the process of setting up development of a feature film version at Savoy Pictures.

== Home media ==
CBS DVD (distributed by Paramount Home Entertainment) has released all five seasons of Gomer Pyle – USMC on DVD in Region 1. All episodes have been digitally remastered, but due to clearance issues, some episodes that feature Nabors (and other cast members) singing have been edited to remove those performances.

On March 10, 2015, CBS DVD (distributed by Paramount) released Gomer Pyle – USMC- The Complete series on DVD in Region 1.

In Region 4, Shock Entertainment has released all five seasons on DVD in Australia.

DVD Name	Ep #	Release dates	
DVD Name	Ep #	Region 1	Region 4
The Complete First Season	30	December 12, 2006	November 12, 2009
The Complete Second Season	30	June 26, 2007	March 10, 2010
The Complete Third Season	30	December 11, 2007	May 12, 2010
The Complete Fourth Season	30	May 20, 2008	August 11, 2010
The Complete Fifth and Final Season	30	November 25, 2008	April 13, 2011
The Complete Series	150	March 10, 2015	November 10, 2010 November 4, 2015 (Repackaged)

== General bibliography ==
- Beck, Ken; Clark, Jim (2000). The Andy Griffith Show Book: From Miracle Salve to Kerosene Cucumbers : the Complete Guide to One of Television's Best-loved Shows. Macmillan Publishers. pp. 86–88. ISBN 978-0-312-26287-7.
- Browne, Pat (2001). The Guide to United States Popular Culture. University of Wisconsin Press. ISBN 978-0-87972-821-2.
- Erickson, Hal (1998). Sid and Marty Krofft: A Critical Study of Saturday Morning Children's Television, 1969–1993. McFarland. ISBN 978-0-7864-0518-3.
- Farber, David; Bailey, Beth (2003). The Columbia Guide to America in the 1960s. Columbia University Press. ISBN 978-0-231-11373-1.
- Hirschman, Elizabeth (2000). Heroes, Monsters & Messiahs: Movies and Television Shows as the Mythology of American Culture. Andrews McMeel Publishing. ISBN 978-0-7407-0485-7.
- Hyatt, Wesley (2004). A Critical History of Television's The Red Skelton Show, 1951–1971. McFarland. ISBN 978-0-7864-1732-2.
- Jackson, Kenneth T.; Markoe, Karen; Markoe, Arnie (1998). The Scribner Encyclopedia of American Lives: 1997–1999. Simon & Schuster. ISBN 978-0-684-80663-1.
- Jones, Gerard (1993). Honey, I'm Home!: Sitcoms, Selling the American Dream. Macmillan Publishers. ISBN 978-0-312-08810-1.
- Kane, Arnold (2008). My Meteoric Rise to Obscurity. Cover design by Gromis, Sally. We Publish Books. ISBN 978-1-929841-49-3.
- Kelly, Richard (1985). The Andy Griffith Show. John F. Blair. ISBN 0-89587-043-6.
- Knox, E. Kitz (1966). Gomer Pyle – USMC. Pyramid.
- Leonard, Sheldon; Griffith, Andy (1995). And the Show Goes on: Broadway and Hollywood Adventures. Hal Leonard. ISBN 978-0-87910-184-8.
- Marc, David (1989). Comic Visions: Television Comedy and American Culture. Wiley-Blackwell. ISBN 978-0-04-445284-3.
- Marc, David; Thompson, Robert J. (2004). Television in the Antenna Age: A Concise History. Blackwell Publishing. ISBN 978-0-631-21544-8.
- Moore, Barbara; Bensman, Marvin R.; Van Dyke, Jim (2006). Prime-Time Television: A Concise History. Greenwood Publishing Group. ISBN 978-0-275-98142-6.
- Newcomb, Horace (2004). Encyclopedia of Television. Museum of Broadcast Communications. CRC Press. ISBN 978-1-57958-411-5.
- Olson, James Stuart (1990). Historical Dictionary of the 1960s. Greenwood Publishing Group. ISBN 978-0-313-29271-2.
- Roman, James W. (2005). From Daytime to Primetime: The History of American Television Programs. Greenwood Publishing Group. ISBN 978-0-313-31972-3.
- "Television". The New York Times Guide to Essential Knowledge: A Desk Reference for the Curious Mind. Macmillan Publishers. 2004. pp. 418–419. ISBN 978-0-312-31367-8.
- Davis, Walter; Blythe, Teresa; Dreibelbis, Gary; Scalese, Mark; Winans, Elizabeth (2001). Watching What We Watch: Prime-time Television Through the Lens of Faith. Westminster John Knox Press. ISBN 978-0-664-22696-1.
- Wittebols, James H. (2003). Watching M*A*S*H, Watching America: A Social History of the 1972–1983 Television Series. McFarland. ISBN 978-0-7864-1701-8.
