= Ronnie Schell =

American actor (1931–2026)

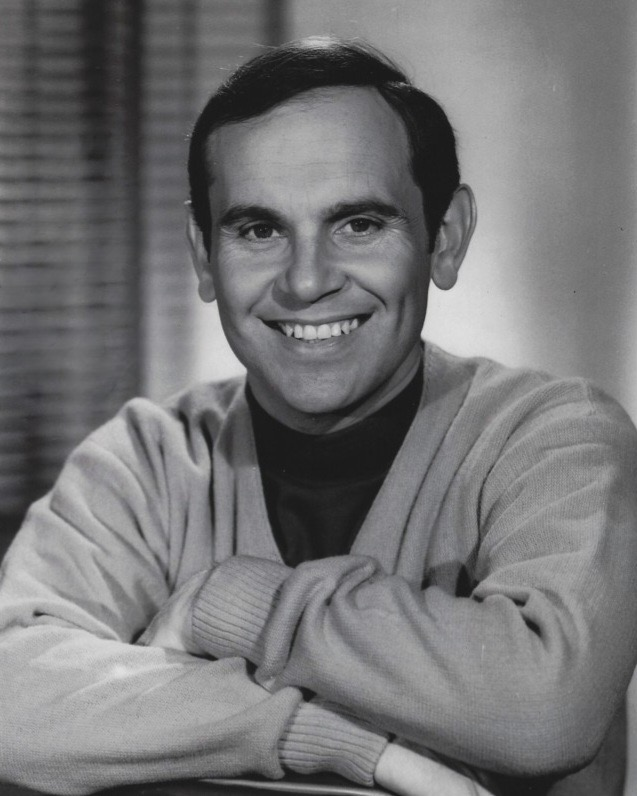
- Schell in Good Morning World, 1967
- Born: Ronald Ralph Schell; December 23, 1931; Richmond, California, U.S.
- Died: June 12, 2026 (aged 94); Los Angeles, California, U.S.
- Occupations: Actor; comedian
- Years active: 1958–2022
- Spouse: Janet Rodeberg (m. 1968)
- Children: 2

Ronald Ralph Schell (December 23, 1931 – June 12, 2026) was an American actor and stand-up comedian. He appeared on the May 28, 1959, episode of the TV quiz show You Bet Your Life, hosted by Groucho Marx. Schell demonstrated a comic barrage of beatnik jive talk. As a stand-up comedian, he first developed his act at the hungry i nightclub in San Francisco, California, and is heard (presumably as the opening act) introducing the Kingston Trio at the start of the group's 1962 College Concert album. Schell is probably best known for his 1960s television role as Duke Slater in Gomer Pyle – USMC.

== Early life ==
Schell was born in Richmond, California, on December 23, 1931. Upon graduation from high school, he served four years in the United States Air Force, where he became an airman first class.

== Career ==
For three seasons, Schell portrayed Marine private Duke Slater, best friend to Gomer Pyle on Gomer Pyle – USMC. Schell left during the fourth season to star as a disc jockey in his own sitcom, Good Morning World; he returned to Gomer Pyle for its fifth and final season. Promoted to a corporal, the character of Slater now acted more as a mediator between Pyle and Sgt. Carter (portrayed by Frank Sutton), than as a buddy to Pyle.

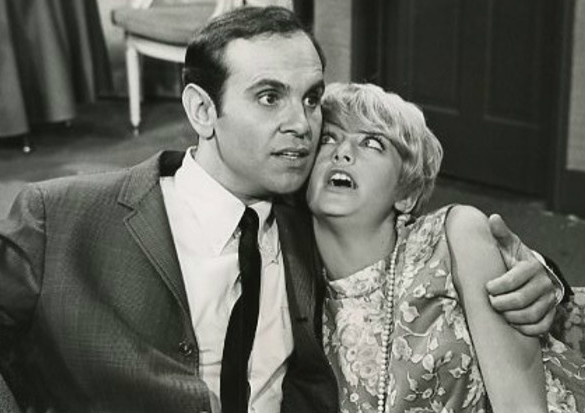
Ronnie Schell and Goldie Hawn in Good Morning World (1967)

Schell lent his voice to "Jason" on the animated series Battle of the Planets and co-starred as "Mr. Brown" on The Mouseketeers at Walt Disney World episode of The Wonderful World of Disney.

His other television guest credits include The Andy Griffith Show; The Patty Duke Show; Phil of the Future; Yes, Dear; The Wayans Bros.; Step by Step; Coach; The Golden Girls; 227; Saved by the Bell; Empty Nest; Mr. Belvedere; Santa Barbara; Trapper John, M.D.; Too Close for Comfort; The Brian Keith Show; The New Temperatures Rising Show; The Love Boat; Love, American Style; Alice, Mork & Mindy; One Day at a Time, Charlie's Angels; The Dukes of Hazzard; Sanford and Son; Emergency!; Happy Days; Adam-12; The New Dick Van Dyke Show; That Girl; Black Sheep Squadron; and Jessie.

Schell's gradual ascendency into the public's attention earned him the title "America's Slowest Rising Comedian".

He also acted in a few Pacific Southwest Airlines (PSA) commercials such as "Smile Inspection" and "PSA Gives You A Lift Pageant". At the end of a Jerry Lewis PSA jingle, a voice said "That was Jerry Lewis for PSA, and this is Ronnie Schell. What did I do wrong?" Schell was the voice for the hockey puck-shaped character on the Peter Puck cartoons, which aired during televised National Hockey League games in the 1970s. From the mid to late 1980s, Schell appeared in numerous television commercials for Shakey's Pizza.

In 2007, Schell was part of a touring cabaret show titled, 5 Star Revue with Gary Collins, Mary Ann Mobley, Ruta Lee, and Steve Rossi. He starred in the 2009 off-Broadway production of Don't Leave it All to Your Children!, a comedic and musical revue dedicated to aging baby boomers.

Schell was the comedy advisor to Richard Dreyfuss in the 2019 Netflix film The Last Laugh.

== Personal life and death ==
Schell married Janet Rodeberg in 1968; they had two sons, Greg and Chris Schell.

Schell died at the Ronald Reagan UCLA Medical Center in Los Angeles, on June 12, 2026, at the age of 94.

== Filmography ==
=== Film ===
Year	Title	Role	Notes
1975	The Strongest Man in the World	Referee	
1976	Gus	Joe Barnsdale	
1976	The Shaggy D.A.	TV Director	
1978	The Cat from Outer Space	Jake / Sgt. Duffy	Voice
1979	Love at First Bite	Guy in Elevator	
1980	How to Beat the High Cost of Living	Bill Pike	
1981	The Devil and Max Devlin	Greg Weems	
1986	The Check Is in the Mail...	Dr. Brannigan	
1987	Dutch Treat	Lou Winters	
1987	Ultraman: The Adventure Begins	Samson	Voice; credited as Ronald Schell
1990	Jetsons: The Movie	Rudy 2	Voice
1991	Rover Dangerfield	Eddie	Voice
1993	Fatal Instinct	Conductor	
1993	Dorf Goes Fishing	DIP Host	Direct-to-video
1994	Revenge of the Red Baron	Lou	
1997	The Good Bad Guy	Chief Harrison	
1997	Venus Envy	Simon Sayes	
2000	Family Jewels	Bill Taller	
2000	The View from the Swing	Man in Diner	
2001	Recess Christmas: Miracle on Third Street	Mayor Fitzhugh	Voice, direct-to-video
2002	The Biggest Fan	Mr. Wastedberg	
2006	Pennies	Mr. Tinker	Short film
2010	Soupernatural	Bob	
2017	The Candle	Grandpa Joe	Short film

=== Television ===
Year	Title	Role	Notes
1964–1969	Gomer Pyle – USMC	Duke Slater	Main cast, 92 episodes
1967–1968	Good Morning World	Larry Clarke	Main cast, 26 episodes
1973	Butch Cassidy	Additional voices	13 episodes
1973	Goober and the Ghost Chasers	Gilly	Voice, 16 episodes
1973	Peter Puck	Peter Puck	Voice, 9 episodes
1973–1974	Wait Till Your Father Gets Home	Additional voices	3 episodes
1973–1976	Emergency!	Various roles	4 episodes: S3Ep8, S4Ep20, S5Ep16, S6Ep4
1974	Adam-12	Jack	S7E1: "Camp"
1976	Sanford and Son	Mr. Wilkens	Episode: "Committee Man"
1977	The Skatebirds	Additional voices	16 episodes
1977	The Wonderful World of Disney	Mr. Brown	Episode: "The Mouseketeers at Walt Disney World"
1977–1978	Fred Flintstone and Friends	Gilly	Voice, 95 episodes (Goober and the Ghost Chasers segments)
1977–1979	Alice	Buck / Ken Baldwin	2 episodes ("Mel's Happy Burger" / "Mel's in the Kitchen with Dinah")
1977–1980	Captain Caveman and the Teen Angels	Additional voices	39 episodes
1978	Battle of the Planets	Jason / Additional voices	85 episodes
1978	Yogi's Space Race	Additional voices	13 episodes
1979	Casper and the Angels	Additional voices	Episode: "Love at First Fright/Saving Grace in Outer Space"
1982	Jokebook	Additional voices	3 episodes
1982	Madame's Place	Frederico Felluci	Episode: "I Am What I Am"
1982–1983	Meatballs & Spaghetti	Additional voices	25 episodes
1982–1983	Shirt Tales	Rick Raccoon	Voice, main role (23 episodes)
1982–1988	The Smurfs	Pushover Smurf / Reporter Smurf / Additional voices	8 episodes
1985	Snorks	Additional voices	Episode: "Snorkitis is Nothing to Sneeze At/The Whole Toot and Nothing But"
1986	Sledge Hammer!	Phil Gumm	1 episode, Hammer Gets Nailed
1986	Pound Puppies	Buster / Mr. Hubert	Voice, 2 episodes
1986–1988	The Flintstone Kids	Yuckster	Voice, 4 episodes
1987	Scooby-Doo Meets the Boo Brothers	Freako / Demonstrator Ghost	Voice, television film
1987	DuckTales	Ping the Pitiless	Episode: "The Right Duck"
1988	Scooby-Doo and the Ghoul School	Colonel Calloway	Voice, television film
1988	Mr. Belvedere	Contest Judge	Episode: "Marsha's Secret"
1988–1989	Fantastic Max	Additional voices	3 episodes
1989	A Pup Named Scooby-Doo	Additional voices	8 episodes
1989	Saved by the Bell	Principal Elliot Stingwell	Episode: "Save That Tiger"
1990	The Golden Girls	Thomas	Episode: "Triple Play"
1990	Midnight Patrol: Adventures in the Dream Zone	Additional voices	13 episodes
1991	Out of This World	Pinky Starr	Episode: "Mayor Evie"
1991	Yo Yogi!	Calvin Klunk	Voice, 9 episodes
1992	The Legend of Prince Valiant	Master Fezzick	Voice, 2 episodes
1992	Tom & Jerry Kids	Additional voices	Episode: "Penthouse Mouse/12 Angry Sheep/The Ant Attack"
1992	Rugrats	Fish / Clerk	Voice, episode: "Visitors from Outer Space/The Case of the Missing Rugrat"; credited as Ronald Schell
1992	Duckman	Eric Duckman	Voice, unaired pilot: "The Case of the Missing Chromosome"
1993	I Yabba-Dabba Do!	Additional voices	Television film
1993	Droopy, Master Detective	Additional voices	13 episodes
1993	Hollyrock-a-Bye Baby	Additional voices	Television film
1995–1996	Coach	Dr. Howard / Customer	2 episodes
1997	What a Cartoon!	Mel	Voice, episode: "Strange Things"
1997–1999	Recess	Mayor Fitzhugh	Voice, 3 episodes
2004	Yes, Dear	Cliff Marshall	Episode: "Dead Aunt, Dead Aunt"
2004	Phil of the Future	75-Year-Old Phil	Episode: "Age Before Beauty"
2004	Megas XLR	Mac	Voice, 2 episodes
2004, 2007	The Grim Adventures of Billy & Mandy	Real Estate Agent / Toadblatt	Voice, 2 episodes
2008	Easy to Assemble	Ronnie Schell	2 episodes
2011	Jessie	Ranger Bill	Episode: "Zuri's New Old Friend"
2012	Retired at 35	Sal	Episode: "Poker Face"
2014–2015	You'll Be Fine	Harry	3 episodes
2017	Heaven's Waiting Room	Vic	Unknown episodes
2018	Kaplan's Corner	Ronnie (final role)	Episode: "Marvin's Ghost"
