= List of That Girl episodes =

That Girl is an American television sitcom that ran on ABC from September 8, 1966, to March 19, 1971. The series is currently available on DVD.

During the course of the series, 136 episodes of That Girl aired over five seasons.

== Series overview ==
Season	Episodes	Originally released		Rank
Season	Episodes	First released	Last released	Rank
Pilot		April 29, 1996 (on TV Land)		TBA
1	30	September 8, 1966	April 6, 1967	57
2	30	September 7, 1967	April 25, 1968	TBA
3	26	September 26, 1968	March 27, 1969	44
4	26	September 18, 1969	March 26, 1970	48
5	24	September 25, 1970	March 19, 1971	TBA

== Episodes ==
=== Pilot ===
Title	Directed by	Written by	Original release date
"What's In a Name?"	Jerry Paris	Bill Persky & Sam Denoff	April 29, 1996 (on TV Land)
Aspiring New York City actress Ann Marie faces a dilemma when her agent/boyfriend Don Blue Sky (Ted Bessell) urges her to get a stage name, much to the chagrin of her parents (Harold Gould and Penny Santon). Note The copyright date was in 1965. The first television airing was on the premiere night of TV Land on April 29, 1996.

=== Season 1 (1966–67) ===
No. overall	No. in season	Title	Directed by	Written by	Original release date	Prod. code
1	1	"Don't Just Do Something, Stand There"	Bob Sweeney	Jim Parker & Arnold Margolin	September 8, 1966	5
Aspiring actress Ann Marie is working at a newsstand in an office building, where she meets Donald Hollinger (Ted Bessell), a writer for Newsview magazine. Ann is cast in a television commercial filming in the lobby of the office building, but an encounter with the chivalrous Donald may end her job.
2	2	"Good-bye, Hello, Good-bye"	Bob Sweeney	Bill Persky & Sam Denoff	September 15, 1966	6
Ann Marie leaves her home in Brewster, New York and moves to New York City to pursue her acting career. Her agent Harvey Peck (Ronnie Schell) helps her find an apartment, much to her father's (Lew Parker) chagrin. Ann meets her new neighbor, Judy Bessemer (Bonnie Scott), and her independence is tested when her mother, Helen (Rosemary DeCamp) moves in after an argument with Ann's father, Lew. The only decent paying acting gig Ann lands is as a mop on a children's show. Absent: Ted Bessell as Donald
3	3	"Never Change a Diaper on Opening Night"	Bob Sweeney	Milton Pascal	September 22, 1966	3
Ann agrees to babysit for her neighbor Judy, who assures her that she will be back long before Ann's acting workshop audition. Judy gets stuck at her sister's house and her obstetrician husband, Leon, gets called to deliver a baby, forcing Ann to take infant Stanley along on her audition. The workshop director (Billy DeWolfe) is very no-nonsense and dislikes babies. Absent: Ted Bessell as Donald
4	4	"I'll Be Suing You"	Bob Sweeney	Peggy Elliott & Ed Scharlach	September 29, 1966	2
When Ann borrows Donald's car, a sewing machine salesman (Carl Ballantine) is distracted by a pretty girl and bumps into the car, then sues her for damages.
5	5	"Anatomy of a Blunder"	Bob Sweeney	Dale McRaven & Carl Kleinschmitt	October 6, 1966	4
Ann talks Don into driving to Brewster so she can pick up her old hi-fi system, which leads to an on-the-road picnic disaster.
6	6	"Rich Little Rich Kid"	Sidney Miller	Joseph Bonaduce	October 13, 1966	7
While paying a parking ticket, Ann meets a rich young man (Sam Melville) who invests in the theater and tries to seduce her, much to Don's annoyance.
7	7	"Help Wanted"	Bob Sweeney	Tom & Helen August	October 20, 1966	9
When Donald's secretary goes on maternity leave, Judy suggests hiring Ann as a temp.
8	8	"Little Auction Annie"	Sidney Miller	Rick Mittleman	October 27, 1966	8
At an auction, Ann successfully bids on a box filled with various items. One item draws the attention of a mysterious stranger (Michael Conrad).
9	9	"Time for Arrest"	David McDearmon	Jack Winter	November 3, 1966	12
Ann lands in jail wearing a cave-girl outfit, after replacing her neighbor and fellow actress Margie (Jackie Joseph) on a side gig that turns out to be a catering job for a Mafia boss seeking to merge with a rival family.
10	10	"Break a Leg"	Jerry Davis	Jim Parker & Arnold Margolin	November 10, 1966	1
Ann's actress friend, Sandy Stafford (Sally Kellerman), lands a role in a Broadway play, and asks Ann to be her understudy. While staying with her, Sandy contracts the measles, and Ann has to perform. George Carlin has a small role as Ann's agent, George. Absent: Ted Bessell as Donald
11	11	"What's in a Name?"	Harry Falk	Bill Persky & Sam Denoff	November 17, 1966	11
After Ann's agent (Ronnie Schell) suggests she adopt a more suitable stage name, Ann's attempts are met with her parents' strong disapproval. The recycled version of the original pilot episode.
12	12	"Soap Gets in Your Eyes"	Seymour Robbie	Tom & Helen August	November 24, 1966	13
Ann's role as a villainess in a soap opera compromises a potential relationship with Don's mother (Mabel Albertson). Ann hopes a visit from the actor playing the hero will improve her image.
13	13	"All About Ann"	John Erman	Milton Pascal	December 1, 1966	14
Donald works with an actress in Ann's acting workshop to write an article about her, leading Ann to suspect he is having an affair. Rob Reiner has a small role.
14	14	"Phantom of the Horse Opera"	John Erman	Peggy Elliott & Ed Scharlach	December 8, 1966	15
Ann thinks her apartment building is being "haunted" by a silent movie theatre organist (Sterling Holloway).
15	15	"Beware of Actors Bearing Gifts"	Bob Sweeney	Richard Baer	December 15, 1966	10
A member of Ann's acting workshop tries to buy her friendship.
16	16	"Christmas and the Hard-Luck Kid"	John Erman	James L. Brooks	December 22, 1966	18
As her shift as a department store Christmas elf concludes, Ann tells Donald about her stint as a teacher in a boarding school trying to bring good tidings and joy to a boy who was unable to go home for Christmas. John Fiedler guest stars.
17	17	"Among My Souvenirs"	Seymour Robbie	Peggy Elliott & Ed Scharlach	January 5, 1967	16
While sifting through boxes of her personal items, Ann finds a ring that a now-married high school sweetheart gave her. She attempts to return it to him.
18	18	"These Boots Weren't Made for Walking"	John Erman	Peggy Elliott & Ed Scharlach	January 12, 1967	17
Seeking a job that gives her more time for auditions, Ann tries her luck as a door-to-door shoe salesperson. Her boss (Paul Lynde) neglects to mention the shoes are poorly constructed and, in fact, are made entirely from cardboard.
19	19	"Kimono My House"	John Erman	Peggy Elliott & Ed Scharlach	January 19, 1967	20
When Ann sees how messy Don's apartment is, she hires a Japanese maid to clean the place. She soon suspects the girl has other intentions.
20	20	"Gone with the Breeze"	John Erman	Tom & Helen August	January 26, 1967	19
After Donald gives Ann the manuscript of his novel, she is convinced she has lost it.
21	21	"Rain, Snow and Rice"	John Erman	James L. Brooks	February 2, 1967	21
At the Baumans' wedding in Connecticut, a snowstorm prevents Ann and Don from returning to New York. The hotel only has one additional room available, so Don and Ann agree to share it so the Baumans can have their wedding night. Meanwhile, Ann's parents think she and Don have eloped, and they drive to Connecticut. Ann has to convince them that she and Don platonically shared the room.
22	22	"Paper Hats and Everything"	John Erman	Sydney Zelinka	February 9, 1967	22
While Ann suspects a dinner date with her father is really a ruse for a surprise birthday party, Judy assembles one on short notice just in case it is not. Richard Dreyfuss guest-stars.
23	23	"What Are Your Intentions?"	John Erman	Milton Pascal	February 16, 1967	23
Ann's father presses Donald as to whether he intends to marry his daughter.
24	24	"A Tenor's Loving Care"	John Erman	Joseph Bonaduce	February 23, 1967	24
A famous opera singer (Carroll O'Connor) makes a play for Ann while Don tries to get an interview with the temperamental celebrity.
25	25	"Leaving the Nest Is for the Birds"	Hal Cooper	Barbara Avedon	March 2, 1967	25
Ann's family dinner to prove to her parents that living in New York City is safe is spoiled by an alleged peeping Tom (Jerry Van Dyke).
26	26	"You Have to Know Someone to Be Unknown"	Jerrold Bernstein	Saul Turteltaub & Bernie Orenstein	March 9, 1967	26
Finding out that Broadway producer Harold J. Davis (Herbert Rudley) is seeking a fresh-faced unknown for his next play, Ann goes overboard to get noticed, and even has Donald put a good word in for her.
27	27	"The Honeymoon Apartment"	Hal Cooper	Austin & Irma Kalish	March 16, 1967	27
Ann's cheapskate cousin (Warren Berlinger) arrives with his new bride, then attempts to stay at her apartment for their honeymoon rather go to a hotel.
28	28	"This Little Piggy Had a Ball"	Hal Cooper	Arnold Margolin & Jim Parker	March 23, 1967	28
While bowling with Donald just before she is to accept an award for another actress, Ann reads about another bowler who bowled with his toes. She then makes the mistake of trying to do it herself. Rob Reiner & Teri Garr make appearances. Garr and series star Marlo Thomas would later guest star years later on Friends as the mothers of Phoebe and Rachel respectively.
29	29	"Author, Author"	Danny Arnold	Ronald Axe & Howard Harris	March 30, 1967	29
Ann, needing a comedic line for an upcoming audition, seeks help from both Donald and a washed-up comedy writer, neither of which proves adequate.
30	30	"The Mating Game"	Hal Cooper	Treva Silverman & Peter Meyerson	April 6, 1967	30
While working on an exposé on the inner workings of a TV game show called The Mating Game, Donald has Ann go undercover as the bachelorette who selects a date. Unknown to her, he is one of the three unseen bachelors she must choose from.

=== Season 2 (1967–68) ===
No. overall	No. in season	Title	Directed by	Written by	Original release date	Prod. code
31	1	"Pass the Potatoes, Ethel Merman"	James Frawley	James L. Brooks	September 7, 1967	37
A walk on role for a play starring Ethel Merman in a revival of Gypsy leaves Ann awestruck.
32	2	"The Good Skate"	Jeffrey Hayden	Tom & Helen August	September 14, 1967	33
Ann auditions for a soda commercial that requires a performance on roller skates, something she has a little difficulty with.
33	3	"Black, White and Read All Over"	Jeffrey Hayden	Richard Baer	September 21, 1967	34
After yet another rejection of Donald's unpublished novel, Ann offers to submit it to her father, who knows a publisher who's a customer at his restaurant. Unfortunately he takes a look at it himself, and nearly equates it with pornography.
34	4	"To Each Her Own"	James Sheldon	Stanley Ralph Ross	September 28, 1967	36
Donald does a news story on computer dating, and takes Ann along for the ride. Much to Ann's chagrin, the girl that the computer dating service assigns to her boyfriend, is a lot like her.
35	5	"The Apartment"	Danny Arnold	Ruth Brooks Flippen	October 5, 1967	39
Donald gets Ann to house sit at his apartment, and she runs into another friend of his (Bill Bixby), who is also staying there.
36	6	"Absence Makes the Heart Grow Nervous"	Danny Arnold	Arnold Margolin & Jim Parker	October 12, 1967	31
Before Ann goes to Philadelphia for a play that's making a nationwide tour, Donald tries to show her a good time by giving her a night on the town... and another night, and another night,...
37	7	"The Philadelphia Story"	Danny Arnold	Arnold Margolin & Jim Parker	October 19, 1967	32
Unable to tolerate life without Ann, Donald goes to Philadelphia to write a review of Ann's play.
38	8	"There's Nothing to Be Afreud of But Freud Himself"	Hal Cooper	Milton Pascal	October 26, 1967	43
Donald writes an article on a newfangled psychological exam, and tries to use it on Ann and the Baumans... with predictably traumatic results.
39	9	"The Collaborators"	Bruce Bilson	Ruth Brooks Flippen	November 2, 1967	42
Ann and Donald decide to work on a play about her life, but creative differences get in the way.
40	10	"When in Rome"	Hal Cooper	Saul Turteltaub & Bernie Orenstein	November 9, 1967	44
An Italian movie director spots Ann and wants her to star in his next movie... and perform a nude scene.
41	11	"Thanksgiving Comes But Once a Year, Thankfully"	James Sheldon	Peggy Elliott	November 23, 1967	35
Ann struggles to cook everybody's favorite dishes for a Thanksgiving dinner. Note: This episode is called "Thanksgiving Comes But Once a Year, Hopefully" on the DVDs.
42	12	"The Mailman Cometh"	James Sheldon	Danny Arnold and Ruth Brooks Flippen	November 30, 1967	46
A substitute agent sets Ann up on a publicity date with Dick Shawn who knows nothing about it.
43	13	"It's a Mod, Mod World" (Part 1)	James Frawley	Tom & Helen August	December 7, 1967	40
Originally doubting the intentions of a photographer, Ann is convinced (thanks to Donald) that she should take a job as a model for him because he's a legitimate photographer named Noel Prince. But when Prince flies her out to California, he realizes he intends to keep her.
44	14	"It's a Mod, Mod World" (Part 2)	James Frawley	Tom & Helen August	December 14, 1967	41
Donald is on the edge over Ann's time with Noel Prince, despite her assurances she has no interest in her new boss.
45	15	"'Twas the Night Before Christmas, You're Under Arrest"	James Sheldon	Ruth Brooks Flippen	December 21, 1967	47
After buying theater tickets from a scalper as a Christmas present for the Baumans, and learning from Don that some scalpers use personal information to burglarize their customers, Ann coaxes Donald to help her hide the Baumans' presents, only for both to be accused of burglary themselves.
46	16	"A Friend in Need"	Hal Cooper	Richard Baer	December 28, 1967	45
After Ann is injured on a movie set, Donald goes overboard in trying to take care of her.
47	17	"Fur All We Know"	Hal Cooper	Peggy Elliott & Ed Scharlach	January 4, 1968	48
After Ann models an expensive chinchilla stole, the owner insists that she borrow it as she accompanies Don to a party for the wealthy jet set, where a gigolo mistakes Ann for a wealthy heiress.
48	18	"The Rivals"	Hal Cooper	Richard Baer	January 11, 1968	49
Another family visit to Ann's parents in Brewster pits Donald against Lou when Lou runs a stop sign and crashes into Donald's car.
49	19	"Sixty-Five on the Aisle"	James Frawley	Ruth Brooks Flippen	January 18, 1968	38
Lou Marie buys theater and train tickets for sixty-five people from Brewster to see Ann in a play. A conflict arises between the producers who do not want them leaving the theater during an important scene and Ann's official debut that causes them to keep changing their schedule.
50	20	"Call of the Wild"	Hal Cooper	Milton Pascal	January 25, 1968	50
When Ann gets a soap commercial, the director tells her that it's because she has a face that no housewife would feel threatened by, which makes her wonder if she has any sex appeal.
51	21	"The Other Woman"	Andrew McCullough	Richard Baer	February 1, 1968	51
Ann suggests that her father escort Ethel Merman to a formal event, and the tabloids make him look like her new boyfriend, which doesn't exactly please her mother.
52	22	"He and She and He"	Norman Hall	Saul Turteltaub & Bernie Orenstein	February 8, 1968	52
Still obsessed with Ann, Noel Prince returns to New York to try to get her to marry him.
53	23	"Odpdypahimcaifss" "Oh, Don, Poor Don, Your Pants Are Hanging in My Closet and I'm Feeling So Sad"	Hal Cooper	Richard Baer	February 22, 1968	53
A scandal erupts when Donald's mother is invited to Ann's place and finds his pants in her closet.
54	24	"Great Guy"	John Rich	Story by : Ruth Brooks Flippen and Danny Arnold; Teleplay by : Bruce Howard	March 7, 1968	54
Ann is worried about Pete's new boyfriend George (Albert Salmi), a jock who doesn't necessarily treat her like a lady.
55	25	"The Detective Story"	Hal Cooper	Carl Kleinschmitt	March 14, 1968	55
A series of obscene phone calls prompts Ann to call the NYPD, who sends over a detective who seems to be getting a little too close for comfort, especially Donald's.
56	26	"If You Were Almost the Only Man in the World"	Hal Cooper	Danny Arnold and Ruth Brooks Flippen	March 21, 1968	56
After being hit by a fly ball at a baseball game, Ann meets a doctor who bears a striking resemblance to Donald (Ted Bessell playing dual roles).
57	27	"Just Spell the Name Right"	John Rich	Richard Baer	March 28, 1968	57
Ann hires press agent Eddie Edwards (Jesse White) to boost her career, but his method of doing so involves naming her in the divorce of one of her former soap opera co-stars Buddy Hobart (Robert Alda).
58	28	"The Beard"	James Frawley	Richard Baer	April 11, 1968	58
After a hunting trip, Donald decides to grow a beard, which doesn't necessarily turn Ann on.
59	29	"The Drunkard"	Hal Cooper	Danny Arnold and Ruth Brooks Flippen	April 18, 1968	59
Ann helps sober up a comedian who thinks that they had an affair. Sid Caesar guest stars.
60	30	"Old Man's Darling"	John Rich	Richard Baer	April 25, 1968	60
An elderly man, who just happens to be one of the 10 richest people in America, ruins Ann's new dress but tries to make up for the mishap by buying her expensive gifts which she feels that she cannot accept.

=== Season 3 (1968–69) ===
No. overall	No. in season	Title	Directed by	Written by	Original release date	Prod. code
61	1	"Sock It to Me"	James Sheldon	Stan Cutler & Martin Donovan	September 26, 1968	71
Ann's opportunity to perform in a Broadway play opposite Barry Sullivan is jeopardized by her inability to slap him.
62	2	"The Hi-Jack and The Mighty"	John Rich	Ruth Brooks Flippen	October 3, 1968	61
While working as a flight attendant in order to land a job on an airline television commercial, Ann mistakes a private investigator for a hijacker.
63	3	"Eleven Angry Men and That Girl"	Hal Cooper	Stan Cutler & Martin Donovan	October 10, 1968	64
Ann is selected for jury duty. Stuart Margolin guest stars.
64	4	"7¼" (Part 1)	Hal Cooper	Arthur Julian	October 17, 1968	66
Ann flies to Los Angeles for a series of TV commercial along with Donald, who tags along to do a magazine story about violence in the entertainment industry.
65	5	"7¼" (Part 2)	Hal Cooper	Arthur Julian	October 24, 1968	67
Ann's commercial work proves to be more grueling than she could possibly have expected. Stuart Margolin guest stars.
66	6	"Secret Ballot"	John Rich	Richard Baer	October 31, 1968	62
Ann gets excited about voting in her first presidential election, learns all she can about the system, but won't tell her father who she's voting for since it's a secret ballot.
67	7	"The Face in the Shower Room Door"	Danny Arnold	Story by : Bill Idelson & Harvey Miller; Teleplay by : Stan Cutler & Martin Donovan	November 7, 1968	69
Ann gets stuck in the shower and the new neighbor comes to her rescue.
68	8	"A Muggy Day in Central Park"	Hal Cooper	Arthur Julian	November 14, 1968	65
Ann is mugged in Central Park, and though she survives without a scratch, she desperately tries to conceal the incident from her father.
69	9	"Just Donald and Me and Jerry Makes Three"	James Sheldon	Stan Cutler & Martin Donovan	November 21, 1968	70
Jerry and Ruth's marriage is on the rocks, and a remorseful Jerry is interrupting Ann & Donald's time with each other so Don and Ann scheme to reunite the feuding Baumans.
70	10	"The Seventh Time Around"	Richard Kinon	Carl Kleinschmitt	November 28, 1968	72
Donald interviews a wealthy heiress named Lady Margaret "Trixie" Weatherby (Benay Venuta), a woman who has been married six times, that Ann fears might turn Donald into her seventh husband.
71	11	"Ann vs. Secretary"	Hal Cooper	Ruth Brooks Flippen	December 5, 1968	74
Donald hires a new secretary, who Ann suspects is trying to make a move on him...and could actually succeed.
72	12	"Decision Before Dawn"	King Donovan	Jinx Kragen	December 12, 1968	68
The Screen Actor's Guild gives Ann a huge paycheck, and she must struggle on how to invest or spend it.
73	13	"Should All Our Old Acquaintance Be Forgot"	Hal Cooper	Stan Cutler & Martin Donovan	December 26, 1968	63
Ann's plans to spend New Year's Eve alone with Donald are thwarted by her parents, most of her neighbors, their cousins, and people neither of them know.
74	14	"The Homewrecker and the Window Washer"	Hal Cooper	Story by : Ken Englund; Teleplay by : Stan Cutler & Martin Donovan	January 2, 1969	75
When a window washer comes to the rescue of a man who hassles Ann in a building lobby, his wife becomes convinced he's having an affair with her.
75	15	"The Eye of the Beholder"	James Sheldon	Paul Wayne	January 9, 1969	76
Donald buys Ann a small avant-garde sculpture, and gets plenty of advice on what to do with it.
76	16	"Dark on Top of Everything Else"	Ted Bessell	Carl Kleinschmitt	January 16, 1969	73
While watching her parents house in Brewster, Ann gets locked in the basement.
77	17	"The Earrings"	Russ Mayberry	Howard Leeds	January 23, 1969	80
Donald buys Ann some expensive earrings for Valentine's Day, and insists that she wears them on a date that night, in spite of her fear that she might lose them. Sure enough her worst fears are realized, and now both Ann and Don try to hide replacements for them.
78	18	"Many Happy Returns"	Jay Sandrich	John Whedon	January 30, 1969	79
Ann is faced with a sudden audit from the IRS.
79	19	"My Sister's Keeper"	John Rich	Bill Persky & Sam Denoff	February 6, 1969	77
While working on a commercial, Ann's voice is dubbed by a singer that she finds to be fantastic. But her efforts to give this young woman a boost in her career may not go so well, when she finds the young woman has a higher calling. Guest starring Terre and Tony Thomas (Marlo's sister and brother) and featuring a humorous cameo appearance by their father Danny Thomas. McLean Stevenson guest stars.
80	20	"There Was a Time Ann Met a Pie Man"	Russ Mayberry	Milt Rosen	February 13, 1969	78
Ann gets hired to do a television skit where she gets a pie in the face and the bit becomes a big hit.
81	21	"The Subject Was Rabies"	Jay Sandrich	Skip Webster	February 20, 1969	83
A stray dog that follows Ann home bites her visiting father.
82	22	"The Defiant One"	Richard Kinon	Story by : Gene Boland and Richard Baer; Teleplay by : Richard Baer	February 27, 1969	82
While shopping, Ann becomes sympathetic to an eight-year-old African-American boy who tries to steal a candy bar.
83	23	"Fly Me to the Moon"	Richard Kinon	John McGreevey	March 6, 1969	81
The United States Air Force hires Ann to recruit women to the WAF's for potential space travel but Ann must leave while decorating Don's apt.
84	24	"It's So Nice to Have a Mouse Around the House"	Russ Mayberry	Ruth Brooks Flippen	March 13, 1969	84
A lonely night at Ann's apartment is interrupted by a mouse, which somehow makes her father think she and Donald are fooling around.
85	25	"Bad Day at Marvin Gardens"	Danny Arnold	Carl Kleinschmitt	March 20, 1969	85
After inviting her parents over to a baseball game that gets rained out, Ann decides to let them and Donald stay at her place for a game of Monopoly, for which Lou gets much too competitive in.
86	26	"Sue Me, Sue Me, What Can You Do Me?"	Russ Mayberry	Danny Arnold, Ruth Brooks Flippen & Milt Rosen	March 27, 1969	86
Ann's father slips at Donald's office building and hurts himself. Donald has to get him to sign an insurance waiver.

=== Season 4 (1969–70) ===
Starting with this season, episode titles are shown on-screen, beginning with "Mission Improbable".

No. overall	No. in season	Title	Directed by	Written by	Original release date	Prod. code
87	1	"Mission Improbable" (Part 1)	John Rich	Rick Mittleman	September 18, 1969	93
While modeling Ann is hired to spy on a competitor who is suspected of stealing designs.
88	2	"Mission Improbable" (Part 2)	John Rich	Rick Mittleman	September 25, 1969	94
Ann's cover is blown and is tricked into photographing rejected dress designs.
89	3	"My Part Belongs to Daddy"	Richard Kinon	Saul Turteltaub & Bernie Orenstein	October 2, 1969	88
Ann is directing a play back at home in Brewster and has to tell her father that he's not getting the starring role.
90	4	"Nobody Here But Us Chickens"	Richard Kinon	Arnold Horwitt	October 9, 1969	87
Ann gets a job as a dancing chicken and after some advances by the boss ends up stranded in her costume on a country road.
91	5	"At the Drop of a Budget"	Russ Mayberry	Ed Scharlach and Warren Murray	October 16, 1969	89
Under hypnosis at the dentist (guest star Monty Hall), Ann is mistakenly told to buy anything at the drop of a hat at the same time Donald is trying to help her work on a budget.
92	6	"Hearing Today, Gone Tomorrow"	Hal Cooper	Bernie Orenstein & Saul Turteltaub	October 23, 1969	96
Ann loses her hearing when a cold ruins her job on a commercial.
93	7	"The Snow Must Go On"	Russ Mayberry	Arnold Horwitt	October 30, 1969	90
While stranded at JFK Airport during a snowstorm, Ann will do anything to get to an audition on Broadway.
94	8	"Write Is Wrong"	John Rich	Ruth Brooks Flippen	November 6, 1969	98
Don writes a comedy sketch about their previous adventures being stranded at JFK Airport. Don's TV script about Ann undergoes a massive rewrite.
95	9	"Shake Hands and Come Out Acting"	John Rich	Bernie Orenstein & Saul Turteltaub	November 13, 1969	97
Don is doing a story on a fighter (Scoey Mitchell) who has developed an acting bug and Ann tries to help the boxer study drama. However, some of his "handlers" want to make sure he doesn't change his career so soon.
96	10	"Fix My Screen and Bug Out"	Saul Turteltaub	Bernie Orenstein & Saul Turteltaub	November 20, 1969	95
Ann's former boyfriend becomes her new landlord and wants to marry her, much to Don 's chagrin.
97	11	"Kiss That Girl Goodbye"	John Rich	Fai Harris & Lynn Farr	November 27, 1969	99
Donald has a chance to get a job in Paris and worries about leaving Ann.
98	12	"She Never Had the Vegas Notion" (Part 1)	Richard Kinon	Bernie Orenstein & Saul Turteltaub	December 11, 1969	91
Ann gets a job in Las Vegas with an actor who wants her to break up with Donald. Guest star Jack Cassidy. Cameo by Carl Reiner as himself.
99	13	"She Never Had the Vegas Notion" (Part 2)	Richard Kinon	Bernie Orenstein & Saul Turteltaub	December 18, 1969	92
While in Las Vegas, Donald is tricked into thinking that he married an actress. Guest star Jack Cassidy.
100	14	"I Am a Curious Lemon"	Russ Mayberry	Alex Barris	December 25, 1969	101
Ann is babysitting her cousin's 8-year-old daughter who disrupts Ann's dinner for Don's friends.
101	15	"Tenpercent of Nothing Is Nothing"	John Rich	Story by : Ron Clark and Saul Turteltaub & Bernie Orenstein, Teleplay by : Saul Turteltaub & Bernie Orenstein	January 1, 1970	103
Ann Marie is helping her agent with his stand-up comedy act. (NOTE: "Tenpercent" is the way the title appears on-screen; it's unknown whether this was a typo or if it was done intentionally.)
102	16	"Opening Night"	Russ Mayberry	Arnold Horwitt	January 8, 1970	102
Ann dreads bad reviews of her opening night in Broadway, and all this anxiety gets her finger trapped in a kitchen faucet.
103	17	"That Metermaid"	Ted Bessell	Jerry Ross & William Lynn	January 22, 1970	100
Don's new boss and Ann relate a story about Ann's summer job back home when she was younger and worked as a metermaid and ticketed the mayor's car.
104	18	"Fly by Night"	Saul Turteltaub	Bernie Orenstein & Saul Turteltaub	January 29, 1970	104
While flying to a cabin in Vermont, Ann, Donald and their pilot land in a snow storm after they run out of gas. A clip episode. Part 1 of 2.
105	19	"Ugh, Wilderness"	John Rich	Joseph Bonaduce	February 5, 1970	105
Ann and Donald leave the crash site and look for a cabin to stay in. Her father sends out a search party for them. Part 2 of 2.
106	20	"Stocks and the Single Girl"	Bill Persky	Bruce Howard	February 12, 1970	106
Ann gets a card from a stockbroker and invests in the list of items on the back, even though it is his shopping list.
107	21	"The Night They Raided Daddy's"	Hal Cooper	Coslough Johnson	February 19, 1970	107
Ann's father hires a musical group to increase business at his restaurant. He doesn't know that the group performs nude.
108	22	"The Reunion"	Richard Kinon	Saul Turteltaub & Bernie Orenstein	February 26, 1970	108
As class treasurer, Ann loses $360 that was saved for their reunion. Ann looks for the thieves.
109	23	"Gone-a-Courtin'"	Russ Mayberry	Joseph Bonaduce	March 5, 1970	109
Ann has to go to court to help a producer win a lawsuit involving a shish-kebab skewer.
110	24	"They Shoot Pictures, Don't They?"	Russ Mayberry	Saul Turteltaub & Bernie Orenstein	March 12, 1970	110
Ann sees her neighbor Ruthie kissing another man.
111	25	"Easy Faller"	John Rich	Saul Turteltaub & Bernie Orenstein	March 19, 1970	111
After Donald injures his back in her apartment, Ann brings his interviewer to Don. Then her father shows up.
112	26	"All's Well That Ends"	Saul Turteltaub	Sydney Zelinka	March 26, 1970	112
Don wants to take Ann to the theater on her birthday, however, Ann promises prior to babysit a sick child who she suspects of having the mumps.

=== Season 5 (1970–71) ===
In this, the final season of the series, lyrics are given to the opening theme music.

No. overall	No. in season	Title	Directed by	Written by	Original release date	Prod. code
113	1	"Counter-Proposal"	Saul Turteltaub	Saul Turteltaub & Bernie Orenstein	September 25, 1970	113
Donald Hollinger finally asks Ann Marie to marry him and takes his buddy's advice to buy the ring second-hand which Ann promptly returns.
114	2	"Don and Sandi and Harry and Snoopy"	Earl Bellamy	Peggy Elliott	October 2, 1970	115
Donald has Ann spy on his sister Sandy's new beau. Cloris Leachman guest stars as Sandy.
115	3	"I Ain't Got No Body"	Richard Kinon	Ed Scharlach and Warren Murray	October 9, 1970	120
Ann finds her head, but not her body, in "Playpen" magazine's centerfold pin-up.
116	4	"No Man's a Manhattan Island"	Richard Kinon	Arnold Horwitt	October 16, 1970	118
As part of a game show, Ann throws a party for her neighbors and gets her purse stolen.
117	5	"Rattle of a Single Girl"	John Rich	Bruce Howard	October 23, 1970	114
Ann and Donald go to pre-marital counselling finding problems that may or may not be there.
118	6	"There Sure Are a Bunch of Cards in St. Louis" (Part 1)	Richard Kinon	Saul Turteltaub & Bernie Orenstein	October 30, 1970	126
Ann is working in a play in St. Louis and has difficulties while visiting Don's parents.
119	7	"There Sure Are a Bunch of Cards in St. Louis" (Part 2)	Richard Kinon	Saul Turteltaub & Bernie Orenstein	November 6, 1970	127
Ann is working in a play in St. Louis and has difficulties while visiting Don's parents, including Don's great-aunt. Former St. Louis Cardinals outfielder Stan Musial appears as himself.
120	8	"That Cake"	Richard Kinon	Rick Mittleman	November 13, 1970	116
Ann thinks she accidentally bakes her engagement ring in a cake that is going to the Governor of New York's residence. Guest star Regis Philbin.
121	9	"That Girl's Daddy"	John Rich	Saul Turteltaub & Bernie Orenstein	November 20, 1970	122
Ann's father is feeling much younger after he is introduced to a younger lady. Ann thinks he's going to leave her mother.
122	10	"Stop the Presses, I Want to Get Off"	Saul Turteltaub	Gordon Farr	November 27, 1970	123
Ann is hired by a rival news magazine when they think that Donald will help Ann with her assignments.
123	11	"Super Reporter"	Richard Kinon	Saul Turteltaub & Bernie Orenstein	December 4, 1970	121
Donald is stuck in a superhero costume when his buddies steal his clothes and he is getting an award from the deputy mayor.
124	12	"That Señorita"	John Rich	Saul Turteltaub & Bernie Orenstein	December 11, 1970	124
Ann gets a lesson in minority relations when she is in a television sketch that is offensive to Mexicans. Rodolfo Hoyos, Jr. guest stars as Rudy Sanchez.
125	13	"An Uncle Herbert for All Seasons"	John Rich	Bob Garland	December 18, 1970	125
Ann's flamboyant Uncle Herbert (Joe Flynn) is turning Ann and Donald's world upside down when he makes bogus get-rich-quick schemes.
126	14	"That Script"	Roger Duchowny	Saul Turteltaub & Bernie Orenstein	January 1, 1971	128
Ann wants to get the movie rights for a novel whose author thinks that Ann resembles his late wife.
127	15	"Those Friars"	Alan Rifkin	Marvin Walkenstein	January 8, 1971	132
Ann's late Uncle Harry wills her an old trunk used during his career in vaudeville. Stars Milton Berle and Danny Thomas show up wanting to buy the old trunk.
128	16	"A Limited Engagement"	Richard Kinon	Saul Turteltaub & Bernie Orenstein	January 15, 1971	130
Donald gets cold feet about marriage and breaks their engagement.
129	17	"The Russians Are Staying"	Homer Powell	Saul Turteltaub & Bernie Orenstein	January 29, 1971	129
Ann meets a Russian (a defecting Soviet comic) who moves in with her and won't leave.
130	18	"That Shoplifter"	Richard Kinon	Arnold Horwitt	February 5, 1971	134
Ann is tricked by a conman into shoplifting.
131	19	"Chef's Night Out"	Richard Kinon	Budd Grossman	February 12, 1971	117
Running her father's restaurant is tough for Ann and Don when the staff comes down with the flu.
132	20	"That King"	Richard Kinon	Warren Murray	February 19, 1971	135
the King of Kowali invites Ann to a state dinner where she discovers the King is an 11 yr. old child.
133	21	"Stag Party"	John Rich	Saul Turteltaub & Bernie Orenstein	February 26, 1971	133
The stag party thrown by Don's buddies costs him his engagement to Ann.
134	22	"Two for the Money"	Roger Duchowny	San Nichols	March 5, 1971	131
Ann gets a modeling assignment at Belmont Racetrack and when Don's friends realize there's a horse running named for her, they see it as a "sign" and send her with the money to place a bet for them. She loses the ticket at the wrong time!
135	23	"Soot Yourself"	Saul Turteltaub	Saul Turteltaub & Bernie Orenstein	March 12, 1971	119
As a member of an ecology-minded group, Ann is assigned to picket in front of the Newsview Magazine building where Donald works. Donald tries to make amends by inviting his boss to Ann's house for dinner.
136	24	"The Elevated Woman"	Roger Duchowny	Saul Turteltaub & Bernie Orenstein	March 19, 1971	136
Stuck in an elevator, Donald and Ann reminisce about their last five years together (clip episode, series finale).
