= Are You with It? =

1948 film by Jack Hively

- Directed by: Jack Hively
- Written by: Oscar Brodney
- Based on: The musical Are You with It? (book by Sam Perrin and George Balzer) and the novel Slightly Perfect by George Malcolm-Smith
- Produced by: Robert Arthur
- Starring: Donald O'Connor; Olga San Juan; Martha Stewart; Lew Parker; Walter Catlett; Pat Dane
- Cinematography: Maury Gertsman
- Music by: Walter Scharf; Sidney Miller; Inez James
- Production company: Universal-International Pictures
- Distributed by: Universal Pictures
- Release date: March 20, 1948
- Running time: 93 minutes
- Country: United States
- Language: English

Are You with It? is a 1948 American musical comedy film directed by Jack Hively. The plot is about a young insurance man who quits his job to join a traveling carnival. The film is based on the 1945 Broadway musical of the same name and the 1941 novel Slightly Perfect by George Malcolm-Smith. The film stars Donald O'Connor, Olga San Juan, Martha Stewart and Lew Parker. Parker reprised his role from the musical.

== Plot ==
Previously infallible actuary Milton Haskins is mortified when he misplaces a decimal point which would have cost the Nutmeg Insurance Company money if it had not been caught. He also loses a brand new promotion. Depressed, he lets wisecracking carny Goldie McGoldrick talk him into getting "with it" and joining Acres of Fun, a traveling carnival. They discover that Milton can tap dance (due to his mathematical skills) and sing. He gets to show off his newfound abilities when a performer shows up drunk. Milton dances and sings "Down at Baba's Alley", and the act gets three curtain calls.

Milton's fiancée and former secretary, Vivian Reilly, tries to get him to resume his old, humdrum life, but he likes it where he is. Bunny La Fleur, Goldie's girl, talks Vivian into coming along so she can try to change Milton's mind. Meanwhile, a mysterious person tries to search through Milton's suitcase, and when Milton shows up, throws a knife at him.

On the train, Sally (at the instigation of Herman Bogel, the carnival's accountant) asks Milton about insurance to find out more about him. Vivian overhears what sounds like Milton being too friendly with Sally from the next compartment, though Milton is actually dealing with Sally's dog Boopsie. That causes a rift between the couple.

Later, Milton is startled when Vivian shows up in the middle of his act and starts doing a fan dance (though it is clear she is fully, if skimpily, clothed). When he drags her off the stage, the audience riots, and they all end up in jail. That leaves the carnival in dire financial straits, and owner Jason "Pop" Carter in danger of losing it to potential buyer Mrs. Minerva Henkle and unable to post bail for most of his people. Bogel reveals that he is now working for Mrs. Henkle. Faced with ruin, Pop reluctantly agrees to sell.

Nutmeg executive Mr. Bixby pays for Milton and Vivian's release on condition that Milton go back to work for him (and pay for it out of his salary). At a business meeting, Milton advises the company to keep his original mistake; it turns out that what Nutmeg loses with the reduced rate is more than made up by the large number of new customers. Then Vivian shows him what she found out about Mrs. Henkle from the company's files.

The couple hurry back to the carnival and convince Pop to fight to keep it. They put on a show, starting with just the five of them, then use the receipts to gradually bail out the rest of the carnies. When Bogel and Mrs. Henkle show up to take possession of the carnival, Milton proves that she defrauded Nutmeg, collecting on a life insurance policy a week ago for her husband, presumed lost at sea and legally declared dead seven years later. Milton identifies Bogel as Mr. Henkle by the tattoo on his chest. Since the payout was used to buy the carnival, Nutmeg is the new owner, so Milton and Vivian can work for both.

== Cast ==
- Donald O'Connor as Milton Haskins
- Olga San Juan as Vivian Reilly
- Martha Stewart as Bunny La Fleur
- Lew Parker as John "Goldie" McGoldrick
- Walter Catlett as Jason "Pop" Carter
- Patricia Dane as Sally (as Pat Dane)
- Ransom Sherman as Mr. Bixby, Milton's Nutmeg boss
- Louis DaPron as Bartender. DaPron was a longtime choreographer at Universal who frequently worked with O'Connor. In this film, he performed a tap dance number with O'Connor and Parker and is credited as the "Dance Director".
- Noel Neill as Terry
- Julie Gibson as Ann
- George O'Hanlon as Buster, the drunk
- Eddie Parks as Herman Bogel
- Raymond Largay as Mr. Mapleton, president of Nutmeg
- Jody Gilbert as Mrs. Minerva Henkle
- Howard Negley as Ed McNaughton

== Musical numbers ==
All written by Sidney Miller and Inez James

- "Are You with It?", performed by Martha Stewart
- "Down at Baba's Alley", performed by Donald O'Connor
- "What Do I Have to Do?", performed by Donald O'Connor
- "Daddy, Surprise Me", performed by Olga San Juan
- "I'm Looking for a Prince of a Fella", performed by Olga San Juan

== Reception ==
The New York Times gave Are You with It? a lukewarm review, describing it as "a collection of specialty numbers, loosely strung together by a frivolous plot". "The picture ambles along good naturedly enough, but its lines and situations are for the most part thin inducement to laughter."
