= List of Kate & Allie episodes =

This is a list of all episodes of the television series Kate & Allie. The Production Codes were taken from the United States Copyright Office.

== Series overview ==
Season	Episodes	Originally released	
Season	Episodes	First released	Last released
1	6	March 19, 1984	May 7, 1984
2	22	October 8, 1984	May 6, 1985
3	23	September 30, 1985	May 12, 1986
4	25	September 22, 1986	May 18, 1987
5	24	September 14, 1987	May 23, 1988
6	22	December 11, 1988	May 22, 1989

== Episodes ==
=== Season 1 (1984) ===
No. overall	No. in season	Title	Directed by	Written by	Original release date	Prod. code	Rating/share (households)
1	1	"Allie's First Date"	Bill Persky	Sherry Coben	March 19, 1984	001	23.1/34
Allie meets and chats with Kate's blind date, David (Kelsey Grammer), while Kate gets ready. Although they didn't have a terrible time, Kate and David decide not to pursue a relationship. The surprise comes when David calls Kate...to ask if it would be all right to call Allie for a date. After a long discussion with Kate, Allie agrees to the date. Unfortunately, Allie realizes that, since this is her first date since her divorce, she's a bit rusty when it comes to dinner conversation and things don't go well.
2	2	"The Very Loud Family"	Bill Persky	David Handler & Peter Gethers	March 26, 1984	002	20.6/31
When Allie and Kate challenge Emma to do a more creative project for school, she decides to make a documentary about her life at home, including all the conflicts and dramas that come with "The Changing World of Divorce". Note- In 1984 this episode won the Emmy for Outstanding Directing in a Comedy Series.
3	3	"Odd Boy Out"	Bill Persky	Sherry Coben	April 16, 1984	003	16.6/25
Chip is labeled a sissy for living with four women, so Charles starts to spend more time with him -- which makes Chip want to live with him instead of Allie. But when Charles cancels a camping trip, it's up to Kate and Allie to take his place.
4	4	"The Family Business"	Bill Persky	Bob Randall	April 23, 1984	004	18.3/28
Kate convinces Allie to go into business selling her grandmother's "secret" cakes. As business picks up, Kate and Allie grow tiresome of their new hectic business adventure.
5	5	"Dear Diary"	Bill Persky	Fred Barron, Bob Randall and Sherry Coben	April 30, 1984	006	16.8/26
Kate and Allie fight over Allie's moving her belongings from storage into the apartment, and Kate reads Allie's diary and finds out that Allie once kissed Kate's boyfriend in high school.
6	6	"A Weekend to Remember"	Bill Persky	Bob Randall	May 7, 1984	005	15.1/21
Kate's ex-husband (John Heard) wines and dines her into re-thinking their relationship.

=== Season 2 (1984–85) ===
No. overall	No. in season	Title	Directed by	Written by	Original release date	Prod. code	Rating/share (households)
7	1	"Baby"	Bill Persky	Sherry Coben	October 8, 1984	2005/011	14.2/20
Kate and Allie look after a friend's newborn baby, which starts Kate wondering whether she wants another baby. But when the baby's absentee father shows up, they learn that the baby's mother is preventing him from seeing the baby.
8	2	"Landlady"	Bill Persky	Bob Randall	October 15, 1984	2001/007	20.0/29
Kate and Allie's landlady demands back-rent because she insists that Kate and Allie's families are separate.
9	3	"Diner"	Bill Persky	Stu Hample	October 22, 1984	2003/009	18.1/27
Allie has second thoughts about selling her old house when Charles insists on selling it to the current renters.
10	4	"Lottsa Luck"	Bill Persky	David Handler & Peter Gethers	October 29, 1984	2002/008	18.1/26
Kate's eccentric Aunt leaves her an item in her will, which appears to be a lucky charm for anyone who wears it.
11	5	"Candidate"	Bill Persky	Dennis Danzinger & Ellen Sandler	November 5, 1984	2006/012	16.9/25
Allie helps a local political candidate with his campaign, but after he makes a pass at her, she finds out that he is married. NOTE: First appearance of Sam Freed, as Jonathan Conti, who will later play boyfriend, then husband of Allie, Bob Barsky
12	6	"Kate and the Plumber"	Bill Persky	Bob Randall	November 12, 1984	2009/015	18.9/27
A plumber fixes the kitchen faucet and asks Kate out on a date, but both of them begin to wonder whether they are too different to ever have a meaningful relationship. NOTE: First appearance of Gregory Salata as Ted Bartelo, Kate's on-again/off-again boyfriend.
13	7	"The Safe Caper"	Bill Persky	Victoria Rauch Lichterman	November 19, 1984	2008/014	14.2/21
Kate and Allie find a safe behind a wall in the apartment, which contains an unsent letter from a man to a woman
14	8	"Pirates"	Bill Persky	Sherry Coben	November 26, 1984	2007/013	18.7/27
Emma and Jennie both compete for a lead in their school's production of The Pirates of Penzance.
15	9	"Country Dog"	Bill Persky	Allan Leicht	December 3, 1984	2010/016	20.3/29
Chip gets a dog, but it soon becomes clear that the dog is not suited to city life in an apartment.
16	10	"Piano Lesson"	Bill Persky	Allan Leicht	December 10, 1984	2011/017	23.0/34
Emma's father gives her a piano, and she begins to take lessons with a very cute piano teacher...whom both Kate and Emma show romantic interest in.
17	11	"New Year's Eve"	Bill Persky	Jane Richmond	December 31, 1984	2015/021	16.9/30
The girls have a teenage New Years party, Kate and Allie spend a night "on the town", and everyone agrees to adhere to New Years resolutions.
18	12	"Back to School"	Bill Persky	Bob Randall	January 7, 1985	2004/010	21.4/30
Allie decides to go back to school.
19	13	"Charles Marries Claire"	Bill Persky	Sherry Coben	January 14, 1985	2012/018	19.8/28
Charles and Claire split up, and Allie wonders whether Charles might be interested in getting back together.
20	14	"If She Goes, I Go"	Bill Persky	Bob Randall	February 4, 1985	2017/023	15.7/21
Kate gets Allie hired at her travel agency, but when Kate saves Allie's job after she messes up, Allie begins to resent Kate portraying herself as a hero to everyone she tells the story to.
21	15	"Rear Window"	Bill Persky	Stu Hample	February 11, 1985	2013/019	21.8/31
When Chip is sent to his room for misbehaviour, he and the girls think they have witnessed a murder in the apartment across from Chip's window.
22	16	"Lovely Rita"	Bill Persky	Sherry Coben	February 18, 1985	2014/020	17.3/24
Kate's father begins dating a rich socialite, whom Kate begins to dislike the more she gets to know her.
23	17	"Sons and Lovers"	Bill Persky	David Handler & Peter Gethers	February 25, 1985	2016/022	18.2/26
Allie begins dating a young student at her college.
24	18	"Author, Author"	Bill Persky	Allan Leicht	March 4, 1985	2018/024	20.8/30
Kate and Allie both suspect that the lead character in a romantic novel written by their favorite college professor (Noel Harrison) is based on them.
25	19	"Dead Cat"	Bill Persky	Bob Randall & Sherry Coben	March 11, 1985	2021/027	19.6/29
Kate buys Chip a kitten, but when the kitten dies suddenly, Kate goes all out to make Chip happy again.
26	20	"The Bad Seed"	Bill Persky	Sherry Coben	March 18, 1985	2019/025	21.2/31
Jennie starts hanging out with a rebellious young girlfriend (Martha Byrne), whose bad attitude begins to rub off on Jennie.
27	21	"Goodbye, Plumber"	Bill Persky	Bob Randall	April 8, 1985	2020/026	19.1/29
Ted proposes to Kate, who realises that her dreams of the future and his are vastly different.
28	22	"My Dinner With Kate and Allie"	Bill Persky	Allan Leicht & Sherry Coben	May 6, 1985	2022/028	16.9/26
After Charles and Claire's wedding, Kate and Allie go over their past relationships together and debate love and life.

=== Season 3 (1985–86) ===
No. overall	No. in season	Title	Directed by	Written by	Original release date	Prod. code	Rating/share (households)
29	1	"The Reunion"	Bill Persky	Trish Vrandenburg and Bob Randall	September 30, 1985	3003/516-031	22.4/32
Kate and Allie attend their high school reunion, and are forced to deal with a snobbish socialite (Patricia Richardson) who tormented Allie when they were classmates.
30	2	"Make Mine Mink"	Bill Persky	Karyl Geld Miller & Korby Siamis	October 7, 1985	3002/516-030	17.9/26
While eating out together, Kate and Allie are given a mink coat by an irate woman angry with her lover. Kate is reluctant to return the coat once the woman tries to reclaim it.
31	3	"Whatever Happened to Romance?"	Bill Persky	Anne Flett & Chuck Ranberg	October 14, 1985	3004/516-032	20.5/29
Emma and Jennie respond to and exchange letters with an anonymous man who posted an ad in the personals column.
32	4	"Evening in Paris"	Bill Persky	Bob Randall	October 21, 1985	3005/516-033	21.0/31
Allie and Jennie are given a weekend trip to Paris when Charles gets the flu and can't go, but when Allie gets sick too, the "perfect weekend" is in jeopardy for both women.
33	5	"Picture of An Affair"	Bill Persky	Bob Randall	October 28, 1985	3001/516-029	20.0/29
When Allie uses her father's camera to take pictures, she discovers a picture which suggests that her father may be having an affair.
34	6	"The Maltese Chotchke"	Bill Persky	Anne Flett & Chuck Ranberg	November 4, 1985	3007/516-035	18.4/26
A birthday present from Emma's father proves to be a mystery, as several persons show up at the house looking to acquire the item.
35	7	"Allie's Affair"	Bill Persky	Bob Randall	November 11, 1985	3008/516-036	20.0/27
Allie's teacher (Franc Luz) takes a romantic interest in her, and asks her to go away for the weekend with her.
36	8	"Thanksgiving"	Bill Persky	Anne Flett & Chuck Ranberg	November 25, 1985	3009/516-037	21.7/30
Allie is frazzled while trying to prepare for Thanksgiving dinner, especially since Charles' new wife, Claire (Wendie Malick), will be meeting her for the first time.
37	9	"Max's New Girlfriend"	Bill Persky	Tula Demetra	December 2, 1985	3006/516-034	19.3/26
Kate's ex-husband, Max, brings his new girlfriend to meet Emma, and the two start hanging out all the time, much to Kate's dismay.
38	10	"Kate's Friend"	Bill Persky	Story by : Sybil Adelman and Martin Sage; Teleplay by : Mindy Glazer	December 16, 1985	3011/516-039	17.7/26
Kate's friend -- a demanding corporate executive -- arrives and stays at the house, causing Allie to doubt the strength of her own friendship with Kate.
39	11	"Dress to Kill"	Bill Persky	Steven Kunes	December 23, 1985	3010/516-038	18.8/29
Allie buys Kate a dress, which she intends to return after wearing it to a party, but problems arise when the dress gets dirty and then gets misplaced while at the dry cleaners.
40	12	"Dark Victory"	Bill Persky	Bob Randall	January 6, 1986	3012/516-040	21.6/31
Kate makes a date with a man during a blackout, and has her liberal values tested when it turns out that the man is African-American.
41	13	"Grand Central Station"	Bill Persky	Bob Randall	January 13, 1986	3013/516-041	21.9/31
Allie's boyfriend sends a singing telegram to the house, but the actor is followed by his parents who criticize him for not following in the family business.
42	14	"Chip's Divorce"	Bill Persky	Dana Persky & Lorrie Shapiro	January 20, 1986	3014/516-042	21.5/31
Chip is upset and feels unloved when it is revealed that Claire, Charles' new wife, is pregnant with another baby.
43	15	"Too Late The Rebel"	Bill Persky	Anne Flett & Chuck Ranberg	January 27, 1986	3015/516-043	18.4/25
Kate and Allie are arrested after a sit-in at Allie's university to protest the school's investing in a chemical factory. Guest starring Ben Stiller.
44	16	"The Croissant Jungle"	Bill Persky	Anne Flett & Chuck Ranberg	February 3, 1986	3016/516-044	21.5/32
Jennie's young new boss fires her after she refuses to go out on a date with him.
45	17	"Privacy"	Bill Persky	Anne Flett & Chuck Ranberg	February 10, 1986	3017/516-045	21.6/30
Allie worries that Kate may be thinking of moving out after she starts seeing a mysterious man whom Kate is very secretive about.
46	18	"High Anxiety"	Bill Persky	David Handler & Peter Gethers	February 17, 1986	3018/516-046	20.0/28
Allie worries about being put on television after one of Kate's old friends (Paul Gleason) wants to make a television series about Kate and Allie's non-traditional family unit. Dick Cavett appears as himself.
47	19	"Thank You, Shirley"	Bill Persky	Jane Richmond	February 24, 1986	3019/516-047	19.7/29
Kate's cousin Shirley introduces the ladies to a man (David Rasche) who takes an interest in both of them, so Kate and Allie devise a scheme to force him to choose between them.
48	20	"Ted's Back"	Bill Persky	Bob Randall	March 3, 1986	3021/516-049	20.8/30
Kate's former boyfriend (and almost fiancee) returns, leading Kate to contemplate different future scenarios of how her life (and the lives of her friends and family) might change with the choices she's faced with.
49	21	"Chip's New Friend"	Bill Persky	Anne Flett & Chuck Ranberg	March 17, 1986	3020/516-048	19.3/30
Chip befriends a mentally challenged young man who both helps and is helped by Kate and Allie.
50	22	"Winning"	Bill Persky	Marc Jacobs	April 14, 1986	3022/516-050	19.7/30
While Emma runs for class president, Jennie learns a secret about Emma's closest rival in the race (April Lerman).
51	23	"Late Bloomer"	Bill Persky	Bob Randall	May 12, 1986	3024/516-052	14.2/22
Fed up with her inability to cook, Kate gets cooking lessons from a woman who is both a teacher and a student at Allie's school. Guest Stars Lindsay Wagner, Sam Freed, Barbara Barrie, and Mercedes Ruehl. NOTE: Second appearance by Sam Freed, as another character before appearing as Bob Barsky, future boyfriend, then husband of Allie. This episode was also used to spin off a pilot for a series that was never realized.

=== Season 4 (1986–87) ===
No. overall	No. in season	Title	Directed by	Written by	Original release date	Prod. code	Rating/share (households)
52	1	"The Trouble with Jason"	Bill Persky	Anne Flett & Chuck Ranberg	September 22, 1986	4003/530-055	17.8/28
Emma becomes the object of a new student (Ricky Paull Goldin)'s affections, but she sees his advances as nothing but troublesome and annoying. Guest starring Stephen Baldwin as one of the classroom students (uncredited).
53	2	"Found Money"	Bill Persky	Michael Zettler & Shelly Altman	September 29, 1986	4004/530-056	19.3/30
Kate and Allie find a wallet with money in it, and when the owner pays them money for returning it, Allie finds it difficult to spend the money on something special for herself. Notes: This was the first of a series of episodes with introductory dialogues between Kate and Allie's children, rather than Kate and Allie. Those introductions that included Kate and Allie during this period had Kate engaged in activities which served to hide her pregnant condition (e.g., playing on a see saw).
54	3	"The Bully"	Bill Persky	Howard Korder	October 6, 1986	4009/530-061	17.3/27
Chip becomes the target of a bully, and Allie learns that peaceful negotiations aren't always the answer. David Groh guest stars as the bully's father. Notes: This is the first episode where Kate is seen in a hospital bed, which was used as a storyline to hide the fact that Susan Saint James was pregnant at the time. Most likely to compensate for Susan's inability to appear standing in profile.
55	4	"General Hospital"	Bill Persky	Dana Persky & Lorrie Shapiro	October 13, 1986	4008/530-060	18.7/28
Allie checks into a hospital bed beside Kate to have a mole removed, and proceeds to scare herself about what else might be wrong with her. Guest starring William H. Macy as an orderly.
56	5	"Rx for Love"	Bill Persky	Gloria Gonzalez	October 20, 1986	4010/530-062	18.5/27
Kate and her doctor begin a casual relationship, but Kate accidentally learns that he is still married.
57	6	"Halloween II"	Bill Persky	Anne Flett & Chuck Ranberg	October 27, 1986	4005/530-057	18.0/26
A mix-up during a Halloween parade causes Kate to bring home a stranger...who also claims to have brought his dead, invisible wife in as well.
58	7	"Jennie and Jason"	Bill Persky	Bob Randall	November 3, 1986	4006/530-058	19.1/28
Jennie and her boyfriend, Jason, consider having sex.
59	8	"Bringing Up Charles"	Bill Persky	Jane Richmond	November 10, 1986	4011/530-063	19.5/29
Charles begins to neglect both Chip and his new wife and child, causing Allie to suspect that Charles is having yet another affair.
60	9	"Emma's Coming Out Party"	Bill Persky	Bob Randall	November 24, 1986	4007/530-059	20.0/30
Kate and Allie remember the day Emma was born, as they met one day years after college and found that their lives and values were now total opposites.
61	10	"Stage Mother"	Bill Persky	Bob Randall	December 1, 1986	4012/530-064	17.8/26
After a successful school talent show performance, Allie gets Jennie a part singing on a low-rated cable show (and proceeds to drive Jennie crazy with all her overbearing coaching). Guest stars in this and the subsequent episode are Andrea Martin as the cable show's executive producer, Grant Shaud as the director and Bill Cobbs as the cameraman.
62	11	"The Goodbye Girl"	Bill Persky	Bob Randall	December 8, 1986	4013/530-065	18.4/27
Allie helps her cable producer friend fill eight hours of air time, or else her friend will lose her job.
63	12	"Dates of Future Past"	Bill Persky	Anne Flett & Chuck Ranberg	December 15, 1986	4014/530-066	18.1/27
Allie meets an ex-football player, Bob Barsky, at the supermarket. Bob wants to take Allie on a weekend date to Boston. NOTE: This is the third appearance of Sam Freed, but first appearance as Bob Barsky, future boyfriend, then husband of Allie.
64	13	"Gift of the Magi"	Bill Persky	Bob Randall	January 5, 1987	4002/530-054	20.2/29
Kate and Allie struggle to buy the perfect gift for each other.
65	14	"Allie's Graduation"	Bill Persky	Bob Randall	January 26, 1987	3023/516-051	20.5/28
Allie graduates from college, then learns that finding a job is not easy, even with a degree. Note: This episode was taped during Season 3.
66	15	"Upstairs, Downstairs"	Bill Persky	Howard Korder	February 2, 1987	4017/530-069	18.3/28
When Kate and Allie try to help resolve a fight between Jennie and Emma, they end up arguing with each other.
67	16	"Emma Goes to College"	Bill Persky	Anne Flett & Chuck Ranberg	February 9, 1987	4016/530-068	20.5/29
Emma gets accepted to college, and must decide which one she will attend -- one in New York, or one in California (where her father lives).
68	17	"Allie and the Three Wolves"	Bill Persky	Bob Randall and Howard Korder	February 16, 1987	4015/530-067	19.7/27
Kate convinces Allie to come with her to a singles bar, where three regulars make a bet as to who can pick up Allie first. Christopher Murney, featured as one of the three regulars, also appeared as a different character in the series finale.
69	18	"Louis in Love"	Bill Persky	Anne Flett & Chuck Ranberg	February 23, 1987	4018/530-070	19.0/27
When Kate tries to get Chip's friend, Louis, to "make the first move" with a girl who likes him, Louis misunderstands and thinks Kate likes him.
70	19	"Reruns"	Bill Persky	Bob Randall	March 2, 1987	4019/530-071	19.5/28
When a mysterious, "personal and private" letter for Charles accidentally arrives in Allie's mail, she resists the temptation to open it; while sleeping, she dreams of her and Allie appearing in similar scenarios as characters from I Love Lucy and The Mary Tyler Moore Show.
71	20	"Send Me No Flowers"	Bill Persky	Bob Randall	March 16, 1987	4001/530-053	17.6/26
Allie, Emma, Kate and Jennie all trade bad day stories while figuring out who is the recipient and sender of a package of flowers with an apologetic card. Ricki Lake appears as one of two girls who verbally harass Emma.
72	21	"Dearly Beloved"	Bill Persky and David Trainer	Susan Connaughton Curtin	March 23, 1987	4020/530-072	15.9/24
Chip meets a new girl ([Chay Lentin]) in the neighborhood, and struggles to raise the money needed to take her out to dinner and a play.
73	22	"Allie on Strike"	Bill Persky	Howard Korder	April 6, 1987	4022/530-074	16.2/25
Fed up with being taken for granted, Allie decides to "go on strike", and refuses to do any domestic chores around the house.
74	23	"Kate Quits"	Bill Persky	Anne Flett & Chuck Ranberg	May 4, 1987	4023/530-075	15.4/25
Fed up with the increasingly mundane nature of her job as a travel agent, Kate quits her job.
75	24	"Charles' Dinner"	Bill Persky	Bob Randall	May 11, 1987	4021/530-073	14.3/25
Charles hires Kate and Allie to cater a party celebrating his wedding anniversary to Claire, but Allie wants nothing to do with the affair.
76	25	"Allie's Surprise Party"	Bill Persky	Howard Korder	May 18, 1987	4024/530-076	14.5/24
Allie is convinced that Kate is planning a surprise 39th birthday party for her, despite Kate's insisting that there is no surprise party.

=== Season 5 (1987–88) ===
No. overall	No. in season	Title	Directed by	Written by	Original release date	Prod. code	Rating/share (households)
77	1	"Fathers and Sons"	Bill Persky	Bob Randall	September 14, 1987	5004/558-080	15.6/25
A future adult Chip and his son flash back to a time when young Chip was worried about what he wanted to be when he grows up.
78	2	"The Dilemma with Emma"	Bill Persky	Anne Flett & Chuck Ranberg	September 21, 1987	5002/558-078	15.6/24
While Jennie breaks up with Jason, Emma finally finds her boyfriend in Evin (Richard Joseph Paul) who dropped the K from his actual name because he thought Kevin "sounded too suburban." The relationship turns into a nightmare for hip, freethinking Kate when Evin turns out to be an arrogant, condescending Yuppie with a five-year plan for life.
79	3	"Kate and the Cab Driver"	Bill Persky	Bob Randall	September 28, 1987	5003/558-079	13.0/20
Kate meets a cab driver, Dennis (David Purdham), who takes little responsibility for anything, to Kate's delight but Allie's frustration.
80	4	"Mother's Day"	Bill Persky	Nita Wilson-Klein & Marco Pennette	October 5, 1987	5001/558-077	15.1/23
Kate and Allie decide to take a proactive stand and improve relations with their mothers. Guest starring Scotty Bloch as Joan, Allie's mother, and Marian Seldes as Marion, Kate's mother.
81	5	"Return of Bob Barsky"	Bill Persky	Anne Flett & Chuck Ranberg	October 12, 1987	5005/558-081	17.6/27
Bob Barsky, Allie's one-time lover after her divorce, returns to New York and starts dating her...and another woman as well.
82	6	"Brother, Can You Spare a Dime?"	Bill Persky	Story by : Anne Flett & Chuck Ranberg; Teleplay by : Bob Randall & Bill Persky	October 19, 1987	5006/558-082	16.2/24
A series of unfortunate events while trying to get home leaves Allie alone, penniless and on the other side of New York City. The only episode almost entirely filmed outdoors on location, it was produced in cooperation with the Coalition for the Homeless.
83	7	"Ted's Fix Up"	Bill Persky	Dana Persky	October 26, 1987	5008/558-084	18.3/27
Kate fixes her friend up with her ex, Ted, while her friend fixes Kate up with her ex. They all meet at the ballet, and as the friend and her ex get back together, Kate and Ted decide to give their relationship another shot. This episode marks the return of Gregory Salata as Ted.
84	8	"Jennie's New Deal"	Bill Persky	Daryl Rowland	November 9, 1987	5007/558-083	13.6/20
Emma moves into the dorm at Columbia University, while Jennie is still stuck back at the apartment at Greenwich Village. Chip intercedes on Jennie’s behalf and convinces Allie to allow Jennie more freedom of movement.
85	9	"Hired Wife"	Bill Persky	Howard Korder	November 16, 1987	5009/558-085	14.3/21
Kate pretends to be the wife of a man whose company requires that their management staff be married in order to get a promotion.
86	10	"The Marriage Counselor"	Bill Persky	Bob Randall	November 23, 1987	5011/558-087	14.1/21
Bob suggests that the women go to a marriage counselor to help them get over their constant bickering.
87	11	"The Triangle Has Four Sides"	Bill Persky	Bob Randall	December 7, 1987	5010/558-086	15.9/24
Kate ends up trying to date two guys at once, but then considers whether she truly likes either of them.
88	12	"The Nightmare Before Christmas"	Bill Persky	Anne Flett & Chuck Ranberg	December 14, 1987	5013/558-089	15.3/22
Kate, Allie, and the kids decide not to have a traditional Christmas, and instead take odd jobs throughout December as "Santa's Helpers" for other families in order to pay for a ski trip. Guest starring Debra Jo Rupp as a toy store clerk.
89	13	"A Catered Affair"	Bill Persky	Dick Goldberg	January 4, 1988	5012/558-088	16.3/23
Kate and Allie are taken to court by a female client (Patricia Elliott) because they accidentally revealed to her husband that she was having an affair.
90	14	"The Band Singer"	Bill Persky	Anne Flett, Chuck Ranberg and Bob Randall	January 11, 1988	5014/558-090	14.5/21
Jennie tries to win the affections of band manager Howard (Jonathan Scherick) by auditioning for the role of lead singer. The band Local Heroes is also featured.
91	15	"Almost Married" "And Then There Were None"	Bill Persky	Bob Randall	January 18, 1988	5015/558-091	15.1/22
Kate and Allie hope to spend a peaceful weekend in the woods with their boyfriends, but the cabin is too rustic and an escaped convict is loose in the area.
92	16	"My Day with Paul Newman"	Bill Persky	Tony Lang	February 1, 1988	5016/558-092	13.7/20
Huge Paul Newman fan Allie gets carried away in her attempt to meet the actor, aggravating a movie crew attempting to film a scene at the front door of the apartment.
93	17	"The Namath of the Game"	Bill Persky	Anne Flett & Chuck Ranberg	February 3, 1988	5017/558-093	12.7/20
Kate becomes the personal assistant to Joe Namath, leaving Allie to shoulder the burdens of running their catering business.
94	18	"The Mouse That Squeaked"	Bill Persky	Anne Flett & Chuck Ranberg	February 8, 1988	5019/558-095	14.5/21
Chip brings home a pet mouse which escapes from his cage and terrorizes Kate and Allie...and even Bob! NOTE: This is the last appearance of Ari Meyers as Emma McArdle, aside from clips and flashbacks, until "The Clip Show", but her name remains in the credits until the end of the fifth season.
95	19	"Inside Park Avenue"	Bill Persky	Bob Randall	February 15, 1988	5018/558-094	14.5/21
While catering a woman's (Kathleen Noone) 25th wedding anniversary, Kate and Allie both get hit on by the woman's husband.
96	20	"Working Women"	Bill Persky	Bob Randall	February 22, 1988	5020/558-096	13.3/20
Kate and Allie are hired by an extremely demanding male client, while Jennie prepares a presentation on how women have been exploited in the workplace over the last century.
97	21	"I Don't, I Don't"	Bill Persky	Bob Randall	March 14, 1988	5021/558-097	14.0/21
After a lifetime as a bachelor, Bob begins to worry about the prospect of marrying Allie.
98	22	"Bob Smells the Roses"	Bill Persky	Anne Flett & Chuck Ranberg	March 21, 1988	5022/558-098	14.6/23
After worrying about the prospect of marrying Allie, Bob now begins to embrace the idea...perhaps with a little too much passion. NOTE: This is the last appearance of Gregory Salata as Ted Bartelo, Kate's on-again/off-again boyfriend.
99	23	"Allie Makes Up Her Mind"	Bill Persky	Bob Randall	March 28, 1988	5023/558-099	13.6/21
After Bob proposes, Allie begins debating whether to get married for a second time. Meanwhile, Kate has already arranged an engagement party and has invited Allie's domineering mother and Charles, her former husband.
100	24	"The Clip Show"	Bill Persky	Story by : Anne Flett & Chuck Ranberg; Teleplay by : Bob Randall & Bill Persky	May 23, 1988	5024/558-100	10.8/19
For the 100th show of the series, the main actors from Kate & Allie reminisce about their favourite moments from the series, including a series of bloopers. NOTE: This is the final appearance of Ari Meyers on the show, appearing as herself with the rest of the cast during the retrospective.

=== Season 6 (1988–89) ===
No. overall	No. in season	Title	Directed by	Written by	Original release date	Prod. code	U.S. viewers (millions)	Rating/share (households)
101	1	"Wedding Belle Blues"	Linda Day	Anne Flett & Chuck Ranberg	December 11, 1988	6001/582-101	20.4	14.5/22
Allie and Bob finally get married, but not before both their parents interfere and make a shambles of the wedding rehearsal. NOTE: First episode that Ari Meyers' name is removed from the opening credits, although she hadn't been in an episode since "The Mouse That Squeaked" from the previous season until the season-ending "The Clip Show".
102	2	"Kate Gets Dumped"	Linda Day	Anne Flett & Chuck Ranberg	December 12, 1988	6002/582-102	17.2	12.7/19
Kate gets dumped by Ted for a woman who is more interested in conforming to his life goals (especially having kids) than Kate is.
103	3	"Allie Doesn't Live Here Anymore"	Linda Day	Anne Flett & Chuck Ranberg	December 19, 1988	6003/582-103	19.7	14.4/22
Kate takes in another roommate to help pay the rent...and she proceeds to get on Kate's nerves.
104	4	"The Odd Couples"	Linda Day	Anne Flett & Chuck Ranberg	December 26, 1988	6004/582-104	20.8	13.7/22
Allie takes Kate into her home for a few months while Bob is away in Washington. NOTE: Last episode with the Greenwich Village apartment.
105	5	"Anchor Away"	Linda Day	Saul Turteltaub & Bernie Orenstein	January 9, 1989	6005/582-105	19.6	14.4/21
While Bob is in Washington doing the nightly sports portion of the local news, Allie becomes concerned about the female anchor's apparent flirting with Bob on the air.
106	6	"Better Never Than Late"	Linda Day	Saul Turteltaub & Bernie Orenstein	January 16, 1989	6007/582-107	19.6	14.6/22
Allie becomes worried when she starts to believe that Bob wants to have children with her.
107	7	"Moving On"	Linda Day	Laurie Newbound	January 23, 1989	6006/582-106	17.7	13.0/19
With an ex-husband with a hit television series and a daughter away at college, Kate decides to do something productive too...and join the Peace Corps in Africa.
108	8	"A Tree Grows on West 56th Street"	Linda Day	Jim Geoghan	January 30, 1989	6010/582-110	15.1	10.9/16
Kate organizes a protest group, but the more popular Allie is elected its president.
109	9	"The Nearlyweds"	Linda Day	M. Brett Schneider	February 6, 1989	6008/582-108	19.9	14.7/21
Jennie's move into the dorm and her new boyfriend, Ben, seems to be a perfect situation, according to Allie. But when an unexpected visit to the dorm reveals the truth about their relationship, the situation escalates into a possible wedding. Kate and Allie attempt to show Jennie and Ben that a rushed matrimony could lead to problems in their future, despite the young couple discovering a few truths beforehand. Guest star Dylan Walsh (Nip/Tuck) as Ben.
110	10	"Wanted: One Husband"	Linda Day	Jim Wells	February 13, 1989	6009/582-109	19.1	13.9/21
Kate and Allie's business brings them a rich penthouse client in their own building who wants a husband just like Bob. In a dream sequence, Allie devises a plan to divorce Bob, have him marry the client, and then divorce her in order to get the payment offered. However, even in a dream, things go hilariously awry and result in a murder! Guest star Cynthia Harris as Laurel Jordan.
111	11	"What's Love Got to Do with It?"	Linda Day	Kimberley Wells & Michael Lyons	February 20, 1989	6013/582-113	18.4	13.0/19
Allie and Bob try to set up Kate with a friend of Bob's named Tim, a successful television station owner. Allie believes he is perfect for Kate. After several dates, Kate discovers that, although Tim is a wonderful guy, she really doesn't feel anything for him. Despite her feelings, Kate still wants to pursue Tim and is hoping she will "learn to love him". Meanwhile, Chip falls for a girl in the building. Guest star Jay O. Sanders as Tim.
112	12	"I've Got a Secret"	Linda Day	Dana Persky	February 27, 1989	6012/582-112	14.4	11.6/20
Allie throws a party for Bob's peers, including a man who she once dated and is too embarrassed to admit it.
113	13	"Chip's Notes"	Linda Day	Michael Gordon	March 6, 1989	6011/582-111	17.9	12.9/19
Chip courts the cool crowd, but at the expense of being exploited into writing other students' term papers.
114	14	"Love Thy Neighbor"	Linda Day	Anne Flett & Chuck Ranberg	March 13, 1989	6015/582-115	17.6	13.1/20
A lovesick neighbor plays the piano.
115	15	"Trojan War"	Linda Day	Anne Flett & Chuck Ranberg	March 20, 1989	6016/582-116	15.6	11.9/20
Allie finds a condom in Chip's pocket.
116	16	"Loan-some Bob"	Linda Day	John Albert	March 27, 1989	6017/582-117	13.1	10.8/19
Bob loans money to Kate & Allie's catering business, but gets too opinionated about its expenses.
117	17	"The Review"	Linda Day	Saul Turteltaub & Bernie Orenstein	April 10, 1989	6014/582-114	16.9	13.3/23
A food critic dies of food poisoning.
118	18	"The Wedding"	Linda Day	Saul Turteltaub & Bernie Orenstein	April 24, 1989	6018/582-118	16.5	13.3/24
Lou is desperate to have Kate as a date.
119	19	"The Last Temptation of Allie"	Linda Day	Anne Flett & Chuck Ranberg	May 1, 1989	6019/582-119	16.0	12.1/21
Kate discovers that Lou is illiterate.
120	20	"Hockey Team"	Linda Day	Helen Barrett	May 8, 1989	6021/582-121	16.1	12.3/20
Bob consents to Chip playing hockey. Susie Essman (credited as Sussie Essman) featured as mother in hockey scene.
121	21	"My Boyfriend's Back"	Maureen Thorp	Cynthia Heimel	May 15, 1989	6020/582-120	14.2	10.9/19
An English professor (Franc Luz) who once dated Allie invites her to his new play, but goes out with Kate instead. The storyline was similar to that of Season 3's "Allie's Affair."
122	22	"What a Wonderful Episode" "It's a Wonderful Episode a.k.a. Kate and Allie Go to Hell"	Linda Day	Anne Flett & Chuck Ranberg	May 22, 1989	6022/582-122	14.9	11.9/20
A mysterious potential client (Christopher Murney) haunts both Kate and Allie by granting each their wishes in their dreams.
