= Twilight tower =

A twilight tower (often referred to collectively as Twilight Towers) is a telecommunications tower constructed in the United States between March 16, 2001 and March 7, 2005 that was not credited with having undergone review under Section 106 of the National Historic Preservation Act. This could be due to both no review occurring, or simply lack of documentation indicating a review, and resulted in towers not being eligible for collocation as earlier towers had. The matter was addressed at the December 14, 2017 Federal Communications Commission meeting, where public comment was requested on excluding the towers from normal historical review. The FCC stated that already constructed towers were unlikely to cause harm to the environment or historical sites, and thus could be exempt undergoing review.
