= Douglas Denoff =

American theater producer (born 1957)

- Born: July 14, 1957 (age 69); New York, NY
- Occupation: Theatre producer
- Parent(s): Bernice Levey Denoff; Sam Denoff
- Family: Sharon Shore (step-mother)
- Awards: Tony Award for Best Play; Drama Desk Award

Douglas Denoff (born July 14, 1957) is an American theatre producer, specializing in Broadway musicals. He received a Tony Award for Best Play in 2024 and a Drama Desk Award in 2008. Denoff also formed Dencom Systems, Inc. and Fibernet, Inc.

== Career ==
Denoff began his entertainment career in 1977 as the assistant to the producers of the CBS television series Hawaii Five-O, ultimately working as the associate producer overseeing post-production. In 1980, he worked as the line producer of the ABC Television film A Time for Miracles.

While working from home in the era before call-waiting and needing multiple phone lines, he salvaged an unused multi-line phone system for his own use. He subsequently formed Dencom Systems, Inc., a telephone interconnect company that installed business phone systems for commercial clients in the Los Angeles area. In 1992, Denoff formed an affiliated company, Fibernet, Inc. to resell the long-distance services of major carriers and provide statements. In 2003, Denoff began to downsize the company before relocating back to New York City.

Denoff received his first Tony nomination in 2008 as a producer of The 39 Steps, which opened on January 15, 2008. He received a Drama Desk Award in 2008 for Unique Theatrical Experience for The 39 Steps. He was also lead producer on the off-Broadway revival of 39 Steps, which began performances at the Union Square Theatre on April 1, 2015, and ran until January 3, 2016.

Denoff received his second Tony nomination as a co-producer of the 2012 musical Nice Work If You Can Get It. In 2016, he was a co-producer of the hit revival of Fiddler on the Roof at the Broadway Theatre, for which he received his third Tony nomination as a co-producer. He also co-produced David Mamet's China Doll starring Al Pacino. In 2017–2018 he was a co-producer of John Leguizamo's Latin History for Morons, for which he received his 4th Tony nomination.

Beginning in 2018, Denoff was a co-producer of the musical Pretty Woman, which opened on August 16, 2018, and ran until August 18, 2019, before going on tour. Denoff received his fifth Tony nomination for co-producing the revival of Harvey Fierstein's Torch Song at the Second Stage Theater, which ran through January 6, 2019. He also co-produced the play American Son by Christopher Demos-Brown, which ran from November 4, 2018, through January 27, 2019, and was then adapted for film by Netflix.

In 2019, Denoff was a co-producer of Slave Play by Jeremy O. Harris. He also co-produced Sea Wall/A Life starring Jake Gyllenhaal and Tom Sturridge, which had a limited nine-week run at the Hudson Theatre. Both plays received Tony nominations for Best Play. Also in 2019, he was nominated for Broadway Global's Producer of the Year Award.

Slave Play returned in 2021 for a limited run at the August Wilson Theatre. Denoff was a coproducer of The Sign in Sidney Brustein's Window by Lorraine Hansberry and the return engagement of Take Me Out in 2022, which was nominated for the Tony Award for Best Play Revival.

Denoff was the lead producer of a Broadway musical entertainment, That's Broadway! The Moves, The Music, The Magic, with American Dance Machine for the 21st Century. Denoff produced The Lucky Star, by Karen Hartman, which ran on Broadway from November 11, 2022, through February 5, 2023.

He co-produced Stereophonic, which ran on Broadway from April 19, 2024, to January 12, 2025, and won the Tony Award for Best Play. This was followed by his production of Left on Tenth, which opened on October 23, 2024. He also co-produced John Proctor is the Villain, which ran on Broadway from April 14, 2025, to September 7, 2025, and was nominated for a Tony Award for Best Play. Next, he co-produced Real Women Have Curves: The Musical, which ran from April 27, 2025, to June 29, 2025. His production of the musical Dead Outlaw ran from April 27, 2025, to June 29, 2025, and was nominated for a Tony Award for Best Musical.

Denoff belongs to the Academy of Television Arts & Sciences, The Broadway League, the Broadway Producers Alliance, and The Recording Academy.

== Personal life ==
Denoff is the son of television writer/producer Sam Denoff and his first wife Bernice Levey. He had a sister who died in 2022, and two half siblings from his father's second marriage to dancer Sharon Shore. He lives in New York City and Bridgehampton.
