= Fibernet Corp. =

American internet service provider

- Type: privately held
- Industry: Internet service provider, colocation provider
- Founded: 1994
- Headquarters: Orem, Utah
- Number of employees: 30 (2009)
- Website: fiber.net

Fibernet Corp. is an American Internet service and colocation provider based in Orem, Utah. Founded in 1994, the ISP was one of Utah's first colocation service companies. Fibernet provides service to Utah companies and residents.

In 2002, Fibernet completed construction of a data center facility and was the first ISP in Utah to become PCI DSS-compliant through the independent auditing company Cadence Group.

Fibernet Corp.'s services include colocation, dedicated hosting, VPS, and virtual hosting, both commercial and residential. Fibernet also leases onsite and virtual office suites.

== History ==
Fibernet began in 1994 with a primary focus on residential internet service, but in 1996, it expanded its product line to include internet services for businesses. In 1998, Fibernet created an international brand, Nethosting.com (d.b.a. NetHosting), to reach a broader market.

With the creation of NetHosting, Fibernet expanded its product line to include Dedicated, VPS, Virtual Hosting, and a cloud computing platform.

== Involvement with other companies ==
Nethosting.com (d.b.a. NetHosting) is a wholly owned subsidiary of Fibernet Corp. Fibernet maintains direct fiber connections to Zayo, Verizon, Lumen, Comcast, Centracom, and UTOPIA, as well as local municipalities such as American Fork City.

NetHosting took over the dedicated, VPS, virtual, and cloud hosting product lines that Fibernet was offering. The ISP is one of the oldest colocation facilities in Utah, and offers include application hosting, colocation, managed services, e-commerce, and SEO services. It also offers internet service to business and residential locations, as well as internet security, filtering, and carrier services. NetHosting runs its services out of Fibernet's on-site data center, completed in 2002. The Fibernet data center is contained in a Class A SMART building that is designed to Zone 4 earthquake specifications.

To reduce energy usage, in 2010 Fibernet installed motion-sensor lighting, and more efficient UPS systems. Fibernet also made use of a more efficient cooling system for use within the datacenter during the cooler months of the year.

Other acquisitions include:

- 1995—Infonaut
- 1998—Cyber-Naut and Nethosting.com
- 1999—Shadowlink
- 2000—Inet-1

== Data center ==
The Fibernet data center is contained in a Class A SMART building that is designed to Zone 4 earthquake specifications. Its Green initiatives have included the installation of sensored lighting, upgraded UPS systems, and the utilization of energy-efficient, high-performance servers. Fibernet has also made use of an intuitive cooling system that recycles outside temperatures for use within the data center during the cooler months of the year.

== Sponsored organizations ==
The company sponsors various non-profit organizations, community-oriented programs, and business development projects locally and nationally, including the Utah Valley Chamber of Commerce, United Way of Utah County, Habitat for Humanity, and Great Strides, a national fundraising event run by the Cystic Fibrosis Foundation.
