= Kate & Allie =

American sitcom

- Main title screen
- Genre: Sitcom
- Created by: Sherry Coben
- Directed by: Bill Persky (Seasons 1–5); Linda Day (Season 6)
- Starring: Susan Saint James; Jane Curtin; Ari Meyers; Frederick Koehler; Allison Smith
- Theme music composer: Ralph Schuckett
- Opening theme: "Along Comes a Friend" performed by John Loeffler
- Composers: John Loeffler; Ralph Schuckett
- Country of origin: United States
- Original language: English
- No. of seasons: 6
- No. of episodes: 122 (list of episodes)

Production
- Executive producers: Merrill Grant; Mort Lachman; Bernie Orenstein
- Producers: Anne Flett; Bill Persky; Chuck Ranberg; Bob Randall; Saul Turteltaub
- Camera setup: Multi-camera
- Running time: 24 minutes
- Production companies: Alan Landsburg Productions (1984–1985) (seasons 1–2); Reeves Entertainment Group (1985–1989) (seasons 3–6); Universal Television

Original release
- Network: CBS
- Release: March 19, 1984 – May 22, 1989

Related
- Roxie

Kate & Allie is an American sitcom television series that aired on CBS from March 19, 1984, to May 22, 1989, starring Susan Saint James and Jane Curtin as two divorced mothers who decided to live together and raise their children in the same home. The series was created by Sherry Coben.

== Overview ==
The show stars Susan Saint James as the free-spirited Kate McArdle and Jane Curtin as her more conservative childhood friend, Allie Lowell. After both women divorce, they decide to share a brownstone in New York City's Greenwich Village and raise their families together.

The show also starred Ari Meyers as Kate's daughter Emma, and Frederick Koehler and Allison Smith as Allie's children Chip and Jennie.

Both Kate and Allie were portrayed as independent, smart women. Kate and Allie dated men regularly and were shown as wise to romantic games, but not averse to remarrying if the opportunity presented itself.

Kate & Allie first aired on CBS as a mid-season replacement series and only six episodes were initially commissioned, but the favorable response from critics and viewers alike (its first episode ranked number 4 out of all the television shows airing that week) easily persuaded CBS to commit to a full season in the fall of 1984. The show was one of the most popular and critically acclaimed sitcoms of the 1980s, consistently ranking in the Top 20 shows until its final season. Curtin won two consecutive Emmy Awards for Best Actress in a Comedy Series, out of 3 nominations and Saint James was nominated in the same category two times.

Curtin and Saint James had previously worked together in the 1980 movie How to Beat the High Cost of Living.

At the beginning of the series, Kate was a travel agent and Allie worked to care for household's domestic needs and returned to college to complete the degree she had abandoned during her marriage. In the show's fifth season, Kate quit her job and teamed up with Allie to start a catering service.

In the show's penultimate season, Allie dated Bob Barsky (Sam Freed), a television sportscaster who proposed to Allie in the season finale. In the final season, now-married Allie and Bob moved into a new apartment. Bob, however, took a job that involved regular travel and his frequent absences provided a reason for Kate to move into the new apartment too. This plot development, frequently cited as one of the canonical examples of a television show jumping the shark, led viewers to lose interest and CBS chose not to renew Kate & Allie for a seventh season.

== Episodes ==
Season	Episodes	Originally released	
Season	Episodes	First released	Last released
1	6	March 19, 1984	May 7, 1984
2	22	October 8, 1984	May 6, 1985
3	23	September 30, 1985	May 12, 1986
4	25	September 22, 1986	May 18, 1987
5	24	September 14, 1987	May 23, 1988
6	22	December 11, 1988	May 22, 1989

== Cast and characters ==
=== Main cast ===
- Susan Saint James as Katherine "Kate" Elizabeth Ann (née Hanlan) McArdle
- Jane Curtin as Allison "Allie" Julia Charlotte (née Adams) Lowell
- Ari Meyers as Emma McArdle, Kate's daughter. Meyers left the show a few episodes into the fifth season to attend Yale University (although her name remained in the opening credits to the end of the season); she returned for the season-ending 100th episode retrospective, but did not appear in the sixth season.
- Allison Smith as Jennie Lowell, Allie's daughter of similar age to Emma
- Frederick Koehler as Charles "Chip" Lowell, Allie's son
- Sam Freed as Bob Barsky, Allie's boyfriend who became her husband in Season 6. He was a sportscaster after retiring as a professional football player. Freed also played different characters in two separate episodes. In the second season he played a married candidate for office named Johnathan Conti who flirts with Allie. At the end of season three he played Keith in the episode "Late Bloomers", which was a backdoor pilot for a proposed spinoff which would have starred Lindsay Wagner.
- Peter Onorati as Lou Carello, the superintendent in Kate and Allie's new apartment building in Season 6. He tries unsuccessfully to win Kate's affections.

=== Recurring cast ===
- Greg Salata as Ted Bartelo, a plumber whom Kate gets involved with during the second season. The two break up in the season two finale. Ted returns for the fifth season, with he and Kate attempting to rekindle their relationship; by the end of this season, he is gone again.
- Paul Hecht as Dr. Charles Lowell, Allie's sometimes pompous ex-husband
- Harley Venton (previously John Heard) as Max McArdle, Kate's ex-husband
- Jack Gilpin as Roger, Kate & Allie's next-door neighbor during the series' first two seasons
- Michael Countryman as Louis, Chip's adult friend who has an intellectual disability
- Wendie Malick as Claire Lowell, Charles' new wife
- Alan North as Mr. Sloan, Kate's boss at the travel agency

Notable guest stars included Ben Stiller, Kelsey Grammer, William H. Macy, Lindsay Wagner, Mercedes Ruehl, Ricki Lake, Dick Cavett, Patricia Richardson, Barbara Barrie, Paul Gleason, Rosemary Murphy, Andrea Martin, John Heard, Debra Jo Rupp, Marilyn Cooper, Susie Essman, Joe Namath, Christa Miller (star Susan St. James' real-life niece), and Peggy Pope.

== Spin-offs ==
Kate & Allie gave birth to the spin-off Roxie, a comedy that aired twice on CBS's schedule, on April 1 and 8, 1987. Roxie starred Andrea Martin as New York City TV programmer Roxie Brinkerhoff, who balanced her professional life at local UHF station WNYV with her married life. Martin had previously appeared as a similar version of the character, named Eddie Gordon, on two episodes of Kate & Allie ("Stage Mother", which aired December 1, 1986, and in "The Goodbye Girl", December 8, 1986), in which she was a friend of Allie's who worked as a producer on low-viewership public-access Channel G.

Another attempted spin-off was Late Bloomer, which was scheduled to be a midseason replacement in January 1987. Based on the similarly named Season 3 episode that guest starred Lindsay Wagner, the series was scrapped the day before its January 19, 1987, debut, which was an encore presentation of its backdoor pilot.

== Production ==
The cast of Kate & Allie

The test name for the script was entitled Two Mommies and was seized upon by Saint James who was able to use the show as a way to work without relocating her family from Litchfield, Connecticut. Curtin initially was not interested in doing the sitcom, but after speaking with director Bill Persky she decided to take the role. Kate & Allie was taped on soundstages constructed at the Ed Sullivan Theater (CBS Studio 50) and also at the Teletape Studios at West 81st Street and Broadway in New York City, which at the time was the production facility for Sesame Street.

Cold opening dialog sequences between Saint James and Curtin documenting city life were featured, shot on location in Manhattan with no laugh track. The theme song played instrumentally over the title shot of the Empire State Building (the first season's titles opened in a different outdoor location per episode). Closing credits also included vocals with indicative lyrics, "just when you think/you're all by yourself/you're not."

Under pressure from higher-ups at CBS to quash the suggestion that Kate and Allie were lesbians, the producers were instructed to show Kate and Allie entering separate bedrooms to sleep at the end of each episode. That pressure may have been the impetus for an episode showing Kate and Allie pretending to be lesbians when faced with a large rent increase.

Saint James was pregnant during the taping of the fourth season. Her pregnancy was hidden by taping her behind a desk, under a sheet in a hospital bed, or in a bubble bath, outside a flashback scene showing Kate and Allie both pregnant with their children.

An episode broadcast in 1987, produced in cooperation with the Coalition for the Homeless, was taped almost entirely outdoors, on the streets of Manhattan. The episode was prompted by the absence of Saint James, who was undergoing and recovering from kidney stone removal, and featured Allie struggling to find a way home after accidentally leaving her keys and money in a taxi.

The show's sixth and final season had been picked up with a number of other returning CBS shows for midseason premieres, and the show's end was confirmed by its exclusion from CBS' 1989–90 fall schedule announced on May 19, 1989.

== Ratings ==
Following are the Nielsen ratings for the show:

- 1983–1984: #8
- 1984–1985: #17
- 1985–1986: #14
- 1986–1987: #19
- 1987–1988: #38
- 1988–1989: #48

According to an essay by Christine R. Catron from the Museum of Broadcast Communications's Encyclopedia of Television, the decline in ratings for the show's last season is attributable to the fact that the show's premise had been fulfilled at the end of the previous season, when Allie accepted Bob Barsky's marriage proposal.

== Syndication ==
The American syndication rights are held by NBCUniversal Syndication Studios, the successor to the original distributor, MCA Television; the show aired on RTN. Kate & Allie previously aired on WE tv, from 2007 to 2008. Fremantle owns the international rights, as they own Thames Television and have access to the Reeves Entertainment product.

== Reboot ==
In January 2021, it was announced that NBC had given a put pilot commitment to a reboot of the series. It was to be produced by Fierce Baby Production, Propagate, and Universal Television with Erica Oyama writing and co-executive producing with Nahnatchka Khan, Ben Silverman, Howard T. Owens, Rodney Ferrell, Gregory Lipstone, Peter Principato, Jen Carreras, and Brian Dobbins. As of August 2026 the pilot has not been filmed.

== Home media ==
=== United States ===
Universal Studios Home Entertainment (now Universal Pictures Home Entertainment, or UPHE) released the first season of Kate & Allie on DVD exclusively in the United States in May 2006. The extras include a blooper reel, a six-minute interview with Bill Persky and Susan Saint James and a bonus episode from Season Two.

On 23 May 2023, UPHE released the complete series on DVD.

=== Canada ===
For the Canadian market, Visual Entertainment (under license from Fremantle), has released all six seasons on DVD. On May 4, 2010, VEI released Kate & Allie: The Complete Series, a 16-disc boxset featuring all 122 episodes of the series. Neither release include any extras.

DVD name	Ep #	Release date
The Complete First & Second Seasons	28	June 6, 2006
The Complete Third Season	23	February 6, 2007
The Complete Fourth Season	25	July 3, 2007
The Complete Fifth Season	24	September 9, 2008
The Complete Sixth and Final Season	22	November 3, 2009
The Complete Series	122	May 4, 2010
