= That Girl =

American television sitcom (1966–1971)

- Genre: Sitcom
- Created by: Bill Persky; Sam Denoff
- Starring: Marlo Thomas; Ted Bessell; Lew Parker; Bernie Kopell; Rosemary DeCamp
- Theme music composer: Sam Denoff; Earle Hagen
- Opening theme: "That Girl" Theme Song
- Composers: Warren Barker; Luchi De Jesus; Dominic Frontiere; Harry Geller; Earle Hagen; Walter Scharf; Carl Brandt
- Country of origin: United States
- Original language: English
- No. of seasons: 5
- No. of episodes: 136 (list of episodes)

Production
- Executive producers: Sam Denoff; Bill Persky; Marlo Thomas
- Producers: Danny Arnold; Jerry Davis; Sam Denoff; Bernie Orenstein; Bill Persky; Saul Turteltaub
- Camera setup: Single camera
- Running time: 23–25 minutes
- Production company: Daisy Productions

Original release
- Network: ABC
- Release: September 8, 1966 – March 19, 1971

That Girl is an American television sitcom that ran on ABC from September 8, 1966, to March 19, 1971. It starred Marlo Thomas as the title character, Ann Marie, an aspiring (but only sporadically employed) actress who moves from her hometown of Brewster, New York, to try to make it big in New York City. Ann has to take a number of offbeat temp jobs to support herself in between her various auditions and bit parts.

It was one of the first sitcoms to focus on an unmarried woman who was not a domestic or living with her parents, a forerunner of The Mary Tyler Moore Show.

Ted Bessell played her boyfriend Donald Hollinger, a writer for Newsview Magazine. Lew Parker and Rosemary DeCamp played Lew Marie and Helen Marie, her concerned parents. Bernie Kopell played Jerry, Don's best friend and work colleague. That Girl was developed by writers Bill Persky and Sam Denoff, who had served as head writers on The Dick Van Dyke Show (which Thomas' father, Danny Thomas, co-produced) earlier in the 1960s.

== Premise ==
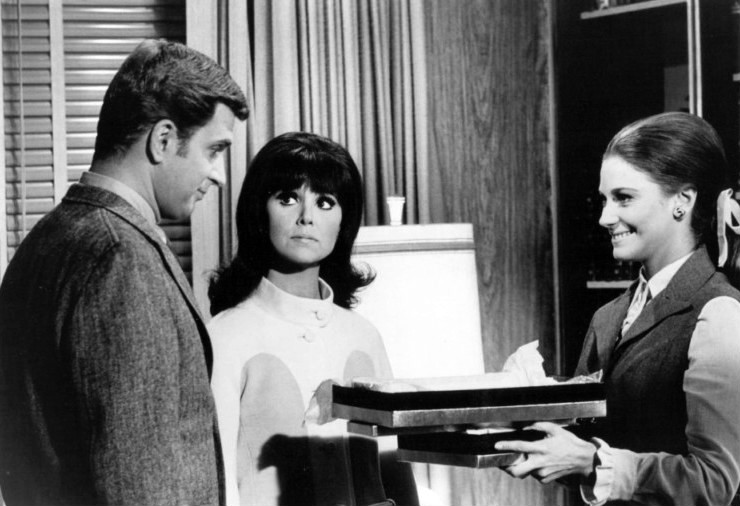
Marlo Thomas (center) with co-star Ted Bessell (left) and guest star Mary Frann (right), in a scene from the show, 1968

The show reflected the changing roles of American women in 1960s-era feminism. Thomas' goofy charm, together with Bessell's dry wit, made That Girl a solid performer on the ABC Television Network, although the series never made the top thirty during its entire five-year run.

At the end of the 1969–1970 season, That Girl was still doing moderately well in the ratings, but after four years Thomas had grown tired of the series and wanted to move on. ABC convinced her to do one more year. In the beginning of the fifth season, Don and Ann became engaged, but they never actually married. The decision to leave the couple engaged at the end of the run was largely the idea of Thomas. She did not want to send a message to young women that marriage was the ultimate goal for them, and she worried that it would have undercut the somewhat feminist message of the show.

== Intro ==
Every episode started with a small cold open; the dialogue would always turn to Ann, as one of the characters would make an assertive reference to her as "that girl"; the camera would freeze frame on a surprised Ann. This was followed by the opening credits and theme music (written by Earle Hagen). During the first four seasons, the theme song was instrumental only; in the fifth and final season, lyrics (written by Denoff) were added.

In season one, episodes 19, 23 and 27, there is a variation in the opening sequence, in which Thomas aids a toddler at a water fountain. Afterwards, the introduction continues as with the first 18 episodes. It is unclear why this variation occurs.

== Production notes ==
According to Marlo Thomas, she was approached by ABC executive Edgar Scherick, who saw her in a screen test for a failed pilot, but still wanted to feature her in a project. Scherick gave Thomas several scripts to read, none of which she liked, as they all focused on a woman who was either a traditional girlfriend, wife or secretary to someone else; Thomas wanted a show in which the main character was a young, modern woman focused on her dreams and aspirations.

Although never officially credited as such (Persky and Denoff were the series' creators and official executive producers), Thomas was also a de facto executive producer of the series through her Daisy Productions, which she formed specifically for the series; it was credited on-screen as the production company. She originally wanted to name the sitcom Miss Independence, the nickname given to her by her parents.

Manhattan exterior shots were filmed in several days. Initially, the apartment was located off the East River on the Upper East Side, in the former East End Hotel (originally known as the Junior League Hotel for Working Women) at 78th Street and the FDR Drive, as seen in several first-season episodes, including "What's in a Name" where Ann can be seen exiting a taxicab. In the episode entitled "That Señorita", Ann lists her address as 627 East 54th Street. In the second season - with a new exterior - in the episode "Nothing to Be Afreud of but Freud Himself", Donald gives out her address as 344 West 78th Street, Apartment D. Ann's acting school was modeled after the Neighborhood Playhouse School of the Theatre on East 54th Street between First and Second Avenues. That Girl was filmed at Desilu-Cahuenga Studios (for many years called Ren-Mar Studios and now called Red Studios Hollywood), located at 846 North Cahuenga Boulevard in Hollywood.

== Characters ==
- Ann Marie (Marlo Thomas), a beautiful young would-be actress from Brewster, New York, who moves to New York City in order to seek stardom, often tries to balance temporary jobs and auditions with having a boyfriend.
- Donald Hollinger (Ted Bessell), writer for NewsView magazine, who becomes Ann's boyfriend after meeting her working in the lobby of the building where he works.
- Lew Marie (Harold Gould pilot only; Lew Parker), Ann's father and the owner of the La Parisienne restaurant in Brewster, New York.
- Helen Marie (Penny Santon pilot only; Rosemary DeCamp), Ann's mother.
- Dr. Leon Bessemer (Dabney Coleman), a neighbor of Ann and an obstetrician.
- Judy Bessemer (Bonnie Scott), Leon's wife and Ann's neighbor, the first person Ann meets as she moves into her new apartment.
- Jerry Bauman (Bernie Kopell), a fellow employee of Donald's at NewsView magazine. After the first season, Jerry and Ruth lived next door to Ann in Apt. C.
- Margie Bauman (Arlene Golonka), Jerry's wife in the episode "Rain, Snow and Rice" in the first season.
- Ruth Bauman (Carol Ann Daniels), Jerry's wife for the second and third seasons (starting in the season 2 episode "Pass the Potatoes, Ethel Merman", and ending in the season 3 episode, "The Earrings").
- Ruth Bauman (Alice Borden), Jerry's wife beginning in the episode "Write is Wrong" in the fourth season.
- Margie "Pete" Peterson (Ruth Buzzi), a friend of Ann.
- Harvey Peck (Ronnie Schell), one of Ann's agents at the Gilliam and Norris Theatrical Agency.
- George Lester (George Carlin), another one of Ann's agents in a single episode.
- Mildred Hollinger (Mabel Albertson), Donald's mother.
- Bert Hollinger (George Cisar, later Frank Faylen), Donald's father.
- Jules Benedict (Billy De Wolfe), head of the Benedict Workshop of the Dramatic Arts.
- Marcy (Reva Rose), friend of Ann's who appears in four episodes in season 5.

== Episodes ==
Five complete seasons of That Girl aired, with the series finale airing on March 19, 1971. Over the five seasons, a total of 136 episodes aired. Thomas' sister Terre, her brother Tony, and father Danny Thomas all appeared in a 1969 episode called "My Sister's Keeper".

Season	Episodes	Originally released		Rank
Season	Episodes	First released	Last released	Rank
Pilot		April 29, 1996 (on TV Land)		TBA
1	30	September 8, 1966	April 6, 1967	57
2	30	September 7, 1967	April 25, 1968	TBA
3	26	September 26, 1968	March 27, 1969	44
4	26	September 18, 1969	March 26, 1970	48
5	24	September 25, 1970	March 19, 1971	TBA

=== Pilot ===
The only episode never shown during the series' original network run was the pilot produced in 1965. The major differences were evident in its opening credits. Bessell's character was Don Blue Sky, Ann's talent agent who was part Cherokee, and Harold Gould and Penny Santon played her parents. By the time the series aired on ABC, Thomas and Bessell were the only actors to receive top billing.

The pilot episode centered on Ann's attempt to adopt a stage name based on her agent's suggestion. After her use of "Marie Brewster" (the names of her family and hometown combined) was met with disapproval from her parents, she decided to not make the change in the end. This storyline and numerous scenes were recycled into the 11th episode of Season 1 titled "What's in a Name?" from November 17, 1966.

The pilot was included in the 5-disc set of That Girl: Season One, which was released by Shout! Factory in 2006. It has since been added to the series' broadcast syndication package; it led off a New Year's Day marathon on MeTV at the start of 2012.

=== Syndication and home media ===
ABC aired reruns of the show on its daytime schedule from June 1969 to March 1972. Reruns have aired on TV Land from the network's launch in 1996 to 1998. On January 1, 2012, That Girl reruns returned to national television on MeTV with episodes shown on weekday mornings and Sunday afternoons until September 1, 2013. On September 1, 2014, the show returned to MeTV. The series is currently distributed by Paul Brownstein Productions. From January 2, 2020, to December 31, 2023, the show aired on Antenna TV. Starting September 2, 2024, it currently airs on Catchy Comedy. It also currently airs on MeTV+ as of January 3, 2026. The series is currently available on Tubi.

Shout! Factory has released all five seasons on DVD in Region 1. Each release contains extensive bonus features including episodic promos, featurettes, commentary tracks and the original pilot episode.

In Region 4, Madman Entertainment has released all five seasons on DVD in Australia/New Zealand. On April 21, 2010, Madman released That Girl: The Complete Series, a 21-disc box set that features all 136 episodes, as well as extensive bonus features.

== Tie-in novelization ==
- Paul W. Fairman, That Girl, New York: Popular Library, 1971. 125 pp.

Newly engaged Ann travels to Maine to take the role of Cathy in a production of Wuthering Heights but finds herself embroiled in a real-life gothic.

== Spin-offs ==
In 1973, Rankin/Bass produced That Girl in Wonderland, an animated television special in which Marlo Thomas reprised the role of Ann. It aired as an episode of The ABC Saturday Superstar Movie on January 13, 1973. The special also featured the voices of Patricia Bright, Dick Hehmeyer, Rhoda Mann, and Ted Schwartz.

== Popular culture ==
The series' theme song and opening visuals have been parodied in pop culture several times. They appeared as a series of T-shirts, then as a Saturday Night Live sketch featuring Danitra Vance in an African American remake titled "That Black Girl", and as a sequence on episodes of Animaniacs, The Simpsons, Family Guy, Clarissa Explains It All, Arthur, Friends (Note: Phoebe wears a That Girl T-shirt during the football game in a Thanksgiving episode (Season 3, Episode 9).) and Roseanne.

The 2011 advertising campaign for the launch of Fox's sitcom New Girl featured posters of that sitcom's star, Zooey Deschanel, in the make-up, pose and graphic look of Marlo Thomas from the original That Girl series.
