= Joan Roberts =

American actress (1917–2012)

- Roberts in 1945
- Born: Josephine Rose Seagrist; July 15, 1917; New York City, U.S.
- Died: August 13, 2012 (aged 95); Stamford, Connecticut, U.S.
- Occupation: Actress
- Years active: 1941–2011
- Spouse: John J. Donlon
- Children: 1

Joan Roberts (July 15, 1917 – August 13, 2012) was an American actress, most famous for creating the role of Laurey in the original Broadway production of Oklahoma! in 1943.

== Early years ==
Roberts was born Josephine Rose Seagrist in Manhattan, New York and was raised in Astoria, Queens. She first appeared on stage at age 6. She was active in dramatic productions as a student at St. Patrick's Cathedral (Manhattan) High School and gained additional experience in summer stock productions. She studied singing with Estelle Liebling, the teacher of Beverly Sills, in her youth.

== Career ==
=== Radio ===
Roberts was a regular on The Texaco Summer Theater on CBS July 4 - December 5, 1943. The program was a summer replacement for The Fred Allen Show but was extended when Allen did not return as scheduled.

=== Stage ===
Sunny River was Roberts' first Broadway production. She played Madeleine Caresse December 4, 1941 - January 3, 1942. Later in 1942 she played in Hit the Deck with the Los Angeles Civic Light Opera.

Roberts initially auditioned for the role of Ado Annie in the original Broadway production of Oklahoma! (which eventually went to Celeste Holm), but the show's librettist Oscar Hammerstein cast her as the female lead, Laurey. At the time of her death she was one of four surviving cast members of the original 1943 opening night production of Oklahoma! and the only one who played a principal role (Celeste Holm died several weeks earlier), along with George S. Irving, Marc Platt, and Bambi Linn. Roberts subsequently starred as Sara Longstreet on Broadway in the musical High Button Shoes.

In addition to her work as an actress, Roberts taught voice lessons and presented workshops on singing and voice projection. In 2011 the University of North Carolina's School of the Arts mounted a production of Oklahoma! that replicated the original Broadway staging of the show. Roberts and Celeste Holm both attended that production and were present at an event honoring the two actresses.

She was in retirement for many years on Long Island, New York, when she appeared as Heidi Schiller in the 2001 Broadway revival of Stephen Sondheim's Follies. Over the years she was seen in documentaries about Oscar Hammerstein II, George Abbott and in the film Broadway: The Golden Age, by the Legends Who Were There.

=== Television ===
On December 19, 1966, Roberts appeared in a production of Jack and the Beanstalk on CBS-TV.

In 1977 on the Series Emergency! S6 E15 “Breakdown”, she made an appearance as Jane.

== Personal life ==
Roberts was married to Dr. John J. Donlon, who died in 1965. They had a son, John J. Donlon, Jr.

== Death ==
On August 13, 2012, Roberts died of congestive heart failure, aged 95, according to her son.

Celeste Holm, who played Ado Annie in the same original production of Oklahoma!, had died only a month before, also at age 95.

== Stage ==
- Sunny River - 1941-1942
- Oklahoma! - 1943-1945
- Marinka - 1945
- Are You with It? (musical) - 1945-1946
- High Button Shoes - 1947-1949 (preceded by Nanette Fabray)
- Follies - 2001

== Film ==
- The Model and the Marriage Broker (1951)
- Lovely to Look at (1952)

== Partial discography ==
- Joan Roberts Sings of Faith, Hope and Love - Aardvark Records

== Book ==
- Never Alone by Joan Roberts (McMullen Books Inc., 1954)
