= Sharon Shore =

American actress

- Occupations: Dancer; Model
- Spouse: Sam Denoff
- Family: Douglas Denoff (stepson)

Sharon Shore is a dancer in ballet, musical comedy theater, opera, and television. She has been photographed as a model.

== Ballet ==
In March 1950 Shore was one of five dancers from Oakland to perform with the San Francisco Ballet in the Hayes Street (High School of Commerce) auditorium. She appeared in Romeo and Juliet and Vivaldi Concerto. In May 1953 she was in a troupe of players who danced in a ballet entitled Ballentine. She played the part of a queen in The Creatures of Prometheus in October 1953 presented by the Los Angeles Opera. Choreographed by Willam Christensen, Shore was among the court of Apollo, a role performed by John Mallozzi. Beverly Sills was in the cast.

== Theater ==
Bloomer Girl came to San Francisco in 1951 with Dick Haymes as its star. Shore was one of the dancers. She was in a production of the musical comedy The Thousand and Second Night in December 1955. The show was produced by Jack Yellen and featured actors Jack Cassidy and Eddie Lawrence. It was performed at the Versailles night club, 151 East 50th Street, New York City. Shore was successful in subbing for Neile Adams who was ill at one point. She also appeared at the Copacabana. She was a dancer in the original run of Li'l Abner. It appeared from November 15, 1956, to July 12, 1958, at the St. James Theatre on Broadway. There were 693 performances.

== Other ==
Shore was a member of the June Taylor Dancers on the Jackie Gleason Show in the 1950s. She appeared as Betti in a (1965) screen comedy called The Art of Love. Directed by Norman Jewison, the film was released by Cherokee Productions.

== Personal life ==
Shore was married to producer Sam Denoff; they had two children, Melissa Denoff and Matthew Denoff. She has two step-children from his first marriage, Leslie Denoff and producer Douglas Denoff.
