= Lew Parker =

American actor (1910–1972)

- Parker in That Girl, 1969
- Born: Austin Lewis Jacobs; October 29, 1907; Brooklyn, New York City, U.S.
- Died: October 27, 1972 (aged 64); Manhattan, New York City, U.S.
- Occupation: Actor
- Years active: 1929–1971
- Spouse: Betty Kean (m. 1956)

Lew Parker (born Austin Lewis Jacobs, October 29, 1907 – October 27, 1972) was an American television, stage and musical theatre actor. His most notable role was as Lew Marie, the arrogant, but doting, father of Marlo Thomas's character, Ann Marie, on the 1960s television series That Girl.

== Early years ==
Parker was born in Brooklyn and was the son of Lewis Jacobs, who performed in vaudeville.

== Acting ==
On Broadway, Parker appeared in Rainbow (1928), Spring is Here (1929), Heads Up! (1929), Girl Crazy (1930), Red, Hot and Blue (1936), Are You with It? (1945), The Front Page (1946), Ankles Aweigh (1955), Mr. Wonderful (1956), and A Funny Thing Happened on the Way to the Forum (1972).

On television, Parker appeared on one episode of the television series Gidget in 1966 as Mr. Socrates, the crusty proprietor of The Shaggy Dog, a hamburger restaurant that was a hangout for teenagers. Parker appeared in the television series F Troop in 1966, "The Ballot of Corporal Agarn" as George C Bragan. Parker's character is a mayoral candidate from Corporal Agarn's hometown in New Jersey, and he travels West to get Corporal Agarn's vote since the election was tied and Agarn's absentee ballot is needed to break the tie. From 1966-1971, he appeared in 63 episodes of That Girl as Lew Marie, the father of Marlo Thomas's character, Ann Marie. Parker also appeared in episodes of The Lucy Show and Here's Lucy.

== Personal life/death ==
In 1955, Parker married actress Betty Kean. They remained together until Parker's death from cancer in New York City on October 27, 1972. Betty Kean died on September 29, 1986, also from cancer.

== Filmography ==
| Year | Title | Role | Notes |
|---|---|---|---|
| 1921 | The Kid | Extra in Heaven Scene | Uncredited |
| 1948 | Are You with It? | Goldie McGoldrick | |
| 1958 | Country Music Holiday | Himself | |
