= Sam Denoff =

American television producer and writer

Samuel Denoff
- Born: July 1, 1928; Brooklyn, New York, U.S.
- Died: July 8, 2011 (aged 83); Brentwood, California, U.S.
- Occupations: Screenwriter, television producer
- Known for: The Dick Van Dyke Show; That Girl
- Spouses: Bernice Levey (m. 1950; div. 1964); Sharon Shore (m. 1965)
- Children: 4 including Douglas Denoff

Samuel Denoff (July 1, 1928 – July 8, 2011) was an American screenwriter and television producer.

== Biography ==
Denoff was born to a Jewish family in Brooklyn, New York, the son of Esther (Rothbard) and Harry Denoff, a salesman. With his long-time collaborator Bill Persky he wrote and created the television show That Girl starring Marlo Thomas. Their writing collaboration on episodes of The Dick Van Dyke Show resulted in some of the show's most popular episodes. Denoff also wrote for the 1976 Danny Thomas situation comedy The Practice.

== Personal life ==
Denoff married twice. His first wife was Bernice Levey; they had two children, Leslie Denoff and producer Douglas Denoff. His second wife was dancer Sharon Shore with whom he had two children, Melissa Denoff and Matthew Denoff. Denoff died from complications of Alzheimer's disease at his home in the Brentwood section of Los Angeles, at the age of 83.
