= Bonnie Scott =

American actress and singer

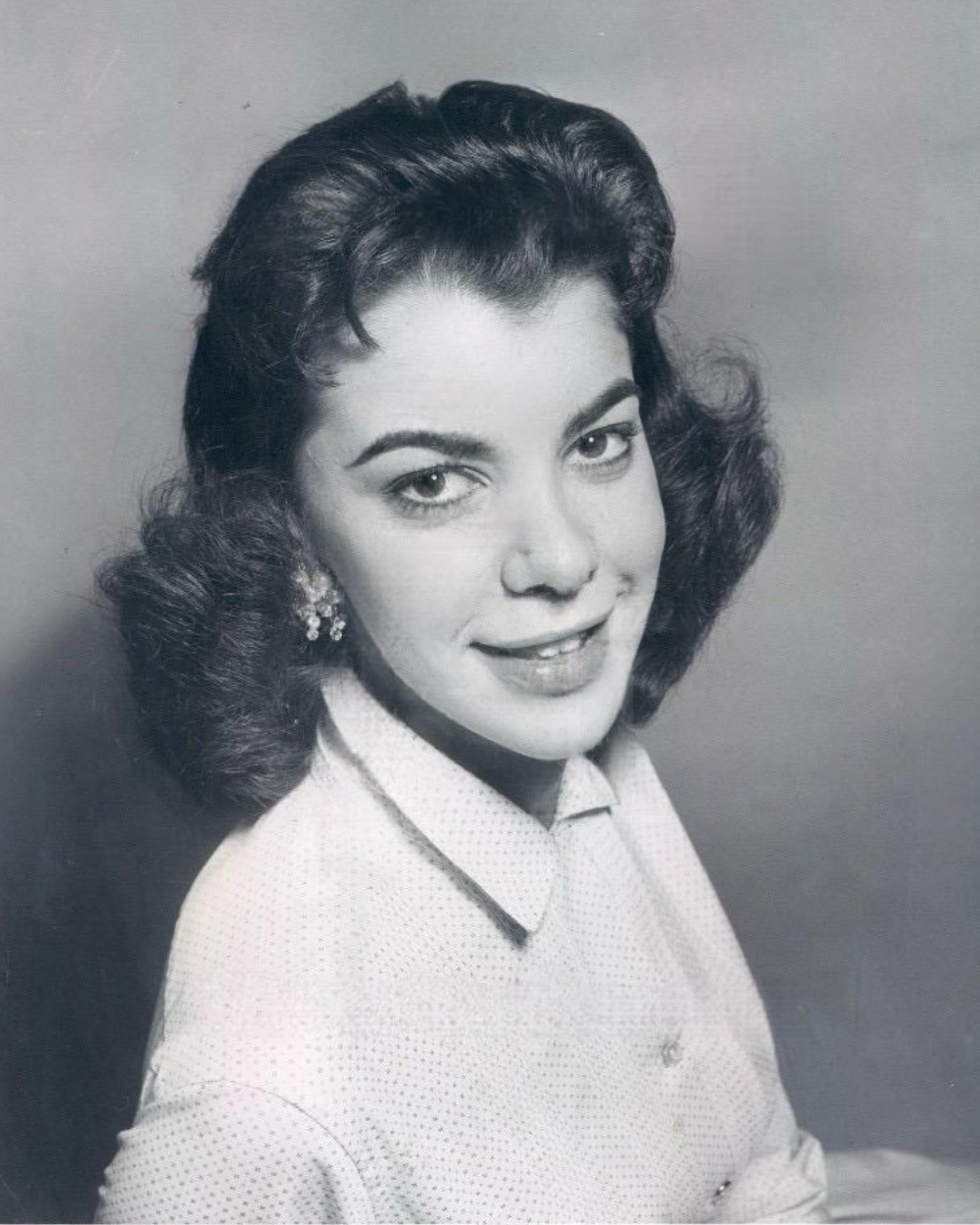
- Scott in 1957
- Born: February 20, 1941 (age 85); Philadelphia, Pennsylvania, U.S.
- Occupations: Actress, singer
- Years active: 1943–2019
- Musical career
- Label: RCA Records

Bonnie Scott (born February 20, 1941) is a retired American actress and singer. She is best known for being the original female lead in the hit Broadway musical How to Succeed in Business Without Really Trying while at the age of only 20. Later she played Judy Bessemer during the first season of the ABC sitcom That Girl.

== Early life ==
Scott was born in Philadelphia, Pennsylvania on February 20, 1941, the younger of two children born to Albert and Blanche Paul. Her elder brother was named Jordan.

== Career ==
Scott began her professional career in singing and dancing at the age of two. She made her first television appearance at the age of eight performing live on the weekly ABC series Soapbox Theatre where she performed for two years.

She also appeared in a number of films, including Love Is Better Than Ever (MGM, 1952) Beware, My Lovely (RKO, 1952), Vicki (20th Century Fox, 1953) and Dondi (Allied Artists, 1961).

At the age of 13, Scott began performing on the musical stage. She starred in several off-Vine Street musicals, the first being Going Up in 1954. This was followed by a performance in Best Foot Forward, Paint Your Fingers and Vintage 60 in 1960. Scott also originated the role of Rosemary Pilkington in the 1961 Broadway musical How to Succeed in Business Without Really Trying, also appearing on the Grammy Award-winning original cast album. Her replacement, Michele Lee, also appeared in the film version of the musical.

At the age of 15, she signed on to RCA Records, not as Bonnie Paul but as Bonnie Scott so to avoid confusion with singer Bunny Paul, who was on contract with Capitol Records. While with RCA, Scott made several records and had a singing engagement at the Tropicana Las Vegas. She also made appearances on several television shows including The Jerry Lewis Show, Playhouse 90, The Adventures of Ozzie and Harriet and You Bet Your Life. She also had a supporting role as Judy Bessemer on the first season of ABC's That Girl in 1966. She retired from acting in 2019.

== Filmography ==
=== Film ===
- Dondi (1961)
- It’s All Right (1971)
- It’s All Right 2 (1973)

=== Television ===
- That Girl
- He & She
- Bert D'Angelo/Superstar
- The Streets of San Francisco
