= Are You with It? (musical) =

- Music: Harry Revel
- Lyrics: Arnold B. Horwitt
- Book: Sam Perrin; George Balzer
- Premiere: November 10, 1945: New Century Theatre, New York City
- Productions: 1946 Broadway

Are You with It? is an American musical with music by Harry Revel and lyrics by Arnold B. Horwitt. The musical book by Sam Perrin and George Balzer is based on the novel Slightly Perfect by George Malcolm-Smith. The production opened on Broadway at the New Century Theatre where it ran from November 10, 1945, through April 27, 1946. The show then moved to the Shubert Theatre where it played from April 30 through June 29, 1946, closing after a total of 264 performances.

== Productions ==
The show was directed by Edward Reveaux, musically staged by Jack Donohue, set and lighting design by George Jenkins, costume design by Willa Kim based on costume sketches by Raoul Pene Du Bois, musical directed by William C. K. Irwin, vocal arrangements by H. Clay Warnick, with orchestrations by Joe Glover, Hans Spialek, Ted Royal, Don Walker, and Walter Paul.

== Opening night cast ==
- Johnny Downs as Wilbur Haskins
- Lew Parker as "Goldie"
- Jane Dulo as Marge Keller
- Dolores Gray as Bunny de Fleur
- Joan Roberts as Vivian Reilly
- Diane Adrian as Sally Swivelhips
- Sydney Boyd as Mr. Bixby
- Bunny Briggs as Cicero
- Jane Deering as Snake Charmer's Daughter
- Lou Hurst as 1st Musician
- David Lambert as 2nd Musician
- Jerry Duane as 3rd Musician
- Jerry Packer as 4th Musician
- Lew Eckels as Carter
- Hal Hunter as Office Boy
- Mildred Jocelyn as Balloon Seller
- William Lundy as Strong Man
- Duke McHale as Policeman
- Buster Shaver as Georgetta
- George Shaver as George
- Olive Shaver as Olive
- Richard Shaver as Richard
- Johnny Stearns as Mr. Mapleton / A Barker
- Loren Welch as Loren
- Lou Wills Jr. as Bartender
- June Richmond as Cleo
- Jimmy Allen, Dorothy Bennett, Vivian Cook, Dorothy Drew, Cece Eames, Suzanne Graves, Beth Green, Penny Holt, Gretchen Houser, Bill Julian, Jo Ann Kavanagh, John Laverty, Charlotte Lorraine, Pat Marlowe, John Martin, Don Miraglia, June Morrison, Tommy Morton, Kay Popp, Renee Russell, George Thornton, Eddie Vale, Bette Valentine, and Doris York as Ensemble

== Musical numbers ==
=== Act I ===
- "Five More Minutes in Bed" - Marge and Ensemble
- "Slightly Perfect" - Vivian and Wilbur
- "When a Good Man Takes to Drink" - Vivian and Policeman
- "When a Good Man Takes to Drink" (reprise) - Vivian, Policeman, and Bartender
- "Poor Little Me" - Cleo
- "Are You with It?" - Bunny, Quartet, and Ensemble
- "This Is My Beloved" - Vivian and Wilbur
- "Slightly Slightly" - Olive, George, and Richard
- "Vivian's Reverie" - Orchestra

=== Act II ===
- "Send Us Back to the Kitchen" - Marge and Girls
- "Here I Go Again" - Vivian and Quartet
- "You Gotta Keep Saying No" - Bunny
- "Just Beyond the Rainbows" - Cleo and Ensemble
- "In Our Cozy Little Cottage of Tomorrow" - Bunny and Goldie
- Finale - Entire company
