= Ted Bessell =

American actor and television director (1935–1996)

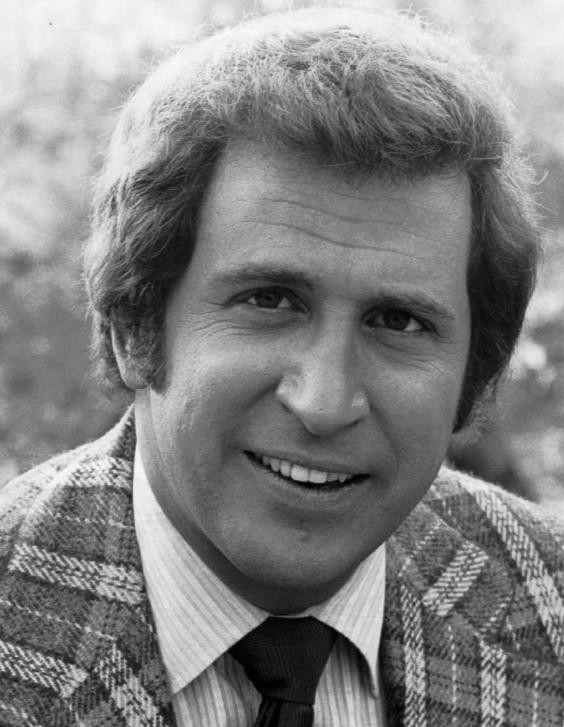
- Bessell in the early 1970s
- Born: Howard Weston Bessell, Jr. March 20, 1935; Flushing, Queens, New York, U.S.
- Died: October 6, 1996 (aged 61); Los Angeles California, U.S.
- Resting place: Woodlawn Memorial Cemetery, Santa Monica, California
- Education: Georgetown University; University of Colorado
- Occupations: Actor; director
- Years active: 1962–1996
- Spouse: Linnell Nobori (m. 1982)
- Children: 2

Howard Weston "Ted" Bessell Jr. (March 20, 1935 – October 6, 1996) was an American television actor and director widely known for his role as Donald Hollinger, the boyfriend and eventual fiancé of Marlo Thomas's character in the TV series That Girl (1966–1971).

== Early life and education ==
Born in Flushing, New York, to Howard Weston "Buster" Bessell (1904–1958) and his wife, Jo (1915–2004), Ted Bessell grew up in Manhasset, New York and attended Manhasset Secondary School. He was initially preparing for a career as a classical musician. As a 12-year-old child prodigy, he performed a piano recital at Carnegie Hall. Bessell played lacrosse in high school with future football star and actor Jim Brown.

After attending Georgetown University and the University of Colorado, Bessell decided to focus on acting. He studied with Sanford Meisner at the Neighborhood Playhouse, studied dance and dramatic movement with Martha Graham and Louis Horst, was a member of a professional acting class under Meisner and worked with Wynn Handman in another professional acting group. He worked at ABC New York as a page (or usher) to supplement his income in the late 1950s.

== Career ==
He appeared on such TV shows as Who Do You Trust? with Johnny Carson and The Dick Clark Show, a Saturday-night variety show featuring rock 'n roll stars. He directed and acted in stock where he appeared in a wide spectrum of theatre works ranging from Shakespeare to Jule Styne. He then was cast in the off-Broadway production of The Power of Darkness, which led to further off-Broadway work with the Blackfriars Guild. He co-produced (with his brother, writer-director Frank Bessell) Joe Orton's Crimes of Passion, directed by Michael Kahn.

Bessell first went to Los Angeles in the West Coast production of Thomas Wolfe's Look Homeward, Angel, for which he received great critical notices. Following that, he had small roles in The Outsider and Lover Come Back in 1961.

In 1962, he played 27-year-old college student Tom-Tom DeWitt on the short-lived television series It's a Man's World. In 1965, he appeared in an episode of 12 O'Clock High and The Alfred Hitchcock Hour episode, "Thou Still Unravished Bride", as Elliott. In 1965 to 1966, he was also regularly featured on Jim Nabors's Gomer Pyle, U.S.M.C. as Private Francis "Frankie" Lombardi.

Bessell appeared in such feature films as McHale's Navy Joins the Air Force (1965), and Don't Drink the Water (1969). He appeared in the TV films Two on a Bench (1971) and Your Money or Your Wife (1972), which won the Peabody Award for Best Mystery of the Year.

== That Girl (1966–1971) and other work ==
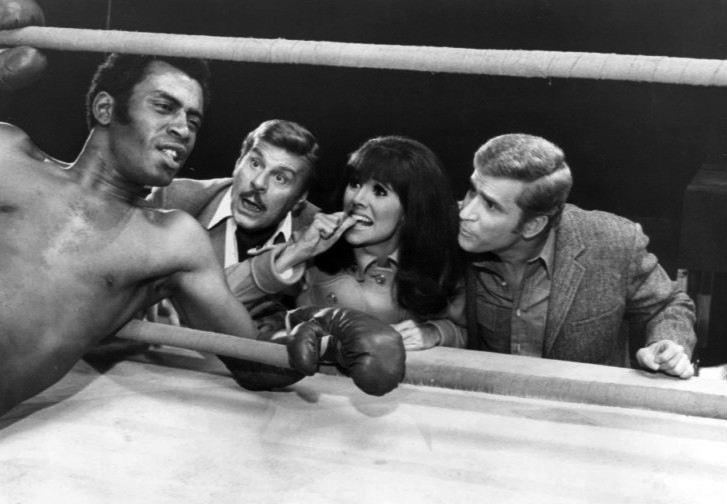
Bessell (right) with Scoey Mitchell, Billy De Wolfe, and Marlo Thomas in That Girl, 1969.

Bessell's best-known TV role was as Donald Hollinger, Marlo Thomas's boyfriend and fiancé on the hit series That Girl, which ran for five seasons from 1966 to 1971.

When That Girl ended its run, he tried his hand at another sitcom, Me and the Chimp, in which he played Mike Reynolds, a dentist who is persuaded by his children to take in a runaway chimpanzee. Created by Garry Marshall, the show had a short, unsuccessful run of 19 episodes in 1972. He had a supporting role in the television film Scream, Pretty Peggy (1973) and Bessell carried the lead role in the television film Bobby Parker and Company (1974) and another supporting role in Three Comedies (1975).

It was not until 1975 that Bessell would appear in another sitcom, as Joe Warner, the boyfriend of Mary Richards, for two episodes on The Mary Tyler Moore Show. In the 1980s, he appeared in several other TV movies, including Breaking Up Is Hard to Do (1979) and The Acorn People (1981). He also played regular roles on a pair of short-lived sitcoms, Good Time Harry (1980) and, in his last major role, Hail to the Chief, (1985) as the husband of Patty Duke's character, the fictional first female President of the United States.

Bessell moved into directing, helming episodes of The Tracey Ullman Show and Sibs. In 1989, he shared an Emmy as a producer on Fox Broadcasting's The Tracey Ullman Show, which was honored as best variety or comedy program.

== Death ==
Bessell died on October 6, 1996, due to a ruptured aortic aneurysm at age 61. He is interred in Woodlawn Memorial Cemetery, Santa Monica, California.

== Personal life ==
Bessell was married to Linnell Nobori and had two daughters, Sarah and Mary.
