= Centracom =

American telecommunications company

CentraCom
- Type: Incumbent local exchange carrier, competitive local exchange carrier
- Industry: Telecommunications
- Founded: 1903
- Founder: Ezekial Cheney, Elsberry Garlic and Oscar Norman
- Headquarters: Fairview, Utah, USA
- Key people: I. Branch Cox (Chairman, CEO); Ed Cox (President); Brad Welch (COO)
- Services: Telephony; Internet; Television
- Number of employees: 175 (2023)
- Website: http://www.centracom.com/

CentraCom Interactive is a telecommunications company, which provides fiber-optic communication, cable internet, wireless broadband, DSL service, phone service, and cable TV to much of central, north and western Utah. CentraCom is DBA of Central Utah Telephone, Inc.

Central Utah Telephone was founded in 1903 as the first Independent rural telephone company in Fairview, Utah.

== Subsidiaries ==
- Central Utah Telephone
- Skyline Telecom
- Bear Lake Communications
- Manti Telephone Company
- Manti Tele Communications Company
- AFConnect
- Central Telecom Services, LLC
- CUTV
- CentraCom Business Services
- CentraCom Long Distance

== Services ==
- Fiber-optic
- Cable Internet
- Wireless broadband
- DSL
- Cable Television
- HDTV
- ISDN
- Dedicated Internet Service
- Voice Services

== History ==
Ezekial Cheney, Elsberry Garlic and Oscar Norman started a local telephone system in Fairview, Utah and named it Fairview Telephone Company on July 4, 1903. In their first year, Fairview Telephone Company only sold and installed four telephones.

After several changes in ownership, Roy B. Cox purchased the telephone system on July 1, 1919. Iven Cox took over management of the business from Roy in 1940. He operated the company until his retirement in 1979. Retaining the titles of president and chairman of the board, Iven placed his son I Branch Cox in charge of running the business. Branch's cousin, Eddie L. Cox, was assigned the office manager.

On June 18, 2001, Lynch Interactive Corporation, a company based in Rye, New York, purchased Central Utah Telephone and its subsidiaries. Lynch Interactive (AMEX:LIC) left all existing management and staff in place.

In 2001, Qwest Communications, successor to U.S. West, divested itself of a number of rural exchanges in Utah. Central Utah Telephone acquired the Mt. Pleasant – Spring City exchange. Additionally, in that same sale Central Utah Telephone extended their westward reach to the Utah–Nevada border by purchasing the Dugway and Wendover, Utah exchanges. With the completion of these purchases, the geographical footprint of Central Utah Telephone, Inc. covered nearly one sixth of the land mass of the State of Utah and touches the states of Idaho and Nevada.

In 2005, CentraCom purchased the Precis Communications cable TV system in the Sevier and Sanpete Counties. This acquisition launched their cable TV service and business IP services. This purchased included an extensive fiber optic network. These fiber optic lines extend from Monroe, Utah to Salt Lake City and from Salt Lake City to Wendover, Utah. In 2009, CentraCom joined Western FiberNet.

On September 29, 2023, CentraCom purchased Manti Telephone Company and Manti Tele Communications Company. The purchase expands the CentraCom FTTH network in Ephraim, Utah and Manti, Utah. With this purchase, CentraCom also acquires AFConnect, an internet service provider in American Fork, Utah.
