= George Malcolm-Smith =

American novelist and jazz musicologist

George Malcolm-Smith (1901–1984) was an American novelist and jazz musicologist. A 1925 graduate of Trinity College, he hosted the first iteration of "Gems of American Jazz", a jazz radio program on WTIC-FM in Hartford, Connecticut, from 1942 to 1950. He also hosted two nationally syndicated programs for National Public Radio: "Gems of American Jazz" and "Other Gems of Jazz." They were produced at WPKT, Public Radio in Hartford.

He wrote eight humorous novels, most with "salty pictures by Carl Rose." His first novel was adapted into a Broadway musical in 1945 entitled Are You With It?. The musical was in turn adapted into a 1948 film.

He collected a large number of items related to jazz, which were given to the Watkinson Library at Trinity College after his death as dictated in his will.

== Novels ==
- Slightly Perfect (1941)
- The Grass is Always Greener (1947)
- The Square Peg (1952) [also released as Mugs, Molls and Dr. Harvey in Graphic paperback #104 (1955)]
- The Trouble With Fidelity (1957)
- If a Body Meet a Body (1959)
- The Lady Finger (1962)
- Come Out, Come Out (1965)
- Dividend of Death (1966).
