= Sherry Coben =

American screenwriter (1953–2024)

- Born: September 1953
- Died: October 16, 2024 (aged 71); New Milford, New Jersey, U.S.
- Occupation: Writer
- Notable work: Kate & Allie
- Children: 2

Sherry Coben (September 1953 – October 16, 2024) was an American writer who created the 1980s situation comedy Kate & Allie and the webseries Little Women, Big Cars.

== Early life ==
Coben was born in September 1953. She grew up in Cherry Hill, New Jersey, and attended Cherry Hill High School West, graduating in 1971. She attended both Swarthmore College and Cornell University.

== Career ==
Coben started her media career in the art department at KYW-TV. Her first TV writing work was on the 1979-1980 children's show Hot Hero Sandwich, for which she received an Emmy Award. She then wrote for Ryan's Hope before selling her first pilot script, which became the series Kate & Allie.

== Personal life and death ==
Coben married film editor Pat McMahon. Their long-distance relationship inspired Coben's second pilot, Love Long Distance, about a couple divided between Philadelphia and New York City; the pilot was shot but not picked up for a series.

Coben died from cancer at her home in New Milford, New Jersey, on October 16, 2024, at the age of 71.
