= Bill Persky =

American director, screenwriter and producer

- Born: September 9, 1931 (age 94)
- Occupations: Television director Screenwriter; Television producer Actor
- Spouse: Joanna Patton (3rd wife)
- Children: Dana Persky; Jamie Persky; Liza Persky; Alexandra Feldon

Bill Persky (born September 9, 1931) is an American television director, screenwriter, and producer.

== Biography ==
Persky was born to a Jewish family, the son of an estate auctioneer. His father would travel between various resort towns where the wealthy lived to conduct estate auctions. He has one older sister, Bunny Persky Grossinger, and attended Ramble Elementary School in Hot Springs, Arkansas. During the summers, he worked as a lifeguard in the Borscht Belt in the Catskill Mountains. He attended Syracuse University, where he studied advertising, and after school went to work for an advertising agency in New York City. He then took a job at WNEW where he met Sam Denoff where they wrote jokes for the DJs out of fun which soon morphed into part of their job tasks. The writing team moved to Los Angeles in the 1960s, taking a job to write for The Steve Allen Show.

Persky and Denoff wrote some of the most popular episodes of The Dick Van Dyke Show. They later wrote and created the television show That Girl starring Marlo Thomas as well as Good Morning World starring Joby Baker and Ronnie Schell. Persky directed 100 episodes of the situation comedy Kate and Allie. He also directed the situation comedies The Practice (1976) and Busting Loose (1977), and the movie Serial (1980).

In 2015, Persky appeared on the reality TV show NY:ER (season 2, episode 13) as himself after suffering a collapsed lung. In the appearance, Persky had his wife bring a copy of his book My Life as a Situation Comedy to the ER so he could sign a copy for his nurse. His wife also claimed to have brought him a bottle of bourbon, which was not shown.

== Personal life ==
Persky has been married three times. He has three daughters with his first wife: neuropsychologist Dana Persky, restaurateur Jamie Persky, and television producer Liza Persky. He had a fourth daughter, Alexandra Feldon, with his second wife Marsha Pinkstaff. His third wife is New York advertising executive Joanna Patton.
