= Colocation (business) =

Act of placing multiple entities within a single location

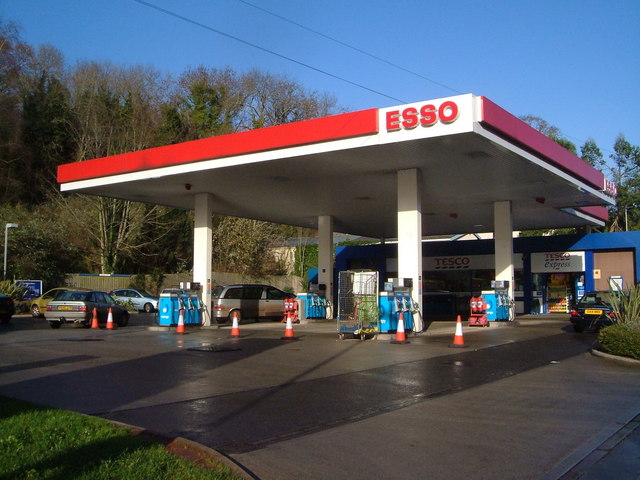
Colocation of an Esso petrol station and Tesco Express convenience store.

Colocation (or co-location) is the act of placing multiple (sometimes related) entities within a single location.

== Use by different industries ==
In an organization, colocation refers to placing related roles or groups in a single room, building or campus. In business, it refers to the practice of locating multiple similar businesses in the same facility. In trading, it often refers to placing multiple data centers in proximity to trading centers.

In telecommunications, primarily wireless telecommunications, facilities such as mobile wireless (cell sites) and radio broadcasting, colocation refers to the practice of locating multiple wireless broadcast facilities/providers within the same facility. Many jurisdictions now mandate the colocation of mobile wireless carriers within a single facility to avoid the proliferation of wireless communication towers.

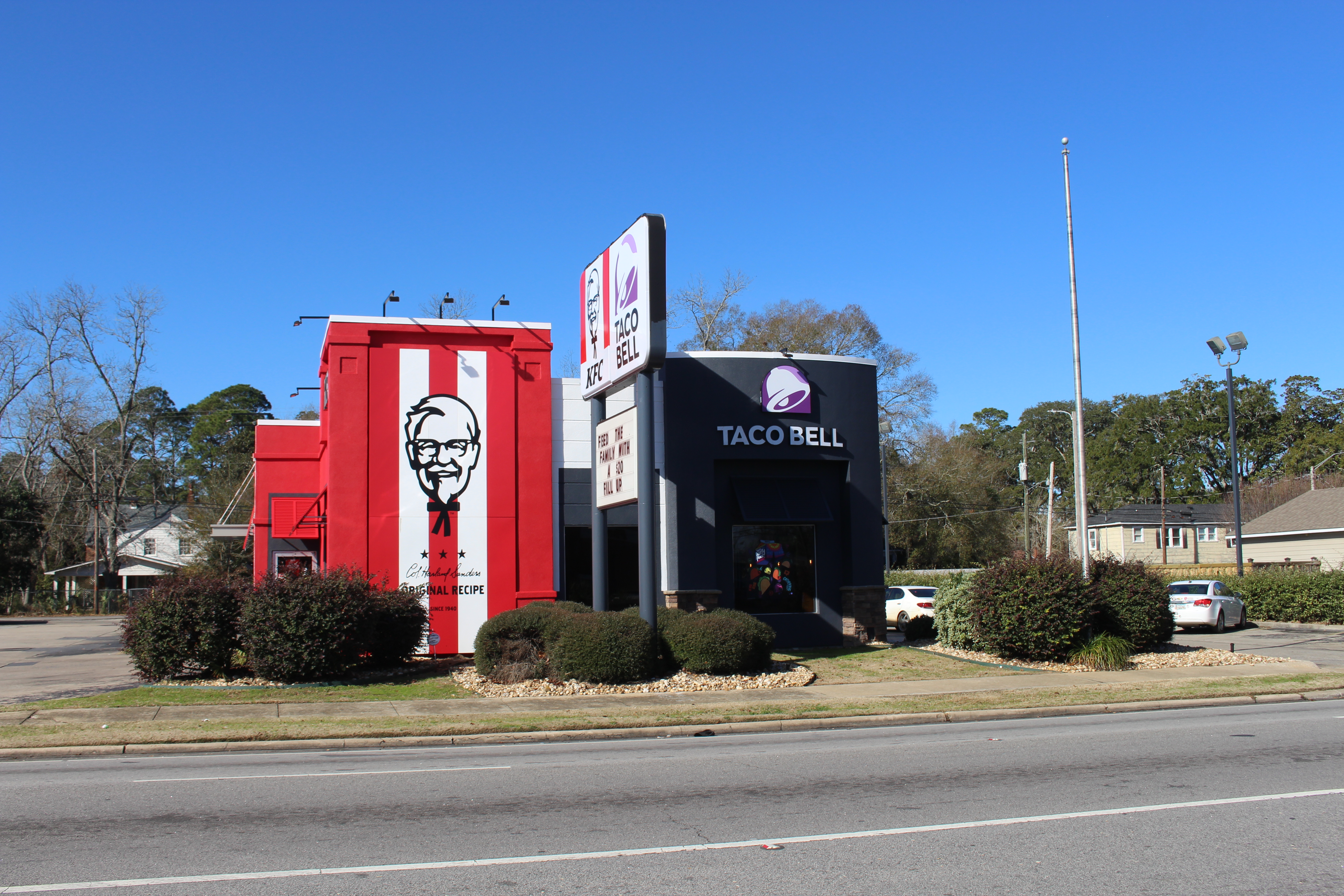
Colocation of a KFC restaurant and a Taco Bell restaurant

In the fast food restaurant industry, one company known for its use of the concept is Yum! Brands with its KFC, Taco Bell, and Pizza Hut menus appearing in the same restaurant. All of the WingStreet chain locations are co-located with Pizza Hut.

In the retail sector, Sears Holdings often operates its large-format Sears stores with an income tax services office, an optical shop, and other independent operations. Walmart is also known for this, in addition to including fast-food restaurants such as McDonald's, Subway or Dunkin' Donuts within its stores. Target often includes Starbucks and Pizza Hut in its stores.

In the airline industry, colocation commonly occurs at airports. Airline alliances will be assigned or build a fortress out of certain terminals or dominant carrier-specific terminals; Star Alliance in particular makes colocation in a single terminal alliance policy (termed "Move Under One Roof"). An example would be at Tokyo's Narita Airport, where local carrier All Nippon Airways, a Star Alliance member, and its partners operate in one terminal to facilitate partner connections and product offerings, even offering combined check-in, member lounges, and ground services.

Colocation is often used in the data sourcing industry to mean off-site data storage, usually in a data center. This is very important for businesses since the loss of data can be crucial for companies of any size, up to and including disciplinary action for employees or loss of their jobs. An unexpected loss in data can result from fires, earthquakes, floods, or any sort of natural disaster.

Data colocation technology began to take hold in the telecommunications industry. Colocation enables multiple customers to access network, server, and data storage space, connecting them to a variety of service providers.
