= List of The Jeffersons episodes =

The following is a list of episodes of the American television sitcom The Jeffersons. A total of 253 episodes were produced and aired on CBS from January 18, 1975, to July 2, 1985, spanning a total of 11 seasons.

== Series overview ==
Season	Episodes	Originally released		Rank	Rating
Season	Episodes	First released	Last released	Rank	Rating
1	13	January 18, 1975	April 12, 1975	4	27.6
2	24	September 13, 1975	March 6, 1976	21	21.5
3	24	September 25, 1976	April 11, 1977	24	21.0
4	26	September 24, 1977	March 4, 1978	52	17.6
5	24	September 20, 1978	April 18, 1979	49	17.4
6	24	September 23, 1979	April 13, 1980	8	24.3
7	20	November 2, 1980	March 29, 1981	6	23.5
8	25	October 4, 1981	May 16, 1982	3	23.4
9	27	September 26, 1982	May 1, 1983	12	20.0 (Note: Tied with Newhart.)
10	22	October 2, 1983	May 6, 1984	19	16.6
11	24	October 14, 1984	July 2, 1985	50	13.2

== Episodes ==
=== Season 1 (1975) ===
No. overall	No. in season	Title	Directed by	Written by	Original release date
1	1	"A Friend in Need"	Jack Shea	T : Don Nicholl, Michael Ross, Bernie West; S/T : Barry Harman & Harve Brosten	January 18, 1975
The Jeffersons have moved on up and are now enjoying living in their new high-rise apartment. Louise has made a new friend, and Diane Stockwell, who is having a hard time, believing that George made his way up the ladder without doing anything shady. However, bigger problems are brewing when George insists that Louise hire a maid but Louise is totally against the idea. Note: This episode was remade as part of 2019's Live in Front of a Studio Audience: Norman Lear's All in the Family and The Jeffersons. Recording Date: December 13, 1974
2	2	"George's Family Tree"	Jack Shea	Perry Grant & Dick Bensfield	January 25, 1975
The Willises give Louise and George a piece of primitive African art, as a housewarming gift, which leads to the discussion of family roots. This leads George to discover his family roots, from an African tribe believed to be kings.
3	3	"Louise Feels Useless"	Jack Shea	Lloyd Turner & Gordon Mitchell	February 1, 1975
Louise is having a hard time getting used to her new wealthy lifestyle and the boredom that comes along with it. She begins trying to talk George into letting her work in the store in the building but he is totally against it. This leads her to inadvertently get a job with another cleaning business and George hits the ceiling when he learns the news. That is until he begins thinking of using her position for sabotage.
4	4	"Lionel, the Playboy"	Jack Shea	Roger Schulman & John Baskin	February 8, 1975
Lionel's new wealthy lifestyle begins to have an effect on him and a carefree attitude begins to be seen by his family. He stays out all night every night and cuts class. This leads to him debating whether or not to drop out of college. (Note: Roxie Roker and Franklin Cover do not appear in this episode)
5	5	"Mr. Piano Man"	Jack Shea	Lloyd Turner & Gordon Mitchell	February 15, 1975
George refuses to participate in a tenants' meeting until he learns the Mr. Whittendale will be there. George has hopes of doing business with the man. Meanwhile, George's want for a grand piano becomes a burden during the meeting.
6	6	"George's Skeleton"	Jack Shea	T : Lloyd Turner, Gordon Mitchell; S/T : Erik Tarloff	February 22, 1975
An old friend of George's, Monk Davis, drops in after learning of George's newfound success. However, Monk has more on his mind than just a friendly visit - he wants some favors and plans to get them by using some dirty laundry from George's childhood. Guest Star: Moses Gunn
7	7	"Lionel Cries Uncle"	Jack Shea	S : Jim Carlson; T : Lloyd Turner & Gordon Mitchell	March 1, 1975
Louise is expecting a visit from her Uncle Ward, a man who happens to be a butler. His job is what makes George and Lionel put him down, calling him an "Uncle Tom." Meanwhile, a fight at school prompts Lionel to get kicked out after he ends up in the wrong place at the wrong time. He is offered a second chance in exchange for acknowledging he was involved, but refuses to do so despite his parents' insistence. Surprisingly, Uncle Ward sides with Lionel and encourages him to stand up for himself instead. This gives both Lionel and George newfound respect for Uncle Ward.
8	8	"Mother Jefferson's Boyfriend"	Jack Shea	Gordon Farr & Arnold Kane	March 8, 1975
George learns of Mother Jefferson's intentions of marriage and is totally against the idea, thinking her fiancee is after his money.
9	9	"Meet the Press"	Jack Shea	Dixie Brown Grossman	March 15, 1975
Wanting publicity for his stores, George tries to get in on a reporter's series of stories on successful black businessmen. However, once he finally gets the reporter to make an appearance he finds it difficult to hold his attention, with the Willises and Mr. Bentley hanging around.
10	10	"Rich Man's Disease"	Jack Shea	Bruce Howard	March 22, 1975
With the doctor's diagnosis that George has an ulcer, Louise tries to do everything to not allow George to become upset. The task proves difficult with Harry, Tom, and Helen dropping in.
11	11	"Former Neighbors"	Jack Shea	Art Baer & Ben Joelson	March 29, 1975
George comes home one evening with news an important potential client is coming over for dinner. However, Louise has news too. Some old friends of the Jeffersons are coming over, friends whom George is afraid will embarrass him in front of his pompous client.
12	12	"Like Father, Like Son"	Jack Shea	Frank Tarloff	April 5, 1975
Louise becomes concerned when she sees Lionel beginning to act more like his father. Things come to a head when Lionel tries to get Jenny a seat on a campaign committee by using bribery. Meanwhile, Tom and Helen are at odds when they each back opposing candidates.
13	13	"Jenny's Low"	Jack Shea	John Ashby	April 12, 1975
Jenny's globe-trotting brother surprises his family with a visit home. While Tom and Helen, debate on the reason for Allan staying away so long, Jenny is anything but happy about his visit and her reason has nothing to do with staying away for so long. Guest Star: Andrew Rubin

=== Season 2 (1975–76) ===
No. overall	No. in season	Title	Directed by	Written by	Original release date
14	1	"A Dinner for Harry"	Jack Shea	Don Nicholl, Michael Ross & Bernie West	September 13, 1975
It's Harry Bentley's birthday and the Jeffersons are planning a birthday party at their apartment. However, the joyous occasion is anything but when Tom arrives wearing the same dinner jacket as George. While Bentley enjoys himself immensely, everyone else ends up fighting. Meanwhile, Helen keeps the fact that she was mugged from Tom due to the fact that Tom is at the end of his rope with New York. While dropping off the birthday cake, Ralph lets slip about the mugging and Tom tells Helen they're moving. However, he later changes his mind and everyone enjoys the party.
15	2	"George's First Vacation"	Jack Shea	Frank Tarloff	September 20, 1975
George doesn't know what to do with himself on a Sunday, the only day of the week George doesn't work. Tom quickly points out the obvious that George is a workaholic. Just to spite him, George decides to show him that he can relax and decides to book him and Louise on a cruise. However, Louise and George find themselves with a problem; Mother Jefferson has invited herself along.
16	3	"Louise's Daughter"	Jack Shea	Jay Moriarty & Mike Milligan	September 27, 1975
When a young woman shows up at the Jefferson's door with the news that she thinks that she's Louise's daughter, George has a fit and begins to doubt Louise. Especially since the young woman was born while George was in the Korean War. Note: Damon Evans joins the cast as the new Lionel Jefferson.
17	4	"Harry and Daphne"	Jack Shea	Lloyd Turner & Gordon Mitchell	October 4, 1975
Harry is sure that his latest girlfriend, Daphne is going to pop the question and doesn't have the heart to let her down. So he bolts to Jefferson's bathroom. Meanwhile, George tries to handle an inspector who's inspecting one of George's stores. However, George's method to avoid paying a fine by blackmailing the inspector doesn't go over too well. Guest star: René Auberjonois
18	5	"Mother Jefferson's Fall"	Jack Shea	Erik Tarloff	October 11, 1975
After being ignored due to George and Louise caught up in a fierce gin rummy battle and Lionel out on a date, a hurt Mother Jefferson fakes a fall and gets all the attention she wants, and proves to be an even bigger burden to Louise than usual. George is upset when he discovers the truth, but Louise makes him realize what provoked the deception and he apologizes to his mother.
19	6	"Jefferson vs. Jefferson"	Jack Shea	Arthur Marx & Bob Fisher	October 18, 1975
Things aren't going too well for George and Louise on their anniversary. First, Louise must contend with the unwelcome Mother Jefferson, and then she must contend with George's odd anniversary gift, bicycles. She quickly learns his motive for buying them, to meet Mr. Whittendale.
20	7	"Uncle Bertram"	Jack Shea	Don Nicholl, Michael Ross, Bernie West, Lloyd Turner & Gordon Mitchell	October 25, 1975
Mother Jefferson encounters a masher in the elevator and later discovers he's Tom's uncle, Bertram Willis. Things get out of hand when she locks him out on the balcony. However, they quickly bond over spiked tea and ultimately start dating. Meanwhile, George wants to buy antique furniture, much to Louise's dismay. They end up purchasing an armoire that gets stuck in the elevator.
21	8	"Movin' on Down"	Jack Shea	Ken Levine & David Isaacs	November 1, 1975
George is sure that he's movin' back down the ladder after some financial setbacks. His worries soon turn into nightmares and with both Lionel asking for money and Florence asking for a raise, George's worries don't appear to be ending anytime soon.
22	9	"George Won't Talk"	Jack Shea	John Ashby	November 8, 1975
George is excited about being invited to speak in front of some youths about his success, that is until he discovers the place he is to speak at is in Harlem. Later, George's fears are justified when the delivery van is looted. Guest stars: Robert Guillaume and Ernest Thomas
23	10	"Jenny's Grandparents"	Jack Shea	James Ritz	November 15, 1975
Jenny is tired of the bickering between her two grandfathers, Mr. Douglass and Henry Willis, who have been against each other ever since Tom and Helen wed. So this leads Jenny, Lionel, Louise, Mother Jefferson, and Uncle Bertram to concoct a scheme to get the two together at the Jeffersons' apartment since neither of the grandfathers will set foot in the Willises' apartment. They also get rid of George by telling him Mother Jefferson's new minister will be coming to the apartment so George will leave. Thanks to a moving plea from Jenny, her grandfathers make peace, but when George feels guilty and comes back to meet the minister, he ends up reigniting the feud.
24	11	"George's Best Friend"	Jack Shea	T : Lloyd Turner & Gordon Mitchell; S/T : Calvin Kelly	November 22, 1975
George's old navy buddy, Wendell comes for a visit and immediately begins makes passes at Louise. Louise quickly finds herself in a difficult situation, especially since she likes the unexpected attention, since George has recently not been spending any time with her. Guest star: Louis Gossett Jr.
25	12	"George and the Manager"	Jack Shea	T : Jay Moriarty & Mike Milligan; S/T : Don Boyle	November 29, 1975
George needs a new manager for his store on the first floor in the apartment building. However, the person who's the most qualified for the job he refuses to hire for two reasons, she's a woman and she's white.
26	13	"George's Alibi"	Jack Shea	Sandy Krinski	December 6, 1975
Lionel is in a car accident with the van which results in a broken headlight and dented fender. When Lionel doesn't tell George about it, George becomes convinced he was in an accident which could get him in trouble with the mob.
27	14	"Lunch with Mama"	Jack Shea	Don Nicholl, Michael Ross, Bernie West, Lloyd Turner & Gordon Mitchell	December 13, 1975
Louise realizes that Mother Jefferson has a stronghold on George when he refuses to cancel a monthly lunch with his mother and go with Louise to a funeral for a family friend.
28	15	"George vs. Wall Street"	Jack Shea	George Burditt	December 20, 1975
A late phone call makes George wide-awake when he learns that a flood in Illinois will cause his investment in the stock market to go through the roof. However, George himself is the one through the roof when he learns that Lionel turned down an engineering job which quickly leads to a Jefferson/Willis fight at the Willises' apartment.
29	16	"The Break-Up: Part 1"	Jack Shea	Dixie Brown Grossman	January 3, 1976
Lionel is desperate to pass a course but his odds are slim his passing hinges on a paper he has to write about homosexuality. This leads George to buy a term paper for him, but this leads to a tremendous blow up ending with Jenny and Lionel breaking up and Louise and Helen ending their friendship.
30	17	"The Break-Up: Part 2"	Jack Shea	Lloyd Turner & Gordon Mitchell	January 10, 1976
Tom and Helen debate on whether or not to take the first step and try to patch things up with George and Louise while Louise debates the same thing. Meanwhile, Lionel makes a final decision about whether or not to use the ready made term paper, and George's attempt to help Lionel move on from Jenny puts him in hot water.
31	18	"Florence's Problem"	Jack Shea	Jay Moriarty & Mike Milligan	January 24, 1976
Florence goes on a cleaning spree in the Jefferson's apartment as well as behaving extremely strange including, kissing Harry and giving away a swimming award to Louise. This leads Louise to believe Florence is contemplating suicide.
32	19	"Mother Jefferson's Birthday"	Jack Shea	Fred Fox & Seaman Jacobs	January 31, 1976
Mother Jefferson is all excited about it being her 70th birthday and even more excited about what George is giving her for a gift. However, George and Louise have totally forgotten all about it leading them to scramble to come up with something to please the old biddy.
33	20	"Louise's Cookbook"	Jack Shea	S : Ann Gibbs & Joel Kimmel; T : Jay Moriarty, Mike Milligan, Lloyd Turner & Gordon Mitchell	February 7, 1976
Louise is offered the opportunity to write a cookbook for Tom's publishing company. Pelham Publishing. However, just as she gets started, a green-eyed George tries his best to put an end to her cookbook.
34	21	"George Meets Whittendale"	Jack Shea	Lloyd Turner & Gordon Mitchell	February 14, 1976
George is excited that he's going to finally meet Mr. Whittendale, however a previous engagement with Harry could foil George's plans. Things get even worse for George when he becomes trapped in the bathroom with Tom and Helen.
35	22	"Lionel's Problem"	Jack Shea	S : Mia Abbott; T : James Ritz	February 21, 1976
Prior to his graduation from college, Lionel takes to drinking to ease the pressure of his expected success. Things come to a head when, on the day of his graduation, comes home drunk.
36	23	"Tennis, Anyone?"	Jack Shea	Sandy Veith	February 28, 1976
George is all excited to be the newest member of an exclusive tennis club. However, the real reasons for his induction slowly come to the surface after he meets the club's towel "boy."
37	24	"The Wedding"	Jack Shea	John Donley, Lloyd Turner & Gordon Mitchell	March 6, 1976
After reading an article about Harry Belafonte renewing his marriage vows, George decides to do the same thing. However, Louise has second thoughts when she gets into an argument with George over her being an equal partner in Jefferson Cleaners.

=== Season 3 (1976–77) ===
No. overall	No. in season	Title	Directed by	Written by	Original release date
38	1	"George and the President"	Jack Shea	Howard Albrecht & Sol Weinstein	September 25, 1976
George's rival in the dry cleaning business, Cunnigham, is running a campaign due to the Bicentennial celebration. This prompts George to come up with his own campaign and decides to dress up as Thomas Jefferson to lure in new customers.
39	2	"Louise Gets Her Way"	Jack Shea	Lloyd Turner & Gordon Mitchell	October 2, 1976
Florence breaks down and tells Louise that she's losing her apartment due to the fact that the building is going to be torn down, this leads Louise to offer Florence a live-in maid position at the Jeffersons. Now the only problem is to get George to allow her to accept the job.
40	3	"Louise Suspects"	Jack Shea	Lloyd Turner & Gordon Mitchell	October 9, 1976
George is sneaking around trying to hide the fact that he's opening another store. He goes so far as to convince Louise he's having an affair after she discovers a love letter she thinks is to him from a woman named Adele. However, Adele is really Bentley's girlfriend, and Adele wrote the letter to Bentley.
41	4	"The Lie Detector"	Jack Shea	Tedd Anasti & David Talisman	October 16, 1976
Lionel is ecstatic about his first day at his new job. However, when he is forced to take a lie detector test to verify everything in his portfolio, he promptly quits. Meanwhile, Louise and George plan for a family portrait to be taken.
42	5	"George's Diploma"	Jack Shea	Lloyd Turner & Gordon Mitchell	October 23, 1976
George sets out to get a diploma after Lionel lies about George's education to his college pals saying he graduated from Harvard.
43	6	"The Retirement Party"	Jack Shea	Dixie Brown Grossman	October 30, 1976
George is ready to sell out to a big corporation after a company makes him a lucrative offer. This would make him a vice president however, after reading over a booklet on the rules and regulations, George discovers that this would also mean some of his best workers will be forced into retirement.
44	7	"Lionel's Pad"	Jack Shea	Booker Bradshaw & Kurt Taylor	November 10, 1976
When Lionel decides to move into his own apartment, Louise and George are not too happy. However, when they find out who Lionel's roommate will be, they really lose their cool. (Note: Starting with this episode, the show moved from Saturdays to Wednesdays until the 15th episode of this season.)
45	8	"Tom the Hero"	Jack Shea	Jay Moriarty & Mike Milligan	November 17, 1976
George becomes indebted to Tom after he gives George the Heimlich Maneuver at Charile's bar, when George begins to choke on some popcorn. However, George quickly finds away to end the debt after everyone makes a fuss over Tom's good deed.
46	9	"Jenny's Discovery"	Jack Shea	Bob Baublitz	November 24, 1976
Jenny comes down with a case of premarital jitters and begins to doubt her feelings for Lionel. However, her feelings are tested when George, Tom and Lionel all appear to have been in a bus crash on their way to a football game.
47	10	"The Agreement"	Jack Shea	Lloyd Turner & Gordon Mitchell	December 8, 1976
George interferes in Lionel and Jenny's relationship by suggesting to Lionel that he have Jenny sign a prenuptial agreement. This leads Jenny and Lionel to get into an argument which ends in them calling off the wedding.
48	11	"Florence in Love"	Jack Shea	S : Paul M. Belous & Robert Wolterstorff; T : Richard Freiman & Stephen Young	December 15, 1976
One early morning, Louise and George are startled to discover a man in the kitchen, it isn't until after George threatens to beat him with a trophy, he learns that Florence let him spend the night. When George tells Florence that working for him means doing what he says with no questions asked, she quits in retaliation. Florence later regrets leaving and George says he’ll hire her back on the condition she start being the type of maid he wants. Florence agrees and starts waiting on George hand and foot like a slave. While George enjoys this pampering at first, he soon regrets his ultimatum as Florence constantly being at his beck and call proves annoying. George finally breaks down, admitting he was wrong, and Florence goes back to being her old self.
49	12	"The Christmas Wedding"	Jack Shea	Jay Moriarty & Mike Milligan	December 22, 1976
Christmas Eve brings disharmony to the Jefferson household when George argues with Tom over the preparations for Lionel and Jenny's wedding which is to take place that evening.
50	13	"Louise Forgets"	Jack Shea	Bill Davenport	January 5, 1977
Louise is reading a book to try to help her to remember things, but the one thing George doesn't want her to forget, she does. She forgets to call his broker to invest some money, after he gets a stock tip about a new company supposedly owned by Mr. Whittendale. While George is at first angry when he finds out, the company is soon exposed as a scam and he forgives Louise. Meanwhile, Florence takes a Judo class for self-defense, only to wind up attacking Whittendale in the elevator after mistaking him for a mugger.
51	14	"Bentley's Problem"	Jack Shea	Lloyd Turner & Gordon Mitchell	January 12, 1977
Harry is having a problem with the person who parks his car next to him in the garage. Seeking advice, Harry goes to George. However, George's advice lands Harry in jail, after he punches a police officer. Thankfully, the cop later makes peace with Harry and even helps with his parking problem. Meanwhile, Louise is looking forward to a trip to California.
52	15	"Jefferson Airplane"	Jack Shea	S : Brian Levant; T : Dixie Brown Grossman	January 17, 1977
Louise is fed up with George's workaholic attitude and urges him to get a hobby. However, the hobby he chooses has her worried sick, he's decided to take up flying. (Note: The show moved from Wednesdays to Mondays and will remain there for the rest of the season.)
53	16	"George's Guilt"	Jack Shea	Jay Moriarty & Mike Milligan	January 24, 1977
George feels guilty for not staying in touch with the members of a childhood gang, after the death of one of the members. This leads George to hold a reunion at the apartment which also leads to a confrontation with the leader, JoJo, who keeps using his position to boss George around. When Louise tries to step in and JoJo insults her, George finally stands up to JoJo and throws him out. George then realizes that keeping out of touch with his old gang is the best way for them to stay friends.
54	17	"A Case of Black and White"	Jack Shea	Fred S. Fox, Seaman Jacobs, Lloyd Turner & Gordon Mitchell	January 31, 1977
George's latest business deal is with a black man married to a white woman, so when he invites them over for dinner, he also has Tom and Helen come over, to make it look like he doesn't have racial prejudices. However, when Tom and Helen discover the plot, they storm out before the guests have arrived. This leads to George having Florence and Ralph impersonate Tom and Helen.
55	18	"Louise vs. Jenny"	Jack Shea	John Ashby	February 7, 1977
Lionel falls ill while visiting his parents and Louise goes all out to take care of him. When Jenny comes over, she wants to take care of her sick husband which leads to a battle between who gets to take care of him, Lionel's mother or Lionel's wife.
56	19	"The Marriage Counselors"	Jack Shea	John V. Hanrahan	February 21, 1977
After learning that Tom and Helen are taking a course on how to improve their marriage, and seeing their results, Louise tries to get George to take the course with her. However, George refuses to consider the possibility that their marriage could use improvement.: Recording date: January 25, 1977
57	20	"Louise's Friend"	Jack Shea	T : Jay Moriarty & Mike Milligan; S/T : Richard Freiman & Stephen Young	February 28, 1977
Louise is taking French lessons and makes a friend with one of her classmates. However, when George discovers that her friend is a man, he is furious and can't believe that a woman can be just good friends with a man. This leads to yet another argument which leaves George sleeping on the couch. Guest star: Hal Williams
58	21	"The Old Flame"	Jack Shea	Jay Moriarty & Mike Milligan	March 7, 1977
Mother Jefferson invites a secret guest over for dinner and Louise and George are curious. When George learns that the guest is his old girlfriend, Harriet Johnson, he goes all out getting ready. However, George quickly learns Harriet has her own secret agenda; she wants to rekindle their relationship, and has no intention of letting his marriage stop her.
59	22	"Jenny's Opportunity"	Jack Shea	S : Paul M. Belous & Robert Wolterstorff; T : Lloyd Turner & Gordon Mitchell	March 21, 1977
Jenny has just won a scholarship to study for the summer at Oxford in England. Lionel thinks it would be a great experience for Jenny, that is until he learns his company won't transfer him there.
60	23	"George the Philanthropist"	Jack Shea	Dennis Koenig & Larry Balmagia	March 28, 1977
George is running for a prestigious award and is out to beat a fierce competitor by pledging more to a charity than his competitors. He pledges his money to open up a youth center in Harlem, however, when he learns he lost, he plans to withdraw his pledge.
61	24	"Louise's Physical"	Jack Shea	Lloyd Turner, Gordon Mitchell, Jay Moriarty & Mike Milligan	April 11, 1977
George, Tom, Helen, Harry, and Florence are all sneaking around to set up a surprise birthday party for Louise. However, Louise is not exactly in a party mood after she comes back from a checkup at the doctor's office, as it leaves her feeling depressed about her age.

=== Season 4 (1977–78) ===
No. overall	No. in season	Title	Directed by	Written by	Original release date
62	1	"The Grand Opening"	Jack Shea	Jay Moriarty, Mike Milligan, Roger Shulman & John Baskin	September 24, 1977
63	2	"The Grand Opening"	Jack Shea	Jay Moriarty, Mike Milligan, Roger Shulman & John Baskin	September 24, 1977
While George is in Charlie's bar getting ready to celebrate the opening of his new office, two men overhear him bragging about his wealth and decide to ransack his apartment. The celebration quickly cools, however, with the news that Louise has been kidnapped for ransom. But while George is hurrying to gather the ransom money for her safe return, both he and the kidnappers learn they have the wrong person when Louise returns to the apartment. The actual hostage is Florence, who manages to secretly relay information to George that enables the police to rescue her. (Notes: Marla Gibbs has officially become a regular cast member, and the series is now airing again on Saturdays.)
64	3	"Once a Friend"	Jack Shea	Michael S. Baser & Kim Weiskopf	October 1, 1977
George is excited when he learns that an old Navy pal is in town and wants him to stop by at his hotel for a visit. However, the old pal, whom George knew as Eddie Stokes has a big surprise for George: her name is now "Edie" after becoming a trans woman (Veronica Redd), which creates a mess of misunderstandings between George and Louise who thinks he's cheating on her. However, when Edie quotes one of the love letters Louise sent to George while he was in the Navy, Louise realizes George was telling the truth.
65	4	"George's Help"	Jack Shea	Patt Shea & Jack Shea	October 8, 1977
Helping out at the Help Center, puts Louise in the middle of a new program which gives street kids jobs with businesses. This leads to a street kid named Marcus getting a job at one of George's stores and soon George discovers an expensive suede jacket is missing, causing a fight between him and Louise when she defends Marcus.
66	5	"George's Legacy"	Jack Shea	Don Segall	October 15, 1977
George insists on being immortalized and devises ways of how to go about doing it. He finally decides to have a bust made of himself. However, his family and friends consider the bust a hilarious joke.
67	6	"Good News, Bad News"	Jack Shea	Jay Moriarty & Mike Milligan	October 22, 1977
Louise eyes a job opening at the Help Center, which would make her editor of the Help Center newsletter. However, when her supervisor discovers how much experience Helen has, she is hired, leaving a jealous Louise on the sideline.
68	7	"The Visitors"	Jack Shea	Roger Shulman & John Baskin	October 29, 1977
George and Louise have two unexpected house guests when Florence's separated parents, Don and Dora, come for a visit. Their constant bickering keeps George, Louise and Florence up all night, and proves to be a burden on the Jefferson household. The Jeffersons ultimately end up fighting themselves over the situation, which surprisingly results in the Johnstons reconciling and agreeing to give their marriage another chance.
69	8	"The Camp-Out"	Jack Shea	Jay Moriarty & Mike Milligan	November 5, 1977
To avoid a weekend visit from his mother, George leaves Louise to deal with her when he decides to take an unexpected camping trip with Marcus.
70	9	"The Last Leaf"	Jack Shea	Laura Levine	November 12, 1977
When Louise loses her lucky wedding corsage, she becomes convinced that her marriage is over. This leads George to bend over backwards to prove that their marriage is far from over. (Note: Zara Cully makes her last appearance as Olivia Jefferson.)
71	10	"Louise's New Interest"	Jack Shea	Olga Vallance	November 19, 1977
Louise's latest interest is working at a museum, where she is invited to go on an archeological dig. However, the only people going on the trip are her and her attractive supervisor, a fact that she keeps from George.
72	11	"The Costume Party"	Jack Shea	Martin Donovan	November 26, 1977
Louise and George are invited to a costume ball hosted by an organization that promotes inter-racial peace and inter-racial marriages. When George learns this, he is set against attending, but gets an idea that would drum up work for his dry cleaning business.
73	12	"Florence Gets Lucky"	Jack Shea	Bob DeVinney	December 3, 1977
George is once again pursuing a big business deal. However, when negotiations don't appear to be going his way, he gets Florence to constantly insult him to shift the odds, because the only thing the man with whom he's doing business enjoys is Florence's sharp tongue.
74	13	"George Needs Help"	Jack Shea	Roger Shulman & John Baskin	December 10, 1977
Louise is fed up with George's constant working, which leaves little time to spend with her, leading her to try to get George to hire a general manager, something he's set against.
75	14	"The Jefferson Curve"	Jack Shea	Paul M. Belous & Robert Wolterstorff	December 17, 1977
Marcus takes a lesson from George and throws a pretty girl the "Jefferson curve," which is to bend the truth to get what you want, telling the girl that he's Lionel. This eventually leads George and Louise to believe that Lionel is having an affair. They struggle to decide whether or not to break the news to Jenny, but when the girl arrives, everything is sorted out and she continues dating Marcus anyway.
76	15	"984 W. 124th Street, Apt. 5C"	Jack Shea	Roger Shulman & John Baskin	December 24, 1977
It's the Christmas season and the first wedding anniversary of Lionel and Jenny. However, George is sneaking around sending gifts to a mysterious address in Harlem, leading Louise to follow him, and she is shocked at what she discovers; the address is George’s childhood home.
77	16	"George and Whitty"	Jack Shea	Howard Albrecht & Sol Weinstein	January 7, 1978
George and Louise discover that their landlord, Mr. Whittendale, may not be renewing their lease, prompting George and Louise to invite Whittendale over to discuss the matter. However, just before he comes over, Harry drops his ant farm in the middle of the Jeffersons' living room.
78	17	"Lionel Gets the Business"	Bob Lally	Nancy Vince & Ted Dale	January 14, 1978
George is ecstatic when Lionel joins the family business. However, "ecstatic" is not the word to describe George when Lionel begins making major changes, and even puts into effect a half-price sale, a change that could put George out of business. (Note: Damon Evans makes his final appearance as Lionel Jefferson.)
79	18	"The Blackout"	Jack Shea	Richard B. Eckhaus	January 21, 1978
A blackout prompts George to rush down to one of his stores when he hears about looting in the area. Once there, George and Marcus try to save some of the clothes from the looters, but they are arrested by mistake, landing them in jail.
80	19	"Florence's Union"	Jack Shea	S : Patt Shea & Jack Shea; T : Andy Guerdat & Steve Kreinberg	January 28, 1978
Florence is named the head of the maids union in the building and wants to hold a meeting in the Jeffersons' apartment. George is all for it until he discovers, H.L. Whittendale is set against it, prompting Louise and Florence to get George out of the apartment for the evening so the meeting can be held. (Note: Jack Fletcher makes his first appearance as Mr. Whittendale. Roxie Roker, Franklin Cover, Berlinda Tolbert, and Paul Benedict do not appear in this episode.)
81	20	"George and Jimmy"	Jack Shea	Richard Freiman	February 4, 1978
After learning that Jimmy Carter stays at the homes of "ordinary people" while on trips, George intends to invite him to stay at the Jeffersons' abode. However, Secret Service agents show up at the Jeffersons' door after George makes a phone call to the White House which is misinterpreted as a threat to the president.
82	21	"Thomas H. Willis and Co."	Jack Shea	Jay Moriarty & Mike Milligan	February 11, 1978
Helen is excited for Tom when he plans on starting his own publishing firm. However, her happiness turns to anger when she gets into a fight with George, then later finds out Tom is going to get George to co-sign a loan.
83	22	"Uncle George and Aunt Louise"	Jack Shea	Roger Shulman & John Baskin	February 18, 1978
George and Louise have a house guest: George's nephew Raymond (Gary Coleman) is staying with them for six weeks and proves to be a handful. When George's attempts to entertain Raymond fail, George takes him horseback riding but when that fails, Raymond runs away. Note: This is the only time that George’s brother Henry is mentioned in the entire series.
84	23	"George and Louise in a Bind"	Jack Shea	Jim Rogers	February 25, 1978
85	24	"George and Louise in a Bind"	Jack Shea	Jim Rogers	February 25, 1978
86	25	"George and Louise in a Bind"	Jack Shea	Jim Rogers	February 25, 1978
Louise and George have another one of their infamous fights, which results in Louise storming off to the Willises'. Soon after she leaves, a burglar holds George hostage and ties him up. Louise is also tied up when she returns, which leads to George and Louise reminiscing about their lives and the time they've spent together. Numerous clips are shown from both The Jeffersons and All in the Family. (Note: Three days after this 90-minute episode aired, actress Zara Cully, who portrayed Mother Jefferson, died at age 86.)
87	26	"Jenny's Thesis"	Jack Shea	Paul M. Belous & Robert Wolterstorff	March 4, 1978
Jenny needs a topic for a thesis that she's writing. However, her idea could lead her into danger when she chooses the topic of street gangs. This leads her to go to Harlem and meet Marcus. Unknown to her, Tom and George are following her.

=== Season 5 (1978–79) ===
No. overall	No. in season	Title	Directed by	Written by	Original release date
88	1	"Louise's Painting"	Jack Shea	Nancy Vince & Ted Dale	September 20, 1978
Prompted by Helen, Louise begins taking an art class. However, when George discovers she's been sketching models who pose in the nude, he tries to get her to stop attending class. Louise convinces George to attend the class with her, but drags him out when the model who poses this time is female.
89	2	"The Homecoming: Part 1"	Jack Shea	Jay Moriarty & Mike Milligan	September 27, 1978
George decides that he needs a cleaning factory and sets out to find a place for it. Meanwhile, Allan Willis returns to New York and learns that he has inherited a warehouse from his grandfather. Seeing that Allan's warehouse would be perfect for his factory, George goes all out to try to get it, even allowing Alan to move in with the Jeffersons due to squabbling between Alan and Tom. (Note: Jay Hammer makes his first appearance as Alan Willis. Also, this episode is the first to acknowledge the death of Zara Cully ["Mother Jefferson"].)
90	3	"The Homecoming: Part 2"	Jack Shea	T : Paul M. Belous, Robert Wolterstorff; S/T : Jay Moriarty & Mike Milligan	October 4, 1978
Alan moves in with the Jeffersons and George continues his efforts to get the warehouse for himself. Meanwhile, battles with the landlord prompt Louise and Helen to try to find a better location for the Help Center.
91	4	"How Slowly They Forget"	Jack Shea	S : Erwin Washington; T : Nancy Vince & Ted Dale	October 11, 1978
Louise has been trying to get a permit for the Help Center, but she hasn't been able to make any progress with the bank. Georges goes to the bank and discovers that the banker is an old U.S. Navy pal of his, one who still holds a grudge over some trickery George pulled on him back in their Navy days.
92	5	"George's Dream"	Jack Shea	Bob Baublitz	October 18, 1978
Workaholic George falls asleep in his office, one evening, and has a dream that takes him to the year 1996. In the dream, Amy Carter is president of the United States; Louise is celebrating the 25th anniversary of George's business, who isn't there celebrating since he passed on a few years earlier; Florence, Helen and Tom Willis are considerably older; Ralph owns the apartment building; Leroy is a financial genius who owns Jefferson Cleaners; and Bentley is still the same.
93	6	"George's New Stockbroker"	Jack Shea	T : Bryan Joseph, Jay Moriarty & Mike Milligan; S/T : Jim Rogers	November 1, 1978
George's new stockbroker is quite a ventriloquist, after he introduces the Jeffersons to his dummy, J.P. However, George has second thoughts about him after he learns that he has spent time in a mental institution.
94	7	"Me and Billy Dee"	Jack Shea	S : Jay Moriarty & Mike Milligan; T : Bryan Joseph	November 4, 1978
At the last minute, George's speaker at a benefit cancels, which leaves him scrambling to find a celebrity to speak. He sets out to rope Billy Dee Williams into speaking, even considering getting a celebrity look-alike. However, George passes himself off as Alex Haley, and Billy Dee agrees to speak. Meanwhile, an excited Florence is let down when she mistakes Billy Dee, her idol, for an impersonator.
95	8	"Half a Brother"	Jack Shea	Bob Baublitz	November 8, 1978
George is being considered for a position on a bank's board of directors and, when a banker comes over to interview him, Alan and the banker's daughter hit it off. This leads George to worry that, because Alan is half black, this will jeopardize his chances of getting the position.
96	9	"What Are Friends For?"	Jack Shea	S : Skip Usen; T : Jay Moriarty & Mike Milligan	November 22, 1978
George is thrilled to get a visit from his favorite cousin, Dusty. George's thrill turns to shock when Dusty asks George for a kidney, since his are failing, leading George to take a long hard look at the pros and cons of parting with one of his organs.
97	10	"George, Who?"	Jack Shea	Christine Houston	November 29, 1978
Louise is convinced that she and George are in a routine, something at which George scoffs. However, their routine gets shaken up after Louise is brutally mugged, resulting in her amnesia.
98	11	"Harry's House Guest"	Jack Shea	Fred S. Fox & Seaman Jacobs	December 13, 1978
Harry practically moves into the Jeffersons' apartment to avoid his annoying house guest, Felicia. George tries to help him out by giving him tips to throw her out, but this results in Felicia thinking that Harry is proposing.
99	12	"George Finds a Father"	Jack Shea	T : Paul M. Belous & Robert Wolterstorff; S/T : Kurt Taylor & John Donley	December 20, 1978
The Christmas season brings old friends Buddy and Zeke to the Jefferson apartment. With them comes along a long buried secret, one that George can't handle: Buddy and George's mother were once lovers.
100	13	"Louise's Sister"	Jack Shea	Bob Baublitz	January 3, 1979
George is planning a surprise party for Louise, with the gift of a surprise visit from her sister, Maxine. When Louise has a strange reaction to her sister, George is puzzled. He does not know that her reasons stem from her and Maxine's childhood, when Maxine ran off and left Louise to care for their mother all by herself. However, the truth behind Maxine’s actions comes to light when her son arrives at the apartment. (Note: This is the only time viewers see Louise's sister, Maxine.)
101	14	"Louise's Reunion"	Jack Shea	Howard Albrecht & Sol Weinstein	January 10, 1979
On the evening of her class reunion, Louise discovers in George's will that all of his money would go to her on the condition that she never remarries, prompting an argument resulting in Louise attending her reunion without George. He eventually follows her and apologizes, and they enjoy the reunion together.
102	15	"A Bedtime Story"	Jack Shea	Stephen Neigher	January 24, 1979
George is trying to hide his impotence from Louise and explores several means to cure his problem, including oysters, medications and even a sex therapist.
103	16	"Florence Meets Mr. Right"	Jack Shea	Peter Casey & David Lee	January 31, 1979
Florence's meets her latest boyfriend, Buzz Thatcher at church and he proposes marriage, which she happily accepts. However, his outrageous religious attitudes about life give Louise a bad feeling about the whole thing. (Note: Larry McCormick, then an anchor/reporter for KTLA News, portrayed Thatcher.)
104	17	"Louise's Award"	Jack Shea	M. Martez Thomas	February 7, 1979
Louise is excited that she's being considered to receive the Volunteer of the Year award due to her work down at the Help Center. However, what she doesn't know is that George is planning to make sure she wins the award by bribing one of the judges.
105	18	"The Other Woman"	Jack Shea	S : Jack Shea; T : Jerry Perzigian & Donald L. Seigel	February 21, 1979
Tom's business trip sparks an argument between him and Helen, which worsens when she discovers that a beautiful blonde (Judy Landers) is accompanying him. In reality, Tom’s boss has been sleeping with the blonde, and Helen blackmails him so that Tom can skip the business trip without losing his job, allowing him to reconcile with Helen.
106	19	"The Hold Out"	Jack Shea	S : Bernard Burnell Mack; T : Bryan Joseph	February 28, 1979
George becomes the holdout when he refuses to sell his first store to a company who is buying up all the buildings on the block. His strategy is to hold out to increase the offer, despite the fact that the company plans to build an expensive apartment building, which would put those living there now out on the street.
107	20	"The Ones You Love"	Jack Shea	Stephen Neigher	March 7, 1979
Tom and Alan's fight causes a fight to erupt between George and Louise on the same evening that a reporter from Black Life Magazine is to interview them on the subject of happily married life. They try everything to keep up a happy facade, but the reporter tells them that fighting is part of what makes them a happy couple.
108	21	"Every Night Fever"	Jack Shea	Bryan Joseph	March 28, 1979
Louise turns down an offer to perform in a play being put on by the Help Center because she wants to spend her evenings with George. However, after an evening at a disco, George catches disco fever and begins spending all night every night at the local disco.
109	22	"Three Faces of Florence"	Jack Shea	S : Bernard Burnell Mack; T : Paul M. Belous & Robert Wolterstorff	April 4, 1979
Florence is reading a novel in which a woman pretends to be different people, giving Florence the idea to act like different people herself to attract men. While down at the Help Center, she tries it out on a man who, unknown to her, is a psychiatrist, who becomes convinced Florence has multiple personalities.
110	23	"Louise's Convention"	Jack Shea	Paul M. Belous & Robert Wolterstorff	April 11, 1979
Helen gives Louise the news that both of them have been invited to California to attend a convention. However, the planned trip coincides with the date of her wedding anniversary. Meanwhile, George mistakenly plans a business meeting on his anniversary. Later at home, he happily allows Louise to go to California, and his joy arouses suspicions in her. (Notes: Sheryl Lee Ralph makes a guest appearance, and Jay Hammer makes his final appearance as Allan Willis.)
111	24	"The Freeze-In"	Jack Shea	T : Jerry Perzigian & Donald L. Seigel; S/T : Jay Moriarty & Mike Milligan	April 18, 1979
When the heat goes out in a few of the apartments in the building, Harry, Tom and Helen convene at the Jeffersons' heated apartment, causing cramped space and sore feelings.

=== Season 6 (1979–80) ===
No. overall	No. in season	Title	Directed by	Written by	Original release date
112	1	"The Announcement"	Bob Lally	Jay Moriarty & Mike Milligan	September 23, 1979
Lionel and Jenny have some wonderful news: Jenny is pregnant. However, they only share the news with Tom and Helen, because Lionel doesn't want George making jokes about what color the baby will be. However, when Florence overhears the news during the funeral for Bentley’s parakeet, she accidentally lets slip to Louise who, in turn, tells George, which leads to yet another argument between George and Lionel. George later has a heart to heart with Jenny and they apologize to each other. (Notes: The series is now airing on Sundays until January 1985. Mike Evans returns to the role of Lionel Jefferson, the character he originated.)
113	2	"A Short Story"	Bob Lally	Neil Lebowitz	September 30, 1979
George is ecstatic when he learns he's been named Small Businessman of the Year. However, Louise quickly learns that the basis of the award is purely physical: the award is to honor short businessmen. Not wanting to ruin George’s happiness, Louise doesn’t tell him this, but he finds out for himself at the banquet.
114	3	"Louise's Old Boyfriend"	Bob Lally	Jerry Perzigian & Donald L. Seigel	October 7, 1979
Louise is excited when she receives a letter from her old boyfriend, Bill Simpson, asking her out to dinner. However, she decides not to go because she knows George will be upset if she does. Therefore, Florence secretly goes out to dinner with Bill and pretends to be Louise, but things get really confusing for Bill when Louise changes her mind and shows up with George in tow.
115	4	"Now You See It, Now You Don't: Part 1"	Bob Lally	T : Mary-David Sheiner; S/T : Sheila Judis Weisberg	October 21, 1979
It's Halloween, and the Jeffersons and the Willises are gearing up for a costume contest. They're each going as old movie stars: George as Charlie Chaplin, Florence as Harpo Marx, Tom and Helen as Laurel and Hardy, etc. Meanwhile, Harry brings his telescope over onto the Jeffersons' balcony to view a specific star, leading to Louise taking a peek, but what she sees is totally unexpected—she sees someone dressed as a rabbit murder someone. Note : Berlinda Tolbert and Mike Evans do not appear in this episode.
116	5	"Now You See It, Now You Don't: Part 2"	Bob Lally	S : Susan Straughn Harris; T : Peter Casey & David Lee	October 28, 1979
While George and the others are gathered in the bar waiting for the costume contest to start, Louise has a face-to-face confrontation in her apartment with the killer rabbit, who's now planning to make her his second victim. When the rest of the gang all get trapped in the apartment as well, the situation turns comedic and leads to them all managing to overpower the rabbit. Note: Berlinda Tolbert and Mike Evans do not appear in the episode.
117	6	"Where's Papa?"	Bob Lally	Peter Casey & David Lee	November 4, 1979
While going through a lot of old items, George and Louise discover an old will which belonged to his father. The will states that his father wanted to be buried next to Mother Jefferson, so George sets out to fulfill his wish, but quickly discovers that this is no easy task.
118	7	"The Expectant Father"	Bob Lally	Michael G. Moye	November 11, 1979
Lionel becomes overwhelmed with advice on being a father when he and Jenny arrive at the Jefferson apartment, which prompts him to storm out.
119	8	"Joltin' George"	Bob Lally	Jerry Perzigian & Donald L. Seigel	November 18, 1979
George takes Marcus to the gym to teach him how to box, after the boyfriend of a girl that Marcus made a move on beats him up. However, George's big mouth gets him in the ring with another boxer (Luis Avalos), but George is confident that he'll win, since he used to be called "Joltin' George".
120	9	"Baby Love"	Bob Lally	Joanne Pagliaro	December 2, 1979
With all the excitement over Jenny's pregnancy, Florence begins to hear her biological clock ticking, prompting her to find a prospective husband and father through a dating service.
121	10	"Louise vs. Florence"	Bob Lally	S : Paul M. Belous & Robert Wolterstorff; T : Jerry Perzigian & Donald L. Seigel	December 9, 1979
Louise is to present a volunteer award and must take care of the engraving on the plaque. However, when Florence takes it to her boyfriend, he misspells the name, leading to a huge fight between Florence and Louise, which results in Louise firing her. When George hires her back to serve some guests he's entertaining, constant bickering erupts. However, when the snooty guests insult Florence, Louise stands up for her and they make amends. Florence manages to get the plaque fixed in time for the ceremony.
122	11	"Me and Mr. G."	Bob Lally	Michael G. Moye	December 30, 1979
Louise is excited when she gets to have an orphan stay at the Jeffersons' apartment for a week. However, when she and Florence go out to the store and leave George in charge, some of his prejudiced attitudes rub off on the impressionable young lady. What was supposed to be a week's stay turns into only a few hours.
123	12	"One Flew Into the Cuckoo's Nest"	Bob Lally	Peter Casey & David Lee	January 6, 1980
While making a dry cleaning delivery to a mental institution, George is accidentally mistaken as a mental patient when the real patient escapes disguised as George.
124	13	"Louise's Setback"	Bob Lally	Robert Wolterstorff	January 13, 1980
Louise is ecstatic when she learns that a television documentary will be done on the suicide helpline available at the Help Center and she will be interviewed. However, in the midst of all the excitement, Louise inadvertently neglects a teenage girl, who later swallows a bottle of pills. When Louise learns of this, she is devastated and refuses to do the show, but George reassures her that one mistake won’t overshadow her past success.
125	14	"Brother Tom"	Bob Lally	Jerry Perzigian & Donald L. Seigel	January 27, 1980
When two old friends of Helen's come for a visit, Tom feels like a "white" outsider in his own home, prompting him to ask George to teach him how to "act black".
126	15	"The Arrival: Part 1"	Bob Lally	Neil Lebowitz	February 3, 1980
George and Louise are disappointed at the news that, if Lionel gets the job for which he's being interviewed, Jenny and he will have to move to Boston. Meanwhile, when Tom comes down with the flu, he can't take Jenny to her Lamaze class, which prompts George to take her. However, when the class is over and everyone has gone, George gets stuck there with Jenny, who has gone into labor.
127	16	"The Arrival: Part 2"	Bob Lally	Michael G. Moye	February 10, 1980
George rushes Jenny to the hospital as she begins having contractions. Meanwhile, Lionel is offered the job in Boston, and returns from the interview to learn the news that Jenny has gone into labor. At the hospital, the family gathers and George begins to worry about the baby's skin color.
128	17	"The Shower"	Bob Lally	Anthony & Celia Bonaduce	February 17, 1980
George and Louise are happily planning a belated baby shower for Jenny and Lionel. However, as soon as the shower begins, a workaholic Lionel walks out, leaving behind a lonely wife.
129	18	"The Longest Day"	Bob Lally	Bob Baublitz	February 24, 1980
When Louise, Helen, Florence and Jenny go out for the day, George, Tom and Lionel are left to take care of baby Jessica. They soon find out that taking care of a baby is no easy chore, and the Jefferson apartment begins to slowly turn to shambles.
130	19	"George's Birthday"	Bob Lally	Jerry Perzigian & Donald L. Seigel	March 2, 1980
Louise is planning a surprise party for George's 50th birthday and has invited all of his friends to meet up at the Willises' for the party. Meanwhile, George gets the idea to throw a birthday party for himself and finds all his friends refusing to attend, leading him to wallow in Charlie's bar.
131	20	"A Night to Remember"	Bob Lally	S : Stephen A. Miller; T : Peter Casey & David Lee	March 9, 1980
On their anniversary, George and Louise get into an argument over his honesty, prompting George to storm out to a hotel, and Louise is left to think about George's fidelity. Things get worse when she arrives at his hotel and discovers a young woman in his room.
132	21	"The Loan"	Bob Lally	S : Anthony & Celia Bonaduce; T : Peter Casey & David Lee	March 23, 1980
Lionel and Jenny are excited at the prospect of purchasing a home. However, when the bank turns down their loan application, George, Louise, Helen and Tom each go to the bank to help them get a loan, after each one promises not to interfere.
133	22	"Louise Takes a Stand"	Bob Lally	Bryan Joseph, Jerry Perzigian & Donald L. Seigel	March 30, 1980
George is excited when he learns he will be able to expand his store on the first floor of the building. However, his excitement starts to dwindle when he learns the expansion means taking over Charlie's bar, since Charlie's lease is not being renewed.
134	23	"The First Store"	Bob Lally	Jay Moriarty & Mike Milligan	April 6, 1980
As Louise and George look through old photos, they recall George opening his first store in April 1968. His opening coincides with the assassination of Martin Luther King Jr. and, as news of King's death circulates, chaos erupts in the Jeffersons' neighborhood.
135	24	"Once Upon a Time"	Bob Lally	Michael G. Moye	April 13, 1980
While babysitting his granddaughter Jessica, George entertains her with his version of King Arthur—"King George". In his tale, King George defends his kingdom from the evil Inflation.

=== Season 7 (1980–81) ===
No. overall	No. in season	Title	Directed by	Written by	Original release date
136	1	"Marathon Men"	Bob Lally	Howard Bendetson & Bob Bendetson	November 2, 1980
It's the match of the century as perennial rivals George and Tom make plans to run each other into the ground in a 26-mile marathon. Louise and Helen doubt if they'll survive the strenuous training, much less the race.
137	2	"The Jeffersons Go to Hawaii: Part 1"	Bob Lally	Michael G. Moye	November 9, 1980
After George is told by his doctor that he is at high risk for a heart attack, he and Louise plan a trip to Hawaii. Florence accompanies them and, when they arrive, they encounter Tom and Helen, who are staying at the same hotel and have decided to extend their vacation.
138	3	"The Jeffersons Go to Hawaii: Part 2"	Bob Lally	Jay Moriarty, Mike Milligan & Michael G. Moye	November 16, 1980
139	4	"The Jeffersons Go to Hawaii: Part 3"	Bob Lally	Jay Moriarty, Mike Milligan & Michael G. Moye	November 16, 1980
The Willises' presence in Hawaii threatens to destroy George's plan for a dream vacation with Louise but, despite this, his high blood pressure begins to lower, convincing him that it might be healthy to stay in the islands permanently. Enthusiastic about his idea of remaining in Hawaii permanently, George tries to enlist Tom's help to persuade Louise. Then George and Tom get lost sailing.
140	5	"The Jeffersons Go to Hawaii: Part 4"	Bob Lally	Jay Moriarty, Mike Milligan & Michael G. Moye	November 23, 1980
After their boat capsizes, George and Tom end up on an island where the friendly natives want to stop a greedy real estate developer, who turns out to be the developer with whom George wants to invest.
141	6	"Put It On"	Bob Lally	S : Stephanie Haden; T : Howard Bendetson & Bob Bendetson	November 30, 1980
It could be Full Monty time when Tom and George follow the women to an all-male strip show.
142	7	"Florence's Cousin"	Bob Lally	Marshall Goldberg	December 7, 1980
Florence's cousin Ernie drops by for a "visit". He lies and tells Florence that he needs $1,000 for a record store. Ernie gets the money from George and runs off to Miami with it. Florence winds up working in a restaurant behind George's back to recover the money. When George finds out, he fires Florence. However, after seeing how mean the manager treats her, George decides to hire her back.
143	8	"All I Want for Christmas"	Bob Lally	David W. Duclon & Ron Leavitt	December 21, 1980
George gets carried away after playing Santa for the orphans at the Help Center and promises them they will get anything they want for Christmas. A bitter orphan takes him up on it when he asks for parents.
144	9	"Calendar Girl"	Bob Lally	David Silverman & Stephen Sustarsic	January 4, 1981
George and Louise secretly defy Lionel and Jenny to enter infant Jessica in a contest, then manage to misplace the child in the process.
145	10	"As Florence Turns"	Bob Lally	Peter Casey & David Lee	January 11, 1981
Florence's vivid imagination transforms the Jeffersons and their friends into characters in a soap opera, in which the evil dry cleaning magnate G.R. (George) (parody of JR Ewing) torments his family and associates to their murderous limits.
146	11	"God Bless Americans"	Bob Lally	Peter Casey & David Lee	January 18, 1981
George's upcoming appearance on a local television talk show is jeopardized when the super-patriotic host learns that George is sponsoring a Cuban refugee.
147	12	"Alley Oops"	Bob Lally	Jerry Perzigian & Donald L. Seigel	January 25, 1981
George's star bowler gets sick before the semi-finals in a bowling tournament and it's up to Tom, who hasn't bowled in 30 years, to save the day.
148	13	"And the Doorknobs Shined Like Diamonds"	Bob Lally	Michael G. Moye	February 1, 1981
When Louise finds out that the house she grew up in is being torn down, she decides to go back and visit it. She recalls memories from her childhood, including flashback scenes involving her sister Maxine and her mother.
149	14	"Sorry, Wrong Meeting"	Bob Lally	Peter Casey & David Lee	February 15, 1981
Louise and Florence attend a CPR class, in which they run into members of the Ku Klux Klan. After Tom is robbed, he decides to arrange a tenants meeting. Unaware that it's a KKK meeting, Tom, George and Harry Bentley all attend, and an ugly argument flares up. The leader of the group (James Karen) has a heart attack and George saves him by giving him CPR, but he is ungrateful about it. However, the leader's son (Ike Eisenmann) is appreciative of what George did and, as a result, quits the group.
150	15	"My Hero"	Bob Lally	S : David Silverman & Stephen Sustarsic; T : Jerry Perzigian, Donald L. Seigel, Peter Casey & David Lee	February 22, 1981
George basks in the limelight after heroically saving an elderly woman from a mugger and capturing the thug. When the man escapes custody and sets out to get even, George hires a bodyguard. Guest star: Irwin Keyes as Hugo.
151	16	"I Buy the Songs"	Bob Lally	S : Jerry Perzigian, Donald L. Seigel, Peter Casey & David Lee; T :	March 1, 1981
Not only does George fail in comparison to Tom in romantic gifts to his wife, he also forgets Valentine's Day. George makes it up to Louise in a song.
152	17	"Small Fish, Big Pond"	Bob Lally	Michael G. Moye	March 8, 1981
George exaggerates his financial standing to gain membership into one of New York's most exclusive businessmen's clubs and soon finds himself in over his head.
153	18	"Not So Dearly Beloved"	Bob Lally	S : Fred S. Fox & Seaman Jacobs; T : David Silverman & Stephen Sustarsic	March 15, 1981
George searches for the right words to express his feelings in a eulogy for an employee who died when George fired him. The task proves to be harder than expected, since the man was a philanderer and a bully. George eventually gives a eulogy where all of the deceased’s bad qualities are twisted to sound like praise, but silently trashes the man’s memory in his mind, as do several other people at the funeral.
154	19	"Florence's New Job"	Bob Lally	Jay Moriarty & Mike Milligan	March 29, 1981
155	20	"Florence's New Job"	Bob Lally	Jay Moriarty & Mike Milligan	March 29, 1981
Florence is offered a job as an executive housekeeper at the fictional St. Frederick Hotel. (Note: This episode served as the transition to Marla Gibbs' short-lived spinoff series, Checking In.)

=== Season 8 (1981–82) ===
No. overall	No. in season	Title	Directed by	Written by	Original release date
156	1	"The Separation: Part 1"	Bob Lally	S : Jay Moriarty & Mike Milligan; T : Howard Bendetson & Bob Bendetson	October 4, 1981
Louise and George are heartbroken when they discover Lionel and Jenny are having marital problems that result in a separation, prompting George, Louise, Helen and Tom to convene to try to get them back together.
157	2	"The Separation: Part 2"	Bob Lally	S : Jay Moriarty & Mike Milligan; T : Nancy Vince & Ted Dale	October 11, 1981
Due to the separation, Lionel is living at home with George and Louise, prompting George to trick a marriage counselor into showing up at the Jeffersons' apartment, with the intention of bringing Lionel and Jenny back together.
158	3	"Louise's Father"	Bob Lally	Jerry Perzigian & Donald L. Seigel	October 18, 1981
A newspaper photo alerts George to the fact that the man in the photo could very well be Louise's long-lost father, since they both have the same name. Louise refuses to entertain this notion, since she believes that her father died when she was young. However, George learns the truth after visiting the man; he really is Louise's father, but he doesn't ever want Louise to know it. George ultimately agrees to keep the secret.
159	4	"My Maid, Your Maid"	Bob Lally	Peter Casey, David Lee, Jerry Perzigian, Donald L. Seigel	October 25, 1981
With Florence working at a new job, Louise and George decide to hire a new maid. However, George and Louise are at odds when they each have separate candidates in mind for the position.
160	5	"I've Still Got It"	Bob Lally	Fred S. Fox & Seaman Jacobs	November 1, 1981
George has become convinced that age is taking its toll on him, with a receding hairline and larger midsection. In an attempt to revitalize him, Louise sends him some flowers with a seductive note to his office. However, George becomes convinced the flowers are from his secretary (Vernee Watson).
161	6	"Florence Did It Different: Part 1"	Bob Lally	Michael G. Moye	November 8, 1981
Constant bickering between George and Carmen prompts Louise to tell Carmen how Florence handled George (via flashbacks). However, just as Carmen gets a handle on how to handle George, Florence shows up with news that the hotel burned down and she would like her old job back.
162	7	"Florence Did It Different: Part 2"	Bob Lally	Michael G. Moye	November 15, 1981
When Florence learns the Jeffersons have hired a new maid she decides to let Carmen have the job. However, Carmen doesn't want to take Florence's job away from her so she decides to let her have it. With both Florence and Carmen at odds over who should keep the job, Louise decides to hire them both. However, on the sly, Florence makes plans to get fired.
163	8	"The House That George Built"	Bob Lally	Jerry Perzigian & Donald L. Seigel	November 29, 1981
George wants everyone to remember him when he dies, so he sets out to remake himself into a legend. First he tries writing a book about his life, but changes his mind and does the unthinkable: he buys a building and turns it into the George Jefferson Museum, complete with exhibits about his life and times.
164	9	"A Whole Lot of Trouble"	Bob Lally	Jerry Perzigian & Donald L. Seigel	December 6, 1981
Louise is furious when she learns that George is the businessman who plans on building over a local children's playground. However, George has second thoughts after he makes a visit to the playground.
165	10	"I've Got a Secret"	Bob Lally	Peter Casey, David Lee, Jerry Perzigian & Donald L. Seigel	December 20, 1981
When George discovers Louise is keeping a diary, he goes all out to try to read it, including staying up all night to try to wriggle it out of Louise's clutches. However, one day when she leaves it unguarded, George takes a peek and is shocked by its contents, which detail a number of affairs that Louise appears to be carrying on. However, the diary he's reading is actually a fake that Louise left out on purpose to teach him a lesson. Louise then reads George an entry from her real diary, which expresses her love for him.
166	11	"A Charmed Life"	Bob Lally	Peter Casey & David Lee	December 27, 1981
George doesn't understand why he wasn't invited to a posh gala event at the Whittendale apartment, until Tom, Helen, Louise and Florence break the news the Whittendales "hates his guts." Wanting to earn some respect, George takes charm lessons in order to live up to the standards of the behavior of "rich folks."
167	12	"Thammy the Thongwriter"	Bob Lally	David W. Duclon & Ron Leavitt	January 3, 1982
George and Louise receive a postcard from Harry, who's been transferred out of the country. Soon after, they meet the man who's moving into Harry's old apartment, a jingle writer whom George tries to get to write a jingle for his business. However, jingles are far from his mind, since he's having marital problems.
168	13	"I Spy"	Bob Lally	Sara V. Finney	January 17, 1982
Helen's comments that Tom hasn't been paying any attention to her fuel George's belief that she is having an affair, especially after he sees her and another man having lunch together, leading George to bring Tom to the restaurant to see for himself. Tom winds up making a fool of himself trying to win Helen back, which is futile since the other man is just a colleague.: Recording date: November 17, 1981
169	14	"Dog-Gone"	Bob Lally	Mark Rothman & Jeffrey Duteil	January 24, 1982
George has the task of taking care of Mr. Whittendale's wife's pet Doberman. However, when a freak accident occurs ending in the dog's death, George is scared that he will end up on the streets. Thankfully, Mr. Whittendale actually hated the dog and is glad to have it gone, so while he fakes anger for his wife's benefit, he privately thanks George and even agrees to do business with him. (Note: Ivor Francis plays Mr. Whittendale, with his wife being the wealthy spouse. This contradicts other appearances of Mr. Whittendale - played by Jack Fletcher - where Mr. Whittendale is the wealthy spouse. In Season One "Mr. Piano Man", Francis plays Mr. Whittendale's representative.)
170	15	"Blazing Jeffersons"	Bob Lally	S : David W. Duclon & Ron Leavitt; T : Jerry Perzigian, Donald L. Seigel, Peter Casey & David Lee	January 31, 1982
George is distraught when he learns that his Brooklyn store has burned down due to faulty wiring. However, Tom raises his spirits by reminding him that his insurance will cover it by taking to court the person responsible for the faulty wiring. Then George remembers who put in the wiring: Lionel. George is now torn between paying for the repairs out of his own pocket or having his own son prosecuted for negligence. (Notes: This is Mike Evans' final appearance as a regular cast member. Evans would return to the show in season 11)
171	16	"Men of the Cloth"	Bob Lally	Michael G. Moye	February 7, 1982
For Jessica's baptism, Louise wants Florence and her gospel singing group to perform, and Jenny agrees with her. However, George wants someone else and sets out to get Andraé Crouch to perform at the baptism, going so far as to say he is a reverend.
172	17	"A Case of Self-Defense"	Bob Lally	Jeffrey Richman & Joyce Gittlin	February 21, 1982
When Lionel's and Jenny's apartment is broken into, George begins to worry that his apartment could just as easily be broken into. His solution: buy a gun, something that Louise is totally against. However, George buys one on the sly, and it later proves to be a dangerous possession when it accidentally falls into baby Jessica's hands.
173	18	"My Wife, I Think I'll Keep Her"	Bob Lally	Peter Casey & David Lee	March 7, 1982
Upset that their husbands do not feel they should be involved in business matters, Louise and Helen move in together, leaving George and Tom to live together in the Jefferson apartment—all this prompted by George not consulting Louise about a commercial he was making and Tom's plans to proceed with publishing a book by written by a sexist.
174	19	"Guess Who's Not Coming to Dinner"	Bob Lally	Brian Pollack & Rick Shaw	March 14, 1982
Louise, George, Tom and Helen plan a surprise party for Florence to let her know how much they appreciate her friendship. However, when Florence walks in on the planning stages, Tom makes an excuse and tells her she's invited, but only to serve the meal, prompting Florence to drown her sorrows in a $500 bottle of wine George just bought.
175	20	"The Strays: Part 1"	Bob Lally	Michael G. Moye	March 21, 1982
For their anniversary, George decides to replace the setting on Louise's wedding ring. Meanwhile, one of George's messengers is robbed by an all-female street gang, who gets away with the week's proceeds. Trying to combat the gang, George is stabbed and left for dead, but not before they steal Louise's ring.
176	21	"The Strays: Part 2"	Bob Lally	Michael G. Moye	March 28, 1982
Determined to retrieve Louise's ring, a very sore George arrives at the gang's hideout while they are out, only to find that one of the members has stayed behind—and she's also pregnant. When she goes into labor, with no time to call an ambulance, George delivers the baby just as the rest of the gang returns. Thankful that he was there to save the new mother and her baby, the gang leader returns Louise's ring to George.
177	22	"Jefferson's Greatest Hits"	Bob Lally	Ralph Phillips	April 11, 1982
A record producer follows Florence home from church after hearing her gospel singing. At the Jeffersons' apartment, he offers Florence the chance to make a record in exchange for $1,200. Smelling a con, Louise and George try to stop Florence from making a big mistake that would cost her dearly.
178	23	"A Small Victory"	Bob Lally	David W. Duclon & Ron Leavitt	April 18, 1982
Louise and Helen consider leaving the Help Center due to lack of involvement from others and lack of funds. However, just as they're about to call it quits, a young hooker named Maggie walks in the door.
179	24	"Lesson in Love"	Bob Lally	Jerry Perzigian & Donald L. Seigel	May 2, 1982
Florence becomes depressed when her latest boyfriend doesn't call her for a second date. She later is asked out by a police officer (Kene Holliday), and in order to keep him interested in her, George gives Florence some tips on what men like in a woman. However, when Florence puts George's advice into practice, it soon backfires on her.
180	25	"Do Not Forsake Me, Oh, My Helen"	Bob Lally	Peter Casey & David Lee	May 16, 1982
Helen gets an invitation to have lunch with an old boyfriend and Tom is seething with jealousy, leading him to have a dream about the Old West, where he has a shootout with Pecos Darryl, a man after Helen's heart.

=== Season 9 (1982–83) ===
No. overall	No. in season	Title	Directed by	Written by	Original release date
181	1	"Laundry Is a Tough Town: Part 1"	Bob Lally	S : Elliot Stern; T : Kurt Taylor & Mark Miller	September 26, 1982
George is in a price war with Big Sky Cleaners with no holds barred. A representative from Big Sky comes to the Jeffersons' apartment, offering to buy George out, and he refuses. When Big Sky comes out with a one-millionth customer gimmick, George tries to find his own gimmick, and people with "talent" swamp the apartment, including a bearded lady and a lion tamer. But when Louise goes to Big Sky to end this battle, she becomes their one-millionth customer, leading George to decide to sell out.
182	2	"Laundry Is a Tough Town: Part 2"	Bob Lally	David W. Duclon, Ron Leavitt & Michael G. Moye	October 3, 1982
George has decided to sell out to Big Sky Cleaners, and he begins to hang around the apartment as if he already has retired, driving Florence and Louise up the wall, when he gets into the habit of giving advice to everyone he meets. However, George soon has second thoughts about giving up his business.
183	3	"Anatomy of a Stain"	Bob Lally	Peter Casey & David Lee	October 10, 1982
When Tom gets his pants back from Jefferson Cleaners with a stain on them, he wants a refund, but George refuses, saying it was Tom's fault for leaving a candy bar in the pocket. They take their case to a TV court show.
184	4	"Social Insecurity"	Bob Lally	Jerry Perzigian & Donald L. Seigel	October 17, 1982
Florence is unsure of the future when she realizes she doesn't have any financial security, prompting her to ask George for a pension plan, something he flatly refuses.
185	5	"Charlie's Angels"	Bob Lally	Neil Lebowitz	October 24, 1982
Charlie wants George to provide him with a loan for some improvements on his bar. George refuses, but does offer him some advice regarding how to get attract more business, including hiring waitresses and dressing them provocatively. This leads Charlie to go to Tom, who goes in on the deal, and the bar is quickly buzzing with business, something George now wants a part of.
186	6	"Heeeere's Johnny"	Bob Lally	Michael G. Moye	October 31, 1982
Louise is not looking forward to the visit of one of George's best friends, Johnny Moore, because she can't stand his chauvinistic jokester mannerisms. Things get worse when she inadvertently gets him to stay at the Jeffersons' apartment during his stay in New York.
187	7	"A Date with Danger"	Bob Lally	Peter Casey & David Lee	November 7, 1982
At a party thrown by the Willises, the guest of honor, Joe Blake, a successful author, asks Florence out, and she can't wait to go out with him. However, soon after he takes her on their date, Tom and Helen inform George and Louise that he was in prison for murdering his girlfriend.
188	8	"Death Smiles on a Dry Cleaner: Part 1"	Bob Lally	David W. Duclon, Ron Leavitt, Jerry Perzigian & Donald L. Seigel	November 21, 1982
For George's birthday, Louise books herself, George and Florence on a murder mystery cruise ship for mystery novelists, so George pretends to be a novelist. He is having fun trying to solve a murder mystery, until an apparently "real" murder occurs. Bernard Fox, Russell Johnson, and Edie McClurg guest star in both parts as the other mystery writers on the cruise.
189	9	"Death Smiles on a Dry Cleaner: Part 2"	Bob Lally	David W. Duclon, Ron Leavitt, Jerry Perzigian & Donald L. Seigel	November 28, 1982
The novelists try to solve the apparently "real" murder, with George trying his best to solve it, as well. When it is determined that the victim, Edgar, was poisoned, the crew deduces that the Duchess did it, but George discovers the real culprit.
190	10	"Appointment in 8-B"	Bob Lally	David W. Duclon & Ron Leavitt	December 12, 1982
George stops by 8-B, Ms. Sanderson's apartment, to drop off her cleaning. Soon after he leaves, Ralph stops by and hears Ms. Sanderson having sex with a man named George, and Ralph quickly jumps to the wrong conclusion.
191	11	"Poetic Justice"	Bob Lally	Lou Messina & Diane Messina Stanley	December 19, 1982
Louise discovers some old poems by George and decides to have them bound in a book. In order to get the book bound, she must order a minimum number of copies, which end up in the hands of several of their neighbors in the building. George is furious, but his attitude changes when a publisher shows an interest.
192	12	"How Now Dow Jones"	Bob Lally	Peter Casey & David Lee	December 26, 1982
George's investment advice for Tom proves fruitful and puts Helen in a fur coat, prompting Florence to want to make some money, so she asks George for advice. However, since she doesn't have enough money for investing, he suggests she go in on the venture with the other maids in the building. The results of the ordeal prove to be less than satisfying—for George anyway.
193	13	"The Defiant Ones"	Bob Lally	Jeffrey Richman & Joyce Gittlin	January 2, 1983
While going through a box of mementos, George refuses to allow Louise to see a certain picture and decides to put it in his store safe. Determined to see it, and with Helen in tow, Louise tries to break into the store safe, but both women end up in jail.
194	14	"My Maid... My Wife"	Bob Lally	S : Michael Poryes; T : Marilyn Anderson & Wayne Kline	January 9, 1983
Florence runs into an old classmate, Pauline, and finds out that she has married money. This prompts a jealous Florence to say that she, too, married wealth—George, leading to Louise posing as the maid and Florence posing as Louise when Pauline comes over for dinner.
195	15	"Mr. Wonderful"	Bob Lally	Jerry Perzigian & Donald L. Seigel	January 16, 1983
George forgets to pick up opera tickets, leading Louise and Helen to comparing him to the "thoughtful" Tom. A miffed George spills the beans about Tom buying an insurance policy and naming as the beneficiary a racist cousin who disapproves of Tom and Helen's marriage.
196	16	"My Girl, Louise"	Bob Lally	Sandy Sprung & Marcy Vosburgh	January 23, 1983
With the Help Center on its last legs, Louise and Helen desperately try to find someone who could make a sizable donation to keep the center going. Louise goes to her ex-employer, Lillian Warren, whom Louise worked for as a maid and who treated her like a piece of furniture.
197	17	"Bodyguards Are People Too"	Bob Lally	Brent Stevens & Wade Stevens	January 30, 1983
Jenny is depressed that no one will take a chance on her fashion designs, so she stops by the Jeffersons' apartment for a visit. Meanwhile, George's bodyguard, Hugo, is determined to find love now that, as he puts it, he is in the spring of his life. When he runs into Jenny, he falls for her and is determined to make her his, even though she's married.
198	18	"True Confessions"	Bob Lally	S : Lewis Goldstein; T : Peter Casey & David Lee	February 6, 1983
George and Louise prepare for a visit from their foster son Jimmy, but they are in for the shock of their lives when they discover that he is a grown man who's supposedly been using the money they've sent them on his education. Guest star: Garrett Morris as Jimmy.
199	19	"Mr. Clean"	Bob Lally	Carole Olson & Marita Epp	February 13, 1983
George and his poker buddies make a mess of the living room, so Florence stays up all night cleaning and is exhausted the next morning, leading George to make a bet with Florence that he can do in three hours what she does in a day.
200	20	"The Good Life"	Bob Lally	Michael G. Moye	February 20, 1983
The good life is striking everyone: George has hit success with the stocks, allowing Louise to purchase a ring she wanted; Tom has just gotten a new client; and Helen has just been pampered at a spa, where she met famous celebrities. Wanting in on the "good life," Florence shells out enough money to go to the spa and unknowingly runs into Gladys Knight.
201	21	"Father's Day"	Bob Lally	S : Hans Kracauer; T : Jerry Perzigian & Donald L. Seigel	March 6, 1983
A young boy befriends Louise and Helen, and they become convinced that he has a crush on one of them. But the real reason he befriends them is to get to George, wanting to ask George if he would participate in a father-son bowling tournament, since his father is supposedly dead. However, the boy does, indeed, have a father who's alive, but not so well: he's a paraplegic.
202	22	"Change of a Dollar"	Bob Lally	Ron Leavitt & Michael G. Moye	March 13, 1983
On the night of a big banquet for Tom, George runs out at the last minute to run an errand at his store in Queens. There, viewers are taken back to 1968 and witness the grand opening of Jefferson Cleaners, and how George earned his first dollar.
203	23	"Designing Woman"	Bob Lally	Patrick Egan & Ilene Cooper	March 20, 1983
George is trying to drum up some cleaning business from a famous fashion designer, Camille Hendricks. He tricks Jenny into swinging by the apartment to meet her in order to show her some of her designs, but Jenny is unprepared for this surprise.
204	24	"Double Trouble"	Bob Lally	S : Patrick Egan & Ilene Cooper; T : Hans Kracauer	March 27, 1983
George is in yet another promotional battle with Cunningham. This time, Cunningham has hired a popular soap star to boost sales, so George tries to get celebrities, too. However, his idea may get him into trouble with the law when he hires celebrity lookalikes and tries to pass them off as the real things.
205	25	"Silver Lining"	Bob Lally	S : Jerry Perzigian & Donald L. Seigel; T : Peter Casey & David Lee	April 3, 1983
An auction is held to raise money for the Help Center, and Florence gets a big surprise when she discovers $2,500 stuffed into the lining of a hat that she buys. She turns the money in to the police, hoping no one will claim it, and no one does. However, just as Florence thinks she'll get to keep the money, an apparent owner arrives at the apartment.
206	26	"The Wheel of Forever"	Bob Lally	Marcy Vosburgh & Sandy Sprung	April 10, 1983
When Florence asks for enough money to purchase a new TV set, George flatly refuses. She tries again, this time politely asking, and, again, George refuses, leading to George having a dream about entering the gates of heaven after Florence makes a comment that he'd never get by those gates if she held the key.
207	27	"Personal Business"	Bob Lally	S : Lewis Goldstein; T : Marcy Vosburgh & Sandy Sprung	May 1, 1983
When her marriage gets in a rut, Louise tries to spice it up by trying to get George to spend some time with her. But her idea turns into a disaster when they get into a bicycling accident that leaves them each with a broken leg.

=== Season 10 (1983–84) ===
No. overall	No. in season	Title	Directed by	Written by	Original release date
208	1	"Mission: Incredible: Part 1"	Oz Scott	Michael G. Moye	October 2, 1983
George has a reunion with some old navy buddies. The fact that Tom has become gullible becomes a topic of discussion, leading his old pals to talk him into playing a little con game on Tom to teach him a lesson. However, the con becomes a little too real when George's old pals Lloyd and Allan make off with $15,000 of Tom's money. Tom fears that Helen will divorce him if she finds out, since this was money which was to be used for a down payment on a house that has come up on the market.
209	2	"Mission: Incredible: Part 2"	Oz Scott	Michael G. Moye	October 3, 1983
A furious Tom almost kills George when he learns he's been hustled out of $15,000, money that he had planned to use to make a down payment on a house. George calls in Jimmy to help him get Tom's money back. Jimmy (Garrett Morris) talks George and Tom into flying to Los Angeles, where Lloyd and Allan have fled. Once there, they meet Jimmy's cousin (Greg Morris), a crafty man who has a well-planned-out way of getting Tom's money back. Meanwhile, Florence, who knows what George and Tom are up to, tells Louise and Helen and they rush to Los Angeles.
210	3	"Mission: Incredible: Part 3"	Oz Scott	Michael G. Moye	October 9, 1983
Jimmy's cousin puts his plan into effect, which includes getting Lloyd and Allan to believe that Los Angeles is going to be hit by a military attack from a neighboring country. However, the plan could be ruined when Louise, Helen and Florence arrive in Los Angeles.
211	4	"I Do, I Don't"	Oz Scott	Jeffrey Richman & Joyce Gittlin	October 16, 1983
Tom and Helen host a seminar for newlyweds, a job that George learns that he could be doing if Louise had not passed on it without telling him. When Tom falls ill, George gets his chance of showing newlyweds how to keep the spice in a marriage, something Louise won't believe until she sees it. Guest star include Helen Martin. Note: Helen Martin would appear with Marla Gibbs on 227 after The Jeffersons ended.
212	5	"How Not to Marry a Millionaire"	Oz Scott	Kim Weiskopf	October 23, 1983
Florence and her friend Betty go to the museum in hopes of landing millionaires. Florence is surprised when a millionaire follows her home and begins showering her with expensive gifts, but his true intentions prove to be extremely painful to Florence.
213	6	"And the Winner Is..."	Oz Scott	Neil Lebowitz	October 30, 1983
Louise is eyeing the Volunteer of the Year award for her work at the Help Center. She hopes to win, because last year's winner, Mrs. Van Morris, is away on a cruise. However, Mrs. Van Morris returns just in time to sway the award toward her side by donating $25,000 to the Help Center.
214	7	"The Return of Bentley"	Oz Scott	Peter Casey & David Lee	November 6, 1983
The Jeffersons and the Willises are excited by the news that Harry Bentley is returning to New York City. Mr. Whittendale is the one person standing in the way of Harry getting his old apartment back, and George quickly joins Whittendale's bandwagon when the new occupant of Bentley's old apartment could make George a lot of money.
215	8	"The List"	Oz Scott	Marty Farrell	November 20, 1983
George gets a letter from an old friend who had made a bet with George years ago that he could accomplish everything on his life goal list before George, leading George to dig out his old list and see that there is one thing he hasn't done: get even with a bully that picked on him when he was a kid.
216	9	"Who's the Fairest"	Oz Scott	Al Aidekman	December 4, 1983
For his latest promotion, George decides to hold a beauty contest to find Miss Jefferson Cleaners. Meanwhile, George's 10-year lease on his stores is up, and Mr. Whittendale holds the new lease. However, Whittendale will give it up only if his punk rocker niece (Julie Brown) wins the beauty contest.
217	10	"Father Christmas"	Oz Scott	S : Kevin Kelton; T : Jerry Perzigian & Donald L. Seigel	December 11, 1983
Refusing to go Christmas caroling with Louise, Helen, Florence and Mr. Bentley, George and Tom sit home decorating the tree, prompting reminiscences about past Christmases spent with their fathers. Sherman Helmsley and Franklin Cover play George and Tom's fathers in the flashback scenes.
218	11	"What Makes Sammy Run?"	Tony Singletary	Sara V. Finney	January 1, 1984
Louise discovers that Sammy Davis, Jr. is renting the apartment across the hall in order to get some peace and quiet from his fans, but an ecstatic Louise has a hard time keeping his secret.
219	12	"Getting Back to Basiks"	Tony Singletary	S : Rosalind Stevenson; T : Marcy Vosburgh & Sandy Sprung	January 8, 1984
George needs a new gimmick for his dry cleaning business, so he decides to hire Walter, an artist, to put together an animated commercial. Walter's job with George is threatened when Louise discovers that he cannot read.
220	13	"The Command Post"	Tony Singletary	Peter Casey & David Lee	January 15, 1984
Florence is sad because George and Louise are going on a vacation to Atlantic City without her, but she finds herself in the middle of excitement when she allows police officers to use the Jeffersons' apartment to stake out the neighbors across the street. When the situation turns dangerous, Florence ends up in the hospital. When George and Louise rush to the hospital, they mistake a heavily bandaged woman for Florence, who is actually in the bathroom. George then tells "Florence" how he actually sees her as one of the family.
221	14	"Real Man Don't Dry Clean"	Oz Scott	Ed Burnham & Elaine Newman	January 29, 1984
Louise, Helen and Florence are in awe of the rugged, manly instructor of their self-defense class, leading George and Tom to prove that they, too, are manly, and they decide to go on a hunting trip. After not getting anything on the trip, they hire a taxidermy company to bring in stuffed animals and brag that they caught them.
222	15	"Trading Places"	Oz Scott	Marcy Vosburgh & Sandy Sprung	February 12, 1984
Louise has had it with George, who breaks previous engagements with Tom and Mr. Bentley to go golfing, prompting Louise to daydream what it would be like to be in George's shoes and not care about the feelings of others.
223	16	"My Guy, George"	Oz Scott	S : Ron Leavitt; T : Jerry Perzigian & Donald L. Seigel	March 4, 1984
Florence manages to get George to become the manager of a struggling singing sister group (portrayed by Sister Sledge). On their opening night, the place where George booked them turns out to be a Texas style country western bar, and the reception from the audience is less than welcoming.
224	17	"A New Girl in Town"	Michael G. Moye	Marty Farrell	March 11, 1984
Florence is excited when she learns that her 18-year-old cousin, Rhonda, is coming to New York City for a visit, and Louise and Florence trick George into allowing her to stay with them. When Rhonda decides to move to the city permanently, the ensuing argument with Florence results in Rhonda moving out and getting a job as a mud wrestler.
225	18	"Otis"	Oz Scott	Michael G. Moye	March 18, 1984
George is excited about having a magazine exposé done on him and his cleaning business, but the magazine's plan to present a non-stereotypical view of blacks is a problem for Otis (Charles Lampkin), a shoeshine man who has his stand outside of George's Harlem store.
226	19	"Hart to Heart"	Oz Scott	Jerry Perzigian & Donald L. Seigel	March 25, 1984
Ralph, the doorman, wants a raise, and Louise and George give him the confidence he needs to ask Mr. Whittendale. However, the results are completely unexpected to him, when Mr. Whittendale announces that he will no longer be needed, since they're going to install an automatic door.
227	20	"George's Old Girlfriend"	Oz Scott	Kurt Taylor	April 1, 1984
In this curious return to the mood of the early seasons, Louise finds a perfume-soaked letter in the mail to George from an old girlfriend. After a discussion, Louise decides to allow him to meet with her, which turns out to be a big mistake. Soon after she arrives, she pulls a gun on him with the intent to kill him.
228	21	"Honeymoon Hotel"	Oz Scott	Jerry Perzigian & Donald L. Seigel	April 15, 1984
Tom and Helen's 30th wedding anniversary is anything but happy when they get into a big argument over where they should spend the day. They finally decide to go to the hotel where they spent their honeymoon. When they arrive, things go from bad to worse.
229	22	"In the Chips"	Arlando Smith	Peter Casey & David Lee	May 6, 1984
Jimmy arrives at the Jeffersons' apartment with a bag full of gambling chips and a wild story about how he got them. George discovers that the chips aren't Jimmy's, and a debt collector is on their tail, ready to repossess the chips at all costs.

=== Season 11 (1984–85) ===
No. overall	No. in season	Title	Directed by	Written by	Original release date
230	1	"Blood and Money"	Oz Scott	S : James Kutras; T : Jeffrey Richman & Joyce Gittlin	October 14, 1984
The Help Center is having a blood drive and Louise tries to get George to give some. A leery George pays Ralph to give blood in his name, but when the blood saves the life of Mrs. Whittendale, her husband decides to pay George back for his good deed and, of course, Ralph wants in.
231	2	"Ebony and Ivory"	Oz Scott	Cheri Eichen & Bill Steinkellner	October 21, 1984
The snobby socialite that beat Louise out of a Volunteer of the Year award is back and bragging about how her grandson is going to win a piano recital, leading Louise to enter her granddaughter, Jessica, in the recital with the intent of beating the snobby competition. Featuring Jaleel White.
232	3	"Bobbles, Bangles, and Booboos"	Oz Scott	Winston Moss	October 28, 1984
Louise and Florence have the perfect plan to get the best of George: they get the hidden-video show Bobbles, Bangles and Booboos to come over on the pretense of an interview with George. However, Louise and George develop suspicions about the show when the apartment is robbed.
233	4	"A House Divided"	Oz Scott	Ann Gibbs & Joel Kimmel	November 4, 1984
Louise is running for tenant council president, sure she's going to win, until she discovers someone is running against her: George. Note: Final appearance of Jack Fletcher as H.L. Whittendale.
234	5	"Some Enchanted Evening"	Arlando Smith	S : Billy Dee Williams & Marla Gibbs; T : Marcy Vosburgh & Sandy Sprung	November 18, 1984
George, Louise, Tom and Helen go to a charity ball where Florence's favorite soap star is scheduled to appear. When Florence is left behind because the event is sold out, she daydreams a Cinderella story about ending up with a Prince Charming. Guest stars: Hal Williams and Mabel King Note: Hal Williams and Marla Gibbs would portray husband and wife on 227 one year later.
235	6	"The Gift"	Oz Scott	Bobby Herbeck	November 25, 1984
Louise is excited that, for once, George has remembered her birthday after she sees him sneaking around with party favors. However, George, who overhears Helen and Louise, realizes that he has forgotten her birthday and scrambles to buy her a gift before it's too late.
236	7	"They Don't Make Preachers Like Him Anymore"	Oz Scott	S : Ron Leavitt; S/T : Michael G. Moye	December 16, 1984
Florence is excited because she and her church choir are going to Ohio for a competition, but she loses her faith in God when the Reverend steals the money for the entry fee.
237	8	"Try a Little Tenderness"	Oz Scott	Oz Scott & Joe Rosario	December 23, 1984
Kids break into George's store. When he catches them, he wants to call the police, but Louise wants to go a different way. Louise takes the thugs in and treats them to milk and brownies. After learning that one of the kids stole George's wallet, Louise is convinced that they are really thieves, but George reminds her that one of them did the right choice by giving the wallet back that and there's still hope.
238	9	"You'll Never Get Rich"	Oz Scott	Lewis Goldstein & Richard Kraut	January 8, 1985
Florence joins the Jeffersons on a trip to Atlantic City. Louise becomes so consumed with meeting a star, that she is oblivious to the actual celebrities she meets, while Florence allows a lucky gambling streak to get the better of her. Guest stars include Phyllis Diller, Charo, Engelbert Humperdinck, Helen Reddy, Joe Frazier, and Michael Spinks.
239	10	"The Unnatural"	Oz Scott	S : Andy Horowitz; T : Jerry Perzigian & Donald L. Seigel	January 15, 1985
George attends a Yankees game and is publicly embarrassed when he drops a home run hit by Reggie Jackson, a former Yankee now playing for the California Angels. Louise gets into the Angels' locker room and convinces Jackson to talk to George. Jackson's teammates Brian Downing and Mike Witt also appear in the episode as themselves. Note: Final appearance of Ned Wertimer as Ralph Hart (the doorman).
240	11	"Chairman of the Bored"	Oz Scott	Stu Goldman & Vito J. Giambalvo	January 22, 1985
When George, Louise and Helen are busy for an evening, an ignored Tom gets all the attention he could want from the sister of Mr. Bentley's girlfriend, leading Tom to daydream what it would be like to get all the attention all the time from five Playboy Playmates.
241	12	"Sayonara: Part 1"	Oz Scott	Peter Casey & David Lee	January 29, 1985
Lionel and Jenny return to New York after a trip to Japan, and they have a very important announcement to make upon their arrival. Louise, George, Tom and Helen assume that Jenny is pregnant again and set up a surprise party for them, only to find out much to their dismay that they've decided to get a divorce.
242	13	"Sayonara: Part 2"	Oz Scott	Cheri Eichen & Bill Steinkellner	February 5, 1985
After hearing the news of the divorce, George and Louise get into a fight with Tom and Helen that continues all the way through Family Night at Jessica's school. The constant bickering leads Jessica to run out of the school and onto the streets of New York. Note: Mike Evans and Berlinda Tolbert's final appearances as Lionel and Jenny Willis Jefferson.
243	14	"Last Dance"	Oz Scott	Cheri Eichen & Bill Steinkellner	February 12, 1985
George's assistant, Clark, doesn't have a date for the prom and Florence agrees to go with him. Once there, Florence runs into the man with whom she wanted to go to her prom, but he never asked her. Guest stars: Larry B. Scott and Stoney Jackson. Note: Stoney Jackson would later join the cast with Marla Gibbs on 227 four years later.
244	15	"The Gang's All Here"	Oz Scott	Al Aidekman	February 19, 1985
When Charlie goes out of town for the weekend, Louise agrees to be the bartender for a party he had previously booked. She quickly finds herself in over her head when the party is for a reunion of a biker gang.
245	16	"Hail to the Chief"	Oz Scott	Hans Kracauer	March 12, 1985
Tom is up for a promotion and is disappointed when it looks as if he's not going to get it. When he does get promoted, he finds the responsibility too overwhelming and considers resigning.
246	17	"A Secret in the Back Room"	Oz Scott	Jerry Perzigian & Donald L. Seigel	March 19, 1985
George and Louise's anniversary party comes to a screeching halt when they learn that Charlie, the bartender, has a drinking problem, which caused his separation from his wife.
247	18	"That Blasted Cunningham"	Oz Scott	S : Mark Zakarin; T : Peter Casey & David Lee	April 2, 1985
George is in yet another advertising war with Cunningham Cleaners, and each has vowed to out-promote the other. The festivities go too far, leading to Cunningham's death and leaving George to deal with his vengeful widow. Susan Ruttan, later of L.A. Law fame, guest stars as the vindictive Mrs. Cunningham.
248	19	"State of Mind"	Oz Scott	Cheri Eichen & Bill Steinkellner	April 23, 1985
Louise is up in arms over the young new tenant who has just moved into the building. The woman's constant partying prompts Louise to call a tenants meeting that ends with Louise discovering a little bit about age when the tenants accuse her of turning into an "old fuddy-duddy".
249	20	"And Up We Go"	Oz Scott	S : Warren S. Murray; T : Cheri Eichen & Bill Steinkellner	April 30, 1985
When Louise and Helen go to a spa for the weekend, they leave behind two bored husbands. To pass the time, George and Tom decide to break a record, and the record they choose is how many times they can go up and down on the elevator.
250	21	"The Truth Hurts"	Paul Benedict	S : Stephen Neigher; T : Sara V. Finney & Vida Spears	June 4, 1985
Louise is excited about the completion of her painting in art class, but everyone who sees her painting lies about how they really feel, leading Louise to believe she has created a masterpiece, and she decides to put on an art show. Note: Final Appearance of Danny Wells as Charlie the Bartender.
251	22	"The Odd Couple"	Michael G. Moye	Peter Casey & David Lee	June 11, 1985
Florence is tired of being alone and decides to place an ad in a personals column. The one response she gets is from someone she least expects: Harry Bentley.: Recording date: June 26, 1984
252	23	"Off-Off-Off-Off Broadway"	Oz Scott	Matt Robinson	June 25, 1985
Louise and Helen need quick cash to save their Disabled Youth Services program at the Help Center. To raise money, they decide to put on a talent show, while George thinks it'll be a great way to promote his business. Note: This episode was intended to be the season finale. But when network executives could not find a time slot for the 1985–86 Season, they immediately aired "Red Robins".
253	24	"Red Robins"	Oz Scott	Peter Casey, David Lee, Cheri Eichen & Bill Steinkellner	July 2, 1985
George vies to win the Dry Cleaner of the Year award, but finds he's short on the community service portion, leading him to take over as "nest mother" of Jessica's Red Robin troop, and he gives the girls irresponsible tips on how to sell their terrible tasting candy. Note: This episode was supposed to be the season 12 first episode.

== Sources ==
- "The Jeffersons Episodes". TV Guide. Archived from the original on August 15, 2012.
