= Where's Huddles? =

American animated sitcom

- Genre: Sports; Sitcom
- Voices of: Cliff Norton; Mel Blanc; Jean Vander Pyl; Marie Wilson; Paul Lynde; Alan Reed; Herb Jeffries; Dick Enberg; Don Messick
- Composer: Hoyt Curtin
- Country of origin: United States
- No. of seasons: 1
- No. of episodes: 10

Production
- Executive producers: William Hanna; Joseph Barbera
- Production company: Hanna-Barbera Productions

Original release
- Network: CBS
- Release: July 1 – September 2, 1970

Where's Huddles? is an American animated sitcom produced by Hanna-Barbera Productions that premiered on CBS on July 1, 1970. It ran for ten episodes as a summer replacement show for Hee Haw, until September 2.

It was similar in style to the studio's considerably more successful The Flintstones, and used several of the same essential voice actors and plots. Also, like The Flintstones, Where's Huddles? aired in the evening during prime time, had a laugh track, and had somewhat adult themes. All ten episodes were produced and directed by William Hanna and Joseph Barbera.

The summer replacement was intended be a trial run for a full prime-time series, but only lasted for ten episodes. The episodes were repeated on the network's Sunday afternoon schedule in the summer of 1971.

The show's premise involved a professional football quarterback named Ed Huddles (voiced by Cliff Norton) and his neighbor, the team's center Bubba McCoy (voiced by Mel Blanc).

== Cast ==
- Cliff Norton as Ed Huddles
- Mel Blanc as Bubba McCoy
- Paul Lynde as Claude Pertwee
- Herb Jeffries as Freight Train
- Alan Reed as Mad Dog Maloney
- Jean Vander Pyl as Marge Huddles
- Marie Wilson as Penny McCoy
- Don Messick as Fumbles
- Dick Enberg as the Rhinos' announcer

== Episodes ==
=== Season 1 (1970) ===
| No. | Title | Written by | Storyboard by | Original release date |
|---|---|---|---|---|
| 1 | "The Old Swimming Hole" | Harvey Bullock and R. S. Allen | Iwao Takamoto | July 1, 1970 |
Things go terribly wrong when Pertwee and company try to install a swimming pool.
| 2 | "A Weighty Problem" | Harvey Bullock and R. S. Allen | Lewis Marshall | July 8, 1970 |
Bubba's overweight problem threatens to have him and Ed traded to a team in Alaska, so he goes on a crash diet program concocted by Ed. But neighbor Pertwee is ecstatic that the next-door "savages" may have to move and schemes to sabotage every diet effort made by the Huddles and McCoys.
| 3 | "The Ramblin' Wreck" | Harvey Bullock and R. S. Allen | Lewis Marshall | July 15, 1970 |
Pertwee's new acquisition, and love, is an antique European roadster. After he leaves on a business trip, it does not take long before Bubba and Ed accidentally turn it into a pile of parts. When Pertwee returns early, the boys enlist the help of Freight Train and the other Rhino players to rebuild the car and buy time by letting Pertwee think that it has been stolen.
| 4 | "The Offensives" | Barry Blitzer | Paul Sommer | July 22, 1970 |
When "Mad Dog" Madowski, a Chicago Bears linebacker, finds fame as a Tiny Tim-like singer, Ed, Bubba and Freight Train create their own trio, "The Offensives." With Pertwee as their agent at a 50% fee, the boys are booked into the hottest nightclub in town. Unfortunately, Coach Mad Dog (noticing Madowski's singing career has weakened his playing talent) has instituted a new "no moonlighting" policy for his players, suspending any violators from the team.
| 5 | "Hot Dog Hannah" | Art Baer and Ben Joelson | Bill Ackerman | July 29, 1970 |
Hot Dog Hannah, an elderly snack vendor at the football stadium, is actually rich from investing in real estate and hides her huge fortune in her mattress. But since she lives in a shack at the city dump, everyone, including Ed and Bubba, thinks that she is destitute. With good intentions, they fix up her shack and replace her mattress. Learning their mistake, the boys begin a scavenger hunt to find Hannah's fortune before she sues them.
| 6 | "To Catch a Thief" | Harvey Bullock and R. S. Allen | Lewis Marshall | August 5, 1970 |
Marge has scrimped and saved $100 to surprise Ed with a sports jacket that he wants. Ed accidentally finds the money, assumes that she has been holding out on the family finances and, in a huff, he takes the money and splurges on himself. Marge thinks that the money has been stolen and calls the police. Now that Ed knows the truth, he has to find a way to replace the money and keep Marge from knowing how he doubted her, all before amateur investigator Pertwee figures it out.
| 7 | "Get That Letter Back" | Larry Markes | Paul Sommer | August 12, 1970 |
Ed and Bubba invest the families' savings into a car wash and are so sure of financial success, they send an angry letter to Coach Mad Dog and resign from the Rhinos. They learn that a new highway project will reroute all traffic from their business and now the mad rush is on to retrieve their letter from the post before Coach receives it.
| 8 | "The Odd Trio" | Harvey Bullock and R. S. Allen | George Singer | August 19, 1970 |
A storm damages the neighborhood, and while Pertwee fights with his insurance company, Ed and Bubba set out to repair their own houses. Ed's ladder falls on Claude, and rather than continue dealing with his insurance man, he exaggerates his injuries and threatens a lawsuit, turning Ed and Bubba into his personal repairmen and servants. Because of Pertwee, the boys may have to miss Sunday's big game.
| 9 | "A Sticky Affair" | Art Baer and Ben Joelson | Paul Sommer | August 26, 1970 |
Rhino quarterback Ed has fallen into a fumbling slump, so Bubba cooks up an idea to put glue on his hands before the game. Not just any glue, but Bubba's homemade concoction. His invention turns into a superglue and, with Pertwee's help, they are in a get-rich-quick scheme to put it on the market. Bubba cannot remember his recipe and when the boys look for their last remaining batch to be analyzed, they discover that it has been picked up with the trash.
| 10 | "One Man's Family" | Harvey Bullock and R. S. Allen | Lewis Marshall | September 2, 1970 |
As a favor, Ed goes to Bubba's doctor to pick up his buddy's test results. Overhearing the doctor, Ed thinks that Bubba is pregnant! Pampering his best friend, Huddles soon has the entire team coddling Bubba, even during Sunday's game.

== Home media ==
The series was released on DVD on July 26, 2016.

== Comic book ==
Gold Key Comics published a three-issue comic book series based on Where's Huddles? from January 1971 to December 1971.
