= Glitter (American TV series) =

American television series

- Genre: Drama
- Created by: Art Baer; Ben Joelson; Nancy Sackett
- Starring: David Birney; Morgan Brittany; Melinda Culea; Arthur Hill; Dianne Kay; Tracy Nelson; Timothy Patrick Murphy; Christopher Mayer; Arte Johnson; Barbara Sharma
- Theme music composer: Lalo Schifrin
- Composers: Lalo Schifrin; David Kurtz; Ben Lanzarone; Dennis McCarthy; Peter T. Meyers; Duane Tatro
- Country of origin: United States
- Original language: English
- No. of seasons: 1
- No. of episodes: 14

Production
- Executive producers: Aaron Spelling; Douglas S. Cramer
- Production locations: Los Angeles, California, United States
- Running time: 60 minutes
- Production company: Aaron Spelling Productions

Original release
- Network: ABC
- Release: September 13, 1984 – December 27, 1985

Glitter is an American drama television series that originally on ABC. Glitter premiered on September 13, 1984 and ended on December 27, 1985, with a total of 14 episodes over the course of 1 season.

The series was produced by Aaron Spelling The series was set behind the scenes of a top entertainment magazine titled Glitter and attempted to combine the urgency of journalism and business politics with the glamorous lifestyles of the rich and famous featured in the pages of the magazine. The leading cast members were David Birney, Morgan Brittany, Christopher Mayer, Dianne Kay and Arthur Hill.

The format of the series was similar to two other popular ABC shows, which were also produced by Aaron Spelling; The Love Boat and Hotel, in that each week it featured high-profile guest appearances from famous celebrities, including Ginger Rogers and Cyd Charisse. Unlike the other shows, Glitter was not a ratings success. It was scheduled on Thursday nights against Simon & Simon, Cheers and Night Court, which were all among the top-20 most-watched programs at that time. The first three episodes aired in September 1984, and then the show was taken off the air (though was still in production) until December 1984, when three more episodes were shown. Ratings did not improve and the series was cancelled. The remaining eight episodes were burned off during December 1985 as part of ABC's late-night line-up.

Despite its lack of success in the US, Glitter was sold internationally. It was shown in the UK on BBC1 in the summer of 1985 (though not all episodes were shown).

== Cast ==
- David Birney as Sam Dillon
- Morgan Brittany as Kate Simpson
- Dianne Kay as Jennifer Douglas
- Dorian Harewood as Earl Tobin
- Christopher Mayer as Pete Bozak
- Melinda Culea as Terry Randolph
- Timothy Patrick Murphy as Chip Craddock
- Tracy Nelson as Angela Timini
- Arte Johnson as Clive Richlin
- Barbara Sharma as Shelley Sealy
- Arthur Hill as Charles Hardwick

== Episodes ==
No.	Title	Directed by	Written by	Original release date	Prod. code
1	"Pilot"	Jackie Cooper	Nancy Sackett & Art Baer & Ben Joelson	September 13, 1984	000
2	"Trouble in Paradise"	Robert Scheerer	Rick Mittleman	September 20, 1984	005
3	"In Tennis, Love Means Nothing"	Gabrielle Beaumont	Sari Benson	September 27, 1984	004
4	"On Your Toes"	Alan Rafkin	Duane Poole & Tom Swale	December 11, 1984	001
5	"A Minor Miracle"	Curtis Harrington	Duane Poole & Tom Swale	December 18, 1984	009
6	"Illusions"	Bruce Bilson	Anne Collins	December 25, 1984	012
7	"The Tribute"	Alan Rafkin	Lan O'Kun	December 13, 1985	003
8	"The Covergirl"	Allen Reisner	Del Reisman	December 17, 1985	007
9	"Nightfall"	Bob Sweeney	Duane Poole & Tom Swale	December 18, 1985	013
10	"The Matriarch"	John Patterson	Story by : Larry Forrester; Teleplay by : Jeff Stuart	December 19, 1985	011
11	"Fathers and Children"	Gabrielle Beaumont	Story by : Gary Kott & Rudolph Borchert; Teleplay by : Rudolph Borchert & Tom Sawyer	December 20, 1985	010
12	"Rock 'n Roll Heaven"	Kim Friedman	Donald Ross	December 25, 1985	002
13	"The Runaway"	Russ Mayberry	Robert Van Scoyk	December 26, 1985	008
14	"Suddenly Innocent"	Richard A. Wells	Rudolph Borchert	December 27, 1985	006
