= Barbara Sharma =

American actress and dancer

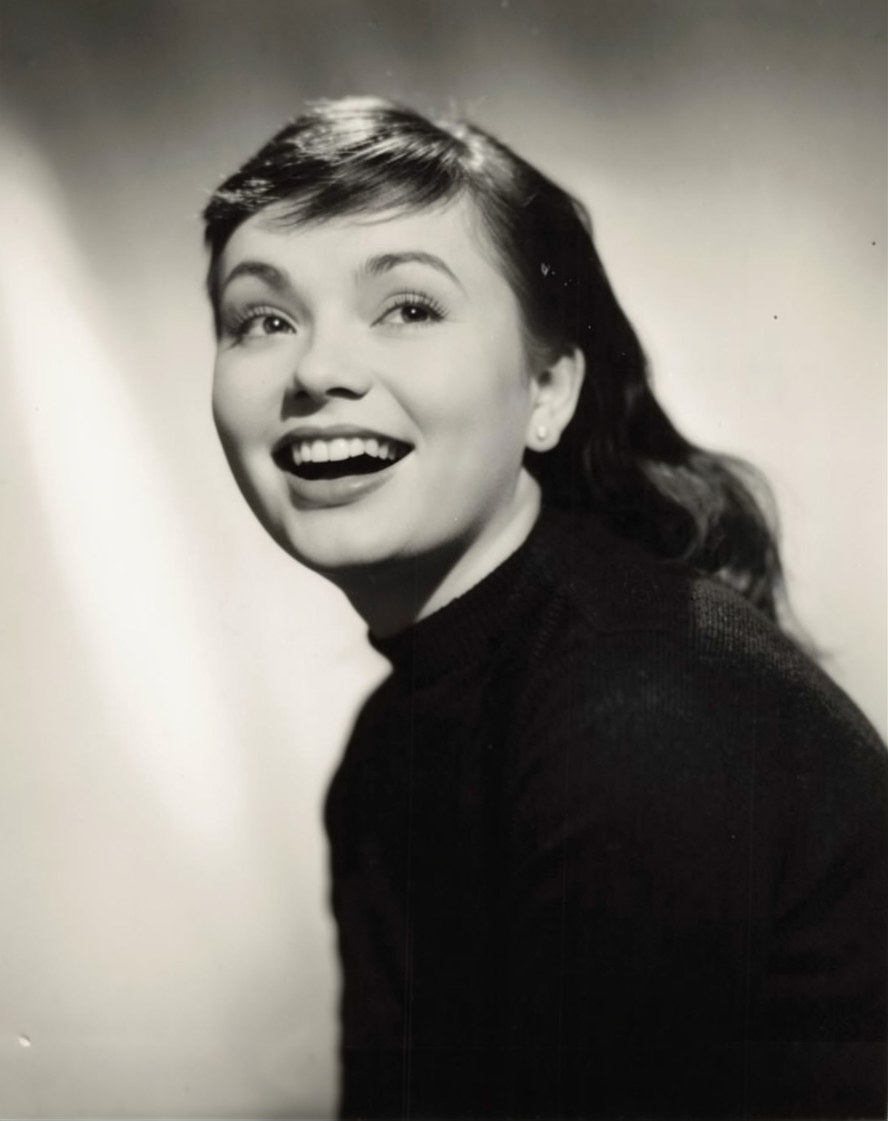
- Sharma in 1959
- Born: Barbara Anna Sharma Schirmer; September 14, 1938 (age 87); Dallas, Texas, U.S.
- Occupations: Actress, dancer
- Years active: 1950s–2000s
- Spouse: Al Stewart (m. 1958; div. 1968)
- Children: 1

Barbara Sharma (born Barbara Anna Sharma Schirmer; September 14, 1938) is an American actress and dancer of the night clubs, stage, television, and film. She began dancing at age 4 and professionally at age 9, dancing in nightclubs in Miami, Florida and Havana, Cuba. She worked closely with Bob Fosse as a lead dancer in his company for five seasons.

She created roles in original Broadway productions during the 1960s, including Rosie in Sweet Charity and Mary in Hallelujah, Baby!, and as a regular performer on Rowan & Martin's Laugh-In from 1970 to 1972, in which she often tap-danced and played, among many other roles, the "Burbank Metre Maid". She played Shelley Sealy as a main cast member of the short lived TV series Glitter (1984–85), and performed the recurring roles of Mrs. Recinos on Becker, Mrs. Douglas on Frasier, Amanda Wilkerson on Chico and the Man, and Myrna Morgenstein in Rhoda. She appeared in commercials from the 1950s to the 2000s, including commercials for Folgers, Glass Plus, and State Farm.

== Early years ==
Barbara Anna Sharma Schirmer was born on September 14, 1938, in Dallas, Texas. Her father, Edwin Schirmer, was a haberdashery salesman.

20th Century Fox wanted her to debut in films when she was 8 years old, but her father ended negotiations because he did not want the family to live in California. She developed an interest in radio when she was growing up because her father would not have a television in the house. At age 14 she moved to New York to live with relatives and attended the Professional Children's School.

== Career ==
Sharma's acting career began when she was 4 years old. She was billed as Barbara Ann Sharma, but later she was advised to drop the middle name. She described herself as "a ballerina, a child prodigy, a big name in Cuba when I was 10 years old". She began her dancing career at the age of 9 in Miami and Havana, Cuba, and nightclubs across the states. Her hoofing came well before her tap-dancing.

She began her Off-Broadway career at the age of 19 starring in the lead role of Little Mary Sunshine and in the original production of Rick Besoyan's In Your Hat in 1957 after spending a summer performing at Camp Tamiment. She initially came to prominence on the Broadway stage in the 1960s in the original casts of Little Me, Hello, Dolly!, Sweet Charity (as Rosie), Hallelujah, Baby! (as Mary), and Come Summer (as Emma Faucett). Much of her work can be heard on the original cast albums for those shows. She later appeared on Broadway as Bobbi Michele in Last of the Red Hot Lovers in 1970.

In 1970, Sharma replaced Bernadette Peters in the New York production of Dames at Sea and continued with the show for its entire run in Los Angeles. Her performance in the show drew the attention of producer George Schlatter and led to her big break in television; landing her a part in the main cast of Rowan & Martin's Laugh-In from 1970 to 1972. She portrayed Shelley Sealy on Glitter and was a member of the cast of the PBS anthology series Masquerade. In 1982, she played Adelaide in Garland Wright's production of Guys and Dolls at the Guthrie Theater.

Sharma's other TV appearances include the recurring roles of Mrs. Recinos in Becker, Mrs. Douglas in Frasier, Amanda Wilkerson in Chico and the Man, and Myrna Morgenstein in Rhoda in addition to guest appearances on Alice, Amazing Stories, Hart to Hart, Insight, Muddling Through, One Day at a Time, Perfect Strangers, Shadow Chasers, Tabitha, The David Frost Show, The Mike Douglas Show, The Facts of Life, The Mary Tyler Moore Show, and two episodes of The Tonight Show Starring Johnny Carson. She was a recurring panelist on the game show Match Game during the 1970s, and in 1973, she starred opposite Bernadette Peters in the ABC musical comedy special Break Up. In 1984, she portrayed Shelley Sealy as a main cast member of the short-lived TV series Glitter. Film credits include Con Air, My Stepmother Is an Alien, Norman... Is That You?, and Time Share.

Sharma did "a lot of radio work" and made dozens of commercials.

== Personal life ==
Sharma married trumpet player Al Stewart when she was 17 years old, and they have a daughter.
