= Jack Collins (actor) =

American actor (1918–2005)

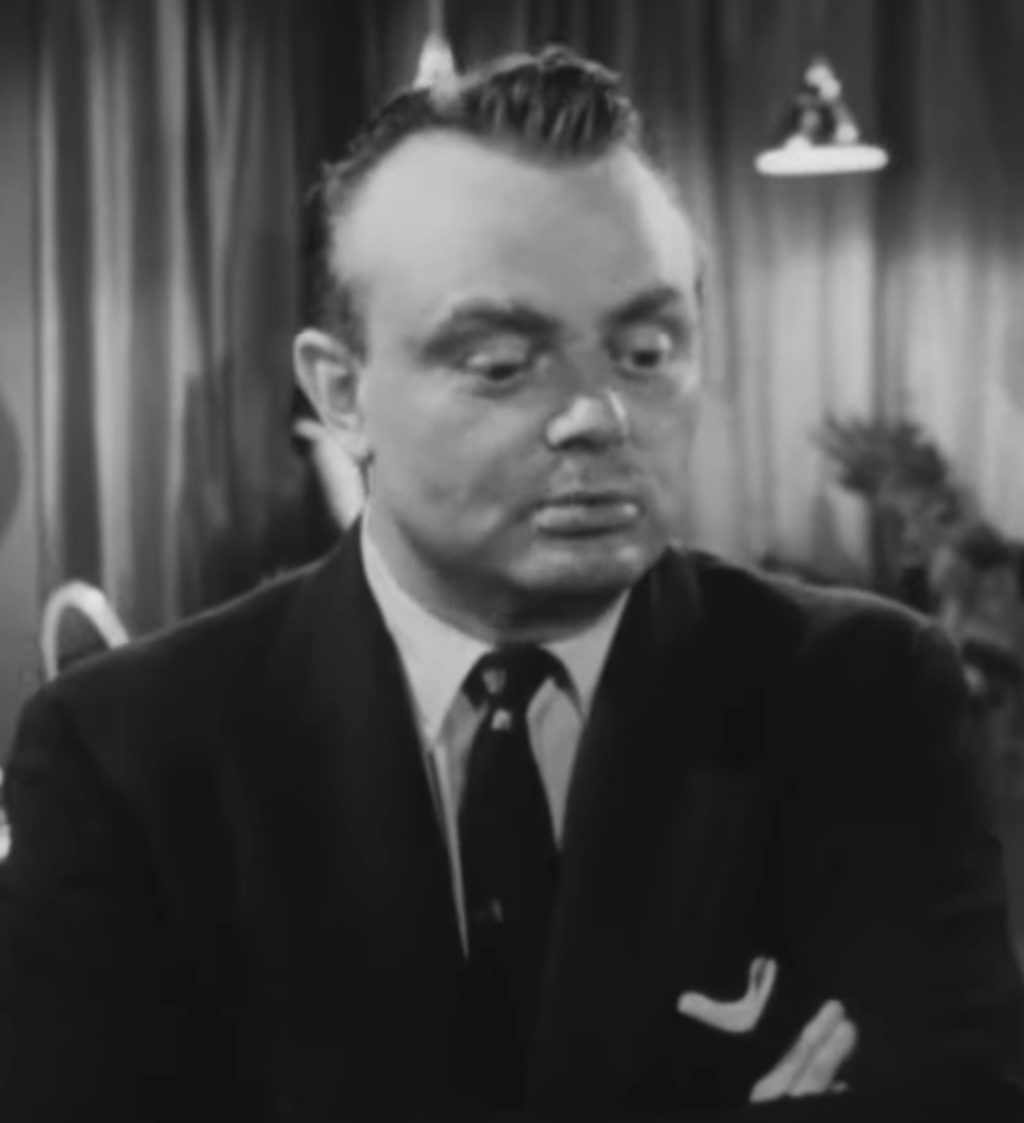
- Collins in Rock, Rock, Rock (1956)
- Born: Jack Richard Collins; August 24, 1918; Brooklyn, New York, U.S.
- Died: January 31, 2005 (aged 86); Los Angeles, California, U.S.
- Occupation: Actor
- Years active: 1956–1988

Jack Richard Collins (August 24, 1918 – January 31, 2005) was an American film, stage and television actor. He was best known for playing the recurring role of Mike Brady's boss, Mr. Phillips, in the television series The Brady Bunch, and Peter Christopher's boss, baby-food manufacturer Max Brahms, in the short-lived sitcom television series Occasional Wife. Collins also played San Francisco Mayor Robert Ramsay in Irwin Allen's film The Towering Inferno (1974).

Collins appeared in television programs, the latter including The Phil Silvers Show, Gunsmoke, Bonanza, Mission: Impossible, The Addams Family, My Favorite Martian, Bewitched, I Dream of Jeannie, The Lucy Show, Petticoat Junction, The Odd Couple, Adam-12, The Mod Squad, Ironside, The Partridge Family, The Waltons, Chico and the Man, Cannon, The Rockford Files, CHiPs, Matt Houston and Dallas.

Collins died on January 31, 2005, in Los Angeles, California, at the age of 86.

== TV and filmography ==
- Rock, Rock, Rock (1956) – Father
- Bewitched (1965–1972, TV Series) – Mr. Robbins / Jamieson / Mr. Prescott / Joseph Hinkley Sr. / Mr. Harper / Jack Rogers
- I Dream of Jeannie (1965, TV Series) – General Hadley
- The Addams Family (1966, TV Series) – Dr. Bird
- My Favorite Martian (1966, TV Series) – Sam
- Petticoat Junction (1966, TV Series) – Hubert Thatcher
- The Lucy Show (1968, TV Series) – Ernie Williams / Rocky
- Adam-12 (1968, TV Series) – Mr. Purdy
- Ironside (1968, TV Series) – Corning
- Bonanza (1969–1972, TV Series) – Mayor Harlow / Mayor / Mayor Ned Blaine / Mayor Corey / Banker
- The Brady Bunch (1970–1971, TV Series) – Mr. Phillips
- The Partridge Family (1970–1974, TV Series) – Mayor Towbin / M. C. / Investor
- The Mod Squad (1971, TV Series) – Andy Staton
- Gunsmoke (1971, TV Series) – J. Stedman Edgecomb
- The Jimmy Stewart Show (1972, TV series) – "Bronco" Lewis
- The Waltons (1972, TV Series) – Colonel Tecumseh Henderson
- The Odd Couple (1972–1974, TV Series) – Albert (Zebra) / Brother Samuel
- The Other (1972) – Mr. P.C. Pretty
- Get to Know Your Rabbit (1972) – Mr. Reese
- Here's Lucy (1973) - one episode, "Tipsy through the Tulips"
- Mission: Impossible (1973, TV Series) – Admiral
- Emperor of the North Pole (1973) – Dispatcher (uncredited)
- The Sting (1973) – Duke Boudreau
- Break Up (1973) – Himself
- The Towering Inferno (1974) – Mayor Ramsay
- Death Sentence (1974) – Willis Wright
- Linda Lovelace for President (1975) – John "Honest John"
- Chico and the Man (1975, TV Series) – Customer
- Cannon (1975, TV Series) – Mr. Olsen / Edinger
- Flood! (1976, TV Movie) – Jack Spangler
- The Trial of Lee Harvey Oswald (1977, TV Movie) – Judge Claymore
- Pete's Dragon (1977) – Fisherman #3
- The Rockford Files (1977–1979, TV Series) – Dr. Wetherford / Victor Kreski / Frank Martin / Finn O'Herlihy
- Goin' Coconuts (1978) – Charlie
- CHiPs (1979–1981, TV Series) – Store Manager / Lem Dover
- Dallas (1982–1987, TV Series) – Russell Slater
- Jekyll and Hyde... Together Again (1982) – Baron Von Horsch
- Matt Houston (1984, TV Series) – Priest
- The Nest (1988) – Jake "Shakey Jake" (final film role)
