= Break Up (TV program) =

Musical comedy special

Break Up is a musical comedy special which aired on ABC in 1973. Directed by Jerry Paris and produced by Charles W. Fries and Alan Sacks, the cast included Carl Ballantine, Jack Collins, Bruce Davison, Anthony Holland, Bernadette Peters, Billy Sands, and Barbara Sharma. The special consisted of three sketches which were written by Dee Caruso, Gerald Gardner, and Don Van Atta. The show ended with the entire cast singing "Together (Wherever We Go)" from the 1959 musical Gypsy with music by Jule Styne and lyrics by Stephen Sondheim.

== Sketches ==
- "Dressing Room Interruptions" The performing Hertz Brothers receive terrible news just before the show begins.
- "Mr. Acropolis" A group of theater performers uses crazy devices to earn the sympathy of a jaded theater owner.
- "Ginsberg" A Charlie Chan with a Yiddish accent rescues a damsel in distress as comedy ensues.
