= The First Store =

- The Jeffersons episode
- Episode no.: Season 6 Episode 134
- Directed by: Bob Lally
- Written by: Jay Moriarty; Mike Milligan
- Production code: 621
- Original air date: April 6, 1980

Episode chronology
| ← Previous "Louise Takes a Stand" | Next → "Once Upon a Time" |

"The First Store" is a flashback episode from the sitcom The Jeffersons, and was first broadcast on April 6, 1980 on CBS. Written by Jay Moriarty & Mike Milligan and directed by Bob Lally, it is the penultimate episode of the sixth season, and the 134th episode of the series.

The episode was produced in remembrance of the assassination of Martin Luther King Jr., which occurred 12 years earlier on April 4, 1968.

== Plot summary ==
While looking through a series of old photographs, Louise (Isabel Sanford) and George (Sherman Hemsley) recall the opening of the first Jefferson Cleaners store in Harlem. On April 4, 1968, George prepares to sign the final papers to obtain a loan allowing him to open the store, which he plans to call "Handy Dandy Cleaners" (rejecting Louise's suggestion to use the name "Jefferson Cleaners" instead). Meanwhile, Lionel (who is approximately eighteen years old) is becoming increasingly militant, and Louise and George worry that his future is headed in the wrong direction.

While inspecting the space that George has rented for the store, the three of them notice that civil unrest has broken out in the streets. One of the rioters informs them that Martin Luther King Jr. has just been assassinated. The family is stunned, and an infuriated George hurls a chair through his own storefront window, screaming "You bastards!!" The next day, the loan officer from the bank (Roger Bowen) arrives at the Jeffersons' apartment with the final paperwork for the loan. However, the man shows little empathy for the grief accompanying Dr. King's death, and George throws him out after he refers to the people in the neighborhood as "animals". A frustrated Lionel (Mike Evans) starts to head outside to join the rioters, but George and Louise convince him to stay, reminding him that Dr. King would not approve.

The episode ends with Louise, George and Lionel listening to a news report on the radio. An excerpt from Dr. King's last speech, "I've Been to the Mountaintop", is being played, as the three family members struggle to hold back their tears.

=== Conflicting timeline ===
Based on events established in the characters' history during the All in the Family episode "My Aching Back" (first airing in 1971, three years after King's assassination), the first Jefferson Cleaners did not open until then, when it was stated that they had just opened their first store. The first store was said to have been funded with money George had been awarded in a $5000 settlement from the city, following an accident with a bus.

== Reception ==
Following the death of producer Norman Lear, The Hollywood Reporter listed "The First Store" as one of the "Six Norman Lear Episodes That Changed the World".
