= Art Baer =

American producer and screenwriter

- Born: September 17, 1925; Washington Heights, New York, U.S.
- Died: September 17, 2006 (aged 81); Los Angeles, California, U.S.
- Education: New York University
- Occupations: Producer, screenwriter

Art Baer (September 17, 1925 – September 17, 2006) was an American producer and screenwriter. He is known for producing and writing for the American romantic comedy drama The Love Boat, with his partner, Ben Joelson.

== Life and career ==
Baer was born in the Washington Heights neighborhood of Manhattan, New York City. He attended New York University.

Baer began his career as a writer for the radio program The Robert Q. Lewis Show during which he met his partner, Ben Joelson.

With Joelson, he produced and wrote for television programs including The Odd Couple, The Andy Griffith Show and its spin-off Gomer Pyle, U.S.M.C., The Jeffersons, Good Times, The Partridge Family, Chico and the Man, Happy Days, The Carol Burnett Show, Get Smart, The Dick Van Dyke Show and Car 54, Where Are You?.

In 1972, Baer won an Primetime Emmy for Outstanding Writing Achievement in Variety or Music. He retired his career, in 1997, last writing for the television series Wings on the episode, titled, "Hosed".

Baer died in September 2006 of cancer, on his 81st birthday in Los Angeles, California.
