= Ben Joelson =

American producer and screenwriter

- Born: Benjamin Aaron Joelson; November 1, 1925; Paterson, New Jersey, U.S.
- Died: August 24, 1996 (aged 70); Los Angeles, California, U.S.
- Occupation(s): Producer, screenwriter
- Spouse: Rhoda Joelson
- Children: 2

Benjamin Aaron Joelson (November 1, 1925 - August 24, 1996) was an American producer and screenwriter. He is known for producing and writing for the American romantic comedy drama The Love Boat, with his partner, Art Baer.

Joelson has also worked as a writer/producer on other television programs, as his credits includes, Wings, Car 54, Where Are You?, The Andy Griffith Show (and its spin-off Gomer Pyle, U.S.M.C.), Hogan's Heroes, The Carol Burnett Show, The Jeffersons, The Partridge Family, Good Times, The Odd Couple, Get Smart and Happy Days. In 1972, he won an Primetime Emmy for Outstanding Writing Achievement in Variety or Music.

Joelson died in August 1996 from complications of a lung disease at the Cedars-Sinai Hospital in Los Angeles, California, at the age of 70.
