= List of McHale's Navy episodes =

McHale's Navy is an American sitcom starring Ernest Borgnine that aired 138 half-hour episodes over four seasons, from October 11, 1962, to April 12, 1966, on the ABC television network. The series was filmed in black and white.

== Series overview ==
Season	Episodes	Originally released	
Season	Episodes	First released	Last released
1	36	October 11, 1962	June 27, 1963
2	36	September 17, 1963	May 19, 1964
3	36	September 15, 1964	June 1, 1965
4	30	September 14, 1965	April 12, 1966

== Episodes ==
=== Season 1 (1962–63) ===
No. overall	No. in season	Title	Directed by	Written by	Original release date
1	1	"An Ensign for McHale"	Edward J. Montagne	Gene L. Coon	October 11, 1962
Captain Binghamton (Joe Flynn) asks Commander McHale (Ernest Borgnine) why he has gone through four Ensigns in the last two months. Ensign Charles Parker (Tim Conway) reports to Binghamton. Binghamton tells him about McHale and his crew of "pirates". He then sees that Parker's record is less than stellar. Binghamton assigns Parker to the PT 73 crew as Executive Officer. He gives Parker one week to get McHale and his men into proper navy form or he will be transferred to the worst assignment in the Navy. Because Binghamton does not want McHale's men on the base, they have their own island. Parker finds the crew undisciplined. McHale explains to Parker about their POW friend, Fuji Kobiaji (Yoshio Yoda). Though Parker is unwelcome at first, McHale sees potential in him. McHale learns that Binghamton will inspect the crew to see how Parker has done. He orders his crew to act Navy so Parker will not be shipped out. During the inspection, Binghamton sees Fuji. McHale says Fuji is a local native. The men pass the inspection and Parker won't be shipped out. Carl Ballantine as Lester Gruber. Gary Vinson as George Christopher. Billy Sands as Harrison 'Tinker' Bell. Edson Stroll as Virgil Edwards. Gavin MacLeod as Happy. John Wright as Willy Moss. Note: Bob Hastings, Lt. Elroy Carpenter, does not appear in this episode.
2	2	"A Purple Heart for Gruber"	Sidney Lanfield	Danny Arnold	October 18, 1962
Gruber drops off some laundry that Binghamton had him do. Binghamton tells McHale that an enemy sub has established a base in the area. He wants McHale to find it. While on a training missing, Gruber and the men do laundry in the ocean. The Japanese sub spots them and fires a torpedo. The torpedo hits the tub with the laundry that the PT 73 is dragging. Gruber has a small cut on his finger. Gruber wants McHale to send in a citation for a Purple Heart. McHale becomes upset when he learns that Parker already sent in the citation. A misunderstanding leads Binghamton to believe that McHale's men sunk the sub. Now the crew has to search for the sub before Binghamton discovers it is still there. They spot the sub and it fires a torpedo. The men cannot start the PT 73's engine, but the torpedo misses them. Later, they manage to sink the sub. Dale Ishimoto as Japanese Commander.
3	3	"McHale and His Seven Cupids"	Sidney Lanfield	Larry Markes & Michael Morris	October 25, 1962
The men are receiving their shots from a new, attractive nurse, Lt. Casey Brown (Betsy Jones-Moreland). Parker is infatuated with Casey. McHale helps Parker invite Casey to their base for dinner. That night at dinner, McHale's attempt to make Parker seem taller fail. Parker becomes intoxicated by peaches soaked in alcohol. McHale plots a scheme where they try to make Parker have the symptoms of 'battle fatigue' so that he can be close to the nurse. Casey begins treating Parker. McHale has the men make love letters that will make Parker look as though many women are interested in him. Parker then believes that McHale is in love with Casey. Then he discovers that Casey is already married. Later, Parker is assigned two weeks of rest in Sydney, Australia. Now some of the other men pretend to have 'battle fatigue' so they are sent away. Note: Joe Flynn (Captain Binghamton) and Bob Hastings (Carpenter) do not appear in this episode, despite both being credited.
4	4	"PT 73, Where Are You?"	Edward J. Montagne	Joseph Heller	November 1, 1962
Binghamton tells McHale that Admiral Reynolds is rewarding him for finding a Japanese sub by sending him to New Caledonia for a break. McHale learns that Virgil, PT 73 Gunner's Mate, lost the 73 while taking a nightly ride to charm an island girl. He parked the boat and went for a walk in the jungle with the girl. Because it was dark, he could not return to the boat and they walked to the village. McHale sends Virgil and Tinker to search for the boat. Binghamton finds out and is ready to have McHale in front of a court martial. Parker tells McHale he may even have to pay for the boat. The crew arranges for a replacement so they can take the week's R&R trip to New Caledonia. Binghamton becomes suspicious when McHale says they found the 73. He cancels their trip and lets Carpenter's boat go instead. Carpenter tells Binghamton that his boat is missing. Things become complicated when Virgil returns with the 73. Carpenter's PT 116 is found, but when he and Binghamton inspect it, there are many things on it that should not be, because it is really the 73. McHale and the men take Carpenter's boat to New Caledonia.
5	5	"Movies Are Your Best Diversion"	Edward J. Montagne	Larry Markes & Michael Morris	November 8, 1962
The 73 crew find a way to have a late night party with some of the nurses. Binghamton is not happy about it and let's McHale know. McHale tells the men they are going to an island that the Japanese have occupied. They are going just to observe. Before departing, McHale and Gruber manage to take some war movies that were meant for Binghamton from the Supply Lieutenant. On the island, McHale visits with an old friend, Chief Maku-Maku (Leon Lontoc). McHale learns that there are around 130 Japanese on the other side of the island. Binghamton and Carpenter discuss how the Supply Convoy has been delayed and are near the island. McHale and the men hope to avert an attack on the convoy, by employing a clever plan involving John Wayne, Humphrey Bogart, and Errol Flynn. McHale accomplishes this by splicing the war movies, that they stole from Binghamton, together and placing large speakers on the island. Now the Japanese will hear all the bombing and think a landing is taking place. There are some problems, but the convoy does make it safely past the island. John Fujioka as The Japanese Aide. Mako as The Japanese Sentry.
6	6	"Operation Wedding Party"	Edward J. Montagne	Marty Roth	November 15, 1962
Christy, PT-73 Quartermaster, and his fiancée, Lieutenant Gloria Winters (Cindy Robbins), tell McHale that she is being returned to the states. They want to ask Binghamton if they can marry. McHale knows Binghamton will not allow it. McHale schemes to sneak Christy and Gloria over to Father Nelson. Nelson has a mission about 100 miles away. McHale tells Christy that no one else can know about it. But the crew hear about it. Gruber makes wedding plans. McHale learns of it and reluctantly agrees to a wedding party with the crew. The party expands when Gloria's fellow nurses want to join. Happy and Virgil tease Tinker when Nurse Molly Turner (Jane Dulo) has him modeling the wedding dress. Everyone has to hide things as Binghamton approaches. McHale creates a viable excuse when Binghamton finds Tinker in the dress. Binghamton tells the men that he is sending them on some exercises that night, which is when the wedding was to be. Molly has a way for Binghamton to cancel the exercises. There are some Japanese on Father Nelson's island, but they are frightened away. Christy and Gloria are married. Don Matheson as Lt. Harris. Note: Bob Hastings (Carpenter) does not appear in this episode.
7	7	"Who Do the Voodoo?"	Edward J. Montagne	Gene L. Coon	November 22, 1962
Chief Pali Urulu (Jacques Aubuchon) comes to see McHale. Urulu says that the Navy's "cannon boats" destroyed his coconut trees and he wants $100,000. McHale sends him to Binghamton. When Binghamton refuses to give him anything, Urulu puts a curse on him. Binghamton thinks it is all funny until he has bad luck at every turn. On the island, Gruber is doing magic tricks for the men. Tinker tells them that bad things are happening to Binghamton. Binghamton decides to file a claim for Urulu. Gruber tells the men that Adm. Hawkins (Willis Bouchey) is coming to replace Binghamton. McHale knows they will be worse off with Hawkins. McHale wants Gruber to pretend to be a local witch doctor and make Binghamton believe that he can remove the curse. Gruber performs a ritual to a reluctant Binghamton. Meanwhile, Hawkins arrives and takes Carpenter to go look for Binghamton. Gruber is still performing his ritual when Urulu arrives. Gruber does a magic trick to prove to Urulu that he is a witch doctor. Urulu removes the curse on Binghamton. Hawkins arrives and a Urulu puts a curse on him. McHale finds a way to have Binghamton keep his command.
8	8	"Three Girls on an Island"	Sidney Lanfield	Si Rose & Fred Finklehoffe	November 29, 1962
McHale and the crew rescue a pilot that had to parachute into the ocean. The pilot is surprised when there is also a bunch of native women on the ship having a luau. Binghamton tells Carpenter that the Tyler Sisters will arrive to entertain Admiral Reynolds (Herbert Lytton). They are a three-sister singing act, Lil, Rita and Peggy (Marian Collier). Gruber and the men want to have a luau for the sisters and steal some of the food that Binghamton had planned for his dinner party. Binghamton confines the men to their island and he finds some of the stolen items. Just then Carpenter tells him that the sister's plane had engine trouble and had to land on a deserted island. Carpenter also says that the Admiral wanted McHale's men to find them. The men find the women and flirt with them. Gruber tells McHale that they have some engine trouble and Tinker will have to fix it. But the girls, having had such experiences in the past, are wise to their plan. The girls refuse to play along and insist the men fix things immediately. Binghamton and Carpenter go to the island searching for the girls, but everyone is gone already. By the time they return, the girls have already performed for the Admiral. The girls just want to return to New Caledonia. The girls cannot believe it when Reynolds' pilot says the plane is having some engine trouble.
9	9	"McHale's Paradise Motel"	Sidney Lanfield	Walter Kempley	December 6, 1962
Nurse Molly complains to McHale how there is nothing to do on this island. McHale asks Binghamton if his men could have some time off. Binghamton instead sends the 73 on a recon mission to Takajema, a deserted island. They find an empty plantation home there. The house is furnished and has a piano and a phonograph. They decide to keep it a secret from Binghamton and make it a party house. They invite the nurses and even serve alcohol. The Admiral calls Binghamton, and tells him air reconnaissance has noticed strange things happening at Takajema. Binghamton wants McHale to take him there. The Japanese want to inspect the island as well. McHale tries to alert the men and women when they approach the island. When Binghamton and McHale arrive at the party house, the nurses have made it look like a base hospital. Binghamton does not fall for it and tells McHale he is looking at a court martial. The Japanese fire on the island. The Japanese boat is captured. McHale dodges a court martial and Binghamton receives a commendation. Barbara Lyon as 1st Nurse. Rollin Moriyama as Japanese Officer. Note: This is the last episode to bear "SOMEWHERE IN THE SOUTH PACIFIC 1943" billing in the opening scene. Bob Hastings (Carpenter) does not appear in this episode.
10	10	"The Battle of McHale's Island"	Sidney Lanfield	Marty Roth	December 20, 1962
Gruber is trying to sell some Japanese war souvenirs. At a meeting with other officers, McHale and Parker learn that Binghamton wants to build a new Officer's Club. Binghamton also announces it will be built on McHale's island. McHale tells his men they will not relinquish the island without a fight. The crew sabotages the building materials and the building plans. But it backfires when Binghamton says that until new building supplies arrive, he will just take over McHale's living quarters. McHale retaliates at Binghamton by having his crew move to the main base. Binghamton unsuccessfully tries to talk McHale out of it. But with McHale's crew on the base, Binghamton cannot enjoy the Officer's Club. He is always thinking McHale is up to something on the base. Binghamton believes that McHale is having a wild party with the nurses and heads back to the main base. Binghamton is not able to catch them in the act. The next day, Binghamton learns that Admiral Reynolds will visit. Binghamton will send McHale on a mission. That night, Binghamton is entertaining Reynolds at the Officer's Club. With the help of Gruber's war souvenirs, McHale plans to have Reynolds insist that McHale and his men return to the island. Clay Tanner as Marine Guard.
11	11	"The Day They Captured Santa Claus"	Sidney Lanfield	Larry Markes & Michael Morris	December 27, 1962
Pamela Parfrey (Anna Lee), head of a local orphanage, tells the children that Santa Claus will definitely come this Christmas. McHale, who will play Santa, and the men are wrapping presents for the children. Gruber steals some turkeys from Binghamton. Barney Skyler, from the United Press, comes to see Binghamton. Skyler goes with Binghamton to retrieve the turkeys. They arrive on McHale's island to find all the men wearing costumes. Parker tells them about the orphanage and Skyler says that would make a good story. Now Binghamton wants to go along. Pamela learns that some Japanese landed on the other side of the island. McHale and Tinker, who arrived first, are captured. McHale tries to bluff Major Simuru (Yuki Shimoda) into thinking his men walked into a trap. PT73 arrives with the other men and they are captured. Meanwhile, Pamela and a British Commander (Noel Drayton) are heading to the island. The British ship fires on the island and the Japanese surrender. The orphans are able to celebrate Christmas. Cherylene Lee as Tani, an orphan.
12	12	"Beauty and the Beast"	Sidney Lanfield	Tom Waldman & Frank Waldman	January 3, 1963
Binghamton tells McHale, Parker and Carpenter, that a war correspondent will come to the base to do a story on PT boats. Neither McHale nor Carpenter are interested in picking up the correspondent until they learn it is a woman. Binghamton will inspect the boats and whose ever is cleaner will host Patricia Brent. McHale has met her before. Meanwhile, Gruber meets Carol Kimberly (Ann McCrea), who is there to pick up film for the trip aboard the PT boat. Gruber thinks that she is Patricia Brent. On McHale's island, Gruber tells the men how beautiful Patricia is. They begin to clean the boat for the inspection. McHale knows what Patricia looks like and tells the men to stop cleaning the boat. Gruber decides to mess up Carpenter's boat. When the real Patricia Brent is assigned to the 73 crew, they find her foul-mouthed and unattractive. Patricia is a constant pain for everyone. McHale's plan to have Carpenter think that Carol is Patricia fails. When she realizes McHale is trying to get rid of her, Patricia tells him she will be on his boat for two weeks, not one. The men are excited when Carol has to fill in for Patricia, who became sick. Daria Massey as Lalanai.
13	13	"The Captain's Mission"	Sidney Lanfield	Jerry Davis and Danny Simon	January 10, 1963
McHale returns from an absence and Binghamton tells him that he took the 73 on a mission. McHale returns to his island and Parker tells him what happened. Flashback to Binghamton is with some other officers at the Officer's Club. Many of the men have war stories to tell. Binghamton feels bad that he has a desk job and he would like a war story to share with his battle-hardened fellow officers. With McHale in New Caledonia, Binghamton decides to take the 73 crew for some action. On the first trip, Binghamton makes a mess of things. Dreading another trip with Binghamton, the men suggest that they fabricate some action for him. The men want to use Fuji as a Japanese scout that Binghamton can fight with. But, Fuji does not make it onto the boat so they dress Tinker as a Japanese soldier. On the boat, the men make up a note about the Japanese being on a nearby island. They put Tinker on a raft so he can go to the island. Tinker winds up in a real Japanese scout group. When the Japanese discover Tinker is not one of them, he flees. Tinker is able to warn his crew and they return on the boat. They see the ship that the Japanese arrived on. Binghamton orders the firing of a torpedo. It winds up going on shore and hitting a truck. Binghamton exaggerates his story to the other officers. Frank Gerstle as Capt. Dawson. Walter Brooke as Capt. Burns. Mako as Japanese Soldier. Mark Tapscott as Capt. Adams
14	14	"Send Us a Hero"	Sidney Lanfield	Larry Markes & Michael Morris	January 17, 1963
McHale has his arm in a sling because he hurt it playing volleyball. Binghamton tells McHale that Congresswoman Clara Carter Clark (Jean Willes) will visit the base. She is visiting to find a regular GI to help sell war bonds in the States. Binghamton wants McHale to stay out of sight until she leaves. Gruber tells the men that the person that the Congresswoman picks can usually take his crew with them. Parker and the crew scheme to have McHale chosen for the war bond tour. Clara arrives and the crew talk him up. Clara hears the men singing about McHale. Though Binghamton tries to talk her out of it, Clara insists on meeting McHale. McHale tries to downplay the crew's claims of his greatness. Clara spends some time with McHale and he is picked. McHale only went along with it because he wanted the crew to have time off in the states. But when they learn that they will not be included, they plan to get McHale off the hook. The plan fails and Ms. Clark still insists on McHale going. That is, until she finds a certain other Commander who comes from her state of Massachusetts (implied to be John F. Kennedy).
15	15	"The Captain Steals a Cook"	Oscar Rudolph	Frank Gill, Jr. & George Carleton Brown	January 24, 1963
Gruber has been selling Fuji's Polynesian dishes to the Taratupa personnel. McHale returns from New Caledonia, learns what Gruber is up to and tells him to stop. Carpenter has one of the meals and tries to hide it from Binghamton. Binghamton finds it and loves the delicious food. Carpenter suggests that Binghamton have McHale's cook prepare a meal for visiting Admiral Striker (Frank Ferguson). McHale sends Tinker hoping that he will make a bad enough meal that Binghamton will send him back. Binghamton eats the horrible meal. He thinks McHale just had Tinker make it bad this time. Binghamton tells McHale that Tinker better make his good meals when Striker arrives. McHale decides to have Fuji make the meal and they will just ferry it over. Striker arrives and tells Binghamton that he has been put on a strict low-calorie diet. Carpenter tells Tinker to make a different meal. Tinker is able to signal McHale that he needs another meal. A Commander (Paul Smith) and his Ensign (Jerry Dexter) are on their boat and also see the signal. They think it is some Japanese code and send a warning to Taratupa. McHale manages to deliver the meal. McHale creates an explanation for the confusion and Striker is impressed. Clay Tanner as The Marine.
16	16	"The Ensign Gets a Zero"	Edward J. Montagne	S : Tim Conway & Gary Vinson; T : Walter Kempley	January 31, 1963
Ensign Parker is doing gunnery training, but he cannot hit the broad side of a barn. McHale is worried that if Binghamton becomes aware, he will get rid of Parker. After a hint from McHale, Gruber does not just give him a passing score, he gives Parker the best score on the base. When rough mouth Captain Kittridge (Don "Red" Barry) arrives at the base, he brags about the men on his boat. Binghamton now bets Kittridge his sea clock that Parker can shoot better than any of his men. The men are talking about the match and Virgil offers to stand in for Parker. McHale decides to hide Virgil in the brush and do the shooting, while Parker is also shooting. It is the day of the contest and Kittridge visits with his man, Ensign Dennison (Edward Mallory). Gruber makes some bets with Kittridge's men. Dennison shoots first and does really well. Two of Kittridge's men find Virgil and stop him from shooting. But Parker hits the plane that was pulling the target. Parker loses and Binghamton is furious. Kittridge's men come to collect from Gruber for the bet. McHale plans to save Parker from being shipped out. Binghamton goes with the 73 to take Parker to another ship. McHale and the men convince Binghamton that Parker saved him from an enemy attack. Patrick Waltz as 1st Sailor. Don Kennedy as 2nd Sailor.
17	17	"The Big Raffle"	Edward J. Montagne	Marty Roth	February 7, 1963
The crew rescue two French nationals, Mr. Gerard (Marcel Hillaire) and his beautiful young daughter Yvette Gerard (Claudine Longet), off an island that the Japanese have occupied. Parker tries to show off for Yvette and takes the wheel of the boat, despite not knowing what he is doing. The boat crashes into the pier at Taratupa. Binghamton tells Parker and the men to stay away from Yvette. Christy receives a letter from his wife saying she is going to have a baby. The men want to raise money for the baby. Gruber proposes a raffle. The winner will receive a nice dinner and a date with Yvette. Parker nervously asks Yvette if she will do it and she agrees. They have to keep it a secret from Binghamton. The crew have no trouble selling tickets and raise a large amount of money. It is time to draw the winner and Gruber is about to do it. A Marine Sergeant (Read Morgan) does not trust Gruber and says he will pick the winning ticket. The winning ticket number is 867. Parker goes to pick up Yvette. She says she cannot go as her father and Binghamton are taking her to dinner. Yvette tells Binghamton she has a headache and cannot go. Binghamton learns of the raffle and wants to end it. But then he realizes Admiral Reynolds has the winning ticket. Sally Mansfield as a nurse. Note: This is the briefest episode appearance of Commander McHale as he only appears in the first and the last scenes for a total of about one minute.
18	18	"One of Our Engines Is Missing"	Oscar Rudolph	Frank Gill, Jr. & George Carleton Brown	February 14, 1963
The engines of the 73 fail during a mission. McHale complains that ship has needed an overhaul for a long time. Meanwhile, Binghamton is in trouble with the Admiral because of something Binghamton believes McHale did. Binghamton would like to ship McHale and his crew out of Taratupa. When he learns about the 73's engine problem, he tells McHale he will have the boat decommissioned and split up the crew. McHale's crew will not go down without a fight when suddenly electrical parts from all over the base are missing. But Tinker still cannot make the engine run. The men see a new boat arriving and thinks it will be theirs. Binghamton says it is his boat. Capt. Evans (Ted Knight), the inspector, is set to arrive at the base the next day. Binghamton puts McHale's crew into the brig. The crew dress Fuji as Tinker. McHale and Parker will spend the night with Binghamton on his new boat. In the morning the 73 will be inspected. Capt. Evans arrives during the night. In the morning the 73 runs perfectly. Binghamton's boat runs fine also. Tinker tells McHale he took the parts from Evans' boat. Eddie Quillan as Sailor.
19	19	"The Natives Get Restless"	Norman Abbott	Bob Marcus	February 21, 1963
McHale's men are having some fun with the Native women when Binghamton arrives. Binghamton angers Chief Watara (Leon Lontoc) and the islanders when he orders the entire base not to have anything to do with them. McHale tries to explain to Binghamton that the Natives rely on them for income. Binghamton tells McHale that J. Pettibone, the Under Secretary of the Navy, will arrive next Saturday for an inspection. Binghamton says that McHale's men better not mess anything up. The men bring their laundry to Watara's women. Little Flower (Peggy Mondo), Watara's daughter, has a crush on Parker. The Chief now thinks the two are engaged. McHale tells Parker to just play along until after the inspection. Binghamton learns that Pettibone will not just inspect, he is also checking on Native / Navy relations. Little Flower comes to see Parker and then Binghamton arrives. Binghamton makes amends with the natives in order to make a good impression with the Secretary. But Parker runs off on Little Flower angering the Chief again. McHale now hears war drums. Pettibone arrives. Binghamton tells McHale to rectify the situation. Watara and his men land at Taratupa with war paint on. Pettibone is concerned that they do not look friendly. They become friendly when Little Flower picks Binghamton to be engaged to. McHale resolves the situation.
20	20	"The Confidence Game"	Sidney Lanfield	Frank Gill, Jr. & George Carleton Brown	February 28, 1963
Parker thinks he is not respected by the crew. He asks McHale for a transfer. McHale thinks Parker is just suffering from low self-esteem. McHale tells Parker to be more assertive. McHale makes the men follow orders. Binghamton tells McHale that the Admiral wants his crew to test some new torpedoes. Parker feels bad again when he causes Binghamton to fall in the water. McHale feigns sickness in order for Parker to be in charge of the torpedo mission. But things go wrong while trying to fire the torpedo and the crew have to abandon the boat. Binghamton becomes upset when he learns from McHale that Parker is leading the mission. Meanwhile, the crew are captured by the Japanese. On the island, McHale sees the 73 approaching unmanned. He and Willy arrive at the boat and search for the crew. The Japanese Lieutenant (Dale Ishimoto) becomes frustrated questioning Parker and will send the crew to a prisoner of war camp. McHale and Willy manage to capture the Japanese boat that had Parker and the men on it. McHale makes Parker's confidence return and they make the Japanese their prisoners. Note: Bob Hastings (Carpenter) does not appear in this episode.
21	21	"Six Pounds from Paradise"	Sidney Lanfield	Marty Roth	March 7, 1963
Binghamton complains to Carpenter that McHale is driving him crazy. Binghamton learns that a new Navy directive states that all overweight combat officers will be shipped out. A sneaky Binghamton tells McHale that he wants to befriend him. Binghamton has a week to see that McHale puts on an extra six pounds, enough to put him over the limit. Binghamton invites McHale out for beers. He makes sure that McHale's men have extra food rations. Binghamton treats McHale to large lunches. The week is almost over and Binghamton throws a dinner party for McHale. Nurse Molly mentions the special physical the next morning. McHale now realizes what Binghamton was up to. McHale is five pounds overweight. Gruber suggests that Virgil fill in for McHale at the physical. Parker makes Binghamton believe that McHale is hiding somewhere on his island in order to avoid the physical. The crew manage to strand Binghamton and Carpenter on McHale's island. Molly decides to collaborate with the plan. The Chief Medical Officer (Tom Brown) examines Virgil after being told by Molly that he is McHale. Binghamton is told that McHale passed. The Chief Medical Officer tells Binghamton that he needs to lose some weight.
22	22	"Washing Machine Charlie"	Oscar Rudolph	William Raynor & Myles Wilder	March 14, 1963
Taratupa has been attacked daily by a Japanese pilot known as "Washing Machine Charlie". Binghamton tells McHale that Admiral Reynolds has cancelled all leave until Charlie is found. McHale's men were about to start their leave and were looking forward to it. Gruber has a Japanese airplane wing tip he wants to sell while on leave. McHale tells the men leave has been postponed. The 73 searches several islands, but does not find Charlie. The crew plans to make it look as though they had downed Charlie and use the wing tip as proof. Binghamton gives them their leave. McHale learns about the fraud. Binghamton learns of it as well when he learns the wing tip was from a Navy plane. McHale has an island he wants to see before the Admiral arrives. On the island, McHale and Parker search. The rest of the crew is captured by the Japanese. McHale is able to capture Charlie. Parker dresses as Charlie and goes to free the crew. Some other Japanese think he is Charlie and put him in Charlie's plane. McHale frees his crew and captures the other Japanese. Parker goes flying off. Parker parachutes from the plane while over Taratupa. Mike Farrell as Gunner.
23	23	"Nippon Nancy Calling"	Sidney Lanfield	Danny Arnold	March 21, 1963
The 73 crew is listening to Nippon Nancy (voiced by Julie Bennett) on the radio. Among other things, she reveals some personal information about Binghamton. At an officer's meeting, Binghamton says that Admiral Reynolds is upset about Nippon Nancy. Binghamton suspects someone on the base is consorting with the enemy. He tells the officers to find the leak. Binghamton hints to McHale that maybe the leak is one of his men. The crew dismiss the idea that Fuji could be the spy. The next day Nippon Nancy talks about Binghamton's blood pressure. He realizes that he mentioned that to McHale the day before. Binghamton forces Parker to spy on McHale. McHale can tell something is going on and Parker confesses that Binghamton ordered him to spy on the crew. Binghamton comes to McHale's island and sees him talking to Fuji. Parker tells them what happened and they hide Fuji. Binghamton returns with some Marines to arrest the crew. But before he can do that, Carpenter arrives to arrest Binghamton. Carpenter tells McHale that the Japanese espionage ring was broken up in San Diego. They were operating in a Japanese restaurant that Mrs. Binghamton frequented. Admiral Reynolds does clear Binghamton. McHale makes Binghamton believe he did not really see Fuji.
24	24	"One Enchanted Weekend"	Edward J. Montagne	Frank Gill, Jr. & George Carleton Brown	March 28, 1963
Parker has been invited to Emile Gerard's island plantation. He would like to spend some time with Gerard's daughter Yvette. Binghamton denies Parker's request for three days leave. With Binghamton off the base, McHale plans to get Parker to Gerard's island. McHale does this under the guise of Parker setting up an observation post there. Parker is at Gerard's house and he sees a Japanese landing party hit the beach. Yvette suggests they dress Parker up as a Frenchman. Capt. Uzaki (Mako) tells Gerard that he will use the house for a temporary radio-jamming operation. When McHale and the crew return to base, Binghamton sends them to find the Japanese radio-jammers. That night, Parker manages to covertly send McHale a message about the Japanese. The next morning, McHale and the crew arrive on the island and pose as Frenchmen. They are able to capture the Japanese and blow up their jamming station. Note: Bob Hastings (Carpenter) does not appear in this episode.
25	25	"The Mothers of PT 73"	Sidney Lanfield	Larry Markes & Michael Morris	April 4, 1963
McHale's men are preparing for their first annual Gaming Festival. Meanwhile, Parker is officer of the day. He is playing around with Binghamton's dictating machine and leaves a message about Mother's Day. Capt. Bryce (Dan Frazer), from Navy Public Relations, is reading Binghamton's message. Somehow it is decided to try and have some mother's visit their Navy sons. Bryce arrives at Taratupa and tells Binghamton the Secretary of the Navy loved his idea. Binghamton has no idea what he is talking about. Bryce mentions he could only get three mothers. Binghamton arrives on McHale's island with Mrs. Parker, Mrs. Gruber (Naomi Stevens) and Mrs. Bell (Cheerio Meredith). The men hide all the gambling equipment. In a few hours all the navy men will show up for the gambling. McHale plans to take the mothers on a sightseeing trip on the 73 while the gambling is going on. But there is a mix-up when the mothers see some native women who will dance later. Binghamton learns of the gambling night and takes Bryce to McHale's island. But they only find the mothers playing bingo with the men and entertaining them. Bryce commends McHale.
26	26	"HMS 73"	Sidney Lanfield	William Raynor & Myles Wilder	April 11, 1963
Admiral Reynolds calls Binghamton and tells him that Admiral Percy Campbell (Ben Wright) will arrive at Taratupa. Binghamton is to provide him with an officer for the permanent position of Liaison Officer at British Fleet HQ in Australia. Binghamton decides to get rid of McHale. He wants to trick McHale's crew into believing that the British want a whole crew for a month's duty in Australia. The crew convince McHale to try to get the assignment. Lt. Commander Forbes (Noel Drayton) arrives on McHale's island and the men do all they can to impress him. Forbes agrees to take McHale. The crew then discover that they will not accompany him and that McHale will leave permanently. McHale first tries to act drunk and obnoxious, but it fails. The next day, McHale says goodbye to his men and leaves. McHale is in Binghamton's office when Parker arrives dressed as a British Admiral. Parker convinces Binghamton that McHale would not be right for the job. Admiral Campbell then arrives and pretends to know Parker. After leaving Binghamton's office, Campbell says the masquerade was not necessary. Campbell says that Admiral Reynolds requested that McHale stay with his men. James Forrest as Lt. Crandall. Diana Darrin as Sally.
27	27	"A Wreath for McHale"	Sidney Lanfield	Marty Roth	April 18, 1963
McHale and his crew have just returned from a mission and Binghamton wants to send them on another. Carpenter enters the office and says that war correspondent Brad Devery (Allan Melvin) has been shown his quarters. McHale realizes that is why Binghamton wanted them gone. McHale tells his men that they will go to a pleasure island instead. Meanwhile, Devery tells Binghamton he wanted to get a story about McHale. Just then, Carpenter says the area that McHale was going to is under heavy Japanese attack. When they cannot make contact with the 73, McHale and his crew are presumed killed in action. Wanting to be in Devery's story, Binghamton plays the part of the grieving commanding officer. McHale and the crew arrive at their island and see Binghamton holding a memorial service for them. Binghamton learns the crew is alive and went to another island. He wants to court-martial them. To have the charges dropped and have Binghamton save face with Devery, they devise a plan to have Binghamton rescue the 73. Things do not go as planned when Binghamton, Devery and Carpenter are captured by the Japanese. McHale and crew must now rescue them. Devery has his story about McHale. John Fujioka as Japanese Officer.
28	28	"Portrait of a Peerless Leader"	Sidney Lanfield	Frank Gill, Jr. & George Carleton Brown	April 25, 1963
The crew is throwing a birthday party for McHale with some of the nurses and native girls. Binghamton arrives and wants to know why he was not invited. McHale is suspicious. Binghamton says that he is up for a promotion and transfer. The Navy is sending personnel officer Captain Wilson (Herb Vigran) to appraise Binghamton. Binghamton would like McHale and the crew to be on their best behavior. Binghamton and Carpenter join the party. Afterwards, Binghamton tells Carpenter that Wilson's visit is to appraise McHale. McHale's men do what they can to make the island very Navy. Wilson arrives and inspects McHale's crew and boat. McHale really talks up Binghamton. Later, Wilson has a drink with McHale at the Officers Club. Wilson lets it slip that McHale is up for a States side job as instructor at a PT training school. McHale learns it was Binghamton's idea. The next day while on a reconnaissance mission, McHale and crew make themselves look completely incompetent. But then a real enemy sub is spotted and the crew sinks it. Wilson tells Binghamton that McHale is more useful leading his crew than as an instructor.
29	29	"Instant Democracy"	Oscar Rudolph	Howard Leeds	May 2, 1963
Binghamton catches Gruber making a trade with Chief Urulu which would give Urulu an old Navy jeep. Binghamton arrests McHale's crew and wants to court martial McHale and Parker. Urulu is upset with Binghamton for ruining the deal. Admiral Reynolds calls Binghamton and tells him that he needs to modify the Taratupa airstrip. And he only has a few days to do it. Reynolds tells Binghamton to take Chief Urulu and his tribe to help. Binghamton now needs McHale's help to make amends with Urulu. McHale gets Urulu to agree to talk to Binghamton. But after some lessons on democracy from McHale and Parker, Urulu makes outlandish demands for the services of his tribe. The tribe starts to work. When Binghamton refuses another of Urulu's demands, Urulu puts his tribe on strike. In an attempt to end Urulu's demands, McHale runs an election between Urulu and Maloko (Olan Soule) for president of the tribe. Maloko wins, but it does not wind up helping much. Maloko makes Urulu the Secretary of Labor.
30	30	"Camera, Action, Panic"	Sidney Lanfield	Martin Roth	May 9, 1963
Gruber is trying to make money by taking pictures of the sailors. Binghamton introduces combat photographer Mike Sweeney (Artie Johnson) to McHale and Parker. Apparently some at the Pentagon are questioning the value of PT boats in the war effort. Admiral Reynolds wants to prove them wrong and Sweeney is to film the crew in action. Sweeney has made some mistakes while filming before and Binghamton wants him to be careful. Gruber hopes to use Sweeney's movie camera to make money. Gruber has Tinker take Sweeney on a tour of the island. Gruber then sets up "Gruber's Home Movies". The crew search for a Japanese PT boat. Sweeney is having a hard time filming and the crew is more interested in posing than fighting. The crew does manage to sink the Japanese boat. While previewing the film, many of Gruber's scenes are in it. McHale and the men decide to stage the sinking of the Japanese boat and refilm it. They make the 73 look Japanese and the crew wear Japanese uniforms. They are on the open water and a US plane fires on them. Sweeney is unable to film anything. The 73 has engine trouble and a Japanese sub arrives. The submarine believes they are Japanese and leaves them alone. Sweeney films the 73 sinking the sub. Admiral Reynolds is pleased with the film.
31	31	"Alias Captain Binghamton"	Sidney Lanfield	Bob Fisher & Arthur Marx	May 16, 1963
Gruber and the men are selling moonshine in hair tonic bottles. McHale tells the men that Binghamton is sending another man to join the 73 crew. The men think it is a spy for Binghamton. Seaman Smoot (Joe Flynn in a dual role) arrives and he is the spitting image of Binghamton. Meanwhile, Binghamton tells Carpenter a photographer will come to photograph the base. Binghamton wants to keep him away from McHale's island. Binghamton opens a bottle of hair tonic and realizes it is alcohol. Hoping to frighten Smoot, the men dress as cannibals. Wanting to find McHale's still, Binghamton arrives on the island dressed as one of McHale's men. The men think Binghamton is Smoot and grab him. When McHale sees Smoot, he realizes his men have Binghamton. McHale frees Binghamton, who says McHale is looking at a court martial. The next day, Don Taggart (John Rodney), the magazine photographer, arrives. McHale has Smoot impersonate Binghamton and cancel the court martial. The presence of two Binghamtons on the base creates confusion. Binghamton is knocked unconscious by a coconut. Smoot becomes intoxicated at the Officers Club and chases Lt. Lovett (Sally Mansfield) around. With the help of pictures of drunken Smoot, McHale gets Binghamton to tear up the court martial orders.
32	32	"Parents Anonymous"	Sidney Lanfield	Marty Roth	May 23, 1963
McHale and the crew return from a three-day mission to find things missing. They then see a little Japanese girl. They learn her name is Kim Su (Cherylene Lee) and she is an orphan. She was on a hospital ship that stopped there briefly while on its way to an orphanage in New Caledonia. The men talk McHale into letting Kim Su stay with them. They set up a room for her. Kim Su does put a trimp in the men's nocturnal activities. Binghamton wonders why it is so quiet on McHale's island. Commander Carmichael and Lieutenant Plowright, two psychiatrists, arrive on Taratupa. They are there to check for men with "battle fatigue", who may need to be transferred. Binghamton takes them to McHale's island, but everything is normal there. Carmichael and Plowright wonder about Binghamton. The next day, McHale thinks they need to find Kim Sue a home. Carmichael and Plowright return to the island and find Parker with a doll. They then find Kim Sue's room and think it is Parker's. Binghamton is thrilled when they put in a transfer for Parker. When Binghamton hears that a little girl is missing from the hospital boat, he believes McHale and crew kidnapped her. McHale finds a couple to adopt Kim Su, but Binghamton wants to return her to the hospital ship. The psychiatrists help McHale change Binghamton's mind. Song: The crew of the 73 perform "Pretty Baby".
33	33	"McHale's Millions"	Sidney Lanfield	William Raynor & Myles Wilder	May 30, 1963
Gruber and the men are trying to make a deal with Chief Urulu for some native trinkets. The deal does not happen because Urulu raises his demands. McHale tells the men they are to investigate the crash site of a Japanese transport plane. McHale and the crew recover four million dollars in American cash at the site. The men are thrilled, but McHale thinks it is counterfeit. He wants to bring it to Binghamton. Binghamton and McHale learn from Admiral Druten (Tyler McVey) that the money is real. It was stolen by the Japanese from a bank in the Philippines. Before McHale can return to his island, Gruber trades the money to Chief Urulu for the trinkets. McHale tells them the money is real. They have to give Binghamton something else until they can retrieve the money. When the men reach Urulu, the Witch Doctor (Carleton Carpenter) is burning some of the money to appease the earthquake god. Gruber challenges Urulu to a winner-take-all poker game to retrieve it. But, Urulu insists on playing Parker, who is a lousy poker player. After discovering there is no money in the crates he was given, Binghamton comes to arrest McHale and the men. McHale reminds Binghamton that he signed a receipt for the money. With the help of a real earthquake and some luck, Parker wins back the money.
34	34	"The Hillbillies of PT 73"	Sidney Lanfield	Frank Gill, Jr. & George Carleton Brown	June 6, 1963
Willy, the PT-73 Radioman, is depressed because he has not received a letter from his Tennessee girlfriend Effie May in three weeks. Willy finally receives a letter from her, but it says she married another man. Meanwhile, Binghamton tells his officers that Congressman Carl Joymer (Don Harvey), from the Naval Appropriations Committee, will visit them. Captain Dryden (Henry Hunter) calls Binghamton about a message he received where every other word is Effie May. Binghamton threatens to ship out Willy. The crew suggests McHale contact Admiral Reynolds to prevent Willy from being shipped out. Binghamton tells McHale that Reynolds is sending a Communications Officer to test Willy. McHale and Parker meet a new nurse, Cindy Bates, who is from the South. They want her to cheer up Willy. But meeting Cindy does not make Willy feel any better. So McHale and the crew throw a big "Hillbilly Hoe-down" to cheer up their heartbroken friend. They get Cindy, Molly and the other nurses to dress country style. Dryden and Joymer arrive ahead of schedule and go to McHale's island. Binghamton tries to stop them from seeing the Hoe-Down. But Joymer is also from Tennessee and he makes sure that Willy is not shipped out.
35	35	"The Monster of McHale's Island"	Oscar Rudolph	S : Robert Kaufman; S/T : William Raynor & Myles Wilder	June 13, 1963
Admiral Hanson's son Bruce was being returned to the states. But the plane had a problem and had to land on Taratupa. Bruce finds Binghamton and Carpenter in violation of some Navy regulations and documents them for a report to his father. As it will be several days before the plane is repaired, Binghamton decides to send Bruce to McHale's island. Meanwhile, McHale finds the men with a lot of moonshine that they were going to sell to the Marines. Bruce arrives and documents violations. McHale hopes to scare Bruce off the island by pretending that the natives are attacking. The plan fails. The men are alerted about a Japanese submarine in the area. Bruce sneaks onto the 73. The crew locate the sub and then discover Bruce. McHale wants to return and Bruce says that is running from the enemy. Admiral Hanson arrives on Taratupa to pick up Bruce. Bruce breaks radio silence and Hanson and Binghamton learn he is on the 73. This also gives the 73's location to the enemy. They do manage to sink the sub. McHale has had enough of Bruce and spanks him. Later, Hanson thanks McHale for disciplining Bruce.
36	36	"Uncle Admiral"	Sidney Lanfield	Frank Gill, Jr. & George Carleton Brown	June 27, 1963
Carpenter tells Binghamton that Vice Admiral Tim Parker (Harry Von Zell) will arrive the next day. Carpenter mentions that Tim is on the Promotions Board. Binghamton learns that Tim is Ensign Parker's uncle. Binghamton makes Parker his personal aide, in the hope of impressing Tim. The 73 crew now think they can do anything with impunity. While on his plane, Tim tells Cmdr. Bill McIntyre (Harlan Warde) how inept his nephew is. Upon arriving, Tim is surprised that Parker is an aide. But Tim is uncomfortable with the fact that Parker is also a combat officer. Binghamton tells Parker to put in a good word for him to Tim. The 73 crew set up a casino in the air raid shelter. Tim is inspecting the base and finds the casino. He learns Parker's crew is running it. Tim wants Parker to pack his bags for a safer position in the States. McHale returns from New Caledonia and learns what happened to Parker. There is an air raid and McHale and the men go rescue Parker, who is on a small boat returning from McHale's island. Parker then shoots down the Japanese plane. Tim lets Parker stay when he sees that the 73 crew was willing to risk their lives for him.

=== Season 2 (1963–64) ===
Changes: The opening theme song has been slightly altered and Joe Flynn and Tim Conway are now billed in the opening credits.

No. overall	No. in season	Title	Directed by	Written by	Original release date
37	1	"The Day the War Stood Still"	Sidney Lanfield	William Raynor & Myles Wilder	September 17, 1963
Binghamton receives a case of rare champagne and hopes to hide it from McHale and his men. However, it is not long before the men steal it. They want to celebrate the first anniversary of Fuji being with them. Binghamton sends the 73 crew on a mission so he can search their island. While there, Binghamton captures Fuji and places him under arrest as a spy. McHale tries to convince Binghamton that Fuji is just a lost fisherman. Binghamton will fly Fuji to Com Fleet for interrogation. McHale plans to have the base think the war is over. Fuji will no longer need to be questioned. Parker does impersonations of several world leaders over the radio saying the war is over. The plan succeeds and crew free Fuji from the jail cell. While everyone is celebrating, Admiral Rogers (Roy Roberts) makes a surprise visit to the base. Rogers learns about the hoax and wants McHale to explain. Rogers then sees a Japanese super PT boat approaching the dock to surrender. McHale pretends that was the plan all along and Rogers commends him. John Fujioka as Japanese Captain. Clay Tanner as 1st Marine Guard.
38	2	"The Binghamton Murder Plot"	Sidney Lanfield	Story by : David Levinson; Teleplay by : Bob Fisher & Arthur Marx	September 24, 1963
McHale and the men are being bothered by an annoying bird and its calls. Binghamton comes to the island and is unhappy with the men being out of uniform. He gives them several rough punishments. Binghamton tells McHale that Admiral Tucker (Paul Bryar) will visit next week for fitness inspections. Binghamton needs his report to be exceptional. At the Officers Club, Capt. Harper (Walter Brooke) and Cmdr. Ellis (Mark Tapscott) warn Binghamton about being too harsh on his men. Binghamton overhears Gruber and Tinker talking about killing the bird and he thinks they are talking about him. At McHale's island, the men are shooting and throwing grenades at the bird. Binghamton arrives and thinks they are shooting at him. He now lives in fear. McHale wants to give Binghamton a surprise birthday party to try to get on his good side again. Nurse Molly Turner and Cmdr. Susan Lorimer get Binghamton to go to a nurses picnic. While on the boat, Binghamton realizes they are headed to McHale's island. He wrestles with Susan and jumps out. Tucker and Cmdr. Carter (Paul Smith) are approaching on their boat and see this. They think there is something wrong with Binghamton. McHale and the men finally get Binghamton to the party. Binghamton then learns that the crew was actually trying to kill a bird. Binghamton does receive a good report from Tucker. Clay Tanner as Sentry. Song: PT73 crew sing "For He's a Jolly Good Fellow".
39	3	"McHale and His Schweinhunds"	Sidney Lanfield	Frank Gill, Jr. & George Carleton Brown	October 1, 1963
Parker is upset because he let a Japanese patrol boat escape. Binghamton accuses Parker of cowardice. Parker feels better after a pep talk from McHale. McHale has Parker take the 73 out to check an engine. They spot a German U-Boat, but because of Parker's bad judgement, they are unable to sink it. Parker tells Binghamton about the German boat, but he does not believe it. Admiral Reynolds (Herbert Lytton) calls Binghamton and confirms what Parker saw. Binghamton goes with the 73 to search for the boat. They go to an island and Binghamton and Carter capture two Germans. They then spot Japanese unloading a boat. Carter pretends to be a German officer and Binghamton a prisoner. Parker learns from Lt. Yamasake (Mako) that the Japanese are to make contact with the U-Boat. McHale and the men arrive and are able to have explosives loaded on the U-Boat.
40	4	"Is There a Doctor in the Hut?"	Sidney Lanfield	S : Si Rose; S/T : William Raynor & Myles Wilder	October 8, 1963
Binghamton would like movie star Rita Howard (Lisa Seagram) to put on a show on Taratupa for Admiral Rogers (Roy Roberts). He calls her tour manager, Colonel Pryor (Bernie Kopell), who declines. Gruber and the men have war souvenirs they need to sell. They overhear the call. Gruber pretends that Christopher is Rita's cousin. He hopes that Binghamton will send them to New Caledonia where they can sell their stuff. Binghamton falls for it and wants Christopher to talk to Rita. McHale talks to Rita and she is willing to do the show, but Pryor says no. McHale has Parker dress up like a medical doctor to distract Pryor from stopping the show. They claim Pryor has a rare disease. Rita performs for Rogers and a crowd of sailors. Binghamton heads to the hospital to check on Pryor. Just when Pryor is about to unravel the boys' plan, Rogers claims Parker really is a doctor. Rita had informed Rogers of the scheme. Russ McCubbin as Guard At Hut Door. Song: Lisa sings "Shoo-Shoo Baby".
41	5	"To Binghamton with Love"	Sidney Lanfield	Marty Roth and Danny Simon	October 15, 1963
McHale is upset that the men took the 73 to go to a crap game. Binghamton arrives and tells McHale that Admiral Bensen (Bill Quinn) will doing an inspection tour on Taratupa. Binghamton learns about the 73 and the crap game. He will file court martial papers. Bensen tell Binghamton that in order to advance in the Navy, one must have the respect of his men. Binghamton lies and says his men are throwing him a testimonial dinner. Binghamton tells McHale he will drop the charges in exchange for the dinner. When the men cannot get anyone to willingly attend the dinner, McHale plans to combine the dinner with a big crap game. It is the night of the dinner and there is a large crowd. Learning that Benson will arrive, McHale has to delay the crap game. There is a fight when the men are told they cannot yet gamble. Binghamton learns of the crap game. However, he plays along with McHale's plan when Benson shows up. Louis Quinn as First Sailor. Don Edwards as First Marine. Bill Woodson as Narrator (voice).
42	6	"Have Kimono, Will Travel"	Sidney Lanfield	William Raynor & Myles Wilder	October 22, 1963
Admiral Reynolds reminds Binghamton of a conference this Saturday. Binghamton learns that McHale is planning the PT73 Follies on Friday to entertain the base personnel. Binghamton orders them to not have the show on Friday. They decide to have it on Saturday when Binghamton will be away. When Binghamton learns about the change, he orders McHale and crew to ferry him to the conference. On the way, a Japanese plane shoots holes in the 73's gas tanks. They make it to a Japanese controlled island and see some fuel drums. They find a truck full of Kabuki costumes and makeup. The men dress up. While some of the men are entertaining the Japanese, the others are stealing fuel. Parker ruins Binghamton's dancing Geisha act and the Japanese discover who they really are. They are able to escape with the fuel. At the base, Binghamton is coerced into letting McHale have his Follies. Mako and Allen Jung as Japanese Soldiers.
43	7	"Today I Am a Man!"	Sidney Lanfield	S : Si Rose; S/T : Marty Roth	October 29, 1963
New nurses arrive at Taratupa. Parker is quite taken with one of them, pretty Georgiana Comstock (Joyce Bulifant). Clumsy Parker is inept at impressing her and even makes a mess of Binghamton. To retaliate, Binghamton takes Parker off the 73 and puts him in charge of basic training for the nurses. The crew try to make the job seem important to Parker. Judo is the first lesson Parker is to give the nurses. Georgiana humiliates Parker by flipping him over. When a Japanese plane arrives, Georgiana shoots it down, not Parker. Embarrassed, Parker puts in for a transfer. McHale, the crew, and Georgiana want to help him to regain his self-esteem and stay. The idea is to have the men dress as headhunters and have Parker protect Georgiana. Parker figures out the plan. Things become complicated when Binghamton and some Japanese become involved. After the Japanese are captured, Parker feels like a man again. Leigh Chapman as 1st Nurse. Rollin Moriyama as Japanese Sentry.
44	8	"Jolly Wally"	Sidney Lanfield	Bob Fisher & Arthur Marx	November 5, 1963
Binghamton learns that Whit Barrett (Peter Leeds), a famous war correspondent, will visit the base. Parker does something to anger Binghamton. Binghamton learns that Parker is an old friend of Whit's. He makes Parker the Base PR Officer, hoping to become the subject of Barrett's next story. Parker nicknames Binghamton 'Jolly Wally'. He tells Binghamton that the name will catch on and everyone will remember the brave Commander who laughed in the face of danger. Barrett arrives and he does remember Parker. But Parker's plan to improve Binghamton's image backfires when he laughs at everything. Three weeks later, Barrett's story about Binghamton is in the paper and it is not flattering. Com-fleet sends Captain Saunders (Nelson Olmsted), a psychiatrist, to the base to evaluate Binghamton's mental capacity. Binghamton is upset, so Nurse Molly puts some tranquilizers in his drink. Not knowing that, Carpenter also puts some in. Binghamton is knocked out and then Saunders arrives. Then Saunders thinks Parker is Binghamton. In the end, things go well for Binghamton.
45	9	"Scuttlebutt"	Sidney Lanfield	Arnold Horwitt	November 12, 1963
McHale and crew receive a commendation from Admiral Rogers for a recent mission. Nurse Betsy Gordon (Barbara Werle) calls off a date with Tinker. Gruber and the men scheme to turn Tinker into a hero to impress Betsy. Gruber says they will spread the rumor that Tinker is going on a "secret mission" to test a new weapon against the Japanese. But the rumor of the mission soon spreads throughout the South Pacific. Binghamton wonders why he was not told about this mission. Admiral Rogers tells Binghamton to deliver a refrigerator to Admiral Walsh on a nearby island. Binghamton thinks Rogers is talking to McHale about the mission. McHale becomes upset upon learning of the rumor. Binghamton orders McHale to deliver the refrigerator so he will not be around for the secret mission. The men do not believe it is actually a refrigerator. Because of the rumor, the entire Japanese war machine believes the 73 is carrying a secret weapon. McHale has the refrigerator tossed overboard and the Japanese try to destroy it. They do sink a Japanese sub and are awarded medals for it. Betsy is still not impressed. Bart Burns as Enlisted Man Ryan.
46	10	"The August Teahouse of Quint McHale"	Sidney Lanfield	Ralph Goodman & Stan Dreben	November 19, 1963
McHale and the men feel bad that Fuji can never go with them to parties. They decide to throw a surprise teaparty for him. Meanwhile, Doc Whitmore (Nelson Olmsted) tells Binghamton that he needs some rest away from Taratupa. Carpenter tells Binghamton there are food items missing from the warehouse. Binghamton believes McHale is involved. Binghamton sees McHale hand Fuji some rifles. Binghamton is convinced that McHale and the crew are consorting with the enemy. By the time Carpenter looks, Fuji is gone. Whitmore comes to the island and Binghamton tells him what he saw. When no one believes him, he calls for a Naval Intelligence team to search McHale's island for evidence. To get him to end the search, McHale and the men plan to make Binghamton think he is losing his mind. They also cause Binghamton to think that the crew actually turned into Japanese. Binghamton goes on leave and the crew have Fuji's party. Clay Tanner as Marine Guard.
47	11	"French Leave for McHale"	Sidney Lanfield	Ralph Goodman & Stan Dreben	November 26, 1963
McHale and the crew have taken Binghamton to New Caledonia for a staff meeting. Binghamton confines the men to their boat. Despite that, McHale tells his men they can have three hours liberty. McHale runs into his old semi-friend, crooked Frenchman "Big Frenchy" (George Kennedy). Frenchy wants to use the 73 for some crooked business, but McHale declines. McHale and the crew are all imprisoned for various reasons. Parker was watching the boat when Binghamton calls him, saying the meeting will end early. Frenchy tells Parker that McHale is in jail. Parker winds up in jail as well and Frenchy takes the 73. McHale gets the crew out of jail. They then discover that Frenchy and the 73 were captured by the Japanese. They free Frenchy and capture the Japanese. Benny Rubin as French Police Chief. Dale Ishimoto as Japanese Officer. Peggy Mondo as Fifi. Dick Wilson as Policeman Guarding Boat. Note: Bob Hastings (Lieutenant Carptener) does not appear in this episode.
48	12	"The Happy Sleepwalker"	Sidney Lanfield	Frank Gill, Jr. & George Carleton Brown	December 3, 1963
Happy feels women do not find him attractive because of his baldness. He begins sleepwalking and taking the men's female pin-ups. The men want to increase Happy's confidence. Meanwhile, Binghamton believes that McHale's men have been breaking his "No fraternization" rule with the nurses. Binghamton sees Happy sleep walking. He orders Happy to be psychiatrically evaluated, and shipped out if found unfit for duty. McHale talks Lt. Anne Wright into going out with Happy. They will double date with Parker and Lt. Nancy Culpepper (Sheila Kuehl). The men steal a hair piece for Happy. Binghamton posts a notice that the Nurses quarters are off limits. Parker and Happy still go on their date, but Happy is shy with Nancy. Happy's hair piece falls off, but Nancy says she still likes him. McHale and the crew make sure Binghamton does not catch them. With his confidence back, Happy passes his psychiatric exam. Jackie Searl as Sgt. Flynn.
49	13	"A Letter for Fuji"	Sidney Lanfield	Bill Persky & Sam Denoff	December 10, 1963
The Japanese are dropping propaganda leaflets all over Taratupa. Fuji is depressed because he never receives mail. McHale would like Fuji to write a letter to his best girl back home in Japan. They then would do a secret mission to mail the letter from a Japanese-held island. Binghamton would like to drop propaganda leaflets on the Japanese. He has written it and wants McHale to translate it. Binghamton finds Fuji's letter. McHale claims it is a propaganda leaflet that he wrote. Binghamton decides to use that letter instead of his own and will make copies of it. While distributing the leaflets, the men are able to mail Fuji's letter. Only later does Binghamton learn the true words on the letter and he calls for intelligence to arrest McHale for treason. Parker dresses as a Japanese soldier and is able to obtain the letter from Fuji's girlfriend. Capt. Martin (John Zaremba) from Com-Fleet visits and congratulates McHale because many Japanese soldiers have surrendered because of the love letter. Fuji reads his letter and learns that his girlfriend got married. The picture she sent shows that she gained much weight. John Fujioka and Mako as Japanese soldiers.
50	14	"My Ensign, the Lawyer"	Sidney Lanfield	S : Si Rose; S/T : William Raynor & Myles Wilder	December 17, 1963
The printing press that Binghamton ordered finally arrives. But when he opens the crate, it is empty. Gruber and the crew are using the press to print up stories about the other soldiers, who send the home. Tinker admits to McHale that they took the press from Binghamton. Binghamton arrests Tinker and assigns Parker to be Tinker's Defense Counsel. Binghamton will preside over the trial. On the day of the court martial McHale wants to stall the trial until he can contact Admiral Rogers. Gruber formulates a plan and it involves Rogers' printing press. The men stage a fake air raid and are able to switch Binghamton's press for Rogers'. When the trial reconvenes, Rogers arrives. He sees that the press is his and frees Tinker. Rogers then threatens to put Binghamton on trial.
51	15	"Orange Blossoms for McHale"	Sidney Lanfield	Arnold Horwitt	December 24, 1963
Carpenter tells Binghamton that a civilian woman named Kate O'Hara (Joyce Jameson) will be on Taratupa for a few days due to plane problems. Binghamton learns that Kate was a shady saloon-keeper and a friend of McHale's. Binghamton wants Kate to stay away from the men on the base. The 73 crew do what they can to get Kate and McHale together. There is a new Navy directive ordering all married officers to be shipped home. This prompts Binghamton to scheme to have McHale marry Kate. When Kate learns that there is money in it for her and she would not actually have to live with McHale, she goes along with Binghamton's idea. Kate discovers that Binghamton lied to her, but he still blackmails her into the wedding. Kate tells McHale about Binghamton's plan. McHale gets Kate off the island. After Kate leaves, McHale realizes she took his wallet and watch. Clay Tanner as Marine Guard.
52	16	"The Creature from McHale's Lagoon"	Sidney Lanfield	William Raynor & Myles Wilder	December 31, 1963
Gruber and the men try to make money with some phony pearl oysters. They will let some soldiers find some. Then they will rent boats and other equipment to other soldiers who want to search for more. Chief Urulu (Jacques Aubuchon) says there are no pearls anymore since Caratonga, the "Serpent of the Lagoon", took them 100 years ago. Meanwhile, Binghamton is upset because all his civilian friends back home are earning much money. Binghamton confiscates Gruber's oysters and finds some pearls. Greedy Binghamton now goes to McHale's island to look for more oysters. McHale tells Binghamton the pearls are fake, but Binghamton does not believe him and orders McHale and the men to move to another part of the island. After seeing the pearls, Urulu muscles in on Binghamton's business as a partner. While fishing, Virgil snags an empty two-man Japanese sub. McHale and the crew put a stop to the whole operation by taking advantage of an old native superstition and turning the submarine into Caratonga. Binghamton becomes upset when Admiral Rogers gives McHale's men a citation for capturing the Japanese sub.
53	17	"A Medal for Parker"	Sidney Lanfield	Ralph Goodman & Stan Dreben	January 7, 1964
Parker is writing a war novel about a young Ensign who accomplishes much for the war effort. It includes his sinking of the biggest battleship in the Japanese fleet, the Yakamura. Parker receives a letter from his girl Mary, who says she is dating a war hero. Gruber decides to send a chapter of Parker's novel to Mary to help him win her heart. Mary manages to have the chapter printed in the paper. Meanwhile, Parker does something to anger Binghamton and is removed from the 73 crew. After reading the article about the sinking, Congressman Fogelson (Herb Vigran) wants to come to Taratupa to give Parker a medal. Binghamton hears about Fogelson coming and thinks he will receive the medal. Admiral Elliot (Bill Quinn) tells Binghamton that Parker will be awarded the medal. McHale and Binghamton learn about the article. A Japanese Officer (John Fujioka) also sees the article and sends the Yakamura to Taratupa. Fogelson arrives and McHale tries to tell him the truth, but no one will listen. During the medal award ceremony the Yakamura attacks the base. Bombers sink the ship. Admiral Elliot says that Parker turned out to be a hero anyway.
54	18	"The Balloon Goes Up"	Sidney Lanfield	Barry E. Blitzer & Ray Brenner	January 14, 1964
Binghamton is offered a promotion and transfer up to Fleet HQ. Meanwhile, Gruber and the crew are doing some trading with Chief Urulu. Carpenter tells Binghamton there is a shortage in the base's equipment inventory worth $157,000. He cannot be transferred until the equipment is accounted for. McHale goes to Gruber, who claims that most of the stuff was traded to Urulu. Urulu is trading with Japanese soldier Sessua (Mako). McHale pleads with Urulu to return the items so that Binghamton can be transferred. Urulu agrees to return the items but he forgets to tell McHale that one large item, a barrage balloon, was traded to Sessua. Admiral Rogers calls Binghamton and tells him that a Navy barrage balloon was seen flying over a Japanese island. McHale, with Urulu's help, is going to have to deal with the enemy. They catch the balloon, but Parker releases it with him floating with it. McHale has to shoot it down. But with all the delays, Binghamton's transfer is cancelled.
55	19	"Who'll Buy My Sarongs?"	Sidney Lanfield	William Raynor & Myles Wilder	January 21, 1964
The men are manufacturing sarongs from parachutes, to sell to the base personnel. But they are divided into two separate quarreling groups over Gruber's leadership. Carpenter tells Binghamton that several parachutes are missing. Admiral Reynolds calls Binghamton about an upcoming PT efficiency test. Any crew that fails will be shipped out for training and reassignment. Binghamton goes to McHale's island and sees the men arguing with each other. Binghamton figures a divided crew is bound to fail. McHale has had enough and calls off the sarong sale. To make sure the sale proceeds, Binghamton sends McHale away. The day of the test, the men have two competing sarong booths. Captain Meyers (James Nolan) arrives for the efficiency tests. McHale returns and Binghamton sends for his crew. McHale learns about the efficiency test. Their test initially does not go well. But, they redeem themselves by sinking a Japanese submarine.
56	20	"Evil-Eye Parker"	Sidney Lanfield	Marty Roth	January 28, 1964
Parker is taking a correspondence course in hypnosis. The men learn that the local orphanage was damaged by the last storm. They decide to put on a show to raise money for the orphanage. Binghamton tells Carpenter that Senator Block (Jim Boles), from the Armed Services Committee, is to arrive for an inspection tour on Saturday. Binghamton declines McHale permission for the show, but McHale intends to have the show Friday night. While trying to hypnotize Willy, Parker actually hypnotizes a spying Binghamton. Binghamton now agrees to the show and wants to participate. The men are rehearsing for the show and it is three hours to show time. Parker inadvertently snaps his fingers and Binghamton's trance ends. McHale has Parker rehypnotize Binghamton. Senator Block arrives a day early. In the end, the Senator enjoyed the show and commends Binghamton. Clay Tanner as The Guard.
57	21	"The Great Impersonation"	Sidney Lanfield	Story by : William Raynor, Myles Wilder& Si Rose; Teleplay by : William Raynor & Myles Wilder	February 4, 1964
Parker is a dead ringer for Smythe Pelley (Tim Conway in a dual role), an important British general. The men hope to make money having Parker pose with soldiers to have their pictures taken. After seeing Parker dressed up, Binghamton cancels the 73 crew's leave. The real general arrives at the base and Binghamton thinks it is Parker. Capt. Harlow (Walter Brooke) and Pelly would like to use Parker, as Pelly, to divert the attention of spies in New Caledonia. The real general can then invade a Japanese-held island. The mayor of Nouméa, New Caledonia (Rolfe Sedan) welcomes Parker and McHale. Henri (Henry Corden) and Renee (Susan Cummings), the spies, are fooled by Parker. Renee flirts with Parker. She tries to obtain information from Parker, but McHale arrives. During ceremonies and other events, Renee unsuccessfully tries to reach Parker. Henri tells her that if they do not obtain information, they will have to kill the general. An attempt is made on Parker but Binghamton obstructs it. McHale has the 73 crew dress up in disguises and help protect Parker. Because of Parker, Pelley is able to complete his mission.
58	22	"Urulu's Paradise West"	Sidney Lanfield	Ray Brenner & Barry E. Blitzer	February 11, 1964
Gruber and Chief Urulu are trying to sell parcels of island land to the Navy men. A disguised Binghamton arrives and arrests Gruber. Binghamton manages to insult and anger Urulu. Admiral Rodgers orders Binghamton to purchase one of Urulu's islands for the construction of a radar station. Now Binghamton has to suck up to the chief. Urulu is allowed to steer the 73, causing Binghamton to fall overboard. Urulu, knowing that the Navy is desperate for the island, greatly inflates the price. McHale and the crew plan to make Urulu think the land is worthless. With Fuji's help, they almost convince Urulu that the Japanese have invaded the island. Something Parker does, ruins that scheme. They convince Urulu that there is a volcano on the island and he practically gives the island away. But then something Binghamton does, reveals there is oil on the island. The Japanese really do attack the island. John Fujioka as Japanese Admiral.
59	23	"Dear Diary"	Sidney Lanfield	William Raynor & Myles Wilder	February 18, 1964
Binghamton finds Parker's diary, which includes details of the crew's shady activities. He intends to show it to Admiral Rogers. Fuji sees this and tells the crew. That night the men steal the diary from Binghamton's safe. Binghamton will personally escort Parker to the Admiral to testify about the contents of the diary. To prevent him from escaping, Binghamton handcuffs himself to Parker. McHale unsuccessfully tries to make a deal with Binghamton. While on the plane, Binghamton and Parker accidentally parachute from it. They land on a Japanese island and Binghamton cannot find the key to the handcuffs. They go to a supply hut to find a saw. They then wind up in a crate that is being flown to Tokyo. The pilot accidentally falls from the plane and Parker tries to fly the plane. While going to the island to rescue Binghamton and Parker, the 73 crew see the Japanese plane. They parachute from the plane and the crew rescues them. After some gentle persuasion by McHale, Binghamton changes his mind about taking Parker to the Admiral. Edward Mallory as The Co-Pilot.
60	24	"Babette Go Home"	Sidney Lanfield	Stan Dreben & Ralph Goodman	February 25, 1964
The 73 crew made an unauthorized stop at New Caledonia. They discover that Babette (Susan Silo), the lovely daughter of French businessman Charles Armand Bergerac (Jesse Jacobs), stowed away on board. She did it to be with Virgil. McHale is furious when he learns of it. Binghamton tells Carpenter that the Navy is in negotiations to buy an island for a supply post from Bergerac. McHale learns Binghamton is heading to his island where Babette is. Parker is not able to stop Babette from firing a machine gun. She hits Binghamton's small boat and it sinks. Binghamton learns of the girl and that she is Bergerac's daughter. He is set to court-martial the 73 crew. Parker dresses up like Bergerac and demands that his daughter be returned and the matter of the court-martial end. Babette plays along. After they leave a problem arises when Admiral Rogers arrives with the real Bergeac. Binghamton thinks the real Bergeac is a phony. Rogers, Binghamton and Bergeac catch McHale and crew before they can leave. Babette takes the 73, with Parker, for a ride. Bergeac apologizes for his daughter's behavior and agrees to sell his island.
61	25	"The Novocain Mutiny"	Sidney Lanfield	William Raynor & Myles Wilder	March 3, 1964
Gruber is running a gambling den in the sick bay. The Fleet Medical Officer, Admiral Harris (Paul Bryar), calls Binghamton. Binghamton is informed that his sick bay is over-run with men faking an illness. Harris will visit for an inspection. Fuji has a bad toothache, and McHale and the crew try to pull it themselves. When that fails, they must get him to the dentist. Binghamton wants all the wards cleared before Harris arrives. Parker poses as a patient and tries to obtain some medicine for Fuji's pain. Failing to do so, they try to disguise Fuji and bring him in. Harris begins his inspection. Dentist Frisby is about to work on Fuji when Binghamton arrives and expels everyone. The situation becomes complicated and confusing. In the end, both Binghamton and Fuji lose a tooth. Sandra Gould as a Nurse.
62	26	"Stars Over Taratupa"	Sidney Lanfield	Sam Locke & Joel Rapp	March 10, 1964
McHale and the men return from a nurse's luau. Fuji is upset that he can never be included. Binghamton confines the 73 crew to their island to build an air strip there. Binghamton actually did this because Five-time Oscar-winning director John Burton (Robert F. Simon) will visit Taratupa to shoot a documentary on PT boats and their crews. Binghamton does not want McHale's crew nearby. McHale learns of Binghamton's scheme. Binghamton does all he can to make sure that he is the lead in the production. But, McHale and the crew successfully scheme to become the stars of the film by staging an air raid. The crew of the 73 are excited about being in the picture. McHale tells Fuji that he cannot be included. Burton is a hard-driven man. The crew is all of a sudden not as happy as they thought they would be. Burton is able to film the crew shooting down a real Japanese plane. The crew learns that Fuji has sneaked into the production and they want to edit him out while Burton is fishing. When they ruin the film, they must re-shoot the movie themselves, with surprising and humorous results.
63	27	"Comrades of PT 73"	Sidney Lanfield	Arnold Horwitt	March 17, 1964
Admiral Farley (Bill Quinn) calls Binghamton and tells him that a Russian Naval officer named Commander Krasni will arrive that day to study PT operations. Binghamton is to give Krasni the VIP treatment. When Krasni (Sue Ane Langdon) arrives, everyone is surprised to see a female. Krasni says she will be assigned to McHale's crew. Krasni is a strict officer and soon the men want her gone. She is disgusted with the 73 crew's lack of discipline and requests assignment to another crew. When Binghamton learns that the chosen crew will shipped to Russia, he convinces Krasni to remain with McHale. McHale and the men scheme to end the situation. Russian Admiral Gurevitch (Cliff Norton) arrives to meet Krasni. Virgil and the men make Krasni know what it feels like to be a woman. They have a party with vodka and dancing. Gurevitch likes Krasni. They decide to not take the 73 to Russia.
64	28	"The Return of Big Frenchy"	Sidney Lanfield	Ralph Goodman & Stan Dreben	March 24, 1964
Big Frenchy, the thief and con-artist, arrives in Taratupa. He has been stealing from US Naval supply stations claiming to work for the French underground. Frenchy cons Binghamton into believing his story and gives him a long list of supplies he needs. McHale tries to tell Binghamton that Frenchy is a crook, but he does not believe him. Frenchy convinces Binghamton to send McHale and the crew on a mission to keep him out of the way. McHale tells Parker, who is Officer of the Day, to keep an eye on Frenchy. Admiral Rogers comes to the island and Binghamton goes to greet him. Frenchy hears this and his men load the supplies onto their boat. Parker catches him. Frenchy cons Parker into helping him get the supplies to New Caledonia by claiming Parker's been made a Major in the French Underground. Admiral Rogers warns Binghamton about a Frenchman stealing supplies. By the time Binghamton arrives at the dock, Frenchy is gone, taking Parker as a hostage. McHale and the men capture Frenchy, rescue Parker, and recover the supplies.
65	29	"Alias PT 73"	Sidney Lanfield	Sam Locke & Joel Rapp	March 31, 1964
McHale and the men are at a Luau at a neighboring island. The area is being bothered by a Japanese fighter that they call 'Hit-and-Run Harry'. During the Luau, Harry flies by and bombs part of the natives village. The men learn that Harry sunk PT 25. Admiral Rogers tells Binghamton that the crew of PT 25 will be reassigned. Binghamton plans to restrict McHale and the men to their island. Then maybe Harry can hit PT 73 and McHale's crew will also be reassigned. McHale and the men make the damaged PT 25 resemble the 73. They can then sneak a load of building materials to help the natives rebuild their village. Binghamton goes to McHale's island. Parker finds a way to get rid of him just as McHale is arriving with the building supplies. At the base, Binghamton learns that the supplies were stolen and figures it was McHale. On McHale's island, Binghamtom finds the mocked up PT 25 and thinks Harry hit the 73. Binghamtom shows Rogers the damaged 73 hoping he will reassign McHale and his men. They discover that the boat is really the 25. Binghamton tells Rogers that McHale and crew have deserted. The 73 returns to the island and the men see Binghamton and Rogers and realize they are in trouble. When McHale manages to shoot down Harry, Rogers forgets about Binghamton's accusation.
66	30	"The Rage of Taratupa"	Sidney Lanfield	Bob Fisher & Arthur Marx	April 7, 1964
Pampered rock-and-roll star Harley Hatfield (Jesse Pearson) is temporarily assigned to Taratupa. Harley is becoming such a distraction, that Binghamtom assigns him to McHale's island. Once on the island, Harley tells the men he would like to capture some Japanese. McHale is not thrilled with Harley because he would be useless in a real fight. In order to get rid of Harley, McHale plans to disguise Tinker as a Japanese soldier and let Harley capture him. While on the fake mission, the men are attacked by a real Japanese patrol and Harley is captured. Meanwhile, Admiral Steinholtz (Willis Bouchey) calls Binghamton and tells him that Harley is to put on a performance that night. McHale learns about Harley's performance and takes a few of his men to find him. It is time for the show and Parker stands in for the singer to stall for time. Steinholtz has never seen Harley and is not impressed. With Harley singing, the Japanese are a captive audience, making it easy for McHale and the men to take them prisoners. Just as Steinholtz realizes it is not Harley, McHale arrives with the real Harley and the Japanese prisoners. John Fujioka as Japanese Officer.
67	31	"Ensign Parker, E.S.P."	Sidney Lanfield	Frank Gill, Jr. & George Carleton Brown	April 14, 1964
During the night, Parker wakes everyone up yelling "Air Raid". He tells them he dreamt a plane dropped a bomb on the cook shack. Just then a Japanese plane bombs the shack. The men think Parker has ESP. While scuba diving, Vigil finds a box with a Japanese map to buried treasure on Taratupa. Meanwhile, Binghamton bought a string of pearls for his wife. The pearls get destroyed when Parker tries to save Binghamton from what he thought was an air raid. To keep Parker from being shipped out, McHale and the crew have to raise $1000 to replace the pearls. They decide to follow the treasure map. But the map leads them to under Binghamton's hut. That night while Binghamton is away, the men move his hut. Binghamton returns early and finds his hut missing. He tells Carpenter and McHale that his hut is gone. By the time he brings them to the spot, the men have returned the hut. McHale manages to sedate Binghamton and the men move the hut with him in it. While trying to get the hut loose from a stump, Binghamton is ejected from the hut. McHale convinces Binghamton that Parker had another premonition and they moved his hut to save his life from an enemy plane's bomb.
68	32	"The McHale Mob"	Hollingsworth Morse	William Raynor & Myles Wilder	April 21, 1964
Impressed by a gangster movie he recently saw, Chief Urulu plays mob chieftain and goes back on a booze deal he had with the crew. Admiral Rogers informs Binghamton that the treaty for the use of McHale's island was never signed by Urulu. Binghamton likes the idea of McHale and the crew returning to the base. He can then watches every move they make and wait for a slip up. Urulu, playing mob boss, refuses to sign the document. Binghamton tells McHale he must leave the island. McHale and Parker go to talk to Urulu, but get nowhere. Urulu demands protection money from Binghamton or he will go to Rogers. Binghamton now wants McHale's help to get Urulu off his back. McHale plans for them to play their own mobster game. The crew dress up as mobsters and enlist the help of Binghamton and Carpenter in their stunt. They frighten Urulu into agreeing to sign the treaty. Parker goes to get a pen and runs into Admiral Rogers. Rogers plays along with the ruse and Urulu signs the treaty. Nestor Paiva as Big Louie, in the gangster film. Hoke Howell as Witch Doctor.
69	33	"Carpenter in Command"	Hollingsworth Morse	Ray Brenner & Barry E. Blitzer	April 28, 1964
Binghamton trips over a broom and breaks his leg. Nurse Molly Turner tells him he will be laid up for a week. Binghamton is forced to put Carpenter in command. The 73 crew now think they can get away with anything they want. Carpenter is now drunk with power. He catches the crew with their still. Carpenter records Gruber trying to bribe him. He now has them up for Court Martial on those serious charges. McHale schemes to make the injured Binghamton think that Carpenter is trying to get the Captain's job. Binghamton has a dream that Carpenter has become an Admiral and is cruel to him. Binghamton falls for McHale's scheme and now he thinks that Carpenter has called a meeting with Admiral Rogers to discuss his retirement. In a fit of rage, Binghamton destroys all of Carpenter's evidence against the 73 crew. Bart Burns as Yeoman Harris.
70	34	"Marryin' Chuck"	Sidney Lanfield	Marty Roth	May 5, 1964
Gruber and the men pick up a few souvenirs during a mission and wind up selling them all. They learn that the items were valuable and stolen by the Japanese during the battle of Manila. Admiral Edgar Hardesy (John Zaremba) calls Binghamton and tells him his daughter will get married in New Caledonia the next day. Hardesy's Chaplain is ill and he would like Binghamton to sends his. Carpenter bought a tea set from Gruber, not knowing it is a priceless antique. He offers it to Binghamton as a wedding gift for Hardesy's daughter. The men are able to buy all the items back except the tea set. McHale and the crew must make a hasty trip to New Caledonia by taking Chaplain Conklin (Jess Kirkpatrick) there. The men are unable to enter the building where the wedding is to take place. They hope to talk Conklin into helping them, but now they cannot find him. Gruber gets Parker to play the part of the Chaplain as part of a scheme to get into the wedding. Parker actually performs the ceremony. Binghamton's arrival complicates the situation. Conklin exchanges the tea set and officially marries the couple later, saving the day. Eleanor Audley as Mrs. Millicent Hardesy.
71	35	"The Dart Gun Wedding"	Norman Abbott	William Raynor & Myles Wilder	May 12, 1964
Binghamton catches McHale and the men partying with some nurses on the 73. Carpenter tells Binghamton about an Ensign that is laid over for three days. The Ensign is Roger Whitfield III (George Furth), the snobbish, swinging-bachelor son of his former employer. Chief Watara's daughter, Little Flower (Peggy Mondo), wants a ride on the 73, but McHale cannot do it. Binghamton bows to pressure from Roger in the hope of returning to his stateside job after the war. Whitfield takes advantage of the situation and bosses Binghamton around like a servant. Roger has Binghamton to throw a party for him. Whitfield considers being permanently transferred to Taratupa and having Parker shipped out. Binghamton conspires with McHale and the 73 crew in a plan to get rid of him. They do this by pretending that Whitfield saves Little Flower's life and now has to marry her. Roger now wants an immediate transfer. Things get complicated when Binghamton almost has to marry Little Flower.
72	36	"A Da-Da for Christy"	Frank McDonald	Burt Styler & Albert E. Lewin	May 19, 1964
Christy has a chance to hear his little girl call him Daddy, courtesy of ham radio operator Mr. Potter (Phil Arnold) in the States. Binghamton denies the use of the base radio. McHale and the boys have to formulate a plan where they can get into the guarded radio hut to listen to the transmission. Things do not go as planned and Christy does not hear his daughter's words. With the Japanese jamming the frequency there is little hope that the transmission will continue. Binghamton catches the men and wants to bring them up on charges. After a call from the Admiral, Binghamton orders all the PT crews to search for the jamming devices. The 73 crew find the radio-jamming devices but instead of destroying the radio, they take the radio back to their island so they can transmit to the states. But when they transmit, the admiral calls Binghamton and says that the jamming device is on McHale's island. Thinking that McHale is collaborating with the Japanese, Binghamton sets out to arrest the crew of the 73. But when the baby talks, even Binghamton gets into the spirit of things. Cindy Robbins as Christy's wife. John Fujioka as Japanese Radio Man. Note: This episode marks the final appearance Gavin MacLeod as Happy.

=== Season 3 (1964–65) ===
No. overall	No. in season	Title	Directed by	Written by	Original release date	Prod. code
73	1	"The Ghosts of 73"	Earl Bellamy	William Raynor & Myles Wilder	September 15, 1964	25303
The crew of the 73 has been having bad luck recently. Willy mentions that it is Friday the 13th and they see a black cat. When Binghamton learns how superstitious McHale's crew is, he plans to scare them into transferring. The crew see that Carpenter changed their boat's number to 13. Carpenter tells them the boat was originally the 13, but was changed to 73 after a disaster. The boys learn that two crews were lost on the boat. McHale tries to talk them out of being superstitious. Binghamton convinces the crew that their ship is haunted. The crew then request a transfer. But when McHale and the men find that they have been duped, they plan to scare Binghamton into canceling their transfers. The men make Binghamton believe that because of him, the 73 boat has been sunk with the crew being killed. They then pretend to haunt Binghamton. A terrified Binghamton lets McHale burn the transfers. But then he discovers the crew is alive and he was tricked.
74	2	"Lester, the Skipper"	Earl Bellamy	Ralph Goodman & Stan Dreben	September 22, 1964	25305
Gruber has been writing his girlfriend Ginger (Jean Hale) back home that he is a Lieutenant Commander. Ginger pays a surprise visit to Taratupa as part of a traveling service show. The men tell Ginger that Commander Gruber is on a secret mission. Binghamton learns that he is to assign one of his officers to a British Liaison's position. He calls Commodore Norcross (Ben Wright) and suggests sending McHale. Gruber is depressed because he cannot see Ginger. McHale reluctantly agrees to help Gruber save face by allowing him to briefly act out the part. Ginger arrives on the island. McHale becomes upset when Gruber overacts his part. Norcross skips meeting up with Binghamton and heads to McHale's island. He brings Lieutenant Crowder (James Forrest) with him and wants to surprise McHale. Just as Ginger leaves, Norcross arrives. Gruber has to pretend to be McHale. Confusion ensues when Norcross wants to go on a mission with the 73 and they run into a Japanese sub. The crew learn about Binghamton's plan when Norcross decides to not take McHale as a liaison.
75	3	"It's a Mad, Mad, Mad War"	Charles Barton	William Raynor & Myles Wilder	September 29, 1964	25309
The crew of the 73 is in New Caledonia while McHale attends a staff meeting. McHale gives the men permission to go on an unauthorized liberty. Parker is left to watch the boat. Binghamton is told that he needs to send a boat to pick up the base payroll of $62,000. Binghamton will assign the 73 to do it. He hopes McHale and his men will steal the money and can then be court-martialed. Because the rest of the crew is gone, Parker has to pick take money alone. Parker trips and is knocked out. When he comes to, there is a crowd around him and the money is gone. He was robbed by Yvette and Bertrand (Hoke Howell). Parker tells McHale and the men that he remembers a girl who had a birthmark of a heart on her ankle. McHale and the men frantically try to locate the girl before Binghamton can accuse them of the theft. Binghamton arrives and chases the men. Thanks to an air raid and Parker being Parker, they find the money. Michael Blodgett as Boy On Park Bench.
76	4	"McHale, the Desk Commando"	Charles Barton	Tom Waldman & Frank Waldman	October 6, 1964	25307
Binghamton learns that tough Admiral Rafferty (Philip Ober) will arrive today for an unscheduled inspection. There are many problems at the base right now. Binghamton decides to fake an illness and check into the base hospital. He will appoint McHale as temporary Base Commander to face Rafferty. Gruber mistakenly thinks that McHale gave him permission to throw a party with hula-girls. Binghamton learns of the party. He then sends nurse Lt. Wilson (Raquel Welch) to McHale. She is in a bathing suit and wants to take McHale for a swim. McHale hears that Rafferty has landed and he realizes Binghamton's plan. Parker hides the hula-girls in the air raid shelter. Confusion ensues when Rafferty catches Binghamton with Lt. Wilson. Parker has to keep moving the hula-girls around. McHale does pass the inspection and Rafferty thinks Binghamton needs a long rest. Henry Hunter as The Doctor.
77	5	"McHale's Floating Harem"	Charles Barton	Ralph Goodman & Stan Dreben	October 13, 1964	25302
Binghamton tells Carpenter that the Japanese are threatening to attack Sultan Karim's (Henry Corden) island. The Sultan and his three daughters will visit Taratupa. The admiral forces Binghamton to send McHale and the 73 to rescue the royal family when Karim's plane has a problem. Karim warns McHale that the sailors should stay away from his daughters, Siri, Kara and Rimi. McHale is to attend a dinner for the Sultan. His men are restricted to their island. Virgil tells the men that he has a date with Siri and wants to give her a romantic boat ride. The men keep Parker occupied while Virgil takes the boat. Karim tells Binghamton that he would like to steer the 73 before dinner. McHale calls Parker and learns that Virgil has the boat. McHale will stall Karim until the men can get a hold of Virgil. Parker radios Virgil and learns that the 73's engines failed. Parker must become Siri's stand-in while the men hustle to return the real princess. During dinner Karim has his daughters dance for the men. Binghamton suspects one of the daughters is an impostor. Binghamton is humiliated when Siri returns in time. Note: Even though he left the series at the end of season two, Gavin MacLeod appears as Happy in this episode.
78	6	"Laugh, Captain, Laugh"	Earl Bellamy	William Raynor & Myles Wilder	October 20, 1964	25301
McHale has a tooth pulled. He was given nitrous oxide, or "laughing gas", during the procedure. Parker nearly drowns Binghamton during an accident on the 73. Binghamton will call for a Fitness Board inquiry to determine Parker's fitness for duty. McHale plans to change Binghamton's mind which involves the laughing gas. Binghamton receives a dose of the gas. He becomes so jovial, he cancels the Fitness Board. But when the gas wears off, Binghamton wants the inquiry to proceed. He receives another dose and chases a nurse (Julie Gregg) around. Admiral Shoemaker (Bill Quinn) from the board arrives early. Shoemaker sees Binghamton dancing with the Nurse on a table in the Officer's Club. After Parker inhales the gas, he shoots down an enemy plane during an air raid. Shoemaker believes Parker to be brave and now has his doubts about Binghamton.
79	7	"Will the Alligator Take the Stand?"	Earl Bellamy	Ralph Goodman & Stan Dreben	October 27, 1964	25310
Binghamton is hiding some champagne in his wall safe, but Gruber is taking the bottles from a hole he opened on the outside of the building. Carpenter has received three months of back pay. Binghamton takes the money to use as bait for McHale and his crew. Parker befriends an alligator and names it Sydney. Binghamton leaves his wallet, with Carpenter's money, on McHale's island, hoping to frame the crew. Before they can find it, Sydney makes off with it. Parker sees Sydney with the wallet in his mouth. Parker is only able to get the ID card from the wallet. Binghamton finds Parker with the card and arrests him. McHale tries to explain about Sydney, but Binghamton does not believe him. McHale and the men find Sydney. Meanwhile, Parker's court martial proceedings have begun. McHale and the men arrive with Sydney. They are able to prove Parker is innocent when they see Binghamton's wallet in Sydney's mouth. Walter Brooke as Captain Swan.
80	8	"The British Also Have Ensigns"	Earl Bellamy	Sam Locke & Joel Rapp	November 10, 1964	25311
Binghamton wants to impress visiting British Sub-Lieutenant Cedric Clivedon (Bernard Fox), as his cousin is British Admiral Clivedon Sommers (Maurice Dallimore). Cedric arrives and proves to be clumsy. Binghamton learns that Cedric sank the three boats he was assigned to. Binghamton decides to send him to McHale's crew. McHale realizes that the three boats that Cedric sunk were his own and figures out Binghamton's plan. McHale does not want Cedric on the 73, so he tells him to guard the island. Cedric stumbles upon Fuji. He arrests him and brings him to Binghamton. McHale plans to free Fuji. Parker dresses up as Admiral Sommers. He convinces Binghamton that Fuji is actually a British agent. Things get complicated when the real Admiral Sommers arrives. Just then there is an air raid. Something Cedric does helps down the Japanese plane. Because the crew was good to Cedric, Sommers plays along that Parker really is a British Admiral.
81	9	"Senator Parker, Suh!"	Charles Barton	S : Henry Sharp; T : Sam Locke & Joel Rapp	November 17, 1964	25306
The crew believes that Parker will be promoted to Lieutenant and prepare to celebrate. McHale breaks the bad news that Binghamton passed over Parker again. Parker is depressed and the men try to cheer him up. Gruber devises a way for Parker to vent his frustrations. He makes up a punching-bag that resembles Binghamton. While Parker goes to get some boxing gloves, the real Binghamton arrives. When Parker returns he hits the real Binghamton. Parker winds up in the brig, pending Court Martial. Gruber remembers that the head of the Senate Naval Affairs Committee is Senator Joseph Parker. The men will try to get Binghamton to believe that the Senator is Parker's uncle. Binghamton releases Parker and promotes him to Lieutenant. Things backfire for the men when they hear that the Senator will visit Taratupa. McHale finds a way to destroy Binghamton's glasses. They then stage the arrival of the Senator, who is Gruber dressed up. Meanwhile the real Senator arrives. When Carpenter tells the Senator that Binghamton is not around, the Senator decides to leave. When the real Senator's plane is mistakenly shot down by Parker, Binghamton realizes the truth. The Senator is upset until he learns that Willy is from his home state. Bart Burns as Pilot.
82	10	"Fountain of Youth"	Hollingsworth Morse	Andy White	November 24, 1964	25308
With a youth oriented Admiral named Go-Go Granger (Ted Knight) set on visiting the island, Binghamton wants to show the Admiral that he still has spunk. With his new name of Bing-Bing Binghamton, he leads the 73 on a patrol to a nearby island. The problem is that on the island is where the crew makes their moonshine and Binghamton is bound to find out. The still is damaged in an air raid and its contents spill into a stream. After the plane leaves, Binghamton suddenly feels tired. Binghamton and Parker drink from the stream and become intoxicated. To protect their secret, McHale and the men convince Binghamton that the reason he feels so good is that he has partaken of "The Fountain Of Youth". Binghamton fills several canteens with the water to take back with him. McHale was hoping to return to the island to get rid of the still. Binghamton thinks McHale is going back to steal more of the Fountain Of Youth water and confines the men to the base. Binghamton drinks more of the water and passes out. McHale puts a fake beard on Binghamton making him look old. McHale then tells Binghamton that he was actually drinking from the Fountain of Old Age. Go-Go Granger does arrive and is upset because he believes that Binghamton has been drinking while on duty.
83	11	"The Great Eclipse"	Frank McDonald	Stan Dreben & Ralph Goodman	December 1, 1964	25314
Gruber is going to host an eclipse party. Admiral Rogers calls Binghamton. Rogers wants Binghamton to negotiate a treaty with the head-hunting natives of a nearby island, for the construction of an airstrip. Binghamton decides to send McHale's crew on the risky mission. But the native Chief (Stanley Adams) refuses to sign until their recently deceased witch doctor has been replaced. McHale picks Gruber to fill in, as he can do magic tricks. One of his tricks angers the Chief and the men flee from the natives. Parker is captured. Just then the eclipse happens. The Chief thinks Parker is a powerful witch doctor. The Chief agrees to sign the treaty. Binghamton and Carpenter arrive for the signing. The Chief now wants Parker to stay with the tribe and marry the old witch doctor's wives. McHale's crew is to return the next day for the wedding. At the wedding, Tinker is dressed as a woman who claims to be Parker's wife. Something Binghamton does causes the Chief to want him as the witch doctor. Ned Romero as the Fierce Native.
84	12	"McHale and His Jet Set"	Hollingsworth Morse	John Fenton Murray	December 8, 1964	25312
Parker receives a letter saying he is an heir to his aunt's estate. McHale says there might be other heirs that he will have to share with. Binghamton has his eye on a piece of oceanfront property in New Caledonia. Parker gets in trouble with Binghamton, who threatens to ship him out. Parker receives another letter stating that all of his aunt's money went to a bird-watching society. He received a stuffed owl and a couple other things. So as to not have Parker shipped out, McHale wants to let Binghamton think that Parker is a millionaire. Binghamton asks Parker for a $20,000 loan and Parker seems to agree to it. Binghamton goes to see Fair Pierre (Lee Bergere), the real estate man. Binghamton gives Pierre an IOU. He then learns that Parker has no money. Binghamton joins McHale and the crew in a scheme to get out of the deal. They convince crooked Pierre that some of the crew are quite wealthy. Pierre tears up the IOU when he is offered more money for the oceanfront property. Just then Admiral Rogers arrives. Rogers recognizes crooked Pierre. McHale says this was all a plan to capture Pierre. Victoria Carroll as 1st Nurse.
85	13	"Christy Goes Traveling"	Charles Barton	Ralph Goodman & Stan Dreben	December 15, 1964	25316
All Christy can think of is his daughter's upcoming second birthday. He has never seen little Christina. He causes the 73 to crash into a coral reef, damaging the boat. Gruber says that he and the men sent a letter to Fleet Command hoping to have Christy chosen as the Navy's "Father of the Year". Christy risks being AWOL, when he tries to hitch a ride on a bomber bound for his home town of San Diego. Meanwhile, Binghamton learns that war hero Colonel "Black Jack" Cooper (Leonard Stone) is on base. Cooper wants to have a navigation briefing with Christy. McHale hears about Christy being on the bomber. Parker pretends to be Christy and it goes poorly. Captain Burton arrives to tell Binghamton that Christy has been chosen Father of the Year. Christy will be sent to the States for his daughter's birthday. Burton takes Parker, who is still posing as Christy. But Christy is bumped off the flight. Now the men must switch Christy for Parker. Things get complicated when Parker accidentally takes off in a plane alone. Burton learns who the real Christy is and will take him home.
86	14	"The Missing Link"	Hollingsworth Morse	William Raynor & Myles Wilder	December 22, 1964	25304
Parker accidentally fires a torpedo at the dock where Binghamton is. Binghamton is going to send him to a tiny island that the Japanese use for target practice. Carpenter tells Binghamton that a transport plane was forced to land at Taratupa with engine trouble. Onboard the plane is Binghamton's lovely niece Cynthia Prentice (Marlo Thomas). Cynthia is an anthropology grad student. McHale thinks Parker should make a play for Cynthia and maybe she will convince her uncle to keep Parker around. Cynthia is interested in Parker, but it is because Parker's body structure resembles early Peking Man. When Cynthia tells Binghamton that she could spend a lifetime with Parker, he thinks she wants to marry him. Binghamton even has a dream where the crew of the 73 live with him. Binghamton tells McHale that he is shipping Parker out to prevent him from marrying Cynthia. McHale plans to have Parker act like an ape man to get Cynthia to cancel the wedding. Cynthia explains to Binghamton that she had no intention of marrying Parker, she only wanted to study Parker's body structure.
87	15	"Fuji's Big Romance"	Charles Barton	Barry E. Blitzer	December 29, 1964	25317
Fuji is tired of always being left behind when the men go to party. They agree to take him along once. McHale reluctantly agrees. Carpenter informs Binghamton that George Gregory (John Archer), a visiting V.I.P., will soon arrive. The men bring Fuji to Chief Wabango's (Rusty Lane) luau. Fuji is introduced as Freddy and he meets the Chief's lovely daughter, Sulani. Fuji is immediately smitten with Sulani. Maloco, Sulani's jealous boyfriend, takes Sulani away. Binghamton arrives. He insults Wabango and tells McHale this area is off limits. Binghamton learns that Gregory will arrive to ensure there is a good relationship between the Navy and the natives. Binghamton needs McHale's help to smooth things over with Wabango. McHale and Fuji are giving Wabango and Sulani a ride on the 73. Binghamton invites Wabango and some of the tribe to a party with Gregory. Fuji sneaks into the party hoping to see Sulani. Binghamton is dancing with Sulani when Maloco and some of his men arrive. Maloco wants to fight Binghamton with spears. The situation worsens and Gregory is not happy.
88	16	"The Stool Parrot"	Hollingsworth Morse	Sam Locke & Joel Rapp	January 5, 1965	25318
Binghamton has forbidden fraternization with the female personnel of the base. Nurse Molly stops nurses Judy (Maura McGiveney), Debby (Julie Gregg) and Sue (Linda Foster) from talking to McHale's crew. The men have a new mascot, Sam the parrot. It has been weeks since the men have talked to a woman and they are miserable. McHale and the men find a secret hideaway where they can bend the rules a bit with the nurses. Binghamton discovers the men's parrot and hopes to get information from it. Later, Binghamton checks the parrot again and he now believes McHale and the crew are dealing with the Japanese. Binghamton finds a map with the hideaway's location and thinks McHale is meeting the enemy there that night. Binghamton brings Admiral Rogers over to help arrest McHale and his men for treason. The crew and the nurses start to party. Fuji informs them about Binghamton and the Admiral. McHale and the men and women plan to cover themselves and it involves a first aid class.
89	17	"The PT 73 Follies"	Sidney Miller	Sam Locke & Joel Rapp	January 12, 1965	25321
The crew is rehearsing for a Navy talent show in New Caledonia. The new Com-Fleet Training Officer, Capt. Cummings (Frank Gerstle), arrives to see Binghamton. Cummings says that Parker and Binghamton are to go to a deserted island for their mandatory 48-hour survival test. Before leaving, Binghamton is caught with much food hidden in his jacket. On the island, using a fire to dry their wet uniforms, Parker burns them. A Japanese patrol captures Parker and Binghamton. Binghamton tries to convince Lt. Sakawa (Mako) that they are not servicemen. McHale and the crew, on their way to New Caledonia, visit the island to check on Binghamton and Parker and are captured. McHale tells Sakawa that they are actually a traveling USO troop. They then utilize their various talents to put on a show. While entertaining the Japanese, McHale is able to broadcast a radio Mayday message. The men are rescued and the Japanese captured.
90	18	"The Truth Hurts"	Hollingsworth Morse	Henry Garson	January 19, 1965	25315
Binghamton wants to bring Dr. Halifert (John Hubbard) to McHale's island in an effort to prove the crew is suffering from battle fatigue. Before they get there, Nurse Molly tips McHale off. When Dr. Halifert arrives, he finds the crew acting perfectly normal. Because of something Halifert left behind, Binghamton lures the boys into the hospital under false pretenses, and has them injected with sodium pentothal or "truth serum". This causes them to tell him everything he wants to know and he has it on tape. Binghamton buries the evidence. He calls Admiral Rogers, who will visit the next day. Binghamton arrests the men and tells McHale everything that they said. Molly tells McHale about the truth serum. Rogers arrives early. It takes some doing, but Binghamton is injected with the truth serum. After the serum takes effect, Binghamton insults Rogers. Just then Halifert arrives and believes Binghamton is suffering from battle fatigue. Linda Foster as Nurse.
91	19	"The Late Captain Binghamton"	Charles Barton	Barry E. Blitzer	January 26, 1965	25313
Binghamton catches the boys up to their usual pranks and threatens to demote all of them. Binghamton has his annual physical exam. The men see an opportunity to alter his X-rays to make it appear he is dying making him temporarily sidelined. Virgil is able to do this by flirting with the Nurse (Julie Gregg) who is processing the X-rays. Doctor Sweetzer (Henry Hunter) tells Binghamton he has 48 hours to live. The plan backfires when, in an effort to die a hero, Binghamton volunteers to lead the 73 crew on a dangerous mission to destroy an enemy fuel dump. When Binghamton finally learns that the x-rays were manipulated, it is too late. Admiral Rogers calls and thanks Binghamton for going on the raid. On the way there, a Japanese ship almost spots them. Once on the island, Binghamton and Parker become separated from the others and are captured. McHale and the men destroy the fuel dump and rescue Binghamton and Parker. John Fujioka as Japanese Lieutenant.
92	20	"McHale's Floating Laundromat"	Hollingsworth Morse	Allan Manings	February 2, 1965	25320
In an effort to gather evidence of any wrongdoing, Binghamton makes Carpenter the 73's new Executive Officer. He makes Parker the base's Maintenance Officer. Parker messes up right away so Binghamton assigns him to laundry duty. After Parker destroys the base laundry, McHale brings all the clothes to the 73. They drag the clothes behind the moving boat, cleaning them. Carpenter catches Parker with some of the base laundry and wants to report it to Binghamton. With Fuji's help, the men make Carpenter think he has been captured. Binghamton brings Admiral Rafferty (Philip Ober) to McHale's island to prove that McHale is collaborating with the enemy. McHale plans to make it appear that Parker is leading an offensive against a Japanese attack on the island. The Admiral is so impressed that he insists Parker be returned to the 73.
93	21	"All Chiefs and No Indians"	Jean Yarbrough	Ralph Goodman & Stan Dreben	February 9, 1965	25323
Binghamton receives a directive from Admiral Hardesy (John Zaremba) that all Chief Petty Officers are to be shipped out. Binghamton plans to have the 73 crew take the exam for CPO. McHale thinks it is strange that the men are studying the Naval manual. McHale discovers Binghamton's plan. The men intentionally try to fail the test. Binghamton fixes the results to see that all of them pass. McHale tries to tell Admiral Hardesy what Binghamton did, but the Admiral ignores him. Now without a crew, the 73 is to be scrapped, and McHale and Parker are to be reassigned. Wanting to keep the 73 in business, Parker pursues a submarine with it. Fuji informs McHale what Parker did. He and the crew take off in the Admiral's boat. McHale radio's Parker and tells him to return to base, but Parker refuses to. The submarine fires at the 73. Parker does manage to sink the sub. Parker also accidentally torpedoes the Admiral's boat. Hardesy does not mind that his boat was hit as long as the sub was destroyed. As a goodwill gesture to McHale, he also removes the crew's CPO status.
94	22	"Pumpkin Takes Over"	Hollingsworth Morse	Ray Brenner & Barry E. Blitzer	February 16, 1965	25322
Nurse Suzie Clayton (Yvonne Craig) has agreed to join the show that the crew of the 73 is planning if Binghamton approves. After Suzie flirts with him, Binghamton agrees to the show. Then his wife Martha (Ann Doran), who planned to visit the base as part of the Women's Navy League tour, arrives. Martha can only stay a couple hours. Binghamton, who was to escort Suzie to the shindig, now cancels the show. Martha invites Admiral Rogers to a reception at the Officers Club. She wants to get her husband a promotion. Binghamton needs McHale's help to prevent Martha from seeing Rogers. Suzie tries to talk Binghamton into putting the show back on. Rogers arrives and mistakes pretty young Suzie for Binghamton's wife. McHale and Parker strive to keep the situation a secret from Martha. Gruber and the men put on the show because all the soldiers came anyway. Martha becomes involved and leads a sing-a-long. McHale must get Martha out of the building when he learns Rogers and Suzie will arrive. Suzie will dance for the men. Rogers receives a message and has to leave. Parker screws up and puts Martha on a same plane with Rogers. Clay Tanner as 2nd Marine.
95	23	"The Seven Faces of Ensign Parker"	Charles Barton	William Raynor & Myles Wilder	February 23, 1965	25328
The men have swiped Binghamton's dictation machine to make money selling soldiers war recordings they can send home. Parker is blamed for the crime when Binghamton catches him trying to return it. He is put in the brig, pending Court Martial. Binghamton tells McHale that he has sent for Admiral Chester Beedy, the Chief Legal Officer, to precide over the hearing. McHale schemes to make Binghamton think he is losing his mind and then drop the charges. They will try to make the Captain think he sees Parker everywhere he goes. While McHale distracts Carpenter, the men free Parker from the brig. Binghamton sees Parker all around the base: his office, the barber shop, in Parker's cell and in the hospital as a nurse. They even have Parker pose as psychiatrist Dr. Klinekramer. Binghamton is going to cancel the Court Martial, but then he sees through Parker's disguise. It does not help that Admiral Beedy actually resembles Parker. Gary Owens as 1st Sailor.
96	24	"The Return of Maggie"	Charles Barton	Tom Waldman & Frank Waldman	March 2, 1965	25326
Admiral Slocum (Bill Quinn) calls Binghamton and orders him to close Maggie Monohan's (Jean Willes) tea room in New Caledonia. It is a front for gambling. Slocum also says that if there are any Navy personnel there, to throw the book at them. Knowing that Maggie is an old friend of McHale's, Binghamton schemes to have McHale and his crew caught with her. McHale becomes suspicious when Binghamton grants the crew leave to New Caledonia. While there, the men run into Maggie and she takes them to her place. McHale realizes Binghamton's plan and tries to remove his men from there. Just then Binghamton and Carpenter raid the place and arrest McHale and his men. Binghamton calls for the Admiral. But, McHale and Maggie collaborate to keep the men out of trouble, counting on Binghamton's greed. Binghamton is on a staged winning streak and Slocum arrives. McHale and the men are off the hook, but Binghamton is assigned to the bottom of the promotion list. Maggie's place is closed and she is sent to Australia. Richard Alexander as Gambler.
97	25	"Send This Ensign to Camp"	Hollingsworth Morse	Sam Locke & Joel Rapp	March 9, 1965	25327
Binghamton dreams that he has McHale and Parker in front of a firing squad consisting of the 73 crew. When Binghamton orders fire, the men cannot do it. Binghamton is woken up when Parker pours water on him because Binghamton kept yelling fire in his sleep. Later, Parker is struck on the head during a Japanese raid and develops regressive amnesia and thinks he has returned to his childhood days at summer camp. McHale consults with Nurse Molly who says they need to play along with Parker until he recovers. Binghamton arrives, but McHale has an excuse for why Parker is acting the way he is. Parker sneaks over to mainside where Binghamton finds him. Realizing that Parker has amnesia, Binghamton wants to bring him before Fleet Medical Officer Moran (Nelson Olmsted). Binghamton hopes to lose Parker in a medical discharge. To make Parker return with them, the men dress as Indians. Before they can leave, Binghamton arrives with Moran. Just then the Japanese shell the base and Parker is hit in the head again, bringing him back to normal. But, this time Binghamton is also hit in the head and thinks he is someone else. Moran is about to take Binghamton away when Parker accidentally hits him in the head, returning him to normal.
98	26	"By the Numbers, Paint"	Hollingsworth Morse	Sam Locke & Joel Rapp	March 16, 1965	TBA
A letter from home tells Christy he needs to send $300 for a tonsillectomy for his little girl. McHale goes to ask Binghamton for an advance on the men's pay. Gruber schemes to pass off a paint-by-numbers portrait as a genuine Gauguin. Binghamton tells McHale that his men are restricted to their island because Senator Duncan (J. Edward McKinley) is in the area. Binghamton thinks McHale is making up the story about the tonsillectomy and refuses to give him the money. Believing it to be real, Binghamton wants to buy the Gauguin painting. The paint is still wet, so he knows it is a fake. But McHale advises him that Paul Gauguin's brother Claude painted it. Binghamton wants proof. Parker poses as Claude Gauguin. Binghamton will only buy the first painting if Claude paints Binghamton's portrait. While Parker stalls Binghamton, McHale has Fuji paint the portrait. Fuji's painting does not turn out. Binghamton discovers Claude is really Parker. Senator Duncan arrives and he believes that Parker is Claude Gauguin. The men receive the $300 for Christy. Clay Tanner as Marine.
99	27	"Chuckie Cottontail"	Hollingsworth Morse	Story by : William Raynor & Myles Wilder and Scott Hunt & Bill Stowell & Beth Keele; Teleplay by : William Raynor & Myles Wilder	March 23, 1965	TBA
The native school children are all sad. Sulani, their teacher and Fuji's girlfriend, tells McHale, Parker and Fuji there will not be an Easter egg hunt this year. Admiral Hardesy has a shipment of real eggs sent to Taratupa for the Easter Holidays. Binghamton has to protect the eggs until the Admiral can get to the base for the pick-up. Binghamton takes two of the eggs for himself. The crew of the 73 steal the eggs to make some moonshine eggnog to sell. After hearing about the eggs from Fuji, Sulani tells the children the egg hunt is on. McHale reluctantly agrees to let the children have the eggs. On Easter and the children are having their egg hunt. Parker is dressed as the Easter Bunny. While searching McHale's island for the stolen eggs, Binghamton, Carpenter, and Hardesy run into Parker. Parker lets it slip that the eggs are at the Native village. Binghamton, Carpenter, and Hardesy head to the village and are captured by Japanese soldiers, drunk on the eggnog. Parker frightens the Japanese, who then surrender to McHale and the men. Hardesy understands when he learns what his eggs were used for. Rollin Moriyama and Mako as the Japanese.
100	28	"The Great Necklace Caper"	Sidney Miller	Barry E. Blitzer & Ray Brenner	March 30, 1965	TBA
Parker dreams that he is a secret agent and Binghamton is an evil scientist who wants to blow up the world. Binghamton bought a jade necklace for $1000 from an Air Force Officer for his wife's birthday. He tells Carpenter that he borrowed the money from friends. An island chimp goes through Binghamton's window and takes the necklace. When Binghamton finds the necklace gone, he questions McHale and his men. Binghamton panics when he learns that Naval Intelligence is on its way to investigate. He worries that they will discover that he "borrowed" the money from the Officer's Club. McHale is also worried about Naval Intelligence coming because of Fuji. The men search for the necklace. Lt. Nurse Edith Crawford (Jeanne Bal) arrives and tells Binghamton she has been assigned to the base hospital. After the necklace turns up, Binghamton tries to frame McHale and his men with the crime in order to cover his tracks. Binghamton enlists Edith to help him. Binghamton's plan backfires when he learns that Lt. Crawford is actually from Naval Intelligence. Edith plans to arrest Binghamton for fraud. The Intelligence Board drops Binghamton's name to the bottom of the promotion list.
101	29	"Will the Real Admiral Please Stand Up?"	Hollingsworth Morse	Sam Locke & Joel Rapp	April 6, 1965	TBA
The crew of the 73 is in New Caledonia as the Navy wants an oil treaty signed with the Shah of Durani (Stanley Adams). The men are to be restricted to the boat, but they trick Parker and leave. Parker unknowingly saves the life of the Shah's daughter, Karema (Brenda Benet), from a purse snatcher. Binghamton and McHale meet with the Shah. The Shah refuses to sign any treaty unless an Admiral is present. Karema and Parker arrive. When Karema tells her father what Parker did, the Shah insists he be promoted to Admiral. McHale calls Admiral Rogers, who agrees to temporarily promote Parker just until the treaty is signed. The Shah's Major Domo (Ivan Bonar) informs Binghamton that the Shah was called away. He will sign the treaty in 48 hours on Taratupa. Parker takes full advantage of his new rank. Binghamton issues an order to arrest a person impersonating an Admiral. Admiral Rogers is mistakenly arrested. Gruber, Tinker and Binghamton pose as Admirals when Parker goes missing. Then Parker arrives. When Admiral Rogers arrives dressed in a prisoner uniform, a fast-thinking McHale straightens everything out.
102	30	"Hello, McHale? Colonna!"	Sidney Miller	William Raynor & Myles Wilder	April 13, 1965	TBA
McHale and the men run into Jerry Colonna in New Caledonia. They talk the bug-eyed, mustachioed comic into making an unscheduled stop for a show on Taratupa. A medical Admiral, Henshaw (Tyler McVey), calls Binghamton. Henshaw is investigating irregularities at base hospitals. He wants to see Taratupa's medical records. McHale learns that the base does not qualify for a Special Services show because it has fewer than fifty hospital beds. Colonna cannot come. McHale schemes to get more beds and more patients. After Henshaw reads the records, he believes that some of the men at Taratupa are faking sickness. McHale starts to fill the hospital. Binghamton orders Carpenter to have the hospital cleared. McHale causes Carpenter to think he is sick and he goes to the hospital. The men fill the hospital again. Henshaw arrives for a surprise inspection. McHale has to explain why they were trying to fill the beds. Henshaw thinks that McHale is inventing the Colonna story, but then Colonna arrives.
103	31	"Rumble on Taratupa"	Earl Bellamy	Stan Dreben & Ralph Goodman	April 20, 1965	TBA
While trying to sell their moonshine, Gruber and the men learn that some Air-corp men are under-pricing them. The men confront Sgt. Callahan of the Air-Corp and this leads to a fight. Capt. Shepard (Robert F. Simon), the Fleet Legal Officer, tells Binghamton that he cannot prosecute McHale's men for bootlegging without proof. Carpenter tells Binghamton that he found bottles of booze and a still in an abandoned ammo shack. Meanwhile, McHale tells his men that their bootlegging days are over and he begins to destroy the bottles. Binghamton is disappointed when he catches Callahan with moonshine instead of McHale. Binghamton then tries to frame the 73 crew and has them thrown into the brig until Shepard arrives. Shepard will bring Dr. Moran (Nelson Olmsted), the psychiatrist, with to check on Binghamton. With Fuji's help, McHale and the men escape from jail. Now they have to get Binghamton's phony evidence. They create a scheme involving "McHale's Mob". They dress up as gangsters and frighten Binghamton into giving them the evidence. Shepard and Moran arrive and Binghamton tells them about the gangsters. When they find McHale and the men back in the brig, Shepard and Moran think Binghamton is going crazy. Clay Tanner as Marine Guard.
104	32	"All Ahead, Empty"	Hollingsworth Morse	Story by : John Wright & William C. Jackson; Teleplay by : Allan Manings	April 27, 1965	TBA
Ensign Eugene Kwazniak (Marvin Kaplan), an MIT-trained electronics wizard, arrives at the base to convert a PT boat into a fully automated, remote-controlled vessel. Binghamton immediately thinks of the 73. McHale does not know what Kwazniak is doing in the 73 and a Guard (Sammy Shore) will not let him aboard. Binghamton tells Kwazniak that Adm. Hardesy will arrive tomorrow to test the boat. Tinker dresses as a nurse to distract the Guard. McHale and the men befriend Kwazniak and learn what he is doing to the boat. Kwazniak demonstrates how it works, unaware that Binghamton and Parker are on the boat. McHale and the crew fear that they may soon become obsolete and be transferred. The only hope for the men is if they can jam the radio frequency on the day of the test. If they can convince Hardesy that the boat is uncontrollable, they can save their positions. Willy is unable to get to the jamming radio, so it looks hopeless for the crew. The test begins well, but worsens with help from an unlikely source, the Japanese.
105	33	"The Vampire of Taratupa"	Hollingsworth Morse	William Raynor & Myles Wilder	May 4, 1965	TBA
McHale and Parker meet a new nurse named Lt. Melba Benson (Ann Elder). She is clumsy and she seems to like Parker. After a movie date with Melba, Parker causes an accident that angers Binghamton. Binghamton assigns Parker to coast-watching duty in a hazardous location. But he changes his mind when Nurse Molly informs him that Parker is the only source of his rare blood type in the South Pacific. Binghamton now wants Parker protected. He even takes him away from the 73 and places him at his residence to safeguard him. Parker takes advantage of the situation and has Binghamton pamper him. The men discover that Melba fabricated the blood samples so that Parker would not be sent away. The men must now find a way for Binghamton to not want Parker around without letting him know about the deception. They try to get Binghamton to believe that Parker is a vampire and he has several monstrous friends. Binghamton realizes what they are doing, but he now wants Parker out of his sight.
106	34	"Birth of a Salesman"	Jean Yarbrough	Sam Locke & Joel Rapp	May 11, 1965	TBA
Binghamton is upset about losing his civilian job after the war. He dreams that McHale and the men are all successful businessmen. He is just an elevator operator. Carpenter awakens him and tells him that a Lieutenant Whitworth (Steve Franken) has been assigned to the base. Whitworth is in charge of the largest life insurance company on the mainland. Binghamton tries to impress Whitworth so he can become a salesman after the war. Whitworth tells Binghamton that if he can sell a policy to all the 73 crew then he will hire him as an agent. McHale is surprised when Binghamton gives the men a large advance on their salaries. McHale learns from Carpenter about Whitworth's offer to Binghamton. McHale says they are not interested in insurance policies. McHale plans to buy the policies but put Parker's name on as the agent. Binghamton sends the 73 on a long mission and then he will change the agent's name to his. McHale wants to make it look as though the crew was killed and then Whitworth would have to pay off the policies. Binghamton would surely tell Whitworth that Parker actually sold them. Binghamton dreams that he is a partner in Whitworth's company. After getting a radio signal from McHale, Binghamton believes the boat has been sunk. It takes some doing, but McHale proves that Binghamton did not sell any policies. Whitworth offers McHale and the crew jobs, but not Binghamton.
107	35	"A Star Falls on Taratupa"	Hollingsworth Morse	Ray Brenner & Barry E. Blitzer	May 18, 1965	TBA
Glamorous movie star Mimi St. Clair (Jean Hale) is upset because other actresses are getting more publicity than her. Her secretary Frances (Fay DeWitt) shows her a letter from Gruber and the men. They had asked for 200 pictures of her. Mimi decides to go to Taratupa with a plan to create some publicity for herself. The men are actually faking her signature and selling the pictures. Admiral Rogers calls Binghamton to inform him that Mimi St. Clair will visit Taratupa. After she arrives, Binghamton is upset that Mimi is there to see the crew of the 73. Binghamton had plans to take her to com-fleet and introduce her to Admiral Rogers. So Binghamton sends McHale on an imaginary mission. Mimi has her chance to make the headlines and stows away on the 73. After learning what Mimi did, Binghamton, Rogers and Frances search for her. McHale finds Mimi on the boat and just then the Japanese shell the island. But it does not go as Mimi had planned. Secretary Frances winds up grabbing all the headlines for taking a boat ride with Admiral Rogers. Gary Owens as Reporter.
108	36	"Make Room for Orvie"	Jean Yarbrough	John Fenton Murray	June 1, 1965	TBA
The 73 crew have a new pet, Shorty the Chimp. Shorty accidentally fires a gun in the direction of Binghamton. Binghamton meets Orvie Tuttle (Michael Burns), a new young sailor who has been assigned to the 73. Binghamton decides to have Orvie spy on McHale. The men go to a luau and leave Parker to watch over Orvie. Orvie sees the native girls and other suspicious things. He tries to radio Binghamton, but Parker arrives. Binghamton and Carpenter visit McHale's island to see Orvie. Parker thinks they are Japanese and fires on their boat. McHale is about to tell Orvie about Fuji when Shorty starts up the 73 and sails off with it. Admiral Rogers calls Binghamton and tells him there is a Japanese sub in the area. Rogers wants the 73 to go looking for it. Shorty manages to fire a torpedo and he sinks the sub. Parker is trying to radio Shorty and the men think the 73 has been sunk. The men catch Orvie trying to call Binghamton. Orvie explains that Binghamton ordered him to spy on them. Shorty bring the 73 back safe and sound. Admiral Rogers congratulates McHale and the men for sinking the sub.

=== Season 4 (1965–66) ===
No. overall	No. in season	Title	Directed by	Written by	Original release date
109	1	"War, Italian Style"	Hollingsworth Morse	Frank Gill, Jr. & George Carleton Brown	September 14, 1965
McHale, the 73 crew, Captain Binghamton, and Lieutenant Carpenter have all been transferred to a base in the little coastal town of Voltafiore, Italy. They soon find themselves dealing with the town's crooked, money-hungry Mayor Mario Lugatto (Jay Novello) and his assistant Dino Baroni (Dick Wilson). When McHale and Parker enter Binghamton's office, the door hits Lugatto. He now claims to have whiplash. Lugatto then creates an accident when the 73 reaches the dock where a vegetable dock is destroyed. He wants Binghamton to pay for it. McHale discovers that Fuji stowed away on the 73. Binghamton tells McHale that the crew will pay for the dock. During an air raid, the crew discover an abandoned wine cellar filled with pillaged artwork. There is also a ledger listing all of Lugatto's crooked schemes. Just then Lugatto and Dino enter. McHale threatens to show the ledger to Binghamton unless Lugatto forgives their debt for the dock. Lugatto sees Fuji. The Mayor believes he will receive an cash award from Binghamton by turning in the Japanese spy. McHale and the men manage to convince Binghamton that Fuji is an American soldier with the help of a Nisei Sergeant. The Sergeant takes Fuji away to find his unit. But the Sergeant is Fuji's second cousin and lets Fuji return to the men.
110	2	"The Bathtub Thief"	Hollingsworth Morse	John Fenton Murray	September 21, 1965
Virgil tells the men that the GI's are setting up a shower unit. McHale reminds them that it is 20 miles away and Binghamton has restricted them to the base. In his office, Binghamton is in the middle of a bubble-bath in a tub that he confiscated as a spoil of war. McHale arrives and asks if the men could go to the shower unit, but Binghamton denies permission. After some mishap, the tub rolls into the street and right against Colonel Harrigan's (Henry Beckman joins the cast as recurring character) jeep. Now Harrigan wants the spoil of war and he confiscates Binghamton's tub. The men are on the 73 heading to the shower unit. German planes attack and the 73's fuel line is damaged. They make it to land. McHale, Parker, Gruber, and Tinker search for something to repair the boat with. Meanwhile, Binghamton steals it back his tub. A German patrol traps McHale and the men behind enemy lines. They masquerade as an Italian family in order to save themselves. Binghamton and Carpenter get lost returning the tub back to base. They wind up at the house where McHale and the Germans are and are captured. McHale finds a way to capture the Germans. Ron Soble as German Sergeant.
111	3	"Marriage, McHale Style"	Hollingsworth Morse	Ralph Goodman & Bruce Howard	September 28, 1965
Binghamton angers the local Italians after he forbids their fraternization with Naval personnel. Local girl Gina Giovanni (Victoria Vetri) wants to marry her sweetheart, Vittorio. He happens to be an Italian soldier and will soon be sent to a prison camp. After Mayor Lugatto and Mama Giovanni (Peggy Mondo) beg him, McHale reluctantly agrees to marry them. But McHale can only perform the wedding on the boat. McHale wants to keep the wedding a secret. He is unaware that Lugatto invited the entire village. Meanwhile, Binghamton learns that Under Secretary of State Gilbert will arrive that day. Binghamton panics because he knows the villagers hate him because of his order. McHale thinks few people will attend, but the entire town wants to board the 73. Binghamton must quickly make amends with the villagers in order to please the General and Gilbert, who has just arrived. So he allows McHale and the townsfolk to throw the big wedding bash.
112	4	"Giuseppe McHale"	Hollingsworth Morse	Hugh Wedlock, Jr. & Allan Manings	October 5, 1965
Binghamton unsuccessfully tries to get McHale and his men in trouble with Colonel Harrigan. Christy has been arrested by Binghamton and confined in the brig. McHale says he will discuss the incident with Harrigan. The problem is that McHale is restricted to base and leaving could result in an AWOL charge. But he goes hoping to get Christy off. During his absence McHale's Italian cousin Giuseppe (Ernest Borgnine in a dual role), who resembles his American counterpart, arrives. It takes a little while for Parker and the men to realize that it is not McHale with a disguise. At first they hide Giuseppe from Binghamton. But then the crew will let Giuseppe stand in for McHale when Binghamton searches for him. It will be difficult since the cousin can speak no English. When Giuseppe speaks Italian, the men try to convince Binghamton that McHale is suffering from battle fatigue. Binghamton takes Giuseppe with him and plans to send McHale back to the States. Gruber frees Giuseppe before he is put on the hospital ship. Meanwhile, McHale gets Harrigan to drop the charges against Christy. Harrigan also thinks Binghamton needs a rest when Binghamton tries to tell him about McHale's battle fatigue. Joyce Nizzari as The 1st Girl.
113	5	"A Nip in Time"	Hollingsworth Morse	Sam Locke & Joel Rapp	October 12, 1965
The men complain that they have not been paid since they left the Pacific. Carpenter shows Binghamton some German war souvenirs he got when the enemy left San Marcello. After Binghamton confiscates them from Carpenter, Colonel Harrigan confiscates them from him. Harrigan says that San Marcello is off limits. Gruber and the men realize that there is money to be made in the lucrative German war souvenir market. McHale, Parker and Fuji seek the men when they learn they went to San Marcello. The Motor Pool Sgt. (Bart Burns) tells Binghamton that Gruber took a truck to San Marcello. Harrigan also went there to find souvenirs. A German patrol captures McHale, Harrigan and the men. Parker learns what happened. Fuji dresses up as a Japanese Admiral and Parker as his Japanese Ensign. With their help, McHale and the men capture the Germans. Back at the base, Binghamton wants to arrest McHale and his men. Harrigan tells Binghamton to give them a commendation instead. James Frawley as German Noncom.
114	6	"Piazza Binghamtoni"	Hollingsworth Morse	William Raynor & Myles Wilder	October 19, 1965
Binghamton closes the town to all military personnel after Parker accidentally assaults him. With the town closed and Parker in the brig, McHale and Mayor Lugatto have to find a way to make Binghamton reopen the town and release Parker. They tell glory-hungry Binghamton that the town had planned to erect a statue of him in the main square as "The Great Liberator". Lugatto says his cousin Angelo Barone (Ralph Manza) is a sculptor. But none of this can happen now that the town is shuttered. Binghamton daydreams that he is famous and his picture is everywhere. He even appears on Mt. Rushmore. Binghamton now opens the town, but Parker remains in jail. Angelo begins to work on Binghamton's statue. Binghamton notifies Admiral Laurence (John Gallaudet) that the town will unveil a statue of their Navy hero. Binghamton does not identify the hero. Laurence says he will be there with the Press Corps. Laurence arrives. The statue is unveiled and it is Parker. Binghamton is forced to have Parker released when Laurence insists he address the crowd.
115	7	"The Bald-Headed Contessa"	Hollingsworth Morse	John Fenton Murray	October 26, 1965
Binghamton is preparing a dinner party for General Bronson (Simon Scott). McHale asks him if the men could have some time off as they have been on patrol for a week. Binghamton instead sends them on a twenty-mile hike. With Fuji's help, the crew reach a villa that belongs to a beautiful Contessa who fled from the area due to the war. Bronson calls Binghamton and says he will not be able to make his dinner party. The General says he will go to dinner at Col. Harrigan's. The men decide to throw a party at the villa. Carpenter informs Binghamton that there are lights on at the Contessa's estate. If he could get the Contessa to attend his dinner, it might entice Bronson to come as well. The men are having their party with some local ladies. Binghamton arrives at the villa. McHale tells him that the Contessa invited them to a party. Parker poses as the Contessa. Just then Harrigan arrives and realizes the Contessa is Parker. Everyone is surprised when Bronson arrives. Both Binghamton and Harrigan have no choice but to go along with Parker posing as the Contessa. They need to fool the General and keep everyone out of trouble. Bronson gives McHale and his men a week's leave in Naples.
116	8	"Voltafiore Fish-Fry"	Hollingsworth Morse	Ralph Goodman & Bruce Howard	November 2, 1965
General Bronson has issued orders that anyone caught profiteering will be brought up on charges. Bronson comes to see Binghamton, who claimed to have proof of McHale's illegal activities. Bronson becomes upset when Binghamton has no proof. Mayor Lugatto tells his assistant Dino Baroni that they have to go straight for a little while. Binghamton pretends to be going to a staff meeting, hoping McHale will feel free to do some profiteering. Lugatto blackmails McHale into going into the fishing business for him. With the 73 made to resemble a fishing vessel, McHale sets off to find the fish. Upon returning Binghamton is waiting for him on shore. He now has the goods on McHale and will lead him to meet with the General. On the way a German submarine bombs the town. Because the 73 looks like a fishing vessel, they are able to get close enough to sink the sub. Binghamton still wants to bring McHale up on charges. Bronson believes McHale intentionally disguised the 73 and congratulates him for his ingenuity. Bronson tells Lugatto to distribute the fish to the townspeople free of charge courtesy of the US government.
117	9	"A Wine Cellar Is Not a Home"	Hollingsworth Morse	William Raynor & Myles Wilder	November 9, 1965
McHale and the men are tired of living in a tent, especially when rain leaks in. They decide to move to the abandoned wine cellar they found earlier. That is where Fuji has been staying. It just so happens that a German cargo ship has been sunk near the coast and the crew find much luxurious furniture to furnish the place with. But first greedy Binghamton, then Harrigan, impound their furnishings for their own use. McHale's men dress up as Germans and steal the furniture from Harrigan. Harrigan believes Binghamton had something to do with the heist. Binghamton, in turn, thinks it was McHale. A friend informs Gruber that Binghamton is looking for the furniture. In order to be able to keep the furniture, the boys have to make it look as if it had been destroyed. McHale admits to Binghamton that the men took the furniture. But they did return it to Binghamton. Just then Harrigan drives up. The men stage an air raid and blow up a supply tent that had some old furniture in it, pretending it is the good stuff.
118	10	"Vino, Vino, Who's Got the Vino?"	Hollingsworth Morse	Elroy Schwartz	November 16, 1965
There is no wine in Voltafiore and Binghamton wants to get some to give to General Bronson. Mayor Lugatto tells Binghamton that the Germans took all the wine and hid it. Binghamton goes to see McHale figuring that he has some wine, but he does not. While on patrol, McHale and his crew see a German boat in a cove. After an exchange of gunfire, the Germans leave. The 73 cannot pursue them as they are low on fuel. When the crew enters the cove, they find that the Germans were trying to get cases of stolen wine off the sea floor. McHale plans to empty the bottles of wine and store the drink in barrels to give to the villagers. Then he will fill the bottles of wine with explosives and replace the cases on the bottom of the sea. Lugatto and Dino discover that McHale is placing wine cases at the bottom of the cove. Parker accidentally gets drunk. Lugatto tells Binghamton about McHale and the wine. Lugatto wants either the wine or some money. Parker drives around the village square and crashes into a building. Binghamton learns from Parker which cove has the wine and he goes to retrieve some of it. McHale proves to Binghamton that the bottles are full of explosives when one explodes in Binghamton's office. They learn that Carpenter put a case of the wine in Bronson's jeep.
119	11	"The McHale Opera Company"	Hollingsworth Morse	Ralph Goodman & Bruce Howard	November 23, 1965
Mayor Lugatto and Rosa Giovanni (Peggy Mondo) want the town's opera house back in business. Lugatto says they do not have the material to fix the place, but maybe they can get the Navy to do it. Binghamton is recording a song for his wife's anniversary and his singing is hard to take. Lugatto asks Virgil to be the lead in an opera opposite Rosa. Lugatto talks the crew into fixing up the opera house. They are caught taking building supplies and are imprisoned. Binghamton's record is destroyed, so he has to make another for his wife. McHale schemes to have Binghamton sing the lead in the opera company's season-opener, despite the Captain's clear lack of talent. Rosa tells Binghamton that he has the best voice around and asks him to sing with her. Now Binghamton will help with the supplies for the Opera House. He releases McHale's men so they can help with the repairs. Binghamton even wants to invite General Bronson to attend the event. McHale then plans to not let Binghamton be heard singing. On opening night Bronson arrives. Whenever Binghamton sings, the men play a recording of jet fighters to drown him out. After Parker breaks the record, the men cover up Binghamton's voice in funny ways. Then an actual air raid stops the production. Bronson tells Binghamton how much he enjoyed the funny show.
120	12	"The Good Luck Fountain"	Hollingsworth Morse	Henry Garson	November 30, 1965
Mayor Lugatto is running a racket in the form of a "Good Luck Fountain" in the town square. Binghamton sees the fountain and immediately shuts it down. Parker has been feeling low because he cannot get a girl. McHale wants to help Parker and will use the fountain to do it. McHale and the men learn the fountain has been turned off. Binghamton will be away for a few days at conference. With Binghamton gone, McHale gets Lugatto to reopen the fountain. Parker can now wish for a girl. After paying off Maria with nylons, she agrees to spend time with Parker. Binghamton returns after the conference is canceled. He imprisons Lugatto, pending impeachment proceedings, for reopening the fountain. To get Binghamton to free Lugatto and reopen the fountain, McHale and the men must convince him that "The Curse of Voltafiore" has befallen him. Binghamton has a couple close calls, but still does not believe in the curse. After a couple more, Binghamton releases Lugatto and opens the fountain. Believing the curse is gone, he celebrates. Something happens to Colonel Harrigan when he ridicules the fountain.
121	13	"Blitzkrieg at McHale's Beach"	Hollingsworth Morse	John Fenton Murray	December 7, 1965
McHale's men are having a beach party with some of the local ladies. Colonel Harrigan wants to take over McHale's beach for himself. He goes to Binghamton and tells him that General Bronson is to make a visit to check on the morale of the officers. If it is unsatisfactory then Binghamton will be transferred to North Africa. Binghamton is going to have to move McHale's crew into his building and pretend that the two are getting along splendidly. This will free up the beach for Harrigan. McHale and his crew do not want to be in town and are suspicious. Binghamton does not really want the crew at his residence, either. McHale decides that if the men are problematic, Binghamton will expel them. Fuji sees Harrigan on McHale's beach with some ladies. When they realize Harrigan concocted the story, McHale and the Captain, independently, think of a similar plans to retaliate. But it becomes a mess when the two plans are staged simultaneously and it involves dressing up as Germans. Things get complicated when Harrigan learns of the fake Germans and Bronson arrives. McHale invents a plausible explanation for Bronson.
122	14	"Reunion for PT 73"	Hollingsworth Morse	Sam Locke & Joel Rapp	December 14, 1965
Parker gets a tape recorder from a correspondence school. Binghamton arrives and thinks Parker stole the recorder. McHale shows him the receipt. General Williams (William Mims), the Judge Advocate, calls Binghamton. Williams questions all the accusations he has made against McHale and his men. Williams will come to base. Binghamton wants to set a trap using his safe as bait, but it fails. McHale learns about Williams. While the 73 is on a fake mission, Binghamton encounters Parker's tape recorder. It seems that Parker was recording some of the men as they discussed the big schemes they had made against Binghamton over the last few months. Binghamton now has the necessary evidence for a court-martial against the crew of the 73. But when a potted-plant hits Binghamton in the head making him woozy, McHale thinks of a plan where they can get the recorder back. The plan includes making Binghamton think the war is over and he is at a reunion of war vets. McHale sets up Rosa Giovanni's restaurant to look like it is in New York. It takes some doing, but Binghamton starts to believe the war is over. Binghamton does reveal where he hid the recorder. But when General Williams appears during the execution of the plan, the situation may worsen. McHale is able to justify what they were doing and the men are able to erase the tape. Note: Gruber holds up a newspaper saying that the Brooklyn Dodgers blew another pennant and predicted they would win in 1951, which, in real life, they did not.
123	15	"The Return of Giuseppe"	Hollingsworth Morse	Bruce Howard & Ralph Goodman	December 21, 1965
McHale's look-alike Italian cousin, Giuseppe, returns. Giuseppe bought a fishing boat and will stay in San Lucca, which is only ten miles away. Binghamton and Carpenter are in San Lucca for a meeting with General Grayson (Willis Bouchey). Grayson wanted proof of McHale's black market activities, which Binghamton did not have. McHale defies Binghamton's orders and travels to San Lucca to visit his little cousin. Binghamton sees him and hopes to nail him on a desertion charge. Binghamton then sees Giuseppe leave the building and thinks McHale changed his clothes. He also thinks the children that are there are his and that Theresa Maggiore (Penny Santon) is his wife. Theresa is actually Giuseppe's wife. Binghamton sends McHale on a fake mission, but he attends his little cousin's birthday party. But McHale manages to avoid trouble when he and Giuseppe assume each other's identities long enough to fool Binghamton and General Grayson. Note: Ernest Borgnine plays a dual role.
124	16	"The Boy Scouts of 73"	Hollingsworth Morse	Hugh Wedlock, Jr. & Allan Manings	December 28, 1965
McHale and the crew notice many of their belongings are missing, find three boys, Tonio (Gary Goetzman), Angelo (Thomas Hazlett) and Gino with the belongings. The boys also have Binghamton's gold pen. Binghamton confronts McHale about stealing his pen. Gruber was able to slip the pen into Binghamton's jacket without him knowing it. Parker tries to set the boys on the straight and narrow with some good old-fashioned Boy Scout training. The boys do not respond to Parker's methods. Parker takes the blame when the boys do something dangerous. Meanwhile, General Bronson is tired of Binghamton's false alarms and threatens to transfer him to Iceland. Wanting to do something nice for Parker, the boys steal Binghamton's clock and put it in Parker's tent. Binghamton finds the crew with his clock and arrests them. They are placed in a dungeon under city hall. The boys try to help their Scoutmaster and his crew. They extricate McHale and crew from the dungeon and then return them. A truckload of merchandise the boys stole over time is put in Binghamton's office. General Bronson thinks Binghamton is a kleptomaniac and sends for the medics.
125	17	"Fire in the Liquor Locker"	Hollingsworth Morse	William Raynor & Myles Wilder	January 4, 1966
Gruber and the men are dressed as Italians and are selling their homemade liquor to the GIs. Binghamton catches them doing it and they flee. McHale is going to Naples for an overnight conference. Binghamton did not recognize them as McHale's men, but he confiscates the liquor. General Bronson tells Binghamton he needs to form some civic improvements or he will be replaced. After McHale destroys their still, Gruber and the men build a mobile distillery in an old fire engine. Unfortunately for the crew, Binghamton confiscates the fire engine for the new Voltafiore Volunteer Fire Department. It will be part of his new civic improvement program. Binghamton will be the chief of the fire crew and place townsfolk as members. This will surely impress General Bronson. Knowing they cannot just take the fire engine, McHale hopes to drain off the booze. Before they can do it, Carpenter announces an actual fire: Bronson's jeep is on fire. McHale tries to stop him, but Binghamton hoses down the jeep. The jeep explodes. Later, the crew tells McHale that they are going straight. McHale discovers a still in the phonograph. Dick Wilson as The 4th Italian.
126	18	"The Fugitive Ensign"	Hollingsworth Morse	William Raynor & Myles Wilder	January 11, 1966
Parker has two boys leave a jeep armed with a machine gun. He accidentally fires the gun in the direction of Binghamton's office. Binghamton faints and Carpenter thinks he has been killed. Parker flees, chased by MPs. Binghamton orders a search for Parker and offers a reward for his capture. Parker sees a Gypsy (Ralph Manza) bathing in a pond and takes his clothes. The MPs capture a man they think is Parker, but it is the Gypsy in Parker's clothes. At the Gypsy camp, Parker tries to blend in. The Gypsy King recognizes Parker from a wanted poster. McHale and the crew inform Parker that Binghamton is alive, but Parker remains wanted for attempted murder. So McHale and the men blindfold Binghamton and convince him that he has been captured and is on a German submarine. They then make it appear that Parker rescues him. A grateful Binghamton drops the charges against Parker. Clay Tanner as 1st MP.
127	19	"The Wacky WAC"	Hollingsworth Morse	Bruce Howard & Brad Radnitz	January 18, 1966
An AWOL WAC Corporal named Sally Murdock (Joan Staley) wanders into McHale's base and faints. She is trying to see her sweetheart Sgt. Bob Clancy (Don Stewart) before her unit heads to North Africa. The men know Clancy because he is Colonel Harrigan's driver. Meanwhile, Harrigan believes there is a security leak in Binghamton's base. Binghamton thinks it could be McHale's men. McHale reluctantly agrees to help Sally. So McHale asks Harrigan to give a lecture at his base. But at the lecture Binghamton is spying around the camp and notices Sally in the bushes. He thinks the female is a German agent in cahoots with McHale. That is the cause the security leak and he arrests her. McHale presses onward. With Sally under arrest, he is still bound to help her before Binghamton discovers that she is AWOL. Parker must play the part of a WAC MP, as part of McHale's plan to free her and reunite her with Clancy. While Parker distracts Binghamton, the men get Sally out of the building. But then two WAC MPs (Jackie Joseph and Janice Carroll) arrive. Sally and Clancy are reunited. The WAC MPs want dates with McHale's men. Confusion ensues when Binghamton learns Sally is gone and Harrigan arrives, but everything ends well.
128	20	"La Dolce 73"	Hollingsworth Morse	Sam Locke & Joel Rapp	January 25, 1966
Binghamton enlists the help of McHale and his men to make a battle film he can send to his wife. The crew are dressed as Germans and Binghamton is fighting them off single-handedly. Parker manages to foul things up. Binghamton tells Carpenter to cancel the cast party. Harrigan informs Binghamton that Congresswoman Adele Austin (Elvia Allman) will visit Voltafiore and everything should be in order. Miss Austin is looking to make sure that the US Armed Forces are conducting themselves with dignity in the theater of Europe. Binghamton devises a scheme to make McHale and the 73 crew look bad in the eyes of the Congresswoman. If Binghamton can film McHale and his crew in a drunken cast party, he will be able to get rid of them. The party is underway with women and plenty to drink. Harrigan calls Binghamton to tell him that Adele has to return to D.C. the next day so she will not visit Voltafiore. Binghamton still has Carpenter film the party. But thanks to McHale and his crew, the Congresswoman's film has been manipulated to only show Binghamton. Not knowing about the change in the film, Carpenter sends it to Miss Austin. Binghamton must then cooperate with them in order to extricate himself from a difficult situation with the Congresswoman. They convince Adele that the film was a training film about the vices service men must be wary of in a foreign country. Adele agrees to be in the film and the crew is able to retaliate against Harrigan.
129	21	"McHale's Country Club Caper"	Hollingsworth Morse	Ralph Goodman	February 8, 1966
Con-artist Guido Panzini (Pat Harrington Jr.) manages to get money from Parker. With the 73 being repaired, McHale hopes to get leave for his men. Meanwhile, Binghamton is trying to build a work-out area for the men to impress General Bronson. But when Colonel Harrigan confiscates the equipment it looks like Harrigan is the one who will impress the General. Binghamton decides to now build the General a golf course. Panzini happens to overhear Binghamton. For the small fee of $1000, Guido will build him one that will really impress the General. Binghamton pays Panzini the amount from the Naval recreation fund. Binghamton wants McHale and his men to do much of the labor. Thanks to McHale, Binghamton learns that Guido is a con-artist. But by then Guido has already fled the area with the money. Harrigan heard about the golf course and the $1000 and will inspect it. Binghamton enlists the aid of McHale and the 73 crew in exchange for the leave McHale requested. The crew set up a mock golf course and Harrigan arrives. Harrigan wants to confiscate the course and agrees to reimburse the $1000. Things become complicated when Carpenter shows up with Panzini. Harrigan is made a fool of when Bronson arrives and finds the golf course has only one hole. Buck Kartalian as The Waiter.
130	22	"Secret Chimp 007"	Hollingsworth Morse	Elroy Schwartz	February 15, 1966
Binghamton learns from General Bronson that there are German spies operating in the area. A Courier (Kent McCord (credited as Kent McWhirter)) drops off some secret papers sent from Bronson. When Binghamton is not looking, a chimp takes them. The chimp makes his way to McHale's camp, also taking papers from there. Parker thinks a spy took the papers, but McHale thinks the men just misplaced them. Parker decides to look for the spy. Meanwhile, the chimp brings the papers back to his Gypsy owner. The Gypsy wants watches and wallets, not papers, and sends the chimp back out. Binghamton sets up the thief by placing another letter on his desk. Sure enough, the chimp returns and Binghamton decides to follow the chimp. While looking for the spy, Parker finds the Gypsy's camp and the missing papers. Then the chimp shows up. Binghamton and Carpenter find Parker and the chimp. Binghamton arrests Parker for espionage. Back at his office, the chimp grabs the secret orders again and leaves. McHale and the crew find the Gypsy and the chimp with the orders. Binghamton arrives and arrests McHale and the Gypsy. Binghamton then follows the orders on the papers that sends all PT boats into a dangerous situation. Bronson arrives and they realize that the orders were sent by the German spies.
131	23	"36-24-73"	Hollingsworth Morse	Sam Locke & Joel Rapp	February 22, 1966
Admiral Ennis (Bill Quinn) brings Ensign Sandra Collins (Maura McGiveney) to be Binghamton's new secretary. Meanwhile, Parker damages a local's boat and now the crew has to get the money to replace it or it will be reported to Binghamton. McHale's crew wants to put on a beauty show for the army men to raise the money. With the tickets sold, local women ready and the food mysteriously requisitioned, everything is set. Regulation-quoting Sandra discovers strange requisitions from McHale's crew. After she reports it to Binghamton, they leave and seize the food and Binghamton cancels the beauty show. Despite being restricted to their base, McHale and some of the men go into town to talk to Sandra. Virgil tries to sweet-talk Sandra, but she sends him away. Parker goes to confront her, but they develop a mutual attraction. Sandra feels bad for causing the show's cancellation. She talks with the crew and schemes to have the show without violating any code of misconduct by having WAVs instead of civilians. They take the 73, without McHale knowing, to transport the WAVs. Binghamton wants to know why McHale and the crew are not hunting a German submarine. The 73 comes to shore with the WAVs in their bathing suits. Admiral Ennis arrives and says that the German sub ran aground not far away and they captured it. McHale explains that they used the WAVs to distract the sub, causing it to run aground. McHale asks Ennis to be the judge for the beauty show and he accepts.
132	24	"My Son, the Skipper"	Hollingsworth Morse	Bruce Howard & Brad Radnitz	March 1, 1966
The 73 crew celebrates their fourth year together. Binghamton leads the crew to believe McHale is being transferred. In reality, McHale has gone to a two-week refresher course. Binghamton promotes Parker to skipper of the PT 73 but only if he is rough and tough enough to handle the job. Binghamton hopes the crew will get so sick of Parker that they will all put in for transfers. Power goes to Parker's head and he works the crew like dogs. When they learn that Parker volunteered them for a suicide mission, the crew all put in for transfers. Binghamton then demotes Parker back to ensign and tells him to transfer. Carpenter lets it slip that McHale is returning. Parker realizes Binghamton's plan and tells the crew. Gruber plans to go on the suicide mission and take Binghamton with. With Fuji's help, the crew feign being pinned down by German gunfire. The men pretend to have been killed. Parker pretends he has been hit and gets Binghamton to tear up the transfer papers.
133	25	"Little Red Riding Doctor"	Hollingsworth Morse	John Fenton Murray	March 8, 1966
The town is in the midst of its 500th anniversary celebration. There is a "King of the Festival" contest between Binghamton and McHale, with McHale crowned the winner, infuriating Binghamton. He hopes to have Lt. Pratt (Don Knotts), a visiting psychiatrist, declare the 73 crew unfit for duty. Binghamton arranges for Pratt to return in a few days. Binghamton then sends the 73 crew on all-night missions to exhaust them. Despite their exhaustion, Pratt finds nothing wrong with them. But with the crew set to perform a 'Red Riding Hood' play at the festival in town, Binghamton again calls Pratt to view the crew in their costumes. Believing that Pratt is with Special Services and might send the crew on a tour of Italy, they put on a show for him. Knowing nothing of the festival, Pratt declares that the men have battle fatigue and is sending them to the hospital ship that sails in a few hours. Pratt tells Binghamton that he has alerted Colonel Wilcox (Nelson Olmsted), the Chief Psychiatrist, about the men. Fuji learns what happened and tells McHale. McHale enlists the help of the townspeople and the Assistant Mayor, Dino Baroni, to make Binghamton the "King of the Festival". Wilcox arrives and sees Binghamton wearing a crown and a king's robe. Pratt is dressed as Red Riding Hood and the crew are back in their uniforms. Wilcox takes Binghamton and Pratt away.
134	26	"Who Was That German I Saw You With?"	Hollingsworth Morse	John Fenton Murray	March 15, 1966
Carpenter tells Binghamton that photographer Pete Morgan (Herb Vigran) from Globe Magazine is set to visit the base. Morgan will visit to do a layout on McHale and his crew. Binghamton wants his picture on the front page instead of McHale's, so he sends the 73 on a mission. McHale has Parker wait for Morgan. The crew will pretend to go on the mission and then meet up with Parker and Morgan. Binghamton learns that McHale disobeyed his order. Meanwhile, some German soldiers approach McHale's tents. The Germans put on sailor uniforms. When Binghamton reaches the tents, the Germans take him hostage. The German Sergeant (James Frawley) wants Binghamton's jeep. Fuji witnesses all of this. The jeep runs out of gas. While on his way to meet Morgan, the Germans capture Parker. Unable find Parker, McHale and the men return to their base. Fuji tells them about Binghamton's capture. Carpenter is with Morgan in town. Binghamton, Parker and the Germans push the jeep into town's square. Carpenter and Morgan see them. McHale and his men arrive. They pretend to be intoxicated and capture the Germans. The crew will be pictured on the cover of the magazine.
135	27	"The McHale Grand Prix"	Hollingsworth Morse	Story by : Jerry Mayer; Teleplay by : Ralph Goodman	March 22, 1966
Col. Harrigan tells Binghamton that his town has the worst traffic accident record in the sector. Parker wrecks Binghamton's jeep. With all the wrecks that have been reported, Binghamton wants to keep this off the record. He tells McHale to fix the jeep without any help from motor pool or he will put Parker in the brig. The crew learn that the jeep needs a new motor. The only way that McHale can get a new motor for the jeep is from Balducci, a local repairman. Balducci is in need of a body to race his new motor in the town's annual Grand Prix auto race. If McHale will loan him the body for the race, he will give him the motor when the race is over. McHale plans to get Binghamton out of town during the race. Carpenter is traffic control manager, but Binghamton needs him. So, Binghamton assigns traffic control to Parker. The race is to start soon. Balducci's friend, Carbolini, arrives in a new German staff car that he stole. Binghamton is supposed to still be away but unexpectedly returns. Now McHale tries to keep the proceedings away from him but it will be nearly impossible as Harrigan and General Bronson arrive right at the finish of the race. The General lets things slide because the Army acquires the German's new staff car. Bronson is also a fan of race car driving.
136	28	"An Ensign's Best Friend"	Hollingsworth Morse	Robert J. Hilliard & Mickey Freeman	March 29, 1966
Binghamton has received word from the General to put a stop to all fraternizing with the local women. After finding his jeep full of dogs, Binghamton orders all dogs in town must now have a license and be on a leash. Meanwhile, McHale and the crew notice that Parker has been going to town for the last six days. They are concerned that he is seeing a woman against the new order. They follow him to a house where he meets a beautiful young woman, Miss Lombardo. So they think he is seeing her. But Parker is actually just walking her dog Angelina. They then see the woman kissing another man and suspect she is two-timing Parker. After receiving a call from Colonel Harrigan, Binghamton searches fraternizers. The townspeople are complaining to Dino Barone, the Mayor's assistant, about the new dog rules. Parker loses Angelina. The crew confront Parker about Angelina and he tells them she is a dog. Some dogs chase Binghamton and Carpenter around town. They dress as women to avoid the dogs. Harrigan sees them in their outfits. Parker and the crew see Angelina enter Dino's office. Binghamton and Harrigan enter to arrest Parker for violating the fraternizing rule. But when they learn that Angelina is having babies, Binghamton believes he has Parker on more than one charge. That is, until Harrigan discovers the babies are puppies.
137	29	"Binghamton, at 20 Paces"	Hollingsworth Morse	John Fenton Murray	April 5, 1966
In town, Parker sees a crying woman, Elena. She explains that she and her boyfriend Marco had a fight and now will not marry. Marco arrives and to make him jealous, Elena kisses Parker. After knocking Parker down, Marco presses Parker's face into a plate of spaghetti. Parker tries to have Fuji teach him Judo in case he encounters Marco again. McHale goes into town with Parker. There Dino Barone points out Count Cesare Spinetti (David Opatoshu) to them. Parker accidentally spills wine on Spinetti. Spinetti feels Parker has dishonored him. The Count, an expert marksman, challenges Parker to an old-fashioned duel. Parker has been feeling down about being called a coward, so he wants to duel with the Count. McHale tries to convince Spinetti that Parker is also an expert shot, but the Count does not fall for it. The next morning at the duel, McHale tries to get Spinetti to use guns with blanks inside. Spinetti insists on using his guns. Binghamton arrives, hoping to arrest Parker for dueling. In the process, Binghamton insults Spinetti and is challenged to a duel. A German air raid preempts any duel. The next day, it is Colonel Harrigan who insults the Count.
138	30	"Wally for Congress"	Hollingsworth Morse	Elroy Schwartz	April 12, 1966
Harrigan informs Binghamton that Washington insider, Frank Templeton (Stanley Adams), is making a visit to Italy to see how the war effort is advancing. Templeton is a political big-wig with a reputation for turning war heroes into politicians. Binghamton would considering running for Congress if he is supported by Templeton. Binghamton must quickly change from a "desk jockey" into a fearless, battle-hardened commander. He decides to join the PT 73 crew. A surprised McHale tries to convince Binghamton not to. They search for a German warship. Something Binghamton does almost causes the 73 to be sunk. When they return, there are some local women waiting to have a party. Wanting to fit in, Binghamton is all for the party. Carpenter arrives and tells Binghamton that Templeton will arrive earlier than expected. McHale now knows Binghamton's plan. Binghamton blackmails the men into staging a German ambush. Harrigan, McHale and Binghamton are driving Templeton to the airport. The crew fires on the jeep. Binghamton makes it look as though he is going after the Germans. He tells Templeton that he killed all but one of them and Templeton is impressed by Binghamton's bravery. The plan backfires when an army unit captures the crew in their German uniforms. Templeton sees that Binghamton lied to him when Harrigan recognizes McHale's crew.
