= Rollin Moriyama =

Japanese actor

- Rollin Moriyama in Perry Mason 1959
- Born: Ryoichi Moriyama; October 11, 1907; Fukushima, Japan
- Died: December 25, 1992 (aged 85); Santa Clara, California, U.S.
- Occupation: Actor
- Spouse: Shigeyo Ito (m. 1934)

Ryoichi "Rollin" Moriyama (sometimes credited as Roland Moriyama) was a Japanese character actor who was active in Hollywood from the 1940s through the 1980s.

== Biography ==
Rollin was born in Fukushima, Japan, in 1907. He arrived in San Francisco, California, around 1919. His mother died when he was young, and he and his father eventually settled in the San Gabriel Valley in Los Angeles County, California.

During World War II, like many Japanese Americans, he and his family were imprisoned at Manzanar, a concentration camp in California's Sierra Nevada Mountains. After his release, he returned to Los Angeles, where he got parts in films like The Snow Creature and A Girl Named Tamiko.

== Selected filmography ==
- The Snow Creature (1954)
- Between Heaven and Hell (1956)
- 20 Million Miles to Earth (1957)
- Sayonara (1957)
- The Crimson Kimono (1959)
- Battle of the Coral Sea (1959)
- Never So Few (1959)
- Wake Me When It's Over (1960)
- The Gallant Hours (1960)
- A Girl Named Tamiko (1962)
- Morituri (1965)
- Walk Don't Run (1966)
- The Kentucky Fried Movie (1977)
- Sextette (1977)
- Rabbit Test (1978)
- Foul Play (1978)
- Honky Tonk Freeway (1981)
