= McHale's Navy (disambiguation) =

McHale's Navy is an American sitcom starring Ernest Borgnine that aired from 1962 to 1966.

McHale's Navy may also refer to:

- McHale's Navy (1964 film)
- McHale's Navy (1997 film)

== See also ==
- McHale's Navy Joins the Air Force, a 1965 film based on the television series
