= McHale's Navy (1964 film) =

1964 film by Edward Montagne

- McHale's Navy
- Directed by: Edward Montagne
- Screenplay by: Si Rose; Frank Gill Jr.
- Story by: George Carleton Brown
- Based on: McHale's Navy
- Produced by: Edward Montagne; Si Rose
- Starring: Ernest Borgnine; Joe Flynn; Tim Conway; Carl Ballantine; Gary Vinson; Billy Sands; Edson Stroll; Gavin MacLeod; John Wright; Yoshio Yoda; Bob Hastings; Claudine Longet; Jean Willes
- Cinematography: William Margulies
- Edited by: Sam E. Waxman
- Music by: Jerry Fielding
- Production company: Universal Pictures
- Distributed by: Universal Pictures
- Release date: June 10, 1964 (USA)
- Running time: 93 minutes
- Country: United States
- Language: English

McHale's Navy is a 1964 American Technicolor comedy film based on the 1962–1966 black and white television sitcom McHale's Navy starring Ernest Borgnine, Tim Conway and Joe Flynn, which had in turn originated with a one-hour anthology drama starring Borgnine entitled Seven Against the Sea. The film version was directed by series producer Edward Montagne and its supporting cast includes Carl Ballantine, Gavin MacLeod, Jean Willes, Claudine Longet, and George Kennedy. The film was followed by a sequel entitled McHale's Navy Joins the Air Force which did not feature Borgnine or Carl Ballantine. A remake entitled McHale's Navy, was released in 1997 and features an appearance by Ernest Borgnine playing a 75-year old McHale. The filming location for New Caledonia is the same as the one used in the series. For more information on the main characters see the TV series McHale's Navy. The movie was released on DVD for Region 1 on January 31, 2011.

The film was released following the end of the second season of the television series.

== Plot ==
Set "Somewhere in the South Pacific" in 1943, Gruber's gambling scheme backfires when he tries to raise money for St Theresa's Orphanage through off-track horserace betting. Heavy bets on the horse "Silver Spot" leaves the crew owing a large sum to sailors and marines. Captain Binghamton is attempting to spy on the illegal operation from the air, but Ensign Parker mistakes his plane for the enemy and shoots it down. The Captain is rescued from a wet landing in the bay, but can't restrict McHale and his crew to base because they have been ordered to report to New Caledonia for a special briefing.

Some time later, when the crew is in New Caledonia, Ensign Parker runs PT-73 into the dock and destroys the dock and cargo of businessman Henri Le Clerc, leaving the crew even more in debt. However, while on a reconnaissance mission to an island the crew comes across Silver Spot who was lost on the island after the horse was being moved from Australia. They decide to enter Silver Spot in a race in New Caledonia to win enough money to pay all their debts. Otherwise, the only way to pay all their debts is for McHale to marry his old flame Margot Monet, also known as Maggie Monahan, who owns a gambling parlor in New Caledonia (but who McHale would rather not marry). They try to disguise the horse with much heavy hair, but when the hair starts to come off during the race they decide to use a smoke screen from the 73 to keep anyone from seeing too much. However, this made it impossible for the racetrack authorities to know who won. But the smokescreen also caused a Japanese submarine to be captured by the 73.

In the end, Le Clerc is so grateful for saving his town he forgives the debt. The crew also receive a reward for rescuing Silver Spot which just happens to be enough to pay the sailors and marines. While all this was going on the PT-73 crew was dogging Binghamton and his aide Carpenter. And just as they were leaving New Caledonia the bashful Parker is kissed by Bouchard and the lightheaded Parker accidentally sets off a depth charge which destroys Le Clerc's dock and cargo again. But rather than marry Monet to pay for the new damage, McHale and crew immediately scramble to get out of New Caledonia.

== Cast ==
- Ernest Borgnine as Lieutenant Commander Quinton McHale
- Tim Conway as Ensign Charles Parker
- Joe Flynn as Captain Wallace B. Binghamton ("Old Leadbottom")
- Bob Hastings as Lieutenant Elroy Carpenter
- Gary Vinson as George "Christy" Christopher, Quartermaster
- Bobby Wright as Willy Moss, Radioman
- Carl Ballantine as Lester Gruber, Torpedoman's Mate
- Billy Sands as Harrison "Tinker" Bell, Engineman & Motor Machinist Mate
- Edson Stroll as Virgil Edwards, Gunner's Mate
- Gavin MacLeod as Joseph "Happy" Haines, Seaman
- Yoshio Yoda as Fuji Kobiaji, Cook, Seaman 3C, Japanese PW.
- George Kennedy as Henri Le Clerc
- Jean Willes as Margot Monet (Maggie Monahan)
- Claudine Longet as Andrea Bouchard
- Cliff Norton as Australian sergeant major
- Marcel Hillaire as Chief de Gendarmes

== See also ==
- List of American films of 1964
