= McHale's Navy Joins the Air Force =

1965 film

- Theatrical release poster
- Directed by: Edward Montagne
- Screenplay by: John Fenton Murray
- Story by: William Lederer
- Based on: McHale's Navy
- Produced by: Edward Montagne; Si Rose
- Starring: Tim Conway; Joe Flynn; Gary Vinson; Billy Sands; Edson Stroll; John Wright; Yoshio Yoda; Bob Hastings; Gavin MacLeod; Tom Tully; Jacques Aubuchon; Jean Hale; Susan Silo; Henry Beckman
- Cinematography: Lionel Lindon
- Edited by: Sam E. Waxman
- Music by: Jerry Fielding
- Production company: Universal Pictures
- Distributed by: Universal Pictures
- Release date: July 9, 1965 (USA)
- Running time: 90 minutes
- Country: United States
- Language: English

McHale's Navy Joins the Air Force is a 1965 film based upon the television 1962–1966 sitcom McHale's Navy. Series supporting players Joe Flynn and Tim Conway are the leads for this sequel to the first film made in 1964, also titled McHale's Navy. Most of the film is based on their two characters, particularly Ensign Parker.

== Plot ==
Binghamton (Joe Flynn) is sent to a staff meeting in Brisbane, Australia, and is forced to use the PT-73 to get there after Fuji (Yoshio Yoda) sabotages Lt. Carpenter's (Bob Hastings) PT-116. While in Brisbane, Binghamton orders the PT-73 crew to remain on board, but they switch uniforms with Russian crewmen on the adjoining docked ship so they can leave the ship without being noticed. In a mix-up, Parker (Tim Conway) switches uniforms with Lt. Harkness (Ted Bessell), who then is mistakenly arrested by the Russian NKGB and put on the Russian ship, but he later escapes and spends the remainder of the movie trying to get back to his post. Parker impersonates Lt. Harkness, with Binghamton helping him, until Harkness comes back. Because of Harkness' reputation as a lady killer, women are drawn to the very shy Parker. Parker also has to avoid Lt Harkness' father, General Harkness (Tom Tully), for fear of being found out. In the meantime, Harkness (or rather Parker) is promoted three times to Lt. Colonel by unwittingly scoring three military victories. Even after being found out, Parker is by then too big a hero and the military brass decide to cover up the whole mix-up of Parker pretending to be someone else. At the end of the film, Parker performs an impressive impersonation of then-President Franklin D. Roosevelt, much to the consternation of his PT-73 crewmates.

== Cast ==
- Joe Flynn as Captain Wally Binghamton
- Tim Conway as Ensign Charles Parker
- Bob Hastings as Lt. Elroy Carpenter
- Gary Vinson as George Christopher
- Billy Sands as Motor Machinist Mate Harrison Bell
- Edson Stroll as Virgil Edwards
- Bobby Wright as Willy Moss
- Yoshio Yoda as Takeo "Fuji" Fujiwara
- Gavin MacLeod as Seaman Joseph Haines
- Tom Tully as Gen. Harkness
- Susan Silo as Cpl. "Smitty" Smith
- Henry Beckman as Col. Platt
- Ted Bessell as Lt. Wilbur Harkness
- Jean Hale as Sgt. Madge Collins
- Cliff Norton as Maj. Bill Grady
- Jacques Aubuchon as Dimitri
- Joe Ploski as Russian Seaman

== Production ==
Series star Ernest Borgnine was unavailable due to a scheduling conflict with the 1965 film The Flight of the Phoenix. However, in a Cinema Retro interview, Borgnine said producer Edward Montagne wanted to make the film cheaply, without him, and would not show him the script. Carl Ballantine also doesn't appear and the PT-73 crew is not seen in large portions. The film, which also features Ted Bessell, was directed by Montagne. Save for Quinton McHale (Borgnine) and Lester Gruber (Ballantine), the film features all the main characters from the television series.

== Historical Accuracy ==
The film is titled McHale's Navy Joins the Air Force—where "Air Force" in an American context usually refers to the United States Air Force (USAF). Since the plot is situated "Somewhere in the South Pacific, 1943", this would be historically inaccurate, as until 1947 the Air Force was part of the United States Army and from 1941 was known as the United States Army Air Forces (USAAF). However, many servicemen colloquially referred to the USAAF as the "Air Force" during the era in which the movie is set.

== Release ==
The film was released in theaters on July 9, 1965, and later to VHS on March 31, 1998.

== See also ==
- List of American films of 1965
