= Gary Vinson =

American actor (1936–1984)

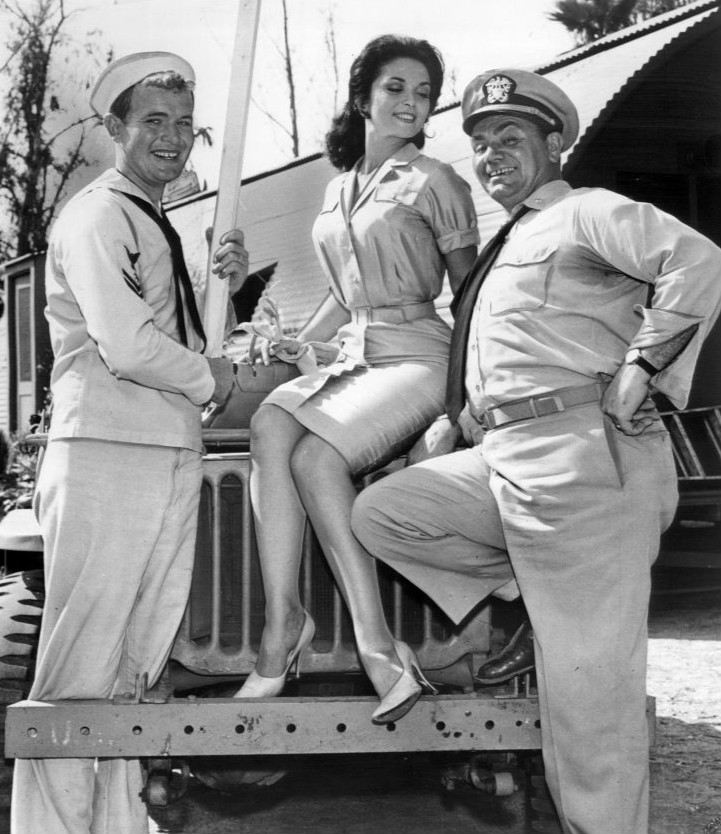
- Gary Vinson (left) with Lisa Seagram and Ernest Borgnine in the October 7, 1963 episode of McHale's Navy "Is There a Doctor in the Hut?"
- Born: Robert Gary Vinson; October 22, 1936; El Segundo, California, U.S.
- Died: October 15, 1984 (aged 47); Redondo Beach, California, U.S.
- Occupation: Actor
- Years active: 1957–1983

Robert Gary Vinson (October 22, 1936 – October 15, 1984) was an American actor who appeared in significant roles in three television series of the 1960s: The Roaring 20s, McHale's Navy, and Pistols 'n' Petticoats.

== Early years ==
Vinson was born in El Segundo, California. He attended El Segundo High School and El Camino Junior College.

== Television ==
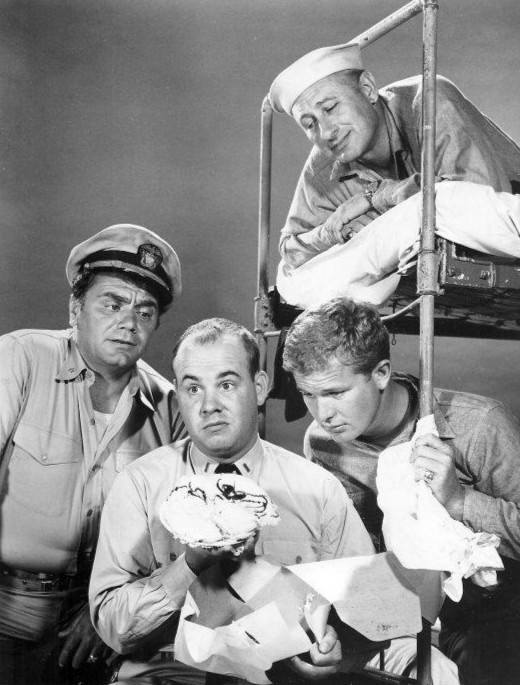
Ernest Borgnine, Tim Conway, Vinson and Carl Ballantine in the 1962–66 ABC World War II sitcom McHale's Navy.

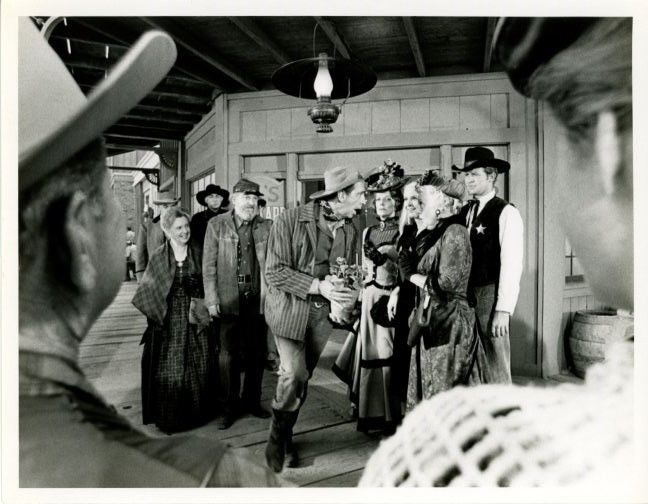
Vinson (right) as Sheriff Harold Sikes in the 1966–67 CBS western sitcom Pistols 'n' Petticoats.

Vinson began acting professionally when he was 18; his television debut came in the role of a page boy on Milton Berle's first program from NBC's new Burbank studios. In an interview, he stated:

I started during the Marlon Brando era when guys my age in Hollywood were all wearing pouts, torn shirts, mussed hair, and looked like they needed a bath. I refused to go that route so whenever anyone needed an all-American-boy type I was the only all-American-boy type available."

Among his early TV roles was one as defendant Marv Adams in the fourth Perry Mason episode, "The Case of the Drowning Duck". He guest-starred on other various television series, including Whirlybirds, Gunsmoke, The Adventures of Ozzie and Harriet, Bachelor Father, Cheyenne, Maverick- ("A Fellow's Brother", in 1959), Sugarfoot, Wagon Train, Laramie, Bat Masterson, Harbor Command, Colt .45, The Rough Riders, Hawaiian Eye, and in three episodes of 77 Sunset Strip.

In 1962 he was cast as Bruce Randall in the episode "The Parish Car" of the ABC series, Going My Way, starring Gene Kelly as a Roman Catholic priest in New York City. That same year he was cast as Charlie Fox in the episode "The Runaway Groom" of the NBC western series The Tall Man.

In 1960, Vinson was cast in his first recurring role in a series as copyboy Chris Higbee in 39 episodes of the ABC/Warner Brothers drama series The Roaring 20's. The series ended its run in January 1962, and Vinson then appeared as Alvin in the episode "This Gun for Sale" of the sitcom, Room for One More. Earlier he had appeared as a guest star in another ABC/WB series, The Alaskans. That same year Vinson was cast as Quartermaster George "Christy" Christopher on the ABC sitcom McHale's Navy, starring Ernest Borgnine. Vinson appeared in 79 episodes from 1962 to 1966, when the series ended. He wrote one episode. After McHale's Navy Vinson was cast as Sheriff Harold Sikes in CBS's Pistols 'n' Petticoats.

In 1968, he starred as Beau Graves in two episodes of the ABC crime drama series The Mod Squad. In 1969 Vinson guest-starred as Sheriff Tom Wade in the episode "Crime Wave in Buffalo Springs" on James Drury's The Virginian. He portrayed the character Joseph Foxx in "Moment of Truth" on Efrem Zimbalist, Jr.'s crime series The F.B.I.. During the 1970s and 1980s Vinson continued with guest roles on episodic television appearing again in The Mod Squad, Love, American Style, McCloud, The Streets of San Francisco, The Waltons, S.W.A.T., Baa Baa Black Sheep, Battlestar Galactica and Barnaby Jones.

Vinson's last on-screen appearances were as the Air Marshal in the 1982 episode "No Way Out" of ABC's The Fall Guy, as Sperling in the 1982 episode "A Minor Problem" on CBS' The Incredible Hulk and as Jake Cord in the 1983 episode "Chance of a Lifetime" on the NBC family drama Boone.

== Film ==
Vinson's feature film debut came in Rockabilly Baby (1957). In 1959, he signed a term contract with Warner Bros.

== Death ==
On October 15, 1984, a week before his 48th birthday, Vinson committed suicide by self-inflicted gunshot in Redondo Beach, California.

== Filmography ==
Year	Title	Role	Notes
1957	The Young Stranger	Boy in Courtroom	(scenes deleted)
1957	Fear Strikes Out	High School Ballplayer	Uncredited
1957	Perry Mason	Marv Adams	Case of the Drowning Duck, s1e4
1957	The Invisible Boy	Young soldier	Uncredited
1957	Rockabilly Baby	Jimmy Carter	
1958	The Restless Years	Bruce's Friend	Uncredited
1958	Bat Masterson	Billy Thompson	S1E7 "A Noose Fits Anybody"
1959	Yellowstone Kelly	Lieutenant	
1960	High School Caesar	Bob Williams	
1961	A Majority of One	Mr. McMillan	
1964	McHale's Navy	Quartermaster George Christopher	
1965	McHale's Navy Joins the Air Force	Quartermaster George Christopher	
1968	Nobody's Perfect	Walt Purdy	
1975	Half a House	Golfer	
