= Yoshio Yoda =

Japanese-born American actor and businessman (1934–2023)

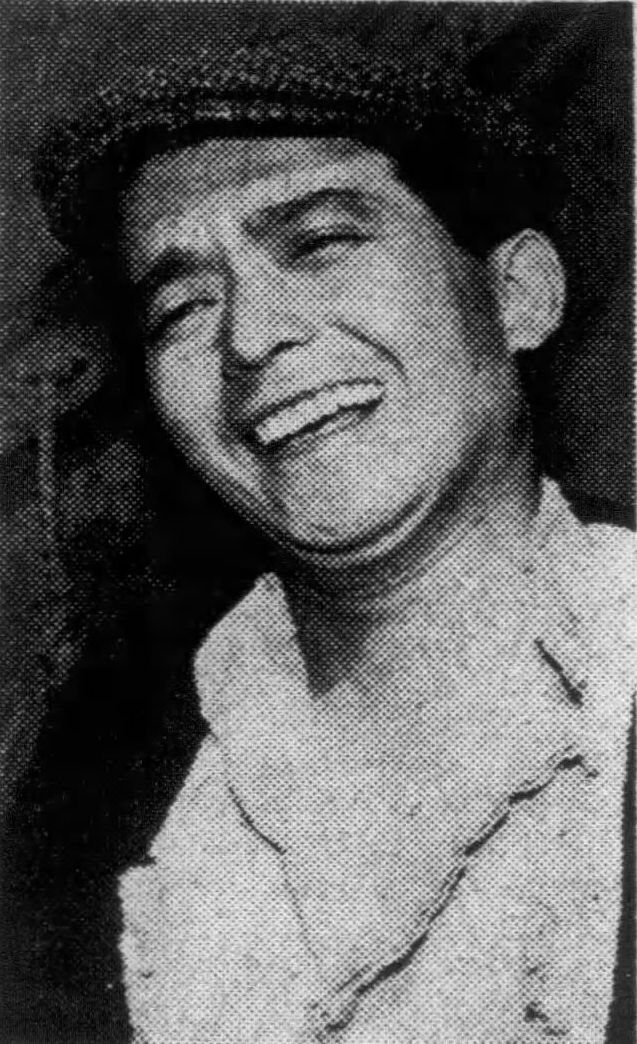
- Yoda in 1965
- Born: March 31, 1934; Tokyo, Empire of Japan
- Died: January 13, 2023 (aged 88); Fullerton, California, U.S.
- Other names: James Yoda
- Occupations: Actor, film producer, business executive
- Years active: 1962–1965
- Known for: McHale's Navy

James Yoshio Yoda (March 31, 1934 – January 13, 2023) was a Japanese-born American actor and businessman who played Takeo Fujiwara in the American television series McHale's Navy.

== Early life ==
Yoda was born on March 31, 1934, in Tokyo, Japan, the only son of a family of manufacturers. After Yoda graduated high school, he enrolled at Keio University to study law. During this period, Yoda met Edward Ugast, then general manager in East Asia of 20th Century Fox. Ugast encouraged Yoda to pursue a career in acting. Yoda abandoned his studies and immigrated to the United States, whereupon he enrolled at University of Southern California in August 1958 with aspirations of becoming a film producer. In summer 1961, William White, a USC faculty member, received a call from Joe Pasternak of MGM seeking a young man who could speak English and Japanese. White contacted Yoda, who was then put in touch with MGM's casting office. After a series of interviews, Yoda was cast in the part of Sgt. Roy Tada in The Horizontal Lieutenant. Yoda's success in that role led him to be cast as Imperial Japanese Navy Seaman 3rd Class Fujiwara "Fuji" Takeo Kobiashi in the American television series McHale's Navy. He was recast in the role in the later feature-length films McHale's Navy and McHale's Navy Joins the Air Force.

Yoda continued attending school while acting, eventually earning a degree in cinema arts.

== Later career ==
After McHale's Navy ended in 1966, Yoda acted in the 1969 segment of Love American Style titled "Love and the Letter." He was associate producer for "The Walking Major", which was nominated for a Golden Globe Award in 1971.

In the cast reunion extra feature on the McHale's Navy first season DVD set, Edson Stroll (Virgil in the series) stated that Yoda began primarily using his middle name of James and worked as a Toyota vice-president. He also reported that Yoda had secured his American citizenship. Yoda had lived in Honolulu, Hawaii for fifteen years, serving as assistant vice president of inventory for Toyota in Hawaii, where he had become a United States citizen and was active in the Lions Club. From 2012 until his death, Yoda lived in Fullerton, California.

== Personal life ==
Yoda announced that he was to wed Yoko Okazaki, a Japanese fashion model, in June 1964. In 1965, Yoda headed the panel of judges that chose the Nisei Week Festival Queen at the Biltmore Hotel in Los Angeles.

Yoda died in Fullerton, California, on January 13, 2023, at the age of 88.
