= McHale's Navy =

American television sitcom (1962–1966)

- Front to back: McHale, Binghamton, Parker, Fuji, Carpenter, Tinker, Virgil, Christy, Willy, Gruber
- Created by: Edward Montagne
- Starring: Ernest Borgnine; Tim Conway; Joe Flynn; Bob Hastings
- Theme music composer: Axel Stordahl
- Composers: Axel Stordahl; Cyril Mockridge; Frank Comstock; Jack Elliott
- Country of origin: United States
- No. of seasons: 4
- No. of episodes: 138 (list of episodes)

Production
- Producers: Edward Montagne; Si Rose (1964–1966)
- Camera setup: Single-camera
- Running time: 30 minutes
- Production companies: Sto-Rev-Co Productions; Revue Studios (season 1); Universal Television (seasons 2-4)

Original release
- Network: ABC
- Release: October 11, 1962 – April 12, 1966

McHale's Navy is an American sitcom starring Ernest Borgnine that aired 138 half-hour episodes over four seasons, from October 11, 1962, to April 12, 1966, on the ABC television network. The series was filmed in black and white and originated from a one-hour drama titled "Seven Against the Sea", broadcast on April 3, 1962, as part of the Alcoa Premiere anthology series. The ABC series spawned three feature films: McHale's Navy (1964); a sequel, McHale's Navy Joins the Air Force (1965); and a 1997 sequel-remake of the original series.

== "Seven Against the Sea" (1962) ==
Academy Award–winning dramatic actor Ernest Borgnine first appeared as Quinton McHale in an hour-long PT boat drama called "Seven Against the Sea", which aired as an episode of Alcoa Premiere in 1962, an ABC dramatic anthology also known as Fred Astaire's Premiere Theatre and hosted by Fred Astaire, who introduced television audiences to the Quinton McHale character. It is considered the pilot show for the series although it is an hour-long drama instead of a half-hour situation comedy and is starkly different in tone.

=== Plot ===
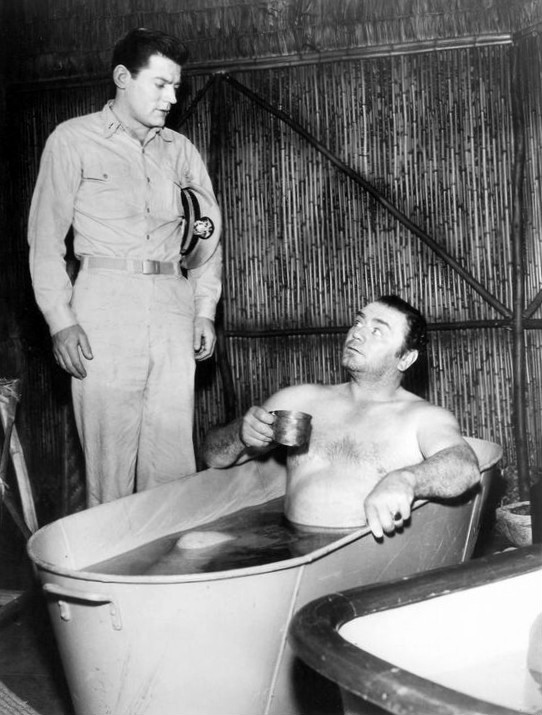
Ron Foster as Lieutenant Durham and Ernest Borgnine as McHale from "Seven Against the Sea", 1962

During World War II, Lieutenant Commander Quinton McHale (Borgnine) is the commanding officer of the U.S. Navy PT boat PT-73, stationed at the fictional Pacific island base of Taratupa. In the late spring of 1942, the Japanese heavily bomb the island, destroying the base. Only 18 of 150 naval aviators and Marines on the base survive. With Japanese patrols in the region too heavy for a Navy rescue mission, McHale and his men survive by hiding on the island. Assisted by the native tribes whom they befriend, the sailors live a pleasant island existence. After months of leisurely life, strait-laced, by-the-book Annapolis graduate Lieutenant Durham (Ron Foster) parachutes onto the island. His job is to assume duties as McHale's executive officer and help him get the base on Taratupa back into action.

Durham faces an uphill battle: the men have gone native. One man has started a native laundry service, and McHale operates a still, making moonshine for the men and the natives. In addition, McHale is friendly with the native chief; the two even bathe in the same room, attended to by one of the chief's wives. When Durham informs McHale of his orders, McHale refuses to follow them. It is clear that while McHale is as loyal as any American, following the devastation caused by the Japanese on the island, he is reluctant to risk losing more men. His concern now is for their survival until they can be rescued, which creates friction between Durham and McHale.

When they get word that a Marine battalion is pinned on a beach and an enemy cruiser is planning to attack the beachhead in the morning, McHale's attitude changes. McHale is ordered to use all his boats to protect the beachhead and the Marines, but he has no boats, since the Japanese sank them all. However, McHale and his men manage to capture a Japanese PT boat that arrives at the island. Surprising the men and Durham, McHale does not plan to use the boat to evacuate his men or the Marine battalion. Instead, he will attack and destroy the Japanese cruiser. He estimates that since they are on a Japanese boat, flying a Japanese flag, they can move in and torpedo the cruiser twice and send it to the bottom.

With just two torpedoes, McHale, Durham, and a crew set out in darkness aboard the acquired PT boat to find and engage the cruiser. By patrolling the only water deep enough for the cruiser to reach the beach, they spot it about two hours before dawn. McHale pilots the PT boat at maximum speed directly towards the cruiser, allowing the crew to fire both torpedoes, the second of which impacts the bow of the cruiser and causes a very large explosion, implying its destruction. The PT boat is last seen, apparently returning to Taratupa, now flying an American flag.

=== Cast ===
The cast of "Seven Against the Sea" was:

- Ernest Borgnine as Captain Quentin McHale
- Ron Foster as Lieutenant Robert Durham
- William Bramley as Bosun Ward Gallagher
- John Wright as Willy Moss
- Gary Vinson as Christy Christopher
- Steve Harris as Plumber Harris
- Brian Eliot as Jenkins
- Bob Okazaki as Japanese Officer
- Michael Dugan as Seaman Number One
- Juano Hernandez as Chief Mamora

=== Response ===
This episode of an early dramatic anthology series received respectable ratings and ABC ordered a series. The series requested by the network was significantly different in tone from the pilot. In an interview in Cinema Retro magazine, Borgnine said the show was meant as a vehicle for Ron Foster, who was to be contracted to Universal Pictures, but that did not work out. Producer Jennings Lang recalled the 1953 film Destination Gobi inspiring a half-hour comedy with the Borgnine character's PT boat. The lead character in Destination Gobi, played by Richard Widmark, was named McHale.

"Seven Against the Sea" is available for public viewing at the Paley Center for Media (formerly the Museum of Television and Radio) in New York City and Los Angeles. As of 2024, it can also be found on YouTube.

== McHale's Navy (1962–1966) ==
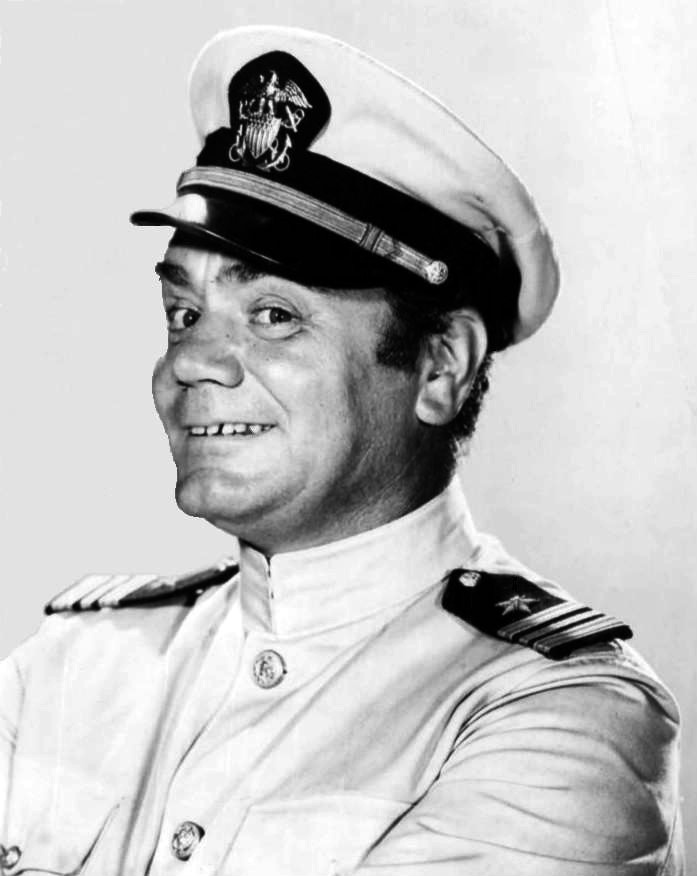
Ernest Borgnine in McHale's Navy

This military service comedy series was set in the Pacific theatre of World War II—for the last season, the setting changed to the European theater in Italy—and focused on antics of the misfit crew of PT-73 led by Lieutenant Commander Quinton McHale, played by Borgnine. The producer, Edward Montagne, had enjoyed success with The Phil Silvers Show—often referred to as Sergeant Bilko, after the series' protagonist—a military comedy that ran from 1955 to 1959 about an opportunistic non-commissioned officer and his loyal platoon putting loony things over on the camp commander. While the pilot had been dramatic, with overtones of Henry Fonda's introspective Mister Roberts, Montagne turned the "McHale" project into "Bilko in the Navy" and recruited Sergeant Bilko actors and writers.

However, unlike Sergeant Bilko, which was set in peacetime, McHale's Navy was set during World War II, although much of what takes place is, in some ways, as if it were peacetime with the crew permanently stationed in one location and concerned about peacetime duties rather than fighting a war. At the time of the series, then-President John F. Kennedy was known as the decorated wartime commander of PT-109. A popular book, PT-109: John F. Kennedy in World War II by Robert J. Donovan, came out the previous year, and a feature film based on the book, PT 109, a year after the series’ debut. PT-109 was referenced in the episode "Send Us A Hero".

=== Plot ===
The basic plot is that McHale's crew schemes to make money, attract women and enjoy themselves, and the efforts of Captain Binghamton (McHale's superior) to rid himself of the PT-73 crew for good, either by transfer or court-martial. Although they often get into trouble, they typically manage to get out of it. Despite their scheming, conniving, and often lazy and unmilitary ways, McHale's crew is always successful in combat in the end. This bears close resemblance to the British radio programme The Navy Lark, broadcast around the same period.

The first episode, titled "An Ensign for McHale", sets the tone for the entire series. It involves Ensign Parker's assignment to McHale's crew after they already had gone through several ensigns who could not put up with their unmilitary, slovenly, and insubordinate ways. One of them even suffered a nervous breakdown. Parker is given one week by Binghamton to reform the crew or be given the worst reassignment possible. At first, the crew treats Parker as badly as they treated the other ensigns, but after McHale sees Parker has integrity, he decides to help Parker out by having his crew be much more like regular Navy.

Sometimes, the crewmen wear disguises to carry out elaborate schemes, such as when McHale needs to stage a phony Japanese attack and several of the crew dress up in Japanese uniforms. At other times, the crew dresses up to look like "native savages". When a situation calls for a disguise as a woman, one of the crew dresses in drag. When they are in Italy, several of the crewmen disguise themselves in German uniforms.

==== Settings ====
The entire show is based in only two locations: in the South Pacific at a fictional base called Taratupa, and later in an equally fictional town in Italy called Voltafiore.

The first few episodes merely indicate that Taratupa is "somewhere in the South Pacific 1943." The implied location (per the first episode) is islands north of New Zealand. While in the South Pacific, McHale's crew lives on "McHale's Island", across the bay from Taratupa. It keeps them away from the main base, where they are free to carry out their antics and even fight the war.

The final season has a total change of scenery as Binghamton, Carpenter and the entire PT-73 crew, along with Fuji (who hid in the boat as it was being transported), move to the liberated Italian theater in "late 1944" to the coastal town of Voltafiore in "Southern Italy", where Binghamton becomes the military governor and they become members of PT Boat Squadron 19. Moneymaking schemes of the wacky and somewhat crooked Mayor Mario Lugatto (Jay Novello) and the looney antics of the citizens introduce many more plot twists and gags. For instance, when McHale and his crew first arrive in Voltafiore, they are greeted by the newly liberated citizens with cries of Sieg Heil! While Binghamton and Carpenter live nicely in the city hall, McHale and his men are forced by Binghamton to bivouac in tents near the beach. However, they stumble on an abandoned wine cellar, which becomes their secret underground hideout where they hide Fuji (and of course Binghamton nearly discovers it several times). They later add a submarine-style periscope and fancy furnishings.

=== Episodes ===
Season	Episodes	Originally released	
Season	Episodes	First released	Last released
1	36	October 11, 1962	June 27, 1963
2	36	September 17, 1963	May 19, 1964
3	36	September 15, 1964	June 1, 1965
4	30	September 14, 1965	April 12, 1966

McHale's Navy came to an end in 1966, due to low ratings and repetitive storylines.

=== Regular characters ===
==== Lieutenant Commander McHale ====
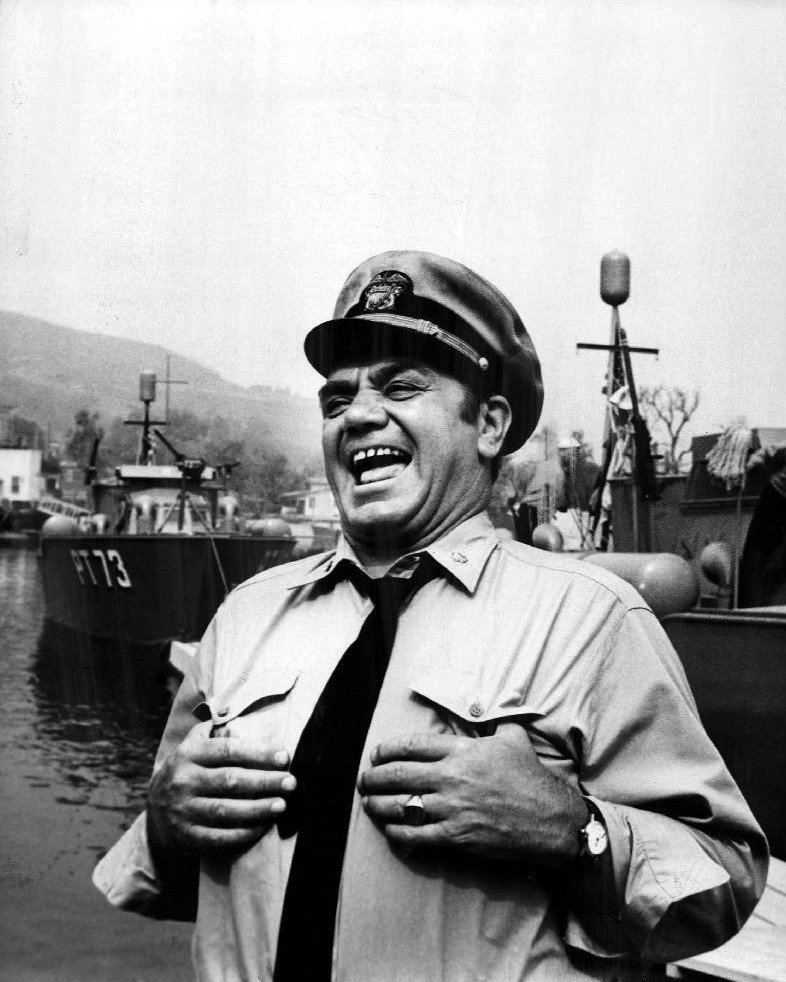
Ernest Borgnine as Commander McHale.

Lieutenant Commander Quinton McHale (Ernest Borgnine) – A principal character of the series, he is also a former captain of a tramp steamer who is familiar with the South Pacific and is especially knowledgeable about the islands and natives around Taratupa, which often helps him in combat situations and makes him a favorite with the admirals. Like his crew, he is unmilitary in many ways, (Note: Borgnine actually served in the U.S. Navy from October 1935 to October 1941 and again from January 1942 to September 1945, as a gunner's mate first class.) but always a strong and competent leader who is very protective of his crew. Also like his crew, McHale likes to wear Hawaiian-style clothing when off duty and to use the PT-73 to go deep-sea fishing and water skiing. As Gruber says in the 1964 film, "That's no officer, that's our skipper".

Gruff but lovable, he often calls his crew "schlockmeisters" and goofballs. He is called "Skip" by his crew. Although he very often bellows at them and tries to put his foot down, he loves his crew too much to be all that hard on them. McHale's catchphrases are "Knock it off, you eight-balls" and when trying to come up with an excuse, a rapid "Well-a, well-a, well-a." He speaks Japanese, Italian and local island dialects. In the 1964 film, he briefly speaks fluent French. When the crew is in Italy, McHale's knowledge of Italian serves him quite well and his mother is Italian (both of Borgnine's parents were from Italy). In a dual role, Borgnine played his lookalike Italian cousin, Giuseppe, who does not speak English in "Giuseppe McHale" and "The Return of Giuseppe."

==== Ensign Parker ====
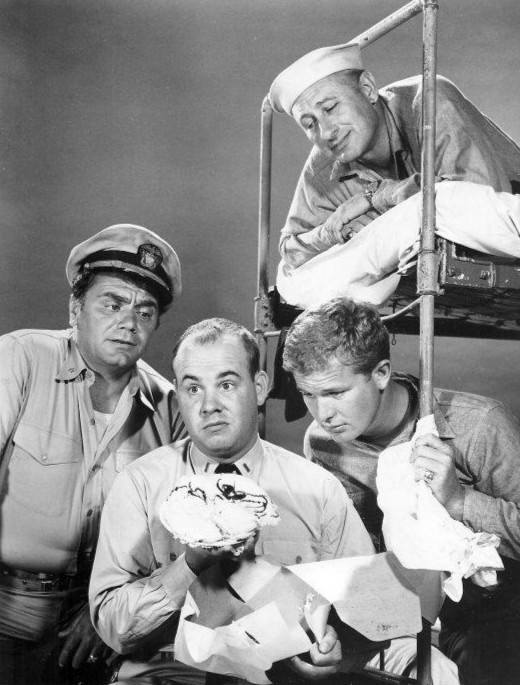
Ernest Borgnine, Tim Conway, Gary Vinson and Carl Ballantine

Ensign Charles Beaumont Parker (Tim Conway) – McHale's likable, but goofy second-in-command, he is referred to by McHale as "Chuck" and by the crew as "Mister Parker" (in the United States Navy, officers ranking from warrant officer to lieutenant commander were referred to as "Mister" until 1973). Conway's bashful, unassertive, naïve, mildly gung-ho bungler often succeeds in spite of clownish ineptitude (a theme that was career-defining). Like Conway, Ensign Parker is from Chagrin Falls, Ohio. Parker was born between about 1916 and 1920 (Note: Parker is 27 years old in "Send this Ensign to Camp", while in another episode he is 24 years old.) and worked for the Chagrin Falls Gazette.

Although he tries to be military, he is too dimwitted to command much respect and many of the episodes involve Parker getting into trouble because of his bumbling and ineptitude such as accidentally firing depth charges or shooting down Allied aircraft. Even before becoming a member of McHale's crew, Ensign Parker's personnel file is a laundry list of major foul-ups, including crashing a destroyer escort into a dock, doing something unspecified in heavy fog to the heavy cruiser USS Minneapolis and calling in a naval airstrike on a Marine gasoline dump.

Because of his considerable bumbling, the crew tries to protect Parker, who they feel will not survive as an officer without their help. Also, he is very slow to catch on and does not know when to keep his mouth closed. McHale usually gives Parker a discreet kick or stomp on the foot to get him to shut up. For instance, when Binghamton says "the cat is out of the bag," Parker says, "I'm sure it's around here somewhere, Sir. Here, kitty, kitty." Parker's catchphrase is "Gee, I love that kind of talk" and he loves to cite naval regulations which he knows by heart, but somehow can never remember his serial number correctly.

In the episode titled "The Great Impersonation", Ensign Parker impersonates British General Smythe-Pelly (Conway in a dual role) in Nouméa, New Caledonia, where he dodges assassins while the actual general leads an invasion against Japanese forces. In another Conway dual role, Parker impersonates Admiral Chester "Rockpile" Beaty in "The Seven Faces of Ensign Parker." In "H.M.S. 73", Parker poses as a phony British rear admiral, Sir Reggie Grother-Smyth and impersonates British Admiral Clivedon Sommers in "The British Also Have Ensigns." From time to time, Parker is called upon to fool Captain Binghamton with a voice impersonation of President Franklin D. Roosevelt (Parker also does an impersonation of Roosevelt in McHale's Navy Joins the Air Force).

==== Captain Binghamton ====
Joe Flynn as Captain Wally Binghamton

Captain Wallace "Wally" Burton Binghamton USNR (Joe Flynn) – McHale's perpetually frustrated commanding officer, referred to as "Old Leadbottom" (usually behind his back—a nickname he received from a bullet wound to the posterior). He is a married naval reservist and his job before the war was as the commodore of a yacht club on Long Island and the editor of a yachting magazine. Cantankerous and cross, Binghamton often dreams of a promotion to admiral or occasionally military glory, but is much too inept, cowardly and a bit of a goof himself (early in the series, Binghamton is a rather serious officer, but becomes goofier as the series progresses).

Binghamton comes close to a promotion to Admiral Rogers' staff in "The Balloon Goes Up", but because Binghamton took too long in getting things squared away (because of McHale's crew), someone else gets the promotion. The one time Binghamton leads the PT-73 into battle, he only succeeds in "sinking" an enemy truck on land with a torpedo (a gag that was used in the Cary Grant film Operation Petticoat), based on an actual attack conducted by the USS Bowfin. (Note: The bus "sinking" took place during an attack at Minami Daito on August 9, 1944, when one of Bowfin's torpedoes hit a dock and blew a bus into the harbor.)

Binghamton is constantly trying to "get the goods" on "McHale and his pirates" to send them to prison or get them transferred and he comes close just about all the time, only to have McHale's crew get out of trouble, usually by having some kind of military success, through some form of blackmail (such as telling the admiral what really happened) or because Binghamton wants some kind of a favor from McHale. When he is not complaining about McHale and his crew to his superiors, Binghamton constantly tries to impress superior officers, VIPs or people with connections for personal gain—which usually backfires, making him look foolish.

As a running gag, Binghamton is forever being knocked down (usually by Parker or Carpenter) or covered with something messy (also usually because of Parker). Blind without his glasses, Binghamton also has his glasses knocked or taken off (to keep him from seeing something) a number of times. Occasionally, he is seen throwing darts at a picture of McHale. His catchphrases are: "What in the name of the Blue Pacific" or "What in the name of Nimitz (or Halsey)?" (as when he sees gambling or native dancing girls on McHale's Island) and "What is it, wha', wha', wha', what?!" (usually in response to McHale's "Well-a, well-a, well-a").

A running gag has a frustrated Binghamton looking up and saying, "Why me? Why is it always me?" (also used by Tinker in one episode) or "Somebody up there hates me!" His favorite catchphrase is "I could just scream!" which was once used by McHale, Carpenter and even Fuji. The only time Binghamton ever gets even with the PT-73 crew is in McHale's Navy Joins the Air Force when he orders the crew under the command of Ensign Parker to jump off a dock into the water. In the pilot episode, "An Ensign for McHale", the sign outside Binghamton's office reads "Capt. R.F. Binghamton, U.S.N.R." even though his name is later established to be Wallace Burton Binghamton.

In "McHale the Desk Commando", McHale learns what a tough job Binghamton has when he replaces Binghamton as base commander of Taratupa. This is done so Binghamton does not have to face tough-as-nails Admiral "Iron Pants" Rafferty (Philip Ober), who is inspecting naval installations (an episode with a young Raquel Welch as Lt. Wilson).

Sometimes, Binghamton tries to use legitimate means to get rid of McHale and/or his crew, although usually in an underhanded way. In "All Chiefs and No Indians", Binghamton tries to get the whole crew promoted to chief petty officers so they will be split up and reassigned. When they deliberately fail the exams after they find out what Binghamton is up to, he gives them all passing grades anyway. Another example is in the episode entitled "Little Red Riding Doctor", in which Don Knotts is Army psychiatrist Lt. Pratt, whom Binghamton tries to con into believing McHale's crew is suffering a terrible case of combat fatigue and should be sent back to the States.

==== Lieutenant Carpenter ====
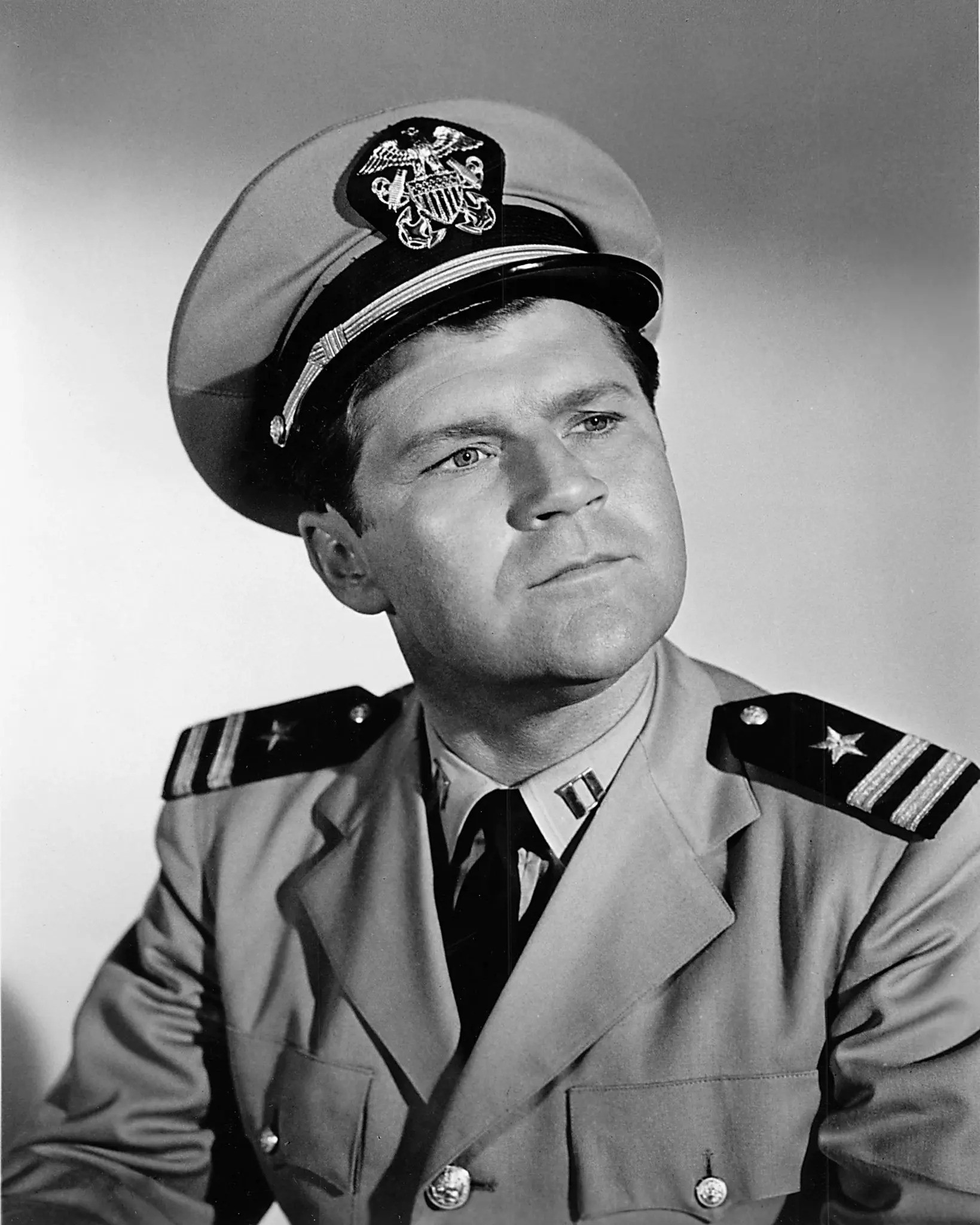
Bob Hastings as Lt. Elroy Carpenter

Lieutenant Elroy Carpenter (Bob Hastings, a veteran of Sergeant Bilko) – Binghamton's sycophantic bumbler aide who tries to be military, but is too inept to be taken seriously. He is slow to catch on and does not know when to keep his mouth shut. Like Parker, he often knocks down Binghamton, or causes Binghamton to be knocked down, because of his clumsiness and dimwittedness. However, again like Parker, Carpenter is also subjected to Binghamton's tirades. Early in the first season, Lt. Carpenter commands PT-116, but soon drifts into less responsibility. In McHale's Navy (1964), Carpenter says he is from Cleveland. In the spin-off movie McHale's Navy Joins the Air Force, Carpenter is in charge of PT-116, which is promptly sunk in the first few minutes of the movie.

==== PT-73 crew ====
Quartermaster George "Christy" Christopher (Gary Vinson, who also appeared in the dramatic pilot "Seven Against the Sea") – Whenever McHale is not personally steering the PT-73, it will be Christy at the helm. Besides Binghamton, he is the only married man and the only one with any children. Christy marries Lt. Gloria Winters (Cindy Robbins) early in the series in "Operation Wedding Party" and she moves to San Diego. They have a daughter not long afterwards in "The Big Raffle" episode. Because his crew helped them get married, their daughter is named Quintina Charlene Leslie Wilhelmina Harriet Virginia Hetty Fujiana after the crew (for Quinton, Charles, Lester, Willy, Harrison, Virgil, Happy and Fuji).

Radioman Willy Moss (John Wright, who also appeared in "Seven Against the Sea") – A good-natured Southerner from Tennessee who operates the crew's still and is in charge of radio and telephone communication for the crew. He also serves as the PT-73's sonar operator. In "The British Also Have Ensigns", he is revealed to have nine brothers and sisters.

Torpedoman's Mate Lester Gruber (Carl Ballantine) – A hustler and hack magician (Note: Ballantine entertained troops with his comedy and magic during World War II.) whose get-rich-quick schemes (such as promoting gambling and selling moonshine and war souvenirs) often get the crew in trouble (when the crew is not stealing supplies or equipment). Gruber hails from Brooklyn, worked in a used car sales lot, and frequently references the Brooklyn Dodgers and Ebbets Field.

Motor Machinist's Mate Harrison James "Tinker" Bell (Billy Sands, who played Pvt. Paparelli on Sergeant Bilko) – A top-notch mechanic who is in charge of keeping the PT-73 running.

Gunner's Mate Virgil Edwards (Edson Stroll) – A handsome and well-built lover boy who is a crack shot with a .50-caliber machine gun. According to the episode "The Truth Hurts", Virgil has been in the service at least six years.

Seaman Joseph "Happy" Haines (Gavin MacLeod, later of The Mary Tyler Moore Show and The Love Boat) – MacLeod left the series before the third season to appear in the movie The Sand Pebbles. He had also appeared in the 1959 film Operation Petticoat, which has a few similarities to McHale's Navy.

Note: In the first season, the crew members are on an equal social footing, but in later seasons, a "pecking order" is established with Gruber at the head, apparently the chief of the boat although three of the crewmen outrank him. Based on the "crows" (insignia of rank) on their dress white uniforms, Christy, Virgil, and Tinker are all petty officers, 1st class, Willy and Gruber are petty officers, 2nd class and Happy is a seaman (he does not wear a patch).

==== Fuji ====
Seaman 3rd Class Fujiwara Takeo Kobiaji, nicknamed "Fuji" (Yoshio Yoda) – Perhaps the most unusual character in the series, the lovable, boyish, Japanese prisoner of war and deserter from the Imperial Japanese Navy whom the PT-73 crew takes on as a de facto comrade and keeps hidden from Binghamton and almost everyone outside of McHale's gang. In the episode titled "A Letter for Fuji", his name is given as Fujiwara Takeo; in "The August Teahouse of Quint McHale" and the film McHale's Navy Joins the Air Force, it is given as Takeo Fujiwara. In a Japanese name, the family name precedes the given name.

Although Fuji is a member of the Japanese military and has a girlfriend in Japan (Mioshi, whom he finds out is married), his only loyalty is to the PT-73 crew and not the Japanese war effort. In the episodes "The Truth Hurts" and "The Vampire of Taratupa", Fuji is revealed to be from Yokohama. In the tag of one of the fourth season episodes set in Italy, he is revealed to have a second cousin who is a lieutenant in the 442nd Regimental Combat Team. In exchange for being given a safe house instead of imprisonment in a prisoner-of-war camp, Fuji gladly "serves time" as the crew's houseboy and cook at their camp on "McHale's Island."

Keeping Fuji's presence and identity a secret from Captain Binghamton and others is a running gag, with wacky consequences throughout the series. For instance, in the premiere episode ("An Ensign For McHale"), to avoid detection during an inspection by Binghamton, Fuji disguises himself and poses as a Polynesian chief, which Binghamton accepts despite initially questioning his Japanese appearance and Japanese accent. In the first episode set in Europe ("War, Italian Style"), he is passed off as a member of the 442nd Japanese-American Regiment, where he finds a second cousin through his mother's family of Kobayashi. In "The Mothers of PT-73" and "Orange Blossoms for McHale", he is presented as a Filipino houseboy. In "Fuji's Big Romance", he is a part-Hawaiian sailor.

Fuji is involved in a frequent scenario on the show. Whenever Binghamton is seen approaching the island unannounced, the crew converges on McHale for instructions. Naturally, the primary concern is to get Fuji out of sight before he is spotted. Invariably, the first order out of McHale's mouth is, "Fuji, head for the hills!" whereupon he takes off for the other side of the island. This scenario is played out so often, in one episode in the later seasons, McHale begins, "Fuji…" and Fuji finishes, "I know. Head for hills." Fuji's seemingly fluent yet awkward command of the English language serves as a comic device; particularly humorous is the unexpected and arbitrary use of American colloquialisms and ethnic phrases, all spoken with a thick Japanese accent—personal catchphrases include the Yiddish lament Oy vey and the Italian exclamation Mamma mia!. He fondly calls Commander McHale "Skippa-san" and Ensign Parker "Parka-san", incorporating the Japanese honorific san.

=== Other characters ===
==== Urulu ====
McHale (Borgnine) watches in fear as Urulu (Jacques Aubuchon) puts a curse on Binghamton.

Many of the episodes in the South Pacific involve interactions with native islanders. The most colorful is Polynesian chief and witchdoctor, Pali Urulu (Jacques Aubuchon), who is as shifty and scheming as McHale and his men. When McHale and the crew are in Urulu's village, the chief displays a portrait of President Franklin D. Roosevelt. When the Japanese troops arrive, Urulu turns it over to reveal a portrait of Japanese Emperor Hirohito. In another episode he does the same thing with the Japanese and American flags.

Though "primitive", Urulu is like Gruber, from whom he learns a lot, usually to Gruber's regret—a hustler who is always looking for ways to make money or swindle money from the Navy. In the episode titled "We Do the Voodoo", after Binghamton refuses to pay Urulu for damage to his coconut grove, Urulu uses his powers to put a curse on Binghamton, who then has a streak of bad luck. In "The Balloon Goes Up", Urulu displays the sign "Gone Headhunting" when he leaves his hut and is called a cannibal by Binghamton and McHale (no indication that it is meant to be taken literally). Aubuchon also played the Russian sailor Dimitri in McHale's Navy Joins the Air Force.

==== Big Frenchy ====
Another shifty character is Big Frenchy, played by George Kennedy in episodes titled "French Leave For McHale" and "The Return of Big Frenchy." He is a thieving French smuggler, captain of a small boat, and an old friend of McHale's who knows better than to turn his back to him. In "The Return of Big Frenchy", he convinces Binghamton and Parker that he is a member of the French Underground so he can steal supplies. Kennedy also played businessman Henri Le Clerc of New Caledonia in the 1964 movie. Kennedy began his career in showbiz as a technical adviser on the Sergeant Bilko show.

==== Senior officers ====
The show has its share of admirals. Admiral Rogers is played by Roy Roberts in 22 episodes. In some episodes, his first name is John, while in others, it is Bruce. Herbert Lytton played Admiral Roscoe G. Reynolds in 11 episodes. Bill Quinn played Benson, Slocum and Admiral Bruce Elliott in six episodes. Willis Bouchey played Admiral Hawkins in three episodes. Admiral Rafferty was played by Philip Ober in "McHale, the Desk Commando" and "McHale's Floating Laudromat".

Ted Knight played Admiral "Go-Go" Granger in "The Fountain of Youth" and "One of Our Engines is Missing", In "Uncle Admiral", Harry Von Zell played Ensign Parker's uncle, Vice Admiral Tim "Bull Dog" Parker. Simon Scott played General Bronson nine times when the show is in Italy. Henry Beckman as U.S. Army Colonel Harrigan was also a regular presence in the Italian episodes as Binghamton's superior and also a thorn in Binghamton's side—as a schemer, Harrigan is sometimes on McHale's side, sometimes on Binghamton's side, or plays one against the other as best suits his purposes. Beckman also played Air Corps Colonel Pratt in McHale's Navy Joins the Air Force.

==== Multiple character roles ====
Peggy Mondo played several roles in the series. She played the heavyset daughter of a Polynesian chief, Little Flower, who is always looking for a husband such as Ensign Parker or even Binghamton. Mondo also played Fifi in "French Leave for McHale" and a few episodes as Mama Giovanni and Rosa Giovanni when the crew is in Italy. Stanley Adams played a native chief, the Shah of Durani, and political boss Frank Templeton in the last episode "Wally for Congress." Richard Jury played Lt. Plowright in "Parents Anonymous" and a goofy dentist in "The Novocain Mutiny." Both Syl Lamont, who played Yeoman Tate and Clay Tanner, who played a Marine guard, appeared in the series a number of times.

Tony Franke appeared in the series several times and as Sgt. Frank Tresh in the movie McHale's Navy Joins the Air Force. Dick Wilson played Voltafiori citizen and partner of the mayor, Dino Baroni. Walter Brooke and Nelson Olmstead each played several different naval officers. Among the actors who repeatedly played Japanese soldiers and sailors are Dale Kino (who also played a Nisei sergeant), John Fujioka, and Mako (who starred in the movie The Sand Pebbles, for which MacLeod left the series).

==== Guest stars ====
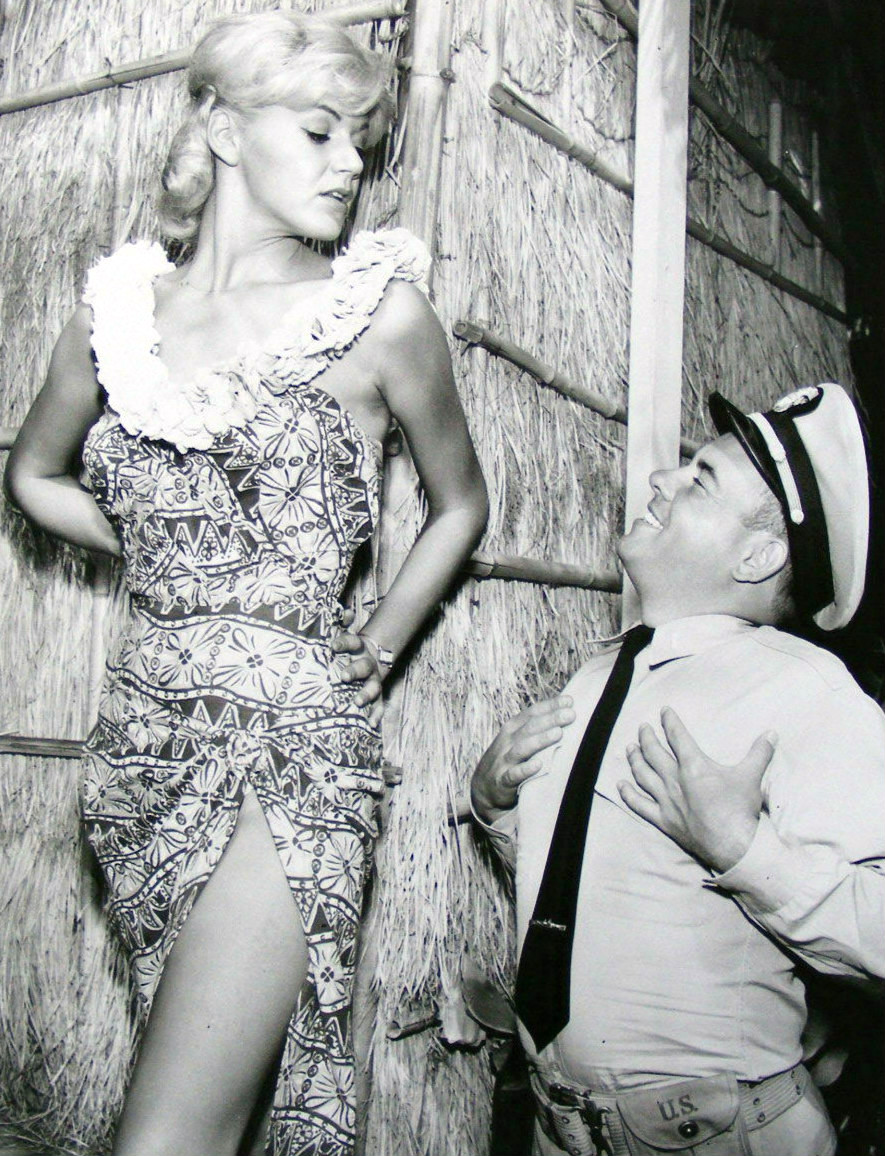
A publicity photo for "McHale's Paradise Hotel" – (Barbara Lyon and Tim Conway)

In "The Missing Link", Marlo Thomas played Binghamton's niece, Cynthia Prentice, who takes an interest in Ensign Parker, although it turns out entirely for anthropological reasons. In "Camera, Action, Panic", Arte Johnson played the bumbling Cameraman Sweeney who is making a movie of the PT-73 crew in action. In "Is There a Doctor in the Hut", Bernie Kopell (who starred with MacLeod on The Love Boat) played Colonel Pryer, who is the obnoxious manager of movie star Rita Howard, played by Lisa Seagram. In "Hello McHale? Colonna!" McHale finagles to have comic Jerry Colonna do an unscheduled Special Services show. Pat Harrington Jr. played the thieving Guido Panzini in "McHale's Country Club Caper".

Steve Franken played the snooty Lt. Jason Whitworth III in "Birth of a Salesman", whom Binghamton hopes will give him a job selling insurance after the war. George Furth played the self-centered Roger Whitfield III, who tries to take advantage of Binghamton's hopes to get his old job back at the yacht club owned by Whitfield's father in "Dart Gun Wedding". Marvin Kaplan played the MIT electronics genius Ensign Eugene J. Kwazniak in "All Ahead, Empty", in which the PT-73 is wired for remote control. Bernard Fox played the clumsy Sub-Lieutenant Cedric Clivedon in "The British Also Have Ensigns." Susan Silo played Virgil's stowaway girlfriend Babette in "Babette, Go Home". Jesse Pearson played singing idol Harley Hatfield in "The Rage of Taratupa".

In "Make Room for Orvie", Michael Burns played 18-year-old Seaman Orvie Tuttle, who is the newest member of the PT-73 crew, but who does not go with the crew when they move to Italy in the next episode. Ann McCrea was cast as Carol Kimberly in "Beauty and the Beast" (1963). In "The Comrades of 73", in which the PT-73 is slated to be sent to the Soviet Union as part of Lend Lease, Sue Ane Langdon played Russian commander Krasni and Cliff Norton played Russian admiral Gurevitch (Norton also played an Australian sergeant major in the 1964 movie and Major Bill Grady in McHale's Navy Joins the Air Force).

==== PT-73 crew love life ====
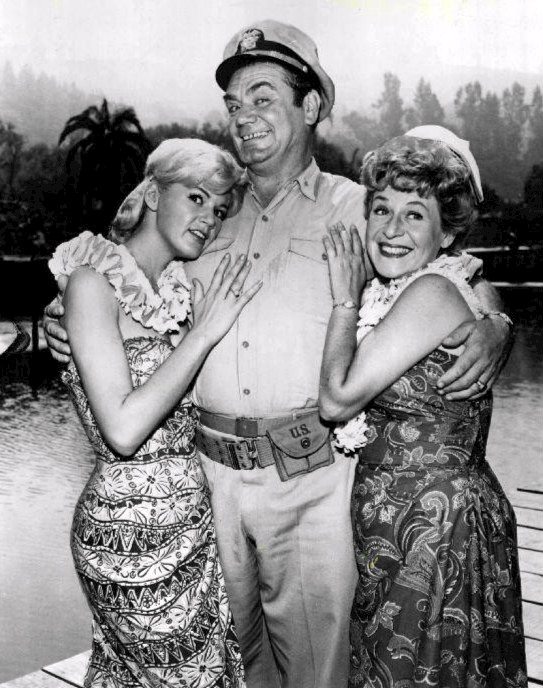
"McHale's Paradise Hotel", Barbara Lyon, Ernest Borgnine and Jane Dulo

McHale's always hopeful love interest while the show is in the South Pacific is Navy Nurse Molly Turner (Jane Dulo from Sergeant Bilko), a New Jersey gal who is always trying to corner the ever romantically elusive McHale. Another love interest of the reluctant McHale is an old friend and a bit of a wildcat Kate O'Hara (Joyce Jameson). At first, his crew tries to get McHale interested in her, then Kate tries to blackmail McHale into marrying her and then Binghamton tries to blackmail her into marrying McHale when she tries to back out herself. Yet another love interest of the always reluctant McHale is Maggie Monohan (Jean Willes) in "The Return of Maggie", the owner of a gambling joint in New Caledonia and an old flame of McHale's who wants him back, but he does not want her back. Willes played a very similar role as Margot Monet in the 1964 movie. Willes also played Congresswoman Clara Carter Clarke in "Send Us a Hero."

Though painfully shy around women, Ensign Parker's love interest in the South Pacific is Yvette Gerard, a lovely French girl from a nearby island played by Claudine Longet (who also played an almost identical character, Andrea Bouchard of New Caledonia, in the 1964 movie). In "A Medal for Parker", his girlfriend back home in Chagrin Falls is Mary (Kathleen Gately), who is more interested in dating a war hero than Parker.

While the very bashful Parker is shy around women, women are not always shy around Parker, such as in "The Happy Sleepwalker" when Lt. Nancy Culpepper (Sheila James) finds Parker irresistible. In "The Vampire of Taratupa", Parker dates Lt. Melba Benson (Ann Elder), who is as big a klutz as he is. In the episode entitled "36-24-73", situated in Italy, hints are given of a relationship developing between Parker and by-the-book female Ensign Sandra Collins (Maura McGiveney) after he sternly corrects her about in what sections certain regulations are (they then talk about what regulations are their favorites).

Along with other WAVES clad in bathing suits, they provide valuable (albeit totally unwitting) assistance in capturing a German U-boat when its captain runs the U-boat aground trying to get a better look. McGiveney also played the part of Judy in "The Stool Parrot" episode. Although the crew (especially the lover-boy Virgil) is forever chasing women (Navy nurses, native island girls or local Italian women), certain women gain their interest more than others. After receiving a "Dear John letter", shy and broken-hearted Willy's love interest becomes Southern belle Nurse Cindy Bates (Brenda Wright). Tinker tries to impress and win over fickle Nurse Betsy Gordonlove (Barbara Werle) in "Scuttlebutt."

Happy's love interest in "The Happy Sleepwalker" is Lt. Anne Wright (Lois Roberts). When Gruber's girlfriend Ginger (Jean Hale) shows up to surprise him in "Lester, the Skipper", McHale is talked into letting Gruber pretend he is the commander of the PT-73 while she is there. In "Fuji's Big Romance", the lonely prisoner of war falls for lovely Sulani (Yvonne Ribuca), the daughter of a Polynesian chief, when the crew sympathetically takes him along on one of their social outings to a luau with the native islanders. Other than Binghamton and Christy, none of the regular characters on the show is married and only Christy has any children.

=== Cast ===
The cast of the half-hour sitcom series was as listed below. Except where noted, the actors appeared on the show in every season.

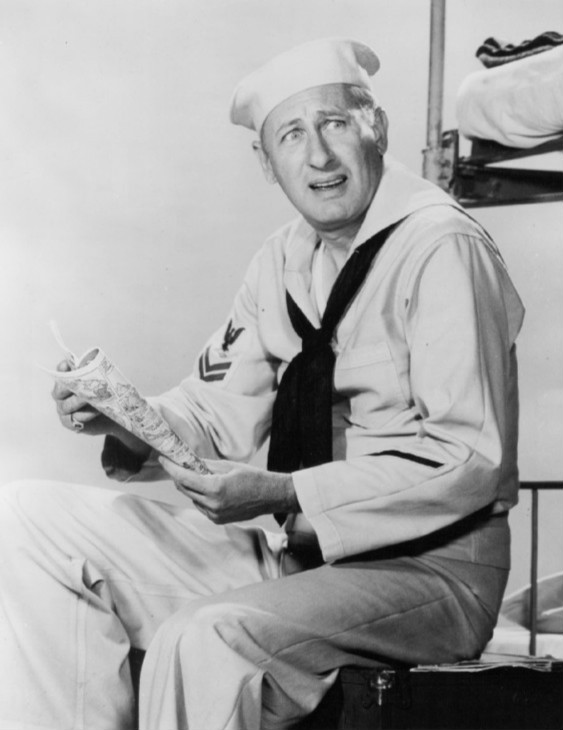
Carl Ballantine as Lester Gruber

- Ernest Borgnine as Lieutenant Commander Quinton McHale
- Tim Conway as Ensign Charles Parker
- Joe Flynn as Captain Wallace Burton Binghamton ("Old Leadbottom")
- Bob Hastings as Lieutenant Elroy Carpenter
- Gary Vinson as George "Christy" Christopher, quartermaster
- John Wright as Willy Moss, radioman
- Carl Ballantine as Lester Gruber, torpedoman's mate
- Billy Sands as Harrison "Tinker" Bell, engineman and motor machinist's mate
- Edson Stroll as Virgil Edwards, gunner's mate
- Gavin MacLeod as Joseph "Happy" Haines, seaman (1962–1964)
- Yoshio Yoda as Fuji Kobiaji, (Note: In season 2, episode 13 ("A Letter for Fuji"), he is given the name Fujiwara Takeo.) cook, seaman 3rd class, Japanese POW

=== The real-life PT-73 ===
The real-life PT-73 was finished on August 12, 1942, by Higgins Industries, in New Orleans. It was 78 feet (24 m) long, weighed 56 tons and had a top speed of 40 knots. It was assigned to Motor Torpedo Boat Squadron 13 under the command of Commander James B. Denny, USN. The squadron participated in the Aleutian Islands Campaign from March 1943 to May 1944. The squadron was then transferred to the Southwest Pacific, where it saw action at Mios Woendi, Dutch New Guinea; Mindoro, Philippine Islands; and Brunei Bay, Borneo.

The squadron was also based for a time at Dreger Harbor, New Guinea, and San Pedro Bay, Philippine Islands, but saw no action from these bases. Overall, the real PT-73 did not have the kind of illustrious combat record depicted in the series. On January 15, 1945, it ran aground off Lubang Island in the Philippine Islands after delivering supplies to Filipino guerrillas and was destroyed by the crew to prevent it from falling into enemy hands.

== Production ==
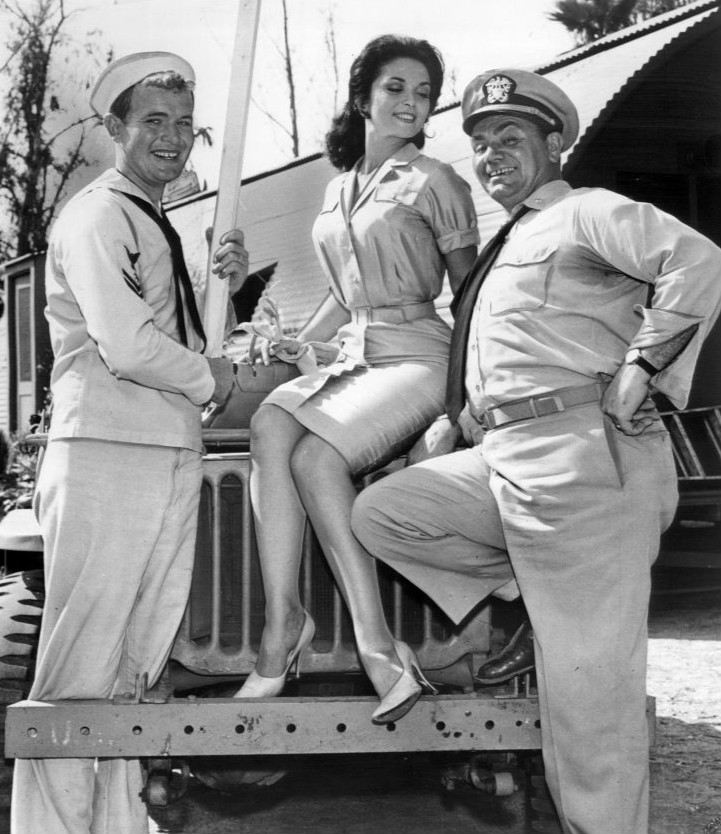
Gary Vinson, Lisa Seagram and Borgnine

The Pacific Ocean naval base stood on the back lot of Universal Studios. For years after the show went off the air, the sets were an attraction on the studio tour. The portion of the Universal Studios tour involving Bruce the Shark from Jaws attacking the tourist tram takes place on McHale's Lagoon, according to the tour guides.

=== PT-73 ===
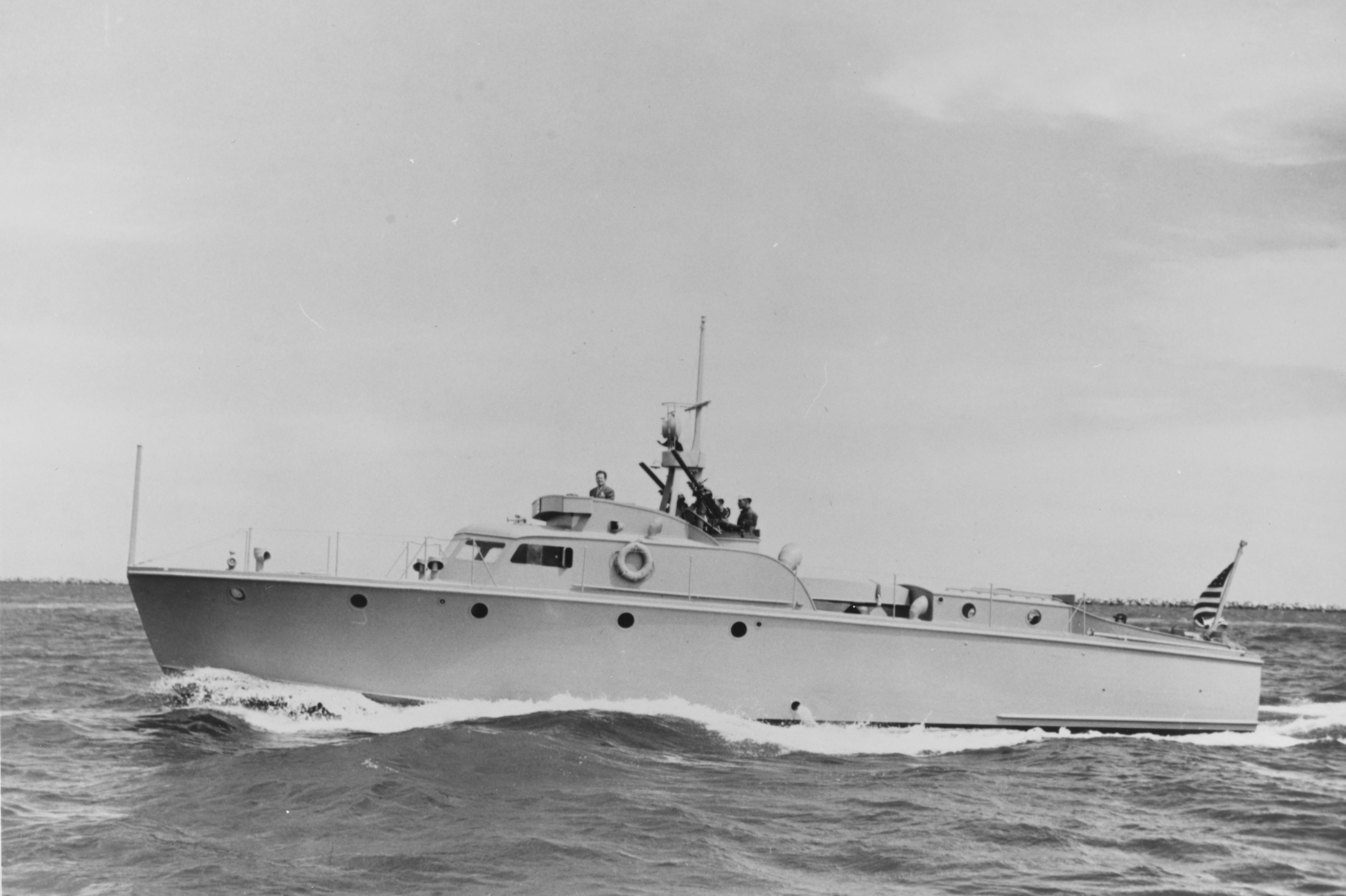
A 63-foot (19 m) World War II air-sea rescue boat

Few PT boats survived World War II, almost all having been sold, stripped, or destroyed after the war by various governments. This made sourcing an appropriate boat for the television series challenging.

Three different vessels were used to portray PT-73 in the show: a converted 71-foot (22 m) type II Vosper MTB (motor torpedo boat), a British design built in the U.S. for export to the Soviet Union, was used for shots at sea; and two 63-foot (19 m) World War II air-sea rescue boats were reconfigured above-deck to resemble the reconfigured Vosper and based at Universal Studios.

The war had ended in August 1945 before the Vosper, hull number PT-694, could be sent to the Soviet Union. It was purchased by Howard Hughes for a chase boat for the only flight of his Spruce Goose aircraft. Universal purchased the boat.

Significant liberties were taken reconfiguring the Vosper 694 and the two air-sea rescue boats to resemble a World War II-era PT boat. These included:

- The Vosper's charthouse and bridge configuration were kept.
- Gun turrets were added to both sides of the charthouse about where they would have been on a stock Vosper 71-foot, but this was not the configuration of the 80-foot (24 m) Elco boats, but mimicked the Higgins 78' PT-71 Class boats.
- On McHale's boat, each gun turret mounted a single M2 heavy machine gun on an external, tubular steel spindle fed from a 100-round .50 caliber ammunition box, whereas the real boats used two M2s in Mk-17 gun mount / Mk-9 gun carriage combinations that rotated within the body of the turret and had integral ammunition magazines and feed systems holding 250 rounds in disintegrating belts for each gun.
- The turrets in the show also did away with the wrap-around safety cages that kept the .50 cal gunners from accidentally firing into the boat during the heat of combat.
- A single .50 caliber M2 mounted on an M4 autocannon-style pipe stand tended to appear, disappear, and move around from scene to scene on the forward deck. Normally, the forward gun would have been an either an .50 caliber M2 heavy machine gun or Oerlikon 20-mm antiaircraft cannon on a pedestal to the right of centerline, back nearer the charthouse, and possibly a 37-mm M4 autocannon mounted on the foredeck.
- A pseudo-"radar" unit and mast was added aft of midhull, where normally an Mk-4 Oerlikon 20-mm single antiaircraft cannon was mounted. The mast on the PT-73's command-bridge was also incorrect.
- The 40-mm Bofors cannon or pedestal-mounted Oerlikon 20-mm antiaircraft cannon usually found on the aft deck was done away with completely, as was one of the engine compartment ventilator housings and the M2 smoke screen generator.
- Two mock-ups of US Navy 21-inch (530 mm) MK-18, swing-out, torpedo tubes (as carried on the early war 80-foot Elco boats like the PT-109) replacing the MK-7/8 tubes normally carried by the Vosper 71-foot.
- The gunwale side cut-outs normally seen on the Vosper, were built-up forward of the cabin, creating a flush forward deck. Normally, the Vosper required forward clearance in front of the Mk 7/8 tubes when torpedoes were fired over the gunwale.
- Shots of the crew aboard the PT-73 were usually staged on a full-scale mock-up of the bridge and gun tubs in front of a front projection screen at Universal.

The final known film appearance of any PT-73 was of one of the converted 63-foot air-sea rescue boats in the 1970s show Emergency! ("Quicker Than the Eye", season 4, episode 8, aired: November 9, 1974). Per the storyline: Station 51 was dispatched to a movie studio to rescue a man trapped beneath a boat; the boat in question was being moved from one end of the studio to another by truck, and wooden supports holding it had broken and trapped a man underneath. As seen in the episode, shadowed lettering of "PT-73" is visible on the bow of the boat, which was missing its pilot house, masts, and depth charges. (Note: See photo captioned, in part, "Engine 51, from Emergency TV series, sits in position.")

No record of the final fate of either converted 63-foot air-sea rescue boat has been found.

The sea-going PT-73 (the ex-Howard Hughes PT-694 Vosper boat) was sold in 1966 to a private owner, (Note: Navsource names the private owner of the former PT-694 as "Hal Crozer", but mid-1970s newspaper accounts name the owner as "Harold Crozier".) and converted to a sport-fishing boat. In 1992, the boat was destroyed when it broke from its mooring near Santa Barbara and washed up on the beach during a storm.

== Spinoff ==
Producer Edward Montagne set up a female version of McHale's Navy entitled Broadside, which ran for 32 episodes on ABC during the 1964–65 television season. In place of the PT crew were a group of WAVES led by Lt. Anne Morgan (Kathleen Nolan). She and her motor pool personnel Joan Staley, Sheila James, Lois Roberts. and Jimmy Boyd (as a male with a female name), were up against base commander Edward Andrews and his nervous adjutant George Furth, who guest-starred in an episode of McHale's Navy entitled "Dart Gun Wedding." Dick Sargent provided a love interest for Nolan.

Edward Andrews (as "Eddie Andrews") had appeared in Edward Montagne's military sitcom The Phil Silvers Show (Sergeant Bilko). Montagne remembered him and co-starred him in Broadside. "The amusing thing is that Ed Montagne first offered me the Captain Binghamton role in his McHale's Navy and I turned him down," said Andrews in 1965. "After seeing what a wonderful job Joe Flynn is doing with the role, I keep kicking myself for what was apparently a stupid decision. [Broadside] is roughly a distaff version of McHale's Navy."

Although not an actual spinoff, Tim Conway and Joe Flynn teamed up playing characters with similar personalities in The Tim Conway Show, which lasted only 13 episodes in 1970.

== Merchandise and other media ==
Dell Comics published three issues of a comic adaptation in 1963. There was also a Dell comic adaptation of the first film in 1964.

A board game, McHale's Navy Game, was published by Transogram in 1962. A trading card set was published by Fleer in 1965.

Years after the show ended, Borgnine and Conway played the SpongeBob SquarePants superhero team Mermaid Man and Barnacle Boy.

== Theatrical films ==
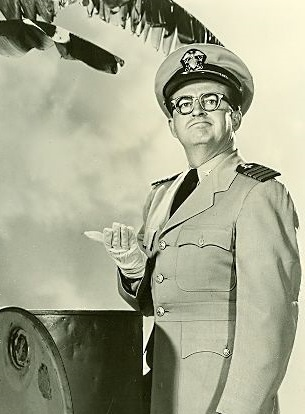
Joe Flynn as Captain Binghamton

Two feature film spin-offs were based on the series: McHale's Navy (1964) and McHale's Navy Joins the Air Force (1965). The ensemble cast appeared in both films, but Borgnine and Ballantine were absent from the second film; Borgnine was not available due to schedule conflicts with the filming of The Flight of the Phoenix; why Ballantine was missing is not known. To beef up the crew, MacLeod, who had left the series, returned for this appearance. In a Cinema Retro interview, Borgnine said that Montagne wanted to make the film cheaply, without him, and would not show him the script. Both films have the same basic plot scheme as the series in the South Pacific and, in many ways, were merely extensions of the series. Even parts of the filming location for New Caledonia in the first movie are identical to episodes from the series.

The seagoing PT-73 was extensively filmed running between San Pedro and Catalina Island's Avalon harbor, which stood in for the fictional town where the show was set. The first film did well at the box office, but the latter film (without Borgnine) was not as successful and was derided by critics as having too much slapstick comedy, though others praised it for satirizing of military incompetence (after a typical screw-up, the Japanese POW Fuji sighs, "Beats me how they beating us."). William Lederer, who co-authored the second film with John Fenton Murray, used scenes lifted directly from his comic novel, All the Ships at Sea.

Unlike the television series, both movies were filmed in Technicolor. McHale's Navy (1964) earned an estimated $2,250,000 ($23.4 million in 2025) in North American rentals. (Note: Note that this figure is rentals accruing to distributors, not total gross.) McHale's Navy Joins the Air Force took in $1,500,000 ($15.3 million in 2025).

In 1997, a sequel was released, also named McHale's Navy. It starred Tom Arnold as McHale's son, a United States Naval Academy graduate. The film showed the PT-73 and its crew operating in a modern, post-World War II setting in the Caribbean. Borgnine has a cameo appearance as the senior McHale, commanding rear admiral of what appears to be the United States Naval Special Warfare Command and going by the code name "Cobra."

== Home media ==
Shout! Factory has released all four seasons of McHale's Navy on DVD in Region 1. In November 2015, Shout! released McHale's Navy – The Complete Series on DVD in Region 1. The 21-disc set contained all 138 episodes and both theatrical films in special collectible packaging. In Australia, Madman Entertainment released all four seasons on DVD. Madman released the first three seasons in Australia in August 2009, in Slimline packaging, replacing the original releases, which were box sets. In June 2011, a Slimline-packaged set of season 4 was seen in Big W stores in Australia in Region 4, however, no details indicate the item being available elsewhere. All full episodes are now available on YouTube.

DVD Name	Ep #	Release dates	
DVD Name	Ep #	Region 1	Region 4
Season 1	36	March 20, 2007	August 16, 2007
Season 2	36	September 11, 2007	November 8, 2007
Season 3	36	March 18, 2008	August 6, 2008
Season 4	30	November 18, 2008	May 20, 2009
Complete Series	138	November 17, 2015	N/A
