= Snow White and the Three Stooges =

1961 film by Walter Lang

- Theatrical release poster
- Directed by: Walter Lang
- Screenplay by: Noel Langley; Elwood Ullman
- Story by: Charles Wick
- Based on: Snow White by The Brothers Grimm
- Produced by: Charles Wick
- Starring: Carol Heiss; Edson Stroll; Patricia Medina; Guy Rolfe; Michael David
- Cinematography: Leon Shamroy
- Edited by: Jack W. Holmes
- Music by: Earl Brent; Harry Harris
- Color process: DeLuxe Color
- Distributed by: 20th Century Fox
- Release date: May 26, 1961 (U.S.)
- Running time: 107:21
- Country: United States
- Language: English
- Budget: $3,500,000
- Box office: $1.6 million

Snow White and the Three Stooges is a 1961 American comedy fantasy film. It is the second feature film to star the Three Stooges after their 1959 resurgence in popularity. By this time, the trio consisted of Moe Howard, Larry Fine, and "Curly Joe" DeRita. Released by 20th Century Fox, this was the trio's take on the classic fairy tale Snow White. The film was retitled Snow White and the Three Clowns in the United Kingdom. This was Walter Lang‘s final directing film before his retirement.

Olympic gold medalist figure skater Carol Heiss starred as Snow White, a princess who must flee her home after her evil stepmother the queen wishes her to be dead. Seeking refuge in the cottage of the seven dwarfs, she accidentally meets the Stooges, who are house sitting for them while they are away.

== Plot ==
In the kingdom of Fortunia, a narrative unfolds, blending elements of fairy tale and adventure. Following the tragic loss of his beloved queen during childbirth, the noble king remarries, uniting with a beautiful yet malevolent queen who harbors envy towards her stepdaughter, Snow White, for her unparalleled beauty. As Snow White matures, tragedy strikes anew with the untimely demise of her father on her 17th birthday, leading the wicked queen to imprison her stepdaughter out of jealousy.

Fearing for her life, Snow White narrowly escapes a hired assassin's clutches and seeks refuge in the dwelling of the seven dwarfs, accompanied by the Three Stooges and their ward, Quatro. Unbeknownst to them, Quatro is in fact Prince Charming, although his true identity remains concealed due to memory loss after running into and hitting his head on a rock when the Stooges rescued him from the assassin. Romance blossoms between Snow White and Quatro, but their happiness is short-lived as the queen's machinations escalate, leading to Quatro's kidnapping. In a daring rescue attempt, the Stooges, disguised as cooks, endeavor to save Quatro but are forced to flee with Snow White upon his presumed demise. Amidst these events, a wish-granting magic sword falls into their possession, inadvertently propelling them out of the country. Meanwhile, the queen, learning of Snow White's survival, embarks on a vengeful pursuit.

Tragedy strikes once more as Snow White succumbs to a poisoned apple administered by the queen, but the villainess meets her demise inadvertently at the hands of the Stooges. With their resources depleted, the Stooges place Snow White on a bed instead of burying her, inadvertently invoking the assistance of the magic mirror.

In a race against time, Prince Charming, aided by the mirror's guidance, arrives just in time to dispel the effects of the poisoned apple, leading to the demise of the evil queen and her accomplice. With justice served and love prevailing, Snow White and Prince Charming unite in marriage, bringing a happily ever after to the kingdom of Fortunia.

== Cast ==
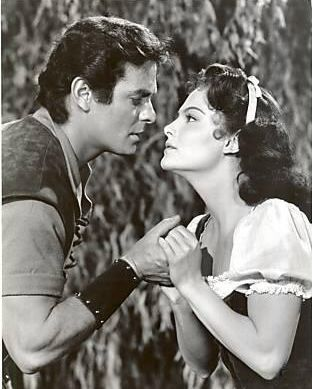
Prince Charming (Edson Stroll) and Snow White (Carol Heiss)

- Moe Howard as Moe
- Larry Fine as Larry
- Joe DeRita as Curly Joe
- Carol Heiss as Snow White
  - Leslie Farrell as Snow White At Age 4 (uncredited)
    - Robbi Lalonde as Snow White As A Child (uncredited)
- Edson Stroll as Quatro / Prince Charming
  - Craig Cooke as Young Prince Charming (uncredited)
- Patricia Medina as The Evil Queen / Witch
- Guy Rolfe as Count Oga
- Michael David as Rolf
- Buddy Baer as Hordred
- Edgar Barrier as King Augustus
- Peter Coe as Captain
- Mel Blanc as The Voice of Quinto The Puppet (uncredited)
- Paul Frees as The Narrator and The Voice of The Magic Mirror (uncredited)

== Production ==
Frank Tashlin was originally set to direct the film at a budget of $750,000 ($8,080,457 today). Fox then replaced him with Walter Lang, who had previously directed the Stooges in 1933's Meet the Baron. Lang transformed the film into a lavish epic with a budget of $3.5 million ($37,708,797 today), making it the most expensive film the Stooges ever starred in. The film was produced and co-written by future U.S. Information Agency head Charles Z. Wick.

Carol Heiss' uncredited singing voice was dubbed by Norma Zimmer (of Lawrence Welk fame).

Edson Stroll's singing voice was dubbed by Bill Lee.

Patricia Medina later recalled that Carol Heiss repeatedly tried to get her fired from the film.

== Reception ==
Snow White and the Three Stooges faced commercial disappointment despite considerable financial investment. As the sole Stooge feature of the 1960s shot in color, it encountered minimal audience engagement, emerging as the least favored installment among the Stooges' cinematic endeavors. Critics voiced discontent over several aspects of the film, notably the limited screen time allotted to the trio and the absence of their trademark slapstick humor. Compounding the financial setback, the film's target demographic primarily comprised children, who were admitted at a nominal fee of fifty cents per ticket. Consequently, the film's revenue potential was severely curtailed, necessitating an unattainably large audience of over 15 million minors for the production to achieve mere cost recovery. Notably, Moe Howard himself characterized the film as "a Technicolor mistake," highlighting the prevailing sentiment regarding its lackluster reception and financial performance.

The film, however, was nominated for the Writers Guild of America award for Best Musical Screenplay for 1961.

== See also ==
- List of American films of 1961
- List of films about witchcraft
