= Caprice (1967 film) =

1967 film by Frank Tashlin

- Theatrical release poster
- Directed by: Frank Tashlin
- Screenplay by: Jay Jayson; Frank Tashlin
- Story by: Martin Hale; Jay Jayson
- Produced by: Aaron Rosenberg; Martin Melcher; Martin Hale
- Starring: Doris Day; Richard Harris; Ray Walston
- Cinematography: Leon Shamroy
- Edited by: Robert L. Simpson
- Music by: Frank De Vol
- Color process: DeLuxe Color
- Production company: Melcher-Arcola Productions
- Distributed by: 20th Century-Fox
- Release date: April 18, 1967
- Running time: 98 minutes
- Country: United States
- Language: English
- Budget: $4.5 million
- Box office: $4 million

Caprice is a 1967 American comedy thriller film directed and co-written by Frank Tashlin and starring Doris Day and Richard Harris. It was Day's second and last film with Tashlin, after the previous year's The Glass Bottom Boat. This film and In Like Flint (1967) were the last movies made in CinemaScope, with most studios moving to Panavision and other widescreen processes.

== Plot ==
Patricia Foster, an industrial designer for Femina Cosmetics, owned by Sir Jason Fox, is arrested for trying to sell a secret deodorant formula. She is fired from Femina and hired by Matthew Cutter, owner of rival company May Fortune. This is actually a scheme devised by Sir Jason for Patricia to steal the formula for a new water-repellent hairspray, invented by Dr Stuart Clancy, May Fortune's chief cosmetic chemist.

Christopher White, Cutter's right-hand man, tells Patricia that he, too, secretly works for Sir Jason. Patricia visits the apartment of Su Ling, Clancy's secretary, and finds her unconscious on the floor. She takes a sample of the powder lying on her table. Patricia also finds a bottle of the hairspray and takes it with her. Christopher catches Patricia and threatens to tell Sir Jason that her real name is Felippa Fowler. He tells her that he is actually working for the CIA.

Patricia is the daughter of Robert Fowler, an Interpol agent who was murdered while skiing in Switzerland on the trail of a narcotics ring. She is trying to find his killer. Breaking the hairspray bottle she sees that it is an expensive Swiss one not used by Cutter. Christopher says that Clancy has Swiss connections – he was married to a Swiss woman and has children living in Switzerland. He was also a competitive skier.

Patricia goes to Switzerland and finds Madame Piasco – Clancy's mother-in-law – who is the actual expert who invented the formula. She gives a bottle to Patricia for free, stating that May Fortune now has the distribution rights and it will soon be on the American market.

Patricia goes skiing on the same hill where Robert died and comes under fire from a masked skier. Arriving in a helicopter, Christopher rescues her. Patricia realizes that neither Christopher nor Sir Jason were ever after the hairspray. Clancy used to be the chief cosmetics chemist for Sir Jason but was an utter failure at it, and Sir Jason's true goal was to discover and hire the chemical mastermind behind Clancy, whose identity he still does not know. Regardless, Patricia plans to give the hairspray to Sir Jason, which was her agreed mission. Christopher and Patricia profess their love for each other, but he requests one more job from her concerning Sir Jason.

Later, Christopher secretly records Patricia while she speaks to Clancy. She offers Clancy a job as Femina's head chemist, with an illegal under-the-table bonus. Clancy declines, saying that Cutter already knows about Piasco, and if Cutter does not care, he is happy where he is. At his office, Cutter watches the film of this encounter. He tells Christopher that this footage will ruin Sir Jason.

Patricia visits Sir Jason, who tells her he convinced Piasco to come and work for him. Patricia finds this incredible. Sir Jason also mentions the analysis of the black powder, which contains a narcotic. Patricia already had the powder analyzed herself. This other analysis was a test to see if he would tell the truth or lie, the latter of which would implicate him in Robert's murder. Sir Jason reveals that Cutter's sent the film to the police, who are now after her for bribery.

As the police arrive, Christopher snatches Patricia away. He admits that he works for Interpol. Patricia tells Interpol that the narcotics were smuggled as May Fortune face powder, which was harmless until incinerated, when it turned into a hallucinogen. Nobody believes that Cutter is smart enough to be the head of the narcotics ring.

Donning a microphone to Interpol while searching through Cutter's Paris office, Patricia tells an arriving cleaning lady that she need not clean there. The lady turns out to be Clancy in disguise, with a gun – he was Robert's killer. Patricia fights Clancy, who is shot and dies. Sir Jason, the co-conspirator of the narcotics ring, arrives wielding a gun against Patricia. With Clancy dead, Sir Jason will have the cosmetics market all to himself. He forces Patricia into a helicopter and takes off. Christopher shoots him while Patricia flies the helicopter back to Paris and lands it atop the Eiffel Tower. She and Christopher end the film together.

== Cast ==
- Doris Day as Patricia Foster
- Richard Harris as Christopher White
- Ray Walston as Dr. Stuart Clancy
- Jack Kruschen as Matthew Cutter
- Edward Mulhare as Sir Jason Fox
- Lilia Skala as Madame Piasco
- Irene Tsu as Su Ling
- Larry D. Mann as Inspector Kapinsky
- Maurice Marsac as Auber
- Michael Romanoff as Butler
- Lisa Seagram as Mandy
- Michael J. Pollard as Barney

Arthur Godfrey, who played the father of Doris Day in Tashlin's previous comedy, The Glass Bottom Boat, plays her father once again but is only seen in a photograph.

== Production ==
In February 1966 John Cohn, who co wrote the film, was announced as producer. Filming started in May.

== Reception ==
=== Box office ===
The 20th Century Fox release was a box office bomb, failing to place in the top 20 movies for 1967. According to Fox records, the film needed to earn $7,200,000 in rentals to break even and made $4,580,000, meaning it lost money.

=== Critical ===
Film critic Leonard Maltin’s review gave the film zero stars and said it was a "terrible vehicle for Doris." In The New York Times, Bosley Crowther called the film "a jumble of wacky and feeble comedy." Roger Ebert was more amused, writing that "When everything has been said and done, you really have to stand back and admire the sheer professional competence of the people who make Doris Day movies ... If her movies never go anywhere, at least they don't take all day about it. They're directed with a light touch, skillfully edited, and get it over with in no time."

In her memoir, Day recounts an argument she had with her manager-husband Martin Melcher over the script for Caprice, unaware he had signed her name to the contracts before she had the chance to say no. On the DVD commentary, authors Pierre Patrick and John Cork discuss the ways the screenplay was rewritten, ostensibly to please the star. They speculated that recent interest in Tashlin's signature mixture of slapstick, satire, and adventure—coupled with its Mod design—has acquired renewed respect from film buffs and, possibly, from Day herself. Several writers have commented on the "meta" moment in which Doris Day "dashes into a movie theater, where the movie Caprice is playing."

== Music ==
The title theme sung by Doris Day was released as the flip-side to her final single release on the Columbia Records label, the A-side being a more uptempo number, "Sorry."

== Adaptations ==
The screenplay by Jay Jayson and Tashlin was novelized by Julia Withers and was published in paperback by Dell in February, 1967.

== Home media ==
Initially only released on VHS in the UK, the movie was eventually released in a deluxe edition Region 1 DVD in January 2007 in widescreen and includes several extra features.

== See also ==
- List of American films of 1967
