= 2000 Years Later =

1969 film

- Theatrical release poster
- Directed by: Bert Tenzer
- Screenplay by: Bert Tenzer
- Produced by: Bert Tenzer
- Starring: Terry-Thomas; Edward Everett Horton; Pat Harrington, Jr. Lisa Seagram; John Abbott; John Myhers
- Cinematography: Mario DiLeo
- Edited by: Donn Cambern
- Music by: Stu Phillips
- Production company: Warner Bros.-Seven Arts
- Distributed by: Warner Bros.-Seven Arts
- Release date: March 11, 1969
- Running time: 80 minutes
- Country: United States
- Language: English

2000 Years Later (also known as Two Thousand Years Later) is a 1969 American comedy film written and directed by Bert Tenzer and starring Terry-Thomas, Edward Everett Horton, Pat Harrington, Jr., Lisa Seagram, John Abbott and John Myhers. It was released by Warner Bros.-Seven Arts on March 11, 1969.

== Plot ==
A satire on American pop culture and its obsession with fads, 2000 Years Later imagines what might happen if the latest craze sweeping the U.S. was a return to Ancient Roman values.

The idea reaches the public as a tongue-in-cheek gimmick on a late-night television program, The International Culture Hour, and quickly spirals into a full-blown cultural phenomenon. Soon, everyone—from long-haired pop stars to U.S. senators, from motorcycle gangs to Pentagon generals—is donning togas, reviving Roman customs, and participating in wild, Roman-style orgies at trendy nightclubs and private homes.

But a mysterious Roman general sent from the afterlife appears with a dire warning, determined to prevent history from repeating itself with a second fall of Rome...

== Cast ==
- Terry-Thomas as Goodwyn
- Edward Everett Horton as Evermore
- Pat Harrington, Jr. as Franchot
- Lisa Seagram as Cindy
- John Abbott as Gregorius
- John Myhers as Air Force General
- Tom Melody as Senator
- Myrna Ross as Miss Forever
- Monti Rock III as Tomorrow's Leader
- Murray Roman as Superdude
- Michael Christian as The Piston Kid
- Casey Kasem as disk jockey
- Bert Tenzer as Mercury's voice
- Rudi Gernreich as himself

== Critical response ==
The film was not widely reviewed, but the few reviews were negative.

Variety wrote: "Bert Tenzer's indie-made (in 1967) pic is already dated in its repetitious, papier-mache polemic. Full of razzle-dazzle editing and a concept that emerges as rather tasteless, pic looks like a home movie gone mad with pretensions of satiric social significance. The domestic R rating is both a testament to its crudity and a potential b.o hype. Terry-Thomas and Edward Everett Horton are of some value, but the heroes, if any, of this piece will be Warner Bros.-Seven Arts' drumbeaters."

Boxoffice wrote: "Bert Tenzer, writer-producer-director of Wb-Ta's 2000 Years Later, is a former maker of television commercials, and he brings to his first feature film all the quick-cut, don't-think-about-it aspects so common to TV sales pitches. Trying to make any real sense out of this cinema goulash would be a mistake, if not impossible, but audiences conditioned to the latest trends might well delight in the mad shenanigans detailed therein. ... If much of the production is amateurish and faintly reminiscent of an endless coming attraction, 2000 Years Later is still different enough to attract those looking for something far-out."

The Independent Film Journal wrote: "Unusual attempt to combine candid camera photograph techniques with satirical fantasy that doesn't come off. The end result is the feeling of having witnessed 80 minutes of psychedelic coming attractions. ...The performers seem to tackle their material with a near-desperate abandon, as if to compensate for the script's deficiencies. None has much of a chance to create a character or establish much of a genuine scene. Abbott's Roman has nothing to say and merely looks out of place, which would be all that is required of him under the circumstances. Horton is up to his old fuss-budget tricks, and Terry-Thomas does his usual 'thing'."

Howard Thompson of The New York Times opined: "This extremely overcooked satire, which was written, directed and produced by Bert Tenzer, coyly hurls itself at the viewer in a tiresome stream of jump-cut vignettes and brief film clips. ...The whole thing is apparently intended to prove what fools we modern mortals be. We'll buy that, but not Mr. Tenzer's frenzied 80-minute format. ... It doesn't work. The picture simply isn't funny. Pat Harrington, Lisa Seagram, John Myhers, Tom Melody and the others strive valiantly for laughs. It's a juiceless state of affairs indeed, when two experts like Mr. Thomas and Mr. Horton can't pump in some genuine fun."
