= Charles Z. Wick =

American film producer

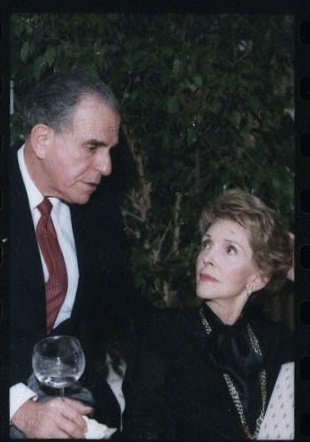
- Visiting with First Lady Nancy Reagan in 1984
- Born: Charles Zwick; October 12, 1917; Cleveland Heights, Ohio
- Died: July 20, 2008 (aged 90); Los Angeles, California
- Resting place: Forest Lawn
- Education: University of Michigan; Case Western Reserve University School of Law

Charles Z. Wick (October 12, 1917 – July 20, 2008) was director of the United States Information Agency (USIA) under President Ronald Reagan (1981–1989). As USIA director, Wick launched the first live global satellite television network.

Wick was born Charles Zwick; he decided working in show business warranted an 'easier name'. Wick also established the Voice of America's Radio Marti broadcasting to Cuba; created RIAS TV in Berlin; headed the International Youth Exchange Initiative; established an office within USIA to implement the General Exchanges Agreement between the U.S. and the former Soviet Union; and created the Artistic Ambassador Program with its international young artists' exchanges.

Wick was an independent businessman involved in the financing and operation of motion picture, television, radio, music, health care, and mortgage industries in the United States and abroad. He was president and chief executive officer of Wick Financial Corp., and Mapleton Enterprises, which he founded in the early 1960s. He was co-chairman of the 1981 Presidential Inaugural Committee.

Wick graduated from the University of Michigan (B.M.) and Case Western Reserve University School of Law (J.D.). He was a member of the California and Ohio Bar Associations.

Wick was on the Advisory Board of USC Center on Public Diplomacy.

Prior to his entering into governmental affairs, he produced such films as Snow White and the Three Stooges (1961).

He died of natural causes at his Los Angeles home at age 90, according to his son, movie producer Douglas Wick, and a report issued by the Ronald Reagan Presidential Foundation.
