= Billy Sands =

American character actor (1911–84)

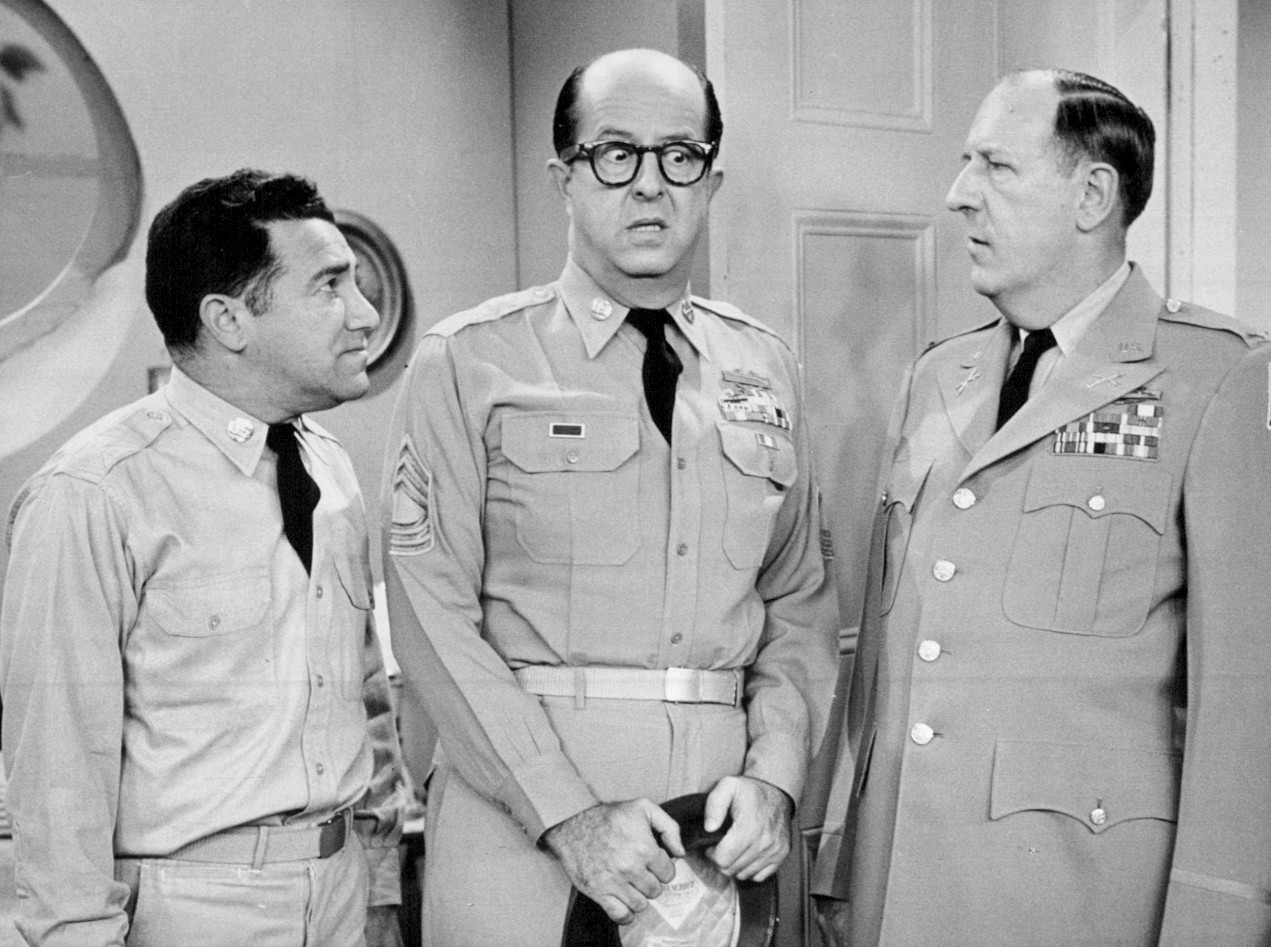
- Sands at left with Phil Silvers and Paul Ford in The Phil Silvers Show, 1958
- Born: January 6, 1911; Bergen, New York, US
- Died: August 24, 1984 (aged 73); Los Angeles, California, US
- Resting place: Hillside Memorial Park Cemetery, Culver City, California
- Occupation: Television actor
- Spouse: Marsha
- Children: 2

Billy Sands (January 6, 1911 – August 24, 1984) was an American character actor who appeared as a regular on The Phil Silvers Show (Sgt Bilko) as Pvt. Dino Papparelli and was a regular on McHale's Navy as Harrison "Tinker" Bell (named after Tinker Bell). He also made guest-starring roles on many other television series, including Car 54, Where Are You?, All in the Family, Here's Lucy, Happy Days, and The Odd Couple. Sands also appears in one of the opening scenes of Rocky as a booker for the fighters and season 1 episode 22 of Alice.

== Personal life and death ==
Born William F. Sands in Bergen, New York to Samuel & Henrietta Epstein, he began his professional career in 1946 when he appeared on Broadway with Spencer Tracy in Robert E. Sherwood's Rugged Path.

Sands died of lung cancer at age 73 at UCLA Medical Center in Los Angeles, on August 24, 1984, and was buried at Hillside Memorial Park Cemetery in Culver City, California. He was survived by his wife Marsha, daughter Susan, son Eugene, two sisters and a brother.

== Partial filmography ==
- McHale's Navy (1964) - Motor Machinist Mate Harrison Bell
- McHale's Navy Joins the Air Force (1965) - Motor Machinist Mate Harrison Bell
- The Reluctant Astronaut (1967) - Airport Announcer / Man Mopping Floor in Film (uncredited)
- P.J. (1968) - Barber (uncredited)
- The Love God? (1969) - Barber (uncredited)
- How to Frame a Figg (1971) - Bowling Alley Manager
- Another Nice Mess (1972) - Interpreter
- The Harrad Experiment (1973) - Jack
- Rocky (1976) - Club Fight Announcer
- The World's Greatest Lover (1977) - Guard
- High Anxiety (1977) - Customer
- Serial (1980) - Bartender
