= Edward Montagne =

American film director

- Born: Edward J. Montagne Jr. May 20, 1912; Brooklyn, New York, U.S.
- Died: December 15, 2003 (aged 91); Agoura Hills, California, U.S.
- Occupations: Television producer, film producer, film director

Edward J. Montagne Jr. (May 20, 1912 – December 15, 2003) was an American television series producer and film director. He was the son of screenwriter Edward J. Montagne,

== Career ==
He produced the successful American television series The Phil Silvers Show, The Tall Man and McHale's Navy. He also directed the films McHale's Navy (1964) starring Ernest Borgnine and its sequel McHale's Navy Joins the Air Force (1965) starring Joe Flynn and Tim Conway.

He produced several films as Universal Pictures for Don Knotts as well as Angel in My Pocket with Andy Griffith as well as They Went That-A-Way & That-A-Way (1978) starring Tim Conway and Chuck McCann. In 1978, Montagne was nominated for an Primetime Emmy for Outstanding Drama Series.
