= Carl Ballantine =

American magician, comedian and actor (1917–2009)

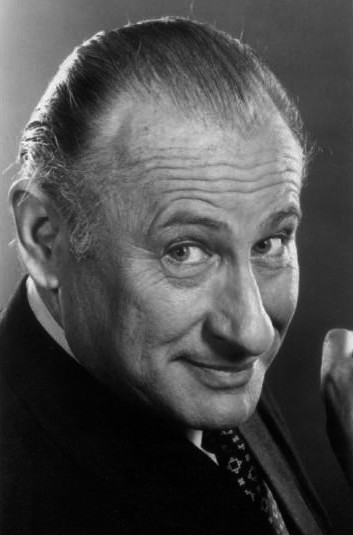
- Ballantine in 1968
- Born: Meyer Kessler; September 27, 1917; Chicago, Illinois, U.S.
- Died: November 3, 2009 (aged 92); Hollywood Hills, California, U.S.
- Occupations: Magician; comedian; actor
- Years active: 1936–2009
- Spouse: Ceil Cabot (m. 1955; died 2000)
- Children: 2

Carl Ballantine (born Meyer Kessler; September 27, 1917 – November 3, 2009) was an American magician, comedian and actor. Billing himself as "The Great Ballantine", "The Amazing Ballantine" or "Ballantine: The World's Greatest Magician", his vaudeville-style comedy routine involved transparent or incompetent stage magic tricks, which tended to flop and go "hilariously awry" to the wisecracking Ballantine's mock chagrin. He has been credited with creating comedy magic and has influenced comedians and magicians alike.

== Early life and career ==
Ballantine was born Meyer Kessler in Chicago, Illinois, the son of Israel Kessler (1883–1930) and Rose Cohen (1890–1973), both Jewish immigrants from Borshchiv, Ukraine, and Russian Poland (then part of the Austrian Empire and Second Polish Republic). Nicknamed the "Jipper", he was inspired at age 9 by his barber who would do magic tricks with thimbles while cutting his hair. His first job was working as a printer.

In the 1930s, Kessler was doing professional straight magic as "Count Marakoff", "Carlton Sharpe", and "Carl Sharp" in Chicago, helping support his family, and later moved to New York City, where he performed in nightclubs and on television variety shows. In the early 1940s, he gave up "real magic" when he realized he could not be as good as some of his peers. According to his daughter, "one night, one of his tricks got screwed up, he said something to cover, and the audience laughed. So he started adding more."

He switched to comedy magic and changed his name to "Carl Ballantine", after he noticed a bottle of Ballantine whisky in an advertisement and decided it sounded "show-businessy and classy", and called the magic act "Ballantine, the World's Greatest Magician". He entertained troops during World War II. He was billed as "The Amazing Mr. Ballantine" when he played the New York Capitol in 1950, and "The Great Ballantine" in The Ed Sullivan Show and The Steve Allen Show on television in the 1950s and 1960s.

He was the first magician to play Las Vegas, appearing on a bill with Harry James, Betty Grable, and Sammy Davis Jr. at El Rancho Vegas in 1956.

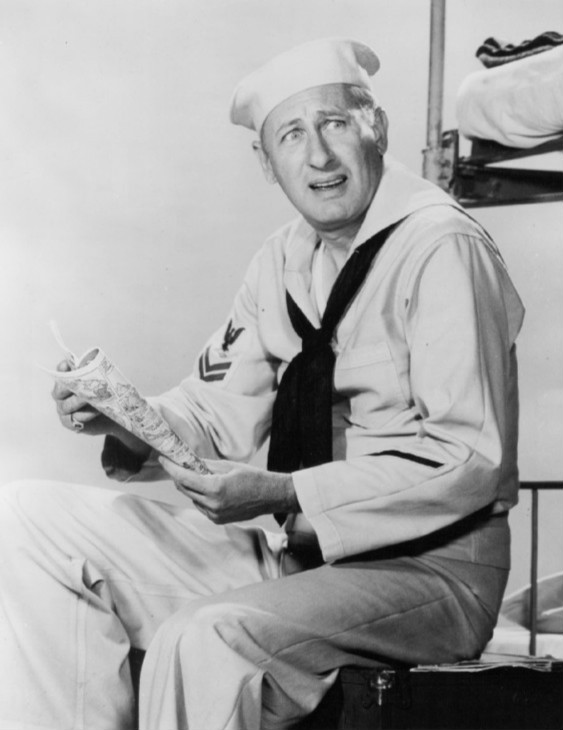
Ballantine as Lester Gruber in McHale's Navy

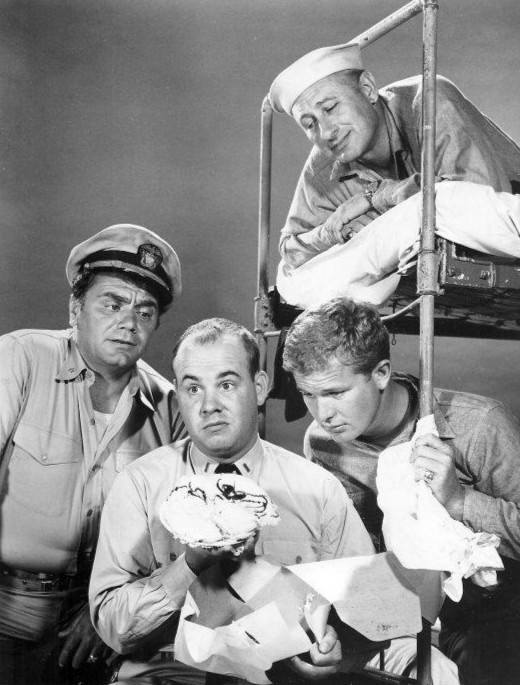
Ernest Borgnine, Tim Conway, Gary Vinson, and Ballantine (in top bunk) in McHale's Navy in 1962

Ballantine was cast in several films, including McHale's Navy (1964), Penelope (1966), Speedway (1968), The Shakiest Gun in the West (1968), The World's Greatest Lover (1977), Just You and Me, Kid (1979), Disney's The North Avenue Irregulars (1979) and Billy Crystal’s directorial debut, Mr. Saturday Night (1992), and in numerous television series, including the ABC sitcom McHale's Navy (1962–1966), in which he played Lester Gruber, one of the PT boat sailors known for his hucksterism and wild schemes. He was a supporting player on the show, working with stars Ernest Borgnine, Joe Flynn, and Tim Conway.

An early television role cast him as magician Al Henderson, working the 53rd precinct Christmas party for brother-in-law Officer Toody in episode 15 of the first season of Car 54, Where Are You?, originally airing December 24, 1961. He also guest-starred on The Partridge Family, I Dream of Jeannie as a used car salesman, and on The Monkees episode "The Audition" which aired on January 23, 1967. In 1971, he appeared as Matty Ryan on "The Men From Shiloh" (rebranded name for the TV western The Virginian) in the episode titled "The Politician." He appeared on CHiPs as magician "The Great Marvello", in the episode "Rustling", which aired January 28, 1978. In 1973, he appeared as Dr. Hankim in The Girl Most Likely to.... His last feature film appearance was in Aimee Semple McPherson, a 2006 biopic about the female evangelist.

Ballantine made his only appearance on Broadway as Lycus the slave merchant in the 1972 revival of A Funny Thing Happened on the Way to the Forum starring Phil Silvers. He was also a frequent panelist/judge on The Gong Show, even appearing on the series finale of the NBC daytime version.

In later years, he was a recurring voice artist on Garfield and Friends, primarily as Al J. Swindler, a purveyor of shoddy merchandise.

== Personal life ==
Ballantine's first marriage ended in divorce. In 1955, he married actress Ceil Cabot (born Celia Cabrera; March 8, 1927 – January 24, 2000), to whom he remained married until her death. Their two daughters, Saratoga, an actress, and Molly, an advertising sales executive, are both named after racetracks.

== Death ==
Ballantine died on November 3, 2009, at age 92 at his home in Hollywood, California. His remains were cremated.

== Awards and honors ==
He won the Academy of Magical Arts' (AMA) Special Fellowship in 1973, Performing Fellowship in 1984, and the "Louie" Award from Tannen's Magic in 1985. In 2007, he received the 2006 Lifetime Achievement Fellowship from the Academy of Magical Arts. The award was presented by Steve Martin, who calls Ballantine "the king of bungling magicians" in his memoir Born Standing Up, and said in an interview: "Carl Ballantine influenced not only myself but a generation of magicians and comedians. His was also the most copied act by a host of amateurs and professionals." According to David Copperfield, "Carl Ballantine created comedy magic. The combination of magic and comedy had perhaps been done before, but he truly defined it and made it his own."

== Filmography ==
Year	Title	Role	Notes
1964	McHale's Navy	Torpedoman Lester Gruber	
1966	Penelope	Boom Boom	
1967	The Monkees	Hubble Bensen	Episode: "Find the Monkees"
1968	Speedway	Birdie Kebner	
1968	The Shakiest Gun in the West	Swanson	
1968	I Dream of Jeannie	Carl Tucker	
1976	Revenge of the Cheerleaders	Dr. Ivory	
1977	The World's Greatest Lover	Uncle Harry	
1978	CHiPs - S1E14 - Rustling	Marvello The Great	
1979	The North Avenue Irregulars	Sam	
1979	Just You and Me, Kid	Reinhoff the Remarkable	
1980	One in a Million	Max Kellerman	
1986	Night Court	Philip Falcone	
1986	The Best of Times	Arturo	
1992	Mr. Saturday Night	Freddie	
1995	Freakazoid!	Huska	Voice, episode: "Lawn Gnomes: Chapter IV – Fun in the Sun"
1996	I Crave Rock & Roll	Dewey Rose	
1996	Spider-Man	Lenny Luntz	Voice, episode: "Goblin War!"
1998	My Giant	Rabbi	
1998	Susan's Plan	Harold Beyers	
2000	The Million Dollar Kid	Lieutenant	
2002	Farewell to Harry	Hickey	
2006	Aimee Semple McPherson	Realtor in China	
