= Lisa Seagram =

American actress (1936–2019)

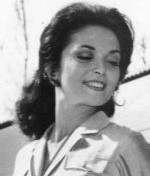
- Seagram in 1964
- Born: Ruth Browser; July 7, 1936; Brooklyn, New York, U.S.
- Died: February 1, 2019 (aged 82); Burbank, California, U.S.
- Occupation: Actress
- Years active: 1958–1976
- Spouse: Marc Fiorini
- Children: 2

Lisa Seagram (born Ruth Browser; July 7, 1936 – February 1, 2019) was an American actress. She was best known for her roles in The Carpetbaggers (1964), Caprice (1967) and 2000 Years Later (1969). After appearing in several Italian films, she retired from acting during the mid 1970s.

== Life ==
Born in Brooklyn, New York, Seagram was the daughter of Harry Browser, a New York City police detective. She worked as a graphic artist after graduating from college. Acting on a friend's suggestion, she began working as a model.

After someone suggested that she "looked like an actor", she studied drama for three years, which led to a small role in Shadows (1959). During the 1960s, she played numerous supporting roles, including appearances on television shows such as McHale's Navy, The Beverly Hillbillies, Perry Mason and Batman. She appeared in season 1, episode 11, of Bewitched as Sarah, a fellow witch Endora gets to test the fidelity of Darrin. She played the lead female role in the comedy film 2000 Years Later.

She relocated for a time to Italy where she appeared in several local productions, most notably playing the lead role in the thriller film Yellow - Le Cugine (1969). The majority of the films she made in Italy were geared to Italian audiences and were never released in the United States. It was while working in Italy that she met her husband, expatriate Canadian actor Marc Fiorini.

After retiring from acting, Seagram first sold commercial real estate. In the 1980s, she created Actors 2000, teaching acting in Hawaii. She later moved the school to Los Angeles.

Seagram died of dementia in Burbank, California on February 1, 2019, at the age of 82.

== Filmography ==
Year	Title	Role	Notes
1958	Shadows	Woman	Uncredited
1961	Love in a Goldfish Bowl		Uncredited
1961	Man-Trap	Yolande Thaw	Uncredited
1961	Bachelor in Paradise	Niles' Secretary	Uncredited
1963	Come Blow Your Horn	Party Guest	Uncredited
1963	My Three Sons	Maria	Season 3 Episode 30 "The Rug"
1963	Wagon Train	Esther	Season 6 Episode 32 "The Clarence Mullins Story"
1963	McHale's Navy	Rita Howard	Season 2 Episode 4 "Is There a Doctor in the Hut?"
1963	Gunsmoke	Saloon Girl	Season 9 Episode 6 "My Sister's Keeper"
1963	Gunsmoke	Girl	Season 9 Episode 10 "Extradition: Part 1"
1964	Bewitched	Janine	Season 1 Episode 11 "It Takes One to Know One"
1964	The Carpetbaggers	Moroni's Secretary	
1964	A House Is Not a Home	Madge	
1964	Where Love Has Gone	Edna - Bar Girl	Uncredited
1964	Burke's Law	Diana	Season 1 Episode 27 "Who Killed WHO IV?"
1964	Burke's Law	Mila	Season 1 Episode 30 "Who Killed the Eleventh Best Dressed Woman in the World?"
1964	Burke's Law	Ventura Jones	Season 2 Episode 12 "Who Killed 711?"
1964	Burke's Law	Pandora Shriner	Season 2 Episode 15 "Who Killed Davidian Jonas?"
1965	Burke's Law	Mathilde	Season 2 Episode 19 "Who Killed Rosie Sunset?"
1965	Burke's Law	Princess	Season 3 Episode 10 "Deadlier Than the Male"
1965	The Beverly Hillbillies	Edythe Brewster	Season 3 Episode 24 "Brewster's Honeymoon"
1965	The Beverly Hillbillies	Edythe Brewster	Season 3 Episode 32 "The Brewsters Return"
1965	My Favorite Martian	Felicia Fratoli	Season 2 Episode 38 "Portrait in Brown"
1966	The Double Life of Henry Phyfe	Beautiful Girl - Equestrienne	Season 1 Episode 1 "Phyfe and a Filly"
1966	The Beverly Hillbillies	Edythe Brewster	Season 4 Episode 22 "Brewster's Baby"
1966	Perry Mason	Robin Spring	Season 9 Episode 21 "The Case of the Twice-Told Twist"
1966	My Brother the Angel	Marcella	Season 1 Episode 26 "Her Number Is 36-22-35"
1966	Honey West	Connie Phillips	Season 1 Episode 30 "An Eerie, Airy, Thing"
1966	The Girl from U.N.C.L.E.	Miss. Karum	Season 1 Episode 8 "The Garden of Evil Affair"
1967	Caprice	Mandy	
1967	Batman	Lila	Season 3 Episode 7 "Louie, the Lilac"
1969	2000 Years Later	Cindy	
1969	Yellow: The Cousins	Marta Garbini	
1969	The Reward's Yours... The Man's Mine	Bar owner	
1973	Canterbury n° 2 - Nuove storie d'amore del '300	Greek warrior	Uncredited
1974	The Cousin	Murderess	Uncredited
1976	La studentessa		(final film role)

== Television ==
Seagram guest starred on American television sitcom McHale's Navy as the fictional movie star, singer, and dancer Rita Howard entertaining troops in the Pacific theater of WWII. She also guest starred on the sit-coms The Beverly Hillbillies, Bewitched Season 1 episode 11 "It Takes One to Know One" playing Sarah Baker, a rival witch trying to lure Darrin from Samantha as the gorgeous "Jasmine Girl," a seductive model for a perfume advertising campaign; as Robin Springer in Perry Mason season 9, episode 21, "The Case Of The Twice Told Twist", notable as being the only episode of the series filmed in color; Burke's Law S01E27 "Who Killed Who IV" and several other TV series in the 1960s such as Batman.
