= Bobby Wright =

American country music singer (1942–2026)

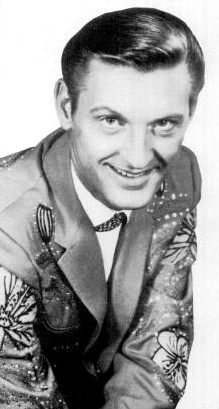
- Wright in 1970

Background information
- Also known as: John Wright
- Born: John Robert Wright Jr. March 30, 1942; Charleston, West Virginia, U.S.
- Died: October 27, 2026 (aged 84) Madison, Tennessee, U.S.
- Genre: Country
- Occupation: Singer
- Instrument: Vocals
- Years active: 1967–1979
- Label: Decca; ABC; United Artists

John Robert Wright Jr. (March 30, 1942 – October 27, 2026) was an American country music singer, who was the middle child and only son of country singers Johnnie Wright and Kitty Wells.

== Life and career ==
John Robert Wright was born in Charleston, West Virginia, on March 30, 1942. Most of his boyhood years were spent in Louisiana, since his parents were regular performers on the country music television program Louisiana Hayride. At age eight, Wright appeared with his parents on the show, and became part of their recordings three years later. The family went back to Nashville in 1958, because his parents became headliners at the Grand Ole Opry.

Although Wright was an able guitarist and vocalist, he had little interest in a music career. He became interested in acting when he learned that Peter Tewksbury, a television and film director, had a role for a young Southern boy who could play the guitar. Wright made the trip to Hollywood to test for Tewksbury. While he did not get the role he went to California for, his screen test was seen by the producer of McHale's Navy, who cast him in the new television comedy as Willy Moss, the PT-73 radio operator, a role he played through the entire series.

While McHale's Navy was still in production, Wright decided to give music a try, beginning by working with his mother on one of her 1965 albums. Unhappy with the Hollywood scene after McHale's Navy ended, he moved back to Nashville to start a music career.

Wright recorded for Decca, ABC and United Artists Records between 1967 and 1979, charting 21 singles on the Hot Country Songs charts. "Here I Go Again", which reached number 13 in 1971, was his highest-charting release.

He appeared with his parents and sisters, Ruby and Carol Sue, on the Kitty Wells Family Show a syndicated television show in the early 1960s. He also toured with his parents from the 1960s until Johnnie and Kitty retired from the road in 2007. Wright performed with his parents at the International Festival of Country Music at Wembley in 1974, and returned to the United Kingdom with them for the Peterborough Country Music Festival in 1988. He was married to the former Brenda Kay Davis; the couple has two daughters, Theresa LeAnn and Kamela Lynn.

As of 2026, Wright was the last surviving cast member from the McHale's Navy television series.

He died at his home in Madison, Tennessee, on October 27, 2026, at the age of 84.

He is buried at Spring Hill Cemetery in Nashville, Tennesee.

== Discography ==
=== Albums ===
Title	Album details
Here I Go Again	Release date: 1971; Label: Decca Records; Format: LP record
Seasons of Love	Release date: 1974; Label: ABC Records; Format: LP record

=== Singles ===
Year	Single	Peak chart positions			Album
Year	Single	US Country	AUS	CAN Country	Album
1967	"Lay Some Happiness on Me"	44	—	—	Non-album singles
1967	"That See Me Later Look"	67	—	—	Non-album singles
1968	"Old Before My Time"	70	—	—	Non-album singles
1969	"Upstairs in the Bedroom"	40	—	—	Non-album singles
1969	"Sing a Song About Love"	70	—	—	Non-album singles
1970	"Take Me Back to the Goodtimes, Sally"	61	—	—	Here I Go Again
1970	"Hurry Home to Me"	47	—	—	Here I Go Again
1971	"If You Want Me To, I'll Go"	74	—	—	Here I Go Again
1971	"Here I Go Again"	13	—	21	Here I Go Again
1971	"Search Your Heart"	54	—	—	Here I Go Again
1972	"Just Because I'm Still in Love with You"	60	—	—	Non-album singles
1973	"If Not for You"	75	—	—	Non-album singles
1973	"Lovin' Someone on My Mind"	39	—	—	Seasons of Love
1974	"Seasons in the Sun"	24	51	73	Seasons of Love
1974	"Everybody Needs a Rainbow"	56	—	—	Seasons of Love
1974	"Baby's Gone"	55	—	—	Seasons of Love
1975	"I Just Came Home to Count the Memories"	75	—	—	Non-album singles
1977	"Neon Lady"	79	—	—	Non-album singles
1977	"Playing with the Baby's Mama"	97	—	—	Non-album singles
1978	"Takin' a Chance"	100	—	—	Non-album singles
1979	"I'm Turning You Loose"	77	—	—	Non-album singles
"—" denotes releases that did not chart
