= Torpedoman's mate =

Torpedoman's mate - merged into Gunner's Mate rating.
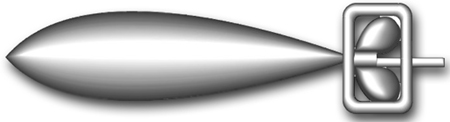
- Rating insignia
- Issued by: United States Navy
- Type: Enlisted rating
- Abbreviation: TM
- Specialty: Weapons

Torpedoman's Mate (abbreviated as TM) is a United States Navy occupational rating. It was disestablished on submarines in 1995 and on surface ships on 1 October 2007. Surface torpedomen were merged into the gunner's mate rating, while submarine torpedomen were merged into the machinist's mate (non-nuclear) rating, becoming MM(W) or machinist mates (weapons). It was re-established on 30 September 2019 via NAVADMIN 225/19. The TM rating badge will be the same one in use when the rating was disestablished in 1995.

The re-establishment of the rate is in direct support of the Sailor 2025 and Rating Modernization initiative, which aim to empower Sailors and expand professional development opportunities.

A torpedoman's mate:

- Torpedomen perform organizational and intermediate level maintenance on underwater ordnance
- Handle torpedoes and antisubmarine rockets (ASROC) launched from surface ships, submarines, and aircraft, as well as missiles (Tomahawk/Harpoon), decoys, and countermeasures launched from submarines
- Originally loaded Polaris and Poseidon missiles aboard Fleet Ballistic Missile submarines; in port and underway, maintained and operated the missile launch tubes and their associated pneumatic/hydraulic/electrical systems. These functions have been taken over by Missile Technicians for the Trident missile.
- Operate and maintain test equipment, launching/firing systems, and stowage facilities associated with underwater ordnance
- Prepare underwater ordnance for launching, conduct postfire/post-run routines, and weapons performance evaluation procedures
- Maintain and operate the anchor on board submarines
- Maintain, issue, and conduct training for small arms and act as subject matter experts in force protection on board submarines

== See also ==
- List of United States Navy ratings
