= Edson Stroll =

American actor (1929–2011)

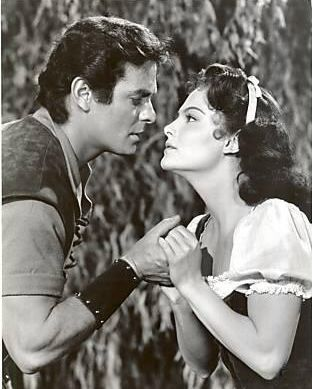
- Snow White (Carol Heiss) and Prince Charming (Edson Stroll) in Snow White and the Three Stooges, 1961
- Born: Edward Roy Stroll; January 6, 1929; Chicago, Illinois, US
- Died: July 18, 2011 (aged 82); Marina del Rey, California, US
- Occupation: Actor
- Years active: 1958–2011

Edson Stroll (January 6, 1929 – July 18, 2011) was an American actor who appeared in over 20 film and television programs beginning in 1958.

== Career ==
Born in Chicago to Charles Stroll and Estelle Rose Stroll in a Jewish family, Stroll enlisted in the United States Navy in the late 1940s then began his career as a bodybuilder in the 1950s.

He studied acting and singing at the American Theater Wing in New York City and received a Fulbright Scholarship for voice performance, followed by an artist's contract for performance and advance study by the National Broadcasting Company.

He did a variety of stage work and from 1958 onwards he had bit parts on television shows such as How to Marry a Millionaire and Sea Hunt. He appeared in two episodes of The Twilight Zone, "Eye of the Beholder" (1960) and "The Trade-Ins" (1962). He played Dynamite in the Elvis Presley film G.I. Blues (1960). He then landed a steady role on McHale's Navy as Virgil Edwards.

Fans of the slapstick comedy team The Three Stooges remember Stroll for his roles in two 1960s-era feature films: Snow White and the Three Stooges and The Three Stooges in Orbit.

In the 1960s, Stroll co-owned a men's high fashion seconds shop in Beverly Hills.

Throughout the 2000s, Stroll provided voice-overs, and he occasionally appeared at Hollywood autograph signing shows, near his home in Marina del Rey, California.

Stroll was a licensed ship's captain and marine surveyor.

== Death ==
Stroll died of cancer on July 18, 2011, at the age of 82.
