= Joan Staley =

American model and actress (1940–2019)

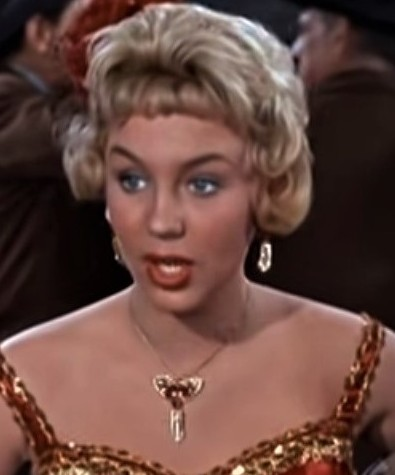
- Staley in Bonanza (1960)
- Born: Joan Lynette McConchie; May 20, 1940; Minneapolis, Minnesota, U.S.
- Died: November 24, 2019 (aged 79); Valencia, California, U.S.
- Education: Chapman College
- Occupation: Actress
- Years active: 1948–1982
- Known for: Broadside; 77 Sunset Strip; Perry Mason
- Spouses: Chuck Staley (m. 1956; div. 1960) Dale Sheets (m. 1967)
- Children: 7

Joan Staley (born Joan Lynette McConchie; May 20, 1940 – November 24, 2019) was an American actress and model.

== Early life ==
Staley was born in Minneapolis, Minnesota, the daughter of James and Jean McConchie. Her father was a minister, and her mother was a musician who played violin, piano, organ, and viola. She grew up in Los Angeles, California.

At age three, Staley's mother took her to a concert, after which Joan requested a violin. When her mother realized she was serious, she obliged. Her first instructor was Karl Moldrem, the founder of the Baby Orchestra in Los Angeles. By age six, Staley had won by audition first chair/second violin in Peter Meremblum's Junior Symphony (André Previn was an alumnus). This led to her first film appearance, as a child violinist, in The Emperor Waltz, starring Bing Crosby and Joan Fontaine.

Her mother and father were missionaries in Africa, after which her father joined the Army as a chaplain. As the family moved to various postings, Staley attended schools in Chicago, Washington, D.C., Munich, and Paris. She briefly attended Chapman College, after which she moved to where her father was stationed in San Francisco to find work, as the only teletype operator at the William R. Stats brokerage firm.

== Career ==
She joined The Little Theater in Hollywood with roles in The Robe, Fiona in Brigadoon, and My Sister Eileen with actress Jo Anne Worley. This led to small roles in live television, such as Playhouse 90, Climax!, and Westinghouse Studio One. These appearances opened the door for her in film and television. Staley's first role in television was a 1958 Perry Mason episode, "The Case of the Corresponding Corpse". In early 1958, Lawrence Schiller, a Life photographer, approached Staley and asked her to pose for Playboy. They did a photo shoot together, which resulted in the actual spread used by the magazine. Publisher Hugh Hefner selected her to be Playboy's "Miss November" 1958.

Her first marriage was to television director Chuck Staley (1956–1960). They had a daughter, Sherrye Dee Staley (born 1959). During this time, Metro-Goldwyn-Mayer signed Staley to contract, one of the last actresses to do so. Her working experience, seen taking a shower in the opening credits, with director Vincente Minnelli for Bells Are Ringing, starring Judy Holliday, was, for her, a memorable start to her film career. She enjoyed a film and television career that lasted through the 1960s and into the early 1970s. Her first guest-starring role was on The Untouchables.

For her first ongoing series role, she was featured in multiple appearances on the popular sitcom The Tab Hunter Show, where she was widely recognized for her comedic abilities. In 1961, she appeared in two roles in The Lawless Years, a 1920s crime drama starring James Gregory. After The Lawless Years, she had a one-time recurring role as David Nelson's temporary secretary in The Adventures of Ozzie and Harriet. She went on to guest-star on Phil Silvers's sitcom The New Phil Silvers Show. A year later, she co-starred with singer Vic Damone in The Lively Ones for NBC, the summer replacement series for The Tennessee Ernie Ford Show. She also co-starred in Valley of the Dragons in 1961 as "Deena".

Staley made two additional guest appearances on Perry Mason, as Sally in "The Case Of The Double Entry Mind", and including the role of murderer Gina Gilbert in the 1962 episode, "The Case of the Lonely Eloper". She was also featured on episodes of Stoney Burke, Wagon Train, The Real McCoys, McHale's Navy, The Virginian, The Dick Van Dyke Show, The Untouchables, Burke's Law, The Munsters, Batman, Maverick, Hawaiian Eye, Surfside 6, Tales of Wells Fargo, and Rango, among others.

She was a regular as Hannah, the secretary to series character Stuart Bailey (Efrem Zimbalist Jr.), on the sixth and final season of the ABC/Warner Bros. crime drama, 77 Sunset Strip. One of her favorite roles was a small part in A New Kind of Love (1963), starring Paul Newman and Joanne Woodward, in which Staley had a sequence with Newman. She also appeared in Cape Fear (1962) as a waitress in a scene with Robert Mitchum; Johnny Cool (1963); and the 1964 Elvis Presley movie, Roustabout; and co-starred in The Ghost and Mr. Chicken (1966) opposite Don Knotts and in Gunpoint (1966) opposite Audie Murphy.

In 1964, she appeared on McHale's Navy and was signed to a Universal Studios contract for the McHale's Navy spin-off Broadside, where she co-starred with Kathleen Nolan, Sheila James, and Dick Sargent. Her character was Roberta "Honey-Hips" Love, a former stripper who had joined the Navy. In 1966, she suffered a serious back injury as a result of a horseback riding accident during the filming of Gunpoint starring Audie Murphy. She stopped working in films after that and concentrated on television.

== Personal life ==
She married Charles Staley in 1956, whom she had met in France. They moved to Memphis, Tennessee, where he was working as a television director. Staley worked as a legal secretary for Homer L. Armstrong, a local attorney in Memphis. Also during this period, Staley sang occasional backup for Sun Records, of Elvis Presley fame. The Staley family then moved to Los Angeles.

She married again, in 1967, to Dale Sheets, an executive with MCA. In 1969, she and her husband founded International Ventures Incorporated and continued to manage talent. Collectively, the Sheets had seven children: he had three by a previous marriage, she had one, and they had three together. As of 2013, they had ten grandchildren and 20 great-grandchildren. Staley was active in consumer affairs, her church, and prison ministry. She died on November 24th, 2019 at age 79.

== Awards and honors ==
Staley was one of 12 actresses selected by the Hollywood Make-Up Artists and Hair Stylists Union as Deb Stars of 1962.

== In popular culture ==
A highly fictionalized version of her appears in James Ellroy's 2026 novel Red Sheet.

| Elizabeth Ann Roberts | Cheryl Kubert | Zahra Norbo | Felicia Atkins | Lari Laine | Judy Lee Tomerlin |
| Linné Ahlstrand | Myrna Weber | Teri Hope | Mara Corday, Pat Sheehan | Joan Staley | Joyce Nizzari |
