= Hey, Jeannie! =

American sitcom (1956-1958)

- Season 1 title card
- Also known as: The Jeannie Carson Show
- Genre: Sitcom
- Created by: Charles Isaacs
- Starring: Jeannie Carson; Allen Jenkins; Jane Dulo; Jack Kirkwood; Vera Vague
- Country of origin: United States
- Original language: English
- No. of seasons: 2
- No. of episodes: 32

Production
- Executive producer: Charles Isaacs
- Producers: Charles Isaacs; William Harmon
- Running time: 30 mins. (approx)
- Production company: Four Star-Tartan/Jeannie Productions

Original release
- Network: CBS (1956–1957); First-run syndication (1958)
- Release: September 8, 1956 – March 16, 1957 (on CBS); 1958 (first-run syndication)

Season 2 title card after premise and title change.

Hey, Jeannie!, retitled The Jeannie Carson Show during its second season and also during later prime-time reruns, is an American sitcom that aired on CBS during the 1956–57 television season and in first-run syndication during 1958. The series stars Jeannie Carson as a naïve young Scottish woman who emigrates to New York City.

== Synopsis ==
Jeannie MacLennan is a young Scottish woman who emigrates from the United Kingdom to New York City. Sweet and naïve, she arrives with no job and no place to stay. Taxicab driver Al Murray comes to her assistance and is named as her sponsor. Jeannie moves in with Al and his sister, Liz, in Brooklyn. During Season 1, Jeannie moves from job to job — salesgirl in a doughnut shop, golf caddie, Chinese restaurant manager, executive secretary, taxicab dispatcher, policewoman — and encounters unusual people and situations as she learns about what to her are strange American customs.

In season 2, with the show retitled The Jeannie Carson Show, Jeannie has settled into a career as an airline stewardess and has moved into a new apartment. Her boss at the airline is the chief stewardess, Mabel, and Herbert is a flight engineer who often is part of the crew on Jeannie's flights. Her new landlord is Charlie O'Connell.

== Cast ==
- Jeannie Carson as Jeannie MacLennan
- Allen Jenkins as Al Murray (season 1)
- Jane Dulo as Liz Murray (season 1)
- Jack Kirkwood as Charlie O'Connell (season 2)
- Vera Vague as Mabel (season 2)
- William Schallert as Herbert (season 2)

== Production ==
Jeannie Carson was performing in her breakout role in the musical Love from Judy at the Saville Theatre in London in 1952–1953 when producer Max Liebman saw her in that production. He signed her to a contract to appear on television in the United States. Hey, Jeannie! gave Carson her first starring role on American television.

Four Star-Tartan and Jeannie Productions produced Hey, Jeannie! and The Jeannie Carson Show. Carson sang a song in most episodes.

Procter & Gamble initially was the program's only sponsor. In January 1957 Chesterfield cigarettes became an alternate week sponsor.

== Broadcast history ==
Hey, Jeannie! premiered on CBS on September 8, 1956. CBS cancelled it after a single season, and the last of its 26 original episodes on CBS aired on March 16, 1957. CBS then broadcast reruns of Hey, Jeannie! for another seven weeks, from March 23 to May 4, 1957. The show aired from 9:30 to 10:00 p.m. Eastern Time on Saturdays throughout its CBS run.

After CBS cancelled Hey Jeannie!, the show underwent a change in premise and was retitled The Jeannie Carson Show for its second season. Only six episodes were produced for the second season, and they ran in first-run syndication in the United States during 1958.

ABC broadcast reruns of Hey, Jeannie! under the title The Jeannie Carson Show from June 30 to September 22, 1960, as a summer replacement for The Pat Boone Chevy Showroom. The reruns ran on Thursdays at 9:00 p.m. Eastern Time.

== Episodes ==
=== Season 1: Hey, Jeannie! (1956–1957) ===
No. overall	No. in season	Title	Directed by	Written by	Original release date
1	1	"Jeannie, the Cab Driver"	Leslie Goodwins	Stanley Shapiro and Fred Fox	September 8, 1956
Al plays hooky from driving his taxi so that he can go to a baseball game. When his boss starts looking for him, Jeannie tries to keep Al out of trouble by hiding his cab. During the episode, Jeannie and Al sing "Take Me Out to the Ball Game" and Jeannie sings "Phil the Fluther's Ball." Guest stars: John Eldredge, Frank Jenks, William Haade, Frank Sully, Ralph Manza, and Ken Christy.
2	2	"The Witness"	James Kern	Nate Monaster	September 15, 1956
After Jeannie witnesses a car accident, the attorneys for both drivers contact her and ask her to say that the accident was the other driver's fault — and when the case goes to court, the complete honesty of her testimony backfires on both drivers. During the episode, Jeannie sings "A Wee Doc and Doris." Guest stars: Don Beddoe, Addison Richards, Harry Antrim, and Lester Dorr.
3	3	"The Paul Revere Show"	Les Goodwins	Charles Isaacs and Jack Elinson	September 22, 1956
Jeannie talks Al into driving her to Boston so she can take part in the annual ceremonies there commemorating Paul Revere′s ride. During the episode, Jeannie sings "Baa, Baa, Black Sheep." Guest stars: William Tannen, Rodney Bell, Tom Fadden, and Tom Kennedy.
4	4	"The Stockbroker"	Unknown	Unknown	September 29, 1956
After an eavesdropper misunderstands a conversation between Jeannie and her stockbroker and Jeannie buys one share of stock in a steel corporation, rumors spread that she is fronting for a syndicate which plans to take over the whole corporation — and the rumors eventually reach the head of the steel company.
5	5	"Jeannie's Here"	John Rich	Charles Isaacs	October 13, 1956
The pilot for the series. Jeannie reminisces about her first meeting with Al and the good fortune she has had since arriving in New York City. She recalls how upon arriving in the United States, she was so overjoyed that she had stopped traffic on the George Washington Bridge, how the nonplussed Al had come to her assistance — and how he then was named her sponsor. During the episode, Jeannie sings "I Feel a Song Coming On." Guest stars: Jack Albertson, Hugh Sanders, Joe Devlin, Peter Leeds, Dave Appolon, and Dick Wessel.
6	6	"Jeannie Goes to Washington"	Les Goodwins	Jack Elinson and Charles Stewart	October 20, 1956
As a reward for selling more doughnuts than any other salesgirl in the doughnut shop where she works, Jeannie wins a trip to Washington, D.C. — and after arriving in Washington, she befuddles a guide with her profound knowledge of American history. During the episode, Jeannie sings "Everytime." Guest stars: Herb Vigran, Jack Mulhall, Jim Cross, Jack Jones, and Phil Arnold.
7	7	"Jeannie in Greenwich Village"	Charles Isaacs	Jack Elinson and Charles Stewart	October 27, 1956
Jeannie decides she costs Al and Liz too much money by living with them, so she leaves to find her own apartment in Greenwich Village, where an eccentric artist gives her a lesson in how to get something to eat even when broke. During the episode, Jeannie sings "When We're Alone." Guest stars: Hans Conried, Isabelle Dwan, Robert F. Shield, and Arlen Stuart.
8	8	"Jeannie, the Caddie"	Les Goodwins	Stanley Shapiro and Fred Fox	November 10, 1956
Wanting to help golf club manufacturer Angus MacDonald reunite with his fiancé of 25 years, Jeannie lands a job as a golf caddie — even though she knows nothing about golf. During the episode, she sings "The Pastures of Your Heart." Guest stars: Tudor Owen, Parley Baer, Frank Wilcox, Frankie Darro, and Joan Sudlow.
9	9	"The MacLennan Hex"	Charles Isaacs	Stanley Shapiro and Fred Fox	November 17, 1956
Jeannie places a curse on one of Al's passengers because he is threatening Al's chances of winning his taxicab company's courteous driver award. During the episode, she sings "When You're Smiling." Guest stars: Will Wright, George E. Stone, Paul Cavanagh, Don Shelton, and Mason Curry.
10	10	"The Rock 'N' Roll Kid"	Les Goodwins	William Manhoff	November 24, 1956
A rock and roll musician who is romantically attracted to Jeannie tries to convert her to appreciating his music — and Jeannie finds herself involved in a floorshow at a local nightclub. During the episode, she sings "Don't Ask For More." Guest stars: Jerry Paris, Peggy Maley, and Glenn Turnbull.
11	11	"The Lost Jacket"	Les Goodwins	Warren Spector and Frank Fox	December 1, 1956
After Jeannie buys Al a jacket for his birthday, she loses it before she can give it to him — then discovers that a strange man claimed it at the taxicab company's lost and found department. During the episode, she sings "Who Cares?" Guest stars: Emory Parnell, Dick Ryan, Charles Victor, and Juney Ellis.
12	12	"The Donut Show"	Charles Isaacs	Jack Elinson and Charles Stewart	December 8, 1956
Alternative title "The Donut Machine." After Jeannie takes a job at a doughnut shop in Times Square in Manhattan, she disapproves of a sales contest the shop owner initiates. Nonetheless determined to win first prize — a trip to Washington, D.C. — she boosts her sales by staging her own Broadway show in the doughnut shop's window. During the episode, she sings "Bonnie Charlie (Will ye no come back again?)", "If You Knew Susie," and "Mad Dogs and Englishmen." Guest stars: Claude Stroud, Hazel Shermet, and Enrique Valadez.
13	13	"The Proprietor"	Leslie Goodwins	Stanley Shapiro and Fred Fox	December 15, 1956
After Al and Liz inherit some money and invest it in a Chinese restaurant, they make Jeannie its manager. During the episode, Jeannie sings "The Bonnie Banks o' Loch Lomond." Guest stars: Philip Ahn, Sammee Tong, Ray Parsons, and Madge Cleveland.
14	14	"Jeannie, the Cook"	James Kern	Charles Isaacs	December 22, 1956
The employment agency mistakenly refers Jeannie to a private home as a cook — and then she is required to serve an important formal dinner. During the episode, Jeannie sings "I Wanna Be Happy." Guest stars: Rolfe Sedan, Helen Kleeb, Leon M. Lontoc, Jack Rice, Tommy Duran, Tristam Coffin, and Ralph Sanford.
15	15	"Jeannie Gets Homesick"	Leslie Goodwins	Jack Elinson and Charles Stewart	December 29, 1956
After Jeannie becomes homesick for Scotland, Al and Liz try to cheer her up by hiring a bagpipe band and a sailor with a Scottish accent. During the episode, Jeannie sings "My One and Only Highland Fling." Guest stars: Dickie Henderson, Tudor Owen, Peter Leeds, Henry Kulky, Pat Comiskey, Richard Lupino, Irene Lang, and Helen Mayon.
16	16	"Jeannie, the Big Sister"	Charles Isaacs	Stanley Shapiro and Fred Fox	January 5, 1957
After Jeannie applies for United States citizenship, her Italian grocer, Gino, asks her to talk to his teenage son, Joey, who has been spending time with a bad crowd at the local pool room. After she visits the pool room to talk to Joey, the U.S. Immigration and Naturalization Service receives a report that she is involved in illegal gambling, putting her chance of U.S. citizenship in jeopardy — and when she tries to return stolen goods to a department store, she gets arrested for shoplifting. During the episode, she sings "Pick Yourself a Star." Guest stars: Nestor Paiva, Danny Richards, Jr., Eddie Ryder, Tom Brown, and Bob Shield.
17	17	"Jeannie, the Westerner"	Leslie Goodwins	Jack Elinson and Charles Stewart	January 12, 1957
Looking for a fresh angle to write about, a newspaperman takes Jeannie to the rodeo. Jeannie wants everything there to be authentic — but does not think the rodeo star is. During the episode, she sings "Boots and Saddles." Guest stars: Touch Jay Connors, Eddie Wallerf, Harry Lauter, and Emory Parnell.
18	18	"Jeannie, the Heiress"	Don Taylor	George Beck and Curt Siodmak	January 19, 1957
Jeannie acquires a large sum of money, and people who want to help her spend it soon surround her. During the episode, she sings "The Skye Boat Song." Guest stars: John Eldredge, Lyle Talbot, Jonathan Hole, Frank Sully, and Ralph Sanford.
19	19	"The Business Girl"	Leslie Goodwins	Nate Monaster	January 26, 1957
In an attempt to help Al and Liz, Jeannie seeks a job as an executive secretary and finds herself involved in the business world. Guest stars: D. J. Thompson, John Nathan Hole, Ruth Lee, Jess Kirkpatrick, and Howard Wright.
20	20	"Jeannie, the Girl Ranger"	Leslie Goodwins	Jack Elinson and Charles Stewart	February 2, 1957
Jeannie tries to help a troop of Girl Rangers in need of money to build a playground. During the episode, she sings "One Finger, One Thumb." Guest stars: Florenz Ames, Ruth Lee, David R. Alpert, Lynn Piper, and Ralph P. Manza.
21	21	"Jeannie's Income Tax"	Don Taylor	Jack Elinson and Charles Stewart	February 9, 1957
Jeannie files her income-tax return for the first time, and her complete honesty creates turmoil in the Internal Revenue Department. During the episode, she sings: "Side by Side." Guest stars: Herb Vigran, Larry Blake, Richard Collier, and Tim Murphy.
22	22	"Jeannie, the WAC"	Leslie Goodwins	Fred Fox and Maurice Richlin	February 16, 1957
When Jeannie contacts senior United States Army officers to try to get them to grant a weekend pass to a corporal, she creates so much confusion that she ends up as a Women's Army Corps recruit. During the episode, she sings the song "Love" from the 1946 movie Ziegfeld Follies. Guest stars: Douglas Dumbrille, Tristan Coffin, Charles Maxwell, Frank Jenks, Howard Wright, and Gil Frye.
23	23	"Jeannie, the Hostage"	Leslie Goodwins	Nate Monaster	February 23, 1957
After Jeannie gets a job as a dispatcher with the taxicab company Al drives for, she discovers that Al has a crush on her fellow dispatcher Gladys. Jeannie arranges for Al to go to her apartment, but on the way back a gangster named Mugsey takes Jeannie hostage while on his way to rob a store. During the episode, Jeannie sings "The Lady's in Love With You." Guest stars: Richard J. Reeves, Vera Marshe, and Howard Negley.
24	24	"Jeannie, the Policewoman"	Leslie Goodwins	Charles Isaacs and Jack Elinson	March 2, 1957
Jeannie becomes a member of the New York City Police Department, and after she is sworn to secrecy on her first assignment, Al becomes worried because of her unusual behavior. During the episode, she sings "Start All Over Again." Guest stars: Charles Bronson, Mary Treen, Emlen Davies, Murray Alper, and Darlene Fields.
25	25	"Jeannie Plays Cupid"	Leslie Goodwins	William Manhoff	March 9, 1957
Jeannie tries to get Al and an attractive new neighbor woman romantically interested in each other. During the episode, Jeannie sings "A Girl Like Me." Guest stars: Virginia Christine and Charles Maxwell.
26	26	"Three's a Crowd"	Leslie Goodwins	Nate Monaster	March 16, 1957
After Al and Liz decide Jeannie needs a boyfriend, they each arrange dates for her. Dressed as Martha Washington, Jeannie is to attend a costume ball and meet her date, who will be dressed as George Washington. At the ball, she finds three young men dressed as George Washington. During the episode, Jeannie sings "'S Wonderful." Guest stars: Glenn Turnbull, Stanley Adams, and Tod Griffin.

=== Season 2: The Jeannie Carson Show (1958) ===
No. overall	No. in season	Title	Directed by	Written by	Original release date
27	1	"The Landlord"	Rod Amateau	Charles Isaacs and Fred Fox	1958 (first-run syndication)
Jeannie has taken a job as an airline stewardess and moves to a new apartment. When she meets her new landlord, Charlie O'Connell, she discovers that he dislikes pets, leaving her wondering what to do with the dog she picked up on her first flight and the cat that two neighborhood boys bring to the apartment. During the episode, she sings "Happiness Is a Thing Called Joe" and "Poor Johnny One Note." Guest stars: Will Wright, John Wilder, David Whorf, Ron Hargrave, Donald Losby, and Brian Corcoran.
28	2	"The Jam"	Chris Nyby	Charles Isaacs and Fred Cox	1958 (first-run syndication)
Jeannie decides to promote Mother Flanagan's jam by getting all of the airline stewardesses to request that their passengers ask their local supermarkets to stock it — but it turns out that Mother Flanagan is buying supermarket jam and putting her own labels on the bottles. Guest stars: John Litel, Mary Young, and Jonathan Hole.
29	3	"The Orphan"	Paul Landres	Jack Elinson and Charles Stewart	1958 (first-run syndication)
During a flight from San Francisco to New York City with a group of Korean orphans aboard, one of the orphans takes a liking to Jeannie when she mentions that she is a big baseball fan. After the flight lands in New York, the young boy heads for Jeannie's apartment instead of his adoptive parents' home — and Jeannie gets in big trouble. Guest stars: Warren Hsieh, Frank Wilcox, Ray Montgomery, and Frank Sully.
30	4	"The Bet"	William Redmond	Jack Elinson and Charles Stewart	1958 (first-run syndication)
Millionaire playboy Buck Matthews hires an entire plane for himself to fly from Boston to New York City. Jeannie is the stewardess on the flight. After the plane lands in New York, Buck invites her to join him for a wild night in the nightclubs of New York — and Jeannie tries to prove to Buck that money isn't everything by showing that she can go an entire day without spending any money. Guest stars: Chuck Connors, Fritz Feld, William Benedict, and Clegg Hoyt.
31	5	"The Highway"	Chris Nyby	Charles Isaacs and Fred Fox	1958 (first-run syndication)
Mr. O'Connell is displeased that the city plans to build a highway right through Jeannie's apartment building, so Jeannie decides to prove that the ground under the building is not safe to build a highway. Guest stars: John Eldredge, James Seay, Lewis Martin, and Jimmy Cross.
32	6	"The Rainmaker"	Leslie Goodwins	Charles Isaacs and Fred Fox	1958 (first-run syndication)
After Mike Flying Eagle, the chief of the Cheyenne, finishes a visit to Washington, D.C., in which he has asked the United States Government for drought relief, he boards a flight Jeannie is working, explains to her that there has been no rain in the Cheyenne's lands for many months, and tells her that the tribe will perform a rain dance the following day. After the flight lands, Jeannie and Herbert decide to help the tribe, so they hire a light plane and seed the clouds with ice while the tribe performs the dance. A downpour ensues, and the grateful chief makes Jeannie his daughter, giving her the name Little Rain Cloud. The rain also washes the grain that the Pawnee had just planted out of the ground, however, and the angry Pawnee have the local police arrest Jeannie. The Cheyenne stage a jail break for Jeannie, and the Pawnee chief declares war on the Cheyenne. A United States Department of Defense official arrives and meets with Jeannie, Flying Eagle, the Pawnee chief, and the local police chief to determine what to do. After Flying Eagle agrees to pay for the Pawnee's losses out of the money the Cheyenne get for their harvest, war is averted, and the police drop the charges against Jeannie. Guest stars: Robert Warwick, Monte Blue, James Burke, Douglass Dumbrille, Bob Bice. and David Alper.

== Critical response ==
A review in the trade journal Motion Picture Daily said, "As a Scottish immigrant, Miss Carson, despite an occasional accidental loss of her burr, pleased well and happily in an amusing little comedy." It added that a good following for the show was likely to develop.
