= Kathleen Nolan =

American actress; President of the SAG

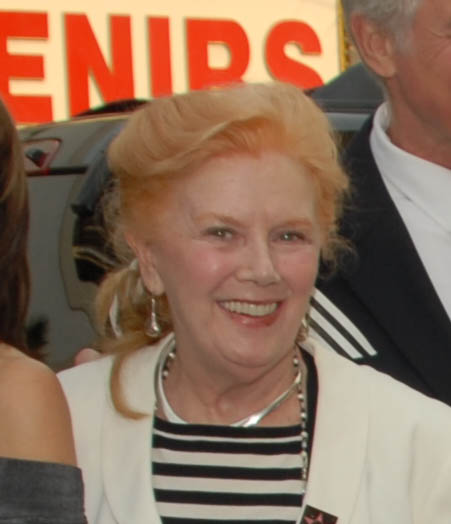
- Nolan in 2007
- Born: Joycelyn Schrum; September 27, 1933 (age 92); St. Louis, Missouri, U.S.
- Occupations: Actress, president of the Screen Actors Guild
- Years active: 1953–present
- Spouse: Richard Steven Heckenkamp (m. 1962; div. 1965)
- Children: Spencer Garrett

President of the Screen Actors Guild
- In office 1975–1979
- Preceded by: Dennis Weaver
- Succeeded by: William Schallert

Kathleen Nolan (born Joycelyn Schrum; September 27, 1933) is an American actress and former president of the Screen Actors Guild. From 1957 to 1962, she played Kate McCoy, a housewife, on the television series The Real McCoys.

== Early years ==
Born in St. Louis, Missouri, Nolan first appeared on stage on the showboat Goldenrod when she was 13 months old. She acted on the showboat for 12 years. Her family acted in tent shows and had their own troupe, the Circle Stock Company. She graduated from high school in St. Louis and sang on a radio station there.

== Stage ==
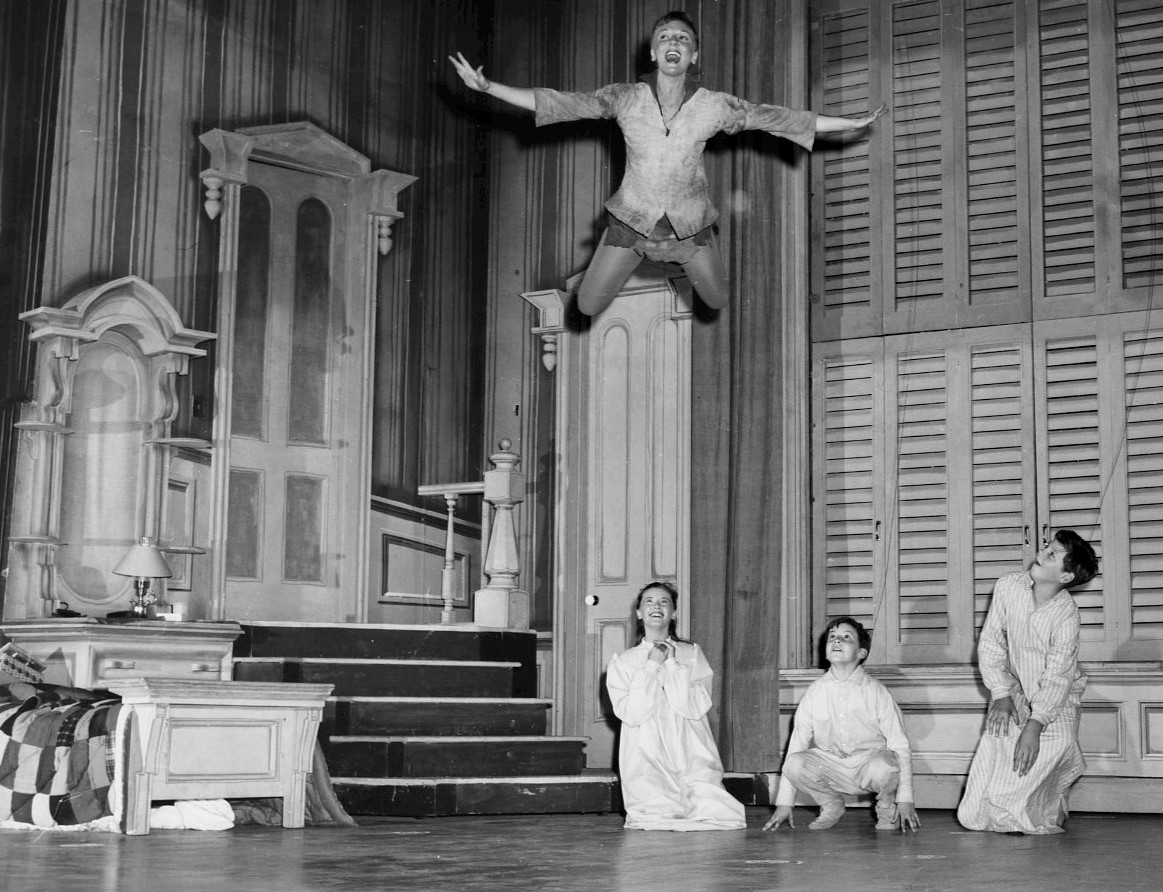
Nolan as Wendy in the original Broadway cast of Peter Pan starring Mary Martin (1954)

On Broadway, Nolan played Wendy in the original production of the Styne-Comden-Green musical version of Peter Pan (1954–1955), starring Mary Martin and Cyril Ritchard, a role she repeated in both the 1955 and 1956 live NBC-TV broadcasts on Producers' Showcase. A 1960 version was produced for television broadcast, and converted to videotape, but it does not feature Nolan because she was then deemed too old. One of the earlier black-and-white versions, with Nolan's revelatory, irrepressible performance, can be viewed by appointment at New York's Paley Center. Both the 1955 and 1956 TV broadcasts can be viewed on DVD releases from Video Artists International.

When Nolan was an usher at the Palace Theatre for Judy Garland's show, word got backstage to Garland that an usher (Nolan) could recreate her entire performance. Garland had, of course, never seen the show or her own staging, so she invited Nolan to perform the entire show while she sat in the house. Garland later recommended Nolan to the Peter Pan creators.

Nolan played Amy in Love in E-Flat (1967). Beyond Broadway, she "did major summer and winter theater ..."

== Television and film ==
Nolan spent most of her career on television, making her debut in an episode of The Philco Television Playhouse. She had a regular role as the teenaged cousin Liz in the 1953–1954 sitcom Jamie, starring Brandon deWilde in the title role.

Nolan made other appearances over the years on such series as Gunsmoke (1962 episode "Call Me Dodie" as the title character), The Lloyd Bridges Show, The Millionaire, The Untouchables, Breaking Point, Crossing Jordan, Ally McBeal, Chicago Hope, All My Children, Jacqueline Susann's Valley of the Dolls, Murder, She Wrote (1991 episode "The Prodigal Father"), Magnum, P.I. (episodes "The Ugliest Dog in Hawaii" in 1981 and "Double Jeopardy" in 1982, the last one in which Larry Pennell guest starred), The Incredible Hulk, Quincy M.E., The Love Boat, Charlie's Angels, The Rockford Files, The Bionic Woman, Kolchak: The Night Stalker, Love, American Style, Bewitched, The Big Valley, The Alfred Hitchcock Hour, Thriller, Burke's Law, Meet McGraw, and Ben Casey.

Nolan's best-known television role was as Kate, the wife of Luke McCoy (Richard Crenna), on the popular sitcom The Real McCoys. On February 23, 1961, she was thrown from a horse and injured during the filming of an episode. She then missed four months of work and was "in and out of the hospital many times" before returning to the series to perform in the episode broadcast on June 15, 1961. Nolan left The Real McCoys before its final season (1962–1963). At the time, the series also switched networks from ABC to CBS. The time slot for The Real McCoys changed as well in the switch to CBS, moving from Thursday evenings to Sunday evenings opposite NBC's Bonanza. In the revamped story for the series, Nolan's character was said to have died.

Nolan appeared on McHale's Navy, which resulted in her own spin-off series Broadside, in which she led a cast that included Edward Andrews, Dick Sargent, Sheila James (in her last regular television series role), Lois Roberts, Joan Staley, George Furth, Arnold Stang, and Jimmy Boyd. Broadside had good ratings, but Universal Studios dropped the series after a single season.

Beyond television, she appeared as Burt Reynolds's love Claudia in the 2017 film The Last Movie Star.

== Awards ==
Nolan in 1980 received the Women in Film Crystal Award for outstanding women "who, through their endurance and the excellence of their work, have helped to expand the role of women within the entertainment industry".

In 1959, she was nominated for an Emmy Award for Best Supporting Actress (Continuing Character) in a Comedy Series for her work in The Real McCoys.

== Other activities ==
Nolan served for two terms as the first female president of the Screen Actors Guild (1975–79). She also served on SAG's board of directors for a dozen years.

Nolan is a life member of the Actors Studio and a recipient of the Women in Film Crystal Award. In 1978, President Jimmy Carter appointed Nolan to the board of the Corporation for Public Broadcasting.

== Personal life ==
Nolan married Richard Heckenkamp, a "personal manager for celebrities", on November 4, 1962. They were divorced on May 19, 1965. They had a son, Spencer Garrett.

== Filmography ==
=== Television ===
Year	Title	Role	Notes
1957–1962	The Real McCoys	Kate McCoy	
1958	Tombstone Territory	Rose	Episode: "Rose of the Rio Bravo"
1962	Gunsmoke	Dodie	Episode: "Call Me Dodie"
1962	Alfred Hitchcock Hour	Linda Brennan	Season 1 Episode 7: "Annabel"
1964	Alfred Hitchcock Hour	Dorothy Johnson	Season 2 Episode 21: "Beast in View"
1964	Gunsmoke	Liz	Season 9 Episode: "Comanches is Soft"
1964-1965	Broadside	Lt. Anne Morgan	starring role, 32 episodes
1966	Bewitched	Gerry O'Toole	Season 3 Episode 5: "A Most Unusual Wood Nymph"
1973	Gunsmoke	Nellie Stuart	Episode: "Susan Was Evil"
1974	Kolchak: The Night Stalker	Faye	Episode: "Vampire"
1976	The Bionic Woman	Mother Superior	Episode: "Sister Jaime"
1981	The Incredible Hulk	Warden Hackett	Episode: "Two Godmothers"
1997	Steel Chariots	Ethyl Tucker	TV movie
