= One Happy Family =

American TV sitcom series (1961)

- Genre: Sitcom
- Created by: Sid Dorfman; Al Lewis
- Theme music composer: Harry Ruby
- Opening theme: "One Happy Family"
- Composer: Jeff Alexander
- Country of origin: United States
- Original language: English
- No. of seasons: 1
- No. of episodes: 15

Production
- Producers: Sid Dorfman; Al Lewis
- Camera setup: Multi-camera
- Running time: 25 minutes
- Production companies: Mark Goodson-Bill Todman Productions; The One Happy Family Company

Original release
- Network: NBC
- Release: January 13 – June 23, 1961

One Happy Family is an American sitcom television series where newlyweds Dick and Penny Cooper live with both her parents ("The Hogans") and grandparents ("The Hacketts") all in the same house together that aired from January 13 until September 15, 1961. It was broadcast on Fridays from 8 to 8:30 p.m. Eastern Time.

== Premise ==
Unable to afford a place of their own, a meteorologist (Dick Cooper) and his wife (Penny Cooper) decided to move in with her parents (Barney and Mildred Hogan) and grandparents (Charley and Lovey Hackett) in the same house together.

== Cast ==
- Dick Sargent as Dick Cooper
- Jody Warner as Penny Cooper
- Chick Chandler as Barney Hogan
- Elisabeth Fraser as Mildred Hogan
- Jack Kirkwood as Charlie Hackett
- Cheerio Meredith as Lovey Hackett
- Willard Waterman as Mr. Douglas (2 episodes)
- Maurice Gosfield as Fred (1 episode)
- James Komack as Perkins (1 episode)
- George Tobias as Mr. Kendall (1 episode)

== Episodes ==
No.	Title	Directed by	Written by	Original release date
1	"For Better or Worse"	Al Lewis	Sid Dorfman & Al Lewis	January 13, 1961
2	"Love's Big Omelette"	Al Lewis	Sid Dorfman & Al Lewis	January 20, 1961
3	"Love Me, Love My Duck"	Al Lewis	Sid Dorfman & Al Lewis	January 27, 1961
4	"Youth Is For The Young"	Al Lewis	Ben Gershman & Leo Solomon	February 3, 1961
5	"Barney Gives Dick the Business"	Al Lewis	Sid Dorfman & Al Lewis	February 10, 1961
6	"Charley's Birthday"	Al Lewis	Bob Fisher & Alan Lipscott	February 17, 1961
7	"Charley, Executive at Large"	Al Lewis	Seaman Jacobs & Si Rose	February 24, 1961
8	"Rain on Saturday"	Unknown	Unknown	March 3, 1961
9	"Sky Diver"	Unknown	Unknown	March 10, 1961
10	"Shut Up, I Love You"	Unknown	Unknown	May 12, 1961
11	"Mildred for President"	Unknown	Unknown	May 19, 1961
12	"Big Night Out"	Unknown	Unknown	May 26, 1961
13	"Dick's TV Debut"	Unknown	Unknown	June 9, 1961
14	"The Tycoons"	Unknown	Unknown	June 16, 1961
15	"My Country Club 'Tis of Thee"	Unknown	Unknown	June 23, 1961

== Reruns ==
The show has aired on Decades in the past.
