= Sheila Kuehl =

American actor and politician

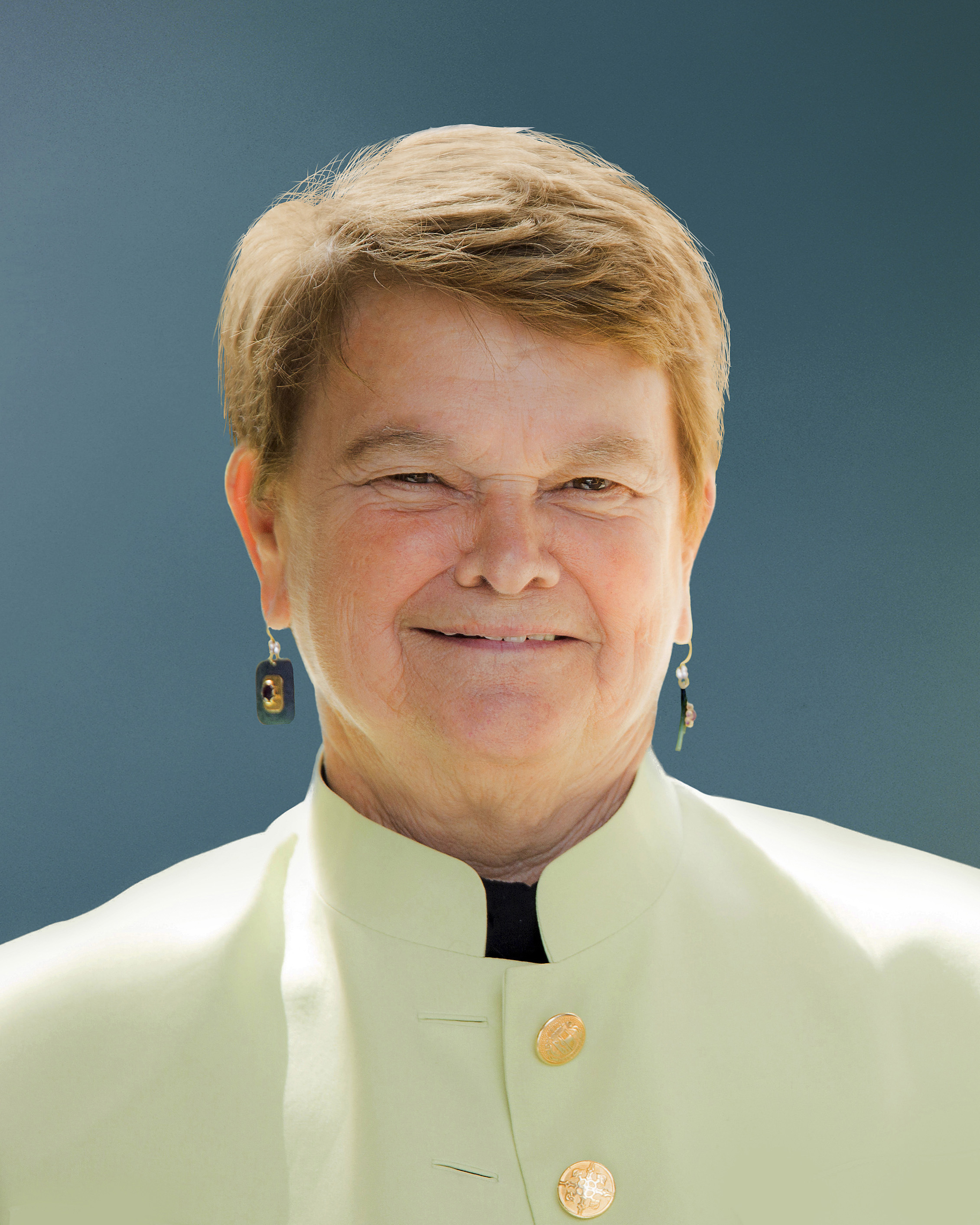
- Official portrait, 2017

Chair of Los Angeles County
- In office December 5, 2017 – December 4, 2018
- Preceded by: Mark Ridley-Thomas
- Succeeded by: Janice Hahn

Chair Pro Tem of Los Angeles County
- In office December 7, 2021 – December 6, 2022
- Preceded by: Holly Mitchell
- Succeeded by: Lindsey Horvath
- In office December 6, 2016 – December 5, 2017
- Preceded by: Mark Ridley-Thomas
- Succeeded by: Janice Hahn

Member of the Los Angeles County Board of Supervisors from the 3rd District
- In office December 1, 2014 – December 5, 2022
- Preceded by: Zev Yaroslavsky
- Succeeded by: Lindsey Horvath

Member of the California Senate from the 23rd district
- In office December 4, 2000 – November 30, 2008
- Preceded by: Tom Hayden
- Succeeded by: Fran Pavley

Member of the California State Assembly from the 41st district
- In office December 5, 1994 – November 30, 2000
- Preceded by: Terry B. Friedman
- Succeeded by: Fran Pavley

Personal details
- Born: Sheila Ann Kuehl; February 9, 1941 (age 85) Tulsa, Oklahoma, U.S.
- Party: Democratic
- Education: University of California, Los Angeles; Harvard Law School
- Profession: Attorney, actress

Sheila James Kuehl (born February 9, 1941) is an American politician and retired actress, who served as a member of the Los Angeles County Board of Supervisors for the 3rd District from 2014 to 2022. Kuehl was California's first openly gay state legislator, having previously served in the California State Senate and the California State Assembly, where she was the Assembly's first female speaker pro tem.

== Early life ==
Kuehl was born Sheila Ann Kuehl in Tulsa, Oklahoma. Her father, Arthur, was an airplane construction worker at Douglas Aircraft. He was Catholic and her mother, Lillian, was Jewish. As a child actress, Kuehl performed under the stage name Sheila James.

At age seven, Kuehl began to take tap dancing lessons. In one recital, Kuehl played an assistant in a skit called "The Old Sleuth" where she sat under a table listening for clues. To indicate she was listening, Kuehl made faces, which caused the audience to laugh and encouraged her to make more faces, resulting in more laughter. The skit was ruined, but the drama teacher, Mrs. Meglin, was impressed. Kuehl later recalled that Meglin told her mother, 'The kid's pretty funny. Can she read?' And my mother said, 'Oh, yeah, she can read, she skipped two grades, she's really very good.' Mrs. Meglin said, 'There's a radio series holding interviews...at an agent's office on Sunset Boulevard. Would you be interested in taking her to the interview? All she has to do is read...' So we went for the interview and there were like 150 or 200 kids there and all you did was read. And I was called back...and eventually I got the part in what probably was the last family radio series before it went all music and news...'"

== Career ==
=== Radio ===
Having landed the role at the age of eight, Kuehl (billed as Sheila James) starred with radio and film veterans Penny Singleton, Gale Gordon, Bea Benaderet, and Jim Backus on the family radio program The Penny Williamson Show airing live from Studio B of the NBC studios in Hollywood. Airing in the adjacent studios were the popular drama The Cisco Kid and The Bob Hope Show with Doris Day (whom Kuehl admired). Kuehl would later cite her interaction with the other NBC radio talent as influential in forming her professionalism and comedy skills. The show centered around Singleton playing Penny Williamson, a widow selling real estate in a small town to support two daughters (played by Kuehl and Mary Lee Robb). The show was "a light-hearted pitch for women's liberation, portraying Penny and her daughters as highly competent, self-sufficient females" dealing with bungling suitors competing for Penny's affections.

=== Television ===
Due to her radio talent, Kuehl's agent convinced her parents to take her to auditions for a television role. Kuehl was signed to play Jackie, Stuart Erwin's tomboy daughter, in the television series The Stu Erwin Show (also known as Trouble with Father), which ran from 1950 to 1955. Kuehl later recalled "The same 200 kids I think were there for the interview [as had been for the radio audition] and I was called back and called back and called back and eventually I got that part. And beginning in 1950, I did that series for six years."

After The Stu Erwin Show ended, Kuehl continued to work as an actress while going to school. Her academic success allowed her to skip two grades; by sixteen she was attending the University of California, Los Angeles. As her college studies continued she moved into a sorority house and began spending summers as a counsellor for a children's camp. At the age of eighteen, while working at the camp, Kuehl met a twenty-one year-old counsellor named Kathy and fell in love. Kuehl would later recall "It was just a funny attraction that neither of us would acknowledge. Then, one night she and I were sitting together at her place. She was rubbing my back and we just, like, went to bed. It was wonderful. But then we stayed up all night wondering if we were really sick." They concluded that they were "sick" but that nothing could be done. Kuehl later recalled "There was no movement then. There was nothing to read. I knew no lesbians. We just figured this was a rare thing and that we were two women who'd fallen in love and that we had to keep it a secret because nobody would approve. We didn't dare tell a soul." After that summer, with Kathy going to school in San Diego, the two exchanged passionate letters daily for a year.

==== The Many Loves of Dobie Gillis ====
During this time, Kuehl began acting the role for which she is probably best known – her portrayal of teen-aged genius Zelda Gilroy, the would-be girlfriend of the title character in the television series The Many Loves of Dobie Gillis, which aired on CBS from 1959 to 1963. Zelda was originally intended to be a one-shot character in the early Dobie Gillis episode "Love is a Science," but Dobie creator Max Shulman liked Kuehl and had her signed on as a semiregular cast member.

Kuehl later recalled how she landed the part. "Well, when you're an actor with an agent, no matter how old you are, you go on interviews. I went on lots of interviews for lots of guest shots... and I had done two [episodes] on Love that Bob [The Bob Cummings Show] with Bob Cummings and Dwayne Hickman, who played his nephew, and the director Rod Amateau, so I had met all the people who eventually were going to be much of the team for Dobie Gillis. In 1959, I was at UCLA, and I went on an interview for Dobie Gillis and I walked on the set and they all said, 'Oh, hi, we know your work, you're fine. Just go across the street and meet Max Schulman [the writer director].' As it turned out, Max and I were the same height, and he was like buried behind the desk when I walked in. And he said, 'What's the first line?' And I said, 'I love you.' And he said, 'You're hired!'"

Signing a contract with Dobie producer 20th Century Fox Television required Kuehl, then 18 and in college studying theater, to change her major to English, so that Shulman, also a successful author, could act as her proctor on set to allow her to continue her studies. Kuehl earned a bachelor's degree in English from the University of California at Los Angeles in 1962, during the show's final season.

Having signed a contract in 1960 to do 21 shows for the next season of Dobie, that same year Kuehl was elected an officer in both the university student government and in her sorority. Despite this success, things became difficult that summer when love letters to Kathy that she had accidentally left at the sorority house were found by the cleaning staff and turned over to the alumnae council of the sorority. When she returned from summer vacation, the council (while speaking in coded language and carefully avoiding the word "lesbian") confronted Kuehl with the letters demanding an explanation. Kuehl later recalled that at first, she tried to deny it and failing that, "I then just clammed up and took my sorority pin off and put it on the table and left. I cried all the way home." She was officially expelled from the sorority and despite assurance that no one would be told why, she was aware that rumors were spreading. Some of the members of the sorority refused to speak to her afterwards and avoided her. Kuehl moved back in with her parents under the cover story that she was homesick, but was still a member of the sorority of which they knew she loved being a part. Whenever her parents knew of a sorority meeting taking place, to prevent discovery, Kuehl would go to a coffee shop during that time and return with a story about the events of the meeting that she had not attended.

Despite Kathy moving to Los Angeles and their being able to see each other daily, the social sacrifices Kuehl was contemplating put a strain on their relationship. Kuehl later recalled, "By then, the whole idea of being queer was so overwhelming and scary. Not the sexuality, but the loss of everything. To be that way for good meant no family, no children, no career, nor normalcy, no parents. It seemed at that point that I should really get out of it. I told [Kathy] I didn't want to see her any longer." Kuehl had seen a man casually on and off during her relationship with Kathy and began working to make it more serious. They kissed, but they did not have sex and they almost got engaged. Kuehl could not get Kathy off her mind and broke up with the man to resume the relationship with her. Kuehl's closeted relationship with Kathy continued until the beginning of the 1970s, and had lasted 12 years before they broke up.

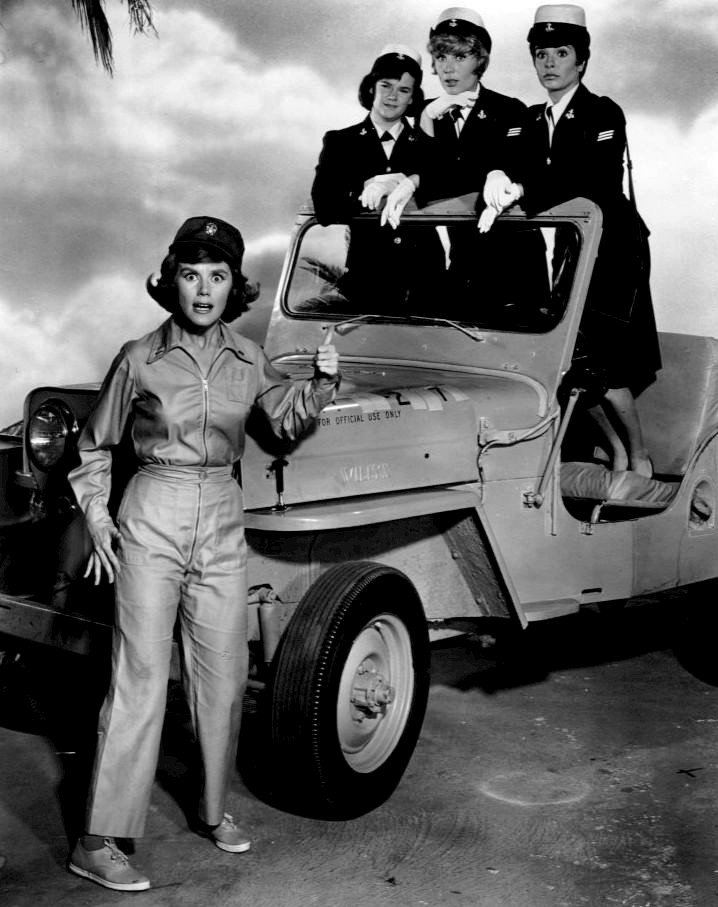
Kuehl (standing on Jeep, left) on Broadside, 1964

After Dobie Gillis ended its run, Kuehl (as "Sheila James") co-starred with Kathleen Nolan, formerly of The Real McCoys, in the short-lived ABC television series Broadside, a female version of McHale's Navy, in its 1964–65 season.

Opportunities for acting work steadily diminished and Kuehl was forced to sell her Malibu house. She later recalled this period, saying, "I couldn't even get a commercial." Due to worries about her career and being closeted, she fell into a serious depression and developed a drinking problem. She was able to move forward after seeking help. She then moved in with her then-girlfriend, Kathy, and began working at the UCLA student activities office helping students organize around the rising political movements of the 1960s.

Kuehl made television guest appearances on National Velvet; McHale's Navy; The Donna Reed Show; The Beverly Hillbillies; Petticoat Junction; The Adventures of Ozzie & Harriet; Marcus Welby, M.D.; and The Ed Sullivan Show from 1963 to 1970. On Petticoat Junction, Kuehl joined the Bradley sisters in a band called The Ladybugs, which was created to compete with Beatlemania. Kuehl, along with Jeannine Riley, Pat Woodell, and Linda Kaye Henning appeared as moptop singers performing "I Saw Him Standing There" on a March 1964 episode of Sullivan's show, just weeks after the Beatles had performed "I Saw Her Standing There".

By the end of the decade, acting roles had dried up for her. Though Kuehl "can't state with certainty that she was blacklisted" from further acting jobs over her sexuality, she claims that afterwards, "with few exceptions, the phone stopped ringing." A pilot for a Dobie Gillis spin-off, in which the character Zelda was the lead, was produced, but the president of CBS, Jim Aubrey, thought Kuehl was "too butch" to be a star for their network. Subsequently, the pilot was not promoted and did not sell, but Kuehl was not told about this immediately. Rather, she was informed by the director, Rod Amateau, when she arrived to shoot the following episodes. She was devastated by the news.

Kuehl's only acting roles beyond 1970 were in two Dobie Gillis reunion projects - a 1977 sitcom pilot produced by James Komack, Whatever Happened to Dobie Gillis?, and a 1988 television movie sequel, Bring Me the Head of Dobie Gillis. In both productions, Dobie had married Zelda and the two were running the Gillis family grocery store and raising a teenaged son named Georgie Gillis.

Reflecting on the lasting impact of her role as Zelda, Kuehl told an interviewer, "First, there were no smart girls on television, period. All the girls were better looking than me, but dumb. I didn't mean the actresses were dumb, but that was sort of what you had to be in those days. So, a smart girl, brash, did not know she was a loser, which was sort of the theme for all the characters on Dobie Gillis…you just keep doing what you are doing because you don't know there's anything wrong with you. And the other thing, of course, 20 years later I started getting letters from young women saying, 'You were such a role model for me,' and now that the women's movement had started, I could see why. An independent, smart girl, knew what she wanted, went after it, but not in a mean way. And always by the end of the show, if you were doing anything dishonest against your friends, you would repent, because friendship was always the most important thing."

=== Law ===
After leaving the acting profession in the early 1970s, Kuehl became an adviser to students in campus activist groups at her alma mater, UCLA, and eventually became an associate dean of students. When Kuehl was passed over for a promotion that was given to a man, Kuehl felt that her treatment had been unfair and became interested in a legal career to address the position of women in the workplace.

In 1975, at age 34, after being denied admission into UCLA, Kuehl was accepted at Harvard Law School. In her third year she was elected class marshal and president of the student council. She received her J.D. in 1978. During her final year, she chaired the celebration of the 25th anniversary of the first group of women to be admitted to the law school, and became the second woman to win Harvard's prestigious Ames Moot Court Competition, judged by a panel including Supreme Court Justice Thurgood Marshall. Kuehl recalled that the Justice "strode over to me, clasped my hand in his two huge hands and said, 'Lady, I like your style.'" Kuehl was recognized in the ABA's Law Student Division magazine as one of the nation's top five law students.

It was while at Harvard that Kuehl came to grips with her sexuality. She later recalled:

So it wasn't until I went to [Harvard] law school in my thirties that I fell in love again with a woman after having dated lots of men in between, and I thought 'Oh, no, this is really who I am.' And by then in the mid-seventies, there was consciousness about being gay. My second partner was out…and I was still in the closet I thought, [but] I wasn't really in the closet at school. It's just sort of like you creep out a little at a time. But there was no movement, no organization, no club at Harvard, and so when we came back and lived together, it only lasted a couple of years and she left. I was so broken-hearted but I had no one to talk to. I hadn't told anyone I was even in a relationship. So I decided to come out to my sister and then my friends and very shortly thereafter my parents. And that was probably '79, so I was 38. So I knew I was gay when I fell in love with a woman for the second time. It wasn't an aberration for me….

After law school, Kuehl became an associate at Richards, Watson & Gershon in Los Angeles, where her practice focused on municipal law. She later became an associate at Bersch & Kaplowitz in Beverly Hills, practicing family, anti-discrimination, and civil rights law.

While working in private practice in Los Angeles Kuehl began fund-raising for the Sojourn Center for Battered Women (at which she eventually served as chair). Staff from other shelters soon began asking Kuehl for legal advice and training in domestic-violence law. Kuehl later recalled this time saying "I had to learn what there was, which wasn't much." She then joined a handful of other lawyers in trying to assist in crafting legislation on the issue which included a bill that required judges in custody cases to consider evidence of domestic violence.

In the 1980s Kuehl became an adjunct law professor at the University of Southern California, and later an associate professor at Loyola Law School where she taught courses on family law, sex discrimination, and education.

During her 1986 inauguration as president of the Women Lawyers' Association of Los Angeles, Kuehl introduced Torie Osborn as her partner in the same manner that previous presidents had introduced their husbands. The incident became the lead story of California's daily law journal. (The pair would later separate in 1991, but remained close friends).

In 1989, along with Abby Leibman and Jenifer McKenna, Kuehl formed the California Women's Law Center to promote gender issues, including expanding the rights of divorced women and reforming hiring procedures in male-dominated professions, such as law enforcement.

== California State Assembly ==
Kuehl was elected to the California State Assembly in 1994, becoming the first openly gay person elected to the California legislature. While running for office, Kuehl found she was able to offset some negative stereotypes people had about lesbians thanks to their familiarity with her role as Zelda. She told an interviewer, "When people know gay people personally, they tend to feel differently about the whole community. And all of a sudden, here's a person that they knew very well that they found out was lesbian."

In office, Kuehl became a founding member of the California Legislative LGBT Caucus. She recalled "My Democratic colleagues were enormously welcoming. I mean it was more than I could have expected. I walked into my first Democratic caucus and Antonio Villaraigosa, Kevin Murray, Barbara Friedman, John Burton, and probably three or four other folks came up to me and said, 'We don't want you to have to eat lunch by yourself, so we are the honorary Gay and Lesbian Caucus.' It was lovely."

When Kuehl was elected as a Democrat to the California Assembly in 1994, a Republican majority was seated for the first time in 20 years. This was due largely as an out-flowing of the enthusiasm stoked up by Newt Gingrich's strategy supporting Republicans for congressional and senatorial seats. Kuehl recalled, "The Republican majority was quite a different kind of Republican, not a moderate, not a Rockefeller Republican. They were primarily Bible-thumpers and very right-wing. So, it was not the most welcoming Republican group, though they loved Zelda Gilroy, and it was very difficult for them because they already liked me so much…. And to their surprise, we all got along very well. ...The Republicans were pretty horrible about LGBT stuff. They all virtually said stuff like, 'Well, they're all spawn of the devil, oh, but not you, Sheila….'"

One of the first acts Kuehl did while in the Assembly was to introduce a bill (The Dignity for All Students Act – AB 222) to protect public-school students from discrimination on the basis of sexual orientation. The bill was supported by most of her fellow Democrats whom Kuehl later recalled were brought "into a space where they were in a civil rights movement where they had never been at their age and they were feeling it and felt good about themselves when they would stand up and support me." The debate was cited by the media, such as the LA Times, for its moving speeches, most notably Assemblyman Tom Torlakson's support of the bill which included a here-to unknown revelation that his brother had been bisexual and died of AIDS. The bill failed to pass the Assembly by one vote (it was opposed by 37 lawmakers, including seven Democrats). Supporters of the bill blamed "a state-wide public relations campaign by anti-gay groups aimed at moderate Democrats" which "featured mailers, newspaper ads and protests largely targeted at Latino lawmakers." Kuehl's opponents also held that the "proposal would open the door to a sweeping gay agenda in public schools." Republican Assemblyman Bruce Thompson claimed the bill wasn't about "civil rights, but it's about special rights [for homosexuals]," and it's "the issue that will divide this state and country more than any other."

While in the Assembly, Kuehl served as speaker pro tempore during the 1997–98 legislative session, becoming the first woman in California history to hold the position. Kuehl served three full terms (six years) in the California Assembly, which was the maximum allowed under term limits that had been adopted in 1990.

== California State Senate ==
After three terms in the Assembly, Kuehl was elected to the California State Senate in 2000, beating Assemblyman Wally Knox in the Democratic primary and becoming the first openly gay person elected to the Senate. Re-elected in 2004 with 65.7% of the vote, she was repeatedly voted the "smartest" member of the California Legislature.

In 2002 Kuehl co-authored the Religious Freedom and Civil Marriage Protection Act that defined marriage as a civil contract between two persons. The bill went on to pass the state legislature – the first time a state legislative body in the USA voted to approve same-sex marriage rather than respond to a court order to do so. The bill was vetoed on September 7, 2005, by Republican Governor Arnold Schwarzenegger, who held that the matter should be decided by the courts or by popular referendum.

In 2004, Gavin Newsom, the mayor of San Francisco, held that denying homosexuals the right to marry was a violation of the due process clause in the California Constitution and allowed them to go forward (until a later Court order was made). After the mayor's announcement Kuehl presided over a number of same-sex marriages on the steps of San Francisco's City Hall rotunda. Among those whose wedding she officiated was Assemblymember Jackie Goldberg (who authored AB 205, a sweeping domestic partner benefits law) and her partner for twenty-eight years Sharon Stricker (a poet and activist). The couple's newly married son and daughter-in-law were in attendance. Kuehl also officiated over the weddings of Torie Osborn and her partner, Lydia Vaias; Jehan Agrama and Dwora Fried; Patti Giggans and Ellen Ledley; Barrie Levy and Linda Garnets; and Avi Rose and Ron Strochlic. Assemblymember Mark Leno (who had recently introduced a bill to change the family code to allow marriage equality) also attended the ceremonies giving a blessing in English and Hebrew to the couples.

Also in 2004, Kuehl authored Senate Bill 1234, an omnibus act intended to protect Californians from hate crimes, which the bill defined as criminal acts committed in whole or in part because of the victims' actual or perceived disability, gender, nationality, race or ethnicity, religion, sexual orientation or association with persons with any of those characteristics. The bill targeted crimes, not First Amendment-protected speech. It also protected undocumented immigrants from deportation due to reporting hate crimes, increased civil protections from discrimination, and provided for law enforcement training concerning crimes against homeless persons and law enforcement response to homelessness; the bill was later enacted into law.

In 2006, Kuehl sponsored a bill to prohibit the adoption by any school district in California of any instructional material that discriminates against persons based on their gender or sexual orientation.

Throughout her career as a legislator, Kuehl took a leadership role on health care policy. Her foremost objective was securing passage of legislation to establish a single-payer health care system in California. SB 840 passed both houses of the legislature in 2006, but was vetoed by Schwarzenegger; it was reintroduced in 2007. SB 840 passed both houses of the California legislature in August 2008 and was, again, vetoed by Schwarzenegger.

On January 28, 2008, The New York Times reported that Kuehl planned to vote against a health care plan sponsored by Governor Schwarzenegger and supported by a majority of Democrats in the Assembly, while opposed by a majority of Republicans. Her opposition along with the opposition of Senator Leland Yee led the Times to predict that California's widely touted healthcare bill – widely but inaccurately called "universal" coverage – would be effectively killed. However, by the time the bill came to the Senate Health Committee, chaired by Kuehl, all but one of the Democratic Senators on the committee had grave doubts about the bill and, after an eleven-hour hearing on the bill and an intervening week to caucus, on January 28, 2008, one Democrat voted yes, three abstained and three (including Kuehl), along with all Republicans, voted in opposition.

During her time in the state Legislature Kuehl authored bills pertaining to domestic violence, child support services, family leave, and discrimination based on gender, disability and sexual orientation. Later when speaking to an interviewer she reflected "I was a women's rights attorney and a law professor. My interest was primarily issues of equality on the basis of gender, whether it was workplace discrimination, protection from domestic violence and sexual assault, child care, custody issues for married women. That was my area of expertise, so we started with that. I had participated in writing virtually all of the domestic violence laws, and then brought bills to expand them once I was [in Sacramento]. I knew, that as the only gay person, it would fall to me to bring protective bills. And I chose the most difficult one first, because anything having to do with children is a flashpoint for the opposition. And so it was very difficult."

Kuehl served in the California Senate for two terms (eight years), the maximum allowed under term limits adopted in 1990.

== Los Angeles County Board of Supervisors ==
On November 4, 2014, Kuehl was elected to the Los Angeles County Board of Supervisors. She assumed office on December 1, 2014, thus becoming the first openly LGBTQ person to ever serve on the Board. As the representative of Los Angeles County's 3rd Supervisorial District, she served nearly two million residents, and was responsible for managing 431 square miles of land stretching from the Pacific Ocean to Los Feliz, and from Venice up to San Fernando. In 2018, she served as chair of the Board of Supervisors.

In her capacity as a supervisor, Kuehl served as chair of the Board of Commissioners of First 5 LA, First Vice Chair of the board of directors of LA Metro, and sat on the Board of the new Community Choice Aggregation (CCA) known as the Clean Power Alliance.

In her first three years on the Board, Kuehl undertook or collaborated in a number of initiatives and motions. A partial list of her work includes raising the minimum wage, creating a Citizens' Oversight Commission for the Sheriff's Department, providing funding and services for LA County's homeless population and those trying to find and keep affordable housing.

Kuehl previously had a ten-year romantic relationship with Torie Osborn, who served as a deputy mayor in L.A. Osborn went on to support Kuehl's run for supervisor and joined her staff as principal deputy for strategy and policy.

When running for supervisor Kuehl was asked if she missed acting and responded that the camaraderie in public service mirrored her favorite aspect of acting, and then stated "I suppose if I get to be a supervisor and then I'm termed out, I'll be, you know, fairly elderly but still able to do things, and then I guess my ambition would be to be Betty White for a couple of years."

Reflecting on her political career, Kuehl told an interviewer, "I was very proud of the fact that I wasn't too frightened to run for office as a gay person. [You imagine] people making anonymous phone calls in the middle of the night to tell you you're a horrible person only in worse language than that, or imagine getting spat at. It's the same thing people go through about coming out. But it turns out to be much better than you expect."

On November 24, 2020, the Los Angeles County Board of Supervisors voted to uphold the COVID-19-related county ban on outdoor dining, with Kuehl voting in favor of the ban and referring to the ongoing situation as a "serious health emergency".

In 2022, UCLA named her the Edward A. Dickson Alum of the Year.

On September 14, 2022, deputies from the Los Angeles County Sheriff's Department served Kuehl with a search warrant. The warrant was related to an investigation into Kuehl's involvement with an alleged "pay to play" scheme; a former County official claimed that Kuehl and others improperly awarded a series of contracts for sexual harassment training programs. A few days after the raids, the California Department of Justice took over the investigation. In an August 2024 court-approved agreement ending the investigation, they stated there was "insufficient evidence to support the filing of any criminal charges".

Kuehl did not seek re-election to the Board of Supervisors in 2022.

Political offices
Preceded by Terry Friedman	California State Assemblymember, 41st District; 1994–2000	Succeeded by Fran Pavley
Preceded by Tom Hayden	California State Senator, 23rd District; 2000–2008	Succeeded by Fran Pavley
Preceded by Mark Ridley-Thomas	Chair of Los Angeles County; 2017–2018	Succeeded by Janice Hahn
Preceded by Mark Ridley-Thomas	Chair Pro Tem of Los Angeles County; 2016-2017; 2021–2022	Succeeded by Janice Hahn
Preceded by Holly Mitchell	Chair Pro Tem of Los Angeles County; 2016-2017; 2021–2022	Succeeded by Lindsey Horvath
Preceded by Zev Yaroslavsky	Los Angeles County Board of Supervisors; District 3; 2014–2022	Succeeded by Lindsey Horvath
