= Fancy Pants (film) =

1950 film by George Marshall

- Theatrical re-release poster ca. 1961
- Directed by: George Marshall
- Screenplay by: Edmund L. Hartmann; Robert O'Brien
- Based on: Ruggles of Red Gap by Harry Leon Wilson
- Produced by: Robert L. Welch
- Starring: Bob Hope; Lucille Ball; Bruce Cabot; Jack Kirkwood
- Cinematography: Charles Lang
- Edited by: Archie Marshek
- Music by: Van Cleave
- Color process: Technicolor
- Production company: Paramount Pictures
- Distributed by: Paramount Pictures
- Release dates: August 30, 1950 (New York); September 20, 1950 (Los Angeles)
- Running time: 92 minutes
- Country: United States
- Language: English
- Box office: $2.6 million (US rentals)

Fancy Pants is a 1950 American romantic comedy Western film directed by George Marshall and starring Bob Hope and Lucille Ball. It is a musical adaptation of Ruggles of Red Gap (1935).

== Plot ==
A British actor attempts to impress two visiting American women, Efflie Floud and her tomboyish daughter Agatha, by asking the cast of his drawing-room comedy to pose as his aristocratic family. Effie persuades the butler character, Humphrey, really a struggling American actor named Arthur Tyler, to accompany them to the United States and help to refine her husband and daughter. She sends a telegram home referring to the person whom she believes is Humphrey as a "gentleman's gentleman", which the rural western townfolk misunderstand as meaning that he is an aristocrat and presumably Agatha's future husband. Arthur must now pretend to the family that he is the British butler while pretending to the rest of the town, and the visiting President Theodore Roosevelt, that he is a politically savvy Englishman. The deception is eventually uncovered, and the actor and the family's daughter gradually fall in love.

== Cast ==
- Bob Hope as Humphrey a.k.a. Arthur Tyler
- Lucille Ball as Agatha Floud (singing voice dubbed by Annette Warren)
- Bruce Cabot as Cart Belknap
- Jack Kirkwood as Mike Floud
- Lea Penman as Effie Floud
- Hugh French as George Van Basingwell
- Eric Blore as Sir Wimbley
- Joseph Vitale as Wampum
- John Alexander as Teddy Roosevelt
- Norma Varden as Lady Maude
- Virginia Keiley as Rosalind
- Colin Keith-Johnston as Twombley
- Joe Wong as Wong
- Olaf Hytten as stage manager (uncredited)

== Production ==
Three different endings were filmed, including a surprise ending shot on a closed set for secrecy.

== Reception ==
In a contemporary review for The New York Times, critic Bosley Crowther called Fancy Pants "a farce of unlimited proportions" and wrote: "Given appropriate assistance by red-headed Lucille Ball, Mr. Hope splits his vehicle wide open—and similarly imperils his audiences' sides. ... However, we've got to give credit to George Marshall and all the rest. They keep the nonsense spinning and accumulating without one slight relapse. ... Mr. Hope and everyone have taken a springy slapstick and laid it firmly and hilariously to 'Fancy Pants.'"

Critic Edwin Schallert of the Los Angeles Times wrote: "Slapstick runs rampant in the Technicolor production. George Marshall, who directed, is an expert at that sort of thing, and he and the writers, Edmund Hartmann and Robert O'Brien, seemed to have spared nothing. ... The total result is one of the weirdest, wildest jumbles of doings that has been seen on the screen in many a day, and a picture that has very little rhyme and certainly not much reason. Maybe they'll call it a burlesque, but even burlesque has to have a few sensible moments .... This is practically all nutty."

== See also ==
- List of American films of 1950
