= Code 3 (TV series) =

- Genre: Police drama
- Starring: Richard Travis
- Country of origin: United States
- Original language: English
- No. of seasons: 1
- No. of episodes: 39

Production
- Running time: 30 minutes
- Production companies: Rabco TV Productions; Hal Roach Studios

Original release
- Network: syndicated
- Release: March 9, 1956 – December 24, 1957

Code 3 is an American crime drama that originally aired in syndication from 1956 to 1957. The stories were all based on actual files of the Los Angeles sheriff's office.

Stories were presented from the viewpoint of Assistant Sheriff George Barrett. At the end of each episode, Eugene W. Biscailuz, "the actual sheriff of Los Angeles County," summarized the segment. The episodes are introduced by actor Richard Travis as Barrett, who provides narration throughout. It is mostly an anthology series with new lead characters in each episode.

== Title ==
The title is an "emergency signal alerting officers to proceed to the destination with red light and siren and with all possible haste."

== Cast ==
- Richard Travis as Assistant Sheriff George Barrett
- Christopher Dark as Sgt. Al Zavala (four episodes)
- Denver Pyle as Sergeant Murchison
- Fred Wynn as Lieutenant Bill Hollis

== Guest stars ==
- Claude Akins
- Lola Albright
- Don "Red" Barry
- James Best
- Whit Bissell
- Paul Brinegar
- Sally Brophy
- Jean Byron
- Mike Connors
- Hans Conried
- Russ Conway
- Lloyd Corrigan
- Walter Coy
- Virginia Christine
- Virginia Dale
- Ted de Corsia
- Richard Deacon
- Francis De Sales
- Bobby Diamond
- Lawrence Dobkin
- Ann Doran
- John Doucette
- Bill Erwin
- Douglas Fowley
- Dabbs Greer
- Robert Griffin
- James Griffith
- Stacy Harris
- Harry Harvey, Jr.
- Susan Seaforth Hayes
- Robert Horton
- Vivi Janiss
- Russell Johnson
- DeForest Kelley
- Ray Kellogg
- Don Kennedy
- Douglas Kennedy
- Brett King
- Helen Kleeb
- Harry Lauter
- Peter Leeds
- Nan Leslie
- Judi Meredith (as Judi Boutin)
- Gregg Palmer
- Jerry Paris
- Paul Picerni
- John M. Pickard
- Richard Reeves
- Paul Richards
- Bing Russell
- Dick Sargent
- William Schallert
- Richard Shannon
- George Sowards
- Kenneth Tobey
- Peter van Eyck
- Herb Vigran
- Eddie Waller
- Beverly Washburn
- Frank Wilcox
- Guy Williams
- Rhys Williams
- Michael Winkelman
- Grant Withers
- Gil Gerard (4 episodes)

== Episodes ==
| No. | Title | Directed by | Written by | Original release date |
|---|---|---|---|---|
| 1 | "The Rookie Sheriff" | Peter Godfrey | Jack Bennett | April 2, 1957 |
A rookie sheriff's experience as a Czech refugee makes him feel that brute force is essential.
| 2 | "The Road Back" | Peter Godfrey | Paul Franklin | April 9, 1957 |
Confined to an honor camp after attempting to kill a man he believes is interested in his wife, a man keeps brooding. He's convinced that his suspicions are right and he makes a break.
| 3 | "The Print With A Face" | George Waggner | Lee Loeb | April 16, 1957 |
A wealthy widow is found murdered and robbed. Lt. Morse is sent to investigate.
| 4 | "The Guilty Ones" | Paul Landres | John Robinson | April 23, 1957 |
Hoping to avoid further violence, victims of teenage hoodlums refuse to testify against them.
| 5 | "The Menace" | George Waggner | Jack Laird | April 30, 1957 |
A wealthy man joins the police in a search for his teenage daughter, who is suspected of being a psychopathic killer.
| 6 | "The Uninvited" | George Waggner | Paul Franklin | May 7, 1957 |
A bank manager and his family are terrorized by a killer who has invaded their home.
| 7 | "The Greener Grass" | George Franklin | Paul Franklin | May 14, 1957 |
A young man is sent to an honor farm where he is given the chance of working in the open, working away from locked cells and prison regulations. An older man tries to give him good advice, but the younger man is bent on escape.
| 8 | "The Fugitive" | Owen Crump | Paul Franklin | May 21, 1957 |
The Los Angeles sheriff's office is ordered to track down a fugitive from Arizona. A burglary, kidnapping and attempted murder prompt the police of two states to join forces in a manhunt. The only clue to the man's identity is a book of matches which he stole from a gift shop.
| 9 | "The Fishing Trip" | George Waggner | Jack Laird | May 28, 1957 |
Nancy McGiven reports that her husband is missing. The police investigators learn that McGiven rented a fishing boat - which is found empty and adrift.
| 10 | "Gold in an Old Tin Can" | Wilhelm Thiele | Herbert Abbott Spiro | June 4, 1957 |
Fred Munson is arrested for the embezzlement of $500,000. He refuses to reveal where the unspent money is hidden, even to obtain a more lenient sentence.
| 11 | "The Bite" | Owen Crump | Jerry D. Lewis | June 11, 1957 |
A young ex-convict tries to catch a robber. During the scuffle the robber is killed and he flees from the scene to hide from the police, unaware that he has been bitten by a rabid dog.
| 12 | "Oil Well Incident" | John Meredyth Lucas | Berne Giler | June 18, 1957 |
Men from the sheriff's office try to free a youth trapped in an abandoned oil derrick. The boy has been injured in the fall and the police work feverishly to save the boy's life.
| 13 | "The Water Skier" | Peter Godfrey | Jerry D. Lewis | June 25, 1957 |
A young man's hopes of making a success of his water skiing school are shattered when the boat is smashed.
| 14 | "Suspect Number One" | George Waggner | Lawrence Menkin | July 2, 1957 |
Sgt. Hollis (Fredd Wayne) and Sgt. Goodrich are assigned to investigate the murder of a man who was stabbed to death.
| 15 | "Junk Detail" | George Waggner | Lee Loeb | July 9, 1957 |
A sergeant and a deputy are assigned to investigate the illegal sale of government merchandise. They learn that an attractive woman and her brother-in-law are operating the racket.
| 16 | "An Ounce of Prevention" | Paul Landres | Paul Franklin | July 16, 1957 |
A successful broker is shocked when he learns that his son is involved in the wrecking of an empty house. Sgt. Coombs and Bob Nelson convince the fathers of the boys that the boys should rebuild the house.
| 17 | "The Trap" | Owen Crump | Paul Franklin | July 23, 1957 |
The vice detail assigns Sgt. Hollis (Fredd Wayne) and Sgt. Delacout to investigate a billiard parlor that fronts as a bookie joint.
| 18 | "The Thief" | George Waggner | Irving H. Cooper | July 30, 1957 |
A kleptomaniac is taking valuable jewelry from a department store.
| 19 | "Revolt On The Freeway" | George Waggner | Jack Laird | August 6, 1957 |
An eccentric old woman resents the new freeway extension being constructed in her neighborhood. She threatens the freeway construction crew and goes so far as to threaten the workmen with a gun.
| 20 | "Case 2206" | George Waggner | James O'Hanlon | August 13, 1957 |
The Los Angeles sheriff's office begins to suspect one of its deputies of being dishonest. The deputy requests night patrol and during his duty people complain of losing small sums of money. Captain Morse decides to investigate.
| 21 | "The Sniper" | George Waggner | Jerry D. Lewis | August 20, 1957 |
A woman suspects that her husband is the sniper who is terrorizing Los Angeles.
| 22 | "Family on Trial" | Owen Crump | Lawrence Menkin | August 27, 1957 |
A wealthy couple receive a threatening letter telling them their young son's life is in danger. They are ordered to collect a large sum of money and not inform the police.
| 23 | "The Nelson Case" | Ted Post | Jerry D. Lewis | September 3, 1957 |
An itinerant youth comes to a seaside church and tells the father that his employer has asked him to kill a woman. He begs the father for help.
| 24 | "The Hired Man" | Don Siegel | William P. Rousseau | September 10, 1957 |
A hysterical woman tells Lieutenant Sawyer and Sergeant Porter a fantastic story. A man has been hired to kill her husband.
| 25 | "The Ashes Will Whisper" | Paul Landres | Jack Bennett | September 17, 1957 |
The sheriff's office attempts to solve a series of baffling fires. Sections of a newspaper comic strip found at the scenes of several fires give the sheriff's office a clue to the mystery.
| 26 | "Charged Bottle" | Peter Godfrey | Jerry D. Lewis | September 24, 1957 |
A young schoolboy finds a box containing a radioactive explosive. He refuses to give it up when the police ask for its return.
| 27 | "You Can't Kill A Marine" | Paul Landres | Jack Laird | October 1, 1957 |
Police search for a psychopath who robbed and nearly killed a marine.
| 28 | "The Man With Many Names" | Peter Godfrey | Lee Loeb | October 8, 1957 |
Lt. Bill Hollis of the Forgery Detail is baffled by a clever forger, who eludes police by using many disguises, until a distinctive mannerism gives him away.
| 29 | "The Misery Chiselers" | George Waggner | Jerry D. Lewis | October 15, 1957 |
Posing as an official, Paul Wayne promises to expedite the emigration of people from oppressed European countries. For his services he charges a large fee - until one of his victims goes to the police.
| 30 | "Night of Terror" | George Waggner | Jerry D. Lewis | October 22, 1957 |
A deranged concert pianist escapes from a mental hospital and returns home to kill his brother-in-law.
| 31 | "The Harbor Incident" | Owen Crump | Paul Franklin | October 29, 1957 |
Zavala is convinced that an old derelict did not commit murder and robbery.
| 32 | "Bail Out" | Paul Landres | William P. Rousseau | November 5, 1957 |
An airport control tower receives a message from a plane in trouble and learns that the pilot has bailed out. Captain Dillon is sent to find the crashed plane and locate the survivor.
| 33 | "The Killer" | William Thiele | Lawrence Menkin | November 12, 1957 |
Police search for a compulsive killer attracted to aspiring young actresses.
| 34 | "Death In An Alley" | Paul Landres | Jack Laird | November 19, 1957 |
Sergeants Zavala and Gorman try to help an elderly man who has been struck down in a dark alley. Before he dies the man gasps out a one-word clue to his death: "Arkansas."
| 35 | "Lonesome Whistles" | George Waggner | Paul Franklin | November 26, 1957 |
A train nearing town is carrying enough explosives to blow the place to kingdom come.
| 36 | "999" | Peter Godfrey | Lawrence Menkin | December 3, 1957 |
A teen-age boy, goaded into shooting a rival gang leader, is given a gun and ordered to make the killing soon. But the boy gets into a violent quarrel and the police are called in.
| 37 | "The Search" | Paul Landres | William P. Rousseau | December 10, 1957 |
Police search for a lost child in almost impenetrable mountain terrain.
| 38 | "Sunset Strip" | George Waggner | Laurence Heath | December 17, 1957 |
The sheriff's office tries to help a once famous actor who now desperately needs a job.
| 39 | "The Benson Case" | Ted Post | M. Lee Perenchio and Violet Atkins | December 24, 1957 |
Bonnie Benson, an accused murderess, is brought to the Terminal Island Division of the Los Angeles County jail for detention prior to her trial. Bonnie's bitter attitude and hatred of the law officers is intensified when she discovers one of her cellmates is a "plant", put there to acquire incriminating statements

== Production ==
Hal Roach Jr. was the executive producer, and Ben Fox was the producer. Ted Post was the director, and Jerry D. Lewis was the writer.

== Reception ==
A review in the trade publication Variety complimented the show's suspense, drama, and characterization and noted the quality of camera work.
