= Broadside (TV series) =

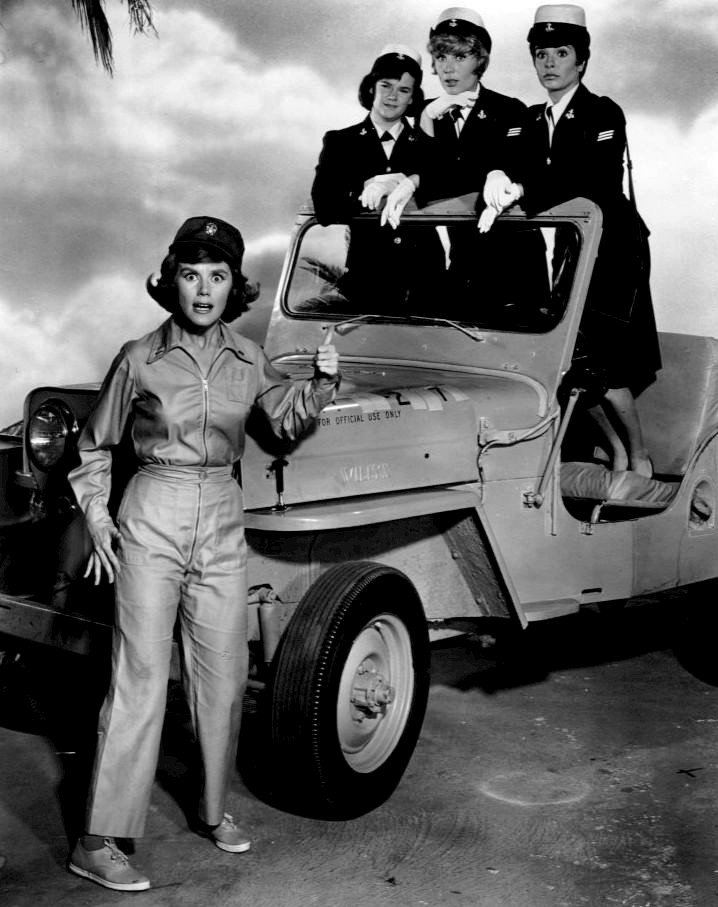
- Kathleen Nolan with Sheila James, Joan Staley and Lois Roberts, 1964.
- Genre: Military comedy
- Written by: Frank J. Gill, Jr. George Carleton Brown; Si Rose; Ray Brenner; Barry E. Blitzer; Benedict Freedman; Earl Barret; Robert C. Dennis; Jack Harvey; Bruce Howard; Bud Nye; Elroy Schwartz; Irving Taylor; Sam Locke; Joel Rapp; Stan Dreben; Howard Merrill; William Raynor; Myles Wilder
- Directed by: Frank McDonald; Sidney Miller; Edward Montagne; Hollingsworth Morse; Don Richardson; Jean Yarbrough; E.W. Swackhamer; Charles Barton
- Starring: Kathleen Nolan; Edward Andrews; Dick Sargent; Sheila James; Joan Staley; Lois Roberts; Jimmy Boyd; Don Edmonds; George Furth; Arnold Stang
- Composer: Jerry Fielding
- Country of origin: United States
- Original language: English
- No. of seasons: 1
- No. of episodes: 32

Production
- Producer: Edward Montagne
- Running time: 30 minutes
- Production company: Universal Television

Original release
- Network: ABC
- Release: September 20, 1964 – September 12, 1965

Broadside is an American sitcom that aired on ABC during the 1964–1965 TV season. The series, produced by McHale's Navy creator Edward Montagne, starred Kathleen Nolan, formerly of The Real McCoys. The program aired on Sunday nights at 8:30 p.m. Eastern time, between Voyage to the Bottom of the Sea and the Walter Brennan comedy The Tycoon.

== Synopsis ==
The series centered on the women of the Navy (WAVES) on "a supply base somewhere in the South Pacific, 1944," who found themselves transferred to the island of Ranakai to run the motorpool in an otherwise all-male environment. Lt. Anne Morgan (Kathleen Nolan) was in command of the man-crazy, wisecracking Selma Kowalski (Sheila James), the alternately chipper and worried Molly McGuire (Lois Roberts), the slow-witted blonde and former exotic dancer Roberta Love (Joan Staley), and the unit's only male recruit, Marion Botnik (Jimmy Boyd), assigned to the WAVES due to a clerical error.

Their nemesis was the rarefied Commander Roger Adrian (Edward Andrews), who regarded the war as a major intrusion on his idyllic, luxurious lifestyle; he felt that the WAVES experiment would attract official government supervision, endangering his private paradise. Adrian and his easily flustered junior officer Lt. Beasley (George Furth) constantly conspired to get rid of the WAVES, while executive officer Lt. Max Trotter (Dick Sargent) and streetwise sailor Nicky D'Angelo (Don Edmonds) sided with the girls in their counter-attacks on Adrian. Completing the ensemble was Adrian's fussy personal chef Bernard (Richard Jury).

== Production ==
Edward Andrews (as "Eddie Andrews") had appeared in producer Edward Montagne's military sitcom The Phil Silvers Show (Sergeant Bilko). Montagne remembered him and co-starred him in Broadside. "The amusing thing is that Ed Montagne first offered me the Captain Binghamton role in his McHale's Navy and I turned him down," said Andrews in 1965. "After seeing what a wonderful job Joe Flynn is doing with the role, I keep kicking myself for what was apparently a stupid decision. [Broadside] is roughly a distaff version of McHale's Navy. One reason I grabbed onto this series is that finally, I hope, I'll get an identity with exposure every week in the same role."

Broadside boasted clever scripts and good direction by the McHale's Navy staff, and enthusiastic performances by the ensemble cast. As it was a rule that vehicles on set could only be operated by union members, the cast playing drivers got honorary Teamsters’ cards.

The Broadside series was sponsored by Consolidated Cigar, makers of Dutch Masters and Muriel cigars. It was ABC's only fully sponsored show on Sunday evenings: "[The network] is wide open on Sunday nights except for the new distaff version of McHale's Navy, Broadside."

== Mid-season changes ==
Comic character actor George Furth, who had been under exclusive contract to the studio since 1962, quickly settled into his featured role as Edward Andrews's comic foil. The writers picked up on their teamwork, scripting several comic set pieces for them.

During this period, another example of fortunate casting presented itself. Edward Montagne had produced movie short subjects starring comedian Arnold Stang in the early 1950s. Montagne recruited Stang to join the series and offered him co-star billing. Stang was then co-starring with the national touring company of the Broadway hit A Funny Thing Happened on the Way to the Forum and left the show on October 3, 1964 to join Montagne. "I was originally scheduled to be in the show when it went on the air last fall," recalled Stang in 1965, "but I was tied up with the road show of A Funny Thing Happened on the Way to the Forum. I couldn't get out of the commitment until now." Stang appeared midway through the Broadside run, having missed the first 22 episodes, and he replaced both Richard Jury and Don Edmonds in the ensemble cast. He co-starred in the remaining 10 episodes as outspoken master chef Stanley Stubbs, reunited with his high-school classmate Selma of the WAVES motorpool.

The ratings improved considerably with Stang aboard, but too late to save the series, which had already been canceled. Stang felt responsible: "By helping that show I messed it up for the entire cast. The ratings began to climb and they told us we'd probably be on next season. So everybody waited for the renewal, and when it didn't come the pilot season was over and they were all through for the year." Arnold Stang did not appear in the last two episodes of the network run; ABC had pre-empted the show twice, and these shelved episodes with departed co-star Don Edmonds were burned off to finish the run.

== Cancellation ==
Studio space was then at a premium at Revue, Universal's TV division, with production at an all-time high: "Revue is lensing its many series not only on its own 410 acres, but at Paramount Sunset studios where additional space was rented because of the heavy production load. Every one of the company's 32 sound stages is busy, as are six backlot locations." The executives felt that the tropical exteriors being used by Broadside and McHale's Navy—and nothing else—were taking up too much space on the backlot. Broadside was canceled, and the setting for McHale's Navy was changed to Italy, which could be shot on the studio's more frequently used sets with European facades.

The first-run episodes ended on May 2, 1965, with reruns broadcast in the same time slot through September 12, 1965.

Broadside, with its relatively limited supply of 32 episodes, has seldom been seen in syndication, although Universal offered it to local stations shortly after its network run.

== Cast ==
- Kathleen Nolan as Lieutenant Anne Morgan
- Edward Andrews as Commander Roger Adrian
- Dick Sargent as Lieutenant Maxwell Trotter
- Jimmy Boyd as Marion Botnik
- Sheila James as Selma Kowalski
- Lois Roberts as Molly McGuire
- Joan Staley as Roberta Love
- Don Edmonds as Nicky D'Angelo
- George Furth as Lt. Beasley
- Arnold Stang as Seaman 1st Class Stanley Stubbs

== Episodes ==
This is a caption
No.	Title	Directed by	Written by	Original release date
1	"Don't Make Waves"	Edward Montagne	Story by : Si Rose; Teleplay by : Barry Blitzer & Ray Brenner and Frank Gill, Jr. & George Carleton Brown	September 20, 1964
A quartet of WAVES takes over the motorpool on the South Pacific island of Ranakai, with animosity developing immediately.
2	"The Non-Permanent Wave"	Earl Bellamy	William Raynor & Myles Wilder	September 27, 1964
Marion Botnik playfully snaps pictures of the girls violating Navy regulations, but Commander Adrian locks the pictures in a safe so the admiral can see them.
3	"Kill 'Em with Kindness"	Charles Barton	Sam Locke & Joel Rapp	October 4, 1964
Adrian offers the WAVES delicious, high-calorie foods so that they will be unable to pass the upcoming fitness test.
4	"Anne Shoots Down Cupid"	Earl Bellamy	Ralph Goodman & Stan Dreben	October 11, 1964
Dissension among the WAVES breaks out after each of them has dated a muscular sailor.
5	"Lt. Morgan's Secret Marriage"	Hollingsworth Morse	Ralph Goodman & Stan Dreben	October 25, 1964
Adrian's visiting nephew ends up causing more trouble for him than the WAVES.
6	"The Great Lipstick War"	E.W. Swackhamer	Ben Freeman	November 1, 1964
Adrian cuts off the WAVES' makeup supply in the hopes that they will leave, but Morgan quickly sets up a lipstick still.
7	"Adrian Gets Nipped"	Charles Barton	John Fenton Murray	November 8, 1964
Adrian and the crew pose as the enemy to frighten the WAVES into leaving the island.
8	"The Morale of Molly McGuire"	E.W. Swackhamer	William Raynor & Myles Wilder	November 15, 1964
Molly falls in love, so Adrian schedules a psychological test for her in the hopes that the entire motorpool will be shipped stateside.
9	"Adrian's Anniversary Waltz"	Unknown	Unknown	November 22, 1964
Someone is making off with gourmet food from Adrian's private supply.
10	"Anne Bugs the Enemy"	Charles Barton	Frank Gill, Jr. & George Carleton Brown	November 29, 1964
Adrian sabotages the motorpool to get them flagged for inefficiency. Anne fights back by planting a tape recorder in the commander's headquarters in the hope that he will make a damaging admission.
11	"Ranakai Flips Its Wig"	Charles Barton	Bruce Howard & Bud Nye	December 6, 1964
The WAVES are tricked by Adrian into thinking that they are victim of a rare tropical disease known as "galloping baldness".
12	"My Son, the Egg"	Charles Barton	Sam Locke & Joel Rapp	December 13, 1964
Adrian gets the mistaken idea that one of the WAVES is pregnant.
13	"Selma, the Love Trap"	Hollingsworth Morse	Sam Locke & Joel Rapp	December 20, 1964
Rough-and-ready Selma is too forthright to snare a boyfriend, so the WAVES coach her to be more demure. When Selma goes AWOL, Anne has to cover for her.
14	"The Obstacle Course"	Frank McDonald	Sam Locke & Joel Rapp	December 27, 1964
The WAVES compete against three trained Marines in running a jungle obstacle course, and end up using their ingenuity to come out ahead.
15	"Behind the Eight Ball"	Don Richardson	Elroy Schwartz	January 3, 1965
After undergoing involuntary hypnosis, Adrian's attitude toward the WAVES swings wildly between love and hate.
16	"The Stowawaves"	Hollingsworth Morse	William Raynor & Myles Wilder	January 10, 1965
The WAVES stow away on a cargo ship and are shocked to see that Adrian is aboard.
17	"The Wolfman Cometh"	Frank McDonald	Frank Fox and Bruce Howard & Bud Nye	January 17, 1965
A war correspondent uses the power of the press to wangle a date with Anne.
18	"Taurus to Aries to Chance"	Hollingsworth Morse	Jack Harvey & Irving Taylor	January 24, 1965
After Roberta destroys Adrian's croquet court while trying to warn him about ominous astrological signs, the other WAVES have to make Adrian believe in astrology to avoid having Roberta court-martialed.
19	"Adrian Goes Gung-Ho"	Bruce Humberstone	Bruce Howard & Bud Nye	January 31, 1965
While Anne is on leave, Adrian uses sleep-teaching records to try to get the WAVES to leave. After Anne returns, she tries the same thing on him and plants the idea that he should volunteer for dangerous duty.
20	"The Arrival of Stanley Stubbs"	Hollingsworth Morse	Elroy Schwartz	February 7, 1965
World-famous chef Stanley Stubbs (Arnold Stang) comes to Ranakai after Adrian begs to have him assigned there.
21	"Follow That Pigeon"	Hollingsworth Morse	Bruce Howard & Bud Nye	February 14, 1965
After spotting coded messages being sent by carrier pigeon, Adrian becomes convinced that the WAVES are guilty of espionage.
22	"Three Little Wishes"	Sidney Miller	Bruce Howard & Bud Nye	February 21, 1965
Adrian acquires a monkey's paw that is supposed to give the owner magical wishing powers. However, he is unaware that a curse is applied if an evil wish is made.
23	"Lieutenant Love, Sir"	Sidney Miller	Stan Dreben & Ralph Goodman	February 28, 1965
After calling a Navy hearing to charge the WAVES with inefficiency, Adrian then has them arrested by Brisbane police so they will not be present to defend themselves.
24	"Adrian's Phantom Staff Car"	Jean Yarbrough	Robert C. Dennis & Earl Barret	March 7, 1965
Stanley and Selma allow Adrian's Rolls-Royce staff car to roll off a cliff and into a tree. They have to scramble to limit the consequences.
25	"Adrian Gets the Boot"	Jean Yarbrough	Jack Harvey & Iving Taylor	March 14, 1965
Adrian orders the WAVES to undergo boot-camp training while continuing with their motorpool duties. The WAVES fight back, faking an order for Adrian to take basic training as well.
26	"Filet on the Hoof"	Jean Yarbrough	Elroy Schwartz	March 21, 1965
Adrian smuggles a steer onto the island. After he discovers that Anne is allergic to animal hair, he assigns her to fatten up the steer.
27	"The Great Ranakai Mutiny"	Hollingsworth Morse	Robert C. Dennis & Earl Barret	March 28, 1965
When the WAVES convince Adrian that he's headed for a nervous breakdown, Ensign Beasley eagerly takes command of the base.
28	"Ann Morgan's Home Movies"	Hollingsworth Morse	Story by : Stan Dreben & Howard Merrill; Teleplay by : Bruce Howard	April 4, 1965
Adrian has movies of the WAVES taken during an unguarded moment so he can use them as evidence that they are neglecting their duties.
29	"Witchcraft a Go-Go"	Hollingsworth Morse	Elroy Schwartz	April 11, 1965
Roberta develops extrasensory perception, which causes Adrian to use him to contact his wife, an 18th-century Hawaiian king, Napoleon's cook, and a Chinese emperor who reigned in 6 AD.
30	"Once Upon an Island"	Frank McDonald	Bruce Howard & Bud Nye	April 18, 1965
During the flight to Brisbane for the WAVES' court martial, the airplane door inadvertently opens, which causes Adrian, the WAVES, Ensign Beasley, and Lt. Trotter to sail out over the South Pacific. (Originally, this was supposed to be the last show of the series, but two shelved first-run episodes were broadcast later.)
31	"Miss Ranakai"	Jean Yarbrough	William Raynor & Myles Wilder	April 25, 1965
Adrian stages a beauty contest to create jealousy among the WAVES. (This was filmed earlier in the season, but pre-empted; Don Edmonds appears instead of Arnold Stang.)
32	"Operation Clip-Joint"	Charles Barton	Ray Brenner & Barry Blitzer	May 2, 1965
When Molly needs money for her nephew's operation, Adrian suggests a fund-raising party. He then arranges to raid the party in the company of Admiral Bradford. (Filmed earlier in the season, this had been pre-empted; Don Edmonds appears instead of Arnold Stang.)
