= Cheerio Meredith =

American actress (1890–1964)

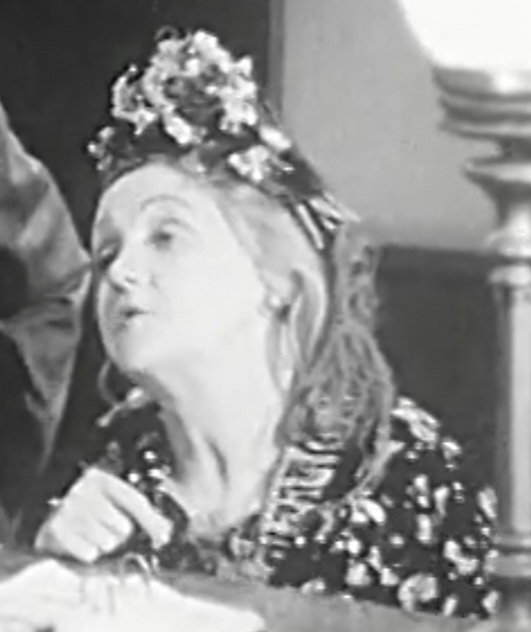
- Meredith in A Fig Leaf for Eve (1944)
- Born: Edwina Lucille Hoffmann; July 12, 1890; Missouri, U.S.
- Died: December 25, 1964 (aged 74); Woodland Hills, Los Angeles, California, U.S.
- Resting place: Forest Lawn Memorial Park Hollywood Hills
- Occupation: Actress
- Years active: 1944–1964
- Spouses: Conde Thompson Mosley (m. 1910; died 1949): Chester Morrison
- Children: 4

Cheerio Meredith (born Edwina Lucille Hoffmann; July 12, 1890 – December 25, 1964) was an American character actress. She was described in a 1963 newspaper article as having "a face like a wrinkled rosebud."

== Early life ==
Meredith was born in 1890; her mother was an elocutionist in the Chautauqua movement, and one of her grandmothers was an evangelist. Meredith made her own debut on stage with a monologue at age 3. The name Cheerio resulted from her cheerful attitude as a child.

As a teenager, Meredith sought to play older characters. At age 15, she asked a producer to give her the part of an old woman, and he made her a witch in the play.

== Film and television ==
Films in which Meredith appeared included Brand of Courage (1958), The Long Count (1962), The Fat Man (1951), I'll Cry Tomorrow (1955), I Married a Woman (1958), The Legend of Tom Dooley (1958), The Three Stooges in Orbit (1962), The Wonderful World of the Brothers Grimm (1962) and Sex and the Single Girl (1964).

On television, Meredith portrayed Lovey Hackett on One Happy Family (1961). She also was seen regularly on The Ames Brothers Show (1955) and had the role of Emma Brand (later Emma Watson) on The Andy Griffith Show. Mary Lou Gedman wrote about Meredith's role on the Griffith show, "During her two-year stint on the show, she only appeared in six episodes but somehow, to the American people, she made a lasting impression." She also had roles in other programs such as Petticoat Junction, December Bride, The Dick Van Dyke Show, The Tom Ewell Show, McHale's Navy, Perry Mason and Bonanza.

== Personal life and death ==
Meredith was twice married and had four children, three of whom acted on Broadway before going into other careers. The fourth became a producer of plays.

In December 1964, "after a long illness", Meredith died at the Motion Picture Country House and Hospital in Woodland Hills, California. She was 74 years old. Meredith was buried at Forest Lawn Memorial Park Hollywood Hills, Los Angeles County, California.
