= Jack Kirkwood =

Scottish-American actor, comedian and vaudevillian

- Born: August 6, 1894; Scotland
- Died: August 2, 1964 (aged 69); Las Vegas, Nevada, U.S.
- Occupations: Actor, comedian and vaudevillian
- Spouse: Phyllis Kirkwood
- Children: 2

Jack Kirkwood (August 6, 1894 – August 2, 1964) was a Scottish-American actor, comedian and vaudevillian. He was known for playing Charley Hackett in the American sitcom television series One Happy Family.

Kirkwood was born in Scotland. He began his career in vaudeville before appearing on radio in the 1930s, presenting KFRC's radio program Breakfast Club. He also starred in his own radio show titled The Jack Kirkwood Show. In 1950, he starred in the film Fancy Pants, playing Mike Floud. His last television credit was in the NBC sitcom television series One Happy Family.

Kirkwood died on August 2, 1964 of a heart attack at his home in Las Vegas, Nevada, at the age of 69. He was buried at Palm Downtown Cemetery.
