= Torie Osborn =

Community organizer, activist, and author

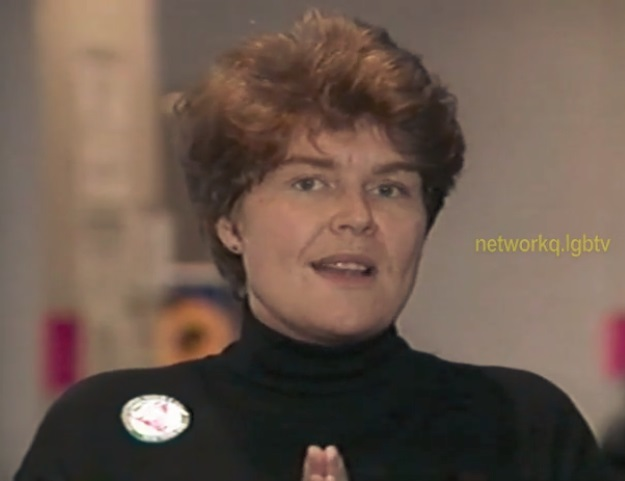
Torie Osborn at the 1993 National Gay and Lesbian Task Force's Creating Change Conference.

Torie Osborn (born July 27, 1950) is a community organizer, activist, and author.

== Education ==
Osborn attended Barnard College, received her Bachelor of Arts degree in English from Middlebury College and earned her MBA at the UCLA Anderson School of Management, specializing in finance.

== Activism ==
Osborn was involved with Planned Parenthood as a teenager. Her work in activism began while she was a student at Barnard College, where she participated in sit-ins, protest marches and teach-ins. In Vermont while attending Middlebury College, Osborn founded the Middlebury College Women's Union to reform women's health services on campus. In 1978 Osborn moved to San Francisco and organized against the Briggs initiative banning gay and lesbian teachers from public schools. While working for Los Angeles Mayor Antonio Villaraigosa, she worked on solutions for homelessness, and supportive housing.

== Career ==
In 1976, after teaching in community college in upstate New York, Osborn moved to Chicago to join the founding staff of In These Times. In 1981, after moving to San Francisco, Osborn served as Northern California Director for the National Organization for Women (NOW). From 1988 to 1992, at the height of the AIDS epidemic in Los Angeles, she became the first woman executive director of the Los Angeles Gay and Lesbian Center. Osborn then served as executive director of the National Gay and Lesbian Task Force in Washington, D.C., the nation's oldest gay and lesbian civil rights organization. From 1997 through 2005, Osborn was the executive director of the Liberty Hill Foundation, a Los Angeles-based non-profit dedicated to environmental justice.

Osborn served as senior advisor to Los Angeles Mayor Antonio Villaraigosa, working to reduce homelessness and poverty, resulting two years later in the formation of the City of L.A. Office of Strategic Partnerships, a national public-private collaboration, connecting non-profit and governmental agencies with philanthropic organizations. Osborn also served as Chief Civic Engagement Officer for the United Way of Greater Los Angeles in 2009, and is currently Senior Strategist for California Calls, a network of 27 organizations throughout California committed to "common-sense" government reform including fair tax and budget policy.

== Politics ==
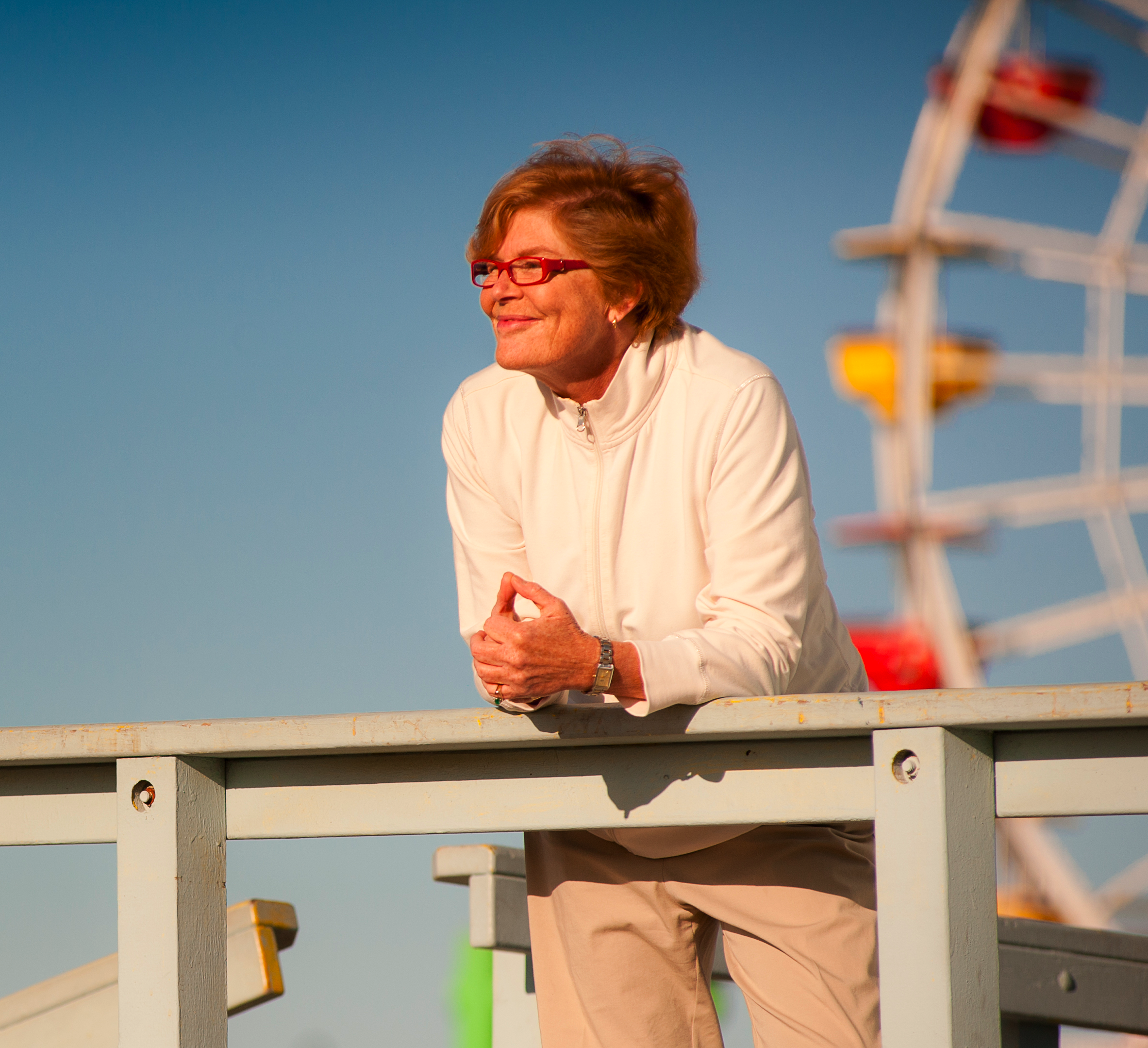
Osborn at the Santa Monica Pier.

In 2008, Osborn took a leave of absence from her post in Villaraigosa's office, moving to Nevada to serve as a "Super Volunteer" for Barack Obama's 2008 presidential campaign.

In 2012, she ran as a Democratic candidate for California's 50th State Assembly district, placing third of four candidates.

== Publications ==
- Coming Home to America (1997 St. Martin's Griffin; ISBN 0-312-16804-7)

== See also ==
- Los Angeles Gay and Lesbian Center
- National Gay and Lesbian Task Force
- Liberty Hill Foundation
