= Dick Sargent =

American actor (1930–1994)

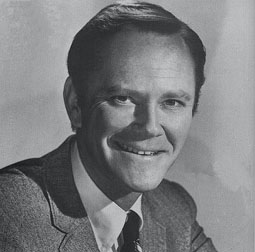
- Born: Richard Stanford Cox; April 19, 1930; Carmel-by-the-Sea, California, U.S.
- Died: July 8, 1994 (aged 64); Los Angeles, California
- Other name: Richard Sargent
- Occupation: Actor
- Years active: 1954–1994
- Partner: Albert Williams (1986–1994)

Richard Stanford Cox (April 19, 1930 – July 8, 1994), known professionally as Dick Sargent, was an American actor. He is best known for being the second actor to portray Darrin Stephens on ABC's fantasy sitcom Bewitched. He took the name Dick Sargent from a Saturday Evening Post illustrator/artist of the same name.

== Early life ==
Sargent was born Richard Stanford Cox in Carmel-by-the-Sea, California, on April 19, 1930, to Ruth McNaughton and Colonel Elmer Cox. His mother was the daughter of John McNaughton, who founded Los Angeles's famed Union Stockyards. She appeared under the stage name of "Ruth Powell", and had supporting bit roles in such films as The Four Horsemen of the Apocalypse and Hearts and Trumps with Alla Nazimova. Sargent's father Elmer served in World War I and later became a business manager to Hollywood figures, including Douglas Fairbanks and Erich von Stroheim.

Sargent attended the San Rafael Military Academy in San Rafael, California, before majoring in drama at Stanford University. He appeared in two dozen plays with the Stanford Players Theater.

== Career ==
Sargent appeared in feature films following his debut in Prisoner of War (1954). He appeared in The Great Locomotive Chase (1956) starring Fess Parker. In the 1957 movie Bernardine, Sargent portrayed Sanford "Fofo" Wilson.

Sargent appeared in the 1959 feature film Operation Petticoat starring Cary Grant, and The Ghost and Mr. Chicken starring Don Knotts in 1966. He was a regular in three short-lived television comedies, One Happy Family in 1961, Broadside in 1964, and The Tammy Grimes Show, a four-episode ABC flop in 1966. For three seasons, from 1969 to 1972, he played Darrin Stephens – a role he had previously turned down — in Bewitched, replacing ailing actor Dick York.

In 1975, Sargent appeared on the game show Tattletales with Fannie Flagg.

His later movies included the crime drama Hardcore (1979) as Jake Van Dorn (George C. Scott)'s strait-laced brother-in-law, Wes DeJong, and as Dr. Jameson in the sci-fi horror film Parts: The Clonus Horror (1979). He also played Sheriff Grady Byrd in two 1979–1980 season episodes of The Dukes of Hazzard.

Sargent continued to work in film. He played Harry in Live a Little, Love a Little (1968) opposite Elvis Presley and Michele Carey, and made guest appearances on television series, including Navy Log; The West Point Story; Medic; Code 3; Ripcord; Gunsmoke; Wagon Train; The Alaskans; The Adventures of Ozzie and Harriet; The Rat Patrol; I Dream of Jeannie; Hazel; Dr. Kildare; Daniel Boone; Kraft Mystery Theater; Three's Company; The Waltons; Charlie's Angels; Knots Landing; Family Ties; The Love Boat; Fantasy Island; Adam-12; The Streets of San Francisco; Owen Marshall: Counselor at Law; Ellery Queen; The Tony Randall Show; The Devlin Connection; Baretta; Switch; The Six Million Dollar Man; Marcus Welby, M.D.; Trapper John, M.D.; Matt Houston; Alice; Taxi; Benson; Vega$; Diff'rent Strokes; Here's Lucy; Love, American Style; The Yellow Rose; The Commish; Finder of Lost Loves; Murder, She Wrote; L.A. Law; and Harry and the Hendersons. In 1990, he also portrayed himself in an episode of Columbo. In the mid-1980s he landed the steady role of Richard Preston, the widowed father, in the TBS sitcom Down to Earth. He also appeared in the fantasy comedy Teen Witch (1989).

Throughout the 1980s, he joined actress Sally Struthers as an advocate for Christian Children's Fund, which brought relief to children in developing nations. Sargent also did charitable work for the Special Olympics, World Hunger, AIDS Project Los Angeles and the American Foundation for AIDS Research.

== Personal life ==
On National Coming Out Day in 1991, Sargent publicly came out as gay and declared his support for gay rights. The high rate of suicide among young gay people was the main reason; he jokingly referred to himself as a "retroactive role model". Sargent recognized that his ill health from prostate cancer may have led people to assume that he suffered from AIDS.

Sargent had a companion, with whom he lived for over 20 years, before the unidentified man died of a cerebral hemorrhage in 1979. He later lived with his domestic partner Albert Williams until his death.

In June 1992, Sargent was a Grand Marshal of the Los Angeles Gay Pride parade along with Elizabeth Montgomery.

== Death ==
Sargent was diagnosed with prostate cancer in 1989. Doctors were initially optimistic that it could be treated. However, the disease continued to spread and, by early 1994, he had become seriously ill. Sargent died from the disease on July 8, 1994, aged 64. His body was cremated.

Former Bewitched co-star Elizabeth Montgomery commented, "He was a great friend, and I will miss his love, his sense of humor and his remarkable courage." Montgomery herself died of colon cancer less than a year later.

== Filmography ==
=== Film ===
Year	Title	Role	Notes
1954	Prisoner of War	Lt. Leonard Lee	Uncredited
1955	The Beast with a Million Eyes	Deputy Larry Brewster	
1956	The Great Locomotive Chase	Andrews Raider	Uncredited
1956	Love Me Tender	Confederate Soldier	Uncredited
1957	Bernardine	Sanford Wilson	
1958	Mardi Gras	Dick Saglon	
1959	Operation Petticoat	Ensign Stovall	as Richard Sargent
1960	The Great Impostor	Hotchkiss	
1962	That Touch of Mink	Harry Clark	
1963	For Love or Money	Harvey Wofford	
1963	Captain Newman, M.D.	Lt. Belden "Barney" Alderson	
1965	Fluffy	Tommy	
1965	Billie	Matt Bullitt	
1966	The Ghost and Mr. Chicken	George Beckett	
1968	The Private Navy of Sgt. O'Farrell	Captain Elwood Prohaska	
1968	The Young Runaways	Freddie	
1968	Live a Little, Love a Little	Harry	
1979	Hardcore	Wes DeJong	
1979	Parts: The Clonus Horror	Dr. Jameson	
1983	I'm Going to Be Famous	The Director	
1986	The Eleventh Commandment	Charles Knight	
1989	Teen Witch	Frank Miller	
1989	Murder by Numbers	Patrick Crain	
1989	Rock-A-Die Baby	Adam	
1990	Twenty Dollar Star	Mr. Brandon	
1991	Frame Up	Will Curran	
1993	Acting on Impulse	Mr. Randolph	

=== Television ===
Year	Title	Role	Notes
1954	I Married Joan	Party Attendee	Episode: "Bev's Mistaken Marriage"
1956	Medic	Clyde	Episode: "The Glorious Red Gallagher"
1957	West Point	Cadet Daniels/Cadet Mike Mullen	2 episodes
1957	The Christophers	Michael Phillips	Episode: "Gentle Warrior"
1957	Navy Log	Seaman	Episode: "Ito of Attu"
1957	Code 3	George Pringle	Episode: "The Guilty Ones"
1958	Playhouse 90	Michael	Episode: "The Male Animal"
1959	Black Saddle	Lt. Herndon	Episode: "The Freebooters"
1959	The Loretta Young Show	Billy Simpson	Episode: "Ten Men and a Girl"
1960	Wichita Town	Scotty	Episode: "Afternoon in Town"
1960	The Alaskans	Joey	Episode: "The Seal Skin-Game"
1960	The Millionaire	Dixon Cooper	Episode: "Millionaire Dixon Cooper"
1961	One Happy Family	Dick Cooper	15 episodes
1961	Death Valley Days	Cliff Streeter	Episode: "Gamble with Death"
1961	Dr. Kildare	Dr. Paul Willis	Episode: "Holiday Weekend"
1962	Follow the Sun	Lt. Collins	Episode: "Sergeant Kolchak Fades Away"
1962	Gunsmoke	Bud	Episode: "Catawomper"
1962	Kraft Mystery Theatre	Dick Sprague	Episode: "Change of Heart"
1962	The Alfred Hitchcock Hour	Dave Fulton	Episode: "Don't Look Behind You"
1962	The Adventures of Ozzie and Harriet	George	Episode: "An Old Friend of June's"
1962	Alcoa Premiere	Haines	Episode: "The Potentate"
1963–1964	Wagon Train	Tom Reade/Andrew Elliott	2 episodes
1963	Hazel	Pete	Episode: "Mr. Griffin Throws a Wedding"
1963	Ripcord	Frank Webb	Episode: "Picture of Terror"
1964–1965	Broadside	Lt. Maxwell Trotter	32 episodes
1966–1967	Daniel Boone	Reuben Stone/Andrew Cooper	2 episodes
1966	Bob Hope Presents the Chrysler Theatre	Dick O'Hara	Episode: "Brilliant Benjamin Boggs"
1966	The Tammy Grimes Show	Terence Ward	6 episodes
1967	Accidental Family	Ted	Episode: "The Secret Life of Jerry Webster"
1968	The Rat Patrol	Lt. Kemper	Episode: "The Boomerang Raid"
1969	I Dream of Jeannie	Norman Cashman	Episode: "Jeannie for the Defense"
1969	Adam-12	Sidney Roemer	Episode: "Log 92: Tell Him He Pushed Back a Little Too Hard"
1969	The Outcasts	Reese Hawley	Episode: "Give Me Tomorrow"
1969–1972	Bewitched	Darrin Stephens	84 episodes
1970–1973	Love, American Style	Ben Cortnoy/Freddy/Peter Bradley/Bill	4 episodes
1972–1974	Owen Marshall, Counselor at Law	Neil Vickery/Edgar Hogan	2 episodes
1972	Young Dr. Kildare	Sam Barlow	Episode: "The Stranger"
1973	The Streets of San Francisco	Boyd Caldwell	Episode: "Shattered Image"
1973	Here's Lucy	Officer Spencer	Episode: "Lucy Plays Cops and Robbers"
1974	Melvin Purvis: G-Man	Thatcher Covington	Television movie
1974	Fools, Females and Fun	Roger Morris	Television movie
1976	McMillan & Wife	Dr. Jim Vale	Episode: "The Deadly Curse"
1976	Ellery Queen	Tom Calabrese	Episode: "The Adventure of the Wary Witness"
1976	Marcus Welby, M.D.	Pete Randall	2 episodes
1976	Rich Man, Poor Man	Eddie Heath	Miniseries; 2 episodes
1976	The Six Million Dollar Man	Bob Crandall	Episode: "A Bionic Christmas Carol"
1976–1977	Rich Man, Poor Man Book II	Eddie Heath	Miniseries; 3 episodes
1976–1979	Charlie's Angels	Hugh Morris/Marty Cole/Avery	3 episodes
1977–1982	Fantasy Island	Charles Hollander/Algernon Pepperhill/Justin Rothwell	3 episodes
1977	The Tony Randall Show	Chelsey Howard	Episode: "Case: The Lawndale Report"
1977	Three's Company	Lloyd Cross	Episode: "Chrissy's Date"
1977	Baretta	Gil Martin	Episode: "Lyman P. Dokker, Fed"
1977	The Love Boat	Father Mike	Episode: "Lonely at the Top/Silent Night/Divorce Me, Please"
1978	Switch	Bill Gambel	Episode: "Formula for Murder"
1979	The Power Within	Captain Ed Holman	Television movie
1979	Not Until Today	Father Francis Daley	Television movie
1980	Vegas	Farley/Phil King	2 episodes
1980	The Dukes of Hazzard	Sheriff Grady Byrd	2 episodes
1980	The Gossip Columnist	Alan Keyes	Television movie
1980	The Waltons	Chief Petty Officer	2 episodes
1981	Aloha Paradise	Jim	Episode: "Make Me a Match/Treasure Hunt/The Kid Who Would Be a Daddy"
1981	Trapper John, M.D.	Dr. Philip Montague	Episode: "Hate is Enough"
1982	Taxi	John Bickers	Episode: "Jim's Inheritance"
1982	Family Ties	Charlie	Episode: "No Nukes is Good Nukes"
1982	The Devlin Connection	Robert Hutton	Episode: "Jennifer"
1982	This is the Life	Reverend Burwick	Episode: "The Visitation"
1983	Matt Houston	Binky Bradworth	Episode: "The Yacht Club Murders"
1983	The Yellow Rose	Judge Sam Claymore	2 episodes
1983	ABC Afterschool Special	Lew Shorr	Episode: "The Celebrity and the Arcade Kid"
1984	Alice	Dr. Crystal	Episode: "Jolene is Stuck on Mel"
1984	Benson	Worth Lakewood	2 episodes
1984	Finder of Lost Loves	Dennis Hodges	Episode: "White Lies"
1984	Diff'rent Strokes	Mr. Stone	2 episodes
1984–1987	Down to Earth	Richard Preston	93 episodes
1985	Knots Landing	Himself	Episode: "Weighing of Evils"
1987	Murder, She Wrote	George Selby	Episode: "Simon Says, Color Me Dead"
1988	L.A. Law	Edmund Bates	Episode: "Leapin' Lizards"
1988	Square One Television	Wellworth Watching	2 episodes
1990	Columbo	Himself	Episode: "Uneasy Lies the Crown"
1991	P.S. I Luv U	Sam	Episode: "I'd Kill to Direct"
1992	The Commish	Martin Belzer	Episode: "Sex, Lies and Kreosene"
1992	Harry and the Hendersons	Earl Powers	Episode: "Selling Out"
