= List of Dr. Kildare episodes =

American medical drama episodes

List of episodes for the American medical drama Dr. Kildare, which ran from 1961 to 1966 on NBC.

== Series overview ==
Season	Episodes	Originally released	
Season	Episodes	First released	Last released
1	33	September 28, 1961	May 24, 1962
2	34	September 27, 1962	June 6, 1963
3	34	September 26, 1963	May 21, 1964
4	32	September 24, 1964	May 13, 1965
5	58	September 13, 1965	April 5, 1966

== Episodes ==
=== Season 1 (1961–62) ===
No. overall	No. in season	Title	Directed by	Written by	Original release date	Prod. code
1	1	"Twenty-Four Hours"	Boris Sagal	E. Jack Neuman	September 28, 1961	6501
Dr. Kildare's bid to study under Dr. Gillespie hinges on his treatment of an alcoholic.
2	2	"Immunity"	Boris Sagal	Andy Lewis	October 5, 1961	6510
Kildare combs the city to pinpoint the origin of a smallpox case and thereby block its spread.
3	3	"Shining Image"	Buzz Kulik	John T. Kelley	October 12, 1961	6511
Kildare must tell a young woman (Suzanne Pleshette) that she has an incurable disease and has only two weeks to live.
4	4	"Winter Harvest"	Lamont Johnson	John Furia Jr.	October 19, 1961	6506
An aging surgeon (Charles Bickford) rejects demands that he retire so that he can conduct a critical operation on his friend.
5	5	"A Million Dollar Property"	Herbert Hirschman	Ernest Kinoy	October 26, 1961	6508
Kildare attempts to treat a starlet (Anne Francis) despite the constant interruptions of her entourage.
6	6	"Admitting Service"	Elliot Silverstein	E. Jack Neuman	November 2, 1961	6504
Kildare clashes with Gillespie over malpractice charges brought against Kildare's immediate superior (William Shatner).
7	7	"The Lonely Ones"	John Brahm	Story by : John Kneubuhl; Teleplay by : Archie L. Tegland	November 9, 1961	6509
Kildare learns that the intended bride of his boyhood friend (Dick York) desperately needs medical help.
8	8	"Holiday Weekend"	Gerald Mayer	Alvin Boretz	November 16, 1961	6517
Kildare discovers that among a group of auto accident victims is one of his fellow interns (Dick Sargent).
9	9	"The Patient"	Elliot Silverstein	Archie L. Tegland	November 23, 1961	6516
Chamberlain becomes a patient at the hospital and quickly learns about medicine from a different perspective.
10	10	"For the Living"	Elliot Silverstein	Story by : Jerome Ross; Teleplay by : John T. Kelley & John Dunkel	November 30, 1961	6514
Kildare and Gillespie try to make a devoted wife (Beatrice Straight) realize that her husband's coma may be of an indefinite nature.
11	11	"Second Chance"	Buzz Kulik	Story by : Jan Winters & Eve Ettinger; Teleplay by : John Vlahos and Jan Winters & Eve Ettinger	December 7, 1961	6503
Kildare is assigned a case in which an intern (Ross Martin) suffers paralysis that results in a deep emotional conflict.
12	12	"Hit and Run"	Alexander Singer	Story by : Norman Katkov; Teleplay by : Louis Peterson & Norman Katkov	December 14, 1961	6507
A grief-stricken father (Richard Kiley) threatens to kill if Gillespie and Kildare perform surgery that's been approved in court.
13	13	"Season to Be Jolly"	Elliot Silverstein	Jean Holloway	December 21, 1961	6513
Kildare and Gillespie have to deal with an alcoholic department store Santa Claus (Dan O'Herlihy) who's both unhappy and despondent.
14	14	"Johnny Temple"	Ralph Senensky	Story by : David P. Harmon; Teleplay by : Archie L. Tegland & David P. Harmon	December 28, 1961	
Kildare is treating a teenage boy for wounds suffered in a knife fight when the boy pulls a knife on him.
15	15	"My Brother, the Doctor"	Boris Sagal	Story by : Bruce Geller; Teleplay by : Bruce Geller & Archie L. Tegland	January 4, 1962	6520
Kildare becomes embroiled in a conflict between an intern (Eddie Ryder) and the intern's older brother (Herschel Bernardi).
16	16	"The Administrator"	Paul Stanley	Andy Lewis	January 11, 1962	6521
A hospital administrator (Joseph Cotten) who's known for his efficiency sees his career put in jeopardy by the neurotic behavior of his wife (Dorothy Malone).
17	17	"Oh, My Daughter"	Buzz Kulik	Betty Andrews	January 25, 1962	6528
When Gillespie's daughter Evelyn (Dina Merrill) finds out she's pregnant, she begs Kildare to allow her to commit suicide.
18	18	"The Search"	Buzz Kulik	John Furia Jr.	February 1, 1962	6525
An outbreak of food poisoning helps a disgruntled doctor (Jeremy Slate) decide between continued hospital work or a career in public health.
19	19	"The Glory Hunter"	Lamont Johnson	Story by : Gerry Day; Teleplay by : John T. Kelley & Gerry Day	February 8, 1962	6527
When Dr. Stewart (Alfred Ryder) arrives from India in order to raise funds for a hospital, a skeptical reporter tries to prove that he's a fraud.
20	20	"The Dragon"	Robert Ellis Miller	Andy Lewis	February 15, 1962	6530
In an effort to help her intern boyfriend (Scott Marlowe) avoid being cited for a serious medical error, a nurse (Margaret O'Brien) tries to romance Kildare so that he'll take the blame.
21	21	"The Stepping Stone"	Elliot Silverstein	Story by : Janet L. Tegland; Teleplay by : Archie L. Tegland	February 22, 1962	6533
Kildare and Gillespie try to help a poor, sick man (Joseph Schildkraut) regain his stature in the world of medical research.
22	22	"The Bronc-Buster"	Paul Stanley	Pat Fielder	March 1, 1962	6532
Kildare tries to convince a distant relative (Arch Johnson) to quit the rodeo for the sake of the youngsters who are dependent upon him.
23	23	"The Witch Doctor"	Lamont Johnson	Alvin Boretz	March 8, 1962	
Kildare and Gillespie desperately try to prevent a critically ill woman (Joan Hackett) from becoming the patient of a quack doctor (Pat Hingle).
24	24	"The Roaring Boy-O"	Elliot Silverstein	Story by : Emmet Lavery; Teleplay by : John Whedon	March 15, 1962	6526
An Irish poet (Dan O'Herlihy) who's known for his hard-drinking lifestyle, tries to escape from the hospital.
25	25	"Solomon's Choice"	Lamont Johnson	Story by : Anthony Lawrence; Teleplay by : John Furia Jr & Anthony Lawrence	March 29, 1962	6537
Kildare tries to find one solution for two women, one who loses her baby (Barbara Baxley) and one who doesn't want her newborn (Collin Wilcox).
26	26	"A Very Present Help"	Robert Butler	John T. Dugan	April 5, 1962	6506
Kildare is forced to compete with a nun (Glynis Johns) in a battle between medicine and religion in order to save a young housewife (Pat Crowley).
27	27	"One for the Road"	John Brahm	Story by : Yale Peter Harrison; Teleplay by : Robert Dozier	April 12, 1962	6535
Kildare is assigned to work in an experimental ward that's treating alcoholics under the direction of a doctor (Lee Marvin) who has his own ongoing battle with the bottle.
28	28	"The Horn of Plenty"	Paul Wendkos	James Blumgarten	April 19, 1962	6541
A young heiress tries to tempt Kildare with a future of luxury as a wealthy physician.
29	29	"The Chemistry of Anger"	William Graham	Story by : Marshall Goldberg; Teleplay by : Jerry McNeely	April 26, 1962	6545
Growing hostility between Kildare and a tyrannical doctor (Rip Torn) is suddenly interrupted by an emergency case that forces them to work together.
30	30	"Something of Importance"	Elliot Silverstein	Sy Salkowitz	May 3, 1962	6544
Kildare and a research doctor (George Voskovec) are in a race against a rival team to discover a cure for a fatal blood disease.
31	31	"A Distant Thunder"	Paul Wendkos	Gene Roddenberry	May 10, 1962	6539
Kildare is assigned to watch over a former general (Dean Jagger) who is displaying suicidal tendencies.
32	32	"The Road to the Heart"	Elliot Silverstein	Story by : Theodore & Mathilde Ferro; Teleplay by : Jean Holloway	May 17, 1962	6534
Kildare risks his career as he attempts to convince a mother (Joanne Linville) that surgery will be able to help her deaf son (Rory O'Brien).
33	33	"Operation: Lazarus"	Boris Sagal	Betty Andrews	May 24, 1962	6546
A former doctor (Sidney Blackmer) is operated on by Kildare in an attempt to restore his sanity.

=== Season 2 (1962–63) ===
No. overall	No. in season	Title	Directed by	Written by	Original release date	Prod. code
34	1	"Gravida One"	Elliot Silverstein	E. Jack Neuman	September 27, 1962	6518
Kildare and Gillespie deal with a woman (Patricia Barry) who dreads giving birth to her first child.
35	2	"The Burning Sky"	Lamont Johnson	Ken Kolb	October 4, 1962	6566
In the midst of a raging forest fire, Kildare directs a medical team and is forced to deal with a medical student (Robert Redford) who would prefer to do medical research than treat patients. Note: This episode was filmed and shown in color.
36	3	"The Visitors"	Paul Wenkos	Frank Pierson	October 11, 1962	6553
The son (John Cassavetes) of a visiting dignitary from behind the Iron Curtain needs medical treatment.
37	4	"The Mask Makers"	Ralph Senensky	Jerry McNeely	October 18, 1962	6559
A young woman (Carolyn Jones) with a large nose undergoes a personality transformation after plastic surgery that ends up with her attempting to take her own life.
38	5	"Guest Appearance"	William Graham	Archie L. Tegland	October 25, 1962	TBA
After his young son dies while being treated by Kildare, an embittered late-night talk show host (Jack Carter) uses his show to try and ruin the doctor's career.
39	6	"Hastings' Farewell"	Ralph Senensky	Peggy and Lou Shaw	November 1, 1962	6552
As a result of an auto accident, a father (Harry Guardino) is unable to communicate. The man's wife (Beverly Garland) attempts to have him committed, which leads to conflict.
40	7	"Breakdown"	Lawrence Dobkin	Betty Andrews	November 8, 1962	TBA
A neurotic fellow doctor (Larry Parks) thinks that Kildare is trying to ruin him.
41	8	"The Cobweb Chain"	Boris Sagal	Ernest Kinoy	November 15, 1962	6549
A doctor (Steven Hill) from India is reluctant to accept Kildare's offer to help him qualify to practice medicine in his homeland.
42	9	"The Soul Killer"	Elliot Silverstein	George Eckstein	November 22, 1962	TBA
A nurse (Suzanne Pleshette) with a drug problem is discovered by another nurse (Eileen Heckart) with a previous drug addiction.
43	10	"An Ancient Office"	Don Medford	Theodore Apstein	December 6, 1962	6573
While visiting his hometown, Kildare becomes embroiled in a controversy when the elderly coroner (Ed Begley) makes no effort to investigate an infant who dies of sudden infant death syndrome.
44	11	"The Legacy"	Lamont Johnson	John Furia Jr.	December 13, 1962	6563
Kildare is subpoenaed to testify in a civil suit brought by the widow of an auto accident victim he had treated.
45	12	"The Bed I've Made"	Don Taylor	Jean Holloway	December 20, 1962	6536
The new director of nursing (Claire Trevor) at Blair steps on toes in trying to improve the overall efficiency of the hospital
46	13	"A Time to Every Purpose"	Don Taylor	Story by : Arthur Weiss; Teleplay by : Archie L. Tegland & Arthur Weiss	December 27, 1962	6595
A teenage girl who loses her eye in an accident must deal with her distraught mother who believes that the girl will never end up getting married because of her handicap.
47	14	"Love is a Sad Song"	Boris Sagal	Jean Holloway	January 3, 1963	TBA
Kildare falls in love with a beautiful intern (Diana Hyland) whose interest in career as a surgeon may short-circuit his marriage plans.
48	15	"The Thing Speaks for Itself"	Don Medford	John W. Bloch	January 10, 1963	6570
Kildare and Gillespie are sued for malpractice after a young woman dies from a reaction to a drug.
49	16	"The Great Guy"	James Komack	James Komack	January 17, 1963	6576
A comedian (Jack Carter) who has his leg amputated due to cancer reacts by lashing out at his wife and friends.
50	17	"The Mosaic"	David Lowell Rich	Jerry McNeely	January 31, 1963	6571
After multiple medical students develop hepatitis, Kildare works with a public health investigator to discover the source.
51	18	"The Good Luck Charm"	Jack Arnold	James Komak & Harry Kronman	February 7, 1963	6562
An aging former movie actress (Gloria Swanson) who has been unable to walk and is being protected by her personal physician, causes problems at Blair.
52	19	"Jail Ward"	Jack Arnold	Jerome B. Thomas	February 14, 1963	TBA
Kildare treats two policemen after being shot, with one of them dying. He then volunteers for work in the jail ward, where he discovers that the killer (Henry Silva) may have a blood disorder. The potential delay in his trial angers the surviving policeman (James Franciscus).
53	20	"A Trip to Niagara"	Robert Gist	Gerald Sanford	February 21, 1963	6583
After being exposed to excessive radiation that will soon blind him, a neurologist (John Larch) delays a vacation to help a patient suffering from Parkinson's disease.
54	21	"A Place Among the Monuments"	William Graham	Alvin Boretz	February 28, 1963	6557
After saving a woman (Zohra Lampert) from a barbiturate overdose, her grateful parents believe that Kildare can do no wrong despite his insistence that the woman is still in danger.
55	22	"Face of Fear"	David Friedkin	Betty Anddrews	March 7, 1963	6572
A Blair technician (Robert Culp), whose inexplicable outbursts are followed by complete blackouts of the event, is afraid that he's inheriting his father's insanity.
56	23	"Sister Mike"	Elliot Silverstein	Story by : John T. Dugan; Teleplay by : John T. Dugan & John W. Bloch	March 14, 1963	6556
Kildare attempts to have the abused children of a woman (Collin Wilcox) taken away from her, but the nun (Fay Bainter) that's been tasked with helping the family is trying to keep them together.
57	24	"A Very Infectious Disease"	Jules Bricken	Robert and Wanda Duncan	March 21, 1963	6574
A mature intern from Australia routinely ignores paperwork and hospital protocol and shows extreme hostility toward an immigrant.
58	25	"The Dark Side of the Mirror"	Lamont Johnson	Dick Nelson & William Bast	March 28, 1963	6538
The estranged twin sister of a woman (both played by Polly Bergen) who will die without a kidney transplant refuses to make the sacrifice.
59	26	"The Sleeping Princess"	Lamont Johnson	Archie L. Tegland	April 11, 1963	6551
Responding to an emergency call where a father has collapsed, Kildare discovers the man's sheltered teenage daughter who hasn't left her apartment in years. Since the father's condition is terminal, an effort is made to help the girl adapt to the outside world.
60	27	"Ship's Doctor"	Jack Arnold	Story by : Arthur Ross; Teleplay by : Archie L. Tegland & Arthur Ross	April 18, 1963	TBA
After Gillespie wins a Blair Hospital raffle for a free cruise, his trip is marked by the ship's doctor (Patrick O'Neal) being convinced that Gillespie is a company spy.
61	28	"Tightrope Into Nowhere"	Elliot Silverstein	Peggy Shaw	April 25, 1963	TBA
Kildare and the chief resident (Edward Asner) butt heads when a woman who had previously refused to concern herself with her father suddenly tries to keep him alive when he enters a terminal coma.
62	29	"The Balance and the Crucible"	Don Medford	Jerry McNeely	May 2, 1963	TBA
A doctor (Peter Falk) who also serves as a minister and is set to join his wife on a South American missionary trip has his life thrown into turmoil when she's killed.
63	30	"The Gift of the Koodjanuk"	William Graham	Walter Brough	May 9, 1963	TBA
The ability of a stranger named Alfred Freely (Brian Keith) to freely converse with anyone hides a serious health issue affecting him.
64	31	"An Island Like a Peacock"	Elliot Silverstein	Gerald Sanford	May 16, 1963	6585
After trying to visit his estranged blind daughter, a man (Forrest Tucker) suffers a heart attack. Meanwhile, the woman (Kathryn Hays) refuses to consider surgery that might allow her to regain her vision.
65	32	"To Each His Own Prison"	Don Medford	Betty Andrews	May 23, 1963	6589
A delirious alcoholic (Ross Martin) blurts out to Kildare that he embezzled money for which his business partner was convicted for in court. However, when he recovers, he denies that he ever stated such a thing.
66	33	"A Hand Held Out in Darkness"	Robert Gist	Jean Holloway	May 30, 1963	TBA
A young, unconscious girl is found in a local and brought to Blair, with no one coming to identify her. Further investigation indicates the likelihood of an emotional trauma being the cause of her condition.
67	34	"What's God to Julius?"	Robert Gist	Adrian Spies	June 6, 1963	6906
A man Benny (Martin Balsam) who has been caring for his mentally challenged younger brother Julius (Sorrell Booke) by himself, discovers that he's terminally ill and becomes concerned about his brother's future.

=== Season 3 (1963–64) ===
No. overall	No. in season	Title	Directed by	Written by	Original release date	Prod. code
68	1	"Whoever Heard of a Two-Headed Doll?"	Don Medford	Jerry McNeely	September 26, 1963	6926
Kildare must decide whether or not to tell a man or his seemingly frivolous wife that he's dying of leukemia.
69	2	"The Good Samaritan"	Elliot Silverstein	Donald S. Sanford	October 3, 1963	6912
A prosecuting attorney and a rural woman accuse Kildare of malpractice, putting his career in the balance.
70	3	"If You Can't Believe the Truth"	John Newland	Irene Winston	October 10, 1963	6919
While a cantankerous business tycoon (James Whitmore) is under observation, a nurse (Barbara Eden) announces she's looking for a rich husband.
71	4	"The Heart, an Imperfect Machine"	Robert Butler	Story by : Pete Morrow; Teleplay by : Dick Nelson	October 17, 1963	6907
A doctor (Pat Hingle) has spent years developing a heart-lung machine in an effort to save his wife (Diane Baker), but his long hours have helped damage the marriage.
72	5	"A Game for Three"	Paul Wendkos	Jerry McNeely	October 24, 1963	6905
An intern (Andrew Prine) accuses Kildare of having an affair with his wife (Susan Strasberg).
73	6	"The Exploiters"	Leonard Horn	Richard Levinson & William Link	October 31, 1963	6929
A widow (Glenda Farrell) is victimized by an unscrupulous funeral director, outraging her daughter (Nancy Malone), who is a nurse at Blair.
74	7	"One Clear, Bright Thursday Morning"	Leonard Horn	Margaret & Paul Schneider	November 7, 1963	6920
A Japanese woman (Miyoshi Umeki fears for the life of her unborn child because she is suffering from the complications of having survived the atomic blast at Nagasaki.
75	8	"The Eleventh Commandment"	John Newland	Theodore Apstein & Sidney A. Mandel	November 14, 1963	6911
An embittered Jewish woman (Molly Picon) used to laying guilt trips on her children becomes angry when her son becomes interested in the woman (Susan Oliver) sharing her hospital room.
76	9	"Four Feet in the Morning"	Jack Smight	Jerry De Bono	November 21, 1963	
An unwed teenage couple (Tony Dow and Marta Kristen) are plunged into emotional turmoil along with their parents. Part one of a crossover episode with The Eleventh Hour
77	10	"The Pack Rat and the Prima Donna"	Paul Wendkos	James Gunn	November 28, 1963	6924
A nurse (Celeste Holm) and doctor (Ed Nelson) clash in a variety of ways regarding Blair's medical equipment.
78	11	"The Backslider"	John Newland	Archie L. Tegland	December 5, 1963	6928
Kildare criticizes the diagnostic techniques of emotional veteran physician (Kevin McCarthy), which leads to tragedy.
79	12	"Charlie Wade Makes Lots of Shade"	Allen Miner	Story by : Jerry McNeely & Marshall Goldberg; Teleplay by : Jerry McNeely	December 12, 1963	6927
Obese Charlie Wade makes a sincere effort at dieting, but the ensuing ridicule causes him to try and commit suicide.
80	13	"The Oracle"	Jack Smight	Gene Wang	December 19, 1963	6932
A high-profile Washington columnist (Lauren Bacall) who usually has all the answers is stumped when she's given a diagnosis of multiple sclerosis.
81	14	"A Vote of Confidence"	Paul Wendkos	Richard Levinson & William Link	December 26, 1963	6933
A doctor (Eddie Albert) believes that Gillespie is past his prime and mounts a campaign to replace him as Blair's chief of staff.
82	15	"A Willing Suspension of Disbelief"	Leonard Horn	Harold Gast	January 9, 1964	6922
A former football star (Jack Lord) who's now a surgeon at Blair has a crippling case of arthritis that he attempts to shield through the use of drugs that were prescribed by a quack.
83	16	"Tyger, Tyger: Part 1"	John Newland	Ben Masselink	January 16, 1964	6915
A woman (Yvette Mimieux) with epilepsy refuses to give up the sport of surfing, even though a seizure could result in her death.
84	17	"Tyger, Tyger: Part 2"	John Newland	Ben Masselink	January 23, 1964	6925
While trying to maintain a watch on his epileptic patient who refuses to listen to reason, Kildare must also attempt to keep an unhappy woman from resuming her destructive drinking habits.
85	18	"Never Too Old for the Circus"	Paul Wendkos	Story by : Eric Peters; Teleplay by : Jameson Brewer	January 30, 1964	6949
The desire of a retired surgeon (Walter Pidgeon) who wants to resume his practice results only in heartbreak for his grandson.
86	19	"Onions, Garlic and Flowers That Bloom in the Spring"	John Newland	Theodore Apstein	February 6, 1964	6923
When a general practitioner (Cesar Romero) in a rundown neighborhood becomes ill, Kildare is asked to take over his practice.
87	20	"To Walk in Grace"	Ida Lupino	Joy Dexter	February 13, 1964	6944
A writer (Gena Rowlands) who specializes in medical fiction novels becomes ill while researching her next book at Blair.
88	21	"Goodbye, Mr. Jersey"	John Newland	Irene Winston	February 20, 1964	6947
An actress (Suzanne Pleshette), a millionaire, an intern (Anthony Holland) and a sheep dog upset the daily routine at Blair.
89	22	"Why Won't Anybody Listen?"	John Newland	Calvin Clements	February 27, 1964	6946
Shocked into confusion by the unexpected death of his granddaughter and infuriated by what he perceives as disrespectful laughter in the wake of the tragedy, a man (Claude Rains) takes severe measures to get his point across.
90	23	"The Child Between"	Allen Miner	Phillip Saltzman	March 5, 1964	6903
A diabetic (Beau Bridges) attempts to punish his divorced, squabbling parents by gambling with his life.
91	24	"A Hundred Million Tomorrows"	Don Medford	Jerome B. Thomas	March 12, 1964	6901
A tycoon (Paul Burke) on the verge of a proxy fight suffers a heart attack and then must fend off the unscrupulous moves of his assistant (George Grizzard) and the assistant's wife (Diana Van Der Vlis).
92	25	"Tomorrow is a Fickle Girl"	Paul Wendkos	James F. Griffin	March 19, 1964	6945
A teenage boy (Sal Mineo) is practicing medicine without a license and quickly learns that a little knowledge can be dangerous.
93	26	"Quid Pro Quo"	Don Medford	Archie L. Tegland	March 26, 1964	6948
One medical student (Robert Walker) is dedicated, but inept, while another (Michael Callan) is brilliant, but irresponsible.
94	27	"A Day to Remember"	John Newland	Calvin Clements	April 2, 1964	6937
A woman's (Anne Baxter) grief over the death of her son causes her to take steps that lead to another tragedy.
95	28	"An Ungodly Act"	Don Medford	Calvin Clements	April 9, 1964	
Kildare faces a lawsuit and unsavory publicity when he charges another doctor (Douglas Fairbanks Jr.) with negligence.
96	29	"A Nickel's Worth of Prayer"	John Newland	Agnes Ridgway	April 16, 1964	6943
An ailing elderly man (Ed Begley) and a lonely young girl (Kim Darby) develop a friendship that each of them needs.
97	30	"Night of the Beast"	James Goldstone	Richard Fielder	April 23, 1964	6917
After flunking out of medical school, a man (Bradford Dillman) becomes a thief and takes revenge on Kildare by raping his girlfriend (Carol Rossen).
98	31	"The Middle of Ernie Mann"	Don Medford	Margaret & Paul Schneider	April 30, 1964	6941
Rising heavyweight boxer Ernie Mann (Terry Carter) ignores Kildare's pleas to quit in order to provide financial security for his family.
99	32	"A Sense of Tempo"	John Newland	Don Balluck	May 7, 1964	6956
An author (Cyril Ritchard) comes to the hospital to die, even though tests reveal that there's nothing wrong with him.
100	33	"Speak Not in Angry Whispers"	Leo Penn	Edward J. Lasko	May 14, 1964	6966
A man admits his love for his estranged wife when he discovers that she's seriously ill.
101	34	"Dolly's Dilemma"	John Newland	Ken Kolb	May 21, 1964	6957
A wealthy widow (Joan Blondell) is convinced that the widowed Gillespie wants to marry her, leading to rumors around the hospital.

=== Season 4 (1964–65) ===
No. overall	No. in season	Title	Directed by	Written by	Original release date	Prod. code
102	1	"Man is a Rock"	Leo Penn	Christopher Knopf	September 24, 1964	6953
A hard-driving salesman (Walter Matthau) puts his life at risk by refusing to cut back on his fast-paced lifestyle.
103	2	"Maybe Love Will Save My Apartment House"	Ralph Senensky	Boris Sobelman	October 1, 1964	6967
Dr. Gillespie plays matchmaker for his flaky niece Serena (Suzy Parker), fixing her up with a girl-chasing doctor (Barry Nelson). However, things don't go according to plan.
104	3	"The Hand That Hurts, the Hand That Heals"	Leo Penn	Edward J. Lakso	October 8, 1964	6977
A career woman (Janice Rule) resents Dr. Kildare's efforts to keep her alive.
105	4	"The Last Leaves on the Tree"	Jack Smight	Robert Presnell Jr.	October 15, 1964	
A greedy grandson attempts to gain control of an estate by accusing the rest of the family of senility.
106	5	"What's Different About Today?"	Leo Penn	Jerry McNeely	October 22, 1964	6952
A 15-year-old girl (Kim Darby) at a camp for those suffering from diabetes falls in love with Dr. Kildare and nearly causes a tragedy.
107	6	"The Sound of a Faraway Hill"	Alf Kjellin	Edward J. Lakso & Don Tiat	October 29, 1964	6958
An ailing baseball player (Lee Marvin) and a terminally ill boy bond together to give each other courage.
108	7	"A Candle in the Window"	Sydney Pollack	Rita Lakin	November 5, 1964	6972
The denial of any display of grief by a Blair nurse (Ruth Roman) following the death of her husband is negatively affecting her son (Ron Howard) and causing great concern on the part of Dr. Kildare and Dr. Gillespie.
109	8	"Rome Will Never Leave You: Part 1"	John Newland	Sally Benson	November 12, 1964	
Traveling to Rome on a medical mission, Dr. Kildare falls in love and Dr. Gillespie rekindles a romance that began during World War II.
110	9	"Rome Will Never Leave You: Part 2"	John Newland	Sally Benson	November 19, 1964	
Both Dr. Kildare and Dr. Gillespie come face-to-face with their chief rival for the affections of the women that they're romancing.
111	10	"Rome Will Never Leave You: Part 3"	John Newland	Sally Benson	November 26, 1964	
Dr. Gillespie comes to the conclusion that his romance must remain a memory, while Dr. Kildare refuses to do the same.
112	11	"The Elusive Dik-Dik"	John Newland	Barre Lyndon	December 3, 1964	6954
Dr. Kildare faces a grave decision when a noted doctor and his son are both stricken with a rare fever.
113	12	"Catch a Crooked Mouse"	Boris Sagal	Stanley Niss	December 17, 1964	6976
A dying woman (Fay Spain) is facing questioning regarding a murder case, but Dr. Kildare refuses to let the district attorney and a detective interview her.
114	13	"An Exchange of Gifts"	Richard Sarafian	Irving Pearlberg	December 24, 1964	6935
A derelict (Rip Torn) is so sure that he's going to die, he gives his money to his fellow patients. When he discovers that he'll live, he demands the money back.
115	14	"Never is a Long Day"	Leo Penn	Rita Lakin	December 31, 1964	6934
A dying doctor (Walter Slezak) is hoping to make his wife self-sufficient before he dies. While Dr. Gillespie attempts to help him, he's plagued by a panicky intern during crucial moments.
116	15	"Lullaby for an Indian Summer"	Herschel Daugherty	Jameson Brewer	January 7, 1965	6975
A doctor (Robert Young) and his wife discover that they're going to be parents shortly before the doctor discovers that he's dying. He and his wife (Margaret Leighton) then adjust separately to the devastating news.
117	16	"Take Care of My Little Girl"	Alf Kjellin	Irving Pearlberg	January 14, 1965	6969
A songwriter Eddie (Larry Blyden), the husband of Blair employee Helen (Gail Kobe), who's seeking to recapture success neglects his responsibilities as both a husband and father. That indifference becomes even more outrageous when his daughter Nancy (Veronica Cartwright) is diagnosed with cancer.
118	17	"My Name is Lisa, and I Am Lost"	Jud Taylor	James F. Griffith	January 21, 1965	
A mild-mannered nurse (Lois Nettleton) is forced to deal with a mean and irascible woman (Nina Foch).
119	18	"Please Let My Baby Live"	Leo Penn	Max Hodge	January 28, 1965	7902
A former nurse at Blair (Diana Hyland) has had three previous miscarriages because of the Rh factor and is currently in the eighth month of her current pregnancy.
120	19	"No Mother to Guide Them"	John Newland	Adrian Spies	February 4, 1965	
Cab driver Ernie Duffy (Jack Warden) is suffering from a serious heart ailment, but begs Dr. Kildare to let him keep driving for two more months in order to pay for training that will allow him to take a less-strenuous job.
121	20	"A Marriage of Convenience"	Herschel Daugherty	Agnes Ridgway & Don Balluck	February 11, 1965	
An orderly (Burt Brinkerhoff) is tricked into marrying a woman (Louise Sorel) who is carrying another man's child.
122	21	"Make Way for Tomorrow"	Herschel Daugherty	E. Arthur Kean	February 18, 1965	
An old sailor (Ed Begley) and an elderly Italian man (Frank Puglia) are roommates. The sailor attempts to use yoga to control his own death, while the other man is plagued by omens of death in his dreams.
123	22	"A Miracle for Margaret"	John Newland	Arthur L. Murphy & Irving Pearlberg	February 25, 1965	
A doctor's (Barbara Bel Geddes) cold-blooded attention to medical research antagonizes both Dr. Kildare and Dr. Gillespie
124	23	"Do You Trust Your Doctor?"	Leo Penn	Jerry McNeely	March 4, 1965	6989
After he loses a patient, a doctor (Robert Culp) loses his self-confidence and is so unsure about himself that he simply starts referring his patients to specialists.
125	24	"All Brides Should Be Beautiful"	Alf Kjellin	Edward J. Lasko	March 11, 1965	
Dr. Kildare is a helpless bystander as a brilliant but plain woman (Colleen Dewhurst) is faced with cancer surgery. She's afraid that her worried husband (Tom Bosley), whom she married based more on a fear of being alone than for love, will reject her.
126	25	"She Loves Me, She Loves Me Not: Part 1"	Leo Penn	Jerry McNeely	March 18, 1965	6990
A date with a woman (Angie Dickinson) nearly leads to tragedy after Dr. Kildare is injured in an auto accident.
127	26	"She Loves Me, She Loves Me Not: Part 2"	Leo Penn	Jerry McNeely	March 25, 1965	6991
In the aftermath of his accident, Dr. Kildare becomes engaged. However, he soon learns an unpleasant truth about his fiancee.
128	27	"A Journey to Sunrise"	Ralph Senensky	Jack Curtis	April 1, 1965	
A cancer-stricken, French-speaking hillbilly (played by Raymond Massey in a dual role) refuses to divulge any information about himself and refuses to take any pain medication.
129	28	"The Time Buyers"	John Newland	Archie Lawrence & Max Hodge	April 8, 1965	6961
A doctor (Patricia Barry) is willing to risk her life by donating her kidney in order to save her son. She chooses to take these actions rather than reveal a 15-year-old secret.
130	29	"Music Hath Charms"	Sidney Miller	Edward J. Lasko	April 15, 1965	6986
Dr. Gillespie puts Dr. Kildare in charge of producing the annual nurses and residents' review at Blair.
131	30	"Believe and Live"	John Newland	Boris Sobleman	April 22, 1965	7909
A famed medical lawyer (Dan O'Herlihy) with potential political aspirations is convinced that he has cancer, primarily because his twin brother recently died of the disease.
132	31	"A Reverence for Life"	Jud Taylor	Archie L. Tegland	April 29, 1965	6963
Dr. Kildare is involved in an auto accident, which severely injures a woman who's in need of a blood transfusion. Both she and her husband (Dennis Weaver) refuse to consider that option because of their religious beliefs.
133	32	"Wings of Hope"	John Newland	Max Hodge	May 13, 1965	7911
While flying home from vacation, Dr. Kildare must attend to the pilot (Earl Holliman) who's stricken with a mysterious illness and could be forced to give up flying. In the meantime, the stewardess (Sharon Farrell) who continues to carry a torch for him anxiously awaits the outcome.

=== Season 5 (1965–66) ===
No. overall	No. in season	Title	Directed by	Written by	Original release date
134	1	"Behold the Great Man"	John Brahm	Adrian Spies	September 13, 1965
Following a death of a patient Dr. Kildare clashes with the renowned and arrogant Dr. Maxwell Becker (James Mason) challenging his wisdom in how he treated the patient.
135	2	"A Life for a Life"	John Brahm	Adrian Spies	September 14, 1965
Following a severe car accident, Dr. Becker ends up in Dr. Kildare's care.
136	3	"Web of Hate"	John Brahm	Adrian Spies	September 20, 1965
Dr. Becker attempts suicide but Dr. Kildare thwarts it, angering Becker even more. He becomes determined to exact revenge on Kildare.
137	4	"Horizontal Hero"	John Brahm	Adrian Spies	September 21, 1965
Dr. Becker is partially paralyzed and a wheelchair user. The man responsible for his injuries suffered severe burns. Despite his condition, Becker performs surgery on him.
138	5	"The Bell in the Schoolhouse Tolls for Thee, Kildare"	Jud Taylor	Jerry De Bono	September 27, 1965
Kildare is tasked with teaching three challenging third-year medical students.
139	6	"Life in the Dance Hall"	Jud Taylor	Jerry De Bono	September 28, 1965
As he gets more deeply involved in the personal issues of his three protégés. Kildare unintentionally attracts the wrath of his teaching assistant.
140	7	"Some Doors Are Slamming"	Jud Taylor	Jerry De Bono	October 5, 1965
Kildare's teaching assistant and the three trainees are causing more and more anxiety. Warren lacks confidence and struggles to deal with sexism from patients and medical professionals.
141	8	"Enough La Boheme for Everybody"	Jud Taylor	Jerry De Bono	October 11, 1965
Hartwood confronts his wife and Devereaux needs to short out his personal life. Gillespie has no choice but to dismiss Helvick.
142	9	"Now the Mummy"	Jud Taylor	Jerry De Bono	October 12, 1965
Devereaux convinces people to protest Helvick's dismissal but finds out Helvick lied to him about the real reason he was terminated.
143	10	"A Pyrotechnic Display"	Jud Taylor	Jerry De Bono	October 18, 1965
Kidare refuses to accept Frankie's decision after a patient dies unexpectedly prompting Frankie to leave training.
144	11	"With Hellfire and Thunder"	Jud Taylor	Christopher Knoff	October 19, 1965
Morgan Bannion (James Daly), a pretentious actor with a drinking problem, refuses to give up alcohol and accept that he has cirrhosis. Instead he is convinced he is dying of cancer.
145	12	"Daily Flights to Olympus"	Jud Taylor	Christopher Knoff	October 25, 1965
After getting into a brawl at a bar, Bannion sustains serious injuries, yet he still unwilling to accept the truth.
146	13	"The Life Machine"	Marc Daniels	Jerome Ross	October 26, 1965
Blair General is offering a novel treatment that may save lives, but it's limited to a select few thus Kildare and Gillespie have to pick from dozens of eligible patients.
147	14	"Toast the Golden Couple"	Marc Daniels	Jerome Ross	November 1, 1965
Five patients are candidates for the novel kidney dialysis and Kildare discovers their spouses having problems. Nurse Fain, whose husband has kidney disease is too old to be taken into account.
148	15	"Wives and Losers"	Marc Daniels	Jerome Ross	November 2, 1965
One of the five patients become furious when he finds out the selection process is based on social worth, another leaves the hospital without permission.
149	16	"Welcome Home, Dear Anna"	Marc Daniels	Jerome Ross	November 8, 1965
Kildare helps a young mental health patient and her family to get back to normal life
150	17	"A Little Child Shall Lead"	Marc Daniels	Jerome Ross	November 9, 1965
The courage and strength of a seriously ill child makes adults confront their own fears and conflicts
151	18	"Hour of Decision"	Marc Daniels	Jerome Ross	November 15, 1965
Four patients are selected for dialysis treatment based on chance of survival, age and dependents
152	19	"Aftermath"	Marc Daniels	Jerome Ross	November 16, 1965
The patients not chosen have to cope with the consequences of the committee's life-and-death decision
153	20	"Fathers and Daughters"	Herschel Daugherty	William Fay	November 22, 1965
154	21	"A Gift of Love"	Herschel Daugherty	William Fay	November 23, 1965
155	22	"The Tent Dwellers"	Herschel Daugherty	William Fay	November 29, 1965
156	23	"Going Home"	Herschel Daugherty	William Fay	November 30, 1965
157	24	"Something Old, Something New"	John Brahm	Edward J. Lasko	December 6, 1965
158	25	"To Visit One More Spring"	John Brahm	Edward J. Lasko	December 7, 1965
159	26	"From Nigeria with Love"	Michael Ritchie	Meyer Dolinsky	December 13, 1965
160	27	"In the Roman Candle's Bright Glare"	Michael Ritchie	John T. Dugan	December 14, 1965
161	28	"When Shadows Fall"	Michael Ritchie	Meyer Dolinsky	December 20, 1965
162	29	"With This Ring"	Michael Ritchie	Meyer Dolinsky	December 21, 1965
163	30	"Perfect is Too Hard to Be"	Alf Kjellin	John W. Bloch	December 27, 1965
164	31	"Duet for One Hand"	Alf Kjellin	John W. Bloch	December 28, 1965
165	32	"The Atheist and the True Believer"	Herschel Daugherty	Unknown	January 3, 1966
An outspoken atheist is admitted to Blair Hospital at the same time as an evangelist. First of six parts.
166	33	"A Quick Look at Glory"	Herschel Daugherty	Unknown	January 4, 1966
Militant atheist Justin Post has had a bad heart attack; it is suggested that this might be "divine retribution".
167	34	"A Sort of Falling in Love"	Herschel Daugherty	Unknown	January 10, 1966
To everyone's surprise, militant atheist Justin Post becomes a believer in God.
168	35	"The Last to Believe in Miracles"	Herschel Daugherty	Unknown	January 11, 1966
Is the religious conversion of former atheist Justin Post genuine, or is he simply afraid of dying?
169	36	"The Next Thing to Murder"	Herschel Daugherty	Unknown	January 17, 1966
Justin Post plans to leave the hospital to appear on Reverend Webb's television show and testify to his conversion, despite the danger to his health. Kildare plans to stop him, even by declaring him mentally damaged, until he talks to another patient who has had his faith restored by Post.
170	37	"Never So Happy"	Herschel Daugherty	Unknown	January 18, 1966
Justin Post appears on Webb's show to proclaim his conversion, despite the risk to his heart. Conclusion of six-part story.
171	38	"A Cry From the Street"	Corey Allen	Unknown	January 24, 1966
172	39	"Gratitude Won't Pay the Bills"	Corey Allen	Unknown	January 25, 1966
173	40	"Adrift in a Sea of Confusion"	Corey Allen	Unknown	January 31, 1966
174	41	"These Hands That Heal"	Corey Allen	Unknown	February 1, 1966
175	42	"A Few Hearts, a Few Flowers"	Herschel Daugherty	Unknown	February 7, 1966
176	43	"Some Tales for Halloween"	Herschel Daugherty	Unknown	February 8, 1966
177	44	"I Can Hear the Ice Melting"	Herschel Daugherty	Unknown	February 14, 1966
178	45	"No Other Road"	Herschel Daugherty	Unknown	February 15, 1966
179	46	"The Encroachment"	Alf Kjellin	Archie L. Tegland	February 21, 1966
180	47	"A Patient Lost"	Alf Kjellin	Archie L. Tegland	February 22, 1966
181	48	"What Happened to All the Sunshine and Roses?"	Alf Kjellin	Archie L. Tegland	February 28, 1966
182	49	"The Taste of Crow"	Alf Kjellin	Archie L. Tegland	March 7, 1966
183	50	"Out of a Concrete Tower"	Alf Kjellin	Archie L. Tegland	March 8, 1966
184	51	"The Art of Taking a Powder"	Herschel Daugherty	Unknown	March 14, 1966
185	52	"Read the Book and Then See the Picture"	Herschel Daugherty	Unknown	March 15, 1966
186	53	"A Sometimes Distant Spring"	John Brahm	Unknown	March 21, 1965
187	54	"Travel a Crooked Road"	John Brahm	Edward J. Lakso	March 22, 1966
188	55	"Mercy or Murder"	John Brahm	Unknown	March 28, 1966
189	56	"Strange Sort of Accident"	John Brahm	Unknown	March 29, 1966
190	57	"New Doctor in Town"	John Brahm	Unknown	April 4, 1966
191	58	"Reckoning"	John Brahm	Unknown	April 5, 1966
