= Eddie Ryder =

American television and film actor

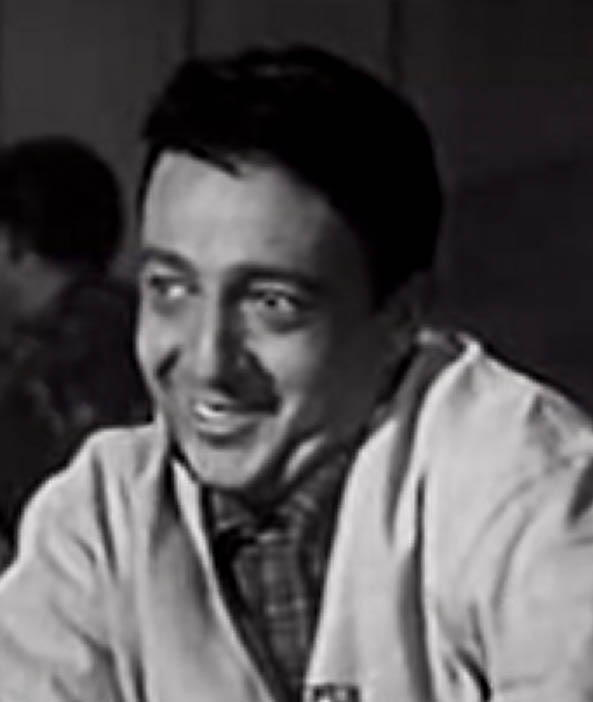
- Ryder in Hot Rod Girl (1956)
- Born: January 23, 1923; New York City, U.S.
- Died: March 29, 1997 (aged 74); El Paso, Texas, U.S.
- Other names: Ed Ryker; Eddie Reider; Edward Reider; Edward Ryder
- Occupations: Actor; writer; director
- Years active: 1953–1987

Eddie Ryder (January 23, 1923 – March 29, 1997) was an American television and film actor, as well as a writer and television director.

== Career ==
Ryder was a veteran of 92 movies and television programs. His television career began at age 29 playing a high school boy on the December 26, 1953 Adventures of Superman episode titled My Friend Superman with George Reeves, Jack Larson, and Noel Neill. Ryder preceded this with playing Ronald on the January 31, 1953 Space Patrol episode Runaway Planetoid.

=== 1950s ===
Ryder would go on in the 1950s to appear in several TV series, many as an uncredited actor, and top films.

- Television: He then performed in John Drew Barrymore's Matinee Theater episode of The Alumni Reunion which aired September 26, 1956 with Don Keefer and Constance Ford. He continued on in minor TV roles on The Ford Television Theatre and Goodyear Theatre, Casey Jones, M Squad, the popular Make Room For Daddy, The Thin Man, and Steve Canyon. He also co-starred as Eliot on The Dennis O'Keefe Show. In 1954 he guest-starred in an episode of The George Burns and Gracie Allen Show as an aspiring entertainer, capably performing several celebrity impressions, including James Stewart and James Cagney.
- Film: He co-starred as "Two Tanks" in Hot Rod Girl (1956). He also appeared in The Comedian (1957) with Mickey Rooney, Operation Mad Ball (1957) with Jack Lemmon, and Kings Go Forth (1958) starring Frank Sinatra.

Roxanne Arlen and Ryder in Hot Rod Girl (1956)

=== 1960s ===
The 1960s brought several credited appearances in major TV and film.

- Television: Four episodes in 1964 of Death Valley Days, as Mason on Combat! (episode: The Glory Among Men) (1964), The Andy Griffith Show (1964), Bewitched (1965), as Dr. Simon Agurski on Dr. Kildare (1961, 1965), The Munsters (1965), The Twilight Zone (episode "Mr. Dingle, the Strong"), The Dick Van Dyke Show (1965) and three episodes of Bonanza (1961-1969). He also played Winston "Bones" Snodgrass in Our Miss Brooks.
- Film: His film career during this time yielded a secondary role in the film Son of Flubber (1963) with Fred MacMurray. In 1963, the massive $9 million, 12 star-studded production, It's a Mad, Mad, Mad, Mad World which starred Sid Caesar, Ethel Merman, Spencer Tracy, Mickey Rooney, and Milton Berle among others gave Ryder the role of air traffic control staffer. The Oscar (1966) nominated for two Academy Awards and starring notables Milton Berle, Elke Sommer, Joseph Cotten, Tony Bennett, and Walter Brennan. Ryder won the role of Sgt. Gilroy in Not with My Wife, You Don't! (1967) starring Tony Curtis and played a minor role in The Big Mouth (1967) starring Jerry Lewis.
- Directing: In 1969, Ryder directed the Get Smart episode "Greer Window".

=== 1970s ===
The 1970s kept Ryder in television as a secondary actor and mostly making single appearances.

- Television: Here Come the Brides (1970), Get Smart (1970), Mission Impossible (1972), Bonanza (1972, "One Ace Too Many"), and several appearances in Mannix, among many others.
- Film: Ryder was cast in the campy Stacey and Her Gangbusters (1973) and Mel Brooks's High Anxiety (1977), his last film appearance.
- Directing: In 1976, Ryder directed The Bob Newhart Show episode No Sale, and in 1979 directed the film Up Yours - A Rockin' Comedy which starred Belinda Balaski, Michael Paul Chan, and George 'Buck' Flower.

During the 1980s, Ryder appeared in The Dukes of Hazzard, Hill Street Blues, and General Hospital. In 1986, Ryder appeared in the comedy film A Masterpiece of Murder with Bob Hope and Don Ameche.

He died in El Paso, Texas.

== Filmography ==
- The Human Jungle (1954) - Youngster (uncredited)
- The Bamboo Prison (1954) - Jones (uncredited)
- The Country Girl (1954) - Ed
- The Girl Rush (1955) - Bellboy (uncredited)
- Hot Rod Girl (1956) - Two Tanks
- Somebody Up There Likes Me (1956) - Prisoner (uncredited)
- The Young Stranger (1957) - Man in Movie Theatre (uncredited)
- Operation Mad Ball (1957) - Allison (uncredited)
- Kings Go Forth (1958) - Cpl. Lindsay
- Tarawa Beachhead (1958) - Lt. Lou Gideon
- FBI Code 98 (1962) - Lloyd Kinsel
- Son of Flubber (1963) - Mr. Osborne
- It's a Mad, Mad, Mad, Mad World (1963) - Rancho Conejo air traffic controller (uncredited)
- One Man's Way (1964) - Gas Station Attendant
- The New Interns (1964) - Dr. Walters
- The Patsy (1964) - Man at Party (uncredited)
- Your Home Sweet Home Is My Home (1965) - Bert Steele
- Three on a Couch (1966) - Meek Man (uncredited)
- The Oscar (1966) - Mexican Marriage Broker
- Not with My Wife, You Don't! (1966) - Sgt. Gilroy
- The Big Mouth (1967) - Specs
- Stacey (1973)
- Teenage Seductress (1975) - Grocer
- Silent Movie (1976) - British Officer
- High Anxiety (1977) - Doctor at Convention
- Up Yours (1979) - Man on the Street / Obscene Caller / Chief Looney
