= Dr. Kildare (TV series) =

American medical drama television series (1961–1966)

- DVD cover
- Genre: Medical drama
- Created by: James Komack
- Starring: Richard Chamberlain; Raymond Massey
- Country of origin: United States
- No. of seasons: 5
- No. of episodes: 191 (list of episodes)

Production
- Executive producer: Norman Felton
- Running time: 60 minutes (seasons 1–4); 30 minutes (season 5)
- Production companies: Arena Productions; MGM Television

Original release
- Network: NBC
- Release: September 28, 1961 – August 30, 1966

Dr. Kildare is an NBC medical drama television series which originally ran from September 28, 1961, until August 30, 1966, for a total of 191 episodes over five seasons. Produced by MGM Television, it was based on fictional doctor characters originally created by author Max Brand in the 1930s and previously used by MGM in a popular film series and radio drama. The TV series quickly achieved success and made a star of Richard Chamberlain, who played the title role. Dr. Kildare (along with an ABC medical drama, Ben Casey, which premiered at the same time) inspired or influenced many later TV shows dealing with the medical field. Dr. Kildare aired on NBC affiliate stations on Thursday nights at 8:30–9:30 p.m. until September 1965, when the timeslot was changed to Monday and Tuesday nights at 8:30–9:00 p.m. through the end of the show's run.

== Plot ==
Like the 1938–1942 MGM film series, the TV series initially told the story of young intern Dr. James Kildare (Richard Chamberlain) working at the fictional large metropolitan "Blair General Hospital" and trying to learn his profession, deal with patients' problems, and win the respect of the senior Dr. Leonard Gillespie (Raymond Massey). In the series' third episode, "Shining Image", Gillespie tells the earnest Kildare, "Our work is to keep people alive. We can't tell them how to live any more than how to die." Kildare ignores the advice, which provides the basis for stories over the next four seasons, many with a soap opera touch. By the third season, Dr. Kildare was promoted to resident and episodes began to focus less on him and his medical colleagues, and more on the stories of individual patients and their families.

In order to create realistic scripts, the series' first writer, E. Jack Neuman, spent several months working alongside interns in a large hospital. Episodes frequently highlighted diseases or medical conditions that had not been widely discussed on television, including drug addiction, sickle cell anemia and epilepsy. Episodes about venereal disease (personally requested by President Lyndon B. Johnson) and the birth control pill were written, but never produced due to network objections. Technical advice was provided by the American Medical Association, whose name appeared in the end credits of each episode.

The series was initially formatted as self-contained one-hour episodes, aired once per week. In later seasons, a trend towards serialized drama, inspired by the success of the prime time soap opera Peyton Place, caused the network to develop some Dr. Kildare storylines over multiple episodes and, in the final season, to air two separate half-hour episodes each week instead of a single one-hour episode.

== Cast ==
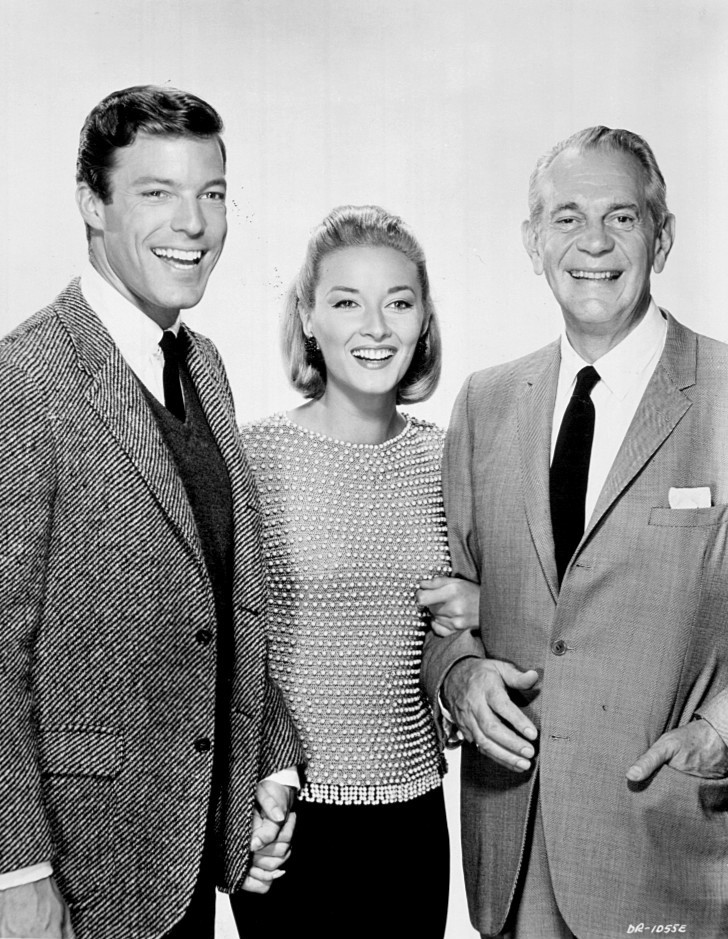
Publicity photo from "Rome Will Never Leave You". Both doctors travel to Rome, where Kildare finds romance with Italian actress Daniela Bianchi.

An unsold and unaired pilot, directed by John Newland, was shot in 1960 featuring Lew Ayres as Dr. Kildare and (Joseph) Joe Cronin as Dr. Grayson. As a younger man, Ayres had played the role of Kildare for many years in the earlier MGM film and radio series. Later, a second, successful pilot was made with Richard Chamberlain as Kildare and Raymond Massey as Gillespie.

Before the little-known Chamberlain was cast, the Kildare role was offered to William Shatner and James Franciscus, who both turned it down. (Shatner would go on to make several guest appearances on the show.) The role catapulted Chamberlain to fame. In 2006, Chamberlain reprised the Kildare role in a parody of Grey's Anatomy (along with other famous TV doctors from Julia, St. Elsewhere, M*A*S*H and The Love Boat) on the 2006 TV Land Awards.

Massey accepted the role of Dr. Gillespie thinking that it would last only one season, leaving him time to accept feature film roles. Instead, the time demands of appearing in a multiple-season hit series prevented Massey from appearing in any films for the duration of the series' run.

=== Supporting cast ===
Supporting cast members with recurring roles included Ken Berry as Dr. John Kapish, Jean Inness as Nurse Beatrice Fain, Eddie Ryder as Dr. Simon Agurski, Jud Taylor (who also directed several episodes) as Dr. Thomas Gerson, Steve Bell as Dr. Quint Lowry, Clegg Hoyt as Mac, Sam Reese as Dr. Dan Shanks (first season), John Napier as Reverend Ken Cleveland, Jo Helton as Nurse Conant, and Lee Kurty as Nurse Zoe Lawton.

=== Guest cast ===
Over the years, numerous well-known or soon-to-be well-known actors appeared as guest stars, including:

- Eddie Albert
- Jack Albertson
- Fred Astaire
- Ed Asner
- Mary Astor
- Jerry Ayres
- Lauren Bacall
- Barbara Barrie
- Anne Baxter
- Ed Begley
- Fred Beir
- Russ Bender
- Charles Bickford
- Joan Blondell
- Tom Bosley
- Hank Brandt
- Beau Bridges
- Charles Bronson
- Robert Burton
- James Caan
- Conlan Carter
- Lawrence P. Casey
- John Cassavetes
- John Cliff
- Sidney Clute
- Marian Collier
- Noreen Corcoran
- Joseph Cotten
- Robert Culp
- Kim Darby
- Ossie Davis
- Ruby Dee
- Bob Denver
- Angie Dickinson
- Kem Dibbs
- Don Dubbins
- Olympia Dukakis
- Barbara Eden
- Linda Evans
- Douglas Fairbanks Jr.
- Peter Falk
- Dick Foran
- Anne Francis
- Elisabeth Fraser (as Elizabeth Fraser)
- Beverly Garland
- Thomas Gomez
- Harold Gould
- Herman Hack
- James Hampton
- Arthur Hanson
- Peter Helm
- Tim Herbert
- Bern Hoffman
- Celeste Holm
- Ron Howard
- Clark Howat
- Rodolfo Hoyos Jr.
- Gary Hunley
- Kim Hunter
- Carolyn Jones
- James Earl Jones
- Victor Jory
- Brian Keith
- Ray Kellogg
- Warren J. Kemmerling
- Richard Kiley
- Jess Kirkpatrick
- Ted Knight
- Harvey Korman
- Otto Kruger
- William Lanteau
- John Lasell
- Cloris Leachman
- William Leslie
- Margie Liszt
- Jack Lord
- Lisa Loring
- Dorothy Malone
- Lee Marvin
- James Mason
- Walter Matthau
- Ken Mayer
- Mercedes McCambridge
- Gavin McLeod
- Yvette Mimieux
- Sal Mineo
- Ricardo Montalbán
- Harry Morgan
- Jan Murray
- Barry Nelson
- Jack Nicholson
- Leonard Nimoy
- Ramon Novarro
- Margaret O'Brien
- Richard O'Brien
- Carroll O'Connor
- Dan O'Herlihy
- Susan Oliver
- Robert Phillips
- Walter Pidgeon
- Edward Platt
- Suzanne Pleshette
- Joe Ploski
- John Qualen
- Claude Rains
- Basil Rathbone
- Robert Redford
- Robert Reed
- Cyril Ritchard
- Cesar Romero
- Gena Rowlands
- Penny Santon
- Cosmo Sardo
- Joseph Schildkraut
- George Selk
- William Shatner
- Roy N. Sickner
- Jean Stapleton
- William Swan
- Gloria Swanson
- Kelly Thordsen
- Rip Torn
- Jack Tornek
- Arthur Tovey
- Paul Trinka
- Diane Varsi
- Lesley Ann Warren
- Sam Waterston
- Mary Webster
- Dennis Weaver
- Elen Willard
- Wilson Wood
- Joan Young
- Robert Young

== Reception ==
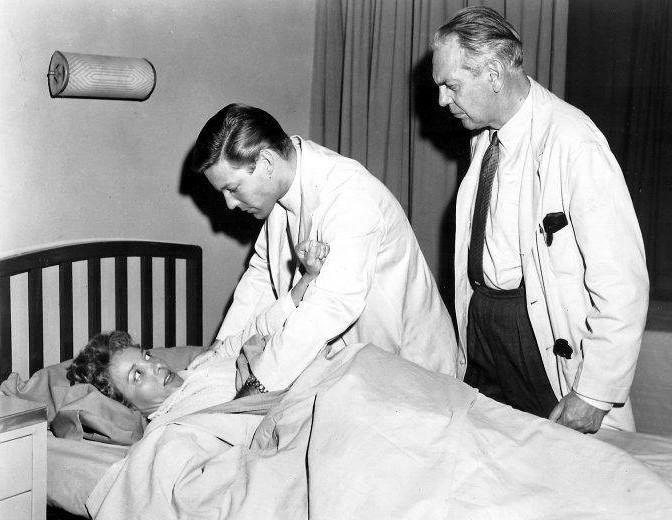
Beverly Garland, Richard Chamberlain and Raymond Massey in the first episode of Dr. Kildare (1961)

The series quickly became a top ten hit in its first season and remained in the top 20 during its second and third seasons, drawing as many as 12,000 fan letters each week. Its success spawned a number of merchandising tie-ins featuring the likeness or endorsement of Chamberlain as Kildare, including novels, comics, toys and games, candy bars, and records of Chamberlain singing songs featured on the show. Chamberlain had a hit single, "Theme from Dr. Kildare (Three Stars Will Shine Tonight)," in which he sang romantic lyrics set to the music from the show's familiar opening theme. Largely as a result of the show, Chamberlain became a teen idol during the 1960s.

The show's influence was so great that viewers would sometimes write to Chamberlain asking "Dr. Kildare" for medical advice. According to Mort Fleischmann, a former promotions executive for NBC, at one point the network promoted the show by having "Dr. Kildare" paged as if he were a real doctor on the public announcement system in airports, train stations, and bus stations across the United States.

In the later seasons of the series, a decline in ratings (possibly coupled with a high asking price for sponsor advertisements) led to the series' cancellation in 1966. Despite its cancellation, the Dr. Kildare series continued to influence many later television medical dramas.

== Home media ==
Warner Bros. has released all five seasons on DVD-R in Region 1 via their Warner Archive Collection. These are Manufacture-on-Demand (MOD) releases, available via WBShop.com & Amazon.com.

| DVD name | Ep # | Release date |
|---|---|---|
| The Complete First Season | 33 | April 16, 2013 |
| The Complete Second Season | 34 | January 28, 2014 |
| The Complete Third Season | 34 | June 3, 2014 |
| The Complete Fourth Season | 32 | April 28, 2015 |
| The Complete Fifth Season | 58 | March 8, 2016 |

The unaired 1960 pilot episode starring Lew Ayres was also released on DVD by Warners as an extra included with the DVD release of their "Dr. Kildare Movie Collection" (compiling all the MGM Kildare films) via Warner Archive Collection in 2014.

The DVD release of "Dr. Kildare: The Complete First Season" included, as an extra, the original never-aired pilot episode for the 1962 psychiatric medical drama series The Eleventh Hour, in which Dr. Kildare (Chamberlain) and Dr. Gillespie (Massey) appear assisting "Dr. Theodore Bassett" (a psychiatrist character played by Wendell Corey) in diagnosing patient Ann Costigan (played by guest star Vera Miles). The episode was initially meant to air as an episode of Dr. Kildare, but was instead reworked to cut out Chamberlain and Massey's parts and remove all Kildare and Gillespie references before airing on October 3, 1962, as the debut episode of The Eleventh Hour TV series, entitled "Ann Costigan: A Duel on a Field of White".

== Music ==
The series theme was composed by Jerry Goldsmith (credited here as Jerrald Goldsmith). In 2009, Film Score Monthly released a three-disc set of original music from the series, featuring Goldsmith's theme and his scores for the pilot and four season one episodes, plus further scores by Harry Sukman (the series' most frequent composer), Richard Markowitz, Morton Stevens, Lalo Schifrin and John Green. (Stevens' represented work includes his music for the three-part "Rome Will Never Leave You", which incorporates an original song composed by Burt Bacharach.) The album also includes music from the original unaired 1960 pilot adapted by Alexander Courage from Bronislau Kaper's theme for The Power and the Prize, and Richard Chamberlain's recording of "Three Stars Will Shine Tonight".

== Related series ==
A second television series, titled Young Dr. Kildare, premiered in first-run syndication in 1972. Starring Mark Jenkins as Dr. Kildare and Gary Merrill as Dr. Gillespie, it lasted for only one season of 24 episodes.

== See also ==
- List of Dr. Kildare episodes
