= Hot Rod Girl =

1956 film by Leslie H. Martinson

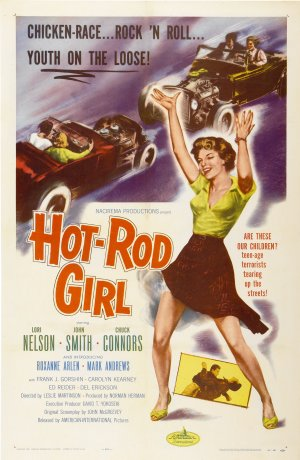
- Directed by: Leslie H. Martinson
- Written by: John McGreevy
- Produced by: Norman T. Herman
- Starring: Lori Nelson; Chuck Connors; John Smith
- Cinematography: Sam Leavitt
- Music by: Alexander Courage
- Production company: Nacirema Productions
- Distributed by: American International Pictures
- Release date: July 1956
- Running time: 79 min.
- Country: United States
- Language: English

Hot Rod Girl is an independent, black-and-white 1956 teen-oriented action film produced by Norman T. Herman, directed by Leslie H. Martinson and released by American International Pictures as a double feature with Girls in Prison. Hot Rod Girl stars Lori Nelson, Chuck Connors and John Smith. The film centers on efforts to keep hot-rodding teenagers from dangerous drag racing on city streets and having them move to the safety of a specialized drag strip, and the consequences when an aggressive newcomer to town goads them into street racing again.

== Plot ==
Carolyn Kearney, Frank Gorshin, and Lori Nelson (1956), in Hot Rod Girl

To combat the problem of teenagers drag-racing their hot rods on city streets, sympathetic Lt. Ben Merril (Connors) has set up a dragstrip for them where they can race under controlled, safe conditions. But after a race meet, Steve Northrup (Del Erickson) is goaded into a street race, while his brother Jeff (Smith) is a passenger. Steve ignores Jeff's entreaties to not race. Steve is killed in the ensuing crash and a heartbroken Jeff breaks off all contact with the other drag-racing kids. He also avoids Lisa Vernon (Nelson), his girlfriend, who is also a drag racer.

A biker jacket-wearing bully named Bronc Talbott (Mark Andrews) arrives in town and after terrorizing the teens, appoints himself leader of them, replacing Jeff in that role. Following an argument at the teens' hangout, a diner run by Yo-Yo (Fred Essler), Bronc challenges Flat Top (Frank Gorshin) to a chicken race, in which they'll accelerate their cars straight at each other until one loses his nerve, swerves and becomes the "chicken". Although he's clearly frightened, an angry Flat Top agrees. During the race, Flat Top swerves at the last second. Bronc is cockier than ever after winning, but Flat Top has realized that chicken-racing is insanely dangerous and tells his girlfriend Judy (Carolyn Kearney) that he was stupid and promises to remain "a coward" for the rest of his life.

Ben is meanwhile trying to find a way to run Bronc out of town. Under the threat of arrest, he forces Bronc to take his car to the dragstrip for that day's races. Jeff is safety inspector for the dragstrip and after discovering several serious problems with Bronc's car, refuses to clear him to race. Bronc vows revenge.

Jeff and Lisa reunite and go for a quiet drive on the local winding mountain roads. Bronc shows up, driving around corners on the wrong side of the road, passing Jeff and slowing down, forcing Jeff to overtake him. Lisa and Jeff decide to speed away from Bronc. But then a boy on a bicycle comes coasting down a hill. Both Jeff and Bronc take evasive action, but the boy is struck by one of the cars and killed. Ben doesn't know which car hit the boy. Lisa and Jeff don't know either because they were knocked out in the crash. Bronc swears to Ben that Jeff hit the kid and with no other witnesses, Ben arrests Jeff.

Ben is suspended from the police force by Capt. Logan (Russell Thorson) following a public outcry about the crash. But Ben continues his own investigation. Suspicious that Bronc is to blame, he takes scrapings of bicycle paint from Bronc's car, proving that it was Bronc who hit the boy, At Yo-Yo's, Ben confronts Bronc. Bronc smashes a soda bottle on Ben's head, knocking him unconscious in an attempt to escape. Just as this happens, Jeff and Lisa come in. Jeff and Bronc have a fistfight and Jeff knocks Bronc to the floor, dazing him. Bronc lands right next to Ben, who revives and arrests Bronc on a charge of manslaughter.

== Cast ==
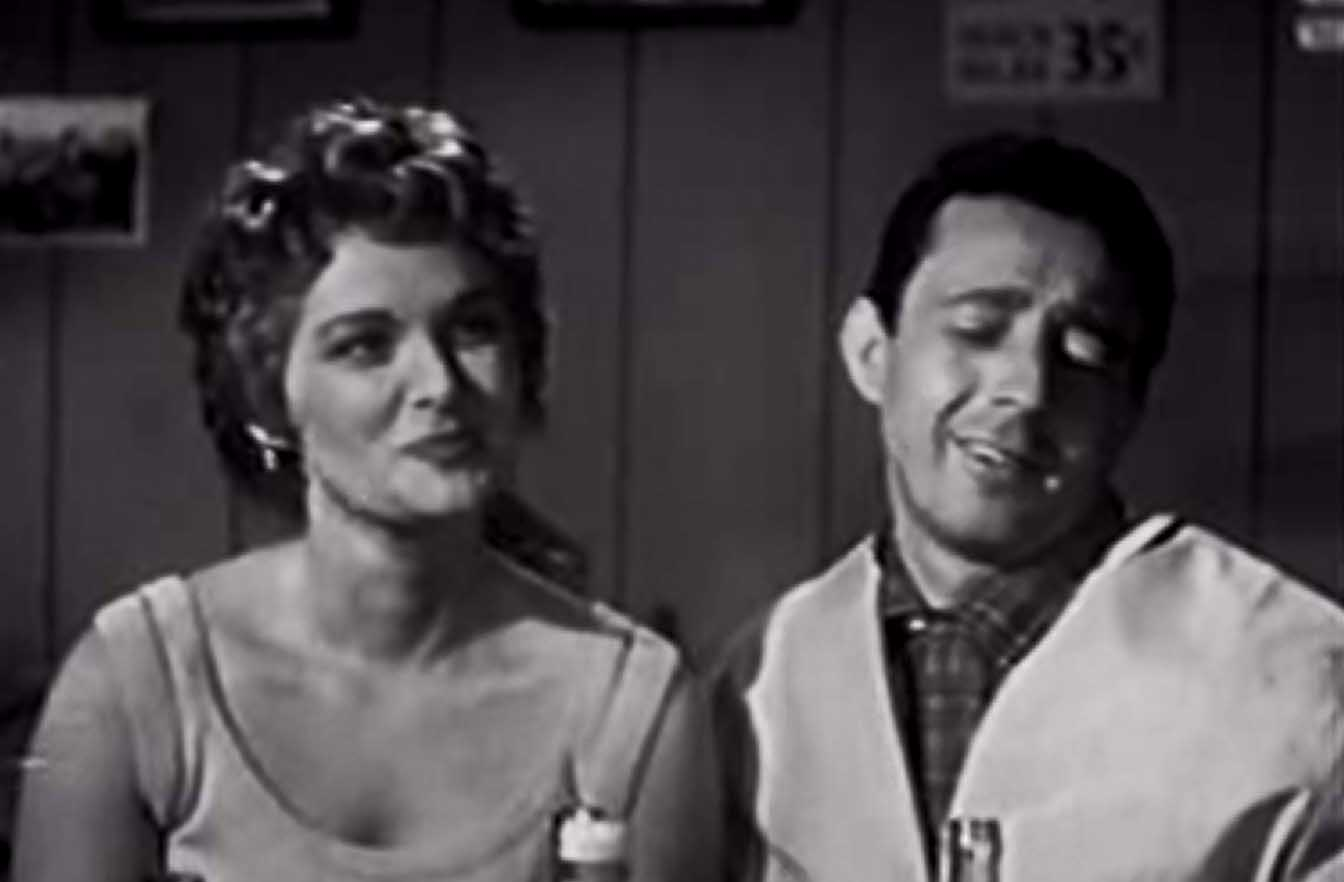
Roxanne Arlen and Eddie Ryder (1956), in Hot Rod Girl

- Lori Nelson as Lisa Vernon
- Chuck Connors as Det. Ben Merrill
- John Smith as Jeff Northrup
- Mark Andrews as Bronc Talbott
- Roxanne Arlen as L.P.
- Frank Gorshin as Flat Top
- Fred Essler as Yo-Yo
- Carolyn Kearney as Judy
- Eddie Ryder as Two Tanks
- Del Erickson as Steve Northrup
- Russell Thorson as Capt. Logan (credited as Russ Logan)
- Dabbs Greer as Henry Frye

== Production ==
Production of Hot Rod Girl began on 20 March 1956. Shooting locations were Hancock Park in Los Angeles, Larchmont Village and San Fernando, California, which was at the time the site of the San Fernando Drag Strip seen in the film. The San Fernando Drag Strip was quite new when Hot Rod Girl was filmed there, having opened in 1955. It closed in 1970.

Roxanne Arlen's and Mark Andrews's names appear in the credits as "introducing" them, although both actors had roles in earlier films. It is, however, the first film of Frank Gorshin.

== Distribution ==
Hot Rod Girl was distributed by American International Pictures (AIP) in the US with an official release date of 15 July 1956. According to TCM, an article in the 13 September 1956 issue of The Hollywood Reporter says that the film had gross receipts of $600,000 by that date from theatres in "fifteen key cities."

A contemporary US theatrical poster for Hot Rod Girl reads "CHICKEN-RACE ... ROCK 'N ROLL ... YOUTH ON THE LOOSE!" and "ARE THESE OUR CHILDREN? teen-age terrorists tearing up the streets!"

The movie was distributed in the UK by Anglo Amalgamated. Although unspecified cuts were made to the film, it was granted a U-certification by the British Board of Film Censors (BBFC) on 24 June 1956. The U-cert allowed the film to be exhibited to audiences of all ages.

== Reception ==
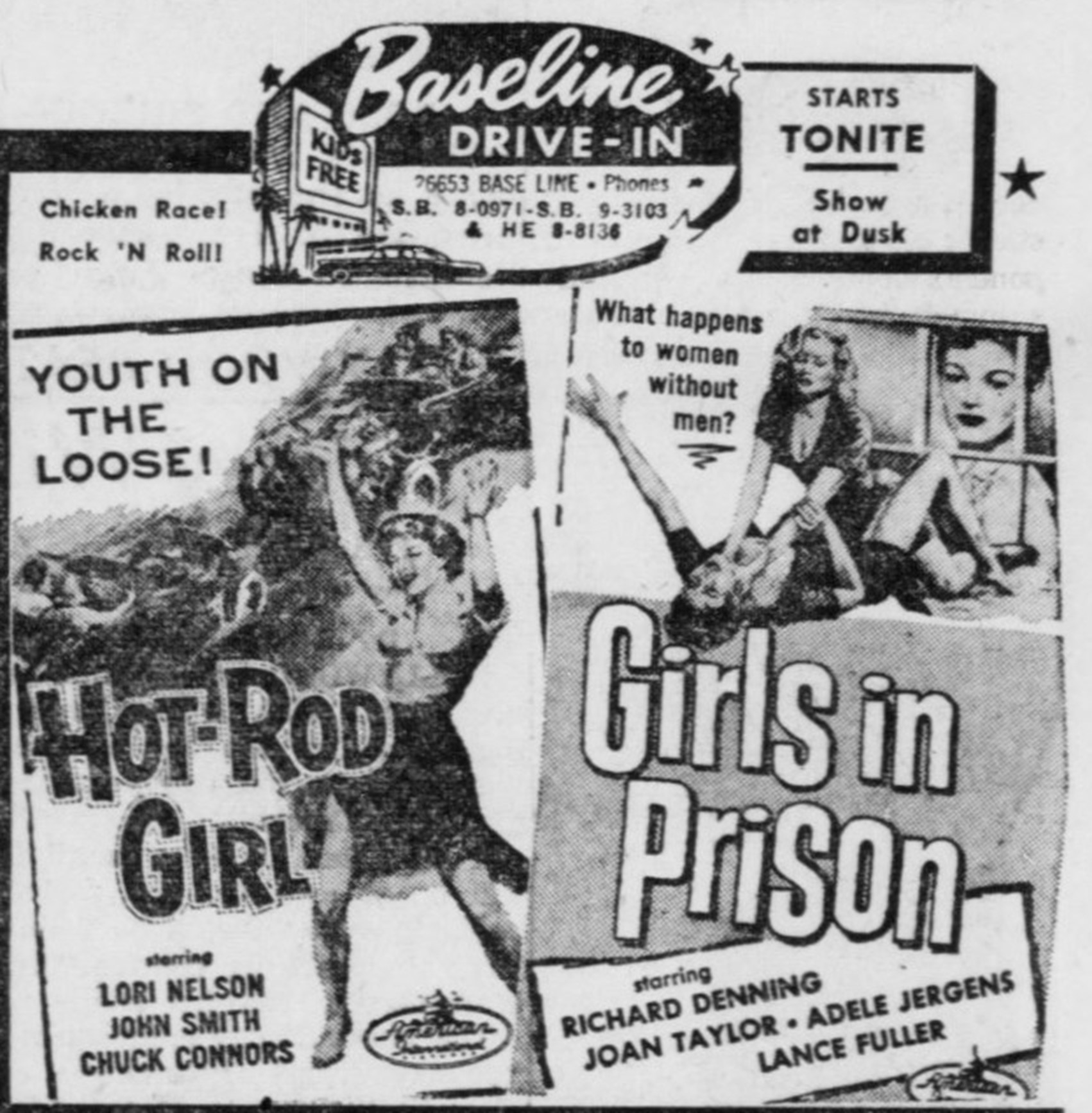
Drive-in advertisement from 1956 for Hot Rod Girl and co-feature, Girls in Prison.

Several authors note the historical context of Hot Rod Girl and similar films. One writes, "America's car culture came into its own in the 1950s when the Interstate highways were built, Detroit boomed and high school shop classes trained auto mechanics. The decade also saw the rise of disaffected youth whose need for speed was expressed in films like Hot Rod Girl (1956), Hot Rod Rumble (1957), and Hot Rod Gang (1958)." Such films, frequently distributed by AIP, "featured large doses of sex, violence, hot rods, drag races, and rock and roll." But "the drag-racing premise proved lucrative if short-lived" as it passed from favour with the release of "Filmgroup's The Wild Ride in June 1960 and the ultra-low-budget Arch Hall production The Choppers (released in November 1961 but produced two years earlier."

BoxOffice reviewed the film in its issue of 8 August 1956. The anonymous reviewer wrote, "As a job of picture making, it is woefully weak, and that concerns scripting, production values and acting," but went on to say that "apparently, the film is enjoying surprisingly impressive patronage in the few situations where it has had pre-release runs." Later, in the 11 May 1957 issue, the magazine summarized that ratings of other publications, using its five-point "very good" to "very poor" scale. BoxOffice itself called the film "fair," as did Harrison's Reports and The Hollywood Reporter, while Variety liked Hot Rod Girl a bit better and rated it as "good."

Academic film historian Thomas Doherty sees Hot Rod Girl as essentially conservative, "a road sign for restraint and caution" where "drag racing off the strip is dangerous, dumb, and unnerving, while on the strip it is safe, smart, and predictable." He notes that even though "a clearly terrified" Flat Top accepts the challenge of a chicken race from the "maniacal Bronc," when he faces "Bronc's relentlessly on-coming car, Flat Top ditches - he chickens out. His cowardice is portrayed as preferable to the insanity of his antagonist, who had no plans of turning off, whatever the consequences." "Nothing in the film," Doherty writes, "gives the lie to the safety-first dialogue."
Somewhat less seriously, Hal Erickson, in his synopsis on allmovie, calls the film "a whole lot less exploitational than its title," while reviewer Laydback at The Grindhouse Cinema Database writes that since Lisa doesn't do "anything except help pressure" boyfriend Jeff to get back into the hot rod scene, viewers shouldn't "go into this one expecting some 'Hot Rod Girl' kicking some ass (as I was led to believe)."

The film was screened as part of the Los Angeles Film Festival in 2009. The festival, subtitled "Hot Rods and Fast Times," showed Hot Rod Girl, Hot Rods to Hell (1967) and Hi-Riders (1978) on three consecutive nights. Critic Nick Pinkerton refers to the teens in Hot Rod Girl as "misunderstood but essentially good kids" who are, however, "strictly squaresville."

== Soundtrack ==
Hot Rod Girl "was the first car flick to marry music with the exhaust note" and in scenes in Yo-Yo's diner "the gang snaps their fingers to bebop, not rock music. But soon other filmmakers "were cashing in on the fad" of films about "the rampant juvenile delinquency problems that fueled hot rod culture in the U.S." In terms of music, although "the spirit of youthful rebellion is still there (...) few if any of these films warranted a soundtrack release."

Original music for Hot Rod Girl is by TV composer Alexander Courage. The music was performed by "noted jazz musicians," including saxophonist Bud Shank and trumpet player Maynard Ferguson.

== See also ==
- List of American films of 1956
