= Fred Essler =

Hungarian-American actor (1895–1973)

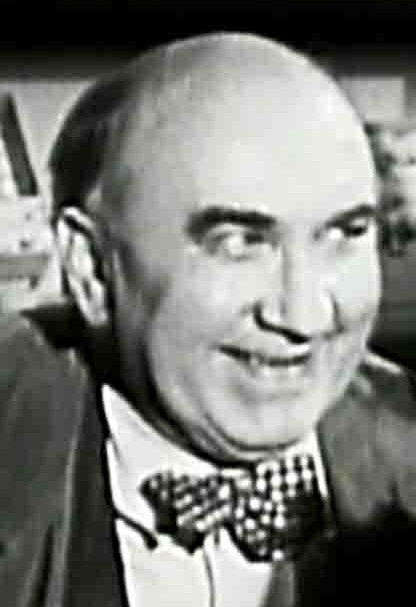
- Essler in The Admiral Was a Lady (1950)
- Born: Fritz Essler; 13 February 1895; Vienna, Austria-Hungary (now Austria)
- Died: 17 January 1973 (aged 77); Woodland Hills, California, U.S.
- Occupation: Actor
- Years active: 1943–1966

Fred Essler (born Fritz Essler; 13 February 1895 – 17 January 1973) was an American actor. He worked film, television and on stage.

He was born Fritz Essler, on 13 February 1895 in Vienna, Austria-Hungary, (now Austria); and, died on, 17 January 1973 in Woodland Hills, California.

== Selected filmography ==
The following is a partial list of his film work: Some of the trailers for the movies are also available for viewing on-line.

- The Money Trap (1966), Mr. Klein
- The Unsinkable Molly Brown (1964), Baron Karl Ludwig von Ettenburg
- G.I. Blues (1960) Papa Mueller
- My Man Godfrey (1957), Captain
- My Gun Is Quick (1957), Ludwig Teller
- Hot Rod Girl (1956), Yo-Yo
- The Benny Goodman Story (1956), Professor Schoepp
- The First Traveling Saleslady (1956) Martin Schlessinger
- The Girl in the Red Velvet Swing (1955), Leopold Borner (uncredited)
- Conquest of Space (1955), Assistant Station Announcer (uncredited)

Fred Essler and Lori Nelson (1956), in Hot Rod Girl

- Houdini (1953), Officious Man (uncredited)
- The Admiral Was a Lady (1950), Benny
- The White Tower (1950), Knubel
- Every Girl Should Be Married (1948), Pierre
- Messenger of Peace (1947), Hans Dacher
- Faithful in My Fashion (1946), Nikolai
- Scarlet Street (1946), Marchetti (uncredited)
- The Song of Bernadette (1943), Minister of Justice (uncredited)

== Selected Television Credits ==
The following is a partial list of his television work:

- I'm Dickens, He's Fenster; Is There a Doctor in the House? (1963), Dr. Leipsig
- The Dick Powell Show; The Rage of Silence (1963) … Mr. Potovsky
- 77 Sunset Strip; The Catspaw Caper (1962); Papa E; The Reluctant Spy (1962), Max
- Cheyenne; Man Alone (1962), Carl Turner
- Mister Ed; The Contest (1962), Mr. Schultz
- Pete and Gladys; The Great Stone Face (1961), Otto Inglehoffer
- Stagecoach West; Three Wise Men (1960), Adolph Strauss
- Perry Mason; The Case of the Nine Dolls (1960), Mr. Kringle
- Peter Gunn; The Dummy (1960), Mr. Ulrich
- Alfred Hitchcock Presents (1959) (Season 4 Episode 26: "Cheap Is Cheap") as Arthur
- Maverick; Game of Chance (1959), Jeweller
- Shirley Temple's Storybook; The Legend of Sleepy Hollow (1958), Baltus Van Tassel
- My Little Margie; Switzerland Story (1954)
- The Adventures of Falcon; A Drug on the Market (1954), Adolph Beimer
- The Lone Ranger; Trouble in Town (1953), Otto Heindorf
- Adventures of Superman; The Monkey Mystery (1952), Scientist Jan Moleska (uncredited)
- Sky King; Formula for Fear (1952), Dr. Roy Urban
- Dangerous Assignment; The Black Hood Story (1952), Poppa Schlager
- Racket Squad (1951-2), Karl Muller
- The Stu Erwin Show (1951)

== Stage ==
From Vienna, 1939, Original Cast, Musical Revue
