= The Admiral Was a Lady =

1950 film by Albert S. Rogell

- Film poster
- Directed by: Albert S. Rogell
- Produced by: Edward Lewis (associate producer); Albert S. Rogell (producer); Jack M. Warner
- Starring: Edmond O'Brien; Wanda Hendrix; Rudy Vallée
- Cinematography: Stanley Cortez
- Edited by: William H. Ziegler
- Music by: Edward J. Kay
- Production company: Roxbury Productions
- Distributed by: United Artists
- Release dates: August 3, 1950 (Los Angeles); October 12, 1950 (New York)
- Running time: 87 minutes
- Country: United States
- Language: English

The Admiral Was a Lady is a 1950 American comedy film directed by Albert S. Rogell and starring Edmond O'Brien, Rudy Vallée and Wanda Hendrix. It was an independent production distributed by United Artists. The working title of the film was Once Over Lightly, taken from one of the film's songs.

== Plot ==
After the end of World War II, Jean Madison, a former WAVE ensign, meets the former aircrew of an Army Air Corps A-20 Havoc light bomber named "Sinful Sinthia" when they go to collect their unemployment benefits. They are all members of the 52-20 Club, a government program that pays unemployed veterans $20 a week for 52 weeks.

The men take Jean, whom Jimmy dubs the Admiral, under their wing, showing her how to save money. For example, they open bank accounts in order to receive a free ceramic piggy bank and have their $20 checks cashed, then close their accounts without having to pay a fee. They sell the piggy banks to a pawnbroker for 25 cents each. The gang lives free in an empty aircraft factory because Jimmy is the night watchman. Eddie artfully makes their furniture out of aircraft parts and other war surplus. They get their meals discounted for being stale or in trade, as when Mike substitutes for the lifeguard at a private club. Former taxi driver Ollie drives them around in a sound truck from a local music store in exchange for providing advertising over a loudspeaker.

Jean is secretly followed by a private detective. When she learns that her fiancé Henry is returning to the United States but has not mentioned it to her, she becomes upset and boards a bus for home.

Jimmy is summoned to the office of Peter Pedigrew, the "Jukebox King", who had hired the private detective. He threatens to put the men to work, ending their idyllic lifestyle, unless they keep Jean from leaving for 24 hours. Pedigrew later explains that his ex-wife Shirley intends to marry Henry. Pedigrew wants to remarry Shirley because, after two expensive divorces, she has most of his money, and he desperately needs capital to expand his business. Also, he is still irresistibly attracted to her although she is "so beautifully wicked". He wants the crew to help reunite Henry and Jean, and Jimmy reluctantly agrees.

Jimmy races to the bus and convinces Jean to stay by lying to her about Henry. As they spend time together, Jean discovers that the men are living with a dark secret. Jimmy feels guilty for Mike's injuries when their airplane crashed during the war. Jimmy, the former head of an employment agency, will not rest until all of his crewmen have resolved things. Jimmy even takes Mike's place in a boxing match, since the injuries could kill Mike, although Jimmy has never been inside a ring.

Pedigrew connects with Shirley, Henry comes for Jean and Eddie realizes that he needs to return home to determine whether his girlfriend will love him even if he is poor. Finally, Pedigrew agrees to start Mike and Ollie in business. Jimmy is in love with the Admiral. When the unseen Henry finally knocks on her door, she leaves it locked in favor of Jimmy.

== Cast ==
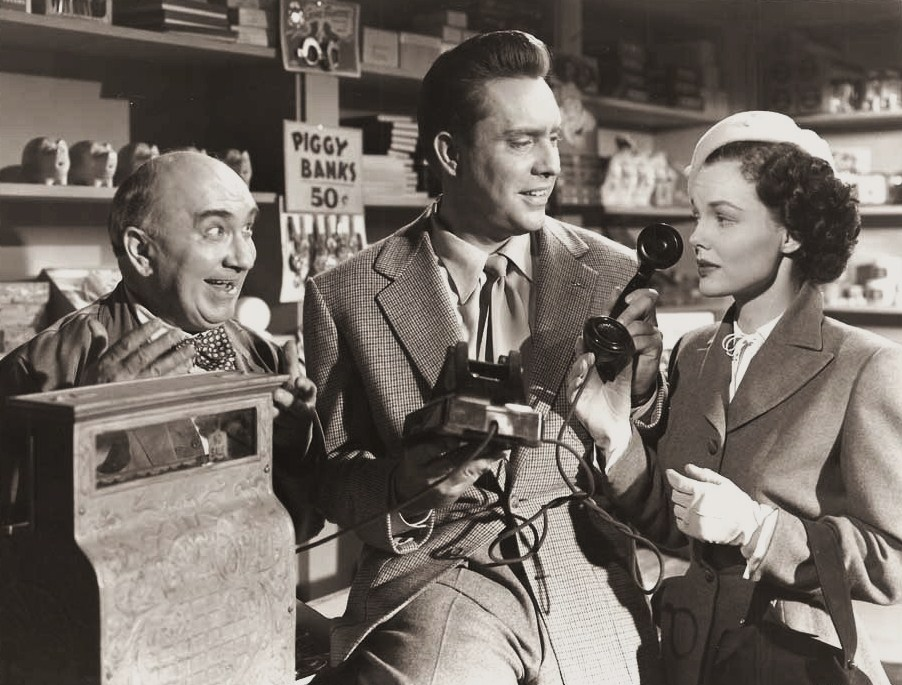
Fred Essler, Edmond O'Brien and Wanda Hendrix in The Admiral Was a Lady

- Edmond O'Brien as Jimmy Stevens
- Wanda Hendrix as Jean Madison, the "Admiral"
- Rudy Vallee as Peter Pedigrew
- Johnny Sands as Eddie Hoff
- Steve Brodie as Mike O'Halloran, the boxer
- Richard Erdman as Oliver "Ollie" Bonelli
- Hillary Brooke as Mrs. Shirley Pedigrew
- Richard Lane as Marty Gruber, the fight promoter
- Garry Owen as Watson Jones, the private detective
- Fred Essler as Benny, the pawnbroker
- Ralph Dunn as Mr. Bimble

== Music ==
"Once Over Lightly" and "Everything That's Wonderful" were composed by Al Stewart and Earl Rose.

== Reception ==
In a contemporary review for The New York Times, critic A. H. Weiler wrote: "Since it obviously was intended as a light variant of the what-happens-after-boy-meets-girl theme, 'The Admiral Was a Lady' can be listed as meeting specifications. It is light. But the ... comedy, which occasionally tries to take itself seriously, is entangled in enough plot skeins to suit several such anticts. And, the cast, which is in there pitching with a will, generates surprisingly few loud laughs for the prodigious amount of energy expended. ... And Mr. O'Brien, genial and ebullient, disproves his contention that he 'can't afford to work.' It's too bad he isn't working on something more substantial though."

Reviewer John L. Scott of the Los Angeles Times wrote: "'The Admiral Was a Lady' ... is, for three-quarters of its running time. a lightweight, moderately amusing comedy. Then it turns serious. The result is a dull thud that echoes. ... The plot is complicated and spreads out in several directions. ... I won't disclose the ending but it's not hard to guess."

== Home media ==
The film is in the public domain and widely available on DVD or online, with running times ranging between 83 and 87 minutes.
