= Roxanne Arlen =

American actress and model (1931–1989)

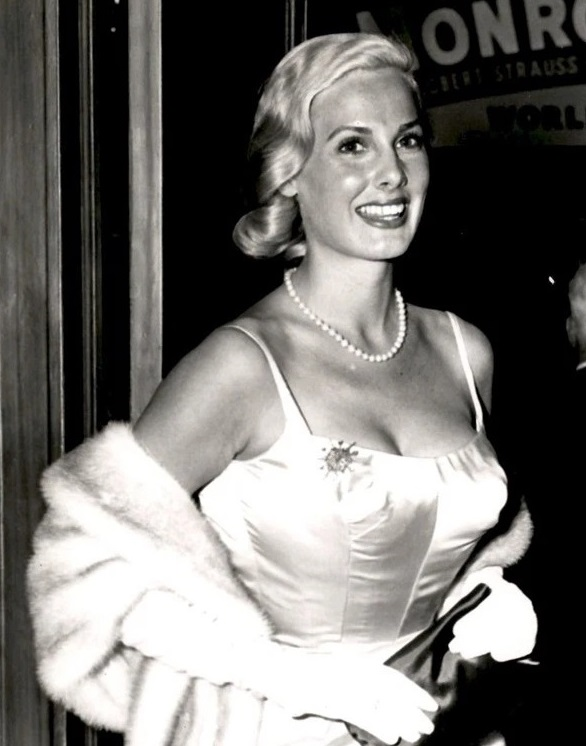
- Arlen in 1955
- Born: Roxanne Giles; January 10, 1931; Detroit, Michigan, U.S.
- Died: February 22, 1989 (aged 58); London, England
- Occupations: Actress, model
- Years active: 1955–1965
- Spouses: Red Buttons (m. 1947; div. 1949) Milton Gilman (m. 1949; div. 1954) Tom Roddy (m. 1954; div. 1957) Bill Schaffer (m. 1969)
- Children: 1

Roxanne Arlen (born Roxanne Giles; January 10, 1931 – February 22, 1989) was an American film and stage actress and model active in the 1950s and 1960s.

== Early years ==
Roxanne Arlen was born Roxanne Giles on January 10, 1931, in Detroit, Michigan. Her father, Harry Giles, was a chemist based in Detroit.

Arlen graduated from Highland Park High School at the age of 16. While still in high school, she began taking evening drama classes at Wayne State University. Her acting career was launched after she won a modeling contest held at the Fox Theater in Detroit.

== Career ==
She appeared in a number of feature and tevevision films in the 1950s and 1960s. On Broadway, Arlen portrayed Gloria Coogle in Who Was That Lady I Saw You With? (1958). Arlen left show business when she found herself being groomed for a sex-goddess role like that of Marilyn Monroe.

She was a WAMPUS Baby Star in 1955.

== Personal life ==
Arlen was married to Red Buttons from 1947 to 1949, Milton Gilman from 1949 to 1954, and Tom Roddy from 1954 to 1957. All three marriages ended in divorce. She married William Shafer in 1960, and they had a daughter. In the 1970s, she began writing a play.

She died in London, England, on February 22, 1989.

== Filmography ==
=== Feature films ===
- The Loved One (1965) as Wispering Glades hostess
- A House Is Not a Home (1964) as Hattie's girl
- Gypsy (1962) as Electra
- Bachelor Flat (1962) as Mrs. Roberts
- Slim Carter (1957) as Cigarette girl
- The Big Caper (1957) as Doll
- The Young Stranger (1957) as Carhop
- The Best Things in Life Are Free (1956) as Perky Nichols
- Everything but the Truth (1956) as Blonde
- Miracle in the Rain (1956) as Red-headed secretary
- Bundle of Joy (1956) as Blonde
- Hot Rod Girl (1956) as Long Play
- Son of Sinbad (1955) as Raider
- Battle Cry (1955) as Blonde
- Illegal (1955) as Miss Hathaway

=== Television ===
- Alfred Hitchcock Presents (1956) (Season 1 Episode 35 "The Legacy") as Donna Dew
- Alfred Hitchcock Presents (1957) (Season 2 Episode 26 "I Killed the Count Part 2") as Miss LaLune
- Colgate Theatre (1958) (Season 1 Episode 1 "Adventures of a Model") as Model
- Perry Mason (CBS-TV series) "The Case of the Moth-Eaten Mink"; Original air date: 12/14/1957 as Mae Nolan.
