= Dabbs Greer =

American actor (1917–2007)

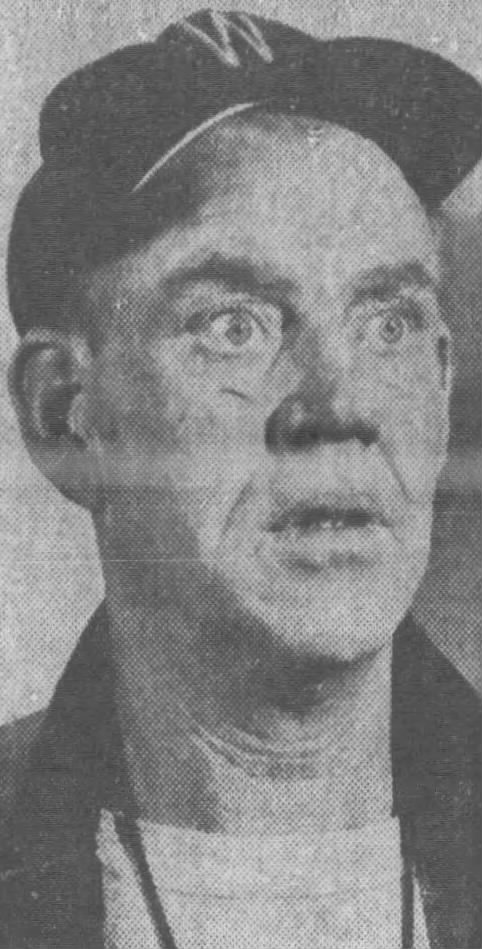
- Greer as Coach Ossie Weiss in Hank, c. 1966
- Born: Robert William Greer; April 2, 1917; Fairview, Missouri, U.S.
- Died: April 28, 2007 (aged 90); Pasadena, California, U.S.
- Resting place: Peace Valley Cemetery McDonald County, Missouri
- Education: Drury University
- Occupation: Actor
- Years active: 1938–2003

Robert William "Dabbs" Greer (April 2, 1917 – April 28, 2007) was an American character actor in film and television for over 60 years. Greer appeared in nearly 100 film roles and in nearly 600 television episodes of various series. He played Mr. Jonas in Gunsmoke, Coach Ossie Weiss in the sitcom Hank, and Reverend Robert Alden in Little House on the Prairie. Greer's final film role was as the 108-year-old Paul Edgecomb, the character played by Tom Hanks in 1999's The Green Mile.

== Early life ==
Greer was born in Fairview, Missouri, the son of Bernice Irene (née Dabbs), a speech teacher, and Randall Alexander Greer, a druggist. When Greer was an infant, the family moved to the larger Anderson, Missouri, 30 miles (48 km) southwest. At the age of eight, he began acting in children's theater productions. He attended Drury University in Springfield, Missouri, where he was a member of Theta Kappa Nu.

== Career ==
=== Early career (1930s and 1940s) ===
Greer's film debut was as an extra in the 1939 film Jesse James, which was filmed mainly around Pineville, Missouri.

After moving to Pasadena, California in 1943, he became an administrator and acting instructor at the Pasadena Playhouse.

=== 1950s ===
Greer appeared in three episodes of Adventures of Superman, including the inaugural entry, "Superman on Earth" (1952), in which he was cast as the first person to be saved by Superman. He was the major guest star as a man framed for murder in "Five Minutes to Doom" (1954) and as an eccentric millionaire in "The Superman Silver Mine" (1958).

Greer made hundreds of appearances in around 200 different television series. He played the role of the marshal in the two-part "King of the Dakotas" (1955) and appeared as Ray in "Paper Gunman" of the NBC Western anthology series Frontier. In the 1956 movie Hot Rod Girl, he played the auto-repair shop owner, Mr. Fry. In 1957, he appeared in the episode "Revenge" on the syndicated crime drama The Sheriff of Cochise and as Sanders in the episode "My Horse Ajax" on NBC's children's Western series Fury. About this time, he guest-starred on the syndicated adventure series Whirlybirds and Rescue 8. He also appeared in an episode of Richard Diamond, Private Detective. Greer was cast on the syndicated Western series Pony Express and also guest-starred on three CBS Western series: Wanted: Dead or Alive, Trackdown, and Johnny Ringo. Thereafter, he appeared in the NBC Modern Western series Empire and guest-starred on Stoney Burke.

Greer appeared on ABC's Tombstone Territory (in the 1957 episode "Ambush at Gila Gulch"), and in the 1957 episode "Rebel Christmas" on the Tod Andrews syndicated series The Gray Ghost. He was then cast as Ed Grimes on the 1958 episode "312 Vertical" of the syndicated series State Trooper. He also appeared in It! The Terror from Beyond Space (1958). His other appearances in 1959 include the episode "Peligroso" on NBC's Western series The Restless Gun, episodes of Bat Masterson, and the syndicated Man Without a Gun. From 1956 until 1974, Greer had a recurring role as storekeeper Mr. Jonas on the long-running TV series Gunsmoke. He appeared in 42 episodes of the series. Occasionally, he would play someone other than Mr. Jonas. In one episode, he was Chester's uncle.

=== 1960s ===
In 1960, Greer appeared in the episode "Dark Fear" on the CBS anthology series The DuPont Show with June Allyson. He was cast twice in The Twilight Zone, in the 1962 episode "Hocus-Pocus and Frisby" and the 1963 episode "Valley of the Shadow". Also in 1963, he was cast in a segment on Jack Palance's ABC circus drama The Greatest Show on Earth. He then appeared as a policeman in the first episode of The Fugitive, "Fear in a Desert City". He would return for five more episodes, making him the most frequently cast guest actor of non-recurring roles on the series (tied with Richard Anderson).

The 1960s brought Greer several more recurring roles in popular series, such as track coach Ossie Weiss in Hank, and Sheriff Norris "Norrie" Coolidge in The Ghost & Mrs. Muir. He also made eight appearances on The Rifleman. In 1962, on the ABC/WB Western series Lawman, in an episode titled "The Unmasked", Greer was cast in a fictitious portrayal of Boston Corbett, the Union Army soldier who shot and mortally wounded Abraham Lincoln's assassin, John Wilkes Booth.

In 1969, Greer played the minister who married Carol and Mike Brady on the pilot episode of The Brady Bunch.

=== 1970s and 1980s ===
Greer had a recurring role in the NBC series Little House on the Prairie from 1974 to 1983 as Reverend Alden. Often cast as a minister, he performed the marriages of Rob and Laura Petrie on The Dick Van Dyke Show and Mike and Carol Brady on the first episode of The Brady Bunch.

=== Last years (1990s and 2000s) ===
From 1992 to 1996, he tended to the spiritual needs of the townsfolk in fictional Rome, Wisconsin, as Reverend Henry Novotny in Picket Fences. He also had a guest appearance on an episode of Charles in Charge in the role of Buzz Powell.

In the May 9, 1991, episode of L.A. Law, titled "On the Toad Again", Greer played a character addicted to a "high" produced by licking the skin secretions of psychoactive toads. In the 1997 film Con Air, Greer appeared as an old man discovered hiding under a pick-up truck at "Lerner Field".

Greer's final feature film was a prominent role as 108-year-old Paul Edgecomb in The Green Mile (1999) starring Tom Hanks as the younger Edgecomb. Greer's last television performance was in a 2003 episode of Lizzie McGuire.

Most of Greer's approximately 700 movie and television appearances had been in supporting roles, but he told the Albany Times Union in an interview in 2000, that "every character actor, in their little sphere, is the lead."

== Death ==
Greer died on April 28, 2007, at Huntington Hospital in Pasadena from kidney failure and heart disease. He is interred in Peace Valley Cemetery in McDonald County, Missouri.

== Filmography ==
=== Film ===
Year	Title	Role	Notes
1949	Reign of Terror	Bridge Guard	Uncredited
1950	The Damned Don't Cry	Reporter	Uncredited
1950	Trial Without Jury	Jack, Police Radio Room Dispatcher	Uncredited
1950	Devil's Doorway	Spud Keith	Uncredited
1950	California Passage	Dealer	Uncredited
1951	Storm Warning	Courtroom Cop	Uncredited
1951	Call Me Mister	Corporal Aide to Colonel	Uncredited
1951	Father's Little Dividend	Green Taxicab's Driver	Uncredited
1951	The Lady from Texas	Bailiff	Uncredited
1951	The Unknown Man	Ambulance Intern Driver	Uncredited
1951	Two Tickets to Broadway	Soldier in Nightclub	Uncredited
1951	Week-End with Father	Minor Role	Uncredited
1951	Under the Gun	Stoner	Uncredited
1952	Room for One More	Scoutmaster	Uncredited
1952	Deadline – U.S.A.	Day Reporter	Uncredited
1952	Young Man with Ideas	Telephone Man	Uncredited
1952	Diplomatic Courier	Intelligence Clerk	Uncredited
1952	Scarlet Angel	Man Robbed by Roxy	Uncredited
1952	We're Not Married!	Beauty Contest Spectator	Uncredited
1952	Sally and Saint Anne	Mr. Parker	Uncredited
1952	Monkey Business	Cabbie	Uncredited
1952	My Man and I	Court Clerk	Uncredited
1952	Because You're Mine	Sergeant	Uncredited
1952	Because of You	Mexican Shop Owner	Uncredited
1952	Million Dollar Mermaid	Movie Set Engineer	Uncredited
1952	The Bad and the Beautiful	Studio Lighting Technician	Uncredited
1952	Above and Beyond	Steve Haddock	Uncredited
1952	She Couldn't Say No	Dick Jordan	Uncredited
1953	Trouble Along the Way	Father Peterson	
1953	House of Wax	Sergeant Jim Shane	
1953	Julius Caesar	Citizen of Rome	Uncredited
1953	Remains to Be Seen	Julius	Uncredited
1953	Dream Wife	Night Elevator Operator	Uncredited
1953	A Slight Case of Larceny	Eddie - 1st Gas Man	Uncredited
1953	Affair with a Stranger	Happy Murray	
1953	Mister Scoutmaster	Fireman	Uncredited
1953	Mission Over Korea	Pilot	Uncredited
1953	Half a Hero	George Payson	
1953	China Venture	Galuppo	
1953	Take the High Ground!	Shorty	Uncredited
1954	Riot in Cell Block 11	Schuyler	
1954	Bitter Creek	Sheriff	
1954	Rose Marie	Charity Dance Cashier	Uncredited
1954	Lucky Me	Eddie Szczepanski	Uncredited
1954	The Desperado	U.S. Marshal Jim Langley	
1954	Living It Up	Head Boy Ranger	Uncredited
1954	Private Hell 36	Sam Marvin, Bartender	
1955	Seven Angry Men	Doctor	
1955	Hit the Deck	Eddie	Uncredited
1955	Stranger on Horseback	Hotel Clerk	Uncredited
1955	An Annapolis Story	Commander Halleck	Uncredited
1955	The Seven Little Foys	Tutor	Uncredited
1955	Foxfire	Bus Driver	Uncredited
1955	The Scarlet Coat	Captain Brewster	Uncredited
1955	The McConnell Story	Pilot Instructor	Uncredited
1955	At Gunpoint	Preacher at Funeral	Uncredited
1956	Meet Me in Las Vegas	Mr. Smith-Johnson	Uncredited
1956	D-Day the Sixth of June	Corporal Atkinson	Uncredited
1956	The First Texan	Delegate Potter	Uncredited
1956	Away All Boats	Lieutenant Commander Harrison	Uncredited
1956	The Young Guns	Fred	Uncredited
1956	Tension at Table Rock	Doctor	Uncredited
1956	Hot Rod Girl	Henry Frye	
1956	Invasion of the Body Snatchers	Mac Lomax	
1956	Hot Cars	Detective Davenport	
1957	Chain of Evidence	Dr. Ainsley	
1957	The Spirit of St. Louis	Goldsborough	Uncredited
1957	All Mine to Give	Clendenning	Uncredited
1957	Johnny Tremain	Nat Lorne	Uncredited
1957	The Vampire	Dr. Will Beaumont	
1957	Pawnee	John Brewster	
1957	My Man Godfrey	Lieutenant O'Connor	
1957	Young and Dangerous	Mr. John Clinton	
1957	Baby Face Nelson	FBI Agent Charles Bonner	
1958	It! The Terror from Beyond Space	Eric Royce	
1958	I Want to Live!	San Quentin Captain	
1959	Lone Texan	Doc Jansen	
1959	Day of the Outlaw	Doc Langer, Veterinarian	
1959	Edge of Eternity	Gas Station Attendant	
1959	Last Train from Gun Hill	Deputy Andy	Uncredited
1960	Cash McCall	Bronson	Uncredited
1963	Wives and Lovers	Sardi's Waiter	Uncredited
1963	Palm Springs Weekend	Boys' Club Leader	Uncredited
1963	Showdown	Express Man	
1964	Roustabout	Arthur Nielsen	
1965	Shenandoah	Abernathy	
1970	The Cheyenne Social Club	Jedediah W. Willowby	
1972	Rage	Dr. Thompson	
1973	White Lightning	Pa McKlusky	
1977	Evil Town	Lyle Phelps	
1981	Chu Chu and the Philly Flash	Wally	
1988	Two Moon Junction	Kyle	
1989	Sundown: The Vampire in Retreat	Otto	
1990	Pacific Heights	Mr. Thayer	
1992	House IV	Dad	
1994	Little Giants	Wilbur	
1997	Con Air	Man Under Truck	
1999	The Green Mile	Old Paul Edgecomb	Final film role

=== Television ===
Year	Title	Role	Notes
1950	Dick Tracy	Shaky	2 episodes
1950–1954	Fireside Theatre	Various characters	14 episodes
1951	Space Patrol	Paul Marin	Episode: "The Lost City of the Carnacans"
1952	The Doctor	Pierson	Episode: "No Gods to Serve"
1952	The Lone Ranger	Toby Durbin	Episode: "Through the Wall"
1952–1954	Cavalcade of America	Mark Wilson / Johann / John Adams	3 episodes
1952–1955	Big Town	Sergeant Jim Ward	4 episodes
1952–1958	Adventures of Superman	Episode 1- Played 2 people. Mr. Pebbles and Dan Dobey / Episode 2 - Joe Winters / Episode 3 - Man Saved from Dirigible Fall	3 episodes
1953–1955	Big Town	Colonel Venable / Dave / General Charles S. Venable	3 episodes
1954	Waterfront	Phil Harvey	Episode: "Stand by All Stations"
1954	Topper	Jack	Episode: "Preparations for Europe"
1954	The Lone Wolf	Sheriff Ketton	Episode: "The Wife Story"
1954	Climax!	Adams	Episode: "The After House"
1954	Your Favorite Story	Unknown character	Episode: "The Waltz"
1954–1960	Letter to Loretta	Various characters	9 episodes
1954–1965	Lassie	Casey Howell / Joe Baker	3 episodes
1955	Father Knows Best	Mr. Collins	Episode: "Father Delivers the Papers"
1955	The Man Behind the Badge	Detective Merrick	Episode: "The Case of the Capital Crime"
1955	The Life and Legend of Wyatt Earp	Marshal Crawford	Episode: "Wyatt Earp Becomes a Marshal"
1955	Schlitz Playhouse of Stars	Charlie	Episode: "A Gift of Life"
1955	Frontier	Marshal / Ray	2 episodes
1955	General Electric Theater	Tom	Episode: "Prosper's Old Mother"
1955	Navy Log	Mr. Sayres	Episode: "Navy Corpsman"
1955–1956	Science Fiction Theatre	Professor Horst Reimers / MacNamara / Arthur Kern	3 episodes
1955–1956	Lux Video Theatre	Shammy / Maguire	4 episodes
1955–1957	Fireside Theatre	Boggs / Germie / Henry Blaine / Jeremy	2 episodes
1956	The Man Called X	Josef	Episode: "For External Use Only"
1956	The Star and the Story	Dr. Carlson	Episode: "Payment in Kind"
1956	NBC Matinee Theater	Various characters	2 episodes
1956	The Millionaire	Stoolie	Episode: "The Ed Murdock Story"
1956	Alfred Hitchcock Presents	Theodore the Milkman / The Sheriff	Season 1 Episode 25: "There Was an Old Woman" as Theodore the Milkman Season 1 Episode 33: "The Belfry" as the Sheriff
1956	TV Reader's Digest	Captain Larsen / Paul Diamond / Dr. Rayborn / Tad Duncan, Sr. / Dr. Petrie	5 episodes
1956	Chevron Hall of Stars	John	Episode: "Family Affair"
1956	The George Burns and Gracie Allen Show	Dr. J. L. Hendricks / Bert Keith	2 episodes
1956	The Joseph Cotten Show	Mr. Erwin	Episode: "We Who Love Her"
1956	Studio 57	Sheriff Barton	Episode: "Swing Your Partner, Hector"
1956–1961	Dick Powell's Zane Grey Theatre	Various characters	6 episodes
1956–1974	Gunsmoke	Wilbur Jonas (storekeeper) / Joe Bean / Uncle Wesley	43 episodes
1957	The New Adventures of Charlie Chan	Zac West	Episode: "The Lost Face"
1957	How to Marry a Millionaire	Mr. Blandish	3 episodes
1957	Broken Arrow	Joe Randolph	Episode: "Legacy of a Hero"
1957	Dr. Hudson's Secret Journal	Tom Denby / Pete Maxwell	2 episodes
1957	Fury	Sanders	Episode: "My Horse Ajax"
1957	The Sheriff of Cochise	Charlie Jackson	Episode: "Revenge"
1957	The West Point Story	Tom Nolan	2 episodes
1957	Code 3	Louis Johnson / Bill Rockwell	2 episodes
1957	The Web	Unknown character	Episode: "Man with a Choice"
1957	The Gray Ghost	Cooper	Episode: "Rebel Christmas"
1957	Tombstone Territory	Jim Edwards, Sr.	Episode: "Ambush at Gila Gulch"
1957–1958	Whirlybirds	Jim Burdette / Dan Malloy	2 episodes
1957–1958	Trackdown	Mike Kilroy / Sheriff Chet Farrow / Ward Barrett / Ethan Phelps	4 episodes
1958	Official Detective	James	Episode: "The Cover-Up"
1958	The Court of Last Resort	Sheriff Cass Baker	Episode: "The Joel Sheldon Case"
1958	State Trooper	Ed Grimes	Episode: "312 Vertical"
1958	Target	Kirby	Episode: "Backfire"
1958	Studio One	Lewis	Episode: "Image of Fear"
1958	The Restless Gun	Roy Stanton	Episode: "Peligroso"
1958	U.S. Marshal	Joe Burton	Episode: "Needlepoint"
1958–1959	Wanted: Dead or Alive	Bartender / Elder Luke Boone / Tom Wade	3 episodes
1958–1959	Walt Disney Presents	Will / Fort Supplier	2 episodes
1958–1966	Perry Mason	Various characters	8 episodes
1959	Pony Express	Sheriff Barnett	Episode: "Wrong Rope"
1959	Steve Canyon	Ben Moore	Episode: "The Bomb"
1959	Playhouse 90	Clayton Beard	Episode: "The Day Before Atlanta"
1959	The Thin Man	Amboy - Hotel Clerk	Episode: "Anonymity Anyone?"
1959	The Rough Riders	Sheriff Jenkins	Episode: "Paradise Gap"
1959	Alcoa Theatre	Policeman	Episode: "Christabel"
1959	Man Without a Gun	Ben McLaren	Episode: "Hangtree Inn"
1959	The Troubleshooters	Lepage	Episode: "The Law and the Profits"
1959	Tightrope!	Skeet	Episode: "Thousand Dollar Bill"
1959	Bat Masterson	Will	Episode: "Wanted: Dead"
1959	Law of the Plainsman	Wesley	Episode: “The Hostiles”
1959	Richard Diamond, Private Detective	Scooter Jaffee	Episode: "The Adjuster"
1959	The Rifleman	Brett Conway	Episode: "Panic" Marcus Trimble Episode: "Outlaw's Inheritance"
1959	Wichita Town	John Matthews	Episode: "The Devil's Choice"
1959–1960	Black Saddle	Owen Edwards / Denver Pollock	2 episodes
1959–1960	Goodyear Theatre	Matty Burton / Policeman	2 episodes
1959–1965	Wagon Train	Hiram Snow / Mr. Finley / Tanner	3 episodes
1960	Rescue 8	Harvey	Episode: "Quicksand"
1960	Johnny Ringo	Sam	Episode: "Killer, Choose a Card"
1960	The Many Loves of Dobie Gillis	Mr. Walter Gilroy	2 episodes
1960	The DuPont Show with June Allyson	Dr. Meeker	Episode: "Dark Fear"
1960	Shirley Temple's Storybook	Samuel	Episode: "The Reluctant Dragon"
1960	Klondike	Piano Delivery Man	Episode: "Keys to Trouble"
1960	Tales of Wells Fargo	Ben Wilson	Episode: "The Bride and the Bandit"
1960	Perry Mason	Charles Knudsen, night watchman	S4, E5 "The Case of the Lavender Lipstick"
1960	Two Faces West	Willie Medford	Episode: "The Proud Man"
1960	The Rifleman	Farley	Episode: “The Jailbird”
1960–1961	Death Valley Days	Slim Newell / Leo Harris	2 episodes
1960–1962	Laramie	Elmo Regis / Mr. Colby / Samuel Clemens	3 episodes
1961	The Rifleman	Finny	Episodes: "The Wyoming Story: Part 1" & "The Wyoming Story: Part 2"
1961	Shotgun Slade	Ed Brandon	Episode: "A Gun and a Prayer"
1961	The Law and Mr. Jones	Unknown character	Episode: "Indian War"
1961	The Jack Benny Program	1st Desk Clerk	Episode: "Jack Goes to Las Vegas"
1961	Stagecoach West	Foster / Reider	2 episodes
1961	The Asphalt Jungle	Al Stehl	Episode: "The Friendly Gesture"
1961	The Aquanauts	Oscar / Haber	2 episodes
1961	Adventures in Paradise	Reverend Forbes	Episode: "Errand of Mercy"
1961	Hawaiian Eye	Harry Wilson	Episode: "Thomas Jefferson Chu"
1961	Cain's Hundred	Willie Beal	Episode: "The Penitent: Louis Strode"
1961	Dr. Kildare	Mr. Willis	Episode: "Holiday Weekend"
1961	Bus Stop	Jefty	Episode: "A Lion Walks Among Us"
1961	Ichabod and Me	Mr. Halliday	Episode: "Teenage Journalist"
1961–1962	Checkmate	Hokey / Henry Creasy	2 episodes
1961–1962	Lawman	Joe Brockway / Les Courtney	2 episodes
1961–1962	The Detectives	Ed Foster / Mr. Blane / Todd Adams / Helm Merriwether	4 episodes
1961–1963	The Untouchables	Brower / Agent Ned Ferber / Thomas B. Randall	3 episodes
1961–1964	Rawhide	Sheriff / Jebidiah Haddlebird / Townsman	3 episodes
1961–1965	The Andy Griffith Show	Mr. Sims / Naylor / Sales Clerk / Councilman Dobbs	4 episodes
1961–1971	Bonanza	Various characters	8 episodes
1962	Have Gun – Will Travel	Doc Halop	Episode: "Lazarus"
1962	Surfside 6	Finney Tate	Episode: "The Surfside Swindle"
1962	Follow the Sun	Fulton	Episode: "Marine of the Month"
1962	Alcoa Premiere	Herb Raymond	Episode: "The Very Custom Special"
1962	The Dick Powell Theatre	Gavin	Episode: "Pericles on 31st Street"
1962	Don't Call Me Charlie!	Dr. Martin	Episode: "Vive Judson McKay"
1962	The Eleventh Hour	Ed Crain	Episode: "Angie, You Made My Heart Stop"
1962	Saints and Sinners	Walter Hines	Episode: "A Night of Horns and Bells"
1962–1963	The Twilight Zone	Evans / Scanlan	2 episodes
1962–1965	The Dick Van Dyke Show	Mr. Brumley / Mr. Waring / Chaplain Berger	4 episodes
1963	Empire	Joseph Williams	Episode: "End of an Image"
1963	Stoney Burke	Dr. John Banner	Episode: "Image of Glory"
1963	Make Room for Daddy	Impatient Postal Customer	Episode: "Rusty's Birthday"
1963	I'm Dickens, He's Fenster	Charlie Piedmont	Episode: "Senior Citizen Charlie"
1963	Temple Houston	Marshal Cloud	Episode: "Gallows in Galilee"
1963	Kraft Suspense Theatre	Newton Yort	Episode: "A Hero for Our Times"
1963	The Greatest Show on Earth	Unknown character	Episode: "Lady in Limbo"
1963–1967	The Fugitive	Various characters	6 episodes
1964	Grindl	Sladowski	Episode: "Grindl, Private Eye"
1964	Perry Mason	Larsen Halstead	S7, E16 "The Case of the Ice-Cold Hands"
1964	Destry	Dr. Forbes	Episode: "Destry Had a Little Lamb"
1964	Arrest and Trial	J.H. Salomon	Episode: "The Black Flower"
1964	The Rogues	Madigan	Episode: "The Personal Touch"
1964	The Outer Limits	E.F. Larkin / Mr. Bishop	2 episodes
1965	Wendy and Me	Orville Beaumont	Episode: "A Bouquet for Mr. Bundy"
1965	The Bill Dana Show	Mr. Clark	Episode: "The Court Jester"
1965	The Cara Williams Show	Fuliner	Episode: "Pawn Ticket for a Ticker"
1965	Peyton Place	Parole Officer / E.J. Taggart	2 episodes
1965	Profiles in Courage	Taylor / Dr. Fenner	2 episodes
1965–1966	Hank	Coach Ossie Weiss	21 episodes
1965–1967	The Virginian	Ed Harger / Doc	2 episodes
1965–1967	Gomer Pyle, U.S.M.C.	Policeman / Harper Caldwell	2 episodes
1966	Laredo	Ira	Episode: "Road to San Remo"
1966–1973	The F.B.I.	Various characters	10 episodes
1967	The Invaders	The Minister	Episode: "The Experiment"
1967	Rango	Sheriff Simmons	Episode: "Gunfight at the K.O. Saloon"
1967	The Road West	Thomas Grimmer	Episode: "Elizabeth's Odyssey"
1967	Gomer Pyle - U.S.M.C.	Police Officer	Episode: "The Prize Boat"
1967	Cimarron Strip	Judge Quayle	Episode: "Nobody"
1967	The Big Valley	Matt Carson	Episode: "Night of the Executioner"
1967–1969	Mannix	Mr. Coombs / Petey O'Grady / Dan Turpin	3 episodes
1968	The Second Hundred Years	General Craven	Episode: "For Whom the Drums Beat"
1968	Petticoat Junction	Mr. Peck	Episode: "Ring-A-Ding-Ding"
1968	The Wild Wild West	Captain Lyman Butler / Senator Seth Buckley	2 episodes
1968–1969	Judd, for the Defense	Dr. Fred Zellmer / Mr. LeBow	2 episodes
1968–1969	The Ghost & Mrs. Muir	Norrie Coolidge	6 episodes
1969	The Brady Bunch	Minister	Episode: "The Honeymoon"
1969	Lancer	Sheriff	Episode: "The Kid"
1969–1973	Ironside	Old Librarian / Mr. Carew / Thomas Gibbs	3 episodes
1970	The Boy Who Stole the Elephant	Stilts	Television film
1970	Bracken's World	Man on Bus	Episode: "Fallen, Fallen Is Babylon"
1970	The Name of the Game	Victor Bychek	Episode: "Echo of a Nightmare"
1970	The Interns	Edgar Jarvis	Episode: "Death Wish"
1970	The Young Lawyers	Jacobi	Episode: "MacGillicuddy Always Was a Pain in the Neck"
1971	The Bold Ones: The New Doctors	Casey	Episode: "Angry Man"
1971	O'Hara, U.S. Treasury	Billy Jack	Episode: "Operation: Moonshine"
1972	Nichols	Harrigan	Episode: "Sleight of Hand"
1972	The Mod Squad	Store Owner	Episode: "Taps, Play It Louder"
1972–1973	The Rookies	Billy Levinson / Studio Guard	2 episodes
1973	Ghost Story	Harry Bell	Episode: "Earth, Air, Fire and Water"
1973	Winesburg, Ohio	Parcival	Television film
1973	Barnaby Jones	Andy Spake	Episode: "Murder-Go-Round"
1973	Adam-12	Dave Carlson	Episode: ”Venice Division”
1973–1974	Cannon	Walt Fox / Windom Salter	2 episodes
1974	Chopper One	Motel Manager	Episode: "Strain of Innocence"
1974	Chase	Parino	Episode: "Out of Gas"
1974	The Greatest Gift	Deacon Hurd	Television film
1974	Paper Moon	Orville	Episode: "Bonnie and Clyde"
1974	The Manhunter	Harry Bell	Episode: "The Lodester Ambush"
1974–1983	Little House on the Prairie	Reverend Alden	76 episodes
1975	Shazam!	Seldom Seen Slim	Episode: "Fool's Gold"
1975	Saturday Night Live	Man at Veterinary Clinic	Episode: "Candice Bergen/Esther Phillips"
1976	The Rockford Files	Peter Preli	Episode: "Where's Houston?"
1976	The Streets of San Francisco	Watchman	Episode: "Dead or Alive"
1977	Green Eyes	Mr. Cousins	Television film
1977	Emergency!	Dr. Hubert Nippert	Episode: "Upward and Onward"
1978	The Incredible Hulk	Dr. Malone	Episode: "The Beast Within"
1978	The Winds of Kitty Hawk	Ace Hutchin	Television film
1981	Charlie's Angels	Bluford Catlin	Episode: "Moonshinin' Angels"
1982	The Greatest American Hero	Supervisor	Episode: "Train of Thought"
1982	Matt Houston	Henry	Episode: "Who Would Kill Ramona?"
1983	Little House: Look Back to Yesterday	Reverend Alden	Television film
1984	Little House: The Last Farewell	Reverend Alden	Television film
1986	Starman	Ralph Wollery	Episode: "Fever"
1987	Werewolf	Russell	Episode: "Friendly Haven"
1988	Charles in Charge	'Buzz' Powell	Episode: "Poppa, the Sailor Man"
1988	Bonanza: The Next Generation	Sills	Television film
1988	First Impressions	Milt	Episode: "Pilot"
1989	Roseanne	Joe	Episode: "Lobocop"
1989	Ann Jillian	Unknown character	Episode: "Buddy System"
1990	The Bradys	Minister	Episode: "The Brady 500"
1990–1991	In the Heat of the Night	J.L. Lambry	2 episodes
1991	L.A. Law	Chester Mead	Episode: "On the Toad Again"
1991	Empty Nest	Mr. Sobel	Episode: "Almost Like Being in Love"
1992	The Secret of Lost Creek	Henry "Grandpa" Fogel	Unknown episodes
1992–1996	Picket Fences	Reverend Henry Novotny	20 episodes
1994	Rebel Highway	Gary	Episode: "Runaway Daughters"
1997	George and Leo	Uncle Dick	Episode: "The Thanksgiving Show"
1998	Ally McBeal	Vincent Robbins	Episode: "Alone Again"
2000	Spin City	Dr. Marsh Laughlin, DDS	Episode: "Smile"
2001	Diagnosis: Murder	Danny McNamara	2 episodes
2001	Family Law	Frank Watson	Episode: "The Gay Divorcee"
2001–2002	Maybe It's Me	Grandpa Fred Stage	21 episodes
2003	Lizzie McGuire	Moe	Episode: "My Fair Larry" (final acting role)
