= Shooting Star Tommy Gun =

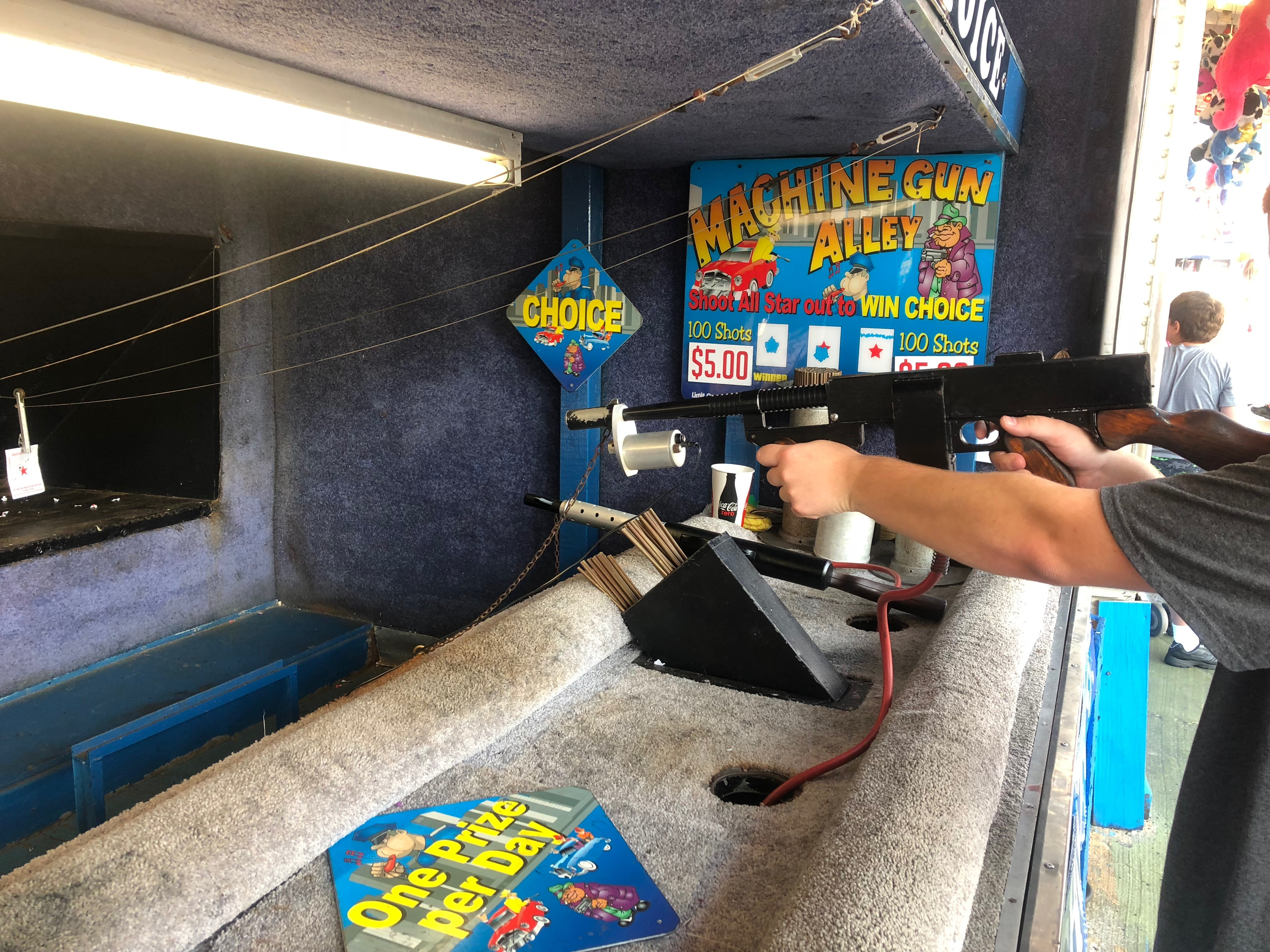
- Game play at Steel Pier in Atlantic City.
- Type: Pneumatic BB machine gun
- Place of origin: United States

Production history
- Manufacturer: Feltman; Shooting Star Inc
- Variants: Tommy Gun; Combat

Specifications
- Caliber: .150 BB
- Sights: Iron; Laser pointer

The Shooting Star Tommy Gun is a pneumatic machine gun manufactured by Shooting Star Inc. It was invented by Charles A. Feltman, the grandson of Charles Feltman, often credited as the inventor of the hot dog in Coney Island, New York with Feltman previously inventing a hot dog roll toaster.

The first version of the game was called "Mow 'Em Down" and featured a pneumatic machine gun resembling a water cooled heavy machine gun and was invented in 1939. Later Feltman modified the design to resemble a Thompson submachine gun with a patent granted in 1941 The weapon fires 100 .150 BBs, made of #2 lead shot. Later, a "Combat" variant was introduced, which crudely resembles a Colt AR-15.

Feltman industries operated in Coney Island for many years until it then moved to New Jersey and became Shooting Star Inc, as the object of the game was to shoot out all traces of a red star on a white paper card.

== Gallery ==
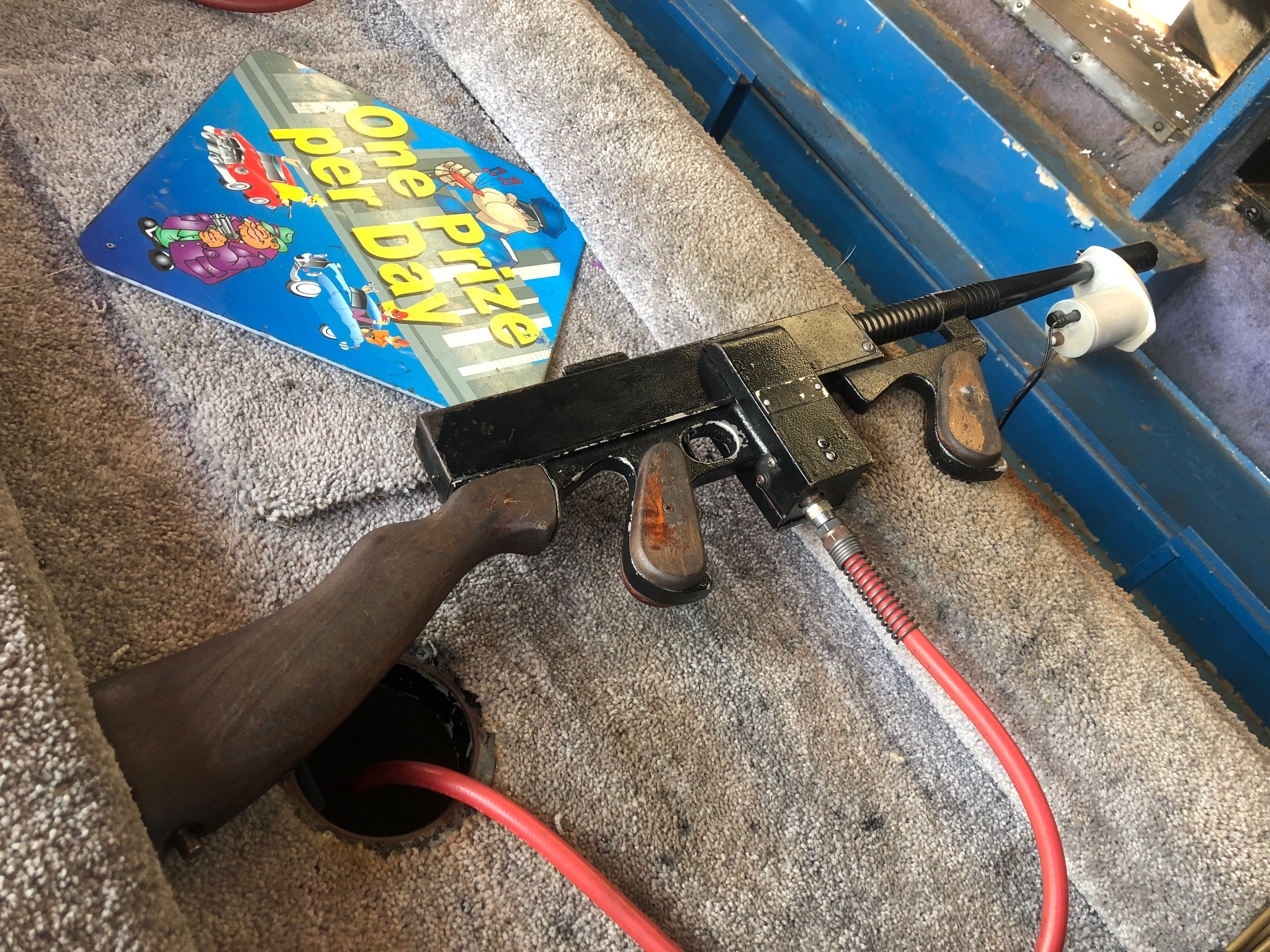
The "Tommy Gun" variant.

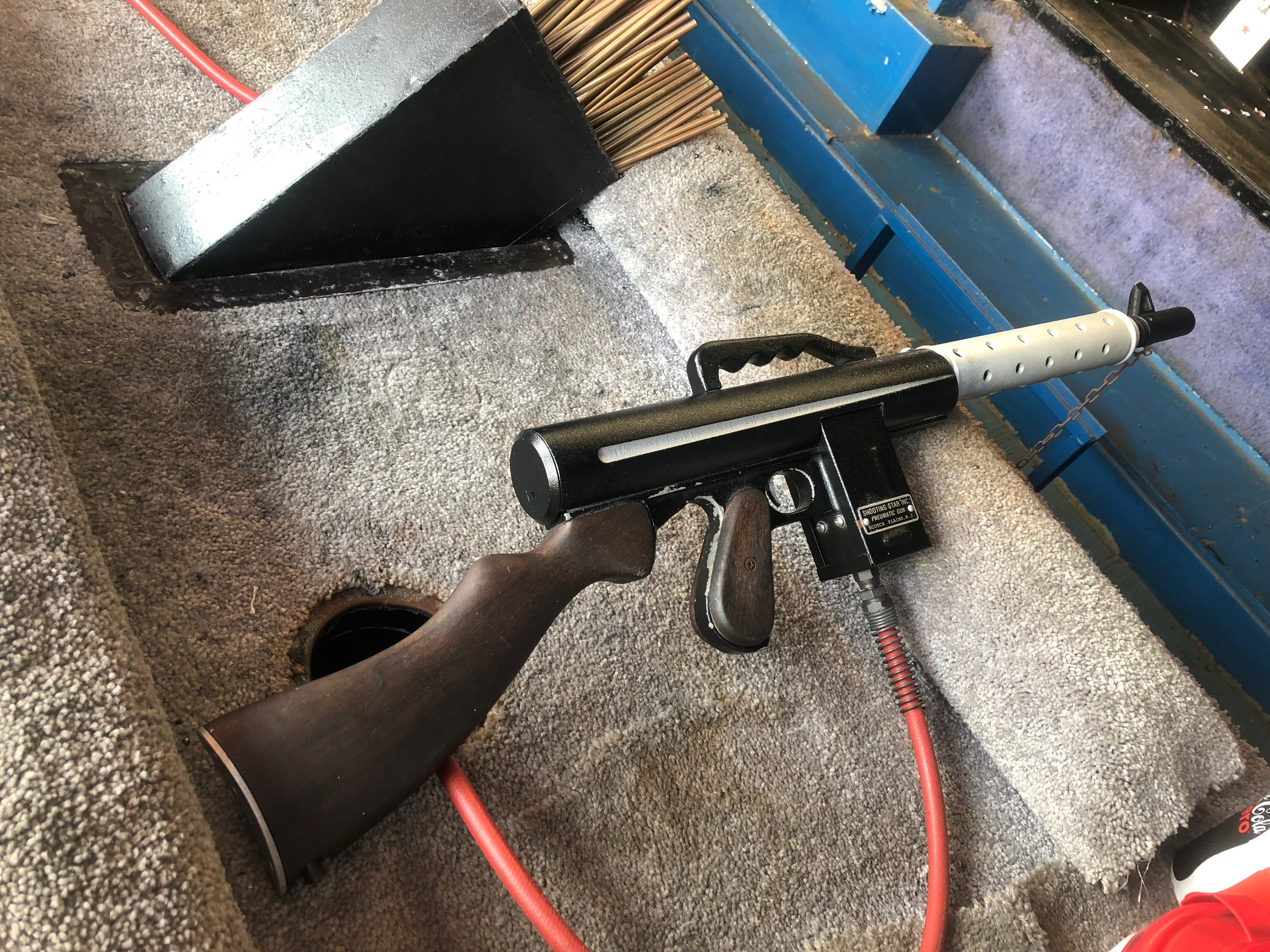
The "Combat" variant.
