= Rango (TV series) =

American Western sitcom series

- Created by: Harvey Bullock; R.S. Allen
- Starring: Tim Conway; Guy Marks; Norman Alden
- Theme music composer: Earle Hagen; Ben Raleigh
- Opening theme: "Rango" performed by Frankie Laine
- Country of origin: United States
- Original language: English
- No. of seasons: 1
- No. of episodes: 17

Production
- Camera setup: Multi-camera
- Running time: 30 minutes
- Production company: Thomas-Spelling Productions

Original release
- Network: ABC
- Release: January 13 – May 5, 1967

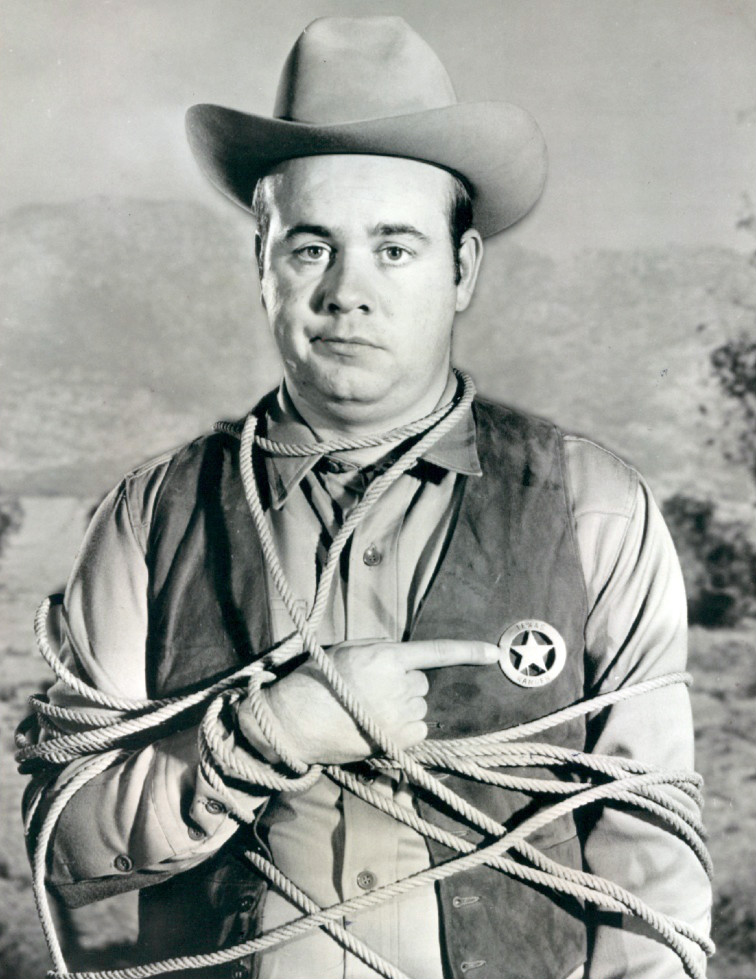
Tim Conway as Rango in a 1966 publicity photograph

Rango is an American Western sitcom starring comedian Tim Conway, which was broadcast in the United States on the ABC television network in 1967 and lasted 17 episodes.

== Synopsis ==
Rango is an inept, bumbling Texas Ranger in the Old West who has been assigned to the supply room at the quietest post the Rangers have, Deep Wells Ranger Station, so as to keep him from creating unnecessary trouble. He seems to bring his own trouble with him, however, as after his arrival, crime suddenly returns to the Deep Wells area, a place that had seen very little of it during the previous 20 years.

Rango's assistant in the supply room is Pink Cloud, an overly assimilated American Indian who is very fond of the ways of the white people and prefers reading a book in a comfortable bed to living the traditional life of a Plains Indian. Pink Cloud's command of the English language is generally better than those of the white people around him; for example, in one episode, he says, "Rango say him return when sun high over teepee. By that, I presume he meant that he would be back by noon."

Also at the Deep Wells Ranger Station is Captain Horton, Rango's long-suffering company commander. Horton wants to transfer Rango out of Deep Wells, but cannot because Rango's father is the head of the Texas Rangers.

== Cast ==
- Tim Conway...Rango
- Guy Marks...Pink Cloud
- Norman Alden...Captain Horton

== Production ==
Tim Conway previously starred in McHale's Navy from 1962 to 1966 and in two theatrical films spun off from the series, McHale's Navy in 1964 and McHale's Navy Joins the Air Force in 1965. Rango was the first of several unsuccessful attempts at giving Conway a starring role in a situation comedy of his own.

Rango′s theme song, "Rango", was co-written by Earle Hagen and Ben Raleigh and sung by Frankie Laine.

== Reception ==
TV Guide ranked the series number 47 on its "TV Guide′s 50 Worst Shows of All Time" list in 2002.

== Broadcast history ==
Rango premiered on ABC on January 13, 1967. It lasted only half a season, and its 17th and final new episode aired on May 5, 1967. Reruns of Rango then aired during its regular time slot until September 1, 1967. The show was broadcast at 9:00 pm on Friday throughout its run.

== Episodes ==
| No. | Title | Directed by | Written by | Original release date |
|---|---|---|---|---|
| 1 | "Rango the Outlaw" | Unknown | Unknown | January 13, 1967 |
The Texas Rangers must get Rango out of their way so they can carry out their plan to trap a gang of thieves. Guest stars: Ned Romero, Ted DeCorsia, John Cliff, Herbie Faye, and Michael Carr
| 2 | "The Daring Holdup of the Deadwood Stage" | Unknown | Unknown | January 20, 1967 |
While pursuing a gang of bank robbers, Rango plays a wild hunch. Guest stars: Parley Baer, Leo Gordon, Kent Taylor, Roxanne Arlen, Troy Melton, and Ernie Anderson
| 3 | "The Town Tamer" | Unknown | Unknown | January 27, 1967 |
Rango believes he has reformed an outlaw, but is unaware that the outlaw's gang plans to steal a gold shipment. Guest stars: Paul Richards and Robert Strauss
| 4 | "Gunfight at the K.O. Saloon" | Unknown | Unknown | February 3, 1967 |
Rango impersonates a classy thief to find his hidden loot. Guest stars: Joan Staley, Howard Caine, and Dabbs Greer
| 5 | "The Spy Who Was Out Cold" | Murray Golden | Frank Gill, Jr. & G. Carleton Brown | February 10, 1967 |
While trying to play the role of a detective, Rango finds two prime suspects from a gun-running gang. Guest stars: John Harmon, and Paul Mantee
| 6 | "What's a Nice Girl Like You Doing Holding Up a Place Like This?" | Unknown | Unknown | February 17, 1967 |
After Rango mistakes a female bank robber for the governor's daughter, he unwittingly helps her case the bank she plans to rob. Guest stars: Carolyn Jones, Richard Deacon, Peter Leeds, Ruben Moreno, and Michael Carr
| 7 | "Requiem for a Ranger" | Unknown | Unknown | February 24, 1967 |
To find the thief who stole a gold shipment worth $25,000, Rango pretends to be dead. Guest stars: Billy DeWolfe, Larry Pennell, and Larry D. Mann
| 8 | "Diamonds Look Better Around Your Neck Than a Rope" | Sidney Lanfield | R.S. Allen & Harvey Bullock | March 3, 1967 |
Rango tries to solve a jewel robbery and a murder. Guest stars: Mike Mazurki and Linda Foster
| 9 | "My Teepee Runneth Over" | Unknown | Unknown | March 10, 1967 |
After unfriendly Indians capture Pink Cloud, Rango impersonates a peddler of pots and pans as he tries to find and rescue him. Guest stars: Jesse White, Michael Pate, Walter Sande, Grace Lee Whitney, and Bill Foster
| 10 | "The Not So Good Train Robbery" | Unknown | Unknown | March 17, 1967 |
While transporting a female prisoner, Rango mistakes a disguised Captain Horton for a member of her gang. Guest stars: Myrna Fahey and William Mims
| 11 | "Viva Rango" | Unknown | Unknown | March 24, 1967 |
Rango is lovesick, and a little white lie leads to big trouble when he is ordered to guard his girlfriend's jewels. Guest stars: Vito Scotti and Toian Matchinga
| 12 | "It Ain't the Principle, It's the Money" | Sidney Lanfield | Scott Anderson | March 31, 1967 |
Rango and Pink Cloud impersonate an infamous outlaw and his Indian sidekick so they can arrest a criminal gang. Guest stars: Henry Beckman, Robert J. Wilke, Don Wilbanks, and Tol Avery
| 13 | "Shootout at Mesa Flats" | Unknown | Unknown | April 7, 1967 |
Rango helps a wounded Captain Horton guard an outlaw. Guest stars: Lane Bradford and Jonathan Hole
| 14 | "In a Little Mexican Town" | Murray Golden | Herbert Finn & Alan Dinehart | April 14, 1967 |
Rango and Pink Cloud head into Mexico to capture an elusive Mexican bandit. Guest stars: Don Haggerty, Mike de Anda, Rodolfo Hoyos Jr., and Pedro Gonzalez Gonzalez
| 15 | "If You Can't Take It with You, Don't Go" | Unknown | Unknown | April 21, 1967 |
After Rango jails two robbers, they secretly tunnel from their jail cell to a safe next door. Guest stars: Tom Stern, Martin West, Don Gazzaniga, Herbie Faye, and Barry Kelley
| 16 | "You Can't Scalp a Bald Indian" | Unknown | Unknown | April 28, 1967 |
Rango impersonates an Indian to capture Chief Angry Bear, but complications ensure when Angry Bear's daughter decides she wants to marry Rango. Guest stars: Anthony Caruso, and Muriel Landers
| 17 | "The Rustlers" | Unknown | Unknown | May 5, 1967 |
Rango tries to prove a family of sheepherders is really a gang of rustlers. Guest stars: Ellen Corby and Walter Burke
