= Charles Feltman =

German-American restaurateur

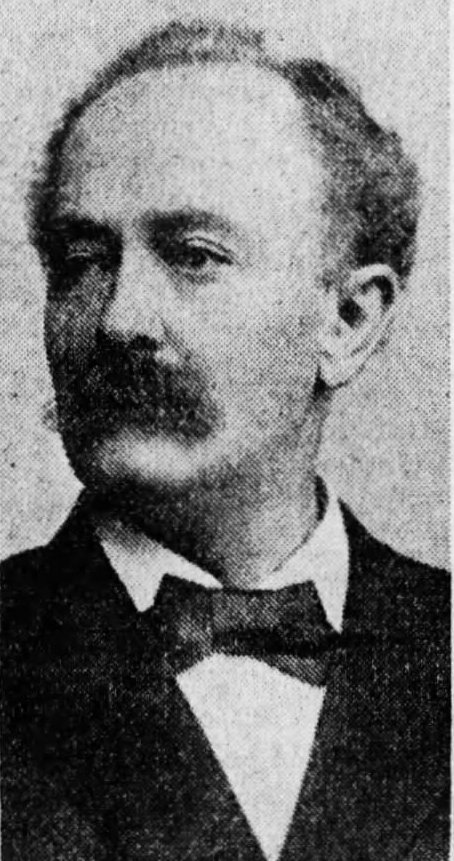
Charles Feltman, circa 1910

Charles Feltman (1841–1910) was a German restaurateur in the United States. He is one of several claimed inventors of the hot dog. In 1871, Feltman began building his restaurant complex. It achieved its heyday in the 1920s, serving nearly 5,250,000 people a year, being a large restaurant complex with several restaurants, two bars, a beer garden, a famous carousel, and other attractions, and offering many types of food beyond hot dogs.

== From pushcart to restaurant mogul ==
Feltman was born in 1841 to a Lutheran family in Germany and emigrated to America in 1856, at the age of fifteen. He was familiar with the frankfurter, named for Frankfurt-am-Main in his native land. Feltman's operation began operating a pushcart pie wagon at the Coney Island beach in 1867, selling fresh pies to beachfront hotels. When his customers began asking him to add sandwiches to serve as well he added a small charcoal stove to his cart and began selling pork sausages on rolls which he called "red hots" and later "hot dogs."

Henry Collins Brown, a New York historian, explained its attraction: "It could be carried on the march, eaten on the sands between baths, consumed on a carousel, used as a baby's nipple to quiet an obstreperous infant, and had other economic appeals to the summer pleasure seeker".

In 1871, Feltman leased land and began building his restaurant complex. It achieved its heyday in the 1920s, serving nearly 5,250,000 people a year, being a large restaurant complex with several restaurants, two bars, a beer garden, a famous carousel, and other attractions, and offering many types of food beyond hot dogs.

Nathan Handwerker was working at Feltman's as a roll slicer when he quit to found Nathan's. Handwerker undersold Feltman, offering hot dogs for five cents instead of ten, at a more downscale operation than Feltman's, but eventually Nathan's became the Coney Island hot dog purveyor and a nationwide brand which thrived into the 21st century.

== Family and business after his death ==
Feltman died in 1910 (he is interred at Green-Wood Cemetery in Brooklyn, New York) after which his family ran the business. Feltman's sons Charles L. Feltman and Alfred F. Feltman and grandson Charles A. Feltman, who had been operating the restaurant, sold the operation in 1946 to Alvan Kallman and others. The restaurant closed in 1954. The land was later used to construct the Astroland amusement park which opened in 1962 and closed in 2008, subsequently replaced by a new Luna Park. The last remnant of Feltman's – the building that had housed the kitchen – was demolished in 2010.

Charles' Feltman's grandson Charles A. Feltman invented the Shooting Star Tommy Gun, a pneumatic BB machine gun used in fair and amusement park stalls for many decades and continuing well into the 21st century (the device is used by players to shoot out all traces of a red star on a paper target). Shooting Star Games was founded by Charles A. Feltman and continues to manufacture the device in the 21st century. There was for years a shooting gallery on the original Feltman's site.

In 2017, a hot dog emporium named Feltman's of Coney Island in New York's East Village was opened on the original site, a homage to the original Feltman's.
