= Doctor, You've Got to Be Kidding! =

1967 film by Peter Tewksbury

- Directed by: Peter Tewksbury
- Screenplay by: Phillip Shuken
- Based on: Three for a Wedding; 1965 novel by Patte Wheat Mahan
- Produced by: Douglas Laurence
- Starring: Sandra Dee; George Hamilton; Celeste Holm; Bill Bixby; Dick Kallman; Mort Sahl; Dwayne Hickman
- Cinematography: Fred J. Koenekamp
- Edited by: Fredric Steinkamp
- Music by: Kenyon Hopkins
- Production company: Trident Productions
- Distributed by: Metro-Goldwyn-Mayer
- Release date: April 28, 1967
- Running time: 94 minutes
- Country: United States
- Language: English
- Box office: $1,387,000 (US/ Canada)

Doctor, You've Got to Be Kidding! is a 1967 American comedy film directed by Peter Tewksbury and starring Sandra Dee, George Hamilton and Celeste Holm.

Filmink called it "one of the many movies that killed Dee's career".

== Plot ==
Heather Halloran, pursued by three men who want to marry her, is about to give birth. The events that led to her pregnancy are recalled. Her mother wants Heather to be a singing star, but she works as a secretary for the rich Harlan Wycliff. She falls in love with Wycliff, but he wants her to abandon her budding career as a singer.

== Cast ==
- Sandra Dee as Heather Halloran
- George Hamilton as Harlan W. Wycliff
- Celeste Holm as Louise Halloran
- Bill Bixby as Dick Bender
- Dwayne Hickman as Hank Judson
- Allen Jenkins as Joe Bonney
- Dick Kallman as Pat Murad
- Mort Sahl as Dan Ruskin

== Production ==
The film is based on the 1965 debut novel Three for the Wedding by writer Patte Wheat Mahan, which the Los Angeles Times called "a highly entertaining and amusing book." Trident Productions, a company established by director Delbert Mann, producer Douglas Laurence and writer Dale Wasserman, bought the film rights. Mahan agreed to write the screenplay and Charles Walters was originally slated to direct.

The film was originally entitled Three for the Wedding, then This Way Out, Please before its final title of Doctor, You've Got to Be Kidding!.

Sandra Dee selected the role of Heather instead of a part in a film shooting in London with Warren Beatty. This was Dee's first film after leaving Universal Studios, where she had been under exclusive contract for ten years. She hoped the role would assist in her transition to more mature screen roles.

George Hamilton was in a highly publicized romance at the time with Lynda Bird, daughter of president Lyndon Johnson.

Doctor, You've Got to Be Kidding! marked Celeste Holm's first film since Bachelor Flat (1961). She said: "It's kind of an Italian comedy set in Glendale. Like most Italian comedies, it's based on a tragic truth. When the film opens, a young girl is unmarried and pregnant."

== Reception ==
After the film was previewed, MGM commissioned Phillip Shuken to write a sequel to star Hamilton and Dee, but the sequel did not materialize.
