= Hell Canyon Outlaws =

1957 film by Paul Landres

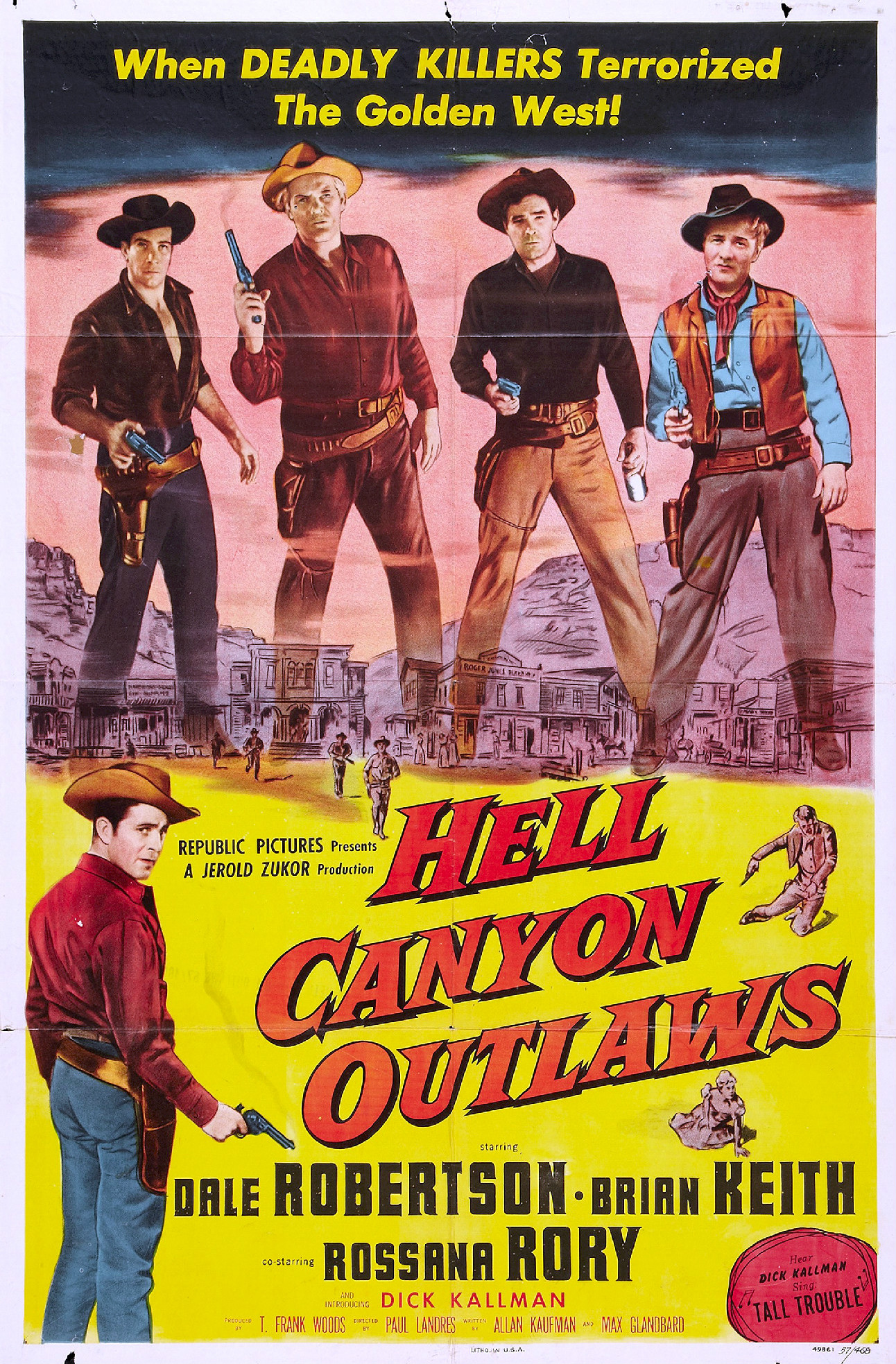
- Theatrical release poster
- Directed by: Paul Landres
- Screenplay by: Allan Kaufman; Max Glandbard
- Produced by: Thomas F. Woods
- Starring: Dale Robertson; Brian Keith; Rossana Rory; Dick Kallman; Don Megowan; Mike Lane
- Cinematography: Floyd Crosby
- Edited by: Elmo Williams
- Music by: Irving Gertz
- Production company: Jarod Zukor Productions
- Distributed by: Republic Pictures
- Release date: October 6, 1957 (United States)
- Running time: 72 minutes
- Country: United States
- Language: English

Hell Canyon Outlaws is a 1957 American Western film directed by Paul Landres and written by Allan Kaufman and Max Glandbard. The film stars Dale Robertson, Brian Keith, Rossana Rory, Dick Kallman, Don Megowan and Mike Lane. The film was released on October 6, 1957, by Republic Pictures.

== Cast ==
- Dale Robertson as Sheriff Caleb Wells
- Brian Keith as Happy Waters
- Rossana Rory as Maria
- Dick Kallman as Smiley Andrews
- Don Megowan as Henchman Walt
- Mike Lane as Henchman Nels
- Buddy Baer as Henchman Stan
- Charles Fredericks as Deputy Bear
- Alexander Lockwood as Bert
- James Nusser as Oscar Schultz
- James Maloney as Rudy
- William Pullen as Tom
- George Ross as Cliff
- George Pembroke as Jed
- Vicente Padula as Julio
- Tom Hubbard as Harv
