= Linda Foster (actress) =

English-American film and television actress

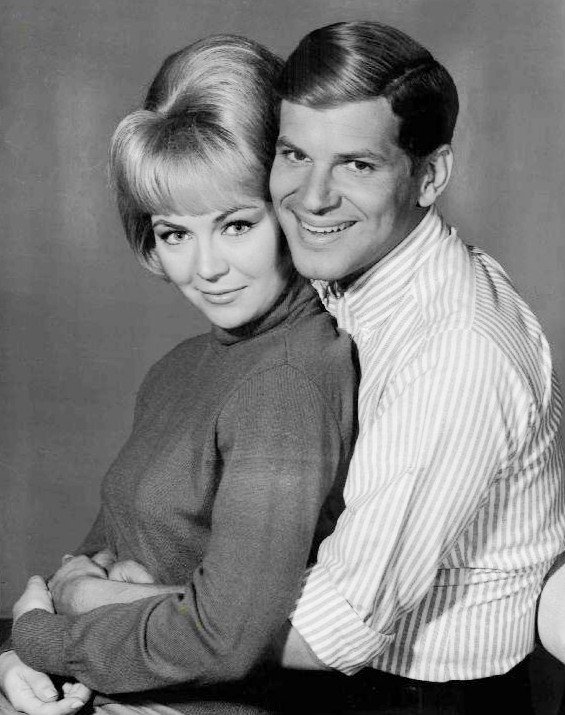
- Foster with Dick Kallman in Hank, 1965
- Born: June 12, 1944 (age 82); Lancaster, Lancashire, England
- Occupations: Film and television actress
- Years active: 1963–1983
- Spouses: Vince Edwards (m. 1967; div. 1972) Edward Winter (m. 1980; died 2001)

Linda Foster (born June 12, 1944) is an English-American film and television actress. She is best known for playing the title character's girlfriend Doris Royal in the American sitcom television series Hank.

== Life and career ==
Foster was born in Lancaster, Lancashire, the daughter of Nicholas, a marine engineer, and Hilda Foster (née Wood), who ran a dance studio. At the age of six, she learned ballet and modern dance. Foster and her family later moved to Toronto, Ontario, in 1957. She then settled in Los Angeles, California. Foster graduated high school in Van Nuys, California, and studied to become a secretary. She began her screen career in 1963, appearing in an episode of the television sitcom My Three Sons.

In 1965, Foster joined the cast of the NBC sitcom television series Hank, starring as Doris Royal, the girlfriend of the title character. After the series ended in 1966, she guest-starred in television programs including Gunsmoke, The Man from U.N.C.L.E., F Troop, Bonanza, Tom, Dick, and Mary, McHale's Navy, The Virginian, and Rango. She also appeared in films such as Honeymoon Hotel, The Ambushers, Marriage on the Rocks, John Goldfarb, Please Come Home!, and Young Fury.While appearing in the anthology television series Bob Hope Presents the Chrysler Theatre, she had a contract with Universal Pictures, keeping her busy on the television series with separate roles on two episodes.

Foster retired from acting in 1983, last appearing in the ABC soap opera television series Dynasty as a journalist in the episode "Tender Comrades".
