= Dick Kallman =

American actor (1933–1980)

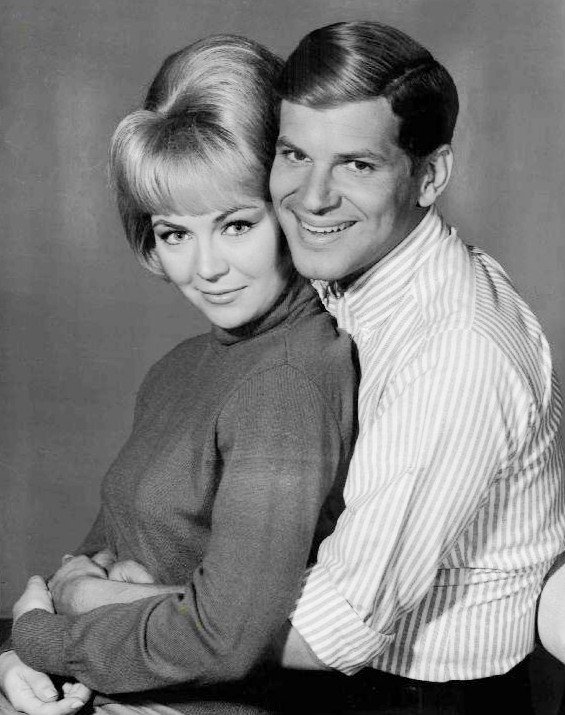
- Kallman (right) with Linda Foster in Hank, 1965
- Born: July 7, 1933; Brooklyn, New York City, New York, U.S.
- Died: February 22, 1980 (aged 46); Manhattan, New York City, New York, U.S.
- Cause of death: Gunshot wound
- Resting place: Forest Lawn Memorial Park (Hollywood Hills)
- Occupation: Actor
- Partner(s): Steven Szladek (1954-1980, their murders)

Dick Kallman (July 7, 1933 – February 22, 1980) was an American actor.

== Early life ==
Kallman was born in Brooklyn, New York City, into a wealthy family. His father Alvan Kallman, a former barnstorming pilot, was owner of the Savoy-Plaza Hotel in New York City, The Balsams Grand Resort Hotel in New Hampshire, and the St. Johns Hotel in Havana. Kallman's mother, Zara Whitman Kallman, had been a Broadway actress.

== Career ==
After working on the New York stage where he won a Theatre World Award for his performance in the 1951 Broadway musical Seventeen, Kallman starred in the title role of the 1965–1966 television sitcom Hank. He returned to Broadway, taking over the leading role in the musical Half a Sixpence. As a singer, he released several albums of pop standards, including Hits & the Misses and Speak Softly, and in conjunction with his TV series, Hank Sings and Dick Kallman Drops in as 'Hank'. He performed one of his songs on an episode of Hullabaloo.

Kallman played non-recurring roles in TV series such as The Jack Benny Show, Bachelor Father and Medical Center. He also acted in episodes 110 and 111 of Batman, playing Little Louie Groovy, a takeoff on record producer Phil Spector.

== Filmography ==
Television and Film
Year	Title	Role	Notes
1950	The Billy Rose Show	Unnamed role	(TV Series), 1 episode: "Bright Golden Girl"
1950	Skylarkin' Time	Singer	(Short film)
1955-1960	The Jack Benny Program	Dancer in Diner (1955)/ Unnamed role (1960)	(TV Series), 2 episodes: "Jack's Lunch Counter" and "Lunch Counter Murder"
1957	Hell Canyon Outlaws	Smiley Andrews	(Western film)
1958-1960	U.S. Marshal	Young Deputy (1958)/ Harry (1960)	(TV Series), 2 episodes: "Seventh Stranger" and "Paper Bullets"
1959	The Texan	Ben Howell / Grady Fenton	(TV Series), 2 episodes: "The Gunfighter" and "Dangerous Ground"
1959	Markham	Martin Valcour	(TV Series), 1 episode: "The Nephews"
1959	Born to Be Loved	Eddie Flynn	(Comedy film)
1959	Bachelor Father	Mike Brinkerhoff	(TV Series), 1 episode: "Bentley and the Motorcycle"
1959	Whirlybirds	Johnny	(TV Series), 1 episode: "A Matter of Trust"
1959	The Californians	Armand	(TV Series), 1 episode: "Deadly Tintype"
1959	Verboten!	Helmuth Strasser	(War film)
1960	The Lucy–Desi Comedy Hour	Bellboy	(TV Series), 1 episode: "Lucy Meets the Mustache"
1961	Back Street	Sailor at USO	(Drama film)
1965-1966	Hank	Hank Dearborn (title role)	(TV Series), 26 episodes
1967	Doctor, You've Got to Be Kidding!	Pat Murad	(Comedy film)
1967-1968	Batman	Little Louie Groovy	(TV Series), 2 episodes: "The Funny Feline Felonies" and "The Joke's on Catwoman"
1970-1974	Medical Center	Dr. Charlie Guinness (1970)/ Dr. Styles (1972)/ Larry (1974)	(TV Series), 3 episodes: "Witch Hunt", "The Outcast" and "Adults Only"

== Personal life ==
From youth, Kallman had exhibited an appreciation of fine antique furnishings and an acumen for business. Kallman formed a music publishing company in 1966. By the late 1970s, he had retired from show business and was a wealthy antiques and art dealer living with life partner Steven Szladek in a Manhattan apartment.

Kallman and Szladek were murdered by three intruders in 1980 during a robbery of the art, antiques, and jewelry in their apartment. The killers were later caught and convicted. A fictionalized account of Kallman's life, Up With the Sun by Thomas Mallon, was published by Knopf in February 2023.
