= Alvan Kallman =

American hotelier (1902–1964)

Alvan E. Kallman
- Born: March 13, 1902; New York City, U.S.
- Died: September 1, 1964 (aged 62); Miami, Florida, U.S.
- Occupation: Hotelier
- Spouse: Zara Whitman Kallman
- Children: Dick Kallman, Charles Kallman

Alvan Edward Kallman (March 13, 1902 – September 1, 1964) was an American hotelier.

Kallman was born in New York City to Charles Kallman and Regina Kallman. His father died when he was ten or eleven.

Kallman was a barnstorming pilot and later an air mail pilot in the early 20th century. After retiring from flying, he worked for the Hotel St. George in New York, serving as banquet manager from 1930 to 1939 (being the youngest banquet manager in the industry when appointed), then serving as general manager from 1939 to 1943.

Kallman then became owner of The Balsams Grand Resort Hotel in Dixville Notch, New Hampshire and in 1946 part-owner (with Benno Bechhold and Harry Socoloff) of Feltman's, the large iconic complex at Coney Island containing the world's largest restaurant and other attractions, buying it from founder Charles Feltman's family. He also owned the Savoy-Plaza Hotel in New York.

In 1953, Kallman bought the then-new St. Johns Hotel in the Vedado district of Havana, and a few years later added ten more stories. Following the Cuban Revolution, the Castro government nationalized his property in 1960 and expelled him from Cuba, wiping out his fortune. He died in Miami in 1964.

Kallman was married to Zara Whitman Kallman (1899 – 1988), a former Broadway actress. He had two sons, actor and singer Dick Kallman, and intelligence officer Charles Kallman.
