= Hank (1965 TV series) =

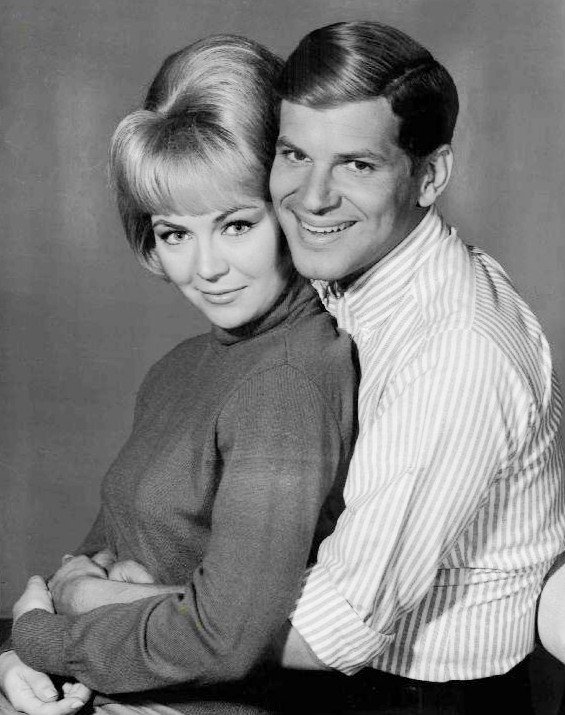
- Dick Kallman and Linda Foster.
- Genre: Situation comedy
- Created by: Hugh Benson
- Directed by: Leslie H. Martinson; Allen Baron and others
- Starring: Dick Kallman; Howard St. John; Dabbs Greer; Linda Foster; Katie Sweet; Lloyd Corrigan
- Theme music composer: Johnny Mercer; Frank Perkins
- Composers: Vic Mizzy; William Lava; Carl Brandt
- Country of origin: United States
- Original language: English
- No. of seasons: 1
- No. of episodes: 26

Production
- Executive producer: William T. Orr
- Producers: Hugh Benson; James Komack
- Running time: 24 minutes
- Production company: Warner Bros. Television

Original release
- Network: NBC
- Release: September 17, 1965 – April 15, 1966

Hank is a 1965 American television sitcom that starred Dick Kallman in the title role. The show is a notable early example of a program with a true series finale, in which the underlying premise of the series reaches a natural conclusion with its final episode.

== Synopsis ==
The show, which aired on NBC in 1965, revolves around a pair of orphans. In both the unaired pilot and first episode, Hank Dearborn is explained to be a teenager left to raise his young sister, Tina, after their parents die in a car crash.

Seeing that the best route to success is through higher education, Hank attempts to illegally audit classes at the fictional Western State University, while at the same time taking a variety of odd jobs, including running his own lunch truck on campus, to financially support what remains of his family. Hank's attempt to accomplish these two goals provides much of the show's humor, as he must engage in identity theft, impersonating various students when they are absent from class, and helped by sympathetic Professor McKillup, who has access to the student roll. Much of the drama arises from Hank's fear of his sister being forced into foster care.

Hank's life is further complicated because he is dating Doris Royal, the daughter of the university's registrar, Dr. Lewis Royal, who is on the lookout for unregistered students like Hank. Typical episodes show Hank narrowly avoiding detection as an impersonator. In the final episode, his true identity is compromised. Because of his excellent performance on a recent exam, though, the university rewards him with a full academic scholarship and formal admittance to the university.

The series ends with his sister remarking, "There goes my brother – the registered student."

== Cast ==
- Dick Kallman as Hank Dearborn
- Linda Foster as Doris Royal
- Howard St. John as Dr. Lewis Royal
- Dabbs Greer as Coach Ossie Weiss
- Lloyd Corrigan as Professor McKillup
- Katie Sweet as Tina Dearborn

== Episode list ==
Episode #	Episode title	Directed by	Written by	Original airdate	Episode Summary
1-1	"Who's Waldo Smith?" (pilot)	John Rich	Jim Fritzell and Everett Greenbaum	September 17, 1965	College drop-in Hank, an unregistered student who is hungry for learning, gets the help of Professor McKillup in his plots to attend classes in place of absent students.
1-2	"Will the Real Harvey Wheatley Please Stand Up?"	Sidney Miller	Arnie Rosen & Coleman Jacoby and Jerry Belson & Garry Marshall	September 24, 1965	Hank transforms a personality-challenged egghead (Bob Balaban) into the most sought-after man on campus.
1-3	"Dunsetter for President"	Gene Reynolds	Martin A. Ragaway	October 1, 1965	Hank tries to sabotage his own campaign when he is nominated for campus president, since winning would expose his "drop-in" status.
1-4	"Cherokee Hank"	Richard Kinon	Arnie Rosen & Coleman Jacoby	October 8, 1965	In his latest subterfuge, Hank disguises himself as Sam Lightfoot, a speedy Native American runner.
1-5	"Candidate"	Coby Ruskin	Douglas Morrow	October 15, 1965	Hank is temporarily disillusioned by the seemingly unethical conduct of his faculty friend.
1-6	"Catering Competition"	Coby Ruskin	Martin A. Ragaway	October 22, 1965	Hank faces bankruptcy when a professional food service arrives on campus.
1-7	"Farewell, Coach Weiss"	Coby Ruskin	Arnie Rosen & Coleman Jacoby	October 29, 1965	Hank arranges a surprise testimonial dinner for Western State's frustrated athletic director.
1-8	"My Boyfriend, the Doctor"	Howard Morris	Arnie Rosen & Coleman Jacoby	November 5, 1965	Hank encounters girl problems when he assumes the identity of a pre-med student.
1-9	"Somebody Loves This Albatross"	Coby Ruskin	Walter Black	November 12, 1965	Hank helps keep an honor student from dropping out of school by getting him a scholarship after the student's hidden athletic talents are uncovered.
1-10	"The Campus Caper"	Richard Kinon	William Raynor & Myles Wilder	November 19, 1965	Hank makes a mockery of a private detective who was hired by Dean Royal to ferret out unregistered students.
1-11	"Dean Royal, Matchmaker"	Coby Ruskin	Arnie Rosen & Coleman Jacoby	November 26, 1965	Dean Royal misinterprets Hank's invitation to his daughter as being a proposal to elope.
1-12	"They're Playing Our Song"	David Alexander	Douglas Morrow	December 3, 1965	Disguised as an absent music student, Hank composes a winning song for Professor Wagner.
1-13	"My Fair Co-Ed"	David Alexander	Teleplay by: William Raynor & Myles Widler and Arnie Rosen & Coleman Jacoby; Story by: William Raynor & Myles Wilder	December 10, 1965	Hank solves the "three's a crowd" problem by transforming an unsophisticated babysitter into a campus beauty contest winner.
1-14	"Four's a Crowd"	Gene Reynolds	William Raynor & Myles Wilder	December 24, 1965	Hank and his disguises cause Dean Royal to think that he is having hallucinations.
1-15	"Operation: Crackdown"	Coby Ruskin	Arnie Rosen & Coleman Jacoby	December 31, 1965	Hank once again outwits Dean Royal and thwarts the registrar's campaign to catch "drop-in" students.
1-16	"The Millionth Dollar Baby"	David Alexander	James Allardice & Tom Adair	January 7, 1966	Hank contributes to the stadium fund, but his generosity nearly exposes his "drop-in" status at Western State.
1-17	"Money, Money, Who's Got the Money?"	Charles R. Rondeau	Arnie Rosen & Coleman Jacoby	January 14, 1966	Hank gets unexpected help when a loan shark plans to take his truck as interest.
1-18	"The Trouble with Tina"	Allen Baron	Ed James & Seaman Jacobs	January 28, 1966	Guardianship of Tina is in jeopardy until Hank's friends come to his aid.
1-19	"His Highness, Count Gazzari"	Allen Baron	Ed James & Seaman Jacobs	February 4, 1966	Hank is able to convince a coach that he is a descendant of Italian nobility.
1-20	"The Ten Lettermen"	William Wiard	Bernie Kahn & Lila Garrett	February 11, 1966	In an attempt to help Coach Weiss keep his job, Hank helps recruit a star athlete to attend Western State.
1-21	"Rah, Rah, Commissar"	Mel Ferber	Barry Blitzer & Ray Brenner	February 25, 1966	A Russian exchange student is convinced by Hank to join the school's track team.
1-22	"Maury Wills to the Rescue"	William Wiard	Teleplay by: Sydney Zelinka & Don Richman; Story by: Sydney Zelinka	March 4, 1966	Hank extends an invitation to Los Angeles Dodgers shortstop Maury Wills to visit the campus in order to appease disgruntled alumni.
1-23	"Wedding, Anyone?"	Sidney Miller	Roy Kammerman & Sid Mandel	March 18, 1966	A canceled wedding party that could mean a big financial loss forces Hank to try to marry off Coach Gazzari.
1-24	"Ethel Weiss, Won't You Please Come Home?"	Sidney Miller	Joanna Lee	March 25, 1966	Coach Weiss patches up a lovers' quarrel between Hank and Doris, but alienates his wife in the process.
1-25	"McKillup's Best Seller"	William Wiard	Martin A. Ragaway	April 8, 1966	A 25-year-old obsolete textbook becomes the most sought-after book on campus thanks to Hank.
1-26	"Operation: Matriculation"	Sidney Miller	Ed James & Seaman Jacobs	April 15, 1966	Hank is finally unmasked as an elusive "drop-in" at Western State.

== Home media ==
On November 3, 2015, Warner Bros. released Hank: The Complete Series on DVD via their Warner Archive Collection. This is a manufacture-on-demand release, available through Warner's online store and Amazon.com.
