= List of The Andy Griffith Show characters =

The following is a list of characters of The Andy Griffith Show, an American sitcom television series, starring Andy Griffith. The series ran for eight seasons on CBS between October 3, 1960, and April 1, 1968. Episodes 1–159 (1960–1965) were broadcast in black-and-white, while the last 90 episodes (1965–1968) were in color.

While the characters of the fictional community of Mayberry were often stereotypes, they were generally portrayed as "uncomplicated" human beings who genuinely cared about each other.

Character	Actor	Brief Description	Seasons								Episodes
Character	Actor	Brief Description	1	2	3	4	5	6	7	8	Episodes
Andy Taylor	Andy Griffith	Sheriff of Mayberry; father (widowed) of Opie	Main	Main	Main	Main	Main	Main	Main	Main	249
Opie Taylor	Ronny Howard	Son of Andy Taylor	Main	Main	Main	Main	Main	Main	Main	Main	243
Barney Fife	Don Knotts	Deputy Sheriff of Mayberry	Main	Main	Main	Main	Main	Guest	Guest	Guest	162
Aunt Bee	Frances Bavier	Andy's paternal aunt	Main (Note: While Frances Bavier is not included in the main credits until the color seasons, she is included as main cast in this list due to the number of episodes she appears in each season. All other characters listed recurring or guest are based on their episode count as none of them appear in the opening credits.)	Main	Main	Main	Main	Main	Main	Main	188
Emma Watson (Note: Emma Watson is also named Emma Brand)	Cheerio Meredith	A townsperson	Recurring	Recurring							6
Jud Fletcher	Burt Mustin	Elderly citizen of Mayberry	Recurring	Guest	Guest		Guest		Guest		8 (Note: Burt Mustin was in a total of 14 episodes; only episodes where he was Jud Fletcher are counted here.)
Otis Campbell	Hal Smith	The town drunk who lets himself into the jail to sleep it off	Recurring	Recurring	Recurring	Recurring	Recurring	Guest	Guest		32
Mayor Pike	Dick Elliott	Mayor of Mayberry	Recurring	Recurring							11
Ellie Walker	Elinor Donahue	Pharmacist, Andy's girlfriend	Main (Note: Elinor Donahue only appeared in 12 episodes in the first season, but received billing in the opening credits)								12
Floyd Lawson (Note: Floyd Lawson was initially "Floyd Colby")	Howard McNear (Note: The first appearance of Floyd was played by Walter Baldwin)	Town barber	Recurring	Recurring	Recurring	Recurring	Recurring	Recurring	Recurring		80
Thelma Lou	Betty Lynn	Barney's primary girlfriend	Guest	Recurring	Recurring	Recurring	Recurring	Guest			26
Clara Edwards (Note: Clara Edwards was also referred to as Bertha Edwards, Bertha Johnson, and Clara Johnson)	Hope Summers	Aunt Bee's best friend	Guest	Recurring	Recurring	Recurring	Recurring	Recurring	Recurring		31
Ben Weaver	Will Wright/Tol Avery/Jason Johnson	Miserly old landlord and department store owner	Guest (Note: Will Wright played Ben Weaver in "The Christmas Story", "Andy Forecloses", and "The Merchant of Mayberry")	Guest		Guest (Note: Tol Avery played Ben Weaver in "The Shoplifters")		Guest (Note: Jason Johnson played Ben Weaver in "Aunt Bee Takes a Job" and "Goober's Replacement")			6
Rafe Hollister	Jack Prince	Local farmer and moonshiner		Guest	Guest						3
Leon	Clint Howard	Toddler in a cowboy outfit; never speaks in any of his appearances		Guest	Guest	Guest					5
John Masters	Olan Soule	Choir director and hotel manager		Guest	Guest	Guest	Guest				5
Mayor Roy Stoner	Parley Baer	Mayor of Mayberry			Recurring						7
Peggy McMillan	Joanna Moore	County nurse and Andy's girlfriend			Recurring						4
Daphne	Jean Carson	One of "The Fun Girls"			Guest	Guest	Guest				3
Skippy	Joyce Jameson	One of "The Fun Girls"			Guest	Guest	Guest				3
Wally	Norman Leavitt/Trevor Bardette/Cliff Norton	Owner of the filling station where Gomer and Goober work			Guest	Guest		Guest			4
Gomer Pyle	Jim Nabors	Mechanic at Wally's Filling Station			Recurring	Recurring					23
Asa Breeney	Charles P. Thompson	Elderly, sleepy security guard / hotel clerk			Guest	Guest	Guest				5
Reverend Hobart M. Tucker	William Keene	Pastor of All Souls Church			Guest	Guest	Guest	Guest		Guest	6
Helen Crump	Aneta Corsaut	School teacher and Andy's girlfriend			Recurring	Recurring	Recurring	Recurring	Recurring	Recurring	66
Johnny Paul Jason	Richard Keith	Opie's best friend			Guest	Recurring	Recurring	Guest			11
Briscoe Darling	Denver Pyle	Head of The Darlings			Guest	Guest	Guest		Guest		5
Charlene Darling	Maggie Peterson	Briscoe Darling's daughter. Had a crush on Andy.			Guest	Guest	Guest		Guest		5
The Darling Boys	The Dillards	Musical brothers			Guest	Guest	Guest		Guest		5
Ernest T. Bass	Howard Morris	A troublemaking mountain man			Guest	Guest	Guest	Guest			5
Malcolm Merriweather	Bernard Fox	English valet			Guest	Guest		Guest			3
Trey Bowden	David Alan Bailey	Opie's friend				Guest					3
Goober Pyle (Note: Goober Pyle's last name is initially introduced as Goober Beasley)	George Lindsey	Auto mechanic and cousin of Gomer Pyle				Guest	Recurring	Recurring	Recurring	Recurring	86
Deputy Warren Ferguson	Jack Burns	Floyd's nephew; replaces Barney as deputy						Recurring			11
Flora Malherbe	Alberta Nelson (Note: Nelson first appeared as Nettie, a classmate who had a crush on Barney, in "The Return of Barney Fife"; appeared credited as "Waitress" in the Mayberry RFD episode "Emmett's Retirement")	A waitress at the Mayberry Diner, Goober's girlfriend						Guest		Guest	3
Howard Sprague	Jack Dodson (Note: Jack Dodson first appeared on the show as Andy's insurance agent, Ed Jenkins)	The milquetoast county clerk						Recurring	Recurring	Recurring	37
Emmett Clark	Paul Hartman	Fix-it shop owner								Recurring	16
Martha Clark	Mary Lansing	Emmett's wife								Recurring	3
Sam Jones	Ken Berry	Widowed farmer and father of Mike Jones								Recurring	4

Characters are listed in order of their initial appearance. Only characters who appeared in 3 or more episodes are listed. For other characters, see The Andy Griffith Show guest stars.

Legend
= Main cast (credited)
= Recurring cast (3+ episodes per season)
= Guest cast (1-2 episodes per season)

== Unseen regular characters ==
Name	Seasons	Brief character summary
Sarah	1–8	Mayberry telephone operator who often eavesdrops on calls and has brief conversations with characters in at least 19 episodes
Juanita Beasley	1–5	Waitress at the Bluebird Diner who Barney talks to on the telephone as his second girlfriend in ten episodes. First mentioned in S1E26 "Andy Forecloses".
Leonard Blush	4–5	Radio announcer from station YLRB, later WMPD, from Mount Pilot, in "Family Visits" and "Barney's Bloodhound" whose voice is that of Howard Morris, who is also referred to by name in "The Song Festers"
