= Howard Sprague =

Fictional Character on the Andy Griffith Show

- The Andy Griffith Show, Mayberry R.F.D. character
- Howard Sprague (Jack Dodson)
- First appearance: "The County Clerk"; The Andy Griffith Show; March 14, 1966
- Last appearance: Return to Mayberry; April 13, 1986
- Portrayed by: Jack Dodson

In-universe information
- Full name: Howard Sprague
- Occupation: County Clerk
- Significant others: Irene Fairchild; Betty Parker; Millie Hutchins
- Religion: Christian
- Nationality: American

Howard Sprague is a fictional character on the CBS television sitcom The Andy Griffith Show, and its spin-off Mayberry R.F.D.. He was played by Jack Dodson from 1966 to 1971.

He was characterized by his milquetoast demeanor, moustache, bow ties, and a penchant for philosophy and culture. Howard was a repressed Mother's boy who lived with his overbearing and manipulative mother, played by Mabel Albertson. He appeared as the county clerk during the later color episodes of The Andy Griffith Show (and continued onto Mayberry R.F.D.).

While Jack Dodson made an earlier appearance as an insurance agent named Ed Jenkins, he first appeared as Howard in the sixth season. This was not unusual. Other show regulars were first introduced with different names: Hope Summers, who played Clara Edwards, first appeared as Bertha Johnson; Goober Pyle was first called Goober Beasley; and Arlene Golonka, who played Millie Swanson, was introduced as Millie Hutchins.

== Character overview ==
In the episode "The County Clerk", Howard is portrayed as socially stymied, especially when it came to dating. His mother even tries to thwart a double date he has with Andy Taylor, Helen Crump, and a nurse, by feigning heart palpitations. In the episode "The Lodge", Howard is about to join a men's social club, but his mother manipulates Goober Pyle with a sob story in an attempt to blackball his membership. Opie once said Howard threw a baseball "just like Aunt Bee".

When his mother remarried and moved to Mount Pilot, Howard sought to metamorphose into a swinging hipster. Wearing a smoking jacket and ascot, his plain home became a mod bachelor pad, with threshold-beads, and floor pillows. In the episode "Howard's New Life", he tried to recreate himself by moving to a Caribbean island (St. Benedict's) to become a beachcomber. Bored, he soon returned to Mayberry and resumed his drab bureaucratic job.

Howard's brief love interest/fiancée on The Andy Griffith Show was Millie Swanson (Arlene Golonka), a character who later dated Sam Jones (Ken Berry) on the spin-off series Mayberry R.F.D. Millie and Howard soon realized their incompatibility and mutually agreed to dissolve the relationship right before they were to wed.

Despite his awkwardness, Howard proved to be quite a sportsman. He caught "Old Sam", the much coveted legendary fish in Tucker's Lake, thus antagonizing the town's seasoned anglers. He also proved to be an excellent bowler, after joining Emmett Clark's bowling team and astonishing everyone by scoring a perfect game. Howard even parachuted from an airplane to appease a thrill-seeking lady friend.

Howard had two brushes with stardom. First he appeared on the "Colonel Tim's Talent Time" television show performing his stand-up comedy act, which consisted of personal affronts to his neighbors and "one-horse" jokes about Mayberry, causing him to be temporarily snubbed by the townsfolk. In the ''Mayberry R.F.D.'' episode "The Panel Show", the Mayberry city council sends Howard with Emmett Clark to a New York City TV station to promote traditional, small town values. Howard does a backspin and becomes an unabashed New Yorker, replete with a loud, paisley Nehru suit and hair bangs.

== Additional appearances ==
In the 1986 television movie Return to Mayberry, Howard was revisited (along with most of the surviving cast). In a funk about aging, the clerk was seen throughout the movie in various hues of hair color.

Dodson appeared in character as Howard Sprague on It's Garry Shandling's Show in the 1990 episode "The Day Howard Moved In".
