= Return to Mayberry =

1986 American television romantic comedy film

- Original airing print advertisement
- Genre: Comedy; Romance
- Written by: Harvey Bullock; Everett Greenbaum; Andy Griffith (uncredited)
- Directed by: Bob Sweeney
- Starring: Andy Griffith; Ron Howard; Don Knotts; Howard Morris; Jim Nabors; George Lindsey; Aneta Corsaut; Betty Lynn; Jack Dodson
- Theme music composer: Earle Hagen
- Country of origin: United States
- Original language: English

Production
- Executive producers: Andy Griffith; Dean Hargrove; Richard O. Linke
- Producer: Robin S. Clark
- Production locations: Los Olivos, California; Arroyo Grande, California
- Cinematography: Richard C. Glouner
- Editor: David Solomon
- Running time: 95 mins.
- Production companies: Strathmore Productions; Viacom Productions

Original release
- Network: NBC
- Release: April 13, 1986

Related
- The Andy Griffith Show; Mayberry R.F.D.

Return to Mayberry is a 1986 American made-for-television romantic comedy film based on the 1960s sitcoms The Andy Griffith Show and Mayberry R.F.D.. The film premiered on April 13, 1986, on NBC, and was the highest-rated television film of 1986. Sixteen of the original cast members reunited and reprised their roles for the film and its success could have led to additional Mayberry programs, but Griffith was committed to Matlock (also airing on NBC at the time) for the 1986–87 season.

Most of the characters from the old series are revisited. The slightly milquetoast Howard Sprague (Jack Dodson), in an attempt to look younger, is seen in various hues of hair color. Gomer Pyle (Jim Nabors), having returned to civilian life following his stint in the Marines, operates a local service station along with his cousin Goober (George Lindsey), and the pair is seen together for only the third time in the history of the franchise. (Note: They previously were shown together in The Andy Griffith Show episode "Fun Girls" and an episode of Gomer Pyle, U.S.M.C..) Howard Morris and Denver Pyle reprise the hillbilly roles of Ernest T. Bass and Briscoe Darling, respectively, along with Maggie Peterson and The Dillards as the rest of the Darling family. Otis Campbell (Hal Smith), the former town drunk, has become sober and now drives an ice cream truck. The film serves as the series finale to The Andy Griffith Show, as no further episodes were made to continue from where it left off.

== Plot ==
Having retired from a position as a postal inspector in Cleveland, Ohio, Andy Taylor (Andy Griffith) returns to his native Mayberry, North Carolina to see his son Opie (Ron Howard) become a first-time father. Andy also intends to run in the soon-to-be held sheriff's election. When Andy learns that his old deputy Barney Fife (Don Knotts), now back in Mayberry himself serving as acting sheriff, has announced his own candidacy, Andy admits to Opie that he won't run against Barney.

Barney tells Andy that he decided to run for sheriff because nobody else would. Andy mentions that Barney's old girlfriend Thelma Lou, now divorced, is back in Mayberry. As Barney leaves to teach a safety class at school, they encounter Ernest T. Bass who gives them a cryptic rhyme: "Your hair was brown but now it's gray; make that monster go away." The "monster" is an elaborate publicity stunt orchestrated by businessman Wally Butler (Richard Lineback), who bought a restaurant outside of town and added a hotel.

Andy goes to visit Aunt Bee's grave. At the cemetery, he sees Thelma Lou, visiting her uncle's gravesite. They visit the school where Barney is teaching. While Barney and Thelma Lou get reacquainted, Andy drives over to Opie and his wife Eunice's house just as she is about to go into labor. They are unable to get to the hospital in time, and Andy delivers his grandson in the back of the car.

The next day, Gomer and Goober are out fishing at Myers Lake when Gomer sees a monster stick its head up out of the water. Andy and Barney arrive shortly afterward, but Barney does not believe Gomer's story until viewing what looks like monster tracks in the mud. When Gomer later shows Barney a picture he took of Goober with something unidentifiable in the background, Barney becomes convinced a monster is in the lake.

With Barney's opponent Woods now running an aggressive campaign to discredit Barney, Howard, and Opie try to convince Andy to re-enter the race. Meanwhile, former town drunk Otis Campbell (Hal Smith), now long sober and driving an ice cream truck, is serving customers near Myers Lake when he sees the "monster" pop out of the lake. Otis races to the courthouse to tell Barney. Despite Andy's pleading with Barney to end his quest because people were laughing at him, Otis' report convinces Barney to resume the hunt for the monster.

At Butler's Inn, Andy notices a picture with a dragon's head in it. Remembering Ernest T.'s rhyme, Andy drives up to the Darlings' homestead, where Ernest T. now spends time. Briscoe Darling (Denver Pyle) and his daughter Charlene (Maggie Peterson) are delighted to see Andy. Andy manipulates Ernest T. into telling him when the monster will show up in Myers Lake again.

At the lake, while Barney baits a trap, Andy spots Ernest T. going into a nearby stone quarry shed. Butler arrives at the shed to futilely get Ernest T. to reel in the monster, but Andy catches both of them in the act. Barney and Howard follow Andy to the shed. Andy makes it seem that Barney plotted to make Butler overconfident and force his hand. Butler had found some old dragon artifacts, presumably left by the restaurant's former owners and hired Ernest T. to instigate a hoax at Myers Lake to attract customers. Howard takes pictures of Barney with the dragon's head for the newspaper, and Andy tells Butler about the legal consequences of his actions.

Later, at a campaign rally for Acting Sheriff Fife, Barney learns that Andy opted out of the sheriff's race to give Barney a better chance to win. He humbly asks the crowd to vote for Andy as a write-in candidate because "That's exactly what I'm gonna do." Andy is eventually elected sheriff, and promptly reappoints Barney as Deputy. Opie accepts a newspaper job in Binghamton, and Barney and Thelma Lou finally get married, with Ernest T. and the Darlings joining in the celebration.

The final shot (seen behind the end credits) is of Sheriff Taylor and Deputy Fife folding up an American flag at the end of the day on Mayberry's Main Street.

== Cast ==
- Andy Griffith as Andy Taylor
- Ron Howard as Opie Taylor
- Don Knotts as Barney Fife
- Jim Nabors as Gomer Pyle
- Aneta Corsaut as Helen Crump Taylor
- Jack Dodson as Howard Sprague
- George Lindsey as Goober Pyle
- Betty Lynn as Thelma Lou
- Howard Morris as Ernest T. Bass
- Maggie Peterson as Charlene Darling
- Denver Pyle as Briscoe Darling
- Hal Smith as Otis Campbell
- The Dillards (Rodney Dillard, Doug Dillard, Mitch Jayne, and Dean Webb) as The Darlings
- Richard Lineback as Wally Butler
- Karlene Crockett as Eunice Taylor
- Allen Williams as Lloyd Fox
- Paul Willson as Ben Woods
- Rance Howard as Preacher
- Robert Broyles as Wilson
- Karen Knotts as Opie's Receptionist

== Production ==
Most of the surviving cast members of The Andy Griffith Show reprised their roles in the reunion movie. One notable exception was Frances Bavier, who played Aunt Bee for all eight seasons as well as two seasons of Mayberry R.F.D. Bavier had retired shortly after leaving R.F.D. in 1970. Her absence was explained by a scene in which Andy visits the cemetery where Aunt Bee is buried, confirming that Aunt Bee is deceased. Aunt Bee is voiced by Janet Waldo in the scene. The official reason given for Bavier's absence was poor health (she died in 1989).

Rance Howard, Ron Howard's father, played the Preacher, and Karen Knotts, Don Knotts' daughter, played a receptionist.

Ron Howard, playing an adult Opie, had quit his acting career by this point to focus on being a film director, and had already directed the hit movies Night Shift (1982), Splash (1984) and Cocoon (1985). Return to Mayberry was the last significant acting role for Howard.

The Forty Acres backlot in Culver City, California, where most of the Mayberry exteriors were filmed in the original series, had been razed in 1976. For this movie, the town of Los Olivos, California doubled for Mayberry, with a stretch of Grand Avenue being used for the town square. A reconstruction of the original courthouse set was built in a small park at the corner of Grand and Alamo Pintado Avenues. The mid-intersection flagpole seen repeatedly in the movie is a veterans memorial that was built in Los Olivos shortly after World War I.

== Ratings and reception ==
Return to Mayberry premiered on April 13, 1986 at 9:00pm (ET/PT) as part of NBC Sunday Night at the Movies, and earned a Nielsen rating of 33.0, meaning around one-third of the TV-viewing public had tuned in to the broadcast. It became the top-rated made-for-TV movie of the 1985–86 season, and the second most-watched program that week (behind The Cosby Show).

Although Return to Mayberry was a ratings success, its critical reception was mixed. A review in The New York Times opined that its "slow pace, extremely modest level of humor and straightforward and predictable plotting make Return to Mayberry a less appealing reunion for the audience than it may have been for its actors." Time discussed the film only when it was in its last days of production, saying, "Even on TV's crowded reunion calendar, Return to Mayberry is a special event", but offering no substantive comment on the merits of the finished product.

More recent reviews have been kinder, calling it "marvelous blast from the past" and a reunion that "worked largely because the producers kept the original flavour of the series yet brought the show up to date".

== 2004 re-broadcast ==
Mayberry was rebroadcast on Veterans Day in 2004 by some ABC affiliates as a replacement for the network's unedited rebroadcast of the film Saving Private Ryan. Ryan included language which the Federal Communications Commission (FCC) had ruled "indecent and profane" in March 2004, and Mayberry was seen as a safer alternative, despite the fact that Ryan had already aired on the network in 2001 and 2002. The chief executive of Citadel Communications — the main affiliate owner to rebroadcast Mayberry — cited the recent 2004 U.S. presidential election as a justification. "We're just coming off an election where moral issues were cited as a reason by people voting one way or another", the executive said, "and, in my opinion, the commissioners are fearful of the new Congress." In the end, however, no complaints were lodged against ABC affiliates which showed Ryan, perhaps because even conservative watchdogs like the Parents Television Council supported the unedited rebroadcast of the film.

== Confusion with later reunion projects ==
In 2003, four surviving principal cast members (Griffith, Howard, Knotts, and Nabors) came together for a reunion special that featured the actors reminiscing about their time on the show. The production was interspersed with archival footage and short filmed interviews with some of the other surviving cast members. This special was called The Andy Griffith Show: Back to Mayberry. Some media outlets have occasionally called this show, too, Return to Mayberry, which led to some confusion between the two productions. The title, The Andy Griffith Show: Back to Mayberry, distinguishes this production from a 1993 production titled The Andy Griffith Show Reunion.

== Home media ==
The film was originally released on VHS in 1989 by Forum Home Video under license from Viacom (ASIN B001D1G5KY). A budget release from Video Treasures followed. It was released again in 1994 by Regent Entertainment (ASIN B0001JUGLI).

In 2007, the film was released on DVD as a bonus feature included with The Andy Griffith Show box set (ASIN B000NA21YA), in 2010 as a special feature on the DVD The Andy Griffith Show 50th Anniversary: The Best of Mayberry, and on Blu-ray in 2014 as a special feature on The Andy Griffith Show: Season 1.

It was released individually on DVD on June 13, 2017.
