= The Darlings =

Fictional family on The Andy Griffith Show

The Darlings are a fictional family of musically inclined hillbillies in the American TV sitcom The Andy Griffith Show.

== Overview ==
The Darlings (usually pronounced "Darlin's") lived in a mountain shack somewhere in the mountains neighboring Mayberry. The good-natured, but trouble-making Appalachian clan, led by patriarch Briscoe Darling (Denver Pyle) usually came into town when they had some sort of problem that Sheriff Andy Taylor had to resolve. Briscoe was the widowed father of five grown children (four sons and one daughter) who all lived together, and each had a different musical talent. All together, the members of the family formed a bluegrass band. They had their own set of values and rules and had little concern for matters that went on outside of their family. Due to their secluded lifestyle, their lack of social grace, and their superstitious belief in mountain lore, they were perceived by the people of Mayberry as being somewhat backward and ignorant. Their arrival in town usually meant trouble for Sheriff Taylor and Deputy Barney Fife, despite their friendly relationship with the family.

The Darlings made their first appearance on The Andy Griffith Show in episode #88, "The Darlings Are Coming". In their second appearance, episode #94, "Mountain Wedding", Andy and Barney must pay a visit to the Darlings' home to rid the family of Ernest T. Bass, a pesky neighbor with an affinity for rock throwing, who was intent on marrying Briscoe's daughter Charlene. Andy asked Briscoe if he and "the boys" couldn't take care of Ernest themselves, to which Briscoe laconically replied, "Well, we thought about killin' 'im... Kinda hated to go that far." Their appearance on the show was always supplemented by a song (provided by bluegrass band The Dillards, who played the Darling boys), usually with Andy accompanying them on guitar.

== Family members ==
=== Briscoe ===
Briscoe is the patriarch of the family, and was played by Denver Pyle. He describes himself as "Briscoe Darling, tiller of soil, feller of trees". Known for his gruff demeanor and poor manners, Briscoe would often make blunt or unintentionally offensive remarks due to his social ignorance. He wore a floppy hat and overalls to complement his scruffy appearance. He was also the leader of the family band, in which he played a ceramic jug (which he used to keep time by blowing across the opening). He once attempted to court Andy's Aunt Bee by kidnapping her, but called off the "engagement" when she tried to reform him.

=== Charlene Darling ===
Briscoe's only daughter, Charlene (Maggie Peterson) is an attractive but naïve young, blonde woman who often causes trouble for Sheriff Taylor and his family with her flirtatious behavior and her belief in mountain lore. She is also the original object of desire for Ernest T. Bass. She loves her husband, "Dud", but divorced him in a covert mountain ceremony because he looked at another woman. In that ceremony, she is also betrothed to Sheriff Taylor in which Andy unknowingly took part. The betrothal is later halted through the efforts of Deputy Fife's research into the customs of mountain marriage protocol, through an elaborate staging of a horse and rider passing by the couple. Charlene later has a baby daughter named "Andelina", whom she tried to betroth to Andy's son Opie, as was customary in her family. She occasionally sang when her father and brothers played music.

=== The Darling Boys ===
The bluegrass group The Dillards portrayed Briscoe's four sons. They almost never spoke and had a lifeless appearance. The names of the boys were contradictory from episode to episode: The original script of "Mountain Wedding" listed their names as Oether (pronounced Othor), Jebbin, Ward, and Frankie (although only Oether and Jebbin were ever used onscreen), but in a later episode, Andy refers to them as Mitch, Dean, Rodney, and Doug—the real first names of the members of The Dillards. However, they are generally referred to simply as "the boys", collectively. They were characterized by their silent, emotionless presence, and by their instrumentation in the family band: banjo (Doug Dillard), guitar (Rodney Dillard), mandolin (Dean Webb), and bass (Mitch Jayne). When they played, one usually sang lead and the others provided harmonies, while their father played rhythm on the jug.

In a running gag, Andy addresses them, and they return only a blank stare. Thus greeted in "Mountain Wedding", Andy remarked to Briscoe, "The boys are talkative today." Completely missing the irony, Briscoe admitted "They all keyed up" (over Ernest T. Bass's antics). Another time was when Charlene had a baby (Andelina) and Andy said, "You boys must be proud to be uncles." They did not respond. Briscoe answered, "They all choked up." A rare and funny line spoken by Dud was the suggestion "Hey, how 'bout playing 'Never Hit Your Gramma with a Great Big Stick'?" just before Charlene says, "Nah, Dud. That'n makes me cry." The only lines spoken by the Darling boys occur in the jail scene of the episode "The Darlings Are Coming". Mitch can be heard to say, "About to pop." Another line was spoken by Doug. He could be heard saying, "Great beans, Aunt Bee." Mitch Jayne's character always had a pipe in his mouth.

=== Dudley A. "Dud" Wash ===
Charlene's fiance and later husband, Dud had served three years in the U.S. Army, where he achieved the rank of private first class. He had been betrothed to Charlene since the age of five. Dud was originally portrayed by Hoke Howell as a well-mannered country boy. However, in Dud's final appearance, episode #121, "Divorce Mountain Style", Howell was curiously replaced by Bob Denver. Denver's portrayal was more along the lines of a wily, scrappy mountain man, akin to Ernest T. Bass, in contrast to Dud's original "good ol' boy" persona. At a 1995 convention, actor Hoke Howell explained the replacement as CBS's attempt to make Bob Denver a more familiar face, to promote his upcoming show, Gilligan's Island, despite the fact that Denver previously played Maynard G. Krebs on The Many Loves of Dobie Gillis. Dud was absent from the Darlings' later appearances.

The Darlings made their final appearance on The Andy Griffith Show in episode titled "The Darling Fortune". They made a total of six appearances throughout the show's run.

== Episodes featuring the Darlings ==
Season #	Episode #	Production #	Broadcast #	Airdate	Title
3	25	088	088	March 18, 1963	The Darlings Are Coming
3	31	094	094	April 29, 1963	Mountain Wedding
4	5	096	100	October 28, 1963	Briscoe Declares for Aunt Bee
4	25	121	120	March 30, 1964	Divorce, Mountain Style
5	12	139	139	December 7, 1964	The Darling Baby
7	6	193	195	October 17, 1966	The Darling Fortune

The Darling family (sans Dud) returned in the 1986 reunion movie, Return to Mayberry.

== Songs performed by the Darlings ==
- "Salty Dog"
- "Ebo Walker"
- "Dooley"
- "There is a Time"
- "Shady Grove"
- "Boil Them Cabbage Down"
- "Doug's Tune"
- "Stay all Night (Stay a Little Longer)"
- "Low and Lonely" (Production# 96 - Briscoe Declares for Aunt Bee)
- "Banjo in the Hollow" (called "Tearin' Up Your Old Clothes For Rags" on the show)
- "Ol' Joe Clark" (Played in key of D and E)
- "Leaning on the Everlasting Arms"
- "Whoa Mule"
- "Dueling Banjos"
