= Maggie Peterson =

American television actress (1941–2022)

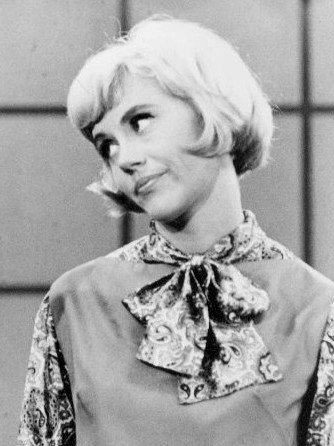
- Peterson on The Bill Dana Show in 1964
- Born: Margaret Ann Peterson; January 10, 1941; Greeley, Colorado, U.S.
- Died: May 15, 2022 (aged 81); Colorado, U.S.
- Other names: Maggie Mancuso
- Occupations: Actress; singer
- Years active: 1958–2022
- Known for: The Andy Griffith Show
- Spouse: Gus Mancuso (m. 1978; died 2021)
- Musical career
- Genres: Country, bluegrass
- Label: Capitol Records

Margaret Ann Peterson (January 10, 1941 – May 15, 2022) was an American actress and singer. She was best known for playing Charlene Darling on The Andy Griffith Show. She also played the character of Doris in the episode "A Girl for Goober" (1968).

== Life and career ==
The youngest of four children, Peterson was born in Greeley, Colorado, to Arthur and Tressa Hill Peterson. Her father was a doctor and her mother a homemaker. Aside from The Andy Griffith Show, Peterson also appeared on other TV shows, such as Love, American Style, Green Acres, Gomer Pyle USMC, and The Odd Couple. She appeared in an episode of Mayberry R.F.D. as Edna, a cafe waitress; in the 1986 film Return to Mayberry; as the innocent Rose Ellen in the 1969 film The Love God?, starring opposite Don Knotts; and in the 1968 film Angel in My Pocket.

Peterson landed a role as Susie, the coffee-shop waitress on The Bill Dana Show, another spin-off from The Danny Thomas Show, which aired from September 1963 to January 1965.

Peterson grew up in a musical family. While growing up in Colorado, she has said her earliest memories were of music. Peterson, her brother Jim, and two of Jim's friends formed a small group called the Ja-Da Quartet. They would ride around in the back of a pickup truck singing to people.

In 1954 at a Capitol Records convention, Dick Linke (manager of Andy Griffith and Jim Nabors) heard Peterson singing and was so impressed with her, he encouraged her to come to New York. So in 1958, after graduating high school, Peterson and the group did just that. They landed a number of stints on the Perry Como Show and the Pat Boone Show, and in 1959, they released their album It's the Most Happy Sound. Soon after, the band broke up and went back home.

A short time later, Peterson joined another group, the Ernie Mariani Trio (later renamed Margaret Ann and the Ernie Mariani Trio). The group traveled for several years and had stints in resort areas such as Las Vegas, Lake Tahoe, and Reno, where Frank Sinatra and the Rat Pack were often seen in the audience while Peterson performed. While she was on tour, Maggie was discovered by The Andy Griffith Show director Bob Sweeny and producer Aaron Ruben.

For The Andy Griffith Show, Peterson initially read for the role of Ellie Walker, a love interest for Sheriff Andy Taylor, but the role went to Elinor Donahue. Soon after, she was selected to play the role of Charlene Darling. The only daughter of Briscoe Darling, she had a crush on Sheriff Taylor ("Pa, can't I even just look at the pretty man?"). Peterson later returned to The Andy Griffith Show in its final season, in "A Girl for Goober," as Doris, who was the dating interest of Ken Berry's character.

The Darlings, including Briscoe's four boys (played by The Dillards bluegrass band), lived in the mountains and came to town on many occasions. When in town, they enjoyed playing music with Andy. One of Charlene's favorite songs is "Salty Dog." The ones that made her cry were "Slimy River Bottom," "Boil that Cabbage Down," and "Keep Your Money in Your Shoes and it Won't Get Wet." Ernest T. Bass had his eyes on Charlene and believed he had courting rights because her marriage to Dud Wash had been performed by Sheriff Andy Taylor acting as a justice of the peace, not by a preacher. He tried to steal her away on the day they were to be remarried by a preacher. Threatening the gathering with a high-powered rifle, he runs off with the fully veiled "bride." While Charlene and Dud are hurriedly married by the preacher, Ernest T. discovers the person in the veil is really Barney Fife. Charlene and Dud had a daughter together, Andilina. They tried to betroth Andilina to Opie, as it was customary in their family. Briscoe called off the engagement of Opie and Andilina when he discovered witchery was in the Taylor family.

According to Jim Clark of The Andy Griffith Show Rerun Watchers Club, the three songs on which Charlene performed on the show can be found on the album Songs That Make Me Cry.

In 1968, while she was singing as an opening act for Andy Griffith at a casino in Lake Tahoe, Peterson met jazz musician Ronald Bernard "Gus" Mancuso who was playing bass in a lounge act. The two married in 1978, and were together until his death in 2021. The couple spent a number of years in Los Angeles, where Peterson worked doing commercials, then settled in Las Vegas, where she worked as a location scout for film and television.

In 1969, she starred on the big screen as “Rose Ellen,” girlfriend to Don Knotts in the comedy movie The Love God?.

In April 2008, the Darlings received a star on the Missouri Walk of Fame in Marshfield, Missouri. Peterson and Darlings/Dillards band members Dean Webb and Mitch Jayne were on hand representing the Darlings.

In May 2016 and May 2019, Peterson appeared as a guest of honor at the Mayberry in the Midwest Festival in Danville, Indiana.

=== Death ===
Peterson died on May 15, 2022, at age 81. She had been in declining health following the death of her husband.
