= Thelma Lou =

- The Andy Griffith Show character
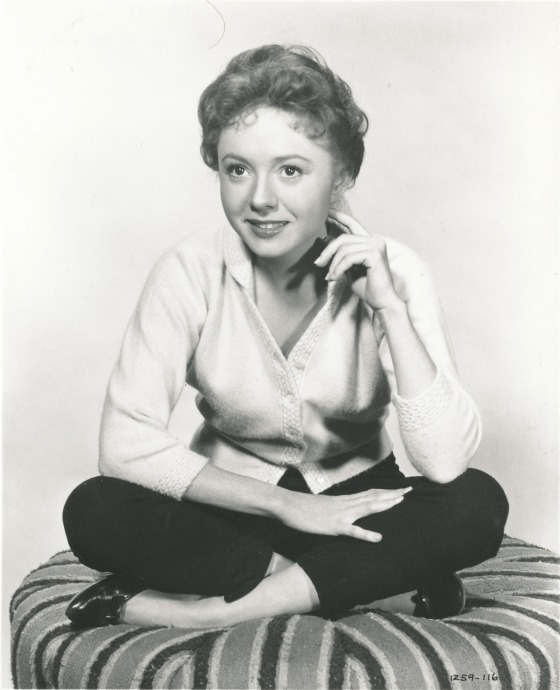
- Thelma Lou portrayed by Betty Lynn
- First appearance: "Cyrano Andy"; The Andy Griffith Show; March 6, 1961
- Last appearance: Return to Mayberry; April 13, 1986
- Portrayed by: Betty Lynn

In-universe information
- Full name: Thelma
- Nickname: Thel
- Spouses: Gerald Whitfield (1965-1966); Barney Fife (1986-?)
- Significant other: Barney Fife (boyfriend) (1961-1965)
- Children: None
- Relatives: Karen Moore (cousin); Mary Grace Gossage (cousin)

Thelma Lou, or Thel by boyfriend Barney Fife, is a character on the American television sitcom The Andy Griffith Show (1960-1968). The character appeared in 26 episodes, starting with the first-season episode, "Cyrano Andy". Thelma Lou was portrayed by Betty Lynn.

Thelma Lou lives in the community of Mayberry, North Carolina. She is Mayberry Deputy Sheriff Barney Fife's love interest. Thelma Lou appeared as a semiregular character in The Andy Griffith Show from 1961 until 1966, when the character was dropped from the show following the departure of Don Knotts and his Barney Fife character. She appeared in the 1986 reunion made-for-television movie, Return to Mayberry.

== Fictional character biography ==
Little is known about Thelma Lou. Barney met Thelma Lou at Wilton Blair's funeral in 1960. In another episode, she is mentioned to have attended Mayberry Union High, graduating in the same class with Barney and Andy Taylor. Aside from her romance with Barney, she was given very little character development during the series' run. She is generally portrayed as a sweet-natured, somewhat touchy, caring person who genuinely has an understanding of Barney, despite his unbecoming antics and personality problems. She sings in the choir. She is apparently self-sufficient; her occupation is never revealed despite references to a never-seen "office", yet she lives in a roomy and well-decorated house of her own. Like most Mayberry ladies, she is an accomplished cook, being especially celebrated for her "cashew fudge" (a favorite of Barney's).

Thelma Lou's last name is never given on the show, though in her last appearance on the series ("The Return of Barney Fife") she is married to a man named Gerald Whitfield. Actress Betty Lynn explained that "I didn't really need one, until about the fourth year, when Andy had to introduce me to a couple. And he turned to me during rehearsals, and Bob Sweeney was directing, and he said, 'Well, what's your last name? Thelma Lou what?' [laughs] And I said, 'No. I've been "Thelma Lou" all this time; I don't want a last name. ... All you have to do is say, "This is Thelma Lou." You don't need a last name.' So, he said, 'Okay.' And that was it." Prior to the arrival of Helen Crump in Mayberry, Lydia Crosswaithe is introduced as one of Thelma Lou's friends. Lydia's extremely odd personality doomed an effort by Barney and "Thel" to arrange a date and possible romantic match with Andy.

== Barney and Thelma Lou ==
The stability of Barney and Thelma Lou's relationship is questionable. Barney dates other women besides Thelma Lou (mainly, diner waitress Juanita, who is mentioned, but never seen or heard). In the second season episode “Barney and the Choir,” Barney opens the first scene singing the song "Juanita", only to have Thelma Lou appear in the next scene agreeing with Andy that Barney is tone deaf. In the season four episode "Barney and Thelma Lou, Phfftt," Barney reveals that he and Thelma Lou always go "Dutch treat" when they date, suggesting Barney has never paid for her meals.

The two broke up in one episode when Barney pays a bit too much attention to an attractive newcomer to Mayberry. Despite their ups and downs, Thelma Lou stated that Barney was the man she wanted to marry and be the father of her children, and Barney once told Thelma Lou, "You're the only one I ever gave a hoot for." He also tells her "You're the cat's" (as in "cat's meow"). A running gag on the show involved Barney and Thelma Lou spending a "quiet evening together" and somebody (usually Andy) walking in on them to find Barney's hair mussed and lipstick prints all over his face.

Barney and Thelma Lou went their separate ways when Barney left Mayberry to join the Raleigh police force (coinciding with Don Knotts's departure from the series in 1965). In the sixth-season episode, "The Return of Barney Fife", Barney returns to Mayberry for a high-school reunion. Intent on getting back with Thelma Lou, Barney discovers she has been married six weeks to a man named Gerald Whitfield. Betty Lynn recounted that she so strongly objected to her character being married to anyone other than Barney that while performing in the episode, she pretended that Whitfield was actually a co-worker who she paid to pretend to be her husband so that she wouldn't "be left in a lurch" with Barney. This episode is Thelma Lou's final appearance on the series.

Thelma Lou appears in the 1986 television reunion movie Return to Mayberry. Her marriage in 1965 is revealed to have lasted only a year before ending in divorce. Barney finally marries Thelma Lou.

== Andy Griffith Show appearances ==
The following is a list of Andy Griffith Show episodes featuring Thelma Lou.

Season one

- Episode 22: "Cyrano Andy"
- Episode 30: "Barney Gets His Man"

Season two

- Episode 2: "Barney's Replacement"
- Episode 5: "Barney on the Rebound"
- Episode 8: "The Perfect Female"
- Episode 13: "The Farmer Takes a Wife"
- Episode 20: "Barney and the Choir"
- Episode 27: "Three's a Crowd"

Season three

- Episode 2: "Andy's Rich Girlfriend"
- Episode 6: "Barney Mends a Broken Heart"
- Episode 27: "Barney's First Car"
- Episode 28: "The Rivals"
- Episode 29: "A Wife for Andy"

Season four

- Episode 9: "A Date for Gomer"
- Episode 10: "Up in Barney's Room"
- Episode 13: "Barney and the Cave Rescue"
- Episode 27: "Fun Girls"
- Episode 29: "The Rumor"
- Episode 30: "Barney and Thelma Lou, Phfftt"

Season five

- Episode 2: "Barney's Physical"
- Episode 7: "Man in the Middle"
- Episode 19: "The Lucky Letter"
- Episode 20: "Goober and the Art of Love"
- Episode 21: "Barney Runs for Sheriff"
- Episode 28: "The Arrest of the Fun Girls"

Season six

- Episode 17: "The Return of Barney Fife"
