= Survival City =

1955 film

- Directed by: Anthony Muto
- Produced by: Edmund Reek
- Distributed by: 20th Century Fox
- Release date: September 1955
- Running time: 20 minutes
- Country: United States
- Language: English

Survival City is a 1955 American short documentary film directed by Anthony Muto. The film depicts the effect of an atomic bomb on an American town.

== Reception ==
The Monthly Film Bulletin wrote: "A screen record of an atomic bomb test in the Nevada Desert, showing the construction of the village to be destroyed, and the degrees of damage sustained by various types of building – wood, brick, concrete, etc. – at varying distances from the point of detonation. This is, in effect, a civil defence propaganda document, and it demonstrates graphically and alarmingly some of the effects of an atomic explosion; an extra turn of the screw is provided by the shots of wax models, placed in position in the houses and streets before the tests, and hideously burnt and dismembered after it. The tone of the commentary, portentous, exhortatory, and at times injudiciously jocular, is notably unsympathetic."

Kine Weekly wrote: "Sponsored by the U.S federal civil defence organisation, this is a vivid and frankly terrifying record of 'operation Q,' an atom bomb test in Nevada costing a million dollars. The various buildings and shelters a mile or more away are shown after the explosion and in various degrees of wreck afterwards. Included are wax effigies of a family, giving a curiously added: horror; despite the 'U' label, this is bad stuff for young children. Forceful commentary stresses 'your property' and 'our' experiment, but the film is one to make humanity pause anywhere and is a warning documentary of shattering force and vital appeal. Momentous offering for any audience."

== Accolades ==
In 1956, at the 28th Academy Awards, the film won an Oscar for Best Short Subject (One-Reel).
