= Ernest T. Bass =

- The Andy Griffith Show character
- Howard Morris as Ernest T. Bass, 1964.
- First appearance: "Mountain Wedding"; The Andy Griffith Show; April 29, 1963
- Last appearance: Return to Mayberry; April 13, 1986
- Portrayed by: Howard Morris

In-universe information
- Significant others: Charlene Darling (disputed); Ramona Ankrum

Ernest T. Bass is a fictional character on the American TV sitcom The Andy Griffith Show. He was played by Howard Morris.

As with many of the show's characters, Morris had worked previously with other members of the cast and crew. He had worked with Aaron Ruben and Everett Greenbaum on Caesar's Hour.

== Character overview ==
Ernest T. Bass is a loud, wild, and rowdy hillbilly with a scruffy, unkempt appearance, a maniacal laugh, and a penchant for troublemaking. He nearly always behaves in an immature childish manner and is often rude and belligerent. His appearance within the otherwise sedate town of Mayberry is a sign that trouble will soon be coming for Sheriff Taylor and Deputy Barney Fife. Once in a while, he appears in town with his trademark greeting, "Howdy-do to you and you. It's me, it's me, it's Ernest T.!"

Ernest T. frequently vandalizes people's property by hurling rocks through glass windows — an act which he himself takes a great deal of personal pride in, calling himself "the best rock thrower in the county." He is notoriously importunate with the women he desires, and regularly uses this tactic to get their attention. He also tries to impress people by informing them that he is saving up for a gold tooth. He once boasted that he had lifted a mule onto his shoulders and "tote' her five miles to the doctor," an impressive feat of strength (if true). When threatened with the law, he is adept at eluding Sheriff Taylor and Deputy Fife, taunting them with his famous catchphrase, "You ain't seen the las' of Ernest T. Bass!" His general behavior is summed up succinctly (and repeatedly) by Barney: "He's a nut!"

Despite Ernest's checkered past and his generally rude ways, Andy more than once takes Ernest T. under his wing and tries to educate him in the ways of the world. One time, Andy tries to turn Ernest T. into a presentable gentleman. He takes him to Mrs. Wiley's party and tries to pass him off as his cousin, Oliver Gossage. This episode is a comedic parody of My Fair Lady.

Ernest T. Bass first appears near the end of the third season in the episode "Mountain Wedding". He has his mind set on marrying Briscoe Darling's daughter Charlene, despite the fact that she is already married to Dud Wash. He says the wedding was not legitimate because there was no preacher, so he still has a chance. He breaks the Darlings' window in the middle of the night, and then attempts to serenade Charlene by performing a sort of spoken-word song called "Old Aunt Mariah," accompanied by drumming a gas can, which he "tuned" by tightening and loosening the cap. The family then decides to conduct a faked wedding, to which Ernest T. reacts by devising a nefarious plan to steal the bride, only to discover that it was Barney in disguise.

In Episode #133, "The Education of Ernest T. Bass", he tries to impress his love interest Ramona (whom he always calls "Romena") by getting an education. It is revealed that he cannot read or write, except for a few posted signs around town and in the hills. (This is somewhat contradictory to earlier episodes, in which he often throws rocks with written notes attached.) Ernest T. attends Helen Crump's elementary school class, where he quickly becomes an obnoxious nuisance. After she smacks him with a ruler for being disruptive, Ernest T. begins to bond with Miss Crump, calling her his "mother figure," in his signature drawl. Fed up, Helen decides (on Andy's advice) to graduate Ernest T., despite the fact that he didn't complete his education. She gives him his "diploma," which is simply a certificate stating that he knows some arithmetic, can read and write some words, and knows the boundaries of the United States. In a touching ceremony, she announces that Ernest T. Bass has received his diploma for "learning".

Ernest T. Bass' final appearance was in Episode #162, "Malcolm at the Crossroads." He is fired as a crossing guard in favor of Malcolm Merriweather, played by Bernard Fox. When Bass first saw Malcolm on the job, he said, "Looks like a octopus!" When he learns Malcolm is from England, Ernest swears a blood feud based on his Irish ancestors' history of British oppression. Bass challenges “the English-ter” Malcolm to a duel to end the feud until Andy convinces Bass that Malcolm's mother was born in County Cork.

Despite appearing in only five episodes during the series' entire run, Ernest T. Bass is one of The Andy Griffith Show's best remembered characters, and remains a fan favorite. Morris, along with Griffith, Knotts, and many other cast members reprised his role in the 1986 TV movie Return to Mayberry.
