= Anthony Muto (director) =

American film director (1904–1964)

Anyhony Muto (1904–May 25, 1964) was a film director and producer in the United States. His films include the Academy Award winning short Survival City about the effects of an atomic bomb hitting an American town.

Muto attended Ohio Northern University and afterwards began his career at the New York Telegram in 1922. He worked for 20th Century Fox. He headed its Movietone News Bureau. He oversaw the production of its newsreels filmed in South America promoting U.S. interests.

== Filmography ==
- The Holy Year at the Vatican (1950), director
- Carioca Carnival (1955), a documentary on Rio de Janeiro
- Survival City (1955)
- A Nice Little Bank That Should Be Robbed (1958), producer
