= Champions Carry On =

1943 film

- Produced by: Edmund Reek
- Distributed by: Twentieth Century Fox
- Release date: 1943
- Running time: 10 minutes
- Country: United States
- Language: English

Champions Carry On is a 1943 American short documentary film about how American sports figures were contributing to the war effort, produced by Edmund Reek. It was nominated for an Academy Award at the 16th Academy Awards for Best Short Subject (One-Reel).
