= A Nice Little Bank That Should Be Robbed =

1958 film by Henry Levin

- Theatrical release poster
- Directed by: Henry Levin
- Written by: Sydney Boehm
- Produced by: Anthony Muto
- Starring: Tom Ewell; Mickey Rooney; Mickey Shaughnessy; Dina Merrill; Madge Kennedy; Frances Bavier
- Cinematography: Leo Tover
- Edited by: Hugh S. Fowler
- Production company: 20th Century-Fox
- Distributed by: 20th Century-Fox
- Release date: December 1, 1958
- Running time: 87 minutes
- Country: United States
- Language: English

A Nice Little Bank That Should Be Robbed is a 1958 American comedy film directed by Henry Levin and written by Sydney Boehm. The film stars Tom Ewell, Mickey Rooney, Mickey Shaughnessy, Dina Merrill, Madge Kennedy and Frances Bavier. The film was released on December 1, 1958, by 20th Century-Fox.

== Plot ==
Auto mechanic Max Rutgers is spinning his wheels, going nowhere. He has been promising sweetheart Margie Solitaire for five years that they will marry, but wishes he had more money to support her.

His best pal, Gus Harris, knows a lot about racehorses, but keeps flunking his exam to become a licensed trainer. Fed up, he and Max decide to rob a bank, succeeding in a heist of $28,000. They use the money to buy a horse, Tattooed Man, but an acquaintance, cabbie and bookie Rocky Baker, figures out how they got the money and wants to be cut in on a share.

Max and Gus bet their life savings on Tattooed Man's next race. When their horse is victorious, only to be disqualified for a rules infraction, they become desperate and decide to rob another bank. A series of errors ensues, teller Grace Havens being held hostage, the vault being on a timer and unable to be opened until morning, and bank manager Schroeder coming along for the ride in his own vehicle when the getaway car they stole from Margie isn't there.

The police ultimately trace the thieves to Margie's house and take the crooks into custody. Max, Gus and Rocky are behind bars together when they hear a radio broadcast of a big race that Tattooed Man wins.

== Cast ==
- Tom Ewell as Max Rutgers
- Mickey Rooney as Gus Harris
- Mickey Shaughnessy as Harold 'Rocky' Baker
- Dina Merrill as Margie Solitaire
- Madge Kennedy as Grace Havens
- Frances Bavier as Mrs. Solitaire
- Richard Deacon as Milburn Schroeder
- Stanley Clements as Fitz
- John Doucette as Grayson
