= Why Korea? =

1950 American documentary

- Written by: Ulric Bell
- Produced by: Edmund Reek
- Narrated by: Joe King
- Production company: Movietone News
- Distributed by: 20th Century Fox
- Release date: 1950
- Running time: 30 minutes
- Country: United States
- Language: English

Why Korea? is a 1950 American short documentary film produced by Edmund Reek at the request of the Secretary of Defense Louis Johnson and used newsreel footage to explain the Korean War. In 1951, it won an Oscar for Documentary Short Subject at the 23rd Academy Awards. The Academy Film Archive preserved Why Korea? in 2005.

== Cast ==
- Joe King as Narrator
