= Symphony of a City =

1947 film

- Directed by: Arne Sucksdorff
- Written by: Arne Sucksdorff
- Produced by: Edmund Reek
- Cinematography: Arne Sucksdorff
- Release date: 15 August 1947
- Running time: 18 minutes
- Country: Sweden
- Language: Swedish

Symphony of a City (Swedish: Människor i stad, also known as Rhythm of a City, Stockholm Story and People in the City) is a 1947 Swedish documentary short film about Stockholm, directed and written by Arne Sucksdorff. It won an Oscar in 1949 for Best Short Subject (One-Reel).
