= Edmund Reek =

American newsreel producer

Edmund Reek (19 March 1897 – 28 October 1971) was a producer of newsreels in the United States. Several of his films were nominated for best short film Academy Awards and some won. He arranged for a newsreel to capture images of Pearl Harbor.

A letter to him from Bill Burch survives.

== Academy Awards ==
| Year | Title | Category | Won | Ref. |
|---|---|---|---|---|
| 1943 | Champions Carry On | Best Live Action Short Film | No | |
| 1944 | Blue Grass Gentleman | Best Live Action Short Film | No | |
| 1945 | Along The Rainbow Trails | Best Live Action Short Film | No | |
| 1946 | Golden Horsed | Best Live Action Short Film | No | |
| 1948 | Symphony of a City | Best Live Action Short Film | Yes | |
| 1950 | Why Korea? | Best Documentary (Short Subject) | Yes | |
| 1955 | Survival City | Best Live Action Short Film | Yes | |

== Filmography ==
- Champions Carry On (1943), about athletes' support for war efforts
- Blue Grass Gentleman (1944)
- Along the Rainbow Trail (1946)
- Golden Horses (1946)
- Symphony of a City (1949), about Stockholm, Sweden
- Why Korea? (1950), about the Korean War
- Survival City (1955), about the effects of an atomic bomb hitting an American town
