= Hope Summers =

American actress (1902–1979)

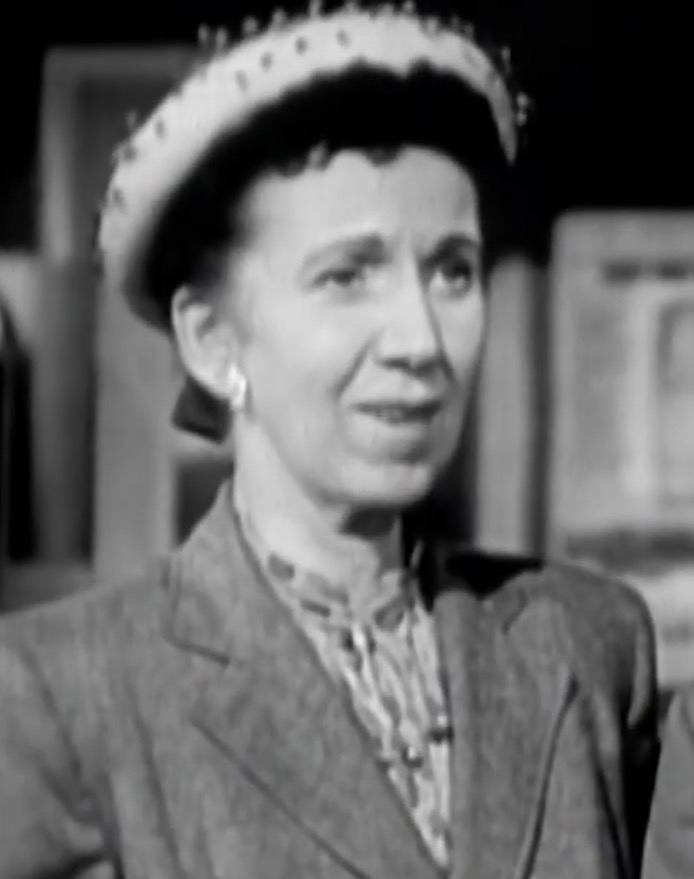
- Hope Summers in Trader Thorne
- Born: Sarah Hope Summers; June 7, 1902; Mattoon, Illinois, U.S.
- Died: June 22, 1979 (aged 77); Woodland Hills, Los Angeles, California, U.S.
- Other name: Hope Sommers
- Occupation: Actress
- Years active: 1950–1978
- Spouse: Claude James Witherell (m. 1927; died 1967)
- Children: 2
- Father: John W. Summers

Sarah Hope Summers (June 7, 1902 – June 22, 1979) was an American actress known for her work on The Andy Griffith Show and Mayberry R.F.D., portraying Clara Edwards.

== Early life ==
Hope Summers was born in Mattoon, Illinois, the daughter of the town doctor and future U.S. Representative John W. Summers, and Jennie (née Burks). She was raised in Illinois and later in Walla Walla, Washington, where her father was elected to the House. Summers attended Northwestern University, graduating in 1923 from its Northwestern School of Speech. She stayed in Evanston, teaching speech and diction, then moved to Peoria, Illinois in 1926 when she became the head of the Speech Department at Bradley University. While in Peoria, Summers started giving private acting lessons and became involved as a volunteer, and soon a director, in local theatre.

== Acting career ==
Summers was a regional actress, who often performed in one-woman shows starting in the 1930s. In radio, she had parts in the anthology Destination Freedom, a series written by Richard Durham, dedicated to the retelling the lives of notable Negros in the Americas. Summers did not break into network television until her late 40s when she made her debut in 1951 on the soap opera Hawkins Falls, broadcast from Chicago. While she had a few uncredited background roles in short films, she did not make her first Hollywood feature film until 1957, with a small credited role in Zero Hour!. She continued in films as a character player.

Summers first attracted attention in 1958 in the semi-regular role as shopkeeper Hattie Denton on the Western series The Rifleman, starring Chuck Connors. She guest-starred on dozens of series, including Maverick, Wagon Train, State Trooper, Rescue 8, Peter Gunn, Dennis the Menace, It's a Man's World, Mr. Smith Goes to Washington, Hazel, Gunsmoke, The Danny Thomas Show, M*A*S*H, My Three Sons, Petticoat Junction, Love on a Rooftop, The Pruitts of Southampton, The Second Hundred Years, Adam-12 and The Paul Lynde Show, and was a regular in the cast of the short-lived 1978 sitcom, Another Day. She made 36 appearances on The Andy Griffith Show, playing Aunt Bee's best friend, during the 1960s, and made five appearances on the post-Griffith spinoff Mayberry R.F.D..

While her film work usually was in small parts, often unbilled, she had a credited part as Mrs. Gilmore, one of the members of the witches' coven at the heart of Roman Polanski's 1968 film Rosemary's Baby.

For nearly 20 years, from 1961 until her death, Summers was the voice of Mrs. Butterworth in commercials for Mrs. Butterworth's.

== Personal life ==
Summers met local businessman Claude James Witherell in 1926, the year she moved to Peoria to teach; the couple married in 1927 and had two children.

== Filmography ==
Year	Title	Role	Notes
1951–1952	Hawkins Falls	Belinda Catherwood	Unknown episodes
1956	Alfred Hitchcock Presents	Marie Tallendier	Season 1 Episode 24: "The Perfect Murder"
1957	Alfred Hitchcock Presents	Mrs. Gillespie's Housekeeper / Maid	Season 2 Episode 22: "The End of Indian Summer"
1957	Private Secretary	Della Loganbury	Episode: "Not Quite Paradise"
1957	Zero Hour!	Mrs. Summers	
1957	Wagon Train	Unnamed passenger	Episode: "The Ruth Owens Story"
1958	Gunsmoke	Ellen Cade	Episode: "Gypsum Hills Feud”
1958	Wagon Train	Mae O'Malley	Episode: "The Luke O'Malley Story"
1958	I Want to Live!	Ethel, Policewoman on bus	Uncredited
1958–1960	The Rifleman	Hattie Denton	16 episodes
1959	Maverick	Martha Abbott	Episode: "Brasada Spur"
1959	Rescue 8	Dora	Episode: "If the Bough Breaks"
1959	Hound-Dog Man	Jewell Crouch	
1959	Edge of Eternity	Motel Attendant	Uncredited
1960	Inherit the Wind	Mrs. Krebs - Righteous Townswoman	
1960	Gunsmoke	Della Bass	Episode: “Old Fool”
1961	Parrish	Mary	Uncredited
1961	Angel Baby	Woman at Revival Meeting	Uncredited
1961	Homicidal	Mrs. Martha Adrims	Uncredited
1961	Claudelle Inglish	Ernestine Peasley	Uncredited
1961	The Children's Hour	Agatha (Tilford's maid)	Alternative title: The Loudest Whisper
1961–1968	The Andy Griffith Show	Clara Edwards/Clara Johnson/Bertha Edwards	32 episodes
1962	The Couch	Mrs. Quimby	
1962	Rome Adventure	Mrs. St. Uwell	Uncredited; Alternative title: Lovers Must Learn
1962	It's a Man's World	The Salvation Army Woman	Episode: "Drive over to Exeter"
1963	Spencer's Mountain	Mother Ida	
1963	Gunsmoke	Jen	Episode: "Legends Don't Sleep"
1964	My Living Doll	Edwina	Episode: "I'll Leave It to You"
1964	One Man's Way	Mrs. Elwood Thompson	
1964	Hazel	Edna	Episode: "Hot Potato a la Hazel"
1965	The Hallelujah Trail	Mrs. Hasselrad	
1965	Petticoat Junction	Mabel Denton	Episode: "The Crowded Wedding Ring"
1966	The Ghost and Mr. Chicken	Suzanna Blush	Uncredited
1966	Penelope	Shop Lady	Uncredited
1968–1970	Mayberry R.F.D.	Clara Edwards	5 episodes
1968	Rosemary's Baby	Mrs. Gilmore	
1968	The Shakiest Gun in the West	Celia	
1968	5 Card Stud	Female customer in general store	Uncredited
1969	The Learning Tree	Mrs. Kiner	
1970	Marcus Welby, M.D.	Mrs. Whittaker	Episode: "Epidemic"
1970	Bewitched	Carolyn	Episode: "Samantha's Old Man"
1971	Hawaii Five-O	Minnie Leona Moroney	Episode: "The Bomber and Mrs. Moroney"
1972	Get to Know Your Rabbit	Mrs. Beeman	
1972	Where Does It Hurt?	Nurse Throttle	
1973	Ace Eli and Rodger of the Skies	Laura	
1973	M*A*S*H	Nurse Meg Cratty	Episode: "The Trial of Henry Blake"
1973	Charley Varrick	Mess Vesta	Alternative title: Kill Charley Varrick
1974	Our Time	Biology Teacher	Starsky and Hutch
1975	Chico and the Man	Lucille Nelson	Episode: "Garage Sale"
1975	Welcome Back, Kotter	Ms. Riley	Episode: "Mr. Kotter, Teacher"
1975	Starsky and Hutch	Sarah Wilson	Episode: "Savage Sunday"
1976	Little House on the Prairie	Addie Bjornesen	Episode: "The Collection"
1977	Evil Town	Alice Wylie	
1978	Another Day	Olive Gardner	Regular cast member (4 episodes)
1978	Foul Play	Ethel	
1978	Smokey and the Good Time Outlaws	Marcie	(final film role)
