= The Love God? =

1969 film directed by Nat Hiken

- The theatrical poster for The Love God?
- Directed by: Nat Hiken
- Written by: Nat Hiken
- Produced by: Edward Montagne
- Starring: Don Knotts; Edmond O'Brien; Anne Francis
- Cinematography: William Margulies
- Edited by: Sam E. Waxman
- Music by: Vic Mizzy
- Distributed by: Universal Pictures
- Release date: August 1969
- Running time: 101 minutes
- Country: United States
- Language: English

The Love God? is a 1969 American comedy film starring Don Knotts and Edmond O'Brien. It was written and directed by Nat Hiken, who died between the completion of shooting and the film's release. The Love God? marked a change of pace for Knotts, who had exclusively appeared in family comedies, and was an attempt to integrate Knotts into the adult-oriented films that dominated the late 1960s and early 1970s.

== Plot ==
Abner Peacock's beloved birdwatching magazine The Peacock is in financial crisis. Desperate to stay afloat, Abner takes on new partner Osborn Tremain, who has an agenda of his own: to publish a sexy men's magazine. Tremain and his wife Evelyn can only do so by taking over Abner's magazine, as Tremain has been convicted for sending obscene material through the mail.

Before Abner can stop the Tremains, the first issue sells more than 40 million copies and Abner becomes the unwilling spokesman for First Amendment rights. Swept up in adulation, Abner soon adopts the swinging bachelor lifestyle.

== Cast ==
- Don Knotts as Abner Audubon Peacock IV
- Anne Francis as Lisa LaMonica
- Edmond O'Brien as Osborn Tremain
- James Gregory as Darrell Evans Hughes
- Maureen Arthur as Evelyn Tremain
- Maggie Peterson as Rose Ellen Wilkerson

== Reception ==
Los Angeles Times critic Kevin Thomas called the film "one of the intentionally funniest and most pertinent pictures to come out of Universal in years."

In the San Francisco Examiner, Stanley Eichelbaum described the film as "an engaging spoof on the current vogue for the sexual put on."

According to Don Knotts, resistance to seeing him in anything other than clean family films was greater than Universal Pictures had anticipated, and they had trouble booking The Love God? in theaters: "I'm not sure how many, but I heard that a great number of theaters turned the picture down. In any case, it did not do well at all." The film was rated M (for "Mature Audiences", later replaced with PG) by the Motion Picture Association when it was released. In later years, changes to the film rating system meant that this rating was no longer considered sufficient for The Love God?, so the film's rating was bumped up to PG-13 (for "Parents Strongly Cautioned") and given the flag "sex-related material."

The film was panned by Judith Crist when it premiered on television. She said that its "smutty pseudo-satire on pornography, civil liberties and bird-watching would be rated as sub-Z by anyone with a knowledge of the alphabet, let alone an iota of taste."
