= Betty Lynn =

American actress (1926–2021)

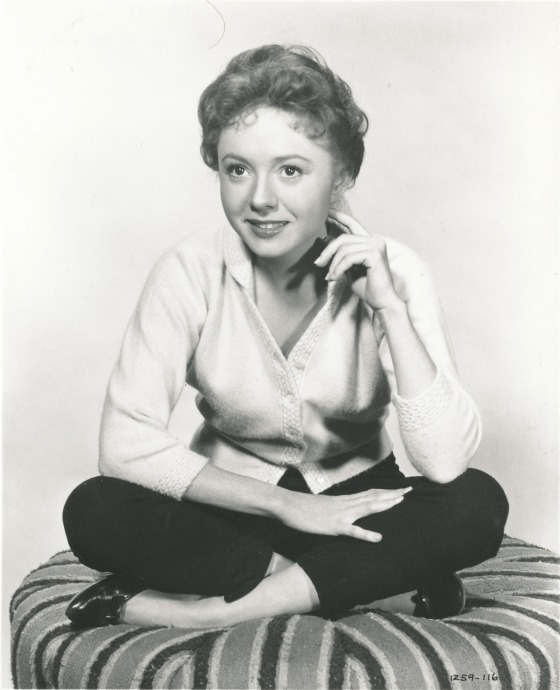
- Publicity image of Lynn on The Andy Griffith Show, c. 1960
- Born: Elizabeth Ann Theresa Lynn; August 29, 1926; Kansas City, Missouri, U.S.
- Died: October 16, 2021 (aged 95); Mount Airy, North Carolina, U.S.
- Other name: Betty Ann Lynn
- Occupation: Actress
- Years active: 1948–2006
- Known for: Portraying Thelma Lou on The Andy Griffith Show

Elizabeth Ann Theresa Lynn (August 29, 1926 – October 16, 2021) was an American actress. She played Thelma Lou, Deputy Barney Fife's girlfriend, on The Andy Griffith Show. During the 1940s and 1950s, she appeared in many films, including Sitting Pretty (1948), June Bride (1948), the original Cheaper by the Dozen (1950), and Meet Me in Las Vegas (1956). She also played a major role in an episode of the television series Little House on the Prairie.

== Early life ==
Born in Kansas City, Missouri, in 1926, Betty Lynn was the only child of Elizabeth Ann (née Lynn) and George A. Dailey. Her father was a civil engineer, who worked as a municipal employee for Kansas City and later as a private contractor. Her mother, described as "an accomplished mezzo-soprano", taught Betty in her early childhood to sing and enrolled her in the Kansas City Conservatory of Music when she was only five years old. Prior to that, according to federal census records, her parents had separated and divorced before April 1930. Their marriage is reported to have been tumultuous, with allegations that her father once threatened to shoot her mother in the abdomen when she was pregnant, and that after Betty's birth, he made more threats that forced her mother on one occasion to hide in a locked closet to protect her baby and herself.

Following her mother's breakup with Dailey, young Betty had little personal contact with her father. She went with her mother to live with her mother's parents, Josie (née Hill) and George Andrew Lynn, who also resided in Kansas City. Betty's grandfather, a railroad engineer, effectively served as her father figure from then until his death in Sacramento, California, in 1959.

== USO tour ==
When she was 17, Lynn auditioned to participate in United Service Organizations entertainment. At age 18, she was part of a USO tour in the China Burma India Theater during World War II. She realized the gravity of the situation when a Marine gave her a pistol, saying, "You might need this."

Her activities on the tour included visiting patients in hospitals and singing requests from a repertoire of 725 songs, her primary mission to entertain and console wounded servicemen in military hospitals. She also met recently released prisoners of war from Rangoon, and she was told by a doctor, "Most of them will be out of their minds in six months."

== Acting career ==
Betty Lynn began her acting career in radio as a member of the cast on a daytime drama on a station in Kansas City.

On Broadway, she appeared in Walk with Music (1940), Oklahoma! (1943), and Park Avenue (1946). She was discovered in a Broadway production by Darryl F. Zanuck and signed to 20th Century Fox. A clause in her contract allowed the studio to drop her at six-month intervals, leading to recurring concerns for Lynn. She said, "I was a redhead with freckles and didn't have a bosom. I prayed so hard they’d keep picking me up."

Lynn made her film debut in the 1948 film Sitting Pretty, which won a Photoplay Gold Medal. That same year, she appeared in June Bride with Bette Davis, followed by roles in Mother Is a Freshman (1949), Cheaper by the Dozen (1950), and Payment on Demand (1951).

Lynn replaced Patricia Kirkland in the role of Betty Blake in the CBS comedy, The Egg and I (1951–1952), and she played Pearl in the ABC comedy Love That Jill (1958). During this time, she became a neighbor to an infant Mark Evanier, whom she said became a close friend.

She was Viola Slaughter in the ABC Western Texas John Slaughter (1958–1962). In the 1953–1954 television season, Lynn was cast as June Wallace, the sister-in-law of Ray Bolger's character on the ABC sitcom Where's Raymond?

After guest-starring on various television series, including Schlitz Playhouse of Stars, The Gale Storm Show, Sugarfoot, and Markham, Lynn won the role of Thelma Lou on The Andy Griffith Show. Despite playing the role for five years (1961–1966), she appeared in only 26 episodes, and was never signed on to the show (in part because at the time she was cast, she was still under contract for Texas John Slaughter). She recounted, "I didn't want to leave Thelma Lou. I really loved her. I enjoyed her. She was sweet and kind, she was so fun to play, and I loved working with Don Knotts — he was so wonderful." Following the end of The Andy Griffith Show, Lynn continued appearing in various television and film roles. In 1986 she joined her former Andy Griffith Show castmates for the NBC reunion movie Return to Mayberry, in which Thelma Lou finally married Barney Fife.

In 2006, Lynn retired from acting and relocated to Mount Airy, North Carolina, the hometown of Andy Griffith and the town that Mayberry was based on.

== Personal life ==
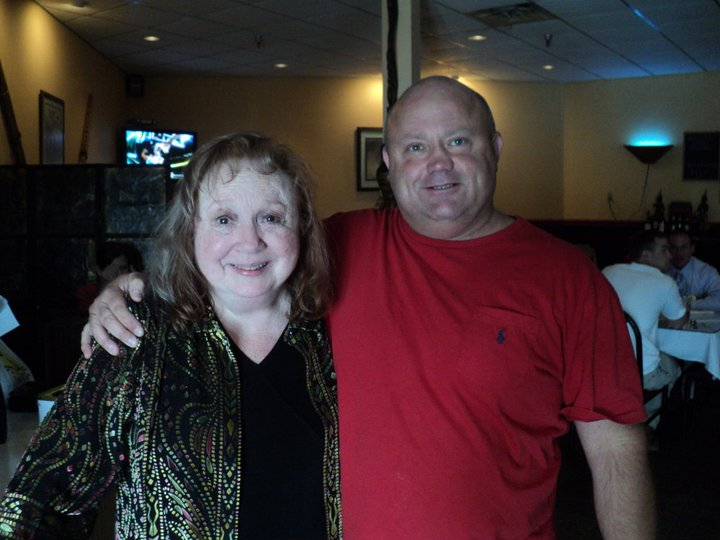
Lynn with Ian Oliver Martin on April 18, 2011.

In 1950 in Los Angeles, Lynn bought a house, where her mother and grandparents moved in and lived with her for years. She thus assumed the off-screen roles of breadwinner and caretaker.

Lynn never married, although she stated she was once engaged. By July 2019, she was residing in Mount Airy, North Carolina, and continued to make monthly personal appearances in town at the Andy Griffith Museum, signing autographs and meeting with her fans. Lynn once commented, "The longer I live here, the more I see things [Griffith] took from his hometown."

A devout Roman Catholic, Lynn regularly attended St. Timothy's Catholic Church in Los Angeles, and after her move to Mount Airy, she joined the local Holy Angels Catholic Church.

After a brief illness, Lynn died in October 2021 at the age of 95. At the time of her death, she was working on her autobiography, which was set to be released posthumously. In response to her death, Ron Howard of The Andy Griffith Show wrote about Lynn's cheerful personality both on set and away from the cameras:

"RIP Betty Lynn. She played Thelma Lou on #TAGS & brightened every scene she was in & every shooting day she was on set. I saw her last a few years ago where she still lit up the room with her positivity. It was great to have known and worked with her. She truly was 95 yrs young".

== Honors ==
Lynn was inducted into the Missouri Walk of Fame, located in Marshfield, Missouri, in 2007. Nine years later on August 30, 2016, she was presented with the Order of the Long Leaf Pine, the highest civilian honor bestowed in North Carolina, by the state's lieutenant governor, Dan Forest, having been granted it by Governor Pat McCrory.

== Partial filmography ==
Film
Year	Title	Role	Notes
1948	Apartment for Peggy	Wife	Credited as Betty Ann Lynn
1948	Sitting Pretty	Ginger	Credited as Betty Ann Lynn
1948	June Bride	Barbara Brinker	
1949	Mother Is a Freshman	Susan Abbott	
1949	Father Was a Fullback	Constance "Connie" Cooper	
1950	Cheaper by the Dozen	Deborah Lancaster	
1951	Payment on Demand	Martha Ramsey	
1951	Take Care of My Little Girl	Marge Colby	
1956	Meet Me in Las Vegas	Young Bride	Alternative title: Viva Las Vegas!
1956	Behind the High Wall	Anne MacGregor	
1957	Gun for a Coward	Claire	
1959	Louisiana Hussy	Lili Guillot	
1959	The Hangman	Hotel Cafe Waitress	

Television
Year	Title	Role	Episode(s)
1958	M Squad	Susan Baines	"The Trap"
1958	Lawman	Edna Phillips	"The Oath"
1958	Wagon Train	Molly Richardson	"The Dick Richardson Story"
1958	Bronco	Molly Bailey	"Baron of Broken Lace"
1959	Tales of Wells Fargo	Marcy Francis	"The Bounty Hunter"
1959	Mickey Spillane's Mike Hammer	Mona	"Pen Pals"
1959	Sugarfoot	Sarah Sears	"The Royal Raiders"
1959	Sugarfoot	Alice Fenton	"The Twister"
1960–1961	Texas John Slaughter	Viola	Eight episodes (from mid-season 2 and all of 3)
1960–1966	The Andy Griffith Show	Thelma Lou	Twenty-six episodes
1960	National Velvet	Barbara Howard	"Mi's Girl"
1963	The Farmer's Daughter	Sylvia	"The Speechmaker: Part 2"
1965	The Smothers Brothers Show	Vera	"Here Comes the Bridegroom"
1967–1970	My Three Sons	Janet/Janice; Lois	Seven episodes
1966–1968	Family Affair	Miss Lee	Four episodes
1969	The Mod Squad	Mrs. Hill	"The Healer"
1974	Little House on the Prairie	Bridget	"If I Should Wake Before I Die"
1978	Barnaby Jones	Mrs. Russell	"Blind Jeopardy"
1986	Matlock	Sarah	Four episodes
