= Aneta Corsaut =

American actress (1933–1995)

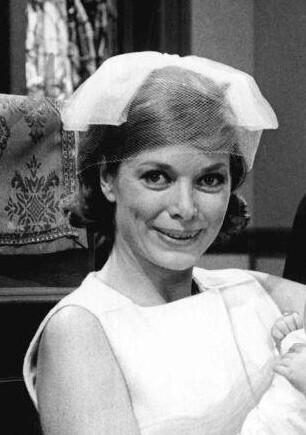
- Corsaut in Mayberry RFD (1969)
- Born: Aneta Louise Corsaut; November 3, 1933; Hutchinson, Kansas, U.S.
- Died: November 6, 1995 (aged 62); Studio City, Los Angeles, California, U.S.
- Resting place: Valhalla Memorial Park Cemetery
- Other names: Anita Corsault; Aneta Corseaut
- Occupation: Actress
- Years active: 1955–1992

Aneta Louise Corsaut (November 3, 1933 – November 6, 1995) was an American actress and writer. She is best known for playing Helen Crump on The Andy Griffith Show (1963–1968), Judge Cynthia Justin on Matlock (1991–1992), and Jane in The Blob (1958).

== Early life ==
Born in Hutchinson, Kansas, Corsaut was the daughter of Jesse Harrison and Opal J. (née Swarens) Corsaut. She majored in drama at Northwestern University and studied acting with Lee Strasberg. During her junior year, Corsaut dropped out to pursue a career in acting, although during the run of The Andy Griffith Show, Corsaut took courses at UCLA with plans to earn her degree.

== Career ==
She began acting in New York City in the mid-1950s. In 1958, Corsaut and Steve McQueen made their film debuts in the independent cult horror film The Blob. On television, in 1961–1962, she portrayed Irma Howell on the CBS sitcom Mrs. G. Goes to College.

Corsaut first appeared on the long-running The Andy Griffith Show, in "Andy Discovers America" as schoolteacher Helen Crump, who later became the Mayberry sheriff's wife on the first episode of the spinoff Mayberry R.F.D. In 1965, she was also cast as Kathy McLennan, the young widow of a rancher, in the episode "Paid in Full" on the syndicated Western anthology series Death Valley Days. Corsaut later had a continuing role as policeman Bumper Morgan's pawn-shop-owner friend on the 1975–1976 series The Blue Knight. In the series Adam-12, Corsaut portrayed Officer Pete Malloy's girlfriend Judy. She had a supporting role as Head Nurse Bradley in the 1980s sitcom House Calls, and she appeared in several episodes of Matlock with star Andy Griffith. In addition, Corsaut played the role of nurse Jessie Brewer in 1977 on the long-running ABC soap opera General Hospital when long-time portrayer Emily McLaughlin was too ill to work.

She returned to the role of Helen Crump in the reunion shows Return to Mayberry in 1986 and The Andy Griffith Show Reunion in 1993.

As a writer, she coauthored The Mystery Reader's Quiz Book.

== Personal life ==
Corsaut neither married nor had children.

According to the 2015 book Andy & Don: The Making of a Friendship and a Classic American TV Show, Corsaut and the married Andy Griffith were in a relationship throughout their five years together on The Andy Griffith Show. The affair was an open secret among the cast and crew.

== Death ==
On November 6, 1995, Corsaut died of cancer in Los Angeles, California, three days after her 62nd birthday. She was interred at Valhalla Memorial Park Cemetery in nearby North Hollywood.

== Filmography ==
=== Film ===
Year	Title	Role	Notes
1958	The Blob	Jane Martin	Credited as Aneta Corseaut
1964	Good Neighbor Sam	Fran	Uncredited
1965	A Rage to Live	Mary	Uncredited
1974	Blazing Saddles	Tourist Mother	Uncredited
1978	The Toolbox Murders	Joanne Ballard	

=== Television ===
Year	Title	Role	Notes
1955	Producers' Showcase		"The Fourposter"
1955	Robert Montgomery Presents		"Man Lost"
1959	Black Saddle	Mary Warren	"Client: Peter Warren"
1960	Unsolved	Gloria	TV movie
1960	Johnny Ringo	Lettie Frome	"Black Harvest"
1960	Dick Powell's Zane Grey Theatre	Amy	"Ransom"
1960	Guestward, Ho!	Mrs. Bennet	"Bab's Mother"
1960	The Detectives	Ruth Shaley	"Longshot"
1960	Death Valley Days	Lydia Starkweather	"Cap'n Pegleg"
1960	The Law and Mr. Jones	Berger's Daughter	"No Sale"
1961	The Law and Mr. Jones	Mary Clover	"One for the Money"
1961	Hennesey	Mrs. Vaughn	"The Specialist"
1961	Hong Kong	Jeannie	"Lady Godiva"
1961	Harrigan and Son	Susan Fenton	"The Man Who Wouldn't Stay Dead"
1961–1962	Mrs. G. Goes to College	Irma Howell	Regular role
1962	The Detectives	Mae Banks	"The Fourth Commandment"
1962	Death Valley Days	Emilie Reed	"Suzie"
1962	Saints and Sinners	Ellie	"A Shame for the Diamond Wedding"
1963	Bonanza	Rebecca Kaufman	"The Way of Aaron"
1963	The Real McCoys	Karen	"The McCoy Hex"
1963–1968	The Andy Griffith Show	Helen Crump	Recurring role
1964	The Eleventh Hour	Marian	"The Secret in the Stone"
1965	Ben Casey	Hanna Berger	"Where Does the Boomerang Go?"
1965	Death Valley Days	Kathy McLennan / Sarah Howard / Emma Donaldson	"Paid in Full", "Dry Water Sailors", "The Red Shawl"
1965	The Farmer's Daughter	Alice	"Katy by Moonlight"
1965	Valentine's Day	Lydia Newman	"I'll Cry at My Wedding"
1965	Gunsmoke	Eleanor Starkey	"Twenty Miles from Dodge"
1967	Gunsmoke	Sister Ruth	"Ladies from St. Louis"
1968–1969	Mayberry R.F.D.	Helen Crump Taylor	"Andy and Helen Get Married", "Andy's Baby"
1970	Me and Benjie		TV movie
1970	Nanny and the Professor	Dr. Neilson	"My Son, the Sitter"
1973	Marcus Welby, M.D.	Jenny Bailey	"Gemini Descending"
1973	Owen Marshall: Counselor at Law	Ethel Palmer	"Why Is a Crooked Letter"
1973	Columbo	Nurse Morgan	"A Stitch in Crime"
1974	Bad Ronald	Mrs. Matthews	TV movie
1974	Emergency!	Helena Hartley	"Propinquity", "Surprise", "Inventions"
1975	Emergency!	Sheila	"Simple Adjustment"
1975	McMillan & Wife	Hotel Desk Clerk	"Love, Honor and Swindle"
1975	Adam-12	Judy	"Ladies' Night", "Something Worth Dying For: Part 2"
1975	The Blue Knight	Vera	"Triple Threat"
1976	Rich Man, Poor Man	Miss Erdlatz	"Part I: Chapters 1 & 2"
1976	Marcus Welby, M.D.	Brenda Tillerman	"The Highest Mountain"
1979	The Runaways	Shirley Grady	"Street of Terror: Part 2"
1980–81	House Calls	Head Nurse Bradley	Recurring role
1983	Hart to Hart	Dorothy Smith	"Pandora Has Wings"
1984	Days of Our Lives	Blanche Dailey	TV series
1986	Hotel	Mrs. Weaver	"Hearts Divided"
1986	Return to Mayberry	Helen Crump Taylor	TV movie
1987	Matlock	Mrs. Ida Stillman	"The Network"
1990	Matlock	Sarah Richards	"The Mother"
1991–1992	Matlock	Judge Cynthia Justin	Recurring role, (final appearance)
