= Frances Bavier =

American actress (1902–1989)

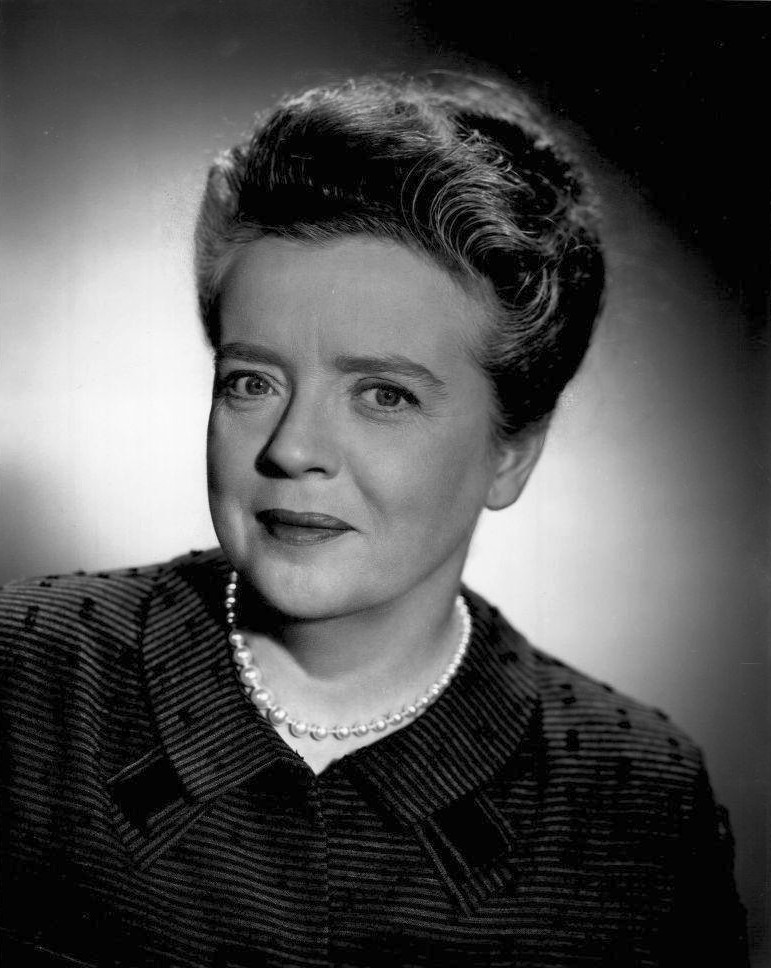
- Bavier in 1964
- Born: Frances Elizabeth Bavier; December 14, 1902; New York City, New York, U.S.
- Died: December 6, 1989 (aged 86); Siler City, North Carolina, U.S.
- Resting place: Oakwood Cemetery, Siler City, North Carolina, U.S.
- Education: Columbia University; American Academy of Dramatic Arts
- Occupation: Actress
- Years active: 1927–1974
- Known for: The Andy Griffith Show; Mayberry R.F.D. It's a Great Life
- Spouse: Russell Carpenter (m. 1928; div. 1933)

Frances Elizabeth Bavier (December 14, 1902 – December 6, 1989) was an American stage and television actress. Originally from New York theatre, she worked in film and television from the 1950s until the 1970s. She is widely known for her role as Aunt Bee on The Andy Griffith Show and Mayberry R.F.D. from 1960 to 1970. Aunt Bee logged more Mayberry years (ten) than any other character. She won an Emmy Award for Outstanding Supporting Comedy Actress for the role in 1967. Bavier was also known for playing Amy Morgan on It's a Great Life (1954–1956).

== Early life and career ==
Bavier was born in New York City in a brownstone on Gramercy Park to Charles S. Bavier, a stationary engineer, and Mary S. (née Birmingham) Bavier. She originally planned to become a teacher after attending Columbia University. She first appeared in vaudeville, later moving to the Broadway stage.

After graduating from the American Academy of Dramatic Arts in 1925, she was cast in the stage comedy The Poor Nut. Bavier's big break came in the original Broadway production of On Borrowed Time. She later appeared with Henry Fonda in the play Point of No Return.

During World War II Bavier toured with an entertainment group, performing for military troops in the European and South Pacific theaters for two years. Those efforts were recognized in 1955 after an ex-Marine in Chicago began collecting autographs from other former servicemen to show their appreciation for Bavier. He presented her with a scroll that contained 10,000 signatures. The scroll said, in part, "For thousands of us, you became a symbol of our own mothers."

Bavier had roles in more than a dozen films, and played a range of supporting roles on television. Career highlights include her turn as Mrs. Barley in the classic 1951 film The Day the Earth Stood Still. In 1955, she played the rough and tough "Aunt Maggie" Sawtelle, a frontier Ma Barker–type character, in the Lone Ranger episode "Sawtelle's Saga End". In 1957, she played Nora Martin, mother of Eve Arden's character on The Eve Arden Show, despite the fact that Arden was less than six years younger than Bavier. That same year, Bavier guest-starred in the eighth episode of Perry Mason as Louise Marlow in "The Case of the Crimson Kiss".

She was in an episode of The Danny Thomas Show, which featured Andy Griffith as Andy Taylor and Ron Howard as Opie Taylor. She played a character named Henrietta Perkins. The episode led to The Andy Griffith Show, and Bavier was cast in the role of Aunt Bee. Bavier had a love-hate relationship with her famous role during the run of the show. As a New York City actress, she felt her dramatic talents were being overlooked, yet after playing Bee for eight seasons, she was the only original cast member to remain with the series in the spin-off, Mayberry R.F.D., for two additional seasons.

Bavier was easily offended on the set of The Andy Griffith Show and the production staff took a cautious approach when communicating with her. Series star Andy Griffith once admitted the two sometimes clashed during the series’ run. On an appearance on Larry King Live (November 27, 2003), Griffith said Bavier phoned him four months before she died and apologized for being "difficult" during the series’ run. Bavier confessed in an interview with Bill Ballard for Carolina Camera that "it is very difficult for an actress ... to create a role and to be so identified that you as a person no longer exist and all the recognition you get is for a part that is created on the screen."

Bavier won the Primetime Emmy Award for Outstanding Performance by an Actress in a Supporting Role in a Comedy in 1967.

== Later years ==
In 1974, Bavier retired from acting and bought a home in Siler City, North Carolina. On choosing to live in North Carolina instead of her native New York, Bavier said, "I fell in love with North Carolina, all the pretty roads and the trees." Bavier was said to have married Russell Carpenter briefly in her early career, but there is no proof that this actually occurred. According to a 1981 article by Chip Womick, a staff writer of The Courier Tribune, Bavier enthusiastically promoted Christmas and Easter Seal Societies from her Siler City home, and often wrote inspirational letters to fans who sought autographs. Additionally she left a $100,000 trust fund for the police force in Siler City, the interest from which is divided among the approximately 20 employees as a bonus every December.

== Death ==
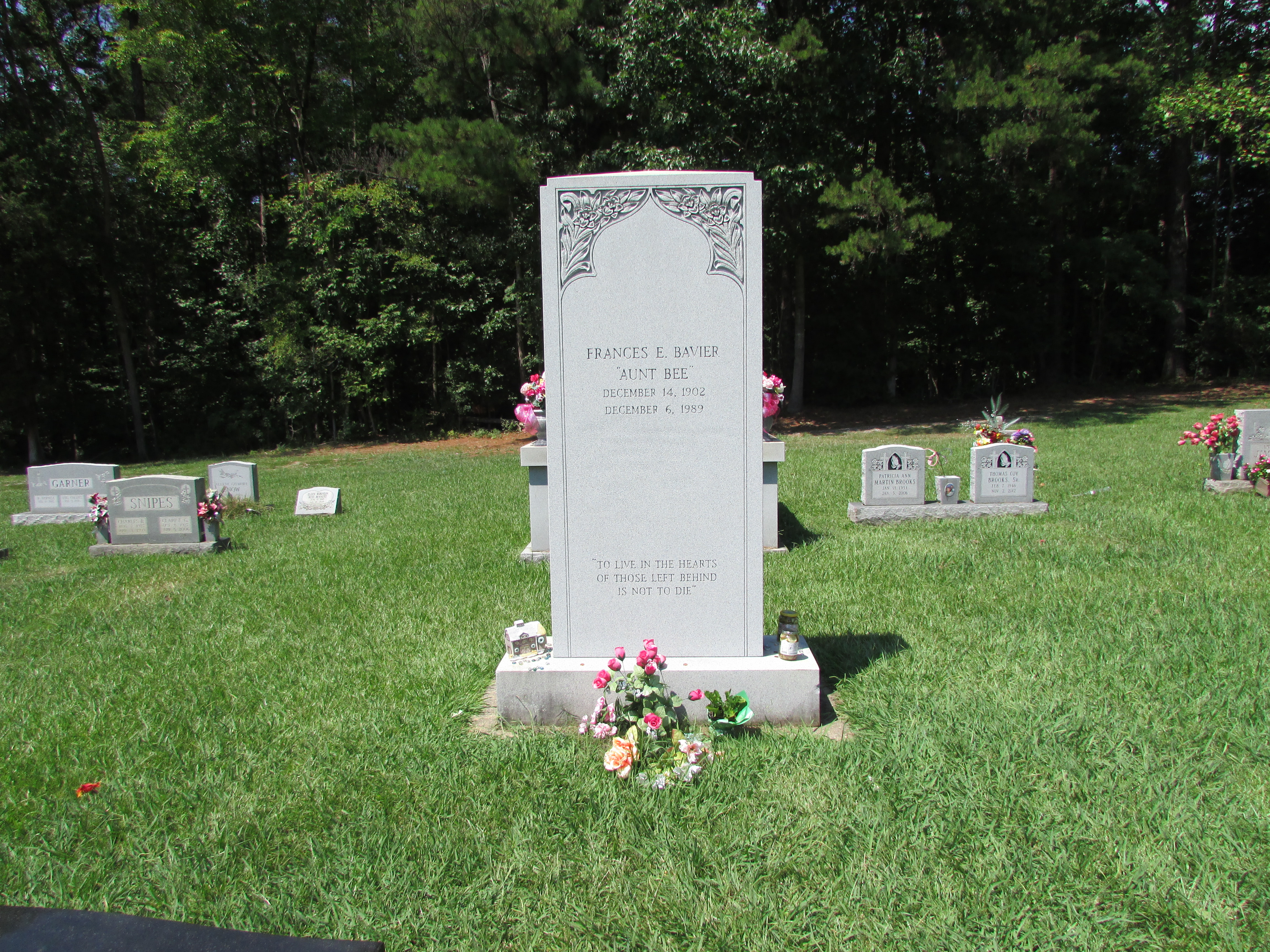
Bavier's gravestone in 2017

Bavier was described "as living a sparse life in her later years, a very quiet life". On November 22, 1989, she was admitted to Chatham Hospital, where she was kept in the coronary care unit for two weeks. She was discharged on December 4, 1989. Bavier died at 7 p.m. on December 6, 1989, two days after being released from the hospital. The immediate causes of death were listed as congestive heart failure, myocardial infarction, coronary artery disease, and atherosclerosis, with supporting factors being breast cancer, arthritis, and chronic obstructive pulmonary disease (COPD). Bavier is interred at Oakwood Cemetery in Siler City. Her headstone includes the name of her most famous role, "Aunt Bee", and reads, "To live in the hearts of those left behind is not to die."

== Filmography ==
Year	Title:	Role:	Notes
1931	Girls About Town	Joy	Uncredited
1943	O, My Darling Clementine	Mrs. Asbury	
1951	The Day the Earth Stood Still	Mrs. Barley	
1951	The Stooge	Mrs. Rogers	
1952	The Lady Says No	Aunt Alice Hatch	
1952	Bend of the River	Mrs. Prentiss	Alternative title: Where the River Bends
1952	Sally and Saint Anne	Mrs. Kitty "Mom" O'Moyne	
1952	My Wife's Best Friend	Mrs. Chamberlain	
1952	Horizons West	Martha Hammond	
1953	Man in the Attic	Helen Harley	
1956	The Bad Seed	Woman in dinner party scene	Uncredited
1958	A Nice Little Bank That Should Be Robbed	Mrs. Solitaire	Alternative title: How to Rob a Bank
1959	It Started with a Kiss	Mrs. Tappe	
1974	Benji	Lady with cat	(final film role)

== Television credits ==
Year	Title	Role	Notes
1952	Racket Squad	Martha Carver	1 episode
1952– 1953	Gruen Guild Playhouse	Sarah Cummings	2 episodes
1953	Hallmark Hall of Fame	Lou Bloor	1 episode
1953– 1954	City Detective	Various roles	3 episodes
1953– 1954	Letter to Loretta	Various roles	3 episodes
1953– 1955	Dragnet	Hazel Howard	3 episodes
1954	The Pepsi-Cola Playhouse	Thelma	2 episodes
1954– 1955	Waterfront	Martha; Amy	2 episodes
1954– 1956	It's a Great Life	Mrs. Amy Morgan	62 episodes
1955	The Lone Ranger	Aunt Maggie Sawtelle	Season 4 Episode 29: "Sawtelle Saga's End"
1955	Soldiers of Fortune	Amelia Lilly	1 episode
1955	Damon Runyon Theater		1 episode
1955	Alfred Hitchcock Presents	Mrs. Fergusen	Season 1 Episode 1: Revenge
1956	Lux Video Theatre		1 episode
1956	Cavalcade of America	Mrs. Hayes	1 episode
1957	Jane Wyman Presents The Fireside Theatre		1 episode
1957	General Electric Theater	Miss Trimingham	1 episode
1957	Perry Mason	Louise Marlow	1 episode
1957– 1958	The Eve Arden Show	Mrs. Nora Martin	5 episodes
1958	Colgate Theatre		Season 1 Episode 8: "If You Knew Tomorrow"
1959	The Ann Sothern Show	Mrs. Wallace	1 episode
1959	The Thin Man		1 episode
1959	Sugarfoot	Aunt Nancy Thomas	1 episode
1959	Wagon Train	Sister Joseph	1 episode - "The Sister Rita Story"
1959	77 Sunset Strip	Grandma Fenwick	1 episode
1960	The Danny Thomas Show	Henrietta Perkins	1 episode
1960	Rawhide	Ellen Ferguson	1 episode
1960– 1968	The Andy Griffith Show	Aunt Beatrice "Bee" Taylor	175 episodes Primetime Emmy Award for Outstanding Supporting Actress – Comedy Series (1967)
1967	Gomer Pyle, U.S.M.C.	Aunt Bee Taylor	1 episode
1968– 1970	Mayberry R.F.D.	Aunt Bee Taylor	24 episodes
