= The Andy Griffith Show =

American sitcom TV series (1960–1968)

- Genre: Sitcom
- Created by: Sheldon Leonard
- Starring: Andy Griffith; Ronny Howard; Don Knotts; Frances Bavier
- Theme music composer: Earle Hagen; Herbert W. Spencer (Note: Although Hagen was the sole composer of the theme, the BMI credits Spencer as "co-composer".)
- Opening theme: "The Andy Griffith Show Theme"
- Country of origin: United States
- Original language: English
- No. of seasons: 8
- No. of episodes: 249 (list of episodes)

Production
- Executive producers: Sheldon Leonard; Danny Thomas
- Production locations: Desilu Culver (1960–1967); Paramount Studios (1967–1968)
- Camera setup: Single-camera
- Running time: 25–26 minutes
- Production companies: Danny Thomas Enterprises; Mayberry Enterprises; CBS Productions

Original release
- Network: CBS
- Release: October 3, 1960 – April 1, 1968

Related
- The Danny Thomas Show; Gomer Pyle, U.S.M.C.; Mayberry R.F.D.

The Andy Griffith Show is an American sitcom television series that aired on CBS from October 3, 1960, to April 1, 1968, with a total of 249 half-hour episodes spanning eight seasons—159 in black and white and 90 in color.

The series originated from an episode of The Danny Thomas Show. It stars Andy Griffith as Andy Taylor, the widowed sheriff of Mayberry, North Carolina, a fictional community of roughly 2,000–5,000 people. Other major characters include Andy's lifelong friend (and cousin), the well-meaning and enthusiastic but bumbling deputy, Barney Fife (Don Knotts), Andy's aunt and housekeeper, Bee Taylor (Frances Bavier) and Andy's young son, Opie (Ron Howard). The townspeople round out the regular cast. Regarding the tone of the show, Griffith said that despite a contemporary setting, the show evoked nostalgia, saying in a Today interview, "Well, though we never said it, and though it was shot in the '60s, it had a feeling of the '30s. It was when we were doing it, of a time gone by."

The series was never placed lower than seventh in the Nielsen ratings, ending its final season at number one. The only other shows to end their runs at the top of the ratings are I Love Lucy (1957) and Seinfeld (1998). On separate occasions, it has been ranked by TV Guide as the 9th- and 13th-best series in American television history. Though neither Griffith nor the show won awards during its eight-season run, co-stars Knotts and Bavier accumulated a combined total of six Emmy Awards. The series spawned its own spin-off – Gomer Pyle, U.S.M.C. (1964–1969) – and a reunion telemovie, Return to Mayberry (1986).

After the eighth season, when Griffith left the series, it was retitled Mayberry, R.F.D., with Ken Berry and Buddy Foster replacing Griffith and Howard in new roles. In the new format, it ran for 78 episodes, ending in 1971 after three seasons. Reruns of The Andy Griffith Show are often shown on TV Land, MeTV, The CW, and SundanceTV. On those channels, the episodes are edited to make room for more commercials; however, SundanceTV sometimes air the full uncut versions. The complete series is available on DVD and Blu-ray and intermittently on streaming video services such as Amazon Prime and Paramount+. Mayberry Days, an annual festival celebrating the sitcom, is held each year in Griffith's hometown, Mount Airy, North Carolina.

== Origin ==
Sheldon Leonard—producer of The Danny Thomas Show—and Danny Thomas hired veteran comedy writer Arthur Stander (who had written many of the "Danny Thomas" episodes) to create a pilot show for Griffith, featuring him as justice of the peace and newspaper editor in a small town. At the time, Broadway, film, and radio star Griffith was interested in attempting a television role, and the William Morris Agency told Leonard that Griffith's rural background and previous rustic characterizations were suited to the part. After conferences between Leonard and Griffith in New York City, Griffith flew to Los Angeles and filmed the episode. On February 15, 1960, The Danny Thomas Show episode "Danny Meets Andy Griffith" aired. In the episode, Griffith played the fictional Sheriff Andy Taylor of Mayberry, North Carolina, who arrests Danny Williams (Thomas' character) for running a stop sign. Future players in The Andy Griffith Show, Bavier and Howard, appeared in the episode as townspeople Henrietta Perkins and Opie Taylor (the sheriff's son), respectively. General Foods, sponsor of The Danny Thomas Show, had first access to the spin-off and committed to it immediately. On October 3, 1960, at 9:30 p.m., The Andy Griffith Show made its debut.

== Production ==
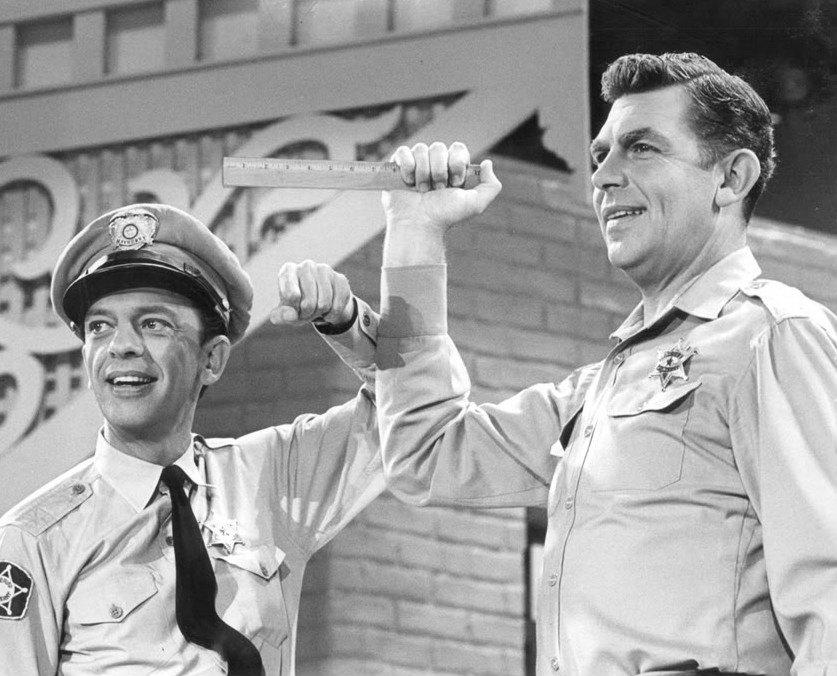
Knotts and Griffith as their characters in a still taken from the October 7, 1965, one-hour variety special The Andy Griffith, Don Knotts, and Jim Nabors Show

The sitcom's production team included producers Aaron Ruben (1960–1965) and Bob Ross (1965–1968). First-season writers (many of whom worked in pairs) included Jack Elinson, Charles Stewart, Arthur Stander, and Frank Tarloff (as "David Adler"), Benedict Freedman and John Fenton Murray, Leo Solomon and Ben Gershman, and Jim Fritzell and Everett Greenbaum. During season six, Greenbaum and Fritzell left the show. Ruben departed for Gomer Pyle, U.S.M.C., a show he owned in part. Writer Harvey Bullock left after season six. Bob Sweeney directed the first three seasons save the premiere. The show was filmed at Desilu Studios, with exteriors filmed at Forty Acres in Culver City, California. Woodsy locales were filmed north of Beverly Hills at Franklin Canyon, including the opening credits and closing credits with Andy and Opie walking to and from "the fishin' hole". Don Knotts, who knew Griffith professionally (they had appeared together in both the Broadway and film versions of No Time for Sergeants) and had seen The Danny Thomas Show episode, called Griffith during the developmental stages of the show and suggested the Sheriff character needed a deputy and comic sideman; Griffith agreed. Knotts auditioned for the show's creator and executive producer, Sheldon Leonard, and was offered a five-year contract playing Barney Fife. The show's theme music was composed by Earle Hagen, who also performed the whistling in the opening and closing credits. Herbert Spencer was credited by the BMI as "co-composer", but was not involved with the composition of the theme. In 1961, actor Everett Sloane, who also guest starred as Jubal Foster in the episode "The Keeper of the Flame", wrote lyrics for the theme after he learned it did not have any. This vocal version of the theme was renamed "The Fishin' Hole" and first appeared on an LP album of music from the show. One of the show's tunes, "The Mayberry March", was reworked several times in different tempo, styles, and orchestrations as background music. The show's sole sponsor was General Foods, with promotional consideration paid for (in the form of cars) by Ford Motor Company (mentioned in the credits).

=== Griffith's development of Andy Taylor ===
Initially, Griffith played Taylor as a heavy-handed unworldly country bumpkin, grinning from ear to ear and speaking in a hesitant, frantic but friendly manner. The style recalled that used in the delivery of his popular monologues such as "What It Was, Was Football." He gradually abandoned the "rustic Taylor" and developed a serious and thoughtful characterization. Producer Aaron Ruben recalled:

He was being that marvelously funny character from No Time for Sergeants, Will Stockdale [a role Griffith played on stage and in film] ... One day he said, "My God, I just realized that I'm the straight man. I'm playing straight to all these kooks around me." He didn't like himself [in first year reruns] ... and in the next season he changed, becoming this Lincolnesque character.

As Griffith stopped portraying some of the sheriff's more unsophisticated character traits and mannerisms, creating his own problems and troubles was impossible in the manner of other central sitcom characters such as Lucy in I Love Lucy or Archie Bunker in All in the Family, whose problems were the result of their temperaments, philosophies, and attitudes. Consequently, the characters around Taylor were employed to create the problems and troubles, with rock-solid Taylor stepping in as problem solver, mediator, advisor, disciplinarian, and counselor.

== Premise and characters ==
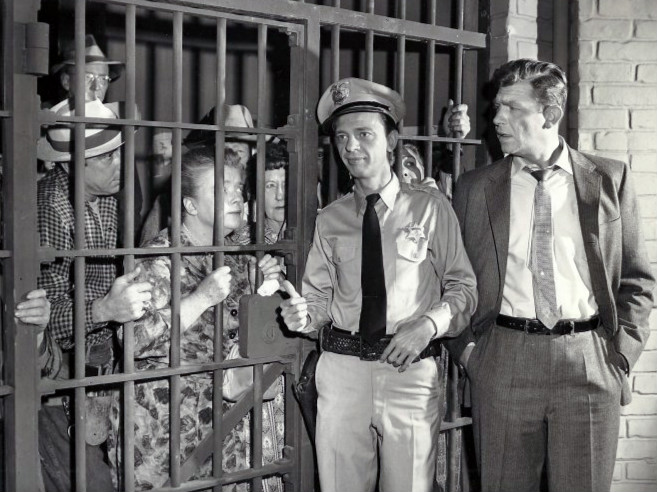
In the 1961 episode "Andy Saves Barney's Morale", Andy leaves Barney in charge while he is away and returns to find Barney has jailed many of Mayberry's citizens for petty reasons.

The series revolves around Andy Taylor (Andy Griffith), the sheriff of the sleepy, slow-paced, fictional community of Mayberry, North Carolina. His laid-back but level-headed approach to law enforcement makes him the scourge of local moonshiners and out-of-town criminals, while his abilities to settle community problems with commonsense advice, mediation, and conciliation make him popular with his fellow citizens. His professional life, however, is complicated by the repeated gaffes of his inept deputy, Barney Fife (Don Knotts). Barney is Andy's cousin and best friend. At home, widower Andy raises his young son Opie (Ronny Howard), assisted by his maiden aunt and housekeeper, Aunt Bee (Frances Bavier). Opie, though generally respectful and well-behaved, is also curious and adventuresome and tests his father's parenting skills. Aunt Bee, meanwhile, is a wonderful cook and housekeeper, but her ill-considered romances and occasional quirks cause her nephew concern.

Andy's friends and neighbors include, at various times, barber Floyd Lawson (Howard McNear; Walter Baldwin portrayed the role in the 1960 episode "Stranger in Town"), service station attendants and cousins Gomer Pyle (Jim Nabors) and Goober Pyle (George Lindsey), and local drunkard Otis Campbell (Hal Smith). There are two mayors over the course of the series: Mayor Pike (Dick Elliott) is more relaxed, but often indecisive, while Mayor Roy Stoner (Parley Baer) has a more assertive personality. Other semi-regulars include townswoman Clara Edwards (Hope Summers), Barney's sweetheart Thelma Lou (Betty Lynn) and Andy's schoolteacher sweetheart Helen Crump (Aneta Corsaut). Ellie Walker (Elinor Donahue) is Andy's girlfriend in the first season, while Peggy McMillan (Joanna Moore) is a nurse who becomes his girlfriend in season 3. In the color seasons, County Clerk Howard Sprague (Jack Dodson) and handyman Emmett Clark (Paul Hartman) appear regularly, while Barney's replacement, Deputy Warren Ferguson (Jack Burns), appears in about half of season six.

Ernest T. Bass made his first appearance in episode 94 ("Mountain Wedding"), as well as four later episodes. The actor who portrayed him, Howard Morris, also played George, the television repairman in episode 140 ("Andy and Helen Have Their Day") and two uncredited voice roles, as Leonard Blush and a radio announcer. Morris also directed a total of eight episodes of the show, none while portraying Ernest T. Bass.

Unseen characters such as telephone operator Sarah, and Barney's love interest, local diner waitress Juanita Beasley, as mentioned in the first season, are often referenced. The show's announcer for the first five seasons, Colin Male, portrayed Game Warden Peterson in episode 140 ("Andy and Helen Have Their Day").

In the series' last few episodes, farmer Sam Jones (Ken Berry) debuts and later becomes the lead of the retitled show, Mayberry R.F.D. Don Knotts, Aneta Corsaut, Jack Dodson, and Betty Lynn also appeared on Griffith's later show, Matlock.

== Episodes ==
Season	Episodes	Originally released		Rank	Rating	Viewers (millions)
Season	Episodes	First released	Last released	Rank	Rating	Viewers (millions)
Intro	1	February 15, 1960		—N/a	—N/a	—N/a
1	32	October 3, 1960	May 22, 1961	4	27.8	13.12
2	31	October 2, 1961	May 7, 1962	7	27.0	13.10
3	32	October 1, 1962	May 6, 1963	6	29.7	14.93
4	32	September 30, 1963	May 18, 1964	5	29.4	15.17
5	32	September 21, 1964	May 3, 1965	4	28.3	14.91
6	30	September 13, 1965	April 11, 1966	6	26.9	14.48
7	30	September 12, 1966	April 10, 1967	3	27.4	15.10
8	30	September 11, 1967	April 1, 1968	1	27.6	15.64

The show comprises eight full seasons and 249 episodes—159 episodes in black and white (seasons 1–5) and 90 in color (seasons 6–8). Griffith appears in all 249 episodes with Howard appearing in 202, Bavier appearing in 175, and Knotts appearing in 141. Only Griffith, Howard, Bavier, Knotts and Hope Summers appeared in all eight seasons. Knotts left the show at the end of season five to pursue a career in films (on the show, it is explained that he takes a job as a detective with the Raleigh Police Department) but returned to make five guest appearances as Barney in seasons six through eight. His last appearance is in the final season, in a story about a summit meeting with Soviet dignitaries "ranked eleventh among single comedy programs most watched in television between 1960 and 1984, with an audience of thirty-three and a half million."

== Reruns, spin-offs and reunions ==
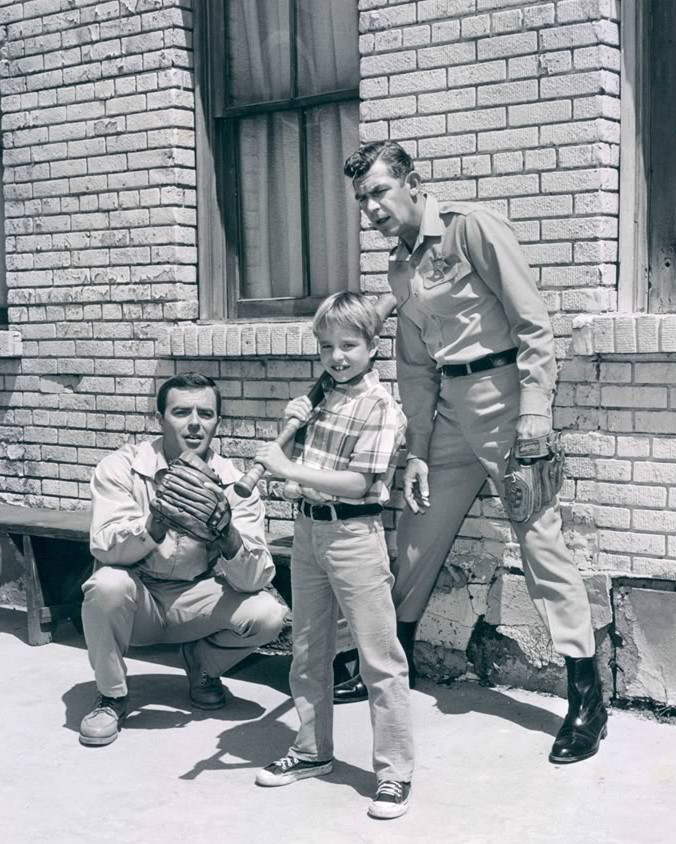
Sam Jones (Ken Berry) and his son Mike (Buddy Foster) were recurring characters in the final season of The Andy Griffith Show, setting up the sequel series Mayberry R.F.D.

In October 1964, CBS added reruns of the show to its daytime schedule. Titled Andy of Mayberry to distinguish the repeat episodes from the new episodes airing in primetime, these aired in daytime until September 1970. The show entered syndication a year later under its original title.

At the end of season four (May 1964), the backdoor pilot "Gomer Pyle, U.S.M.C." aired and the following September, the spinoff series Gomer Pyle, U.S.M.C. debuted with Jim Nabors in the role of Gomer and Frank Sutton as drill instructor Sergeant Vince Carter.

In the last episodes of the eighth season, as Griffith was preparing to leave, the character Sam Jones, played by Ken Berry, was introduced as the new star and the series was retitled Mayberry R.F.D. Most of the cast members continued their original roles, with Bavier becoming Sam's housekeeper. To create a smooth transition, Andy and Helen were married in the first episode with the new title and remained for a few additional episodes before leaving with a move to Raleigh, effectively ending their appearances.

After RFD's cancellation in 1971, George Lindsey played Goober for many years on the popular country-variety show Hee Haw.

Goober, Barney and Emmett all made appearances in the series premiere of The New Andy Griffith Show, which starred Griffith as a similar but canonically different character, Mayor Andy Sawyer. All three characters treated Sawyer as if he were Andy Taylor. The series only lasted ten episodes.

In 1986, the reunion telemovie Return to Mayberry was broadcast with several cast members reprising their original roles. Absent, however, was Frances Bavier. She was living in Siler City, North Carolina in ill health and declined to participate. In the TV movie, Aunt Bee is portrayed as deceased (and in fact, Bavier did die three years later), with Andy visiting her grave. Also absent were Howard McNear, Paul Hartman, Jack Burns, and the cast members who were featured only in the Mayberry RFD seasons.

In 1993, The Andy Griffith Show had a Reunion Special which featured Andy Griffith, Don Knotts, Ron Howard, Jim Nabors, George Lindsey, and Jack Dodson.

In 2003, four surviving cast members (Griffith, Howard, Knotts, and Nabors) came together for a reunion special that featured the actors reminiscing about each other's time on the show. The production was interspersed with archival footage and short filmed interviews with some of the other surviving cast members. This special was called The Andy Griffith Show: Back to Mayberry.

Griffith and Howard reprised their roles a final time for a Funny or Die skit supporting the 2008 presidential campaign of Barack Obama.

== Reception ==
=== Ratings ===
The Andy Griffith Show was a top ten hit through its entire run, never ranking lower than seventh place in the yearly ratings. A Nielsen study conducted during the show's final season (1967–68) indicated the show ranked number one among blue collar workers followed by The Lucy Show and Gunsmoke. Among white collar workers, the show ranked third, following Saturday Movies and The Dean Martin Show. The final season of The Andy Griffith Show was the number one ranked show on television. Other shows to have accomplished this include I Love Lucy and Seinfeld. In 1998, the year Seinfeld ended, more than five million people a day watched the show's reruns on 120 stations.

=== Awards and nominations ===
==== Emmys ====
1961

- Outstanding Performance in a Supporting Role by an Actor or Actress in a Series: Don Knotts – Won
- Outstanding Program Achievement in the Field of Humor – Nominated (Winner: The Jack Benny Program)

1962

- Outstanding Performance in a Supporting Role by an Actor: Don Knotts – Won
- Outstanding Program Achievement in the Field of Humor – Nominated (Winner: The Bob Newhart Show)

1963

- Outstanding Performance in a Supporting Role by an Actor: Don Knotts – Won

1966

- Outstanding Performance by an Actor in a Supporting Role in a Comedy: Don Knotts for "The Return of Barney Fife" – Won

1967

- Outstanding Comedy Series – Nominated (Winner: The Monkees)
- Outstanding Performance by an Actor in a Supporting Role in a Comedy: Don Knotts for "Barney Comes to Mayberry" – Won
- Outstanding Performance by an Actress in a Supporting Role in a Comedy: Frances Bavier – Won

==== TV Land Awards ====
- Favorite Second Banana: Don Knotts – Won (2003)
- Single Dad of the Year: Andy Griffith – Won (2003)
- Legend Award – Won (2004)

==== Other accolades ====
- In 1997, the episode "Opie the Birdman" was ranked No. 24 on TV Guide's 100 Greatest Episodes of All Time.
- In 2002, TV Guide ranked The Andy Griffith Show ninth on its list of the 50 Best Shows of All Time.
- Bravo ranked Andy Taylor 63rd on their list of the 100 greatest TV characters.
- In 2013, TV Guide ranked The Andy Griffith Show number 15 on their list of the 60 Greatest Shows of All Time.

== Merchandise and pop culture ==
Very little merchandise was produced for The Andy Griffith Show during its original run, a peculiarity for a hit TV show in the 1960s. One theory for the lack of merchandise is that the show's producers, Griffith in particular, wanted to protect its image as a realistic and thoughtful offering and keep the public's focus on the show itself rather than its branding. Among the handful of merchandise released during the show's first run, Dell Comics published two The Andy Griffith Show comic books, one drawn by Henry Scarpelli, the other by Bill Fraccio. In 2004, copies in near-mint condition were priced in excess of $500 each. There was also a soundtrack album, two coloring books, and a 1966 Grape-Nuts cereal box with a photo of Griffith in character as Sheriff Andy Taylor beside a lemon pie recipe on the back. The show's enduring popularity has spawned considerable merchandise during the decades following its cancellation, including board games, bobblehead dolls, kitchenware, and books. In 2007, a line of canned foods inspired by the series was made available in grocery stores across America.

Griffith's hometown of Mount Airy, North Carolina, annually hosts a week-long "Mayberry Days" celebration featuring concerts, parades and appearances by the show's players.

In 2003, the country band Rascal Flatts released the song "Mayberry" and many of the lyrics pay tribute to the show. Canadian rapper and singer Drake references the show's theme song in his 2009 track "Best I Ever Had".

Nirvana wrote the song "Floyd the Barber" from the album Bleach, based on Floyd Lawson.

The cable television network TV Land erected bronze statues of Andy and Opie in Mount Airy and Raleigh, North Carolina (see: Pullen Park).

The Taylor Home Inn in Clear Lake, Wisconsin, is a bed-and-breakfast modeled after the Taylor Home. The Mayberry Cafe in Danville, Indiana, features Aunt Bee's Fried Chicken and a replica of Andy's Ford Galaxie police car.

In 2021, the original feature film Mayberry Man was produced by children of actors from The Andy Griffith Show featuring Mayberry tribute artists set in a fictitious modern-day Mayberry.

== Home media ==
In the late 1980s, Premier Promotions released various episodes on VHS. Most tapes had either two or four episodes. In the early to mid-1990s, United American Video (under license from the show's then-syndicator Viacom Enterprises) released VHS tapes of various episodes. They either had two or three episodes. These compilations were culled from episodes early in the show's run that had lapsed into the public domain; these episodes continue to be circulated on unofficial video releases.

Starting in 2004, Paramount Home Entertainment (under the CBS Home Entertainment label starting in 2006) released all eight seasons as single-season packages on Region 1 DVD. The Andy Griffith Show: The Complete Series was first released as a 40-disc boxed set in 2007. In addition to all 249 episodes of the series, its bonus features included the episode "Danny Meets Andy Griffith" from The Danny Thomas Show which served as the pilot, the episode "Opie Joins the Marines" from Gomer Pyle, U.S.M.C. which featured Ron Howard and the 95-minute, made-for-television comedy film Return to Mayberry. In 2016, The Andy Griffith Show: The Complete Series was repackaged and released again as a 39-disc set that featured all 249 episodes of the series but did not include the bonus feature disc. The last 16 episodes of the third season, which lapsed into the public domain after CBS neglected to file copyright renewals on the episodes in 1989, are available on discount DVDs. The 2007 lawsuit CBS Operations Inc v. Reel Funds International Inc. ruled that the episodes in question were derivative works based on the copyrighted episodes even though the episodes themselves were not under copyright and granted CBS indirect copyright over the public domain episodes; the ruling enjoined Reel Funds International, a public domain distributor, from selling DVDs with those episodes within the jurisdiction of the United States District Court for the Northern District of Texas.

DVD name	Ep#	Release date
The First Season	32	November 16, 2004
The Second Season	31	May 24, 2005
The Third Season	32	August 16, 2005
The Fourth Season	32	November 22, 2005
The Fifth Season	32	February 14, 2006
The Sixth Season	30	May 9, 2006
The Seventh Season	30	August 29, 2006
The Final Season	30	December 12, 2006
The Complete Series	249	May 29, 2007
The Complete Series	249	February 16, 2016

Note: The Region 1 release of The Third Season contains two episodes edited for syndication: "The Darlings Are Coming"—which had several scenes cut—and "Barney Mends a Broken Heart", which had its epilogue cut.
