= Helen Crump =

Fictional character on the American television program The Andy Griffith Show

- Aneta Corsaut as Helen Crump
- First appearance: "Andy Discovers America"; The Andy Griffith Show; March 4, 1963
- Last appearance: Return to Mayberry; April 13, 1986
- Portrayed by: Aneta Corsaut

In-universe information
- Occupation: Schoolteacher, Author
- Spouse: Andy Taylor
- Children: Opie Taylor (stepson); Andrew Samuel Taylor, Jr. (son)
- Relatives: Edward (uncle); Cynthia (niece)

Helen Crump is a fictional dramatic character on the American television program The Andy Griffith Show (1960–1968). Helen was a schoolteacher and became main character Sheriff Andy Taylor's girlfriend, and eventually, wife. Helen first appears in the third-season episode "Andy Discovers America" (1963). She also appeared in spinoff program Mayberry R.F.D. (1968–1971), as well as the reunion telemovie, Return to Mayberry (1986). Helen was portrayed by Aneta Corsaut.

== Character biography ==
Helen Crump is from Kansas where she attended college in Kansas City majoring in journalism. Helen takes up residence in Mayberry where she is employed as an elementary schoolteacher.

Helen is first introduced in the third-season episode "Andy Discovers America". Opie and his classmates dislike their new teacher, referring to her as "old lady Crump". When Andy gives Opie advice about his own experience with school, Opie interprets this as not needing to do his history schoolwork. Helen confronts Andy at the courthouse and proceeds to tell him to stay out of her domain. Andy realizes what has happened and finds a way to get the boys excited about learning history. After a dramatic turnaround in the boys' approach to their history assignments, Helen is astonished to learn that Andy played a role in the sudden change. She thanks him and the two become friends. At the end of the episode, Andy shows his attraction to Helen by offering to walk her home.

Helen is actually a terrible cook, which initially causes Barney to think she is a poor match for Andy.

In one episode, Helen directs the high school senior play.

Her uncle, Edward, and her young niece, Cynthia, visit her in Mayberry.

=== Relationship with Andy Taylor ===
In the first episode of The Andy Griffith Show spinoff, Mayberry R.F.D., Andy and Helen marry. Other characters from The Andy Griffith Show make guest appearances in the episode.

The couple move to Raleigh, North Carolina, but return to Mayberry at a later date on Mayberry R.F.D. to christen their newborn son, Andrew Samuel Taylor.

In 1986, Andy and Helen appear in the reunion telemovie Return to Mayberry. The couple returns to Mayberry to see Opie and his wife become first-time parents.

== Appearances ==
The following is a list of episodes of The Andy Griffith Show and Mayberry R.F.D. featuring Helen.

=== The Andy Griffith Show ===
Season Three

- Episode 23: "Andy Discovers America"
- Episode 29: "A Wife for Andy"

Season Four

- Episode 8: "Opie's Ill-Gotten Gain"
- Episode 9: "A Date for Gomer"
- Episode 13: "Barney and the Cave Rescue"
- Episode 27: "Fun Girls"
- Episode 29: "The Rumor"

Season Five

- Episode 1: "Opie Loves Helen"
- Episode 4: "The Education of Ernest T. Bass"
- Episode 7: "Man in the Middle"
- Episode 13: "Andy and Helen Have Their Day"
- Episode 14: "Three Wishes for Opie"
- Episode 20: "Goober and the Art of Love
- Episode 21: "Barney Runs for Sheriff"
- Episode 24: "Guest in the House"
- Episode 27: "Aunt Bee's Invisible Beau"
- Episode 28: "The Arrest of the Fun Girls"
- Episode 30: "Opie Flunks Arithmetic"
- Episode 31: "Opie and the Carnival"

Season Six

- Episode 2: "Andy's Rival"
- Episode 4: "Aunt Bee, the Swinger"
- Episode 6: "A Warning from Warren"
- Episode 7: "Off to Hollywood"
- Episode 9: "The Hollywood Party"
- Episode 10: "Aunt Bee on TV"
- Episode 14: "The Church Organ"
- Episode 15: "Girl Shy"
- Episode 17: "The Return of Barney Fife"
- Episode 21: "Aunt Bee Learns to Drive"
- Episode 22: "Look Paw, I'm Dancing"
- Episode 23: "The Gypsies"
- Episode 24: "Eat Your Heart Out"
- Episode 25: "A Baby in the House"
- Episode 26: "The County Clerk"
- Episode 29: "The Battle of Mayberry"

Season Seven

- Episode 1: "Opie's Girlfriend"
- Episode 4: "The Ball Game"
- Episode 5: "Aunt Bee's Crowning Glory"
- Episode 6: "The Darling Fortune"
- Episode 9: "The Senior Play"
- Episode 10: "Opie Finds a Baby"
- Episode 14: "Goober Makes History"
- Episode 15: "A New Doctor in Town"
- Episode 16: "Don't Miss a Good Bet"
- Episode 17: "Dinner at Eight"
- Episode 19: "Barney Comes to Mayberry"
- Episode 20: "Andy's Old Girlfriend"
- Episode 21: "Aunt Bee's Restaurant"
- Episode 24: "Helen, the Authoress"
- Episode 29: "Opie's Most Unforgettable Character"

Season Eight

- Episode 1: "Opie's First Love"
- Episode 3: "A Trip to Mexico"
- Episode 4: "Andy's Trip to Raleigh"
- Episode 6: "Howard's Main Event"
- Episode 10: "Aunt Bee and the Lecturer"
- Episode 11: "Andy's Investment"
- Episode 12: "Howard and Millie"
- Episode 13: "Aunt Bee's Cousin"
- Episode 18: "Emmett's Brother-in-Law"
- Episode 20: "The Church Benefactors"
- Episode 23: "Aunt Bee's Big Moment"
- Episode 24: "Helen's Past"
- Episode 26: "The Wedding"
- Episode 27: "Sam for Town Council"
- Episode 29: "A Girl for Goober"
- Episode 30: "Mayberry R.F.D."

=== Mayberry R.F.D. ===
Season One

- Episode 1: "Andy and Helen Get Married"

Season Two

- Episode 2: "Andy's Baby"
