= Andy Taylor (The Andy Griffith Show) =

Sheriff of the fictional town Mayberry, from the show "The Andy Griffith Show"

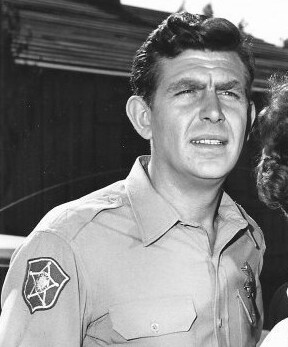
- Andy Griffith as Andy Taylor
- First appearance: "Danny Meets Andy Griffith" episode The Danny Thomas Show (1960)
- Last appearance: Return to Mayberry TV movie (1986)
- Created by: Sheldon Leonard
- Portrayed by: Andy Griffith

In-universe information
- Gender: Male
- Occupation: Sheriff (1952 - 1968; 1986 - ?); Agent of State Bureau of Investigation (1968 - ?); Postal Inspector (? - 1986); Justice of the Peace (? - 1968)
- Family: Barney Fife (cousin); Aunt Bee (Aunt); Uncle Ollie (uncle); Aunt Nora (aunt)
- Spouses: Unnamed wife (deceased); Helen Crump
- Children: Opie Taylor (son); Andrew Samuel Taylor, Jr. (son)

Sheriff Andrew Jackson "Andy" Taylor is the lead character on The Andy Griffith Show, an American sitcom which aired on CBS, (1960–1968). He also appears in the Gomer Pyle – USMC episode "Opie Joins the Marines," five episodes of Mayberry R.F.D. (1968–1971), and the reunion television film Return to Mayberry (1986). He made a cameo appearance in the Gomer Pyle – USMC episode "Gomer Goes Home." The character made his initial appearance in an episode of The Danny Thomas Show entitled "Danny Meets Andy Griffith." In the CBS special The Andy Griffith - Don Knotts - Jim Nabors Show (1965), Andy and Barney are featured in a musical sketch about their friendship and recreate some classic moments between the characters. Andy Griffith, as Sheriff Taylor, also has a brief comedy cameo in Rowan and Martin at the Movies (1969), a PSA short subject promoting the purchase of U.S. Savings Bonds. Griffith appeared with costar Ron Howard in character as Andy and Opie Taylor in a 2008 commercial for the presidential campaign of Barack Obama. Andy Taylor appeared in all 249 episodes of The Andy Griffith Show and was played by comedian, musician, and actor Andy Griffith.

== Home life ==
Andy Taylor lives in the fictional, sleepy community of Mayberry, North Carolina. Andy is a widower and father to one young son, Opie. In the backdoor pilot episode from The Danny Thomas Show, viewers learn Andy lost his wife when Opie was "the least little speck of a baby." In the first episode of the show Andy has a maid who is getting married and moving away.

== Work life ==
Andy is Mayberry's sheriff and justice of the peace. He has held the elected job of sheriff since approximately 1952 or 1953.

As sheriff, Andy is the chief law enforcement officer in the county, yet most of his activity is in and around the town of Mayberry, and there is no evidence of a separate city police force. Both the town and the county are named Mayberry, so Andy is the chief law enforcement officer for both. These working conditions, plus his reliance on a single deputy (and no clerk or jailer), indicate that the county is very small in both size and population; however, in the episode Mountain Wedding, Andy and Barney get up at four o'clock in the morning to get an "early start" on their trip to the Darlings' cabin, which is described as being "up in the mountains." When they arrive, it is full daylight, so it could be inferred that Mayberry County is larger than originally thought and with mountainous areas, but sparsely populated. Andy and Barney both work the courthouse during daytime hours and rotate shifts at night. The length of night duties is never specified; however, it appears the only time either spends all night at the courthouse is when a prisoner, other than regular inmate Otis Campbell, is incarcerated. One confusing aspect of Andy's authority, however, is his apparent subservience to the town mayor, a plot device which is utilized in several episodes throughout the course of the series - including Season 3's "The Cow Thief" - but which makes no sense in real life, since both are elected officials. Additionally, since Andy is elected countywide, while the mayor is a town official, his authority would actually - in most areas - exceed that of the mayor. This apparent dichotomy is never addressed during the run of the show.

In three first-season episodes, "The Manhunt," "A Feud Is a Feud," and "Barney Gets His Man," and in one second-season episode, "Aunt Bee the Warden," Andy wears a regular gunbelt. Also, the sixth-season episode, "Aunt Bee Takes a Job" with co-star Jack Burns, Andy fires a gun (which he borrows from Deputy Warren Ferguson) to disable a car in order to capture some criminals. Andy did have an issued sidearm (a Colt Official Police revolver) but rarely saw cause to carry the weapon. He kept it unloaded on top of a shelf in his house. On the rare occasion he needed a weapon fast, he would grab a rifle or shotgun from the rack in his office or from his car. Andy is an exceptional marksman as demonstrated in the season 2 episode "The Perfect Female," in which he actually loses a skeet shooting competition to a woman he is dating.

== Community life ==
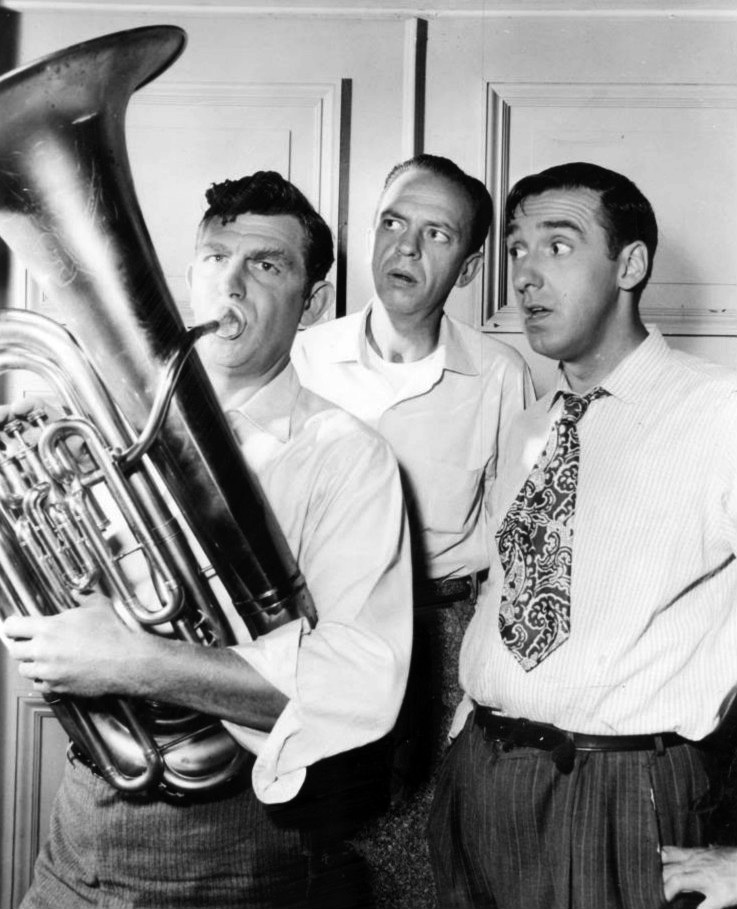
Andy helps the town band while Barney and Gomer look on.

One error here in Andy's community service is his being both the elected sheriff and a town council member; under North Carolina law he could not do both.

== Overview ==
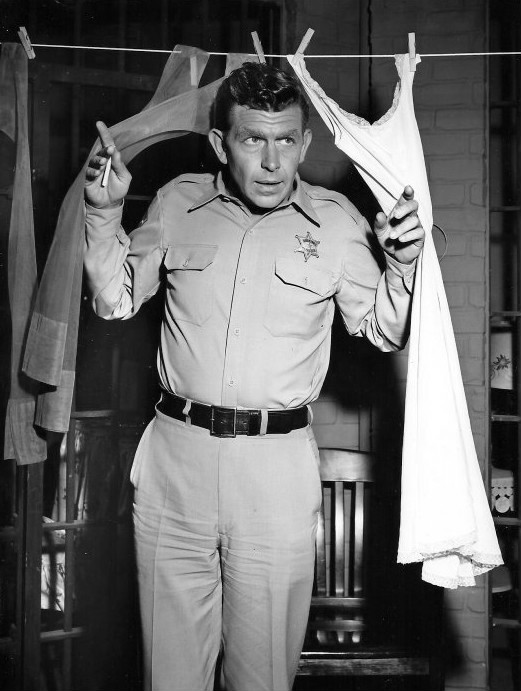
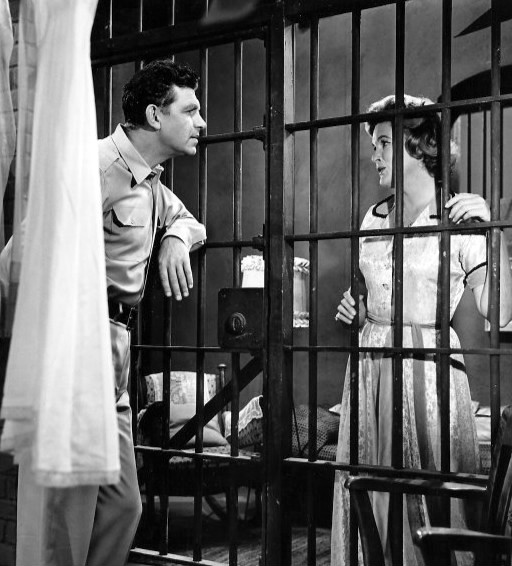
Mayberry's jail after a woman arrested for speeding (Jean Hagen) makes herself at home in it.

Other relatives include Bee's sister Nora (who would also be Andy's aunt), who pays a visit in one episode. In another episode, Andy tells Barney that Aunt Bee is heavily against alcohol due to her brother's trouble with the bottle. It is unclear whether this brother is meant to be Andy's father or one of Andy's uncles. Andy's parents are not seen, heard, or discussed in any episode, and appear to have died some time ago.

Andy went to school in Mayberry and graduated from Mayberry Union High. One 3rd-season episode #19 "Class Reunion" had Andy and Barney finding their old high school yearbook—the pictures are the actual high school photographs of Andy Griffith and Don Knotts. Their year of graduation was set in 1945, implying they were born between 1926-1928 (likely 1927). In the yearbook, Andy's middle name is listed as Jackson. Barney's middle name is listed as Milton. In a later episode, Andy's middle name is Samuel. Over the length of the series, Barney had three different middle names. Andy's first job was working in the movie theater.

He also mentions being in France "during the war" in the episode, "Ellie Comes to Town". In this instance, Andy is behind the drugstore counter riffing to Aunt Bee about a perfume with a French name, so it could be that Andy is simply being facetious. He also later mentions being in Africa and that he was a First Sergeant. (President Harry Truman declared an official end to World War II on the last day of 1946-thus Andy could have indeed been in World War II but too late to see any action.) Just to make matters more confusing, in Season 6 episode, "The Return of Barney Fife," it is claimed that Barney is coming back to town for Andy and Barney's high school class reunion, class of 1948. So evidently the producers of the show did not create a timeline for this character and stick to it.

In an episode where Barney tries to find Andy a wife, Andy admits that he misses having a wife to come home to after work. If Andy's wife died the year Opie was born, they may have been married only two or three years. This could explain why Opie was an only child.

Andy was depicted as a country-smart sheriff and a caring, nurturing father. His laid-back approach to law enforcement made him an ideal sheriff for the sleepy town. Andy is known to have shot only one man in his position as sheriff, which is the key event surrounding the episode High Noon in Mayberry. Apparently, Andy shot the suspect in the leg in 1952 (Andy’s first year as sheriff) during an armed robbery; in the latter of the episode, the suspect returns to Mayberry to present Andy with a shotgun as a gesture for having forced him away from his criminal lifestyle, giving him a chance to rethink his life and get back on track. In the episode "Aunt Bee Takes A Job," Andy grabs Warren's pistol and fires it in pursuit of two counterfeiters on their vehicle as they are attempting to flee. The sheriff badges worn by Andy and Barney are six point stars; the stars on their shoulder patches have five points.

Andy regularly used reverse psychology on people making them see the error of their ways. He would help transgressors by enabling them to draw their own moral conclusions. Andy had a keen eye for booby traps and often shielded Barney from both career and social landmines. Andy's pride in and love for his hometown is very evident in his work and his home life.

Early shows depict Andy as having a naïve demeanor and "aw-shucks" personality with home-spun humor which, actually, cover a wise and insightful outlook into people and situations, sometimes catching those who misjudge his intelligence off guard. Barney is often depicted as having grandiose opinions of his ability as a law enforcement officer, resulting in embarrassing situations which Andy wisely covers without hurting Barney's already sensitive nature.

As the series progresses, Andy evokes three primary personalities. Andy’s initial “aw-shucks” persona evolves during the late 1st and early 2nd seasons into moral no-nonsense, albeit easy-going charter traits, which serve in mediation for the problems of other sitcom characters, especially Barney. Later shows, particularly those after Barney's departure, coincidentally in color, depict Andy as serious, stressed and often frustrated by the situations arising in each episode; in lieu of his sense of humor from earlier episodes, most of the humor is from Andy's consternation with others. The incompetency of others, which Andy good-naturedly dismisses in earlier seasons, exasperates and often angers him in later episodes.

== Famous quotes ==
"Well, I'll be." (Spoken by Andy when he's excited or surprised in a good way.)

"I appreciate it and good night." (Spoken by Andy in the sponsor spots, when he's "advertising".)

"You beat everything, you know that?" (Spoken by Andy when Barney makes a bad mistake.)

"Now, now, Opie." (Spoken by Andy when he's trying to explain something to his son, Opie.)

"Simmer down." (Spoken by Andy when someone is overly excited.)

"That was extry good!" (Spoken by Andy when someone performs something well.)

== The mystery of Opie's mother ==
When the series opens, several years have passed since Opie's mother died. Andy mentions in the backdoor pilot from The Danny Thomas Show that he "lost" Opie's mother when Opie was "the least little speck of a baby." Opie is 6 years old when the show opens (born in 1954), and it is more than likely (based on Andy's testimony) that Opie's mother died at Opie's birth or shortly thereafter. Andy would have been 27 or 28 when Opie was born in 1954. It is mentioned numerous times during the series that Andy is a widower.

Andy's late wife is spoken of extremely rarely, and even then only very fleetingly and obliquely. Her name is never mentioned through the entire run of the series; she is never seen in a photo or in a flashback; also, we never meet (or hear mention of) any of her relatives, nor any of her friends. We are also never given any details about when or how she and Andy met, or their marriage, or their life together. In fact, aside from marrying Andy, giving birth to Opie, and dying (of unspecified causes) -- all within perhaps a year or two of each other -- there are no details of any sort about her that are shared with the audience.

== Andy's romances ==
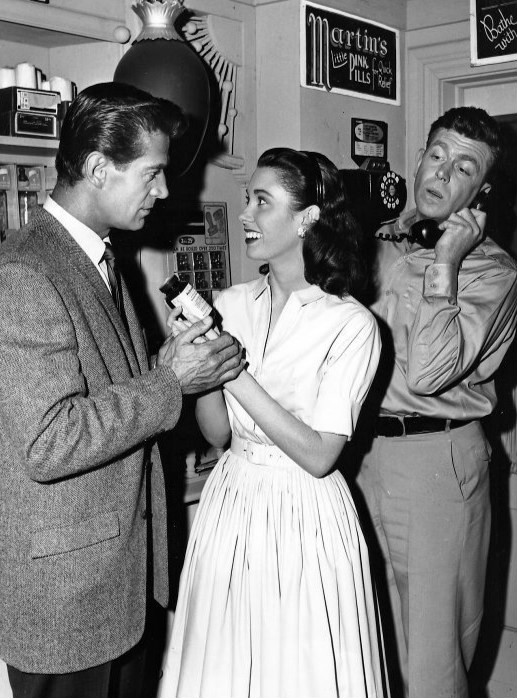
Andy is very interested in the conversation between Ellie and Mayberry's new doctor (George Nader).

Andy had several love interests through the show's run, but his first romantic relationship on the series is Ellie Walker (Elinor Donahue). In one episode Andy has difficulty asking Ellie for a date, which differs from the typical confidence he displays in his later romances. Griffith later admitted that because he had a hard time showing affection on screen, the relationship did not appear to be real or believable. source In Season Two, Andy dated a few women, including championship skeet-shooter Karen Moore, a cousin of Thelma Lou (only in one episode), and County Nurse Mary Simpson (played by two different actresses Julie Adams and Sue Ane Langdon). In early Season Three, Andy dated Peggy McMillan (Joanna Moore), another nurse, who chalked up four appearances on the show. In "Class Reunion", Andy was reunited with an old girlfriend, Sharon DeSpain. On a number of occasions, Barney meddled into Andy's romantic life and tried to arrange dates for him, which invariably turned out to be ill-suited or embarrassing matches. One of those attempted arranged dates was with the odd, socially inept Lydia Crosswaithe.

The producers created a long-term love interest in school teacher, Helen Crump. Helen made her first appearance in the third season and remained Andy's love interest throughout the rest of the series. In several episodes Barney falsely believes the couple is heading toward engagement, which results in widespread confusion and disruption among the main characters. In “Andy’s Old Girlfriend” (Season 7), Andy’s old flame, Alice Harper, returns to Mayberry causing tension between Andy and Helen. In “Helen the Authoress” (Season 7), Andy, jealous of Helen’s prospects as a children’s author, dates Mavis Neff. Andy and Helen were eventually married in the first Mayberry R.F.D. episode in 1968. The newlywed Taylors remained in Mayberry, and Andy was featured on several episodes of the spinoff series. Andy and Helen returned to Mayberry RFD for their son Andrew Samuel Taylor, Jr.'s christening in the 2nd-season premiere episode "Andy's Baby" (Sept. 1969), in which it was explained that Andy was now an agent for the "State Bureau of Investigation" and that he and Helen live in Charlotte, where Opie is attending high school. Their departure (and Opie's) is further explained during RFD's 2nd season in the episode "The Caper," when Howard Sprague reads a letter about the family's relocation, explaining that Mayberry now relies on Goober as a part-time Deputy Sheriff and has contracted with the State Police for serious matters. In 1986 the Taylors returned for the made-for-TV reunion movie Return to Mayberry. The movie explained that Andy has retired as Postal Inspector in Cleveland and returned home to see Opie into fatherhood and seek the office of sheriff again. Andrew Samuel Taylor, Jr. wasn't seen or mentioned.

== Reception ==
In polls and editorials, Andy has been routinely ranked as one of the greatest TV fathers, praised for being "the kind of father that every kid deserves—a kind, understanding and compassionate man with a sense of humor and a load of common sense." He placed 8th on TV Guide's list of the "Top 50 TV Dads." On the lists created by About.com's Fatherhood section Sheriff Andy Taylor is named the greatest TV father of all time. Tampa Bay Online's public poll also voted him the greatest father in pop culture history, including both television and film, with 82% of the vote.

In 2018, retired Akron Beacon Journal writer Rich Heldenfels said he believed Andy Griffith was never nominated for an Emmy because he "just made the acting look too easy" and because the character was so much like Griffith that "his timing and other skills did not seem as apparent."
