= Aunt Bee =

Fictional TV character

- Aunt Bee’s first appearance, "The New Housekeeper" (1960).
- First appearance: "The New Housekeeper"
- Last appearance: "The Mynah Bird" (Mayberry R.F.D.)
- Created by: Sheldon Leonard
- Portrayed by: Frances Bavier

In-universe information
- Gender: Female
- Occupation: Homemaker
- Family: Andy Taylor (nephew); Opie Taylor (great-nephew); Andy Taylor Jr. (great-nephew); Nora (sister); Ollie (brother-in-law); Bradford J. Taylor (cousin)

Aunt Bee is a fictional character from the 1960 American television sitcom The Andy Griffith Show played by Frances Bavier. The character migrated to the spinoff Mayberry R.F.D. (1968–1971) when The Andy Griffith Show ended its run in 1968, and remained for two years. Though she was the aunt of Sheriff Andy Taylor, virtually every character in Mayberry, even those in her age bracket such as Floyd and Emmett, called her "Aunt Bee".

== Black-and-white seasons (1960–1965) ==
In "The New Housekeeper", the show's first episode, Aunt Bee returns from Morgantown, West Virginia after Andy's housekeeper, Rose, marries and leaves. Andy explains to Opie that he was raised by Aunt Bee, and Bee later mentions, without elaboration, having raised other Taylors. In the course of several of Bee's romantic episodes, it is mentioned she has never married, so she carries the Taylor name by birth, not marriage. Therefore, although it is never elaborated upon, Bee must be the sister of Andy's never-discussed father. In several episodes, Bee makes reference to "a brother," but it is never specified if the brother in question is Andy's father or another uncle. It is never explained why her name "Beatrice" has the shortened spelling "B-e-e" as opposed to the more common "B-e-a."

Bee is well known in Mayberry for her cooking skills. In the first episode, she serves a platter of fried chicken with all the trimmings, and thereafter her character is associated with wholesome, home-cooked meals. She frequently contributes meals to community or church events and brings picnic baskets of food to Mayberry's tiny jail for its lawmen and inmates. Although Aunt Bee is generally a good cook, her marmalade and pickles are poorly regarded. Andy and Barney refer to her pickles as "kerosene cucumbers" and her marmalade as smelling like "ammonia" – though they keep these opinions from her, so as not to hurt her feelings. Her other food is very well regarded, and Andy is especially fond of her pork chops and cornbread.

Aunt Bee's other relatives sometimes come up in episodes; she speaks of having trimmed her brother's hair when a girl and, in one episode, her sister Nora visits. She also has a rapscallion cousin called Bradford J. Taylor who features in a color episode. Bee is a teetotaler. In an episode in which a traveling salesman comes to Mayberry peddling patent medicine, Andy tells Barney that Aunt Bee is heavily against alcohol due to her brother's trouble with the bottle. In the same episode, Bee plays the piano and speaks of her baptism, implying she is a Christian. Bee is a member of the town choir and sings in church.

== Color seasons (1965–1968) ==
Bee undergoes some changes during the final three color years of The Andy Griffith Show. In the show's early years, she is given to wearing comically dowdy house dresses, fruit- and flower-decorated hats, and ladylike white gloves for venturing outside the house. In the color episodes, she discards her frumpy wardrobe and steps into more stylish attire.

In the color seasons, Bee's suitors are more respectable gentlemen, and include a retired congressman, clergyman and professor.

More drastic in the evolution of the character than her taste-shift in men and her wardrobe about-face is her liberation from her homemaker role in Andy's house. In the later episodes, Bee leaves the Taylor kitchen to open her own restaurant, to host a television cooking show, to run for office, to buy a car, and to take flying lessons. Andy and Opie occasionally cook for themselves, at which they prove adequately competent, as opposed to several early-season episodes in which Andy seems incapable of making soup or sandwiches without catastrophic kitchen mishaps.

Aunt Bee sees Opie grow from age 6 to 14. When Andy marries his longtime girlfriend Helen Crump on the spinoff Mayberry R.F.D., she opts to give the newlyweds their own space and becomes housekeeper for farmer Sam Jones (another widowed father) and his young son Mike. Residing at the Jones farm, Aunt Bee feeds the livestock and gathers eggs. The following year Andy and Helen move to Raleigh. After two years as Sam's housekeeper, Aunt Bee leaves the Jones household for unspecified reasons to be replaced as housekeeper by Sam's cousin, Alice Cooper (Alice Ghostley). This is the last we see of Aunt Bee.

== Cultural impact ==
There is a small museum dedicated to the character in Mount Airy, North Carolina.

In 1991, Rutledge Hill Press released a tie-in book, Aunt Bee's Mayberry Cookbook featuring food from the show.

== Bibliography ==
- The Andy Griffith Show: Complete Series Collection. Paramount, 2007. (ISBN 1415731594)
- Beck, Ken, and Clark, Jim. The Andy Griffith Show Book. St. Martin's Griffin, 2000.
- Kelly, Richard. The Andy Griffith Show. Blair, 1984.
