= Savages (1974 film) =

- Original network advertisement
- Genre: Thriller
- Based on: Deathwatch by Robb White
- Written by: William Wood
- Directed by: Lee H. Katzin
- Starring: Andy Griffith; Sam Bottoms; Noah Beery, Jr.; James Best; Randy Boone; Jim Antonio; James Chandler
- Music by: Murray MacLeod; The Orphanage
- Country of origin: United States
- Original language: English

Production
- Producers: Leonard Goldberg; Aaron Spelling
- Cinematography: Tim Southcott
- Editor: John Woodcock
- Running time: 74 minutes
- Production companies: Spelling-Goldberg Productions; 20th Century Fox Television

Original release
- Network: ABC
- Release: September 11, 1974

Savages is a 1974 American television thriller film directed by Lee H. Katzin and based on the 1972 novel Deathwatch by Robb White. It stars Andy Griffith and Sam Bottoms.

== Synopsis ==
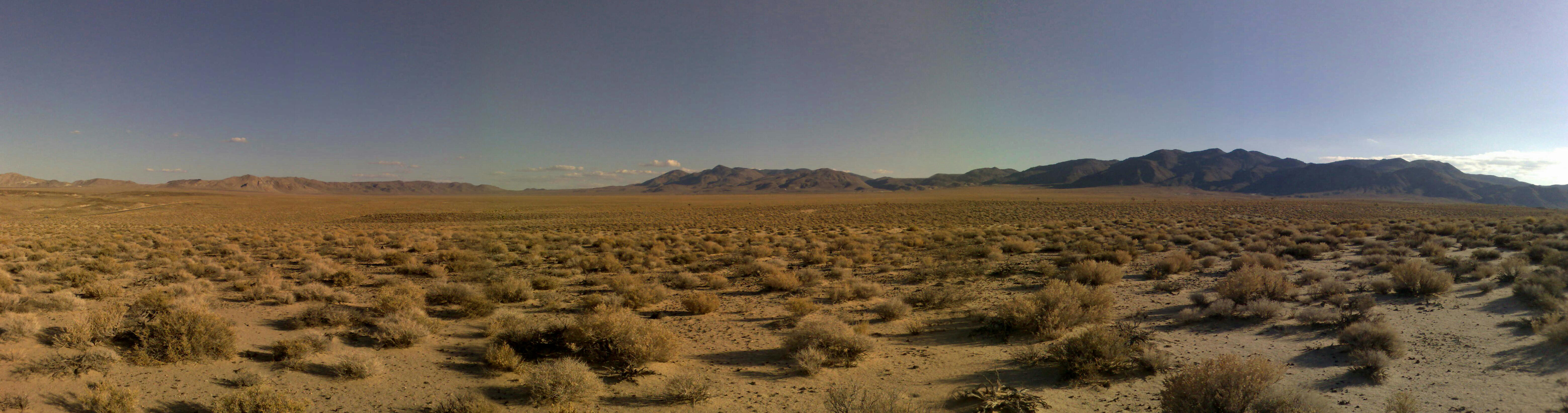
The Mojave Desert

A successful Los Angeles lawyer and hunter, Horton Madec (Andy Griffith), receives a rare permit to hunt bighorn sheep in the nearby Mojave Desert. He hires a timid college student currently working as a filling station attendant named Ben (Sam Bottoms), who will drive him into the desert with his Jeep CJ and help show Madec where the bighorn are. Ben is studying to be a geologist, so therefore he knows the desert very well. After Madec accidentally shoots a ewe with his .30-06 Winchester Model 70 rifle, he buries it and although Ben is disappointed, he agrees that they should pretend like the incident never happened. However, Ben realizes that what Madec shot was no female sheep; upon noting a bloody human hand underneath the grass. Horrified, Ben digs it up and realizes that Madec has actually shot a local prospector named Winnie Haas, who was Ben's friend and mentor. Madec apologizes, but argues that he cannot afford to sit in jail, as he is too important and has a family to take care of. Refusing to cover it up, Ben argues that the honest thing to do would be for the two of them to report the accidental shot, but Madec refuses, even going as far to bribe Ben with thousands of dollars just to keep quiet about the incident. It is then that Madec decides to eliminate the only witness to the crime - Ben.

Madec forces Ben to strip down to nothing but his shorts at gunpoint. He intends to make up a story saying that the two became separated, then Ben went crazy, tore off all his clothes and died within a matter of hours due to dehydration and heat. Ben attempts to escape by walking 45 miles to the nearest highway. Madec watches Ben the entire distance while aiming at him with his rifle. After trying to climb the nearby Big Lizard butte, Ben is shot by Madec, causing him to fall and injure his back. Time is running out as he begins to hallucinate. Suffering from dehydration, hunger, sunburn, and his gunshot wounds, Ben needs to find water, food, shelter, and a weapon. Ben later gets a slingshot from the prospector's tent and uses it to breathe after he buries himself to avoid Madec finding him. Ben eventually uses survival techniques the prospector taught him to locate water inside a cave, later overpowering Madec by lighting his tent on fire, distracting him and allowing him to shoot Madec in the hand with the slingshot. He then drives them back to town and attempts to convince the local police to believe his story; however, Madec's story is more meticulously detailed and convincing to them. Madec claims that Ben shot the prospector after a drunken dispute, backing up his story by stating that he never knew the prospector. As the police cannot find the slingshot, either, they have to go with Madec's story. However, right as Madec is preparing to leave town and filling up with gasoline, there is something lodged in the pump. Ben unclogs it by putting a pole into the underground tank and unearthing the slingshot which Madec had earlier put there and hidden from the police. The local police believe Ben's story and tell Madec to get a lawyer, only for Madec to reply that he is a lawyer. They apologize to Ben for the confusion and Ben replies that he only wanted to report an accident.

== Cast ==
- Andy Griffith as Horton Madec
- Sam Bottoms as Ben Campbell
- Noah Beery Jr. as George Whiting
- James Best as Sheriff Bert Hamilton
- Randy Boone as Deputy Dickie Haycroft
- Jim Antonio as Deputy Les Hanford
- James Chandler as The Doctor

== Production ==
The casting of Griffith and Bottoms was announced in June 1974.

== Reception ==
The Los Angeles Times called the film "riveting, chilling".

== Remake ==
40 years later, this film was remade in 2014 as Beyond the Reach with Michael Douglas and Jeremy Irvine in the roles originally played by Andy Griffith and Sam Bottoms, respectively.

== See also ==
- List of American films of 1974
- Beyond the Reach
