= Baby Ruth =

American candy bar

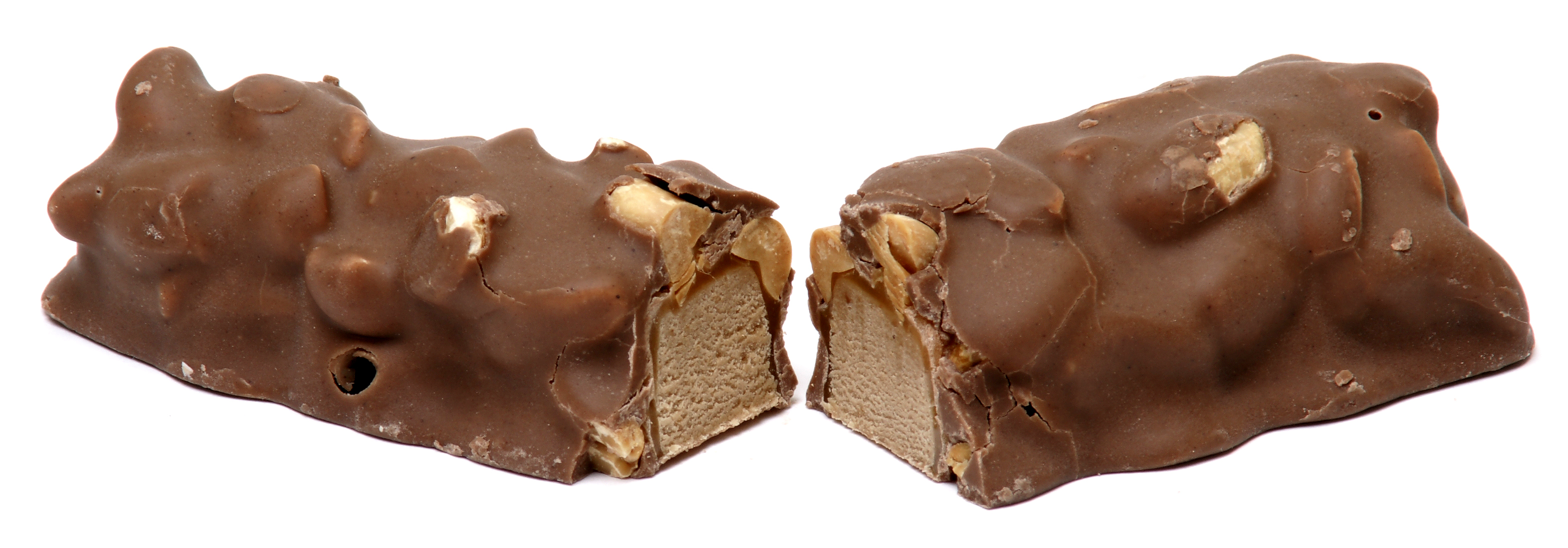
- Product type: Confectionery
- Current owner: Ferrara Candy Company
- Country: United States
- Introduced: 1920; 106 years ago
- Previous owners: Curtiss Candy Company; RJR Nabisco; Nestlé
- Website: www.babyruth.com

Baby Ruth is an American candy bar made of peanuts, caramel, and milk chocolate-flavored nougat, covered in compound chocolate. Created in 1920, it is manufactured by the Ferrara Candy Company, a subsidiary of Ferrero.

== History ==
In 1920, the Curtiss Candy Company refashioned its Kandy Kake into the Baby Ruth, and it became the best-selling confection in the five-cent confectionery category by the late 1920s. The bar was a staple of the Chicago-based company for more than six decades.

Curtiss was purchased by Nabisco in 1981. In 1990, RJR Nabisco sold the Curtiss brands to Nestlé. Ferrero acquired Nestlé USA's confectionery brands, including Baby Ruth, in 2018. Ferrero folded production of the acquired brands into the Ferrara Candy Company.

Ferrara relaunched Baby Ruth in December 2019. The new recipe includes dry-roasted peanuts grown in the United States, whereas previous versions contained peanuts roasted in oil. It also removed the food preservative TBHQ.

== Etymology ==
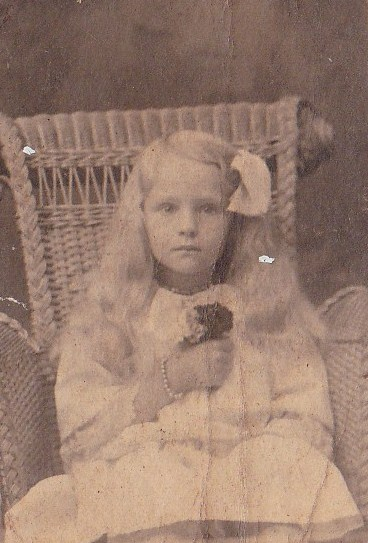
Ruth Cleveland, daughter of United States president Grover Cleveland, became the official corporate namesake for the "Baby Ruth" candy bar.

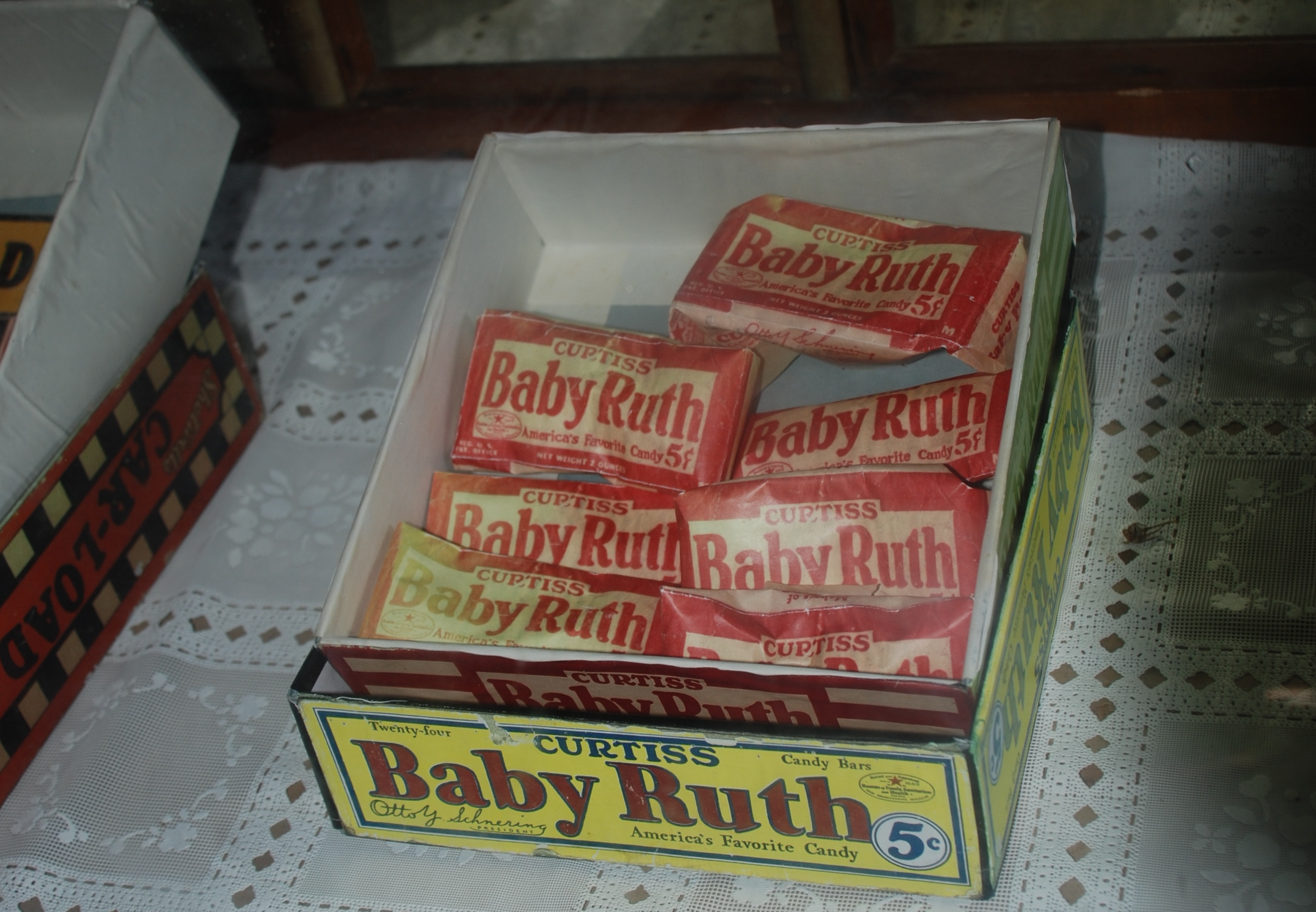
Box of Curtiss' Baby Ruth candy bars at a general store in Portsmouth, North Carolina

Although the name of the candy bar sounds like the name of the famous baseball player Babe Ruth, the Curtiss Candy Company claimed that it was named after President Grover Cleveland's daughter, Ruth Cleveland. The candy maker, located on the same street as Wrigley Field, named the bar "Baby Ruth" in 1921, as Babe Ruth's fame was on the rise, 24 years after Cleveland had left the White House, and 17 years after his daughter, Ruth, had died. The company did not negotiate an endorsement deal with Ruth, and many saw the company's story about the origin of the name to be a way to avoid having to pay the baseball player any royalties. In a trademark appeal, Curtiss successfully shut down a rival bar that was approved by, and named for, Ruth, on the grounds that the names were too similar.

In the trivia book series Imponderables, David Feldman reports the standard story about the bar being named for Grover Cleveland's daughter, with additional information that ties it to the President: "The trademark was patterned exactly after the engraved lettering of the name used on a medallion struck for the Chicago World's Columbian Exposition in 1893 and picturing the President, his wife, and daughter Baby Ruth." However, this may have been an after-the-fact covering maneuver. Feldman also cites More Misinformation, by Tom Burnam: "Burnam concluded that the candy bar was named ... after the granddaughter of Mr. and Mrs. George Williamson, candy makers who developed the original formula and sold it to Curtiss." (Williamson had also sold the "Oh Henry!" formula to Curtiss around that time.) The write-up goes on to note that marketing the product as being named for a company executive's granddaughter would likely have been less successful, hence their "official" story.

However, David Mikkelson of Snopes.com denies the claim that the Williamsons invented the recipe, as George Williamson was head of the Williamson Candy Company, producers of the Oh Henry! bar. He continues to say that "the Baby Ruth bar came about when Otto Schnering, founder of the Curtiss Candy Company, made some alterations to his company's first candy offering, a confection known as 'Kandy Kake'".

== Marketing ==
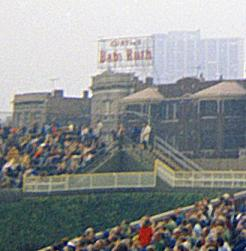
The Baby Ruth sign at Wrigley Field in Chicago

To promote the candy, company founder Otto Schnering chartered a plane in 1923 to drop thousands of Baby Ruth bars, each with its own miniature parachute, over the city of Pittsburgh. Thereafter, Schnering performed the parachute drops in various cities in over forty states.

In 1929, the Curtiss Candy Company sponsored The Baby Ruth Hour, a CBS Radio program.

As if to tweak their own official denial of the name's origin, after Babe Ruth's "called shot" at Chicago's Wrigley Field in the 1932 World Series, Curtiss installed an illuminated advertising sign for Baby Ruth on the roof of one of the flats across Sheffield Avenue, near where Ruth's home run ball had landed in center field. The sign stood for some four decades before being removed.

In 1985, Nabisco paid $100,000 for the product placement of Baby Ruth to appear in the film The Goonies.

In 1992, the company sponsored Bill Davis Racing's NASCAR Busch Grand National Series #1 Ford for future NASCAR superstar Jeff Gordon. The following year, the sponsorship moved to Jeff Burton's #8 Ford.

In 1995, a company representing the Ruth estate licensed his name and likeness for use in a Baby Ruth marketing campaign.

On p. 34 of the spring 2007 edition of the Chicago Cubs game program, there is a full-page ad showing a partially unwrapped Baby Ruth in front of the Wrigley ivy, with the caption, "The official candy bar of major league baseball, and proud sponsor of the Chicago Cubs."

Continuing the baseball-oriented theme, during the summer and post-season of the 2007 season, a TV ad for the candy bar showed an entire stadium (identified as Dodger Stadium) filled with people munching Baby Ruths, and thus having to hum rather than singing along with "Take Me Out to the Ball Game" during the seventh-inning stretch.

== Ingredients ==
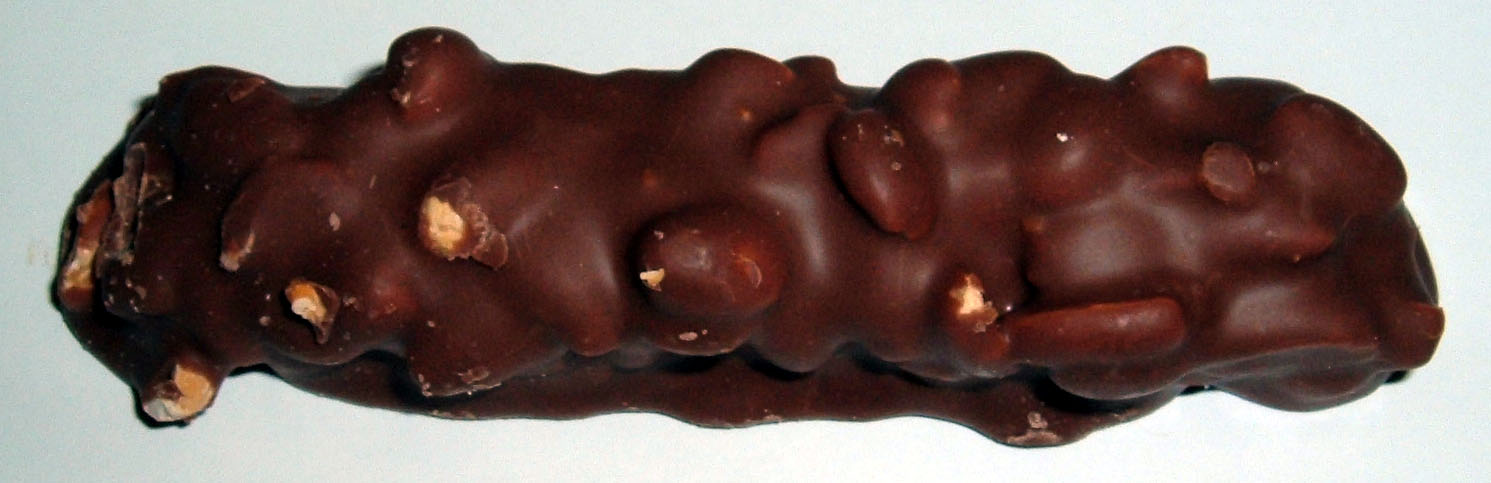
A Baby Ruth bar

The original flavor U.S. edition, listed by weight in decreasing order, contains sugar, roasted peanuts, corn syrup, partially hydrogenated palm kernel and coconut oil, nonfat milk, cocoa, high-fructose corn syrup and less than 1% of glycerin, whey (from milk), dextrose, salt, egg, monoglyceride, soy lecithin, soybean oil, natural and artificial flavors, carrageenan, TBHQ, citric acid (to preserve freshness) and caramel color.

Current ingredients used by Ferrero: (in descending order) sugar, dry roasted peanuts, corn syrup, hydrogenated vegetable oil (palm kernel, coconut, and soybean), nonfat milk, cocoa, less than 2% high fructose corn syrup, dairy product solids, glycerin, dextrose, salt, soy lecithin, lactic acid esters, carrageenan.

== Sizes ==
In addition to the single 1.9 ounce (53.8-gram) bar (sold in packages as Full Size), Baby Ruth is also sold in a 3.7-ounce (100 g) (King Size), a 3.3-ounce (93.5 g) Share Pack (two pieces), and in packages of Fun Size and Miniatures.

== Related products ==
Nestlé produces a Baby Ruth ice cream bar with a milk chocolate coating, chocolate-covered peanuts, and a vanilla-and-nougat flavored ice cream center. Nestlé also produces Baby Ruth Crisp bars, which are chocolate-covered wafer cookies, with a caramel-flavored cream and crushed peanuts. This is part of a line of Nestlé products under the Crisp name, including Nestlé Crunch Crisp and Butterfinger Crisp.

== In popular culture ==
A popular 1956 song, "A Rose and a Baby Ruth", was written by John D. Loudermilk and recorded by George Hamilton IV.

The Baby Ruth bar is infamously featured in a scene in the 1980 movie Caddyshack that takes place at a pool party, in which the bar is mistaken for human feces.

== See also ==
- Butterfinger
