= A Rose and a Baby Ruth =

Single by George Hamilton IV
- B-side: "If You Don't Know"
- Released: October 1956
- Genre: Pop
- Length: 2:02
- Label: ABC-Paramount
- Songwriter: John D. Loudermilk

George Hamilton IV singles chronology
| "A Rose and a Baby Ruth" (1956) | "High School Romance" (1957) |

"A Rose and a Baby Ruth" is a song written by John D. Loudermilk under his "Johnny Dee" pseudonym. The song, which partially refers to the Baby Ruth candy bar, was published in 1956. The best-known version was recorded by George Hamilton IV. The song reached number 6 on the Billboard magazine pop chart and spent 20 weeks on the chart.

"A Rose and a Baby Ruth" showed regional appeal in country music, foreshadowing Hamilton's highly successful career, in the 1960s.

== Chart performance ==
| Chart (1956–57) | Peak position |
|---|---|
| Billboard Top 100 | 6 |
| Billboard Best Sellers in Stores | 7 |
| Billboard Most Played by Jockeys | 7 |
| Billboard Most Played in Juke Boxes | 8 |

== Covers ==
On the same date Billboard reviewed George Hamilton IV´s original version, in October 1956, they reviewed a competing cover sung by Eddie Fontaine and released by Decca. Billboard predicted it would be a close race between the two recordings, but the Decca release did not make even the lower part of Billboard's Top 100.

Johnny Maestro & The Crests did a version in 1960 for their first album, The Crests Sing All Biggies - (Coed LP 901).

Al Kooper covered it on his 1970 Columbia release Easy Does It.

The song was covered by Marilyn Manson as a bonus studio track on the limited-edition version of The Last Tour On Earth live album in 1999.

== Singles ==
=== By George Hamilton IV ===
- (1956) A Rose and a Baby Ruth/If You Don't Know-ABC Paramount Records
- (1956) A Rose and a Baby Ruth/If You Don't Know-Colonial Records With the Country Gentlemen, Featuring Joe Tanner on guitar
