= The Bluenotes =

- Origin: North Carolina
- Genres: Vocal
- Years active: 1955–1960
- Labels: Colonial; Brooke
- Past members: Tom Underwood; Joe Tanner; Pat Patterson; Ralph Harrington

The Bluenotes were a vocal group from Asheboro, North Carolina featuring Tom Underwood, Joe Tanner (who also played guitar), Pat Patterson, and Ralph Harrington. They recorded for the Colonial and Brooke record labels. Their first recordings were released as the Blue Notes in 1955 and 1956 for Colonial records of Chapel Hill, N.C. By their third Colonial release, "Page One/Mighty Low" (released in 1957) they reverted to spelling their group name as one word (Bluenotes) which continued throughout the group's lifespan. Besides their own releases, they also created vocal backing for other Colonial recording artists including George Hamilton IV (on his hit song "A Rose And A Baby Ruth"), Johnny Dee (Loudermilk) on several of his Colonial releases, Billy Craddock, Doug Franklin and Henry Wilson. "My Lucky Love/Drizzlin' Rain" (Colonial 777), which they recorded with Doug Franklin, was their first release to chart reaching # 73 in September 1958. Moving over to the Brooke label in Asheboro, N.C. in 1959, the Bluenotes had their second hit record with their first release for the label "I Don't Know What It Is / You Can't Get Away From Love" (Brooke 111) which reached # 61 in early 1960. They released two other singles for Brooke Records (one featuring group member Ralph Harrington who also had some occasional solo releases on Colonial) before disbanding.

Joe Tanner, during his tenure with the Bluenotes wrote, arranged and produced many songs including "Only One Love" (George Hamilton IV), and "Sittin' in the Balcony" (John D. Loudermilk) where he provided the distinctive lead guitar break which was copied nearly note for note later by Eddie Cochran on his Liberty recording of the song. After the breakup of The Bluenotes he relocated to Nashville following John D. Loudermilk, where his success continued. He worked with Roy Orbison for many years arranging and conducting the recording session for "In Dreams", writing the million seller "Evergreen" as well as playing the memorable guitar riff on Orbison's hit song, "Oh, Pretty Woman".

The “Oh Pretty Woman” guitar riff is in contention… Some say the part was played by Joe Tanner (although he was not booked for that session). Others say, one of the session players borrowed Tanners guitar (a custom made Rickenbaucher 12 String), lending itself to that unique sound.

== Singles ==
=== Colonial Records ===
- Colonial 408 The Blue Notes "Christmas Chimes/There'll Always Be A Christmas" (1955)
- Colonial 409 The Blue Notes "On A Sleepy Sunday Afternoon/Who's Gonna Sing Your Love Songs" (1956)
- Colonial 433 Johnny Dee with the Bluenotes "Teenage Queen/It's Gotta Be You" (1957)
- Colonial 434 The Bluenotes featuring Doug Franklin "Mighty Low/Page One" (1957)
- Colonial 721 Bill Craddock with the Bluenotes "Birddoggin'/Millionaire" (1957)
- Colonial 722 Johnny Dee with the Bluenotes "They Were Right/Somebody Sweet" (1957)
- Colonial 7777 Doug Franklin with the Bluenotes "My Lucky Love/Drizzlin' Rain" (1958)
- Colonial 7778 Henry Wilson with the Bluenotes "Are You Ready/It's Really Love" (1958)
- Colonial 7779 The Bluenotes "You're a Tiger/Let Her Know" (1958)
- Colonial 9999 The Bluenotes "I Waited/Never Never Land" (1959)

=== Brooke Records ===
- Brooke 111 "I Don't Know What It Is/You Can't Get Away from Love" (1959)
- Brooke 116 "Forever on My Mind/I'm Gonna Find Out" (1960)
- Brooke 119 "It Had to Be You/Summer Love" (1960)"featuring Ralph Harrington"
