= Easy Does It (Al Kooper album) =

Studio album by Al Kooper
- Released: August 1970
- Recorded: 1969
- Genre: Rock
- Length: 61:56
- Label: Columbia
- Producer: Al Kooper

Al Kooper chronology
| You Never Know Who Your Friends Are (1969) | Easy Does It (1970) | New York City (You're a Woman) (1971) |

Singles from Easy Does It
- 1. "Brand New Day" Released: June 16, 1970; 2. "I Got a Woman" Released: September 28, 1970

Professional ratings
Review scores
| Source | Rating |
|---|---|
| AllMusic | 4/5 stars |
| The Encyclopedia of Popular Music | 4/5 stars |

Easy Does It is the third solo album by American singer-songwriter Al Kooper, recorded and released in 1970 for Columbia Records.

A double album, Easy Does It featured Kooper on an expanded number of instruments, including sitar (used to effect on the country-tinged "Sad, Sad Sunshine"), vibes and electronic effects. While mostly backed by Bretheren rhythm section Stu Woods and Rick Marotta, Kooper also utilized groups in Nashville and Los Angeles to record the tracks for the album.

Two tracks were also featured on the soundtrack to the 1970 counter-culture film, The Landlord, "Brand New Day" and "Love Theme from The Landlord".

== Track listing ==
=== Side 1 ===
1. "Brand New Day" (Al Kooper) – 5:09
2. "Piano Solo Introduction to I Got a Woman"-2:00
3. "I Got a Woman" (Ray Charles, Renald Richard) – 4:30
4. "Country Road" (James Taylor) – 4:23
5. "I Bought You the Shoes (You're Walking Away In)" (Bob Brass, Irwin Levine, Kooper) – 1:58

=== Side 2 ===
1. "Introduction" - 0:50
2. "Easy Does It" (Kooper) – 5:24
3. "Buckskin Boy" (Kooper, Charlie Calello) – 3:11
4. "Love Theme from The Landlord" (Kooper) – 3:12

=== Side 3 ===
1. "Sad, Sad Sunshine" (Kooper) – 5:04
2. "Let the Duchess No" (John Gregory, Jim Roberts) – 3:17
3. "She Gets Me Where I Live" (Kooper, Charlie Calello) – 3:34
4. "A Rose and a Baby Ruth" (J.D. Loudermilk) – 3:29

=== Side 4 ===
1. "Baby, Please Don't Go" (Big Joe Williams) – 12:28
2. "God Sheds His Grace on Thee" (Kooper, Charlie Calello) – 3:28
- Note: some releases incorrectly list "Buckskin Boy" as 4:11 in the gatefold sleeve. 3:11 is the correct time.

== Personnel ==
=== Musicians ===
- Al Kooper – piano, organ, guitars, ondioline, sitar, vibraphone, prepared guitar, electronic effects, vocals
- Stu Woods – electric bass, backing vocal (tracks 1, 3–8 and 13–14)
- Rick Marotta – drums, backing vocal (tracks 1, 3–8 and 13–14)
- David Bromberg – pedal steel, guitar (tracks 5, 8 and 13)
- Tom Cosgrove – guitar (tracks 8 and 13)
- Lyle Ritz – electric bass (tracks 12 and 15)
- Earl Palmer – drums (tracks 12 and 15)
- Larry Knechtel – piano (tracks 12 and 15)
- Louie Shelton – guitar (tracks 12 and 15)
- Tommy Tedesco – guitar (tracks 12 and 15)
- Fred Lipsius – alto saxophone (track 3)
- Peter Ivers – harmonica (track 4)
- John Miller – electric bass (track 9)
- Al Rogers – drums (track 9)
- George Devens – percussion (track 9)
- Stu Scharf – guitar (track 9)
- Joe Beck – guitar (track 9)
- Joe Osborn – electric bass (track 10)
- Joe Correro – drums (track 10)
- Milt Holland – tabla (track 10)
- Keith Allison – guitar (track 10)
- Freddy Weller – guitar (track 10)
- Charlie McCoy – electric bass (track 11)
- Kenny Buttrey – drums (track 11)
- Pete Drake – pedal steel (track 11)
- Wayne Moss – guitar (track 11)
- Charlie Daniels – guitar (track 11)
- The Blossoms – backing vocal (track 11)
- Bobby Colomby – congas (track 14)
- Charlie Calello – string and horn arrangements (except tracks 12 and 15)
- Jackson Marlie – vocals
- Jimmie Haskell – arrangements and conductor (tracks 12 and 15)

=== Technical ===
- Al Kooper – producer
- Don Puluse, Neil Wilburn, Stan Tonkel, Sy Mitchell, Tim Geelan – engineers
- Mike Ruschack – mastering engineer
- Stan Weiss – remix engineer
