= Crisp (chocolate bar) =

Line of chocolate bars

Butterfinger Crisp

Nestlé Crunch Crisp

Baby Ruth Crisp

Nestlé Crisp is a line of wafer candy bars that are based on existing Nestlé brands and sold in the United States. There are currently three Crisp bars in production: the Butterfinger Crisp, the Baby Ruth Crisp and the Nestlé Crunch Crisp. Each package is made up of two small, individual bars.

The Crisp line is an offshoot of the original Butterfinger Crisp that came out in 2004, then later a Nestlé Crunch Crisp and finally the Baby Ruth Crisp. While the original Butterfinger and Nestlé Crunch Crisp were full-size candy bars, all the current Crisps follow the two small, individual bar packaging.

== See also ==
- Coffee Crisp—a different "Crisp" candy bar by Nestlé, sold in Canada
