= Butterfinger =

Candy bar

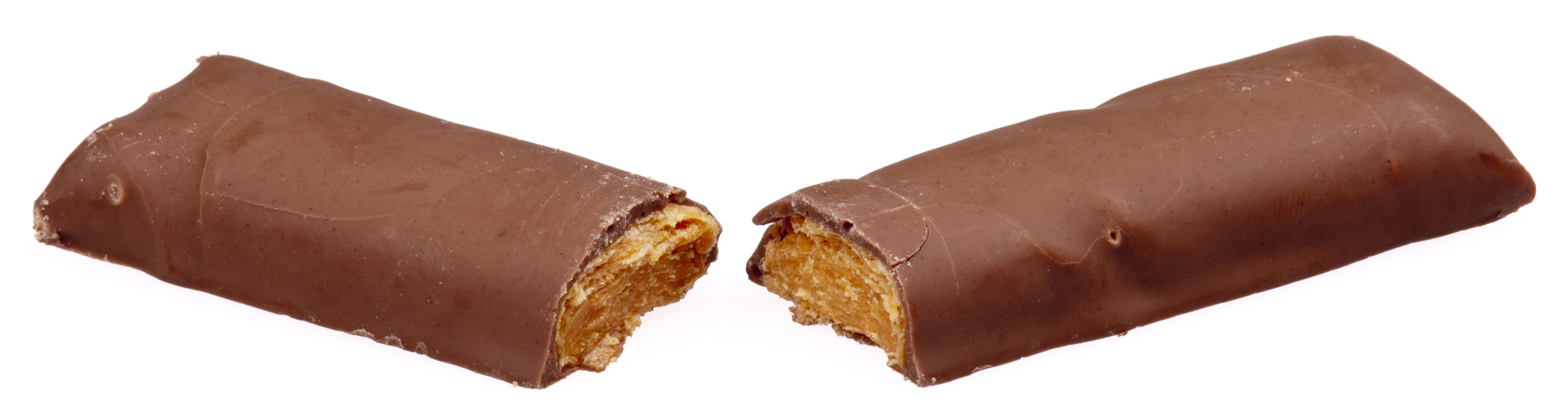
- Product type: Candy bar
- Current owner: Ferrara Candy Company (US) (since 2018)
- Country: United States
- Introduced: 1923; 103 years ago
- Previous owners: Nestlé (USA/International): Curtiss Candy Company (1923–1964); Standard Brands Inc. (1964–1981); Nabisco (1981–1985); RJR Nabisco (1985–1988); Kohlberg Kravis Roberts & Co. (1988–1990); Nestlé (1990–2018); Ferrero Group (since 2018)
- Website: www.butterfinger.com

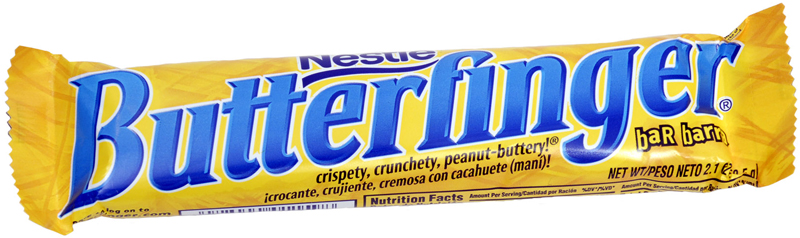
Nestlé version (1990–2018); this wrapper was used from 2001 to 2018 in the US.

Butterfinger is a candy bar manufactured by US-based Ferrara Candy Company, a subsidiary of Ferrero. It was formerly manufactured internationally by Nestlé. It consists of a layered crisp peanut butter core covered in a chocolate-like coating; the coating is not eligible to be described as chocolate, as it contains no cocoa butter. Butterfinger was invented by Otto Schnering of the Curtiss Candy Company in 1923. A popularity contest chose the name.

In its early years, the Butterfinger was promoted by Shirley Temple in the 1934 film Baby Take a Bow. It was advertised by characters from The Simpsons (most notably Bart Simpson) from 1988 to 2001.

== History ==
Butterfinger was invented by Otto Schnering in 1923. Schnering had founded the Curtiss Candy Company near Chicago, Illinois, in 1922. The company held a public contest to choose the name of this candy. In an early marketing campaign, the company dropped Butterfinger and Baby Ruth candy bars from airplanes in cities across the United States as a publicity stunt that helped increase its popularity.

The candy bar was also promoted in Baby Take a Bow, a 1934 film featuring Shirley Temple.

In 1964, Standard Brands, Inc. purchased the Curtiss Candy Company. It then merged with Nabisco in 1981. RJR Nabisco was formed in 1985 by the merger of Nabisco Brands and R. J. Reynolds Tobacco Company.

In December 1988, RJR Nabisco was purchased by Kohlberg Kravis Roberts & Co. in what was, at the time, the largest leveraged buyout in history. In February 1990, Nestlé, a Swiss multinational food and beverage company, bought Baby Ruth and Butterfinger from RJR Nabisco.

Butterfinger was withdrawn from the market in Germany in 1999, because of consumer rejection. It was one of the first products to be identified as containing genetically modified ingredients (GMOs) from corn. Butterfinger sales ended after a successful campaign by Greenpeace pushed Nestlé to remove the product from German supermarkets.

With sales in 2010 of $598 million, Butterfinger had become increasingly popular and was typically ranked as the eleventh most popular candy bar sold in the $17.68 billion United States chocolate confectionery market between 2007 and 2010.

In January 2018, Nestlé announced plans to sell over twenty of its US confectionery brands (including Butterfinger) to Italian chocolatier Ferrero SpA, for $2.8 billion. The deal was finalized in March 2018, and the brands were folded into the operations of the Ferrero Candy Company.

== Recipe change ==
Ferrero reformulated the Butterfinger in January 2019, with labels displaying "Improved Recipe". "Better" Butterfinger, as it is identified in advertising, uses runner peanuts in the bar's core that are roasted at the manufacturing plant. The new bar also uses a higher percentage of cocoa and milk in the "chocolatey" coating and cuts ingredients such as the preservative TBHQ and hydrogenated oils. The packaging was also upgraded to avoid spoilage. Some social media users criticized the new recipe.

== Advertising ==
Beginning in 1988, Butterfinger was advertised with The Simpsons, still a series of shorts in The Tracey Ullman Show at the time. The first commercial was the advertisement "The Butterfinger Group", which featured the debut of the character Milhouse Van Houten. The Simpsons was immediately popular and boosted the candy's popularity. In 1992, the Simpsons began to appear in Butterfinger BB's commercials. The Simpsons-Butterfinger marketing was phased out by 2001 but brought back in 2010.

Butterfinger campaigns include counting down the end of the world or BARmageddon, with evidence such as the first-ever, QR shaped crop circle in Kansas, a Butterfinger comedy-horror movie called “Butterfinger the 13th,” the first interactive digital graphic novel by a candy brand starring the Butterfinger Defense League, and several attention-grabbing April Fool's Day pranks, including the renaming of the candy bar to "The Finger".

On April 1, 2008, Nestlé launched an April Fool's Day prank in which they claimed that they had changed the name of the candy bar to "The Finger", citing consumer research that indicated that the original brand was "clumsy" and "awkward". The prank included a fake website promoting the change that featured a video press release. When the joke was revealed, the website redirected visitors to the fictitious "Butterfinger Comedy Network".

In 2009, a new advertisement for Butterfinger was produced that appeared to be a homage to the earlier The Simpsons commercials. In February 2010, Butterfinger revived its "Nobody better lay a finger..." slogan as "Nobody's gonna lay a finger on my Butterfinger".

In April 2013, an official announcement via the Twitter account of The Simpsons stated that the "Nobody better lay a finger on my Butterfinger" advertising campaign featuring Bart Simpson would be returning. In the opening sequence of "Treehouse of Horror XXVIII" (2017), the family appeared as candy in a bowl. Bart, a "Barterfinger" bar, tells his mother, Marge, a "Marge Bar", he is scared, and she comforts him by stating he was always the last to be taken.

In May 2024, the Simpsons returned for Butterfinger's 100th anniversary. Bart and Homer were featured on single and two-pack wrappers while the whole family was on Fun Size packaging.

== Sponsorships ==
Butterfinger sponsored pro Freestyle Motocross rider Nate Adams as well as pro BMX rider Ryan Nyquist in 2003. Butterfinger also sponsored Blushi and other Twitch streamers in 2023.

== Variations ==
Butterfinger Snackerz

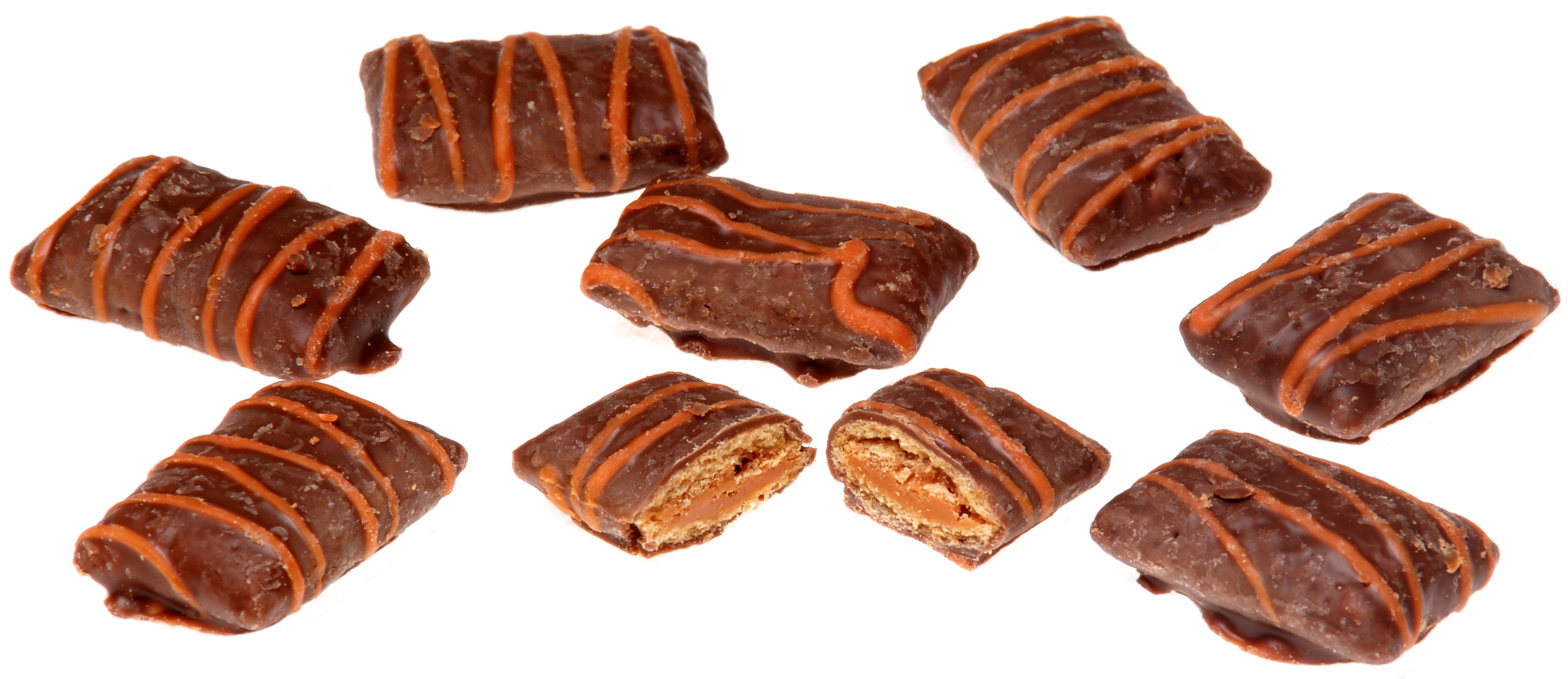
Butterfinger Snackerz (candies)

- Bites: In 2009, Butterfinger introduced Mini Bites, a product with small, bite-sized pieces of Butterfinger.
- Snackerz: Butterfinger Snackerz was another bite-sized, smooth-centered version of the candy bar.
- BB's: Starting in 1992, another form of Butterfinger bars was available named "BB's". Similar to Whoppers and Maltesers, they were roughly the size of marbles and sold in bags. They also were advertised by the Simpsons. It was discontinued in 2006 and was relaunched in 2009 as Butterfinger Bites.
- Buzz: During the height of the energy drink craze in 2009, a two-piece ‘king size’ version of the candy bar containing 80 milligrams of caffeine was released with limited distribution. The wrapper bears this warning: "Contains 80 mg per package (40 mg per piece), as much as in the leading energy drink. Not recommended for pregnant women, children or persons sensitive to caffeine." They were quickly discontinued.
- Ice Cream Bar: A product with an ice cream filling, the Butterfinger Ice Cream Bar, was introduced in 1991 and continues to be sold in individual bags to this day. Another product similar to that of Butterfinger Ice Cream Bars, but shaped in a nugget form, also was developed in 1992 and is now discontinued.
- Crisp: Nestlé also produced Butterfinger Crisp bars, which are a form of chocolate covered wafer cookie, with a Butterfinger flavored cream. This is part of a line of Nestlé products under a "crisp" name, including Nestlé Crunch Crisp and Baby Ruth Crisp.
- Cocoa Mix: Nestlé released a hot cocoa mix with the flavor of the Butterfinger bar. The packaging advertises the cocoa as having a chocolate and peanut butter taste.
- Cups: In 2014, a product similar to Reese's Peanut Butter Cups was introduced by Nestlé, the Butterfinger Peanut Butter Cup, which unlike Reese's Cups, has both crunchy and creamy peanut butter and covers the mix with milk chocolate. It was the first new Butterfinger product introduced in more than five years. Nestlé spent two years developing the product. However, they were discontinued in 2018 when the bars were sold to Ferrero SpA.
- Naked: The Naked Butterfinger is a version of the standard size candy bar that will only have a coating of chocolate on the bottom to hold it together.
- Dark: Made with Dark Chocolate. They were discontinued in 2018 when the bars were sold to Ferrero SpA.
- Bits: Crumbled Butterfinger bars, produced for consumers to bake their own Butterfinger dessert recipes.

== See also ==
- Baby Ruth
