= Coffee Crisp =

Chocolate bar made in Canada

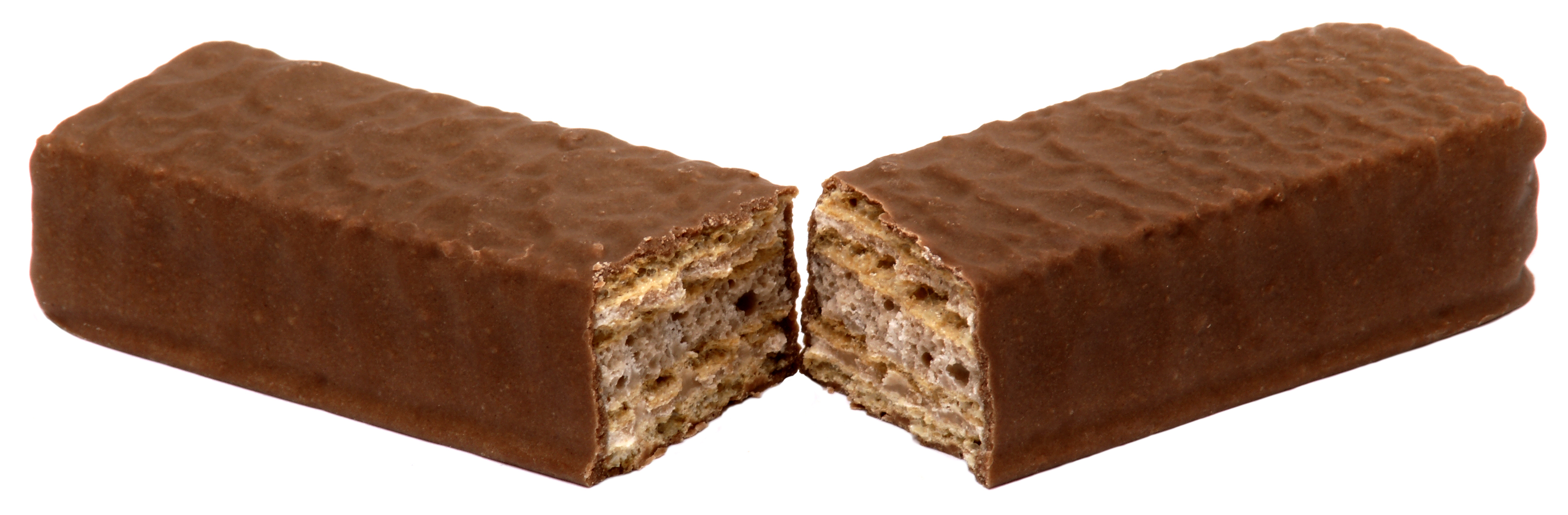
- Product type: Chocolate bar
- Current owner: Nestlé
- Country: Canada
- Introduced: 1938; 88 years ago
- Website: official website

Coffee Crisp is a chocolate bar manufactured in Canada by Nestlé. It consists of alternating layers of vanilla wafer and a foamed coffee-flavoured soft candy, covered with a milk chocolate outer layer.

== History ==
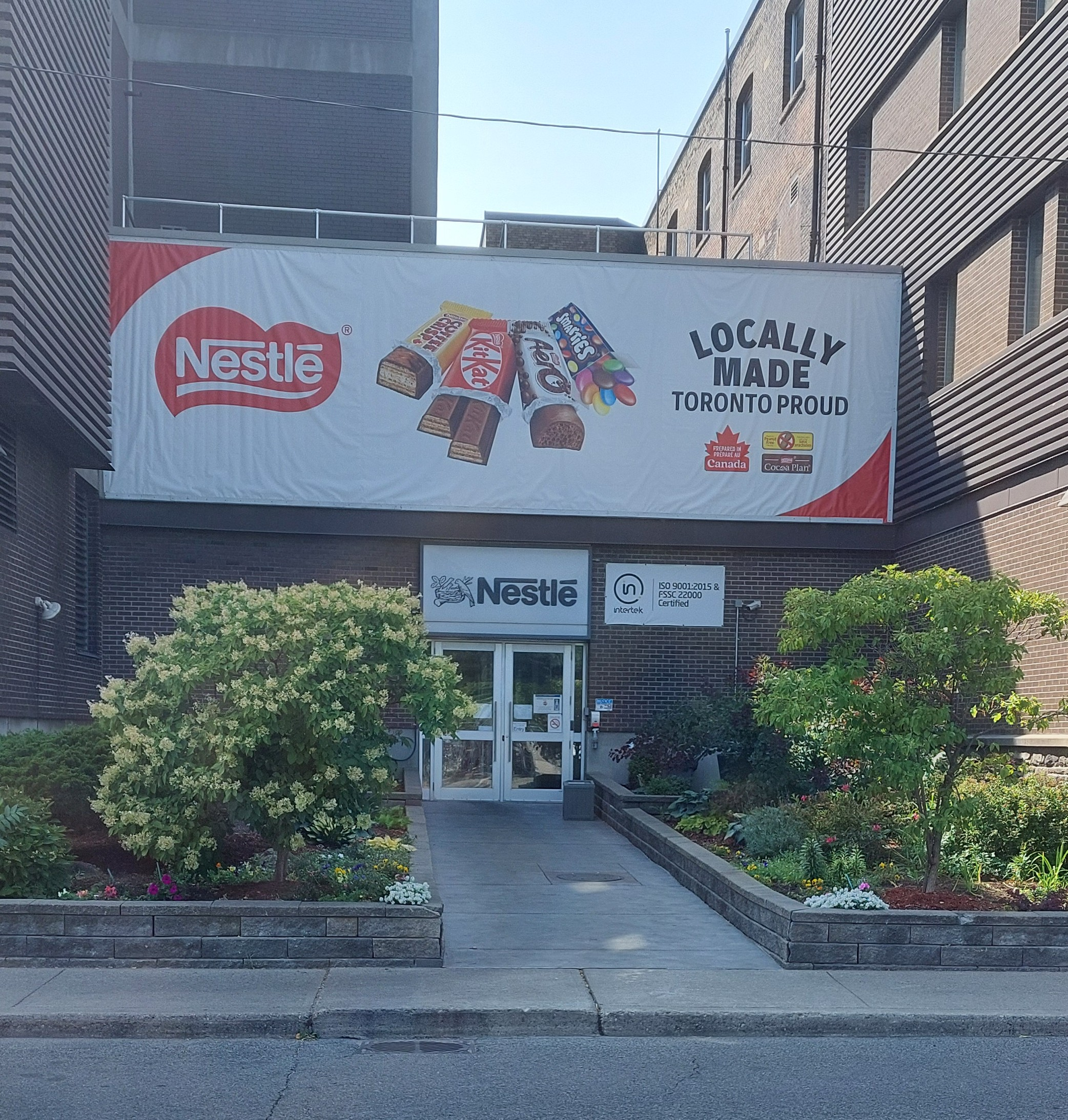
Front entrance of Nestlé chocolate factory in Toronto

William Neilson Limited developed a coffee-flavoured biscuit chocolate bar in Toronto, Canada prior to being taken over by Rowntree's. Rowntree's was already producing the "Rowntree's Wafer Crisp" in the United Kingdom, which was sold in Canada as "Biscrisp". In 1938, a coffee variation was added to the Biscrisp line, being named Coffee Crisp, incorporating the Neilson concept.

== Variations ==
In 2001, the first variation of the Coffee Crisp brand was introduced, a limited-edition "Coffee Crisp Orange" flavour. A limited amount of the orange flavour was reissued in 2002. That same year, a limited-edition "Coffee Crisp Raspberry" flavour was released. "Coffee Crisp Café Caramel" was sold in the summer of 2004 and again in the summer of 2006. A limited-edition "Coffee Crisp White" was launched in the autumn that same year. A limited-edition maple-flavoured bar was available from April to September 2005. In 2007, a dark chocolate version was introduced.

== Availability outside Canada ==
In 2006, a petition was started at coffeecrisp.org, a website unaffiliated with the company, asking Nestlé to market the Coffee Crisp in all U.S. cities. According to the site, the petition succeeded and Nestlé began marketing the Coffee Crisp nationwide in late July 2006.

== See also ==
- Crisp (chocolate bar)— different "Crisp" candy bars by Nestlé, sold in the United States
- Canadian cuisine
- List of Canadian inventions and discoveries
- List of chocolate bar brands
