= Deathwatch (novel) =

1972 novel by Robb White

- Cover showing the Mojave Desert, Ben's Jeep CJ, and Madec's rifle.
- Author: Robb White
- Illustrator: John Mantha
- Cover artist: John Mantha
- Language: English
- Genre: Thriller/Action Adventurous
- Publisher: Doubleday
- Publication date: 1972
- Publication place: United States
- Media type: Print
- Pages: 220 pp.
- ISBN: 0440917409
- OCLC: 9352863

Deathwatch is an American 1972 novel written by Robb White. The book was awarded the 1973 Edgar Award for Best Juvenile Mystery from the Mystery Writers of America, and was an Outstanding Book of the Year by The New York Times.

Its plot features a skilled and successful hunter and lawyer, Madec, who receives a rare permit to shoot bighorn sheep in California's Mojave Desert for seven days. He hires a timid college student named Ben as a guide. After Madec accidentally shoots an old prospector, he realizes that Ben will not help cover up the shooting, and he attempts to silence Ben forever.

== Plot ==
The story begins with successful Los Angeles businessman and hunter named Madec, who hires Ben, a college student, to help him find bighorn sheep in the nearby Mojave Desert after receiving a rare permit to hunt them. Ben has experience working in the desert, as he is studying to be a geologist, but he is also low on money, so he accepts.

Things take a deadly turn when Madec accidentally shoots an old prospector. Madec does not want to report the shooting, but Ben insists that they must. Madec threatens Ben with his rifle, and orders Ben strip down to his shorts, then leaves him in the desert to die of exposure, planning to report that Ben went insane, shot the prospector, and wandered off into the desert alone. Madec is certain Ben cannot survive, as they are in a hot desert 45 miles from the nearest highway, but just to make sure, he watches Ben from a distance, using the scope on his rifle. Ben is shot at multiple times as Madec tries to dissuade Ben from searching for water with one shot going through Ben's arm. Time is running out as he begins to hallucinate, suffering from dehydration, hunger, sunburn, gunshots, and heat. However, Ben finds enough water to survive, and also finds a wrist-brace slingshot and some buckshot that had belonged to the prospector. He practices with the slingshot, then uses it to overcome and capture Madec.

When they return to town, Ben's story is not believed, especially as he has no physical evidence to back it up. Madec's claim that Ben shot the prospector and tried to frame Madec is regarded as more credible. Ben is saved from facing false charges when the town's doctor offers forensic evidence that Ben's version of the story is true and that Madec's was a lie.

== Adaptations ==
The book was the basis for the 1974 television film Savages, starring Andy Griffith as Madec and Sam Bottoms as Ben, and the 2014 film Beyond the Reach, starring Michael Douglas as Madec and Jeremy Irvine as Ben.
