= Colonial Records =

American record label

- Founded: 1948
- Founder: Orville Campbell
- Distributor(s): ABC-Paramount Records, London Records, Tollie Records
- Genre: Various
- Country of origin: US

Colonial Records was a Chapel Hill, North Carolina–based record label that provided the springboard for artists Andy Griffith, George Hamilton IV, John D. Loudermilk, and Billy "Crash" Craddock.

== Origin ==
Colonial Records was a record label founded in 1948 by Orville Campbell, a journalist and newspaper publisher in Chapel Hill, North Carolina. Its first release was "All The Way Choo Choo," by the Bell Tones, which Campbell composed with partner Hank Beebe in 1949, about UNC football star Charlie Justice. A recording of the song by bandleader Johnny Long was released on King Records and sold well regionally. Benny Goodman recorded the song for Capitol Records but it was not released.

Colonial's second release was another Campbell-Beebe composition, “Way Up In North Carolina,” also performed by the Bell Tones. The record caught the attention of bandleader Fred Waring, who performed it on his musical variety television program in 1951.

== "What It Was, Was Football" ==
In the fall of 1953, a young monologist named Andy Griffith recorded a routine in the role of a naïve country preacher who describes his experience attending a college football game, which is entirely puzzling to him. He sent the recording to Colonial Records. “What It Was, Was Football” became the label's third release in November that year. Colonial sold nearly 50,000 copies regionally. Capitol Records publicity man Richard Linke heard the record on a distant radio station and flew from New York City to North Carolina to buy the masters. The record became a huge success in the comedy record market, selling some 800,000 copies, and reaching number 9 on the pop music charts.

== "A Rose and a Baby Ruth" ==
In 1956, a young aspiring musician named George Hamilton IV approached Colonial Records to pursue a recording career. That August Campbell recorded his rendition of a tune by fellow North Carolina artist John D. Loudermilk, “A Rose and a Baby Ruth.” ABC-Paramount Records acquired the masters and the record became a smash hit. On the popular music charts, the disk topped out at number 6, selling close to a million copies.

== "Sittin’ in the Balcony" ==
In February 1957, Campbell recorded Loudermilk singing one of his own tunes, “Sittin' in the Balcony,” released under the name of “Johnny Dee.” It rose to number 38 on the charts, but became a springboard for Eddie Cochran, whose cover version reached number 18.

== Other recordings ==
Colonial Records' artist roster included Jay Hanna “Dizzy” Dean, who became a television sports commentator following his career as a Major League Baseball pitcher, and Bill Craddock, who went on to country music fame as Billy “Crash” Craddock. An album of Craddock's early recordings between 1958 and 1961 was released in 1986 as Crash's Greatest Hits. Although it is labeled as a Colonial disc, it is a Canadian pressing and is said to be an unofficial release.

Doug Franklin and the Bluenotes’ recording of "Lucky Love" placed in the Hot 100 at No. 73 in 1958. "Ski King" by E.C. Beatty sold 140,000 copies within the first two weeks after its release in 1959. It spent six weeks on the Hot 100 peaking at No. 50 on October 12, 1959.

== Distribution ==
Colonial's records were distributed by ABC-Paramount Records from 1956 to 1959. London Records signed a three-year distribution agreement in May of that year. Tollie Records became the label's final distributor toward the end of Colonial's existence.

== Selected singles ==
- Allan and the Flames
  - Till The End of Time/Winter Wonderland (1960)
- Cecelia Batten
  - My Big Brothers Friend/Before (1957)
  - Knock On The Pipes/Lonesome Train (1957)
- E.C. Beatty
  - I'm A Lucky Man/Ski King (1959)
  - Let Her Go Daddy-O/Ugh! Ugh! Ugh! (1960)
  - Little Blue Eyes/Tarzan (1960)
- The Bluenotes
  - Mighty Low/Page One (1957)
  - You're A Tiger/Let Her Know (1958)
  - Never Never Land/I Waited (1958)
- Bill Craddock
  - Birddoggin'/Millionaire (1957)
- Johnny Dee
  - Sittin' in the Balcony/A-Plus In Love (1957)
  - It's Gotta Be You/Teenage Queen (1957)
  - In My Simple Way/1000 Concrete Blocks (1957)
  - They Were Right/Somebody Sweet (1957)
- Dizzy Dean
  - Wabash Cannon Ball/You Don't Have to Be From the Country (1954)
- Jess Duboy
  - Puppy Love/Echos (1959)
- Johnny Ford
  - I'm Gonna Keep On Loving You/That's My Desire (1965)
- Four Sounds and A Fury
  - Virginia Beach Reel/Myrtle Beach Boogie (1956?)
- Doug Franklin
  - My Lucky Love/Drizzlin' Rain (1958)
  - I Wonder Who's Kissing Her Now/I Used To Wonder (1958)
  - The New Midnight Special/My Love For You (1958)
- Franklin Brothers
  - So Real/My Little Girl (1959)
  - Wake Up (Little Boy Blue)/Day Dreaming (1959)
- The Goldtones
  - High Dive Into Love/The Oriental Shake (1965)
- Deacon Andy Griffith
  - What It Was, Was Football/Romeo And Juliet (1953)
- George Hamilton IV
  - If You Don't Know/A Rose and a Baby Ruth (1956)
  - I've Got a Secret/Sam (1956)
- Hank Hardy
  - My Lucky Love/1000 Concrete Blocks (1961)
- Doug Harrell
  - Hospitality Blues/Exsanguination Blues (1956)
- Grady Lewis
  - Runaway Lover/Sad Story (1960)
- Melody Masters Quartet
  - It's Gotta Be All/Singing On The Mountain (1957)
- Tom O'Neil
  - Georgia On My Mind/Who's Sorry Now (1961)
  - Song For Anita/I Get The Blues When It Rains (1961)
- Johnny Randal
  - Do Right/You're Gone But Still In My Heart (1964)
  - How About That/This Is The End (1964) (as Johnny Randall)
  - Sweet As Honey/Dreamin' On A Sunday Afternoon (1965)
- Hoke Simpson
  - Mountain Dew Rock/Number One (1957)
- Ebe Sneezer and His Epidemics
  - That's All I've Got (To Remember You By) /Asiatic Flu (1957)
- ’Cile Turner
  - Drizzlin' Rain/Full Of The Moon (CR 731 - with picture sleeve) (1957)
  - Crap Shootin' Sinner/The Golden Rule (1959)
  - Going Down To Town/Don't Fool Around With The Blues (1960)
  - Joe Sweeny/In Virginia (1960)
  - The Happy Song/The Winds Call It Home (1961)
  - I'm Walking That Lonesome Road/Going Down To Town (1977)
- Henry Wilson
  - Are You Ready/It's Really Love (1958)

== Labels associated with Colonial Records ==
- ABC-Paramount Records
- London Records

== See also ==
- List of record labels
