= Curtiss Candy Company =

American confectionery company

- Type: Subsidiary
- Industry: Confectionery
- Founded: 1916; 110 years ago
- Founder: Otto Schnering
- Defunct: 1964; 62 years ago (as a company); 1990; 36 years ago (as a brand)
- Fate: Purchased by Standard Brands in 1964, which was merged with Nabisco to form Nabisco Brands in 1981, which was merged with R. J. Reynolds Tobacco Company to form RJR Nabisco in 1985, and which later sold to Nestlé in 1990
- Successor: List: Standard Brands (1929-81); Nabisco Brands (1981-85); RJR Nabisco (1985-90); Nestlé (1990-)
- Headquarters: Chicago, Illinois
- Products: Sweets
- Subsidiaries: Nestlé

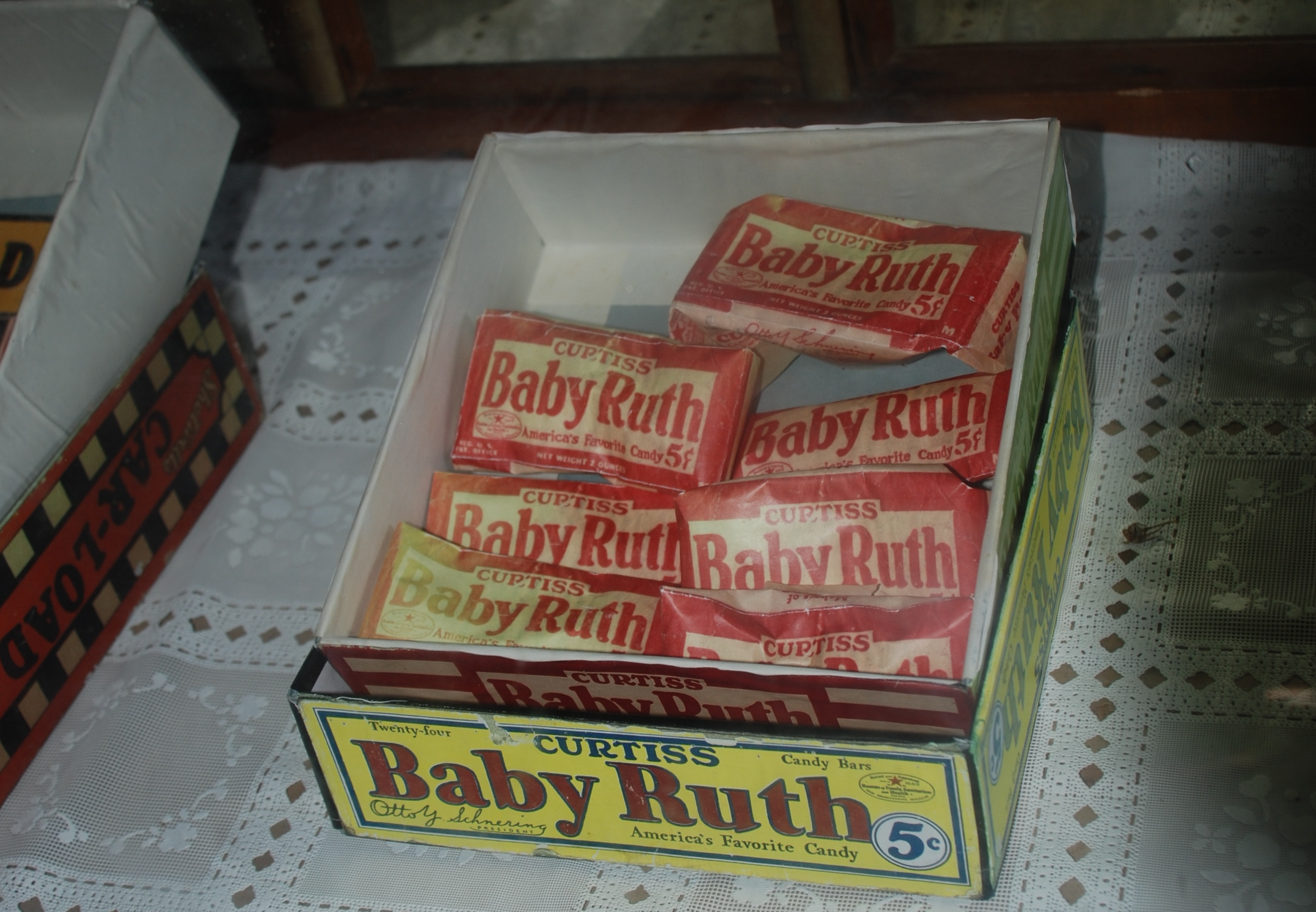
Box of Curtiss' Baby Ruth candy bars at a general store in Portsmouth, North Carolina

The Curtiss Candy Company was an American confectionery brand and a former company based in Chicago, Illinois. It was founded in 1916 by Otto Schnering near Chicago, Illinois. Wanting a more "American-sounding" name (due to anti-German sentiment during World War I), Schnering named his company using his mother's maiden name.

Their first confectionery item was Kandy Kake, later refashioned in 1920 as the log-shaped Baby Ruth. Their second confectionery item was the chocolate-covered peanut butter crunch Butterfinger, which was introduced in 1926. In 1931, Curtiss marketed the brand by sponsoring famous air racer, John H. Livingston, in the Baby Ruth Aerobatic Team flying the air-racer Howard "Mike" at airshows, and sponsoring Livingston's Monocoupe racer in the 1934 MacRobertson Air Race. The Jolly Jack candy was included in army rations during World War II.

In 1964, Standard Brands purchased Curtiss Candy Company. Standard Brands merged with Nabisco in 1981. In 1990, RJR Nabisco sold the Curtiss brands to Nestlé.

The Baby Ruth / Butterfinger factory, built in the 1960s, is located at 3401 Mt. Prospect Rd. in Franklin Park, Illinois. Interstate 294 curves eastward around the plant, where a prominent, rotating sign, resembling a giant candy bar, is visible. It originally read "Curtiss Baby Ruth" on one side and "Curtiss Butterfinger" on the other. It was changed to read "Nestlé" following the acquisition.

A "Curtiss Baby Ruth" sign was on an apartment building across from Wrigley Field for several decades. Wrigley and the Curtiss plant are both on Addison Street, although more than 10 miles apart.

== Curtiss products over the years ==
In the early decades, Curtiss had a wide variety of candies aside from Baby Ruth and Butterfinger.

=== Candies ===
- Baby Ruth suckers
- Baby Ruth (1921–1981)
- Butterfinger (1923–1964)
- Better Creams
- Curtiss Butterscotch
- Buy Golly
- Buy Jiminy
- Caramel Nougat
- Caramel Smackers
- Cherry Pattie
- Chocolate Almond Nougat
- Chocolate Dipper Mallows
- Chocolate Dipped Nut Butter Pillows
- Chocolate suckers
- Coconut Grove
- Curtiss Nut Roll
- Dip
- Easy Aces
- Foxxy
- Gypsy
- Jolly Jack
- Kandy Kake
- Koko Nut Roll
- Man-O-War
- Milk Nut Loaf
- Moon Spoon
- Nickaloaf
- Penny Log
- Peppermint Patty
- Royal Marshmallows
- Safe-T-Pops
- Taffee Giraffee
- Topper
- Wild Cherry suckers

=== Bite-sized candies ===
- Butterfinger Chips
- Caramel Nougats
- Coconut Niblets
- Dip-Bits*
- Milk Caramels
- Mint Patties
- Nuggets

=== Drop and mint flavors ===
- Assorted Fruit
- Butterscotch
- Chocolate
- Grape
- Lemon
- Lime
- Orange
- Peppermint
- Root Beer
- Spearmint
- Wild Cherry
- Wintergreen

=== Gum flavors ===
- Baby Ruth Peppermint
- Baby Ruth Fruit flavored
- Bubble Chum
- Hawaiian Fruit
- Peppermint
- Pepsin
- Spearmint

=== Miracle-Aid flavors ===
(This was a competitor to Kool-Aid)

- Cherry
- Grape
- Lemon Lime
- Orange
- Raspberry
- Strawberry
