= Andy Griffith =

American actor and singer (1926–2012)

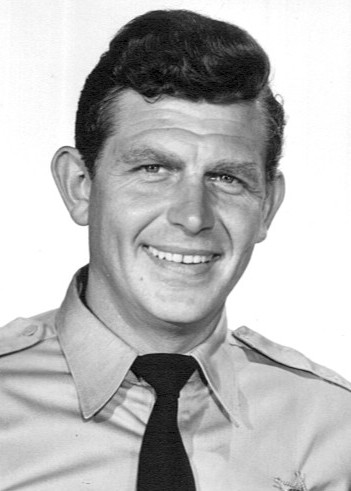
- Griffith in 1960, The Andy Griffith Show
- Born: Andy Samuel Griffith; June 1, 1926; Mount Airy, North Carolina, U.S.
- Died: July 3, 2012 (aged 86); Manteo, North Carolina, U.S.
- Resting place: Roanoke Island, North Carolina, U.S.
- Education: University of North Carolina at Chapel Hill (BMus)
- Occupations: Actor; comedian; producer; singer; writer; director
- Years active: 1946–2010
- Notable work: The Andy Griffith Show; Matlock
- Political party: Democratic
- Spouses: Barbara Bray Edwards (m. 1949; div. 1972) Solica Cassuto (m. 1973; div. 1981) Cindi Knight (m. 1983)
- Children: 2

Andy Samuel Griffith (June 1, 1926 – July 3, 2012) was an American actor, comedian, television producer, singer, and writer whose career spanned more than six decades. Known for his Southern drawl, Griffith received two Tony Award nominations for his Broadway performances in No Time for Sergeants (1956) and Destry Rides Again (1960). He made his film debut in Elia Kazan's A Face in the Crowd (1957), a role that helped establish his Hollywood career. He became best known for portraying the Sheriff Andy Taylor in the sitcom The Andy Griffith Show (1960–1968) and defense attorney Ben Matlock in the legal drama Matlock (1986–1995). Griffith appeared on Broadway in No Time for Sergeants (1955) and Destry Rides Again (1959–1960), earning Tony nominations for both roles.

== Early life and education ==
Griffith was born on June 1, 1926, in Mount Airy, North Carolina, the only child of Carl Lee Griffith and his wife, Geneva (née Nunn). During his early childhood, Griffith lived with his maternal grandmother while his parents sought work in Ohio. His family could not initially afford a crib or a bed, and he reportedly slept in dresser drawers during infancy. In 1932, Griffith's parents purchased a home in Mount Airy's "blue-collar" south side, where his father worked as a carpenter. By the time he entered school, he faced ridicule because of his family's poverty. He was a shy student, but once he found a way to make his peers laugh, he began to come out of his shell.

As a student at Mount Airy High School, Griffith developed an interest in acting and participated in school plays. As a teenager, he developed an interest in swing music. Griffith was raised Baptist and was taught to sing and play the trombone by Edward Mickey, a minister at Grace Moravian Church, who led the brass band. Griffith graduated from high school in 1944.

He attended the University of North Carolina (UNC) in Chapel Hill, North Carolina, and graduated with a Bachelor of Arts degree in music in 1949. He began college intending to become a Moravian minister, but changed his major to music and joined the Carolina Playmakers. While attending university, Griffith began performing in The Lost Colony in 1946, a play by Paul Green about the failed 16th-century attempt to establish an English colony on North Carolina's Roanoke Island. He continued performing in the production for seven summers, eventually taking on the role of Sir Walter Raleigh.

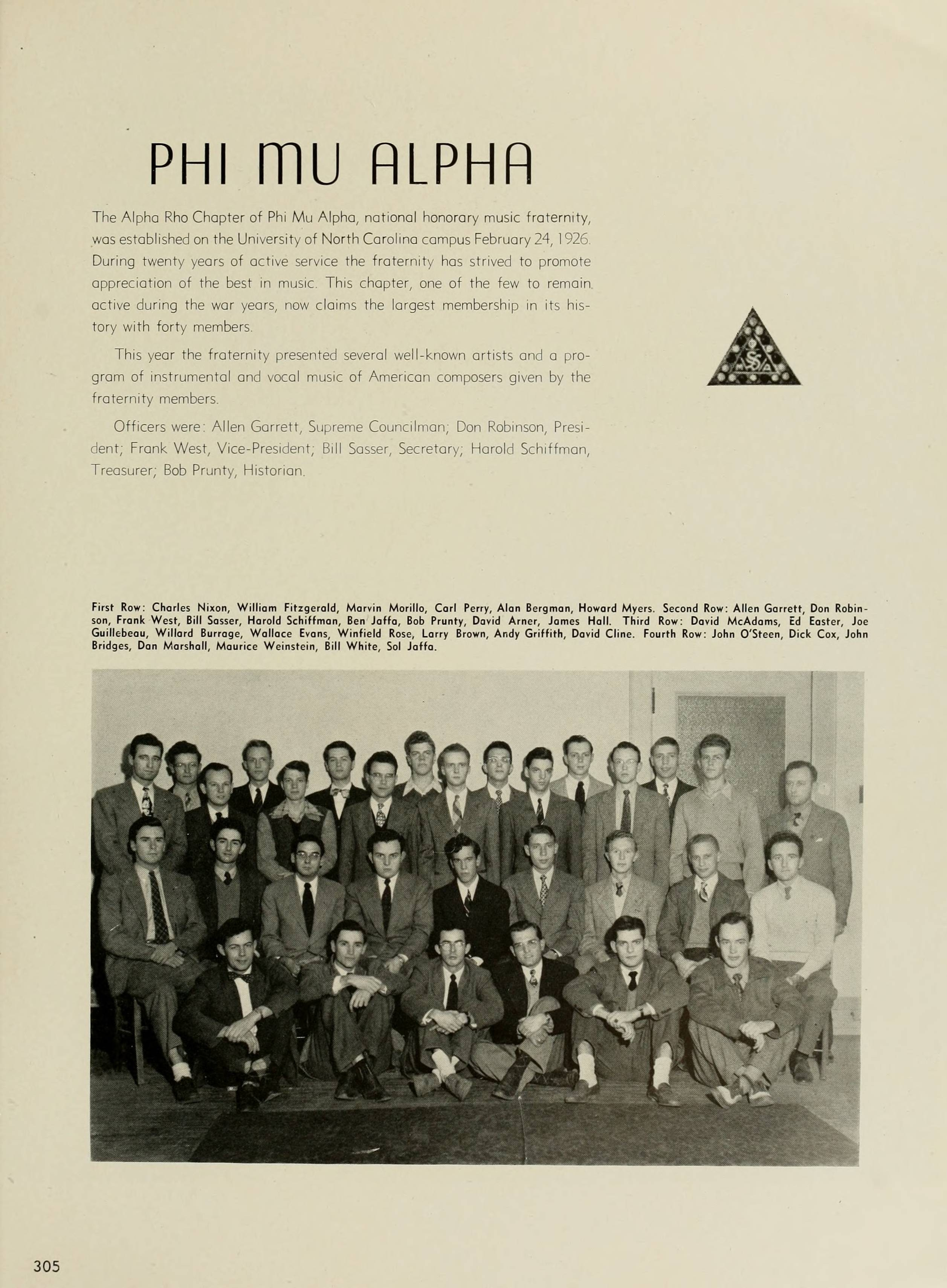
Griffith (standing, second from right) with fellow Phi Mu Alpha fraternity members at the University of North Carolina, 1947

At UNC, Griffith was a member of the Phi Mu Alpha Sinfonia music fraternity's Alpha Rho chapter. He also played roles in several student operettas, including The Chimes of Normandy (1946), and Gilbert and Sullivan's The Gondoliers (1945), The Mikado (1948) and H.M.S. Pinafore (1949). After graduation, he taught music and served as an assistant drama coach for several years at Goldsboro High School in Goldsboro, North Carolina, where his students included future radio broadcaster Carl Kasell.

== Career ==
=== Early career and breakthrough (1953–1959) ===
Griffith's early career was as a monologist. Assuming the character of an affable country parson, "Deacon Andy Griffith" delivered comic monologues such as "What It Was, Was Football", in which he described a football game from the perspective of someone unfamiliar with the sport. The monologue was released as a single in 1953 on the Colonial Records label. Capitol Records acquired the master recording and reissued the record in December 1953. It became a hit, reaching number nine on Billboard's Best Sellers in Stores chart in 1954. The B-side of the original Colonial single featured the deacon explaining Shakespeare's Romeo and Juliet in the same rural dialect. Griffith made appearances on television variety shows, including The Ed Sullivan Show in 1954, where he performed his comic monologues.

Griffith with Lee Remick (l) and Patricia Neal (r) on the set of A Face in the Crowd (1957)

Griffith made his television acting debut in March 1955 as Will Stockdale, a country boy drafted into the United States Air Force, in Ira Levin's television adaptation of No Time for Sergeants, broadcast on the anthology series The United States Steel Hour. He later made a second appearance on the series in Never Know the End (1958). Griffith reprised the role in Ira Levin's full-length stage adaptation of the same name, which opened on Broadway on October 20, 1955. The role earned him a Tony Award nomination for "Distinguished Supporting or Featured Dramatic Actor" at the 1956 Tony Awards, losing to Ed Begley. He also received the 1956 Theatre World Award for his Broadway debut in No Time for Sergeants. Griffith's performance also received positive reviews, including praise from theatre critic Brooks Atkinson of The New York Times.

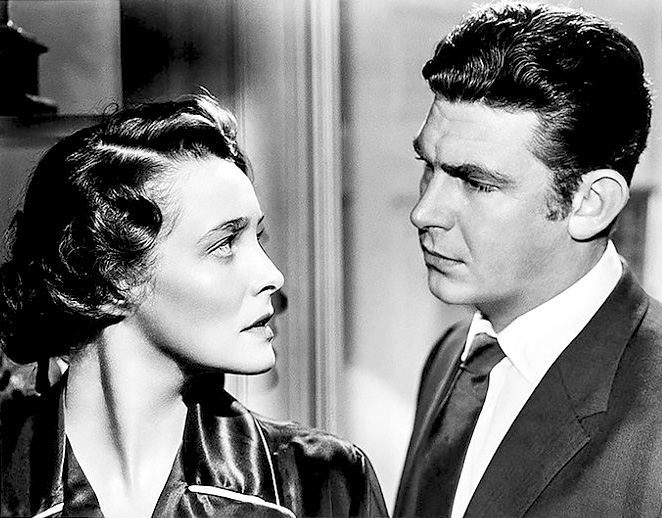
Patricia Neal and Griffith in A Face in the Crowd (1957)

In 1957, Griffith made his feature-film debut starring in A Face in the Crowd. He portrayed Larry "Lonesome" Rhodes, a manipulative and power-hungry drifter who becomes a television personality and gains political influence. The film was directed by Elia Kazan, written by Budd Schulberg and co-starred Patricia Neal, Walter Matthau, Tony Franciosa, and Lee Remick (in her film debut). Griffith also sang as part of his role in A Face in the Crowd. Griffith reprised his role as Will Stockdale in Warner Bros.' 1958 film adaptation of No Time for Sergeants, alongside Don Knotts, who also appeared in the Broadway production. The film influenced the later television sitcom Gomer Pyle, U.S.M.C., a spin-off of The Andy Griffith Show. Following the success of No Time for Sergeants, Warner Bros. cast Griffith in another military comedy, Onionhead (1958), in which he portrayed a US Coast Guard sailor.

Griffith's only other Broadway appearance was in the title role of the 1959 musical Destry Rides Again, co-starring Dolores Gray. The show, with a score by Harold Rome, ran for 472 performances between April 1959 and June 1960. Griffith was nominated for the Tony Award for Best Actor in a Musical at the 1960 Tony Awards, losing to Jackie Gleason.

=== The Andy Griffith Show (1960–1968) ===
In February 1960, Griffith appeared as Sheriff Andy Taylor in an episode of Make Room for Daddy starring Danny Thomas. The episode, titled "Danny Meets Andy Griffith", featured Thomas's character being stopped for running a stop sign in Mayberry and served as a backdoor pilot for The Andy Griffith Show. Both shows were produced by Sheldon Leonard.

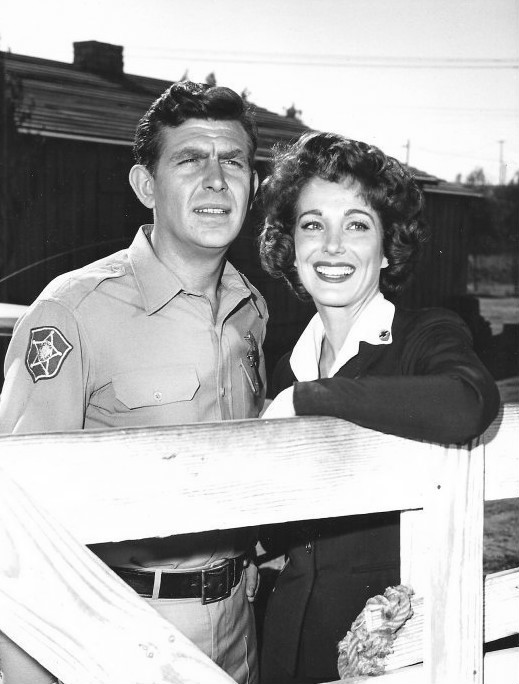
Andy Griffith and Julie Adams in 1962

Following the backdoor pilot, Griffith began starring as Sheriff Andy Taylor in The Andy Griffith Show, which premiered on CBS on October 3, 1960. Set in the fictional town of Mayberry, North Carolina, the series followed Taylor, a widowed sheriff and town sage. The show was filmed at Desilu Studios, with exteriors filmed at Forty Acres in Culver City, California. From 1960 to 1965, the show co-starred Griffith's longtime friend Don Knotts as Deputy Barney Fife, Taylor's best friend and comedy partner. The show also starred child actor Ron Howard (then known as Ronny Howard), who played Taylor's son, Opie Taylor. Griffith never received a writing credit for the show, but contributed to the development of its scripts. Knotts won five Primetime Emmy Awards, while Frances Bavier won one in 1967. Griffith was never nominated for an Emmy Award during the show's run. Griffith sang in several episodes of The Andy Griffith Show, and during the show's run, he also recorded country and gospel music, including a vocal version of the show's theme song titled "The Fishin' Hole".

In 1967, Griffith announced that he would leave The Andy Griffith Show after its eighth season to pursue a movie career and other projects. During the final season of the show, Ken Berry was introduced as widowed farmer Sam Jones, whose character gradually became the focus of the series in preparation for Griffith's departure. The series was succeeded by Mayberry R.F.D., which premiered on CBS on September 23, 1968, with Berry in the lead role and several cast members from The Andy Griffith Show returning. Griffith served as executive producer, reviewing scripts and providing input on a weekly basis. He also made guest appearances as Andy Taylor, including in the premiere episode, in which Taylor married Helen Crump. Griffith reprised his role alongside Knotts in the 1986 television film, Return to Mayberry, and also in the spin off series Gomer Pyle, U.S.M.C., including the 1966 episode "Opie Joins the Marines". He later participated in reunion specials for The Andy Griffith Show in 1993 and 2003, the latter attracting more than 21 million viewers.

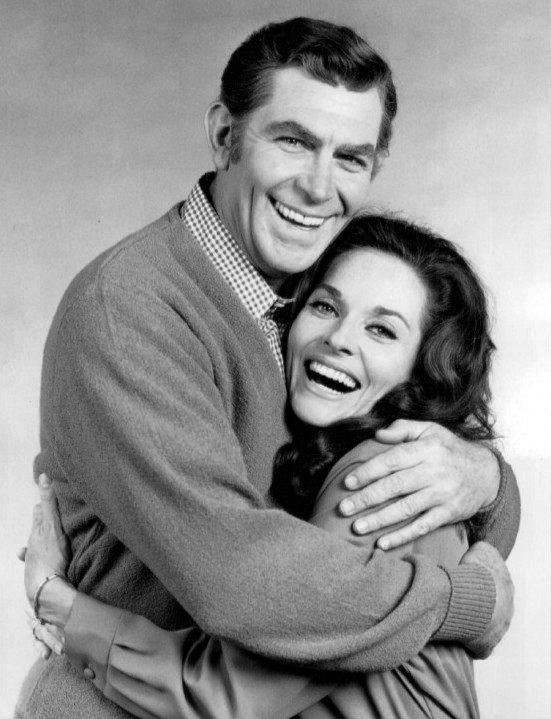
Publicity photo with Lee Meriwether for The New Andy Griffith Show, 1971

=== Other television series and films (1969–1985) ===
Griffith starred in less-successful television series such as Headmaster (1970), The New Andy Griffith Show (1971), Adams of Eagle Lake (1975), Salvage 1 (1979) and The Yeagers (1980). In 1972, he established his own production company Andy Griffith Enterprises. That year, he also guest-starred as George Carter in The Mod Squad episode "Big George". Alongside his television series work, Griffith appeared in several television films, including The Strangers in 7A (1972), Go Ask Alice (1973), Winter Kill (1974) and Pray for the Wildcats (1974). Griffith also played the villainous lawyer Horton Maddock in the television film Savages (1974), an adaptation of Robb White's 1972 novel Deathwatch.

In 1975, Griffith appeared alongside Jeff Bridges in the comedy film Hearts of the West, portraying Howard Pike, a former Western film star. Several of Griffith's television films during the 1970s were produced as pilots for proposed television series. The television film Winter Kill (1974) was developed as a series pilot and later reworked into Adams of Eagle Lake, which aired only two episodes in 1975. A year later, Griffith starred as prosecutor Gus Brenner in the television film Street Killing, and also played the Father in a television adaptation of Luigi Pirandello's Six Characters in Search of an Author, directed by Stacy Keach.

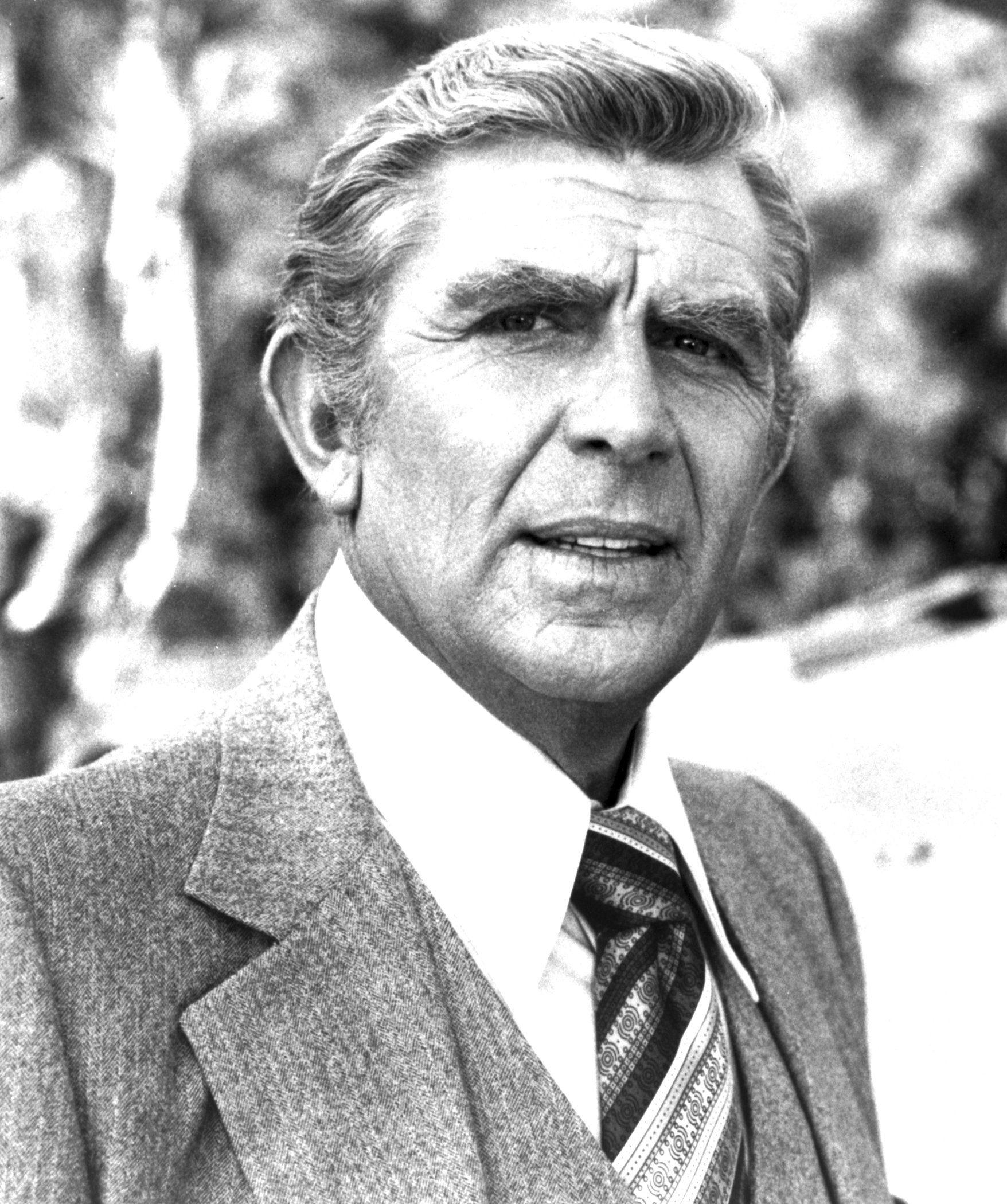
Andy Griffith in 1984

In 1977, Griffith portrayed Police Chief Abel Marsh in two NBC television films, The Girl in the Empty Grave and Deadly Game, both intended as pilots for a proposed television series. Neither resulted in a series. He also appeared in several television miniseries, including Washington: Behind Closed Doors (1977), Centennial (1978–1979), Roots: The Next Generations (1979) and From Here to Eternity (1979). In Washington: Behind Closed Doors, he portrayed former president Esker Scott Anderson. Griffith also made guest appearances in, Hawaii Five-O (1972), Here's Lucy (1973) and The Bionic Woman (1976). Griffith continued to make guest appearances in television series, including Fantasy Island, in which he portrayed the historical figure Judge Roy Bean. He also appeared in episodes of Hotel and The Love Boat, which featured an appearance by Andy Warhol, who appeared as himself.

Griffith received his only Primetime Emmy Award nomination in 1981 for Outstanding Supporting Actor in a Limited Series or Special, for his role as the father of a murder victim in the television film Murder in Texas (1981). He received further praise for his portrayal of the murderous landowner John Wallace in Murder in Coweta County (1983), which co-starred Johnny Cash as Sheriff Lamar Potts. He also portrayed Justice Department attorney Victor Worheide in the NBC miniseries Fatal Vision (1984). In the Western comedy Rustlers' Rhapsody (1985), Griffith appeared alongside Tom Berenger as Colonel Ticonderoga, a wealthy cattle rancher and antagonist. He went on to portray Judge Julius Sullivan in the television film Crime of Innocence (1985), who sentences two teenage girls to jail for a minor offense.

=== Matlock and later appearances (1986–2009) ===
In 1986, Griffith returned to series television in the title role of Ben Matlock, an Atlanta-based criminal defense attorney, in the legal drama Matlock (1986–1995), which aired on NBC until 1992 and subsequently on ABC. Matlock was known for his Southern drawl and mannerisms and ability to win cases. Griffith also sang in several episodes of the series. The series also starred Nancy Stafford as attorney Michelle Thomas (1987–1992) and Clarence Gilyard Jr. as private investigator Conrad McMasters (1989–1993). During its first season (1986–1987) Matlock ranked 15th among American prime-time television programs in the Nielsen ratings, and the series received four Primetime Emmy Award nominations, winning one, although Griffith was never nominated for his performance. He won a People's Choice Award in 1987 for Favorite Male Performer in a New Television Program.

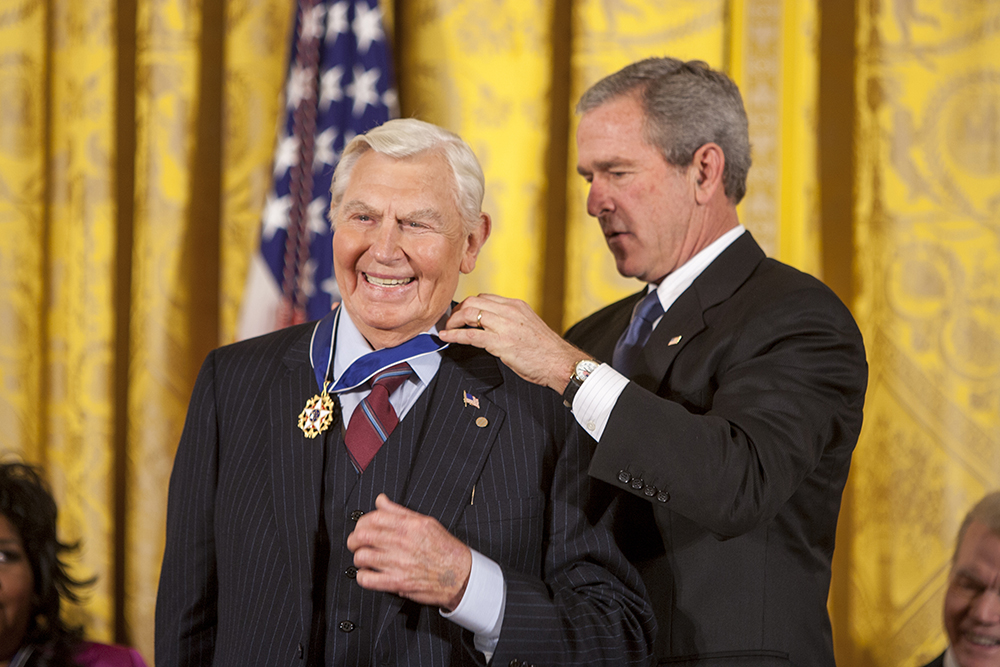
Griffith receiving the Presidential Medal of Freedom from president George W. Bush (2005)

Griffith played an alcoholic father, Noah Talbot, in the television film Under the Influence (1986). He later starred alongside John Ritter in Gramps (1995), playing Jack MacGruder, a violent and manipulative grandfather who returns to his estranged son's life. He also played the villain General Rancor in the spy comedy-spoof Spy Hard (1996) starring Leslie Nielsen. During this period, Griffith recorded albums of classic Christian hymns for Sparrow Records. His 1996 album, I Love to Tell the Story: 25 Timeless Hymns, was certified platinum by the RIAA,and won the Grammy Award for Best Southern, Country or Bluegrass Gospel Album at the 1997 Grammy Awards. Griffith also reprised his role as Ben Matlock in a two-part episode of Diagnosis: Murder in 1997. He later played Jake Peterson in the television film A Holiday Romance (1999) and the patriarch of a dysfunctional southern family in Daddy and Them (2001). Griffith's final guest-starring role was in the Dawson's Creek episode "A Winter's Tale" (2001).

In the feature film Waitress (2007), Griffith played Old Joe, the cantankerous owner of a diner where Keri Russell's character, Jenna, worked. Griffith appeared in country singer Brad Paisley's music video "Waitin' on a Woman" (2008). His last film appearance was the leading role in the independent romantic comedy Play the Game (2009), in which he played Grandpa Joe, a widower whose grandson encourages him to re-enter the dating world after a 60-year hiatus.

== Personal life ==
Griffith married Barbara Bray Edwards on August 22, 1949, and they adopted two children: a son, Andrew Samuel Griffith Jr. (known as Sam), and a daughter Dixie Nan Griffith. They divorced in 1972. Griffith was married to his second wife, Greek actress Solica Cassuto, from 1973 to 1981. Griffith married actress Cindi Knight in 1983, and they remained married until his death in 2012. Griffith had three granddaughters through his daughter, Dixie. According to Daniel de Visé's 2015 biography Andy & Don: The Making of a Friendship and a Classic American TV Show, Griffith had an affair with actress Aneta Corsaut while they worked together on The Andy Griffith Show.

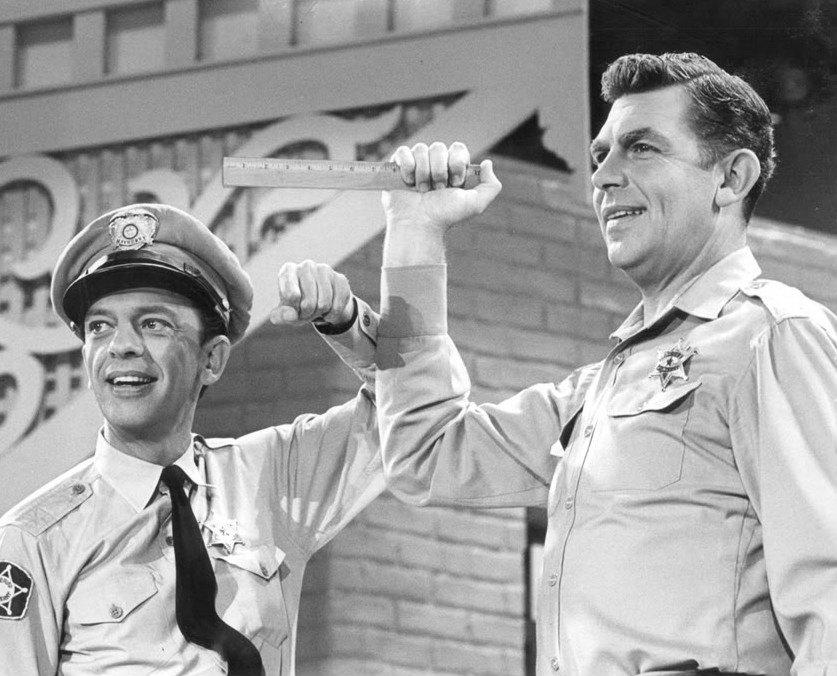
Don Knotts (L) and Andy Griffith (R) on the set of The Andy Griffith-Don Knotts-Jim Nabors Hour (1965)

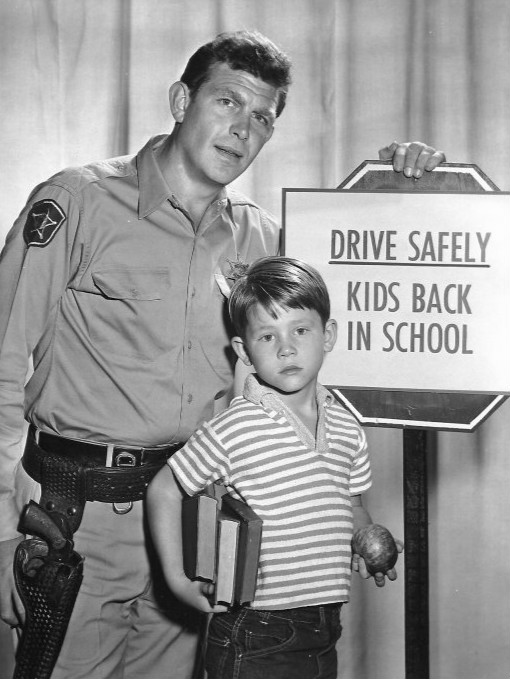
Griffith & Howard in a 1961 publicity photo for The Andy Griffith Show

=== Friendships and professional relationships ===
Griffith's friendship with Don Knotts began in 1955 when they co-starred in the Broadway production of No Time for Sergeants. They later reunited on Matlock in 1988, when Knotts joined the series in a recurring role. In a January 2000 interview, Griffith said of Knotts, "The five years we worked together were the best five years of my life". They remained friends until Knotts's death in February 2006. Shortly before his death, Griffith traveled from his Manteo, North Carolina, home to visit Knotts at Cedars-Sinai Medical Center in Los Angeles.

Griffith and Ron Howard maintained a friendship after working together on The Andy Griffith Show. Griffith made a comedy cameo in an episode of Saturday Night Live on October 9, 1982, hosted by Howard, who had begun his directing career by that time. Following Griffith's death in 2012, Howard recalled the positive atmosphere he had created on the set of The Andy Griffith Show, describing him as a major influence on his career. In a 2016 interview with Us Weekly, Howard recalled Griffith encouraging his scriptwriting when he was seven years old. After one of Howard's suggestions was accepted, Griffith jokingly told him, "It's the first that was any damn good. Now let's rehearse!"

=== Political activities ===
In 1989, Griffith declined an invitation from Democratic Party officials to run against Republican senator Jesse Helms in North Carolina. In 2000, Griffith appeared in campaign advertisements endorsing Democratic Party candidate and then-North Carolina Attorney General Mike Easley for governor of North Carolina. Easley defeated former Charlotte mayor Richard Vinroot, receiving 52% of the vote to Vinroot's 46%. Griffith's endorsement was credited by some commentators with helping Easley's campaign, contributing to the election's nickname, the "Mayberry Miracle".

In October 2008, Griffith appeared with Ron Howard in a Funny or Die video endorsing Barack Obama during his presidential campaign. Griffith also appeared in television advertisements endorsing Democratic candidate Bev Perdue for governor of North Carolina the same year. He also spoke at Easley's inaugurations in 2001 and 2005. At Perdue's inauguration in 2009, he read a poem written by his wife, Cindi Knight. In July 2010, Griffith appeared in a television advertisement promoting changes to Medicare under the Affordable Care Act.

=== Name dispute ===
In 2006, William Harold Fenrick, a resident of Platteville, Wisconsin, legally changed his name to Andrew Jackson Griffith and unsuccessfully ran for sheriff of Grant County. Actor Andy Griffith subsequently sued Fenrick, alleging trademark infringement and invasion of privacy over his use of the name during the election campaign. On May 4, 2007, US District Court Judge John C. Shabaz dismissed Griffith's federal trademark claims, ruling that Fenrick's use of the name in a political campaign was protected as noncommercial speech. The court dismissed the remaining state-law claims without prejudice, leaving them unresolved.

== Health and death ==
In 1983, Griffith developed Guillain–Barré syndrome, which left him paralyzed from the knees down for three months. He subsequently underwent several months of rehabilitation before returning to acting. In a 1987 interview, he recalled wearing leg braces while filming Return to Mayberry (1986) and said that he continued to experience pain. In 2000, a longtime friend reported that the condition still occasionally affected his feet. On May 9, 2000, he underwent quadruple heart-bypass surgery at Sentara Norfolk General Hospital in Norfolk, Virginia, following a heart attack. In 2007, Griffith underwent hip surgery following a fall.

Griffith died on July 3, 2012, at his Roanoke Island home in Manteo, North Carolina, aged 86.According to his death certificate, he had suffered a heart attack approximately 24 hours earlier and had underlying health conditions including hypertension, coronary artery disease, and hyperlipidemia. In accordance with prior arrangements, Griffith was buried at the Griffith Family Cemetery in a private ceremony on Roanoke Island less than five hours after his death.

== Awards and honors ==
Year	Award or honor	Category or details	Result	Ref.
1956	Tony Award	Best Featured Actor in a Play, No Time for Sergeants	Nominated	
1956	Theatre World Award	Outstanding Broadway debut, No Time for Sergeants	Won	
1960	Tony Award	Best Actor in a Musical, Destry Rides Again	Nominated	
1960	Hollywood Walk of Fame	Star for television	Honoured	
1960	Grammy Award	Best Comedy Album, Hamlet	Nominated	
1981	Primetime Emmy Award	Outstanding Supporting Actor in a Limited Series or a Special, Murder in Texas	Nominated	
1987	People's Choice Award	Favorite Male Performer in a New Television Program, Matlock	Won	
1991	Television Hall of Fame	Induction	Inducted	
1997	Grammy Award	Best Southern, Country or Bluegrass Gospel Album, I Love to Tell the Story: 25 Timeless Hymns	Won	
1999	Grammy Award	Best Southern, Country or Bluegrass Gospel Album, Just As I Am	Nominated	
1999	Country Gospel Music Hall of Fame	Induction	Inducted	
2004	TV Land Award	Legend Award, The Andy Griffith Show (shared with cast and crew)	Won	
2005	Presidential Medal of Freedom	Awarded by President George W. Bush	Honoured	
2007	Christian Music Hall of Fame	Induction	Inducted	
2010	North Carolina Music Hall of Fame	Induction	Inducted	

=== Tributes and memorials ===
Year	Tribute	Details	Ref.
2002	Andy Griffith Parkway	Section of US Highway 52 in Mount Airy named in his honor	
2003	Andy and Opie statue	Unveiled in Pullen Park, Raleigh	
2004	Andy and Opie statue	Replica unveiled in Mount Airy	
2004	Martin D-18 Andy Griffith Guitar	Signature model guitar commissioned by C. F. Martin & Company in his honour	
2009	Andy Griffith Museum	A 2,500-square-foot (232 m^{2}) memorabilia facility opened on September 26	

== Filmography ==
=== Film ===
Year	Title	Role	Ref.
1957	A Face in the Crowd	Larry "Lonesome" Rhodes	
1958	No Time for Sergeants	Will Stockdale	
1958	Onionhead	Alvin Woods	
1961	The Second Time Around	Pat Collins	
1969	Angel in My Pocket	Sam Whitehead	
1975	Hearts of the West	Howard Pike	
1985	Rustlers' Rhapsody	Colonel Ticonderoga	
1996	Spy Hard	General Rancor	
2001	Daddy and Them	O.T. Montgomery	
2007	Waitress	Old Joe	
2007	Christmas Is Here Again	Santa Claus (voice)	
2009	Play the Game	Grandpa Joe	

=== Television ===
Year	Title	Role	Notes
1955	The United States Steel Hour	Will Stockdale	Episode: "No Time for Sergeants"; television acting debut
1958	The United States Steel Hour	Harry Emsen	Episode: "Never Know the End"
1960	Make Room for Daddy	Andy Taylor	Episode: "Danny meets Andy Griffith"; backdoor pilot
1960–1968	The Andy Griffith Show	Sheriff Andy Taylor	249 episodes
1966–1968	Gomer Pyle – USMC	Andy Taylor	2 episodes, 1 uncredited
1968–1969	Mayberry R.F.D.	Andy Taylor	5 episodes
1970	Headmaster	Andy Thompson	14 episodes
1971	The New Andy Griffith Show	Andy Sawyer	10 episodes
1972	The Mod Squad	George Carter	Episode: "Big George"
1972	The Strangers in 7A	Artie Sawyer	Television film
1972	Hawaii Five-O	Arnold Lovejoy	Episode: "I'm a Family Crook, Don't Shoot!"
1973	The Doris Day Show	Mitch Folger	Episode: "The Hoax"
1973	Here's Lucy	Andy Johnson	Episode: "Lucy and Andy Griffith"
1973	Go Ask Alice	Priest	Television film
1974	Pray for the Wildcats	Sam Farragut	Television film
1974	Winter Kill	Sheriff Sam McNeill	Television film; series pilot
1974	Savages	Horton Maddock	Television film
1975	Adams of Eagle Lake	Sheriff Sam Adams	2 episodes
1976	The Bionic Woman	Jack Starkey	Episode: "Angel of Mercy"
1976	Street Killing	Gus Brenner	Television film
1976	Six Characters in Search of an Author	The Father	Television film
1976	Frosty's Winter Wonderland	Narrator	Animated television special; voice role
1977	Washington: Behind Closed Doors	Esker Scott Anderson	Television miniseries; 6 episodes
1977	The Girl in the Empty Grave	Police Chief Abel Marsh	Television film
1977	Deadly Game	Police Chief Abel Marsh	Television film
1978–1979	Centennial	Professor Lewis Vernor	Miniseries; 10 episodes
1979	Salvage 1	Harry Broderick	20 episodes (4 unaired)
1979	From Here to Eternity	General Barney Slater	Miniseries; 3 episodes
1979	Roots: The Next Generations	Commander Robert Munroe	Miniseries; episode 6
1980	The Yeagers	Carroll Yeager	2 episodes
1981	Murder in Texas	Ash Robinson	Television film
1982	Saturday Night Live	Andy Taylor	Cameo; episode hosted by Ron Howard
1982	For Lovers Only	Vernon Bliss	Television film
1982	Fantasy Island	Judge Roy Bean	Episode: "Legends/The Perfect Gentleman"
1983	Murder in Coweta County	John Wallace	Television film
1983	The Demon Murder Case	Guy Harris	Television film
1984	Fatal Vision	Victor Worheide	Miniseries
1985	Crime of Innocence	Judge Julius Sullivan	Television film
1985	Hotel	J. Scott "Scotty" Foreman	Episode: "Illusions"
1985	The Love Boat	Larry Cooper	Episode: "Hidden Treasure/Picture from the Past/Ace's Salary"
1986	Diary of a Perfect Murder	Ben Matlock	Television film; Matlock pilot
1986	Return to Mayberry	Andy Taylor	Television film
1986	Under the Influence	Noah Talbot	Television film
1986–1995	Matlock	Ben Matlock / Charlie Matlock	9 seasons
1993	The Andy Griffith Show Reunion	Himself	Television special
1994	The Gift of Love	Phil Doucet	Television film
1995	Gramps	Jack MacGruder	Television film
1997	Diagnosis: Murder	Ben Matlock	2 episodes
1998	Scattering Dad	Hiram	Television film
1999	A Holiday Romance	Jake Peterson	Television film
2001	Family Law	Colin Sawyer	Episode: "The Quality of Mercy"
2001	Dawson's Creek	Andrew Lanier	Episode: "A Winter's Tale"
2003	The Andy Griffith Show Reunion: Back to Mayberry	Himself	Television special
2006	The Very First Noel	Melchior	Animated television special; voice role

== Discography ==
Year	Title	Type	Notes	Ref.
1954	What It Was, Was Football	Comedy EP	Capitol Records, EAP 1–498; originally released as a single in 1953	
1958	Just for Laughs	Comedy album	Capitol Records	
1959	Destry Rides Again	Cast album	Original Broadway cast recording, Decca Records	
1959	Shouts the Blues and Old Timey Songs	Music album	Featuring Brownie McGhee and Sonny Terry	
1961	Songs, Themes and Laughs from the Andy Griffith Show	Comedy and music album	Capitol Records	
1964	Andy and Cleopatra	Comedy album	Capitol Records, T 2066	
1972	Somebody Bigger Than You and I	Gospel album	Columbia Records	
1993	American Originals	Compilation	Capitol Records	
1995	Precious Memories: 33 Timeless Hymns	Gospel album	Collection of Christian hymns	
1996	I Love to Tell the Story: 25 Timeless Hymns	Gospel album	Sparrow Records; Grammy Award winner	
1997	Sings Favorite Old-Time Songs	Compilation	Capitol Special Markets; earlier 1996 edition also exists	
1998	Just as I Am: 30 Favorite Old Time Hymns	Gospel album	Sparrow Records	
1998	Wit & Wisdom of Andy Griffith	Comedy compilation	EMI-Capitol Special Markets	
2000	Favorite Old Time Songs	Compilation	Madacy; reissue of earlier material	
2002	Absolutely the Best	Compilation	Remastered collection	
2003	Back to Back Hits	Comedy compilation	Includes recordings featuring Don Knotts	
2003	The Christmas Guest	Christmas album	Sparrow Records	
2005	Bound for the Promised Land: The Best of Andy Griffith Hymns	Gospel compilation	Sparrow Records	
2005	The Collection	Comedy compilation	Madacy, EMI-Capitol Music Special Markets	
2005	Pickin' and Grinnin': The Best of Andy Griffith	Comedy compilation	Fuel 2000	
