= What It Was, Was Football =

Single by Andy Griffith
- A-side: "What It Was, Was Football"
- B-side: "Romeo and Juliet"
- Released: November 14, 1953
- Recorded: Raleigh, North Carolina
- Genre: Comedy
- Length: 5:40
- Label: Colonial, Capitol Records

"What It Was, Was Football" is a monologue by actor-comedian Andy Griffith. The monologue is a description of a college football game, as seen by a naive country preacher who attends the game by accident and is entirely puzzled by it.

== Production ==
According to radio host Dr. Demento, "What It Was, Was Football" was originally an old vaudeville routine that Griffith, who claimed to have improvised the routine shortly before its first performance, "may have heard ... and subconsciously drawn inspiration from".

At Griffith's request, Milton Alderfer recorded and produced the original master tape in Greensboro, North Carolina. The master was then sent to the Colonial Records label in Chapel Hill, who mass-produced it. Soon after Colonial had sold nearly 50,000 copies of the record, Capitol Records took over distribution and ultimately sold nearly 800,000 copies. The record made it into the Billboard Top 10, peaking at #9 in February 1954.

"What It Was, Was Football" (which remains one of the biggest-selling comedy records of all time) was instrumental in launching Griffith's career in television, stage, and film. On the original single, the monologue is credited to "Deacon Andy Griffith."

Griffith made an appearance on The Ed Sullivan Show in 1954, in large part due to the popularity of the record.

"What It Was, Was Football" was printed in Mad magazine in 1958, with illustrations by artist George Woodbridge. Most of the text of the recording is printed verbatim with faithful renderings of Griffith's accent as heard on the recording. However, Griffith's original climactic description of "the awfullest fight that I have ever seen...in my life!" is moved to an earlier position in the printed version. Also, while the original recording makes no direct reference to a specific university as a setting for the game witnessed, the illustrations in the Mad version refer to both the Ivy League and University of Notre Dame. Due to licensing issues, this adaptation had to be omitted from the Totally MAD CD-ROM collection of the magazine's run.

Bill Cosby and Roger Ebert both claimed to have memorized the record.
