= Robb White =

American novelist (1909–1990)

- Born: Robb White III; June 20, 1909; Baguio, Luzon, Philippines
- Died: November 24, 1990
- Occupation: Writer
- Spouse(s): Rosalie "Rodie" Mason, Joan Gannon, Alice White
- Writing career
- Genre: Adventure novels
- Subjects: Maritime, World War II
- Notable works: The Lion's Paw, Our Virgin Island, Deathwatch

Robb White III (20 June 1909 – 24 November 1990) was an American writer of screenplays, television scripts, and adventure novels. Most of the latter had a maritime setting, often the Pacific Navy during World War II. White was best known for juvenile fiction, though he has proven popular with adults as well. Nearly all his books are out of print; nevertheless, White has a devoted following among baby boomers, many of whom were introduced to him through inexpensive paperbacks available in American schools in the mid-20th century.

== Schools and schooners ==
Robb White III was born to Episcopal missionaries, Placidia (Bridges) and Robb White, in Baguio, Luzon, in the Philippines. At the time, White's father was working with the Igorots, though he later became an Army chaplain, and thus the young family—including Robb's brother and two sisters—traveled extensively before settling in Thomasville, Georgia.

On a 1958 episode of the television show This Is Your Life, White's sister said that "young Bob was the proverbial minister's son, a rebel against all rules and full of deviltry"—as exemplified when the boy rolled eggs off the roof onto a Ladies' Auxiliary meeting on the front lawn.

White had no formal education before entering the Episcopal High School in New York City, New York. He later attended the United States Naval Academy at Annapolis, graduated as an ensign in 1931, and then worked briefly as a draftsman and construction engineer for DuPont.

In his 1953 memoir, Our Virgin Island, White says that by 1937 he "had been halfway round the world and back" and "sailed a schooner around the Atlantic for six months."

== Their virgin island ==
In 1937, White married Rosalie "Rodie" Mason. The couple settled in Sea Cows Bay on the island of Tortola, where the insects were so severe that White put his typewriter in a boat and wrote in the middle of the bay each day. The pair spent weeks sailing daily throughout the islands in search of a more suitable home.

One afternoon, after landing on what they thought was large and better-known Great Camanoe, White walked off in one direction along the beach and Rodie in the other. Meeting less than half an hour later, they realized they had landed on a tiny island, 8-acre (3.2 ha) Marina Cay, which they quickly purchased for $60.

The Whites spent three years on Marina, where they built a small house. These years are detailed in his memoirs, In Privateer's Bay (1939), Our Virgin Island (1953), and Two on the Isle (1985).

White served in the U.S. Navy during World War II and was present at the Battle of Leyte Gulf (1944), which took place near his birthplace. He flew as a pilot in the war and earned eight medals. He was discharged with the rank of lieutenant commander after five years of service.

At the same time as White's recall, he and Rodie lost Marina Cay. The British government had never issued them a license to hold the land and now formally refused, stating that White's published writings had misrepresented conditions in the British Virgin Islands.

Today, the house Robb and Rodie built serves as the reading lounge for a modest-sized resort on the island.

== "A writer's writer" ==
White was determined to be a writer from the age of 13. While working for DuPont, he returned home each day and wrote from 8 p.m. to 2 a.m. In 1931, he quit DuPont after selling his first story to The American Boy for $100.

"A writer's writer, White truly lived his trade". He produced numerous articles and stories for The Saturday Evening Post, Reader's Digest, The Atlantic Monthly, Esquire, and Boys' Life, as well as the United States Naval Institute's Proceedings and various risqué publications; as he told interviewer Tom Weaver, "I wrote as a woman for True Stories and got raped in a hayloft about once a month."

White also wrote for television, including Men of Annapolis and The Silent Service (both 1957), plus episodes of Perry Mason (1961–1965). In the late 1950s and early 1960s he worked with director William Castle on five films: Macabre (1958), House on Haunted Hill (1959), The Tingler (1959), 13 Ghosts (1960), and Homicidal (1961).

Despite all this, White is best known for his 24 novels. The early Run Masked (1938) was White's only effort at a work of adult-themed literature. Most of his books are adventure stories aimed at younger readers — including The Lion's Paw (1946), Deathwatch (1972), Up Periscope (1956) (filmed with James Garner in 1959), Flight Deck (1961), Torpedo Run (1962), and The Survivor (1964). The last four of these—and many others—are set in the same Pacific Theater where White served during World War II. Others—Lion's Paw, plus the rarer Sail Away (1948), Three Against the Sea (1940), and Smuggler's Sloop (1937)—feature youthful protagonists working together against the elements.

"White is on record saying that young people appreciate his work most. He attributed this to their good, decent and courageous nature, exactly the kind of people about whom he enjoyed writing. White confided to Something About the Author that he liked stories that dealt with ordinary people who survived in the face of terrible hardship ... White's work is typically hero-driven, a characteristic that emerges most clearly in Deathwatch, where the protagonist battles not only his human persecutor, but the impersonal harshness of the American desert ... "

Several of his novels were popularized in the school-based Scholastic book sale program in the 1950s, 1960s, and early 1970s; now out of print, these 50-cent paperbacks currently sell for up to $50 on the Internet; rarer White hardbacks can fetch ten times that amount.

In October 2008, a facsimile edition of The Lion's Paw was published by White's widow and her daughter.

== Later life ==
According to a Central PA newspaper tribute to the author honoring the 100th anniversary of his birth, the widely traveled White was a member of a 1950 Harvard anthropological expedition to the Middle East; "he lived in California, Arizona, Georgia, North Carolina, England, Ireland, Scotland, Italy, the West Indies and the French Riviera."

White died on November 22, 1990.

His daughter Bailey is an author and a commentator on NPR. White's son, Robb IV (1941–2006), was a Georgia boatbuilder who penned a 2003 memoir entitled How to Build a Tin Canoe; shorter writings were collected in 2009's Flotsam and Jetsam.

== Bibliography ==
- The Nub (1935)
- The Smuggler's Sloop (1937)
- Midshipman Lee (1938)
- Run Masked (a.k.a., Jungle Fury) (1938)
- In Privateer's Bay (nonfiction, 1939)
- Three Against the Sea (1940)
- Sailor in the Sun (1941)
- The Lion's Paw (1946)
- Secret Sea (1947)
- Sail Away (1948)
- Candy (1949)
- The Haunted Hound (a.k.a. A Dog for Jonathan) (1950)
- Deep Danger (1952)
- Our Virgin Island (memoir, 1953)
- Midshipman Lee of the Naval Academy (1954)
- Up Periscope (1956)
- Flight Deck (1961)
- Torpedo Run (1962)
- The Survivor (1964)
- Surrender (1966)
- Silent Ship, Silent Sea (1967)
- No Man's Land (1969)
- Deathwatch (1972)
- The Frogmen (1973)
- The Long Way Down (1977)
- Firestorm (1979)
- Two on the Isle (memoir, 1985)

== Awards ==
- 1937 New York Herald Tribune prize for best older boys' book of the year, Smuggler's Sloop
- 1972 ALA Best of the Best Books for Young Adults, Deathwatch
- 1972 New York Times Outstanding Book of the Year, Deathwatch
- 1973 Edgar Award for Best Juvenile Mystery of the Year, Deathwatch

== Film adaptations ==
Some of White's works have been adapted to motion pictures.

- Our Virgin Island was filmed as Virgin Island in 1958; it starred John Cassavetes, Sidney Poitier, and Ruby Dee
- Up Periscope was directed by Gordon Douglas in 1959, with James Garner, Edmond O'Brien, Frank Gifford, and Edd Byrnes
- Deathwatch was made for television as Savages in 1974; it featured Andy Griffith as the villain
- The 2015 thriller Beyond the Reach, starring Michael Douglas, Jeremy Irvine and Ronny Cox, was a revamped and updated version of Deathwatch

White's original screenplays for House on Haunted Hill and 13 Ghosts were both adapted for remakes.
