= Standard Brands =

American foods company

Standard Brands Incorporated
- Industry: Food
- Founded: 1929; 97 years ago (merger of Fleischmann Company, Royal Baking Powder Company, founded by E. W. Gillett, Widlar Food Products, and Chase & Sanborn Coffee Company)
- Defunct: 1981
- Fate: Merged with Nabisco, Inc. in 1981
- Successor: Nabisco Brands, Inc.
- Headquarters: New York City, New York, U.S.

Standard Brands was a packaged foods company, formed in 1929 by J. P. Morgan & Co. with the merger of:

- Fleischmann Company
- Royal Baking Powder Company
- E. W. Gillett Company of Canada (1929) - Toronto-based baking goods company (maker of Magic Baking Powder) founded by P. W. Gillett in 1852
- Widlar Food Products Company
- Chase & Sanborn Coffee Company

By 1940, it was the number-two brand of packaged goods after General Foods. By 1955 the company was listed as 75 in the Fortune 500.

Standard Brands made several acquisitions. It bought Planters in 1960, and the Curtiss Candy Company in 1964. In 1970 it purchased the British snack food company Walkers from the Walkers family. In 1979, it acquired Inver House scotch.

Seagrams approached Standard Brands with the idea of a merger. The company merged with Nabisco in 1981 to form Nabisco Brands, Inc.
