= Beyond the Reach =

2014 film by Jean-Baptiste Léonetti

- Theatrical release poster
- Directed by: Jean-Baptiste Léonetti
- Screenplay by: Stephen Susco
- Based on: Deathwatch by Robb White
- Produced by: Michael Douglas; Robert Mitas
- Starring: Michael Douglas; Jeremy Irvine; Hanna Mangan-Lawrence; Ronny Cox
- Cinematography: Russell Carpenter
- Edited by: Adam Wolfe
- Music by: Dickon Hinchliffe
- Production companies: Furthur Films; Literal Media
- Distributed by: Lionsgate; Roadside Attractions
- Release dates: September 6, 2014 (TIFF); April 17, 2015 (United States)
- Running time: 91 minutes
- Country: United States
- Language: English
- Box office: $1.1 million

Beyond the Reach is a 2014 American thriller film directed by Jean-Baptiste Léonetti and written by Stephen Susco, based on Robb White's 1972 novel Deathwatch. The film stars Michael Douglas (who also produced), Jeremy Irvine, Hanna Mangan-Lawrence, and Ronny Cox. It follows a naked and unarmed hunting guide running from a wealthy hunter who wants to ensure his silence in the death of an old man.

The film had its world premiere under its original title The Reach at the 39th Toronto International Film Festival on September 6, 2014. Beyond the Reach was released in theaters and on-demand in the United States on April 17, 2015, by Lionsgate and Roadside Attractions. It received generally negative reviews from critics.

== Plot ==
Ruthless tycoon and trophy collector John Madec flaunts his $500,000 all-terrain vehicle in a small Mojave desert town, buying off the local sheriff to bag an endangered desert bighorn sheep. The sheriff solicits the young but experienced tracker Ben to guide Madec an hour outside of town into the canyon country of Shiprock. Madec taunts Ben over his girlfriend Laina, who has gone away to Colorado on a college swimming scholarship after being gifted a gun that Ben taught her to shoot. When Ben asks to see the permit to hunt the endangered bighorn, Madec offers a wad of cash, which the stunned Ben begrudgingly accepts.

When Madec—with a shoot-first-and-ask-questions-later philosophy—accidentally shoots Charlie, an old prospector, Ben insists that they must report it as an accident. Madec puts another bullet from Ben's gun into the corpse, and after explaining how he can now blackmail Ben with questions of who was the actual killer, offers Ben a deal: Madec will put him through college with a finance major and give him a $300,000-a-year job in return for his complicity in covering up the crime.

When Ben picks up his emergency transponder, Madec destroys it and berates Ben for breaking the deal. Madec then threatens Ben with his high-powered rifle and orders him to strip off his clothes and shoes, forcing him to wander out in the desert, 45 miles from the nearest town, to die of dehydration and exposure. Madec plans to report that Ben went mad, shot Charlie, and wandered off into the barren horizon alone. To ensure his story is not contradicted, Madec watches Ben from a distance, using the scope from his rifle. Ben hides in Charlie's subterranean lair, but Madec blows it up with Charlie's dynamite stash. Before it explodes, Ben escapes with a "treasure map" belonging to Charlie, who Ben vows will not die without justice. Ben finds enough water inside of a barrel to survive. Madec shoots the barrel.

By sunset, Ben uses the map to find a wrist-brace slingshot and some marbles amongst a buried box of Charlie's personal effects. Ben heads for a hidden grotto of water that he and Laina had swum in, only to find it dried up as his sun-burnt body now freezes in the desert night. Madec keeps watch with his vehicle's high-powered floodlights. Ben eventually outsmarts Madec to overcome him with the slingshot.

Back in town, Madec escapes from police custody during a bathroom break to board a helicopter that he solicited using his one phone call. Ben goes to Laina and promises not to leave her side again. An armed Madec sneaks into their house as they sleep and confronts them, but Laina shoots Madec using the same gun Ben gave to her. Madec is then killed by Ben.

== Cast ==
- Michael Douglas as John Madec
- Jeremy Irvine as Ben
- Ronny Cox as Sheriff J. Robb
- Hanna Mangan-Lawrence as Laina
- Patricia Bethune as Secretary
- Martin Palmer as Charlie
- David Garver as Ben's father

== Production ==
On September 7, 2013, Michael Douglas and Jeremy Irvine joined the cast of the film, then titled The Reach. Filming began in Farmington and Shiprock, New Mexico on September 13, 2013, and wrapped in late October.

== Release ==
The film had its world premiere in the Special Presentations section at the 39th Toronto International Film Festival on September 6, 2014. The next day, Lionsgate and Roadside Attractions acquired U.S. distribution rights to the film for $2.2 million.

Roadside Attractions released the film's first trailer on February 5, revealing its new title, Beyond the Reach, and announced that it would release simultaneously in theaters and on-demand in the United States on April 17, 2015.

== Critical reception ==
Beyond the Reach was met with a generally negative reception from critics. On the review aggregator website Rotten Tomatoes, 38% of 64 critics' reviews are positive, with an average rating of 5.0/10. The website's consensus reads: "Beyond the Reach promises goofy genre pleasures, but fails to deliver, losing the viewer -- and a villainous turn from Michael Douglas -- in a misguided story that stumbles to the finish." Metacritic, which uses a weighted average, assigned the film a score of 34 out of 100, based on 19 critics, indicating "generally unfavorable" reviews.

Bill Goodykoontz of The Arizona Republic gave the film two out of five stars, saying "Beyond the Reach is a misfire, one of those movies that never quite rises to the level of guilty pleasure. Michael O'Sullivan of The Washington Post gave the film one and a half stars out of four, saying "There are goofy, primal pleasures to be had in the first two-thirds of the film. But Beyond the Reach exceeds even its humble grasp in the final act, collapsing in a clatter of blockheaded manhunter-movie cliches." Tirdad Derakhshani of The Philadelphia Inquirer gave the film two out of four stars, saying "There's not much here: The characters are paper-thin, and the action is slow, at times agonizingly so."

Linda Barnard of the Toronto Star gave the film three out of four stars, saying "Douglas is in his element and the throwback, stylized look of the production makes Beyond the Reach an entertaining hit of escapist fun." Gary Goldstein of the Los Angeles Times gave the film a negative review, saying "Beyond the Reach is a grueling, unsatisfying thriller that fails the logic test in spectacular ways. Joe Neumaier of New York Daily News gave the film one out of five stars, saying "This film, though, lacks any spine. Director Jean-Baptiste Léonetti isn’t sure if he’s making a Hemingway-lite faceoff or a hemmed-in horror flick."
