= George Hamilton IV =

American country musician (1937–2014)

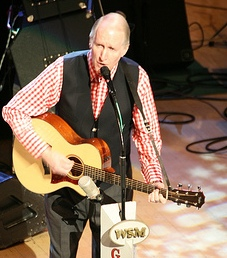
- George Hamilton IV at the Grand Ole Opry in 2007

Background information
- Born: George Hege Hamilton IV; July 19, 1937; Winston-Salem, North Carolina, U.S.
- Died: September 17, 2014 (aged 77) Nashville, Tennessee, U.S.
- Genres: Country
- Occupation: Singer
- Instruments: Vocals, guitar
- Years active: 1956–2014
- Labels: ABC, Colonial, RCA Victor, Lamon
- Website: web.archive.org/web/20120812050350/http://georgeiv.net/ (archived)

George Hege Hamilton IV (July 19, 1937 – September 17, 2014) was an American country musician. He began performing in the late 1950s as a teen idol, switching to country music in the early 1960s.

== Biography ==
Hamilton was born in Winston-Salem, North Carolina, United States, on July 19, 1937, the son of Moravian parents George Hege Hamilton III and Mary Lilian (née Pendry). He was introduced to country music by his paternal grandfather, a railroad worker. His great-grandfather, the first George Hege Hamilton, was a farmer, of a family that came from Scotland to America in 1685.

George Hamilton IV attended Richard J. Reynolds High School, and is among several notable singers and songwriters to have attended that school, including Peter Holsapple and Greg Humphreys. While a 19-year-old student at the University of North Carolina at Chapel Hill, Hamilton recorded "A Rose and a Baby Ruth" for a Chapel Hill record label, Colonial Records. The song, written by John D. Loudermilk, climbed to number six on the United States Billboard Hot 100 chart. By 1960, "A Rose and a Baby Ruth" had attained gold record status for ABC-Paramount (which had acquired the song from Colonial). The self-penned B-side of the record, "If You Don't Know, I Ain't Gonna Tell You", revealed Hamilton's ambitions to be a rockabilly-country singer.

After a string of pop hits, Hamilton joined the Rockabilly Tour playing with Eddie Cochran, Buddy Holly, the Everly Brothers, Little Richard, and several others throughout the country. Hamilton was then invited to Washington, DC, to become a member of the cast of The Jimmy Dean Show, where he performed regularly with Patsy Cline and Jimmy Dean. He also appeared on Dick Clark’s American Bandstand, Arthur Godfrey's Talent Scouts, and The Perry Como Show. Hamilton went on to host his own national television musical/variety shows on ABC and CBS in the late 1950s. In late 1959, Hamilton moved his family to Nashville to further his work as a country musician. On February 8, 1960, Hamilton officially became a member of the Grand Ole Opry. Later that same year, he began recording for RCA Records, having been signed by Chet Atkins.

Hamilton's breakthrough hit was the 1961 song "Before this Day Ends". His biggest hit came two years later with "Abilene", another song penned by Loudermilk, along with Bob Gibson and Lester Brown. The song spent four weeks at number one on Billboard's country singles chart and reached the Top 20 of the Hot 100. The success of "Abilene" was followed with the song "Fort Worth, Dallas or Houston" (a top-ten hit in late 1964).

In 1962, Hamilton started the first Music City USA and Homes of the Stars Bus Tour in Nashville. By the mid-1960s, Hamilton's music began showing a decidedly folk influence. This was especially evident with 1966's "Steel Rail Blues" and "Early Morning Rain" (both by Gordon Lightfoot), and 1967's "Urge for Going" penned by Joni Mitchell. Another 1967 hit was "Break My Mind" (by John D. Loudermilk). One more Hamilton song of this genre was a moderate hit in 1969—the Ray Griff-penned "Canadian Pacific". His last top-five single came in 1970, with "She's a Little Bit Country".

After his American chart success declined in the early 1970s, Hamilton began touring the world, across the Soviet Union, Poland, Australia, the Middle East, and East Asia. Those widely acclaimed international performances earned Hamilton the nickname the International Ambassador of Country Music. In the 1970s, Hamilton was the first American country singer to have his own British TV series on BBC. He also hosted a successful TV series in Canada for six years in the late 1970s. In the 1990s, he played himself in the West End musical Patsy, based on the life of Patsy Cline.

In the 1980s, Hamilton appeared with Billy Graham on Ministry Tours throughout the United States and Canada, and including the UK tour "Mission England".

In 2004, he recorded an acoustic gospel album with producer Dave Moody titled On a Blue Ridge Sunday, which earned Hamilton a Dove Award nomination in the "Best Bluegrass Album of the Year" category by the members of the Gospel Music Association. A single from the album, "Little Mountain Church House", won nominee recognition in the "Best Bluegrass Recorded Song" category the following year.

Until the very late years of his life, Hamilton was a regular at the Grand Ole Opry in Nashville and in country shows throughout the U.S. and the UK. Hamilton celebrated his 50th year as a Grand Ole Opry member in 2010. He mainly concentrated on gospel tours both at home and abroad. In 2007, he collaborated with Live Issue, a group from Northern Ireland, to record a live album based on the life of Joseph Scriven, who wrote the hymn "What a Friend We Have in Jesus". The two also toured together again in 2009.

In 2008, at the height of the soaring U.S. gas prices, Hamilton released "Gasoline", a parody of his classic hit "Abilene". The acoustic single featured "The Oil Spots" (a.k.a. the Moody Brothers & George Hamilton V) and became a hit with audiences during Hamilton's Opry appearances. Hamilton was also a regular participant in the Country's Family Reunion video series.

In 2010, Lamon Records released the album Old Fashioned Hymns, recorded transatlantic with producers Dave Moody in Nashville and Colin Elliott in Ireland. Hamilton was joined on the 28-track collection by a number of musical guests, including Ricky Skaggs, Marty Stuart, Gail Davies, Pat Boone, Del McCoury, Bill Anderson, Connie Smith, Tommy Cash, Cliff Barrows, and George Beverly Shea, among others.

== Personal life and death ==
Hamilton married his high school sweetheart Adelaide "Tink" Peyton and had two sons, George and Peyton, and one daughter, Mary. When Hamilton's elder son George Hege Hamilton V was seven years old, he found one of his father's guitars and began writing songs. He became a singer, using the name "Hege V" because his father and the actor, George Hamilton were already both using the same name. The younger Hamilton said his father "never pushed me", but he eventually began playing in nightclubs. On his tours, which sometimes included his father, Hege V played rhythm guitar and sang harmony and occasionally the lead, including some of his father's songs. George has four grandchildren including George Hege "Nash" Hamilton VI, Peyton McAlester Hamilton, Aubrey Elizabeth Arcure, and James Michael "Mick" Arcure.

Hamilton had a heart attack on September 13, 2014, and died on September 17 at Saint Thomas Midtown Hospital in Nashville. On September 24, the Ryman Auditorium hosted a memorial service, which included performances by Marty Stuart, Ricky Skaggs, the Whites, Jett Williams, Gail Davies, Connie Smith, Dave Moody, Jimmy Capps, Barry and Holly Tashian, the Babcocks, Andrew Greer, and Cindy Morgan. Those who shared stories of Hamilton's life and career at the memorial service included English music historian and journalist Tony Byworth, music writer and author Frye Galliard, artists and songwriters John D. Loudermilk and Bill Anderson, Grand Ole Opry general manager Pete Fisher, and WSM announcer Eddie Stubbs. The service concluded with "Amazing Grace" performed on bagpipes by Nashville Pipes and Drums Pipe Sergeant David Goodman. George Hamilton IV is buried in God's Acre Cemetery in Old Salem, North Carolina.

The George Hamilton IV Collection is located in the Southern Folklife Collection of the Wilson Library of the University of North Carolina at Chapel Hill.

== Honors ==
Hamilton was inducted into the North Carolina Music Hall of Fame in 2010.

The North Carolina Board of Transportation voted to name a bridge on Business 40 for Hamilton. The ceremony naming the bridge was held on July 19, 2016, which would have been Hamilton's 79th birthday.
