= John D. Loudermilk =

American singer-songwriter (1934–2016)

- Also known as: Johnny Dee; Ebe Sneezer
- Born: John Dee Loudermilk Jr. March 31, 1934; Durham, North Carolina, U.S.
- Died: September 21, 2016 (aged 82) Christiana, Tennessee, U.S.
- Genres: Country, pop
- Occupations: Singer, songwriter
- Instrument: Guitar
- Years active: 1950—2016
- Labels: Colonial; Columbia; RCA Victor

John Dee Loudermilk Jr. (March 31, 1934 – September 21, 2016) was an American singer and songwriter. Although he had his own recording career during the 1950s and 1960s, he was primarily known as a songwriter.

His best-known songs include "Indian Reservation", a 1968 hit for UK singer Don Fardon and a U.S. No. 1 hit in 1971 for The Raiders. He wrote "Ebony Eyes", a 1961 U.K. No. 1 and U.S. No. 8 for the Everly Brothers; "Tobacco Road", a 1964 Top 20 hit in both the U.S. and the U.K. for the Nashville Teens; "This Little Bird", a U.K. No. 6 for Marianne Faithfull in 1965; and "Then You Can Tell Me Goodbye", a U.S. Top Ten hit in 1967 for the Casinos and No. 1 country hit for Eddy Arnold the following year.

== Early life and career ==
Loudermilk was born in Durham, North Carolina, to Pauline and John D. Loudermilk Sr., an illiterate carpenter. The family were members of the Salvation Army. He was influenced by Church singing. His cousins Ira and Charlie Loudermilk were known professionally as the Louvin Brothers. Loudermilk was a graduate of Campbell College (now Campbell University), a private North Carolina Baptist Convention-owned college in Buies Creek, North Carolina.

As a young boy, Loudermilk learned the guitar, and while still in his teens wrote a poem that he set to music, "A Rose and a Baby Ruth". The owners of local television station WTVD, where he worked as a graphic artist, allowed him to play the song on-air, resulting in country musician George Hamilton IV putting it on record in 1956. It spent 20 weeks on the Billboard magazine pop chart, reaching No. 6.

After Eddie Cochran had his first hit record with Loudermilk's "Sittin' in the Balcony", Loudermilk's career path was underway.

Loudermilk recorded some of his own songs—including "Sittin' in the Balcony", which reached No. 38 on the pop charts in 1957—as "Johnny Dee", for the North Carolina–based Colonial Records label.

In 1958, he signed with Columbia Records and recorded five unsuccessful singles to 1959, including the original version of "Tobacco Road". In 1961, he signed with RCA Victor, where he had a number of hits:

- "Language of Love" (US No. 32, UK Top 20) in 1961
- "Thou Shalt Not Steal" (US No. 73) in 1962
- "Callin' Doctor Casey" (US No. 83) in 1962 (Note: The song references the television character Ben Casey.)
- "Road Hog" (US No. 65) in 1962

It was as a songwriter that Loudermilk made his mark. In 1963 he wrote another all-time hit for George Hamilton IV, "Abilene". Working out of Nashville, Tennessee, Loudermilk became one of the most productive songwriters of the 1960s and 1970s, penning country and pop music hits for the Everly Brothers, Johnny Tillotson, Chet Atkins, the Nashville Teens, Paul Revere & the Raiders, Johnny Cash, Marianne Faithfull, Stonewall Jackson, Kris Jensen, and Sue Thompson. His song "The Pale Faced Indian" (later known as "Indian Reservation") was a hit in the 1970s; and "Tobacco Road" was a hit in the 1960s and 1970s for, among others, the Nashville Teens, Blues Magoos, Eric Burdon & War, and David Lee Roth. Several singers recorded "Midnight Bus"; Loudermilk commented that the best was by Betty McQuade from Melbourne, Australia.

After more or less retiring from songwriting, Loudermilk helped several songwriters advocacy groups including Nashville Songwriters Association International and the Songwriters Guild of America.

After suffering from prostate cancer and respiratory ailments, Loudermilk died on September 21, 2016, at his home in Christiana, Tennessee. He was 82. The actual cause of death was a heart attack, according to his son Michael.

The John D. Loudermilk Collection is in the Southern Folklife Collection of the Wilson Library of the University of North Carolina at Chapel Hill.

== "Indian Reservation" ==
A well-known story surrounding one of Loudermilk's songs is that, when he was asked by the Viva! NashVegas radio show about the origins of the Raiders' hit song "Indian Reservation", he fabricated the story that he wrote the song after his car was snowed in by a blizzard and he was taken in by Cherokee Indians. A self-professed prankster, he spun the tale that a Cherokee chieftain, "Bloody Bear Tooth" asked him to make a song about his people's plight and the Trail of Tears, even going so far as to claim that he had later been awarded "the first medal of the Cherokee Nation", not for writing the song, but for his "blood"; further fabricating that his "great-great grandparents, Homer and Matilda Loudermilk" were listed on the Dawes Rolls. Had this tall tale been true, he would have been a citizen of the Cherokee Nation, which he was not.

In spite of the song's title, neither the Eastern Band of Cherokee Indians, nor the United Keetoowah Band of Cherokee Indians, nor the Cherokee Nation of Oklahoma communities (the only federally-recognized Cherokee tribes) are known as "reservations". But privately, the family was always told the lineage claim was true.

== Notable compositions ==
- "Abilene" (a hit for George Hamilton IV)
- "Angela Jones" (a hit in the US and Canada for Johnny Ferguson and in the UK for Michael Cox)
- "A Rose and a Baby Ruth" (a hit for George Hamilton IV)
- "Bad News" (covered by Johnny Cash, Johnny Winter, Whitey Morgan and the 78's, and George Thorogood)
- "Big Daddy ('s Alabamy Bound)" (covered by Boots Randolph, Chet Atkins, Jerry Reed, and The Willis Brothers)
- "Blue Train" (George Hamilton IV – 1972)
- "Break My Mind" (covered by George Hamilton IV, Anne Murray, Sammy Davis Jr., Glen Campbell, Linda Ronstadt, Roy Orbison, Gram Parsons, Wreckless Eric, Jerry Lee Lewis, The Flying Burrito Brothers, Vern Gosdin, The Box Tops, and Crystal Gayle)
- "(He's My) Dreamboat" (a hit for Connie Francis)
- "Ebony Eyes" (a hit for the Everly Brothers)
- "Everything's Alright" (a No. 16 Billboard hit for the Newbeats)
- "Google Eye" (a hit for the Nashville Teens)
- "The Great Snowman" (Bob Luman)
- "Hey Ma ! (Hide The Daughter)" (a single for "Little" Jimmy Dickens, 1959)
- "He's Just a Scientist" (a notable recording by John D. Loudermilk himself, also recorded by Connie Francis in 1961, but unreleased until 1987)
- "I Hear It Now" (a notable recording by John D. Loudermilk himself)
- "I Wanna Live" (a hit for Glen Campbell)
- "I'll Never Tell" (recorded by Roy Orbison)
- "Indian Reservation" (a hit for Don Fardon and for Paul Revere and The Raiders; sampled in "Indian Outlaw")
- "Norman" (a hit for Sue Thompson)
- "Paper Tiger" (a hit for Sue Thompson - No. 8 in CAN)
- "Road Hog" (1962; a Portuguese version called "O Calhambeque" released in 1963 by Brazilian singer Roberto Carlos is a very big hit in Brazil, well known to the public today; same story in France with Joe Dassin's version "Bip bip" in 1964)
- "Sad Movies (Make Me Cry)" (a hit for Sue Thompson, also covered by Boney M; a Portuguese version, "Filme Triste", was released in 1962 by Brazilian vocal group Trio Esperança)
- "Sittin' in the Balcony" ( a hit for Eddie Cochran)
- "Sun Glasses", (recorded in 1965 by Skeeter Davis, and in 1967 by Sandy Posey, became a hit in UK in 1984 for Tracey Ullman)
- "Talk Back Trembling Lips" (a hit for both Ernest Ashworth and Johnny Tillotson)
- "The Language of Love"
- "Then You Can Tell Me Goodbye" (a hit for The Casinos (1967), Eddy Arnold (1968), Glen Campbell (1976), Toby Beau (1979), Neal McCoy (1996); also covered by more than a dozen others including Bettye Swann & Johnny Nash
- "This Little Bird" (a hit for Marianne Faithfull and The Nashville Teens - - No. 18 in CAN)
- "Thou Shalt Not Steal" (a hit for Dick and Dee Dee)
- "Tobacco Road" (a hit for The Nashville Teens (1964); also recorded by Lou Rawls (1963, 1966), the Blues Magoos (1966), Jefferson Airplane (1966), Spooky Tooth (1968), Rare Earth (1969), Edgar Winter's White Trash (1970), Eric Burdon and War (1970), Shocking Blue (1972), David Lee Roth (1985), Hugh Cornwell and Richard Thompson (2025))
- "Top 40, News, Weather and Sports" recorded 1961 by Mark Dinning
- "Torture" (a hit in English for Kris Jensen, also recorded in French and German as "Cœur blessé" and Italian as "Pagherai" by Petula Clark)
- "Turn Me On" (made famous by Norah Jones's cover)
- "Waterloo" (a hit for Stonewall Jackson)
- "Weep No More My Baby" (B-side to Brenda Lee's hit "Sweet Nothin's")
- "What A Woman in Love Won't Do" (Sandy Posey)
- "Windy and Warm" (Played by guitarists Chet Atkins and Doc Watson)
- "Writing On The Wall" (recorded by Moon Mullican)
- "You Call It Joggin' (I Call It Runnin' Around) (recorded by Mose Allison and Jimmy Buffett)

== Discography ==
=== Albums ===
Year	Album	Label
1961	Language of Love	RCA
1962	Twelve Sides of John D. Loudermilk	RCA
1966	A Bizarre Collection of the Most Unusual Songs	RCA
1967	Suburban Attitudes in Country Verse	RCA
1968	Country Love Songs	RCA
1969	The Open Mind of John D. Loudermilk	RCA
1970	The Best of John D. Loudermilk	RCA
1971	Volume 1-Elloree	Warner
1979	Just Passing Through	MIM

=== Singles ===
Year	Single	Chart Positions		Album
Year	Single	US Country	US	Album
1957	"Sittin' in the Balcony"	—	38	single only
1961	"Language of Love"	—	32	Language of Love
1962	"Thou Shalt Not Steal"	—	73	Language of Love
1962	"Callin' Dr. Casey"	—	83	Language of Love
1962	"Road Hog"	—	65	Language of Love
1963	"Bad News" (b/w "Guitar Player(Her and Him)")	23	—	singles only
1964	"Blue Train (Of the Heartbreak Line)"	44	132	singles only
1964	"Th' Wife"	45	—	singles only
1965	"That Ain't All"	20	—	singles only
1966	"Silver Cloud Talkin' Blues"	—	—	A Bizarre Collection of the Most Unusual Songs
1966	"You're the Guilty One"	—	—	single only
1967	"It's My Time"	51	—	Suburban Attitudes in Country Verse
1968	"Odd Folks of Okracoke"	—	—	single only
1969	"Brown Girl"	—	—	The Open Mind of John D. Loudermilk
1971	"Lord Have Mercy"	—	—	Volume 1-Elloree
1979	"Every Day I Learn a Little More About Love"	—	—	Just Passing Through

=== Guest singles ===
Year	Single	Artist	US Country
1967	"Chet's Tune"	Some of Chet's Friends	38
