= Deaths in March 1979 =

The following is a list of notable deaths in March 1979. Entries for each day are listed alphabetically by surname. A typical entry lists information in the following sequence:

- Name, age, country of citizenship at birth, subsequent country of citizenship (if applicable), reason for notability, cause of death (if known), and reference.

== March 1979 ==
=== 1 ===
- Mustafa Barzani, 75, Kurdish nationalist leader, he was chosen in 1946 as the leader of the Kurdistan Democratic Party (KDP) to lead the Kurdish revolt against the Kingdom of Iraq, Barzani was the primary political and military leader of the Kurdish separatist movement until his death in March 1979, he led campaigns of armed insurgency against both the Iraqi and Iranian governments, death from lung cancer, while undergoing treatment for his illness at the Georgetown University Hospital in Washington, D.C.
- Dolores Costello, 75, American actress, she was named as one of the WAMPAS Baby Stars in 1926,the destructive effects of early film makeup affected her complexion too severely to camouflage, and were blamed for the early end of her film career

=== 5 ===
- Alan Crofoot, 49, Canadian operatic heldentenor, character tenor specialist, and actor, he committed suicide by jumping from his fifth floor hotel room window in Dayton, Ohio, and he died of his fall-related injuries at the Miami Valley Hospital, according to his manager, Crofoot was suffering from recurring depression, due to the adverse effects of mixing his medication with beer

=== 6 ===
- Wilna Hervey, 84, American actress and artist, in 1919, she was cast in the role of "The Powerful Katrinka" in The Toonerville Trolley silent film series, which was based on Fontaine Fox's Toonerville Folks comic strip, much of the slapstick comedy in the series revolves around Hervey's imposing physical stature, since she stood at the height of 6 feet 3 inches (1.91 m), in contrast with her diminutive male co-stars,Hervey was the life partner of the painter Nan Mason from the late 1910s until her death in 1979
- Charles Wagenheim, 83, American actor, he was killed by his wife's nurse, after he confronted the nurse about a number of forged checks which she had signed in his name.

=== 9 ===
- Jim Fritzell, 59, American screenwriter, he and his writing partner Everett Greenbaum wrote 35 episodes for the war comedy television series M*A*S*H, the writing duo also collaborated on the scripts of several films, including Good Neighbor Sam (1964), The Ghost and Mr. Chicken (1966), The Reluctant Astronaut (1967), The Shakiest Gun in the West (1968), and Angel in My Pocket (1969).
- Quentin Lawrence, 58, English film director and television director, long-time employee of Associated Television (ATV), his works included (among others) the science fiction horror film The Trollenberg Terror (1958) which was credited as one of the inspirations for John Carpenter's 1980 horror film The Fog,, and the first series of the time travel-themed fantasy television show Catweazle (1970-1971)
- Barbara Mullen, 64, American actress,she portrayed Miss Marple in the 1949 London production of the theatrical The Murder at the Vicarage, heart attack
- Steve Sekely, 80, Hungarian film director,he fled the rise of fascism in the interwar period, and worked in Hollywood for much of his subsequent career, directing mostly B movies and early episodic television; in 1940, he was reportedly the first film director hired to direct television plays for American television,he directed his best-known English-language film, the cult science fiction thriller The Day of the Triffids (1963) in the United Kingdom,Howard Keel recalled Sekely as "a lovely man with a thick Hungarian accent and a habit of offering a direction and walking away from you, so you caught very little of what he said. But somehow you knew what he wanted. We all loved him and his humor."

=== 11 ===
- Victor Kilian, 88, American actor, he was blacklisted for his political beliefs during the McCarthyism of the 1950s,he was beaten to death in his own apartment by burglars

=== 15 ===
- Maury M. Cohen, estimated to be about 66 at the time of death, American film producer, he founded Invincible Pictures, one of the Poverty Row studios; his company teamed with Chesterfield Pictures, headed by George R. Batcheller, and they were often referred to as "C and I" or "Chesterfield and Invincible", as the two companies shared the same personnel and equipment,in 1933, Cohen was at the forefront of a movement by independent producers to change the code of the National Recovery Administration (NRA), in order to assure the validity of theaters being able to show a second feature on a program (double feature)
- Léonide Massine, 82, Russian choreographer and ballet dancer, he graduated from the Moscow Imperial Theater School in 1913, and almost immediately joined the Bolshoi Ballet, he was subsequently recruited into the Ballets Russes, following the departure of Vaslav Nijinsky, the company's first male star, Massine became the preeminent male star and took over Nijinsky's roles,he died in his home in Borken, West Germany

=== 16 ===
- Jean Monnet, 90, French civil servant, entrepreneur, diplomat, financier, and administrator, he was an influential supporter of European unity, and he is considered one of the founding fathers of the European Union.

=== 18 ===
- Marjorie Daw, 77, American actress of the silent film era, she started her acting career in her teen years, Daw made her film debut in 1914 and worked steadily during the 1920s, but she retired from acting after the advent of sound film.

=== 19 ===
- Richard Beckinsale, 31, English actor, he co-starred as the prison inmate Lennie Godber in the BBC sitcom Porridge,and as the naive medical student Alan Moore in the ITV sitcom Rising Damp,death by heart attack, caused by coronary artery disease
- Al Hodge, 66, American actor, real estate agent, and security guard for a bank and for the French luxury goods conglomerate Cartier,he portrayed the superhero Green Hornet in the eponymous radio series from 1936 until 1943, and again in 1945, in 1949, Hodge replaced Richard Coogan in the role of the space adventurer Captain Video in the television series Captain Video and His Video Rangers,death by heart failure while staying in the George Washington Hotel in New York City.

=== 22 ===
- Ben Lyon, 78, American actor and studio executive for the company 20th Century-Fox,he signed the first studio contract for the aspiring actress Marilyn Monroe,he suffered a fatal heart attack while vacationing on the Queen Elizabeth 2 cruise ship near Honolulu, Hawaii

=== 23 ===
- Philip Bourneuf, 71, American character actor and vaudevillian, he started his career in his teen years, while still a high school student,he was part of the original cast of actors of the American Repertory Theater,he was a founding member of the Actors Studio

=== 24 ===
- John Meston, 64, American scriptwriter, he co-created the long-running Western series Gunsmoke, and he developed storylines and wrote radio scripts and teleplays for 379 episodes of this series,he also served as a writer and editorial supervisor for the radio programs Escape, Suspense, Lux Radio Theater, and Fort Laramie; and in the 1970s, he served as a frequent writer for two television series, Little House on the Prairie and Hec Ramsey,death by cerebral hemorrhage

=== 26 ===
- Jean Stafford, 63, American novelist and short story writer, her debut novel Boston Adventure (1944) was a best-seller, but she became better known for her short stories, many of which were published in The New Yorker, she won seven O Henry Awards for her short stories, and in 1970 The Collected Stories of Jean Stafford won the Pulitzer Prize for Fiction, she developed emphysema in the final years of her life and she died as a patientin a clinic

=== 28 ===
- Ronald Adam, 82, British officer of both the Royal Flying Corps and the Royal Air Force, actor on stage and screen, playwright and theatre manager,he spend several months during World War I as a prisoner-of-war in the German Empire after his military airplane was shot down by a German pilot, identified as either Hans Kirschstein or Manfred von Richthofen,he served as a wing commander during the Battle of Britain (1940), tasked with co-ordinating interceptions by the RAF Fighter Command
- Emmett Kelly, 80, American circus performer, he created the clown character "Weary Willie", based on the hobos of the Great Depression, he joined the Ringling Bros. and Barnum & Bailey Circus in 1942, after being named as "the world's funniest clown" in the publicity campaign of a rival circus,death by heart attack in the front yard of his own home

=== 29 ===
- Yahya Petra of Kelantan, 61, he served as the king of Malaysia from 1975 until his death in office in 1979,death by heart attack at the National Palace

=== 30 ===
- Airey Neave, 63, British politician, lawyer, and soldier, he served as the campaign manager of Margaret Thatcher during her successful attempt to become the new leader of the Conservative Party, he subsequently served as the Shadow Secretary of State for Northern Ireland until his death in office in 1979, he was assassinated by the Irish National Liberation Army (INLA) with a car bomb fixed under his car, the bomb detonated in the car park of the Palace of Westminster in London and mortally wounded Neave, who died shortly after being admitted to hospital.
- José María Velasco Ibarra, 86, Ecuadorian politician,he served five non-consecutive terms as the president of Ecuador (1934–1935, 1944–1947, 1952–1956, 1960–1961, and 1968–1972), in 1970, he suspended the constitution and seized dictatorial powers,Velasco was a fiery populist who did not have a formal party organization, his populist rhetoric attracted enthusiastic followers, as he presented himself as the advocate of the poor and the downtrodden,; when in office he was not responsible for major reforms, but he used patronage effectively to maintain his largely inefficient and corrupt administrations.

== Sources ==
- Barabas, SuzAnne and Barabas, Gabor (1990). Gunsmoke: A Complete History and Analysis of the Legendary Broadcast Series. Jefferson, North Carolina: McFarland and Company, 1990
- Berry, Chris (2021). "In the Spotlight". Bandwagon. Vol. 65, no. 2. https://archive.org/details/bandwagon-2020-64-2
- Keel, Howard (2005). Only make believe. Barricade.
- Kelly, Emmett (1954). Clown My Life In Tatters And Smiles. F. Beverly Kelley. New York: Prentice-Hall. ASIN B000NPTF0I. OCLC 470515337.
- Ryan, Maureen. 1994. "Green Visors and Ivory Towers: Jean Stafford and the New Journalism." The Kenyon Review, Autumn, 1994, New Series, Vol. 16, No. 4 pp. 104-119. Kenyon College. https://www.jstor.org/stable/4337139 Accessed 17 February, 2026.
- Scheijen, Sjeng (2010). Diaghilev: A Life. Profile Books. ISBN 978-1846681646.
