= List of The Andy Griffith Show episodes =

This is a list of episodes from the CBS television comedy The Andy Griffith Show. The first episode aired on October 3, 1960, and the final episode aired on April 1, 1968. There were 249 episodes in all, 159 in black and white (seasons 1–5) and 90 in color (seasons 6–8). The backdoor pilot for the series was an episode of The Danny Thomas Show, "Danny Meets Andy Griffith", which first aired on February 15, 1960.

== Series overview ==
Season	Episodes	Originally released		Rank	Rating	Viewers (millions)
Season	Episodes	First released	Last released	Rank	Rating	Viewers (millions)
Intro	1	February 15, 1960		—N/a	—N/a	—N/a
1	32	October 3, 1960	May 22, 1961	4	27.8	13.12
2	31	October 2, 1961	May 7, 1962	7	27.0	13.10
3	32	October 1, 1962	May 6, 1963	6	29.7	14.93
4	32	September 30, 1963	May 18, 1964	5	29.4	15.17
5	32	September 21, 1964	May 3, 1965	4	28.3	14.91
6	30	September 13, 1965	April 11, 1966	6	26.9	14.48
7	30	September 12, 1966	April 10, 1967	3	27.4	15.10
8	30	September 11, 1967	April 1, 1968	1	27.6	15.64

== Pilot (1960) ==
"No. in series" and "No. in season" for the pilot dictate the airing and location of the episode within the parent series.

No. overall	No. in season	Title	Directed by	Written by	Original release date
205	20	"Danny Meets Andy Griffith"	Sheldon Leonard	Arthur Stander	February 15, 1960
Danny Williams (Danny Thomas) and family drive through the town of Mayberry. He gets pulled over by Sheriff Andy Taylor (Andy Griffith) for going through a stop sign. Between insulting Andy, Danny complains that there was no cross street where the sign was. Andy says they only raised enough money for the sign, not the street. Danny says it's nothing but a tourist trap. Danny wants to see the Justice of the Peace. Danny's wife Kathy (Marjorie Lord) tells him to just pay the fine. The Justice of the Peace turns out to be Andy. Just then Will Hoople (Frank Cady), the Town Drunk, comes in and locks himself up. Danny wants to expose Andy as a crooked Sheriff and calls the local newspaper. Turns out Andy is also the editor of the paper. Danny decides to have the Face To Face TV show come to Mayberry to expose Andy. It's the third day Danny has spent in jail. Danny learns that Andy lost his wife and he has a little boy named Opie (Ron Howard). Danny starts to have a change of heart about paying the fine, but then Andy says something that gets him mad. Henrietta Perkins (Frances Bavier) comes by the Court House and explains why she hasn't been able to pay her taxes. Andy finds a way to help Henrietta. The TV crew arrives and Danny presents his case and does a little exaggerating. Andy presents his case and Danny apologizes to him. But there's still the question of the fine. Will Wright as Mr. Johnson. Rance Howard as TV Crewman. George Fenneman as Face to Face interviewer.

== Black & White episodes (1960–1965) ==
=== Season 1 (1960–61) ===
No. overall	No. in season	Title	Directed by	Written by	Original release date	Viewers (millions)
1	1	"The New Housekeeper"	Sheldon Leonard	Jack Elinson & Charles Stewart	October 3, 1960	10.08
After the Taylors' old housekeeper, Rose (Mary Treen), gets married and moves away, Aunt Bee (Frances Bavier) moves in to take care of Andy (Andy Griffith) and Opie (Ron Howard). However, Opie refuses to accept her.
2	2	"The Manhunt"	Don Weis	Charles Stewart & Jack Elinson	October 10, 1960	11.39
Andy and Barney (Don Knotts) decide to take action when the state police leave them out of a manhunt for an escaped criminal. First appearance of Otis the town drunk, played by Hal Smith.
3	3	"The Guitar Player"	Don Weis	Jack Elinson & Charles Stewart	October 17, 1960	N/A
Andy helps guitarist Jim Lindsey (James Best) get a chance at stardom by arresting a band passing through town and having Jim audition for them.
4	4	"Ellie Comes to Town"	Don Weis	Charles Stewart & Jack Elinson	October 24, 1960	10.12
Pharmacist Ellie Walker (Elinor Donahue) comes to Mayberry to help her ailing uncle run his drugstore, but she has to adjust to the town's unusual ways and people, including Emma the hypochondriac.
5	5	"Irresistible Andy"	Don Weis	David Adler^{1}	October 31, 1960	11.07
Andy suspects that Ellie is thinking about marriage when he invites her to the annual church picnic.
6	6	"Runaway Kid"	Don Weis	Arthur Stander	November 7, 1960	10.40
Andy teaches Opie about keeping promises, then must figure what to do with a friend of Opie's who has run away from home and sworn Opie to secrecy.
7	7	"Andy the Matchmaker"	Don Weis	Arthur Stander	November 14, 1960	11.98
Andy and Ellie stage a fake robbery at the pharmacy to boost Barney's self-confidence. Andy also encourages Barney to date shy Rosemary, whom he had only been walking to church on Sundays.
8	8	"Opie's Charity"	Don Weis	Arthur Stander	November 28, 1960	11.93
Andy is disappointed in Opie for giving so little to a charity drive, until he learns the reason. Meanwhile, a former Mayberry resident who was presumed dead unexpectedly returns to town.
9	9	"A Feud Is a Feud"	Don Weis	David Adler^{1}	December 5, 1960	11.80
Andy seeks to end a long-running family feud before joining two lovers (one from each family) in marriage.
10	10	"Ellie for Council"	Bob Sweeney	Jack Elinson & Charles Stewart	December 12, 1960	10.60
Ellie starts a battle of the sexes when she decides to run for town council.
11	11	"The Christmas Story"	Bob Sweeney	David Adler^{1}	December 19, 1960	N/A
Despite being forced by a Scrooge-like store owner Ben Weaver (Will Wright) to arrest moonshiner Sam Muggins on Christmas Eve, Andy still manages to have the most wonderful Christmas in Mayberry. This is the only Christmas episode in the eight-year series.
12	12	"Stranger in Town"	Don Weis	Arthur Stander	December 26, 1960	11.35
The citizens of Mayberry are suspicious of a young stranger (William Lanteau) who seems to know everything about them. First appearance of Floyd the barber, played for the only time by Walter Baldwin.
13	13	"Mayberry Goes Hollywood"	Bob Sweeney	Benedict Freedman & John Fenton Murray	January 2, 1961	13.79
Mayberry is chosen as the setting for an upcoming movie, and the whole town (except Andy) gets carried away with all the glamour. First appearance of Howard McNear as Floyd Lawson, the barber.
14	14	"The Horse Trader"	Bob Sweeney	Jack Elinson & Charles Stewart	January 9, 1961	13.60
Andy makes up a story about an old useless cannon in order to sell it to an antique dealer (Casey Adams aka Max Showalter) – even though he had just told Opie about honesty.
15	15	"Those Gossipin' Men"	Bob Sweeney	Charles Stewart & Jack Elinson	January 16, 1961	13.70
Aunt Bee sets out to prove that men are bigger gossips than women. The men spread a rumor that a visiting shoe salesman (Jack Finch) may actually be a talent scout. The salesman is puzzled when townspeople individually come to his hotel room to perform for him.
16	16	"The Beauty Contest"	Bob Sweeney	Jack Elinson & Charles Stewart	January 23, 1961	14.16
Andy is made sole judge of a beauty contest, and the townspeople pester him by promoting their favorite contestants. He ends up choosing an unlikely woman.
17	17	"Alcohol and Old Lace"	Gene Reynolds	Charles Stewart & Jack Elinson	January 30, 1961	14.26
Two spinster sisters point Andy and Barney in the direction of local moonshiners, eliminating competition for their own moonshining operation.
18	18	"Andy the Marriage Counselor"	Gene Reynolds	David Adler^{1}	February 6, 1961	14.54
A bickering couple (Jesse White) and (Claudia Bryar) are always disturbing the peace with their arguing, so Andy tries an experiment to make them act nicely to each other.
19	19	"Mayberry on Record"	Gene Reynolds	John Fenton Murray & Benedict Freedman	February 13, 1961	13.55
A stranger comes to town to produce a record of Andy and a local bluegrass band, but Andy suspects he's a con artist.
20	20	"Andy Saves Barney's Morale"	Bob Sweeney	David Adler^{1}	February 20, 1961	14.68
Andy goes out of town leaving Barney in charge for the day, but when he returns, he finds that Barney put the whole town in jail.
21	21	"Andy and the Gentleman Crook"	Bob Sweeney	Ben Gershman & Leo Solomon	February 27, 1961	14.49
'Gentleman' Dan Caldwell (Dan Tobin), a notorious con man being held in the Mayberry jail, becomes a hero to everyone but Andy, who is not fooled.
22	22	"Cyrano Andy"	Bob Sweeney	Jack Elinson & Charles Stewart	March 6, 1961	14.31
Andy tries to help Barney win over Thelma Lou (Betty Lynn), but Barney thinks Andy is trying to steal her away.
23	23	"Andy and Opie, Housekeepers"	Bob Sweeney	David Adler^{1}	March 13, 1961	14.35
Andy and Opie try to break their habit of making the house a mess while Aunt Bee is away tending to a sick cousin. First appearance of Hope Summers's character Clara Edwards, called Bertha Edwards in this episode.
24	24	"The New Doctor"	Bob Sweeney	Charles Stewart & Jack Elinson	March 27, 1961	14.07
Andy suspects that the handsome new doctor (George Nader) is trying to steal Ellie away from him.
25	25	"A Plaque for Mayberry"	Bob Sweeney	Leo Solomon & Ben Gershman	April 3, 1961	14.40
The Women's Historical Society has discovered that a descendant of a Revolutionary War hero is living in Mayberry, but that person turns out to be Otis, the town drunk.
26	26	"The Inspector"	Bob Sweeney	Jack Elinson & Charles Stewart	April 10, 1961	14.07
Ralph Case (Tod Andrews) a by-the-book state inspector, intends to impeach Andy and Barney for running the courthouse carelessly.
27	27	"Ellie Saves a Female"	Bob Sweeney	David Adler^{1}	April 17, 1961	N/A
Ellie decides to give a shy farm girl a beauty makeover, despite the protests of the girl's overbearing father.
28	28	"Andy Forecloses"	Bob Sweeney	Leo Solomon & Ben Gershman	April 24, 1961	N/A
Andy tries to help a financially strapped family keep their home, in spite of having to give them a foreclosure notice initiated by heartless old mortgage holder Ben Weaver. First episode in which Juanita Beasley, a waitress Barney sometimes dates, is mentioned.
29	29	"Quiet Sam"	Bob Sweeney	Jim Fritzell & Everett Greenbaum	May 1, 1961	N/A
Barney is suspicious of reticent farmer Sam Becker (William Schallert) and his strange behaviors, believing Sam may be either harboring a criminal or growing illegal crops. Andy soon discovers the real trouble when Sam calls him to attend to his wife Lily, who is in labor.
30	30	"Barney Gets His Man"	Bob Sweeney	Leo Solomon & Ben Gershman	May 8, 1961	N/A
Barney accidentally helps capture Eddie Brooke (Barney Phillips), an escaped convict. Brooke vows revenge before escaping again, and Andy must deal with a terrified Barney.
31	31	"The Guitar Player Returns"	Bob Sweeney	Charles Stewart & Jack Elinson	May 15, 1961	N/A
Jim Lindsey returns to Mayberry after supposedly making it big in show business, but it turns out he's out of work and flat broke. Last appearance of Ellie Walker.
32	32	"Bringing Up Opie"	Bob Sweeney	Jack Elinson & Charles Stewart	May 22, 1961	N/A
Andy and Aunt Bee forbid Opie from visiting the courthouse after school; with nothing else to do, Opie wanders away from home and falls asleep in the back of a delivery truck.

=== Season 2 (1961–62) ===
No. overall	No. in season	Title	Directed by	Written by	Original release date	Viewers (millions)
33	1	"Opie and the Bully"	Bob Sweeney	David Adler^{1}	October 2, 1961	12.76
When Andy finds out a bully is repeatedly taking Opie's milk money, he encourages Opie to stand up for himself.
34	2	"Barney's Replacement"	Bob Sweeney	Jack Elinson & Charles Stewart	October 9, 1961	12.05
Barney thinks that a state's attorney (Mark Miller), who's been sent to Mayberry for law enforcement training, has been sent to replace him.
35	3	"Andy and the Woman Speeder"	Bob Sweeney	Charles Stewart & Jack Elinson	October 16, 1961	N/A
Andy gives a woman from Washington (Jean Hagen) a fine for speeding, but she refuses to pay and is locked up in the Mayberry jail, playing on Barney's sympathy until her trial.
36	4	"Mayberry Goes Bankrupt"	Bob Sweeney	Jack Elinson & Charles Stewart	October 23, 1961	12.15
Andy is forced to evict an old man (Andy Clyde) for failing to pay back taxes, but he finds a century-old savings bond among the man's possessions which has apparently grown to an enormously high value of $349,119.27.
37	5	"Barney on the Rebound"	Bob Sweeney	Charles Stewart & Jack Elinson	October 30, 1961	12.29
After an argument with Thelma Lou, Barney finds a new girlfriend, who turns out to be a visiting con artist (Beverly Tyler) with her husband-associate (Jackie Coogan).
38	6	"Opie's Hobo Friend"	Bob Sweeney	Harvey Bullock	November 13, 1961	12.76
Opie befriends a drifter (Buddy Ebsen), who proves to be a bad influence.
39	7	"Crime-Free Mayberry"	Bob Sweeney	Paul Henning	November 20, 1961	11.87
Two crooks posing as an FBI agent and a reporter pretend to be doing a story on Mayberry's low crime rate, so they can rob the town bank. Andy is not fooled.
40	8	"The Perfect Female"	Bob Sweeney	Jack Elinson & Charles Stewart	November 27, 1961	12.24
After Barney and Thelma Lou set Andy up on a blind date with Karen Moore (Gail Davis), Thelma Lou's visiting cousin, Andy tries to find out if she is "the one." Karen surprises Andy by besting him at skeet-shooting.
41	9	"Aunt Bee's Brief Encounter"	Bob Sweeney	Leo Solomon & Ben Gershman	December 4, 1961	11.82
Aunt Bee falls for Mr. Wheeler (Edgar Buchanan), a handyman who has a way with women. He temporarily moves into their house, while Andy has to finish most of the chores that Wheeler starts.
42	10	"The Clubmen"	Bob Sweeney	Fred S. Fox & Iz Elinson	December 11, 1961	11.21
Roger Courtney (George N. Neise) invites Andy and Barney to a posh gentlemen's Esquire Club in Raleigh, as potential new members. However, at the club's get-acquainted party, the members are impressed enough by Andy to offer him membership, but don't want Barney. Andy tells Barney that the club only wanted one of them, and Barney immediately assumes it's Andy they didn't approve of.
43	11	"The Pickle Story"	Bob Sweeney	Harvey Bullock	December 18, 1961	N/A
Andy and Barney replace Aunt Bee's bad-tasting homemade pickles with store-bought pickles, but find themselves in a real one when she decides to enter her pickles in a contest at the county fair. (This episode was voted by fans as their favorite of the entire series).
44	12	"Sheriff Barney"	Bob Sweeney	Leo Solomon & Ben Gershman	December 25, 1961	10.49
When Barney is offered the sheriff's post in a neighboring town, he and Andy trade places for the day to see if Barney is up to the job.
45	13	"The Farmer Takes a Wife"	Bob Sweeney	Charles Stewart & Jack Elinson	January 1, 1962	12.59
A farmer (Alan Hale, Jr.) comes to Mayberry looking for a wife in an unconventional manner, and chooses Barney's girlfriend Thelma Lou, much to Barney's distress.
46	14	"The Keeper of the Flame"	Bob Sweeney	Jack Elinson & Charles Stewart	January 8, 1962	13.92
Opie is put in charge of bringing a candle and matches to a secret club, and soon after is accused of burning down Jubal Foster (Everett Sloane)'s barn, where the club met.
47	15	"Bailey's Bad Boy"	Bob Sweeney	Leo Solomon & Ben Gershman	January 15, 1962	13.62
A spoiled rich teenager (Bill Bixby) is arrested for speeding and sideswiping a farmer's truck. Andy helps him learn to take responsibility for his behavior.
48	16	"The Manicurist"	Bob Sweeney	Charles Stewart & Jack Elinson	January 22, 1962	14.55
A manicurist (Barbara Eden) sets up shop in Floyd's barber shop, but ends up unintentionally causing trouble when the men of Mayberry start flocking to her for manicures, making their wives jealous. Last appearance of Mayor Pike.
49	17	"The Jinx"	Bob Sweeney	Jack Elinson & Charles Stewart	January 29, 1962	13.13
Andy tries to help a Mayberry resident (John Qualen) end his apparent bad luck and convince him that he is not hexed, as many of the townspeople believe.
50	18	"Jailbreak"	Bob Sweeney	Harvey Bullock	February 5, 1962	14.50
Barney clumsily lets a prisoner (Allan Melvin) escape, so Andy and Barney have to recapture him.
51	19	"A Medal for Opie"	Bob Sweeney	David Adler^{1}	February 12, 1962	14.21
Opie must learn the value of good sportsmanship when he comes in last in a footrace he was sure he would win.
52	20	"Barney and the Choir"	Bob Sweeney	Charles Stewart & Jack Elinson	February 19, 1962	13.92
Barney joins the Mayberry choir, but proves to be a terrible singer. Not wanting to hurt Barney's feelings, Andy must find a way to keep him in the choir but neutralize his singing.
53	21	"Guest of Honor"	Bob Sweeney	Jack Elinson & Charles Stewart	February 26, 1962	13.67
A pickpocket (Jay Novello) is ironically chosen as the random "guest of honor" during the Mayberry Founder's Day celebration.
54	22	"The Merchant of Mayberry"	Bob Sweeney	Leo Solomon & Ben Gershman	March 5, 1962	14.06
Andy helps a struggling traveling salesman (Sterling Holloway) stay in business, against the wishes of crusty store owner Ben Weaver (Will Wright).
55	23	"Aunt Bee the Warden"	Bob Sweeney	Charles Stewart & Jack Elinson	March 12, 1962	13.97
With the courthouse jail full of moonshiners, Otis has to serve his time in the Taylor house, under the supervision of Aunt Bee who keeps him busy with chores.
56	24	"The County Nurse"	Bob Sweeney	Jack Elinson & Charles Stewart	March 19, 1962	13.28
Andy tries to talk defiantly unwilling Rafe Hollister (Jack Prince) into getting a tetanus shot from county nurse Mary Simpson (Julie Adams).
57	25	"Andy and Barney in the Big City"	Bob Sweeney	Harvey Bullock	March 26, 1962	13.33
Andy and Barney travel to Raleigh for a meeting with the Commissioner, but are told they will not be receiving any financial assistance due to lack of arrests. Barney decides to stake out a suspected "Jewel Thief", inadvertently alerting a real thief to the presence of emeralds in the hotel. Arte Johnson has a small role as the hotel clerk.
58	26	"Wedding Bells for Aunt Bee"	Bob Sweeney	Harvey Bullock	April 2, 1962	14.11
Andy and Aunt Bee each think the other is anxious for her to marry the town dry cleaner, Fred Goss (Fred Sherman) who talks incessantly about his work.
59	27	"Three's a Crowd"	Bob Sweeney	Charles Stewart & Jack Elinson	April 9, 1962	13.87
Barney keeps interfering with the romance between Andy and county nurse Mary (Sue Ane Langdon), preventing them from being alone.
60	28	"The Bookie Barber"	Bob Sweeney	Harvey Bullock & R. Allen Saffian	April 16, 1962	N/A
Floyd lets an out-of-town barber (Herb Vigran) rent space in his shop, but the new tenant turns out to be running an illegal gambling operation.
61	29	"Andy on Trial"	Bob Sweeney	Jack Elinson & Charles Stewart	April 23, 1962	N/A
Big-city newspaper publisher J. Howard Jackson (Roy Roberts) is charged with a traffic violation. He uses his attractive reporter (Ruta Lee) to trick Barney into giving her some 'dirt' on Andy, so they can publish a story that will get Andy fired.
62	30	"Cousin Virgil"	Bob Sweeney	Phillip Shuken & John L. Greene	April 30, 1962	N/A
Barney's bumbling cousin Virgil (Michael J. Pollard) visits Mayberry and ends up causing trouble for Andy.
63	31	"Deputy Otis"	Bob Sweeney	Iz Elinson & Fred S. Fox	May 7, 1962	N/A
Andy makes Otis a temporary deputy, so he can impress his visiting brother Ralph (Stanley Adams), and Ralph's wife (Amzie Strickland).

=== Season 3 (1962–63) ===
No. overall	No. in season	Title	Directed by	Written by	Original release date	Viewers (millions)
64	1	"Mr. McBeevee"	Bob Sweeney	R. Allen Saffian & Harvey Bullock	October 1, 1962	16.33
Opie's description of his new friend Mr. McBeevee (Karl Swenson) is hard to believe.
65	2	"Andy's Rich Girlfriend"	Bob Sweeney	Jim Fritzell & Everett Greenbaum	October 8, 1962	15.04
Andy tries to comprehend the upper-class wealth of his girlfriend Peggy McMillan (Joanna Moore), whom Barney insists is incompatible.
66	3	"Andy and the New Mayor"	Bob Sweeney	Harvey Bullock & R. Allen Saffian	October 15, 1962	13.50
Mayor Roy Stoner (Parley Baer) does not like the way Andy does his job. In his overzealousness to find a harmless man released early from jail, the Mayor is treed by a bear.
67	4	"Andy and Opie – Bachelors"	Bob Sweeney	Everett Greenbaum & Jim Fritzell	October 22, 1962	N/A
Andy and Opie have Peggy take care of them while Aunt Bee is away. Floyd teases Andy, warning him that she has serious intentions.
68	5	"The Cow Thief"	Bob Sweeney	R. Allen Saffian & Harvey Bullock	October 29, 1962	14.39
Mayor Stoner goes over Andy's head and calls in an expert to solve a string of cow thefts, in which strange shoeprints are the only clue.
69	6	"Barney Mends a Broken Heart"	Bob Sweeney	Aaron Ruben	November 5, 1962	13.25
After Andy and Peggy have a fight, Barney tries to fix Andy up with other girls, who are a poor match, including the eccentric Lydia Crosswaithe. First episode with "The Fun Girls".
70	7	"Lawman Barney"	Bob Sweeney	Aaron Ruben	November 12, 1962	13.70
Barney loses his self-esteem when two farmers ignore his order to stop illegally selling produce from their truck.
71	8	"The Mayberry Band"	Bob Sweeney	Jim Fritzell & Everett Greenbaum	November 19, 1962	14.39
Andy is determined to get the Mayberry band into the state band competition, no matter how bad they sound. The mayor is reluctant to finance their trip, so Andy employs a clever trick.
72	9	"Floyd, the Gay Deceiver"	Bob Sweeney	Aaron Ruben	November 26, 1962	13.70
Floyd has pretended to be a rich man in letters to his female pen pal, who then suddenly decides to visit. Andy hastily arranges a deception so that Floyd can continue the ruse.
73	10	"Opie's Rival"	Bob Sweeney	Sid Morse	December 3, 1962	13.10
Opie feels threatened by Andy's relationship with Peggy. Last appearance of Peggy.
74	11	"Convicts at Large"	Bob Sweeney	Everett Greenbaum & Jim Fritzell	December 10, 1962	13.45
Barney and Floyd are taken hostage by three escaped female convicts in a country cabin. Last appearance of Floyd until episode 118 due to Howard McNear's stroke.
75	12	"The Bed Jacket"	Bob Sweeney	Harvey Bullock & R. Allen Saffian	December 17, 1962	13.00
Andy tries to get a one-of-a-kind bed jacket that Aunt Bee wants for her birthday, while Mayor Stoner tries to mend a disagreement with his wife using the same jacket.
76	13	"The Bank Job"	Bob Sweeney	Jim Fritzell & Everett Greenbaum	December 24, 1962	N/A
Barney sets out to prove that the Mayberry bank can be easily robbed because of lax security measures. Gomer Pyle (Jim Nabors) makes his debut.
77	14	"One-Punch Opie"	Bob Sweeney	Harvey Bullock	December 31, 1962	13.05
Opie learns to stand up to an older new boy in town, who likes to cause trouble. Richard Keith who formerly played Little Ricky on I Love Lucy, appears in this episode as Carter French.
78	15	"Barney and the Governor"	Bob Sweeney	Bill Freedman & Henry Sharp	January 7, 1963	14.54
Barney issues a parking ticket on the governor's car and refuses to tear it up. The governor (Carl Benton Reid) visits Mayberry to congratulate Barney's devotion to duty, but Barney mistakenly believes he is in trouble.
79	16	"Man in a Hurry"	Bob Sweeney	Everett Greenbaum & Jim Fritzell	January 14, 1963	14.79
Businessman Malcolm Tucker (Robert Emhardt) suffers a car breakdown in Mayberry on a Sunday, and he is impatient to get it fixed in time for his meeting in Charlotte. Wally the mechanic does not work on Sundays, so Andy's family welcomes Malcolm to stay with them, and helps him remember how to slow down. Andy performs the hymn The Church in the Wildwood on the front porch. (This story was voted by fans as their second-favorite of the entire series).
80	17	"High Noon in Mayberry"	Bob Sweeney	Jim Fritzell & Everett Greenbaum	January 21, 1963	15.79
Barney fears a revenge plot is afoot when Andy gets a letter from Luke Comstock (Leo Gordon), an ex-con whom Andy crippled in a shootout years earlier. Elements of this episode were based on Leo Gordon's real-life story.
81	18	"The Loaded Goat"	Bob Sweeney	Harvey Bullock	January 28, 1963	16.93
Andy and Barney must deal with a farmer's goat that has eaten several sticks of dynamite.
82	19	"Class Reunion"	Charles Irving	Everett Greenbaum & Jim Fritzell	February 4, 1963	16.09
Andy meets an old sweetheart at a high school reunion, and their romance briefly rekindles. (The yearbook has actual high school pictures of Andy Griffith and Don Knotts.)
83	20	"Rafe Hollister Sings"	Charles Irving	Harvey Bullock	February 11, 1963	16.24
Rafe Hollister (Jack Prince), an uncouth but golden-voiced farmer, wins a contest to sing at a Ladies' Society Musicale. Mayor Stoner puts Andy in charge of making sure Rafe does not embarrass Mayberry. Last appearance of Parley Baer as Mayor Stoner.
84	21	"Opie and the Spoiled Kid"	Bob Sweeney	Jim Fritzell & Everett Greenbaum	February 18, 1963	13.84
A spoiled kid gives Opie bad advice about how Opie should manipulate Andy to get what he wants.
85	22	"The Great Filling Station Robbery"	Bob Sweeney	Harvey Bullock	February 25, 1963	15.54
Andy gets a troubled youth a job at Wally's Filling Station, but wonders if he made the right choice when items start disappearing from the store.
86	23	"Andy Discovers America"	Bob Sweeney	John Whedon	March 4, 1963	16.09
Andy's advice to Opie and his schoolmates about history homework gets him in trouble with the new schoolteacher, Helen Crump (Aneta Corsaut), so he tells Opie and his friends a story about Paul Revere's ride to resolve the situation.
87	24	"Aunt Bee's Medicine Man"	Bob Sweeney	John Whedon	March 11, 1963	15.69
Aunt Bee is charmed by "Indian Elixer" (really disguised moonshine) salesman Col. Harvey (John Dehner). Andy struggles with how to run him out of town without hurting Aunt Bee's feelings.
88	25	"The Darlings Are Coming"	Bob Sweeney	Everett Greenbaum & Jim Fritzell	March 18, 1963	14.89
Andy has his hands full when a musical hillbilly family called the Darlings (Denver Pyle, Maggie Peterson, The Dillards) comes to Mayberry. Things become worse when the only daughter, Charlene, falls for Andy, as her father has betrothed her to another man.
89	26	"Andy's English Valet"	Bob Sweeney	Harvey Bullock	March 25, 1963	16.18
English tourist Malcolm Merriweather (Bernard Fox), a "gentleman's gentleman", goes to work as Andy's valet to pay his traffic fine.
90	27	"Barney's First Car"	Bob Sweeney	Jim Fritzell & Everett Greenbaum	April 1, 1963	15.14
Barney spends his three hundred dollars' worth of life savings on a car from the elderly Mrs. Lesch (Ellen Corby), only to find out he's been hustled.
91	28	"The Rivals"	Bob Sweeney	Harvey Bullock	April 8, 1963	15.54
Opie has a crush on his schoolmate Karen, so Barney tries to teach Opie about women, until Opie ends up "dating" Thelma Lou.
92	29	"A Wife for Andy"	Bob Sweeney	Aaron Ruben	April 15, 1963	14.99
Barney tries to set up Andy with a potential wife, having a crowd of puzzled, single women come to Andy's home one evening, but Andy has his mind on Helen Crump.
93	30	"Dogs, Dogs, Dogs"	Bob Sweeney	Everett Greenbaum & Jim Fritzell	April 22, 1963	N/A
A pack of stray dogs comes into the courthouse, causing problems just as a state official is visiting.
94	31	"Mountain Wedding"	Bob Sweeney	Jim Fritzell & Everett Greenbaum	April 29, 1963	14.99
The Darlings ask Andy to help them deal with wild mountain man Ernest T. Bass (Howard Morris), who wants to stop Charlene Darling and Dud Wash from getting married. First episode with Ernest T. Bass. Only episode with both Bass and the Darlings. Hoke Howell plays Dud. Dub Taylor plays the preacher who performs the wedding.
95	32	"The Big House"	Bob Sweeney	Harvey Bullock	May 6, 1963	14.79
Barney and Gomer are in charge of guarding two criminals out of a gang of four, while Andy is out pursuing the other two. George Kennedy plays a state police detective.

=== Season 4 (1963–64) ===
No. overall	No. in season	Title	Directed by	Written by	Original release date	Viewers (millions)
96	1	"Opie the Birdman"	Dick Crenna	Harvey Bullock	September 30, 1963	14.11
Opie accidentally kills a mother bird with his new slingshot, and decides to care for the three baby birds left behind. In 1997, TV Guide ranked this episode #24 on its list of the 100 Greatest Episodes. In 2009, it moved to No. 18.
97	2	"The Haunted House"	Earl Bellamy	Harvey Bullock	October 7, 1963	13.54
Andy, Barney and Gomer go into the old abandoned Rimshaw House to retrieve a baseball, and discover the truth behind the house's ghostly reputation.
98	3	"Ernest T. Bass Joins the Army"	Dick Crenna	Jim Fritzell & Everett Greenbaum	October 14, 1963	11.85
Ernest T. Bass tries to enlist in the Army so he can get a uniform to impress his girlfriend. When he's rejected, he takes it out on Mayberry.
99	4	"The Sermon for Today"	Dick Crenna	John Whedon	October 21, 1963	12.72
A visiting preacher (David Lewis) encourages the congregation to relax and enjoy life – which is not as easy as they thought, as they frantically rehearse the town's out-of-tune band and try to repair the broken bandstand and worn uniforms.
100	5	"Briscoe Declares for Aunt Bee"	Earl Bellamy	Everett Greenbaum & Jim Fritzell	October 28, 1963	12.88
Briscoe Darling, after enjoying a hearty meal and music session at the Taylors, proposes marriage to Aunt Bee. When she won't accept his repeated advances, he kidnaps her.
101	6	"Gomer the House Guest"	Earl Bellamy	Jim Fritzell & Everett Greenbaum	November 4, 1963	14.21
Gomer is fired from Wally's Filling Station and moves in with the Taylors. Customers then drive into the Taylors' yard at all hours to have Gomer diagnose their cars' problems, disturbing the Taylors' sleep.
102	7	"A Black Day for Mayberry"	Jeffrey Hayden	John Whedon	November 11, 1963	14.21
A gold shipment is coming through Mayberry and Barney accidentally leaks the news, causing a crowd to turn out to welcome the armored car. Ron Howard's (Opie) real father appears as one of the Treasury Agents.
103	8	"Opie's Ill-Gotten Gain"	Jeffrey Hayden	John Whedon	November 18, 1963	14.93
Andy rewards Opie with a new bicycle for his perfect grades, which then turn out to be a grading mistake.
104	9	"Up in Barney's Room"	Jeffrey Hayden	Jim Fritzell & Everett Greenbaum	December 2, 1963	15.18
Despite a longstanding friendship with his sweet elderly landlady Mrs. Mendelbright (Enid Markey), Barney is evicted for cooking in his room. He soon finds Mrs. Mendelbright is under the influence of a con man (J. Pat O'Malley) .
105	10	"A Date for Gomer"	Dick Crenna	Everett Greenbaum & Jim Fritzell	December 9, 1963	14.67
Barney sets Gomer up with Thelma Lou's homely, shy cousin as a date for a dance. This episode, originally scheduled for November 25, was pre-empted due to CBS News' extended coverage of President John F. Kennedy's assassination and funeral.
106	11	"Citizen's Arrest"	Dick Crenna	Everett Greenbaum & Jim Fritzell	December 16, 1963	14.62
Barney gives Gomer a ticket for making a U-turn, then the tables are turned when Gomer "arrests" Barney for the same violation.
107	12	"Opie and His Merry Men"	Dick Crenna	John Whedon	December 30, 1963	14.52
Opie and his friends play Robin Hood and his Merry Men, when they steal food from their parents to give to a hobo (Douglas Fowley).
108	13	"Barney and the Cave Rescue"	Dick Crenna	Harvey Bullock	January 6, 1964	15.13
Barney is mocked by the town for doing his duty too zealously. When Andy and Helen are trapped in a mine, they find their way out the back, but learn Barney has mounted a full-scale rescue and secretly return to save Barney further humiliation.
109	14	"Andy and Opie's Pal"	Dick Crenna	Harvey Bullock	January 13, 1964	15.03
Opie gets jealous when Andy pays extra attention to Opie's new friend Trey Bowden (David Alan Bailey) .
110	15	"Aunt Bee the Crusader"	Coby Ruskin	John Whedon	January 20, 1964	15.39
Aunt Bee leads a ladies' protest against Andy and Barney when a chicken farmer is about to be evicted to make way for a new highway. They are shocked, however, when Mr. Frisby (Charles Lane), the evictee they are sympathetic for, is found to be a moonshiner.
111	16	"Barney's Sidecar"	Coby Ruskin	Jim Fritzell & Everett Greenbaum	January 27, 1964	15.90
Barney gets a motorcycle for the Sheriff's Department and finds many uses for it.
112	17	"My Fair Ernest T. Bass"	Earl Bellamy	Everett Greenbaum & Jim Fritzell	February 3, 1964	17.03
Andy tries to turn wild hillbilly Ernest T. Bass into a sophisticated gentleman, taking him to a society party.
113	18	"Prisoner of Love"	Earl Bellamy	Harvey Bullock	February 10, 1964	16.26
An attractive female jewel thief (Susan Oliver) attempts to seduce Andy and Barney so she can escape from the Mayberry jail.
114	19	"Hot Rod Otis"	Earl Bellamy	Harvey Bullock	February 17, 1964	14.77
Otis, the town drunk, has Andy and Barney worried when he buys a car.
115	20	"The Song Festers"	Earl Bellamy	Jim Fritzell & Everett Greenbaum	February 24, 1964	15.18
Barney's pride is hurt when he is replaced in the town choir by Gomer, who is discovered to have a beautiful singing voice. Andy Griffith's wife had a cameo in this episode.
116	21	"The Shoplifters"	Coby Ruskin	Bill Idelson & Sam Bobrick	March 2, 1964	15.70
Barney goes undercover as a mannequin to find a shoplifter at Weaver's Department Store.
117	22	"Andy's Vacation"	Jeffrey Hayden	Everett Greenbaum & Jim Fritzell	March 9, 1964	17.34
Andy takes a vacation at home, leaving Barney and Gomer in charge of the courthouse. They then continually pester Andy for help with problems that arise.
118	23	"Andy Saves Gomer"	Jeffrey Hayden	Harvey Bullock	March 16, 1964	16.26
Gomer is overly grateful to Andy for putting out a fire at Wally's, and pesters Andy by wanting to help him in gratitude. Howard McNear returns as Floyd, after suffering a stroke during the third season.
119	24	"Bargain Day"	Jeffrey Hayden	John Whedon	March 23, 1964	15.29
Aunt Bee buys a 150-pound side of beef at a discount market, but the Taylors' old freezer (also a "bargain") doesn't work. However, she refuses to call the handyman because he is "too expensive".
120	25	"Divorce, Mountain Style"	Jeffrey Hayden	Jim Fritzell & Everett Greenbaum	March 30, 1964	16.88
After an argument, Charlene Darling Wash impulsively leaves Dud (Bob Denver) and determines to marry Andy, forcing Andy and Barney to simulate "supernatural interference" to drive Charlene back to Dud.
121	26	"A Deal Is a Deal"	Jeffrey Hayden	Bill Idelson & Sam Bobrick	April 6, 1964	17.24
Opie and his friends get involved in a deal to sell salve door-to-door. Barney and Gomer pose as a veterinarian and Opie's father to try to get the distributors to buy the salve back from the boys.
122	27	"Fun Girls"	Coby Ruskin	Aaron Ruben	April 13, 1964	15.80
Two fun-loving but overbearing women from Mount Pilot cause problems by being amorous to Andy and Barney, which makes Helen and Thelma Lou needlessly jealous. First appearance of Goober (George Lindsey). Only episode with both Goober and Gomer together.
123	28	"The Return of Malcolm Merriweather"	Coby Ruskin	Harvey Bullock	April 20, 1964	N/A
Malcolm Merriweather returns to Mayberry, doing housework and cooking for Andy and making Aunt Bee feel unneeded.
124	29	"The Rumor"	Coby Ruskin	Everett Greenbaum & Jim Fritzell	April 27, 1964	N/A
Barney starts a rumor that Andy and Helen are engaged after he sees them kissing in a jewelry store. He then holds a surprise party for the bewildered couple.
125	30	"Barney and Thelma Lou, Phfftt"	Coby Ruskin	Bill Idelson & Sam Bobrick	May 4, 1964	N/A
Feeling that Barney takes her for granted, Thelma Lou starts dating Gomer to purposefully make Barney jealous.
126	31	"Back to Nature"	Coby Ruskin	Harvey Bullock	May 11, 1964	N/A
Andy, Barney and Gomer take Opie and his friends on a camping trip, where Barney and Gomer manage to get themselves lost in the woods.
127	32	"Gomer Pyle, U.S.M.C."	Aaron Ruben	Aaron Ruben	May 18, 1964	N/A
In this backdoor pilot for the spin-off series Gomer Pyle-USMC, Gomer tells Andy that he has enlisted in the Marines. Gomer reads off a list of prominent Marines including a General Lucius Pyle. Gomer tells Andy he has to report the next day. Andy warns Gomer how tough it is in the Marines. Andy offers to drop Gomer off at the base. Andy and Gomer arrive late to the base. Sergeant Vince Carter (Frank Sutton) is going through roll call and notices Gomer isn't there. Gomer explains why they were late and Carter assigns him to KP duty. Gomer interrupts Carter and Carter makes him sing with a bucket on his head. In the barracks, Andy checks up on Gomer from a window. Gomer gets in trouble. Carter tells the men about an inspection coming up. One of the men (Eddie Ryder) pulls a practical joke on Gomer and gets him to wear Carter's Dress Blue uniform. Andy finds Gomer sitting alone in the barracks with a bucket on his head. Andy tells Gomer it will get tougher in the Marines. In a bar, Andy hears Carter telling some other officers about Gomer and about how Gomer won't last. Andy leads Carter to believe that Gomer is General Lucius Pyle's son. Carter now works extra hard to make sure Gomer passes the inspection. Colonel Watson (Frank Albertson) comes by and Gomer passes the inspection. Carter learns from Watson that Lucius doesn't have a son. Karl Lukas as Sergeant. Dick Tyler as Private Hemsley.

=== Season 5 (1964–65) ===
No. overall	No. in season	Title	Directed by	Written by	Original release date	Viewers (millions)
128	1	"Opie Loves Helen"	Aaron Ruben	Bob Ross	September 21, 1964	12.20
Opie develops a crush on Helen and wants to buy a gift for her.
129	2	"Barney's Physical"	Howard Morris	Bob Ross	September 28, 1964	13.52
Andy and Aunt Bee help Barney hurriedly grow to meet the new Civil Service height and weight requirements for law enforcement officers.
130	3	"Family Visit"	Howard Morris	Jim Fritzell & Everett Greenbaum	October 5, 1964	12.99
Aunt Bee's sister and her overbearing, obnoxious family come to visit from out of state. James Westerfield and Maudie Prickett guest star.
131	4	"The Education of Ernest T. Bass"	Alan Rafkin	Everett Greenbaum & Jim Fritzell	October 12, 1964	13.89
Ernest T. Bass tries to earn his diploma after his girl calls him illiterate. His antics badly disrupt Helen's classroom.
132	5	"Aunt Bee's Romance"	Howard Morris	Harvey Bullock	October 19, 1964	14.31
Aunt Bee resumes her romance with an old flame, Roger Hanover (Wallace Ford) – a practical joker with a suspicious background.
133	6	"Barney's Bloodhound"	Howard Morris	Bill Idelson & Sam Bobrick	October 26, 1964	14.25
Barney tries using a dog to catch an escaped convict.
134	7	"Man in the Middle"	Alan Rafkin	Gus Adrian & David Evans	November 2, 1964	12.41
Andy tries to settle a lovers' quarrel between Barney and Thelma Lou, only to get himself and Helen caught in the middle.
135	8	"Barney's Uniform"	Coby Ruskin	Bill Idelson & Sam Bobrick	November 9, 1964	14.04
Barney starts wearing his uniform all the time, after a grocery employee, Fred (Allan Melvin) threatens to beat him up the next time he sees him in plain clothes.
136	9	"Opie's Fortune"	Coby Ruskin	Ben Joelson & Art Baer	November 16, 1964	14.78
Opie finds a wallet containing $50 and must wait one week to see if anyone claims it - if not, the money is his.
137	10	"Goodbye, Sheriff Taylor"	Gene Nelson	Fred Freeman & Lawrence J. Cohen	November 23, 1964	15.25
Andy makes Barney acting Sheriff when he goes to Raleigh for a job interview.
138	11	"The Pageant"	Gene Nelson	Harvey Bullock	November 30, 1964	13.62
Aunt Bee gets the lead in the Mayberry Centennial Pageant, but she proves to be a terrible actress.
139	12	"The Darling Baby"	Howard Morris	Jim Fritzell & Everett Greenbaum	December 7, 1964	15.52
The Darlings choose Opie as the future husband of Charlene's baby girl and insist that Andy sign a marriage contract.
140	13	"Andy and Helen Have Their Day"	Howard Morris	Bill Idelson & Sam Bobrick	December 14, 1964	14.99
Andy and Helen try to have a nice private picnic, but Barney keeps interrupting them.
141	14	"Three Wishes for Opie"	Howard Morris	Richard M. Powell	December 21, 1964	N/A
Barney buys fortune-telling paraphernalia that seem to really grant wishes, and tests their power by asking Opie to make three wishes.
142	15	"Otis Sues the County"	Howard Morris	Bob Ross	December 28, 1964	14.83
Otis is talked by an unscrupulous lawyer (Jay Novello) into suing the county after he suffers a fall in the Mayberry jail. Ironically, Otis had thought the fall trifling until Barney insisted he fill out an injury form.
143	16	"Barney Fife, Realtor"	Peter Baldwin	Bill Idelson & Sam Bobrick	January 4, 1965	15.46
Barney decides to sell real estate as his second job and tries to get Andy to sell his house.
144	17	"Goober Takes a Car Apart"	Peter Baldwin	Bill Idelson & Sam Bobrick	January 11, 1965	16.36
After Andy puts Goober in charge of the courthouse, he dismantles a car and rebuilds it inside the courthouse.
145	18	"The Rehabilitation of Otis"	Peter Baldwin	Lawrence J. Cohen & Fred Freeman	January 18, 1965	16.52
Barney tries to cure Otis of his drinking habit.
146	19	"The Lucky Letter"	Theodore J. Flicker	Richard M. Powell	January 25, 1965	15.67
Barney thinks he's received bad luck after tearing up a chain letter.
147	20	"Goober and the Art of Love"	Alan Rafkin	Fred Freeman & Lawrence J. Cohen	February 1, 1965	17.15
Andy and Barney get Goober to ask out wallflower Lydia Crosswaithe (Josie Lloyd) so he doesn't have to tag along on their dates.
148	21	"Barney Runs for Sheriff"	Alan Rafkin	Richard M. Powell	February 8, 1965	15.57
Barney ends up running against Andy for Sheriff when a new job offer for Andy falls through.
149	22	"If I Had a Quarter-Million"	Alan Rafkin	Bob Ross	February 15, 1965	15.67
Barney finds $250,000 from a recent bank robbery and sets out to catch the culprit.
150	23	"TV or Not TV"	Coby Ruskin	Art Baer & Ben Joelson	March 1, 1965	16.67
Three crooks posing as TV producers attempt to take advantage of Mayberry's "Sheriff Without a Gun" by robbing the bank. Gavin MacLeod played one of the crooks. In a season 6 episode ("Taylors in Hollywood"), MacLeod played an actor playing Andy in a movie based on "Sheriff Without a Gun".
151	24	"Guest in the House"	Coby Ruskin	Lawrence J. Cohen & Fred Freeman	March 8, 1965	15.89
Helen gets unnecessarily jealous of a pretty girl (Jan Shutan), a friend of the Taylor family who is staying with them for a few days after an argument and break-up with her fiancé.
152	25	"The Case of the Punch in the Nose"	Coby Ruskin	Bill Idelson & Sam Bobrick	March 15, 1965	14.52
Barney discovers a file of an old forgotten assault case between Floyd and grocer Charles Foley (Frank Ferguson) that was never resolved. Barney reopens the case and his insistence on following through with the case causes old feelings to flare up as Mayberry divides into rival camps.
153	26	"Opie's Newspaper"	Coby Ruskin	Harvey Bullock	March 22, 1965	14.47
Opie publishes local gossip in his newspaper, embarrassing Andy, Barney and Aunt Bee who had made unflattering comments about fellow townspeople.
154	27	"Aunt Bee's Invisible Beau"	Theodore J. Flicker	Ben Joelson & Art Baer	March 29, 1965	14.94
Aunt Bee invents a story that the butter and egg man (Woodrow Chambliss) is her new boyfriend....but he happens to be married.
155	28	"The Arrest of the Fun Girls"	Theodore J. Flicker	Richard M. Powell	April 5, 1965	14.73
The Fun Girls get themselves arrested on purpose, once again disrupting the romantic lives of Andy and Barney when Helen and Thelma Lou become unnecessarily jealous after discovering them at the courthouse at night with the girls.
156	29	"The Luck of Newton Monroe"	Coby Ruskin	Bill Idelson & Sam Bobrick	April 12, 1965	14.41
A peddler (Don Rickles) keeps having bad luck, and Andy and Barney try to help.
157	30	"Opie Flunks Arithmetic"	Coby Ruskin	Richard Morgan	April 19, 1965	N/A
Opie needs to improve in his arithmetic, and Andy gets pressure from Barney to help him. Last appearance of Barney Fife as a regular character.
158	31	"Opie and the Carnival"	Coby Ruskin	Fred Freeman & Lawrence J. Cohen	April 26, 1965	N/A
Opie tries to win a birthday present for Andy at a carnival, unaware that the shooting gallery is a scam.
159	32	"Banjo-Playing Deputy"	Coby Ruskin	Bob Ross	May 3, 1965	N/A
Andy hires a shy, timid carnival banjo player (Jerry Van Dyke) as a temporary deputy.

== Color episodes (1965–1968) ==
=== Season 6 (1965–66) ===
No. overall	No. in season	Title	Directed by	Written by	Original release date	Viewers (millions)
160	1	"Opie's Job"	Larry Dobkin	Art Baer & Ben Joelson	September 13, 1965	12.43
Opie wins a competition for a grocery delivery job, then gives it up to his competitor who needs the job a lot more.
161	2	"Andy's Rival"	Peter Baldwin	Laurence Marks	September 20, 1965	13.13
Andy gets jealous of a handsome new teacher Frank Smith (Charles Aidman) spending time working with Helen.
162	3	"Malcolm at the Crossroads"	Gary Nelson	Harvey Bullock	September 27, 1965	13.18
Malcolm Merriweather replaces Ernest T. Bass as school crossing guard, and Ernest T. wants to fight Malcolm to get even. Last appearance of both Malcolm Merriweather and Ernest T. Bass.
163	4	"Aunt Bee, the Swinger"	Larry Dobkin	Jack Elinson	October 4, 1965	N/A
Aunt Bee and her new beau John Canfield (Charles Ruggles), a recently retired Congressman, attempt to recapture their youth.
164	5	"The Bazaar"	Sheldon Leonard	Ben Joelson & Art Baer	October 11, 1965	13.23
Andy's new deputy, Warren Ferguson (Jack Burns), Floyd's nephew, arrests Aunt Bee and her friends for "gambling" at the church bazaar.
165	6	"A Warning from Warren"	Alan Rafkin	Lawrence J. Cohen & Fred Freeman	October 18, 1965	13.40
Warren, who thinks he has ESP, believes a picnic will not go so well for Andy and Helen.
166	7	"Off to Hollywood"	Alan Rafkin	Bill Idelson & Sam Bobrick	October 25, 1965	14.04
The Taylors decide to take a trip to Hollywood after Andy is given a check from a studio that wants to make his life story into a movie.
167	8	"Taylors in Hollywood"	Alan Rafkin	Bill Idelson & Sam Bobrick	November 1, 1965	15.98
The Taylors visit the studio where Andy's biopic, Sheriff Without a Gun, is being filmed. Gavin MacLeod plays the actor portraying Andy in the movie.
168	9	"The Hollywood Party"	Alan Rafkin	Lawrence J. Cohen & Fred Freeman	November 8, 1965	13.34
Andy poses with a Hollywood starlet, Darlene Mason (Ruta Lee), jeopardizing his relationship with Helen.
169	10	"Aunt Bee on TV"	Alan Rafkin	Fred Freeman & Lawrence J. Cohen	November 15, 1965	15.23
While in Hollywood, Aunt Bee wins several new appliances on a TV quiz show, but when she returns home she loses her friends as a result. William Christopher plays the IRS agent who visits the Taylors to collect taxes on the prizes.
170	11	"The Cannon"	Alan Rafkin	Jack Elinson	November 22, 1965	14.04
Through sheer luck, Warren catches a pair of art thieves with his supposed "knowledge" of cannons.
171	12	"A Man's Best Friend"	Alan Rafkin	Art Baer & Ben Joelson	November 29, 1965	12.64
Opie and his friend Tommy (Michel Petit) use walkie-talkies to fool Goober into thinking he really has a talking dog.
172	13	"Aunt Bee Takes a Job"	Alan Rafkin	Bill Idelson & Sam Bobrick	December 6, 1965	13.93
Aunt Bee gets a job at the print shop where her employers turn out to be counterfeiters.
173	14	"The Church Organ"	Lee Philips	Paul Wayne	December 13, 1965	13.23
Andy starts a fundraising drive to help the church buy a new organ, but problems arise when church members go back on their pledges.
174	15	"Girl-Shy"	Lee Philips	Bill Idelson & Sam Bobrick	December 20, 1965	N/A
Warren becomes a sleepwalking Casanova, pursuing Helen after watching his suave hero on TV.
175	16	"Otis the Artist"	Alan Rafkin	Story by : Bob Ross; Teleplay by : Fred Freeman & Lawrence J. Cohen	January 3, 1966	15.12
Warren tries to get Otis to start a career in art.
176	17	"The Return of Barney Fife"	Alan Rafkin	Sam Bobrick & Bill Idelson	January 10, 1966	16.95
Barney Fife returns to Mayberry for a high school reunion and so does Thelma Lou, who has recently married someone else. This is Thelma Lou's final appearance on the series.
177	18	"The Legend of Barney Fife"	Alan Rafkin	Harvey Bullock	January 17, 1966	15.87
Barney has to demonstrate his "legendary courage" to Warren when Avery Noonan (Ted White) a vengeful convict escapes from prison.
178	19	"Lost and Found"	Alan Rafkin	John L. Greene & Paul David	January 24, 1966	14.53
Aunt Bee collects insurance money for the loss of her jeweled pin, then finds it after she spends the money on a garbage disposer. Jack Dodson, later cast as Howard Sprague, makes his first appearance in the series as insurance man Ed Jenkins.
179	20	"Wyatt Earp Rides Again"	Alan Rafkin	Jack Elinson	January 31, 1966	14.96
Clarence Earp (Richard Jury), a supposed descendant of Wyatt Earp, comes to Mayberry with Wild West show promoter Fred Gibson (Pat Hingle). Last appearance of Warren Ferguson.
180	21	"Aunt Bee Learns to Drive"	Lee Philips	Jack Elinson	February 7, 1966	13.99
Andy has a big problem when Aunt Bee buys a car and takes driving lessons from Goober.
181	22	"Look Paw, I'm Dancing"	Lee Philips	Ben Starr	February 14, 1966	14.74
Opie learns to enjoy his first dance party.
182	23	"The Gypsies"	Alan Rafkin	Roland MacLane	February 21, 1966	15.33
A band of gypsies causes trouble for Andy with their supposed magic and weather predicting abilities. Jamie Farr and Vito Scotti played two of the gypsies.
183	24	"Eat Your Heart Out"	Alan Rafkin	Art Baer & Ben Joelson	February 28, 1966	15.33
Goober falls for Flora, the diner's new waitress (Alberta Nelson), but she has her eye on Andy.
184	25	"A Baby in the House"	Alan Rafkin	Bill Idelson & Sam Bobrick	March 7, 1966	15.06
Aunt Bee agrees to babysit her niece for a week, but the infant doesn't seem to like her.
185	26	"The County Clerk"	Alan Rafkin	Bill Idelson & Sam Bobrick	March 14, 1966	15.60
Andy and Helen try to set up county clerk Howard Sprague (Jack Dodson) with Irene Fairchild (Nina Shipman), the new county nurse.
186	27	"The Foster Lady"	Alan Rafkin	Jack Elinson & Iz Elinson	March 21, 1966	15.76
Aunt Bee is picked to star in a TV commercial for furniture polish.
187	28	"Goober's Replacement"	Alan Rafkin	Stan Dreben & Howard Merrill	March 28, 1966	14.58
Goober's girlfriend Flora fills in for him at Wally's and attracts a long line of male customers.
188	29	"The Battle of Mayberry"	Alan Rafkin	Paul David & John L. Greene	April 4, 1966	11.84
Opie causes an uproar when he discovers and publishes the truth about the Battle of Mayberry.
189	30	"A Singer in Town"	Alan Rafkin	Stan Dreben & Howard Merrill	April 11, 1966	14.20
Rock-n'-Roll singer Keevy Hazelton (Jesse Pearson) performs a song about Mayberry written by Aunt Bee and Clara Edwards.

=== Season 7 (1966–67) ===
No. overall	No. in season	Title	Directed by	Written by	Original release date	Viewers (millions)
190	1	"Opie's Girlfriend"	Lee Philips	Budd Grossman	September 12, 1966	13.12
Opie makes friends with Helen's niece Cynthia, who is athletically superior to him.
191	2	"The Lodge"	Lee Philips	Jim Parker & Arnold Margolin	September 19, 1966	13.89
Howard applies for membership in the Mayberry men's lodge, but is blackballed when his controlling mother (Mabel Albertson) interferes.
192	3	"The Barbershop Quartet"	Lee Philips	Fred S. Fox	September 26, 1966	12.90
A prisoner (Hamilton Camp) replaces Howard as tenor in the Mayberry barbershop quartet.
193	4	"The Ball Game"	Lee Philips	Story by : Rance Howard; Teleplay by : Sid Morse	October 3, 1966	14.33
Andy reluctantly agrees to umpire an important youth league baseball game between Mayberry and Mount Pilot, in which Opie is playing.
194	5	"Aunt Bee's Crowning Glory"	Lee Philips	Ronald Axe	October 10, 1966	14.60
Aunt Bee wears a blonde wig to impress a visiting pastor (Ian Wolfe) .
195	6	"The Darling Fortune"	Lee Philips	Arnold Margolin & Jim Parker	October 17, 1966	15.26
The Darlings come into a windfall of $300, so they stop by Mayberry to find brides for Briscoe's sons. Last appearance of the Darlings.
196	7	"Mind Over Matter"	Lee Philips	Ron Friedman & Pat McCormick	October 31, 1966	13.12
Goober is convinced he has whiplash, so he acts like an invalid, making Andy's family care for him.
197	8	"Politics Begin at Home"	Lee Philips	Fred S. Fox	November 7, 1966	14.16
Aunt Bee runs against Howard for city council, then withdraws during a debate after realizing Howard has more expertise with the issues. (This storyline was also used in episode 143 of the Dick Van Dyke Show, and later in episode 72 of the Partridge Family Show).
198	9	"The Senior Play"	Lee Philips	Sid Morse	November 14, 1966	13.73
Helen and her teenage students try to put on a play, but the principal objects over its content.
199	10	"Opie Finds a Baby"	Lee Philips	Stan Dreben & Sid Mandel	November 21, 1966	13.51
Opie and his friend Arnold find an abandoned baby and try to find him a home. Jack Nicholson plays the baby's father.
200	11	"Big Fish in a Small Town"	Lee Philips	Bill Idelson & Sam Bobrick	November 28, 1966	15.32
Howard is the envy of Mayberry when he catches "Old Sam", a famously elusive silver carp in Tucker's Lake on his very first fishing trip.
201	12	"Only a Rose"	Lee Philips	Jim Parker & Arnold Margolin	December 5, 1966	13.29
Opie accidentally destroys Aunt Bee's special rose just before the annual Mayberry flower show.
202	13	"Otis the Deputy"	Lee Philips	Jim Parker & Arnold Margolin	December 12, 1966	14.99
Otis and Howard take action to rescue Andy from a pair of bank robbers. Last appearance of Otis.
203	14	"Goober Makes History"	Lee Philips	John L. Greene & Paul David	December 19, 1966	N/A
Goober fancies himself a philosopher when he joins a night class and grows a beard.
204	15	"A New Doctor in Town"	Lee Philips	Ray Brenner & Barry E. Blitzer	December 26, 1966	13.29
The citizens of Mayberry are skeptical of the town's youthful new doctor (William Christopher). Andy convinces them to give him a chance, but then has misgivings of his own when Opie gets sick.
205	16	"Don't Miss a Good Bet"	Lee Philips	Fred S. Fox	January 2, 1967	15.04
George Jones (Roger Perry), a man claiming to have a map to a legendary lost treasure, convinces Mayberry's citizens to invest in his operation.
206	17	"Dinner at Eight"	Lee Philips	Budd Grossman	January 9, 1967	15.48
Due to communication failures, Andy has to endure three spaghetti dinners in one evening.
207	18	"A Visit to Barney Fife"	Lee Philips	Bill Idelson & Sam Bobrick	January 16, 1967	17.46
Andy visits Barney in Raleigh and helps him solve a rash of supermarket robberies.
208	19	"Barney Comes to Mayberry"	Lee Philips	Sid Morse	January 23, 1967	16.25
Barney returns to Mayberry at the same time as an old girlfriend turned Hollywood actress, whose movie is having its world premiere in town.
209	20	"Andy's Old Girlfriend"	Lee Philips	Sid Morse	January 30, 1967	16.52
Alice Harper (Joanna McNeil), an old girlfriend of Andy's, comes back to Mayberry, putting a strain on his relationship with Helen.
210	21	"Aunt Bee's Restaurant"	Lee Philips	Ronald Axe & Les Roberts	February 6, 1967	15.48
Aunt Bee becomes a partner in a new Chinese restaurant, but her superstitions make her question her investment.
211	22	"Floyd's Barbershop"	Lee Philips	Jim Parker & Arnold Margolin	February 13, 1967	14.88
Floyd angrily decides to leave his barbershop after Howard buys the building and raises the rent.
212	23	"The Statue"	Lee Philips	Fred S. Fox	February 20, 1967	15.43
Andy discovers that his ancestor was the biggest swindler in the state just as Mayberry is about to unveil a statue of him.
213	24	"Helen, the Authoress"	Lee Philips	Doug Tibbles	February 27, 1967	16.20
Helen becomes a successful author of children's books, but Andy has a difficult time with her new-found celebrity.
214	25	"Goodbye Dolly"	Lee Philips	Michael Morris & Seaman Jacobs	March 6, 1967	15.81
When a dairy company plans to replace their horse-drawn delivery wagon with a modern truck, Opie takes on the job of caring for the horse.
215	26	"Opie's Piano Lesson"	Lee Philips	Leo & Pauline Townsend	March 13, 1967	15.70
Opie decides to take up the piano, but piano practice soon conflicts with his football practice. Note: this is the first episode to feature a black actor (Rockne Tarkington) in a speaking role.
216	27	"Howard, the Comedian"	Lee Philips	Michael Morris & Seaman Jacobs	March 20, 1967	15.54
Howard appears on a local TV amateur hour and tells jokes about his friends in Mayberry, which they take as insults.
217	28	"Big Brother"	Lee Philips	Fred S. Fox	March 27, 1967	16.31
Howard volunteers to be a Big Brother of a high school student, but neglects tutoring the boy while taking a romantic interest in the boy's older sister.
218	29	"Opie's Most Unforgettable Character"	Lee Philips	Michael Morris & Seaman Jacobs	April 3, 1967	15.37
Opie tries to pick a subject for his writing assignment and eventually picks someone other than Andy.
219	30	"Goober's Contest"	Lee Philips	Ron Friedman & Pat McCormick	April 10, 1967	15.70
Goober gets into trouble when a printing error awards Floyd with an overly large cash prize in a filling station contest. Last appearance of Floyd. Rob Reiner had a small role in the episode. Halfway through the program, when Goober is talking to Floyd at the outside gas pumps, a hut from the TV show Gomer Pyle, U.S.M.C. is clearly visible.

=== Season 8 (1967–68) ===
No. overall	No. in season	Title	Directed by	Written by	Original release date	Viewers (millions)
220	1	"Opie's First Love"	Lee Philips	Doug Tibbles	September 11, 1967	14.28
Mary Alice Carter (Morgan Brittany) accepts Opie's invitation to a party, then decides to go with another boy she likes better.
221	2	"Howard the Bowler"	Lee Philips	Dick Bensfield & Perry Grant	September 18, 1967	13.83
Howard is a last-minute substitute on Emmett's bowling team, but he comes within one strike of a perfect game before the lights go out. First appearance of Emmett Clark (Paul Hartman).
222	3	"A Trip to Mexico"	Lee Philips	Dick Bensfield & Perry Grant	September 25, 1967	14.73
Aunt Bee wins a trip to Mexico and takes along her two closest friends....but they don't get along.
223	4	"Andy's Trip to Raleigh"	Lee Philips	Joseph Bonaduce	October 2, 1967	14.45
Andy must cancel a date with Helen to meet with a lawyer named Lee (Whitney Blake) in Raleigh, who's actually a very attractive woman.
224	5	"Opie Steps Up in Class"	Lee Philips	Joseph Bonaduce	October 9, 1967	13.94
Opie makes friends with a boy from a rich family at summer camp, leading Aunt Bee to try improving the Taylors' social standing.
225	6	"Howard's Main Event"	Lee Philips	Robert C. Dennis & Earl Barret	October 16, 1967	13.78
Howard makes friends with Millie Hutchins (Arlene Golonka), the new girl at the bakery, but her ex-boyfriend, Clyde Plaunt (Allan Melvin) constantly threatens him.
226	7	"Aunt Bee the Juror"	Lee Philips	Kent Wilson	October 23, 1967	17.64
Aunt Bee serves jury duty on a seemingly open-and-shut case of theft. Jack Nicholson plays the defendant.
227	8	"The Tape Recorder"	Lee Philips	Michael Morris & Seaman Jacobs	October 30, 1967	16.07
Opie tape records a bank robber confessing where he hid the stolen money, against Andy's strict orders.
228	9	"Opie's Group"	Lee Philips	Doug Tibbles	November 6, 1967	14.22
Opie joins a rock-and-roll band, which starts to affect his behavior and his grades.
229	10	"Aunt Bee and the Lecturer"	Lee Philips	Michael Morris & Seaman Jacobs	November 13, 1967	14.62
Aunt Bee dates a charming lecturer (Edward Andrews), who is convinced she is the exact image of his late wife.
230	11	"Andy's Investment"	Alan Rafkin	Michael Morris & Seaman Jacobs	November 20, 1967	15.68
Andy starts a coin laundry business to save money for Opie's college education.
231	12	"Howard and Millie"	Peter Baldwin	Joseph Bonaduce	November 27, 1967	17.14
Howard proposes to Millie Hutchins at the bakery. But on the train ride to get married in her West Virginia hometown, they have a series of spats and on arrival in Wheeling decide to break the engagement.
232	13	"Aunt Bee's Cousin"	Lee Philips	Dick Bensfield & Perry Grant	December 4, 1967	14.78
Andy learns the sad truth about Aunt Bee's supposedly wealthy cousin (Jack Albertson), who spins many tall tales during his visit to Mayberry.
233	14	"Suppose Andy Gets Sick"	Peter Baldwin	Jack Raymond	December 11, 1967	13.89
Andy is bedridden with the flu, so Goober acts as deputy to take care of things. Chaos ensues.
234	15	"Howard's New Life"	Lee Philips	Perry Grant & Dick Bensfield	December 18, 1967	N/A
Howard decides to quit his job as county clerk and start a new life on a tiny Caribbean island, only to become incredibly bored.
235	16	"Goober the Executive"	Lee Philips	Michael Morris & Seaman Jacobs	December 25, 1967	13.22
Goober buys the filling station with financial support from Andy and Emmett.
236	17	"The Mayberry Chef"	Lee Philips	James L. Brooks	January 1, 1968	15.12
Aunt Bee gets her own cooking show on a local TV station.
237	18	"Emmett's Brother-in-Law"	Lee Philips	James L. Brooks	January 8, 1968	16.46
Emmett's wife pushes him to be an insurance salesman like his brother-in-law, but he doesn't want to leave his fix-it shop.
238	19	"Opie's Drugstore Job"	Lee Philips	Kent Wilson	January 15, 1968	16.97
Opie gets a job at the drugstore, where he accidentally breaks an expensive bottle of perfume.
239	20	"The Church Benefactors"	Lee Philips	Robert C. Dennis & Earl Barret	January 22, 1968	17.30
Church members debate over whether to spend a $500 gift to the church on choir robes or to fix a drainage problem with the church building.
240	21	"Barney Hosts a Summit Meeting"	Lee Philips	Aaron Ruben	January 29, 1968	18.70
Barney Fife returns to Mayberry and helps arrange a conference between American and Soviet officials at the Taylors' house. The plot was inspired by the actual USA-USSR summit meeting in Glassboro, NJ. The final appearance of Barney Fife on the show. This was the highest rated episode in the history of the series.
241	22	"Goober Goes to an Auto Show"	Lee Philips	Joseph Bonaduce	February 5, 1968	15.34
While attending an auto show in Raleigh, Goober tries to impress an old schoolmate who seems to be financially well-off.
242	23	"Aunt Bee's Big Moment"	Lee Philips	Dick Bensfield & Perry Grant	February 12, 1968	12.71
Aunt Bee takes flying lessons to achieve a big moment like everyone else.
243	24	"Helen's Past"	Lee Philips	Doug Tibbles	February 19, 1968	15.23
Andy discovers that Helen apparently was arrested years ago for associating with a notorious gangster.
244	25	"Emmett's Anniversary"	Lee Philips	Perry Grant & Dick Bensfield	February 26, 1968	14.28
Emmett wants to buy his wife a mink coat for their 25th anniversary.
245	26	"The Wedding"	Lee Philips	Joseph Bonaduce	March 4, 1968	15.40
Howard's controlling mother remarries and moves away, allowing him to turn the Sprague house into a bachelor pad. Teri Garr has a small role.
246	27	"Sam for Town Council"	Lee Philips	Dick Bensfield & Perry Grant	March 11, 1968	15.90
Sam Jones (Ken Berry) is urged by Andy and Howard to run for head of town council - against Emmett.
247	28	"Opie and Mike"	Lee Philips	Doug Tibbles	March 18, 1968	15.74
Opie helps out Sam Jones' son Mike (Buddy Foster) with bullies at school, and Mike starts to tag after him.
248	29	"A Girl for Goober"	Lee Philips	Story by : Bob Ross; Teleplay by : Bruce Howard	March 25, 1968	16.18
Goober tries a computer dating service to find the right girl, and is matched with the PhD graduate who runs it. Maggie Peterson makes an appearance as Sam Jones' date, not as Charlene Darling.
249	30	"Mayberry R.F.D."	Peter Baldwin	Bob Ross	April 1, 1968	17.30
In this set-up for the sequel series, Mayberry R.F.D., Andy runs into Sam at the train station. Sam tells Andy that his friend Mario Vincente (Gabriele Tinti), who he met while stationed in Italy during the war, is coming to help out on the farm. The train arrives, and apparently Mario brought his father and sister Sophia (Letícia Román) along without telling Sam first. Sam reluctantly agrees to let the family stay with him. Sam stops in town to pick up groceries and the family meets Goober and Howard. At the farm, Papa drives Sam's tractor into the barn door, destroying the door. Sam's housekeeper, Mrs. Fletcher (Almira Sessions), is not happy about Sophia being in the kitchen and quits. The family are constantly yelling at each other in Italian and it's driving Sam crazy. Sam tells Andy that there are a lot a farms run by Italians in Siler City and maybe they'd be happier there. Goober tries to teach Papa checkers, but it doesn't go to well. Aunt Bee, Helen and Clara come to meet Sophia and have a nice time. That night Andy takes Sam to the Town Hall meeting. Aunt Bee introduces the Vincente family to the towns people. Mario tells the people how happy they are to be in Mayberry and everyone applauds. Sam is asked to speak and he winds up saying that he knows things will work out with the family staying with him.

== Reunion movie ==
Title	Directed by	Written by	Original release date	Viewers (millions)
Return to Mayberry	Bob Sweeney	Harvey Bullock & Everett Greenbaum	April 13, 1986	28.35
Andy Taylor returns to Mayberry after 18 years to hook back up with old friends, but finds himself in the middle of suspicious events surrounding the sheriff's election.

== Note ==
1. 'David Adler' was a pseudonym for blacklisted writer Frank Tarloff.
