= Bill Quinn =

American actor (1912–1994)

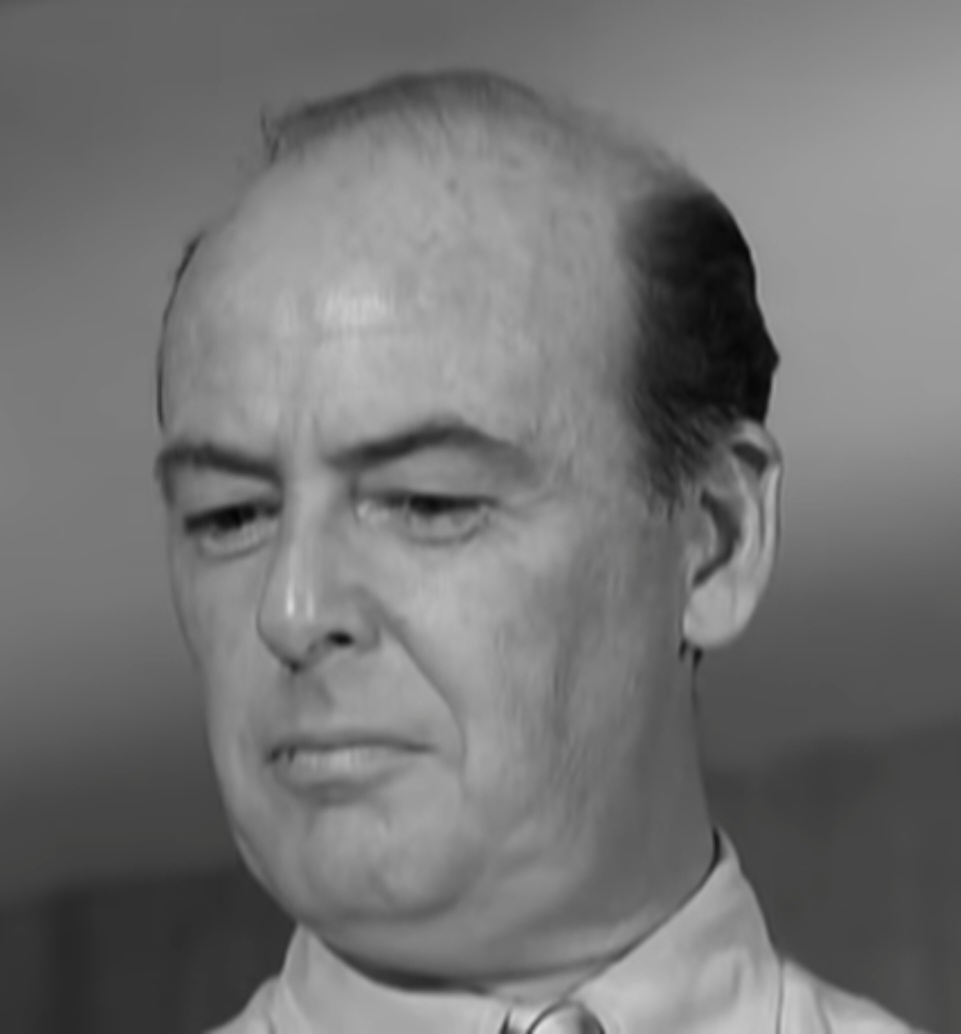
- Quinn in an episode of One Step Beyond (1959)
- Born: William Tyrell Quinn; May 6, 1912; New York City, U.S.
- Died: April 29, 1994 (aged 81); Camarillo, California, U.S.
- Occupation: Actor
- Years active: 1923–1989
- Spouse: Mary Catherine Roden (m. 1939)
- Children: 3
- Relatives: Bob Newhart (son-in-law)

William Tyrell Quinn (May 6, 1912 – April 29, 1994) was an American character actor of film and television.

== Early years ==
Quinn was born on May 6, 1912, in New York City. His father, Edward Quinn, was a supervisor in the United States Shipping Board's copying department. His mother, Lillian Tyrrell, was an actress in films and a chorus girl on Broadway. He performed with his older brothers in a children's act in vaudeville.

== Career ==
As a teenager, Quinn worked in films in New York City. He performed with touring stock theater companies during the 1920s.

Quinn began working on radio around 1934. He starred as a detective on Little Herman on ABC in the late 1940s. Other radio programs on which he appeared included The Man Behind the Gun, Counterspy, The FBI in Peace and War, Gangbusters, and Mr. District Attorney.

A prolific character actor, Quinn appeared in more than 150 roles over seven decades, beginning in silent films during the 1920s and ending with Star Trek V: The Final Frontier in 1989, in which he portrayed the father of Dr. McCoy. On television, he appeared as Mr. Van Ranseleer, the wise, blind bar patron, in Archie Bunker's Place. His other TV roles include The Odd Couple, in the recurring role of Felix and Oscar's dour physician, Dr. Melnitz; The Rifleman as Frank Sweeney, the bartender; and Mary's father in three episodes of The Mary Tyler Moore Show. From the 1950s through the 1980s, Quinn made guest appearances on several other TV series, including Perry Mason, Honey West, My Three Sons, Batman, The Man from U.N.C.L.E., Bewitched, I Dream of Jeannie, Ironside, Hawaii Five-O, Land of the Giants, Adam-12, The Waltons, Quincy, M.E., The Rockford Files, The Bob Newhart Show, Trapper John, M.D. and The Golden Girls. His film appearances include The Birds (1963), The Reluctant Astronaut (1967), The Shakiest Gun in the West (1968), Hearts of the West (1975), Gable and Lombard (1976), Bustin' Loose (1981), and Twilight Zone: The Movie (1983).

== Personal life and death ==
Quinn married Mary Catherine Roden in 1939, and they had three daughters. One of those is Virginia "Ginnie" Quinn Newhart, wife of comedian Bob Newhart, on whose sitcoms Newhart and The Bob Newhart Show Quinn occasionally appeared in small supporting roles.

Quinn died on April 29, 1994, at the age of 81 in Camarillo, California of natural causes. He is buried in San Fernando Mission Cemetery.

== Filmography ==
- No Mother to Guide Her (1923) - Billy Mills, as a child
- The New School Teacher (1924) - Pupil
- The Rifleman (1959) (Season 1, Episode 26: "The Deadly Wait") - Sweeney
- The Last Angry Man (1959) - Andrew Lord (uncredited)
- The Flying Fontaines (1959) - Al Bartlett (uncredited)
- The Mountain Road (1960) - Colonel Magnusson
- From the Terrace (1960) - Lawrence Von Elm (uncredited)
- The Rifleman (1960) (Season 2, Episode 27: "Lariat") - Sweeney
- Alfred Hitchcock Presents (1961) (Season 7 Episode 7: "You Can't Be a Little Girl All Your Life") - Mr. Dutton
- Cry for Happy (1961) - Alan Lyman
- Go Naked in the World (1961) - Pete's Doctor (uncredited)
- The Young Savages (1961) - Police Captain Larsen (uncredited)
- Ada (1961) - Tom De Paul, Committee Man (uncredited)
- Five Finger Exercise (1962) - Salesman
- Advise & Consent (1962) - Senator Paul Hendershot
- The Birds (1963) - Sam, man in Diner
- It Happened at the World's Fair (1963) - Man Leaving Dispensary (uncredited)
- Brainstorm (1965) - Psychiatrist at Sanity Hearing (uncredited)
- Mirage (1965) - Eddie, Bartender (uncredited)
- Dark Intruder (1965) - The Neighbor
- When the Boys Meet the Girls (1965) - Dean of Colby
- Penelope (1966) - Bank Executive (uncredited)
- The Ballad of Josie (1967) - Bobbitt (uncredited)
- Doctor, You've Got to Be Kidding! (1967) - Executive at Meeting (uncredited)
- The Reluctant Astronaut (1967) - Captain Ferguson (uncredited)
- The Shakiest Gun in the West (1968) - U.S. Marshal Arthur Bates (uncredited)
- Love Is a Funny Thing (1969) - Le passager
- How to Frame a Figg (1971) - Assistant Attorney General John Carmoni
- The Mad Bomber (1973) - Sergeant Quinn
- Ace Eli and Rodger of the Skies (1973) - Mortician
- Hearts of the West (1975) - Customer at Cafe Rio (uncredited)
- Psychic Killer (1975) - Hospital Coroner
- Matilda (1978) - Donohue
- Archie Bunker's Place (1979-1983) - Mr. Van Rensalier
- Bustin' Loose (1981) - Judge Antonio Runzuli
- Dead & Buried (1981) - Ernie
- Twilight Zone: The Movie (1983) - Mr. Leo Conroy (Segment#2)
- Lucky Stiff (1988) - Emmet Kassler
- Star Trek V: The Final Frontier (1989) - McCoy's Father (his final film role)
