= Al Checco =

American actor (1921–2015)

- Checco in The Andy Griffith Show (1965)
- Born: July 21, 1921; Pittsburgh, Pennsylvania, U.S.
- Died: July 19, 2015 (aged 93); Studio City, California, U.S.
- Occupation: Actor

Al Checco (July 21, 1921 – July 19, 2015) was an American film, television and theatre actor. Born in Pittsburgh, Pennsylvania, he was known for playing Bernard Stein in the 1968 film The Party.

Checco was the partner of actor Don Knotts when they were performing entertainers in Special Services to soldiers during World War II. He died on July 19, 2015 of natural causes at his home in Studio City, California, at the age of 93.

== Selected filmography ==
- The Incredible Mr. Limpet (1964) - Sailor (uncredited)
- The Ghost and Mr. Chicken (1966) - Gaylord Patie (uncredited)
- Hotel (1967) - Herbie Chandler
- The Reluctant Astronaut (1967) - Man at Console (uncredited)
- P.J. (1968) - Cab Driver (uncredited)
- The Party (1968) - Bernard Stein
- Bullitt (1968) - Desk Clerk
- Angel in My Pocket (1969) - Byron
- There Was a Crooked Man... (1970) - Wheatley (uncredited)
- Adam at 6 A.M. (1970) - (uncredited)
- I Love My Wife (1970) - Dr. Meyerberg
- How to Frame a Figg (1971) - (scenes deleted)
- Skin Game (1971) - Room Clerk
- Glass Houses (1972) - Man Wearing Black Cravat at Civic Meeting
- Get to Know Your Rabbit (1972) - Taxi Driver (uncredited)
- The World's Greatest Athlete (1973) - Dr. Checco
- Extreme Close-Up (1973) - Surveillance Salesman
- Adam-12 (1973) - Mr.Stewart
- The Terminal Man (1974) - Farley
- Alex & the Gypsy (1976) - Nat
- Pete's Dragon (1977) - Fisherman #1
- Zero to Sixty (1978) - The Cook
- How to Beat the High Cost of Living (1980) - Tim Lundy
