= The Ghost and Mr. Chicken =

1966 film by Alan Rafkin

- Theatrical release poster
- Directed by: Alan Rafkin
- Written by: Jim Fritzell; Everett Greenbaum
- Produced by: Edward Montagne
- Starring: Don Knotts; Joan Staley; Liam Redmond; Dick Sargent
- Cinematography: William Margulies
- Edited by: Sam E. Waxman
- Music by: Vic Mizzy
- Color process: Technicolor
- Production company: Universal Pictures
- Distributed by: Universal Pictures
- Release date: January 20, 1966
- Running time: 90 minutes
- Country: United States
- Language: English

The Ghost and Mr. Chicken is a 1966 American comedy horror mystery film starring Don Knotts as Luther Heggs, the town dunce and a newspaper typesetter who spends a night in a haunted house, which is located in the fictitious community of Rachel, Kansas. Don Knotts' first major project after leaving The Andy Griffith Show, The Ghost and Mr. Chicken uses a similar small-town setting and involved a number of alumni from the sitcom, including director Alan Rafkin and writers Jim Fritzell and Everett Greenbaum. It was a box office success, paving the way for a string of other Knotts-fronted comedy films. The working title was Running Scared. The title is presumably a humorous variation of the film The Ghost and Mrs. Muir (1947).

== Plot ==
Luther Heggs is a typesetter for the Rachel Courier Express in the town of Rachel, Kansas, who lives at the Natalie Miller boarding house and aspires to be a reporter. Luther is not taken seriously, and his peers mock him when his report of a murder near the supposedly haunted Simmons Mansion proves to be nothing more than a local drunk knocked unconscious by his irate wife. Full-time reporter Ollie Weaver ridicules Luther over his mistake. Ollie is dating Alma Parker, on whom Luther has a crush.

While at work, asked to add some filler to the paper, Luther learns from the newspaper's janitor, Mr. Kelsey, who was a gardener at the Simmons Mansion, that the mansion was the site of a supposed murder–suicide, where Ephraigm Simmons is thought to have killed his wife with a bladed instrument before leaping to his death from the organ loft. Legend has it that the ghost of Mr. Simmons can still occasionally be heard playing the organ at midnight.

Kelsey encourages Luther to write about the Simmons Mansion. When the editor, George Beckett, reads the article, Kelsey plants subtle hints, resulting in Beckett assigning Luther to spend the night in the manor on the 20th anniversary of the murder-suicide and write about his experience. Fear makes Luther hesitant to take the job, but the realization that this is his big chance to become a reporter as well as an opportunity to impress Alma pushes him to accept. While staying at the mansion, he hurls a book at a bookshelf in an effort to silence eerie knocking and laughter which is keeping him from sleep, inadvertently opening a hidden passage to the organ loft. At midnight, the bloodstained organ begins to play by itself. Luther flees downstairs and finds pruning shears stabbed in a painting of Mrs. Simmons, with blood gushing from her neck.

Luther's story gets the town abuzz and makes him a local hero. He begins dating Alma, who tells Luther (and later Ollie himself) that her relationship with Ollie is not committed. Nicholas Simmons, the nephew of the deceased couple, had been planning to demolish the mansion, but his banker now refuses to close on the deal due to his spiritualist wife considering it a local landmark. Nicholas attempts to discredit Luther by taking him and the Rachel Courier Express to court for libel. Nicholas' attorney brings in Luther's grade school teacher as a character witness and accuses Luther of concocting the story in the Simmons Manor to win a job as a full-time reporter. The judge orders the jury and all interested parties to reconvene at the Simmons house before midnight to settle the issue.

At the mansion, Luther is unable to make the hidden passage open again. Alma remains to continue searching for the passage, while everyone else leaves the mansion, convinced Luther fabricated the story. Luther starts to walk home but hears the old organ and finds it played by Kelsey. Kelsey confesses to staging the mysterious happenings Luther witnessed, unable to help Luther confirm his story as he was kept out of the mansion by Officer Herkie. Kelsey explains that he needs Luther's help to expose the true cause of the Simmons' deaths.

They hear a scream from the secret passage, and find Nicholas holding Alma captive. Kelsey accuses Nicholas of attempting to frame him for the murder of the Simmons couple by using Kelsey's shears as the murder weapon, and tearing down the Simmons Mansion to destroy the hidden passage he used as his alibi. Luther rescues Alma by knocking Nicholas over with a full body lunge from behind. Nicholas is arrested, and Kelsey explains everything. Alma and Luther marry. At the end of the wedding, the organ music segues to the theme played in the Simmons mansion. Everyone - including Kelsey - turns to see the small organ's keys moving by themselves, hinting that there really is a ghost after all.

== Cast ==
- Don Knotts as Luther Heggs
- Joan Staley as Alma Parker
- Liam Redmond as Kelsey
- Sandra Gould as Loretta Pine
- Dick Sargent as George Beckett
- Skip Homeier as Ollie Weaver
- Philip Ober as Nicholas Simmons
- Lurene Tuttle as Mrs. Natalie Miller
- Harry Hickox as Police Chief Art Fuller
- George Chandler as Judge Harley Nast
- Charles Lane as Lawyer Whitlow
- Nydia Westman as Mrs. Cobb
- Jesslyn Fax as Mrs. Hutchinson
- Reta Shaw as Mrs. Halcyon Maxwell
- James Millhollin as Mr. Milo Maxwell
- Robert Cornthwaite as Lawyer Springer
- Cliff Norton as Charlie, the Bailiff
- Jim Boles as Billy Ray Fox
- James Begg as Herkie
- Ceil Cabot as Bit/clubwoman
- Ellen Corby as Miss Neva Tremaine, the grade school teacher
- Dick Wilson as Bandleader
- Everett Greenbaum (uncredited) as male voice shouting "Attaboy, Luther!"
- Burt Mustin (uncredited) as Mr. Deligondo
- Hal Smith (uncredited) as Calver Weems
- Hope Summers (uncredited) as Susanna Blush
- J. Edward McKinley (uncredited) as Mayor Carlyle Preston
- Eddie Quillan (uncredited) as Elevator Operator

== Production ==
This film was produced by Universal Studios, which produced numerous classic horror films. Actor Don Knotts was best known at the time of the film's production for his Emmy Award-winning five seasons on the sitcom The Andy Griffith Show as small town deputy sheriff Barney Fife. Knotts planned to leave the television series at the end of the 1964–1965 season in order to pursue a film career. He had already starred in The Incredible Mr. Limpet (1964).

Andy Griffith, Knotts' co-star on The Andy Griffith Show, suggested expanding on an episode from the television series involving a deserted house (the old Rimshaw house in the episode "Haunted House" aired October 1963) in which Barney, Gomer, and Andy retrieve a baseball of Opie and his friend from the house. As The Andy Griffith Show approached the end of the 1964–65 season, Knotts asked two of the sitcom's writers, Jim Fritzell and Everett Greenbaum, if they would be interested in working on a screenplay for him during the sitcom's hiatus. They agreed, and Universal put Fritzell and Greenbaum under contract. The story outline was worked out by Fritzell, Greenbaum, Knotts, Griffith, and producer Edward Montagne in a series of meetings, with Griffith given a token compensation (and no screen credit) for his input, which included the idea of making the line "Attaboy, Luther!" a running gag. Knotts also claimed to have had a hand in writing the actual screenplay, though he acknowledged that Fritzell and Greenbaum did the lion's share of it. Greenbaum came up with the film's title, after the original title "Running Scared" turned out to be unavailable.

After he learned that the film had a shooting schedule of just 17 days, Knotts suggested Alan Rafkin for the director's seat, since Rafkin had directed several episodes of The Andy Griffith Show and impressed Knotts with his efficiency.

Universal contract star Joan Staley was known by Rafkin from their work together on the sitcom Broadside. Normally a blonde, she had to wear a dark wig, because the producers felt she was "too sexy" as a blonde and the role called for a brunette. She wore the same wig previously worn by Claudia Cardinale in Blindfold (1966). Al Checco, Knotts' Army-days comedy partner, had an uncredited appearance in the film.

The "Simmons Mansion", a three-story Second-Empire Victorian house, stands on Colonial Street on the Universal Studios lot in California and was built for the film So Goes My Love (1946). It appeared as the Dowd house in the film Harvey (1950), and, with several alterations to the architecture, served as the home of Gabrielle Solis in Desperate Housewives (2004–2012).

The "Simmons Mansion" is not the Munster house, although they are next door to each other on the new (relocated) Colonial street, with the Munster house on the right. Originally, they were on the old Colonial street, which was located next to New York street and Courthouse Square, with the Munster house to the left of the "Simmons Mansion". The old Colonial Street is where The Ghost and Mr. Chicken movie was filmed.

Knotts personally called the Bon Ami company president to get permission to mention the cleaning product's name in one of the film's running gags. Throughout the movie, Knotts drove an Edsel Corsair, which was considered a commercial failure, to bolster the character Luther Heggs' quirky reputation.

The original cut of the film included a scene where the portrait stabbing was explained. Kelsey had printed a copy of the portrait and placed on the back side of the one on the landing of the staircase. When pressing a secret button, the portrait turned to reveal the shears stuck in the throat with red paint. This scene was cut from all other prints and has only been seen a few times in theaters, and on some television showings.

Knotts' popularity prompted a multiple-movie deal with Universal, starting with this movie, and followed by The Reluctant Astronaut (1967), The Shakiest Gun in the West (1968), The Love God? (1969), and How to Frame a Figg (1971). Several other players from The Andy Griffith Show appear in The Ghost and Mr. Chicken, including Lurene Tuttle, Burt Mustin, Reta Shaw, Hal Smith and Hope Summers.

== Reception ==
=== Box office ===
The Ghost and Mr. Chicken grossed $4 million in the first five months after its release on a $500,000 budget.

=== Critical reception ===
The film received mixed reviews from critics. On Rotten Tomatoes, it has a score of 67%, based on six critics, with an average score of 6.2 out of 10.

== Home media ==
The Ghost and Mr. Chicken was released on VHS in 1996. Universal released the film on DVD September 2, 2003, and again on January 9, 2007, and on Blu-ray on October 4, 2016.

== Soundtrack ==
On July 12, 2005, Percepto released the soundtrack on compact disc. Composer Vic Mizzy used the old tune "Mr. Ghost Goes to Town" as his main theme. Mizzy's haunted house organ theme also appeared in the film Games (1967).

1. Gaseous Globe (Universal logo intro)
2. Main Title
3. Luther Has a Scoop
4. Laugh's on Luther
5. Bashful One
6. Kelsey's Tale
7. Twenty Years Ago
8. Super S'Luther
9. Clock Watchers
10. Oh, Chute
11. Rickety Tik Phono
12. Creepy Jeepers
13. Haunted Organ
14. Hero to the
15. Hero's Picnic
16. Picnic Table
17. Speech Is Over
18. Alma Matters
19. Back to the Mansion
20. Chick-Napped
21. Plucky Chicken
22. Wedding & Finale
23. When in Southern California, Visit Universal City Studios (promotional tag)

== See also ==
- List of American films of 1966
