= Bernard Green (composer) =

American composer

- Born: Bernard Greenwald; September 14, 1908; New York City, U.S.
- Died: August 8, 1975 (aged 66); Westport, Connecticut, U.S.
- Occupation: Composer

Bernard Green (September 14, 1908 – August 8, 1975, born Bernard Greenwald) was an American composer. Green composed for radio and television programs, including Your Show of Shows, Mister Peepers and Celanese Theatre. He was nominated for two Primetime Emmy Awards in the category Outstanding Music for his work on the television programs Hallmark Hall of Fame and CBS Playhouse.

Green died in August 1975 at his home in Westport, Connecticut, at the age of 66.
