= Mister Peepers =

American television series

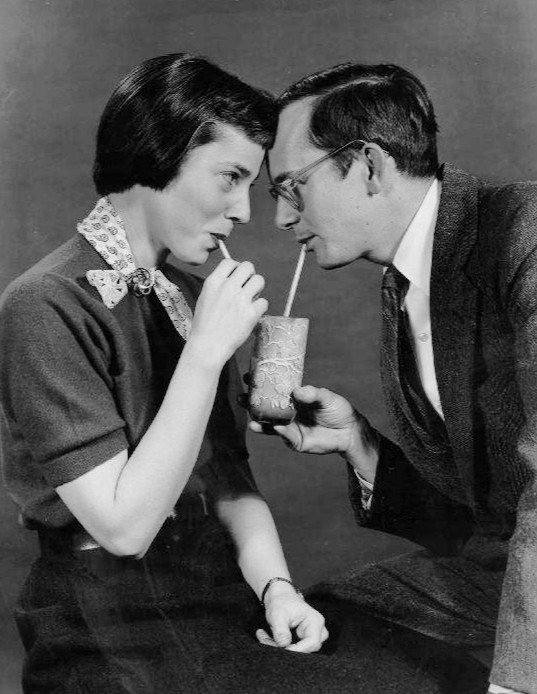
- Wally Cox and Patricia Benoit, 1954
- Genre: Sitcom
- Created by: David Swift
- Written by: Robert Alan Aurthur; Everett Greenbaum; Bill Larkin; Biff McGuire; Jim Fritzell; Howard Rodman; David Swift
- Directed by: Hal Keith; James Sheldon
- Starring: Wally Cox
- Composer: Bernard Green
- Country of origin: United States
- Original language: English
- No. of seasons: 3
- No. of episodes: 127 (102 surviving)

Production
- Executive producer: David Swift
- Producer: Fred Coe
- Running time: 30 mins.

Original release
- Network: NBC
- Release: July 3, 1952 – June 12, 1955

Mister Peepers is an American sitcom that aired on NBC from July 3, 1952, to June 12, 1955.

== Overview ==
Wally Cox starred as Robinson J. Peepers, Jefferson City's junior high school science teacher. Others in the cast included Tony Randall as history teacher Harvey Weskit; Georgiann Johnson as Harvey's wife, Marge; Patricia Benoit as school nurse Nancy Remington; Marion Lorne as oft-confused English teacher Mrs. Gurney; Jack Warden as athletic coach Frank Whip; and Ernest Truex and Sylvia Field as Nancy's parents.

The series began as a live summer replacement for Ford Festival and was so popular that thousands wrote to NBC praising the series. When the Fall 1952 television season began, the filmed series Doc Corkle was so unpopular that additional scripts for Mr. Peepers were quickly written, and that series replaced Doc Corkle in October.

The series often involved Peepers coping with misbehaving inanimate objects or embarrassing moments. In a typical scene, Peepers sees a hopscotch grid chalked on a sidewalk, and thinking himself alone plays the game with abandon, only to discover that his girlfriend Nancy has been silently watching the entire time.

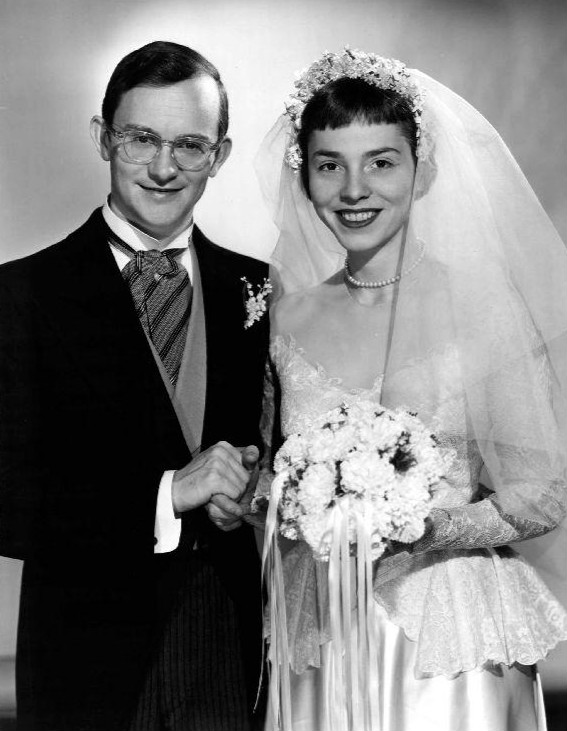
Mr. and Mrs. Peepers, 1954

The principal's dithering wife, Mrs. Gurney, played by Marion Lorne, is kind and gracious but absentminded. In one episode, Peepers injures his finger with a hammer, and Mrs. Gurney solicitously bandages his finger to at least five times its actual size. After Mrs. Gurney leaves the room, Peepers tells Nancy that the wrong finger had been bandaged.

Tony Randall played history teacher Harvey Weskit. Popular and confident Weskit becomes the best friend of timid, bespectacled Peepers. In one episode, Weskit points out a packet of unopened love letters that women have sent him, complaining that he is always getting them. He begins to look inside Peepers' locker to see the stack of similar letters he expects to find there, and Peepers quickly closes the locker door, commenting that he has to keep the door closed so that they will not all fall out.

Patricia Benoit, as Nancy Remington, is Peepers' love interest, although for a time, she seems unaware of his attraction to her. By February 1954, though, the couple's romance had progressed to the point of Mr. Peepers presenting Nancy with a photograph of himself, inscribed "Scientifically yours, Robinson". Peepers proposed on the April 18th episode, and the couple wed on the May 23, 1954, show. The marriage episode was one of the major television events of 1954. The American TV magazine TV Guide used the picture of the couple's television wedding on its cover page.

Mister Peepers was aired live on stage before an audience at the New Century Theatre, 932 7th Avenue, New York City—preserved in the form of 16 mm kinescopes.

Wally Cox was typecast by the role of the mild-mannered Peepers but continued on to a long career in films and television. He later starred in a comedy/adventure series, The Adventures of Hiram Holliday and is remembered as the voice of the cartoon superhero Underdog. Cox was also a regular panelist on The Hollywood Squares from 1966 until his death in 1973. He also wrote and published a novel, Mr. Peepers (1955), based on scripts from the televised adventures of the character.

== Production ==
David Swift created the show and wrote for it, along with Jim Fritzell. Fred Coe was the producer, and Hal Keith was the director. Bernie Green was the music director.

== Episode status ==
Reportedly, 102 of the 127 episode Kinescopes of Mister Peepers survive. RetroTV aired episodes of the show on Wednesday mornings, concluding in 2021.

Twenty-six episodes running from July 3, 1952 — when Peepers first arrives as the new science teacher (Note: Episode name: "Mr. Peepers Gets a Job".) — until March 1, 1953, (Note: Episode name: "Hunting for an Apartment".) are available for streaming in Canada from Tubi TV.

== DVD release ==
In 2005, the first 26 episodes of Mister Peepers, which had been preserved by the UCLA Film and Television Archive, were released on DVD by S'more Entertainment. In November 2008, the second boxed set of Mister Peepers was released by S'more Entertainment. The tagline at the bottom of the box reads: "America's Favorite Science Teacher, Underdog and All-Round Nice Guy." The Underdog comment coyly references Cox's later role as the voice of the title character in the Underdog cartoon.

Mister Peepers began as a summer replacement series in 1952. The first DVD set, titled Mr. Peepers, contains the summer episodes, as well as those from October 1952 to March 1953 episodes of the first full season. The Mister Peepers - Season 2 DVD sets picks up where the first set left off, containing episodes from the remainder of the first season and part of the second season, from March 1953 to November 1953.

== Awards and nominations ==
Year	Result	Award	Category	Recipient
1952	Winner	Peabody Awards		
1953	Nominated	Primetime Emmy Awards	Best Situation Comedy	
1954	Nominated	Primetime Emmy Awards	Best Situation Comedy	
1954	Nominated	Primetime Emmy Awards	Best Series Supporting Actress	Marion Lorne
1954	Nominated	Primetime Emmy Awards	Best Series Supporting Actor	Tony Randall
1954	Nominated	Primetime Emmy Awards	Best Male Star of Regular Series	Wally Cox
1955	Nominated	Primetime Emmy Awards	Best Written Comedy Material	James Fritzell & Everett Greenbaum
1955	Nominated	Primetime Emmy Awards	Best Supporting Actress in a Regular Series	Marion Lorne
1955	Nominated	Primetime Emmy Awards	Best Situation Comedy Series	
