= My Dreams Are Getting Better All the Time =

Song by Les Brown and Doris Day
- Released: 1945
- Recorded: March 2, 1945
- Genre: Pop
- Length: 3:30
- Label: Columbia Records
- Songwriter(s): Vic Mizzy, Manny Curtis

"My Dreams Are Getting Better All the Time" is a 1945 popular song.

The music was written by Vic Mizzy and the lyrics by Manny Curtis. The song was published in 1944 and was introduced in the 1944 film In Society by Marion Hutton.

== Notable recordings ==
- The biggest hit version of the song was recorded by the Les Brown Orchestra with a vocal by Doris Day. The Les Brown/Doris Day version was recorded on March 2, 1945 and released by Columbia Records as catalog number 36779. The record first reached the Billboard charts on March 15, 1945, and lasted 12 weeks on the chart, peaking at #1. Although this record was made after the big Brown/Day hit, "Sentimental Journey," it actually hit the charts earlier.
- Another charting version was done by Johnny Long with Dick Robertson. The Johnny Long/Dick Robertson version was recorded on February 20, 1945 and was released by Decca Records as catalog number 18661. The record first reached the Billboard magazine charts on April 5, 1945, and lasted 6 weeks on the chart, peaking at #3.
- Louis Prima and His Orchestra recorded the song in June 1944 for Majestic Records (catalog No. 7128).
- Perry Como sang the sang on his Chesterfield Supper Club broadcast in January 1945 and the recording was placed on a V-Disc for the Armed Forces (V-Disc Record Number A-410-B ( Navy N-190-B.).
- Bing Crosby sang the song twice on his radio show in April and May 1945.
