= Patricia Benoit =

American actress (1927–2018)

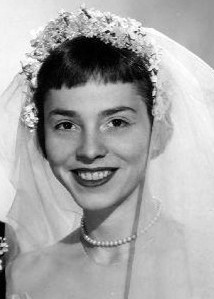
- Patricia Benoit poses for the television wedding (for breakthrough 1954 TV series Mister Peepers) on 30 March 1954.
- Born: 21 February 1927; Fort Worth, Texas, U.S.
- Died: 6 August 2018 (aged 91); Port Chester, New York, U.S.
- Occupations: stage actress, television actress
- Years active: 1950–1963
- Known for: Mister Peepers
- Spouse: Parton Swift (1952-1991,his death)
- Children: 2

Patricia Eloise Benoit (February 21, 1927 – August 6, 2018) was an American television and stage actress. She starred as the title character's eventual wife Nancy Remington in the 1950s TV series, Mister Peepers.

== Early life ==
Born February 21, 1927, in Fort Worth, Texas, Benoit had attended both Paschal High School and Texas State College for Women before deciding to pursue acting as a career. Moving to New York City in her late teens, Benoit attended the American Academy of Dramatic Arts for two years.

== Career ==
She also made a solitary appearance in the television series Believe It or Not in 1950 before earning a career breakthrough performance in Broadway comedy sitcom Glad Tidings where she played the role of long-lost daughter of Melvyn Douglas. She also received an award for Outstanding New Talent at the Theatre World Award in 1952.

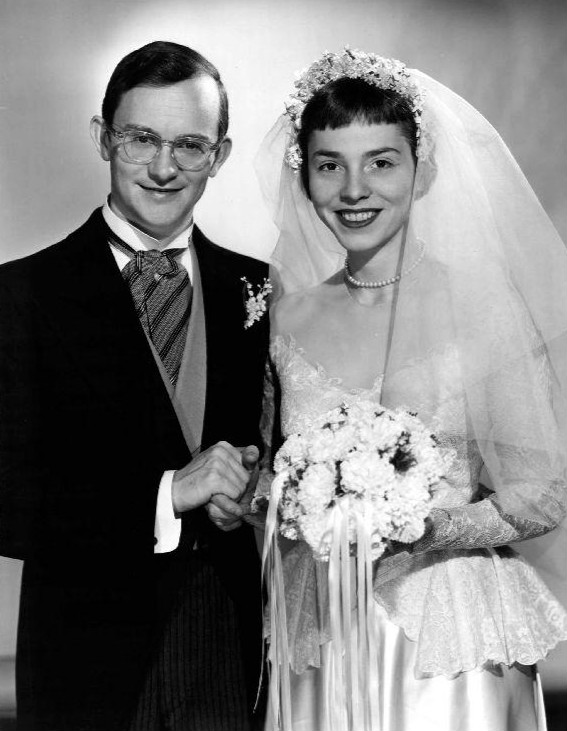
Patricia Benoit (on the right) poses for the television wedding with Wally Cox (on the left) for breakthrough 1954 TV series Mister Peepers on 30 March 1954.

Benoit appeared on the CBS Television show, I've Got a Secret, on the May 19, 1954 episode, along with her co-star, Wally Cox.

She also rose to prominence by playing the role of Wally Cox's sweetheart in the record breaking 1950s NBC television series, Mister Peepers. The wedding moment between her and Wally Cox was a record smashing moment in television history in 1954 and was largely appreciated by the TV audience. The American TV magazine TV Guide used the picture of the couple's television wedding in 1954 in its cover page.

== Personal life ==
She was married to Parton Swift Jr. from 1952 until his death in 1991. They had two sons, Jeremy and Nicholas. They had two sons.

== Death ==
Benoit died at her home in Port Chester, New York, on August 6, 2018, at the age of 91, survived by her sons and her sister, Mrs. Doris Wright.
