= Vic Mizzy =

American composer (1916–2009)

- Mizzy in a publicity photo

Background information
- Born: Victor Mizansky; January 9, 1916; New York City, U.S.
- Died: October 17, 2009 (aged 93) Los Angeles, California, U.S.
- Occupations: Composer; musician
- Years active: Late 1930s–2009

Vic Mizzy (born Victor Mizansky; January 9, 1916 – October 17, 2009) was an American composer and musician for television and movies. His best-known works are the themes to the 1960s television sitcoms Green Acres and The Addams Family. Mizzy also wrote top-20 songs from the 1930s to 1940s.

== Early life ==
Mizzy was born Victor Mizansky on January 9, 1916, in the borough of Brooklyn in New York City; he was the eldest of two children born to Abraham and Gussie Mizansky, Russian immigrants of Jewish ancestry. He attended New York University. As a child, he played accordion and piano, and was largely self-taught as a composer. During World War II, he served in the United States Navy where he wrote some of his hit songs.

== Songwriting ==
In the late 1930s, while based in New York City, Mizzy began composing a string of popular songs. These included Doris Day's 1945 hit "My Dreams Are Getting Better All the Time". Other Mizzy compositions were "There's a Faraway Look in Your Eye" and "Three Little Sisters", both co-written with lyricist Irving Taylor. The latter were sung by the Andrews Sisters on Decca Records and in the 1942 Universal film Private Buckaroo, in which the sisters appeared with Harry James' big band.

Dinah Shore also recorded "Three Little Sisters"; "Take It Easy" (also with lyricist Taylor), "Pretty Kitty Blue Eyes", "The Whole World Is Singing My Song", "Choo'n Gum" (recorded by the Andrews Sisters, as well as Teresa Brewer), "The Jones Boy", which was a 1953 hit for the Mills Brothers, and "With a Hey and a Hi and a Ho-Ho-Ho".

=== Film and television ===
Mizzy broke into television circa 1959, composing music for Shirley Temple's Storybook and the themes for Moment of Fear, Klondike and Kentucky Jones. During the 1960s, he wrote themes and scores for the hit shows Green Acres and The Addams Family, as well as for other sitcoms, including The Pruitts of Southampton, The Double Life of Henry Phyfe, Captain Nice, The Don Rickles Show, and Temperatures Rising, and the 1964–1965 comedy drama Kentucky Jones.

A soundtrack album was released in 1965 containing all his compositions from The Addams Family entitled Original Music From The Addams Family. The single of the theme reached #25 on Canada's CHUM Charts. Mizzy rewrote and conducted The Addams Family Theme with a slightly different melody for the 1977 television special Halloween with the New Addams Family, which reunited most of the original cast of the 1964–1966 TV series.

He also wrote the scores for five Don Knotts films, including The Ghost and Mr. Chicken (1966), The Reluctant Astronaut (1967), The Shakiest Gun in the West (1968) (released on CD by Percepto in 2007), The Love God? (1969) and How to Frame a Figg (1971), releasing scores on a Compact Disc companion to some of their DVD releases.

His other film work includes the scores for the William Castle films The Night Walker (1964), The Busy Body (1967) and The Spirit Is Willing (1967), as well as other 1960s movies such as A Very Special Favor (1965), The Caper of the Golden Bulls (1967), Don't Make Waves (1967), The Perils of Pauline (1967) and Did You Hear the One About the Traveling Saleslady? (1968)

He also composed underscores for the television series The Richard Boone Show and Quincy, M.E., as well as for such television films as The Deadly Hunt (1971), Hurricane (1974), Terror on the 40th Floor (1974), The Million Dollar Rip-Off (1976) and The Munsters' Revenge (1981). Toward the end of his career, Mizzy was commissioned by filmmaker Sam Raimi to compose music for the outtakes (gag reel) special features for the DVD releases of the films Spider-Man 2 and Spider-Man 3.

== Personal life and death ==
Mizzy had two children with his first wife, Mary Small, who as a 1930s child singer had been known as "The Little Girl With The Big Voice," and who remained popular (especially on radio) through the 1950s. One of her daughters, Patty Keeler, a singer and songwriter, often worked with songwriter Doc Pomus.

Mizzy died at his home in the Bel Air neighborhood of Los Angeles on October 17, 2009, aged 93. He was interred at Eden Memorial Park in Mission Hills, California.

== Songs include ==
- "I'll Never Fail You" (1938) with Irving Taylor
- "Igloo" (1939) with Irving Taylor
- "Three Little Sisters" (1942) with Irving Taylor
- "Take It Easy" (1943) with Albert De Bru and Irving Taylor
- "I Had a Little Talk with the Lord" (1943) with Manny Curtis (World War II song)
- "Pretty Kitty Blue Eyes" (1944) with Manny Curtis
- "My Dreams Are Getting Better All the Time" (1945) with Manny Curtis
- "Oh How She Lied to Me" (1945) with Manny Curtis
- "With a Hey and a Hi and a Ho-Ho-Ho" (1947) with Manny Curtis
- "In the Middle, In the Middle, In the Middle", an early 1960s anti-jaywalking public service announcement for New York City, sung by Mizzy's daughter Patty Keeler. The song was later covered by They Might Be Giants (No!, 2002)
