= The Haunted House (The Andy Griffith Show) =

- The Andy Griffith Show episode
- Episode no.: Season 4 Episode 2
- Directed by: Earl Bellamy
- Written by: Harvey Bullock
- Original air date: October 7, 1963
- Running time: 30 minutes

"The Haunted House" is the second episode of the fourth season of The Andy Griffith Show. It aired on CBS on October 7, 1963. In the episode, a local haunted house is revealed to be cover for a criminal operation.

The episode inspired the 1966 film The Ghost and Mr. Chicken, also starring Don Knots.

== Plot ==
After Opie hits a baseball into the abandoned and allegedly-haunted Rimshaw House, he and his friend try to retrieve it but are scared away by ghostly moans. Deputy Barney and Gomer visit the house and are similarly scared away. Town drunk Otis warns all to stay away from the house.

After Andy visits the house with Barney and Gomer, it is revealed that Otis and moonshiner Big Jack Anderson have been scaring away people to prevent discovery of a still. Andy uses their own trick against them, scaring the men and driving them from the house.

== Cast ==
- Andy Griffith as Andy Taylor
- Ron Howard as Opie Taylor
- Don Knotts as Barney Fife
- Frances Bavier as Aunt Bee

== See also ==
- Scooby-Doo, Where Are You!, a 1969 animated series in which supernatural events are staged as cover for crimes
