= Good Neighbor Sam =

1964 film by David Swift

- Theatrical release poster
- Directed by: David Swift
- Screenplay by: James Fritzell; Everett Greenbaum; David Swift
- Based on: Good Neighbor Sam; 1963 novel by Jack Finney
- Produced by: David Swift
- Starring: Jack Lemmon; Romy Schneider; Dorothy Provine; Michael Connors; Edward Andrews; Louis Nye; Robert Q. Lewis; Edward G. Robinson
- Cinematography: Burnett Guffey
- Edited by: Charles Nelson
- Music by: Frank De Vol
- Distributed by: Columbia Pictures
- Release date: July 22, 1964
- Running time: 130 minutes
- Country: United States
- Language: English
- Box office: $9.1 million

Good Neighbor Sam is a 1964 American screwball comedy film co-written and directed by David Swift, based on the 1963 novel of the same name by Jack Finney. Shot in Eastman Color, it stars Jack Lemmon, Romy Schneider, Dorothy Provine, Michael Connors, Edward Andrews, Louis Nye, Robert Q. Lewis, and Edward G. Robinson. In the film, a family man is talked into helping his wife's recently divorced best friend claim a large inheritance by posing as her husband in order to fulfill a legal requirement. However, the ruse spills over into the man's advertising job, where his recent promotion requires him to maintain a wholesome image.

The screenplay was the motion picture debut of James Fritzell and Everett Greenbaum, who had written many American television sitcoms including The Andy Griffith Show and Mister Peepers (created by Swift). Greenbaum also created the mobile sculpture featured in the film.

== Plot ==
Sam Bissell works in the art department of a San Francisco advertising agency, but feels that his career is going nowhere after working in the same low-level job for six years without a promotion. He lives in a suburban home with his loving wife, Min, and their two young daughters.

At the agency, an extremely important client, puritanical dairy tycoon Simon Nurdlinger, demands that an upstanding "family man" represent his advertising account, or else he will take his business elsewhere. Since Sam is the only employee who qualifies, his boss, Mr. Burke, introduces Mr. Nurdlinger to Sam. Mr. Nurdlinger is impressed by Sam's wholesome approach and hires him as his account executive. When Sam goes home to celebrate, he meets Min's longtime friend and their new next-door neighbor, Janet Lagerlof, and they all go out to dinner together to celebrate his promotion and Janet's new home.

Janet, a beautiful woman, is recently divorced from her husband Howard Ebbets and is happier than ever. She has also come into a $15 million inheritance from her grandfather, though his will stipulates that she must be happily married in order to receive the inheritance. California law dictates that a divorce is not final until a year from final settlement. Since only six months have passed, Janet decides to hide the divorce from her cousins Irene and Jack, who stand to inherit if Janet is disqualified. When Irene and Jack arrive for a surprise visit, Janet introduces Sam as her husband. Although they have never met Howard, Irene and Jack remain suspicious of Janet.

At Min's suggestion, Janet drives Sam to work to avoid suspicion. There, Sam introduces Janet as his wife to Mr. Burke and Mr. Nurdlinger, who invites Sam and Janet to a dinner party at his home. When Irene and Jack hire a private investigator to watch the couple from a fake vacuum cleaner truck parked opposite their houses, Sam and Janet are forced to continue the charade over the next few days, with Sam sneaking back and forth between his house and Janet's. Despite Min's complicity, she soon becomes jealous of Sam and Janet.

While Sam is sleeping over at Janet's house one night, Howard sneaks in and attempts a reconciliation with Janet, who refuses. With the private investigator still parked outside, Howard is forced to pose as Min's husband, arousing the jealousy of both Sam and Janet. The day before the probate court to settle the distribution of the Lagerlof will, Sam panics when he finds that Nurdlinger billboards have been erected all over the city with pictures of him and Janet, identifying them as "Mr. and Mrs. Sam Bissell". Since Janet risks losing the inheritance, she and Sam stay up all night defacing the billboards, even though Min, feeling that the charade has gone too far, threatens to leave Sam.

To access the final billboard, Sam rents a room in a cheap hotel, unaware that it is frequented by prostitutes. A prostitute enters Sam's room, but when she sees him carrying paint cans and a paintbrush, she flees the room screaming for help. Sam chases her through the hotel, trying to explain himself, until Janet arrives and defuses the situation by telling the desk clerk and the prostitute that Sam is a famous painter who merely checked into the hotel to paint.

The next day, Janet and Howard argue as she accuses him of only wanting her back because of her inheritance money, but they eventually agree to rekindle their relationship. Sam returns home and reconciles with Min.

== Cast ==
- Jack Lemmon as Sam Bissell
- Romy Schneider as Janet Lagerlof
- Dorothy Provine as Minerva Bissell
- Michael Connors as Howard Ebbets
- Edward Andrews as Mr. Burke
- Louis Nye as Reinhold Shiffner
- Robert Q. Lewis as Earl
- Joyce Jameson as girl
- Anne Seymour as Irene
- Charles Lane as Jack Bailey
- Linda Watkins as Edna
- Peter Hobbs as Phil Reisner
- Tris Coffin as Sonny Blatchford
- Neil Hamilton as Larry Boling
- Riza Royce as Miss Halverson
- William Forrest as Millard Mellner
- The Hi-Lo's as themselves
- Edward G. Robinson as Simon Nurdlinger

In addition, in her last film role, Bess Flowers has an uncredited appearance as Mrs. Burke.

== Production ==
Principal photography began on September 30, 1963, with filming taking place at the Columbia studio in Los Angeles, while exterior shots were filmed in downtown Los Angeles and at several San Francisco locations, including the Fairmont San Francisco, the Golden Gate Bridge, Union Square, the Embarcadero, and San Francisco International Airport.

Bernie Kopell and Barbara Bouchet have uncredited roles, as does director Swift.

== Reception ==
The film grossed $9,072,726 at the box office in the United States, earning $5.3 million in U.S. theatrical rentals.

== See also ==
- List of American films of 1964
