= Alan Rafkin =

American television director (1928–2001)

- Born: Alfred Irwin Rafkin; July 23, 1928; New York City, U.S.
- Died: August 6, 2001 (aged 73); Los Angeles, California, U.S.
- Education: Syracuse University
- Occupations: Actor; director; producer
- Years active: 1958–2000
- Children: 2

Alan Rafkin (born Alfred Irwin Rafkin; July 23, 1928 – August 6, 2001) was an American director, producer, and actor for television.

== Biography ==
Rafkin was born in New York City to Til and Victor Rafkin. He attended Admiral Farragut Academy in Pine Beach, New Jersey and Syracuse University in New York.

Alan Rafkin was one of the most prolific sitcom directors of all time, helming such series as The Andy Griffith Show, The Dick Van Dyke Show, The Mary Tyler Moore Show, What's Happening!!, M*A*S*H, It's Garry Shandling's Show, Murphy Brown, Get Smart, Coach, The Tim Conway Show, Paul Sand in Friends and Lovers, and Viva Valdez.

According to his autobiography Cue the Bunny on the Rainbow (its title is taken from a direction on Captain Kangaroo), Rafkin directed episodes of over 80 different sitcom series. He won an Emmy for an episode of "One Day At A Time" and two CableACE Awards for his work on "It's Garry Shandling's Show". During his career he worked with legendary producers such as Sheldon Leonard, Danny Thomas, and Norman Lear. Rafkin had endearing relationships with many of his actors including Andy Griffith, Dick Van Dyke, Jerry Van Dyke, Mary Tyler Moore, Bob Newhart and Redd Foxx. (He was also close with Don Knotts, directing him on the Griffith show and in three feature films.) At the same time, he had volatile relationships with several others, including Demond Wilson and Craig T. Nelson.

Rafkin died of heart disease in Los Angeles, California, at the age of 73.

== Filmography ==
As director:

- Bewitched (1964–1965)
- I Dream of Jeannie (1965)
- Ski Party (1965)
- The Ghost and Mr. Chicken (1966)
- The Ride to Hangman's Tree (1967)
- The Shakiest Gun in the West (1968)
- Angel in My Pocket (1969)
- The Good Guys (1969)
  - "Winer, Diner and Mover"
  - "The Chimp"
- The Tim Conway Show (1970)
  - "Mail Contract"
- How to Frame a Figg (1971)
- The Bob Newhart Show (1972)
  - various episodes
- Sanford and Son (1974–1976)
  - various episodes
- Paul Sand in Friends and Lovers (1974)
  - "Fiddler in the House"
  - "Dreyfuss and Dreyfuss, Associates"
  - "All's Well That Ends"
  - "The Groupie"
- Viva Valdez (1976)
  - all 12 episodes
- One Day at a Time (1978–1983)
  - various episodes
- It's Garry Shandling's Show (1986–1989)
- Laverne & Shirley (1977)
  - various episodes
- The Love Boat (1977)
- Alice (1977)
  - "A Night to Remember"

Jeannie and the marriage caper S1, Ep 4
