= How to Frame a Figg =

1971 film by Alan Rafkin

- Directed by: Alan Rafkin
- Screenplay by: George Tibbles
- Story by: Edward Montagne; Don Knotts
- Produced by: Edward Montagne
- Starring: Don Knotts; Joe Flynn; Elaine Joyce; Edward Andrews; Yvonne Craig; Frank Welker
- Cinematography: William Margulies
- Edited by: Sam E. Waxman
- Music by: Vic Mizzy
- Distributed by: Universal Pictures
- Release date: February 1971
- Running time: 103 minutes
- Country: United States
- Language: English

How to Frame a Figg is a 1971 American comedy film about a bookkeeper's bungling assistant, Hollis Alexander Figg (played by Don Knotts), in the Dalton city hall, who finds himself framed for embezzlement.

== Plot ==
Hollis Figg is an earnest if not too bright man whose devoted friend is a local sanitation worker, and whose girlfriend is the equally earnest Ema Letha, a pretty waitress at the diner across the street from City Hall, where Figg works as an accountant. When the Mayor, his staff, and Mr. Spaulding, the richest man in town, decide they need more cover for their shameless skimming from the city's coffers, they fire three of the four accountants in the basement and replace them with a giant computer named LEO (Large-Capacity Enumerating Officiator), keeping Figg whom they deem the dimmest of the four to run the computer that he barely comprehends. When Figg unexpectedly (and quite accidentally) stumbles upon discrepancies in a road works budget, they promote him to the "third floor", distract him with a new Cadillac and a sexy assistant (Yvonne Craig) who is able to manipulate him into signing any form or check that she places on his desk. Of course the curvaceous secretary doesn't sit too well with Ema Letha either.

Sooner rather than later, the Assistant State Attorney General becomes suspicious of the activities of the Dalton City Council, and when he closes in, Figg, having signed everything, is the perfect patsy. Figg manages to avoid arrest by disguising himself as the mourning mother of the suddenly dead Mr. Spaulding, using the disguise to get into city hall to get the evidence he needs out of LEO, the computer, to clear his name. When he finds the memory bank of the computer (the size of a refrigerator) missing and the dead body of Spaulding in a closet, he deduces that the City Council has buried the memory bank in the coffin of the dead man. Figg and his loyal buddy sneak into the cemetery, exhume the coffin, and plug LEO in. But LEO explodes, spraying IBM cards everywhere. Figg discovers the cards are encoded with the evidence he needs to prove his innocence.

On their honeymoon in Rio de Janeiro, paid for by a grateful city, Ema and Figg bemoan the fact that the City Council got away before they could be arrested. Suddenly, the staff at the hotel look to Figg like the Mayor and his men, but Ema says he is only stressed and mistaken. As the two newlyweds moon over the view from their balcony, the Mayor and one of his cronies, disguised as hotel staff, can be seen removing the stiff corpse of Mr. Spaulding out of the closet on a dolly and wheeling him out of the room.

== Cast ==
- Don Knotts as Hollis Alexander Figg
- Joe Flynn as Kermit Sanderson
- Edward Andrews as Mayor Robert Chrisholm
- Elaine Joyce as Ema Letha Kusic
- Yvonne Craig as Glorianna Hastings
- Frank Welker as Prentiss Gates
- Parker Fennelly as Old Charley Spaulding
- Bill Zuckert as Commissioner Henderson
- Pitt Herbert as Dr Schmidt
- Robert P. Lieb as Commissioner Hayes
- Bob Hastings as Chris Groat
- Bruce Kirby as Dale Groat
- Stuart Nisbet as Gentry Groat
- James Millhollin as Funeral Director
- Fay DeWitt as Grace
- Savannah Bentley as Ethel Purvis
- Athena Lorde as Agnes
- Bill Quinn as Carmoni
- John Archer as Gerard
- Benny Rubin as Max the Elevator Operator

== See also ==
- List of American films of 1971
