= Everett Greenbaum =

American screenwriter

- Born: December 20, 1919; Buffalo, New York, U.S.
- Died: July 11, 1999 (aged 79); Los Angeles, California, U.S.
- Occupations: TV and film screenwriter and actor
- Years active: 1953-1999
- Spouse(s): Deane Ward, (1957-1999, his death)
- Children: 1 daughter, Billie Shane

Everett Greenbaum (December 20, 1919 – July 11, 1999) was an American television and film writer and actor who contributed to such shows as The Andy Griffith Show (24 Episodes), M*A*S*H (35 Episodes), Love American Style, The Real McCoys (32 Episodes), Sanford and Son, and The George Gobel Show. Greenbaum was a co-writer with Jim Fritzell of Mister Peepers an important early television show created by David Swift and starring Wally Cox. He wrote the Hollywood feature film Good Neighbor Sam, as well as a series of films starring Don Knotts that included The Shakiest Gun in the West, The Reluctant Astronaut, and The Ghost and Mr. Chicken.

== Life and career ==
Born and raised in Buffalo, New York, Greenbaum studied at the Massachusetts Institute of Technology (MIT) and the Sorbonne in Paris. Following service as a Navy pilot during World War II, Greenbaum moved to New York City to try his luck as a writer. He began work in radio as writer, producer and star of "Greenbaum's Gallery". He also wrote continuity for a radio series starring the Canadian folk singer Oscar Brand.

In the mid-1950s, Greenbaum teamed with Jim Fritzell and collaborated on scripts for the TV series Mister Peepers (1952), a stylish sitcom starring Wally Cox as a timid small-town science teacher; it also gave Tony Randall his first important role. When the series was cancelled, NBC-TV received over 10,000 letters of protest. A month later Mr. Peepers returned, running for three years and winning a Peabody Award.

In a 32-year partnership, Greenbaum and Fritzell also won three Writers' Guild awards and four Emmy nominations, and collaborated on more than 150 scripts. These included the Walter Brennan sitcom The Real McCoys (1957–62), The Andy Griffith Show (1960–68) and M*A*S*H, on which they worked for five years, contributing 35 episodes. On his own, Greenbaum wrote two books, including the memoir The Goldenberg Who Couldn't Dance, and 'The Tenth Life of Osiris Oaks' (with Wally Cox), and worked on The George Gobel Show. He also acted in brief roles on Mr. Peeper's (recurring), Griffith's Matlock (recurring), and series and other programs.

Greenbaum died at the age of 79 in Los Angeles, California; he was survived by his wife Deane, and a daughter, Billie Shane (Greenbaum). In a book published the year of Greenbaum's death, Don Knotts recalled of him, "Everett would come up with lines right out of the blue that would knock you off your seat. He also had an infectious cackle that was familiar to all his friends, and he had a multitude of friends."

== Filmography ==
Year	Title	Role	Notes
1966	The Ghost and Mr. Chicken	Man Saying 'Attaboy Luther'	Voice, Uncredited
1993	Trouble Bound	Old Man	
