= Jim Fritzell =

American screenwriter

- Born: James Gustave Fritzell; February 19, 1920; San Francisco, California, US
- Died: March 9, 1979 (aged 59); Los Angeles, California, US
- Occupations: TV and film screenwriter
- Years active: 1953–1979
- Spouse: Ruth J. DeGuerre

Jim Fritzell (February 19, 1920 – March 9, 1979) was an American television and film screenwriter.

== Personal background ==
James Gustave Fritzell was born on February 19, 1920. He died on March 9, 1979, in Los Angeles, California. He is buried at Cypress Lawn Memorial Park in Colma, San Mateo County, California.

== Career ==
In a 22–year creative partnership, Everett Greenbaum and Fritzell won a total of three Writers' Guild awards and four Emmy Award nominations, collaborating on more than 150 scripts. These included The Real McCoys (1957–62), The Andy Griffith Show (1960–68) and the CBS TV series M*A*S*H, for which they wrote 35 episodes. He was nominated for outstanding comedy teleplay for the Season 6 premiere, "Fade Out, Fade In".

While he primarily wrote for television, he also wrote several films with Greenbaum: Good Neighbor Sam, The Ghost and Mr. Chicken, The Shakiest Gun in the West, Angel in My Pocket, and The Reluctant Astronaut.
