= The Reluctant Astronaut =

1967 film by Edward Montagne

- Theatrical release poster
- Directed by: Edward Montagne
- Written by: Jim Fritzell; Everett Greenbaum
- Produced by: Edward Montagne
- Starring: Don Knotts; Leslie Nielsen; Joan Freeman
- Cinematography: Rex Wimpy
- Edited by: Sam E. Waxman
- Music by: Vic Mizzy
- Production company: Universal Pictures
- Distributed by: Universal Pictures
- Release date: June 16, 1967
- Running time: 103 minutes
- Country: United States
- Language: English
- Box office: $1,500,000 (US/ Canada)

The Reluctant Astronaut is a 1967 American comedy film produced and directed by Edward Montagne and starring Don Knotts in a story about a carnival ride operator who is hired as a janitor at the Manned Spacecraft Center in Houston and is eventually sent into space.

Comedian Knotts had won several Emmy Awards as small-town comic sheriff's deputy Barney Fife in the 1960–1968 television sitcom The Andy Griffith Show but left the show as a regular at the end of its fifth season (1964–1965) to pursue a career in feature films with Universal Pictures. The Reluctant Astronaut followed Knotts' first Universal film venture, The Ghost and Mr. Chicken (1966). Actor Paul Hartman appears in the film and would later star in The Andy Griffith Show. The film's screenplay writers Jim Fritzell and Everett Greenbaum had served as teleplay writers for the television series.

== Plot ==
In the mid-1960s, Roy Fleming is fairground operator of a kiddie-spaceship ride in Sweetwater, Missouri. Despite being 35 years old, he still lives with his parents and suffers from extreme acrophobia (fear of heights). His father, Arbuckle "Buck" Fleming, a World War I veteran, wants better things for his son, so he sends an application to NASA. Roy later learns from his mother that NASA has accepted him as a "WB-1074," which, unbeknownst to the Flemings, is a janitorial job.

When Roy arrives at the Manned Spacecraft Center in Houston, he accepts the disappointment of his job and unsuccessfully tries to explain things to his family back home, who believe that he is an astronaut. Meanwhile, he is befriended by veteran astronaut Major Fred Gifford. When Buck and his pals make a surprise visit to Houston, Roy dons Gifford's space suit in an effort to fool his domineering father. The ruse fails after Roy wreaks havoc on NASA's equipment, ultimately resulting in his termination after an unauthorized rocket sled ride. Buck returns to Missouri embarrassed and disappointed.

To tout the reliability of their automated spacecraft, the Russians plan to send an untrained civilian into space within 48 hours. NASA moves quickly to beat the Russian timeline with its own counterpart. Gifford suggests Roy and finds him in a local bar. Roy's acrophobia makes him a reluctant participant, but the launch is successful. National newscasts inform Roy's family and his girlfriend, Ellie, of his mission. Buck believes Roy's janitorial job was a cover for security purposes. During some eating experiments, Roy inadvertently gets peanut butter into the guidance system and is in danger of being marooned in space. He remembers the retro rockets speech from his role as "Mr. Spaceman" on the amusement park ride and launches them, bringing the capsule safely home. Roy is hailed as a hero, and marries Ellie. As the plane carrying Roy and Ellie to their honeymoon destination takes off from Sweetwater, Roy is seen hiding in bushes, afraid to board the plane, and hoping Ellie has a good time.

== Cast ==
- Don Knotts as kiddie-ride operator Roy Fleming
- Leslie Nielsen as Major Fred Gifford
- Joan Freeman as Roy's girlfriend Ellie Jackson
- Arthur O'Connell as Roy's father Buck Fleming
- Frank McGrath as Buck's friend Plank
- Paul Hartman as Buck's friend Rush
- Jeanette Nolan as Roy's mother Mrs. Fleming
- Robert F. Simon as Cervantes
- Burt Mustin as Ned (uncredited)
- Jesse White as Space Center janitorial supervisor Donelli (Note: Tom Knotts, Don's son, played one of the children (uncredited) in the "Kiddieland" carnival scene.)
- Nydia Westman as Aunt Zana

== Production ==
Although the majority of The Reluctant Astronaut was photographed at Universal Studios, Stage 30, location shooting at Johnson and Kennedy Space Centers, along with stock footage of real spacecraft was spliced into the film. The "Kiddieland" carnival scenes at the beginning of the film were filmed at the Universal Studios Courthouse Square, Backlot, Universal City, California. Filming was completed on September 26, 1966.

== Reception ==
The Reluctant Astronaut had its premiere on January 25, 1967, at Houston, Texas, just two days before the Apollo 1 tragedy that killed three astronauts at the LC-34 pad at Cape Canaveral Air Force Station (CCAFS). According to Knotts' 1998 autobiography, the tragic Apollo 1 fire led to Universal Pictures being skeptical about releasing a comedy on space travel so soon after the tragedy. Although not as popular as his first film ventures, The Incredible Mr. Limpet (1964) and The Ghost and Mr. Chicken (1966), due to its connection to the Apollo program, The Reluctant Astronaut still was a popular children's film and was frequently shown on weekend afternoons.

== Accolades ==
Knotts was nominated for the 1967 Golden Laurel Male Comedy Performance Award for his role in The Reluctant Astronaut. For the benefits in publicity for their programs, NASA also named Knotts, an "Honorary Recruiter". The "Reluctant Astro-Nut" ice cream was introduced by Baskin-Robbins to promote the film.

== See also ==
- List of American films of 1967
