= The Shakiest Gun in the West =

1968 film by Alan Rafkin

- Theatrical release poster
- Directed by: Alan Rafkin
- Written by: Jim Fritzell; Everett Greenbaum
- Based on: The Paleface by Frank Tashlin; Edmund Hartmann
- Produced by: Edward Montagne
- Starring: Don Knotts; Barbara Rhoades; Jackie Coogan
- Cinematography: Andrew Jackson
- Edited by: Tony Martinelli
- Music by: Vic Mizzy
- Color process: Technicolor
- Production company: Universal Pictures
- Distributed by: Universal Pictures
- Release date: July 10, 1968
- Running time: 101 minutes
- Country: United States
- Language: English
- Box office: $1,650,000 (US/ Canada)

The Shakiest Gun in the West is a 1968 American Western comedy film starring Don Knotts. It was directed by Alan Rafkin and written by Jim Fritzell and Everett Greenbaum. The film is a remake of The Paleface, a 1948 film starring Bob Hope and Jane Russell.

== Plot ==
Jesse W. Heywood graduates from dental school in Philadelphia in 1870 and goes west to become an American frontier dentist. As a city slicker, he finds himself bungling in a new environment.

On his way west, his stagecoach is held up and robbed by two masked bandits. A posse catches one of them, Penelope "Bad Penny" Cushing. Facing prison, Penelope is offered a pardon if she will track down a ring of gun smugglers that also involves a local Indian tribe. Because the wagon train she plans to accompany will not permit single women to join, she tricks Heywood into a sham marriage. This is after her prearranged marshal husband is murdered. They then join the wagon train with approval of the leader of the train.

After setting camp that night, Jesse, excited for his wedding night and not realizing that his marriage is a sham, looks for Penelope, who is investigating crates of "Bibles" that the preacher and his minion have in their wagon. Jesse startles Penelope, alerting Basch, Gant and most of the camp. Her investigation foiled, she makes up a story that she could not sleep alone with Jesse on guard duty on her wedding night and they both return to their wagon with everyone believing her tale.

As the wagon train draws near the town, Indians attack. Jesse fumbles with his six-shooter, but Penelope expertly shoots the attackers. Jesse, believing that he was responsible, is proud of his accomplishment and is treated as a hero by the wagon train and the entire town, which hears of his deeds.

The preacher Gant, believing Jesse to be an undercover federal agent, hires the local outlaw Arnold the Kid to challenge Jesse to a gunfight. Jesse practices for the gunfight while Penelope meets her contact in town. Around the corner, Arnold listens for Jesse to use up his rounds on his six-shooter pistol, and after the sixth shot challenges Jesse, even offering him the first shot. Penelope, feeling pity for Jesse, shoots Arnold from a window. Doc Heywood's legend grows.

Later that night, Penelope leaves to search the church where the preacher resides, and inside confirms that the "Bibles" crates actually have guns and ammunition. Jesse comes in the church searching for her, and Gant and Basch overhear their conversation. Knowing that Penelope is an agent, they set their sights on her. Back at the hotel Penelope explains her situation and Jesse offers his help, believing himself to be a crack shot. Penelope, not wanting Jesse to hurt himself, tells him the truth about her assistance on the wagon train and with Arnold. Penelope leaves, apologizing to Jesse, who is heartbroken.

Penelope tries to leave on horseback for federal troops' help but is kidnapped by the preacher and his minion Basch and their Indian friends, who take her to the Indian village outside of town. Jesse walks into the saloon and admits the truth of his deeds to the town, who turn their backs on him. As a drunken Jesse stumbles out of the saloon, he sees Penelope being taken out of town by the preacher. Jesse follows them to the Indian village to save Penelope.

In disguise as an Indian woman after joining the tribe, and after some thoughtful maneuvering, Jesse frees Penelope but suggests they wait for the entire village to get even more drunk before making their escape. Jesse's identity is revealed after two Indians have a fight over him/her and the preacher and his minion challenge Jesse to a gunfight. Jesse is confident because he knows Penelope is armed and ready in a teepee. As Penelope sets her sights with her rifle, she is quietly and begrudgingly taken away by the carpenter, her contact in town, an undercover marshal, and his friend as multiple shots ring out. Jesse stands victorious with the preacher and his minion shot dead by himself without knowing that Penny did not help this time. Jesse is surrounded by the chief and his tribe and appears doomed.

Back at the town, the town is barricaded waiting for an Indian attack and the townspeople are ready for battle. To everyone's surprise, Jesse rides in with the chief and some tribesmen. Jesse has made peace with the chief and replaced his missing teeth. He orders the chief a rare steak and is reunited with Penelope, who hugs him, and shortly thereafter Penny has to knock out the enamored Indian who has come to town trying to reclaim Jesse the squaw as his.

== Cast ==
- Don Knotts as Dr. Jesse W. Heywood
- Barbara Rhoades as Penelope 'Bad Penny' Cushings
- Jackie Coogan as Matthew Basch
- Don "Red" Barry as Rev. Zachary Gant (as Donald Barry)
- Ruth McDevitt as Olive
- Frank McGrath as Mr. Remington
- Terry Wilson as Welsh
- Carl Ballantine as Abel Swanson
- Pat Morita as Wong
- Dub Taylor as Pop McGovern
- Edward Faulkner as Marshall Huggins (attorney)
- Joseph Perry as Indian infatuated with Jesse dressed as squaw

== Production and release ==
Filming for the movie, which cost $1.2 million to produce, completed on June 12, 1967, and it opened in Los Angeles on June 26, 1968.

== Home media ==
The film was originally released on VHS in 1988 by GoodTimes Home Video and re-released on VHS in 1996 by MCA Home Video. It was later released on DVD in 2003 by Universal Pictures.

== In popular culture ==
The Shakiest Gun in the West has been cited as one of a number of films which the 2011 animated film Rango consciously draws on.

== See also ==
- List of American films of 1968
