= Whoopee cap =

Style of hat or headwear

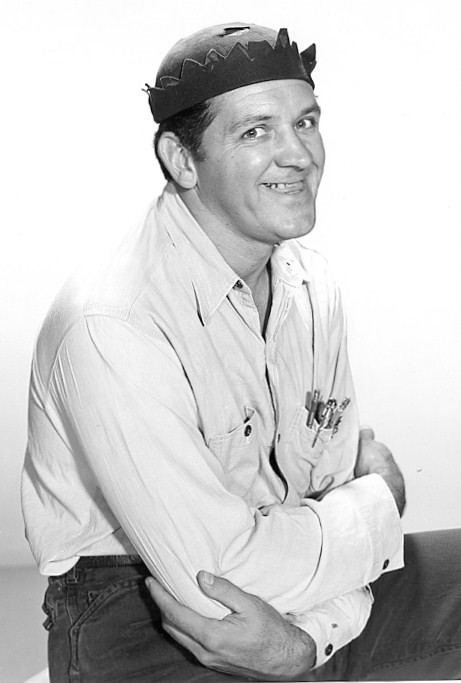
George Lindsey as Goober Pyle wearing a typical whoopee cap.

A whoopee cap is a style of headwear popular among some young people in the mid-20th century in the United States. It was often made from a man's felt fedora hat with the brim trimmed with a scalloped cut and turned up. Often, children wearing the cap would decorate it with buttons, badges, or bottle caps. In the 1920s and 1930s, such caps often indicated the wearer was a mechanic. Once popularized, the cap began being manufactured and sold.

The style of cap is also referred to as a palookaville cap, Kingpin, button beanie, felt crown, or Jughead hat. The last of these names is in reference to Jughead Jones of the Archie Comics series, for whom the cap is a staple. Other notable depictions of the cap include the ones worn by Goober Pyle of The Andy Griffith Show as well as characters in the films of the Dead End Kids. It also appears in modernized form made out of a knit beanie on the television show Riverdale.

== See also ==
- Beanie
- Fedora
- List of hat styles
