= Propeller head =

Propeller head may refer to:

- Propeller beanie, a seamed cap with a decorative propeller on top
- Propellerheads, a British big beat musical ensemble, formed in 1995
- An alternate term for a propeller hub, the part of a ship or aircraft propeller where the blades attach
