= The Fun Girls =

Fictional recurring characters on The Andy Griffith Show

The Fun Girls "Daphne and Skippy"
- The Andy Griffith Show character
- "The Fun Girls", (left to right) Daphne portrayed by Jean Carson and Skippy by Joyce Jameson
- First appearance: "Barney Mends a Broken Heart" (1962)
- Last appearance: "The Arrest of the Fun Girls" (1965)
- Portrayed by: Skippy by Joyce Jameson and Daphne by Jean Carson

The Fun Girls ("Daphne and Skippy") are fictional recurring characters on The Andy Griffith Show, an American TV sitcom from the 1960s. Unlike many of the characters in Mayberry, the Fun Girls were rather lively and more eager to push the envelope when it came to seeking personal pleasure.

== Overview ==
"The Fun Girls" (sardonically nicknamed by Thelma Lou) were a pair of fun-loving women: the giggly Skippy (played by Joyce Jameson) and the gravel-voiced Daphne (played by Jean Carson). The two hailed from Mount Pilot, the "big city" near the small town of Mayberry. They were flirtatious, they loved dancing, driving fast and to have "fun,"(a potential reference to more inappropriate activity) and their appearance in town almost always meant trouble for Sheriff Andy Taylor and Deputy Barney Fife (both of whom had steady girlfriends). Skippy was characterized by her high-pitched, grating laugh and was generally attracted to Barney (whom she incessantly called "Bernie"). Daphne was known for her throaty greeting "Hello Doll" and was attracted to Andy.

The first appearance of the Fun Girls resulted in Andy receiving a black-eye during a scuffle with Daphne's erstwhile boyfriend.

On one occasion, Andy and Barney had to cancel their dates with their girlfriends Helen Crump and Thelma Lou respectively so they could work late at the courthouse, only to be interrupted by Skippy and Daphne. Andy and Barney innocently tried to escort the two back to Mt. Pilot so they could finish their work, but were spotted in the car with them by their girlfriends. To get back at them, Helen and Thelma Lou went out with cousins Gomer and Goober Pyle, and in turn, Andy and Barney went out with the Fun Girls. By the end of the day, it was apparent that Gomer and Goober were better matches for the Fun Girls as they genuinely seemed to enjoy each other's company.

Their last appearance has them coming to Mayberry to have a fun time with Andy and Barney, much to their chagrin as they want nothing to do with the girls. They try to keep them occupied before leaving to go on dates with Helen and Thelma Lou, but Barney is forced to stay to make sure they don't wreck the courthouse. Thelma Lou and Helen discover the girls in the courthouse and the men in compromising positions, they leave in a huff. Fed up, Andy explodes at them, telling them to get out of town, which the Fun Girls do, much to Skippy's dismay. The men make up with their girlfriends and have a date night at Andy's house, only to discover the Fun Girls there, putting the men back at the bottom of the barrel with their girlfriends.

The Fun Girls made three appearances on The Andy Griffith Show from 1962 to 1965:

Ep.#	Episode title	Directed by	Written by	Airdate
68 (Season 3 Episode 6)	"Barney Mends a Broken Heart"	Bob Sweeney	Aaron Ruben	November 5, 1962
123 (Season 4 Episode 27)	"The Fun Girls"	Coby Ruskin	Aaron Ruben	April 13, 1964
155 (Season 5 Episode 28)	"The Arrest of the Fun Girls"	Theodore J. Flicker	Richard M. Powell	April 5, 1965

Jean Carson also appeared in the episode "Convicts at Large", playing a man-hating, escaped prisoner convicted of spousal abuse.
