= The Billy Barnes Revue =

- Cover of Original Cast Recording
- Music: Billy Barnes
- Lyrics: Billy Barnes
- Book: Bob Rodgers
- Productions: 1959 Los Angeles; 1959 Off Broadway; 1959 Broadway

The Billy Barnes Revue is a 1959 musical comedy revue with music and lyrics by Billy Barnes and sketches by Bob Rodgers. The revue premiered in Los Angeles in 1959 and went on to be produced both on Broadway and Off Broadway.

The show is remembered for its acclaimed cast of newcomers, including Bert Convy and Ken Berry. Barnes continued to produce successful revues in Los Angeles.

== Background ==
In 1952, actress Joyce Jameson graduated from UCLA and married songwriter Billy Barnes. Their first collaboration was a new musical comedy called Baby Face O'Flynn, for which she wrote the book and played the lead role and he wrote the music and lyrics. The show opened in the summer of 1952 at the Gallery Stage Theatre in Los Angeles. The run of the show was cut short when Jameson became pregnant. For the next few years, Jameson found work, first by writing television scripts, and then by playing small parts in films and on television shows. She and Barnes were divorced during this period, but continued to work together into the 1960s.

== Productions ==
=== Los Angeles ===
In 1956, Barnes and sketch writer/director Bob Rodgers opened The Billy Barnes Revue at the "hole-in-the-ground" Cabaret Concert Theatre in Los Angeles. According to Barnes, "It's a nightclub, and people said that’s where we belonged. We were advised not to get ambitious." Producer Paul Gregory planned to bring the production to New York in January 1957 under the title Focus No. 1, but the transfer did not happen.

At one point, some producers decided to tour the show throughout California with just the music and no sketches, a venture which was quickly dropped. Meanwhile, the original show continued performances at the Cabaret Concert Theatre for nearly two years. It then played briefly at the Mocambo and the Crescendo in Los Angeles and at the hungry i in San Francisco. In 1958, Jameson, who had left the show to pursue her television career, returned to Los Angeles from New York City (where she had been appearing as the "honey girl" on The Steve Allen Show and as a regular on Spike Jones' NBC series, Club Oasis). She rejoined the cast of the show when it opened at the Las Palmas Theater in October 1958. When the original cast took the show to New York City eight months later, a new cast, including Jo Anne Worley, continued the run for a total of 48 weeks.

=== Off-Broadway ===
The Billy Barnes Revue, with original cast members Joyce Jameson, Bert Convy, Patti Regan, Ken Berry, Ann Guilbert, Jackie Joseph, Len Weinrib and sketch writer/director Bob Rodgers, opened at the York Playhouse in New York City on June 9, 1959. The production was produced by George Eckstein (Ann Guilbert's husband) in association with Bob Reese. Billy Barnes was the musical director, with Armin Hoffman on the second piano.

The New York Times review by Lewis Funke was mixed: "A crisply played and highly polished little entertainment called The Billy Barnes Revue arrived at the York Theatre on First Avenue last night..." but Funke found the material lacking "...the trouble is that they have not given the material the edge, sharpness and point of view that would have made it truly comic". Although Funke had high praise for the cast, he added "...Too often are the performers superior to the writers and the composers." Overall, however, the reviews were largely positive, and 35 additional investors contributed the extra money needed to move the show from the York Playhouse to Broadway.

=== Broadway ===
The Billy Barnes Revue transferred to the John Golden Theatre on August 4, 1959. Barnes was so unknown in New York, that many people confused him with the actress Binnie Barnes. "It's discouraging to stand in front of the theatre before the show," Barnes told a reporter, "and hear people say, 'I'm looking forward to seeing Binnie Barnes again. I haven't seen her in years.'"

To make way for the British revue, At the Drop of a Hat, the show closed on September 26, 1959 at the Golden and transferred on September 28 to the Lyceum Theatre, where it had to close on October 21 to make way for a new play, The Flowering Cherry. The production ran for a total of 87 performances.

The Off Broadway cast reprised their roles on Broadway. Later cast replacements in the off Broadway production included Jo Anne Worley, Charles Nelson Reilly and Larry Hovis.

One of the show's songs, "Too Long At The Fair" was recorded by Barbra Streisand, Sue Raney and Patti Page, among others. Decca Records released an Original Cast Album of the production in September 1959.

=== Off Broadway Again ===
Following its three-week run at the Lyceum Theatre, rather than closing down for good, the show moved off-Broadway again to the Carnegie Hall Playhouse on October 20, 1959. Producers George Cayley, George Brandt and Samuel J. Friedman acquired the rights from Eckstein, who remained with the production as stage manager and performed the role vacated by Bert Convy.

A controversy erupted when Barnes, Guilbert, Berry, Joseph, Regan, Rodgers, Weinrib and Eckstein flew to Chicago to tape an episode of ABC-TV's Playboy's Penthouse, produced by Hugh Hefner's Playboy Magazine, and failed to make their flight back to New York in time for the Tuesday, October 27 performance. As a result, the Tuesday night performance was cancelled and $800 had to be returned to the ticket holders.

Eckstein sent a telegram to the producers stating that the cast had made a "frantically conscientious effort to return to New York by curtain time as numerous impartial witnesses can testify; a dispatching error resulted in misconnections," but rather than simply recognizing the value of the network television publicity, the management filed a complaint with Actors' Equity Association and the American Federation of Musicians (of which Barnes was a member). "There’s no excuse for missing a show," declared the producers' lawyer, Benjamin Schankman. "They shouldn't have gone to Chicago if they could not arrange to get back in time. An agreement is an agreement."

Although one of the producers, Samuel J. Friedman, denied that their decision was a retaliatory action, two weeks later, the entire cast (except Virginia de Luce, who had replaced Jameson) was replaced by Ronnie Cunningham, Arlene Fontana, Jane Johnston, Larry Hovis, James Inman, Charles Nelson Reilly and Tom Williams.

The cast change proved to be a major mistake and the show closed on November 28, 1959 after just six weeks at the Carnegie Hall Playhouse. Ironically, the promotional appearance on Playboy's Penthouse by the original cast members did not air until Saturday, December 5, one week after the show had closed.

=== United Kingdom ===
On 28 March 1960 the British theatre producer Harold Fielding presented The Billy Barnes Revue at the King's Theatre in Edinburgh, and a week later, on 4 April, it opened at the Lyric Theatre in Hammersmith, West London. It closed on April 23, after just 23 performances. American cast members Ann Guilbert, Joyce Jameson, Jackie Joseph and Patti Regan were joined by British comedians and actors Ted Rogers, Ronnie Stevens, Terence Cooper and Richard Owens.

== Sequel ==
Several of the original cast members (Berry, Joseph, Jameson and Regan) returned to Los Angeles and began work on a new revue, The Billy Barnes People. The Billy Barnes People opened on Broadway at the Royale Theatre on June 13, 1961 and closed four days later after only seven performances.

== Sketches and musical numbers ==
ACT 1

- "Do a Revue" (The Company)
- "Where Are Your Children?" (Ken Berry, Bert Convy, Jackie Joseph, Ann Guilbert, Patti Regan and Len Weinrib)
- "Las Vegas"
  - Herman (Rob Rodgers)
  - Girl with Hat (Ann Guilbert)
  - Tanya (Joyce Jameson)
  - Her Fellas (Bert Convy and Ken Berry)
- "Medic"
  - Surgeon (Len Weinrib)
  - Staff (Ann Guilbert and Patti Regan)
- "Foolin' Ourselves" (Bert Convy and Ken Berry)
- "Safari à la Marilyn"
  - Papa (Len Weinrib)
  - Arthur (Bob Rodgers)
  - Marilyn (Joyce Jameson)
- "The Pembrooke Story"
  - Arthur (Ken Berry)
  - Edythe (Ann Guilbert)
  - Miss O'Brien (Jackie Joseph)
  - John (Bert Convy)
  - Peter (Len Weinrib)
- "Whatever" (Patti Regan)
- "City of the Angels"
  - Lily (Joyce Jameson)
  - Lolly (Ann Guilbert)
  - Dolly (Jackie Joseph)
- "Listen to the Beat!"
  - Host (Len Weinrib)
  - Jack (Ken Berry)
  - Mary Lou (Ann Guilbert)
  - Dean (Bert Convy)
  - Sarah (Joyce Jameson)
  - The Prophet (Len Weinrib)
  - Beatniks (Bob Rodgers, Patti Regan and Jackie Joseph)
- "Home in Mississippi"
  - Maggie (Patti Regan)
  - Big Daddy (Len Weinrib)
  - Big Mama (Ann Guilbert)
  - Brick (Bob Rodgers)
  - No-neck Monsters (Themselves)
- "Tyler My Boy" (Bert Convy)
- "Whatever Happened" (Patti Regan)
- "The Thirties"
  - Narrator (Bob Rodgers)
  - Peddler (Patti Regan)
  - Fred (Ken Berry)
  - Ginger (Joyce Jameson)
  - Forgotten Woman (Ann Guilbert)
  - Forgotten Man (Len Weinrib)
  - Shirley (Joyce Jameson)
  - Daddy (Bert Convy)
  - Step-Mommy (Patti Regan)
  - Gold Digger (Jackie Joseph)
  - J.N. (Len Weinrib)
  - Sam (Ken Berry)
  - Ruby (Ann Guilbert)
  - Dick (Bert Convy)
  - Jeanette (Joyce Jameson)
  - Nelson (Bob Rodgers)

ACT 2

- "A Dissertation on Transportation; or, It All Started with the Wheel"
  - Principal (Bob Rodgers)
  - P.T.A. Principal (Joyce Jameson)
  - Teacher (Patti Regan)
  - Sweet Little Girl (Jackie Joseph)
  - Sour Little Girl (Ann Guilbert)
  - Teacher's Pet (Ken Berry)
  - Bully (Len Weinrib)
  - Bert Convy (Bert Convy)
- "The Fights" (Introduced by Ann Guilbert)
  - Shirley (Joyce Jameson)
  - Harry (Bob Rodgers)
- "The Vamp and Friends"
  - Vamp (Ann Guilbert)
  - Champ (Ken Berry)
  - Tramp (Patti Regan)
  - Camp (Len Weinrib)
- "Blocks"
  - Husband (Bob Rodgers)
  - Wife (Jackie Joseph)
- "Hellahahana"
  - Natives (Bert Convy, Ken Berry, Joyce Jameson, Len Weinrib and Jackie Joseph)
  - Turista (Ann Guilbert)
- "What Ever Happened To" (Patti Regan)
- "World at Large"
  - Moderator (Bert Convy)
- World at Large No. 1
  - Rosabelle Haley (Joyce Jameson)
  - Warden (Len Weinrib)
  - Matron (Ann Guilbert)
- Station Break
  - Fire Prevention Queen (Patti Regan)
- World at Large No. 2
  - Mr. Lernstein (Bob Rodgers)
  - Choral Group (Choral Group)
- World at Large Preview
  - Oed (Ken Berry)
  - Jo (Patti Regan)
- "Too Long at the Fair" (Joyce Jameson)
- "Once of Those Days"
  - Poor Soul (Len Weinrib)
  - Ads (Bert Convy, Jackie Joseph and Ken Berry)
- Finale (The Company)

== Selections on the Cast Album ==
Act I

- Do A Revue (The Company)
- Where Are Your Children? (The Company)
- Foolin' Ourselves (Bert Convy and Ken Berry)
- Las Vegas (Joyce Jameson with Bert Convy and Ken Berry; Introduction by Rob Rodgers and Girls
- What Ever Happened? No. 1 (Patti Regan)
- Too Long At The Fair (Joyce Jameson with Soprano Obbligato by Jackie Joseph)
- Listen To The Beat (The Company featuring Len Weinrib)

Act II

- City of the Angels (Joyce Jameson, Ann Guilbert and Jackie Joseph)
- Blocks (Bob Rodgers and Jackie Joseph)
- What Ever Happened? No. 2 (Patti Regan)
- The Fights (Joyce Jameson and Bob Rodgers)
- Tyler My Boy (Bert Convy)
- What Ever Happened? No. 3 (Patti Regan)
- One of Those Days - Finale (Jackie Joseph, Bert Convy, Ken Berry and Company)
