= Billy Barnes (composer) =

Songwriter and actor (1927-2012)

- Born: January 27, 1927; Los Angeles, California, U.S.
- Died: September 25, 2012 (aged 85); Los Angeles, California, U.S.
- Occupations: Composer, writer
- Spouse(s): Joyce Jameson (m. 1952; div. 1957)
- Partner(s): Richard Tyler Jordan (198?–2012, his death)
- Children: 1

Billy Barnes (January 27, 1927 – September 25, 2012) was a composer, lyricist and actor from Los Angeles, California. Barnes may be best known for his theatrical revues and his recurring role as Mr. Edlin on the television series Mad About You.

== Career ==
Barnes started writing musical comedy sketches while still in high school, and continued while at UCLA. He started collaborating in college with Bob Rodgers, and their first professional musical comedy revue, a Cabaret Concert Show, was staged in 1956 in Los Angeles. Barnes continued with theatrical revues, including The Billy Barnes Revue, Billy Barnes' People, Billy Barnes' Party, Billy Barnes' L.A., and Billy Barnes' Hollywood. Other productions with Barnes' songs include Movie Star, and Blame It on the Movies (1988).

His revues were the springboard for many comics and singers, including Bert Convy, Ken Berry, Jo Anne Worley, Steve Franken, Jackie Joseph, Ann Morgan Guilbert, David Ketchum, and his then wife Joyce Jameson.

For television, Barnes wrote special material and original musical production numbers for Rowan & Martin's Laugh-In, The Danny Kaye Show, The Sonny & Cher Comedy Hour, Cher and The Carol Burnett Show. He wrote opening production numbers for several Academy Awards telecasts. He has composed comedic and topical songs for many of show business's greatest personalities including Lucille Ball, Bette Davis and Angela Lansbury. He wrote the songs for the 1976 television musical adaptation of Pinocchio starring Sandy Duncan.

Barnes' hit songs includes "(Have I Stayed) Too Long at the Fair" recorded by Patti Page and by Barbra Streisand on her 1963 album The Second Barbra Streisand Album, and "Something Cool", first recorded in 1954 by jazz vocalist June Christy.

Barnes had a recurring acting role on the television series Mad About You in the 1990s as "Mr. Edlin", the musical director and pianist of a community theatre.

== Personal life ==
Barnes married actress Joyce Jameson in the 1950s, and the couple had one child together, son Tyler, before their divorce. Barnes and Richard T. Jordan were life partners from the early 1980s and married in 2010. Barnes died from complications associated with Alzheimer's disease, on September 25, 2012.

== Awards and recognition ==
Barnes received The Los Angeles Theatre Alliance Governor's Award for his lifetime achievement in the theatre.

The 2013–15 HBO series Getting On is set in the fictional Mt. Palms Hospital's "Billy Barnes Extended Care Unit" in Long Beach, California.
