= Frontier Doctor =

American television series

- Starring: Rex Allen
- Country of origin: United States
- No. of seasons: 1
- No. of episodes: 39

Production
- Running time: 30 minutes

Original release
- Network: Syndication
- Release: September 26, 1958 – June 3, 1959

Frontier Doctor is an American Western television series starring Rex Allen that aired in syndication from September 26, 1958, until June 20, 1959. The series was also known as Unarmed and Man of the West.

== Synopsis ==
Frontier Doctor follows the exploits of a physician, Dr. Bill Baxter, who is based in Rising Springs in the Arizona Territory during the early 20th century. He rides in a buggy with his black bag and encounters more than his share of trouble as he aids many who cross his path. Baxter often finds difficulty with his patients, such as the outlaw Butch Cassidy. Stafford Repp occasionally appeared as Sheriff Brawley.

== Other guest stars ==
- Jack Albertson as J. B. Drummond, Lee Van Cleef as Deputy Sid Carver, aka Bill Dalton, and Tyler McVey as Sheriff Ed Wilson, in "The Great Stagecoach Robbery" (1958)
- Chris Alcaide as Ed Slater in "Broken Barrier" (1959)
- Diane Brewster as Marian Dell in "Law of the Badlands" (1959)
- Jean Carson as Flo Warren in "The Big Frame Up" (1959)
- Mary Castle, formerly of Stories of the Century, appeared in "The Confidence Gang" (1959).
- Mason Alan Dinehart as Lonnie Davis in "The Homesteaders" and as Miller in "The Twisted Road" (both 1959)
- Ann Doran as Ma 'Dallas' Bell in "Drifting Sands" (1959)
- Francis DeSales as Tom Lynch in "Double Boomerang" (1958)
- Leo Gordon as Zip Wyatt in "Three Wanted Men" (1958)
- Ron Hagerthy, another cast member of Sky King, portrays Pa Helbrog, with Alan Dinehart, III, as Lonny Davis, in "The Homesteaders" (1959).
- Stacy Harris as Ed Miller in "Mystery of the Black Stallion" (1958)
- Don C. Harvey as Sam Peterson, Gregg Palmer as Charlie Pierce, and Jackie Loughery, formerly of Judge Roy Bean, as Savannah Merrick, in "Crooked Circle" (1958)
- John Hoyt as the rancher Clete Barron in "Trouble in Paradise Valley" (1958)
- Michael Landon as Jim Mason, with Frank Gorshin as Hank Butts, in "Shadow of Belle Starr" (1959)
- Eve Miller as Paula Mason in "Shadow of Belle Starr" (1959)
- Dennis Moore as Walker in "Three Wanted Men" (1958)
- Slim Pickens in "Bittercreek Gang" (1959)
- Rhodes Reason as Black Jack in "The Homesteaders" (1959)
- Gloria Saunders in "Iron Trail Ambush" (1958)
- Joe Turkel as Sear Middleton in "The Big Gamblers" (1959)
- Pierre Watkin as Dr. Breen of Samaritan Hospital and Lane Bradford as Gino in "San Francisco Story" (1958)
- Frank Wilcox as Colonel Dodge in "Man to Man" (1959)
- Morgan Woodward as Rafe Stafford in "Strange Cargo" (1959).
- Carleton G. Young as Sharp Middleton in "The Big Gamblers" (1959).

== Production ==
Episodes of Frontier Doctor used much stock footage from Republic Pictures.

Edward J. White was the producer, and William Witney was the director.

== Critical response ==
A review in the trade publication Variety said that the premiere episode seemed to include almost every Western film cliche and said that the show seemed better suited to children with the "promise of attracting little but the hardbitten Western fan" as far as adults were concerned. Allen was described as "capable and personable, if hardly inspired" in the lead. The reviewer also noted that the Indians' headdresses and housing were not appropriate for Apaches.
