= Howard McNear =

American actor (1905–1969)

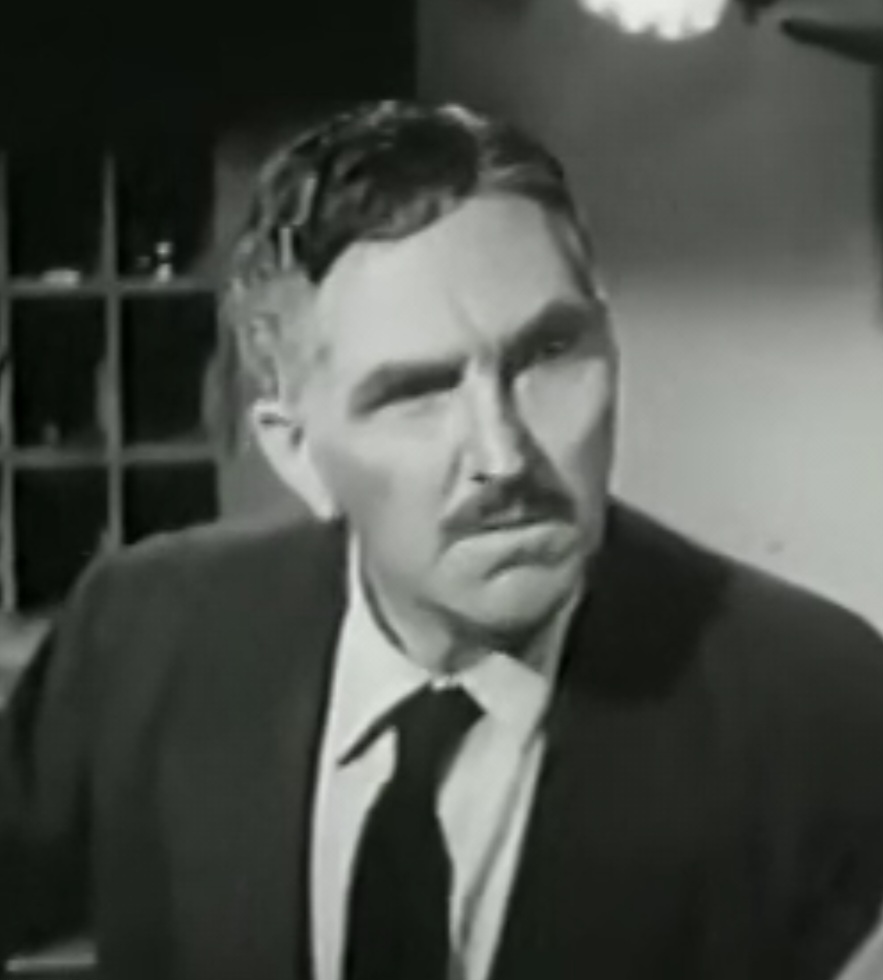
- McNear in Four Star Playhouse, a Four Star Television series (1952)
- Born: Howard Terbell McNear; January 27, 1905; Los Angeles, California, U.S.
- Died: January 3, 1969 (aged 63); Los Angeles, California, U.S.
- Occupation: Actor
- Years active: 1937–1967
- Spouse: Helen
- Children: 1

Howard Terbell McNear (January 27, 1905 – January 3, 1969) was an American stage, screen, and radio character actor. He is best remembered as the original voice of Doc Adams in the radio version of Gunsmoke and as Floyd Lawson (Floyd the Barber) on The Andy Griffith Show (1961–1967).

== Career ==
McNear studied at the Oatman School of Theater and later joined a stock company in San Diego. He worked in radio from the late 1930s, including in the 1937–1940 radio serial Speed Gibson of the International Secret Police as ace operator Clint Barlow. While he was effective in authoritative roles, he gravitated more toward character roles, often comic. He enlisted as a private in the United States Army Air Corps on November 17, 1942, during World War II.

He created the role of Doc Charles Adams on CBS Radio's Gunsmoke (1952–1961). He was featured in many other CBS radio programs before Gunsmoke, such as frequent roles on the popular radio detective series Yours Truly, Johnny Dollar between 1955 and 1960. Other radio credits included appearances on the anthologies Escape and Suspense.

McNear's film debut was in an uncredited role in the 1953 film Escape from Fort Bravo. In 1956, he appeared in the episode "The Pest Hole" (S1E24) in the TV version of Gunsmoke. In a 1958 episode of Leave it to Beaver, McNear made a TV appearance as a barber named "Andy", who gave Wally his first shave. During his career, he appeared in over 100 film and television guest spots. In 1959, McNear portrayed Dr. Dompierre in the film Anatomy of a Murder, who testifies about collecting rape evidence. In a 1960 episode of Peter Gunn, titled "A Slight Touch of Homicide", McNear used the mannerisms he later developed as Floyd the barber to play Barnaby, a vigilante chemist who killed 15 mobsters with explosives.

In 1961, McNear was cast as the vague, chatty barber Floyd Lawson on The Andy Griffith Show. In 1963, he suffered a stroke that rendered most of the left side of his body paralyzed. He left the series for nearly a year and a half to recover. Producer Aaron Ruben suggested Howard's return to the show when he said to his colleagues, "Boy, I wish we had Howard." When the producers called the actor's home, his wife called the idea "A godsend" for her husband. McNear returned despite being unable to walk or stand, and the production crew accommodated him accordingly. Floyd was subsequently seen onscreen either seated or standing with support. Many scenes were shot with him sitting on a bench outside the barber shop, as opposed to trimming hair as before. In most of his post-stroke scenes, McNear's left hand is holding a newspaper or resting in his lap, while he moves his right arm and hand as he says his lines. In a 1964 episode, "Otis Sues the County,” McNear's character is heard, but not seen, walking into the courthouse; the next scene shows Floyd already seated in a chair. In a 1966 episode, “Wyatt Earp Rides Again,” McNear, as Floyd, is shown standing at his barber's chair using both hands to treat the hair of deputy Warren (Jack Burns); however, such appearances were rare.

In the seventh season finale of The Andy Griffith Show, "Goober's Contest", in which Floyd Lawson makes his final appearance, McNear is speaking from his parked car but an obvious double is shot from the back while driving the car away. According to Jack Dodson, who played Howard Sprague on The Andy Griffith Show, McNear began having difficulty remembering his lines and became anxious and frustrated during his last season on the program. He left the series after the seventh season in 1967; the series only ran for one more year and Lawson's barber shop and position in the show was loosely replaced by Emmett Clark, a repairman with a fix-it shop (located where the barbershop used to be) played by Paul Hartman (who continued the role in Mayberry R.F.D.). In the eighth-season episode, "Goober the Executive," Andy addresses the replacement by saying "Floyd decides he's got enough money and wants to retire, Emmett moves right in."

Earlier in 1961, McNear was uncredited in the animated title role of the AT&T instructional film, Mr. Digit and the Battle of Bubbling Brook, who taught Ethel (Peg Lynch) of Ethel and Albert about the advantages of all-number calling. Alan Bunce, who played Albert, also reprised his role in that video. In 1962 he made a guest appearance on The Twilight Zone in the episode "Hocus Pocus and Frisby". In 1964, McNear also took a role on Gunsmoke, playing Dodge City's general store owner in "Aunt Thede" (S10E13).

== Death ==
On January 3, 1969, McNear died at San Fernando Valley Veterans Hospital in Sylmar, Los Angeles at the age of 63 of complications from pneumonia caused by a stroke. He was survived by his wife Helen and his son Christopher.

== Filmography ==
Film
Year	Title	Role	Notes
1953	Escape from Fort Bravo	Watson	Uncredited
1953	The Long, Long Trailer	Joe Hittaway	Uncredited
1954	Drums Across the River	Stilwell	
1956	You Can't Run Away from It	Vernon, Second proprietor	
1956	Bundle of Joy	Mr. Appleby	
1957	Affair in Reno	James T. James	
1957	Public Pigeon No. One	Warden	
1957	The Fuzzy Pink Nightgown	John Myers	Uncredited
1958	Bell, Book and Candle	Andy White, Shep's Co-Publisher	
1959	Good Day for a Hanging	Olson	
1959	Anatomy of a Murder	Dr. Dompierre	
1959	The Big Circus	Mr. Lomax	
1959	It Started with a Kiss	Emile	Uncredited
1959	-30-	Editor	Alternative title: Deadline Midnight
1960	Heller in Pink Tights	Photographer of dead gunmen	
1960	The Last Time I Saw Archie	General Williams	
1960	Voyage to the Bottom of the Sea	Congressman Llewellyn Parker	
1961	Blue Hawaii	Mr. Chapman	
1960	The Errand Boy	Dexter Sneak	
1962	Bachelor Flat	Dr. Dylan Bowman	
1962	Follow That Dream	George	
1963	Irma la Douce	Concierge	
1963	The Wheeler Dealers	Mr. Wilson	Alternative title: Separate Beds
1963	Fun in Acapulco	Dr. John Stevers	Uncredited
1964	Kiss Me, Stupid	Mr. Pettibone	
1965	My Blood Runs Cold	Henry	
1965	Love and Kisses	Mr. Frisby	
1966	The Fortune Cookie	Mr. Cimoli	Alternative title: Meet Whiplash Willie

Television
Year	Title	Role	Notes
1950	NBC Comics	Minor role	Voice, Unknown episodes
1952–1955	Four Star Playhouse	Various roles	3 episodes
1953–1958	The George Burns and Gracie Allen Show	Mr. Jansen	7 episodes
1954	Dragnet		Episode: "The Big Threat"
1954	Topper	Judge	Episode: "County Fair"
1955	Waterfront	Mike Baxter	Episode: "The Rivals"
1955	Willy	Various roles	2 episodes
1955–1958	The Millionaire	Various roles	2 episodes
1955–1959	Schlitz Playhouse of Stars	Various roles	2 episodes
1956	Chevron Hall of Stars	Teeples	Episode: "The Bequest"
1956	The George Gobel Show	Sketch Actor	Episode #2.18
1956	It's a Great Life	Mr. Johnson	Episode: "The Charity Drive"
1956	Screen Directors Playhouse	Various roles	2 episodes
1956	Lassie	Professor Scott	Episode: "Bone"
1956	I Love Lucy	Mr. Crawford	Episode: "Little Ricky Gets Stage Fright"
1956–1957	The Brothers	Captain Sam Box	2 episodes
1956–1964	Gunsmoke	Various roles	6 episodes
1956–1957	December Bride	Various roles	3 episodes
1957	Private Secretary	Eye Doctor	Episode: "Thy Name Is Sands"
1957	Cavalcade of America	Phil	Episode: "The Last Signer"
1957	The Ford Television Theatre	Dave Carter	Episode: "The Idea Man"
1957	The Adventures of Jim Bowie	Colonel	Episode: "Country Cousin"
1957	The George Sanders Mystery Theater	Ben	Episode: "The Night I Died"
1957	Mr. Adams and Eve	Uncle Jeck	Episode: "Suspension"
1957–1958	The People's Choice	Various roles	2 episodes
1957–1961	General Electric Theater	Various roles	4 episodes
1958	The Thin Man	Mr. Dingle	Episode: "Unlucky Lucky Number"
1958	The Life of Riley	Mr. Bellflower	Episode: "Bowling Beauties"
1958	Playhouse 90	Bertram	Episode: "No Time At All"
1958	Leave It to Beaver	Andy the Barber	Episode: "The Shave"
1958–1959	Bachelor Father	Various roles	2 episodes
1958–1962	The Real McCoys	Various roles	4 episodes
1958–1959	The Lineup	Various roles	2 episodes
1958–1960	The Ann Sothern Show	Various roles	3 episodes
1958–1962	The Jack Benny Program	Various roles	7 episodes
1959	The Donna Reed Show	Wilbur Wilgus	2 episodes
1959	M Squad	Carl Hoganson	Episode: "Murder in C-Sharp Minor"
1959	Alcoa Theatre	Harry	Episode:Tom, Dick, and Harry
1959	The Adventures of Ozzie & Harriet	Mr. Folwer	Episode: "The Nelsons Decide to Move"
1959	Pony Express	Ralph Whitaker	Episode: "-The Good Samaritan"
1959	The Gale Storm Show	Parker	Episode: "Spanish Souvenir"
1959–1960	Peter Gunn	Various roles	3 episodes
1960	Richard Diamond, Private Detective	Dr. Braun	Episode: "The Fine Art of Murder"
1960	Man with a Camera	George	Episode: "Hot Ice Cream"
1960	Goodyear Theatre	Kramer	Episode: "Marked Down for Connie"
1960	Happy	Mr. Williams	Episode: "The Wedding Anniversary"
1960	Tom, Dick and Harry	Owner	Television movie
1960	Outlaws	Conductor	Episode: "Thirty a Month"
1960	The Tab Hunter Show	Plumber	Episode: "The Matchmaker"
1960	Angel	Mr. Hopkins	Episode: "The Maid"
1960	Maverick	Various roles	2 episodes
1960	Laramie	Waldo	Episode: "Duel at Parkison Town"
1960	Alfred Hitchcock Presents	Mr. Pickett	Season 5 Episode 32: "One Grave Too Many"
1960–1962	The Flintstones	Doctor	Voice, 3 episodes
1961	Alfred Hitchcock Presents	Mr. Maxwell	Season 6 Episode 16: "A Crime for Mothers"
1961	Klondike	Augustus Brown	Episode: "The Golden Burro"
1961	Michael Shayne	Ralph Beale	Episode: "Murder at the Convention"
1961	Mister Ed	Harry Sweetzer	Episode: "Pine Lake Lodge"
1961	The Joey Bishop Show		Episode: "Charity Begins at Home"
1961	The Tall Man	Cyrus Skinner	Episode: "A Tombstone for Billy"
1961–1967	The Andy Griffith Show	Floyd Lawson	80 episodes, (incl. final appearance)
1962	Room for One More	Mr. Sommers	Episode: "The Anniversary"
1962	Pete and Gladys	Professor Sheboyan	Episode: "Follow That Skeleton"
1962	Thriller	Jack Passasstroy	Episode: "Cousin Tundifer"
1962	Frontier Circus	Judge Stuart	Episode: "Calamity Circus"
1962	Calvin and the Colonel	Ernie	Voice, 2 episodes
1962	Margie	Selkirk	Episode: "Margie, the Gossip Columnist"
1962	Alcoa Premiere	Charles Bennett	Episode: "The Time of the Tonsils"
1962	The Wide Country	Agent Carmody	Episode: "Straitjacket for an Indian"
1962	The Many Loves of Dobie Gillis	Various roles	2 episodes
1962	The Twilight Zone	Mitchell	Episode: "Hocus-Pocus and Frisby"
1963	The Twilight Zone	Bramhoff	Episode: "The Bard"
1964	Gunsmoke	Howard Rudd	Episode: "Aunt Thede"
1965	Harris Against the World	Clark	Episode: "Harris Against Anniversary Gifts"
1965	Honey West	Mr. Tweedy	Episode: "A Nice Little Till to Tap"
1965	Please Don't Eat the Daisies	Mr. Arnold	Episode: "The Leaning Tower of Ridgemont"
