= Floyd Lawson =

Fictional Character on the Andy Griffith Show

- The Andy Griffith Show character
- Howard McNear as Floyd Lawson
- First appearance: "Stranger in Town"; The Andy Griffith Show; December 26, 1960
- Last appearance: "Goober's Contest"; The Andy Griffith Show; April 10, 1967
- Portrayed by: Walter Baldwin; Howard McNear

In-universe information
- Occupation: Barber
- Affiliation: Mayberry Town Band (trumpet); Downtown Businessman's Club; The Regal Order of the Golden Door to Good Fellowship; Volunteer deputy
- Spouse: Melba
- Children: Norman; Randall
- Relatives: Virginia Lee (niece); Warren Ferguson (nephew); Lamar Tuttle (cousin); Daniel Lawson (ancestor)
- Religion: Christian

Floyd Lawson (Floyd the Barber) is a fictional character on the American sitcom The Andy Griffith Show. Floyd was primarily portrayed by actor Howard McNear.

== Character overview ==
Floyd the Barber was the slow-paced, somewhat absent-minded barber in the series' fictional town of Mayberry. He was born and raised in Mayberry, having descended from one of the town's original settlers, Daniel Lawson. He was a founding member of the town band, served as secretary of the Downtown Businessman's Club, and is a member of The Regal Order of the Golden Door to Good Fellowship.

Floyd has one son, Norman, with his wife, Melba. Other family members mentioned throughout the run of the show include niece Virginia Lee. Floyd's nephew, Warren Ferguson, served as town deputy for a time. Lamar Tuttle is also mentioned as Floyd's cousin.

Floyd is first introduced in the first-season episode "Stranger in Town" and is played by actor Walter Baldwin. Baldwin established the running gag of Floyd's inability to trim sideburns evenly, which continued throughout the run of the series. Baldwin portrayed Floyd for just one episode, and the character otherwise differed from the later version, with most of the jokes stemming from the bespectacled Floyd's barely being able to see. From January, 1961 on, the role was played by Howard McNear, the actor most commonly associated with the role.

Over the first few seasons, the importance of Floyd the Barber to the series increased. Slowly, McNear changed his delivery of dialogue for Floyd from fast-paced to slower and slower as time went on. Floyd also became involved more in the plots of the various episodes as the show progressed.

In early 1963, midway through the third season, Howard McNear suffered a serious stroke. He was left with limited use of his arms and legs, especially his left arm, which rarely moved. The producers of the series and Andy Griffith wanted McNear to return as Floyd when his health permitted it, and after about a year, McNear was talked into coming back, despite his initial reluctance. The series had a special chair constructed that McNear was able to sit in most of the time while on the set, as the stroke had left him only able to stand for short periods of time. Accordingly, the Floyd character then began to appear regularly again on the series towards the end of season four.

The last appearance of Floyd the Barber on The Andy Griffith Show was in the final episode of the seventh season. Howard McNear's health worsened and he was not able to return to the series for season eight, and he died less than a year later. To try to fill in his loss on the series, a new character named Emmett Clark (a fix-it man) was brought in. As announced on the series, Floyd had retired because he had earned enough money. Emmett (played by veteran character actor Paul Hartman) moved his fix-it shop from his home into Floyd's old barber shop location.

== Inconsistencies ==
In Howard McNear's first appearance as Floyd, "Mayberry Goes Hollywood," the character is referred to as Floyd Colby and the barbershop was called "Colby's Tonsorial Parlor". Later Floyd's surname was established to be "Lawson."

Early in the series, Floyd has a son and a wife, although in at least one episode ("Floyd the Gay Deceiver"), he says he is a widower.

== In popular culture ==
=== In television ===
Over the years, "Floyd the barber" has been used in a variety of television programming. Some examples include the following:

- In an episode of St. Elsewhere guest-starring Griffith cast member Jack Dodson, the characters make reference to the hospital's barber also named Floyd.
- On NBC's sitcom 30 Rock, Liz Lemon's recurring boyfriend, a recovering alcoholic, is named Floyd de Barber and played by Saturday Night Live cast member Jason Sudeikis.
- The FX series Sons of Anarchy featured a barber by the name of Floyd, first showing up in season one.
- In the Animaniacs episode "Dough Dough Boys/Boot Camping/General Boo-Regard", Wakko gets his hair cut by Floyd during boot camp.
- He appears in the intro of Freakazoid!, where he is seen cutting Freakazoid's hair with a tiny lawnmower.
- In the English dub of Digimon: The Movie, Matt and T.K. go to a barber shop, where the barber is addressed as "Floyd". In the closing credits, other characters in the barber shop are credited as "Andy," "Barney", and "Aunt Bea".
- In the fourth-season episode of Arrested Development entitled "Smashed", during the "haircut meeting", Ron Howard refers to his barber as Floyd, remarking that he calls all of his barbers "Floyd". Howard was a fellow castmate in The Andy Griffith Show.

=== In music ===
- The Nirvana song, "Floyd the Barber", from their debut studio album Bleach, turns the innocent TV program into a grotesque nightmare. It imagines Kurt Cobain visiting the character's barber shop and getting sexual assaulted, tortured and murdered by characters from the show.

=== The "real life" Floyd ===
With the popularity of The Andy Griffith Show, interest in the influence of Mount Airy, NC as the inspiration for Mayberry grew. Russell Hiatt, a barber at Mount Airy's City Barber Shop claimed to have cut Andy Griffith's hair, although this is disputed by Griffith. City Barber Shop was established in 1929, and Hiatt began working there in 1946. In 1989, the name was changed to "Floyd's City Barber Shop". Whether Hiatt actually cut Griffith's hair when the actor had yet to become famous is uncertain. Hiatt was only two years older than Griffith, so he would have had to have cut his hair before Griffith moved away from Mount Airy to attend college in the late 1940s. Griffith and Hiatt would both have been teenagers at that time.
