= Jean Carson =

American actress (1923–2005)

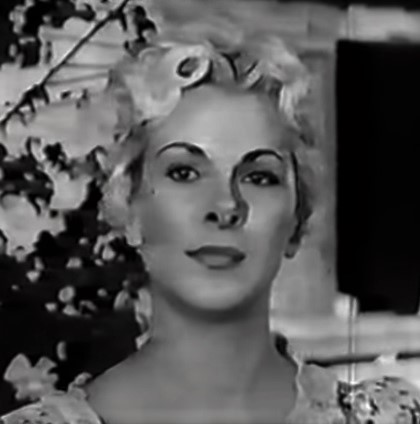
- Carson in the TV series Frontier Doctor (1959)
- Born: Jean Leete Carson; February 28, 1923; Charleston, West Virginia, U.S.
- Died: November 2, 2005 (aged 82); Palm Springs, California, U.S.
- Occupation: Actress
- Years active: 1949–1977
- Spouse(s): Leonard S. Smith, Jr.
- Children: 2
- Website: hellodoll.com

Jean Leete Carson (February 28, 1923 – November 2, 2005) was an American stage, film and television actress best known for her work on the classic 1960s sitcom The Andy Griffith Show as one of the "fun girls".

== Early life ==
Carson was born in Charleston, West Virginia.

== Stage ==
Carson's early theatrical work included acting in productions of the Kanawha Players. She made her Broadway debut in George S. Kaufman's Bravo (1948), which garnered her a Theater World Award. Her other Broadway work included The Bird Cage (1950) and Anniversary Waltz (1954).

== Television ==
Carson went on to appear in many pioneering television series, including Studio One, NBC Presents, The Twilight Zone (as Paula in "A Most Unusual Camera", a part written especially for her by Rod Serling) and The Ford Theatre Hour. She continued to make guest starring appearances throughout the 1950s, including as Annie, a. saloon moll in "Wagon Train" S1 E12 "The Riley Gratton Story" in 1957. She played Paula in Peter Gunn in 1958 and had a regular role on 1959's The Betty Hutton Show.

She played the part of a saloon owner (Maggie) who takes in an orphan in season 1 episode 9 of the series Sugarfoot in 1958.

On The Andy Griffith Show, Carson had a brief role as Naomi in a 1962 episode ("Convicts at Large" with Jane Dulo and Reta Shaw), but her most popular role was Daphne, one of the "fun girls", who appeared with Joyce Jameson on a recurring basis from 1962 to 1965. Daphne was a notorious flirt who greeted her objects of affection with a throaty "Hello, doll".

In February 1964, she had a featured role as a nosy neighbor in "The Case of the Bountiful Beauty", season 7, episode 17 of Perry Mason.

== Film ==
Carson had roles in films such as 1955's The Phenix City Story and 1958's I Married a Monster from Outer Space.

She earned fourth billing in the 1968 Peter Sellers comedy The Party, perhaps her best-known film. Her last film role was 1977's Fun with Dick and Jane.

== Personal life ==
Carson was married to Leonard Smith Jr., who was the assistant manager of the Roxy Theater.

== Death ==
On November 2, 2005, Carson died in Palm Springs, California, from complications of a stroke; she was 82 years old. She was survived by two sons.

== Filmography ==
Year	Title	Role	Other notes
1949	NBC Presents		TV, 1 episode
1949	The Philco Television Playhouse		TV, 1 episode
1949–1952	Studio One	Mary Warren	TV, 3 episodes
1950	The Ford Theatre Hour		TV, 1 episode
1950	The Trap		TV, 1 episode
1950	Robert Montgomery Presents		TV, 1 episode
1951	The Adventures of Ellery Queen		TV, 2 episodes
1952	Schlitz Playhouse of Stars	Model	TV, 1 episode
1953	Eye Witness		TV, 1 episode
1954	Inner Sanctum	Vera Craig	TV, 1 episode
1954	The Mask		TV, 1 episode
1954	The Man Behind the Badge		TV, 1 episode
1955	The Phenix City Story	Cassie	
1957	The 20th Century Fox Hour	Ethel Marzack	TV, 1 episode
1957	The Gale Storm Show	Josephine	TV, 1 episode
1957	The Court of Last Resort	Myra North	TV, 1 episode
1957	M Squad	Doris Colby	TV, 1 episode
1958	Sugarfoot	Lilly	TV, 1 episode
1958	Bachelor Father		TV, 1 episode
1958	The Phil Silvers Show	Bidgett Hepperwhite	TV, 1 episode
1958	I Married a Monster from Outer Space	Helen Rhodes	
1958	Death Valley Days	Della Allison	TV, 1 episode
1958	Peter Gunn	Pearl	TV, 1 episode
1959	Frontier Doctor	Flo Warren	TV, 1 episode
1959	The Sound and the Fury	Mary Ellen	Uncredited
1959	General Electric Theater	Dorris Krosky	TV, 1 episode
1959	Here Come the Jets	Jean	
1959	The Walter Winchell File	Florrie	TV, 1 episode
1959	The Millionaire	Marie	TV, 1 episode
1959–1960	The Betty Hutton Show	Rosemary	TV, unknown episodes
1960	The Chevy Mystery Show	Donna	TV, 1 episode
1960	Lock-Up		TV, 1 episode
1960	The Twilight Zone	Paula Diedrich	TV, 1 episode
1961	Ripcord	Blanche Telford	TV, 1 episode
1961	Dante	Ginny Kane	TV, 1 episodes
1961	Sanctuary	Norma	
1961	The Tom Ewell Show	Diane	TV, 1 episodes
1961	Coronado 9	Lois Dixon	TV, 1 episode
1961	The Untouchables	Sylvia Orkins	TV, 1 episode
1962	The Joey Bishop Show	Marge	TV, 3 episodes
1962	Stoney Burke	Merle	TV, 1 episode
1963	77 Sunset Strip	Viola Dorn	TV, 1 episode
1962–1965	The Andy Griffith Show	"fun girl" Daphne (3x) escaped convict Naomi (1x)	TV, 4 episodes
1964	Perry Mason	Mrs. Mitchell	TV, 1 episode
1964	One Man's Way	Woman Who Shoots Husband	
1964	Burke's Law	Eagle Eye	TV, 1 episode
1964	Wendy and Me	Mrs. Talbot	TV, 1 episode
1966	Chamber of Horrors		Uncredited
1967	Warning Shot	Cocktail Waitress	Uncredited
1967	Gunn	Waitress	Uncredited
1968	The Party	Nanny	
1968	The Outsider	Mary Potter	TV, 1 episode
1969	Anatomy of a Crime	Mary Potter	Television movie
1977	Fun with Dick and Jane	Paula	(final film role)
