= Joyce Jameson =

American actress (1927–1987)

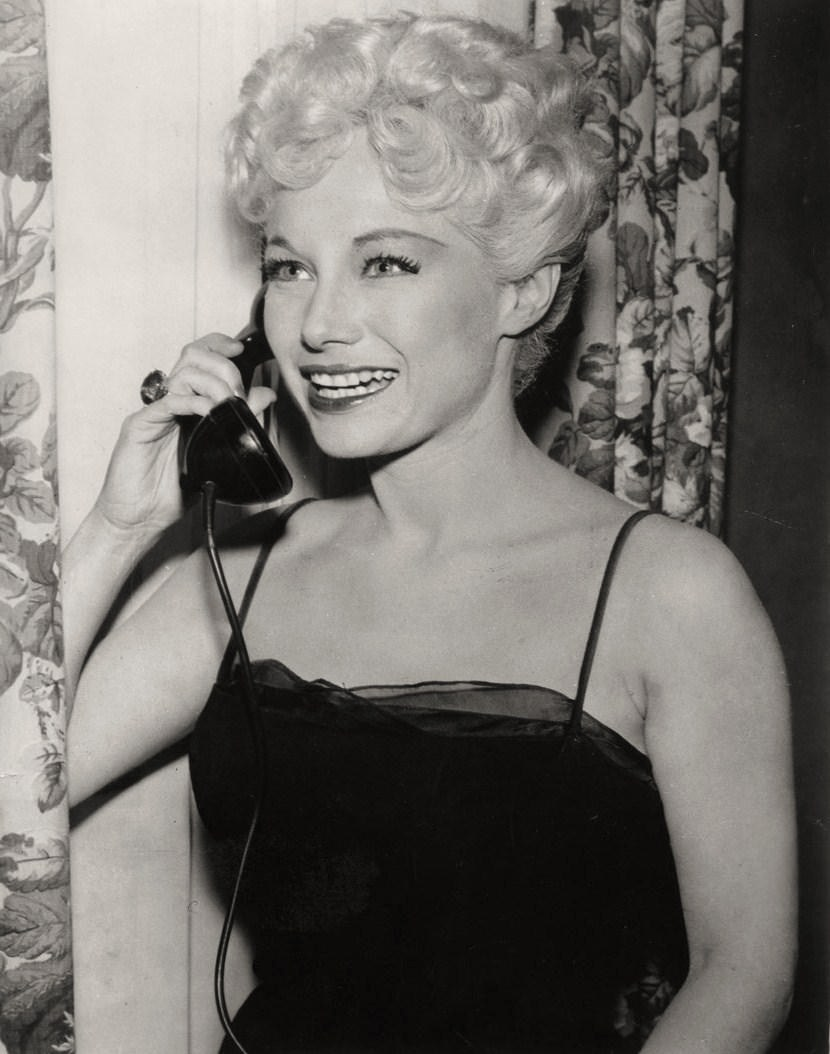
- Jameson in "Blaze of Glory" (1958), an episode of G.E. Theater
- Born: Joyce Beverly Kingsley; September 26, 1927; Chicago, Illinois, U.S.
- Died: January 16, 1987 (aged 59); Burbank, California, U.S.
- Education: University of California, Los Angeles
- Occupation: Actress
- Years active: 1951–1984
- Spouse: Billy Barnes (m. 1952; div. 1957)
- Children: 1

Joyce Jameson (born Joyce Beverly Kingsley; September 26, 1927 – January 16, 1987) was an American actress, known for many television roles, including recurring guest appearances as Skippy, one of the "fun girls" in the 1960s television series The Andy Griffith Show as well as "the Blonde" in the Academy Award-winning The Apartment (1960).

== Early life ==
Jameson was born in Chicago. She graduated from UCLA with a Bachelor of Arts degree.

== Career ==
=== Films ===
Joyce Jameson

Jameson began work in the early 1950s with numerous uncredited roles in films and television. She made her film debut in 1951 playing a chorus girl dancer in the motion picture Show Boat. Other notable film credits of that early period included Problem Girls (1953), Tip on a Dead Jockey (1957) and The Apartment (1960).

In 1962, she starred with Vincent Price and Peter Lorre in the Roger Corman horror film Tales of Terror as Annabel Herringbone. She played Lorre's vulgar, unfaithful wife, and during the course of the film, she and her paramour (Price) were locked up in Lorre's wine cellar. One year later, she again starred with Lorre and Price in the raucous comedy The Comedy of Terrors (released in 1964). In 1964, she appeared as a hotel hooker in the comedy Good Neighbor Sam, starring Jack Lemmon and Romy Schneider.

In 1966, she starred as Abigail in the Elvis Presley film Frankie and Johnny and in Boy, Did I Get a Wrong Number! with Bob Hope and Elke Sommer. She also appeared in 1968's The Split, a crime film with Jim Brown and Warren Oates, and in an unsold comedy pilot for CBS titled The Mouse That Roared.

Jameson had roles in Death Race 2000 (1975) playing Grace Pander, The Outlaw Josey Wales (1976) as Rose, Every Which Way but Loose (1978), and Hardbodies (1984).

=== Television ===
Jameson was also a television actress. She was a regular member of the cast on Club Oasis. She made two appearances on Perry Mason: first as Lorraine Iverson in the 1963 episode "The Case of the Floating Stones", then as Dolly Jameson in the 1965 episode, "The Case of the Feather Cloak". She also had roles on The Dick Van Dyke Show (in the episode "A Day in the Life of Alan Brady"), Gunsmoke, Stagecoach West, The Twilight Zone, The Man from U.N.C.L.E. (The Dippy Blonde Affair), McHale's Navy, My Favorite Martian, The New Phil Silvers Show, The Munsters, Hogan's Heroes and F Troop. Also, in 1966, she was Irene in the Gomer Pyle, U.S.M.C. episode, "Vacation in Las Vegas". And not long after, she had a couple of roles in Hogan's Heroes (in the January 1967 episode "The Great Brinksmeyer Robbery" as Mady Pleiffer, and again later that same year in "Sgt. Schultz Meets Mata Hari" as Gestapo agent Eva Mueller), Alias Smith and Jones, Emergency! and Barney Miller. She appeared in The Rockford Files (in the 1974 episode "The Dexter Crisis" as Marge White). Later, she appeared in Charlie's Angels, The Feather and Father Gang, and The Love Boat.

Her ongoing role as Skippy paired with Daphne (played by Jean Carson) in The Andy Griffith Show established The Fun Girls. She provided one of the voices for the cartoon series Jokebook. She was a co-host of Tempo III, a program on KHJ-TV in Los Angeles. From 1959 through 1963 she played Lola Laverne on the Many Loves of Dobie Gillis with Duane Hickman starring and Bob Denver (Gilligan)

=== Stage ===
Jameson's Broadway credits include The Billy Barnes Revue (1959), Venus at Large (1961) and The Billy Barnes People (1961).

== Personal life ==
She married actor/songwriter Billy Barnes in the 1950s, and they had one child together, son Tyler, before their divorce. Subsequently, Jameson was a longtime girlfriend of The Man from U.N.C.L.E. star Robert Vaughn. She acted opposite Vaughn as the guest star on a 1966 U.N.C.L.E. episode "The Dippy Blond Affair". According to Vaughn's autobiography, A Fortunate Life, Jameson suffered from depression. She was also an insomniac and regularly took Miltown to help her sleep.

== Death ==
On January 16, 1987, Jameson died by suicide at her Burbank, California home by overdosing on pills.

== Filmography ==
Film
Year	Title	Role	Notes
1951	Show Boat	Chorus Girl	Uncredited
1951	The Strip	Show Girl	Uncredited
1951	The Son of Dr. Jekyll	Barmaid	Uncredited
1953	Problem Girls	Peggy Carstairs	
1954	Phffft!	Secretary	Uncredited
1956	Crime Against Joe	Gloria Wayne	
1956	Tension at Table Rock	Singer	Uncredited
1957	Tip on a Dead Jockey	Sue Fan Finley	
1960	The Apartment	The Blonde	
1962	Tales of Terror	Annabel Herringbone	(segment "The Black Cat")
1963	The Balcony	Penitent	
1963	The Comedy of Terrors	Amaryllis Trumbull	
1964	Good Neighbor Sam	Elsie Hooker	
1966	Frankie and Johnny	Abigail	
1966	Boy, Did I Get a Wrong Number!	Telephone operator	
1968	The Split	Jennifer	
1975	Death Race 2000	Grace Pander	
1976	The Outlaw Josey Wales	Rose	
1976	Scorchy	Mary Davis	Alternative title: Race with Death
1979	Every Which Way but Loose	Sybil	
1980	Pray TV	Millie Peebles	Alternative title: K-GOD
1983	Ladies Night	Emcee	
1983	The Man Who Loved Women		Uncredited
1984	Hardbodies	Rounder's Mom	
1984	Lovelines	Mary Assquith	(final film role)
Television
Year	Title	Role	Notes
1956	Science Fiction Theatre	Nina Lasalle	Season 2 Episode 31: "The Human Circuit"
1958	Playhouse 90	Miss Cooper	Season 2 Episode 21: "The Gentleman from Seventh Avenue"
1958	The Danny Thomas Show	Gloria Duncan	Season 6 Episode 8: "Uncle Tonoose's Fling"
1959	Playhouse 90	Elsie	Season 3 Episode 32: "A Marriage of Strangers"
1959	Yancy Derringer	Bonnie Mason	Season 1 Episode 33: "Gone But Not Forgotten"
1960	The Betty Hutton Show	Beverly Bell	Season 1 Episode 23: "The Seaton Story"
1961	Lock-Up	Coralee	Season 2 Episode 30: "The Case of Willie Betterley"
1961	The Many Loves of Dobie Gillis	Merilee Maribou	Season 2 Episode 19: "Will Success Spoil Dobie's Mother?"
1962	Outlaws	Lotus Cassidy	Season 2 Episode 13: "The Dark Sunrise of Griff Kincaid"
1962	Andy Griffith Show	Skippy	Season 3 Episode 6: "Barney Mends a Broken Heart"
1963	The Many Loves of Dobie Gillis	Patsy	Season 4 Episode 17: "All Right, Dobie, Drop the Gun"
1963	The Many Loves of Dobie Gillis	Lola LaVerne	Season 4 Episode 31: "Requiem for an Underweight Heavyweight"
1963	The Danny Thomas Show	Nikki Stewart	Season 10 Episode 26: "Louise to the Rescue"
1963	The Alfred Hitchcock Hour	Rosie Feather	Season 2 Episode 11: "How to Get Rid of Your Wife"
1963	McHale's Navy	Kate O'Hara	Season 2 Episode 15: "Orange Blossoms for McHale"
1963	Perry Mason	Lorraine	Season 7 Episode 8: "The Case of the Floating Stones"
1963	The Twilight Zone	Starlet	Season 4 Episode 12: "I Dream of Genie"
1964	Andy Griffith Show	Skippy	Season 4 Episode 27: "Fun Girls"
1964	Grindl	Laverne	Season 1 Episode 15: "The Lucky Piece"
1964	My Favorite Martian	Flossie	Season 2 Episode 12: "The Night Life of Uncle Martin"
1965	Andy Griffith Show	Skippy	Season 5 Episode 28: "The Arrest of the Fun Girls"
1965	Perry Mason	Dolly Jameson	Season 8 Episode 19: "The Case of the Feather Cloak"
1965	The Baileys of Balboa	Mary Brown	Season 1 Episode 15: "Sam's Dream"
1965	The Munsters	Miss Valentine	Season 1 Episode 23: "Dance with Me, Herman"
1966	The Munsters	Lou	Season 2 Episode 16: "Herman Picks a Winner"
1966	The Man from U.N.C.L.E.	Jojo Tyler	Season 2 Episode 16: "The Dippy Blonde Affair"
1966	The Dick Van Dyke Show	Blanche	Season 5 Episode 25: "A Day in the Life of Alan Brady"
1966	Gomer Pyle U.S.M.C.	Irene	Season 2 Episode 25: "Vacation in Las Vegas"
1967	Hogan's Heroes	Mady Pfeiffer	Season 2 Episode 18: "The Great Brinksmeyer Robbery"
1967	Hogan's Heroes	Eva Mueller	Season 3 Episode 4: "Sergeant Shultz Meets Mata Hari"
1967	The Big Valley	The Blonde	Season 2 Episode 21: "The Haunted Gun"
1967	The Girl from U.N.C.L.E.	Shirley Fummer	Season 1 Episode 21: "The Carpathian Caper Affair"
1968	Gomer Pyle U.S.M.C.	Natalie	Season 5 Episode 4: "The Return of Monroe"
1969	The Virginian	Millie	Season 8 Episode 1: "Long Ride Home"
1970	Run, Simon, Run	Esther	Television movie Alternative titles: Savage Run; The Tradition of Simon Zuniga
1971	Ironside	Mrs. Akerman	Season 5 Episode 2: "Contract: "Kill Ironside"
1972	Women in Chains	Simpson	Television movie
1973	Here's Lucy	Prisoner	Season 5 Episode 18: "Lucy Goes to Prison"
1973	Emergency	Harriet	Season 3 Episode 14: "Computer Error"
1974	Movin' On	Angela Wentworth	Season 1 Episode 13: "Goin' Home: Part 2"
1974	The Rockford Files	Marge White	Season 1 Episode 10: "The Dexter Crisis"
1974	The Waltons	Helen Faye	Season 3 Episode 9: "The Marathon"
1975	Emergency	Woman Stuck in Door	Season 4 Episode 17: "Kidding"
1975	The First 36 Hours of Dr. Durant	Mrs. Graham	ABC Movie of the Week
1975	Promise Him Anything	Lucille	ABC Movie of the Week
1976	Baretta	Lucille	Season 3 Episode 5: "They Don't Make 'Em Like They Used To"
1977	The Feather and Father Gang	Norma	Season 1 Episode 4: "The People's Choice"
1978	Barney Miller	Catherine Lindsay	Season 4 Episode 15: "Rape"
1978	Crash	Sophie Cross	Television movie Alternative title: Crash of Flight 401
1979	The Wild Wild West Revisited	Lola (Showgirl)	Television movie
1982	The Fall Guy	Lucille	Season 1 Episode 12: "The Adventures of Ozzie and Harold"
