= Beanie (seamed cap) =

Small round skullcaps, often colorful

In the United States, a beanie is a head-hugging brimless cap, sometimes made from triangular panels of material joined by a button at the crown and seamed together around the sides. Beanies may be made of cloth, felt, wool, leather, or silk. In many US regions, the term "beanie" refers to a knitted cap (often woolen), alternately called a "stocking cap" or (especially in Canada) a "toque".

== Styles ==
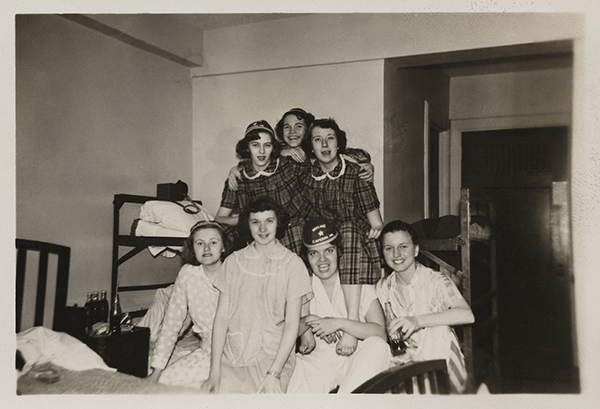
Jefferson Medical College Hospital School of Nursing students wearing Skyline Caverns beanies c.1951

One popular style of the beanie during the early half of the twentieth century was a kind of skullcap made of four or six felt panels sewn together to form the cap. The panels were often composed of two or more different contrasting colors to give them a novel and distinctive look. This type of beanie was also very popular with some colleges and fraternities, as they would often use school colors in the different panels making up the headgear.

Another style of beanie was the whoopee cap, a formed and pressed wool felted hat, with a flipped-up brim that formed a band around the bottom of the cap. The band would often have a decorative repeating zig-zag or scalloped pattern cut around the edge. This gives the whoopee cap the appearance of a silly-looking crown made of fabric, or yarn that has been knit or crocheted instead of precious metals like gold, silver, platinum, and so on. It was also quite common for schoolboys to adorn these styles of beanies with buttons and pins.

== Etymology ==
According to the Oxford English Dictionary, the etymology is uncertain, but probably derives from the slang term "bean", meaning "head". In New Zealand and Australia, the term "beanie" is normally applied to a knit cap known as a toque in Canada and parts of the US, but also may apply to the kind of skull cap historically worn by surf lifesavers and still worn during surf sports. The non-knitted variety is normally called a "cap" in other countries.

Other explanations have referred to the cloth-covered button on the crown, which is about the size of a bean. Some academics believe that the term is instead derived from a type of headgear worn in some medieval universities. The yellow hats (bejaunus, meaning "yellowbill", later beanus, a term used for both the hats and the new students) evolved into the college beanies of later years.

In the United Kingdom, the term "Benny hat" may also refer to a knitted style of head-covering. This name originally comes from the character "Benny" from the British soap opera Crossroads, played by actor Paul Henry. The character appeared from the mid-1970s to the late 1980s and usually wore a knitted version of the hat.

== History ==
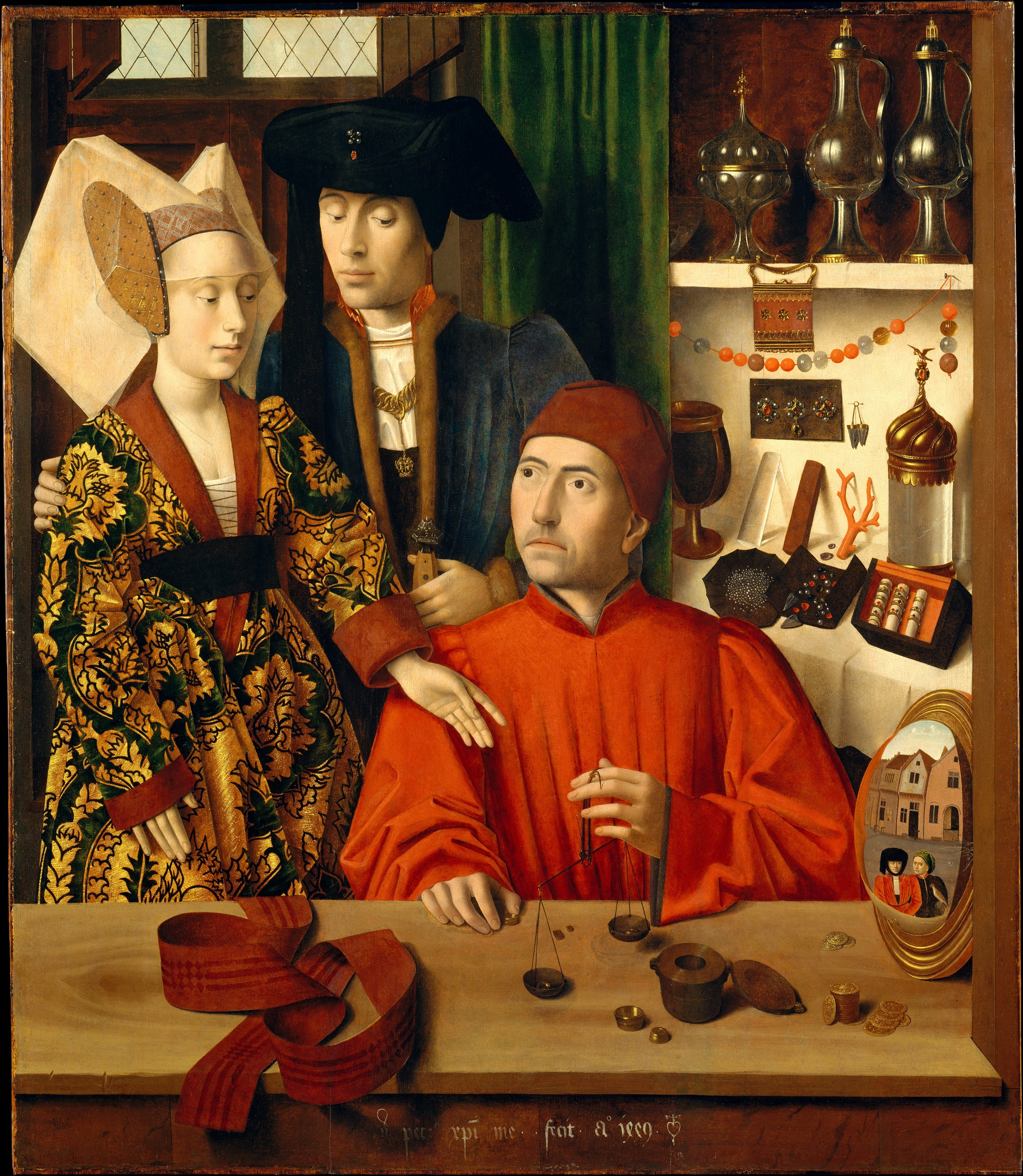
Petrus Christus, A Goldsmith in his Shop, 15th century. Evidence of a beanie like cap.

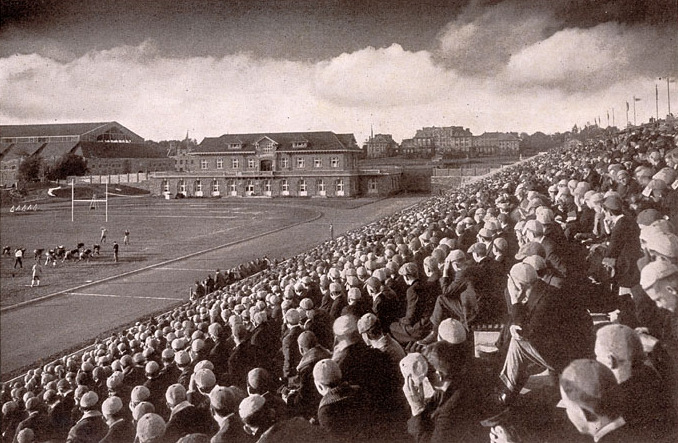
Cornell University freshmen wearing beanies in 1919

Beanie-style hats have been traced back to 15th-century Britain and may have coincided with the introduction of knitting in the 15th century. However, early beanies more likely would have been woven using a loom, as this was a more common method.

A larger variant of the skullcap, the beanie was working apparel associated with blue-collar laborers, including welders, mechanics, and other tradesmen who needed to keep their hair back, but for whom a brim would be an unnecessary obstruction. Beanies do sometimes have a very small brim, less than an inch deep, around the brow front. The baseball cap evolved from this kind of beanie, with the addition of a visor to block the sun.

By the mid-1940s, beanies fell out of general popularity as a hat, in favor of cotton visored caps like the baseball cap. However, in the 1950s and possibly beyond, they were worn by college freshmen and various fraternity initiates as a form of mild hazing. For example, Lehigh University required freshmen to wear beanies, or "dinks", and other colleges including Franklin & Marshall, Gettysburg, Rutgers, Westminster College, and others may have had similar practices. Benedictine College, in Atchison, Kansas, still carries this tradition for the first week of a freshman's classes, and is said to be the only college in the US to maintain this tradition. Georgia Tech continues to provide freshmen with RAT caps, though their mandatory wear ceased in the 1960s. Wilson College continues this tradition today as a part of its Odd/Even class year "rivalry".

At Cornell University, freshman beanies (known as "dinks") were worn into the early 1960s. Dinks were not officially required, but their wearing was enforced by student peer pressure. An annual ritual was the burning of the caps in a boisterous bonfire.

== Propeller cap ==
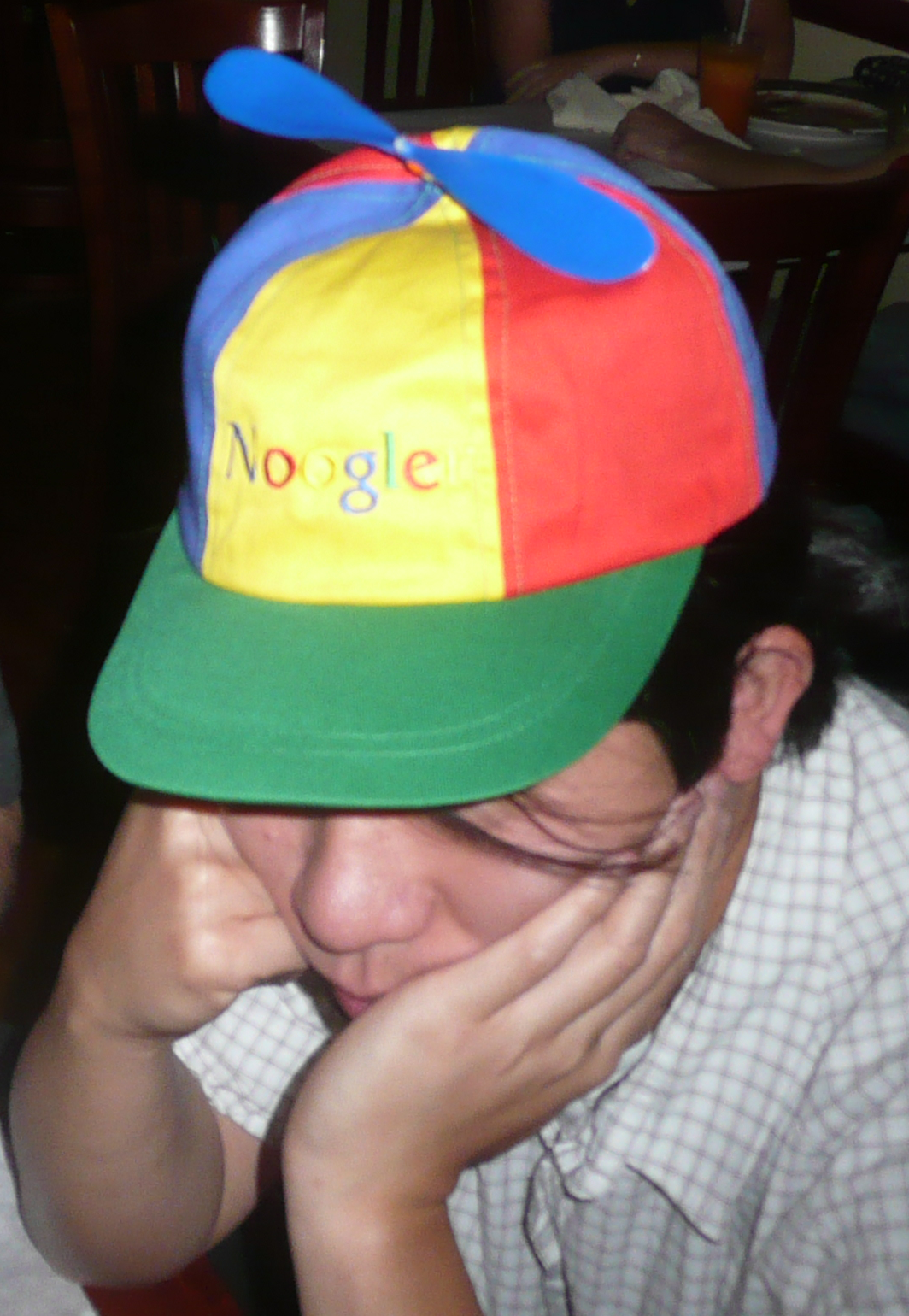
Propeller baseball cap

In the summer of 1947, while still in high school, science fiction fanzine artist Ray Nelson, per his claim, invented the propeller beanie as part of a "spaceman" costume on a lark with some friends. He later drew it in his cartoons as emblematic shorthand for science fiction fandom. The hat became a fad, seen in media such as "Time for Beanie", and was sold widely by many manufacturers over the next decade.

The propeller beanie increased in popular use through comics and eventually made its way onto the character of Beany Boy of Beany and Cecil. Today, computer-savvy and other technically proficient people are sometimes pejoratively called propellerheads because of the one-time popularity of the propeller beanie.

In the 21st century, propeller beanies are rarely seen on the street and are primarily worn for satirical or comedic purposes. As part of their onboarding, Google traditionally offered these to their newly hired employees, "Nooglers".

In 1996, student hackers placed a giant propeller beanie on the Great Dome at the Massachusetts Institute of Technology. The scaled-up propeller rotated as the wind drove it like a windmill.

In modern times in Western culture, it is mostly associated with stereotypical, cartoon depictions of pre-adolescent children, alongside a prototypical set of other accessories, such as big circular lollipops, overalls and striped t-shirts. The website TV Tropes has a page discussing the use of propeller hats in media as shorthand for youthfulness titled Propeller Hat of Whimsy.

== See also ==
- List of hat styles
- Baseball cap
- Blue Beanie Day
- Cap
- Kippah
- Knit cap
- Peaked cap
- Zucchetto
