= Goober Pyle =

- The Andy Griffith Show character
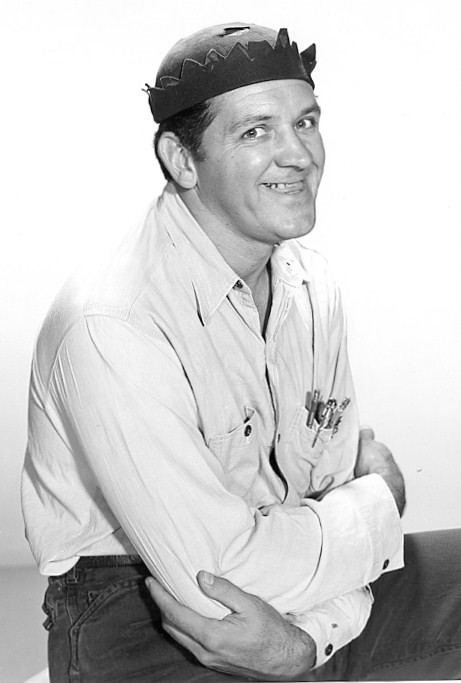
- George Lindsey as Goober Pyle in his signature whoopee cap
- First appearance: "Fun Girls"; The Andy Griffith Show; April 13, 1964
- Last appearance: Return to Mayberry; April 13, 1986
- Portrayed by: George Lindsey

In-universe information
- Nickname: Goob
- Occupation: Auto mechanic
- Relatives: Braden Pyle (brother); Gomer Pyle (cousin)

Goober Pyle is a fictional character in the American TV sitcom The Andy Griffith Show and its sequel series Mayberry RFD. He was played by George Lindsey. Lindsey first read for the part of Gomer Pyle, Goober's cousin, which went to actor-singer Jim Nabors. The two actors had similar backgrounds; Lindsey was from Jasper, Alabama, while Nabors was from Sylacauga, Alabama. They were the show's comic relief. Lindsey was hired to fill the void when Gomer was spun off to his own TV series, Gomer Pyle, USMC. During season five, Goober was initially referred to as Goober Beasley. To solidify the connection to Gomer, Goober's surname was changed to "Pyle." Lindsey wrote a book, Goober in a Nutshell, about his experience playing Goober.

== Character ==
Goober is a cousin of Gomer Pyle, who often referred to Goober. Goober's first appearance is in the episode "Fun Girls" which is the only Andy Griffith Show episode in which Gomer and Goober appear together. Both Pyle cousins worked at Wally's Filling Station. Goober later appears in an episode of Gomer Pyle, U.S.M.C..

Goober Pyle visits Aunt Bee's Chinese restaurant in his formal attire

Goober was portrayed as backward and not very bright. A somewhat childlike and happy-go-lucky character, he had the ability to view life and people with a sense of wonder and goodness. His automotive mechanical skills were good, as evidenced by taking Gilly Walker's car apart and reassembling it inside the sheriff's office, and then taking it apart again and reassembling it again outside. Goober was similar to his cousin Gomer, though less animated. Both cousins shared a love for high-stepping swing dancing, even when the music was far less dynamic.

Goober's older brother Braden was a noted rocket-scientist for NASA. He visits in the Mayberry R.F.D. episode "Goober's Brother" (1970). Howard Sprague attributed the vast intellectual disparity between the brothers to Gregor Mendel's theory of recessive genes.

== Goober's attire ==
Goober was distinctively attired for the show. He was generally dressed in a work shirt, breast pocket filled with pencils, pens, and tire gauges. His dark blue Dickies work pants were hoisted high and cinched with a wide belt, giving him an Empire waistline. Work boots and a customized beanie hat or whoopee cap (similar to that of the comic character Jughead Jones) completed his episode-to-episode wardrobe.

Very occasionally, Goober would dress up for the rare formal occasion in a suit described as "an unsophisticated double-vested, brown pinstripe number with white socks" that was passed to him from his cousin Gomer. A garish tie completed the picture of the dressed-up Goober. Goober's suit was originally owned by Howard McNear (Floyd) who donated it for a friend's funeral. It was rejected and returned to the studio where it wound up in wardrobe.

On two occasions, Goober also wore one of Andy's suits, which was first loaned to him in Raleigh at the auto show when his suit ripped. He borrowed it again one other time. On August 27, 2010, the suit became part of the Andy Griffith Museum in Mount Airy, North Carolina. George Lindsey, who then was 81 and rarely traveled, asked Jim Clark to appear in his place, telling the crowd, "He told me to say 'Goober says hey!'" Clark said Lindsey wore the suit while playing Goober on many Andy Griffith Show/ "RFD" episodes as well as on Hee Haw.

== Character biography ==
Goober was born in either 1940 or 1941 (he says he was five years old when he was a witness to Floyd punching Charles Foley on August 9, 1946, in the episode entitled "The Case of the Punch in the Nose"). He was raised in Mayberry, was trained as a mechanic in Raleigh, North Carolina, and served a stint in the North Carolina National Guard where he picked up the phrase, "Yo." Goober worked at Wally's Filling Station, which he eventually purchased and became the proprietor of, later in the show's run. His girlfriend in two sixth season color episodes was Flora Malherbe, but his initial love interest was Lydia Crosswaith, who was originally from Greensboro, North Carolina.

Goober is known for his (bad) impressions of celebrities. He impersonates Cary Grant ("Judy, Judy, Judy, Judy, Judy!") and Edward G. Robinson ("OK, you guys. Come on, you guys. All right, you guys. Beat it, you guys."). He could also impersonate Chester Goode's walk from Gunsmoke and perform lame schtick such as simulating sewing up his fingers. The only people who were truly impressed by his talents were his cousin Gomer and the fun girls, Daphne and Skippy. He had a penchant for superhero and monster comic books and sci-fi movies. After the departure of Don Knotts's character Barney Fife, Goober replaced many of the shenanigans formerly attributed to Barney, such as divulging information across town that Andy preferred be kept private, or creating conflict from misunderstandings.

Goober is made an emergency deputy several times when minor crime waves erupted in Mayberry, mostly to Andy's chagrin due to Goober's incompetence or overzealousness.

Goober is an old friend of Andy Sawyer, a native of the much larger town of Greenwood who happens to look exactly like Sheriff Andy Taylor and behave similarly to him as well; Goober visits Sawyer in Greenwood during the premiere episode of The New Andy Griffith Show.

After the events of Mayberry R.F.D. and The New Andy Griffith Show, Goober relocates to Kornfield County and opens up a gas station of his own, where he spends the next twenty years as a cast member of the country variety revue Hee Haw. By this time, Goober had developed a substantial wit, and when a shyster (played by his brief Andy Griffith Show co-star Jack Burns) would attempt to con Goober out of money, Goober could always goad the shyster into a rematch and win his money back.

Goober appeared on 86 episodes of The Andy Griffith Show from 1964 through 1968, one episode each of Gomer Pyle U.S.M.C. and The New Andy Griffith Show and then on 54 episodes of Mayberry R.F.D. until its cancellation in 1971. Following that, Lindsey spent roughly 20 years playing the character on Hee Haw from 1972 through 1992. Goober also appeared in the 1978 television pilot Goober & the Truckers Paradise and the 1986 television reunion movie Return to Mayberry alongside Gomer, running the town's G 'n G gas station and auto repair shop.
