= George Lindsey =

American actor and stand-up comedian (1928–2012)

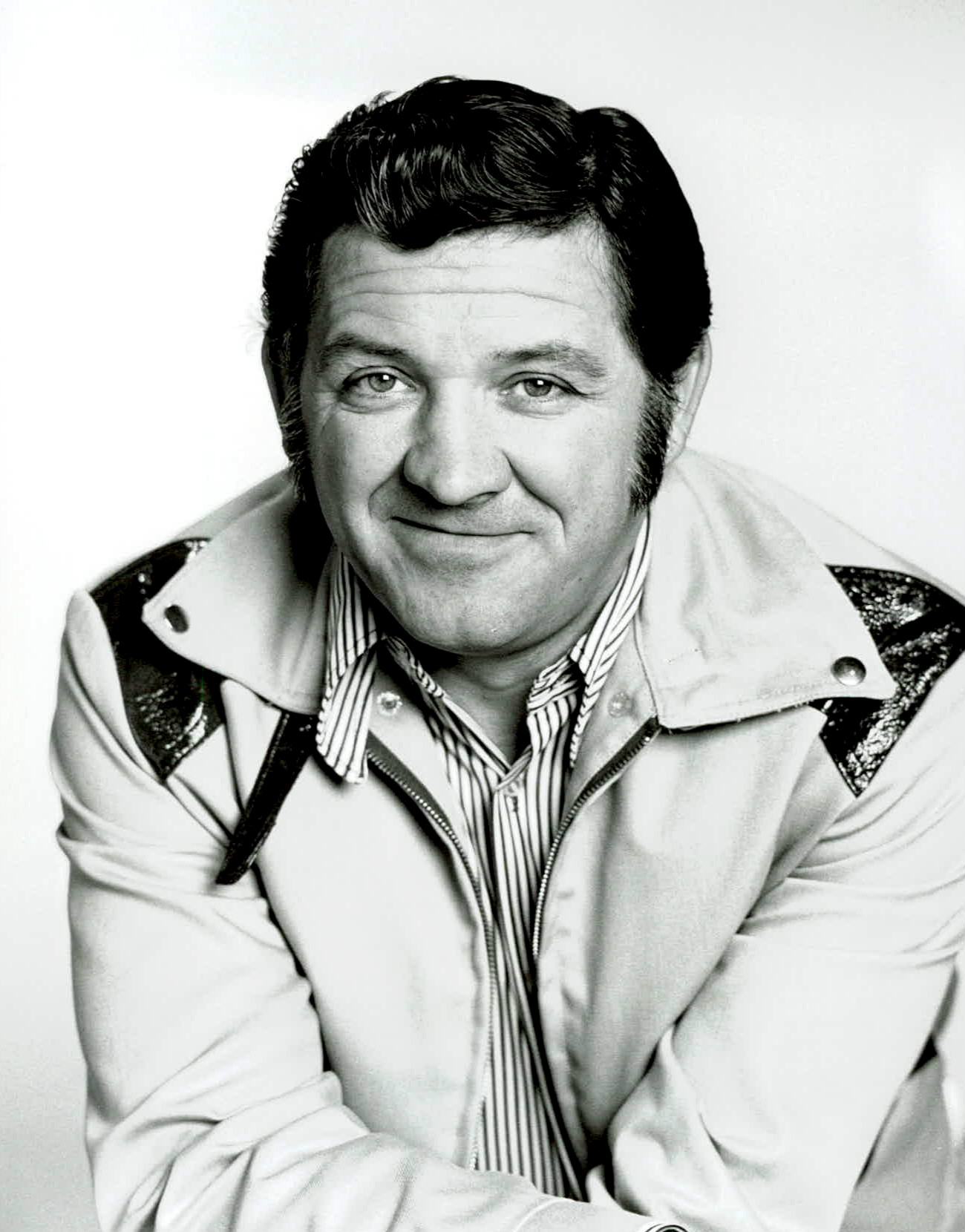
- Lindsey in 1973
- Born: December 17, 1928; Fairfield, Alabama, U.S.
- Died: May 6, 2012 (aged 83); Nashville, Tennessee, U.S.
- Resting place: Oak Hill Cemetery, Jasper, Alabama
- Education: Walker County High School (Jasper, Alabama)
- Alma mater: University of North Alabama; American Theatre Wing
- Occupations: Actor, stand-up comedian
- Years active: 1956–2006
- Spouse: Joy Herbert (m. 1955; div. 1991)
- Partner: Anne Wilson
- Children: 2

Comedy career
- Medium: Stand-up, film, television, books
- Genres: Insult comedy, observational comedy, musical comedy, improvisational comedy
- Subjects: American culture, self-deprecation, everyday life, religion, current events

George Smith Lindsey (December 17, 1928 – May 6, 2012) was an American actor and stand-up comedian, best known for his role as Goober Pyle on The Andy Griffith Show, Mayberry R.F.D. and his subsequent tenure on Hee-Haw.

== Life and career ==
George Lindsey was born in Fairfield, Alabama, to George Ross Lindsey, a butcher, and the former Alice Smith. He was raised by his grandparents in the small town of Jasper, where he graduated from Walker County High School in 1946. He attended Kemper Military School in Boonville, Missouri, and Florence State Teacher's College (Florence, Alabama) (now the University of North Alabama), where he majored in physical education and biology. He was a quarterback on the football team, and acted in college plays. He earned a Bachelor of Science in 1952.

After graduating from college, he enlisted in the United States Air Force and was stationed at Ramey Air Force Base in Puerto Rico. After his discharge, he taught for a year at Hazel Green High School in Hazel Green, Alabama, while waiting to be accepted by the American Theater Wing in New York City in 1956. On March 24, 1960, he appeared on the To Tell the Truth television quiz show, posing as a Florida spear fisherman and ultimately revealing himself as a "nightclub comic.”

After graduating from the Wing and performing in two Broadway plays, "Wonderful Town" and "All American", he moved to Los Angeles in 1962. He appeared in several TV series, including: Gunsmoke, The Rifleman, The Real McCoys, The Twilight Zone, Daniel Boone, Voyage to the Bottom of the Sea, and three episodes of The Alfred Hitchcock Hour before landing the role he would become famous for: "Goober" on The Andy Griffith Show.

=== The Andy Griffith Show, as Goober Pyle (1964) ===
In 1964, Lindsey joined The Andy Griffith Show as the slow-witted, but kindly Goober Beasley. His character was later renamed Goober Pyle to tie him to his cousin, Gomer Pyle, another slow-witted country boy, played by Jim Nabors, an actor who was also from Alabama. Goober's antics frequently included his exaggerated Goober Dance and his comically bad Cary Grant impression.

As Lindsey started his portrayal as Goober, he also had a minor role in the Walter Brennan series The Tycoon on ABC. Lindsey played: a sailor in the 1964 film Ensign Pulver, the sequel to Mister Roberts, a role in a Voyage to the Bottom of the Sea episode entitled "Submarine Sunk Here," in six episodes of the television series Gunsmoke, and a blackmailing taxicab driver in the "Bed of Roses" episode of The Alfred Hitchcock Hour.

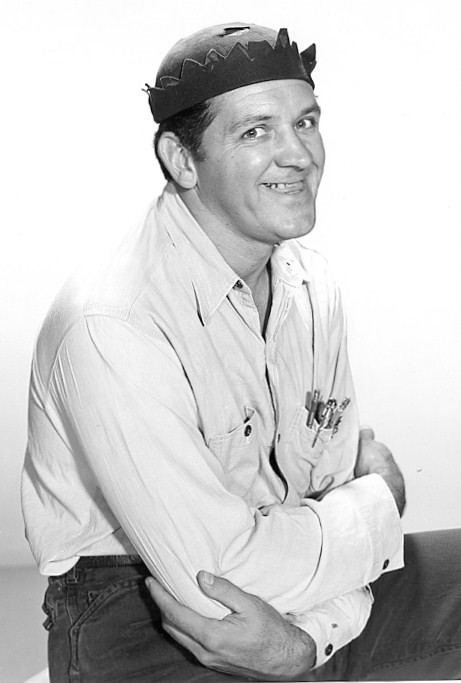
Lindsey as Goober in The Andy Griffith Show

=== Star Trek, cast as Spock ===
During an interview segment of TV Land's 40th Anniversary Star Trek Marathon on November 12, 2006, Leonard Nimoy stated that Gene Roddenberry's first choice to play Spock was George Lindsey. Because of the flippant way Nimoy made the comment, it has been suggested that he was joking. The claim that Lindsey was offered the role is given more credibility when Lindsey's close friend, Ernest Borgnine, wrote in his autobiography,, "my hand to God – he turned down the part of Mr. Spock on TV's Star Trek, the role that made Leonard Nimoy famous."

=== Mayberry R.F.D., and other acting work ===
After Andy Griffith left his television show, CBS retooled it as Mayberry R.F.D. and Lindsey continued to play Goober Pyle until CBS cancelled the program in 1971.

In 1972, Lindsey portrayed Charlie, one of a pair of highwaymen in the Gunsmoke episode "Blind Man's Bluff", and an escaped convict, "The Dove", in an episode of The Rifleman. Disney used his talents in a few projects, both as comedy support in features (Snowball Express, Treasure of Matecumbe) and voiceovers for a few of their animated characters. Three Disney animated features that presented the voice of Lindsey were The Aristocats (1970), Robin Hood (1973) and The Rescuers (1977).

Lindsey appeared in the 1967 Gunsmoke episode "Mad Dog" as one of the Watson Brothers. In 1978, Lindsey was a stand-out guest star on M*A*S*H as Roy Dupree, a wildly obnoxious, but capable Southern surgeon. In 1997 Lindsey played himself in an episode of NewsRadio.

=== As Goober on Hee Haw (1972–1992) ===
Lindsey portrayed Goober for the third and last time on the syndicated country music variety show Hee Haw, playing a more rustic and somewhat smarter version of the character. He appeared on that show from 1972 to 1992.

== Personal life and death ==
Lindsey's marriage to Joyanne Herbert ended in divorce. They had a son, George Jr., and a daughter, Camden Jo Lindsey Gardner, as well as two grandsons. Nashville businesswoman Anne Wilson was Lindsey's companion for many years until his death on May 6, 2012, in Nashville, Tennessee, from heart failure. He was 83. He is buried at Oak Hill Cemetery in his hometown of Jasper, Alabama.

== Honors and citations ==
Lindsey raised over US$1,000,000 for Alabama Special Olympics through 17 years of the George Lindsey Celebrity Weekend and Golf Tournament in Montgomery, Alabama and another $50,000 for the Alabama Association of Retarded Citizens, and participated as Head Coach-Winter Games in the Minneapolis Special Olympics National Competition.

He established and perpetuated the George Lindsey Academic Scholarships at University of North Alabama. In 1992, the university gave him an honorary doctorate.

Lindsey was the 1995 recipient of the Governor's Achievement Award—Alabama Music Hall of Fame. The State of Alabama named the "George Lindsey Highway" in Jasper after the actor. In 1998, he established the George Lindsey/UNA Film Festival that takes place at the University of North Alabama annually in the spring.

He was the 1997 recipient of the Minnie Pearl Lifetime Achievement Award and the 2007 recipient of the first ICON Award presented by the Nashville Associations of Talent Directors.

== Partial filmography ==
- The Rifleman (1963) (Season 5 Episode 22: "Requiem at Mission Springs") as The Dove
- Gunsmoke (1963-1972) (6 episodes)
  - (Season 9 Episode 13: "Pa Hacks Brood") (1963) as Orville
  - (Season 10 Episode 8: "Hung High") (1964) as Bud
  - (Season 10 Episode 33: "Two Tall Men") (1965) as Billy
  - (Season 11 Episode 26: "Which Doctor") (1966) as Skeeter
  - (Season 12 Episode 17: Mad Dog") (1967) as Pinto Watson
  - (Season 17 Episode 22: "Blind Man's Buff") (1972) as Charlie Calvin
- The Alfred Hitchcock Hour (1964) (3 episodes)
  - (Season 2 Episode 17: "The Jar") as Juke Marmer
  - (Season 2 Episode 29: "Bed of Roses") as Sam Kirby
  - (Season 3 Episode 1: "Return of Verge Likens") as D.D. Martin
- Death Valley Days (1964) (Season 12 Episode 24: "The Death and the Fury") as John
- Daniel Boone (1964) (Season 1 Episode 1: "Ken-Tuck-E") as Wigeon
- The Twilight Zone (1964) (Season 5 Episode 26: "I Am the Night – Color Me Black") as Deputy Pierce
- Ensign Pulver (1964) as Lindstrom
- The Joey Bishop Show (1964) (Season 4 Episode 4: "Joey and Larry Split") as Marine
- The Andy Griffith Show (1964–1968) CBS TV Series (86 episodes) as Goober Pyle
- Gomer Pyle U.S.M.C. (1965-1968) (2 episodes) as Goober Pyle
  - (Season 2 Episode 11: "A Visit from Cousin Goober") (1965)
  - (Season 4 Episode 18: "Gomer Goes Home") (1968)
- Mayberry R.F.D. (1968–1971) (71 episodes) as Goober Pyle
- The Aristocats (1970) as Lafayette (voice)
- Snowball Express (1972) as Double L. Dingman
- Charley and the Angel (1973) as Pete, Handyman
- Robin Hood (1973) as Trigger, the Vulture (voice)
- Treasure of Matecumbe (1976) as Coahoma Sheriff
- The Rescuers (1977) as Deadeye, The Rabbit (voice)
- M*A*S*H (TV series) (1978) (Season 6 Episode 21: "Temporary Duty") as Captain Roy Dupree
- Take This Job and Shove It (1981) as Man at Gas Station
- CHiPs (1982) (Season 5 Episode 15: "Bright Flashes") as Wayne Cato
- The American Snitch (1983) as Zeke
- Cannonball Run II (1984) as Uncle Cal
- Return to Mayberry (1986) (TV movie) as Goober Pyle
- NewsRadio (1997) (Season 3 Episode 15: "Rose Bowl") as Himself
- When I Find the Ocean (2006) as Ed Barker (final film role)
- Larry the Cable Guy's Hula-Palooza Christmas Luau as Himself (2009) (final television role)

== Autobiography ==
- Lindsey, George; Beck, Ken; Clark, Jim (1995). Goober in a Nutshell. Avon Books. ISBN 978-0380777396.
