= I, Darrin, Take This Witch, Samantha =

Pilot episode of Bewitched

- Bewitched episode
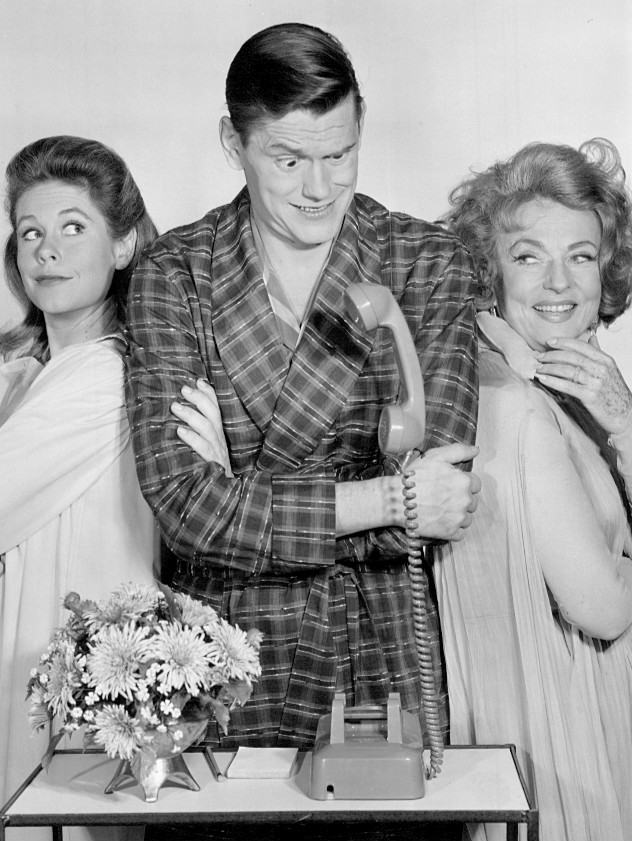
- A promotional photograph for the pilot. Left to right: Elizabeth Montgomery as Samantha, Dick York as Darrin, Agnes Moorehead as Endora.
- Episode no.: Season 1 Episode 1
- Directed by: William Asher
- Written by: Sol Saks
- Narrated by: José Ferrer
- Editing by: Michael Luciano; Gerard Wilson
- Original air date: September 17, 1964
- Running time: 30 minutes

Guest appearances
- Gene Blakely as Dave; C. Lindsay Workman as Doctor Koblin; Paul Barselou as Bartender Al; Nancy Kovack as Sheila Sommers

Episode chronology
← Previous —	Next → "Be It Ever So Mortgaged"

"I, Darrin, Take This Witch, Samantha" (also known simply as "I, Darrin") is the pilot episode of American television series Bewitched. The episode was produced three weeks after starring actress Elizabeth Montgomery gave birth to her first child with her husband, series director William Asher. The episode was written by Sol Saks, the creator of the series, and initially aired September 17, 1964 on ABC. José Ferrer served as the episode's narrator, starting with the words, "Once upon a time...". Ferrer was not credited for this role. In the episode, Samantha Stephens promises her new husband Darrin that she will not use magic, a promise that initiates a pattern that continues into each subsequent episode of the series; the conflict in each episode surrounds Samantha's failed attempts to keep her promise.

The pilot is one of many episodes in the series that demonstrate that Samantha and Darrin have sexual desire for each other; as opposed to being depicted as sleeping in separate beds - as Rob and Laura Petrie are depicted as doing in the concurrently running The Dick Van Dyke Show - Samantha and Darrin are depicted sleeping in the same bed and expressing eagerness to do so. Julie D. O'Reilly writes in her book Bewitched Again: Supernaturally Powerful Women on Television, 1996-2011 that, in "I, Darrin" when Darrin says, "You're a what?" in response to Samantha's statement that she is a witch, this exchange initiated a narrative that would be regularly repeated in television series into the 21st century. O'Reilly argues that this narrative is one in which a sexualized female character demonstrates to a male character that she has superpowers and the male responds with incredulity and no longer thinks of her as a woman but instead as a freak. In "I, Darrin", Nancy Kovack portrayed Darrin's ex-girlfriend Sheila Sommers, and the episode's popularity resulted in Kovack returning to make Sheila a recurring character in the series.

== Bibliography ==
- Breuer, Heidi (2009). Crafting the Witch: Gendering Magic in Medieval and Early Modern England. Routledge. ISBN 9781135868239.
- Gibson, Marion (2007). Witchcraft Myths in American Culture. Taylor & Francis. ISBN 9780415979788.
- Metz, Walter (2007). Bewitched. Wayne State University Press. ISBN 9780814335802.
- Moore, Barbara; Marvin R. Bensman; Jim Van Dyke (2006). Prime-time Television: A Concise History. Greenwood Publishing Group. ISBN 9780275981426.
- Newcomb, Horace (2014). Encyclopedia of Television (2 ed.). Routledge. ISBN 9781135194796.
- O'Reilly, Julie D. (2013). Bewitched Again: Supernaturally Powerful Women on Television, 1996-2011. McFarland & Company. ISBN 9781476601618.
- Pilato, Herbie J. (2012). Twitch Upon a Star: The Bewitched Life and Career of Elizabeth Montgomery. Rowman & Littlefield. ISBN 9781589797505.
- Pilato, Herbie J. (2013). The Essential Elizabeth Montgomery: A Guide to Her Magical Performances. Rowman & Littlefield. ISBN 9781589798250.
- Spangler, Lynn C. (2003). Television Women from Lucy to Friends: Fifty Years of Sitcoms and Feminism. Greenwood Publishing Group. ISBN 9780313287817.
- Weaver, Tom (2000). Return of the B Science Fiction and Horror Heroes: The Mutant Melding of Two Volumes of Classic Interviews. McFarland & Company. ISBN 9780786407552.
