= Tabitha (TV series) =

American sitcom

- Genre: Fantasy sitcom
- Created by: Jerry Mayer
- Directed by: Charles S. Dubin; William Asher; Charles R. Rondeau; Murray Golden; Herb Wallerstein; George Tyne; Bruce Bilson
- Starring: Lisa Hartman; Robert Urich; Mel Stewart; David Ankrum; Karen Morrow
- Theme music composer: Jeff Barry
- Opening theme: "It Could Be Magic" performed by Lisa Hartman
- Ending theme: "It Could Be Magic"
- Composers: Shorty Rogers; Dick DeBenedictis; Allyn Ferguson (first pilot); Jack Elliott (first pilot)
- Country of origin: United States
- Original language: English
- No. of seasons: 1
- No. of episodes: 11 (and 2 pilots)

Production
- Executive producer: Jerry Mayer
- Producers: Robert Stambler; William Asher; George Yanok
- Cinematography: Richard A. Kelly; Gerald Finnerman; Irving Lippman; Donald H. Birnkrant; Al Francis
- Running time: 22–24 minutes
- Production companies: Columbia Pictures Television; Ashmont Productions

Original release
- Network: ABC
- Release: September 10, 1977 – January 14, 1978

Tabitha is an American fantasy sitcom and a spin-off of Bewitched that aired on ABC from September 10, 1977, to January 14, 1978. The series starred Lisa Hartman in the title role as Tabitha Stephens, the witch daughter of Samantha and Darrin Stephens who was introduced on Bewitched during its second season.

In the series, Tabitha is portrayed as a young woman working as a production assistant at a television station and living in Los Angeles. The supporting cast includes David Ankrum as Tabitha's brother, Adam, with whom she works; Karen Morrow as Tabitha's and Adam's meddlesome aunt, Minerva; Robert Urich as Paul Thurston, an egomaniacal and womanizing talk show host who is a sometime love interest for Tabitha; and Mel Stewart as Tabitha's and Adam's cranky, but lovable boss Marvin Decker. Unlike Bewitched, which was a hit for ABC and aired for eight seasons, Tabitha failed to catch on with viewers and was canceled after twelve episodes.

== Overview ==
Tabitha originated as a pilot that aired on ABC on April 24, 1976. The episode starred Liberty Williams in the title role. Bruce Kimmel portrayed her brother, Adam Stephens. The major difference between the pilot and the series was that Adam was a full-fledged and mischievous warlock in the pilot, but was made a mortal for the series (thus making him the disapproving figure as Darrin had been). In the first pilot, Tabitha was an editorial assistant for the fictional Trend magazine, lived in San Francisco, and had a boyfriend named Cliff (Archie Hahn). She also contended with the supernatural antics of Adam. In situations that were very similar to "I, Darrin, Take This Witch, Samantha", the pilot episode of Bewitched, Tabitha tells Cliff that she is a witch. At first he does not believe her, but later discovers that she is telling the truth. Also, much like her mother did when she used her powers to deflect the unwanted affections of Sheila Sommers, her father's former fiancée, Tabitha deflects rival Dinah Nichols (Barbara Rhoades) from seducing Cliff.

The first pilot (directed by Bewitched producer/director William Asher) did not sell the series. A second pilot starring Lisa Hartman was produced that interested ABC who bought the series. In the second version, Hartman replaced Liberty Williams as Tabitha Stephens, the daughter of Samantha and Darrin. Tabitha is now a twenty something witch working as a production assistant at KXLA (which should not be confused with the real KXLA) television station in Los Angeles. Working with her is her now older and mortal brother Adam (David Ankrum) who admonishes her use of witchcraft. Her previously unmentioned Aunt Minerva (Karen Morrow) pops in frequently to encourage her to use her witchcraft. Robert Urich is Tabitha's boss and romantic interest.

The revised Tabitha pilot aired on ABC on May 7, 1977. The series debuted on the fall schedule on September 10, 1977.

William Asher, who worked on the first pilot, had little to do with the second version of the series. While he directed a few episodes, namely the ones that feature Bernard Fox, George Tobias, and Sandra Gould as their original Bewitched characters, he otherwise remained as an advisor.

The series is explicitly set in the mid-late 1970s; even though footage of Tabitha as a toddler from the original series is incorporated into the opening credits and, as noted below, several characters from the original series made guest appearances played by their original actors, no narrative attempt is made to reconcile how someone born in the mid-1960s could be a college graduate in her early 20s only a decade later.

== Characters ==
=== Main ===
- Tabitha Stephens (Lisa Hartman) is the main character; she is the daughter of Samantha and Darrin Stephens and twitches her nose, much like her mother does, to invoke her magic spells.
- Adam Stephens (David Ankrum) is Tabitha's older brother, although originally, he was younger; he is the son of Samantha and Darrin Stephens, is against Tabitha using witchcraft (much like Darrin, their father, was), and persuades Tabitha not to use her magic. He does love his sister, though.
- Aunt Minerva (Karen Morrow) is Adam's and Tabitha's aunt; she is a meddlesome, but well-meaning busy-body and encourages Tabitha to use her magic; she is the mother figure for Tabitha, in lieu of Samantha and Endora.
- Paul Thurston (Robert Urich) is the egotistical, somewhat obnoxious host of The Paul Thurston Show on the fictional TV station KXLA, where Tabitha works as a production assistant; he is a love interest for Tabitha, but it does not stop him from being a womanizer.
- Marvin Decker (Mel Stewart) is producer of The Paul Thurston Show and Tabitha's cranky but lovable boss at KXLA.

=== Guest stars ===
Some Bewitched characters appeared on Tabitha. In the episode, "Tabitha's Weighty Problem", Bernard Fox reprises his role as Dr. Bombay, and again in the last episode, "Tabitha's Party", in which the character's first name, "Hubert" is revealed. The sixth episode, "The Arrival of Nancy", features George Tobias and Sandra Gould as Abner and Gladys Kravitz respectively. The episode marked Tobias' final acting role before his retirement and his subsequent death three years later. Dick Wilson, who played "various drunks" on Bewitched, appeared in the episodes "Halloween Show" and "Tabitha's Party". Mary Grace Canfield, who appeared on four episodes of Bewitched as Abner Kravitz's sister Harriet Kravitz, also guest starred as another character. Other guest stars were Werner Klemperer, Dack Rambo, Tracy Reed, Mary Wickes, and Fred Willard. In addition, photographs and footage of twin sisters Diane Murphy and Erin Murphy as Tabitha from the original Bewitched series were incorporated into the opening credits sequence.

== Episodes ==
=== Pilots (1976 and 1977) ===
Title	Original release date
"Tabatha"	April 24, 1976
Tabatha receives a visit from her brother Adam (a warlock in this version). Meanwhile, she tells her boyfriend and co-worker Cliff that she is a witch. Liberty (Louise) Williams played Tabitha who is an Editorial Assistant in this first Pilot show that aired in 1976.
"Tabitha"	May 7, 1977
Tabitha has booked a guest for Paul Thurston's talk show. He is Andrew Collins, author of a book on energy conservation. Paul would rather interview former beauty contestant Sherry McBride. Tabitha has to convince Paul about the importance of the world's dwindling energy reserves. Lisa Hartman plays Tabitha in this second Pilot show.

=== Season 1 (1977–78) ===
No.	Title	Original release date
1	"Tabitha's Weighty Problem"	September 10, 1977
Adam is tasked with supervising a highly prestigious international weight lifting competition. Tabitha gets to escort Soviet World Champion Vasily Kasseroff, who has amorous intentions. Unfortunately, Tabitha is ill and her magic is out of control. It is time for a visit from Dr. Bombay.
2	"Halloween Show"	November 12, 1977
While on his show, Paul makes snide comments on the possible existence of witches. This enrages Cassandra, head of a witches' coven. She has Paula, a hit-witch, make life miserable for Paul, and Paul gets to spend Halloween in the form of a werewolf.
3	"A Star Is Born"	November 19, 1977
Wanda, the new weathergirl, treats Tabitha as a servant. Aunt Minerva takes it personally and arranges for Wanda to quit. Tabitha replaces her as weathergirl and her good looks make her a hit with the audience. But she is uncomfortable in the role of a sex symbol.
4	"Minerva Goes Straight"	November 26, 1977
Minerva has had a number of disappointing dates with warlocks and feels frustrated. Tabitha suggests that Minerva try doing things the mortal way, so Minerva gets a secretarial job at the television station. She also joins Tabitha and Paul on a ski vacation and falls for instructor Jean Claude LeMatt. The man is quick to charm her, but has a deserving reputation as a womanizer.
5	"Mr. Nice Guy"	December 10, 1977
Paul has been a love interest to Tabitha for a while, but his arrogance turns her off. Eager to play match-maker, Aunt Minerva devises a spell to turn him nicer. Too nice that is. Paul now acts as a pushover in both his personal and professional life, including donating his possessions to charity. A concerned Tabitha tries to determine what is wrong with him.
6	"The Arrival of Nancy"	December 17, 1977
Nancy Kravitz, niece of Abner and Gladys Kravitz, arrives in California and seeks the help of her childhood friend Tabitha in making it on her own. Her childlike naivety consistently places her in dangerous situations. She finally finds her calling as a parking enforcement officer.
7	"Tabitha's Triangle"	December 24, 1977
Tabitha is involved in a love triangle. Her first suitor is handsome political candidate Ted Bingham who views her as his future First Lady. Her second suitor is a clearly jealous Paul. A truth spell from Aunt Minerva fails to clear things as both men seem sincere.
8	"That New Black Magic"	December 31, 1977
Tabitha is visited by Portia, a witch who used to go to high school with her. Portia has a thing for older men and sets her sights on seducing happily married producer Marvin Decker. Tabitha, on the other hand, decides to help Lorraine Decker regain the affections of her husband.
9	"What's Wrong with Mister Right?"	December 31, 1977
Paul and Tabitha agree to work on a television commercial for a pizza place. Tabitha gets to meet charming director Jeff Baron and sparks fly. Meanwhile, Aunt Minerva has set Tabitha up on a blind date with warlock Monty the Magnificent. When Monty learns that Tabitha has no taste for warlocks, he poses as a mortal and frames Jeff as a warlock.
10	"Paul Goes to New York"	January 7, 1978
Paul ends one of his shows with a surprise announcement. He is quitting his Los Angeles talk show and moving to New York City to host a game show. Tabitha arranges for successful gossip columnist Renee Cummings to replace Paul as the new talk show host. When Renee proves catty and impossible to work with, Tabitha decides to arrange Paul's return.
11	"Tabitha's Party"	January 14, 1978
It is the 25 anniversary of Darrin and Samantha Stephens' wedding and the Witches' Council is impressed with its endurance. In fact, it wants to repeat the experiment by arranging another mixed marriage. Cassandra has decided on Tabitha as the bride and Minerva on Paul as the groom. A love potion is created and placed at a party at the television station, resulting in confusion. Tabitha calls Dr. Bombay and he gives her an antidote for the love potion gone wrong, and she has Cassandra marry Dr. Bombay and his mortal nurse, Gloria.

== Reception and cancellation ==
In an unusual move, ABC aired the pilot episode during the summer before the Fall 1977-1978 television season on May 7, 1977. The second episode, “Tabitha’s Weighty Problem”, then aired during the Fall television season on September 10, 1977. The series was then preempted for several weeks with the third episode finally airing on November 12. The series then began airing regularly thereafter, on Saturdays at 8 p.m. EST (opposite the final seasons of The Bob Newhart Show on CBS and The Bionic Woman on NBC). Ratings were initially good but began to drop off midway through the first season. In January 1978, ABC moved Tabitha from its Saturday night spot to Fridays at 8 p.m. (typically known as the Friday night death slot) where ratings continued to fall. The series ended its season ranked 81st out of 104 programs with a 14.8 Nielsen. It was the second lowest-rated program on the network's schedule. ABC canceled the series shortly thereafter, though reruns aired through August 1978.

== Production notes ==
The pilot episode of Tabitha was produced by Ashmont Productions (the company owned by Elizabeth Montgomery and William Asher), and filmed at The Burbank Studios in Burbank, California. It was filmed with a single-camera with an added laugh track. After production of the pilot in 1976, Ashmont was closed down.

The series' theme song, "It Could Be Magic", was written by Jeff Barry and performed by Lisa Hartman. Jack Elliott, Allyn Ferguson and Dick DeBenedictis did the instrumental themes for the pilot episodes.

== Home media ==
In 2005, to coincide with the release of the first season of Bewitched on DVD (and the release of the Bewitched feature film), Sony Pictures Home Entertainment released the entire run of Tabitha on DVD. The original Liberty Williams pilot is included as a special feature.

== Sources ==
- Metz, Walter (2007), "An Industrial History of Bewitched", Bewitched, Wayne State University Press, ISBN 978-0814335802
