= Screen Gems Network =

American television programming block (1999–2002)

- Logo used from 1999–2002, based on the 1992 Columbia Pictures logo
- Developed by: Barry Thurston
- Narrated by: Billy West
- Theme music composer: Peter Himmelman
- Country of origin: United States
- Original language: English

Production
- Executive producers: Douglas Ross; Greg Stewart; J. Rupert Thompson
- Production companies: Evolution Media; Columbia TriStar Domestic Television (Note: Credited as Columbia TriStar Television Distribution (1999–2001).)

Original release
- Network: Syndication
- Release: September 20, 1999 – September 9, 2002

The Screen Gems Network (SGN) is an American afternoon television programming block that ran in syndication from September 20, 1999, to September 9, 2002, and a production of Evolution Media, 1999–2001 produced in association with Columbia TriStar Television Distribution, and 2001–2002 produced in association with Columbia TriStar Domestic Television. The concept for the program was announced on January 11, 1999 and it began airing on September 20, 1999; for the block's first season, only half-hour sitcoms were part of the block, with the second season expanding to include hour-long drama shows. (While not part of the Screen Gems Network itself, CTTD and Evolution also produced 130 half-hour compilations of shorts featuring The Three Stooges in a similar manner to that of the Screen Gems Network.)

SGN was the first broadcast-based service airing classic shows from the Columbia Pictures Television vault, airing shows with a resource base of 58,000 episodes of 350 television series from the 1950s to 1980s, included were shows created by Columbia Pictures Television, Tandem Productions, and ELP Communications. The announcer of the program was Billy West, who was tapped by CTTD to be the announcer for the program on August 11, 1999.

Programs were creatively grouped for theme weeks such as "Love is in the Air", "Pilots", "Best Music Videos" and "Before They Were Stars". Holiday based theme weeks include promotions for Halloween, Christmas, Mother's Day and Father's Day, among others.

The block was intended to be carried by stations in daytime slots, primarily afternoon and early evenings; for instance, WNYW in New York ran the block at 2 p.m., while WUAB in Cleveland aired it at 11 a.m. The block covered 62% of the country by March 1999; this number had risen to 80% of the stations carrying it by January 2000. The block was still being advertised by CTTD as late as May 2001.

== List of series aired ==
=== Screen Gems ===
- Father Knows Best (1954–1960)
- The Donna Reed Show (1958–1966)
- Hazel (1961–1966)
- Bewitched (1964–1972)
- I Dream of Jeannie (1965–1970)
- Gidget (1965–1966)
- The Monkees (1966–1968)
- The Flying Nun (1967–1970)
- Here Come the Brides (1968–1970)
- The Partridge Family (1970–1974)
- The Paul Lynde Show (1972–1973)
- The Farmer's Daughter (1963–1966)
- Hawk (1966)
- Batfink (1966–1967)
- Iron Horse (1966–1968)

=== Columbia Pictures Television ===
- Starsky & Hutch (1975–1979)
- Charlie's Angels (1976–1981)
- What's Happening!! (1976–1979)
- Fantasy Island (1977–1984)
- Benson (1979–1986)
- What's Happening Now!! (1985–1988)

=== Tandem Productions ===
- All in the Family (1971–1979)
- Maude (1972–1978)
- Sanford and Son (1972–1977)
- Good Times (1974–1979)
- Diff'rent Strokes (1978–1986)
- Sanford (1980–1981)

=== ELP Communications ===
- The Jeffersons (1975–1985)
- One Day at a Time (1975–1984)
- The Facts of Life (1979–1988)
- Silver Spoons (1982–1987)

== Paired series ==
- Bewitched & I Dream of Jeannie
- The Partridge Family & The Monkees
- The Jeffersons & Benson
