= Screen Gems =

American film studio

Screen Gems, Inc.
- Industry: Television (1948–1974); Film (1998–present)
- Founded: November 1948; 78 years ago (television division); December 8, 1998; 27 years ago (film subsidiary)
- Defunct: May 6, 1974; 52 years ago (television division)
- Parent: Columbia Pictures (1948–1974); Sony Pictures (1998–present)

Screen Gems is an American film production company of Sony Pictures, a subsidiary of the Japanese conglomerate, Sony Group Corporation. The Screen Gems division at Columbia Pictures lot has served several different purposes for its parent companies over the decades since its incorporation, initially as a television studio that was active from November 1948 to May 6, 1974, and later on as a film studio that was refounded on December 8, 1998. Screen Gems serves as a film production division of Sony that specializes in genre films, mainly horror.

Screen Gems is one of the five live-action film divisions of the Sony Pictures Motion Picture Group, alongside Columbia Pictures, TriStar Pictures, Sony Pictures Classics, and 3000 Pictures.

== Origin of name: Screen Gems animation studio (1933–1946) ==
The brand name "Screen Gems" was first used by Columbia Pictures as the name of their animation division, formerly known as the Charles Mintz Studio before 1933. Columbia acquired a partial interest in Mintz' operation that year and gave it its new name, assuming full ownership by 1939.

After Mintz's death in late 1939, he was succeeded as head of Screen Gems by a long line of producers and executives, among them Mintz's brother-in-law George Winkler, veteran animation directors such as Frank Tashlin and Dave Fleischer, and the team of Raymond Katz and Henry Binder, former assistants to Looney Tunes producer Leon Schlesinger. Never as successful as its competitors in the theatrical cartoon field, Screen Gems was dissolved in 1946, and Columbia instead contracted to release the output of the revolutionary United Productions of America (UPA) animation studio starting in 1948.

== Television subsidiary (1948–1974) ==
Screen Gems, Inc.
- Final logo, used from 1965 to 1974. This logo was designed by Chermayeff & Geismar.
- Type: Subsidiary
- Industry: Television production Television syndication
- Predecessor: Pioneer Telefilms, Inc.
- Founded: November 1948; 78 years ago
- Founder: Ralph Cohn
- Defunct: May 6, 1974; 52 years ago
- Fate: Renamed as Columbia Pictures Television
- Successors: Studio: Columbia Pictures Television; Library: NBCUniversal Syndication Studios (pre-1948 Universal Pictures library only); Warner Bros. Television Studios (pre-1969 Hanna-Barbera library only)
- Headquarters: New York City, Los Angeles, California, United States
- Area served: Worldwide
- Parent: Columbia Pictures

=== Pioneer Telefilms and early years (1947–1954) ===
In 1947, Ralph Cohn, the son of Columbia co-founder Jack Cohn and nephew of Columbia head Harry Cohn, founded Pioneer Telefilms, a television commercial production company. Ralph later wrote a 50-page memorandum arguing that Columbia should be the first major film studio to move into television.

Although Harry Cohn was not convinced by the suggestion, Columbia invested $50,000 in acquiring Pioneer and reorganized it as Screen Gems. The studio started its new business in New York City on April 15, 1949.

By 1951, Screen Gems became a full-fledged television studio by producing and syndicating several popular shows (see below). Within a few months, Ralph Cohn had sold a half-hour dramatic anthology concept to the Ford Motor Company, which became Ford Theatre, one of the first times a major Hollywood movie studio had produced content for television. They also produced seven episodes of the first season of Cavalcade of America.

In 1952, John H. Mitchell joined Screen Gems productions as one of its original employees.

The name "Screen Gems", at the time, was used to hide the fact that the film studio was entering television production and distribution. Many film studios viewed television as a threat to their business, thus they were expected to shun the medium. However, Columbia was one of a few studios that branched out to television under a pseudonym to conceal the true ownership of the television arm, until 1955, when Columbia decided to use the woman from its logo under the Screen Gems banner, officially billing itself as a part of "the Hollywood studios of Columbia Pictures", as spoken in announcements at the end of some Screen Gems series.

By 1952, the studio had produced a series of about 100 film-record coordinated releases for television under the brand "TV Disk Jockey Toons" in which the films "synchronize perfectly with the records".

=== Rising success (1954–1968) ===
In 1954, the studio started producing Father Knows Best on CBS and The Adventures of Rin Tin Tin on ABC, which became their biggest successes at the time.

On July 1, 1956, studio veteran Irving Briskin stepped down as stage manager of Columbia Pictures and formed his own production company, Briskin Productions, Inc., to release series through Screen Gems and supervise all of its productions. On December 10, 1956, Screen Gems expanded into television syndication by acquiring Hygo Television Films (Serials Inc.) and its affiliated company United Television Films, Inc. Hygo Television Films was founded in 1951 by Jerome Hyams, who also acquired United Television Films in 1955 that was founded by Archie Mayers.

During that year, the studio began syndicating Columbia Pictures' theatrical film library to television, including the series of two-reel short subjects starring the Three Stooges in 1957. Earlier on August 2, 1957, they also secured syndication rights to "Shock Theater", a package of Universal Pictures horror films (later shifted to MCA TV), which was enormously successful in reviving that genre. The company also distributed Universal Pictures' other films (pre-1948 sound films) around that time.

From 1958 to 1974, under President John H. Mitchell and Vice President of Production Harry Ackerman, Screen Gems delivered TV shows and sitcoms such as Dennis the Menace, The Donna Reed Show, Hazel, Here Come the Brides, Mr. Smith Goes to Washington, Gidget, Bewitched, I Dream of Jeannie, The Flying Nun, The Monkees, The Girl with Something Extra, and The Partridge Family.

It was also the first distributor for Hanna-Barbera Productions, an animation studio founded by William Hanna and Joseph Barbera after leaving Metro-Goldwyn-Mayer. The agreement was signed up in 1957, and it was also the distributor of the Soupy Sales show. The company also entered a co-production deal with Canada's CTV Television Network and produced several shows, many of which were filmed or taped in Toronto for distribution to Canadian stations (Showdown, The Pierre Berton Show). The company even expanded as far as Australia, opening Screen Gems Australia to produce shows for that country's networks, including The Graham Kennedy Show for the Nine Network.

In the late 1950s, Screen Gems also entered into ownership and operation of television stations. Stations owned by Screen Gems over the years included KCPX (Salt Lake City; now KTVX, owned by Nexstar Media Group), WVUE-DT (New Orleans; now owned by Gray Television), WAPA-TV (San Juan; now owned by the Hemisphere Media Group), WNJU (Linden, NJ; now Telemundo/NBCUniversal O&O), and several radio stations, as well, including 50,000-watt clear channel WWVA (Wheeling, WV; now owned by iHeartMedia). As a result, in funding its acquisitions, 18% of Screen Gems' shares were spun off from Columbia and it became a publicly traded company on the NYSE until 1968. Screen Gems also provided technical assistance and partial control of a private television station in Venezuela, Canal 11 Televisión, which existed from 1966 to 1968.

In 1961, the company expanded into live and tape programming by keeping Herbert Sussan Associates, whose founder worked with the company from 1958 to 1960, and around the same time, the company entered into a partnership with Aladan Productions, a company formed by Dan Enright and Alfred Crown, following the game show scandals, to develop its taped and live television programming. Enright was later hired by Screen Gems in 1964 and left after 10 years in 1974, not long after Screen Gems renaming it to Columbia Pictures Television, to join Jack Barry Productions, a company Barry formed following the scandals.

In 1963, William Dozier, who was one of the top Screen Gems' employees, and senior vice president of production, left to start Greenway Productions, with a nonexclusive agreement with the studio for joint distribution of its TV productions. Even though none of Greenway's shows went to SG, Greenway immediately struck a deal with rival television producer 20th Century-Fox Television in 1964.

In 1963, Screen Gems entered music publishing with the purchase of Don Kirshner's Aldon Music, with Kirshner named head of the Columbia-Screen Gems music division. Four years later, he departed Screen Gems after coming into conflict with The Monkees over their desire to play on their records. Lester Sill replaced Kirshner and remained head of music publishing until 1985. Screen Gems-Columbia Music was sold to EMI for $23.5 million in 1976.

From 1964 to 1969, former child star Jackie Cooper was vice president of program development. He was responsible for packaging series (such as Bewitched) and other projects and selling them to the networks.

For the 1965–1966 season, Screen Gems announced that it would sign three big creative programmers to develop new series, which was announced in June 1964. Among them was writer Sidney Sheldon, director Hy Averback, and writer David Swift.

In 1965, Columbia Pictures acquired a 50% interest in New York-based commercial production company EUE, which was incorporated into Screen Gems and renamed EUE/Screen Gems. The studios were sold in 1982 to longtime Columbia Pictures executive George Cooney shortly after Columbia Pictures was sold to the Coca-Cola Company.

=== Merger with Columbia Pictures and reincorporation as Columbia Pictures Television (1968–1974) ===
On December 23, 1968, Screen Gems merged with its parent company Columbia Pictures Corporation and became part of the newly formed Columbia Pictures Industries, Inc. for $24.5 million.

In the following year, former ABC vice president of programming Leonard Goldberg joined Screen Gems, displacing Jackie Cooper as vice president of program development. Goldberg failed to receive the same level of success as Cooper. His shows all tanked after one season, with the exception of The Partridge Family, and he abruptly left after three years, with the most notable other production of Goldberg's tenure at Screen Gems being the 1971 television movie Brian's Song. He then formed a production company with producer Aaron Spelling.

In 1971, Douglas S. Cramer, former executive VP in charge of production at Paramount Television, set up a SG-affiliated production firm, The Douglas S. Cramer Company, to produce projects for feature films and TV projects via Columbia Pictures. In 1972, David Gerber, who had left 20th Century Fox Television, set up a SG-affiliated production company to produce his own projects with that company. The most notable of these productions was Police Story, an NBC police crime drama. In 1973, Allan Blye and Chris Bearde via Blye-Bearde Productions signed an independent production agreement with Screen Gems to develop their own projects. Also that year, Harry Ackerman, who was vice president of production left the studio to start his own production company to be affiliated with Paramount Television.

On May 6, 1974, Screen Gems was renamed to Columbia Pictures Television as suggested by then-studio president David Gerber, who succeeded Art Frankel as his studio president. The final notable production from this incarnation of Screen Gems before the name change was the 1974 miniseries QB VII. Columbia was, technically, the last major studio to enter television by name.

=== Later years and aftermath ===
Changes in corporate ownership of Columbia Pictures came in 1982, when Coca-Cola bought the company. In the mid-1980s, Coca-Cola reorganized its television holdings to create Coca-Cola Television, merging CPT with the television unit of Embassy Communications as Columbia/Embassy Television, although both companies continued to use separate identities for a few years. Following the formation of Columbia Pictures Entertainment, Inc., it and Tri-Star Television were merged to create a new Columbia Pictures Television. Merv Griffin Enterprises was also integrated into Coca-Cola Television. CPT also ran Colex Enterprises, a joint venture with LBS Communications that distributed most of the Screen Gems library and operated from 1984 to 1987.

In 1985, the Screen Gems name was brought back by Columbia Pictures Television to distribute classic television series from its vaults to first-run syndication.

On December 18, 1987, Coca-Cola spun off its entertainment holdings, selling them to Tri-Star Pictures, Inc. for $3.1 billion. Tri-Star was renamed as Columbia Pictures Entertainment, Inc. In 1989, Sony Corporation of Japan purchased Columbia Pictures Entertainment. On August 11, 1991, Columbia Pictures Entertainment was renamed as Sony Pictures Entertainment as a film production-distribution subsidiary and subsequently combined CPT with a revived TriStar Television on February 21, 1994 to form Columbia TriStar Television. The name "Screen Gems" was also utilized for a syndicated hour-long program for classic television called Screen Gems Network that first aired in 1999 and ran until 2002.

The television division is known as Sony Pictures Television.

=== Television series ===
Television programs produced and/or syndicated by Screen Gems:

- The Ford Television Theatre (1948–1957)
- Cavalcade of America
- The George Burns and Gracie Allen Show (syndicated reruns of filmed episodes from 1952 to 1958)
- Art Linkletter's House Party (produced by John Guedel, 1952–1969)
- Captain Midnight [later rebranded on television as Jet Jackson, Flying Commando] (1954–1956)
- The Adventures of Rin Tin Tin (produced by Herbert B. Leonard, 1954–1959)
- Father Knows Best (1954–1960; Sony surrendered the rights to the estate of Robert Young) (CBS (1954–1955, 1958–1960)/NBC (1955–1958))
- Tales of the Texas Rangers (1955–1957)
- Treasure Hunt (1956–1959)
- Playhouse 90 (selected filmed episodes, 1956–1960)
- Celebrity Playhouse (1955–1956)
- Jungle Jim (1955–1956)
- Ranch Party (1957–1958)
- Jefferson Drum (produced by Mark Goodson-Bill Todman Productions) (1958)
- The Donna Reed Show (1958–1966; Sony surrendered the rights to the estate of Donna Reed) (ABC)
- Rescue 8 (1958–1960)
- Naked City (produced by Herbert B. Leonard) (1958–1963; Sony surrendered the rights to the estate of Herbert B. Leonard; produced by Shelle Productions) (ABC)
- Behind Closed Doors (1958–1959) (NBC)
- Tightrope (1959–1960) (CBS)
- Dennis the Menace (1959–1963) (CBS)
- The Three Stooges [190 two-reel short films produced 1934–1958] (1959–1974; distributed thereafter by other Columbia/Sony divisions)
- Two Faces West (1960–1961) (Syndication)
- My Sister Eileen (1960–1961) (CBS)
- Route 66 (produced by Herbert B. Leonard) (1960–1964; Sony surrendered the rights to the estate of Herbert B. Leonard; produced by Lancer-Edling Productions) (CBS)
- Hazel (1961–1966) (NBC (1961-1965), CBS (1965-1966))
- Shannon (1961–1962) (Syndication)
- Line 'em Up (1962–1963) (CTV)
- Empire (1962–1963; produced by Wilrich Productions) (NBC)
- Our Man Higgins (1962–1963; produced by The First Company of Writers) (ABC)
- Grindl (1963–1964; produced by David Swift Productions)
- The Farmer's Daughter (1963–1966; Based on the 1947 movie produced by RKO Pictures) (ABC)
- Bewitched (1964–1972; produced by Ashmont Productions 1971–1972)
- Days of Our Lives (produced by Corday Productions 1965–1974; produced thereafter by Columbia Pictures Television, Columbia TriStar Television and Sony Pictures Television)
- Camp Runamuck (1965–1966)
- Gidget (1965–1966)
- The Soupy Sales Show (1965–1966; produced by WNEW-TV in New York City)
- I Dream of Jeannie (1965–1970; produced by Sidney Sheldon Productions) (NBC)
- Morning Star (1965–1966; in conjunction with Corday Productions)
- The Wackiest Ship in the Army (1965–1966)
- Hawk (1966)
- Love on a Rooftop (1966–1967)
- The Monkees (1966–1968; produced by Raybert Productions; owned by Warner Music Group via subsidiary Rhino Entertainment, with Sony Pictures Television retaining domestic syndication rights)
- Adventures of the Seaspray (1967; produced by Pacific Films)
- Everybody's Talking (1967)
- The Flying Nun (1967–1970)
- The Second Hundred Years (1967–1968)
- Here Come the Brides (1968–1970)
- The Ugliest Girl in Town (1968–1969)
- The Johnny Cash Show (1969–1970)
- Playboy After Dark (1969–1970; produced by Playboy Enterprises)
- Nancy (1970–1971; produced by Sidney Sheldon Productions)
- The Partridge Family (1970–1974)
- The Young Rebels (1970–1971; produced by Aaron Spelling)
- Getting Together (1971–1972)
- The Good Life (1971–1972; produced by Lorimar Television)
- Bridget Loves Bernie (1972–1973)
- Ghost Story (1972–1973; produced by William Castle Productions)
- The Paul Lynde Show (1972–1973; produced by Ashmont Productions)
- Temperatures Rising (1972–1973; produced by Ashmont Productions)
- Needles and Pins (1973)
- The New Temperatures Rising Show (1973–1974; produced by Ashmont Productions)
- The Young and the Restless (produced by Bell Dramatic Serial Company and Corday Productions 1973–1974; produced thereafter by Columbia Pictures Television, Columbia TriStar Television and Sony Pictures Television)
- Bob & Carol & Ted & Alice (1973–1974)
- Police Story (produced by David Gerber Productions 1973–1974; produced thereafter by Columbia Pictures Television from 1974 to 1977)
- The Girl with Something Extra (1973–1974)
- Sale of the Century (1973–1974)
- That's My Mama (1974–1975; Slated to be a Screen Gems production but produced by its successor; Columbia Pictures Television)
- Nakia (1974–1975; Slated to be a Screen Gems production but produced by its successor; Columbia Pictures Television)
- Police Woman (1974–1978; Slated to be a Screen Gems production but produced by its successor; Columbia Pictures Television)
- Born Free (1974–1975; Slated to be a Screen Gems production but produced by its successor; Columbia Pictures Television)

=== Films ===
- Head (1968; based on The Monkees)

=== Hanna-Barbera Productions ===
==== TV series/specials ====
Note: (*) = Owned by Warner Bros. Entertainment via subsidiary Turner Entertainment Co.

- The Ruff and Reddy Show (1957–1960)*
- The Huckleberry Hound Show (1958–1961)*
- The Quick Draw McGraw Show (1959–1961)*
- The Flintstones (1960–1966)*
- The Yogi Bear Show (1961–1962)*
- Top Cat (1961–1962)*
- The Hanna-Barbera New Cartoon Series (1962–1963)*
- The Jetsons (1962–1963)*
- The Magilla Gorilla Show (1964–1967)*
- Jonny Quest (1964–1965)*
- The Peter Potamus Show (1964–1966)*
- The Atom Ant/Secret Squirrel Show (1965–1967)*
- Alice in Wonderland or What's a Nice Kid Like You Doing in a Place Like This? (1966)*
- Frankenstein Jr. and The Impossibles (1966-1967)*
- Space Ghost and Dino Boy (1966–1967)*
- The Space Kidettes (1966-1967)*
- The Pebbles and Bamm-Bamm Show (1971-1972)*
- The Flintstone Comedy Hour/The Flintstone Comedy Show (1972-1974)*
- Yogi's Ark Lark (1972)*
- Gidget Makes the Wrong Connection (1972)
- Tabitha and Adam and the Clown Family (1972)
- Jeannie (1973)
- Partridge Family 2200 A.D. (1974)

==== Theatrical shorts and films ====
Note: All of these are owned by Warner Bros. Entertainment.

- Loopy De Loop (1959–1964; theatrical shorts)
- Hey There, It's Yogi Bear! (1964; feature film based on The Yogi Bear Show)
- The Man Called Flintstone (1966; feature film based on The Flintstones)

=== Briskin Productions ===
- Goodyear Theatre (1957–1960)
- Alcoa Theatre (1957–1960)
- Casey Jones (1958)
- The Donna Reed Show (1958–1966; full rights belong to the estate of Donna Reed since 2008)
- Manhunt (1959–1961)

== Specialty feature film studio (1998–present) ==
Screen Gems, Inc.
- Logo and byline used since 1999 and 2014, respectively
- Type: Division
- Industry: Film
- Predecessor: SVS Films; Triumph Films
- Founded: December 8, 1998; 27 years ago
- Headquarters: 10202 West Washington Boulevard, Culver City, California, United States
- Area served: Worldwide
- Key people: Fede Goldenberg (President)
- Parent: Sony Pictures Entertainment
- Subsidiaries: Scream Gems

On December 8, 1998, Screen Gems was resurrected as a fourth speciality film-producing arm of Sony's Columbia TriStar Motion Picture Group. It was created after Triumph Films, and before that, SVS Films closed. Screen Gems produces and releases "films that fall between the wide-release films traditionally developed and distributed by Columbia Pictures and those released by Sony Pictures Classics". Many of its releases are of the horror, thriller, action, drama, comedy and urban genres.

As of 2023, Resident Evil: The Final Chapter (2016) is Screen Gems' highest-grossing film with over $300 million worldwide in box office earnings.

=== History ===
In 1997, Sony's former low budget film label Triumph Films closed, due to many of its films underperforming at the box office. After Triumph's demise, Sony acquired a spree of low-budget genre films for release under the Columbia Pictures and TriStar Pictures labels, like Love Walked In, Homegrown, Dancer, Texas Pop. 81, Knock Off, Vampires, Jawbreaker and Cruel Intentions.

In 1998, Screen Gems was resurrected as a film label for genre films, after a similar label for genre films, Triumph Films, and before that SVS Films shuttered. The new unit was founded by Clint Culpepper and Peter Schlessel, two top executives of the Columbia TriStar Motion Picture Group, with help from executives of Sony Pictures Classics.

The first two acquisitions to be released under the Screen Gems label were Limbo and Arlington Road, which was released in 1999. The company's next acquisition was Black and White, which was produced by Palm Pictures, which was released in 2000. In 2000, the two were promoted to executive vice presidents of the studio.

The company's first box office hit was Snatch, which Sony acquired, after a string of box office disappointments. In 2001, Cultpepper was promoted to studio president. After the shuttering of Destination Films, the company bought out the U.S. distribution rights to Slackers.

In 2002, after a series of failures, the company scored big with its first major hit, Resident Evil, which made money at the box office, and launched its first franchise. This was followed by another major hit, Underworld, which spawned sequels for another franchise. In 2004, the company released a sequel to the Columbia Pictures film Anaconda, called Anacondas: The Hunt for the Blood Orchid.

In 2005, the company first acquired the rights to the film Hostel, then later partnered with Lionsgate for North American theatrical and television rights to Hostel. The company became prominent in 2008 for its success with African American films, including its output with Rainforest Films. Later that year, Screen Gems, in partnership with Relativity Media, signed a deal to distribute Dear John, after New Line Cinema put the movie into turnaround, following its acquisition by Warner Bros. Pictures.

In 2018, Clint Cultpepper left Screen Gems as president. Steve Bersch of Sony Pictures Worldwide Acquisitions succeeded him as president. Under Bersch's leadership, the company launched its short form horror label, Scream Gems. In 2023, Bersch was succeeded as president by Ashley Brucks. Under her leadership, the company inked first look deals in 2024 with director Scott Derrickson and writer C. Robert Cargill, and producer Andrew Form.
