= Sandra Gould =

American actress and writer (1916-1999)

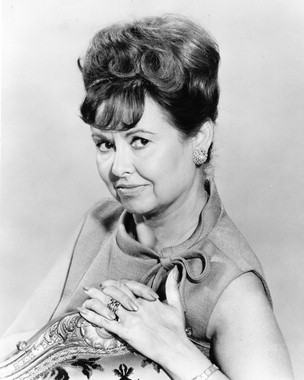
- Gould in Bewitched in 1966
- Born: July 23, 1916; New York City, U.S.
- Died: July 20, 1999 (aged 82); Burbank, California, U.S.
- Occupations: Actress, writer
- Years active: 1935–1999
- Spouses: Larry Berns (1938–1965; his death) 1 child; Hollingsworth Morse (19??–1988; his death)
- Children: One

Sandra Gould (July 23, 1916 – July 20, 1999) was an American actress, known for her role as Gladys Kravitz on the sitcom Bewitched. Gould was the second actress to portray the role, debuting at the start of the third season.

== Life and career ==
Gould was born in Brooklyn, New York. She began acting in films with an uncredited role in T-Men (1947), and was the Phone Operator in Romance on the High Seas (1948), Doris Day's debut film. She appeared in several uncredited roles for the remainder of the decade, and received her first screen credit with The Story of Molly X (1949). During the same decade, Gould enjoyed a four-year run as Miss Duffy, the man-hungry daughter of the forever-unheard owner of radio's Duffy's Tavern.

In 1953, Gould appeared as a guest in an episode of Letter to Loretta with Loretta Young. In 1959 she played a secretary in the Academy Award-nominated Imitation of Life with Lana Turner and Juanita Moore. She continued to guest star in the 1950s and 1960s in such television series as I Love Lucy, I Married Joan, December Bride, Maverick, The Flintstones, The Twilight Zone, The Lucy Show, Burke's Law, I Dream of Jeannie; Love, American Style; Gilligan's Island, The Brady Bunch and Mister Ed. She played a prominent supporting role in the film The Ghost and Mr. Chicken in 1966. In 1963, Gould released a comedy single record entitled "Hello Melvin (This Is Mama)" as an answer to Allan Sherman's hit "Hello Muddah, Hello Fadduh".

In September 1966, Gould replaced her friend Alice Pearce, who had been battling ovarian cancer during the second season of the ABC-TV situation comedy Bewitched, and had died in March. The producers were undecided about what to do with the character of Gladys, so at first they had actress Mary Grace Canfield brought in to play Harriet Kravitz, Abner's sister, who was visiting him while his wife was visiting her mother. Soon after, Sandra Gould got the role of Mrs. Kravitz when actress-comedian Alice Ghostley turned down the role.

In the role of Gladys, Gould's over-the-top performance and shrill voice were popular with viewers, and she succeeded ultimately in making the character her own. She remained with the series through its seventh season. The Kravitzes were referenced once in the final/eighth season (ep 241 "Three Men and a Witch on a Horse") but the characters did not appear. After Bewitched was cancelled in 1972, Gould reprised the role of Gladys five years later in a spin-off of the series, Tabitha. Gould also made appearances on Columbo, The Brady Bunch, Adam-12, Punky Brewster, Friends, and Veronica's Closet.

In 1960, Gould wrote the book Always Say Maybe, "a modern girl's guide to almost everything—but mostly men", published by Golden Press.

== Personal life ==
Twice married, Gould was the widow of broadcasting executive Larry Berns and television/film director Hollingsworth Morse. With Berns she had one son, Michael Berns, in 1945.

== Death ==
Gould died on July 20, 1999, in Burbank, California, of a stroke following heart surgery. She was 82. Upon her death, she was cremated and her ashes returned to her son.

== Filmography ==
=== Film ===
Year	Title	Role	Notes
1942	The Gay Nineties	Gay Nineties Skit	Short
1947	T-Men	Woman	Uncredited
1948	Romance on the High Seas	Telephone Operator	Uncredited
1948	June Bride	Towne's Secretary	Uncredited
1949	City Across the River	Shirley	Uncredited
1949	My Dream Is Yours	Mildred	Uncredited
1949	Take One False Step	Newspaper Girl	Uncredited
1949	It Happens Every Spring	Mabel on Telephone	Voice, Uncredited
1949	The Girl from Jones Beach	Sylvia	Uncredited
1949	It's a Great Feeling	Train Passenger in Upper	Uncredited
1949	The Story of Molly X	Vera	
1950	Joe Palooka Meets Humphrey	Laurine	
1951	Fourteen Hours	Hotel Switchboard Operator	Uncredited
1951	Excuse My Dust	Bit Part	Uncredited
1951	Rhubarb	Housewife Bettor	Uncredited
1952	The First Time	Telephone Operator	Uncredited
1952	No Holds Barred	Mildred	
1953	The Clown	Bunny - Daylor's Secretary	Uncredited
1953	Easy to Love	Ben's Wife	Uncredited
1956	The Great American Pastime	Gabby Neighbor	Uncredited
1957	Beau James	Secretary	Uncredited
1958	Teacher's Pet	Tess	Uncredited
1959	Imitation of Life	Annette	
1959	Blue Denim	Girl with Orchid	Uncredited
1962	Boys' Night Out	Miss Plotnik - George's Secretary	Uncredited
1964	Honeymoon Hotel	Mabel - Switchboard Operator	
1964	Dear Heart	Mrs. Sloan	
1966	The Ghost and Mr. Chicken	Loretta Pine	
1970	Airport	Millie Miles - Passenger	Uncredited
1971	The Barefoot Executive	Mrs. Wilbanks	
1973	Heterosexualis		
1975	Whiffs	Cashier	Uncredited
1977	Chatterbox	Mrs. Bugatowski	
1979	Skatetown USA	Mrs. Thorndike	
1992	Deep Cover	Mrs. G.	
1992	The Nutt House	Ma Belle	

=== Television ===
Year	Title	Role	Notes
1949	Arch Oboler's Comedy Theatre		Season 1 Episode 5: "Mr. Dydee"
1952	Chevron Theatre		Episode: "Dear Little Fool"
1952	Hollywood Opening Night		Season 2 Episode 8: "The Singing Years"
1952	The Files of Jeffrey Jones	Barfly	Episode: "Tag, You're It!"
1952–1955	I Married Joan	Mrs. MacGruder / Bernard's Mother (uncredited) / League Member (uncredited) / Elsie / Geraldine / Mildred Webster	12 episodes
1953–1958	Letter to Loretta	Milly	2 episodes
1953–1961	The Jack Benny Program	Gloria / Zelda	4 episodes
1953–1965	The Red Skelton Show	Mrs. Lump Lump / Hortense - Clara's Sister / Mrs. Gertrude Cavendish	3 episodes
1954	The Pride of the Family	Cynthia	Season 1 Episode 34: "Albie's Discipline Campaign"
1954	The Pepsi-Cola Playhouse	Piggy Harvey	Season 1 Episode 40: "Dear Little Fool"
1954	Red Skelton Revue	Mrs. Appleby	Season 1 Episode 8: "The Tooth, the Whole Tooth, and Nothing But the Tooth"
1954–1957	I Love Lucy	Nancy Johnson / Train Passenger (uncredited)	2 episodes
1955	Damon Runyon Theater		Season 2 Episode 4: "A Star Lights Up"
1955–1956	Our Miss Brooks	Nurse Dooley (uncredited) / Grace Lansing	2 episodes
1955–1956	Lux Video Theatre	Nurse / Miss Mayo	2 episodes
1956	Man Against Crime	Waitress	Season 1 Episode 2: "Badger Game"
1956	Ethel Barrymore Theatre		Season 1 Episode 14: "Winter and Spring"
1956–1957	December Bride	Frieda Manheim	3 episodes
1957	The People's Choice	Switchboard Operator	Season 2 Episode 16: "Sock's Master Plan"
1957–1958	Make Room for Daddy	Doris / Nurse	2 episodes
1958	The Thin Man	Secretary	Season 1 Episode 15: "Asta Day"
1958	Meet McGraw	Millie	Season 1 Episode 39: "The Lie That Came True"
1959	Maverick	Lucy	Season 2 Episode 18: "The Rivals"
1960	Peter Loves Mary	Mrs. Stanton	Season 1 Episode 5: "Life with Father-In-Law"
1961	Westinghouse Playhouse	Sandy	Season 1 Episode 17: "Sweet Charity"
1961	Pete and Gladys	Mother	Season 1 Episode 34: "The Mannequin Story"
1961	Hawaiian Eye	Mrs. Gibbs	Season 3 Episode 4: "The Doctor's Lady"
1961	Hokey Wolf	Juliet (voice)	Season 2 Episode 10: "Phony-O and Juliet"
1961	The Flintstones	Mrs. Gypsum / Bruce / Kid (uncredited) / Dagmar (voice, uncredited) / Daisy Killgranite (voice)	3 episodes
1961	87th Precinct	Mrs. Stradling	Season 1 Episode 8: "The Guilt"
1962	The New Breed	Winnie	Season 1 Episode 25: "The Deadlier Sex"
1962	Room for One More	Mrs. Jason	Season 1 Episode 16: "What Is It?"
1962	Ensign O'Toole	Waitress	Season 1 Episode 5: "Operation: Jinx"
1962	The Lucy Show	Bank Secretary	Season 1 Episode 4: "Lucy Misplaces $2,000"
1962	Wagon Train	Edith	Season 6 Episode 14: "The Donna Fuller Story"
1962–1964	The Twilight Zone	Woman No. 1 / Woman	2 episodes
1963	The Joey Bishop Show	Fainting Woman	Season 3 Episode 1: "The Baby's First Day"
1963–1964	My Three Sons	Mrs. Fletcher / Receptionist	2 episodes
1964	McHale's Navy	The 1st Nurse	Season 2 Episode 25: "The Novocain Mutiny"
1964	Burke's Law	Mabel	Season 1 Episode 30: "Who Killed the Eleventh Best Dressed Woman in the World?"
1964	The Alfred Hitchcock Hour	Park Commission Secretary	Season 2 Episode 26: "Ten Minutes from Now"
1964	The Bill Dana Show	Winnie the Hotel Maid	2 episodes
1965	Dr. Kildare	Mrs. Gentry	Season 4 Episode 16: "Take Care of My Little Girl"
1965	The Cara Williams Show	Miss Landers	Season 1 Episode 24: "Variety Is the Spice of Wife"
1965	Mister Ed	Gertrude	Season 6 Episode 6: "Anybody Got a Zebra?"
1965	I Dream of Jeannie	Mrs. Flaherty	Season 1 Episode 6: "The Yacht Murder Case"
1966	Gilligan's Island	Telephone Operator (uncredited)	Season 2 Episode 17: "You've Been Disconnected"
1966	The Farmer's Daughter		Season 3 Episode 30: "Half an Anniversary"
1966–1971	Bewitched	Gladys Kravitz	29 episodes (Recurring role)
1967	I Spy	Diane	Season 3 Episode 2: "The Beautiful Children"
1969	The Name of the Game	Bonnie	Season 2 Episode 7: "Give Till It Hurts"
1969–1973	Love, American Style	Ethel / Gladys August / Cora Ashton / Ethel	4 episodes
1971	Make Room for Granddaddy	Molly	Season 1 Episode 20: "Karate Kate"
1971	Columbo	Matron	Season 1 Episode 4: "Suitable for Framing"
1971	The Partners	Mrs. Kipner	Season 1 Episode 10: "Have I Got an Apartment for You!"
1971–1975	Marcus Welby, M.D.	Rose Shapiro / Long Distance Operator	2 episodes
1972	Sarge	Mrs. Hauser	Season 1 Episode 13: "An Accident Waiting to Happen"
1972	Ironside	Stella	Season 5 Episode 24: "A Man Named Arno"
1972	Adam-12	Woman	Season 5 Episode 10: "The Chaser"
1973	Emergency!	Lady at Community Center (uncredited)	Season 2 Episode 13: "Drivers"
1973	Wait Till Your Father Gets Home	(voice)	Season 1 Episode 24: "The Neighbors"
1973	Insight	Abby Bonneau	Season 1 Episode 363: "The Coming of the Clone"
1973	The Brady Bunch	Mrs. Gould	Season 5 Episode 6: "Getting Greg's Goat"
1973	The Little People	Sue	Season 2 Episode 12: "Doctor Take Five"
1975	Kolchak: The Night Stalker	Landlady	Season 1 Episode 13: "Primal Scream"
1976	Good Heavens	Lady	Season 1 Episode 2: "Take Me Out to the Ball Game"
1976	Big John, Little John	Mrs. Kimberly	Season 1 Episode 3: "Very Little John"
1976	Arthur Hailey's the Moneychangers	Chicken Lady	Miniseries; Episode 1: "Part 1"
1977	Tabitha	Gladys Kravitz	Season 1 Episode 7: "Arrival of Nancy"
1983	The Kid with the 200 I.Q.	Bus Passenger No. 1	TV Movie
1985	All Star Rock 'n' Wrestling Saturday Spectacular	Faye Flamboyant	TV Movie
1985	Crazy Like a Fox		Season 2 Episode 7: "Some Day My Prints Will Come"
1985	Still the Beaver	Dorothy	Season 1 Episode 25: "A Boy and His Snake"
1988	Punky Brewster	Mrs. Yurtzoff	Season 4 Episode 8: "Cosmetic Scam"
1990	Gravedale High	Miss Webner (voice)	2 episodes
1990	MacGyver	Soup Patron	Season 6 Episode 7: "Harry's Will"
1996	Friends	Old Woman (voice)	Season 3 Episode 10: "The One Where Rachel Quits"
1999	Veronica's Closet	Mrs. Riley	Season 2 Episode 11: "Veronica's from Venus/Josh's Parents Are from Mars"
1999	Boy Meets World	Little Old Lady	Season 6 Episode 19: "Bee True"

== Bibliography ==
- Gould, Sandra (1960). Sexpots and Pans. Golden Press.
- Gould, Sandra; Taylor, Richard (2007). Always Say Maybe: A Modern Girl's Guide To Almost Everything, But Mostly Men. Kessinger Publishing. ISBN 978-0548388617.
