= Shannon (1961 TV series) =

- Genre: Crime drama
- Created by: John Hawkins
- Directed by: Fred Jackman, Jr.
- Starring: George Nader; Regis Toomey; Jan Arvan
- Composers: Emil Cadkin; Arthur Morton
- Country of origin: United States
- Original language: English
- No. of seasons: 1
- No. of episodes: 36

Production
- Executive producer: Robert Sparks
- Producer: Jerry Briskin
- Camera setup: Single-camera
- Running time: 22–24 minutes
- Production companies: Columbia Pictures; Screen Gems Television

Original release
- Network: Syndication
- Release: October 2, 1961 – May 2, 1962

Shannon is an American crime drama series created by John Hawkins that aired in first-run syndication from October 2, 1961, to May 2, 1962. The series starred George Nader as insurance investigator Joe Shannon.

== Plot ==
Joe Shannon (George Nader) is an insurance investigator in Los Angeles for the Denver-based Transport Bonding and Surety Company. Shannon investigates losses of items in transit that are insured under the company, the losses of which are often tied to crime. He reports to his Denver-based boss Bill Cochran (Regis Toomey), and sometimes involves Los Angeles branch manager Elliot Mills (Jan Arvan).

While the series is typical for the early 1960s detective series, it is also unique in that Shannon heavily utilizes his 1961 Buick Special equipped with advanced gadgetry for the period. The car has its own phone and a dictation machine for his notes. Shannon often uses a personal recording device hidden in his jacket while questioning suspects.

== Cast ==
- George Nader as Joseph "Joe" Shannon
- Regis Toomey as Bill Cochran
- Jan Arvan as Elliot Mills

=== Guest stars ===
- Chris Alcaide as Jack O'Hare in "Duke of the Valley"
- King Calder as John Millard in "The Sports Car Story"
- Francis De Sales as Ray Petri in "Cold Trail"
- Jerry Douglas as Larry Engstrom in "The Florentine Prince"
- Robert Duvall as Joey Nolan in "The Big Fish"
- Paul Fix as Royer in "Desert Crossing"
- Harold Gould as Jess Dowling in "Ironclad Alibi"
- Raymond Guth as Bill Winter in "End of the Line"
- DeForest Kelley as Carlyle in "The Pickup"
- Ann McCrea as Phyllis Gray in "Never Help a Lady" (1962)
- Joseph Mell as Papa Brogano in "The Big Fish"
- Lee Meriwether as Evelyn Hoxy in "Bonds of Friendship"
- Candy Moore as Donna Humphrey in "The Embezzler's Daughter"
- Gilman Rankin as Dave Barker in "Ironclad Alibi"
- Stephen Roberts as Jenkins in "The Deadly Homecoming"
- Mickey Sholdar as Shad in "Desert Crossing"
- Hal Smith as Artie Shawn in "The King Leal Report"
- John Zaremba as Lloyd Garvin in "The Zendee Report"

== Production ==
As the Network era began in the late 1950s, first-run syndication programming began faltering. By this time, film studios such as Columbia (which owned Screen Gems) had begun to recognize more value in creating series for the broadcast networks as opposed to the first-run market, the reach of which were often relegated to only larger cities. The three major networks - ABC, CBS, and NBC - increased broadcast time, with audiences preferring the higher quality of their programming over the lower-budgeted fare of syndication programming. This was compounded by increasing production costs, which were limited by the larger viewership base and finances associated with the networks.

The series was created by John Hawkins (who often co-wrote with his brother Ward Hawkins) for Screen Gems Television. Jerry Briskin served as producer. Gene Roddenberry wrote two of the teleplays while under contract to Screen Gems. Screen Gems formally announced the series on June 2, 1961.

As opposed to the then-usual schedule of three-day shoots for one episode per week, Shannon utilized a six-day shoot for three episodes per week. This schedule plus on-location shoots lowered costs for the series. Most notably, co-star Regis Toomey wore a hat to avoid time needed for makeup on his bald head. By September 18, the series had completed its first thirteen episodes.

Although it only produced one season of 36 episodes, Shannon experienced some success. It was sold to 87 markets within its first two months, which had expanded to 109 markets by February 1962. In 1963, it was the top-rated syndicated series in Detroit.

== Episodes ==
No.	Title	Written by	Original release date	Prod. code
1	"The Embezzler's Daughter"	Story by : Ward Hawkins; Teleplay by : Gene Roddenberry	October 2, 1961	102
2	"Ironclad Alibi"	John O'Dea	October 3, 1961	104
3	"The King Leal Report"	Norman S. Hall	October 4, 1961	103
4	"Decoy"	Unknown	October 4, 1961	105
5	"The Zendee Report"	John Hawkins	October 5, 1961	101
6	"The Jade Tortoise"	Jesse L. Lasky, Jr. & Pat Silver	October 11, 1961	107
7	"Desert Crossroads"	Don Ingalls	October 18, 1961	109
8	"The Big Fish"	Don Ingalls	October 31, 1961	110
9	"The Porcelain Egg"	Charles B. Smith	November 1, 1961	106
10	"The Pickup"	Gene Roddenberry	November 20, 1961	108
11	"Lady on the Rocks"	Paul Schneider	November 21, 1961	111
12	"Duke of the Valley"	David Chandler	November 23, 1961	113
13	"Cold Trail"	John Hawkins	November 25, 1961	112
14	"The Hyatt Fund"	Story by : Milt Rosen; Teleplay by : John Hawkins	November 30, 1961	114
15	"The Professional Widower"	Story by : Seymour Friedman; Teleplay by : Todhunter Ballard	December 13, 1961	115
16	"Legacy in G"	Charles B. Smith	December 18, 1961	116
17	"Fallers"	Story by : George Fass & Gertrude Fass; Teleplay by : Todhunter Ballard	January 2, 1962	117
18	"Dolphin and the Mermaid"	Paul Schneider	January 9, 1962	118
19	"The Man from Yesterday"	Don Ignalls	January 31, 1962	120
20	"The Jungle Kid"	John Hawkins	February 1, 1962	122
21	"Bonds of Friendship"	Philip Saltzman	February 5, 1962	119
22	"Tarnish on the Badge"	Norman S. Hall	February 7, 1962	121
23	"The Deadly Homecoming"	Joseph Vogel & Lou Lantz	February 9, 1962	123
24	"Saints and Sinners"	Jack Jacobs	February 16, 1962	124
25	"The Patriarch"	Story by : Herb Purdom; Teleplay by : Todhunter Ballard	March 14, 1962	126
26	"License to Steal"	Unknown	March 19, 1962	125
27	"The Sports Car Story"	Story by : Robert Alan Miller; Teleplay by : Todhunter Ballard	March 22, 1962	127
28	"Play with Fire"	Unknown	March 28, 1962	130
29	"The Florentine Prince"	Unknown	April 4, 1962	128
30	"Delayed Delivery"	Story by : Seymour Friedman; Teleplay by : Todhunter Ballard	April 4, 1962	132
31	"The Gideon Leap"	Don Ignalls	April 5, 1962	129
32	"Never Help a Lady"	Steven Ritch	April 6, 1962	131
33	"Uneasy Debt"	John Hawkins	April 11, 1962	133
34	"End of the Line"	John Hawkins	April 25, 1962	135
35	"The Medal"	Don Ignalls	April 27, 1962	134
36	"Conspiracy of Silence"	Don Ignalls	May 2, 1962	136
