= Jerry Davis (screenwriter) =

American director, producer and screenwriter

- Born: Jerome L. Davis; September 26, 1917; New York, U.S.
- Died: April 11, 1991 (aged 73); Los Angeles, California, U.S.
- Occupations: Director, producer, screenwriter
- Spouse: Marilyn Maxwell (m. 1954; div. 1960)
- Children: 4

Jerome L. Davis (September 26, 1917 – April 11, 1991) was an American director, producer and screenwriter. He was nominated for five Primetime Emmy Awards in the categories Outstanding Writing, Outstanding Comedy Series and Outstanding New Series for his work on the television programs The Farmer's Daughter, Bewitched and The Odd Couple. Davis died in April 1991 of a stroke at the Cedars-Sinai Medical Center in Los Angeles, California.
