= Mickey Sholdar =

American actor (born 1949)

Mickey Sholdar (born March 20, 1949, in Indianapolis, Indiana) is an American actor.

Sholdar's credits include the role of Eddie Stander, with Ed Asner in Alfred Hitchcock Presents episode "To Catch a Butterfly"; also as son “Tommy Bassop” in a 1964 Gunsmoke episode titled "The Bassops", and a regular role as Steven Morley in the TV series The Farmer's Daughter (1963–66), and several appearances in Dragnet 1967.

He was also the golf technical advisor for the 1975 film Babe, the life story of Babe Zaharias, and appeared on-screen as a golf pro. This was his last film or TV part to date.

Another credit was on Route 66, appearing in the eleventh episode of season 3 entitled "Hey, Moth, Come Eat the Flame", which aired on November 30, 1962. In the episode, Sholdar plays a young boy trying to cope with the alcoholism of his piano-playing widower father (Harry Guardino) who was also being tempted into participating in a payroll heist. Sholdar had a year earlier played the son of a widower father who committed a truck heist in the Shannon episode "Desert Crossroads."

== Selected filmography ==
- The Alfred Hitchcock Hour (1963 Season 1 Episode 19: "To Catch a Butterfly") as Eddie Stander
- Bonanza (October 6, 1963 episode "Rain from Heaven") as Jube Weems

== Bibliography ==
- Goldrup, Tom and Jim (2002). Growing Up on the Set: Interviews with 39 Former Child Actors of Film and Television. McFarland & Co. pp. 269–276. ISBN 1476613702.
