= Ashmont Productions =

American TV production company

- Type: Production company
- Industry: Television
- Founded: 1965; 61 years ago
- Founders: William Asher; Elizabeth Montgomery
- Defunct: 1976; 50 years ago
- Headquarters: Los Angeles, California

Ashmont Productions was an American television production company. The company was founded by William Asher and his then wife Elizabeth Montgomery initially as a production company for the television series Bewitched.

The production company also became a production venue for several other ABC shows until the studio's close in 1976.

== History ==
Ashmont Productions was formed in 1965 by director William Asher and his then-wife, actress Elizabeth Montgomery. Montgomery was the star of ABC's Bewitched and husband Asher directed it. The production company's original purpose was exclusively as a production outlet for Bewitched. The name "Ashmont" was a combination of the first syllables of Asher's and Montgomery's names. The combination of the couple's names was very similar to rival Desilu Productions, formed by Desi Arnaz and Lucille Ball.

However, in 1965, the company only had one production credit on a season 1 episode of Bewitched. The company did not become active again until the start of the eighth and final season of the show in 1971. After Bewitched, Ashmont produced The Paul Lynde Show and Temperatures Rising. The production company closed its doors in 1976 after the filming of the original pilot for the television series Tabitha.

== Programs ==
Year	Title	Notes	References
1965; 1971-1972	Bewitched	26 episodes	
1972–1974	Temperatures Rising	Produced all 46 episodes Also known as The New Temperatures Rising Show	
1972–1973	The Paul Lynde Show	Produced all 26 episodes	
1976	Tabitha	Original 1976 pilot episode only	
