= William Froug =

American screenwriter (1922–2013)

- Born: May 26, 1922; Brooklyn, New York, U.S.
- Died: August 25, 2013 (aged 91); Sarasota, Florida, U.S.
- Occupations: Radio writer-producer, Television writer-producer, author, professor
- Known for: The Twilight Zone; Gilligan's Island; Bewitched
- Military career
- Allegiance: United States
- Branch: United States Navy
- Service years: 1943–1946
- Rank: LTJG

William Froug (May 26, 1922 – August 25, 2013) was an American television writer and producer. His producing credits included the series The Twilight Zone, Gilligan's Island, and Bewitched. He was a writer for, among other shows, The Dick Powell Show, Charlie's Angels, and Adventures in Paradise. He authored numerous books on screenwriting, including Screenwriting Tricks of the Trade, Zen and the Art of Screenwriting I and II, The Screenwriter Looks at The Screenwriter, and How I Escaped from Gilligan's Island: Adventures of a Hollywood Writer-Producer, published in 2005 by the University of Wisconsin Press.

One of Froug's students, actor and screenwriter Dan O'Bannon, included a reference to Froug in the 1974 film Dark Star. O'Bannon's character, Sergeant Pinback, claims that his real name is "Bill Froug".

== Early life ==
William Froug was born in Brooklyn, New York in 1922 and placed for adoption through the Louise Wise agency there. Soon after, he was adopted by William Froug (1887–1967) and Carita "Rita" Froug (née Wolfe, 1899–1982) of Little Rock, Arkansas, where he spent his childhood before the family moved to Tulsa, Oklahoma (Froug's Department Stores). He graduated from Little Rock Senior High School in 1939. The family home of Froug's grandfather, Abraham Froug, has been preserved as a historic home and is located adjacent to the Governor's Mansion in the Little Rock Historic District.

Froug attended and graduated from the renowned Missouri School of Journalism at the University of Missouri in 1943 before enlisting in the U.S. Navy. He was selected for the V-7 Navy College Training Program at Columbia University and graduated as one of the "90 Day Wonders".

He served as an officer aboard a subchaser stationed at Pearl Harbor before taking command of his own ship, USS PC800, in 1945 at Eniwetok Atoll.

== Writing career ==
After his honorable discharge in 1946, he set to work on his passion and gift for writing. He sold his first novella to True Detective Magazine in 1946. He then moved into radio writing and was Vice President of Programs at CBS Radio Hollywood by 1956.

Among his radio work, Froug produced, directed, and adapted for CBS Radio, Aldous Huxley's Brave New World, which is listed as one of the 50 greatest radio programs of the 20th century. He transitioned into television adapting one of his radio scripts into an episode of The Jane Wyman Show in 1955. In the 1958–59 awards period he won both an Emmy and a Producer of the Year award for the Alcoa-Goodyear Theatre production of Eddie. He was also nominated for the Producer of the Year award by the Producers Guild of America for his work on Mr. Novak, Playhouse 90 and The Twilight Zone.

As a writer-producer he went on to write numerous optioned screenplays, one of which was bought by 3 different studios, and wrote and/or produced for such iconic television series as Adventures in Paradise, The Twilight Zone, Bewitched and Gilligan's Island. James Michener sent him a telegram congratulating him on the script he wrote for Adventures in Paradise, "Angel of Death," calling it, "A real achievement."

His shows were called must-see TV for millions of viewers and fans. He wrote more than 200 scripts for other series' such as Bonanza, Quincy M.E., Paper Chase and Charlie's Angels, among other top shows. The pilot for which he served as a producer, Adam's Rib, was accepted into the permanent collection of the Museum of Broadcasting in New York.

Froug was nominated for another Emmy as producer on Bewitched, became executive producer in charge of drama at CBS, and began lecturing at USC's film school before leaving for UCLA as an adjunct professor. He authored numerous books on screenwriters and screenwriting and continued in leadership positions with the Writers Guild of America West and Producers Guild of America. In 1987 Froug was honored with the prestigious Valentine Davies Award from the Writers Guild of America, West.

== Teaching ==
As a tenured professor at UCLA, he revamped the screenwriting program and taught select graduate level courses. In a 1976 interview for the Los Angeles Times, Froug was quoted as saying. "I often tell my students at the first class that if one of them ever sells a screenplay, it will be a minor miracle".

By that time, he had taught more than 500 students at USC and UCLA and said he guessed that fewer than 10 percent of those students would be able to make a career in film, let alone screenwriting. Froug retired from UCLA in 1987.

As an author, Froug's books were used as textbooks in film schools around the world. In The Ultimate Writer's Guide to Hollywood, author Skip Press describes Froug's Screenwriting Tricks of the Trade as "one of the best screenwriting books I've ever read" and listed the book in his Top 10 Hollywood Reads.

In 2011, Froug was selected as one of the Emmy Legends of Television by the Archive of American Television. His interview is available online at EmmyLegends.org

The UCLA Film and Television Archives hold many of his scripts, interviews and legacy items. The UCSB Special Collection Library holds his extensive research documents on the "Oklahoma Run" which he used for a proposed series, El Dorado.

== Personal life ==
Froug married Betty Oppenheim in 1946.

William Froug was a political and social activist and served on the boards of both the Writers Guild of America, West and Producers Guild of America. In addition, he was a founding member of "The Caucus for Producers, Writers and Directors" for which he served as both chair and co-chair over the years. Froug died at the age of 91 in August 2013 in Sarasota, Florida.

Roger Ebert once wrote of Froug, "I know an old writer. His name is William Froug, he lives in Florida and if you look him up on Amazon, you will see he is still writing brilliant and useful books about screenwriting and teleplays. He is not merely as sharp as a tack, he is the standard by which they sharpen tacks. If he had been advising the kid [younger actor from the movie 'The Man in the Chair'], the kid would have made a better movie, and if he had been advising the director of 'The Man in the Chair,' we would have been spared the current experience. Just because you're old doesn't mean you have to be a decrepit caricature. One thing that keeps Froug young is that, unlike Flash Madden, he almost certainly does not sit on an expressway overpass guzzling Jack Daniels from a pint bottle."
