= Bewitched =

American fantasy sitcom (1964–1972)

- Genre: Fantasy; Sitcom
- Created by: Sol Saks
- Directed by: William Asher (Note: A full list of directors and writers can be seen at this link.)
- Starring: Elizabeth Montgomery; Dick York; Agnes Moorehead; Dick Sargent; David White
- Theme music composer: Howard Greenfield; Jack Keller
- Composers: Warren Barker; Allyn Ferguson; Van Alexander; Jimmie Haskell; Pete Carpenter
- Country of origin: United States
- Original language: English
- No. of seasons: 8
- No. of episodes: 254 (list of episodes)

Production
- Executive producer: Harry Ackerman
- Producers: Danny Arnold; Jerry Davis; William Froug; William Asher
- Camera setup: Single-camera
- Running time: approx. 25 minutes
- Production companies: Screen Gems; Ashmont Productions (season 8)

Original release
- Network: ABC
- Release: September 17, 1964 – March 25, 1972

Related
- Tabitha

Bewitched is an American fantasy sitcom television series that originally aired for eight seasons on ABC from September 17, 1964, to March 25, 1972. It is about a witch who marries an ordinary mortal man and vows to lead the life of a typical suburban housewife. The show was popular, finishing as the second-highest-rated show in America during its debut season, staying in the top 10 for its first three seasons, and ranking in 11th place for both seasons four and five. The show continues to be seen throughout the world in syndication and on recorded media.

Bewitched was created by Sol Saks under executive producer Harry Ackerman and starred Elizabeth Montgomery as Samantha Stephens, Dick York (1964–1969) as Darrin Stephens, and Agnes Moorehead as Endora, Samantha's mother. Dick Sargent replaced an ailing York for the final three seasons (1969–1972).

Hanna-Barbera produced the opening and closing animation credits. In 2002, Bewitched was ranked No. 50 on "TV Guide's 50 Greatest TV Shows of All Time". In 1997, the same magazine ranked the second-season episode "Divided He Falls" number 48 on its list of the 100 Greatest Episodes of All Time.

== Plot ==
A beautiful witch named Samantha (Elizabeth Montgomery) meets and marries a mortal named Darrin Stephens (Dick York, later Dick Sargent). While Samantha complies with Darrin's wishes to become a normal suburban housewife, her magical family disapproves of the mixed marriage and frequently interferes in the couple's lives. Episodes often begin with Darrin becoming the victim of a spell, the effects of which wreak havoc with other mortals such as his boss, clients, parents, and neighbors. By the epilogue, however, Darrin and Samantha most often embrace, having overcome the devious elements that failed to separate them. The witches and their male counterparts, warlocks, are very long-lived; while Samantha appears to be a young woman, many episodes suggest she is actually hundreds of years old. To keep their society secret, witches avoid showing their powers in front of mortals other than Darrin. Nevertheless, the effects of their spells—and Samantha's attempts to hide their supernatural origin from mortals—drive the plot of most episodes. Witches and warlocks usually use physical gestures along with their incantations. To perform magic, Samantha often twitches her nose to create a spell. Special visual effects are accompanied by music to highlight such an action.

== Setting ==
The main setting for most episodes is the Stephenses' home at 1164 Morning Glory Circle, in an upper-middle-class suburban neighborhood, either Westport, Connecticut, or Patterson, New York, as indicated by conflicting information presented throughout the series. Many scenes also take place at the fictional Madison Avenue advertising agency McMann and Tate, where Darrin works.

== Cast and characters ==
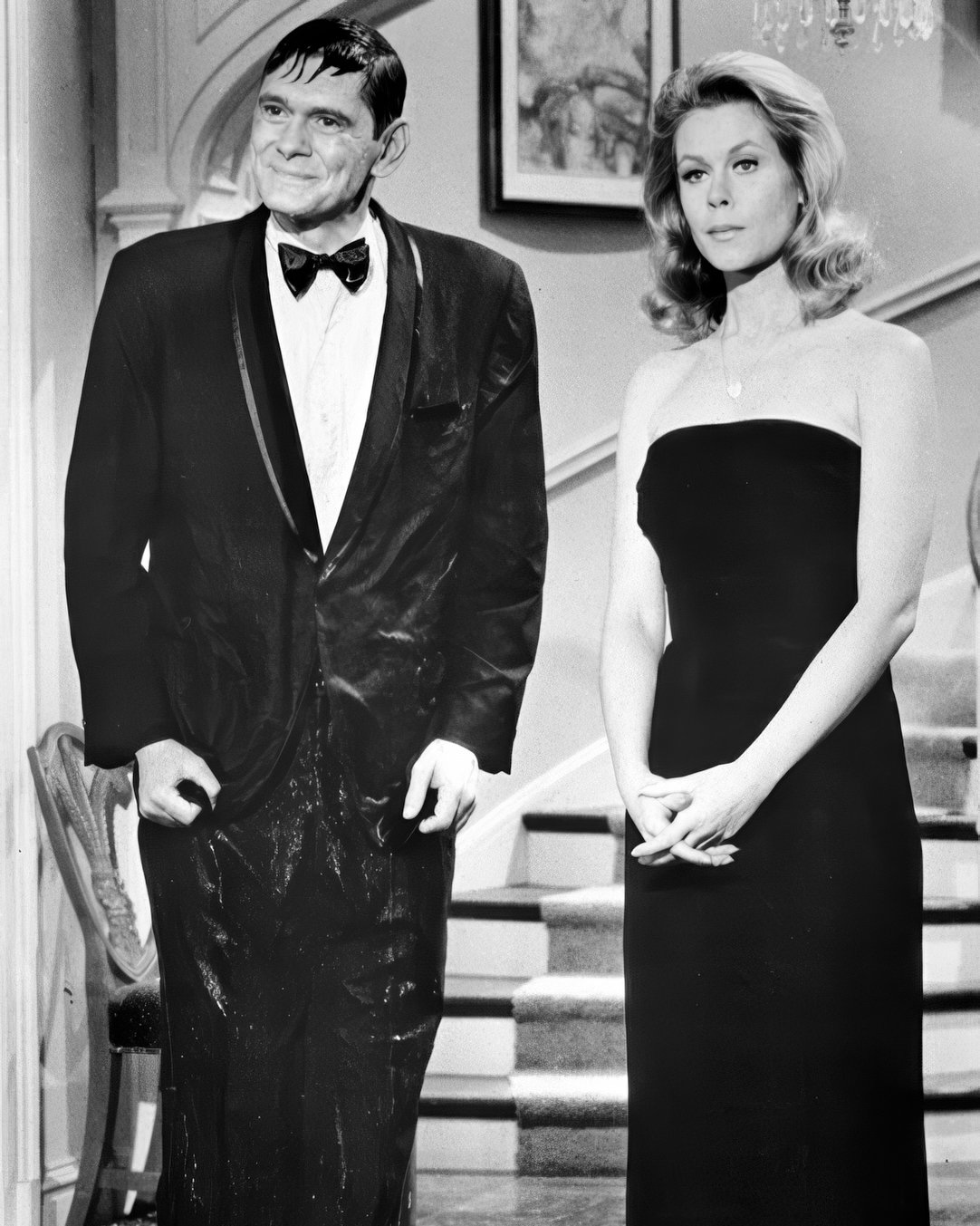
Dick York and Elizabeth Montgomery

- Elizabeth Montgomery as Samantha Stephens
- Dick York (1964–1969), then Dick Sargent (1969–1972) as Darrin Stephens, her husband (Sargent replaced an ailing York for the final three seasons)
- Agnes Moorehead as Endora, Samantha's mother
- David White as Larry Tate, Darrin's boss at the advertising agency
- Irene Vernon (1964–1966), then Kasey Rogers (1966–1972) as Louise Tate, Larry's wife
- Alice Pearce (1964–1966), then Sandra Gould (1966–1971) as Gladys Kravitz (Gould took over the part after Pearce's death)
- George Tobias (1964–1971) as her husband, Abner Kravitz
- Erin Murphy (1966–1972) as Tabitha Stephens (she shared this role for 18 episodes with her fraternal twin sister, Diane Murphy)

Annual semiregulars:

- Marion Lorne as Samantha's Aunt Clara (1964–1968);
- Maurice Evans as Maurice, Samantha's father (1964−1972);
- Mabel Albertson as Darrin's mother, Phyllis Stephens (1964–1971);
- Robert F. Simon and Roy Roberts alternating the role of Frank Stephens, Darrin's father (1964–1971);
- Paul Lynde as Samantha's Uncle Arthur (1965–1971);
- Bernard Fox as Dr. Bombay (1967–1972);
- Alice Ghostley as Esmeralda, Tabitha's babysitter (1969–1972).

During its run, the series had a number of major cast changes, often because of illness or death of the actors.

== Precursors ==
Creator Sol Saks' inspirations for this series were the film I Married a Witch (1942), developed from Thorne Smith's unfinished novel The Passionate Witch, and the John Van Druten Broadway play Bell, Book and Candle, which was adapted into the 1958 film.

In I Married a Witch, Wallace Wooley (Fredric March) is a descendant of people who executed witches at the Salem witch trials. As revenge, a witch (Veronica Lake) prepares a love potion for him. She ends up consuming her own potion and falling for her enemy. Her father is against this union. In the film Bell, Book and Candle (1958), modern witch Gillian Holroyd (Kim Novak) uses a love spell on Shep Henderson (James Stewart) to have a simple fling with him, but she genuinely falls for the man.

Both films were properties of Columbia Pictures, which also owned Screen Gems, the company that produced Bewitched.

== Production and broadcasting ==
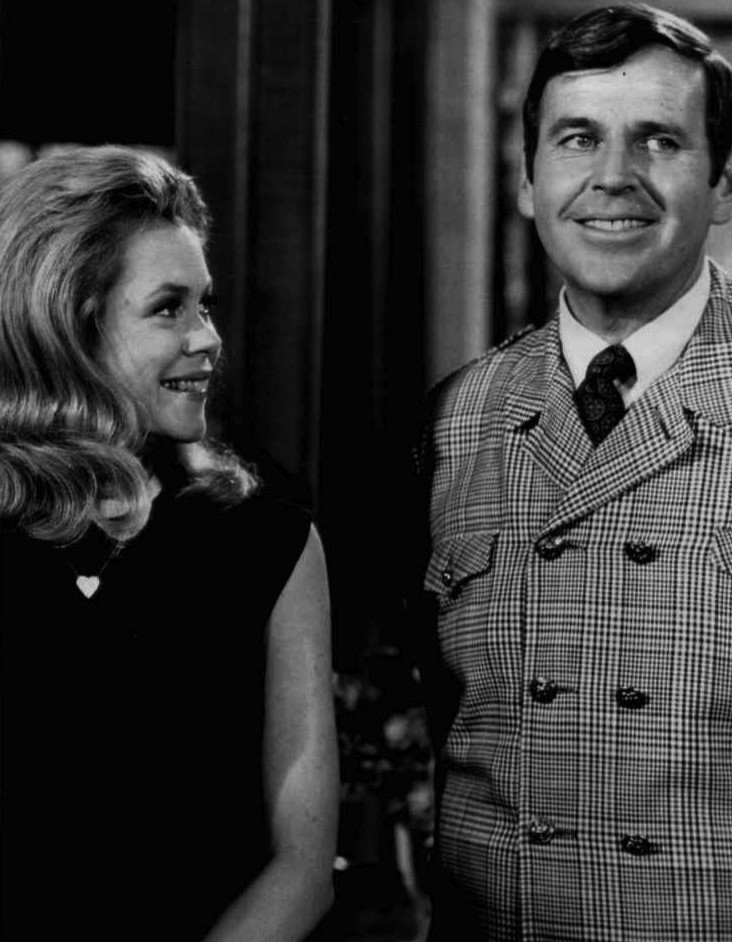
Elizabeth Montgomery and Paul Lynde as Uncle Arthur (1968)

Sol Saks received credit as the creator of the show; he wrote the pilot of Bewitched, but was not involved with the show after the pilot. Creator Saks, executive producer Harry Ackerman, and director William Asher started rehearsals for the pilot on November 22, 1963; this coincided with the assassination of John F. Kennedy and the swearing in of Lyndon Johnson. Asher felt personally affected by the event, as he knew Kennedy; he had produced the 1962 televised birthday party where Marilyn Monroe sang "Happy Birthday, Mr. President". The pilot concerned "the occult destabilization of the conformist life of an upwardly mobile advertising man". For that first episode, "I Darrin, Take This Witch, Samantha", Academy Award-winning actor José Ferrer served as the narrator. First-season producer and head writer Danny Arnold set the initial style and tone of the series, and he also helped to develop supporting characters such as Larry Tate and the Kravitzes. Arnold, who wrote for McHale's Navy and other shows, thought of Bewitched essentially as a romantic comedy about a mixed marriage; his episodes kept the magic element to a minimum. One or two magical acts drove the plot, but Samantha often solved problems without magic. Many of the first season's episodes were allegorical, using supernatural situations as metaphors for the problems any young couple would face. Though the show was a hit right from the beginning, finishing its first year as the number-two show in the United States, ABC wanted more magic and more farcical plots, which caused battles between Arnold and the network.

In its first season, Bewitched was the ABC's number-one show and the best-rated sitcom among all three networks, coming second in ratings only to Bonanza. Bewitched aired at 9 p.m. Thursday evenings. It was preceded on the air by another sitcom, My Three Sons, and followed by the soap opera Peyton Place. My Three Sons finished 13th in the ratings and Peyton Place ninth. The block formed by the three shows was the strongest ratings grabber in ABC's schedule. Arnold left the show after the first season, leaving producing duties to Jerry Davis, who had already produced some of the first season's episodes (though Arnold was still supervising the writing). The second season was produced by Davis, and with Bernard Slade as head writer, misunderstandings and farce became more prevalent elements, though this season still included a number of more low-key episodes in which the magical element was not strongly emphasized. With the third season and the switch to color, Davis left the show and was replaced as producer by William Froug. Slade also left after the second season. According to William Froug's autobiography, William Asher (who had directed many episodes) wanted to take over as producer when Jerry Davis left, but the production company was not yet ready to approve the idea. Froug, a former producer of Gilligan's Island and the last season of The Twilight Zone, was brought in as a compromise. By his own admission, Froug was not very familiar with Bewitched and found himself in the uncomfortable position of being the official producer, though Asher was making most of the creative decisions. After a year, Froug left the show, and Asher took over as full-time producer of the series for the rest of its run. The first two seasons had aired Thursdays at 9:00, and the time was moved to 8:30 shortly after the third year (1966–1967) had begun. Nevertheless, the ratings for Bewitched remained high and it placed among the top 15 shows through the 1968–69 season. It was the seventh-highest-rated show in the U.S. for 1965–66 and 1966–67. Similarly, it was number 11 the following two years.

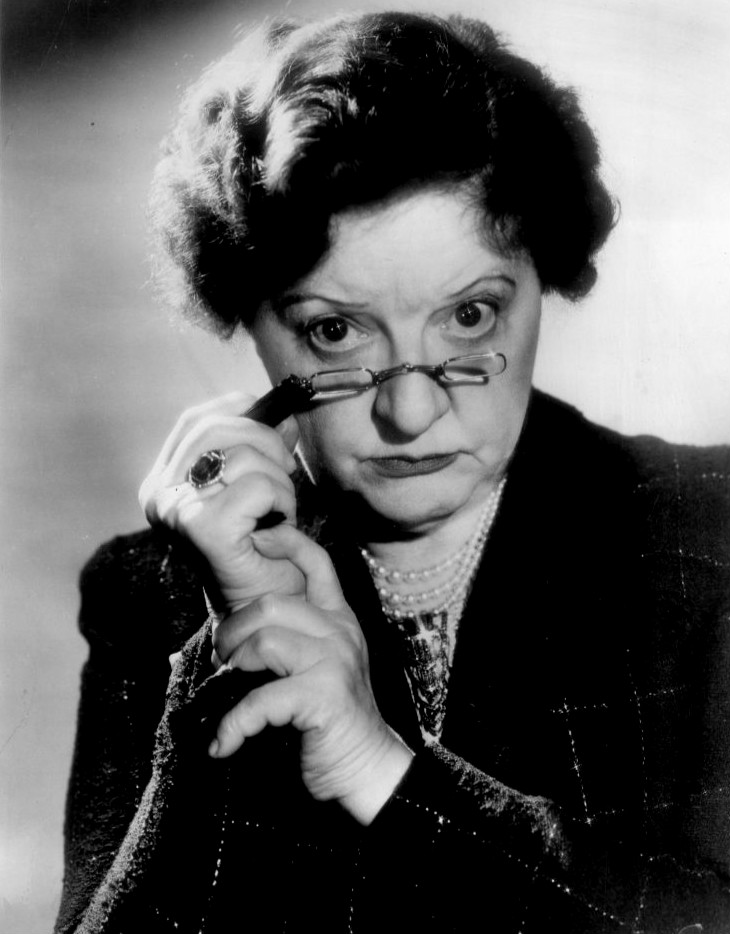
Marion Lorne, shown here as Myrtle Banford from the television program Sally, played Samantha's bumbling Aunt Clara.

At the time, the show had won three Emmy Awards. William Asher won the Primetime Emmy Award for Outstanding Directing for a Comedy Series in 1966. Alice Pearce posthumously won the Primetime Emmy Award for Outstanding Supporting Actress in a Comedy Series for her portrayal of Gladys Kravitz, and Marion Lorne won the same award posthumously in 1968 for her portrayal of Aunt Clara. Producers were faced with how to deal with the deaths of both these actresses. When Pearce died in early 1966, Mary Grace Canfield was hired to play Gladys's sister-in-law Harriet Kravitz in four episodes. Comedienne Alice Ghostley was approached to take over the role of Gladys the next season, but turned it down. Pearce and she were good friends, so Ghostley decided to decline the role out of respect for Pearce. In the fall of 1966, Sandra Gould was hired as Gladys Kravitz. Gould remained with the show until the spring of 1971. After Marion Lorne's death in the spring of 1968, she was not replaced, and the character of Aunt Clara was not seen after the fourth season. Beginning in the show's sixth year, Alice Ghostley was finally used to play the character of Esmeralda, a kind but shy and inept witch who served as a nanny and nursemaid to Darrin and Samantha's children, Tabitha and Adam. (Ghostley had appeared in a similar role as Naomi, an incompetent domestic, hired by Darrin to do housecleaning for a pregnant Samantha in the second-season episode "Maid to Order".) In another notable casting change, Louise Tate, played by Irene Vernon during the first two seasons, was played by Kasey Rogers thereafter.

The fifth season of Bewitched (1968–1969) proved to be a turning point for the series, most notably with the midseason departure of Dick York and the record eight episodes that were filmed without him afterwards (although aired out of order with previously filmed episodes). York was suffering from recurring back problems, the result of an accident during the filming of They Came to Cordura (1959). As a result, many episodes in seasons three and four had York's character of Darrin out of town on business. Towards the end of season five, York's increased disability, which had caused numerous shooting delays and script rewrites, resulted in his collapsing on the set in January 1969 while filming the episode "Daddy Does His Thing." He was immediately rushed to the hospital, and after a long talk with producer-director William Asher, York decided to leave the series. At about the same time, Montgomery and Asher announced that they were expecting another baby, and Samantha and Darrin were to also have another child in the fall of that year. On screen, Samantha tells Darrin over the phone the news of her second pregnancy in the fifth-season episode "Samantha's Good News". That same month, Dick Sargent was cast to play Darrin beginning in the sixth season. Also during this season, Serena (Samantha's identical cousin, also played by Montgomery, but credited to Pandora Spocks in some episodes) was used more frequently. Filming of scenes involving both Samantha and Serena was accomplished by using Melody McCord, Montgomery's stand-in.

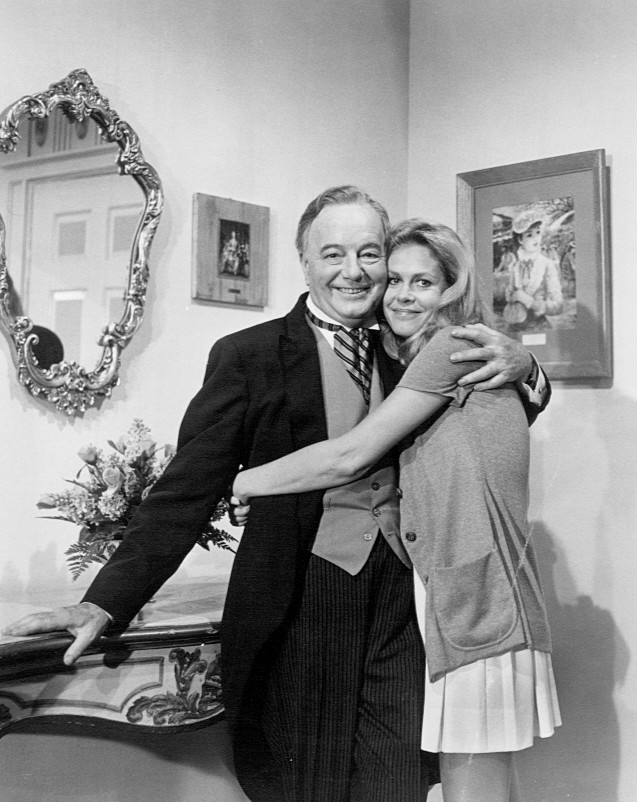
Maurice Evans as Samantha's father, with Elizabeth Montgomery (1971)

Beginning with the sixth season's (1969–1970) opening credits, in addition to York being replaced with Sargent, Elizabeth Montgomery was billed above the title, and David White now received billing, as well, after Agnes Moorehead's. During this year, the show incurred a significant decline in ratings, falling from 11th to 24th place. In mid-1970, the set of the Stephenses' home was being rebuilt due to a fire. In June, the cast and crew traveled to Salem, Magnolia, and Gloucester, Massachusetts to film an eight-part story arc in which Samantha, Darrin, and Endora travel to Salem for the centennial Witches Convocation. These location shoots marked the only times the show was filmed away from its Hollywood studio sets and backlot. Season seven premiered with eight so-called Salem Saga episodes. These on-location episodes helped the show's sagging ratings. During that year, though, scripts from old episodes were recycled frequently. By the end of the 1970–1971 season, the ratings for Bewitched had noticeably dropped and the show did not even rank in the list of the top 30 programs. ABC moved Bewitched's airtime from Thursdays at 8:30 p.m. to Wednesdays at 8:00 p.m. at the beginning of the eighth season. The schedule change did not help ratings, as the show was now pitted against CBS's popular The Carol Burnett Show and NBC's Adam-12. Fewer recurring characters were used this season; the Kravitzes, Darrin's parents, and Uncle Arthur did not appear at all, and Louise Tate only featured in three episodes. Filming ended in December 1971, and in January 1972 the show was finally moved to Saturday night at 8:00 p.m., opposite television's number-one show, All in the Family, where it fared even worse, with Bewitched finishing in 72nd place for the year.

During its first five seasons, Bewitched was sponsored by both General Motors’ Chevrolet division and the Quaker Oats Company. As a result, Chevrolet vehicles were often prominently featured on the series, even as a part of the storyline (an example of product placement), and many scenes showed the Stephenses having breakfast in the kitchen. Sponsors in later seasons included Bristol-Myers, Eastman Kodak, and Oscar Mayer.

=== Sets and locations ===
The 1959 Columbia Pictures film Gidget was filmed on location at a real house in Santa Monica (at 267 18th Street). The blueprint design of this house was later reversed and replicated as a house facade attached to an existing garage on the backlot of Columbia's Ranch. This was the house seen on Bewitched. The patio and living room sets seen in Columbia's Gidget Goes to Rome (1963) were soon adapted for the permanent Bewitched set for 1964. The interior of the Stephenses' house can be seen, substantially unaltered, in the Jerry Lewis film Hook, Line & Sinker (1969). The set was also used several times in the television series Gidget and I Dream of Jeannie, as well as the television film Brian's Song (1971). It was also used, as a setting for an opening tag sequence, for the final episode of the first season of another Screen Gems property, The Monkees, and in an episode of The Fantastic Journey. The house served as Doctor Bellows' house on I Dream of Jeannie, and was seen in an episode of Home Improvement when Tim Taylor took Tool Time on location to the house of Vinnie's mother to repair a gas leak in the basement furnace (with a second gas leak at the kitchen stove, unbeknownst to Tim). The Stephens house was also featured in a Fruit of the Loom Christmas commercial and it was used as Clark Griswold's boyhood home in his old home movies in National Lampoon's Christmas Vacation. On Marvel Studios' 2021 limited series WandaVision, which pays homage to Bewitched in a number of episodes, the house's exterior serves throughout the series as the home of neighbor Agatha Harkness, while the interior set briefly appears in one episode as the ever-evolving home of the titular characters, Wanda and Vision.

On the Columbia studio backlot, the Kravitzes' house was actually down the street from the Stephenses' house exterior. Both houses' exterior doors opened to an unfinished 18-by-15-foot (5.5 by 4.6 m) entry, as the interiors were shot on studio sound stages elsewhere. A "front porch" set, replicating the porch of the backlot house was created, as well. From 1964 through 1966, the Kravitzes' house was the same as used for The Donna Reed Show. Beginning with third-season color episodes in 1966, the Kravitz house sets were the same as what would (years later) be featured as The Partridge Family house.

Production and filming for Bewitched was based in Los Angeles, and although the setting is assumed to be suburban New York, several episodes feature wide-angle exterior views of the Stephenses' neighborhood showing a California landscape with mountains in the distance. Another example of questionable continuity regarding location can be seen in season six, episode six: Darrin's parents drive home after visiting the new baby, passing several large palm trees lining the street.

== Cancellation and aftermath ==
Despite the low ratings, Bewitched still had a contract for two more seasons on ABC. The network was willing to honor that contract by renewing the sitcom for a ninth season. Montgomery had grown tired of the series and wanted other roles. Her husband William Asher and she had separated and would divorce in 1974. Ashmont Productions, the production company for Elizabeth Montgomery and William Asher (the combination of ASHer and MONTgomery), was one of the production companies for Bewitched.

Asher pitched an idea to ABC for a sitcom starring Paul Lynde. The concept was based on the play Howie, about a lawyer, Paul Simms (played by Paul Lynde), whose daughter marries a slacker named Howard, or "Howie". Paul's character despises him, as he is not interested in earning money or traditional pursuits. In creating a series for Paul Lynde, Asher decided to resurrect the Howie concept for ABC and Screen Gems as a replacement for Bewitched the following year. Asher designed The Paul Lynde Show to be ABC's counterpart to CBS's All in the Family, but the show lacked the controversial and topical issues brought up by that series, due to ABC's restriction on social realism. This was despite Lynde's rewrite of the show's dialog to make the series more lively and comedic. When The Paul Lynde Show debuted on ABC in the fall of 1972, it inherited Bewitched's time slot during its last season on Wednesday nights opposite the first half of the top-30 hit The Carol Burnett Show on CBS and the top-20 hit Adam-12 on NBC. While the premiere episode of The Paul Lynde Show did well in the ratings, strong negative reactions not only to Lynde's character, but also the premise of the series, led to bad word of mouth and eventual cancellation of the series.

The Paul Lynde Show bore some similarities to Bewitched; some of the sets used for the Simmses' house and backyard were used from the Stephenses' home. The name of Paul's law firm McNish and Simms was similar to the name of Darrin Stephens's advertising agency McMann and Tate. Many actors regularly seen on Bewitched also appeared on Lynde's series, including Mabel Albertson, Herb Voland, Jack Collins, Richard X. Slattery, and Dick Wilson.

At the same time, to help fulfill the network's contract with Bewitched, Asher and Harry Ackerman created another ABC sitcom for the 1972–1973 season called Temperatures Rising. The series starred James Whitmore and Cleavon Little. In its first year, the sitcom struggled with its format and ratings and in midseason, Asher was replaced as producer by Bruce Johnson and Duke Vincent. Despite its challenges, the series ended its first year with a respectable 29 share and was renewed for the 1973–1974 season. To improve ratings and help Paul Lynde fulfill his contract with the network after the demise of his show, ABC wanted to make some changes. When The New Temperatures Rising Show debuted in September 1973, Lynde had replaced Whitmore and the emphasis on black comedy in the show became more prominent. In spite of the changes, ratings for the series fell well below those of the previous season.

When Screen Gems head John Mitchell and ABC chief programmer Barry Diller noticed that The New Temperatures Rising Show was failing, they contacted William Asher and asked him to return and salvage the series. The show was resurrected on July 18, 1974, after a six-month hiatus with its original title Temperatures Rising. Joining Lynde and Little in the cast was Bewitched alumna Alice Ghostley. Once again, the changes in cast and format failed to resuscitate the series and Temperatures Rising was canceled, with the final episode broadcast on August 29, 1974, ending William Asher's original contract with ABC and Bewitched.

In 1976, Ashmont Productions produced the pilot for the television series Tabitha, the story of the daughter from Bewitched working as an adult at a television station. However, they did not produce the 1976–1977 one-season television series. As mentioned before in this article, William Asher's and Elizabeth Montgomery's Ashmont Productions was one of the production companies for Bewitched.

== Cultural context ==
In February 1964, feminist Betty Friedan's two-part essay "Television and the Feminine Mystique" for TV Guide criticized the portrayal of women in television shows as simplistic, manipulative, and insecure household drudges whose time was spent dreaming of love and plotting revenge on their husbands. Samantha's character differed from this stereotype and Endora used Friedan-like language to criticize the boring drudgery of household life. Others have looked how the series "play[ed] into and subvert[ed] a rich load of cultural stereotypes and allusions" regarding witches, gender roles, advertising, and consumerism. In the episode "Eat at Mario's" (May 27, 1965), Samantha and Endora use their powers to defend and promote a quality Italian restaurant. They take delight in an active, aggressive role in the public space, breaking new ground in the depiction of women in television.

Airing during the civil rights era, Bewitched broached taboos about interracial marriage.

In a 1992 interview, Elizabeth Montgomery was asked if the show was an allegory about closeted homosexuality. She answered, "Don't think that didn't enter our minds at the time. We talked about it on the set—certainly not in production meetings—that this was about people not being allowed to be what they really are. If you think about it, Bewitched is about repression in general and all the frustration and trouble it can cause."

At its heart, the series was about the basic issues of achievement vs. instant gratification, a recurring theme in such episodes as "A Is for Aardvark" (directed by Ida Lupino) and "Charlie Harper, Winner". Darrin continually asserts the value of earned accomplishment, though even Samantha has to remind him when he weakens and asks for the easy way out (as do the scriptwriters). Samantha is drawn to Darrin partially because her former life allowed so much opulence that it became frivolous and self-indulgent, attributes that her flamboyant family continued to exemplify.

The Stephens couple would also notably sleep in the same bed in a time when television couples were often depicted as sleeping in separate beds.

== Reception ==
Walter Metz attributes the success of the series to its snappy writing, the charm of Elizabeth Montgomery, and the talents of its large supporting cast. The show also made use of respected film techniques for its special effects. The soundtrack was unique, notably where it concerned the synthesized sound of nose twitching.

The first episodes featured a voice-over narrator "performing comic sociological analyses" of the role of a witch in middle-class suburbia. The style was reminiscent of Hollywood films such as Will Success Spoil Rock Hunter? (1957). In a 1991 audio interview with film historian Ronald Haver, Elizabeth Montgomery revealed that her father Robert Montgomery was originally approached and asked to narrate these episodes, but he turned it down. Instead, the narration was done by Academy Award-winning actor José Ferrer, who did not receive credit.

The series inspired the rival show I Dream of Jeannie (1965–1970) on NBC, which was produced by the same studio as Bewitched (Screen Gems).

Bewitched heavily inspired the manga and later anime Sally the Witch, which would then go on to start the entire Magical Girl genre.

On June 15, 2005, TV Land unveiled a Samantha statue in Salem to mark the show's 40th anniversary. On hand were three surviving actors from the show, Bernard Fox (Dr. Bombay), Erin Murphy (Tabitha), and Kasey Rogers (Louise Tate), as well as producer/director William Asher.

== Primetime Emmy Awards ==
Year	Category	Nominee(s)	Result
1966	Outstanding Comedy Series	Jerry Davis	Nominated
1966	Outstanding Continued Performance by an Actress in a Leading Role in a Comedy Series	Elizabeth Montgomery	Nominated
1966	Outstanding Performance by an Actress in a Supporting Role in a Comedy	Agnes Moorehead	Nominated
1966	Outstanding Performance by an Actress in a Supporting Role in a Comedy	Alice Pearce	Won
1966	Outstanding Directorial Achievement in Comedy	William Asher	Won
1967	Outstanding Comedy Series	William Froug	Nominated
1967	Outstanding Continued Performance by an Actress in a Leading Role in a Comedy Series	Elizabeth Montgomery	Nominated
1967	Outstanding Continued Performance by an Actress in a Leading Role in a Comedy Series	Agnes Moorehead	Nominated
1967	Outstanding Performance by an Actress in a Supporting Role in a Comedy	Marion Lorne	Nominated
1967	Outstanding Directorial Achievement in Comedy	William Asher	Nominated
1968	Outstanding Comedy Series	William Asher	Nominated
1968	Outstanding Continued Performance by an Actor in a Leading Role in a Comedy Series	Dick York	Nominated
1968	Outstanding Continued Performance by an Actress in a Leading Role in a Comedy Series	Elizabeth Montgomery	Nominated
1968	Outstanding Performance by an Actress in a Supporting Role in a Comedy	Marion Lorne	Won
1968	Outstanding Performance by an Actress in a Supporting Role in a Comedy	Agnes Moorehead	Nominated
1969	Outstanding Comedy Series	William Asher	Nominated
1969	Outstanding Continued Performance by an Actress in a Leading Role in a Comedy Series	Elizabeth Montgomery	Nominated
1969	Outstanding Continued Performance by an Actress in a Supporting Role in a Series	Agnes Moorehead	Nominated
1970	Outstanding Continued Performance by an Actress in a Leading Role in a Comedy Series	Elizabeth Montgomery	Nominated
1970	Outstanding Supporting Actress in a Comedy Series	Agnes Moorehead	Nominated
1971	Outstanding Supporting Actress in a Comedy Series	Agnes Moorehead	Nominated
1971	Outstanding Achievement in Makeup	Rolf J. Miller	Nominated

== Spin-offs, crossovers, and remakes ==
=== The Flintstones ===
The 1965 episode of The Flintstones titled "Samantha" (1965) featured Dick York and Elizabeth Montgomery as Darrin and Samantha Stephens, who have just moved into the neighborhood. This crossover was facilitated by both series being broadcast on ABC.

=== Tabitha and Adam and the Clown Family ===
An animated TV special made in 1972 by Hanna-Barbera Productions for The ABC Saturday Superstar Movie, this featured teenaged versions of Tabitha and Adam visiting their aunt and her family who travel with a circus. The show aired on December 2, 1972.

=== Tabitha ===
In 1977, a short-lived spin-off titled Tabitha aired on ABC. Lisa Hartman played Tabitha, now an adult working with her brother Adam at television station KXLA. Several continuity differences from the original series existed. Adam and Tabitha had both aged far more than the intervening five years between the two series would have allowed. Adam also had become Tabitha's older mortal brother, rather than her younger warlock brother, as he was in Bewitched. Supporting character Aunt Minerva (Karen Morrow) says she has been close to Tabitha since childhood, though she had never been mentioned once in the original series. Tabitha's parents are mentioned, but never appear. Bernard Fox, Sandra Gould, George Tobias, and Dick Wilson reprised their roles, though, as Dr. Bombay, Gladys Kravitz, Abner Kravitz, and "various drunks", respectively.

=== Passions ===
The 1999–2008 NBC soap opera Passions featured several appearances by Bernard Fox, playing Dr. Bombay. In another echo of Bewitched, the resident witch on Passions, Tabitha Lenox (Juliet Mills), named her daughter Endora.

=== Theatrical film ===
Bewitched inspired a 2005 film starring Nicole Kidman and Will Ferrell, distributed by Columbia Pictures. The film, departing from the show's family-oriented tone, is not a remake, but takes a metafictional approach, with the action focused on arrogant, failing Hollywood actor Jack Wyatt (Ferrell), who is offered a career comeback playing Darrin in a remake of Bewitched. The role is contingent upon him finding the perfect woman to play Samantha. He chooses an unknown named Isabel Bigelow (Kidman), who coincidentally, is an actual witch. The film was written, directed, and produced by Nora Ephron, who stated that the original series was about the conflict between a powerful woman and a husband who could not deal with that power, and the anger of a bride's mother at seeing her daughter marry beneath her. Ephron's version was poorly received by most critics and was a financial failure.

The film earned $22 million less than the production cost domestically, but it earned an additional $68 million internationally. The New York Times called Bewitched "an unmitigated disaster."

=== Comic adaptations ===
Dell Comics adapted the series into a comic-book series in 1964. The artwork was done by Henry Scarpelli.

In 1966, the series was adapted as a strip in Lady Penelope, beginning from issue 12 and lasting until the comic's demise in 1969. It ran for 14 issues.

=== Novel ===
A novel by Al Hine was published in 1965 by Dell. It was translated into Japanese and Dutch.

=== Games ===
A board game was published by Game Gems in 1964. Stymie, a card game based on Bewitched, was published in 1964 by Milton Bradley. A print and play card game was published in 2007 by MM Board Games. A match 3 puzzle video game was published in 2005.

=== Television remakes ===
- Argentina: A remake called Hechizada, produced by Telefé, aired in early 2007. It starred Florencia Peña as Samantha, Gustavo Garzón as her husband, Eduardo, and Georgina Barbarrosa as Endora. This show adapted original scripts to an Argentinian context, with local humor and a contemporary setting. The show was cancelled due to low ratings after a few weeks.
- Japan: TBS, a flagship station of Japan News Network, produced a remake called Okusama wa majo (奥さまは魔女, meaning '(My) Wife is a Witch'), also known as Bewitched in Tokyo. Eleven episodes were broadcast on JNN stations Fridays at 10 p.m., from January 16 to March 26, 2004, and a special on December 21, 2004. The main character, Arisa Matsui, was portrayed by Ryoko Yonekura. Okusama wa majo is also the Japanese title for the original American series.
- India: In 2002, Sony Entertainment Television began airing Meri Biwi Wonderful, a local adaptation of Bewitched.
  - On June 5, 2026, it was confirmed that Sony Pictures Networks will remake Bewitched again titled as Lo Chudail Chali Sasural which will star Hiba Nawab and Adhik Mehta in lead roles and air on Sony SAB from July 2026.
- Russia: In 2009, TV3 broadcast a remake titled Моя любимая ведьма (My Favorite Witch), starring Anna Zdor as Nadia (Samantha), Ivan Grishanov as Ivan (Darrin), and Marina Esepenko as Nadia's mother. The series is very similar to the original, with most episodes based on those from the original series. American comedy writer/producer Norm Gunzenhauser oversaw the writing and directing of the series.
- United Kingdom: In 2008, the BBC made a pilot episode of a British version, with Sheridan Smith as Samantha, Tom Price as Darrin, and veteran actress Frances de la Tour as Endora.

=== Proposed reboots ===
In August 2011, CBS reportedly ordered a script to be written by Marc Lawrence for a rebooted series of Bewitched.

On October 22, 2014, Sony Pictures Television announced that it sold a pilot of Bewitched to NBC as a possible entry for the 2015—2016 US television season. This show would have concerned Tabitha's daughter Daphne, a single woman who despite having the same magical powers as her mother, grandmother, and great-grandmother, is determined not to use her special abilities to find a soul mate. The new version of the proposed series, written by Abby Kohn and Marc Silverstein, had been on the radar of several major networks, including ABC, after Sony began shopping the project to interested parties.

On August 23, 2018, ABC announced that it had bought a pilot for a single-camera Bewitched remake from Black-ish creator Kenya Barris. This was Barris's last new project for the network before his exclusive contract with Netflix went into effect. Around the same time, an animated reboot series was optioned by 9 Story Entertainment and GO-N Productions, but never got off the ground.

On June 8, 2023, it was announced Sony Pictures Television Kids would be producing an animated Bewitched series that was to center on Samantha and Darrin's daughter Tabitha as a teenager. The series was previewed at MIPJunior on October 3, 2023. On February 14, 2024, Judalina Neira was announced to be writing and executive producing the reboot series. On November 3, 2025, it was announced that Fox has picked up the reboot, and in addition, the animated series from Sony Pictures Television Kids switched to live action with Flying Bark Productions joining as co-producer.

=== WandaVision ===
The second episode of drama-mystery television miniseries WandaVision, titled "Don't Touch That Dial", alludes to the series through an animated title sequence and the premise of Wanda Maximoff and Vision living an idyllic suburban life trying to conceal their true natures. Exteriors of the neighborhood were filmed at the now-Warner Ranch backlot with Wanda's nosy neighbor Agatha Harkness living in the Stephens house.

== Episodes ==
Season	Episodes	Originally released		Rank	Rating
Season	Episodes	First released	Last released	Rank	Rating
1	36	September 17, 1964	June 3, 1965	2	31.0
2	38	September 16, 1965	June 9, 1966	7	25.9 (Note: Tied with The Beverly Hillbillies)
3	33	September 15, 1966	May 4, 1967	7	23.4 (Note: Tied with Daktari and The Beverly Hillbillies)
4	33	September 7, 1967	May 16, 1968	11	23.5
5	30	September 26, 1968	April 24, 1969	11	23.3 (Note: Tied with Mission: Impossible and The Red Skelton Show)
6	30	September 18, 1969	April 16, 1970	24	20.6 (Note: Tied with NBC Saturday Night at the Movies and The F.B.I.)
7	28	September 24, 1970	April 22, 1971	—N/a	—N/a
8	26	September 15, 1971	March 25, 1972	72	11.3

=== Episode availability ===
==== Syndication history ====
After completing its original run, ABC Daytime and ABC Saturday Morning continued to air the series until 1973. Since then, Bewitched has been syndicated on many local US broadcast stations, first from 1973 to 1982 and then since 1993, including Columbia TriStar Television as part of the Screen Gems Network syndication package from 1999 to 2001, which featured bonus wraparound content during episode airings in 1999.

From 1973 to 1982, the entire series was syndicated by Screen Gems/Columbia Pictures. By the late 1970s, numerous local stations either omitted black-and-white episodes or exclusively aired them during the summer, as there was a prevailing belief that such episodes were generally less appealing than those filmed in color. From 1981 to about 1991, only the color episodes were syndicated in barter syndication by DFS Program Exchange. The first two seasons, which were in black and white, were not included because Columbia retained the rights to them. Beginning in 1989, Nick at Nite only aired the black-and-white episodes, which were originally unedited. The edited versions of the episodes continued in barter syndication until 1992. Columbia syndicated the entire series beginning in 1991. The remaining six color seasons were added to Nick at Nite's lineup in March 1998 in a week-long Dueling Darrins Marathon. Later, seasons 1 and 2 were colorized and made available for syndication. Eventually, they were made available for DVD sales. The cable television channel WTBS carried seasons 3–8 throughout the 1980s and 1990s from DFS on a barter basis like most local stations that carried the show.

The show aired on the Hallmark Channel from August 6, 2001, to May 24, 2003. Bewitched then aired on TV Land from May 31, 2003, to November 10, 2006, and it returned to TV Land on March 3, 2008, but left the schedule on September 30, 2011.

In September 2008, the show began to air on WGN America, and in October 2012, it began to air on Logo up until January 1, 2024.

Antenna TV has aired the show in conjunction with I Dream of Jeannie since the network's launch in 2011. The cable and satellite network FETV also airs the show together with I Dream of Jeannie. The show also aired on GAC Family for a brief time in 2021.

===== Overseas markets =====
In Australia, this series aired on the Nine Network's digital channel GO! later it moved to the Seven Network's digital channels 7TWO later 7flix. Prior to this, the show aired in reruns on Network Ten in 1995 before moving to the Seven Network a year later. In New Zealand, the entire series screened on TVNZ and was repeated throughout the 1980s.

In Italy, the series aired on Raiuno, Telemontecarlo, Italia 1, Rai 3, Canale 5, Retequattro, Boing & Paramount Network under the name Vita da strega (Life as a Witch) from 1967 until 1979.

The Russia-based channel Domashny aired the show from 2008 to 2010.

==== Internet ====
Selected episodes may be viewed on iTunes, YouTube, Tubi, IMDb, Hulu, The Minisode Network, Crackle, and Amazon.com. The show also airs on free streaming TV app Pluto TV.

==== Home media ====
Beginning in 2005, Sony Pictures Home Entertainment released all eight seasons of Bewitched. In regions 1 and 4, seasons 1 and 2 were each released in two versions—one as originally broadcast in black and white, and one colorized. The complete series set only contains the colorized versions of seasons 1 and 2. Only the colorized editions were released in Regions 2 and 4. A disc of the first three episodes was also released in Region 1 to coincide with the 2005 movie.

On August 27, 2013, it was announced that Mill Creek Entertainment had acquired the rights to various television series from the Sony Pictures library including Bewitched. They have subsequently re-released the first six seasons, with seasons 1 and 2 available only in their black-and-white versions.

On October 6, 2015, Mill Creek Entertainment re-released Bewitched – The Complete Series on DVD in Region 1. Special features were stripped from the release. The first two seasons are in black and white only.

On February 5, 2025, Australian distributor ViaVision Entertainment released a Blu-ray box set of the first two seasons of Bewitched, containing all first- and second-season episodes in high-definition black and white, with standard-definition versions of all colorized episodes. On May 28, 2025, ViaVision Entertainment released a Blu-ray box set of the next two seasons of Bewitched, containing all third- and fourth-season episodes in high-definition color. On July 22, 2025, Mill Creek Entertainment released the entire series on Blu-ray for its 60th anniversary in North America.

== Sources ==
- Metz, Walter (2007), Bewitched, Wayne State University Press, ISBN 978-0814335802
- Spangler, Lynn C. (2003). Television Women from Lucy to Friends: Fifty Years of Sitcoms and Feminism. Greenwood Publishing Group. ISBN 978-0-3132878-1-7.
