= William Asher =

American film and television producer, director, and screenwriter (1921–2012)

- Asher with his second wife, Elizabeth Montgomery, in 1964
- Born: William Milton Asher; August 8, 1921; New York City, NY, U.S.
- Died: July 16, 2012 (aged 90); Palm Desert, California, U.S.
- Resting place: Desert Memorial Park, Cathedral City, California
- Occupations: Director; producer; screenwriter
- Years active: 1948–1990
- Spouses: Danny Sue Nolan (m. 1951; div. 1961) Elizabeth Montgomery (m. 1963; div. 1973) Joyce Bulifant (m. 1976; div. 1993) Meredith Coffin (m. 1998)
- Children: 6

William Milton Asher (August 8, 1921 – July 16, 2012) was an American television and film producer, film director, and screenwriter. He was one of the most prolific early television directors, producing or directing over two dozen series.

With television in its infancy, Asher introduced the sitcom Our Miss Brooks, which was adapted from a radio show. He began directing I Love Lucy by 1952. As a result of his early success, Asher was considered an "early wunderkind of TV-land," and was hyperbolically credited in one magazine article with "inventing" the sitcom. In 1964, he began to direct episodes of Bewitched, which starred his wife Elizabeth Montgomery. He produced the series from the fourth season.

Asher was also crucial to the success of AIP's Beach Party series.

Asher was nominated for an Emmy Award four times, winning once for directing Bewitched in 1966. He was also nominated for the DGA Award in 1951 for I Love Lucy.

== Early life ==
Asher was born in New York City to stage actress Lillian Bonner and producer Ephraim M. Asher (1887–1937), whose movie credits were mostly as an associate producer. His sister, Betty Asher, was an MGM publicist for Judy Garland. His father was Jewish and his mother was Catholic. Asher's family moved to Los Angeles when he was around 3, where he often accompanied his father to the movie studio.

Asher's parents divorced when he was 11, resulting in a return to New York with his mother. He later recalled that this period of his life was filled with turmoil, because his mother was an abusive alcoholic. As a result of having to live in New York with his mother, he dropped out of school and, after working in the mailroom at Universal Studios in Los Angeles, he joined the Army in 1941. He served in the Army Signal Corps for four years, stationed in Astoria, Queens New York City as a unit photographer.

== Career ==
Asher returned to California to direct Leather Gloves (1948), a low-budget film. He eventually gravitated to television (then a new medium), and gained a job writing short story "fillers" for various programs, which evolved into a series which was titled Little Theatre. From this work, he gained a contract with Columbia Pictures to work on a film musical for Harry Cohn.

From CBS Studios, Asher received an offer to direct Our Miss Brooks, starring Eve Arden, a television version of the radio show. In 1952, Desi Arnaz asked Asher to direct an episode of his series I Love Lucy; by that show's end in 1957, Asher had directed 110 of the series' 179 episodes, Asher later commented that even though the creators knew the show was good, they did not believe it would become an American icon. "When we did the show, we thought, 'That's it, we're done with it.' We never dreamed it would last this long. Lucille Ball, obviously, was one of TV's true pioneers."

Asher was considered an "early wunderkind of TV-land, blazing a path in the new medium" of television. Writer and producer William Froug described Asher as a "hyphenate of a different stripe, a director-producer", commenting that he was one of many "restless Hollywood professionals who, like nomads, drifted from job to job, always delivering competent, if not inspired work".

In addition to Our Miss Brooks and I Love Lucy, Asher directed episodes of The Colgate Comedy Hour, Make Room for Daddy, The Twilight Zone (1959 TV series), The Patty Duke Show, Gidget, The Dukes of Hazzard, and Alice. Asher and Montgomery befriended President John F. Kennedy, and, together with Frank Sinatra, planned Kennedy's 1961 inaugural ceremony.

Asher's best-known work was Bewitched, which he directed regularly over its entire eight-year run, although he was only credited as producer for its last five seasons. At that time, he was married to the show's star Elizabeth Montgomery. They divorced soon after the series' cancellation in 1972. In 1986, he attempted to return to television, this time, with Fred Whitehead, Orion Television executive to set up Asher/Whitehead Productions, but the only television project they produced was Kay O'Brien, which was canceled after only one season.

Asher directed and co-wrote a number of Beach party films, including the original Beach Party, and several others in the series: Muscle Beach Party, Bikini Beach, Beach Blanket Bingo, and How to Stuff a Wild Bikini. Critic Wheeler Winston Dixon later suggested that the Beach Party films were not only "visions of paradise" for the audience, but also for Asher, who used them "to create a fantasy world to replace his own troubled childhood".

Asher also directed movies made for TV. He later recalled his directorial years:

When I look back at my own work, Bewitched stays with me the most, and Lucy, and the Beach Party pictures. The scripts of the Beach Party films were sheer nonsense, but they were fun and positive. ... When kids see the films now, they can get some idea of what the '60s were like. The whole thing was a dream, of course. But it was a nice dream.

Asher received a star on the Palm Springs Walk of Stars in November 2003.

== Personal life ==
In 1951, Asher married Danny Sue Nolan, with whom he had two children; the couple divorced in 1961. Asher then married Elizabeth Montgomery in 1963, just before Bewitched began its run. They had three children and divorced in 1973. His third marriage was to Joyce Bulifant and it lasted from 1976 to 1993. He adopted her son, actor John Mallory Asher. This marriage also ended in divorce. In his later years, Asher lived in Palm Desert, California, with Meredith Coffin Asher, his fourth and final wife.

Asher counted Frank Sinatra, Peter Lawford and Sammy Davis Jr. as his friends, and sometimes, he caroused with them in Las Vegas, flying there from Hollywood in Sinatra's plane, and then flying back in order to be at work at the studio at 5 AM.

== Death ==
Asher died from complications of Alzheimer's disease at age 90 on July 16, 2012.

== Television filmography ==
| Debut Year | Title |
As director
| 1950 | The Colgate Comedy Hour |
| 1951 | Racket Squad |
| 1951 | I Love Lucy |
| 1951 | The Dinah Shore Show |
| 1952 | Our Miss Brooks |
| 1953 | Make Room for Daddy |
| 1953 | The Ray Bolger Show |
| 1954 | Willy |
| 1954 | The Lineup |
| 1955 | The Jane Wyman Show |
| 1957 | The Thin Man |
| 1958 | The Donna Reed Show |
| 1959 | Fibber McGee and Molly |
| 1959 | The Twilight Zone |
| 1963 | The Patty Duke Show |
| 1964 | Bewitched |
| 1965 | Gidget |
| 1972 | Temperatures Rising |
| 1972 | The Paul Lynde Show |
| 1976 | Alice |
| 1977 | Tabitha |
| 1979 | The Dukes of Hazzard |
| 1979 | Flatbush |
| 1979 | The Bad News Bears |
| 1984 | Crazy Like a Fox |
| 1986 | Kay O'Brien |
As producer
| 1955 | The Jane Wyman Show |
| 1960 | The Land of Oz |
| 1963 | The Patty Duke Show |
| 1967 | Bewitched |
| 1972 | Temperatures Rising |
| 1972 | The Paul Lynde Show |
| 1980 | Here's Boomer |
| 1986 | Kay O'Brien |
As writer
| 1973 | The Young and the Restless (1988) |

== Cinema filmography ==
| Year | Title | Position |
|---|---|---|
| 1948 | Leather Gloves | Director |
| 1957 | The Shadow on the Window | Director |
| 1957 | The 27th Day | Director |
| 1963 | Beach Party | Director and co-writer |
| 1963 | Johnny Cool | Producer and director |
| 1964 | Bikini Beach | Director and co-writer |
| 1964 | Muscle Beach Party | Director and co-writer |
| 1965 | Beach Blanket Bingo | Director and co-writer |
| 1965 | How to Stuff a Wild Bikini | Director and co-writer |
| 1966 | Fireball 500 | Director and co-writer |
| 1982 | Night Warning | Director |
| 1985 | Movers & Shakers | Co-producer and director |
