= Froug's =

Froug's department store was founded in May 1929 by M. E. "Mike" Froug and Ohren Smulian. The Froug family moved to the Oklahoma and Indian Territories in 1898, operating a chain of family necessity stores in Stroud, Sapulpa, Bristow, Prague and Chandler. Following the oil discovery in Red Fork, Oklahoma, the elder Froug closed his mercantile businesses and moved his family to Tulsa to enter the real estate business. After the initial oil boom in Oklahoma, the family moved to Little Rock, Arkansas but returned to Tulsa 25 years later to open Froug's.

Froug's was acquired by Shelton Greenberg and his associates in 1980, and all Tulsa stores were closed in 1985.
