= Sol Saks =

American actor and screenwriter (1910–2011)

- Born: December 13, 1910; New York City, U.S.
- Died: April 16, 2011 (aged 100); Sherman Oaks, Los Angeles, California, U.S.
- Occupations: Actor; screenwriter; producer
- Years active: 1953–2005

Sol Saks (December 13, 1910 – April 16, 2011) was an American screenwriter best known as the creator of the television sitcom Bewitched.

== Life and career ==
Saks was born in New York City to Jewish parents. He attended Harrison High School in Chicago. He was a radio actor as a child.

In 1938, Saks left a job at the Dunsmuir (California) News, and in 1939 he began working as a freelance writer, creating scripts for shows that included The First Nighter Program. He later wrote for radio and TV series such as My Favorite Husband, Mr. Adams and Eve, and I Married Joan.

Saks wrote the screenplay for Cary Grant's last film, the comedy Walk, Don't Run. At the time of its release, Time said his dialogue on that film "bristles amiably from first to last."

He wrote The Craft of Comedy Writing, published by Writer's Digest Books.

== Death ==
Saks died of respiratory failure due to pneumonia on April 16, 2011, at the age of 100, in Los Angeles, California.
