= The Farmer's Daughter (TV series) =

- Opening title card of The Farmer's Daughter's 3rd season
- Genre: Sitcom
- Starring: Inger Stevens; William Windom
- Theme music composer: Barry Mann; Cynthia Weil
- Composers: Van Alexander; George Duning; Jerry Fielding; Charles Albertine; Dave Grusin
- Country of origin: United States
- Original language: English
- No. of seasons: 3
- No. of episodes: 101 (73 in black-and-white, 28 in color)

Production
- Executive producer: Harry Ackerman
- Producers: Bob Claver; Peter Kortner
- Camera setup: Single-camera
- Running time: 25 minutes
- Production companies: Associated Arts, N.V. Screen Gems

Original release
- Network: ABC
- Release: September 20, 1963 – April 22, 1966

Related
- The Farmer's Daughter

The Farmer's Daughter is an American sitcom, loosely based on the 1947 film, that was produced by Screen Gems Television and aired on ABC from September 20, 1963, to April 22, 1966. It was sponsored by Lark Cigarettes and Clairol, for whom the two leading stars often appeared at the show's end, promoting the products; the commercials were also filmed. The Farmer's Daughter also enjoyed a brief run in syndication when it aired on CBN Cable from 1985 to 1989.

== Overview ==
The series stars Inger Stevens as Katy Holstrum, a young Swedish woman who becomes the housekeeper for widowed congressman Glen Morley. He has two sons, Steve (age 14) and Danny (8) at the time of the premiere. The congressman's mother is Agatha Morley.

The first and second seasons of the series were filmed in black-and-white, and two episodes of the third season were also filmed in black-and-white; the remaining 28 episodes of the third season were filmed in color. The last episode of the second season featured the two lead characters becoming engaged.

On the November 5, 1965, episode (just in time for sweeps), Katy Holstrum and Glen Morley were married in a wedding ceremony attended by 300 guests. Network censors objected to the original script of the honeymoon episode that had Glen bringing his new bride to a hotel room with twin beds and then saying, "But I asked for a double bed!" Forbidding use of the word "bed," the censors allowed it to be replaced with "accommodations," along with a glance at the bed.

After the wedding episode, the show's ratings, which were already declining, fell, and ABC canceled The Farmer's Daughter. In the penultimate episode, "Is He or Isn't He?", Katy adopts Glen's sons, providing the series closure as well as a happy ending. After the final April 22, 1966 episode, reruns of the show continued until September 2, 1966. The reruns began with a repeat of the wedding episode.

Unlike the 1947 film, Katy never ran for (nor was elected to) Congress in the series.

== Cast ==
- Inger Stevens as Katrin "Katy" Holstrum (later, Morley)
- William Windom as Glen Morley
- Mickey Sholdar as Steve Morley
- Rory O'Brien as Danny Morley
- Cathleen Nesbitt as Agatha Morley
- Philip Coolidge as Cooper, the butler (1963–1964)
- Florence Ravenel as Millie, the cook (1963–1964)
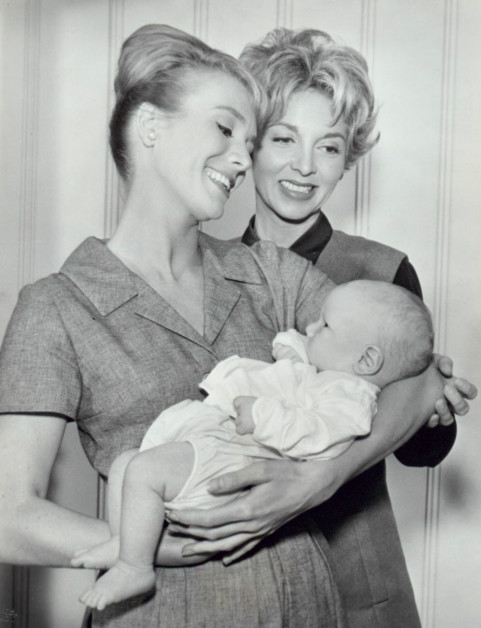
Inger Stevens (holding baby) and Beverly Garland, 1963.

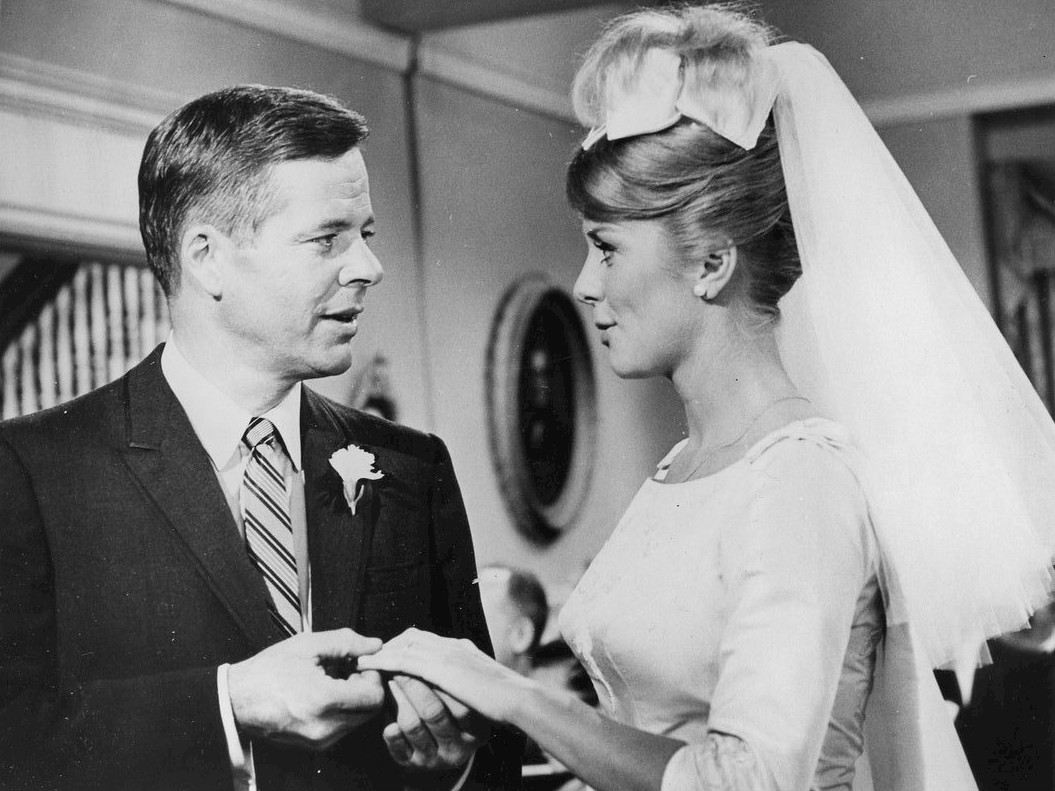
The Farmer's Daughter wedding

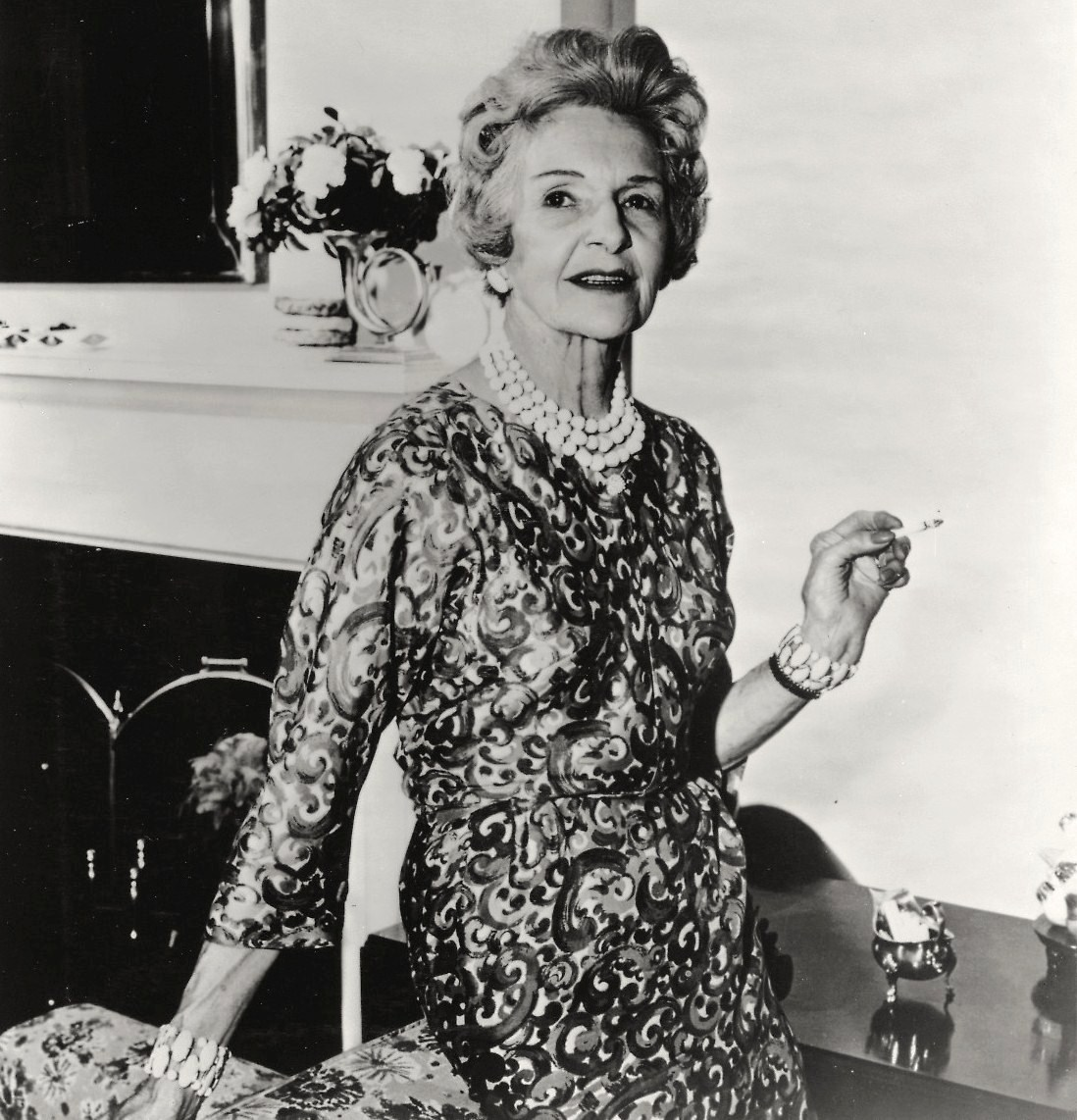
Cathleen Nesbitt in The Farmer's Daughter

== Episodes ==
=== Season 1 (1963–64) ===
All episodes in black-and-white

No. overall	No. in season	Title	Directed by	Written by	Original release date
1	1	"The Speechmaker: Part 1"	Ralph Nelson	John McGreevey	September 20, 1963
2	2	"The Speechmaker: Part 2"	Don Taylor	Steven Gethers	September 27, 1963
3	3	"Where's Katy?"	Don Taylor	Charles Woolf	October 4, 1963
4	4	"An Enterprising Young Man"	William D. Russell	Steven Gethers	October 11, 1963
5	5	"An Affair of State"	Don Taylor	Jerry Davis & Lee Loeb	October 18, 1963
6	6	"The Washington Spotlight"	William D. Russell	Budd Grossman	October 25, 1963
7	7	"The Stand-In"	Gene Nelson	Steven Gethers	November 1, 1963
8	8	"Comes the Revolution"	Mel Ferrer	John McGreevey	November 8, 1963
9	9	"Miss Cheese"	William D. Russell	Jerry Davis	November 15, 1963
10	10	"The Editorial Wheel"	Paul Nickell	Jerry Davis	November 29, 1963
11	11	"I Am the Most Beautiful"	Mel Ferrer	Steven Gethers	December 4, 1963
12	12	"One Rainy Night"	Paul Nickell	Jerry Davis	December 11, 1963
13	13	"The Simple Life"	William D. Russell	Steven Gethers	December 18, 1963 (Note: Originally scheduled for November 22, 1963, but delayed due to the assassination of John F. Kennedy)
14	14	"The Gypsy Love Song"	Mel Ferrer	Steven Gethers	December 25, 1963
15	15	"Mrs. Golden's Opportunity"	Paul Nickell	Jerry Davis & Lee Loeb	January 1, 1964
16	16	"Nobody's Perfect"	Paul Nickell	William Cowley	January 8, 1964
17	17	"Mr. Smith and the Birds"	Paul Nickell	Jerry Davis & Lee Loeb	January 15, 1964
18	18	"Cousin Helga Came to Dinner"	Paul Nickell	Meyer Dolinsky	January 22, 1964
19	19	"Marriage is for Real People"	Don Taylor	Steven Gethers	January 29, 1964
20	20	"Katy and the Imagemaker"	Paul Nickell	Peggy Chandler Dick	February 5, 1964
21	21	"The Playboy of Capitol Hill"	Gene Reynolds	William Cowley	February 12, 1964
22	22	"Bless Our Happy Home"	Gene Reynolds	Jerry Davis & Lee Loeb	February 19, 1964
23	23	"Katy and the Prince"	Paul Nickell	Walter Black	February 26, 1964
24	24	"The Swinger"	Gene Reynolds	Steven Gethers	March 4, 1964
25	25	"Katy Gets Arrested"	Gene Reynolds	Jerry Davis & Lee Loeb	March 11, 1964
26	26	"The Turkish Delight"	Don Taylor	Jerry Davis & Lee Loeb	March 18, 1964
27	27	"Christopher Columbus Who?"	Don Taylor	Arnold Horwitt	March 25, 1964
28	28	"The One Eyed Sloth"	Peter Kortner	Steven Gethers	April 1, 1964
29	29	"Young and in Love"	William D. Russell	Peggy Chandler Dick	April 8, 1964
30	30	"The Morley Report"	Jerry Paris	Meyer Dolinsky	April 15, 1964
31	31	"The Octopus"	William D. Russell	John McGreevey	April 22, 1964
32	32	"The Next Mrs. Morley"	Paul Nickell	Charles Woolf	April 29, 1964
33	33	"Rendezvous for Two"	William D. Russell	Steven Gethers	May 6, 1964
34	34	"My Son, the Athlete"	William D. Russell	Peggy Chandler Dick & Mike Adams	May 13, 1964
35	35	"Mismatch Maker"	Don Taylor	Steven Gethers	May 20, 1964
36	36	"A Locket for Agatha"	Don Taylor	Lee Loeb	May 27, 1964

=== Season 2 (1964–65) ===
All episodes in black-and-white

No. overall	No. in season	Title	Directed by	Written by	Original release date
37	1	"The Waiting Game"	Don Taylor	Steven Gethers	September 18, 1964
38	2	"The Mink Machine"	Don Taylor	Stan Cutler	September 25, 1964
39	3	"Real Live Congressman"	William D. Russell	William Cowley	October 2, 1964
40	4	"Past Perfect"	Don Taylor	Steven Gethers	October 9, 1964
41	5	"Scandal in Washington"	William D. Russell	Jerry Seelen & Jack Raymond	October 16, 1964
42	6	"Love on the Picket Line"	William D. Russell	Richard Powell	October 23, 1964
43	7	"The Name of the Game"	William D. Russell	Richard Powell	October 30, 1964
44	8	"Help Not Wanted"	Don Taylor	Mae Day & Peggy Chandler Dick	November 6, 1964
45	9	"Big Sultan, Little Sultan"	William D. Russell	Peggy Chandler Dick	November 13, 1964
46	10	"Katy's 76th Birthday"	Don Taylor	Jerry Davis	November 20, 1964
47	11	"The Neutral"	Don Taylor	Stan Cutler	November 27, 1964
48	12	"Speak for Yourself, John Katy"	William D. Russell	Peggy Chandler Dick	December 4, 1964
49	13	"Matter of Honor"	Fred de Cordova	Stan Cutler & Martin Donovan	December 11, 1964
50	14	"The Helping Hand"	Leonard Horn	Stan Cutler	December 18, 1964
51	15	"Like Father, Like Son"	Bob Claver	Peggy Chandler Dick	December 25, 1964
52	16	"Another Country Heard From"	Gene Nelson	Stan Cutler & Martin Donovan	January 1, 1965
53	17	"Follow the Leader"	Gene Nelson	Stan Cutler & Martin Donovan	January 8, 1965
54	18	"The Oscar Hummingbird Story"	Gene Nelson	Stan Cutler & Martin Donovan	January 15, 1965
55	19	"The Nesting Instinct"	Gene Nelson	Peggy Chandler Dick	January 22, 1965
56	20	"A Plague on Both Their Houses"	Alan Rafkin	Stan Cutler & Martin Donovan	January 29, 1965
57	21	"Katy by Moonlight"	Gene Nelson	Phil Leslie & Keith Fowler	February 5, 1965
58	22	"Exit Katy"	William Colleran	Peggy Chandler Dick	February 12, 1965
59	23	"Rich Man, Poor Man"	Gene Nelson	Stan Cutler & Martin Donovan	February 19, 1965
60	24	"Crime of Passion"	Fred de Cordova	Stan Cutler & Martin Donovan	March 5, 1965
61	25	"Why Don't They Ever Pick Me?"	Bob Claver	Stan Cutler & Martin Donovan	March 12, 1965
62	26	"Katy's New Job"	Herb Wallerstein	Peggy Chandler Dick	March 19, 1965
63	27	"Katy's Campaign"	Bob Claver	Stan Cutler & Martin Donovan	March 19, 1965
64	28	"The Woman Behind the Man"	Fred de Cordova	Joanna Lee & Howard Merrill	April 2, 1965
65	29	"Katy the Diplomat"	Edmond Levy	James Allardice & Tom Adair	April 16, 1965
66	30	"Katy's Castle"	William D. Russell	Warner Law	April 23, 1965
67	31	"Never Listen to Rumors"	William D. Russell	Phil Leslie	April 30, 1965
68	32	"Ja, Ja, a Thousand Times, Ja"	William D. Russell	Stan Cutler & Martin Donovan	May 7, 1965
69	33	"Nej, Nej, a Thousand Times, Nej"	William D. Russell	Peggy Chandler Dick	May 14, 1965
70	34	"The Hottest Ticket in Town"	William D. Russell	Stan Cutler & Martin Donovan	May 21, 1965
71	35	"Why Wait 'Till November?"	Bob Claver	Stan Cutler & Martin Donovan	May 28, 1965

=== Season 3 (1965–66) ===
The third and fourth episodes in black-and-white, the remainder in color

No. overall	No. in season	Title	Directed by	Written by	Original release date
72	1	"Here Comes the Bride's Father"	Richard Kinon	Stan Cutler & Martin Donovan	September 13, 1965
73	2	"Babe in the Woods"	Richard Kinon	Stan Cutler & Martin Donovan	September 20, 1965
74	3	"Stag at Bay"	Bob Claver	Stan Cutler & Martin Donovan	September 27, 1965
75	4	"Sleeping Beauty Revisited"	Bob Claver	Peggy Chantler Dick	October 11, 1965
76	5	"Forever is a Cast Iron Mess"	Richard Kinon	Phil Leslie	October 18, 1965
77	6	"Powder Puff Invasion"	Herb Wallerstein	Peggy Chandler Dick	October 25, 1965
78	7	"To Have and to Hold"	Bob Claver	Stan Cutler & Martin Donovan	November 5, 1965
79	8	"Crisis at Crystal Springs"	Bob Claver	Stan Cutler & Martin Donovan	November 12, 1965
80	9	"A Sonny Honeymoon"	Bob Claver	Stan Cutler & Martin Donovan	November 19, 1965
81	10	"High Fashion"	Richard Kinon	Joseph C. Cavella	November 26, 1965
82	11	"The Platinum Swizzle Stick"	Richard Kinon	Warner Law	December 3, 1965
83	12	"Steve, Boy Lovelorn"	Bob Claver	Peggy Chandler Dick	December 10, 1965
84	13	"Jewel Beyond Compare"	Richard Kinon	Stanley H. Silverman	December 17, 1965
85	14	"Glen-a-Gogh-Goh"	Seymour Robbie	Stanley H. Silverman	December 24, 1965
86	15	"Simple Joys of Nature"	Richard Kinon	Warner Law	December 31, 1965
87	16	"Moe Hill and the Mountains"	Richard Kinon	Joseph C. Cavella & Carol Cavella	January 7, 1966
88	17	"Oh, Boy, Is the Honeymoon Over?"	Sam Freedle	Peggy Chandler Dick	January 14, 1966
89	18	"The Fall and Rise of Steven Morley"	Bob Claver	Warner Law	January 21, 1966
90	19	"Have You Ever Thought of Building?"	Sam Freedle	Stan Cutler & Martin Donovan	January 28, 1966
91	20	"Katy in a Capsule"	Bob Claver	Stan Cutler & Martin Donovan	February 4, 1966
92	21	"Lo, the Smart Indian"	Herb Wallerstein	Stanley H. Silverman	February 11, 1966
93	22	"Steve, Boy Bohemian"	Richard Kinon	Peggy Chandler Dick	February 18, 1966
94	23	"Alias Katy Morley"	Sam Freedle	Don Richman & Janet Carlson	February 25, 1966
95	24	"Anyone for Spindling?"	Bob Claver	Stan Cutler & Martin Donovan	March 4, 1966
96	25	"Twelve Angry Women"	Richard Kinon	Janet Carlson & Don Richman	March 11, 1966
97	26	"The Last to Know"	Richard Kinon	Don Richman & Janet Carlson	March 18, 1966
98	27	"My Papa, the Politician"	Sam Freedle	Peggy Chandler Dick	March 25, 1966
99	28	"The Wife of Your Friend May Not Be a Friend of Your Wife"	Bob Claver	Stan Cutler & Martin Donovan	April 1, 1966
100	29	"Is He or Isn't He?"	Jerrold Bernstein	Peggy Chandler Dick	April 8, 1966
101	30	"Half an Anniversary"	Bob Claver	Stan Cutler & Martin Donovan	April 22, 1966

== Production ==
While the first two seasons were black & white, the third season brought some changes to the format, as the series began filming episodes in color. However, the third and fourth episodes had been shot in black-and-white.

== Reception ==
In its first season (filmed in black-and-white), The Farmer's Daughter competed against The Twilight Zone on CBS and the short-lived Larry Blyden series Harry's Girls on NBC. The series never reached the top 30 in ratings, but during its first two years it earned respectable ratings and proved to be moderately successful.

=== Awards and nominations ===
Year	Award	Result	Category	Recipient
1964	Golden Globe Award	Winner	Best TV Star - Female	Inger Stevens
1964	TV Guide Award	Winner	Favorite Female Performer	Inger Stevens
1964	Emmy Award	Nominated	Outstanding Writing Achievement in Comedy or Variety	Jerry Davis, Steve Gethers, Lee Loeb, and John McGreevey
1964	Emmy Award	Nominated	Outstanding Program Achievement in the Field of Comedy	-
1964	Emmy Award	Nominated	Outstanding Directorial Achievement in Comedy	Paul Nickell, William D. Russell, and Don Taylor
1964	Emmy Award	Nominated	Outstanding Continued Performance by an Actress in a Series (Lead)	Inger Stevens
