= List of The Flying Nun episodes =

This is a list of the 82 episodes of the U.S. sitcom The Flying Nun, originally broadcast on ABC-TV from September 7, 1967, to April 3, 1970.

The first two seasons are currently available on DVD by Sony Pictures Home Entertainment and Mill Creek Entertainment.

== Series overview ==
Season	Episodes	Originally released	
Season	Episodes	First released	Last released
1	30	September 7, 1967	April 11, 1968
2	26	September 26, 1968	April 10, 1969
3	26	September 17, 1969	April 3, 1970

== Episodes ==
=== Season 1 (1967–68) ===
No. overall	No. in season	Title	Directed by	Written by	Original release date
1	1	"The Flying Nun"	E. W. Swackhamer	Bernard Slade	September 7, 1967
Sister Jacqueline (Marge Redmond) and Sister Sixto (Shelley Morrison) go to pick up Sister Bertrille (Sally Field). Bertrille came to Puerto Rico to start her life as a novice at the Convent San Tanco. Before Jacqueline and Sixto arrive at the dock, a strong wind blows Bertrille into the water. She swims to a yacht belonging to Carlos Ramirez (Alejandro Rey), which was nearby. Carlos is the owner of the Carlos A-Go Go Discotheque and Casino. Jacqueline and Sixto finally get Bertrille to the Convent, which is in disrepair. A strong wind blows and because of the wing-like coronet of her nun's habit, Bertrille becomes airborne. Jacqueline tells Bertrille that the Reverend Mother Superior Placido (Madeleine Sherwood), who is away, is traditional. Bertrille meets the orphan children she is to teach. Bertrille starts to find ways to raise money for the Convent. Mother Superior returns and doesn't like Bertrille's methods. There is a parcel of land that the Convent could really use, but it is owned by Carlos and he refuses to sell. Bertrille visits Carlos and asks him to donate his land, but he declines. Meanwhile, Bertrille figures out how to maneuver her head and coronet in order to actually fly. While flying over the ocean, Bertrille sees a submarine (SSN591 Permit) surfacing and lands on it. A sailor sees her and goes to tell the Sub. Captain (Dabney Coleman). When they go back out, Bertrille is already gone. On Bertrille's approach to the submarine, the boat shown surfacing is SSN 591, however in next cut she is shown landing on an older diesel sub, which is dry. Carlos is in a small plane with a woman when Bertrille flies up and looks at him through the window. Thinking he is having a religious experience, he decides to donate his land. It is getting dark and Bertrille lands in an Army restricted area. Major Overland (Henry Beckman) questions her, thinking she may be a secret agent. She tries to explain that she flew in. Things are straightened out with the Major and Bertrille. Bertrille is worried that Reverend Mother will send her away, but she doesn't. Stanley Beck as Guard. Naomi Stevens as Sister Teresa. Linda Dangcil as Sister Ana. Vito Scotti as Captain Dominic Lopez. Margarita Cordova as Consuela. Song: Sally sings "Felicidad (The Happiness Word)" by Dominic Frontiere and Diane Hildebrand.
2	2	"The Convert"	E. W. Swackhamer	Bernard Slade	September 14, 1967
Sister Bertrille is improving at flying. After an all night poker game on his yacht, Carlos Ramirez sees Bertrille flying. He tells his girlfriend Dottie (Arlene Golonka) that he is giving up drinking, gambling and girls. Carlos' friends Tony Petroni (John Gabriel) and Lou Cottrell (Noam Pitlik) come by his Discotheque. Dottie tells them that all Carlos has been doing is reading religious books. Meanwhile, the Reverend Mother tells Bertrille that Bishop Dillion (Ivor Barry) will visiting for a few days. She does not want Bertrille flying at all while he is there. Sister Sixto tells the Reverend Mother and Bertrille that Carlos has been attending mass, which he never did before. Carlos tells Dottie that he saw a nun flying. Dottie goes to see Bertrille and tells her that Carlos has been having religious visions. Dottie says that he saw a nun flying. Bertrille tells Sister Jacqueline that while she wants Carlos to have the faith, she wants it to be for the right reason. Bertrille finds Carlos on the beach and tells him it was not a vision, she can actually fly. After she flies for him, he decides to return to his old ways. Bishop Dillion arrives and would like to meet Carlos to thank him for the land he donated to the Convent. Carlos is gambling with Tony and Lou and loses everything but his yacht. To recover everything, Carlos bets that the men will see Bertrille fly. Carlos begs Bertrille to fly but she is worried because of the Bishop. Bertrille agrees to fly over the yacht. Just then the Bishop shows up to thank Carlos. Tony and Lou see Bertrille flying. To prevent the Bishop from seeing her, Carlos bumps him overboard into the water. Song: Sally sings "Paint Me a Picture" by Dominic Frontiere and Diane Hildebrand.
3	3	"Old Cars for New"	Jerry Bernstein	Searle Kramer	September 21, 1967
Despite being mechanically inclined, Sister Bertrille cannot fix the convent's old station wagon. The nuns had planned take the children to the Feast of St. Anthony Carnival that day. Bertrille suggests to Reverend Mother that they trade the car in for another used car with the $800 they have. Bertrille makes a deal with used car dealer "Money Back" Hernando (Gino Conforti) for a car. Returning to the convent, the car breaks down. It happened near where Carlos and Diane (E. J. Peaker) are picnicking. In order to get rid of Bertrille, Carlos agrees to examine the car. Carlos is able to start the car, but it will only drive in reverse. He tells Bertrille to get her money back from Hernando. Hernando will only give her $500 when he receives it from the bank. Carlos reluctantly lends Bertrille his car to take the children to the carnival. Bertrille returns for the $500. The Sisters think that Carlos' car is the one Bertrille got from Hernando. The convent's water heater then breaks down. To get money for the water heater, Sister Jacqueline takes Carlos's car to Hernando. Hernando is confused. Bertrille tells Reverend Mother about Carlos' car. Carlos finds a way to get Hernando to buy the convent's original car for $3000 and teach Hernando a lesson. Susan Howard as Sister Susan. Note: Veteran character actor Gino Conforti credited this series with helping to launch his lengthy acting career in a 2018 interview on Gilbert Gottfried's Amazing Colossal Podcast. Conforti appeared in two more episodes.
4	4	"A Bell for San Tanco"	E. W. Swackhamer	Story by : Peggy Elliott; Teleplay by : Richard DeRoy	September 28, 1967
The convent's 300-year-old bell is starting to show its age. Sister Bertrille thinks she can repair it. Sister Jacqueline tells her that this bell was only meant to be temporary. 200 years ago the real one sunk on the ship, the Hidalgo, off the coast of Puerto Rico coming from Belgium. Bertrille's repair job did not work. She wonders if the sunken bell could be salvaged. Bertrille goes to see Carlos on his yacht. Pedro (Michael Pataki) tells Bertrille that Carlos is in a business conference. Carlos is really with his date, Binkie Worsley (Louise Sorel). Carlos thinks it is crazy to try and find the bell. When Binkie says it will be like a treasure hunt and she'll go with him, Carlos agrees to find the bell. That night, Carlos takes Binkie to an old house that is now a tourist spot. They are looking for a map that shows the location of where the ship sank. Bertrille, Jacqueline and Sister Ana go there as well. They all run into each other. Bertrille offers to go with Carlos and Binkie to search for the bell. What Bertrille doesn't know is that Carlos made the map himself. Carlos had Pedro buy a bell and drop it in that location. When Pedro ruins the map, Carlos has a hard time finding the bell. After they finally find the bell, Binkie falls overboard. Bertrille takes to the air and finds her. Later, Carlos learns that he found the original bell. Julio Medina as Caterer. Song: "I'm On My Way" by Diane Hildebrand and Dominic Frontiere.
5	5	"The Fatal Hibiscus"	E. W. Swackhamer	Story by : Gene Thompson; Teleplay by : Richard DeRoy	October 5, 1967
An Artist (Julio Medina) has just finished installing a new stained glass window in the convert. Sister Bertrille, who is playing baseball with the children outside, crashes through the window trying to catch a ball. Reverend Mother, who cares for Bertrille, decides to transfer her to another convent, possibly Rome. The high winds of San Juan are strengthening. Reverend Mother believes that Bertrille will not be able to control her flying and more accidents are sure to happen. Bertrille is obviously quite sad about the idea. She asks Reverend Mother to not tell the others. Meanwhile, Carlos shows Bertrille plans for the new playground. He wants Bertrille to supervise the construction. She tells him about the transfer. Sister Ana overhears Carlos and Reverend Mother talking about Bertrille. She misunderstands and believes Bertrille is dying. The Sisters decide to make Bertrille's last days as comfortable as possible. They are surprised that Reverend Mother remains so stern with Bertrille. They all now give Reverend Mother the cold shoulder. Sister Jacqueline learns that Bertrille is being transferred and is not dying. Bertrille crashes through the repaired stained glass window. Carlos plans a protest march with the children to keep Bertrille at the convent. Mother David (Irene Tedrow) arrives for a visit. She sees the children and many of the townspeople there to support Bertrille. Reverend Mother learns that Carlos did not plan the protest. She now knows how the people feel about Bertrille and she can stay. Judy Pace as Go-Go #2. Song: "Who Needs Wings To Fly?" (Theme) by Dominic Frontiere and Sid Wayne.
6	6	"Flight of a Dodo Bird"	E. W. Swackhamer	Bernard Slade	October 12, 1967
While flying, Sister Bertrille suddenly feels dizzy and has double vision. This causes her to crash land into a fountain in the convent. When the dizziness persists, Dr. Tapia (Don Diamond) examines Bertrille. She has a inner ear infection which should clear up in a few days. Dr. Tapia is also concerned that Reverend Mother has been under stress. Dr. Tapia has church psychologist Father Lundigan (John Astin) come to see Reverend Mother. Reverend Mother tells Lundigan that she is stressed. as she worries about Bertrille. Reverend Mother tries to tell him that Bertrille can fly. She is less worried about the flying than Bertrille's landings. Lundigan tells Sister Jacqueline that Reverend Mother desires to be a flying nun, free from obligations. Lundigan worries when Jacqueline says there really is a flying nun at the convent. Reverend Mother arranges for Lundigan to witness Bertrille flying. She asks Bertrille if she feels well enough to fly. Bertrille's first attempt fails due to her losing her balance. Her next several attempts also fail for various reasons. Lundigan is set to leave, but he reluctantly agrees to stay one more day. Lundigan starts to believe he has been imprisoned the convent. That night, Lundigan sneaks out of the convent. The next morning Bertrille is able to fly. Lundigan is in the airplane and sees Bertrille flying outside. He thinks he is going crazy. Song: Sally and the children sing "I'm On My Way" by Diane Hildebrand and Dominic Frontiere.
7	7	"Polly Wants a Cracked Head"	Jerry Bernstein	Richard DeRoy	October 19, 1967
Sisters Bertrille and Jacqueline are in town to make some house visits. They hear a woman yelling at what they believe is a child. The woman is Rose Dolan (Norma Crane) and the child turns out to be a parrot named Junior (Mel Blanc voice). Rose is tired of Junior's sassy back talk and wants to kill the bird. Jacqueline tells Bertrille that pets are not allowed at the convent. Bertrille thinks she can find a home for Junior, but has no luck. They sneak the bird into the convent. While having dinner, the sisters hear Junior singing. Reverend Mother tells Bertrille that the bird will have to go. Bertrille, Jacqueline and Sixto spend much of the night trying to teach Junior a prayer. In the morning Bertrille is happy when Junior does recite the prayer. Junior is reciting the prayer in front of the children and Reverend Mother sees this. But then Junior calls Reverend Mother "sweetie" and asks her for a kiss. Bertrille asks Carlos to take the bird. Junior disrupts Carlos' relationship with his date, Cecilia. Carlos throws things at Junior and the bird flies out the window. Rose tells Bertrille that she had a change of heart and wants Junior back. Bertrille tells her he flew away. Bertrille flies around, finds Junior and returns him to Rose. Jonathan Hole as 2nd Ornithologist. Carol Locatell as Wife.
8	8	"Ah Love, Could You and I Conspire"	Jerry Bernstein	Richard DeRoy	October 26, 1967
Once a week Sister's Jacqueline and Bertrille go to the water front to buy fish for the convent. They are unaware that a woman, Bobbye Starr (Maureen Arthur), hid in the back of their station wagon. She is the girlfriend of notorious gangster Al Caine (Herb Edelman). Al is on his yacht and is looking for Bobbye. Al's friend Leo (Jack Riley) says he saw a purple station wagon on the dock. At the convent, Jacqueline and Bertrille discover Bobbye, who asks for refuge. Bobbye tells Reverend Mother that she is a secretary. Meanwhile, Al and Leo find the station wagon in town and then see it is driven by nuns. Soon Reverend Mother realises that Bobbye is not a secretary. Al visits the convent and tells Sister Teresa that he is Bobbye's brother. Little Pedro tells Teresa that he recognizes Al and he is a bad man. Bobbye tells Al that if he really loved her, he would get an honest job and marry her. Bobbye confesses to Reverend Mother that she is not a secretary, but she can stay anyway. Bertrille thinks that Al would marry Bobbye if there was another man and he became jealous. Bertrille recruits Carlos to help. Bertrille then does some skywriting that says "Carlos Loves Bobbye" and Al sees it. Pedro is able to prove that Al is a gangster and Bertrille goes to warn Carlos. Al agrees to marry Bobbye once the police become involved.
9	9	"Days of Nuns and Roses"	E. W. Swackhamer	Austin & Irma Kalish	November 2, 1967
The Sisters are having difficulty to obtain donations. Sister Bertrille thinks that the Sisters should go into business for themselves. Sister Ana thinks that Reverend Mother will dislike the idea. The Sisters are having a hard time deciding what business to start. Bertrille thinks they should make a sea grape juice and call it the Nectar of San Tanco. Carlos is speaking with associate Luis Fiero, when Bertrille arrives. Bertrille tells Carlos that she is giving him exclusive distribution rights to a product she may not yet reveal. Carlos is not interested. But when Luis is, Carlos decides to partner with him.. Bertrille wants to buy all of a Farmer's (Martin Garralaga) grape crop. Despite not knowing what they're doing, the Sister's start making the juice. Reverend Mother returns from a trip and wants to know what is happening. After Carlos learns that the Sisters are making sea grape juice, he tells Bertrille there is no market for it. The men who rented all the equipment to the Sisters have come for their money. Bertrille learns they need a license to sell the product. Bertrille is able to stall the men. The sea grape juice has fermented into wine and Carlos is arrested for trying to take some past U.S. Customs. An Inspector (C. Lindsay Workman) thinks the sisters are a smuggling ring. The sisters' problems end when the wine turns into vinegar. Frank Ramírez as Sergeant.
10	10	"With Love from Irving"	E. W. Swackhamer	Dorothy Cooper Foote	November 9, 1967
Sister Bertrille is flying around when she finds a pelican on the beach. It has an injured leg which she bandages up. Bertrille names the bird Irving and she then flies away. Meanwhile, Father Sweeney (Harold Gould) arrives at the convent. Sweeney is there to interview Reverend Mother for the position of dean of women at newly merged collegiate co-ed St. Bernard and St. Boniface. He will be at the convent for a few days. Irving followed Bertrille to the convent and disrupts things. Reverend Mother tells Bertrille to get rid of Irving. Irving does fly away but returns that evening with seashells for Bertrille. Sister Jacqueline thinks Irving is in love with Bertrille, who he sees as another bird. Bertrille tries talking to Irving and asks him to leave. Sweeney sees this and Bertrille is embarrassed. Irving becomes lethargic and refuses to eat or drink. Dr. Leonard, a veterinarian, says that animals can become attached to their humans. Irving will probably die if they cannot pick his spirits up. Reverend Mother suggests finding another pelican for Irving. Dr. Leonard brings several female pelicans for Irving. With a little encouragement from Bertrille, Irving finds a mate and they fly away. Sweeney leaves and will not recommend Reverend Mother. Reverend Mother is not that disappointed as she knows she is needed at the convent.
11	11	"It's an Ill Wind"	Jerry Bernstein	John McGreevey	November 16, 1967
Reverend Mother is to speak at an educational seminar in St. Thomas. Sister Jacqueline discovers that Reverend Mother forgot her speech and other important papers. Bertrille asks Carlos to use his private plane, but he refuses. As a last resort, Bertrille decides to fly there herself. She becomes lost and the wind is dying down. Bertrille lands on a small island. Talc Edwards (Noam Pitlik) and his fellow gangsters, Moon (Arthur Julian), Ben (Larry Vincent), Joe (Lew Palter) and Angie are also on the island. They are trying to figure out how to get rid of the Schwimmer brothers, who are cutting into their profits. Talc sees Bertrille landing and searches for her. When he finds her, Talc thinks she is a saint sent to make him change his ways. The others think Talc is crazy when he introduces Bertrille as a saint and tells them she can fly. Joe and Angie decide to stick with Talc, while Moon and Ben decide to back the Schwimmers. Bertrille accidentally picks up Talc's papers and leaves Reverend Mother's. Hired killer Louie LaRue (Robert F. Lyons) arrives. Moon and Ben fly off with Louie to get the Schwimmers. Later, the wind is strong enough for Bertrille to fly. Joe and Angie now believe Talc. Moon, Ben, Louie and the Schwimmers see Bertrille flying while in their plane. The pilot, stunned, crashes the plane on the island. At the convent, they discover the papers are about Talc's gambling organization. The authorities return Bertrille to the island. Talc and all the other gangsters surrender to Bertrille. William Kendis as Owens.
12	12	"A Young Man with a Cornette"	E. W. Swackhamer	Bernard Slade	November 23, 1967
Dr. Tapia can tell something is bothering Reverend Mother. She agrees to a cruise vacation. Reverend Mother makes Sister Bertrille promise to not tell anyone else about her ability to fly. Later, Bertrille is to meet Sister Jacqueline at a children's hospital. Bertrille encounters Charlie Webster, an orphan who has a habit of telling lies. Dr. Tapia tells Bertrille and Jacqueline that Charlie has been in several different foster homes and has trouble making friends. Bertrille visits Charlie several times and they go kite flying. A strong wind causes Bertrille to go airborne. Back at the hospital, Charlie tells everyone about Bertrille flying, but no one believes him. Bertrille cannot back up his story because of the promise she made to Reverend Mother. Bertrille flies out to the cruise ship to get Reverend Mother's advice. Along the way she sees two men stranded on a raft and tells them she will send help. The men think they have died and are in heaven. On the way back, Bertrille brings the men food and beer. Reverend Mother told Bertrille she should do what she thinks is right with Charlie. The next morning, Bertrille's cornette is missing. At the hospital, Charlie tells the other children that he will be able to fly with the cornette. The children tell Bertrille and Jacqueline that Charlie will attempt to fly from his favorite climbing tree. Bertrille is able to remove Charlie from the tree and says she will tell the others she can fly. Bertrille is surprised when Charlie tells the others he lied when he said he saw Bertrille fly. Dick Wilson as Man #1. Foster Brooks as Passenger.
13	13	"The Patron of Santa Thomasina"	Jerry Bernstein	James S. Henerson	November 30, 1967
Two remote villages have been fighting over which will be called Santa Thomasina. Sister Bertrille and Jacqueline are invited by one of the villages, and not knowing, they wind up at the wrong one. Bertrille tells Francisco that a Pedro Caracol (Julio Medina) come to the convent. Pedro wanted them to visit his village. Francisco tells Bertrille that Pedro's village is a village of bandits. Bertrille wants to go talk to Pedro. Francisco tells Jacqueline that Pedro and his men are raiding the village. They took the statue of Saint Thomasina. When Francisco and the villagers see Bertrille flying, they believe she is Saint Thomasina in the flesh. Francisco wants Bertrille's blessing so his men can go defeat Pedro's men. Bertrille tries to explain that she is not a saint. Later, Bertrille and Jacqueline learn that Francisco and the men have left for battle. They go to try and stop them. After finding Francisco, Bertrille and Jacqueline see Pedro and his men and they are just common villagers. Pedro claims that Francisco's men are the bandits. The two sides start to fight. Bertrille finds a way to bring peace to the villages. They will share the statue and the towns will be called East Santa Thomasina and West Santa Thomasina. Renata Vanni as Maria. Victor Millan as Pablo. Duke Fishman as Villager.
14	14	"If You Want to Fly, Keep Your Coronet Dry"	Jerry Bernstein	Seymour Friedman	December 7, 1967
Reverend Mother permits Sister Bertrille to take her first graders on a trip. Bertrille asks Carlos if he would take the children on a boat ride, but he has plans. Carlos has a friend who owns a plantation and he arranged for the children to have a picnic there. Bertrille and Sister Sixto load the children in the station wagon and drive off. On the way, they get lost. Bertrille eventually finds a different place to have the picnic. At the convent, Sister Jacqueline hears there is an approaching storm. Bertrille and Sixto decide they need to try and find their way back, but the car will not start. Bertrille will fly to a pay phone and call Carlos to get them. The rain stops Bertrille from going far and it starts to get dark. Jacqueline calls Carlos to get the phone number of his friend, Mr. Adams. Jacqueline calls Carlos again to tell him the children did not arrive at the plantation. Carlos is with Paula, but he starts to worry. The children are scared, but Bertrille cheers them up. Carlos is in his plane looking for them. He finds them and radios for help. The children are rescued. His plane then has problem and he is forced to land. The storm is over and Bertrille flies to look for him. She finds him at a different plantation with a beautiful woman named Gina. Song: Sally sings "The Louder I Sing (The Braver I Get)" by Howard Greenfield and Helen Miller.
15	15	"The Dig In"	Jerry Bernstein	Dorothy Cooper Foote	December 14, 1967
Sister Bertrille is out collecting rocks for her children's nature study class. Bertrille wanders into an abandoned mine. A man struggles with her and causes a cave-in. The man tells her that they will die in the mine. After looking around, they find an opening, but it is way up high. The man reveals that his name is Bill Watkins (Henry Jaglom). They throw some rocks up toward the opening to attract someone's attention. A rock falls back down and hits Bill on the head. Bill had some bourbon with him and Bertrille pours some on the wound. Bertrille wants to try to build a ladder. She looks in Bill's duffle bag and discovers he is an escaped convict. He tells her she should be afraid because he will not let her turn him in. Bertrille tries to climb the ladder but it breaks. She cuts her wrist. Bill is able to bandage her wrist as he wanted to be a doctor. He explains how he wound up in jail. Bertrille notices a bit of a draft and tries to fly, but it doesn't work. She tries to tell Bill that she can fly, but he doesn't believe it. Bertrille starts a fire to create an updraft. It works and she flies up to the opening. She gets a rope and Bill climbs out. Bill feels he has been given a second chance. Note: No laugh track.
16	16	"Wailing in a Winter Wonderland"	Jerry Bernstein	Richard De Roy	December 21, 1967
The sisters are drawing names for who they are to give a Christmas gift to. Elderly nun, Sister Olaf (Celia Lovsky), had recently come to Convent San Tanco from Puerto Rico. Olaf had hoped to return to Norway for Christmas, but the doctor said she is too weak for the trip. Olaf tells Sister Bertrille and Reverend Mother that she wished to see a white Christmas. Bertrille picks Olaf's name in the drawing and she wants to make it snow for her. She asks Sisters Jacqueline and Sixto to help her. Bertrille talks to a Weatherman (Woodrow Parfrey) about how to make it snow. He tells her one could seed the clouds with dry ice pellets. Bertrille gets the ice from Carlos and sneaks it into the convent. Bertrille then flies and seeds the clouds. It does snow over the convent and Olaf is pleased. A problem arises when the winds shift and Bertrille causes it to snow over San Juan. The hotels are emptying and the airports are packed with tourists wanting to go home. Olaf thanks Bertrille for making her happy. Carlos and some other hotel owners ask the weatherman how it could have snowed. The weatherman mentions Bertrille asked about snow. Bertrille tells Reverend Mother that Carlos raised much money for the small businesses. Reverend Mother tells her that the people will not want charity. Bertrille decides to fly and toss the money around. The tourists and small businesses are happy. Songs: "I'm So Glad I Can Fly" by Carole Bayer Sager and George Fischoff and Deck the Halls.
17	17	"With a Friend Like Him, Who Needs?"	Russell B. Mayberry	Phyllis White & Robert White	December 28, 1967
Reverend Mother wants to bring in a qualified librarian to organize the convent's library. She learns from the Bishop that the only person available is accident-prone Brother Paul Leonardi (Rich Little). Reverend Mother will have Sister Bertrille assist him. When Sister Jacqueline questions that decision, Reverend Mother says that she hopes "two wrongs will make a right". Brother Paul arrives and Bertrille shows him the library. Reverend Mother leaves for a conference and anticipates seeing the library when she returns. Paul starts to separate the books into those they will keep and those to discard. Bertrille starts painting. While trying to remove a nail from the wall, Paul creates a large hole. In the hole Paul finds several old parchments. He believes them to be priceless San Tanco scrolls. They then learn that the book shelves that Paul placed outside, all burned because he left a magnifying glass on them. Before going outside, Paul absentmindedly places the parchments in one of the books that are to be discarded. To get new bookshelves, Bertrille has "Swapping Salvador" (Peter Mamakos) visit. She has him trade the books they were to discard for the shelves. Bertrille and Paul realise that the parchments are gone with the books. They learn that Salvador will grind the books into pulp. Bertrille flies to Salvador just in time to save the parchments. Reverend Mother returns to find a beautifully organized library. Because of his discovery of the scrolls, Paul is asked to work at the Vatican library.
18	18	"Tonio's Mother"	Don Taylor	Story by : Albert Mannheimer & Krishna Shah and John McGreevey; Teleplay by : John McGreevey	January 4, 1968
In the town of Esperanza, widower Luis Armejo (Nico Minardos) is to marry Manuela Garcia (Arlene Martel). Everyone in town is excited for them, including Luis' son, Tonio. Tonio is out picking flowers and he sees Sister Bertrille flying. When Bertrille lands, Tonio gives her the flowers. He thinks that she is his late mother returning from heaven. Tonio tells his father. Tonio shows Manuela a picture of his mother. Bertrille is a spitting image of her. Tonio takes Luis and Manuela to where he saw Bertrille, but she is no longer there. Meanwhile, Bertrille visits the town's Father Dominic (Frank Puglia) to return an item of his. Back in town, Tonio fights with two other boys and Bertrille breaks it up. Tonio takes her to his house and shows her a picture of his mother. Father Dominic, Luis and Manuela come home and see Bertrille singing to a sleeping Tonio. Manuela wants to delay the wedding until they learn who Bertrille really is. Tonio returns all the wedding gifts. Bertrille stops Manuela from leaving town. Bertrille tells Tonio that she has to leave. She came to make sure that he had someone to love him and take care of him. And that someone is Manuela. Manuela sees Bertrille fly away. Manuela finds Tonio and he calls her "Mama". E. J. André as Diogenes. Nacho Galindo as Plato.
19	19	"A Fish Story"	Richard Kinon	John McGreevey	January 11, 1968
The convent needs some fish for a special meal. Sister Sixto has an uncle, Gus Mendoza (David Hurst), who is a local fisherman. Unfortunately, Gus hasn't had much luck catching anything lately. He does not tell Sixto and Sister Bertrille. He gets a fish from Lily's Fish Shack, which is owned by Lily Romano (Norma Crane). The sisters later learn where Gus got the fish. Sixto learns from her family that the large fishing companies have better technology and catch huge amounts of fish. Sixto and Sister Jacqueline talk Bertrille into locating schools of fish by seeing them from the air. Meanwhile, Mr. Ogden (Michael Fox), from the bank, comes to see Lily. He threatens to close the store as Lily is behind in payments. Ogden gives her two weeks. Gus owes Lily $600 and she wants him to sell the boat and repay her. Bertrille takes Gus to fish. Because of the sun, Gus cannot tell it is Bertrille and he thinks it is a patron saint. Soon Gus pays off Lily. Reverend Mother learns of Bertrille's fish spotting and makes her stop. Despite the money Gus gave her, Lily still owes money to the bank. After something that Reverend Mother says, Bertrille talks to Gus. Gus gives the title to his boat to Ogden to clear Lily's debt. He then goes into business with Lily. Nick Cravat as Gil.
20	20	"The Hot Spell"	Mack Bing	James S. Henerson	January 18, 1968
There is a heat wave hitting San Juan. Sister Bertrille arrives with several old air conditioners from Carlos' casino. He had installed new ones. Reverend Mother reluctantly accepts them. Carlos' assistant Pedro learns that gangster Rufus Morgan (Bruce Gordon) has arrived in town. Pedro tells Carlos that Rufus wants the casino. Bertrille visits to thank Carlos. Carlos comes up with the idea to temporarily deed the casino to the convent while Morgan is in town. Two of Morgan's men, Burt Remick (Peter Leeds) and Martin (Stanley Beck) come to see Reverend Mother. They tell her that they are interested in taking over the casino. Bertrille finds a way to make them leave. At the casino, Pedro tells Morgan that Carlos left the island. Carlos is actually just in hiding. Morgan demands to see one of the owners and Bertrille visits. Bertrille is talked into playing poker with Morgan, who hopes to win the casino. But Bertrille wins big. Morgan learns that Carlos is on the island. Morgan, who is superstitious, changes his mind about the casino and Carlos when he sees Bertrille flying over his yacht. He thinks she is a bad omen and leaves San Juan. Susan Howard as Sister Teresa. Julie Gregg as Doris Finch.
21	21	"My Sister, the Sister"	John Erman	Bernard Slade	January 25, 1968
Sister Bertrille informs Reverend Mother that her sister, Dr. Jennifer Ethrington (Elinor Donahue) will be visiting for a couple days. Jennifer is on her way to Brazil to work in some villages. Bertrille also reveals that her real name is Elsie Ethrington. Bertrille hopes that Jennifer will not be bored at the convent. Meanwhile, Jennifer is sitting next to Carlos on the airplane. Carlos asks her out for that evening, but Jennifer says she has to visit her sister Elsie first. After arriving at the convent, Jennifer tells Bertrille about the handsome man she met on the plane. When Bertrille learns that it is Carlos that Jennifer is going out with, she worries. Bertrille visits Carlos and he learns that Jennifer is Bertrille's sister. When Bertrille tells Jennifer what a womanizer Carlos is, she says that she is old enough to handle herself. Reverend Mother asks Bertrille if Jennifer could go to a remote village to take care of someone who has been bitten by a rabid dog. On his yacht, Carlos proposes to Jennifer. She says that she is committed to the Peace Corps for a couple years. It takes some doing, but Carlos, Bertrille and Jennifer arrive at the village. Carlos faints when Jennifer gives the man an injection. Later, Carlos sits on some broken glass. He is embarrassed when Jennifer has to stitch him up. Jennifer rejects Carlos' proposal and he blames Bertrille. Jennifer tells Carlos that Bertrille had nothing to do with her decision and they clear the air. Having Bertrille as a sister-in-law could also be a problem for Carlos.
22	22	"Sister Lucky"	John Erman	Gene Thompson	February 1, 1968
Sister Bertrille is trying to collect money for the poor. She encounters some men gambling down at the docks. When Juan (Michael Constantine) starts a winning streak, he names Bertrille "Sister Lucky". He wins so much, he donates some to Bertrille. Reverend Mother insists that Bertrille return the money, because of how it was obtained. She reminds Bertrille that Bishop Parnell (Booth Colman) will be coming for a visit. Juan will not accept the money and Bertrille tries to explain that she is not a lucky charm. Bertrille starts an impromptu craps game, but instead of losing, Juan wins big. A policemen raids the game and Bertrille and the gamblers are arrested. Meanwhile, Bishop Parnell arrives and he has a message from Bertrille's aunt and uncle. Carlos goes to the jail and tells Captain Dominic Lopez (Vito Scotti) that he should not be holding a nun. Lopez explains that she is free to go, but she refuses. Bertrille convinces Carlos, a professional gambler, to play against Juan, to show him that she is not a lucky charm. Juan wins anyway. Sister Jacqueline calls the jail and tells Bertrille that Bishop Parnell wants to see her. Bertrille flies to the convent and while she is gone, Juan loses. Bertrille returns to the jail and Juan still loses, proving she is not lucky. Bertrille suggests that Juan work at the casino to pay off his debt. Jamie Farr as Manuel.
23	23	"The Sister and the Old Salt"	Richard Kinon	Bernard Slade	February 8, 1968
Sister Bertrille and the children of the convent meet Captain Otis Barnaby (J. Patrick O'Malley) by the docks. They help him fix up his small boat. Otis tells Bertrille that he wants to sail from San Juan to Miami. For the next several days Otis visits the convent and tells the children about his travels. Otis shows Bertrille a radio he will use to keep in touch with her and the children during his trip. One day Conrad Barnaby (Jonathan Daly), Otis' son, comes to see Bertrille. He would like her to talk Otis out of the trip. Conrad tells her, that despite all his tall tales, his father has never sailed a boat. He was an insurance salesman in Lincoln, Nebraska. Bertrille goes to talk to Otis, but he will still make the trip. Everyone is surprised that Conrad does not come to see his father off. Conrad arrives as Otis sails off. Soon, a storm hits the area. Otis radios Bertrille and says that although he has lost his supplies and there is some damage to the ship, he will continue. When the radio dies, Bertrille decides to search for Otis. She finds the boat and drops off some supplies. When Otis sees Bertrille, he thinks she is a figment of his imagination. He is able to fix the radio with parts that Bertrille brought. Otis radios and tell Conrad about the vision. Conrad thinks his father has lost his mind and dispatches the Coast Guard. Bertrille proves to Conrad that she can fly and he calls off the search. Otis finishes his trip and returns.
24	24	"Cyrano de Bertrille"	Stan Schwimmer	Paul Wayne	February 22, 1968
Pedro Alvarez (Albert Paulsen) and Juan Cortez run a produce business. Pedro asks Sister Bertrille to read a letter from Ethel Tarnower, his girlfriend in Miami. Pedro tells Bertrille that he never learned to read or write and she says he should learn. One day he shows up at her kindergarten class. Reverend Mother tells Bertrille that Pedro has to go before Bishop Pool's arrival. Bertrille says that if Pedro stays, that might help convince Bishop Pool there is a need for an adult English class. Juan wants Pedro to return to work, but he remains in school. Juan becomes frustrated when learning is difficult. After a month and Pedro tells Bertrille he is quitting. Pedro receives another letter from Ethel saying she will be visit San Juan in a month. He decides to stay in class to be able to read to her. Bishop Pool arrives and Pedro reads him something. Bishop Pool is impressed until he learns that Pedro memorized what he read. Bishop Pool will return in a month and Pedro must improve and he does. But he thinks the pressure is getting to him when he sees Bertrille flying. Pedro receives a letter from Ethel that he reads to Bertrille. They are shocked when it says Ethel is marrying another man. The next time Bishop Pool arrives, Pedro tells him that reading and writing have provided him many benefits. He also says that after reading the business books, he learned that Juan has been cheating him for the past fifteen years.
25	25	"The Reconversion of Sister Shapiro"	Jerry Bernstein	Austin Kalish & Irma Kalish	February 29, 1968
Carlos encounters Sister Bertrille at the airport. She flew in from a seminar in New Orleans. Carlos is there to meet Linda Shapiro (Pamelyn Ferdin), his adopted niece. Linda's parents had planned to vacation here, but unexpectedly had to go to Chicago. When Carlos learns he has to leave on a business trip for a few days, Bertrille offers to look after her. Reverend Mother is concerned as Linda is Jewish. Because she does not know the other children, Bertrille asks Linda to be her assistant. Linda finds a little bird that fell out of its nest. Bertrille flies the bird back to the nest and has Linda promise to not tell anyone. Carlos comes to pick up Linda and she is wearing a nun's habit. She wants to be a nun and be called Sister Shapiro. Reverend Mother tries to tell Linda she cannot become a nun because she is too young. Linda's parents, Mr. (Laurence Haddon) and Mrs. Shapiro arrive. Linda tells them she wants to be just like Sister Bertrille. Something Bertrille says makes Linda think that she does not really like her. Linda is sad and no longer wants to be a nun. Bertrille finds a way to make Linda feel better and realize that she should have fun growing up. Spencer Chan as Waiter. Song: "The Ballad of Chopsticks" by Helen Miller and Howard Greenfield Note: The home movies of Sister Bertrille's pre-nun-life as Elsie Ethrington are clips from Sally Field's previous series, Gidget.
26	26	"Where There's a Will"	Stan Schwimmer	Story by : Searle Kramer; Teleplay by : John McGreevey	March 14, 1968
Mr. Prin, a wealthy man, has left something to the convent in his will. Mr. Bragen (Regis Cordic), who is handling the estate, tells the nuns that there were many debts and taxes. Only a contract of a prize fighter, Mike Sever (Ron Masak), known as the Buffalo Buzzsaw, remains. Reverend Mother says that Mike cannot stay at the convent, but he says he has nowhere else to go and has no money. Reverend Mother will let him temporarily stay in the gardener's cottage. Mike does things around the convent, is good with the children and is a great cook. Sister Bertrille visits Carlos. Carlos learns that Mike has not fought in two years. Carlos suggests selling Mike's contract, if they can. Mike tells Bertrille that he likes it at the convent. Carlos agrees to help train Mike. While running with Mike, Bertrille is caught in a breeze and Mike sees her flying. Carlos reluctantly spars with Mike. Carlos arranges a bout for Mike and hopes a manager will see him and buy his contract. Mike learns of this and leaves. Bertrille finds Mike and says he is tired of being sold back and forth. He hates fighting and dislikes hurting other. Mike decides to fight to help the convent and he knocks out the other boxer. He receives offers for his contract. But Mike prefers to be a chef in Carlos' restaurant.
27	27	"The Puce Alert"	John Erman	Richard De Roy	March 21, 1968
Carlos is called up for his two-week Marine Corps reserve duty. He is stationed on a small island near San Juan. Carlos sneaked Ginger on the island with his yacht. They are having cocktails when Capt. Daniel J. Dolger (John Dehner) catches them. Dolger wants to have him court-martialed. Carlos learns from a guard that Dolger and the Reverend Mother are cousins. Before Ginger is sent away, Carlos tells her to tell Sister Bertrille about his problem. Bertrille talks to Reverend Mother and once she learns of Dolger, Reverend Mother tries to call him. When Reverend Mother cannot reach Dolger, because the Marines are on red alert, she tells Bertrille to fly over there. Despite some problems, Bertrille reaches Carlos. Dolger catches them and thinks that Carlos dressed up one of his girlfriends as a nun. Bertrille tries to explain that she flew over. Dolger thinks Carlos and Bertrille are the war games enemy and interrogates them. Dolger finally visits Reverend Mother, who confirms Bertrille is a nun and can fly. Back on the island, Dolger asks Bertrille to fly, but there is no wind. Dolger sees approaching ships and the war games begin. Later, Bertrille manages to fly and sees that the ships are decoys. Carlos tells Dolger about the decoys and that the real enemy ships are coming on the other side of the island. Dolger finally sees Bertrille flying and now believes Carlos. Dolger's team wins the manueuvers. Hal England as Lt. Willis.
28	28	"May the Wind Be Always at Your Back"	Jerry Bernstein	Al Beich	March 28, 1968
Teenage Bridgett Faulkner (Cindy Cassell) and Joel Bascomb (Craig Huxley) won the contest as the top students at the convent. The prize is a day out on the town and dinner at the Captains Table, donated by Carlos. Bridgett tells Joel that she does not want to accept the prize because Sister Bertrille made Carlos do it. Bridgett tells Reverend Mother that she does not want to take time away from her studies. Joel then also turns down the prize. Bertrille convinces the children to go. At dinner, Bridgett reluctantly dances with Carlos. Bridgett feels she is not attractive. Joel is a little jealous as he likes Bridgett. Bridgett starts to fall for Carlos. Back at the convent, Bridgett spends time making herself look prettier and older. Joel tells Bertrille that he worries because Bridgett has been neglecting her studies and may lose her scholarship. Sister Jacqueline and Bertrille find a picture of Carlos in Bridgett's room and see that she is missing. At the casino, Bridgett asks the Head Waiter (Julio Medina) to give Carlos a present. Bertrille tells Carlos that he needs to talk to Bridgett about their age difference. Bridgett is hurt when she sees Carlos with a girlfriend, Candy Cain (Maura McGiveney). Bertrille convinces Joel to tell Bridgett how much he cares for her. Bridgett feels much better. Geoffrey Deuel as Waiter.
29	29	"Love Me, Love My Dog"	Russ Mayberry	Story by : Ted Sherdeman & Jane Klove; Teleplay by : John McGreevey	April 4, 1968
Janus Zayukovsky (Neil Burstyn), a Gypsy, has abandoned his thieving ways. But his dog Raffles hasn not and steals a woman's purse. Janus is imprisoned. Sisters Bertrille and Jacqueline are out with the children when they come across Raffles. Raffles seems to like shy boy Jamie. They bring the dog to the convent, despite a no pets rule. Reverend Mother agrees to let Raffles temporarily stay to help Jamie overcome his shyness. Bertrille, Jamie and Raffles bring Carlos a present. They discover that Raffles took Carlos' wallet. Raffles continues to steal. While Bertrille and Jacqueline are placing an ad in the paper, Raffles leaves the car and steals several purses. They get a flat tire. A policeman changes their tire and Raffles puts all the purses in his squad car. Reverend Mother says that if the owner does not show up in a couple days, Raffles must go to the pound. In the meantime, the sisters try to teach Raffles to stop stealing. Monsignor Houk visits the convent and Raffles takes his wallet. Janus has been released from jail. He sees the ad in the paper and goes to the convent. Jamie has taken Raffles away so he avoids the pound, but Bertrille finds them. Janus and Raffles are reunited. Frank Ramirez as Peralta.
30	30	"You Can't Get There from Here"	Bruce Kessler	Cordwainer Bird (aka Harlan Ellison)	April 11, 1968
As Sister Bertrille flies, the wind stops and she crash lands on a remote island. Her cornette lands in the water and is torn, stranding her. Suddenly, Bertrille sees Carlos. Carlos explains that he was on his yacht with his date, April Chance (Bridget Hanley). He flirted, so April pushed him off the yacht and sailed off. Carlos flashes back to when he got in trouble with Bobbye Starr (Maureen Arthur archive footage) and Albion 'Al' Caine (Herb Edelman archive footage). Carlos is angry with April. They make a fire and catch some fish. Carlos flashes back to when he was in an airplane with a girl and Bertrille flies by. He then flashes back to when Bertrille interrupted him and Diane (E. J. Peaker archive footage) twice. Back to reality, Bertrille says they need to find fresh water. Bertrille trips over someone covered in seaweed. It is April, who tells Bertrille that she sank the yacht she was on. Bertrille does not tell April about Carlos. Carlos thinks he has repaired Bertrille's cornette and she does not tell him about April. Carlos finds April and Bertrille and learns his yacht has sunk. Carlos and April chase each other, then Bertrille steps in quicksand. They collaborate to extract Bertrille and they then make up. Bertrille is able to fly away and get help.

=== Season 2 (1968–69) ===
No. overall	No. in season	Title	Directed by	Written by	Original release date
32	1	"Song of Bertrille"	Murray Golden	Michael Morris	September 26, 1968
Sister Bertrille learns that the rock group, Sonny and The Sundowners are appearing at Carlos' casino. Bertrille used to go to school with Sonny Howard (Paul Petersen). Bertrille goes to see Sonny at the casino. Sonny is happy to see her, but he is surprised that Elsie Ethrington is a nun. Sonny introduces her to the band and tells them about how he and Bertrille once performed together. Bertrille tells Sonny of the convent's need for money. He suggests that she write a song for the group. She would get royalty money for the song which she could give to the convent. The sisters decide to not tell Reverend Mother about Bertrille writing the song. Bertrille is having difficulty songwriting. Sister Jacqueline suggests that she go flying for a while. It inspires her and she comes up with a song. Sonny likes it and says they will just punch it up a little. Reverend Mother learns about the song from Carlos and she will go with the other sisters to hear Sonny perform it. At the casino, Carlos introduces the band's manager, Manny Julian (Jerry Hausner), to the sisters. The band has changed the song into a psychedelic rock song. Reverend Mother is unhappy and Bertrille is disappointed. The next day, Carlos, Sonny and Manny visit the convent. Bertrille declines the advance check. Bertrille performs the song the way it was meant to be. Manny likes it better and says he has another client, the Salt Lake City Boys Choir, that could perform it that way. Song: "A Whole New World" by Jack Keller and Bob Russell. Note: Flying over breathtaking landscapes, Sister Bertrille is inspired to write her song, "A Whole New World." By coincidence, the Oscar-winning song in 1992's Aladdin has a similar airborne theme with the same title but completely different music and lyrics.
33	2	"The Crooked Convent"	Hal Cooper	Arthur Julian	October 3, 1968
At the convent's church bazaar, the sisters meet the new police captain (Vito Scotti in his debut as the accident-prone Captain Gaspar Fomento). Carlos has donated several items to the bazaar. Gaspar finds it interesting that Carlos buys one raffle ticket and wins a TV. Gaspar begins to believe that Carlos and the convent are running an illegal gambling ring. When Sister Bertrille returns the money he lost on the raffle to Gaspar, he considers it a bribe. Chief Galindo (Don Diamond) threatens to fire Gaspar if he continues with these notions. Gaspar would like gardener Nacio (Frank Ramirez) to spy on the convent. At the convent, Reverend Mother mentions to Nacio that he receives many phone calls. Soon, Sisters Jacqueline and Bertrille realize that Nacio is a bookie and is taking bets at the convent. Gaspar overhears the two discussing Nacio betting on the horses and thinks that they are betting. Bertrille goes to the race track to warn Nacio that Gaspar has been hanging around the convent. Jacqueline is familiar with horse racing and Bertrille tells Nacio a horse she picked. When Nacio sees Bertrille fly, he decides to bet on that horse. Chief Galindo becomes upset when Gaspar arrests Jacqueline and Bertrille. Gaspar also has Carlos arrested. Carlos informs Gaspar that it is Nacio placing bets and that earlier he did so from the police station. Chief Galindo confiscates Gaspar's badge. Nacio leaves San Juan, but he has Carlos give Reverend Mother the $500 he won.
34	3	"The Rabbi and the Nun"	Jerry Bernstein	Michael Morris	October 10, 1968
Sister Bertrille received, among other things, a menorah from her deceased aunt. She decides to give it to Rabbi Mendez (Harold Gould). He is in charge of Temple Beth Sholom, a synagogue. Alfredo Acquilar (Edmund Hashim) arrives and introduces his fiancée, Sophia Baldazon. Sophia is Carlos' bookkeeper. After they leave, Mendez mentions to Bertrille that hopefully because he is getting married, Alfredo will give up his gambling. Mendez says the temple is too small for all the guests for the wedding. Bertrille convinces everyone to have the wedding at the convent. Mendez tells Bertrille that the wedding is off as Alfredo lost his honeymoon money at Carlos' casino. Carlos reluctantly agrees to Bertrille's plan to let Alfredo win the money back with loaded dice. Mendez and Bertrille convince Alfredo to gamble again. Alfredo wins his $300 back, but then doesn't stop. Capt. Gaspar Fomento arrives, discovers the loaded dice and arrests Carlos. After talking to Mendez, Gaspar releases Carlos. Alfredo and Sophia are married. The sisters lead a rousing rendition of Hava Nagila during the celebration. Bertrille tells Carlos that Alfredo lost all the money at another casino. She talks Carlos into letting the couple use his yacht. Lillian Adams as Grandma.
35	4	"The Return of Father Lundigan"	Jerry Bernstein	Stan Dreben & Lee Erwin	October 17, 1968
Sister Bertrille has a toothache. Sister Jacqueline recommends she visit Dr. G. Paredes (Bernie Kopell), a dentist. Bertrille, however, is afraid of dentists. Meanwhile, church psychologist Father Lundigan (Paul Lynde previously portrayed by John Astin) arrives at the convent. Reverend Mother accompanies Bertrille to see Dr. Paredes. They meet Carlos there. To calm Bertrille, Paredes hypnotizes her. Reverend Mother is accidentally hypnotized as well. After a comment from Carlos, Paredes gives them a post-hypnotic suggestion. Every time they hear the word "red", Bertrille will act like the Reverend Mother and the Reverend Mother will act like Bertrille. Paredes has to rush off as his wife is having a baby and forgets to remove the post-hypnotic suggestion. Father Lundigan tells Jacqueline that he had a year of therapy because he thought he saw Bertrille fly. In his conversation with Reverend Mother and Bertrille, Father Lundigan says the word red. They start to act like the other and Reverend Mother tries to fly. Lundigan thinks the two are going crazy and wants to send a report to the Bishop. Jacqueline notices Reverend Mother and Bertrille's odd behavior and goes to talk to Lundigan. Just as Lundigan leaves, Paredes arrives and removes the post-hypnotic suggestion. Hoping to prevent Lundigan from filing his report, Bertrille has to prove that she can fly. Bertrille flies by Lundigan's plane. He sees her and believes he will have to go into therapy again. Sid Haig as Señor Quesada.
36	5	"The Convent Is Condemned"	Murray Golden	Arthur Julian	October 24, 1968
The convent is holding their old clothes drive. Captain Fomento arrives and tells the sisters they lack a permit. Meanwhile, the mayor of San Filipe offers to build a new casino if Carlos moves his business there. Carlos declines. Fomento tells Sister Bertrille that he is considering resigning. He gave his brother-in-law, Chief Galindo, a ticket for littering. Fomento also says that little else happens in this town. To stop him from leaving, Bertrille tells him that ashtrays have been stolen from Carlos' casino. When Fomento starts arresting some of the casino customers, Carlos decides to move his business. Bertrille wants to formulate a plan to keep Carlos, a friend and benefactor to the convent, from leaving. The sisters have Fomento condemn the convent. Bertrille tells Carlos what happened, but he sees through the scheme. Carlos is touched and decides to stay. They now have to stop Fomento from condemning the convent. They tell Fomento that Carlos bought the convent and will turn it into a casino. Fomento considers that sacrilegious. He declares the convent a national historical monument which would be exempt from building code requirements.
37	6	"The Organ Transplant"	Jerome Courtland	Larry Markes	November 7, 1968
The convent's organ is falling apart. While flying around, Sister Bertrille sees a pipe organ at an outdoor auction. Bertrille obtains the organ for free. Meanwhile, Carlos refuses to audition Manuel's (Joseph Bernard) step-niece by marriage for his nightclub show. But then he sees beautiful Felicia Fiero (Abbe Lane). Carlos has to run off to help Bertrille move the organ to the convent. Carlos wants to return to Felicia, but he assembles the organ instead. Reverend Mother is surprised how old and garish it is. It also has trouble functioning. Bertrille just thinks it needs a little breaking in. Bertrille suggests using a vacuum cleaner to make the organ's pumps work. They learn that the organ shatters glass when it hits high C. When the note shatters Reverend Mother's glasses, she wants the organ taken to a junk yard. Carlos has been spending a couple days with Felicia, but has yet to audition her. She wants to sing for him, but Bertrille calls Carlos and asks him to move the organ. Felicia follows Carlos to the convent. She plays the organ and sings for him. Felicia displays much talent and Carlos wants the organ. Song: Abbe sings "The Look of Love".
38	7	"Two Bad Eggs"	E. W. Swackhamer	Bruce Howard	November 14, 1968
Condorillo hawks are outlawed in Puerto Rico because they eat the sugar cane plants. Sister Bertrille sees two hawk eggs and decides to rescue them. Fred (Del Moore), a tourist, sees Bertrille flying as he drives. His wife Millie does not believe him. Fred searches for Bertrille and sees her talking to the eggs. He tells Millie that Bertrille is an invader from outer space. Meanwhile, Carlos is panicking because Margo Richmond thinks they're getting married. Carlos wants to hide at the convent. Reverend Mother will allow him to stay if he does some gardening. Sister Sixto confesses to Reverend Mother about the eggs, which have hatched. Instead of gardening, Carlos is teaching the boys Blackjack. Fred tells Capt. Fomento about the alien invaders dressed as nuns. Fomento realizes the nun is Bertrille and she has hawk eggs. Margo arrives at the convent and Reverend Mother takes her to find Carlos. Margo visits to give Carlos a gift and tell him that she will get married. Things become confusing when Carlos tries to drive away and Fomento, Fred and Millie arrive. Bertrille flies off with the chicks. She gives them to a Zoo Man (Lew Palter), who is startled by Bertrille flying.
39	8	"All Alone by the Convent Phone"	Jerry Bernstein	Michael Morris	November 21, 1968
Everyone from the convent is at a charity event. Sister Bertrille is the only nun there as she is nursing sick little Felix. Bertrille hears on the radio that fugitive bank robber Ignacio Ferrante (Cliff Osmond) is in the area. Capt. Fomento arrives and startles Bertrille. Fomento tells her that Ferrante has a mustache and is dangerous. Bertrille tries to get Fomento to stay, but he has to leave. Ferrante's car breaks down near the convent. Not knowing that Ferrante had shaved off his mustache, Bertrille lets him in. When he is surprised by Felix, Ferrante pulls out his gun. Now that Bertrille knows who he really is, Ferrante cannot leave because she will call the police. Fomento returns and Ferrante dresses up as a nun. Bertrille introduces him as Mother General, who has taken a vow of silence. Ferrante tricks Fomento into giving him his gun. Ferrante is stunned when he sees Bertrille flying and he drops the gun. Fomento captures him. Later, Fomento faints when he realizes he actually stood up to Ferrante. Note: A unique episode in that Sister Bertrille is the only nun who appears.
40	9	"It's an Ill Windfall"	Jerry Bernstein	Searle Kramer	November 28, 1968
Reverend Mother shows the sisters a check for $5000. It was donated by a Juan Hernando. He was an orphan at the convent before Reverend Mother's time. The check is destroyed. Sister Bertrille thinks she found the orphan Juan. But she really found "Honest" Juan Hernando, a crooked politician who is running for mayor in a nearby town. Bertrille mentions the check, but Juan misunderstands and thinks the convent is donating $5000 to his campaign. Juan starts telling everyone that the sisters are supporting him. Juan learns that the sisters want a check from him. He still wants their support so he stalls for time. Juan figures that after he is elected, he can give public funds to the convent. The real Juan Hernando comes to see Reverend Mother. She then gets a call from the Bishop (Francis DeSales). He tells her there's a story in the paper about the convent supporting a politician. He says the man is crooked. So Reverend Mother thinks the real Juan is the crooked politician. She confronts him and refuses his check. Reverend Mother learns from Bertrille that the man she confronted was the real Juan. They explain the situation to the real Juan. He gives them a check for $100, because the other money was dubiously earned. The sisters then get "Honest" Juan to actually be honest with his constituents. Larry Gelman as Man #1. John Goddard as Man #2.
41	10	"Slightly Hot Parking Meters"	Claudio Guzmán	Elroy Schwartz	December 12, 1968
Cpt. Fomento had parking meters installed in town. He also impounds the convent's station wagon as it has no headlights. Chief Galindo asks Fomento why the meters produce no revenue. Clearly someone is stealing the money. Fomento plants some marked coins in the meters, hoping to catch the thieves. Sister Bertrille flies to an auto junkyard, seeking headlights for the convent's car. Meanwhile, the two men who sold Fomento the meters kept a set of keys and loot the meters. They sell some worn out meters to Mr. Montoya (Rodolfo Hoyos Jr.), the owner of the junkyard. Through that transaction and then Bertrille buying some headlights, she obtains marked coins. Bertrille gives Fomento the headlights and because there was a phone call made, Bertrille gives him a marked coin. Fomento wants Sgt. Salazar (Michael Pataki) to follow her. As the two men are empty a meter, Bertrille frightens them away. Salazar sees her by the empty meter. Bertrille flies after the two men. The men go to Carlo's casino. Galindo tries to sell the meters back to the men. Fomento arrives and tells Galindo that Bertrille is the thief. Bertrille arrives and says the two men are the thieves. Rico Alaniz as Dominick.
42	11	"To Fly or Not to Fly"	John Erman	John McGreevey	December 19, 1968
Reverend Mother tells the sister novices that in four weeks it will be their re-dedication ceremony. Reverend Mother will soon attend a conference in Chicago and she may bring along one companion. Some of the sisters do extra things for her to get on her good side. Reverend Mother tells Sister Bertrille that because she attended school there, she is a good choice. But because Chicago is the "Windy City", it would be too risky to take her. Bertrille tells Carlos that the re-dedication ceremony will be led by the visiting Mother General (Spring Byington). Bertrille asks Carlos if he knows an aeronautical engineer who can help her to not fly during the time. They visit George Bragan (C. Lindsay Workman). Without telling him whom they are discussing, they learn the aircraft just needs to add five pounds. Bertrille goes on an eating binge. After two weeks, Bertrille gains only three and a half pounds. Reverend Mother returns from Chicago. With Mother General arriving that afternoon, Bertrille tries lead boots. Despite it being windy, Reverend Mother tells Bertrille to remove the weights. During the ceremony the sisters try to restrain Bertille with rope. With Reverend Mother's help, Bertrille gets through the ceremony. Later, Reverend Mother tells Bertille she has a special talent and should use it wisely and discreetly. Note: The episode concludes with a two-minute flying sequence.
43	12	"How to Be a Spanish Grandmother"	Jerry Bernstein	Story by : Ed Jurist & Michael Morris; Teleplay by : John McGreevey	December 26, 1968
Sister Bertrille learns that Carlos is looking for a temporary wife. Carlos' grandmother, Amalia Ramirez (Lillian Adams), is coming for a visit. Several years ago Amalia was apparently dying. To make her happy, Carlos told her he was married and had children. She will only be in town for a day. Carlos is worried that if he tells her the truth, her weak heart might give out. Carlos thinks of Bertrille's sister Dr. Jennifer Ethrington (Elinor Donahue). Amalia arrives and Carlos tells her the family is on vacation. She sees the picture of Jennifer on Carlos' desk. Amalia says she will stay in town until the family returns. Carlos gets Jennifer to come to San Juan under the pretense that Bertrille is sick. Jennifer arrives with her fiancé Paul Martinson. Amalia sees Jennifer. Jennifer now has to play along and they get two children from the convent. Later, Amalia sees Jennifer kissing Paul and then she sees Carlos kissing a girlfriend, Lisa. Worrying about a broken marriage, Amalia plans to take the children to Argentina with her. Bertrille flies to the airport and tells Amalia the truth. Amalia is actually touched that Carlos would go to that trouble to make her happy.
44	13	"The Landlord Cometh"	Oscar Rudolph	Frank Crow & Searle Kramer	January 2, 1969
The convent's 99-year lease with the De Cordova family is up for renewal. Señor Moreno (Ivor Francis), from the bank, tells Reverend Mother that Fabio De Cordova (Jay Novello) does not want to renew the lease. Fabio is giving the sisters three weeks to vacate the convent. The sisters decide to invite Fabio to visit the convent and see the good things they do. Capt. Fomento finds it odd that after 396 years, the De Cordova family decides to not renew. Fabio arrives and the sisters learn that the De Cordova fortune is all but gone. All that is left is the convent. Fabio tells Sister Bertrille that at his age, he does not want wealth, just a place to live. Bertrille suggests that he stay at the convent's grounds keeper's cottage. Fabio agrees to stay, but will not sign the lease just yet in case things do not work out. Fabio is demanding and meddlesome. Fomento mistakenly believes that Fabio is an impostor. Reverend Mother has had enough when Fabio leads guided tours of the convent. She decides the sisters will leave. Fabio leaves and says it is because he thinks Fomento knows he previously committed a crime. He says he is deeding the convent to the church, but forgets to sign the deed. Bertrille finds Fabio and he signs the deed. He tells her that he once embezzled money from a former lover. He wants to find her and make things right.
45	14	"Sisters Socko in San Tanco"	R. Robert Rosenbaum	Bernard Slade	January 16, 1969
Sister Bertrille's student Michael Antonio (Manuel Padilla Jr.) is fond of magic tricks. Michael's uncle, Marko the Magnificent (Victor Buono), is a famous magician. Marko is coming to visit Michael. A water pipe in the convent bursts. To raise money for repairs, Bertrille would like to hold a charity show featuring Marko. Marko arrives and tells Bertrille he came to rest and does not want to perform. Michael tells Marko that they have already made preparations and sold tickets. Marko says he will not perform without supporting acts. Bertrille tries to find some talent among the sisters. They decide on the children's choir and a trio of singing nuns, Sisters Bertrille, Jacqueline and Ana. Marko is practicing some tricks and is having trouble. Marko confesses to Bertrille that he hasn't performed in over two years as he has arthritis in his hands. Marko leaves the convent and Bertrille searches for him. He sees her flying. It is the day of the show. Ana gets stage fright and Reverend Mother fills in. Marko comes on and says this will be his final performance. For his act, Marko pretends to levitate Bertrille, but she is flying on her own. Dorothea Neumann as Sister Mary. Songs: "Come to My Parade" by Helen Miller and Howard Greenfield. "Gonna Build a Mountain" (from Stop the World, I Want to Get Off) by Leslie Bricusse and Anthony Newley (this version was released as a single by Colgems Records). Note: The performance of "Gonna Build a Mountain" on this episode suggests the key scene in the 1992 hit comedy Sister Act. Sally Field, Marge Redmond and Madeleine Sherwood begin singing "Gonna Build a Mountain" in a slow, reverent style and are interrupted by the Reverend Mother (Sherwood), who asks the band to "pick up the tempo." The music instantly snaps into a sixties pop version of the song, similar to the Sister Act scene in which Whoopi Goldberg and the nuns choir changed from hymn to pop with "Hail Holy Queen".
46	15	"A Star Is Reborn"	Murray Golden	Ed Jurist	January 23, 1969
At the fish market, Sisters Bertrille and Sixto see a woman diguised as a man board Carlos' yacht. It is actress Sabrina Lewis (Patricia Barry). Just then her producer Harold Harmon (Gavin MacLeod) is on the dock and calls to her. The yacht takes off and Bertrille flies after it. Sabrina walked off the set of a movie she was in. She also thinks her fiancé, Spencer Michaels (Anthony Eisley), is cheating on her. When Sabrina sees that Carlos hid Spencer on the yacht, she jumps overboard. Sabrina sees Bertrille flying towards her and faints. Bertrille rescues her before she drowns. Sabrina is taken to the convent to recover. She tells Reverend Mother that before she fainted, she had a vision of an angel. After some time at the convent, Sabrina decides to become a nun. Meanwhile, Harmon learns from Spencer and Carlos that Sabrina wants to be a nun. Harmon will sue Sabrina for breach of contract. A Process Server (Jonathan Hole) tries to serve Sabrina, but the sisters stop him. The sisters are now leery of any stranger who comes to the convent. A Father Duffy (Alan Mowbray), who claims to be a friend of Reverend Mother's, arrives. With Reverend Mother away, the sisters are suspicious and do not treat him well. Reverend Mother returns and verifies who Father Duffy is. Reverend Mother convinces Sabrina that she should return to her life as an actress. She then shows Sabrina she did not have a vision by showing her Bertrille flying. Bill Quinn as Actor posing as Priest.
47	16	"Great Casino Robbery: Part 1"	Jerome Courtland	Michael Morris	January 30, 1969
Sister Bertrille learns that family friend "Uncle" Reggie Overton Perkins (Alan Hale, Jr.) is coming to San Juan. Bertrille tells the sisters that Reggie has a shady past. When Reggie arrives, he has some suggestions for raising money for the convent. Reggie tells them that he was hired at Carlos' casino. Some of his ideas include showing customers how to spot cheaters. He put a large glass window in the counting room. Hopefully customers will gamble more to try and win the money they see. Captain Fomento thinks the glass will lure crooks to the casino. Thieves Bruce (Dick Gautier) and Faye (Ruta Lee) are enticed by the large amount of money. Bruce poses as a coin collector and leads Reggie to believe that there could be rare coins and bills in the casino. Reggie tells the sisters they could raise money for the convent by finding the rare money. Faye pretends to be Sister Mary Grace and comes to the convent. Faye claims that she knows about rare coins. The sisters want her to help them look at the coins at the casino. Following an elaborate plan, Bruce and Faye manage to steal $50,000 from the casino. Carlos tells Fomento that Reggie was the last person in the casino and he had the combination to the safe. Carlos says Reggie left his hotel with no forwarding address.
48	17	"Great Casino Robbery: Part 2"	Jerome Courtland	Michael Morris	February 6, 1969
Sister Bertrille still thinks "Uncle" Reggie could be innocent. He calls her and he says he is hiding in a barn near the convent. Bertrille finds Reggie and he says he did not take the money. He left because of other things in his past. Just then Capt. Fomento arrives and takes them into custody. Bertrille schemes to make the real thieves think they are safe by publicizing that Reggie has been arrested. Bruce calls Faye, who is pretending to be Sister Mary Grace, and tells her to meet him at the airport. Sister Mary Grace tells the sisters that it is time for her to leave San Juan. Still believing Sister Mary Grace is real, the sisters tell her about Bertrille's plan. Bertrille takes Faye to the airport where she tells Bruce they cannot leave. Bertrille sees Bruce kiss her. Bertrille also sees Bruce take Faye's suitcase. Back at the convent, Bertrille tells the others that she thinks Sister Mary Grace may be one of the crooks. Bruce calls Faye and says he will pick her up outside the convent and they will then leave by boat. After Bruce picks Faye up, Bertrille follows them to Bruce's hideout. Bertrille steals Bruce's car, forcing them to walk to the harbor. Bertrille tells Fomento and Carlos and they head to the harbor. She flies there and confronts the crooks. Bruce pulls out his gun. He trips and the gun fires. They see Bertrille flying and think she is dead and is now an angel. Fomento and Carlos arrive and arrest the two. Roger De Koven as Farmer. John Myhers as Man.
49	18	"The Boyfriend"	Jerome Courtland	Michael Morris	February 13, 1969
Many of the sisters have become ill, leaving Sister Bertille to do most of the chores at the convent, leaving her exhausted. When the sisters recover, Reverend Mother has Bertille take a long weekend at a hotel to relax. Sister Jacqueline accompanies her. Tom Grant (Bob Hastings) and Randy Putnam (Dwayne Hickman) are at the same hotel for a toy makers' convention. Randy sees Bertille by the pool in a bathing suit and recognizes her as Elsie Ethrington, a girl he met years ago. Randy remembers making the first move and they went steady for eight months. Bertille then sees Randy and remembers it was she who made the first move. They speak to each other and Randy invites her to his room later. Later, Bertille arrives and now she is wearing her habit. Randy is shocked that Bertille is a nun. After she leaves, Randy believes that Bertille became a nun because he broke up with her. That night, Randy sees Bertille flying and calls his psychoanalyst. Feeling guilty, Randy sends her expensive gifts at the convent. Bertille goes to see Randy about the presents. She meets his fiancée, Liz Martin (Cynthia Pepper), who is not happy with what Randy has been doing. Later, Liz tells Bertille that Randy broke off the engagement because he thinks he has mental health issues. Bertille assures Liz that Randy had nothing to do with her becoming a nun. Bertille makes Randy feel better about himself and he wants to marry Liz.
50	19	"The Kleptomonkeyac"	Ezra Stone	Sam Locke & Joel Rapp	February 20, 1969
Carlos asks the sisters to take care of little Pepe and they agree. They are surprised to learn Pepe is a chimpanzee. Pepe belongs to Dolores, one of Carlos' girlfriends. Reverend Mother tells Sister Bertrille that she is in charge of Pepe. Captain Fomento and Sgt. Salazar inform the sisters that there has been several burglaries in the area. While Fomento is washing his hands in the convent restroom, Pepe takes his wristwatch and puts it in Bertrille's closet. Fomento believes someone in the convent is the thief. Sister Jacqueline finds the watch and other items. She tells Reverend Mother and they wonder why Bertrille would do it. Bertrille goes to get candy for Pepe and Jacqueline follows her. Wanting to make a donation to the convent, store owner Señor Espinosa tells Bertrille to take whatever she wants. Jacqueline sees Bertrille taking things and then tells Reverend Mother she may be a kleptomaniac. Bertrille sees Pepe take a convent candlestick and chases after him. Jacqueline tells Reverend Mother that Bertrille and the candlestick are gone. Fomento overhears this and goes looking for Bertrille. Fomento eventually takes Bertrille, Jacqueline and Reverend Mother into custody. Carlos and Dolores arrive at the police station. Dolores tells them that Pepe has a habit of stealing things. Rodolfo Hoyos Jr. as Chief Galindo.
51	20	"The Moo is Blue"	Murray Golden	Frank Crow & Leo Rifkin	February 27, 1969
Farmer Gonzalo (Pedro Gonzalez Gonzalez) supplies milk to the convent. He tells Sister Bertrille that he will no longer farm and will go to St. Thomas to work for his brother-in-law. Gonzalo suggests that the convent should buy his cow, Alicia, and a deal is reached. But once the cow arrives at the convent, it stops producing milk. They bring in Dr. Escobar (Davis Roberts) to examine the cow. He says it is an emotional problem, the cow misses its familiar surroundings and is lonely. Reverend Mother tells Bertrille to find the cow another home or take it to the butcher. Bertrille has no luck finding a home for Alicia. Alicia escapes and joins several other cows, but Bertrille recovers her. Thanks to Carlos' girlfriend Danielle (Danielle De Metz), they transport Alicia on Carlos' yacht to visit Gonzalo. Bertrille asks Gonzalo to take Alicia back. They realize that Alicia gives milk when she is sung to. Song: "What a Question" Music by Jack Keller.
52	21	"The Breakaway Monk"	Murray Golden	Arthur Julian	March 6, 1969
While out flying, Sister Bertrille lands in Carlos' car. He is heading to the convent to see Reverend Mother. His income tax return is being audited and he needs a list of every donation he made to the convent. Reverend Mother needs to bring accident-prone Brother Paul (Rich Little) to examine the convent's books. The sisters do what they can to prepare the convent to prevent Paul from hurting himself. Brother Paul arrives and while Bertrille tries to protect him, accidents happen to her. Bertrille brings Carlos the paperwork he needed and he can tell she is in pain. But Paul will stay longer to fix a brick wall that Bertrille knocked over. Mr. O' Reilly (Charles Lane), from the IRS, calls Carlos and would like to meet today. Carlos says his accountant is out of town. Bertrille suggests Paul as he was once a taxman. O' Reilly arrives at the convent and Bertrille goes to get Paul. The wind picks up and Bertrille flies. Paul pulls her down and drops all of Carlos' papers. Some of them blow away and Bertrille flies after them. Without all the papers, things go poorly with O' Reilly and he leaves. Bertrille arrives with the rest of the papers and flies after O' Reilly, who then allows all of Carlos' deductions. Natividad Vacío as Bricklayer.
53	22	"Happy Birthday, Dear Gaspar"	Ezra Stone	Arthur Alsberg	March 13, 1969
Captain Gaspar Fomento gives the sisters two days to repair the pot holes in the convent's driveway. Chief Galindo tells Reverend Mother to take all the time she needs. Fomento learns from baker Mr. Dyquisto that the sisters are planning a surprise birthday party for Gaspar. Fomento believes it is for him. While talking to Carlos, Fomento sees a present with a card to Gaspar. Later, Sister Bertrille arrives to pick up the present and mentions how happy Gaspar, a boy, will be. Carlos suggests Fomento be the entertainment at the party. Bertrille asks Fomento to entertain and he thinks that is the ploy they will use to get him to the party. At the convent, Fomento meets little Gaspar and realizes the party is not for him. Mr. Dyquisto tells the sisters that Fomento thinks the party is for him. Mr. Ortiz, Gaspar's uncle, calls Reverend Mother. He would like Gaspar to fly to San Marco to spend his birthday at his amusement park. After learning of Gaspar's trip, Fomento now believes the party really is for him. Carlos calls Fomento and says he has been robbed. Fomento thinks this has something to do with the party, but Carlos really was robbed. Fomento takes Carlos to the convent, but no one is there. Thinking there is no party, Formento takes Carlos to the police station. The sisters surprise Formento there.
54	23	"Cast Your Bread Upon the Waters"	Murray Golden	William Raynor	March 20, 1969
Roberto Sanchez's (Roger De Koven) car stalls outside the convent and he needs water. He would like to taste the bread he smells baking. Sanchez says that Sister Sixto's bread is the best he has ever tasted. The sisters learn that Sanchez is the president of the second largest grocery chain in San Juan. Because they have so many bills, Sister Bertrille suggests having Sanchez sell their bread. Bertrille tells Reverend Mother that Sanchez will manage distribution, Sister Jacqueline is in charge of advertising, and Sixto will oversee the baking. Bertrille gets the money for a bread oven and flour from Carlos. After some production problems, they have their first shipment of bread. Because of another problem, Bertrille has Carlos deliver the bread in his car. A Policeman (Jamie Farr) stops the car and thanks to Bertrille, Carlos receives several citations. Sixto loses her ring and they fear it is in one of the loaves of bread. Bertrille brings back only some of the bread from Sanchez, as the rest has already sold. Jacqueline suggests a contest where the finder of the ring will win a year's supply of bread. Carlos finds the ring when he bites into a loaf. Bertrille learns that customers are returning the bread. Apparently the bread recipe did not work in the modern oven.
55	24	"The Convent Gets the Business"	Jon Andersen	Story by : Paul Richards; Teleplay by : Leo Rifkin	March 27, 1969
The convent inherits a debt-free, but run down dry goods business. Meanwhile, Carlos' cousin Luis (Alejandro Rey in a dual role) causes some costly problems at the casino. Carlos thinks a job elsewhere might be better. Sister Bertrille tells Carlos about the store and that the sisters are not allowed to run it. She wonders if Carlos can help them find someone. Carlos suggests Luis. Luis gives away merchandise as a marketing ploy and soon the store is in the red. Carlos worries that if the sisters fire Luis, he will return to the casino. Carlos pays people to buy things from the store. Flavio Pedrosa, who also owns a dry goods store, visits the convent. He complains about the unfair business practice of advertising that the convent owns the store. It was Luis' idea. Reverend Mother decides to sell the store. Luis asks Carlos to buy the store for him. Carlos admits to Bertrille that the store did so well because he paid people to go there. Bertrille worries about how Luis will feel if he learns the truth. Carlos does buy the store for Luis. Renata Vanni as Woman #1. Argentina Brunetti as Woman #2. Alma Beltran as Woman #3. Lew Palter as Man #1.
56	25	"Cousins by the Dozens"	Jerome Courtland	Frank Crow & Leo Rifkin	April 3, 1969
His Uncle Antonio Ramirez (Henry Corden) calls Carlos and asks for money. Carlos tells Antonio to stop asking for money and get a job. Sister Bertrille arrives with some children because Carlos promised them a boat ride. Then Elena (Lisa Gaye) calls Carlos and asks to see him right away in Culebra. He cancels the boat ride claiming he has to see his poor Uncle Antonio in Culebra. Carlos makes up a story about wanting Antonio to live in a vacant house Carlos owns. Back at the convent it is learned that one of the children, Violetta (Pamelyn Ferdin), is coming down with the mumps. Because Carlos hugged the girl, Bertrille flies to Culebra to warn him. Bertrille finds Antonio and tells him about the house. Bertrille eventually locates Carlos and Elena. Something Bertrille says makes Elena angry at Carlos and she leaves. Carlos learns that Bertrille told Antonio about the house. Carlos visits Antonio to try to straighten things out. There is a family gathering there to celebrate Carlos. The family reminds him of the nice things they did for him when he was a child. Carlos decides to let them move to the house. Lew Palter as Pepe. Julio Medina as Farmer. Danielle De Metz as Danielle (archive footage). E. J. Peaker as Diane (archive footage). Note: This is the only episode with narration by Alejandro Rey as Carlos instead of Marge Redmond as Sister Jacqueline. Unlike Redmond's episode-wide narrations, Rey's voiceover is heard only at the top of the episode and in the conclusion, as he is showing a home movie about what has just happened.
57	26	"The Lottery"	Oscar Ruldolph	Laurence Marks	April 10, 1969
During the sisters' fund raising drive for convent maintenance Sister Bertrille visits the outlying areas. She asks poor farmer Benito Gomez (David Hurst), but he says he has no money. He gives her a lottery ticket which is worth $25,000 if picked. Bertrille fantasizes that they win. They then argue over which extravagant things to buy. But, Bertrille wants to return the ticket to Benito. Benito and his wife Consuelo (Argentina Brunetti) reluctantly take the ticket back. They see her fly away and think that Bertrille has blessed the ticket and it will win. They want Consuelo's brother, Fernando (Al Checco), to buy into the ticket. Fernando must not tell anyone. However, word of the blessed ticket quickly spreads. People line up to buy a share of the ticket. Chief Galindo tells the sisters that he thinks Benito is running a scam. Bertrille convinces Benito and the others that she is not a saint and did not bless the ticket. Benito returns the money. The ticket wins and the others feel cheated.

=== Season 3 (1969–70) ===
No. overall	No. in season	Title	Directed by	Written by	Original release date
58	1	"The Big Game"	Jerome Courtland	Clifford Goldsmith	September 17, 1969
Sister Bertrille is working with the convent's youth baseball team. The boys complain about the poor equipment they have. They also wish that instead of only practicing, they could play a game against someone. Bertrille arranges a game for this Saturday. Carlos reluctantly buys uniforms and equipment for the team. Reverend Mother is surprised when the jerseys advertise Carlos' casino. Despite being the underdog, the team is excited. Carlos makes a bet with Delgado (Lee Delano) over who will win the game. Bertrille learns that Armando is being adopted and will not make the game. There is a girl on the other team and Marcello (Manuel Padilla Jr.) is worried about pitching to her. The night before the game, Armando is disappointed that he cannot play. Armando fantasizes about playing in a big league game against Don Drysdale and Willie Davis. At game time the convent team trails. The game is almost over and Armando's parents let him play. Though they still lose, Armando gets the only run for his team.
59	2	"My Sister the Star"	Marc Daniels	Story by : Michael Morris; Teleplay by : Dorothy Cooper Foote	September 24, 1969
At the beginning of every school year at the convent, Sister Bertrille has a local celebrity come by. This year it is TV star Claudio the Clown (Paul Winchell). Claudio hears Bertrille singing and is impressed. He would like Bertrille to perform on his show. She could donate her pay to the convent. On the TV set, the Director gives Bertrille instructions on what to do. Though nervous, Bertrille is a hit. Manuel Montique (Lawrence Montaigne), Claudio's manager, wants to give Bertrille her own show. Bertrille is uncertain about giving up her responsibilities at the convent. But the money she could earn would definitely help the convent. Bertrille then worries how fame will change her and will it affect people's attitudes toward her. She decides to not do the show. Bertrille makes outrageous demands in hopes that Manuel will turn her down. He agrees to cancel her contract and he makes a donation to the convent. Songs: "A Whole New World" by Jack Keller and Bob Russell; "World Inside My Pillow" by Helen Miller and Howard Greenfield.
60	3	"Speak the Speech, I Pray You"	Marc Daniels	Milt Rosen	October 1, 1969
The convent's new parish priest, Father Walter Larson (Robert Cummings), is an old friend of Reverend Mother's. He tells her that he has been an archivist most of his life and fears that he will not interact well with people. Walter is expected to give a speech at an upcoming banquet. He practices in front of the sisters and repeatedly interjects Latin into the boring speech. Reverend Mother tries to be kind, but Sister Bertrille says it was terrible. To lighten up his speech, Bertrille talks to Carlos's comedy-writer friend Danny Simms (Gary Crosby). But when Walter reads the joke-filled speech, it is awkward. Bertrille asks Carlos to have the banquet guests, who are mostly his employees, laugh at the jokes. At the banquet, Walter reads his original boring speech, the guests laugh, and Walter is embarrassed. The next morning Bertrille informs Walter what she did and apologizes. He is going to permanently leave the convent, but Bertrille shows him that she can fly and informs him that at first she was bad at flying, but she persisted. Walter is inspired and will stay. Note: It is revealed that Reverend Mother's first name is Lydia.
61	4	"The Paola Story"	Jerry Bernstein	Story by : Michael Morris; Teleplay by : Peggy Chantler Dick	October 8, 1969
Paola Guzman (Chelsea Brown) has been sent to the convent as a temporary secretary. Paola is efficient, but too flamboyant. Reverend Mother decides to fire her. Paola arrives with a six-month-old girl named Anita. She claims she's watching Anita for a friend whose husband died. The friend went to the States to look for a job. Reverend Mother will let Paola and Anita stay at the convent. Reverend Mother is skeptical of Paola's story. Sister Bertrille learns from Carlos that Paola briefly worked at the casino. She was married to Lorenzo Guzman, who is now a house painter. Bertrille finds Lorenzo. He tells her that Paola had their marriage annulled because he was a gambler. Lorenzo thinks that Anita is his and Paola's baby. Lorenzo comes to the convent and Paola is glad to see him. Reverend Mother gets a call from Anita's mother in the States and she'll be sending for Anita soon. Lorenzo proposes to Paola, but then learns the baby is not his. Something Bertrille does convinces the two to get together anyway. Paola tells Bertrille that Anita is their baby. Paola wanted to know if Lorenzo really wanted to be married or was just doing his duty. Naomi Stevens as Mrs. Emanuel.
62	5	"Marcello's Idol"	Jerome Courtland	John L. Greene	October 15, 1969
Sister Bertrille thinks little Marcello needs a father figure in his life. Marcello suggests Carlos. Bertrille gets Carlos to agree. He will take Marcello sailing the next day. Carlos forgets and wants to spend the day with Lila (Farrah Fawcett). But he takes Marcello on the boat with Lila. Later, Bertrille learns that Carlos spent his time with Lila and let Marcello drive the boat. Despite Marcello having a good time, Bertrille is upset that Carlos did not spend more time with him. She tells Carlos he is no longer a surrogate father. Marcello wants Carlos to adopt him, but Bertrille says Carlos would need a wife to do that. Marcello visits the newspaper editor (Peter Mamakos) to put an ad in the paper for a wife. Because it would be a good human-interest story, the editor places the ad on the front page and does not charge Marcello. Carlos learns of the ad and hides from all the women who show up. Carlos and Marcello talk and come to an understanding. Michael Pataki as Roberto.
63	6	"Guess Who’s Coming to Picket"	Harry Falk	Milt Rosen	October 22, 1969
Carlos' wait staff, led by Enrique, are on strike and are picketing in front of the casino. A newspaper cameraman photographs Sister Bertrille pouring coffee for Enrique. This makes the front page of the paper and implies the convent supports the strike. Bertrille calls Carlos to explain and he is furious, but eventually accepts Bertrille's apology. Another picture is taken of Bertrille talking to Enrique. The situation worsens when a picture of Reverend Mother accepting a donation check from Enrique is taken. Carlos' kitchen staff joins the strikers. Reverend Mother allows Bertrille, Jacqueline and Sixto to help Carlos in the kitchen. A picture of this is taken. Enrique is angry with the convent. Reverend Mother volunteers to mediate a talk between Carlos and Enrique, but the discussion goes poorly. Bertrille writes "settle" in the sky. Enrique sees the word, and thinking it is a miracle, he returns to the bargaining table. Enrique and Carlos come to an understanding.
64	7	"The Not So Great Impostor"	Harry Falk	Story by : Dorothy Cooper Foote; Teleplay by : Dorothy Cooper Foote & Lee Erwin	October 29, 1969
After being fired from a Miami newspaper, Joe Barnes (Larry Storch) comes to San Tanco to write a book, but is making no progress with it. Joe sees Sister Bertrille flying and calls his ex-editor, Reeves (John Myhers). Reeves doesn't believe him. Joe needs to get a picture of Bertrille flying and asks Carlos about local convents. Carlos warns Reverend Mother, who grounds Bertrille and instructs the sisters to not say anything. Joe dresses as a priest and tells Reverend Mother he is Father Flaherty. Joe learns that Bertrille can fly. Carlos learns of Joe's disguise and tells Reverend Mother. Joe photographs Bertrille in flight. Bertrille then learns about Joe from Carlos. She formulates a plan. Bertrille lets Joe photograph her in flight. She then photographs the other sisters in front of a blue background appearing to fly. Joe goes to see Reeves with the pictures. Bertrille had already sent her pictures to Reeves and explains how they were staged. Joe returns to explain his actions to the sisters. Bertrille feels bad and wants to tell Reeves the truth. Joe does not want Bertrille to jeopardize her future. He does have an idea for a book though.
65	8	"A Convent Full of Miracles"	Jerry Bernstein	Story by : Michael Morris; Teleplay by : Arnold Horwitt	November 5, 1969
On a stormy night, Alonzo Baldazon's (Nehemiah Persoff) car breaks down near the convent. Unaware that he is wealthy, the sisters think he is down and out and offer him a meal. Reverend Mother invites him to stay the night. Sister Bertrille tells Baldazon that they could use a handyman at the convent. Baldazon calls his assistant, Maurice, and tells him he will stay at the convent for a while. He tells Maurice to tell people he is in Canada on business. While doing the odd jobs, Baldazon discovers things that need replacing. Suddenly items appear: a stove, a hot-water heater and then a children's wading pool. Interestingly, they are all things Bertrille wished for. Some of the sisters think Bertrille is a miracle worker. But they think that Carlos is responsible. Baldazon confesses that he bought all the items to reciprocate their kindness. When they do not believe him, he has them call Maurice on Baldazon's yacht. Maurice tells Reverend Mother that Baldazon is in Canada. Reverend Mother doesn't tell Baldazon what Maurice said and Baldazon leaves. Reverend Mother does tell the sisters. While flying, Bertrille sees Baldazon on his yacht and realizes he was telling the truth.
66	9	"Hector and the Brass Bed"	Lou Antonio	Stanley Adams & George F. Slavin	November 12, 1969
The sisters hope to raise money by selling a brass bed. Junk dealer Antonio Fuentes (Titos Vandis) talks Sisters Bertrille and Sixto into trading the bed for a donkey named Hector. Hector causes problems at the convent and eats anything he can. Reverend Mother has had enough and tells Bertrille to return Hector to Antonio. Antonio sold the bed and is using the money to gamble at Carlos' casino. He is winning. Knowing what Hector is like and the fact that his wife Angela hates it, Antonio turns down Bertrille. After Bertrille leaves, Antonio starts losing. Every time Antonio sees one of the sisters, bad things happen to him. He thinks they put a curse on him. A veterinarian suggests getting Hector a companion, so the sisters get him a dog named Barnaby. Barnaby calms Hector. Carlos suggests to Antonio that he donate what he made selling the bed to the convent. Then ask them to remove the curse. Carlos calls Reverend Mother and tells her to humor Antonio about the curse. Antonio gives the sisters $200 and they "remove" the curse. Hector stays at the convent.
67	10	"The New Habit"	Jerry Bernstein	Burt Styler	November 19, 1969
Mother General (Edith Atwater) has mandated that the sisters wear a new style habit. The sisters like the modern habits. Sister Bertrille learns that the new cornette prevents her from flying and is disappointed. Bertrille has Sister Jacqueline promise to not tell the others. The sisters learn that Bertrille has been grounded. Reverend Mother tells her that she can take one last flight with her old habit. The sisters are sad for Bertrille. Reverend Mother wants them to make a better appearance at their used clothing drive. Bertrille visits Carlos to pick up some clothes. Carlos can tell something is wrong. Bertrille says she will never fly again. Mother General arrives for an inspection. Carlos has a plan. He has Dolores (Corinne Camacho), part of his floor show, design an outfit similar to the new habit. Dolores shows the outfit to the sisters and Mother General and she says it will take Puerto Rico by storm. Not wanting everyone in town to resemble the nuns, Mother General tells the sisters to wear the old habits.
68	11	"Bertrille and the Silent Flicks"	Harry Falk	Story by : Michael Morris; Teleplay by : Leo Rifkin	November 26, 1969
Mother General Adelaide of Culebra (Miriam Hopkins) would like the convent to hold a fund-raiser. The sisters want to hold a rummage sale. They learn that Mother General was silent film actress Gloria Davenport before becoming a nun. After talking to Carlos' assistant Leonardo, Sister Bertrille decides to raise money by having a screening of Gloria Davenport's silent film "Lure of the West". Mother General agrees with the idea. The film arrives and Carlos screens it for some of the sisters without Mother General. They laugh at it even though it was a dramatic film. They cannot cancel the showing when Leonardo says it is sold out and he raised $1200. They don't want to embarrass the Mother General when the audience laughs at the movie. Carlos finds a way to have Mother General called back to Culebra on convent business on the night of the screening. During the screening, the audience laughs. Bertrille learns that Leonardo found a way to have Mother General return for the screening. Bertrille tries to stall Mother General's arrival. At the theater, Mother General is at first upset that the audience is laughing. But then she too sees the humor in the movie. Julian Rivero as Old Man. Note: Miriam Hopkins was Oscar-nominated for Best Actress in 1935's Becky Sharp, considered the first three-strip Technicolor feature film.
69	12	"A Ticket for Bertrille"	Jerry Bernstein	Roy Kammerman	December 10, 1969
While spending a day with Little Marcello, Sister Bertrille breaks three traffic rules. At first Officer Juarez (Gregory Sierra) ignores the violations because Bertrille is a nun. She forces Juarez to give her a ticket because she wants to show Marcello that even nuns have to obey the law. Carlos sees this. He complains that his casino was robbed of $5000, but the police are giving nuns tickets. A crowd gathers and is upset with Juarez. Juarez was going to propose to his girlfriend Dolores. She is upset because what happened is in the news. Mayor Salvador Calderon (Julio Medina), who is running for re-election, is being hurt by the negative publicity. The Judge (Lew Palter), who will hear Bertrille's case, is also on Calderon's ticket. Bertrille will not let the Judge dismiss the case. Because she cannot pay the fine, he has to imprison for two days. Bertrille shares a cell with Rosita (Lisa Gaye). Rosita thinks Bertrille is a police spy, because they think her boyfriend was involved with the casino robbery. While in the prison yard, Bertrille is caught in an updraft and is flown out of the jail. Bertrille returns and Rosita now trusts her. Rosita confesses that she knows where her boyfriend hid the casino money. Bertrille tells Juarez, who finds the money. Bertrille wants to tell the truth why she was in jail. The press, however, tells the story that Bertrille was planted to solve the casino case. Joseph Bernard as Warden. Victor Campos as Reporter.
70	13	"The New Carlos"	Oscar Rudolph	Story by : Michael Morris; Teleplay by : Lee Erwin	December 17, 1969
Something that Sister Bertrille inadvertently does puts Carlos in traction in a hospital. Meanwhile, Reverend Mother, Sister Jacqueline and Bertrille are trying to think of men who could be "San Tanco Dads" (STD). These would be prominent men who would be surrogate fathers for the orphaned children. Reverend Mother does not think they should ask Carlos for any more favors right now. Carlos would like to tell Bertrille off. He brings Diane Valdez to the airport. Carlos runs into Bertrille, who is picking up her cousin Regina Atwater (Sandra Smith) from Boston. He is about to tell Bertrille off when he is taken in by beautiful Regina. Carlos learns that his assistant Roberto was asked to be an STD, so he is hurt by not being asked. Carlos now thinks the sisters are ashamed of him. He decides to change his image and personality. Carlos and Regina start spending time together. The sisters miss the old Carlos. Carlos tells Bertrille that he wants to marry Regina. He proposes to Regina and she rejects him because he is so stuffy. Carlos reverts to his old ways and Bertrille asks him to be an STD.
71	14	"Dear Aggie"	Joseph Bernard	Leo Rifkin	December 31, 1969
The convent's cat, Delfina, has given birth to six kittens. Sister Bertrille goes to the San Tanco Tribune to place an ad for the kittens. She talks to sports writer Rickie Malinas (Henry Corden). Rickie says that he's been filling in for the "Dear Aggie" advice column. He convinces Bertrille to take over the column until the paper can find a permanent replacement. Dear Aggie receives a letter from Margareta Pedrosa about how her new boyfriend gave her a cheap present. Unknown to Bertrille, the boyfriend is Carlos' assistant, Roberto. Bertrille gives her some advice and then consults Carlos on what further advice she could give. The situation becomes confusing for Roberto. After Carlos goes to the paper, he realizes that Bertrille is Aggie. Bertrille and Carlos dispense more advice. Bertrille suspects that Carlos is Margareta's boyfriend. Carlos lets Roberto use his place to have Margareta over for dinner. Margareta is taken to Carlos' place by her brother, Luis Pedrosa (Jack Donner). Bertrille is outside and confesses to her that she is Aggie. There are some mistaken identities because of Bertrille. Luis punches Carlos in the eye. The misunderstandings are cleared up.
72	15	"My Sister, the Doctor"	Richard Kinon	Story by : Michael Morris & Milt Rosen; Teleplay by : Milt Rosen	January 7, 1970
The convent will host the Bishop's (Edward Colmans) retirement party. Sister Bertrille's sister Dr. Jennifer Ethrington (Elinor Donahue) comes to San Tanco for some rest and relaxation. Bertrille had an accident while flying and fractures her foot. Jennifer visits her in the hospital. Carlos arrives and mentions there is a medical convention in town. Jennifer wants to avoid staying at the hotel and running into other doctors. She agrees to stay at the convent. Jennifer gets no rest there. Sister Jacqueline has a twisted ankle, Sixto has heartburn, Reverend Mother has a bad back and Sister Enid has bursitis. Bertrille tells Jennifer to not mention that she is a doctor at the Bishop's party. At the party, Carlos tells Mayor Salvador Calderon (Rodolfo Hoyos Jr.) that Jennifer works with ceramics. That is Salvador's hobby. Carlos then tells Countess Avecchi (Nancy Malone) that Jennifer is a bookkeeper. The Countess is interested in finances. Because of something Jennifer says, the Bishop thinks she plays the piano. He would like her to play something. Jennifer is saved when Louisa (Annette Charles), a party guest, goes into labor. Jennifer winds up in Bertrille's hospital room with exhaustion. Bertrille tells everyone that Jennifer is a veterinarian. People start coming to her with pet problems. Pepe Hern as Roul. Penny Santon as Nurse.
73	16	"Armando and the Pool Table"	Lou Antonio	Story by : Michael Morris; Teleplay by : Ralph Goodman & Sam Locke	January 23, 1970
Sister Bertrille visits Carlos to get a new deck of cards. Carlos has a pool table he has been trying to get rid of. He donates it to the convent. Meanwhile, Reverend Mother reprimands little Armando for his dangerous activities. Bertrille thinks pool would be a safer pastime for Armando. At first Armando is uninterested. Emilio Gomez (John Hoyt), a friend of Carlos', arrives to see the pool table. Emilio is quite good at the game and Armando asks him to be his teacher. Armando spends much time playing pool, causing his school work to suffer. Reverend Mother wants the pool table gone. Bertrille worries that Armando will miss the table and want to play even more. Bertrille visits Carlos, who is relaxing poolside with his secretary, Miss Preem (Farrah Fawcett). Bertrille wants Carlos to beat Armando so he will lose interest in pool. Carlos wins. Bertrille wants a rematch and pretends to bet $5000 on the game. Armando, not wanting to disappoint the sisters, reluctantly agrees to play. Reverend Mother stops the game and Armando says he won't play pool anymore. Fred Sadoff as Hernandez.
74	17	"Hello, Columbus"	Ezra Stone	Arnold Horwitt	January 30, 1970
Sister Bertrille wants to stage a pageant about when Columbus first arrived in Puerto Rico. The lead in her play falls sick and cannot perform. Meanwhile Carlos' cousin Luis Ramirez (Alejandro Rey in a dual role) is working at the casino now that his dry goods store has gone bankrupt. Luis is causing problems. When Bertrille tells Carlos that she is looking for someone to play Columbus, Carlos suggests Luis. Desperate, Bertrille accepts. Luis quits the play because he does not want to wear a school boy's costume. To keep Luis out of the casino, Carlos will supply new costumes for the play. Luis learns that Queen Isabella is played by a child and quits again. Carlos gets his temporary bookkeeper, Marta Vargas, to play Isabella. Luis is smitten with Marta and cannot concentrate on the play. Bertrille asks Carlos to be Luis' go-between with Marta. Marta thinks Carlos is in love with her. Luis sees Marta kissing Carlos. He runs off and quits the play. Bertrille convinces him to return. The play is a hit and Luis decides on a career in show business. He tells Carlos that he will take over the casino's floor show.
75	18	"The Dumbest Kid in School"	Jerome Courtland	Roy Kammerman	February 6, 1970
Little orphan Joey (Eric Shea) is a mischievous, underachieving child at the convent. Sister Jacqueline mentions that Sister Bertrille is visiting her parents in Brooklyn. Mr. Sanders (Robert Lansing) visits the convent. He was an orphan there when he was younger. He was adopted and because of his parents, he became successful. Sanders would like to adopt a child and give them the same chance he had. He wants to adopt the dumbest child in school, because that's what he was. Reverend Mother suggests Joey. After Joey learns about Sanders, he would like to get some advice from Carlos. Joey asks Carlos how he should act on a picnic with Sanders. Carlos tells him to be courteous and well-behaved. After the picnic, Sanders tells Reverend Mother he was hoping for a boy that would need more help. Reverend Mother learns from Carlos the advice he gave Joey. She talks Sanders into going on a camping trip and she tells Joey to be himself. This time Joey acts just the way Sanders liked. Joey feels hurt when Sanders mentions the dumbest child in school. Joey and Sanders come to an understanding and Sanders knows he picked the right child. Note: This is the only episode in which Sally Field did not appear.
76	19	"Man’s Best Friend Isn’t"	Jerry Bernstein	Milt Rosen	February 13, 1970
Plumber Felix Ragusa (Gino Conforti) is doing some work at the convent. Sister Bertrille would like to get Felix some work at Carlos' casino. Carlos agrees to have Felix do a major plumbing job. Felix needs to get supplies, so he asks Carlos to watch his dog, Tiger. Carlos is too busy, so he brings Tiger to Bertrille. Bertrille tries to decline, but Reverend Mother says Tiger can stay. Because it has happened before, Bertrille worries that Tiger will become attached to her and forget about Felix. After a couple days, Felix returns and Tiger wants nothing to do with him. Tiger returns to the convent to be with Bertrille. Despite loving Tiger, Felix wants Bertrille to keep him. Because all he can think about is Tiger, Felix makes many mistakes with the casino's plumbing. Carlos wants Bertrille to correct the situation. Bertrille learns that Tiger is afraid of birds. She flies in front of him and Tiger runs back to Felix. Felix is now able to finish the work at the casino. As a thank you, Felix gives Bertrille a dog which is Tiger's brother. Note: The conclusion of this episode introduces Sister Bertrille's dog Horatio, who appears through the end of the series, an unusual move for a sitcom, in which a pet appears in early episodes of a series' run and soon vanishes.
77	20	"The Somnaviatrix"	Jerry Bernstein	John L. Greene	February 20, 1970
Sister Bertrille begins to fly while asleep. One night, Carlos is with Sophia Novello, the daughter of business associate Antonio Novello (Joe De Santis). Carlos drives her home after a party. His car becomes stuck in a mud hole. Getting Sophia home very late will not sit well with Antonio. Bertrille drops by and Carlos tells her he needs a tow truck. But she is asleep and flies off. The next day, Raoul (Gregory Sierra) tells Carlos that an angry Antonio is on his way. Antonio tells Carlos that Sophia is engaged to Paco Lopez (Frank Ramirez). Her being out that late with Carlos does not look good. Carlos wants Bertrille to vouch for him. She says she cannot because she did not see him last night. Antonio no longer wants to do business with Carlos. Paco breaks off his engagement to Sophia. That night, Reverend Mother and Sister Jacqueline see Bertrille flying in her sleep. The next morning, they tell Bertrille about her sleep flying. Carlos' story about Sophia must be true. Bertrille explains the situation to Antonio, but he does not believe her. Bertrille shows Paco that she can fly and he now believes Carlos' story. Paco makes up with the Novellos and Antonio will make amends with Carlos. Reverend Mother finds a way to cure Bertrille's sleep flying.
78	21	"Papa Carlos"	Jerome Courtland	Stanley Adams & George F. Slavin	February 27, 1970
Carlos tells Sisters Bertrille and Sixto that he's the foster parent of a Korean war orphan, Kim Ching (Miko Mayama), who will soon visit. Carlos would like the sisters to pick her up at the airport. Carlos and the sisters expect a girl. But the sisters see that Kim is a beautiful young woman. Carlos is stunned upon seeing Kim. Kim says she's also here to seek a husband. Carlos asks if Kim can stay at the convent. Ramon Diaz, the convent's gardener, is smitten with Kim. He speaks Korean as he was there during the war. Ramon tells Bertrille that he would like to take Kim out. Carlos opposes the idea, because he remembers what a ladies' man Ramon was when he worked at the casino. Kim thinks that Carlos will not let her date anyone else because he wants to marry her. Carlos tells her that he does not want to be married. Kim would still like to take care of Carlos. Ramon wants to tell off Carlos, because he thinks Carlos is taking advantage of her affections. Carlos gives Ramon permission to take out Kim and soon Ramon and Kim elope.
79	22	"The Candid Commercial"	Harry Falk	John L. Greene	March 6, 1970
The convent's washing machine has broken down. Sister Bertrille asks Carlos to buy them one, but he suggests going to the laundromat. Unknown to Bertrille, Harry Madison (Pat Harrington Jr.) and Eddie, a commercial producer and cameraman, are shooting a candid camera commercial for Delight laundry detergent. Bertrille happens to use Delight detergent. Bertrille is excited when she learns she was filmed. She is awarded a new washing machine and a year's supply of Delight. Bertrille signs a release. When Bertrille tells her what happened, Reverend Mother refuses to let a nun be in a commercial. Reverend Mother wants Bertrille to get Harry to release her from her commitment. Harry says that there's nothing he can do. Bertrille asks Carlos his advice as he knows Harry. Carlos tries to lead Harry to think Bertrille is crazy when they overhear her talk about flying. Carlos also says that she is a go-go dancer and has ties to the Mob. Harry will release Bertrille from the contract. The Bishop (Ivor Francis) tells Reverend Mother and Bertrille that he sees nothing wrong with the commercial. Bertrille cannot convince Harry to use the commercial. Thinking that it will help Bertrille stay away from the Mafia, Harry agrees to give the convent the washing machine and detergent, plus a dryer.
80	23	"A Gift for El Charro"	Lou Antonio	George F. Slavin & Stanley Adams	March 13, 1970
Pablo Cortina visits the convent seeking work. Sister Sixto learns that he doesn't speak English. Reverend Mother says they have much handyman work around the convent, but they couldn't pay him. Pablo would work in exchange for being taught to speak and write in English. Carlos drops some baseball equipment off at the convent. He thinks Pablo looks like El Charro, a famous bullfighter from Madrid. Carlos also mentions that he is fond of his new girlfriend, Theresa (Corinne Camacho). Later, Carlos learns that Pablo really is El Charro. Carlos speaks to Pablo. Carlos tells the sisters that Pablo's father was an orphan at the convent. Pablo figured this was a good place to hide while he learned English. A newspaperman and Ramon Esteban (Lloyd Battista), El Charro's manager, come to the convent looking for Pablo. Carlos was posing as the handyman. There is a misunderstanding and an article appears in the paper implying that Carlos is learning to read and write English. Things become confusing when Carlos cannot read anything because an ophthalmologist put pupil-dilating drops in his eyes. Theresa is concerned that Carlos is illiterate. She breaks up with him. Bertrille and El Charro go to explain things to Theresa. Theresa believes them but she and El Charro fall for each other. Harvey Jason as Fernando Morales. Alfred Dennis as Chef.
81	24	"When Generations Gap"	Leon Benson	Burt Styler	March 20, 1970
Reverend Mother would like Sister Bertrille to take the station wagon in for maintenance. Bertrille is not paying attention, runs a red light and hits another car. The occupants of the other car are the two members of the singing group, The Paper Balloon (Boyce and Hart). A policeman (Eugene Iglesias) arrives. Bertrille is willing take responsibility for the accident. Alfonso T. Gomez, a witness, claims it wasn't her fault. He blames the hippies. Carlos sends his lawyer to help the group as they are performing at the casino. Carlos goes to talk with Bertrille. She would like the whole thing forgotten. But then on TV is a media story about subversive hippies against an innocent nun. The story ruins the opening night for the group. After talking to the group, Bertrille realizes it was the station wagon's loose brakes that caused her to run the red light. She wonders why Alfonso claimed it was the group's fault. Alfonso admits to Bertrille it was her fault. He figures the convent could use the insurance money from the rich hippies. Alfonso feels the way he does because his son is a hippie. Alfonso tells the newspaper what really happened, but the story now makes it look as though the group paid off Alfonso. To change public opinion, Bertrille suggests the group do a benefit concert with the proceeds going to the convent. Michael Gray as Young Man.
82	25	"Operation Population"	Jerome Courtland	Arnold Horwitt	March 27, 1970
The sisters are playing with some children at a day camp in a park in San Tanco. Sgt. Santos (Joseph Bernard) puts up a sign stating the park must be sold. The sisters invite Mayor Calderon to the convent. He tells them the land must be sold to cover back taxes. There is an aid program, but San Tanco would need 4000 residents. They are 42 short. The land will be sold in three weeks. The sisters check the hospitals to see if there have been any births. Reverend Mother reminds them about deaths in the town. They suggest finding a wealthy person to buy the land. Sister Bertrille goes to see Carlos, who says business has been bad. The sisters go to the outlying areas to coax people to move to the town. Four days remain and they are still ten people short. Bertrille learns that Pedro Ferone (Lew Palter) wants to build an office tower on the land. Bertrille hears that Carlos' chef, Cesar (Alfred Dennis), has been sending money to his sister in New York, who has eight children. Bertrille gets Carlos to hire Cesar's brother-in-law, Jason, who is also a cook, and have them move to San Tanco. But Cesar and his family decide to move to New York. Because of Pedro Ferone and his family, the day camp stays. Jose De Vega as Antonio. Pedro Gonzalez Gonzalez as Farmer. Victor Millan as Architect. Naomi Stevens as Señora Rosales. Hilary Thompson as Susan. Alma Beltran as Ava Ferone.
83	26	"No Tears for Mrs. Thomas"	Jon Andersen	George Slavin & Stanley Adams	April 3, 1970
Thomas Martinez (Frank Silvera), Carlos' uncle, brings fish to the convent. He asks the sisters to arrange his funeral, which will be in a week from yesterday. Thomas says he has had a full life, with four wives and many children. Carlos tells Sisters Jacqueline and Bertrille that maybe his uncle is getting senile. Dr. Escovito (Don Diamond) tells Carlos and Bertrille that there is nothing wrong with Thomas. Thomas reveals to Bertrille that he has seen the "Martinez Sign". Many of his male ancestors have seen it and died exactly seven days later. He also mentions that he wanted to marry Luisa Montero (Penny Santon), but she declined. Luisa tells Bertrille that she would like to make Thomas' last days happy. Reverend Mother learns that Thomas has been charging funeral expenses to the convent. Thomas tells Carlos that all the bills will be paid. The convent is the beneficiary to his life insurance money. Martinez tells Carlos and Bertrille that the sign is a big white bird flying overhead. Carlos wants prove to Thomas that what he saw was Bertrille. But Thomas faints before he sees her flying. Luisa wants to marry a bedridden Thomas. As the Priest (Booth Colman) performs the ceremony, Thomas sees Bertrille flying outside his window. Thomas now believes he will live and the marriage proceeds. Larry Gelman as Mendoza. Lou Antonio as Stone Mason.
