= Lew Palter =

American actor (1928–2023)

- Palter in Titanic, 1997
- Born: Leon Louis Palter; November 3, 1928; New York City, U.S.
- Died: May 21, 2023 (aged 94); Los Angeles, California, U.S.
- Education: Tufts University; Alfred University; Northwestern University
- Occupation: Actor
- Spouse: Nancy Vawter (m. 1956; died 2020)
- Children: 2

Leon Louis Palter (November 3, 1928 – May 21, 2023) was an American actor. He was best known for playing Isidor Straus in the 1997 film Titanic. Aside from acting, he was longtime instructor at the CalArts School of Theater.

== Early life ==
Leon Louis Palter was born in New York City's Brooklyn borough on November 3, 1928. He graduated from Tufts University and earned his master's degree at Alfred University. He also earned his PhD degree in theater at Northwestern University.

== Career ==
Palter appeared in New York productions such as The Madwoman of Chaillot and An Enemy of the People. He also directed Off-Broadway plays including Let Man Live, Overruled and The Trial of Lucullus. In 1965, he directed and produced with Robert L. Hobbs at the Millbrook Playhouse. He acted and directed on summer stock theaters. He began his screen career in 1967 with an appearance in the television series Run for Your Life. He guest-starred in numerous television programs including The A-Team, Day by Day, Charlie's Angels, Baretta, The Virginian, Columbo, The High Chaparral, Gunsmoke, Mission: Impossible, The Six Million Dollar Man, The Bionic Woman, Kojak, The Brady Bunch and The Flying Nun. He also played Det. Clark in seven episodes of the CBS drama television series Delvecchio, and guest-starred in The Doris Day Show. Aside from playing Isidor Straus in Titanic, he appeared in other films, such as The Steagle and First Monday in October.

Having started teaching acting at the CalArts School of Theater in 1971, Palter remained a faculty member there until his retirement in 2013. His many students included Don Cheadle, Ed Harris, and Cecily Strong.

== Personal life ==
Palter was married to actress and costumer Nancy (née Vawter) from 1956 until her death in 2020. They had two daughters together.

Palter died from lung cancer at his home in Los Angeles, on May 21, 2023, at the age of 94.
