= Julio Medina =

Colombian actor (1933–2024)

- Born: Julio Medina Salazar; 16 January 1933; Chiquinquirá, Colombia
- Died: 23 November 2024 (aged 91); Bogotá, Colombia
- Education: Pasadena Playhouse
- Occupation: Actor
- Years active: 1966–2016

Julio Medina Salazar (16 January 1933 – 23 November 2024) was a Colombian actor. He was notable for his debut work in Gunsmoke and for his award-winning role in Las aguas mansas. For nearly thirty years, Medina worked and lived in Los Angeles until moving to Colombia, later basing his acting works there.

In his Hollywood career he appeared in numerous television roles ranging from I Dream of Jeannie to The Partridge Family. He was considered to be the first Colombian actor to have a successful Hollywood career in the United States.

== Early life ==
Medina was born in Chiquinquirá, Colombia in 1933. He studied at Pontifical Xavierian University and later at the Pasadena Playhouse after moving to the United States in 1954. He was enlisted in the United States Navy where he served for two years.

== Career ==
In 1965, Medina moved to Peru to make small movies, but moved to the United States afterwards.

He made his acting debut in the television series Gunsmoke (as Pedro, in S11E8 episode "The Reward").

In his Hollywood career he worked alongside Michael Douglas, Hal Holbrook, David Carradine and Sally Field.

In his career in the United States, Medina also appeared in I Dream of Jeannie, The Partridge Family, Kung Fu, The Rockford Files, Wonder Woman, Dallas and in Drug Wars: The Camarena Story.

In 1984, Medina returned to Colombia where he continued to make movies and telenovelas. In Colombia, he is known for his roles in Cascabel (1985), Las Aguas Mansas (1994), La viuda de Blanco (1996) and in El pasado no perdona (2005).

He appeared in the 2016 comedy film Malcriados as Omar until retiring shortly afterwards.

== Personal life and death ==
In a 2017 interview, Medina stated he lived on his own in solitude in rural Colombia and while asked about his bachelorhood and rumours about him being a homosexual, he said: "I've had friends, very beautiful friends, but marriage?!, Not even for the devil".

Medina died aged 91, in Bogotá on 23 November 2024.

== Partial filmography ==
In the United States:

- 1965-1972: Gunsmoke (TV Series) - Pedro / Rodríguez / Fermin
- 1966: I Dream of Jeannie (TV Series) - Stranger
- 1967-1970: The Flying Nun (TV Series) - Mayor Salvador Calderon / Farmer / Head Waiter / Juan Cortez / Pedro Caracol / Señor Trotto / Caterer
- 1968: El tesoro de Atahualpa
- 1968-1969: The Wild Wild West (TV Series) - Townsman / Don Carlos
- 1969: It Takes a Thief (TV Series) - Greeter / Haberdasher
- 1969-1970: The High Chaparral (TV Series) - First Man / Sanchez
- 1970: The Partridge Family (TV Series) - Chavez
- 1971: Bearcats! (TV Series) - Ramirez
- 1972: Banacek (TV Series) - Padre Borda
- 1973-1975: Kung Fu (TV Series) - Padre / Father Salazar
- 1974: The Streets of San Francisco (TV Series) - Nick Solano
- 1974-1976: Harry O (TV Series) - Legation Official / Jesus Quinlan / Dr. Troy
- 1974-1977: Chico and the Man (TV Series) - Doctor Spanola / Banker Sanchez / Mr. Delgado
- 1975: The Rockford Files (TV Series) - Gardener
- 1976-1977: Delvecchio (TV Series) - Jorge
- 1977: Wonder Woman (TV Series) - Captain Gaitan
- 1977: The Hardy Boys/Nancy Drew Mysteries (TV Series) - Clerk
- 1978: ABC Weekend Specials (TV Series) - Martín
- 1978: Police Story (TV Series) - Pedro
- 1979: Centennial (TV Series) - Padre Gravez
- 1981: Zoot Suit - Lowrider's Father
- 1981: The New Adventures of Zorro (TV Series) - Miguel
- 1982-1986: Dallas (TV Series) - Henry Figueroa
- 1983: The Greatest American Hero, Vanity Says The Preacher (TV Series) - Dr. Romero
- 1984: Scarecrow and Mrs. King (TV Series) - Caesar Varga
- 1984: Airwolf (TV Series) - Col. Arias
- 1985: Latino - Salazar
- 1987: Starman (TV Series) - Pepe
- 1988: Little Nikita - Soccer Announcer
- 1989: Hard Time on Planet Earth (TV Series) - Gardener
- 1990: Drug Wars: The Camarena Story (TV Series) - Benjamin Piza
- 1996: Ilona Arrives with the Rain - Wito
- 1998: Rizo - Ataúlfo
- 2002: After Party
- 2004: Colombianos, un acto de fe
- 2005: El trato
- 2006: Karmma, el peso de tus actos - Juan Diego Valbuena
- 2011: Gordo, calvo y bajito - Pedro
