= Annette Charles =

American actress, dancer, and educator (1948-2011)

- Born: Annette Cardona; March 5, 1948; Los Angeles, California, U.S.
- Died: August 3, 2011 (aged 63); Los Angeles, California, U.S.
- Occupations: Actress; dancer; educator
- Years active: 1968–2009

Annette Charles (née Cardona; March 5, 1948 – August 3, 2011) was an American actress, dancer, and educator best known for her role as Charlene "Cha-Cha" DiGregorio in the 1978 feature film Grease. She made several appearances on television as well.

== Early life ==
Charles was born Annette Cardona in Los Angeles, California, of Mexican and Italian ancestry.

== Career ==
Charles became an actress, and was best known for her role as Charlene "Cha Cha" DiGregorio in the 1978 feature film Grease. She made several appearances on television as well.

Charles later earned a bachelor's degree from Antioch University Los Angeles in psychology and theater, and a master's degree in social work from New York University before becoming a speech communication professor in the Chicano Studies department at California State University, Northridge.

== Personal life and death ==
Charles died on August 3, 2011, in Los Angeles from lung cancer, aged 63. She initially was hospitalized for pneumonia.

== Credits ==
Film
Year	Title	Role	Notes
1978	Grease	Charlene "Cha-Cha" DiGregorio	
1979	In Search of Historic Jesus	Mary Magdalene	documentary
1985	Latino	Marlena	as Annette Cardona
2009	Transylmania	Administrator	

Television
Year	Title	Role	Notes
1968	The High Chaparral	Jill	episode: "Follow Your Heart"
1970	The Flying Nun	Louisa	episode: "My Sister, the Doctor" as Annette Cardona
1970	Gunsmoke	Rita	episode: "The Noonday Devil" as Annette Cardona
1972	The Mod Squad	Cory	episode: "No More Oak Leaves for Ernie Holland" as Annette Cardona
1972	Bonanza	Carmen	episode: "The Customs of the Country"
1972	Banacek	Cecelia Gomez	episode: "No Sign of the Cross" as Annette Cardona
1972-1974	Emergency!	Mrs. Harrow / Wife	2 episodes
1974-1977	Barnaby Jones	Angela / Lucy Stahl	2 episodes
1976	The Bionic Woman	Elora / Emerald	2 episodes
1977	Man from Atlantis	Ginny Mendoza	episode: "The Death Scouts" as Annette Courset
1978	Centennial	Senora Alvarez	TV miniseries, episode: "Only the Rocks Live Forever"
1979	Can You Hear the Laughter? The Story of Freddie Prinze	Billy	TV movie
1980	The Incredible Hulk	Rita Montoya	episode: "Falling Angels"
1981	Musical Comedy Tonight II		TV documentary
1987	Magnum, P.I.	Maria Torres	episode: "On the Fly"
