= Latino (film) =

1985 film

- Film poster
- Directed by: Haskell Wexler
- Written by: Haskell Wexler
- Produced by: Benjamin Berg; George Lucas (uncredited)
- Starring: Robert Beltran; Annette Charles
- Cinematography: Newton Thomas Sigel
- Edited by: Robert Dalva
- Music by: Diane Louie
- Production companies: Lucasfilm; Las Flores Company; Neruda Corporation
- Distributed by: Cinecom Pictures
- Release dates: May 14, 1985 (Cannes); October 1985 (Chicago)
- Running time: 105 minutes
- Country: United States
- Languages: English; Spanish

Latino is a 1985 American war film directed by Haskell Wexler. It was screened in the Un Certain Regard section at the 1985 Cannes Film Festival.

== Plot ==
Set in the context of the Sandinista government in Nicaragua and their battle with the U.S.-backed Contra rebels in 1979, Mexican-American Vietnam vet Eddie Guerrero (Robert Beltran) was sent to help U.S. Special Forces train Contra rebels. Eddie falls for a local girl, Marlena (Annette Charles). However, when her father is killed by the Contras, things change.

== Cast ==
- Robert Beltran as Eddie Guerrero
- Annette Charles as Marlena (as Annette Cardona)
- Américo González as Malena's Father
- Michael Goodwin as Becket
- Ricardo López as Attila
- Gavin MacFadyen as Major Metcalf
- Walter Marín as Gilberto
- Julio Medina as Salazar
- Juan Carlos Ortiz as Marlena's son
- Tony Plana as Ruben
- Luis Torrentes as Luis
