= Tere Ríos =

American writer (1917–1999)

Marie Teresa Ríos
- Born: November 9, 1917; New York City, U.S.
- Died: October 17, 1999 (aged 81); Sarasota, Florida, U.S.
- Resting place: Arlington National Cemetery
- Occupation: Author
- Spouse: Humbert Joseph Versace
- Children: 5, including Humbert Roque and Richard

Notes
- 1. Authored The Fifteenth Pelican, which was the basis for the 1960s television sitcom The Flying Nun.; 2. Mother of Medal of Honor recipient Humbert Roque Versace and of Dick Versace, former coach of the Indiana Pacers.

Marie Teresa Ríos (November 9, 1917 – October 17, 1999), known as Tere Ríos, was an American writer and the author of the 1965 book The Fifteenth Pelican, which was the basis for the 1960s Screen Gems television sitcom The Flying Nun. Ríos was the mother of Humbert Roque Versace, the first U.S. Army prisoner of war in Southeast Asia awarded the Medal of Honor.

== Early years ==
Ríos was born in Brooklyn, New York City, to Rafael Rios, a native of Puerto Rico who moved and settled in Brooklyn in the early part of the 20th century and to Marie Teresa Dowd, an American of Irish heritage. Ríos was proud of her Puerto Rican heritage and a devout Catholic who became interested in writing at a young age.

In the 1930s, she met and married Humbert Joseph Versace, a 1933 graduate of the United States Military Academy (West Point). Together they had five children, Humbert Roque, twins Stephen and Richard Versace (former coach of the Indiana Pacers), Michael and Trilby. As an Army wife, she traveled to different places around the world, including Hawaii, where her first child, Humbert Roque, was born.

== Career as a writer ==
During World War II, Ríos (also known as Marie Teresa Ríos Versace (Note: This name uses Spanish marriage naming customs; the first is the maiden family name "Ríos" and the second or matrimonial family name is "Versace".)) drove Army trucks and buses. She also served as a pilot for the Civil Air Patrol. Ríos wrote and edited for various newspapers around the world, including places such as Guam, Germany, Wisconsin, and South Dakota, and publications such as the Armed Forces Star & Stripes and Gannett.

She also taught creative writing at the University of Pittsburgh and was on the staff of the Rhinelander Writers Conference. In 1958, she was named "Wisconsin Writer of the Year". In 1957, Ríos published her first book An Angel Grows Up using the pen name "Tere Ríos". She soon followed that with another book, Brother Angel (1963).

== The Fifteenth Pelican and Humbert Roque Versace ==
Her eldest son, Humbert Roque Versace, followed his father's footsteps and graduated from West Point. He was sent to the Republic of Vietnam as a military advisor with the rank of captain. During his second tour in Vietnam he was captured on October 29, 1963, along with two other Americans, by the Viet Cong. Captain Versace was executed by his captors on September 26, 1965, an event which devastated her.

She published her third book, titled The Fifteenth Pelican, in 1966. At the time, uncertain of her son's death, the book's dedication read: "FOR THE ROCK [her son's nickname] and the children and sugar people of NamCan." The TV series The Flying Nun, starring Sally Field, was based on this book. The sitcom was produced by Screen Gems for the ABC television network between 1967 and 1970.

Upon learning of their son's fate, Ríos and her husband tried to find out what they could about the circumstances surrounding his death. She went to Paris in the late 1960s, trying unsuccessfully to see the North Vietnamese delegation as it arrived for peace talks. Ríos expressed her frustration and anguish in poems and in unpublished novels.

== Final years ==
Ríos was presented with a Special Forces patch and unit membership certificate. In 1970, a movement to award her son the Medal of Honor failed and instead Ríos and her husband were presented with their son's Silver Star. Her husband Colonel Humbert Joseph Versace died on June 12, 1972.

Ríos returned to Puerto Rico in 1990, retiring in the town of Fajardo. In 1999, she was diagnosed with lung cancer and she left the island to return to the mainland. She was hospitalized in Sarasota, Florida. Marie Teresa Rios died on October 17, 1999, and her funeral was held at the Ft. Myer Old Post Chapel. Representatives of the Special Operations Command from Fort Bragg were present. Her ashes were buried with her husband at Arlington National Cemetery on November 12, 1999. She was survived by her four children Dr. Stephen, Richard (former coach of the Indiana Pacers), Michael and Trilby Versace.

On July 8, 2002, President George W. Bush presented Marie Teresa Ríos's surviving children with the Medal of Honor which was posthumously awarded to Captain Humbert Roque Versace.

== Bibliography ==
- An Angel Grows Up (1957)
- Brother Angel, Academy Guild Press (1963)
- The Fifteenth Pelican, Avon Camelot (1966)

== See also ==
- List of Puerto Rican writers
- Puerto Rican literature
- Puerto Rican women in the military
- Irish immigration to Puerto Rico
- History of women in Puerto Rico
