= Madeleine Sherwood =

Canadian actress (1922–2016)

- Sherwood in The Flying Nun, 1968
- Born: Madeleine Louise Hélène Thornton; November 13, 1922; Montreal, Quebec, Canada
- Died: April 23, 2016 (aged 93); Saint-Hippolyte, Quebec, Canada
- Occupation: Actress
- Years active: 1933–1989
- Spouse: Robert Sherwood (m. 1940, divorced)
- Children: 1

Madeleine Sherwood (born Madeleine Louise Hélène Thornton; November 13, 1922 – April 23, 2016) was a Canadian actress of stage, film and television. She portrayed Mae/Sister Woman and Miss Lucy in both the Broadway and film versions of Tennessee Williams' Cat on a Hot Tin Roof and Sweet Bird of Youth, and starred or featured in 18 original Broadway productions including Arturo Ui, Do I Hear a Waltz? and The Crucible. In 1963 she won an Obie Award for Best Actress for her performance in Hey You, Light Man! Off-Broadway. In television, she played Reverend Mother Placido to Sally Field's Sister Bertrille in The Flying Nun (1967–70).

== Early life ==
Sherwood was born in Montreal, Quebec, the granddaughter of the Dean of Dentistry at McGill University. She made her first stage appearance at age four in a church Passion Play. She started her professional career in Montreal when Rupert Kaplan cast her in CBC dramas and soap operas.

== Career ==
Sherwood moved to New York City in 1950 and made her first Broadway appearance in Horton Foote's The Chase, replacing Kim Stanley. In 1953 she originated the role of Abigail in Arthur Miller's The Crucible. Elia Kazan cast her as Mae/Sister Woman in Cat on a Hot Tin Roof (1954) and as Miss Lucy in Sweet Bird of Youth (1959), both by Tennessee Williams. She reprised both roles in the film versions. She became a member of the Actors Studio in 1957 working with Lee Strasberg and was a life member of the Studio.

Sherwood appeared in many soap operas over the years, most notably on Guiding Light as Mrs. Eilers and The Secret Storm as diner owner Carmen. She had cameos on All My Children as a bag lady and Another World as a befuddled matron, returning to Guiding Light briefly as Roxie Shayne's madame, Diamond Lil. She was featured in one of the last episodes of Capitol.. Sherwood also played Reverend Mother Placido in the comedy TV series The Flying Nun.

== Personal life ==
Sherwood was blacklisted during the McCarthy era. Active in the civil rights movement, she worked with Martin Luther King Jr. in the late 1950s and 1960s and went south to join the Congress of Racial Equality (CORE). In May, 1963, she was arrested while participating in a Freedom Walk in Gadsden, Alabama, jailed, and sentenced to six months hard labor, for "[E]ndangering the Customs and Mores of the People of Alabama".

During the 1980s, she received a grant from the American Film Institute as one of the first women to direct short films for that organization (along with Cicely Tyson, Joanne Woodward, and others). She wrote, directed and acted in her film, Good Night, Sweet Prince, which received excellent notices.

In the 1970s, she met Gloria Steinem, Betty Friedan and other activists at the First Women’s Sexual Conference at Barnard College in New York City. From there, she started consciousness-raising groups and counseling workshops for Women and Incest.

In the early 1990s, she returned to Canada and resettled in Victoria, British Columbia, and Saint-Hippolyte, Quebec. She had been a long-term permanent resident of the United States, but remained a Canadian citizen all her life. She was a member of the Society of Friends (Quakers).

=== Death ===
Sherwood died on April 23, 2016, at her childhood home in Lac Cornu, Quebec. No cause of death was disclosed. She was survived by her daughter.

== Original Broadway productions ==
- The Chase
- The Crucible
- Cat on a Hot Tin Roof
- Sweet Bird of Youth
- The Night of the Iguana (succeeded Bette Davis)
- Invitation to a March
- Arturo Ui
- Do I Hear a Waltz?
- Inadmissible Evidence
- All Over

== Off-Broadway – original productions ==
- Getting Out
- Hey You, Light Man
- Brecht on Becket
- Older People (at Joseph Papp’s Public Theater)

== Selected film and television roles ==
- Baby Doll (1956) as Nurse in Doctor's Office (uncredited)
- Decoy (1957) (Season 1, Episode 8: "Escape into Danger") as Mary Woleski
- Cat on a Hot Tin Roof (1958) as Mae Flynn Pollitt
- Parrish (1961) as Addie
- Alfred Hitchcock Presents (1961) (Season 6 Episode 37: "Make My Death Bed") as Jackie Darby
- Sweet Bird of Youth (1962) as Miss Lucy
- In the Cool of the Day (1963) as Party Hostess (uncredited)
- The Fugitive (1963) (Season 1 Episode 2: "The Witch") as Mrs. Ammory
- The Edge of Night (1964) (Season 1 Episode 1.2280) as Ann Kelly #1
- The Fugitive (1964) (Season 2 Episode 14: "Devil's Carnival") as Mary Beth Thompson
- Hurry Sundown (1967) as Eula Purcell
- The Flying Nun (1967–1970) (TV Series) (81 episodes) as Reverend Mother Superior Lydia Placido
- Pendulum (1969) as Eileen Sanderson
- The Guiding Light (1970–1971, TV Series) as Betty Eiler
- The Manhunter (1972, TV Movie) as Ma Bocock
- The Secret Storm (1972–1973, TV Series) as Carmen
- Wicked, Wicked (1973) as Lenore Karadyne
- Columbo (1974) (Season 4 Episode 3: "By Dawn's Early Light") as Miss Brady
- Rich Man, Poor Man Book II (1976) (Season 1 Episode 7: Chapter VII) as Mrs. Hunt
- Rich Man, Poor Man Book II (1976) (Season 1 Episode 8: Chapter VIII) as Mrs. Hunt
- The Changeling (1980) as Mrs. Norman
- One Life to Live (1980) as Bridget Leander
- Resurrection (1980) as Ruth
- The Electric Grandmother (1982, TV Movie) as Aunt Clara
- Teachers (1984) as Grace Wensel
- Nobody's Child (1986, TV Movie) as Nurse Rhonda
- The Morning Man (1986)
- Silence Like Glass (1989) as Grandmother
- An Unremarkable Life (1989) as Louise
- Married... with Children (1993) (Season 7 Episode 19: "Go for the Old") as Joanne
