= Marge Redmond =

American actress and singer (1924–2020)

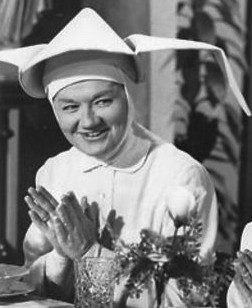
- Redmond as Sister Jacqueline in a publicity photo for The Flying Nun
- Born: December 14, 1924; Cleveland, Ohio, U.S.
- Died: February 10, 2020 (aged 95)
- Other names: Marjory Redmond, Margery Redmond
- Occupations: Actress, singer
- Years active: 1959–2007
- Spouse(s): Jack Weston (m. 1950; div. 198?)

Marjorie Redmond (December 14, 1924 – February 10, 2020) was an American actress and singer.

== Early life ==
Marjorie Redmond was born in Cleveland, Ohio in December 1924 and was raised in Lakewood by J.V. Redmond, a fire chief, and his wife, Margaret. She first ventured into acting as a member of her high school's drama group, Barnstormers. After graduation, she worked in a bank as a typist and a mail page.

== On television ==
Redmond may be best known as Sister Jacqueline in The Flying Nun, which aired on ABC from 1967-70. She was nominated for an Emmy for Outstanding Supporting Actress in a Comedy Series for her role as Sister Jacqueline during the 1967-68 season. She made guest appearances on television programs including Ben Casey (1962) and Law & Order (1997). She made a guest appearance on Perry Mason in 1965 as Henrietta Hull in "The Case of the Mischievous Doll". Other credits include a recurring role as Mrs. McCardle in Matlock, two appearances (as different characters) on The Munsters, and one-time appearances on Barnaby Jones; Family; Quincy, M.E.; The Cosby Show; The Sandy Duncan Show; Ryan's Hope; The Donna Reed Show; The Rockford Files; Murphy Brown; Mama's Family; Married... with Children; The Twilight Zone; The Practice; My Favorite Martian; and others.

Redmond was also well known for her portrayal of sage innkeeper Sarah Tucker in a series of television commercials for Cool Whip during the 1970s.

== On film ==
Films in which Redmond appeared include The Trouble with Angels (1966), Billy Wilder's The Fortune Cookie (1966), Alfred Hitchcock's Family Plot (1976) and Woody Allen's Manhattan Murder Mystery (1993).

== On stage ==
Redmond's first professional work in acting was with musicals performed by stock companies in the Cleveland area.

Beyond that, her theatrical experience ranges from appearing with Nancy Walker in the 1955 revue Phoenix '55 to understudying both Judy Holliday in Bells Are Ringing, and, many years later, Angela Lansbury in the original Broadway production of Stephen Sondheim's Sweeney Todd. (Coincidentally, she parodied Lansbury's Jessica Fletcher character on a 1988 episode of Hunter, entitled "Murder, He Wrote".)

She played a supporting role in the 1981 Broadway production of Ronald Harwood's The Dresser, which starred Tom Courtenay. In 1999, Redmond appeared Off-Broadway in playwright Joan Vail Thorne's comedy The Exact Center of the Universe. The Village Voice noted Redmond's presence among the "old pros" in the cast, calling Redmond's performance "solid and funny".

== Personal life ==
Redmond was the first wife of actor Jack Weston, with whom she developed her acting craft at the Cleveland Play House after they married in 1950. Their Hollywood years began in 1958 when they abruptly quit their parts in the hit Broadway musical, Bells Are Ringing, and left for Los Angeles "in a vintage Volkswagen", fully expecting to have to return to New York. They stayed in Los Angeles together for 18 years as both attained success in television. The couple later divorced. Redmond never remarried.

== Death ==
Redmond died in February 2020 at the age of 95. Her death was not publicly announced until May.

== Partial filmography ==
- Sanctuary (1961) - Flossie
- The Disorderly Orderly (1964) - Nurse (uncredited)
- The Trouble with Angels (1966) - Sister Liguori
- The Fortune Cookie (1966) - Charlotte Gingrich
- Banning (1967) - Marcie (uncredited)
- Adam at 6 A.M. (1970) - Cleo
- Johnny Got His Gun (1971) - First Nurse
- Family Plot (1976) - Vera Hannagan
- Hear No Evil (1993) - Mrs. Kendall
- Manhattan Murder Mystery (1993) - Mrs. Dalton
