= The Flying Nun =

American fantasy sitcom (1967–1970)

- Genre: Sitcom
- Created by: Max Wylie; Harry Ackerman
- Based on: The Fifteenth Pelican by Tere Ríos
- Developed by: Bernard Slade
- Starring: Sally Field; Madeleine Sherwood; Marge Redmond; Shelley Morrison; Alejandro Rey; Linda Dangcil; Vito Scotti
- Theme music composer: Dominic Frontiere
- Opening theme: "Who Needs Wings to Fly?"
- Composers: Dominic Frontiere; Warren Barker; Harry Geller; Hugo Montenegro; Will Schaefer
- Country of origin: United States
- Original language: English
- No. of seasons: 3
- No. of episodes: 82 (list of episodes)

Production
- Executive producer: Harry Ackerman
- Producers: Jon Epstein; Ed Jurist; William Sackheim
- Running time: 25 minutes
- Production company: Screen Gems

Original release
- Network: ABC
- Release: September 7, 1967 – April 3, 1970

The Flying Nun is an American fantasy sitcom television series about a community of nuns, which included one who could fly when the wind caught her cornette. It was produced by Screen Gems for ABC based on the 1965 book The Fifteenth Pelican, written by Tere Ríos. Sally Field starred as the title character, Sister Bertrille.

The series originally ran on ABC from September 7, 1967, to April 3, 1970, producing 82 episodes, including a one-hour pilot episode.

== Overview ==
Developed by Bernard Slade, the series centered on the adventures of a community of nuns in the Convent San Tanco in San Juan, Puerto Rico. It focuses on Sister Bertrille, a young, idealistic novice nun who discovers she can fly, whose order teaches largely underprivileged and orphaned children and assists the poor of a Puerto Rican community (a rare setting for American network television of the era).

In the hour-long series pilot, Chicago native Elsie Ethrington arrives in San Juan from New York City after her arrest for having been involved in a free speech protest; she then adopts the name of Sister Bertrille. It is also later learned (in the episode "My Sister, The Sister") that she comes from a family of physicians, and that she is the only one who did not follow in their footsteps. She instead became a nun, breaking up with her toy-salesman boyfriend and joining the Convent San Tanco after being impressed by her aunt's missionary work.

Sister Bertrille could be relied upon to solve any problem that came her way by her ability to catch a passing breeze and fly. This was generally attributed to her weighing under 90 pounds (41 kg), high winds at the convent high on the ocean bluffs, and the large, heavily starched cornette that was the headpiece for her habit. (The cornette was based on one worn until the mid-1960s by the Daughters of Charity, although Sister Bertrille was never said to belong to that order. The order which included the Convent San Tanco was never actually specified in the series.) Her flying talents could cause as many problems as they solved, per the sitcom format, but she most often used her gift to help people, or at least with good intentions.

She explains her ability to fly by stating, "When lift plus thrust is greater than load plus drag, anything can fly." In one episode, she tries to gain weight so she can stay grounded, but the attempt fails. Additionally, in the first-season episode "Young Man with a Cornette," she specifically tells a young boy who intended to use her cornette to fly that there were many factors other than her weight (which was distributed differently from that of the boy) that made her flying possible. She was unable to take off when heavy rains caused her starched cornette to lose its shape, when she had to wear something that would keep her grounded at all times, or, on one occasion in the episode titled "The Flying Dodo", when an inner ear infection caused her to lose her balance.

For a series often accused of being outlandish, The Flying Nun treated Sister Bertrille's gift of flight more realistically than other fantasy comedies of the era. On other such series of the period, there were elaborate, often frantic attempts to hide and keep secret the special powers, a constant dilemma on Bewitched, I Dream of Jeannie and My Favorite Martian. In most cases, The Flying Nun dealt with its premise more logically. Quite often, Sister Bertrille and the nuns freely admitted her ability to fly, asking for discretion in hopes that it would not draw attention from the needs and efforts of the convent. Secrecy was necessary (and occasionally humorously so) only for any characters who would not understand, or might make the situation exploitative, widely public, subject to ridicule, or otherwise disruptive.

One episode (without a laugh track) featured two actors, Sally Field and actor/director Henry Jaglom, trapped in a cave in an exchange. Upon learning she could fly so she could rescue them, he began to reconsider his perspective on life.

== Cast ==
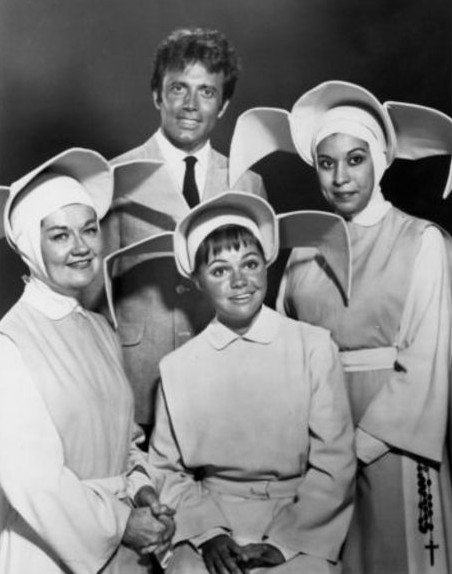
Redmond, Rey, Morrison, and Field. Missing from picture: Sherwood.

- Sally Field as Sister Bertrille/Elsie Ethrington, a novice nun who weighs only 90 pounds, allowing her to fly while wearing her cornette and when the wind is right. This was Field's second situation-comedy role, following Gidget.
- Madeleine Sherwood as Reverend Mother Placido, the somber but gentle woman who runs the convent.
- Marge Redmond as Sister Jacqueline, a wise nun with a sense of humor and Sister Bertrille's friend. Her voice is also heard as the narrator, who provides a friendly, tongue-in-cheek narration throughout each episode.
- Alejandro Rey as Carlos Ramirez, a local casino owner and playboy. His reputation makes him an unlikely philanthropist, but after seeing Sister Bertrille flying alongside his plane while he is on a date with a beautiful woman, he feels that he has had a 'religious experience' and asks the pilot to turn the plane around so that he can immediately donate his land to the convent for a new school. He is often swept, usually against his will, into Sister Bertrille's zany schemes, which she concocts with alarming frequency. Rey also appeared in a dual role in two episodes as Carlos's mild-mannered, inventive but naive cousin Luis Ramirez.
- Shelley Morrison as Sister Sixto, a Puerto Rican nun who always misinterprets English slang. In the third season, after someone corrected her, she replied with a rejoinder with logic for the phrase.
- Linda Dangcil as Sister Ana, another young novice.
- Vito Scotti as Captain Gaspar Fomento, the local police officer and the only regular character in the series who never knew about Sister Bertrille's ability to fly. In season one, episode 1 he played the role of Captain Lopez.
- Elinor Donahue as Jennifer Ethrington, Sister Bertrille's sister, a dedicated, if overscheduled, pediatrician. Jennifer politely declined Carlos' proposal of marriage and eventually married a doctor.
- Rich Little as Brother Paul, a brilliant but disaster-prone monk.
- Don Diamond as Dr. Tapia, San Tanco's local physician (season one) and Chief Galindo, Captain Fomento's long-suffering superior.
- Michael Pataki as Sgt. Salazar, sidekick to Captain Fomento (season two); Roberto, Carlo's good-natured assistant (season three); and Pedro (season one).

== Production ==
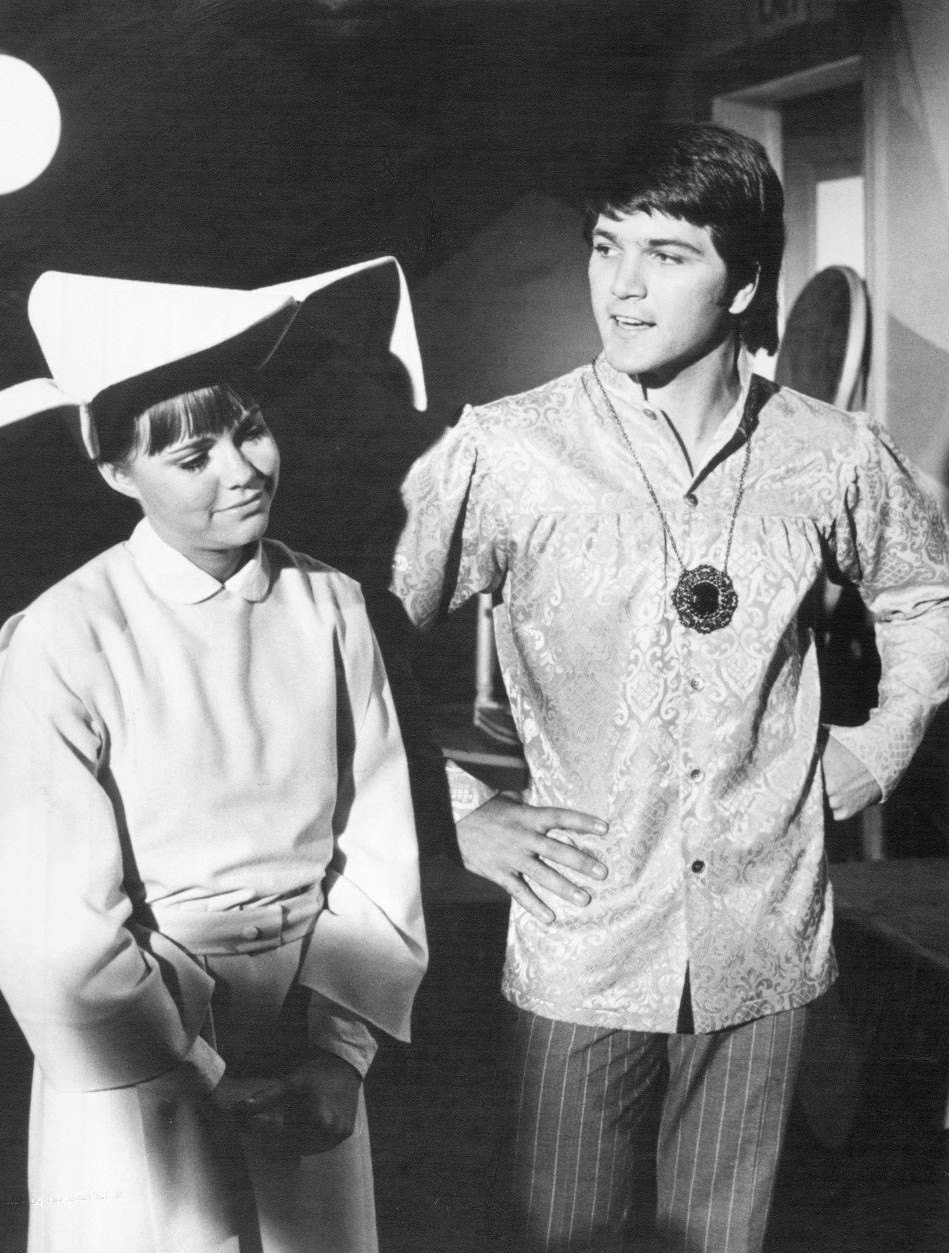
Paul Petersen with Field in The Flying Nun episode "Song of Bertrille" (1968)

After the cancellation of ABC's Gidget, starring Sally Field in the title role, producers sought a way to keep Field on the air. As a result, The Flying Nun was developed. Seeking more mature roles, Field found the concept of the show ridiculous and refused the role at first, only to reconsider after her stepfather Jock Mahoney warned her that she might not work again in show business if she did not accept the role.

Screen Gems dismissed its second choice, Ronne Troup, who had already begun filming the pilot.

Field recalled hanging from a crane and being humiliated by a parade of episodic television directors, one of whom grabbed her shoulders and moved her into position as if she were a prop. She credits co-star Madeleine Sherwood for encouraging her to enroll in acting classes. Field commented that she has great affection for her young Gidget persona and was proud of her work on that show, but confirmed she did not enjoy her time on The Flying Nun, due to regular jokes from comedians, unflattering spoofs, and negative press that ridiculed the premise, which she took to mean herself. The title was used as a punchline without considering the series or its leads.

In a season one DVD interview, Field states that it was Harry Ackerman's decision to give the series the instantly mockable but easily marketable title, "The Flying Nun" rather than give it the book's title, "The Fifteenth Pelican". Field expressed great affection for Flying Nun co-stars, including Marge Redmond and Alejandro Rey, who she said was considerate and taught her by example to speak up for herself, indicating that The Flying Nun ultimately was a tough but crucial training ground for the career that was to unfold before her.

Prior to the production of The Flying Nun, producers were concerned with how the series would be received by the Catholic Church as well as individual Catholics. In an effort to prevent religious criticism, the National Catholic Office for Radio and Television (NCORT) served as a series adviser, with on-screen credit. The NCORT, like its motion-picture counterpart, the National Catholic Office for Motion Pictures, was ultimately absorbed into the United States Catholic Conference, and both were later merged into the Office for Film and Broadcasting of the United States Conference of Catholic Bishops, or USCCB. Due to the generally positive portrayal of the nuns' religious and social activities, the series was rarely criticized by Catholic authorities and was favorably received by many.

The San Juan convent courtyard exterior was the rear area of a house façade at the Warner Brothers Ranch's suburban street/backlot in Burbank, California, along Hollywood Way north of West Oak Street. The pilot episode and the series opening and closing credits were filmed on location in Puerto Rico. Serra Retreat Center, Malibu, has photos in one of their conference rooms stating the exterior was shot there. On September 25, 1970, the Malibu Canyon wildfire destroyed the original buildings.

The series changed comedic gears in its second season with more slapstick and broad humor, focusing on bungling police captain, Gaspar Fomento (played by Vito Scotti), as well as occasional incongruous flying scenes for Field. The series reverted to the warmer tone of the first season and more socially relevant storylines by its final season.

Throughout the entire run, most stories concerned helping people in need, community service, literacy, education and the diversity of people and their faiths. The Flying Nun was one of the few American '60s sitcoms set in a low-income ethnic community. By the third season, the series had found its footing, and the flying premise became unnecessary enough to the storylines that often the scripts would have to contrive reasons for at least one flight per episode.

Field was pregnant at the beginning of season 3. Props and scenery were used to block specific views of Field, and long shots of stunt doubles were used for the flying sequences.

Following the deaths of Shelley Morrison in 2019 and Marge Redmond in 2020, Field is the only surviving cast member of the series.

=== Music ===
Like The Donna Reed Show and The Monkees, Screen Gems made potential hit music an aspect of The Flying Nun. Under the supervision of Lester Sill, several foremost composers of the era contributed to the series, including Carole Bayer Sager, Howard Greenfield, Jack Keller, Ernie Freeman and Dominic Frontiere. Sally Field, Star of The Flying Nun, an LP recording featuring music from the series' soundtrack sung by Sally Field and the Bob Mitchell Choir, was released by Colgems in 1967. One of the songs from the album, "Felicidad (The Happiness Word)" was released as single and was heard in the pilot episode.

In addition to the album, two additional singles were released on Colgems Records: the soundtrack of Sally Field, Marge Redmond and Madeleine Sherwood of Leslie Bricusse and Anthony Newley's "Gonna Build a Mountain" from the second-season episode "Sister Socko in San Tanco" and Sally Field singing "Golden Days", a song not heard on the series.

In 1968, Abbe Lane guest starred in the second-season episode "The Organ Transplant" and performed "The Look of Love" from the feature film Casino Royale (1967).

=== Broadcast history ===
Season	Episodes	Originally released	
Season	Episodes	First released	Last released
1	30	September 7, 1967	April 11, 1968
2	26	September 26, 1968	April 10, 1969
3	26	September 17, 1969	April 3, 1970

During its first two seasons, The Flying Nun aired on Thursday nights at 8:00pm EST, where the series competed in the ratings with Daniel Boone on NBC and Cimarron Strip on CBS. The show was an instant hit, with high ratings and was declared the "hit of the season;" however, the ratings dropped as the season progressed. During its second year, the series was scheduled against Daniel Boone and Hawaii Five-O. During its final season, the series was moved to Wednesday nights at 7:30pm EST, scheduled opposite The Glen Campbell Goodtime Hour. All of the competing shows ranked higher in the ratings than The Flying Nun, which eventually led to its cancellation. During its three-year run, the series was a part of a three-show comedy block on ABC that also consisted of Bewitched and That Girl. Despite its early popularity, the show's ratings never broke the Nielsen top thirty; the final episode aired on April 3, 1970.

=== Syndication ===
Its 83 episodes have consistently attracted new audiences since its initial run. Beginning in summer 2011, the show was transmitted weekends on Antenna TV. The complete first season also became available on iTunes. In 2018, it began broadcasting on FETV on Saturday and Sunday mornings from 2-4am until it was later removed. Decades (now Catchy Comedy) has aired the show as part of their weekend binge. It was usually paired with Gidget and The Girl with Something Extra, Fields' other sitcoms. It airs on MeTV as of 2023 and debuted on Catchy Comedy as part of their regular schedule on May 26, 2025, airing early mornings at 5:30am ET.

The complete series is also available on Tubi and Amazon Prime streaming services.

== Awards ==
Despite the show being an easy target for critics, Marge Redmond was nominated for an Emmy Award in the category of Outstanding Supporting Actress in a Comedy Series for her role as Sister Jacqueline during the 1967–68 season. She lost to Marion Lorne, who won posthumously for her role as "Aunt Clara" on Bewitched.

== Novels, comics and toys ==
A series of novels, all based on characters and dialog of the series, were written by William Johnston and published by Ace Books in the 1960s.

- Miracle at San Tanco 1968
- The Littlest Rebels 1968
- The Mother of Invention 1969
- The Little Green Men 1969
- The Underground Picnic 1969

In addition, the original novel was republished under the name The Flying Nun.

Dell Comics published 4 issues of a comic book based on The Flying Nun from February to November 1968. View-Master adapted the episode "Love Me, Love My Dog" into a three-reel 3-D packet with a storybook. Milton Bradley released a board game and several puzzles, and coloring books were published by Saalfield. Ray Plastic Inc. also released a rip-cord powered official Flying Nun toy.

== Home media ==
Sony Pictures Home Entertainment released the first season of The Flying Nun on March 21, 2006, on DVD in Region 1. This was followed by the release of the show's second season on DVD on August 15, 2006.

On August 27, 2013, it was announced that Mill Creek Entertainment had acquired the rights to various television series from the Sony Pictures library, including The Flying Nun. They re-released the first and second seasons in a 2-season combo pack DVD on October 7, 2014.

In Fall 2022, all 3 seasons of The Flying Nun were available on Crackle.

DVD name	Ep #	Release date
The Complete 1st Season	30	March 21, 2006; October 7, 2014 (re-release)
The Complete 2nd Season	26	August 15, 2006; October 7, 2014 (re-release)
