= Roll Out =

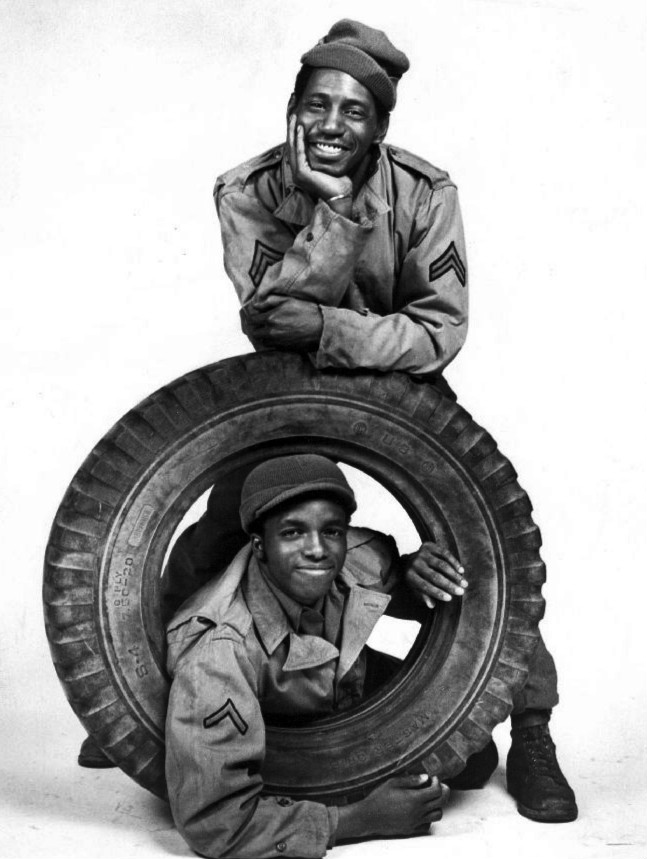
- Stu Gilliam (top) and Hilly Hicks
- Genre: Sitcom
- Created by: Larry Gelbart; Gene Reynolds
- Written by: Larry Gelbart; Gene Reynolds; Sid Dorfman; Sheldon Keller; Don Weis; John Boni; Thad Mumford; Rick Mittleman; Howard Merrill; David P. Lewis; Booker Bradshaw; Peter Meyerson
- Directed by: Gene Reynolds; Don Weis; William Wiard; Robert Butler; Bruce Bilson; Richard Kinon; E.W. Swackhamer; Simon Muntner; Don Weis; Michael Schultz; Hollingsworth Morse; Hugh Robertson
- Starring: Stu Gilliam; Hilly Hicks; Mel Stewart; Val Bisoglio; Ed Begley, Jr.
- Theme music composer: Dave Grusin
- Opening theme: Dave Grusin
- Composers: Dave Grusin; Benny Golson; J.J. Johnson
- Country of origin: United States
- Original language: English
- No. of seasons: 1
- No. of episodes: 13

Production
- Producers: Gene Reynolds; Larry Gelbart
- Cinematography: Robert C. Moreno
- Editors: Joseph Gluck; Neil Travis
- Camera setup: Single-camera
- Running time: 25 minutes
- Production company: 20th Century Fox Television

Original release
- Network: CBS
- Release: October 5, 1973 – January 4, 1974

Roll Out is an American sitcom that aired Friday evenings on CBS during the 1973–1974 television season. The series was headlined by night-club comedian Stu Gilliam (who was branching out into a television career) and Hilly Hicks; co-starring Mel Stewart, Val Bisoglio, and Ed Begley Jr.; with recurring appearances by Penny Santon, Garrett Morris, Theodore Wilson, Darrow Igus, and Rod Gist. The series was set in France during World War II and was loosely based on the 1952 film Red Ball Express.

== Overview ==
France, 1944. With the French railroad system rendered useless by the dead-on target bombing of the United States Air Corps, the advancing armies of Generals George S. Patton and Courtney Hodges were supplied their vital gasoline and millions of tons of war materiel by the dedicated drivers of the Red Ball Express.

The series chronicled the fictional 5050th Quartermaster Truck Company of the U.S. Third Army's, a company in which all of the personnel was African-American with the exception of its two commissioned officers. The stories were mainly focused on the unit's best driver, Corporal Carter "Sweet" Williams (Stu Gilliam) and his partner, PFC Jedediah "Jed" Brooks (Hilly Hicks), the unit's worst driver, and the cultural clash between the two. Sweet, a city slicker who hails from Harlem, is worldly, cocky, undisciplined, and highly unmilitary; Jed, a country boy from Louisiana, is naive, idealistic, and religious. Their antics, both on and off-duty, constantly has them in the crosshairs of the 5050th's senior non-commissioned office, Sergeant B. J. Bryant (Mel Stewart), who is strict, by-the-book, and has little tolerance for the "double clutchers," as he calls the drivers. The 5050th is commandeded by Captain Rocco Calvelli (Val Bisoglio), a cantankerous Italian-American who wants nothing more than to return to civilian life. Calvelli is assisted by his company clerk, Lieutenant Robert Chapman (Ed Begley Jr.), who is very thorough and efficient when it comes to paperwork, but otherwise not very bright in other areas. Other noteworthy drivers in the 5050th include Corporal "Wheels" Dawson (Garrett Morris) and his partner, High-Strung (Theodore Wilson), Jersey (Darrow Igus), and Phone Booth (Rod Gist). The 5050th set up camp in a bombed-out bar and inn in the French countryside, which was run by the elderly Madame Delacourt (Penny Santon).

== Characters ==
=== Main ===
- Corporal Carter "Sweet" Williams (Stu Gilliam) - Harlem-native Sweet Williams has established a respectable reputation as the 5050th's best driver, but has otherwise established an unsavory reputation as being a crooked goldbrick. When not delivering supplies, or transporting German prisoners-of-war, Sweet spends much of his off-duty time slacking off in the quarters he shares with his partner, Jed, or indulging in a bottle or two of wine at Madame Delacourt's. His unmilitary attitude often puts him at odds with Sergeant B.J., and his penchant for crookedness also makes him the target of distrust from many of his fellow drivers; most notably "Wheels" Dawson and High-Strung, with whom he often engages in battles of wit.
- Private First Class Jedediah "Jed" Brooks (Hilly Hicks) - A farmboy who hails from the Louisiana countryside, Jed is a gentle and kind-hearted soul who always looks on the bright side of any situation his finds himself in, and sees the good in everybody, regardless of how unscrupulous they may be. Given his naivete, sheltered life, and lack of real-world exposure, he often is teased by his worldlier peers, although he has established a genuine friendship with Sweet, regardless of their backgrounds. Jed is also very devout, giving praise to the Lord for blessing him with a new day, and even enjoys attending the nearby church, despite the services being delivered in French.
- Sergeant B.J. Bryant (Mel Stewart; Richard Ward in the pilot) - The 5050th's senior non-commissioned officer, Sergeant B.J. considers himself married to the Army, and is such a stickler for military correctness that he keeps all of his uniforms neatly pressed at all times, and even subjects himself to snap inspections, which have become topics of humor and ridicule for the drivers. His by-the-book attitude is also a source of annoyance for the rest of the camp, from the drivers who care nothing for the strict disciplinarian actions he takes against them for even minor infractions, to Captain Calvelli, who could not care less about military courtesy, despite being the unit's commanding officer. His main duty within the unit is to dispatch the drivers whenever they have runs to make, prompting him to send them off by shouting, "Roll out!"
- Captain Rocco Calvelli (Val Bisoglio) - The 5050th's incompetent and inept commanding officer who can never remember the names of any of his drivers, and often has to be reminded by his company clerk, Lieutenant Chapman - the latter of whom will often have better ideas on how to conduct camp matters, of which Calvelli will claim to have been the one who brainstormed said ideas. A proud Italian-American, Calvelli often spends his off-duty hours listen to opera albums on his phonograph, reading humor magazines, and smoking cigars. A devoted family man, he wants nothing more than for the war to end, so he can return to his beloved Irish wife, Peggy, and their four daughters, Maria-Theresa, Anna-Christina, Rose-Marie, and Molly.
- Lieutenant Robert Chapman (Ed Begley Jr.) - The 5050th's company clerk, and Captain Calvelli's second-in-command, Chapman is perhaps the one who really runs the unit. Although very thorough and efficient when it comes to conducting camp business - especially the paperwork involved with such, he is otherwise a little absent-minded when it comes to non-military matters, all of which seems to stem from his troubled childhood of being dumped in military schools by his separated parents. When not handling the unit's paperwork, Chapman spends his off-duty hours working on a book about his wartime experiences, and hopes to have his manuscript published after the war's conclusion.

=== Recurring ===
- Madame Delacourt (Penny Santon; Fifi D'Orsay in the pilot) - The properietor of a bombed-out bar and inn where the 5050th has set up their base. In addition to letting Calvelli board in the only room left intact behind the bar, she also will allow the camp personnel to enjoy an occasional bottle of wine or other liquor. She generally gets along with the personnel, but is not above tempting them with more extravagant indulgences, such as delicious food, in exchange for them obliging her with personal favors, as though the Red Ball Express is her own personal taxi and/or delivery service.
- Corporal "Wheels" Dawson and High-Strung (Garrett Morris and Theodore Wilson) - Another pair of the 5050th's notable drivers who could rival Sweet in their efficiency and driving skills, which often puts the three of them at odds with each other, with Sweet and Wheels in particular being rather hostile with each other, as Sweet will often insult Wheels for his perceived ugliness, while Wheels will often insult Sweet for his reputation for being a crook. High-Strung also lives up to his nickname for being rather hyper-active, and will often verbally vocalize sound effects, or randomly scat brief little tunes.
- Jersey (Darrow Igus) - Another one of the 5050th's drivers, Jersey is a big movie buff, often impersonating such film icons as Humphrey Bogart, John Wayne, Peter Lorre, and Walter Brennan.
- Phone Booth (Rod Gist) - Another 5050th driver who occasionally finds himself roped into Sweet's camp schemes.
- Grease (Sam Laws) - The 5050th's mess sergeant who feeds the drivers questionably edible chow.

== Production ==
In an effort to cash in on the success of M*A*S*H, CBS turned to producers Gene Reynolds and Larry Gelbart to create another military sitcom for them. As Gelbart himself mentioned in an interview with the Archive of American Television, "Knowing that M*A*S*H was on its way to being a success, what most studios do, they want to clone another one." Whereas M*A*S*H initially drew its humor from anti-war satire as social commentary on the then-raging Vietnam War (despite being set during the Korean War), Roll Out drew its humor from race relations, using World War II as its backdrop. African-American actors and characters were becoming more prominent in the television landscape following the Civil Rights Movement, although racial humor was still considered largely acceptable at the time. Many of the characters of color featured in Roll Out are depicted as jive-talking goofs, although this is not the case with all; Mel Stewart as Sergeant B.J. Bryant is depicted as a strict and by-the-book soldier who takes pride in his military career, and even looks down on the other drivers of the 5050th Truck Company for their offbeat antics. It was not just the characters of color who were affected by such depictions; while a lot of the local French villagers depicted on the show are friendly enough, even towards the drivers they meet, a language barrier is played for laughs, as the villagers attempts to communicate with the drivers in broken English results in humor mis-speakings. Italian-American Captain Calvelli is often prone to mood swings, and loud temper outbursts, with broad, animated hand gestures, all of which are stereotypes commonly associated with Italians in fictional media. Despite the humorous overtones, there were occasions where racial tension was treated seriously. In one episode, Sergeant B.J. brings his tired and hungry men into a mess tent to be fed, only for the white mess sergeant to refuse to serve them, bluntly stating, "We only serve our own, boy." Not willing to accept such indignity, Sergeant B.J. pulls a gun on the mess sergeant, who then reluctantly serves the drivers.

Like M*A*S*H, exteriors of Roll Out were filmed at 20th Century Fox's Ranch (now known as Malibu Creek State Park), while interiors were filmed on a sound stage at Fox's studio lot, which, according to Gelbart, made it easy for the crew to oversee the production of both series concurrently. Also like M*A*S*H, Roll Out was filmed as a single camera series, giving it a distinct cinematic look, which is especially evident in a lot of the footage filmed outdoors of the trucks driving through the French countryside.

Roll Out aired opposite ABC's The Odd Couple. Subsequently, Roll Out failed to win its timeslot and was canceled halfway through its sole season. It was replaced on February 8, 1974, by Good Times, a spin-off of Maude starring Esther Rolle and John Amos, which would run for six seasons. When asked the fate of Roll Out, Gelbart admitted, "It wasn't successful, I think because it wasn't as heartfelt of a premise, it was really a commercial decision that Gene [Reynolds] and I made. I don't even know what I think of that show; I know it didn't do terribly well, but it wasn't a disaster."

Interestingly, many of Roll Out's principal cast would later make memorable guest appearances on M*A*S*H. Hilly Hicks appeared in the episodes "White Gold" and "Post-Op"; in the former he appears as an aid station medic who sneaks into the 4077th's supply hut to swipe penicillin, while in the latter he appears as medic who confides in Hawkeye Pierce about the racial prejudice he faced. Val Bisoglio and Ed Begley, Jr. would both take their turns cooking for the 4077th; Bisoglio as Mess Sergeant Pernelli in "Twas the Day After Christmas", who switches places with Major Charles Emerson Winchester as part of a Boxing Day observance, and Begley, Jr. in "Too Many Cooks" as Private Paul Conway, an incredibly klutzy rifleman whose true vocation is as a cook. Theodore Wilson appears in "The General Flipped at Dawn" as a chopper pilot.

== Episodes ==
No.	Title	Directed by	Written by	Original release date	Prod. code
1	"Pilot"	Gene Reynolds	Larry Gelbart	October 5, 1973	K-701
We meet the troops of the "Red Ball Express," a mostly black Army transportation unit based in France during World War II. Sweet Williams is the unit's best driver, but somehow seems to return to camp with his truck in no condition to drive any further. When the Red Ball Express goes on an assignment to deliver military supplies for General Courtney Hicks Hodges, Madame Delacourt persuades Sweet to smuggle her nephew and niece out of their village and to someplace safer, but neglects to mention that her niece is expecting a baby, prompting Sweet and Jed to break ranks and find a safehouse to deliver the baby.
2	"Blues for B.J."	Don Weis	Sid Dorfman	October 12, 1973	K-704
During a German ambush while on an assignment the 5050th not only loses one of its trucks, but also the driver of said truck. While collecting the driver's personal effects, Sweet and Jed come across said driver's last will and testament, in which he wishes for a New Orleans-style funeral. As Sweet and Jed get to work to drum up the funds to organize such a funeral, Sergeant B.J. tries to strike up a band with himself, a few other drivers, and a pair of German POWs.
3	"Dark Victory"	Don Weis	Story by : Larry Gelbart & Gene Reynolds; Teleplay by : Larry Gelbart & Sheldon Keller	October 19, 1973	K-705
When a pair of white soldiers visit Madame Delacourt's cafe and Sweet gets to chatting with them, Jed feels put down when the soldiers seem to insinuate that they are more vital to the war effort than the supply drivers are. When Calvelli informs the drivers that General George S. Patton needs a double shipment of live mortar shells delivered to the fighting front, Jed volunteers himself and Sweet to the latter's reluctance. Along the way, Sweet does all he can to ensure that no sudden and unexpected surprises disturb the truck, lest the cargo explodes before reaching its destination.
4	"Sunday, Sweet Sunday"	William Wiard	Story by : Gene Reynolds; Teleplay by : Larry Gelbart & Sheldon Keller	October 12, 1973	K-703
It's Sunday, and longing for the Sunday mornings back home, Jed wishes to visit the church in a nearby village. He invites Sweet along with him, but Sweet declines the offer... until learning that Calvelli has granted Jed permission to take a jeep for himself. Citing Jed's poor driving skills, Sweet then offers to transport the two of them to the church himself, with the ulterior motive of driving the two of them to Paris instead for a day of wine, women, and song.
5	"Strange Bedfellows"	William Wiard	John Boni & Thad Mumford	October 26, 1973	K-707
Sweet and Jed have a falling out over their clashing personalities, with the former's swingin' and jivin' flair, and the latter's mellow, laid-back, easy-going disposition, all of which prompts Jed to move out of the quarters he shares with Sweet. Sweet relishes in his newfound freedom at first, but soon grows to miss the company of his pal, and tries to get him to move back into their quarters.
6	"Dear Rocco"	Robert Butler	Rick Mittleman	November 2, 1973	K-706
The 5050th receives mail for the first time in weeks, but the situation is messy after the truck gets caught in an explosion, and the personnel receives their mail in tatters. Calvelli finds only the bottom half of a letter from his wife, Peggy, but what he reads seems to indicate that what she sent him was a Dear John letter, which drives him into a fit of rage, and the rest of the camp into hysterics to try to find the other half of the same letter.
7	"Sweet Millions"	Bruce Bilson	Howard Merrill	November 16, 1973	K-708
While fixing a snapped belt when returning to camp, Sweet and Jed notice one-hundred dollar bills raining from a nearby tree, and upon closer inspection, Sweet discovers a small sack of money discarded on one of the branches. Deciding to keep the money for himself, Sweet uses his newfound wealth to his advantage to figuratively buy everyone else's respect and admiration. Sergeant B.J., meanwhile, is suspicious of how Sweet came into such sudden wealth, and decides to launch an investigation into the matter - with full cooperation from the military police.
8	"Members of the Wedding"	Richard Kinon	David P. Lewis and Booker Bradshaw	November 23, 1973	K-709
Theodore Johnson is one of the first African-America soldiers to achieve the rank of General; Sergeant B.J. served under him at Fort Benning when he was still a Colonel. Now stationed at Shaef Headquarters in Corbet, Sergeant B.J. wishes to have a gift of high-quality Cuban cigars delivered to General Johnson specifically by Sweet and Jed. Upon learning this, Madame Delacourt hitches a ride with them to La Loupe, where her nephew is getting married, but everyone is in for a shock when the groom is unable to attend due to being on a military mission, and Jed finds himself roped into being the stand-in groom for the nuptials.
9	"The Paper Caper"	E.W. Swackhamer	Simon Muntner	November 30, 1973	K-711
Calvelli is getting tired of receiving negative reports about the people in his command, and makes the announcement that if one more man is written up, said man will be shipped out of the unit. While on another driving assignment, Sergeant B.J. and the drivers make a pitstop for provisions, but when the mess sergeant refuses to serve them on the grounds that he only feeds his own kind, the Sergeant pulls a gun on him and orders that his men be fed. Upon witnessing this, a Major files a report about B.J. and sends it to Chapman, whereupon Sweet and the gang plan to bust into the company safe to pilfer said report before Calvelli sees it.
10	"No Wages – All Fear"	Unknown	Unknown	December 14, 1973	K-705
Jed Brooks gets completely fed up with the exuberant, over-the-top, and shady antics of Sweet. Exhausted by the drama, Jed decides to move out. Lost without his closest pal, Sweet tries to change his ways and persuade Jed to move back in.
11	"Christmas the '44"	Michael Schultz	Story by : Sid Dorfman; Teleplay by : Larry Gelbart & Sheldon Keller	December 21, 1973	K-713
It's Christmas, but only Jed seems to be in the spirit of the season, while the rest are down in the dumps to be far from home and separated from their loved ones when Christmas is a time to be spent with family and friends. Their spirits are lifted, however, when a local French priest brings a group of orphans to carol for them. Everyone's spirits drop, however, when it's discovered that a pair of the children have stolen one of the trucks, for which Calvelli is financially liable for.
12	"Honor Truck"	Hollingsworth Morse	Larry Gelbart & Sheldon Keller	December 28, 1973	K-712
Calvelli is tired with the drivers slacking in their duties when it comes to maintaining their trucks, and after Chapman suggests offering the drivers an incentive to keep their trucks in peak operational condition, the Honor Truck program is initiated; whichever driver receives the highest points will win a weekend pass to Paris. While this does perk up the drivers and drives them to ensure their trucks are in tip-top shape, it doesn't take long for Sweet to try to sabotage the other drivers to better his own chances at winning the Honor Truck.
13	"Didn't He Ramble?"	Hugh Robertson	Peter Meyerson	January 4, 1974	K-710
After Sweet sprains his ankle, he receives a notice from the Army that he is to be honorably discharged for his grievous wounds. He is elated to return to civilian life, but when Sergeant B.J. returns from an assignment and reports that Jed is missing in action after taking on enemy fire from the Germans, Sweet re-enlists so he can go out and search for his partner.
