= Sandy Hackett =

American actor (born 1956)

- Born: Sandy Zade Hackett; June 18, 1956 (age 70)
- Occupations: Actor; comedian; producer
- Years active: 1967–present
- Spouse: Lisa Miller (m. 2005)
- Children: 2 (Note: One biological child and one step-child.)
- Father: Buddy Hackett
- Relatives: Ron Miller (father-in-law)
- Website: www.sandyhackett.com

Sandy Zade Hackett (born June 18, 1956) is an American actor, comedian, and producer.

== Filmography ==
- The Fall Guy (1983, TV Series) .... Richard, Carrie's Boyfriend
- Happy (1983, TV Movie) .... Warm-up entertainer
- Hot Dog…The Movie (1984) .... T-shirt Contest M.C.
- Cannonball Run II (1984) .... Official
- Stitches (1985) .... Student #3
- Hamburger: The Motion Picture (1986) .... Fred Domino
- Joan Rivers and Friends Salute Heidi Abromowitz (1988, TV Special) .... Himself
- Ex-Cop (1993) .... Ronny Witherspoon
- Deadly Games (1996, TV Series) .... Mr. Spencer
- The Nanny (1996–1998, TV Series) .... Rabbi Margulies / Rabbi
- Lovers and Liars (1998) .... Frank
- Jack of Hearts (2000) .... Benny
- The S.I.N. (2001, Video) .... Bud Chelzer
- Las Vegas (2003, TV Series) .... Surveillance #1
- Down and Derby (2005) .... Larry Savage
- The Indie Pendant (2005) .... Roy Patterson
- Hold It Like a Baby (2007) .... Fernando
- The Portal (2010) .... Dr. Mulag
