= Bridget Hanley =

American actress (1941–2021)

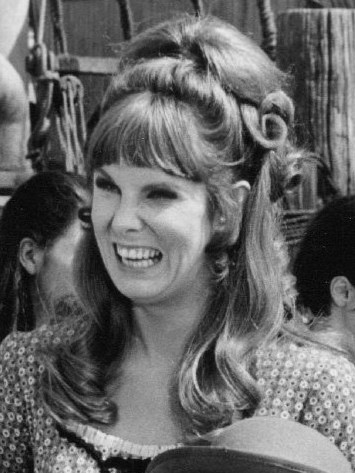
- Hanley in TV's Here Come the Brides (1969)
- Born: Bridget Hanley; February 3, 1941; Minneapolis, Minnesota, U.S.
- Died: December 15, 2021 (aged 80); Woodland Hills, California, U.S.
- Occupation: Actress
- Years active: 1965–2010
- Spouse: E. W. Swackhamer (m. 1969; died 1994)
- Children: 2

Bridget Hanley (February 3, 1941 – December 15, 2021) was an American actress, known for her starring and supporting roles in TV comedy, western, adventure, and drama programs, including as Candy Pruitt in the Western dramedy series Here Come the Brides. She also starred in Harper Valley PTA as Wanda Reilly Taylor.

== Early life ==
Born on February 3, 1941, in Minneapolis, Minnesota, Hanley was the daughter of Leland "Lee" Hanley, an All-American football player at Northwestern University and United States Marine Corps veteran, and Doris "Dorie" Hanley (née Nihlroos). At the age of four, she moved with her parents and older sister Mary-Jo to Edmonds, Washington, north of Seattle, where her younger sister Molly was later born. After graduating from Edmonds High School, Hanley headed to the San Francisco College for Women to study drama for two years, then on to University of Washington where she graduated in 1962 with honors and a B.A. in drama, having appeared in 17 major productions, ranging from Shakespeare to Arthur Miller.

== Career ==
=== Early career ===
Hanley began her acting career in San Francisco, where she worked days as a secretary at an advertising agency for $50 a week while auditioning for roles in repertory theater. When she landed the lead female role of Robin in a touring company production of The Trials of Arvid "Tickles" Yastrzemski, her weekly salary doubled. She played the role for almost four years in theaters in San Francisco, San Diego, Los Angeles and Hollywood, until Screen Gems signed her to a contract in 1966.

Screen Gems' publicity materials described Hanley as a "young Maureen O'Hara."

Hanley's first credited TV role was in the sitcom Hank in 1965, playing Terry in the episode "My Fair Co-Ed". That was followed by credited appearances on numerous Screen Gems television series, including Gidget, The Farmer's Daughter, Love on a Rooftop, Bewitched, I Dream of Jeannie and The Flying Nun. While working at Screen Gems, Hanley met director/producer E. W. Swackhamer, whom she later married. She also made several pilots for Screen Gems, including her first lead role in the series Here Come the Brides.

=== Here Come the Brides ===
Hanley played the female lead role of Candy Pruitt in the series Here Come the Brides, which premiered on September 25, 1968. According to the show's producers in an interview with L.A. Times TV critic Cecil Smith, it was inspired by the movie Seven Brides for Seven Brothers, and loosely based upon the true story of Asa Mercer's efforts in the 1860s to relocate single women from the East Coast to what was then the frontier logging outpost of Seattle. The show's theme song, "Seattle," was recorded by Perry Como, who enjoyed some chart success with it. Hanley's character was the love interest of Jeremy Bolt, played by teen heartthrob Bobby Sherman; Sherman's reinterpretation of "Seattle" was not as successful as Como's version had been.

=== Harper Valley PTA ===
Harper Valley PTA is an early 1980s American television sitcom based on the 1978 film Harper Valley PTA, which was in turn based on the 1968 song recorded by country music singer Jeannie C. Riley, written by Tom T. Hall. The series stars Barbara Eden as Stella Johnson, a door-to-door saleswoman and single mother living in the fictional town of Harper Valley, Ohio, who is trying to make ends meet and raise her daughter Dee following the loss of her husband. The PTA of Harper Valley Junior High School, egged on by its socialite president, Flora Simpson Reilly (Anne Francine), takes a dim view of Mrs. Johnson's flouting of the small town's conventions. Hanley's character, Wanda Reilly Taylor, is a member of the snooty family that tries to rule Harper Valley.

=== Later career ===
Hanley was an active performer at Theatre West, an internationally acclaimed non-profit arts organization in Hollywood, California. Established in 1962, Theatre West is the oldest continually running theatre company in Los Angeles.

She appeared on the television comedy Mama's Family, and in an episode of the crime drama series Murder, She Wrote as the wife of a serial cheating husband.

Middletown Productions created and produced May Day Sermon, a one-woman play starring Hanley, based on the poem by James Dickey. Hanley later starred in Bronwen, the Traw and the Shapeshifter, also based on a James Dickey poem.

Hanley was a guest lecturer and performer at Radford University.

== Personal life ==
Hanley married Egbert Warnderink (E. W.) Swackhamer, Jr., a producer and director of Here Come the Brides, on April 26, 1969. Together they had two daughters, Bronwyn and Megan. Swackhamer died in 1994.

With the support of community members and fans, Hanley and her sisters successfully led a drive to save the Ganahl-Hanley log cabin in Edmonds, Washington. The cabin, originally built in 1929, was donated by Hanley's parents in 1975 and painstakingly moved two miles from its original location to downtown Edmonds, next to the historical museum, where it was dedicated as the city's Chamber of Commerce and Visitors Center in 1976. After falling into disrepair over the next two decades, the cabin was fully restored and rededicated on November 18, 2000.

Having earlier been diagnosed with Alzheimer's disease, Hanley died on December 15, 2021, at the Motion Picture Country Home in Woodland Hills, California.

== Partial filmography ==
- Hangin' with Mr. Cooper (1 episode, 1994)
- Family Matters (1 episode, 1993)
- Adam-12 (1 episode, 1991)
- Columbo (1990)
- Murder, She Wrote (1 episode, 1990)
- Simon & Simon (2 episodes, 1982–1988)
- Trial by Jury (1987)
- Chattanooga Choo Choo (1984) (/Movie)
- Mama's Family (1 episode, 1983)
- Malibu (1983) (TV miniseries)
- Harper Valley PTA (30 episodes, 1981–1982) (TV)
- Reward (1980)
- Breaking Up Is Hard to Do (1979)
- CHiPs (1 episode, 1978)
- How the West Was Won (1977) TV mini-series
- Emergency! (1 episode, 1976)
- Spencer's Pilots (1 episode, 1976)
- Bell, Book and Candle (1976)
- Welcome Back, Kotter (1 episode, 1975)
- The Rookies (1 episode, 1974)
- Owen Marshall: Counselor at Law (1 episode, 1973)
- Love, American Style (5 episodes, 1970–1973)
- Adam-12 (1 episode, 1973)
- Ghost Story (1 episode, 1973)
- Cade's County (1 episode, 1972)
- Julia (1 episode, 1971)
- Nanny and the Professor (1 episode, 1970)
- The Interns (1 episode, 1970)
- The Odd Couple (1 episode, 1970)
- Here Come the Brides (52 episodes, 1968–1969)
- Mad Mad Scientist (1968) (TV)
- The Flying Nun (1 episode, 1968)
- The Second Hundred Years (1 episode, 1967)
- I Dream of Jeannie (1 episode, 1967)
- The Iron Horse (1 episode, 1967)
- Occasional Wife (1 episode, 1967)
- Bewitched (1 episode, 1966)
- Love on a Rooftop (2 episodes, 1966)
- Summer Fun (1 episode, 1966)
- The Farmer's Daughter (1 episode, 1966)
- Gidget (1 episode, 1966)
- Hank (1 episode, 1965)
