= Stu Gilliam =

American actor and comedian (1933-2013)

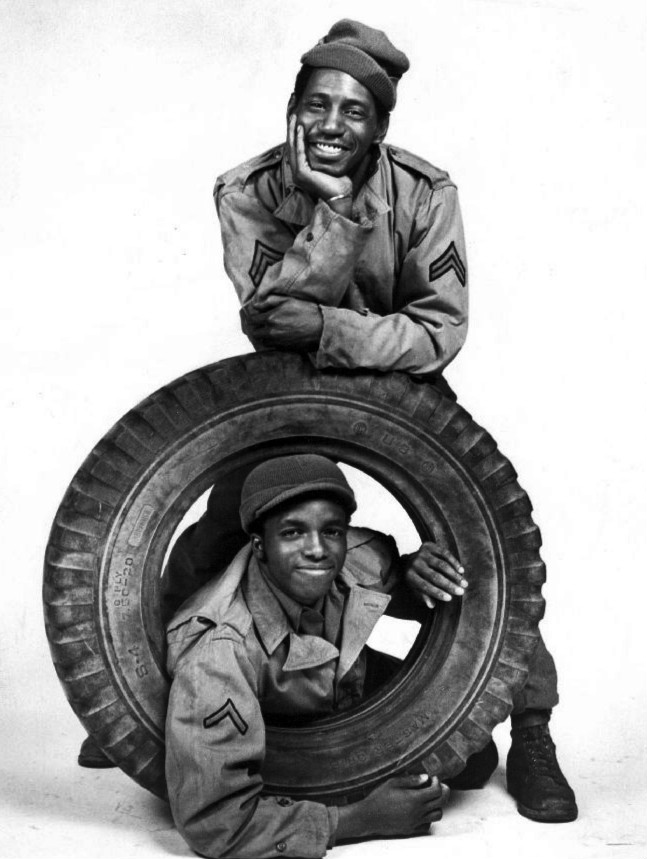
- Gilliam (top) in Roll Out, 1973 (with Hilly Hicks)
- Born: Stewart Byron Gilliam; July 27, 1933; Detroit, Michigan, U.S.
- Died: October 11, 2013 (aged 80); České Budějovice, Czech Republic
- Occupations: Actor, comedian
- Spouse: Vivian Baravalle (m. 2007)

Stewart Byron "Stu" Gilliam (July 27, 1933 – October 11, 2013) was an African-American actor and stand-up and TV comedian.

== Biography ==
Stewart Byron Gilliam was born in a middle-class area of Detroit, the grandson of a church minister. He left home at age 14 to perform with a circus as ventriloquist in state fairs, then after a few years began to appear in clubs in Chicago. During his two-year service in the Korean War, he entertained troops as a ventriloquist. In the 1950s and 1960s he performed his act in clubs nationwide with Black audiences, including the Apollo Theater in New York City. He sometimes performed for integrated audiences, but in Southern states of the U. S. he was prevented from appearing onstage at the same time as the White performers. The Playboy Club circuit changed that by booking him before largely White crowds, including in the South.

In the 1960s and 1970s Gilliam did stand-up work along with TV and film appearances. He appeared on national TV shows such as The Ed Sullivan Show, Playboy After Dark, and The Dean Martin Show. In 1968, he was paired with Don Adams and Robert Culp in Get Smart as Agent Samuels (really Kubacek, a double agent in deep disguise) in "Die, Spy", a spoof of the television series I Spy. He was the voice of Freddie "Curly" Neal on the Hanna-Barbera cartoon series Harlem Globetrotters in the early seventies. Gilliam was a panelist on the first season of the game show Match Game '73 ( episodes 41-45 and 51-56).

Gilliam co-starred in the CBS sitcom Roll Out during the 1973–74 season. Also starring Hilly Hicks, and featuring Ed Begley, Jr. and Garrett Morris, the series was set in France during World War II and was loosely based on the 1952 film Red Ball Express.

Gilliam was an active member of the Bahá'í Faith. He married Vivian Baravalle in 2007 and moved to her residence in the Czech Republic. They had one daughter, Velnita. Gilliam died of a heart attack in České Budějovice on October 11, 2013, at age 80. He had also been battling lung cancer and COPD. He is buried in Boršov nad Vltavou.
