= Here Come the Brides =

American Western television series (1968–1970)

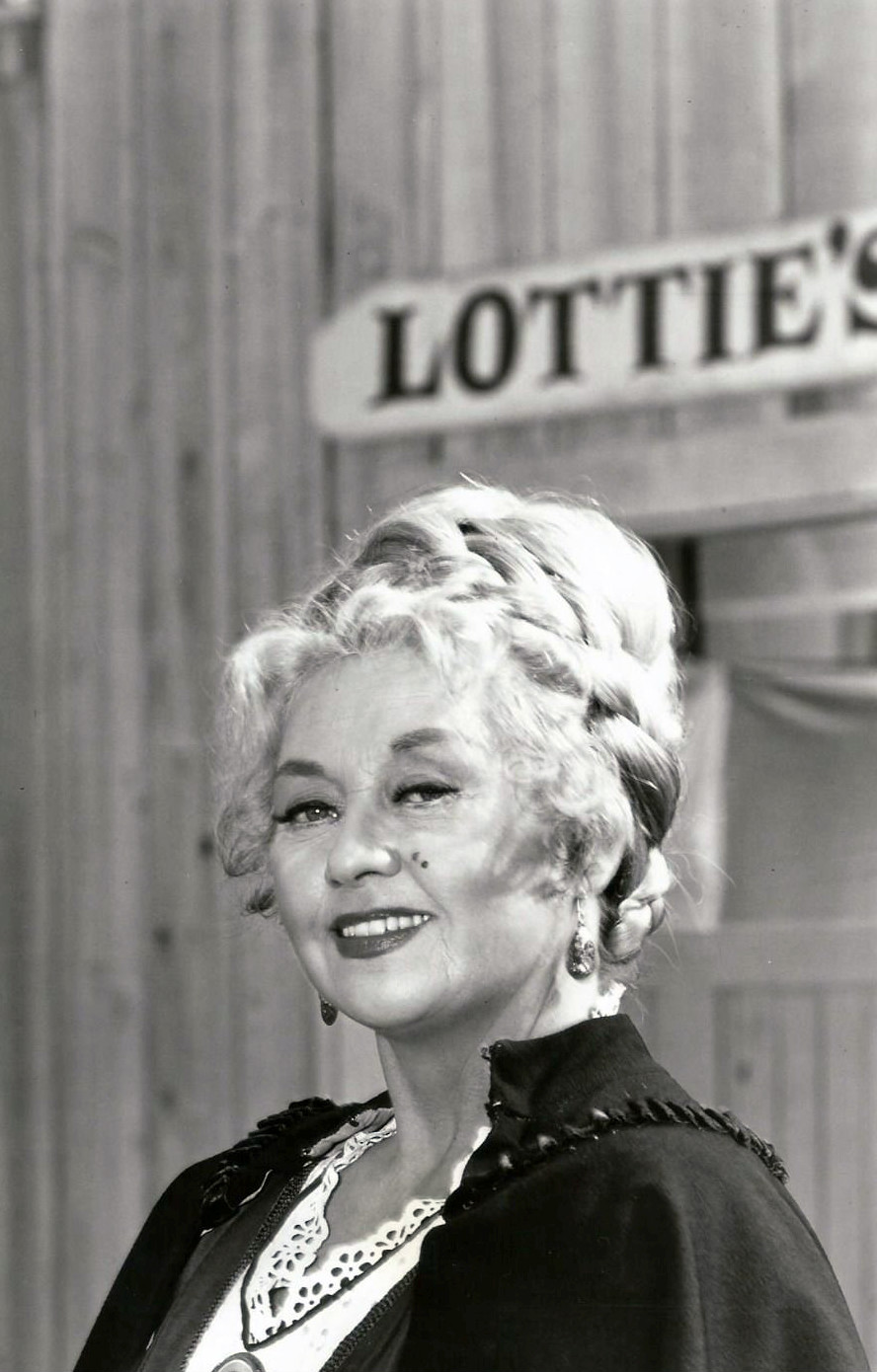
- Joan Blondell as Lottie
- Genre: Comedy; Western
- Starring: Robert Brown; David Soul; Bobby Sherman; Bridget Hanley; Mark Lenard; Joan Blondell; Henry Beckman; Susan Tolsky
- Theme music composer: Hugo Montenegro; Jack Keller; Ernie Sheldon
- Opening theme: "Seattle"
- Composers: Paul Sawtell; Shorty Rogers; Warren Barker
- Country of origin: United States
- Original language: English
- No. of seasons: 2
- No. of episodes: 52

Production
- Camera setup: Single-camera
- Running time: 60 minutes
- Production company: Screen Gems

Original release
- Network: ABC
- Release: September 25, 1968 – April 3, 1970

Here Come the Brides is an American comedy Western television series from Screen Gems that aired on the ABC television network from September 25, 1968, to April 3, 1970. It was loosely based on Asa Mercer's efforts in the 1860s to import marriageable women (the Mercer Girls) from the East Coast cities of the United States to Seattle, where there was a shortage.

== Synopsis ==
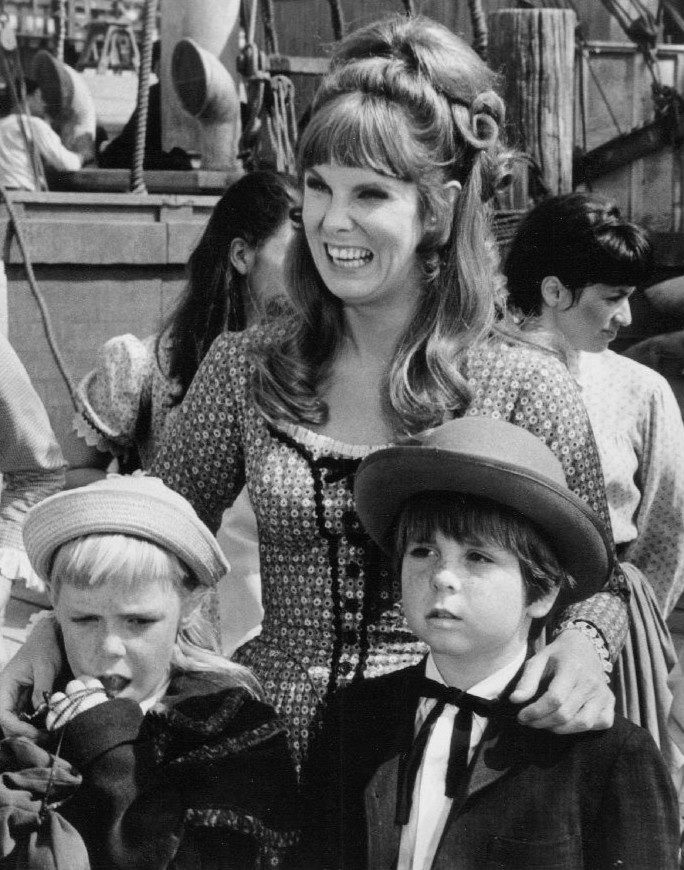
Candy's brother and sister arrive in Seattle

In the pilot episode, smooth-talking, charismatic logging company boss Jason Bolt (Robert Brown) is faced with a shutdown of his operation as lonely lumberjacks are ready to leave Seattle due to the lack of female companionship. He promises to find 100 marriageable ladies willing to come to the frontier town (population 152) and stay for a full year. Sawmill owner Aaron Stempel (Mark Lenard) puts up much of the expense money as a wager that Bolt will not succeed; the Bolt brothers bet Bridal Veil Mountain, home to their logging company.

The Bolts travel to New Bedford, Massachusetts, recruit the women, then charter a mule-ship to take them back to Seattle. Local saloon owner Lottie (Joan Blondell) takes the women under her wing and becomes a mother figure to them, while Bolt desperately works to keep the women from leaving at the next high tide.

Eventually, the women decide to give Seattle and the loggers a chance. The ship's captain, Clancy (Henry Beckman), develops a relationship with Lottie and becomes a regular character in the series.

Much of the dramatic and comedic tension in the first season revolved around Stempel's efforts to sabotage the deal so he can take over the Bolts' holdings. Stempel became more friendly in the second and final season, which focused more on the development of individual characters and the conflicts associated with newcomers and with people just passing through. One running theme is the importance of family, as the Bolt brothers show through the closeness of their relationships, that by sticking together, democratically taking family votes, they can overcome the surprising obstacles life presents.

Bobby Sherman and David Soul were propelled to pop stardom as Jason's brothers, Jeremy and Joshua. Jeremy took a prominent role, not only as the boyfriend of Candy Pruitt (Bridget Hanley), the beautiful, unofficial leader of the brides, but also as a young man with a stammer. In one episode, he is temporarily able to manage his stammer following coaching by a traveler who has come to Seattle. Upon discovering that his benefactor is actually a con artist, his faith is shaken so deeply that the stammer returns.

== Background and production ==
The producers said the show was inspired by the movie Seven Brides for Seven Brothers in an interview with LA Times TV critic Cecil Smith.

As a television Western, set shortly after the end of the Civil War, the series rarely featured any form of gunplay, and violence was generally limited to comical fistfights. This was in keeping with the restrictions on television violence at the time. Stories highlighted the importance of cooperation, inter-racial harmony, and peaceful resolution of conflict. Plots were usually a mix of drama and humor. Being one of the first shows targeted at young women, most of the humor was at the expense of the men, but not particularly bitingly so.

The 1951 movie Westward the Women follows a similar theme.

The show addressed many social issues of the 1960s — racism, ethnic discrimination, treatment of the handicapped and mentally impaired, business ethics, and ecology.

=== Music ===
The theme song "Seattle" was composed by Hugo Montenegro with lyrics by Jack Keller and Ernie Sheldon. Both Perry Como and Bobby Sherman recorded slightly different variations of the song. Como's version, recorded for his album of the same name, scored a minor hit, reaching No. 38 on the Billboard Hot 100 chart and No. 2 on the Easy Listening chart. Sherman's version, although receiving some airplay, was never released as a single. " . . . Here come the brides!" is not mentioned in either recording. Starting with the series debut in September 1968, the series opened with a rousing instrumental score featuring screen stills of "Jason", "Jeremy & Joshua", "Candy & Aaron" and "Lottie". Starting with episode 8 ("A Jew Named Sullivan") as evidenced by the end credits, and to coincide with the spring 1969 release of the Perry Como 'pop' recording, the TV theme was reworked by overdubbing vocals/lyrics to the same theme music already recorded (as used previously) along with updating all the opening character stills, including the addition of a "Clancy & Biddie" screen. The added lyrics performed by "The New Establishment" and updated screen stills were featured for the remainder of the first season and remained unchanged for the entire second season. In the beginning syndication years, the instrumental version of the opening credits was placed on all episodes. In recent years, the vocal theme of the opening credits has been restored to the second-season episodes (although with the first season screen stills).

== Cast ==
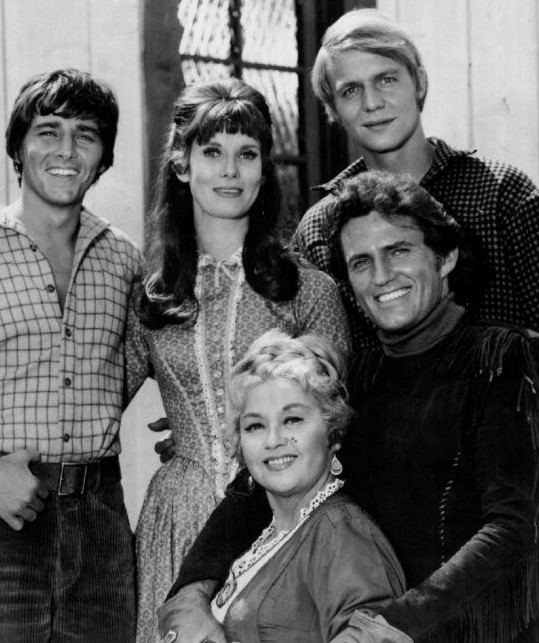
Clockwise from left: Bobby Sherman, Bridget Hanley, David Soul, Robert Brown, Joan Blondell

=== Main characters ===
First season

Opening credits sequence:

- Jason Bolt (Robert Brown)
- Jeremy Bolt (Bobby Sherman)
- Joshua Bolt (David Soul)
- Aaron Stempel (Mark Lenard)
- Candace "Candy" Pruitt (Bridget Hanley)
- Lottie Hatfield (Joan Blondell)

Ending credits:

- Captain Clancey (Henry Beckman)
- Biddie Cloom (Susan Tolsky)

Bobby Sherman, who died June 24, 2025, was the last surviving member of the main cast.

=== Recurring characters ===
- Ben Perkins (Hoke Howell)
- Corky (Robert Biheller)
- Olaf "Big Swede" Gustavsen (Bo Svenson)
- Essie Halliday (Mitzi Hoag), school teacher and eventually Big Swede's wife
- Franny (Carole Shelyne)
- Ann (Cynthia Hull)

Second season

Opening credits:

Those listed for the first season, plus

- Captain Clancey (Henry Beckman)
- Biddie Cloom (Susan Tolsky)

End credits:

- Ben Perkins (Hoke Howell)
- Corky (Robert Biheller)
- Christopher Pruitt (Eric Chase, 1969–1970), Candy Pruitt's younger brother
- Molly Pruitt (Patti Cohoon, 1969–1970), Candy's younger sister

=== Notable guest stars ===
A young Bruce Lee appeared as a Chinese immigrant named Lin in the episode "Marriage Chinese Style" (1969). This character was the only dramatic English language non-martial arts role in Lee's acting career. Character actress Nora Marlowe played Mrs. Bronson in the same episode.

Cicely Tyson, Jane Wyatt, Edward Asner, Majel Barrett, Barry Williams, Marge Redmond, Madeleine Sherwood, Bernard Fox, Vic Tayback (an extra as one of 'Jason's men' in the premiere episode, later a guest star), Lynda Day George, Bob Cummings, John Marley, Daniel J. Travanti, James B. Sikking, Larry Linville, and Billy Mumy all made guest appearances.

Mitzi Hoag, who played Miss Essie during the season 1, had two guest roles in season 2 as completely different characters, one as a Greek immigrant in the episode "Land Grant" and another as a nun in the episode "Absalom".

== Episodes ==
=== Season 1 (1968–69) ===
No. overall	No. in season	Title	Directed by	Written by	Original release date
1	1	"Pilot"	E. W. Swackhamer	N. Richard Nash	September 25, 1968
2	2	"A Crying Need"	Bob Claver	Skip Webster	October 2, 1968
3	3	"And Jason Makes Five"	E. W. Swackhamer	John O'Dea & Jay Simms	October 9, 1968
4	4	"The Man of the Family"	E. W. Swackhamer	Jo Heims	October 16, 1968
5	5	"A Hard Card to Play"	Bob Claver	William Blinn	October 23, 1968
6	6	"Letter of the Law"	Paul Junger Witt	Skip Webster	October 30, 1968
7	7	"Lovers and Wanderers"	E. W. Swackhamer	William Wood	November 6, 1968
8	8	"A Jew Named Sullivan"	Jerry Bernstein	Oliver Crawford	November 20, 1968
9	9	"The Stand Off"	James B. Clark	Story by : Don Tait; Teleplay by : Don Tait & Skip Webster	November 27, 1968
10	10	"A Man and His Magic"	Harvey Hart	Gerry Day	December 4, 1968
11	11	"A Christmas Place"	Richard Kinon	William Blinn	December 18, 1968
12	12	"After a Dream Comes Mourning"	E. W. Swackhamer	William Blinn	January 1, 1969
13	13	"The Log Jam"	Jerry Bernstein	Albert Reich	January 8, 1969
14	14	"The Firemaker"	Richard Kinon	James Amesbury	January 15, 1969
15	15	"Wives For Wakando"	Richard Kinon	Don Balluck	January 22, 1969
16	16	"A Kiss for Just So"	Jerry Bernstein	Story by : Al Beich & James Amesbury; Teleplay by : James Amesbury	January 29, 1969
17	17	"Democracy Inaction"	R. Robert Rosenbaum	William Blinn	February 5, 1969
18	18	"One Good Lie Deserves Another"	Paul Junger Witt	John O'Dea & Jay Simms	February 12, 1969
19	19	"One to a Customer"	Jerry Bernstein	John McGreevey	February 19, 1969
20	20	"A Dream That Glitters"	Herb Wallerstein	Gerry Day & Ila Limerick	February 26, 1969
21	21	"The Crimpers"	Paul Junger Witt	Don Tait	March 5, 1969
22	22	"Mr. & Mrs. J. Bolt"	Richard Kinon	Richard Bluel	March 12, 1969
23	23	"A Man's Errand"	Jerry Bernstein	Lee Oscar Bloomgarden	March 19, 1969
24	24	"Loggerheads"	Richard Kinon	Skip Webster	March 26, 1969
25	25	"Marriage Chinese Style"	Richard Kinon	Skip Webster	April 9, 1969
26	26	"The Deadly Trade"	Paul Junger Witt	William Blinn	April 16, 1969

=== Season 2 (1969–70) ===
No. overall	No. in season	Title	Directed by	Written by	Original release date
27	1	"A Far Cry from Yesterday"	Bob Claver	William Blinn	September 26, 1969
28	2	"The Wealthiest Man in Seattle"	Richard Kinon	Story by : Charles Watts & Paul Stein; Teleplay by : Charles Watts & Paul Stein & Allen Clare	October 3, 1969
29	3	"The Soldier"	Paul Junger Witt	Skip Webster	October 10, 1969
30	4	"Next Week, East Lynne"	Irving Moore	Henry Slesar	October 17, 1969
31	5	"A Wild Colonial Boy"	Paul Junger Witt	Michael Fisher	October 24, 1969
32	6	"Hosanna's Way"	Virgil W. Vogel	Rick Tobin	October 31, 1969
33	7	"The Road to the Cradle"	William F. Claxton	Ken Trevey	November 7, 1969
34	8	"The Legend of Bigfoot"	Herb Wallerstein	Richard Bluel	November 14, 1969
35	9	"Land Grant"	Virgil W. Vogel	Larry Brody	November 21, 1969
36	10	"The Eyes of London Bob"	E. W. Swackhamer	Ken Trevey	November 28, 1969
37	11	"The Fetching of Jenny"	E. W. Swackhamer	Henry Sharp	December 5, 1969
38	12	"His Sister's Keeper"	Jerry Bernstein	Skip Webster	December 12, 1969
39	13	"Lorenzo Bush"	Jerry Bernstein	Jack Miller	December 19, 1969
40	14	"Obie Brown and the Black Princess"	Richard Kinon	Bob Goodwin	December 26, 1969
41	15	"To Break the Bank in Tacoma"	Jerry Bernstein	Michael Fisher	January 16, 1970
42	16	"Debt of Honor"	Herschel Daugherty	Skip Webster	January 23, 1970
43	17	"She Bear"	William F. Claxton	Story by : Don Tait; Teleplay by : Don Tait & Allen Clare	January 30, 1970
44	18	"Another Game in Town"	Lou Antonio	Story by : Seymour Friedman & Larry Brody; Teleplay by : Larry Brody	February 6, 1970
45	19	"Candy and the Kid"	Jerry Bernstein	Daniel B. Ullman	February 13, 1970
46	20	"Two Worlds"	Lou Antonio	Jack Miller & Shelly Mitchell	February 20, 1970
47	21	"To the Victor"	Virgil W. Vogel	Skip Webster	February 27, 1970
48	22	"How Dry We Are"	Nicholas Colasanto	Roberta Goldstone	March 6, 1970
49	23	"Bolt of Kilmaron"	Nicholas Colasanto	D.C. Fontana	March 13, 1970
50	24	"Absalom"	Paul Junger Witt	Michael Fisher	March 20, 1970
51	25	"The Last Winter"	Jim Hogan	Tim Kelly	March 27, 1970
52	26	"Two Women"	E. W. Swackhamer	Jack Miller	April 3, 1970

== Release ==
=== Syndication ===
WWL-TV, the CBS affiliate in New Orleans, re-aired the series in its entirety at 8:00 pm Central on most Saturdays from October 10, 1970 through September 11, 1971. The station shifted Arnie to 5:00 pm and The Mary Tyler Moore Show to 5:30, preempting the CBS Evening News.

Reruns were aired on CBN Cable (now Freeform) during the mid-1980s.

Early in January 2011, digital sub-network Antenna TV began airing the series until it was later removed.

INSP began broadcasting a back to back 2 episode block of the series on Sunday mornings in 2018 continuing through 2020.

The Decades channel (now Catchy Comedy) aired most of the series during a weekend marathon on June 2–3, 2018; February 1–2, 2019 and again January 23–24, 2021 in widescreen format. The episodes were cropped for the widescreen presentation.

In autumn 2021, the series began airing on MeTV+ until it was removed.

In January 2022, GetTV began airing episodes in a 75-minute format on Saturday & Sunday at 11:15 am Eastern until it was removed a few years later.

The show made its debut on FETV on November 1, 2025, airing weekdays at 2:00 pm Eastern.

== Reception ==
First season ratings were impressive enough to ensure its renewal for a second season, though only 152 ABC affiliates agreed to broadcast the series, compared to another Screen Gems' series, Bewitched, which was broadcast on 217 ABC affiliates in the same 1968/69 season, prompting ABC affiliated radio and television stations to add a voice-over in all related HCTB promotional commercials inviting viewers to watch " ...Here Come the Brides!, Wednesdays at 7:30, 6:30 central, over MOST of these ABC stations!" For the second season, the family-geared series was moved from the 7:30 Wednesday night "Family Hour" to the more adult-oriented time slot of 9:00 Friday night in September 1969. This move to the Friday night death slot combined with the low ABC affiliate support caused the ratings to quickly slide out of the top 40, and production ceased in the spring of 1970, although most of those ABC affiliates repeated episodes throughout the summer months, as was then a standard procedure with most series. The final primetime episode in the United States was broadcast on Friday September 18, 1970.

Joan Blondell received Emmy Award nominations each season for her performance as Lottie Hatfield. She lost to Barbara Bain in 1969, and to Susan Hampshire in 1970.

== Media information ==
=== French version ===
A French-language version of the show and theme song (performed by a chorus of male singers) was a smash hit in French Canada, under the title Cent filles à marier (A Hundred Girls to Marry Off). The show capitalized on the popularity of the American version and the fact that a similar "bride drive" (see Filles du roi) is also part of Québec's cultural mythos.

=== Home media and books ===
Sony Pictures Home Entertainment released the first season on DVD in Region 1 on May 16, 2006.

On October 14, 2011, Shout! Factory announced that it had acquired the home-media rights to the series, and it later released the final season on DVD. It was subsequently released on February 28, 2012. However, the season 1 opening cast-and-credit sequence was used for this release, using the New Establishment's vocals, but ignoring Henry Beckman's and Susan Tolsky's respective credits.

In December 2009, BearManor Media released a nostalgic look into the program's history, Gangway, Lord: (The) Here Come The Brides Book by Jonathan Etter, which featured a foreword by Robert Brown. Bobby Sherman was the only (then) surviving cast member who did not cooperate with the author. However, Sherman did discuss the series in his autobiography, Bobby Sherman: Still Remembering You, whose contents he dictated to Dena Hill, and was subsequently published by Contemporary Books in 1996.

=== Star Trek connections ===
Barbara Hambly's Star Trek novel Ishmael has Spock traveling back to the time and place of Here Come the Brides after discovering a Klingon plot to destroy the Federation by killing Aaron Stempel (spelled "Stemple" in the book) before he could thwart an attempted 19th-century alien invasion of Earth. During most of the story, Spock has lost his memory and is cared for by Stempel, who passes him off as his nephew "Ishmael" and helps him hide his alien origins.

At the end of the story, Captain Kirk discovers that Stempel is one of Spock's mother's ancestors, a reference to the fact that Mark Lenard also played Spock's father Sarek in episodes of the original Star Trek and Star Trek: The Next Generation, as well as several of the Star Trek motion pictures. Also the same actor played descendants of Mr. Spock on his father's and his mother's sides of the family.

Majel Barrett, who played Nurse Christine Chapel in Star Trek, appeared as Tessa a dancehall woman in the first-season episode "Lovers and Wanderers".

Jane Wyatt who played Spock's mother in the original series, made a guest appearance in the final episode of the series, "Two Women". She did not have any scenes with Mark Lenard.

In addition to Lenard, other Brides actors appeared in Star Trek: Robert Brown (both of the Lazaruses in "The Alternative Factor"), David Soul (Makora in "The Apple"), and semi-regular Carole Shelyne (the visible representation of a Metron in "Arena", whose voice Vic Perrin provided in that installment).
