= Malibu (film) =

1983 television film by E.W. Swackhamer

- Title screen
- Genre: Drama
- Based on: Mailbu by William Murray
- Written by: Elliott Baker
- Directed by: E.W. Swackhamer
- Starring: Susan Dey; Kim Novak; James Coburn; Richard Mulligan; Eva Marie Saint; Troy Donahue; Chad Everett; Jenilee Harrison; Valerie Perrine; Ann Jillian; George Hamilton
- Music by: Mark Snow
- Country of origin: United States
- Original language: English

Production
- Executive producer: Robert Hamner
- Producers: Jack Leewood; Peter Thompson
- Production locations: Malibu, California; Burbank, California
- Cinematography: Robert L. Morrison
- Editor: J. Terry Williams
- Running time: 190 min.
- Production companies: Hamner Productions Inc. Columbia Pictures Television

Original release
- Network: ABC
- Release: January 23 – January 24, 1983

Malibu is a 1983 American made-for-television drama film based on a novel by William Murray. Featuring Kim Novak, Susan Dey, Troy Donahue and James Coburn, the miniseries involves a young couple from Milwaukee, who move into the fabled, high-society Malibu beach community, and become involved with the lives of the various people living in the community.

== Plot ==
=== Part 1 ===
Stan (William Atherton) and Linda (Susan Dey) Harvey are a middle-income couple from Wisconsin who relocate to Malibu for the summer for Stan's work. Seeing an opportunity to experience the high society of Malibu, they rent a $7,000 per month beach house from realtor Billie Farnsworth (Kim Novak), who introduces the couple to the rich elite in the neighborhood. Among them are their neighbor movie star Clint Redman (Troy Donahue), famous tennis player Art Bonnell (Chad Everett), book writer Hunnicutt Powell (Richard McKenzie), and talk show host Gail Hessian (Ann Jillian).

Gail is determined to invite Tom Wharton (James Coburn) on her talk show, the town's wealthiest and most powerful lawyer notorious for his dirty dealings, in order to expose him as a crook. Initially, she tries to get to him through his wife Mary (Eva Marie Saint), but Mary politely rejects her offer. Gail then directly approaches Tom at the local tennis club. Even though he makes clear that he will not do an interview, he takes an interest in her and takes her out. Before long, their meetings become romantic. Mary becomes aware of this and warns Tom to keep the affair discreet. Due to Tom's interview rejection, Gail settles for an interview with the already overexposed Hunnicutt. On air, she tries to get a scoop by questioning his sexuality, which causes a furious Hunnicutt to abruptly end the interview.

Initially, Stan and Linda settle in smoothly and enjoy the perks of a rich society. Before long, however, trouble begins when treacherous people enter their lives. Television star Rich Bradley (Steve Forrest) becomes infatuated with Linda, but she flees when he harasses her. Stan, meanwhile, meets the seductive Dee Staufer (Valerie Perrine), who shows an obvious interest in him, much to Linda's jealousy and anger. Stan tries to assure Linda that she has nothing to worry about.

Meanwhile, an aging yet aspiring screenwriter Charlie Wigham (Richard Mulligan) tries to sell his screenplay centered around a middle-aged man to the powerful film director Wilson Mahoney (Anthony Newley), but despite many attempts is not able to impress him. At a lavish house party thrown by Dee, Wilson warns Charlie to stay away from him. At the same party, Stan spots Rich, and becomes infuriated at him for harassing his wife. Much to everyone's surprise, Tom knocks him to the ground.

=== Part 2 ===
The high society life slowly drives Stan and Linda apart. Linda grows closer to Art, who gives her private tennis lessons. Stan, meanwhile, grows more and more greedy, especially when offered a business deal by Jay Pomerantz (George Hamilton). He tells Linda he intends on settling down in Malibu, but she believes their new life will come at the cost of their marriage and begs him to return to Wisconsin with her. When Stan refuses, she agrees to an affair with Art. Unbeknownst to Stan, Jay is a con artist who has conned Stan out of a large sum of money. Billie sees through his scams, but Jay pays her silence with a large money offer, assuring her that he will win big by betting on a tennis match between Art and Tom. When Linda leaves on a so-called holiday in San Francisco, Stan seizes the opportunity to develop an affair with Dee, who tips him off about Jay's wrongdoings.

Despite their affair, Gail stays determined to reveal Tom's practices on her talk show, and invites an old co-worker to anonymously expose him. The interview backfires, however, which Gail believes Tom is responsible for. Mary, desperate for Gail to stop her affair with Tom, offers her a dirty scoop on condition that she leaves them alone afterwards. Shortly after, she overdoses on pills but survives. Tom, now aware of her betrayal, tells Mary that she is a fraud and encourages her to leave Malibu for good.

Meanwhile, Art falls more and more in love with Linda and proposes to her. He tells her that he is finalizing a business deal with Tom that will earn him enough money to divorce his wife Laura (Bridget Hanley) and start a new life with her. Tom, however, warns Art that the deal will only go through if he lets him win at a tennis match. When Art wins the match, the deal falls through, and Linda realizes that he will not leave his wife for her. Linda admits the affair to Laura, and Laura reveals to her that Art has done this many times before. Billie visits Jay's house to collect the money he won, but finds out that he has secretly left town and that she is the latest of his con victims.

Charlie's girlfriend Cindy (Jenilee Harrison) pulls off an investment offer for Charlie's screenplay, provided that the main character is a young guy and that Wilson will direct. Cindy shortly after meets Wilson in the supermarket and convinces him to give Charlie a chance. Charlie gets his big break, but Cindy leaves him during the process to be with Wilson. In the end, Linda, feeling disappointed by all people in Malibu, decides to leave town, and she convinces Stan to join her, thereby reconciling their marriage. Tom, meanwhile, is exposed as a crook in Gail's talk show.

== Cast ==
William Atherton as Stan Harvey
Stan is a business man from Wisconsin who arrives in Malibu for work to test a new product. He soon becomes involved with the high society of town and grows more greedy.

James Coburn as Thomas 'Tom' Wharton
Tom is the wealthiest and most powerful attorney in town who deals dirty. He regularly cheats on his wife.

Susan Dey as Linda Harvey
Linda is a once small town stage actress, and now Stan's wife. Coming from a modest background, she is skeptical of life in Malibu's high society.

Chad Everett as Art Bonnell
Art is a tennis coach for the wealthy residents in Malibu and once a professional tennis player himself.

Steve Forrest as Rich Bradley
Rich is a married television actor who often uses his fame to pick up women. One of his many mistresses include Dee, and now he is going after Linda.

George Hamilton as Jay Pomerantz
Jay is a con artist who has schemed his way into Malibu's high society, and is involved in many dirty deals.

Jenilee Harrison as Cindy
Cindy is Charlie's gold digging and ditsy girlfriend who has a penchant for going barefoot.

Ann Jillian as Gail Hessian
Gail is an ambitious and opportunistic talk show host determined to get her big break by exposing Tom as a crook on her show.

Richard Mulligan as Charlie Wigham
Charlie is an aging man with a big fortune now aspiring to become a screenwriter and struggling to get his big break.

Anthony Newley as Wilson Mahoney
Wilson is a successful movie director constantly bothered by Charlie.

Kim Novak as Billie Farnsworth
Billie is a well-connected realtor in Malibu who knows everyone's business.

Valerie Perrine as Dee Staufer
Dee is a seductive woman who became rich following a stock market tip from a guy she met at a party. Now, she enjoys her wealth and seduces the rich men in town.

Eva Marie Saint as Mary Wharton
Mary is Tom's wife working as an ecological activist, aware of her husband's infidelity.

Bridget Hanley as Laura Bonnell
Laura is Art's wife who has known of his infidelity for many years.

Troy Donahue - Clint Redman
Clint Redman is a famous movie star and next-door neighbor of Stan and Linda.

Richard McKenzie as Hunnicutt Powell
Hunnicutt is an eccentric and arrogant author and a lifelong bachelor, rumored to be gay.

Rod McCary as Alex West
Alex is a producer for Gail's talk show.

Selma Archerd as Amanda Settles
Floyd Levine as Mr. X
Hansford Rowe as Dr. Ferraro
Reid Smith as Tad
Douglas Dirkson as Bascomb
Diane Sommerfield as Leoni
Steve Levitt as Goopy
Peter Van Norden as Bumbo
Carol Hamner as Mrs. Benedict
Monique St. Pierre as Jane Dennison
Tawny Kitaen as Mahoney's Girlfriend
