= Val Bisoglio =

American character actor (1926–2021)

- Bisoglio in Quincy, M.E., 1977
- Born: Italo Valentino Bisoglio; May 7, 1926; New York City, U.S.
- Died: October 18, 2021 (aged 95); Los Olivos, California, U.S.
- Occupation: Actor
- Years active: 1956–2002
- Spouse: Bonnie Bisoglio
- Children: 3

Italo Valentino Bisoglio (May 7, 1926 – October 18, 2021) was an American character actor primarily known for his work on television.

== Biography ==
Bisoglio was born in New York City, New York, on May 7, 1926.

Bisoglio may be best known for his recurring role as restaurateur "Danny Tovo" in the popular medical drama television series Quincy, M.E. from 1976 to 1983. During his television acting career, Bisoglio appeared in numerous television programs during the 1960s and 1970s including The Doctors, McCloud, M*A*S*H (three episodes), All in the Family, Barney Miller, The Mary Tyler Moore Show, Roll Out, Kojak, Baretta, McMillan & Wife, and The Rockford Files. In 1986, Bisoglio appeared on Miami Vice (season 3, episode 11) in an episode titled "Forgive Us our Debts".

In 2002, he appeared in his final television role as Murf Lupo in The Sopranos, appearing in three episodes.

From his work in film, Bisoglio is perhaps best known for his role as "Frank Manero Sr.", the volatile father of "Tony Manero" (John Travolta) in the 1977 film Saturday Night Fever.

His other film credits include an uncredited role in Serpico (1973), as well as roles in No Way to Treat a Lady (1968), The Brotherhood (1968), The Don Is Dead (1973), Linda Lovelace for President (1975), The Hindenburg (1975), St. Ives (1976), and The Frisco Kid (1979).

Bisoglio died of Lewy body dementia at the age of 95 at his home in Los Olivos, California, on October 18, 2021.

== Filmography ==
Year	Title	Role	Notes
1966	Hot Rod Hullabaloo		
1968	No Way to Treat a Lady	Detective Monaghan	
1968	The Brotherhood	Cheech	
1973	The Don Is Dead	Pete Lazatti	
1973	Serpico	Weapons Storage Officer	Uncredited
1975	Linda Lovelace for President	Rev. Billy Easter	
1975	The Hindenburg	Lieutenant Lombardi	
1976	St. Ives	Finley Cummins	
1977	Saturday Night Fever	Frank Manero Sr.	
1979	The Frisco Kid	Chief Gray Cloud	
1999	Diamonds	Tarzan LeCompte	
