= Christopher Dark =

American actor (1920–1971)

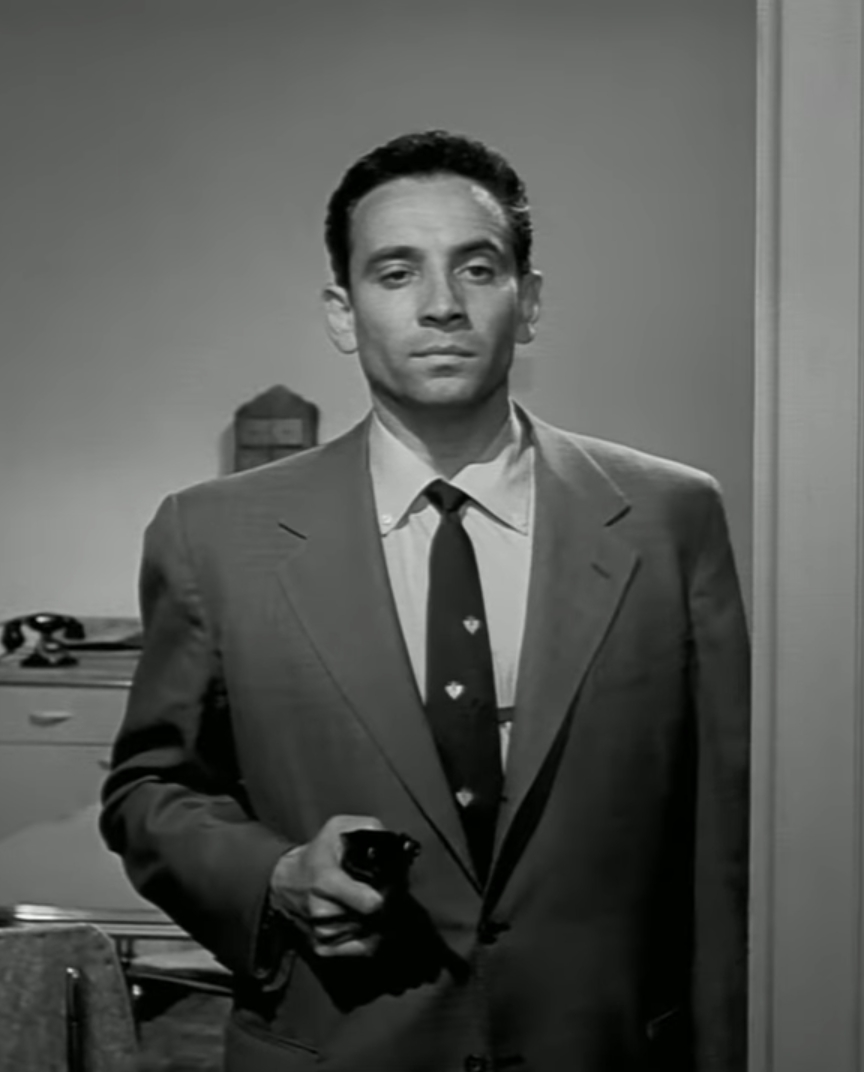
- Dark in Suddenly (1954)
- Born: Alfred Francis DeLeo; April 21, 1920; The Bronx, New York, U.S.
- Died: October 10, 1971 (aged 51); Los Angeles, California, U.S.
- Resting place: Holy Cross Cemetery, Culver City, California, U.S.
- Occupations: Actor; writer
- Years active: 1946–1971
- Spouse: Eleanor Dark (m. 1948)
- Children: 1

Christopher Dark (born Alfred Francis DeLeo; April 21, 1920 – October 10, 1971) was an American actor. He graduated from Cornell University and did post graduate work at Columbia University. He served as an army medic in the Philippines during WWII, and received honors. He began his career in theater in NY, and then moved to Hollywood in 1952. He was a member of the Foreign Film Committee for SAG for most of his career. In addition to acting, he also wrote many scripts, including collaborations with Ida Lupino and Christopher Cary.

== Biography ==
Dark was born in New York.

In 1954, Dark played in an episode of the TV series, The Lone Ranger, entitled "Texas Draw". In 1955, Dark was cast in an episode of the NBC Western anthology series, Frontier, hosted by Walter Coy. Dark guest starred on two episodes of the ABC religion anthology series, Crossroads, as Irving Green in "The Unholy Trio (1955) and as Frank Corletto in "Circus Priest" (1956).

In 1956, Dark appeared in two episodes of Science Fiction Theatre, S2E6 "Bullet Proof," and S2E9 "End of Tomorrow."

In 1957 and 1958, Dark guest starred in two episodes of David Janssen's crime drama, Richard Diamond, Private Detective, as the lead in "The Mickey Farmer Case" and then as Rudi Trekhala in "Widow's Walk". About this time, he also guest starred on John Bromfield's crime drama, U.S. Marshal. In 1957, he played Sgt. Al Zavala in four episodes of the syndicated crime drama, Code 3, with Richard Travis in the lead role of assistant Sheriff Rodger Barnett. He also guest-starred a number of times on the CBS situation comedy Mr. Adams and Eve during its two-season run in 1957–1958.

In 1958, Dark appeared as Don Ramon in the episode "Decoy" on the ABC/Warner Brothers Western series, Colt .45, starring Wayde Preston. That same year, Dark played the main villain, William Swanson, in the episode "The Young Gun" in Robert Culp's Western series, Trackdown.

In 1959, Dark guest starred in the first episode of NBC's Bonanza in "A Rose for Lotta". Besides the pilot, he would also guest star in other three episodes of the Western series: "The Fear Merchants" (1960), "Calamity Over the Comstock" (1963) and "Showdown at Tahoe" (1967). He played Ben in a 1959 episode of The Rifleman (S2 E2) "Bloodlines".

Dark appeared in 1959 as Juan Carlos Morita in the episode "Death of a Gunfighter" on CBS' Have Gun - Will Travel and as Trevor Jackson in the episode "Reunion" of CBS's The Texan, starring Rory Calhoun; his fellow co-stars were Bethel Leslie and Robert F. Simon. That same year, he was cast as Henri Gaspard in "Double Fee" of Steve McQueen's CBS Western series, Wanted: Dead or Alive.

In 1960, Dark was cast with Richard Rust in the episode "An Hour to Kill" of the half-hour syndicated crime drama, The Brothers Brannagan, and he played a teacher falsely accused of murder in the Peter Gunn episode "Death Watch". Another 1960 role was that of Dante in "Talent for Danger" on the ABC adventure series, The Islanders, set in the South Pacific.

In 1960, he was cast as Miguel Avarado in the episode "Bandido" of the syndicated Western series, Pony Express, starring Grant Sullivan. His fellow guest stars in the segment were Douglas Kennedy and Robert Ivers.

In 1962 Dark appeared as Walt Gleason on The Virginian in the episode titled "The Accomplice." and in 1963 as Benny Caboose in the episode entitled "Brother Thaddeus".

Dark played the role of Pike in the three-part 1964 episode, "The Tenderfoot", of NBC's Disney's The Wonderful World of Color.

Dark also appeared in 1965 on the fourth season of Combat! as a German agent in the episode "9 Place Vendee".

In 1965 he appeared as Quadero in season 8, episode 5, "Escort to Doom" of the television show Rawhide.

In 1970 Dark appeared as Mort in the TV Western "The Men From Shiloh" (the rebranded name of The Virginian) in the episode titled "Jenny."

== Personal life ==
Dark died from a heart attack on October 10, 1971 and was interred in Holy Cross Cemetery, Culver City, California.

== Filmography ==
Year	Title	Role	Notes
1950	September Affair	Passport Clerk	Uncredited
1953	Raiders of the Seven Seas	Pablo	
1953	Loretta Young Show	Joe Stone	Season 1 Episode 37: "Trained for Murder"
1953	The Steel Lady	Ibrahim	
1954	Suddenly	Bart Wheeler	
1956	Diane	Giancarlo	
1956	World Without End	Henry 'Hank' Jaffe	
1956	Johnny Concho	Walker	
1957	The Halliday Brand	Jivaro Burris	
1957	Mr. Adams and Eve	Sherwood	Season 1 Episode 10: "The Torn-Shirt School of Acting"
1957	Mr. Adams and Eve	Rajah Ahmed Khan	Season 2 Episode 3: "International Affair"
1957	Baby Face Nelson	Jerry	Uncredited
1958	Day of the Badman	Rudy Hayes	
1958	Mr. Adams and Eve	Max Cassolini	Season 2 Episode 20: "The Big Top"
1958	Wild Heritage	Brazos, Trail Drive Cowhand	
1959	The Rabbit Trap	Gerry	
1960	Gundown at Sandoval		(archive footage)
1960	Platinum High School	Vince Perley	
1961	Gold of the Seven Saints	Frank	Uncredited
1962	How the West Was Won	Poker Player with Cleve	Uncredited
1962	Alfred Hitchcock Presents	Ainsley Crowder	Season 7 Episode 35: "The Children of Alda Nuova"
1962	The Virginian	Walt Gleason	Season 1 Episode 13: "The Accomplice"
1962	The Virginian	Benny Caboose	Season 2 Episode 7: "Brother Thaddeus"
1963	Son of Flubber	Police Captain / TV Broadcaster	Voice, Uncredited
1963	The Alfred Hitchcock Hour	Manuel Sanchez	Season 1 Episode 17: "Forecast: Low Clouds and Coastal Fog"
1965	None But the Brave	Private Searcy	
1967	Family Affair	Orson	Season 1 Episode 30: "The Butler Method"
1968	The Private Navy of Sgt. O'Farrell	Private George Strongbow	
1970	The Virginian	Mort	Season 9 Episode 3: "Jenny"
1971	Scandalous John	Card Dealer	
