= Hilly Hicks =

American character actor (born 1950)

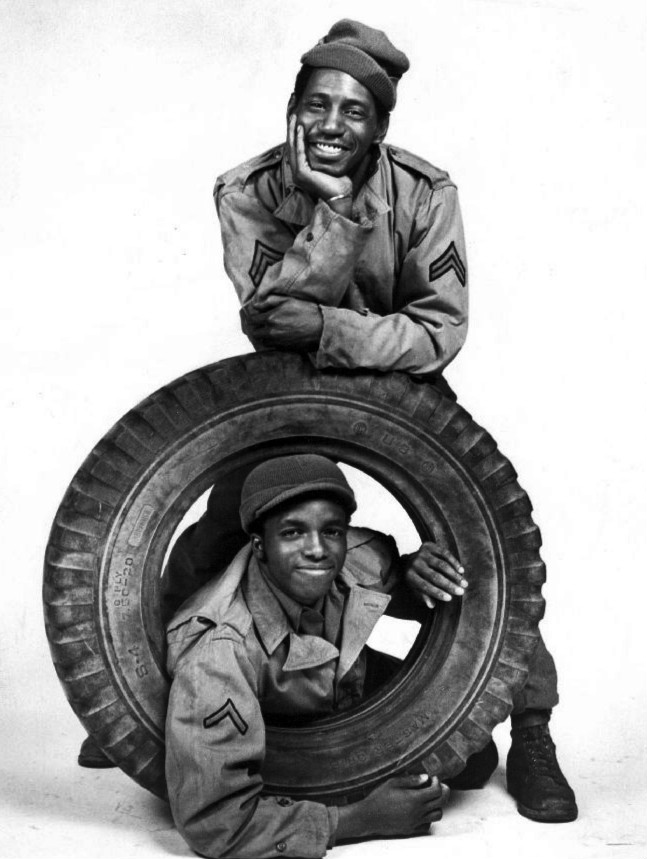
- Hicks (in tire) and Stu Gilliam in Roll Out, 1973.
- Born: Hilly Gene Hicks; May 4, 1950 (age 75)
- Occupation: Actor
- Years active: 1969–1985
- Children: Hilly Hicks Jr.

Hilly Gene Hicks Sr. (born May 4, 1950) is an American character actor turned clergyman.

== Biography ==
The role for which Hicks is perhaps best known is Lewis Harvey (the younger son of Alex Haley's second great-grandfather Chicken George) in the TV mini-series Roots. He appeared in the programs Adam-12, The Rookies, The Bill Cosby Show, Night Gallery, Hill Street Blues, M*A*S*H (appearing twice; once as a soldier trying to steal penicillin and again as an Army medic), Roll Out! (a short-lived sitcom created by M*A*S*H producers Larry Gelbart & Gene Reynolds), the TV movie Friendly Fire, the theatrical movies Gray Lady Down and Raise the Titanic. Hicks appeared in the Barnaby Jones episode titled "Dangerous Summer" (02/11/1975). He starred as Robbie Robertson in the 1977 television movie pilot for the CBS series The Amazing Spider-Man, and did voicework in Hanna Barbera's 1970s Godzilla TV cartoon. He also played Brent in the period film and mini-series Louisiana.
