= Hamburger: The Motion Picture =

1986 film by Mike Marvin

- Theatrical release poster
- Directed by: Mike Marvin
- Written by: Donald Ross
- Produced by: Edward S. Feldman; Charles R. Meeker
- Starring: Leigh McCloskey; Dick Butkus; Sandy Hackett; Randi Brooks; Jack Blessing; Charles Tyner; Chuck McCann
- Cinematography: Karen Grossman
- Edited by: Steven Schoenberg; Ann E. Mills
- Music by: Peter Bernstein
- Production company: Feldman/Meeker Production
- Distributed by: FM Entertainment
- Release date: January 27, 1986
- Running time: 90 minutes
- Country: United States
- Language: English

Hamburger: The Motion Picture is a 1986 American teen sex comedy film directed by Mike Marvin and starring Leigh McCloskey. The film centers around the character of Russell Proco (McCloskey), who finds himself way too distracted by women who want to have sex with him. Proco decides to enroll in Busterburger University to become an owner of a Busterburger fast food franchise.

Hamburger: The Motion Picture began production in 1985 where it was predominantly shot in California and premiered in Los Angeles in January. The film received negative reviews from The Los Angeles Times, The New York Times, and The Miami Herald.

== Plot ==
Russell Proco has been expelled from multiple schools because of his crude behavior, predominantly having women throw themselves at him (even when he is in no mood). He was given a large trust fund, but his grandfather's will stipulated that it is frozen unless he receives a college diploma. While trying to mull over his problem at a local Busterburger owned by a friend of his, who said he had a similar problem and that he received the equivalent of a college diploma after finishing Busterburger University. Russell agrees that this may be his way to get the trust fund unfrozen.

After signing up, Russell runs afoul of Drootin, a vicious teacher whose job is to ensure that improper franchise owners will flunk out. Drootin imposes three rules on all the candidates: All candidates are to remain on the grounds of Busterburger University until graduation. Outside consumption of alcohol, tobacco, drugs and food is prohibited. Since sex and success make lousy partners, all candidates are not to engage in sex while students. Russell tries to focus on work and to steer clear of his zany classmates, among them a fellow horndog who lusts after the CEO's trophy wife, a nun, an obese man who shocks himself to avoid overeating, a sex-crazed female guerrilla from Central America, as well as a black pop musician named Magneto Jones (Chip McAllister) who is kidnapped by police and brought to Busterburger University in handcuffs, in order to improve minority imaging. Russell finds himself attracted to another teacher, Mia Vunk who is the CEO's daughter and is dating Drootin. When Drootin learns of a rival suitor, he makes it a priority to drum out Russell. After being caught off campus, Drootin punishes Russell by having special sauce dumped on him while being made to listen to the company's theme song several times.

Russell manages to pass the first part of the final test, an oral exam conducted by Lyman Vunk and the teachers, and must now pass the second part, whereupon all the candidates will be made to manage Busterburger for one day. Drootin makes sure Russell and everyone fails by first getting an eating club of obese people to the Busterburger, who will probably exhaust all the food reserves. Russell uses explosive means to dispose of them, then Drootin hijacks the drive-thru intercom to insult a black motorcycle policeman's race and profession, who drives off enraged as he was simply trying to grab lunch at Busterburger. A biker girl makes a pass at Russell, who refuses this but is mistaken by her boyfriend, who gets his gang to smash up the restaurant. A bunch of black cops arrive, not to arrest the bikers but also to take part caused by Drootin's earlier instigation. To underscore, Drootin attempts a cornfield meet with a poultry truck, who swerves into the ruined Busterburger to avoid a car crash. The students are disheartened that they will flunk out, but Russell gives a pep talk that there is no way they cannot handle being franchise owners after these mishaps, himself now having come to accept the responsibility. Lyman Vunk appears, but is oblivious to the carnage, instead noticing one of the burnt chickens is ideal for his proposed new line of chicken sandwiches. Drootin gets demoted to picking up litter when he smears food on Vunk's white suit by accident, and Russell begins a relationship with Mia. The film ends with Russell and his fellow students graduating from Busterburger University, where the funk singer ends the closing ceremony with his version of the company's theme song.

== Cast ==
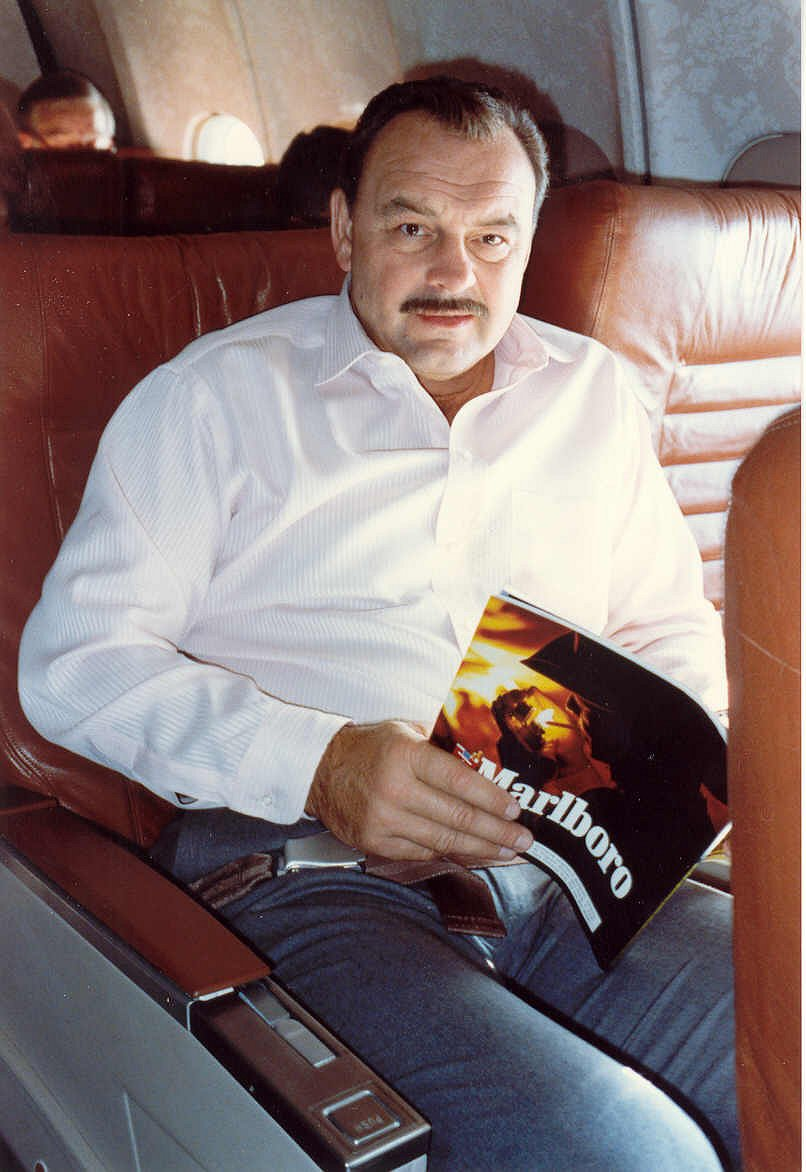
Dick Butkus c. 1995

- Leigh McCloskey as Russell Proco
- Dick Butkus as Drootin
- Randi Brooks as Mrs. Vunk
- Jack Blessing as Nacio Herb Ziper
- Chuck McCann as Dr. Mole
- Sandy Hackett as Fred Domino
- Charles Tyner as Lyman Vunk
- Debra Blee as Mia Vunk
- John William Young as Perstopopnick
- Barbra Whinnery as Sister Sara
- Maria Richwine as Conchita
- Chip McAllister as Magneto Jones
- Sarah Abrell as Counter Girl
- Peggy Rea as Mrs. Cratchmatter
- Robert Lee Minor as Officer Rigney
- Bob Drew as Bus Driver
- Rob Paulsen, Steve Conte, Jim Jackman, Peter Georgilas and Jon Lovitz as Security Guards

== Production ==
Hamburger: The Motion Picture began production on May 29, 1985. The film was shot at College of the Canyons in Valencia, California which portrayed Busterburger University in the film. The film later moved to Canoga Park to shoot scenes at the Campos Burritos restaurant and had to rebuild the restaurant after it is demolished in the film.

== Release ==
Hamburger: The Motion Picture had its Los Angeles premiere on January 27, 1986, and opened later in New York on March 21, 1986.

== Critical response ==
On Metacritic, the film has a weighted average score of 15 out of 100, based on 4 critics, indicating "Overwhelming dislike". Michael Wilmington of The Los Angeles Times compared the film to the "dregs" of Animal House and Police Academy declaring it "another passel of daffy, goofy, sex-crazed guys; bosomy, moaning sex-starved girls; screaming nerds; yowling dimwits and howling bullies" concluding that the film should be titled "Motion Picture: The Hamburger". Bill Cosford of The Miami Herald made similar comparisons, stating that "like Police Academy and a dozen others before it, is essentially a basic-training sitcom with some softcore on the side." and proclaimed that the film had been "botched by a script aimed at just that segment of the audience that is theoretically banned from attending R-rated films." Walter Goodman of The New York Times found that the film was " mainly gags about food, such as getting it all over you, and sex, such as finding it under a table in a Chinese restaurant. There are also jokes about blacks, Latin Americans, religion in general and nuns in particular, overweight people and the alimentary canal. The result is plenty of irreverence but not much fun."
