= Mr. Adams and Eve =

1957 TV series

- Genre: Sitcom
- Created by: Collier Young (characters)
- Starring: Howard Duff; Ida Lupino
- Composer: David Rose
- Country of origin: United States
- Original language: English
- No. of seasons: 2
- No. of episodes: 66

Production
- Executive producer: Collier Young
- Producer: Warner Toub, Jr.
- Running time: 30 minutes
- Production company: Four Star-Bridget

Original release
- Network: CBS
- Release: January 4, 1957 – July 8, 1958

Howard Duff as Howard Adams and Ida Lupino as Eve Adams (Eve Drake) in a publicity photo for Mr. Adams and Eve.

Mr. Adams and Eve is an American sitcom television series about a married couple who are both movie stars. It stars Howard Duff and Ida Lupino (who were actually married at the time) and aired on CBS from January 4, 1957, to July 8, 1958. (with reruns continuing until September 23, 1968)

== Plot ==
Eve and Howard Adams are a married couple who are both movie stars and reside in Beverly Hills, California. Eve, who uses her maiden name, Eve Drake, professionally, grew up in a show-business family and tends to be dramatic in both her professional and home lives. Howard is a down-to-earth native of Seattle, Washington, who handles Eve's excesses with patience and indulgence.

The Adamses are under contract to Consolidated Pictures, where the blustery-but-pragmatic Joe "J. B." Hafter is the studio boss. He often pushes the Adamses to make films with exciting, romantic titles which will attract audiences. The Adamses often work with director Max Cassolini. Steve is the Adamses' longtime agent and friend and Elsie the down-to-earth and plain-spoken housekeeper who has worked for them for 12 years and runs the household. Connie Drake is Eve's mother, and Frances and Burt Stewart are friends of Howard and Eve.

Episodes covered many aspects of the Adamses' lives, including disputes with Hafter, negotiations with Steve, problems with movie scripts, and events at the film studio and in their domestic life together.

The Duffs' 6-year old real-life daughter, Bridget Duff, also acted in one episode of the series in 1958. She played Mary Pickford in the episode "The Ghosts of Consolidated", which aired on May 6, 1958.

== Cast ==
- Ida Lupino as Eve Adams/Eve Drake
- Howard Duff as Howard Adams
- Hayden Rorke as Steve
- Olive Carey as Elsie
- Alan Reed as Joe "J. B." Hafter
- Lee Patrick as Connie Drake
- Frances Robinson as Louise Stewart (season 1)
- Dan Tobin as Burt Stewart (season 1)
- Lawrence Dobkin/Christopher Dark as Max Cassolini

== Production ==
Ida Lupino and Howard Duff were a married couple in real life at the time. The plots of many episodes of Mr. Adams and Eve were based on actual events Lupino and Duff had experienced during their acting careers, albeit exaggerated for comic effect. The set used on the show duplicated Lupino's and Duff's real-life Malibu Beach house, including furniture and floor plan. Lupino insisted on that reproduction so that their activities on the show would seem true to life.

Mr. Adams and Eve was a Four Star-Bridget production. Collier Young, who created the show's characters and was its executive producer, was Lupino's ex-husband. Warren Toub, Jr., was the producer. David Rose composed the show's music.

Tiring of the battle for ratings, Lupino and Duff announced in June 1958 that Mr. Adams and Eve would not return for a third season and that instead they would pursue separate television projects for the 1958–1959 season.

== Broadcast history ==
Airing on Fridays at 9:00 p.m. Eastern Time, Mr. Adams and Eve premiered on January 4, 1957. Twenty-five episodes were produced for its first season, the last of them airing on June 25, 1957. After reruns aired during the summer of 1957, the second and final season premiered on September 20, 1957, and consisted of 41 episodes. On February 11, 1958, during the second season, the show moved to 8:00 p.m. Eastern Time on Tuesdays, where it remained for the rest of its run. The last new episode was broadcast on July 8, 1958. Prime-time reruns of Mr. Adams and Eve then aired in its regular Tuesday time slot until September 23, 1958.

== Accolades ==
Ida Lupino was twice nominated for Primetime Emmy Awards for her performance in Mr. Adams and Eve, receiving a nomination in 1958 for "Best Continuing Performance by an Actress in a Leading Role in a Dramatic or Comedy Series" for her work in Season 1 and in 1959 for "Best Actress in a Leading Role (Continuing Character) in a Comedy Series" for her work in Season 2. Richard Kinon received the nomination for "Best Direction of a Single Program of a Comedy Series".

== Episodes ==
Season	Episodes	Originally released	
Season	Episodes	First released	Last released
1	25	January 4, 1957	June 21, 1957
2	41	September 20, 1957	July 8, 1958

=== Season 1 (1957) ===
No. overall	No. in season	Title	Directed by	Written by	Original release date
1	1	"The Young Actress"	Don Weis	Sol Saks	January 4, 1957
Howard hires an ambitious young actress who soon shows that she is adept at upstaging others and stealing scenes. Cast opposite her, Eve and Howard decide to teach her a lesson. Guest star: Gloria Talbott.
2	2	"Typical"	Don Weis	Sol Saks	January 11, 1957
Steve comes up with an idea for a television series for Howard and Eve, a domestic situation comedy in which they would portray a typical suburban couple. Eve balks at the idea because she views television acting as beneath her, and Steve decides that the series would not work because Eve and Howard could not convincingly play a typical couple. Eve decides to prove him wrong by demonstrating that she and Howard can be typical for one day, making coffee, doing the laundry, and clipping the hedges. They fail completely, chaos ensues, and Eve's inadequacy as a housewife leaves her on the verge of a nervous breakdown.
3	3	"They're Off and Running"	Don Weis	Sol Saks	January 18, 1957
Howard and Eve buy a race horse. It looks great — until it runs. Guest stars: Will Wright and Ralph Moody.
4	4	"The Teen-Age Daughter"	Unknown	Unknown	January 25, 1957
When Howard and Eve are cast as the parents of a teenage daughter in their next movie, they are disturbed by the idea that anyone would think they are old enough to portray the parents of a teenager. Guest star: William Schallert
5	5	"This Is Your Life"	Unknown	Unknown	February 1, 1957
When Howard suddenly becomes secretive about his activities and people start acting strangely around her, Eve gets the mistaken impression that Howard is seeing another woman. Guest star: Mala Powers.
6	6	TBA	Unknown	Unknown	February 8, 1957
Howard and Eve visit their home town after a long absence and find that a great deal has changed — and that the pace of life there is too hectic. Guest stars: Jeff Donnell and Tom Brown.
7	7	"The Proposal"	Unknown	Unknown	February 15, 1957
When Howard and Eve grant the exclusive rights to the story of their courtship, engagement, and marriage to a movie fan magazine and sit for an interview, they remember events in the same way until the magazine asks them who proposed to whom — and they disagree. Guest stars: Don Orlando and Fay Baker.
8	8	"Howard Goes to Jail"	Unknown	Unknown	February 22, 1957
After Howard is voted "Most Uncooperative Star" by the press, he decides to host a cocktail party for newspapermen. Eve arrives on time for the event, but not Howard — he is in jail after getting involved in a fistfight, and Eve must fill in for him at the party. Guest stars: Ellen Corby and Peter Leeds.
9	9	"The Business Manager"	Unknown	Unknown	March 1, 1957
Howard and Eve hire Francis X. Bushman, a matinee idol of the silent film era, for a bit part in a movie. Believing him to be penniless, they decide that they must adhere to a strict budget if they are to save enough money for their retirement and old age. Guest stars: Francis X. Bushman (as himself) and Whit Bissell.
10	10	"The Torn-Shirt School of Acting"	Unknown	Unknown	March 8, 1957
Howard and Eve agree to appear in a play put on by an amateur summer-stock experimental theater group, then regret it when they discover that the play is to be performed in blank verse. Guest star: Jack Lambert.
11	11	"The Mothers"	Richard Kinon	Sol Saks, Bernard Ederer, & Robert White	March 15, 1957
Howard's and Eve's mothers have little in common, and when both women visit the Adamses at the same time, Howard and Eve find it difficult to keep them entertained. Guest stars: Olive Blakeney and Walter Woolf King.
12	12	"Academy Award"	Roy Kellino	Charles Lederer & Collier Young	March 22, 1957
Howard and Eve both receive Academy Award nominations, but only Eve wins. Howard's ego is bruised, and their relationship becomes rough. Guest stars: Sheilah Graham (as herself), King Donovan, and Joe Kearns.
13	13	"Taken for Granted"	Richard Kinon	Sol Saks & Louella MacFarlane	March 29, 1957
When Howard decides to watch boxing instead of accompany Eve to a fancy party, she makes arrangements to attend it with Steve instead, but she and Steve never arrive at the party. Eve lies to Howard, telling him that she and Steve have been having clandestine meetings, and Howard reacts jealously — exactly as Eve hoped he would. Guest star: Ted Stanhope.
14	14	"Fulfilling Talents"	Unknown	Unknown	April 5, 1957
Eve does not view Howard as having any literary talent and is surprised when he decides to take up poetry at the urging of an old girlfriend of his.
15	15	"That Magazine"	Unknown	Unknown	April 12, 1957
Howard and Eve are pleased about the publicity when a magazine assigns a photographer and a reporter to cover a typical day in their life together. To make sure that they get best coverage possible, they carefully rehearse their own version of a day in their lives — but on the day the magazine visits, unexpected events cause everything to go so wrong that it leads them to threaten each other with divorce. Guest stars: Barbara Billingsley and Alvin Greenman.
16	16	"The Social Crowd"	Unknown	Unknown	April 19, 1957
Cast as aristocrats in their next movie, Howard and Eve spend a weekend at the home of a socialite to prepare them for their roles. Guest star: Norma Varden.
17	17	"Foreign Actress"	Unknown	Unknown	April 26, 1957
After a glamorous European actress upstages Howard and Eve in a movie they are making, they decide to get even with her in an upcoming scene. Guest star: Patricia Donahue.
18	18	"Insomnia"	Unknown	Unknown	May 3, 1957
While Howard is suffering from insomnia, he agrees to give a speech at a banquet for a studio executive. He finally falls asleep — in the middle of the speech, with Eve frantically trying to wake him.
19	19	"The Diet"	Unknown	Unknown	May 10, 1957
Eve receives a bathroom scale as a gift, and when she steps on it she discovers that she is 4 pounds (1.8 kg) overweight. She goes overboard to lose the weight quickly, putting herself on a strict diet. Guest stars: Nick Dennis and Barbara Pepper.
20	20	"The Picture That Could Not Be Made"	Abner Biberman	Norman Katkov	May 17, 1957
Confident in the moviemaking knowledge they have acquired during their acting careers, Howard and Eve take on an ambitious new project: producing their own movie. They encounter problem after problem, and soon realize that they do not know as much as they thought.
21	21	"The Fighter"	Unknown	Unknown	May 24, 1957
Howard wins the rights to a prizefighter's career in a game of gin rummy and decides to groom him for success in the boxing ring. Eve, however, decides that the boxer is also hers based on community property law, and she has her own ideas about how to train him. Guest stars: Morris Miller, Douglass Dumbrille, and Jack Lomas.
22	22	"The Rumor"	Unknown	Unknown	May 31, 1957
When Howard and Eve become separated at a crowded nightclub, a press agent corners Eve, introduces her to her handsome young client, and arranges to have a photographer cover Eve's meeting with the young man. The next morning, newspaper gossip columns carry the "news" that Eve's and Howard's marriage is ending. Guest star: William Swan.
23	23	"The Lost Two Hours"	Unknown	Unknown	June 7, 1957
Howard and Eve accept an invitation from Louise and Burt, believing it is to a dinner party. They skip lunch, get lost, arrive late and very hungry, and are shocked to discover that it is a cocktail party, leaving them to find food where they can.
24	24	"The Bachelor"	Richard Kinon	Sol Saks & Louella MacFarlane	June 14, 1957
Eve's handsome old boyfriend Kurt gets the part of "the other man" in a movie starring Eve and Howard. Howard feels no jealousy and he and Kurt even go out on the town together for a few nights — but Howard finds that he prefers his married life with Eve to Kurt's bachelor lifestyle. Guest stars: Craig Stevens, Damian O'Flynn, and Paul Grant.
25	25	"Separate Vacations"	Unknown	Unknown	June 21, 1957
Howard and Eve decide to spend their vacation at home, but find that they have nothing to talk about, and they become bored. Burt invites Howard to go deep-sea fishing with him, and Louise invites Eve to stay with her while their husbands are fishing — and the Adamses learn that separate vacations create problems, too.

=== Season 2 (1957–58) ===
No. overall	No. in season	Title	Directed by	Written by	Original release date
26	1	"Adult Western"	Richard Kinon	Sol Saks	September 20, 1957
Howard and Eve must fight the heat and dust when they go on location in Arizona to star in an adult western — and Eve must make up with another actor after a falling out with him. Guest stars: Maxine Cooper and Robert Ryan.
27	2	"Taming of the Shrew"	Unknown	Unknown	September 27, 1957
As Howard and Eve prepare for their roles in a monumental film version of The Taming of the Shrew, they encounter various difficulties when Connie decides to embark on a number of business ventures — including the raising of minks — and the Adamses' friend David Niven, who is visiting to promote his new film version of Around the World in Eighty Days, interrupts auditions for The Taming of the Shrew by floating down in a balloon in character as Phineas Fogg. Guest star: David Niven (as himself).
28	3	"International Affair"	Unknown	Unknown	October 4, 1957
Rajah Ahmed Khan visits the studio where Eve and Howard are making a movie and immediately decides that he wants Eve for his harem. He offers to buy her from Howard, and Eve and United States Government officials try to avoid an international incident. Guest stars: Christopher Dark, Eve Miller, and William Schallert.
29	4	"Split Careers"	Unknown	Unknown	October 11, 1957
Howard and Eve decide that they should split up their acting team and appear in different movies so that each can receive single-star billing — but Hafter objects to giving them separate movie projects because they are so lucrative for the studio as a team.
30	5	"Joan Fontaine"	Unknown	Unknown	October 18, 1957
During an interview with a press feature writer, Connie says that her favorite actress is Joan Fontaine. Eve hears her and, believing that she will never become an important dramatic actress if her own mother does not believe in her, abruptly and dramatically announces her retirement from movies. Guest stars: Joan Fontaine (as herself) and Don Beddoe.
31	6	"Suspension"	Unknown	Unknown	October 25, 1957
Alternative title: "Suspicion." Hafter suspends Howard and Eve when they refuse to do a movie he has lined up for them. Soon bored by their inactivity, the Adamses conspire to go back to work for Hafter — without doing the movie. Guest star: Howard McNear.
32	7	"The Life Story of Eve Drake and Howard Adams"	Unknown	Unknown	November 1, 1957
Hafter decides he wants to make a movie that tells the life stories of Howard and Eve. He assigns two screenwriters to come up with an interesting screenplay by gathering biographical details from the Adamses — and the writers quickly discern that Howard's and Eve's stories do not align with one another and that any resemblance to the truth in their accounts may be entirely coincidental. Guest stars: Herbert Anderson and Les Tremayne.
33	8	"The Comedians"	Unknown	Unknown	November 8, 1957
In the belief that Howard and Eve would enjoy greater popularity if they were funnier, the studio assigns people to improve their comedic abilities, leading to some drastic steps for the Adamses. Guest stars: Sam Hanks (as himself) and Herb Vigran.
34	9	"Man With Raven"	Unknown	Unknown	November 15, 1957
After Howard decides to play the role of Richard III he invites a grandiose, old-school actor, Gerald Fortescue, to stay in the Adams home and help him prepare for the role — and after moving in with his pet raven, Scaramouche, the freeloading Fortescue refuses to leave. Guest stars: Sir Cedric Hardwicke and Don Diamond.
35	10	"The Artist"	Unknown	Unknown	November 22, 1957
When a well-known but controversial and egotistical artist asks Eve to sit for a portrait so that he can paint the “real woman” within her, she is flattered — but Howard is skeptical of the artist's motives, and Eve enjoys it when Howard becomes jealous.
36	11	"Active Duty"	Unknown	Unknown	November 29, 1957
When Howard is called up for two weeks of active duty with the United States Air Force Reserve, Eve decides to follow him to the United States Air Force base where he is stationed. She arrives in grand style as a famous Hollywood actress, becoming the center of attention as she entertains the servicemen — and aggravating problems Howard is having with his commanding officer. Guest stars: Bob Quarry, Mark Patscott, and Walter Coy.
37	12	"The Las Vegas Story"	Unknown	Unknown	December 6, 1957
While Howard and Eve are in Nevada, the studio arranges for Howard to judge a beauty contest in Las Vegas — and Eve must control her emotions when Howard seems to be enjoying himself too much. Guest stars: Patricia Blake, Jamie O'Hara, and Juli Reding.
38	13	"The Producers"	Unknown	Unknown	December 13, 1957
Howard and Eve head for a small town in the Midwestern United States to produce a movie that tells a simple story derived from real life about a boy and his dog, using amateur actors — and quickly decide that they made a mistake by hiring a famous but temperamental Italian as the director for the film.
39	14	"The First Mrs. Adams"	Unknown	Unknown	December 20, 1957
Howard's plans for a second honeymoon with Eve go awry when a woman named Molly announces that she is Howard's first wife — and that they were never divorced.
40	15	"The Service Story"	Unknown	Unknown	December 27, 1957
When Howard and Eve perform at a United States Army base, they are surprised when Howard gets all the attention in the darkened auditorium, and Howard wonders why wolf whistles from the audience seem to be directed at him. The Adamses find out why when the lights come up. Guest stars: Nancy Hadley, Barbara Bell Wright, Mary McCoy, and Carol Shannon.
41	16	"The Flack"	Unknown	Unknown	January 10, 1958
After the Adamses are disappointed not to get picked for two good acting jobs, they hire a publicity agent to boost their careers — but the publicity stunts he dreams up for them all backfire and only make things worse. Guest stars: Chet Stratton and Nancy Kilgas.
42	17	"Jungle Madness"	Unknown	Unknown	January 17, 1958
Howard and Eve are making a movie Max is directing on location in the Congo, and their guide is a ham with delusions of grandeur who keeps upstaging them. They decide to bring him down a bit. Meanwhile, a white hunter takes a romantic interest in Eve. Guest stars: Ben Wright and N. J. Davis.
43	18	"Me, the Jury"	Unknown	Unknown	January 24, 1958
While Eve is making a movie, she is called to jury duty and insists that she must fulfill her responsibilities as a citizen and report for it — but her fame turns out to be a distraction. Guest star: Virginia Gregg.
44	19	"The Inheritance"	Unknown	Unknown	January 31, 1958
Eve is thrilled when she inherits a castle on the moors of Scotland and wants to go there and look over her new property — but Howard objects to the trip, because it would mean passing up the best movie roles the Adamses ever have been offered. Guest star: Hope Emerson.
45	20	"The Big Top"	Unknown	Unknown	February 7, 1958
Howard and Eve go on location in Mexico to make a movie about a circus. Max, who is directing the film, likes realism and wants the Adamses to do their own trapeze stunts, so he arranges for them to work with two real trapeze artists. Trouble ensues when Howard has a falling out with one of the trapeze artists, a headstrong man who Howard believes loves Eve. Guest star: Mary Scott.
46	21	"Come On to Mars' House"	Richard Kinon	Sol Saks	February 11, 1958
While the studio is filming a Roman epic, Hafter hires an astrologer. Everyone on the set falls for her predictions except for Howard, and production of the movie grinds to a halt as a result. Howard then shows Eve how troublesome the astrologer's predictions are and sets out to prove to everyone that astrology is bunk.
47	22	"Backwash"	Unknown	Unknown	February 18, 1958
Howard is offered the chance to direct a movie, and Eve supports him enthusiastically — but when he reads the script, he fears the film will be a flop. Guest stars: Dick Powell (as himself).
48	23	"Surprise! Surprise!"	Unknown	Unknown	March 4, 1958
Eve plans to throw a surprise birthday party for Howard. Howard insists that his birthday means nothing to him, however, and decides to sit at home in his pajamas all day, complicating her plans.
49	24	"The Writers"	Unknown	Unknown	March 11, 1958
After completing a movie for the studio, Howard and Eve decide that they are unhappy with the scripts for their movies and that they could write a much better script for their next film themselves. They demand a chance to write it, and Hafter agrees — but then they encounter nothing but trouble in their scriptwriting efforts.
50	25	"Platter Palace"	Unknown	Unknown	March 18, 1958
Elsie writes a hit song. She does not know how to handle her unexpected fame, so Howard and Eve offer their advice.
51	26	"Brought to You Dead from Hollywood"	Unknown	Unknown	March 25, 1958
Howard and Eve are cast in a live television production and worry about everything that could go wrong. Guest star: George Feldman.
52	27	"Back Page"	Unknown	Unknown	April 1, 1958
When Ed Sullivan asks them to guest-write a column for him in an entertainment newspaper, Howard and Eve quickly imagine having a successful journalism career and winning a Pulitzer Prize — but when they head out into the city to gather information for their column, they find out how hard journalism really is. Guest star: Ed Sullivan (as himself).
53	28	"U.C.L.A. – Eh!"	Unknown	Unknown	April 8, 1958
For self-improvement, Howard and Eve take a college class on the Etruscan Age. In class, they practically rewrite history, questioning the professor because the version of history he is teaching differs from the one told by a movie they starred in.
54	29	"The Lovey Doveys"	Unknown	Unknown	April 15, 1958
Howard and Eve host a newly married couple from out of town who won a "perfect marriage" contest on a television program. The Adamses soon are worn out by the constant round of nightclubs they visit in an effort to show the couple a good time. Guest stars: Joan Banks and Casey Adams.
55	30	"Howard and Eve and Ida"	Richard Kinon	Louella MacFarlane	April 22, 1958
At Howard's suggestion, Hafter hires Ida Lupino to direct a movie starring Howard and Eve. Howard does not realize that Eve is insanely jealous of Lupino, whom Howard used to date and who closely resumbles Eve. Eve gives Lupino a very hard time at first, and when Lupino decides to cut one of Eve's big scenes and instead spend more time on a fight scene Howard is in, Eve is convinced she is trying to steal Howard from her. Just as Eve is about to leave Howard, she realizes a remarkable thing about Lupino and comes to realize that Lupino is a good person — and when Lupino gets fired for pushing her artistic vision, Eve comes to her defense. Ida Lupino plays both Eve Adams and herself.
56	31	"The Original MacDuffs"	Unknown	Unknown	April 29, 1958
After Howard and Eve overhear a telephone conversation in which Hafter grants many concessions to another star, they make the same demands. Hafter turns them down, telling them he made the concessions because the other star owns a ranch and is independently wealthy — so Howard and Eve decide to improve their bargaining power with Hafter by buying a ranch of their own. Guest stars: Damian O'Flynn and Carol Veazie.
57	32	"The Ghost of Consolidated"	Unknown	Unknown	May 6, 1958
After a long day at the studio, Howard and Eve decide it is too late to go home and fall asleep in their producer's office. During the night, they awaken to witness a ghostly review on the movie lot by silent film stars including Mary Pickford. Guest stars: Bridget Duff (Duff's and Lupino's real-life daughter), Barbara Heller, and Jesse White.
58	33	"The Bowling Story"	Unknown	Unknown	May 13, 1958
To Hafter's displeasure, Howard and Eve persuade another studio boss to sponsor their bowling team so they can compete against Hafter's.
59	34	"Command Performance"	Unknown	Unknown	May 20, 1958
When Hafter sends Howard and Eve to Europe to promote a new film, they visit a small country ruled by the Grand Duchess Maria to attend a premiere showing of the film. Eve extolls the virtues of democracy to the grand duchess — and even suggests that she abdicate so that the country can become a democracy. Guest stars: Jeanette Nolan and Stephen Bekassy.
60	35	"The Stunt Man"	Unknown	Unknown	May 27, 1958
A neighbor takes a dislike to Howard and Eve, complains to the police about them, then harasses them with phone calls. Eve has been reading up on psychology and devises a plan to cure the bothersome neighbor — but when their attempts to resolve the situation peacefully fail, the Adamses decide to fight fire with fire. Guest stars: Murvyn Vye and Mary Field.
61	36	"The Inventor"	Unknown	Unknown	June 3, 1958
While at a party, Eve is tricked into agreeing to appear on a nationally televised show for an interview with a man known to hate the movie colony. During the interview, she makes an unfortunate remark which makes her look ridiculous and causes outrage. In a later press interview of his own, Howard rises to Eve's defense — and only makes things worse. Guest stars: Norman Alden.
62	37	"The Chowder Cup"	Unknown	Unknown	June 10, 1958
After Howard and Eve buy half-interest in a restaurant, they begin to spend so much time there that it interferes with their acting careers, prompting Hafter to demand that they either give up the restaurant or give up acting.
63	38	"Dear Variety"	Richard Kinon	Jim Fritzell	June 17, 1958
A comedy of errors ensues when Eve reads a 10-year-old copy of Variety, mistaking it for that day's edition. The front page includes an article announcing the closing of Consolidated Studios and firing of Hafter by studio executives in New York City. Thinking it is current news, she publishes an angry goodbye to Hafter as an advertisement in Variety. When confused New York executives see what she published, they have no idea who had decided to fire Hafter, but assume that Hafter deserves to be fired because Variety said he does, and really do fire him. After Eve realizes her mistake, she publishes another ad in Variety which says that executives had changed their minds and decided to reinstate Hafter. The executives in New York, not knowing who had made this decision either, again assume that Variety is right and actually reinstate Hafter, setting everything straight again.
64	39	"Steve's Girlfriend"	Unknown	Unknown	June 24, 1958
Eve decides to find Steve a wife, but her plans suffer a setback when he visits Eve with a beautiful girlfriend of his own choice named Anna, who is visiting the United States on a tourist visa. Anna quickly convinces everyone but Howard and Eve that she is perfect for a part in a movie they are making. They suspect that Anna is just an opportunist taking advantage of Steve, and they feel their suspicions are justified when Anna visits the movie set and is introduced to European actor Derek Von Fleet. Guest stars: Nita Talbot and John Stephenson.
65	40	"Planes That Pass in the Night"	Unknown	Unknown	July 1, 1958
When Howard and Eve decide to take a vacation, he buys tickets to Paris and she buys tickets to Hawaii. Unable to agree on where to go, they decide to play a game of gin rummy, with the winner choosing their vacation site — but confusion ensues, and they end up at different destinations. Guest stars: Alberto Morán and Albert Carrier.
66	41	"Teenage Idol"	Unknown	Unknown	July 8, 1958
Howard and Eve help a lovelorn teenage friend compete with a rock 'n' roll teen singing idol for a girl's attention. Guest stars: Pat Wayne, Carolyn Craig, and Darrell Howe.
