= Richard Kinon =

American television director

Richard Kinon (August 17, 1924 – March 11, 2004) was an American television director. Born in Brooklyn borough of New York City, New York, he was hired at his beginning by the studio in Hollywood as a screenwriter. The house he was living in until his death was built in the 1920s and used to belong to his parents. For many years he stayed on the French Riviera.

Kinon died on March 11, 2004 (aged 79) in Beverly Hills, California.

== Filmography ==
- 1955-1956 : Four Star Playhouse (TV series)
- 1956 : Telephone Time (TV series)
- 1956 : Stage 7 (TV series)
- 1956 : Cavalcade of America (TV series)
- 1956 : Chevron Hall of Stars (TV series)
- 1956 : Richard Diamond, Private Detective (TV series)
- 1957 : Crossroads (TV series)
- 1957-1958 : Mr. Adams and Eve (TV series)
- 1958 : Colonel Humphrey Flack (TV series)
- 1958-1959 : The Thin Man (TV series)
- 1959 : The Gale Storm Show (TV series)
- 1959-1965 : Perry Mason (TV series)
- 1960-1961 :Dante (TV series)
- 1960 : Bachelor Father (TV series)
- 1961 : The Tab Hunter Show (TV series)
- 1961 : Pete and Gladys (TV series)
- 1961 : The Tom Ewell Show (TV series)
- 1961 : The Hathaways (TV series)
- 1961-1962 : The Gertrude Berg Show (TV series)
- 1962 : Kraft Mystery Theater (TV series)
- 1963 : Ensign O'Toole (TV series)
- 1963-1964 : Harry's Girls (TV series)
- 1964 : Summer Playhouse (TV series)
- 1964-1965 : The Rogues (TV series)
- 1964-1965 : Burke's Law (TV series)
- 1965 : Vacation Playhouse (TV series)
- 1965 : Mister Roberts (TV series)
- 1965 : Hank (TV series)
- 1965-1966 : The Patty Duke Show (TV series)
- 1965-1966 : The Farmer's Daughter (TV series)
- 1966 : The Jean Arthur Show (TV series)
- 1966-1967 : Please Don't Eat the Daisies (TV series)
- 1966-1967 : Occasional Wife (TV series)
- 1967 : Love on a Rooftop (TV series)
- 1967 : Captain Nice (TV series)
- 1967 : Bewitched (TV series)
- 1967-1968 : The Second Hundred Years (TV series)
- 1968 : Off to See the Wizard (TV series)
- 1968 : I Dream of Jeannie (TV series)
- 1968-1970 : The Flying Nun (TV series)
- 1968-1970 : Here Come the Brides (TV series)
- 1968-1970 : Hogan's Heroes (TV series)
- 1968-1971 : That Girl (TV series)
- 1969 : The Bill Cosby Show (TV series)
- 1970-1971 : Nanny and the Professor (TV series)
- 1970-1972 : Room 222 (TV series)
- 1971 : Arnie (TV series)
- 1971 : Getting Together (TV series)
- 1971-1974 : The Doris Day Show (TV series)
- 1971-1974 : The Partridge Family (TV series)
- 1972 : Me and the Chimp (TV series)
- 1972-1973 : Bridget Loves Bernie (TV series)
- 1972-1974 : Love, American Style (TV series)
- 1972-1974 : Temperatures Rising (TV series)
- 1973 : Roll Out! (TV series)
- 1973-1974 : The Girl with Something Extra (TV series)
- 1974 : ABC Afterschool Specials (TV series)
- 1975 : Barney Miller (TV series)
- 1975 : The Bob Newhart Show (TV series)
- 1975-1976 : Fay (TV series)
- 1976 : The Love Boat (TV movie)
- 1976 : The Practice (TV series)
- 1976 : Wonder Woman (TV series)
- 1976 : Holmes & Yo-Yo (TV series)
- 1976-1980 : Family (TV series)
- 1977-1986 : The Love Boat (TV series)
- 1981 : Aloha Paradise (TV series)
- 1981 : Dynasty (TV series)
- 1983-1984 : Fame (TV series)
- 1983-1988 : Hotel (TV series)
- 1987 : The Colbys (TV series)

== Awards and nominations ==
Kinon was nominated in 1959 for an Primetime Emmy Award for Best Direction of a Single Program of a Comedy Series for the Mr. Adams and Eve episode "The Interview" (1958).
