= Harper Valley PTA (TV series) =

American sitcom television series

- Anne Francine and Barbara Eden
- Also known as: Harper Valley
- Genre: Sitcom
- Created by: Sherwood Schwartz
- Based on: Characters created by George Edwards
- Starring: Barbara Eden; Fannie Flagg; Jenn Thompson; Anne Francine; Bridget Hanley; Rod McCary; George Gobel; Mills Watson
- Opening theme: "Harper Valley PTA", originally performed by Jeannie C. Riley
- Country of origin: United States
- No. of seasons: 2
- No. of episodes: 30

Production
- Running time: 30 minutes (per episode)
- Production companies: Redwood Productions (season 1); Ten-Four Productions (season 2); Universal Television

Original release
- Network: NBC
- Release: January 16, 1981 – August 14, 1982

Related
- Harper Valley PTA (1978 film)

Harper Valley PTA (known simply as Harper Valley during its second season) is an American sitcom television series based on the 1978 film of the same name, which was itself based on the 1968 country song of the same name recorded by singer Jeannie C. Riley and written by Tom T. Hall. The series, starring Barbara Eden who reprised her role from the film, aired on NBC from January 16, 1981, to August 14, 1982.

== Synopsis ==
The series went on to flesh out the story in the song, as it told of the adventures of Stella Johnson (Barbara Eden), a widowed single mother to teenager Dee (Jenn Thompson), who lived in the fictional town of Harper Valley, Ohio.

The town was dominated by the namesakes of the founder, the Harper family, most prominently represented by the mayor, Otis Harper, Jr (George Gobel).

Mrs. Johnson's flouting of the small town's conventions, and exposure of the hypocrisy of many of its other notorious residents, provided the humor.

Her most notable foes were the wealthy and completely snobbish Reilly family, which consisted of the snobby head of the family, Flora (Anne Francine); her snotty daughter, Wanda (Bridget Hanley); her husband, Bobby, (Rod McCary) and their daughter, Scarlett (Suzi Dean). The stuck-up Scarlett was mainly Dee's nemesis, just as her mother and grandmother were Stella's arch-enemies.

In the show's early episodes, Mrs. Johnson had been recently elected to the board of directors of the PTA and this was the source of most of the show's plots (two of the other members were Vivian Washburn (Mari Gorman) and Willamae Jones (Edie McClurg)); later it was decided that this idea had been carried about as far as was practical and the PTA aspect was dropped from the show, which was then retitled Harper Valley.

During this phase, Stella's relationship with Dee was more prominent and actor Mills Watson joined the cast as Stella's eccentric uncle, Winslow Homer Smith. Nicknamed Buster, he was an inventor whose inventions never worked the way they were supposed to.

Stella still did battle with the Reilly clan on occasion. Her best friend was Cassie Bowman, a reporter for the town's paper (Fannie Flagg).

At various times, Stella had to deal with her evil twin, Della Smith (played by Barbara Eden wearing a black wig), much as she had when she was on her more famous series, I Dream of Jeannie, when she played her evil twin sister, Jeannie II.

The show ran from January 1981 to August 1982 on NBC; it was later released into syndication to local stations briefly in the mid-1980s, even though there were too few episodes made for it to be normally syndicated. Cable television network TV Land showed reruns of the show in 2000.

== Broadcast history ==
Season	Time
1980–81	Friday at 8:00–8:30
1981–82	Thursday at 8:00–8:30 (October 29 – November 19, 1981); Saturday at 9:00–9:30 (December 12, 1981 – January 2, 1982; April 10 – May 1, 1982); Saturday at 8:30–9:00 (January 23 – February 27, 1982)

== Episodes ==
=== Season 1 (1981) ===
No. overall	No. in season	Title	Directed by	Written by	Original release date
1	1	"To Dunk or Not to Dunk"	Bruce Bilson	Sherwood Schwartz & Lloyd J. Schwartz	January 16, 1981
2	2	"A Husband for Stella"	Alan Myerson	Jordan Moffet	January 23, 1981
3	3	"Mail and Female"	Alan Myerson	Jerry Ross	January 30, 1981
Stella poses as an oil-rich real estate investor to get back at Flora Reilly for tampering with her mail.
4	4	"Don Juan and Two"	Claudio Guzmán	David P. Harmon	February 6, 1981
5	5	"The Life of Reilly"	Sigmund Neufeld Jr.	Brad Radnitz	February 13, 1981
6	6	"Stella, the Reilly Girl"	Richard Bennett	Joan Brooker & Alexandra Stoddart	February 20, 1981
7	7	"Moonlighting Becomes You"	Bruce Bilson	Gordon Mitchell	March 6, 1981
8	8	"A Tree Grows in Harper Valley"	George Tyne	Warren Murray	March 13, 1981
9	9	"Dirty Tricks"	Claudio Guzman	Dianne & Lou Messina	March 20, 1981
When the Reillys accuse Stella of being a hooker, Stella gets back using the theory of letting the punishment fit the crime.
10	10	"Stella and Howard"	Bruce Bilson	Sherwood Schwartz and Lloyd J. Schwartz	March 27, 1981
11	11	"Mayor Bobby"	Sigmund Neufeld Jr.	Jordan Moffet	April 3, 1981
12	12	"My Fair Stella"	Claudio Guzman	Phil Mishkin & Judy Gabriel	April 10, 1981
Rumors start flying when Stella works with a handsome and married English teacher on her acceptance speech for an award.
13	13	"Bad Day at Harper Valley"	Claudio Guzman	Richard Freiman	April 17, 1981

=== Season 2 (1981–82) ===
No. overall	No. in season	Title	Directed by	Written by	Original release date
14	1	"Make Room for Uncle Buster"	Rod Daniel	William Dial	October 29, 1981
Stella's penniless Uncle Buster arrives on her doorstep with his latest invention.
15	2	"Good for the Goose...Sauce for the Gander"	Ron Daniel	Ron Friedman	November 5, 1981
Wanda Taylor kicks her husband out, then enlists Stella's help in getting him back.
16	3	"Reunion Fever"	Dick Harwood	Susan Misty Stewart	November 12, 1981
At a class reunion, a former schoolmate sweeps Cassie off her feet.
17	4	"$500 Misunderstanding"	Nick Havinga	Malcolm & Amy Webb	November 19, 1981
Scarlett Taylor doesn't want to share her winnings when a lottery ticket that she bought with borrowed money pays off.
18	5	"Stella's Scam"	Alan Bergman	Charles Isaacs	December 5, 1981
Flora Reilly hits the roof when she learns Stella has been given a job as a receptionist at City Hall.
19	6	"Flora's Dinner Party"	Rod Daniel	Jerry Davis	December 12, 1981
20	7	"I'm Dreaming of a Harper Valley Christmas"	William Asher	Jackie McKane & Joel Tappis	December 19, 1981
21	8	"Low Noon"	Alan Cooke	David Hackel & Steve Hattman	January 9, 1982
22	9	"The Show Must Go On"	Alan Myerson	Jerry Rannow	January 16, 1982
23	10	"Svengali of the Valley"	Alan Myerson	Daid Hackel & Steve Hattman	January 23, 1982
24	11	"Firechief Follies"	Les Martinson	Donald Ross	January 30, 1982
25	12	"Stella Della"	William Asher	Jerry Rannow	February 13, 1982
26	13	"Stella Rae"	William Asher	Judy Gabriel & Philip Mishkin	February 27, 1982
Stella and her fellow city workers go on strike.
27	14	"Harper Valley Hoedown"	William Asher	Michael Weinberger	April 10, 1982
28	15	"Grizzly Gap"	Alan Cooke	David Hackel & Steve Hattman	April 17, 1982
29	16	"The Return of Charlie's Chow Palace"	William Asher	Greg Strangis	April 24, 1982
30	17	"Harper Valley Sentinel"	Rod Daniel	Jerry Davis	May 1, 1982
