= E. W. Swackhamer =

American film director (1927–1994)

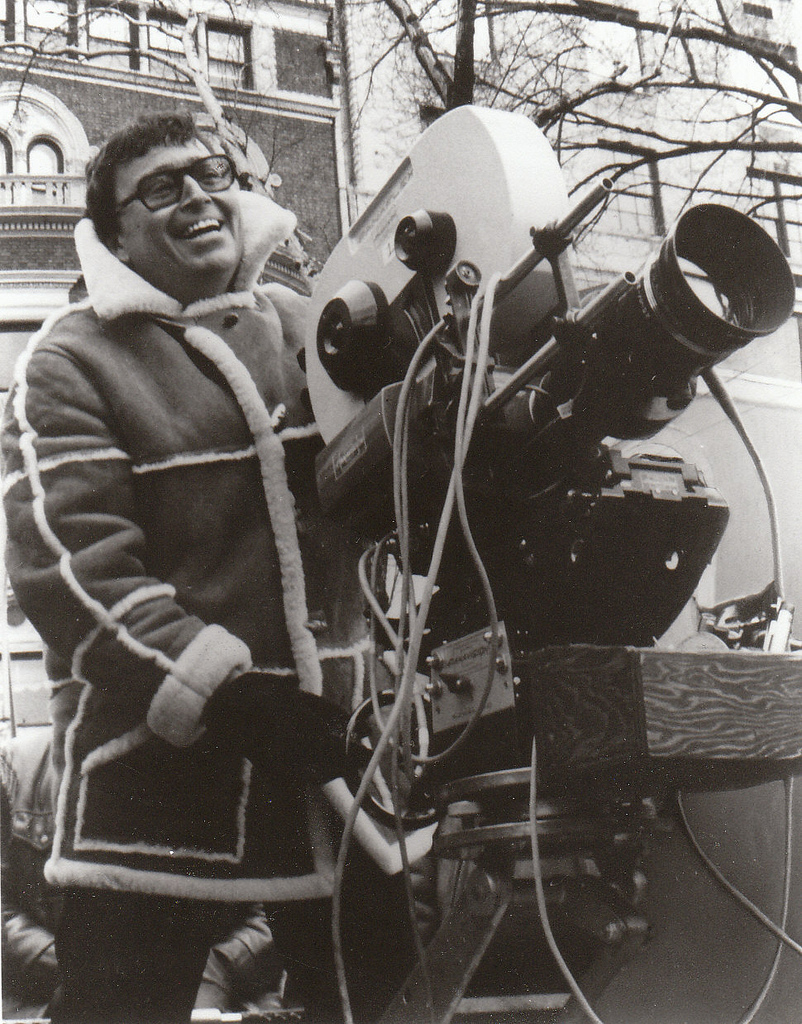
- Swackhamer in New York, circa 1990, directing an episode of Law & Order
- Born: Egbert Warnderink Swackhamer; January 17, 1927; Middletown Township, New Jersey, U.S.
- Died: December 5, 1994 (aged 67); Berlin, Germany
- Occupations: Film director, film producer, television director
- Years active: 1961–1994
- Spouse: Bridget Hanley (m. 1969)

Egbert Warnderink "E. W." Swackhamer Jr. (January 17, 1927 – December 5, 1994) was an American television and film director.

== Career ==
Swackhamer's credits included M*A*S*H, L.A. Law, Murder, She Wrote, Bewitched, The Partridge Family, The Flying Nun, and Law & Order. Of the 27 pilots for television series directed by Swackhamer, 18 went into regular production, including Eight Is Enough, Quincy, M.E., S.W.A.T. and Nancy Drew.

Swackhamer was the stage manager for the original Broadway production of Cat on a Hot Tin Roof. He went to Hollywood in 1961, after working on and off-Broadway and for national companies as an actor, stage manager and director. Swackhamer received an Emmy Award for directing the six-hour miniseries The Dain Curse during the 1977–78 season.

He was the father of Ten Eyck Swackhamer and Elizabeth Swackhamer with his first wife, Gretchen Shane. He married actress Bridget Hanley on April 26, 1969. They had two daughters.

He was working as a director on Star Command at the time of his death, of a ruptured aortic aneurysm, on December 5, 1994.

== Selected filmography ==
- The Cosby Mysteries (2 episodes, 1994)
- MacShayne: The Final Roll of the Dice (1994) (TV)
- Law & Order (8 episodes, 1990–1993)
- The Secret Passion of Robert Clayton (1992) (TV)
- Are You Lonesome Tonight (1992) (TV)
- Lookwell (1991) (TV)
- Columbo: Columbo Goes to College (1990) (TV)
- Jake and the Fatman (8 episodes, 1987–1990)
- H.E.L.P. (1990) TV series (unknown episodes)
- In the Heat of the Night (2 episodes, 1989)
- Christine Cromwell - "Things That Go Bump in the Night" (1989) TV episode
- Desperado: The Outlaw Wars (1989) (TV)
- Murder, She Wrote - "Deadpan" (1988) TV episode
- Desperado: The Return of Desperado (1988) (TV)
- The Wizard (3 episodes, 1986)
- L.A. Law - "The House of the Rising Flan" (1986) TV episode
- Bridge Across Time (1985) (TV)
- The Rousters (1983) (TV)
- Malibu (1983) (TV)
- Cocaine and Blue Eyes (1983) (TV)
- Carpool (1983) (TV)
- Disneyland - "Tales of the Apple Dumpling Gang" (1982) TV episode
- The Oklahoma City Dolls (1981) (TV)
- Longshot (1981)
- Tenspeed and Brown Shoe - "Pilot" (1980) TV episode
- The Death of Ocean View Park (1979) (TV)
- Vampire (1979) (TV)
- The Winds of Kitty Hawk (1978) (TV)
- The Dain Curse (1978) TV mini-series
- Family (2 episodes, 1977)
- Spider-Man (1977) (TV)
- Eight Is Enough - "Never Try Eating Nectarines Since Juice May Dispense" (1977) TV episode
- The Hardy Boys/Nancy Drew Mysteries - "The Mystery of Pirate's Cove" (1977) TV episode
- Once an Eagle (1976) TV mini-series
- Quincy, M.E. - "Go Fight City Hall... to the Death" (1976) TV episode
- Death at Love House (1976) (TV)
- McCloud (4 episodes, 1975–1976)
- Switch (2 episodes, 1975)
- S.W.A.T. - "S.W.A.T.: Part 1" (1975) TV episode
- The Rookies (11 episodes, 1972–1975)
- Death Sentence (1974)
- Chopper One (2 episodes, 1974)
- The New Perry Mason (2 episodes, 1973)
- Roll Out - "The Paper Caper" (1973) TV episode
- The Girl with Something Extra - "No Benefit of Doubt" (1973) TV episode
- The Partridge Family (8 episodes, 1970–1973)
- Anna and the King - "The Chimes" (1972) TV episode
- Bonanza - "Stallion" (1972) TV episode
- Owen Marshall, Counselor at Law - "The Trouble with Ralph" (1972) TV episode
- M*A*S*H - "Chief Surgeon Who?" (1972) TV episode
- Bewitched (8 episodes, 1965–1972)
- Gidget Gets Married (1972) (TV)
- Love, American Style (1971) TV episode (segment "Love and the Reincarnation")
- The Young Rebels - "Fort Hope" (1970) TV episode
- Here Come the Brides (6 episodes, 1968–1969)
- The Outcasts (2 episodes, 1968–1969)
- The Flying Nun (9 episodes, 1967–1968)
- Love on a Rooftop (12 episodes, 1966–1967)
- Hazel (7 episodes, 1965–1966)
- Gidget (8 episodes, 1965–1966)
- I Dream of Jeannie (5 episodes, 1965–1966)
- The Donna Reed Show (2 episodes, 1965)
- The Lieutenant - "O'Rourke" (1964) TV episode
