= Donald Ross (writer) =

American television screenwriter (1942-2018)

- Born: June 18, 1942
- Died: June 1, 2018 (aged 75); Los Angeles, California, U.S.
- Occupations: Writer; producer
- Spouse: Patti Deutsch (m. 1968; died 2017)
- Children: 3

Donald Ross (June 18, 1942 – June 1, 2018) was an American television screenwriter and producer, known for writing television shows such as The Love Boat; Murder, She Wrote and Hart to Hart. Ross was married to actress Patti Deutsch.

== Career ==
In a career spanning over 30 years, Ross wrote primarily for television including variety shows, comedies and dramas: This Is Tom Jones, Dinah!, Diff'rent Strokes, The Love Boat, Matlock and Murder, She Wrote, for which he wrote the final episode. A lifelong fan of jazz music, Ross produced and wrote material for the Timex All-Star Swing Festival (1972), which won the Peabody and Christopher Award.

== Personal life ==
Ross graduated from Boston University. He met his wife Patti Deutsch during her early improv years. They married in 1968 and had three children together. Both Ross and Deutsch appeared as guests on game shows throughout the 1970s such as Match Game and Tattletales. Ross died on June 1, 2018, from cancer. He bequeathed his entire jazz collection to the ARChive of Contemporary Music.

== Selected filmography ==
=== Television ===
- Harper Valley PTA (1982) – writer
- This Is Tom Jones (1970–1971) – writer
- Diff'rent Strokes (1980–1982) – writer
- Hart to Hart (1979–1983) – writer-story editor
- The Love Boat (1981–1985) – writer
- Hardcastle and McCormick (1986) – writer
- Matlock (1986) – writer
- Charles in Charge (1988) – writer
- Hart to Hart: Two Harts in 3/4 Time – teleplay writer
- Murder, She Wrote (1987–1996) – writer-story editor

=== Film ===
- Hamburger: The Motion Picture (1986) – producer
