= List of Temperatures Rising episodes =

The original cast of Temperatures Rising consisted of (l to r) Nancy Fox, Cleavon Little, Joan Van Ark, James Whitmore, and Reva Rose

Temperatures Rising is an American television sitcom that aired for two years on the ABC network, during which time it was presented in three different formats and cast line-ups with a total of 46 episodes. The series was originally developed, produced, and occasionally directed by William Asher for Ashmont Productions and Screen Gems and premiered on September 12, 1972, in the time slot of Tuesday nights at 8:00 PM. The regular cast consisted of Cleavon Little as Dr. Jerry Noland, Joan Van Ark as Nurse Annie Carlisle, Reva Rose as Nurse Mildred "Millie" MacInerny, Nancy Fox as Student Nurse Ellen Turner, and James Whitmore as Dr. Vincent Campanelli. Bernie Kopell and Ketty Lester appeared in recurring roles as Harold Lefkowitz and Nurse Ferguson. The premise of the series featured Campanelli as the no-nonsense chief-of-staff of Capitol General, a (fictional) Washington, D.C. hospital, who is forced to deal with the outlandish antics of Noland and the three nurses, whom Campanelli refers to as "the four horsemen of aggravation". During its first season—and first format—26 episodes were aired with the final one broadcast on March 27, 1973. Reruns of the season's episodes continued until September 4, 1973.

Despite heavy competition in the ratings from Maude on CBS and Bonanza on NBC, Temperatures Rising did well enough in its first season to be renewed for a second. For this second season, John Mitchell, the head of Screen Gems, decided to replace James Whitmore with comedian Paul Lynde, whose own sitcom, The Paul Lynde Show (also produced by William Asher for the 1972–73 season) was to be cancelled. Asher was against the change and declined to continue with Temperatures Rising, resulting in him being replaced as producer by Duke Vincent and Bruce Johnson. Under them, Van Ark, Rose, and Fox were dropped from the cast along with Whitmore, thus retaining Little as the only returning member. The New Temperatures Rising Show, as the series was now retitled, began airing on September 25, 1973, and starred Paul Lynde as Dr. Paul Mercy, Sudie Bond as his mother Martha Mercy, Barbara Cason as Miss Tillis, the head nurse, Jennifer Darling as Nurse "Windy" Winchester, Jeff Morrow as Dr. Lloyd Axton, and Cleavon Little as Dr. Jerry Noland, while Jerry Houser was featured in a recurring role as an intern named Haskell. After only two episodes, Morrow was replaced by John Dehner as Dr. Charles Cleveland Claver. In this season Mercy was presented as the penny-pinching chief-of-staff, with his nagging mother as the owner of the hospital. Little's character was changed to the chief surgeon and "the only sane member of this medical madhouse".

The New Temperatures Rising Show ran for 13 episodes before being placed on hiatus on January 8, 1974. The ratings for the show were poor and, as a result, Mitchell asked Asher to return to the series as the producer and restore it to its original format—albeit with Paul Lynde continuing in the lead. For the third format of the series—which reverted to the original title of Temperatures Rising—Bond, Cason, Darling, Dehner, and Houser were dropped from the cast while Lynde and Little continued as, respectively, Dr. Mercy and Dr. Nolan. Added to the line-up were Alice Ghostley as Nurse Edwina Moffitt, sister of Dr. Mercy, and Barbara Rucker as Nurse Kelly, while Nancy Fox, from the first-season cast, returned as Nurse Ellen Turner. Offered as a summer replacement on Thursday nights, the third format of the sitcom ran for seven episodes from July 18 to August 29, 1974, after which it was canceled permanently.

== Overview ==
Season	Episodes	Originally released	
Season	Episodes	First released	Last released
Season 1	26	September 12, 1972	March 27, 1973
Season 2 (original run)	13	September 25, 1973	January 8, 1974
Season 2 (summer replacement)	7	July 18, 1974	August 29, 1974

Cast
Role	Played by	First Season	Second Season	
Role	Played by	First Season	Original run	Summer replacement
Dr. Jerry Noland	Cleavon Little	Main	Main	Main
Nurse Annie Carlisle	Joan Van Ark	Main		
Nurse Mildred MacInerny	Reva Rose	Main		
Student Nurse Ellen Turner	Nancy Fox	Main		Main
Dr. Vincent Campanelli	James Whitmore	Main		
Harold Lefkowitz	Bernie Kopell	Recurring		
Nurse Ferguson	Ketty Lester	Recurring		
Dr. Paul Mercy	Paul Lynde		Main	Main
Martha Mercy	Sudie Bond		Main	
Miss Tillis	Barbara Cason		Main	
Dr. Lloyd Axton	Jeff Morrow		Main^{[note a]}	
Dr. Charles Cleveland Claver	John Dehner		Main^{[note b]}	
Nurse Windy Winchester	Jennifer Darling		Main	
Haskell	Jerry Houser		Recurring	
Edwina Moffitt	Alice Ghostley			Main^{[note c]}
Nurse Amanda Kelly	Barbara Rucker			Main
Notes: a. Replaced after only two episodes; b. Replacement for Jeff Morrow; c. Alice Ghostley appeared as a different character in one of the first season episodes

== Episodes ==
=== Season 1: Temperatures Rising (1972–73) ===
Starring Cleavon Little as Dr. Jerry Noland, Joan Van Ark as Nurse Annie Carlisle, Reva Rose as Nurse Mildred "Millie" MacInerny, Nancy Fox as Student Nurse Ellen Turner, and James Whitmore as Dr. Vincent Campanelli. Beginning part-way through the season, Bernie Kopell appeared in three episodes as orderly Harold Lefkowitz and Ketty Lester also appeared in three episodes as Nurse Ferguson.

Temperatures Rising was pre-empted twice during its initial run. The first was on November 7, 1972, for the presidential election; the second was on January 23, 1973, for the NBA All-Star Game. The broadcast of December 26, 1972, was a rerun of "Operation Fastball", the series' second episode.

Reruns of Temperatures Rising were broadcast on a regular basis from April 3 to September 4, 1973. During this period the series was preempted three times: April 24 for the animated special Cricket in Times Square, June 19 for the musical special Roberta Flack: The First Time Ever, and July 17 for Chicago in the Rookies. In between the last rerun of the first season and the first episode of the second season ABC aired two specials: Furst Family of Washington on September 11, 1973, and Egan on September 18, 1973.

No. overall	No. in season	Title	Directed by	Written by	Original release date
1	1	"Operation Bingo"	William Asher	Sheldon Keller	September 12, 1972
To help the father (Ned Glass) of a young intern (David Bailey), Dr. Noland and nurses Carlisle, MacInerny, and Turner develop a bingo game that will be broadcast in code over the hospital's public address system. Noland and the nurses enlist numerous patients and staff members in their scheme. When one of the patients, curmudgeonly Senator Farnstock (Jack Albertson), gleefully announces that he is the winner, a furious Dr. Campanelli learns what has been going on at the hospital.
2	2	"Operation Fastball"	William Asher	Michael Morris	September 19, 1972
A young baseball player (Mwako Cumbuka) is hoping to be spotted by some major league talent scouts who are due to pass through town in a few weeks. However, he is suffering from bursitis in his shoulder, for which Dr. Noland plans to perform a secret operation in the maternity ward. Meanwhile, Dr. Campanelli has his hands full dealing with two particularly picky hospital inspectors (Ed Platt and Milt Kamen).
3	3	"The Appointment"	William Asher	Sam Locke & Milton Pascal	September 26, 1972
Nolan's latest scheme to raise money for the hospital is to have staff members and patients (one played by Charlotte Rae) make bets to guess the combined weight of all babies born in one day. In the meantime, gruff but lovable Dr. Campanelli has been offered the position of director of the United States Public Health Service. To keep him from accepting this position, Noland and nurses Carlisle, MacInerney, and Turner persuade one of the hospital's janitors (David Huddleston) to pose as Campanelli's potential replacement.
4	4	"Ellen's Flip Side"	Jerry London	Elroy Schwartz	October 3, 1972
A wealthy but miserly hospital patient (Charles Lane) wants in on the numbers racket that Noland is running. Meanwhile, another patient (Alice Ghostley) has a dreaded fear of doctors. To cure her of this Noland poses as an effeminate hairdresser who hypnotizes her and then convinces her to love and trust doctors. By accident, however, he hypnotizes Ellen as well, thus turning the usually demure student nurse into the hospital vamp.
5	5	"The Muscle and the Medic"	Charles Rondeau	Martin Ragaway	October 10, 1972
Russo (John Astin), a hypochondriac mobster, is treated by Noland while the thugs in his employ are making amorous advances on nurses Carlisle, MacInerny, and Turner. After Noland performs an operation on his pancreas, Russo forces Noland to become his personal physician. However, when Noland shows a romantic interest in Russo's pretty daughter (Elaine Giftos), the mobster has a change of mind. Edward Andrews and Chuck McCann also appear in this episode.
6	6	"The Accident Con"	Alan Rafkin	Laurence Marks	October 17, 1972
Without Dr. Campanelli's permission, Noland has authorized an ambulance to be used to pick up a roulette wheel for another one of his money-making schemes. However, on the way back to the hospital the ambulance driver had accidentally hit a pedestrian (Sorrell Booke). Now the man is claiming to be paralyzed and, with his wife (Helen Verbit), is suing the hospital for damages. Hence it is up to "four horsemen of aggravation" to find a way to expose the scheming couple as frauds.
7	7	"Good Luck, Lefkowitz"	Jerry London	Sheldon Keller	October 24, 1972
Capitol General has a new staff member, Harold "Good Luck" Lefkowitz (Bernie Kopell), an orderly who has a reputation for being a jinx and causing numerous disasters. Thus it up to Dr. Noland to fix the problem and prove that Harold is actually a valid member of the staff. Adding to the dilemma is a new patient, famed television gossip columnist Adele Brandon (Jayne Meadows), who is taking note of all the hijinks going on in the hospital. However, Miss Brandon also takes a shine to Dr. Campanelli.
8	8	"Tenor Loving Care"	Bruce Bilson	Joseph Bonaduce	October 31, 1972
Italian opera tenor Renzo Malaporte (John Myhers) has been admitted to Capitol General to reduce weight. His temperamental behavior causes havoc and, during an argument with Campanelli, loses the use of his voice. When Ellen states that the singer yelled at her, Noland concludes that Malaporte's vocal problem is psychosomatic. So Noland concocts a scheme to restore his voice by threatening him with "competition"; namely hospital cook Billy (Tony Holland) lip-syncing to Malaporte's own recordings. Elliott Reid appears as Malaporte's manager.
9	9	"Rx – Love"	Richard Kinon	Sheldon Keller	November 14, 1972
Dr. Campanelli has been extra grouchy lately and Noland figures that he must be suffering from a lack of romance in his life. With the help of Annie, Millie, and Ellen, Noland schemes to introduce him to an attractive woman. Their attempts fail but Campanelli finds himself falling in love with Claudia Turner (Beverly Garland), Ellen's attractive aunt and a top fashion designer. However, when Claudia turns down Campanelli's marriage proposal he resorts back to his usual grouchy self.
10	10	"Lights, Camera, Action"	Richard Kinon	Roy Kammerman	November 21, 1972
A group of television filmmakers come to Capitol General to make a documentary about modern hospital life and Campanelli assigns Noland to assist them. Noland comes up with the idea of having them film an operation on Senator Farnstock (Jack Albertson) with Campanelli performing the surgery. However, once the cameras are on Campanelli experiences stage fright resulting in Noland being required to narrate the film. As a result, he receives all the fame for the operation that Campanelli actually performed.
11	11	"Witchcraft, Washington Style"	Oscar Rudolph	Seaman Jacobs & Fred S. Fox	November 28, 1972
Two new patients have been admitted to the hospital. One of them, Nickerson (Milton Frome), is a hypochondriac who wants an operation on his arm although there is nothing wrong with him. The other, George Smathers (Alan Oppenheimer), needs an appendicitis operation but refuses to have it because he believes a curse was put upon him by his ex-wife. To remove the curse, Noland performs a witchcraft ritual on Smathers – unaware that a horrified Nickerson has been moved to a bed in the same room.
12	12	"The Spy"	Charles Rondeau	Bill Davenport & Charles Tannen	December 5, 1972
Noland notices that Mr. Alexander (David White), a hospital patient, has been using a tape recorder to make negative comments about the hospital’s staff. Thus he suspects that Alexander may have been planted as a spy by Mr. Duncan (Parley Baer), a member of the board of trustees. This leads to a bitter argument between Duncan and Campanelli. However, it is eventually revealed that Alexander is merely gathering material for a novel he is writing. Noland then must set things right with the aid of Norman (Larry Storch), an orderly with a talent for voice impersonations.
13	13	"The New Head Nurse"	Charles Rondeau	Seaman Jacobs & Fred S. Fox	December 12, 1972
Noland has a plan to get rid of the grumpy new head nurse.
14	14	"Rx – Christmas"	Oscar Rudolph	Sheldon Keller	December 19, 1972
At Christmas time stand-up comic Tip Henry (Pat Harrington) is grateful for the care he has received at Capitol General. Therefore, he agrees to perform a benefit performance to raise money for the hospital children's ward. However a scheduling conflict makes him unable to do the show, thus leaving Dr. Noland and Nurses Carlisle, MacInerny, and Turner to put on a show themselves. Dr. Patterson (Herb Edelman) hears about the show and wants to join in despite his lack of talent. (Stephanie Edwards appears in this episode as a newspaper reporter.)
15	15	"Scalpel, Sponge, Typewriter"	Oscar Rudolph	Joseph Bonaduce	January 2, 1973
At Dr. Noland’s suggestion – and with Dr. Campanelli's reluctant approval – doofus orderly Harold Lefkowitz (Bernie Kopell) starts a hospital newsletter. For inspiration, he consults one of the hospital’s patients, crack news reporter James Jerome (James Gregory), who tells Harold to make his stories enticing. However, Harold goes too far and turns out a newsletter filled with outlandish and scandalous stories that outrages many of hospital's staff and patients. It then becomes up to Noland to straighten out the mess and have Harold retract his stories. (Richard X. Slattery appears as one of the hospital's doctors.)
16	16	"Black Is Beautiful"	Oscar Rudolph	Arthur Julian	January 9, 1973
No more clowning for Noland, who's trying to impress a beautiful nurse (Tracy Reed). Tom Bosley appears as one of the patients.
17	17	"How to Cure a Doctor of Money"	Herb Wallerstein	John L. Greene & Arthur Phillips	January 16, 1973
Noland tries to keep a promising intern from returning to a lucrative career as a quarterback.
18	18	"Interrupted Malady"	Charles Rondeau	Joseph Bonaduce	January 30, 1973
Noland is out to get a cardsharp patient who fleeced an orderly.
19	19	"Diagnosis, Who Knows?"	Oscar Rudolph	John L. Greene & Arthur Phillips	February 6, 1973
Tom Ewell as a strange old man whose symptoms have the doctors perplexed.
20	20	"Panic in the Sheets"	Oscar Rudolph	Lloyd Turner & Gordon Mitchell	February 13, 1973
Hospital hanky-panky: there's a newlywed couple in the VIP suite.
21	21	"Rx – Nose Job"	Herb Wallerstein	Sheldon Keller	February 20, 1973
Medical commercials are Noland's latest scheme to raise money for a nurse in need of a nose job.
22	22	"My Doctor, the Patient"	Ernest Losso	Myles Wilder & William Raynor	February 27, 1973
Bookmaking in the hospital: a scheme to finance the boss's dream of wheelchair ramps.
23	23	"Creepy, Peepy"	Herbert Kenwith	Erik Tarloff	March 6, 1973
Mummies and malpractice suits disrupt the hospital when an ailing horror-film star visits.
24	24	"It Don't Mean a Ping, If You Ain't Got That Pong"	Herb Wallerstein	Arthur Phillips, John L. Greene	March 13, 1973
A Chinese table-tennis player falls for Ellen and decides to defect.
25	25	"Super Doc"	Oscar Rudolph	Betty Bonaduce & Joseph Bonaduce	March 20, 1973
Edmond O'Brien plays Campanelli's aging and revered teacher.
26	26	"Gorilla My Dreams"	Oscar Rudolph	Betty Bonaduce & Joseph Bonaduce	March 27, 1973
Hospital monkey business concerning a lonely gorilla and her injured keeper (Bernard Fox).

=== Season 2 (original run): The New Temperatures Rising Show (1973–74) ===
Starring Paul Lynde as Dr. Paul Mercy, Sudie Bond as Martha Mercy, Barbara Cason as Miss Tillis, Jennifer Darling as Nurse Windy Winchester, John Dehner as Dr. Charles Cleveland Claver, Jeff Morrow as Dr. Lloyd Axton, and Cleavon Little as Dr. Jerry Noland. Jerry Houser has a recurring role as an intern named Haskell.

The New Temperatures Rising Show was pre-empted on October 23, 1973, by the TV-movie The President's Plane is Missing, and on November 27, 1973, by The World Turned Upside Down. The broadcast of January 1, 1974, was a rerun of "The Mothers", the sixth episode of the season. On January 15, 1974, The New Temperatures Rising Show was replaced in its Tuesday time-slot by a new series, Happy Days.

No. overall	No. in season	Title	Directed by	Written by	Original release date
27	1	"The Misguided Appendectomy"	Allen Baron	Betty Bonaduce & Joseph Bonaduce	September 25, 1973
The hospital is the hiding place for two fugitives, a thief and a cowardly patient.
28	2	"The Oldest Living American"	Roger Duchowny	Art Baer & Ben Joelson	October 2, 1973
Mercy learns from Claver that Luke Shaw (Patrick Cranshaw), a 125-year-old man and the last survivor of the American Civil War, has been admitted into the hospital for observation. Mercy seeks glory for himself by exploiting Shaw with press conferences and publicity photographs but then learns that Shaw has died of cardio vascular failure. However, Mercy plans to continue with his scheme when Luke Shaw, Jr. (also Patrick Cranshaw) is admitted into the hospital.
29	3	"The Strike"	Allen Baron	Art Baer & Ben Joelson	October 9, 1973
All the doctors, nurses, and orderlies are threatening to go on strike unless they get a raise in pay. Dr. Mercy, however, is under pressure from his mother to refrain from giving in to their threats. However, as the staff begins to walk off the job Mercy finds the pressure and chaos overwhelming. He reaches a breaking point when he is forced to assist Dr. Noland and Nurse Winchester in surgery.
30	4	"A Classic Case"	Roger Duchowny	E. Duke Vincent & Al Gordon & Hal Goldman & Bruce Johnson	October 16, 1973
Intern Haskell diagnoses an injured patient as suffering from a fracture of the cervical spine and orders him to be put into traction. When Noland takes a look at patient's x-ray he realized that Haskell misdiagnosed a natural curvature of the spine as a facture. When Mercy finds out about it he realizes that the hospital may be sued for malpractice. Add to that is his nagging mother complaining about the noisy patient in the room next to hers.
31	5	"We Ain't Got No Body"	Roger Duchowny	Bruce Shelly & David Ketchum	October 30, 1973
Nolan, Winchester, and Haskell create "Bertram Dolby", a mythical patient, then claim that he died and blame his death on the lack of cardiac crash carts on all the floors of the hospital. Their ploy to convince Mercy to purchase the new hardware goes off as planned until an autopsy is ordered on the fictional corpse. In addition to this dilemma, the hospital's heating system has broken down and the repairman (Jesse White) is charging Mercy an outlandish fee.
32	6	"The Mothers"	Allen Baron	Art Baer & Ben Joelson	November 6, 1973
Noland's nosy mother (Isabel Sanford) persuades Mercy's mother not to move out and retire to the country.
33	7	"Gonna Getcha"	Allen Baron	Art Baer & Ben Joelson	November 13, 1973
Someone is sending a nervous Mercy death threats.
34	8	"The Night Shift"	Roger Duchowny	Art Baer & Ben Joelson	November 20, 1973
Mercy and Noland are working the night shift at the hospital and have to deal with an appendectomy patient (Ronnie Schell) who thinks he is dying. When the patient climbs out onto a ledge and threatens to jump (although he's only on the second floor), Nolan, Mercy, Tillis, and Winchester each make an attempt to bring him in. However, he demands to see Dr. Claver, who has gone to his nephew's wedding. Claver eventually returns in a state of intoxication and yet insists on performing the appendectomy operation.
35	9	"Mercy the Surgeon"	Allen Baron	Lloyd Garver & Ken Hecht	December 4, 1973
Mercy has to carve up or shut up after he boasts of his prowess with a scalpel.
36	10	"The Physical"	Roger Duchowny	Hal Goldman & Al Gordon	December 11, 1973
A physical leaves Mercy singing the VD blues.
37	11	"The Donation"	Roger Duchowny	Ken Hecht & Lloyd Garver	December 18, 1973
A philanthropist threatens to cut off funds if his aged father donates his body to science.
38	12	"Four of a Kind"	William Asher	Arthur Marx & Robert Fisher	December 25, 1973
Mercy plans to reap a public-relations windfall from the birth of quadruplets.
39	13	"Operation Mercy"	William Asher	Michael Morris	January 8, 1974
Mercy cowers at the thought of undergoing minor throat surgery.

=== Season 2 (summer replacement): Temperatures Rising (1974) ===
Starring Paul Lynde as Dr. Paul Mercy, Alice Ghostley as Nurse Edwina Moffitt, Nancy Fox as Nurse Ellen Turner, Barbara Rucker as Nurse Kelly, and Cleavon Little as Dr. Jerry Noland.

No. overall	No. in season	Title	Directed by	Written by	Original release date
40	1	"Big Brother"	Richard Kinon	Ed Jurist	July 18, 1974
The staff revolts when Mercy installs a surveillance system.
41	2	"Is There a Lady Doctor in the House?"	Herbert Kenwith	Bill Davenport & Lou Derman	July 25, 1974
Noland and Mercy scheme to get rid of an overbearing doctor (Corinne Camacho).
42	3	"Kid Genius"	Herbert Kenwith	Bill Davenport & Lou Derman	August 1, 1974
A temperamental classical pianist – who's 10 years old – terrorizes the hospital staff.
43	4	"Three Faces of Edwina"	Herbert Kenwith	Joseph Bonaduce & Johnny Bonaduce	August 8, 1974
Edwina considers cosmetic surgery and Mercy is pursued by a wealthy widow (Anne Meara).
44	5	"Healer Man"	Herbert Kenwith	Arthur Marx & Robert Fisher	August 15, 1974
Mercy rescues country and western superstar Billy Joe Tyler (Dick Gautier) from a motorcycle accident and, in appreciation, Billy Joe writes and records a new hit song called "Healer Man". The publicity from the song earns Mercy not only fame but also the wrath of Mr. Rockwell (John Fiedler), a member of the board of trustees, who accuses Mercy of using the hospital for his own personal glory. It now becomes up to Dr. Noland to straighten things out.
45	6	"Shafted"	Roger Duchowny	Bruce Shelly & David Ketchum	August 22, 1974
Noland gets trapped in an elevator and Mercy tumbles down a shaft just as an efficiency expert (Parley Baer) arrives to rate the hospital.
46	7	"Mercy Beaucoup"	Richard Learman	Arthur Phillips & John L. Greene	August 29, 1974
Mercy misinterprets the staff's efforts to help further his career.
