= 'Twas the Night Before Christmas (1977 TV special) =

- Written by: Dick Clair; Jenna McMahon
- Directed by: Tim Kiley
- Starring: Paul Lynde; Anne Meara; Martha Raye; Alice Ghostley
- Music by: Velton Ray Bunch
- Country of origin: United States
- Original language: English

Production
- Producers: Joe Layton; Ken Welch; Mitzi Welsh
- Running time: 60 minutes

Original release
- Network: ABC
- Release: December 7, 1977

'Twas the Night Before Christmas is a Christmas television special loosely inspired by the 1823 poem "A Visit from St. Nicholas" by Clement Clarke Moore. It first aired December 7, 1977 on ABC. Directed by Tim Kiley, it stars Paul Lynde, Anne Meara, Martha Raye, and Alice Ghostley.

== Plot ==
The story begins with a disclaimer: "This is not the way the famous poem came about... or perhaps it is."

On Christmas Eve in a New England town in the late 1890s, the Cosgrove family's home is in an uproar over the holidays. The patriarch, Clark Cosgrove (Paul Lynde) is frazzled by the gift demands of his loud children. His wife Nellie (Anne Meara) runs into endless friction with Clark's formidable mother (Alice Ghostley), who lives with them. Nellie's inebriated father (Foster Brooks) and cat-loving mother (Martha Raye) arrive for the holiday, and tensions arise between the mothers-in-law. A German uncle (Howard Morris) is also arriving, but complications ensue when a traveling salesman (George Gobel) is mistaken for the uncle. Adding to the tumult is a visit from a caroling neighbor (Anson Williams). During the night, Clark's mother-in-law's cat escapes from the house and winds up on the roof. Clark goes to retrieve the cat and creates a ruckus, waking the house.

Most of the children are angry and convinced that Clark and Nellie had given them disappointing gifts, which pushes Clark to the point of nearly telling them all that Santa is fake. The youngest daughter is thrilled and hugs Clark, believing "Santa IS real!" Not wanting to crush her spirit, Clark, off the top of his head, improvises a poem to explain the ruckus, what turns out to be the famous "A Visit from St. Nicholas." As the now-satisfied children and the rest of the family head to bed, Nellie approaches Clark and reminds him that Christmas celebrates "the birthday of a miracle worker." They share an intimate moment, which is interrupted by the real Santa Claus arriving and reenacting the poem Clark had just made up.

== Cast ==
- Paul Lynde as Clark Cosgrove
- Anne Meara as Nellie, Clark's wife
- Alice Ghostley as Clark's mother
- Foster Brooks as Nellie's father
- Martha Raye as Nellie's mother
- Howard Morris as German uncle
- George Gobel as Traveling salesman
- Anson Williams as Caroling Neighbor

== Production ==
'Twas the Night Before Christmas was part of a series of American Broadcasting Company (ABC) television specials starring Paul Lynde to fulfill a contract with him after previous efforts to establish a star vehicle for him, The Paul Lynde Show and The New Temperatures Rising Show, had flopped in the ratings. Whereas previous offerings, most notably the 1976 production of The Paul Lynde Halloween Special, relied on a sketch comedy revue format, 'Twas the Night Before Christmas retained a narrative format where Lynde and his castmates remained in character for the entire show. Lynde's casting as a relatively straight, dramatic lead fulfilled a longstanding wish of his for more serious roles.

Lynde was responsible for casting Martha Raye as his mother-in-law, telling an interviewer: "It's my chance to repay her for all the times she used me in her NBC Comedy Hour back in the 1950s."

George Gobel had previously voiced a character in an animated holiday special of the same name three years prior. The two specials were otherwise unrelated.

For the climactic recitation of A Visit from St. Nicholas, Lynde was not allowed to rely on cue cards because director Tim Kiley felt they would distract the child actors in the cast. Lynde would later recall: "I had to do the poem five different times for five different camera angles. If America thinks I did this with cue cards, I'll kill myself."

== Broadcast ==
'Twas the Night Before Christmas was broadcast by ABC on December 7, 1977. Reviews were not favorable, with The New York Times dismissing its plot as "anemic" and adding its "conceptual hugger-mugger was fatal." Variety complained that "an inept script and a subpar performance by Paul Lynde worked against the best efforts of a charming cast in this ABC yuletide special." Film Threat wrote in 2006: "it remains as flat and faded as a faded Christmas card. (...) it just reminds us that life sucks and people are stupid, and who wants to turn on the TV to be reminded of that?" The broadcast ranked 30th for that week's Nielsen ratings. However, it later received an Award of Excellence from the Film Advisory Board.

'Twas the Night Before Christmas was never rebroadcast by ABC or any other U.S. television network. To date, it has not been made commercially available on DVD and, except for bootleg recordings and a one-time screening at a New York City retro film and television festival in 2001, it had not been seen since its only telecast as of 2006.

== See also ==
- List of Christmas films
