= Stanley (1956 TV series) =

American sitcom

- Genre: Situation comedy
- Starring: Buddy Hackett; Carol Burnett; Paul Lynde
- No. of series: 1
- No. of episodes: 19

Production
- Running time: 30 minutes

Original release
- Network: NBC
- Release: September 24, 1956 – March 11, 1957

Stanley is an American sitcom starring Buddy Hackett, Carol Burnett, and the voice of Paul Lynde. It aired on NBC-TV from September 24, 1956, to March 11, 1957, during the 1956–1957 television season. It was produced by Max Liebman, who previously produced Sid Caesar's Your Show of Shows, co-sponsored by American Tobacco (Pall Mall cigarettes) and The Toni Company (Bobbi Home Permanent, Pamper Shampoo).

== Plot summary ==
Stanley revolved around the adventures of the namesake character (Hackett) as the operator of a newsstand in a posh hotel in New York City, the Sussex-Fenton. Burnett played his girlfriend Celia, and Lynde voiced the unseen hotel owner Mr. Fenton, who never appeared on camera but frequently could be heard giving orders to his staff.

In the show's introduction, the following line was recited: "You think you've got troubles. Stanley, he's got troubles!"

== Broadcast history ==
As was the case with several such programs (but a declining number, even at this early stage of network television), Stanley was aired live. The complete run of the series, preserved on kinescope film, is known to exist and the show is available via streaming and has been released on DVD. The program aired on Monday nights at 8:30 pm EST opposite the popular Arthur Godfrey's Talent Scouts on CBS and the long-running The Voice of Firestone on ABC. After 19 weeks of low ratings, Stanley was canceled mid-season and replaced by Tales of Wells Fargo, a western which ran on NBC for the next five and a half years.

== Episodes ==
No.	Title	Original release date
1	"Opera Tickets"	September 24, 1956
2	"Folk Song Festival"	October 1, 1956
3	"Army Buddies"	October 8, 1956
4	"Stanley Gets Jealous"	October 22, 1956
5	"Clothing Store"	October 29, 1956
6	"Stanley Gets a Bachelor Apartment"	November 5, 1956
7	"Stanley and the Blonde Bandit"	November 19, 1956
8	"The New Stanley"	November 26, 1956
9	"Celia's Pen Pal"	December 3, 1956
10	"Stanley's a Lawyer"	December 17, 1956
11	"Christmas Show"	December 24, 1956
12	"The New Year's Party"	December 31, 1956
13	"The Celebrity"	January 14, 1957
14	"Stanley and Mr. Phillips' Plot"	January 21, 1957
15	"Married Friends"	January 28, 1957
16	"The Fight"	February 11, 1957
17	"Work Follies"	February 18, 1957
18	"Stanley's Surprise Party"	February 24, 1957
19	"The Break Up"	March 11, 1957

== Home media ==
In the early 2010s, the full 19 episode series was digitally re-mastered and released on a 3-disc DVD set by Stanley Productions, LLC. It is currently also available for download and streaming via Amazon.

== Cast ==
- Buddy Hackett as Stanley Peck
- Carol Burnett as Celia
- Paul Lynde as Horace Fenton (voice only)
- Reedy Talton as Marvin
- Frederic Tozere as Mr. Phillips
- Jane Connell as Jane

On February 16, 1964, Hackett and Burnett were reunited on CBS-TV's What's My Line? A blind-folded Hackett recognized his former co-star's voice who appeared as that evening's mystery guest. After briefly discussing their short-lived roles on Stanley, Buddy exclaimed "That's the one the Nielsen guy threw off the air for us!" This was a reference to the show's first guest that evening who signed in as "Mr. X". He was actually A.C. Nielsen Jr. who headed Nielsen Media Research.
