= Adia Millett =

American artist (born 1975)

- Born: 1975 (age 50–51); Pasadena, California, U.S.
- Education: California Institute of the Arts; University of California, Berkeley
- Known for: Multimedia
- Father: Cleavon Little

Adia Millett Little (born 1975) is a contemporary American multi-media artist whose work can be found in various forums throughout the United States and abroad. Through multiple mediums, including dioramas, quilting, painting, stitching, woodworking, and multi-media works, Millett creates her art to discover transitions and tell stories.

== Biography ==
Millett was born in 1975 in Pasadena, California. She was raised by her mother in South Central Los Angeles. Her mother first studied art, but later studied chemistry and earned a doctoral degree in psychology.

Her father was the actor Cleavon Little. Millett's step-father, who married her mother when Adia was seven, was an architect and very supportive of her artistic endeavors.

== Career ==
After completing an undergraduate program and receiving a Bachelor of Fine Arts from the University of California at Berkeley in 1997, Millett continued her education at the California Institute of the Arts, graduating in 2000 with a Master of Fine Arts. In 2001, Millett was chosen to participate in the Whitney Museum's Independent Studies Program. In 2002, Millett participated in the Studio Museum in Harlem residency program, and in 2003 became the resident visiting artist at Columbia College in Chicago, Il. Millett has taught at Columbia College in Chicago, UC Santa Cruz, and Cooper Union in NY as an artist in residence. She currently teaches at California College of the Arts.

== Major projects ==
=== Inventing Truth (2001–2002) ===
A set of embroidery based artworks, this project addresses loss, memory, and the significance of everyday objects. The seven, small, framed, cross-stitched fabrics depict every day objects including a porkpie hat, a bottle of Popov vodka, a rifle, a rose, a package of Newport menthol cigarettes, a pair of underwear, and a twenty dollar bill. By presenting objects that are stereotypically associated with black men, Millett creates a juxtaposition within her work between the feminine "craft" of stitching and the masculine subject matter of the individual pieces.

=== Pre-fabricated Innocence (2004–2010) ===
Pre-Fabricated Innocence is an eight-part series of miniature houses that has been described as engaging with themes of voyeurism. Each miniature depicts interior scenes that have been interpreted as reflecting class and religious beliefs.Pre-fabricated Innocence: Anticipation (light bulbs) (2004), for instance, measures 11 × 14 inches and includes a table with a single chair, a bouquet of flowers, a staircase leading to a closed door, and nine functional lightbulbs. Working lights, furniture, and other small details appear in many of Millett’s miniatures. The decorations within the houses have been described as intended to create a space for dialogue and character development.

=== The Fire Next Time (2016) ===
The Fire Next Time (2016) is a mixed-medium piece on wood panel that takes its title from James Baldwin's seminal 1963 book. The miniature is a tiny house surrounded by billowing smoke that stands against a golden backdrop. The small dwelling is made of faded blue vertical planks with a roof of dark wooden shingles that float into the golden sky as the abode burns. This piece presents a visualization of breaking apart.

=== Infinite Edges exhibition (2019) ===
One of Adia Millett's largest exhibitions to date is entitled "Infinite Edges," and was held from 14 September—9 November 2019 at Traywick Contemporary . This solo exhibition displays Millett's many practices which includes quilt-making, painting, drawing, photography, collage and sculpture. Millet uses these multi-media pieces to highlight the African American experiences while simultaneously speaking to how all living things are connected. Millett's geometric patters draw the viewer's eye from point to point, mimicking the multi-faceted, complex, and fragmented nature of life itself.

=== Quilts ===
Millett's quilts highlight interconnectivity, as the domestic or "craft" based activity connects pieces of cloth or textile to one another through stitches and string. These artistic quilts simultaneously combine multiple materials and specific cultural references, as the subject matter of each specifically relates to different cultural moments. Chosen Family, for example, is one of Millett's pieces from 2018 that combines fabric, textiles, feather, and hand quilting. The pattern of the fabric and textile contained within the piece allude to traditional African textiles, and thick rim of feathers around the circumference of the quilt create a soft border that highlights the multi-media nature of the piece.
