= Paul Lynde =

American comedian and actor (1926–1982)

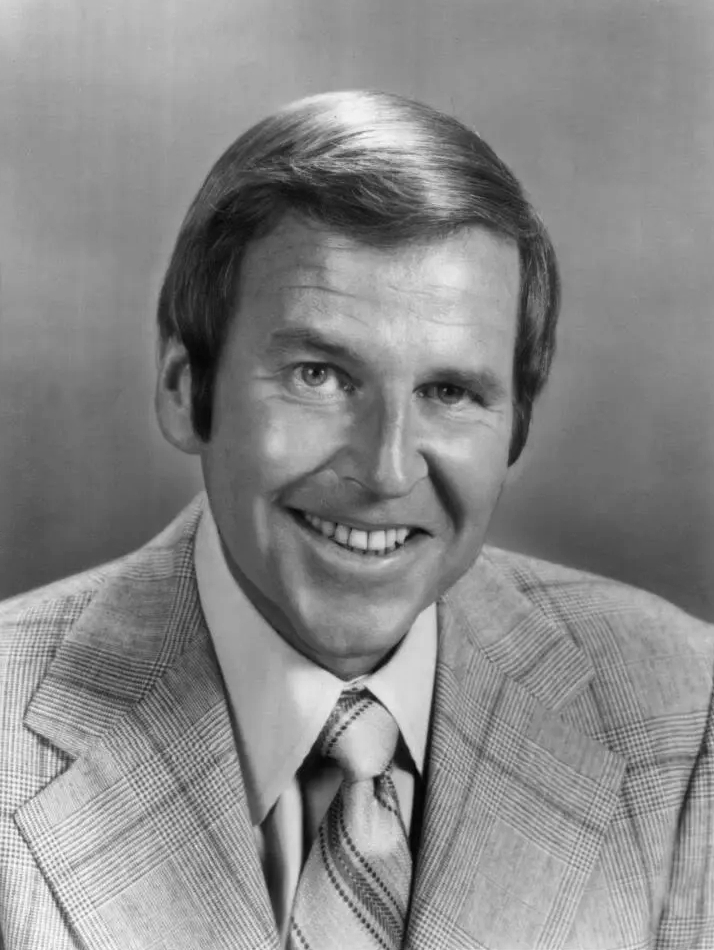
- Lynde in 1972
- Born: Paul Edward Lynde; June 13, 1926; Mount Vernon, Ohio, U.S.
- Died: January 10, 1982 (aged 55); Beverly Hills, California, U.S.
- Resting place: Amity Cemetery, Amity, Ohio, U.S.
- Education: Northwestern University
- Occupations: Comedian; actor; TV personality
- Years active: 1954–1982
- Notable work: Bewitched; Bye Bye Birdie; Hollywood Squares

Paul Edward Lynde (/lɪnd/; June 13, 1926 – January 10, 1982) was an American comedian, actor, and game-show panelist. A character actor with a distinctively campy and snarky persona who often poked fun at his closeted homosexuality, Lynde was well known for his roles as Uncle Arthur on Bewitched, as the befuddled father Harry MacAfee in Bye Bye Birdie, and as a regular "center square" panelist on the game show The Hollywood Squares from 1968 to 1981. He also voiced animated characters for five Hanna-Barbera productions.

Lynde regularly topped audience polls of most-liked TV stars and was routinely admired and recognized by his peers during his lifetime. Mel Brooks once described Lynde as being capable of getting laughs by reading "a phone book, tornado alert, or seed catalogue". Lynde once said that while he would rather be recognized as a serious actor, "we live in a world that needs laughter and I've decided if I can make people laugh, I'm making a more important contribution."

== Early life ==
Paul Lynde was born on June 13, 1926, in Mount Vernon, Ohio. His mother, Sylvia Bell Lynde (née Doup), and his father, Hoy Corydon Lynde, owned and operated a meat market. Fifth-born among six siblings, Lynde had older sisters, Grace and Helen, older brothers, Richard Hoy and Coradon ("Cordy") George and younger brother, John ("Johnny"). His favorite brother, Coradon, died in 1944 at the age of 21, while serving in the US Army during World War II. In 1949, his parents died within three months of each other.

Lynde graduated in 1944 from Mount Vernon High School, where he played the bass drum in the high school band. He then studied speech and drama at Northwestern University in Evanston, Illinois, where his classmates included Cloris Leachman, Charlotte Rae, Patricia Neal, Jeffrey Hunter, and Claude Akins. He was active in the school's theatrical productions, and joined the Upsilon chapter of the fraternity Phi Kappa Sigma. He is listed among its most famous members. He graduated in 1948.

== Career ==
After graduating from college, Lynde moved to New York City, taking odd jobs while looking for his show-business break. His first appearance as a comic was at the famed supper club Number One Fifth Avenue. He made his Broadway debut in the hit revue New Faces of 1952 in which he co-starred with fellow newcomers Eartha Kitt, Robert Clary, Alice Ghostley, and Carol Lawrence. In his monologue from that revue, the "Trip of the Month Club", Lynde portrayed a man on crutches recounting his misadventures on the African safari trip he took with his late wife. The show was filmed and released as New Faces in 1954.

After the revue's run, Lynde co-starred in the short-lived 1956 sitcom Stanley opposite Buddy Hackett and Carol Burnett, both of whom were also starting their careers in show business. That year, he guest-starred on NBC's sitcom The Martha Raye Show.

Lynde returned to Broadway in 1960, when he was cast as Harry MacAfee, the father in Bye Bye Birdie. He also played the role in the 1963 film adaptation. That year, he recorded a live album, Recently Released, issued as an LP. He wrote all six tracks. Once he could afford writers, he rarely used his own material until his tenure on The Hollywood Squares years later.

Lynde was in great demand in the 1960s. During the 1961–62 television season, he was a regular on NBC's The Perry Como Show as part of the Kraft Music Hall players with Don Adams, Kaye Ballard, and Sandy Stewart. He was a familiar face on many sitcoms, including The Phil Silvers Show, The Farmer's Daughter, The Patty Duke Show, The Munsters, The Flying Nun, Gidget, I Dream of Jeannie, and F Troop, and on variety shows such as The Ed Sullivan Show and The Dean Martin Show. He also was featured in several 1960s films, including Send Me No Flowers and The Glass Bottom Boat, both starring Doris Day.

=== Bewitched ===
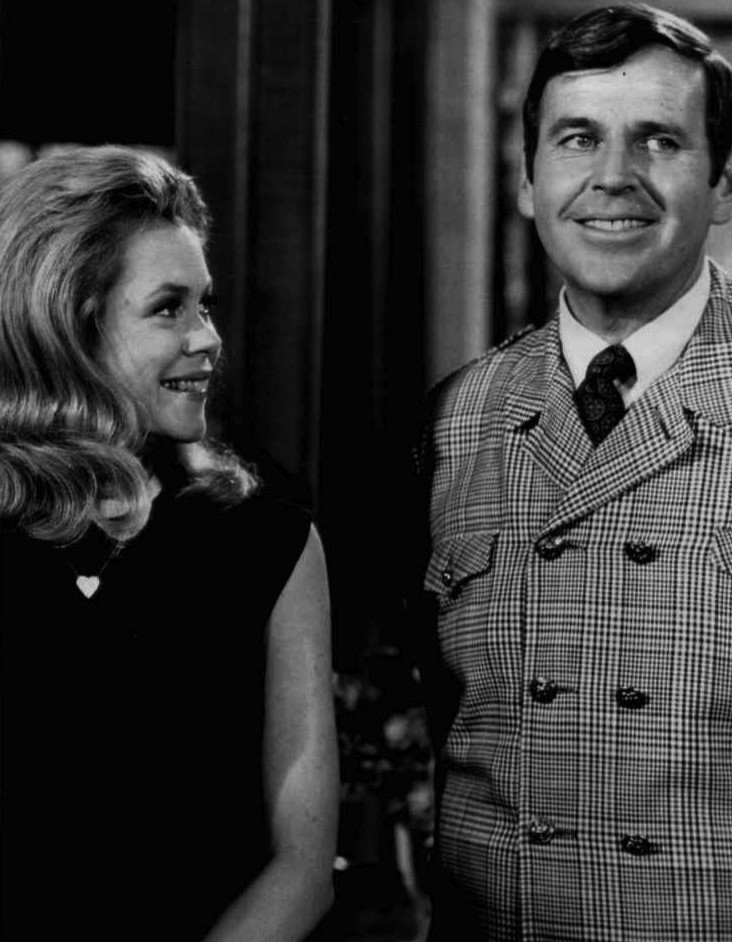
Lynde as Uncle Arthur with Elizabeth Montgomery in the 1968 Bewitched episode "The No Harm Charm"

In 1965, Lynde made his debut appearance on Bewitched during the first-season episode "Driving is the Only Way to Fly" (air date March 25, 1965). His role as mortal Harold Harold, Samantha Stephens' nervous driving instructor, was well received by viewers. Lynde also impressed series star Elizabeth Montgomery and her husband, director/producer William Asher, who created a recurring role for Lynde as Endora's practical-joking brother Uncle Arthur. Lynde made 10 appearances on Bewitched as the beloved character, the first being "The Joker is a Card" (air date October 14, 1965). His final appearance in the sitcom was in "The House That Uncle Arthur Built" (February 11, 1971) in the series' seventh season. Paul Lynde, Elizabeth Montgomery, and William Asher became good friends and were regularly seen together off the set.

=== Television pilots ===
Lynde starred in four failed television pilots in the 1960s:

- Howie (1962, CBS)
- Two's Company (1965, ABC)
- Sedgewick Hawk-Styles: Prince of Danger (1966, ABC)
- Manley and the Mob (1967, ABC)

Of the four shows, only the Victorian detective spoof Sedgewick Hawk-Styles: Prince of Danger was initially picked up by ABC, only to be canceled at the last minute. William Asher commented in the A&E Biography episode on Lynde that ABC had reservations about Lynde, most notably his increasingly erratic offscreen behavior and the persistent rumors of his homosexuality.

=== The Hollywood Squares ===
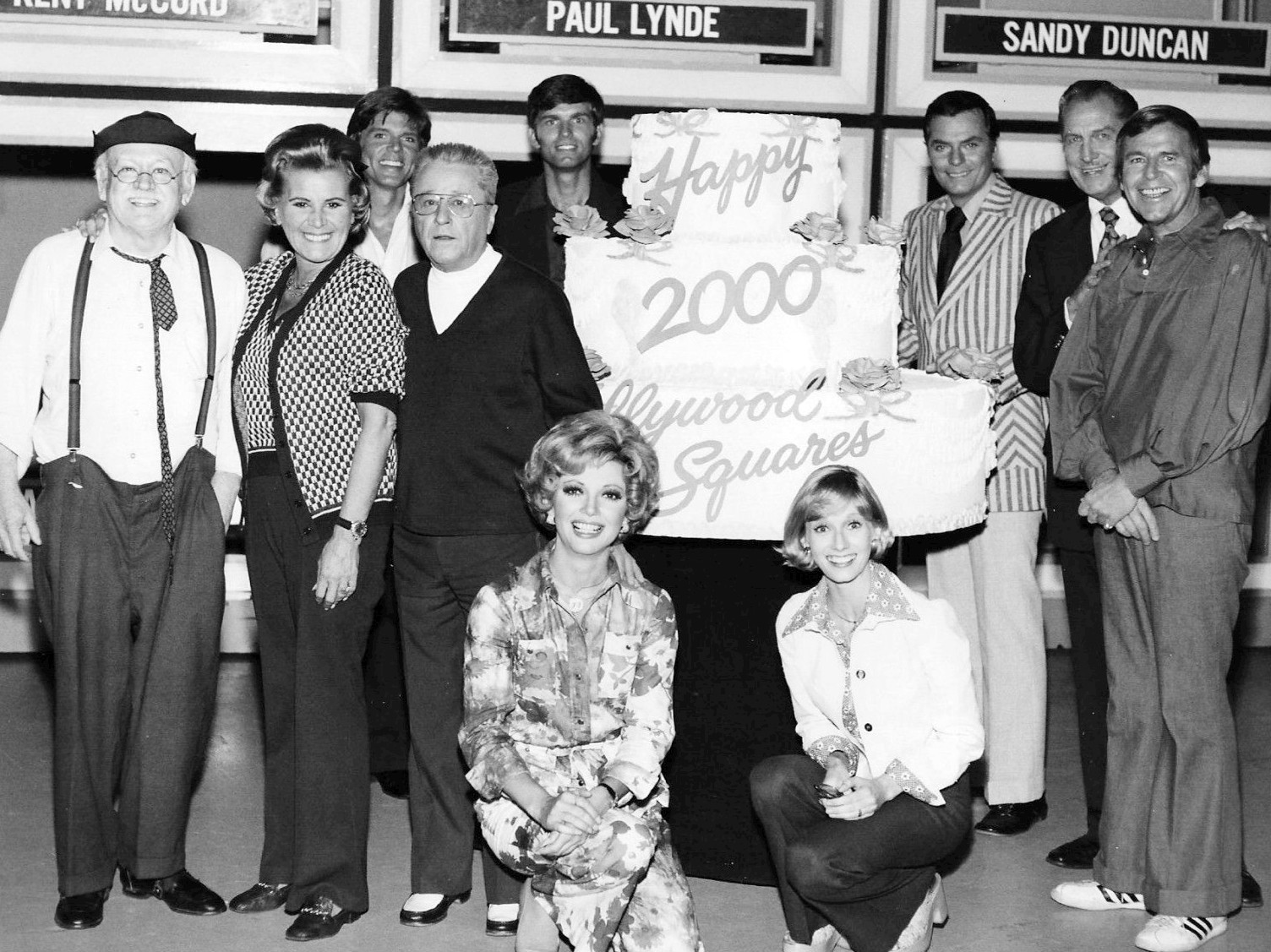
Photo from the television game show Hollywood Squares to celebrate the 2,000th episode in 1974. Pictured are Cliff Arquette as Charley Weaver, Rose Marie, John Davidson, George Gobel, Kent McCord, Peter Marshall, Vincent Price, Lynde; Ruta Lee and Sandy Duncan, foreground.

Q: "Why do motorcyclists wear leather?"

Lynde: "Because chiffon wrinkles." (the first Hollywood Squares zinger)

Q: "You're the world's most popular fruit. What are you?"

Lynde: "Humble."

Q: "How many men on a hockey team?"

Lynde: "About half."

Q: "Who's generally better looking, a fairy or a pixie?"

Lynde: "Looks aren't everything! (pause) I'll go for the fairy."

Q: "Is it against the law in Texas to call a Marine a 'sissy'?"

Lynde: "I guess I'll have to take the law into my own hands."

Q: "What unusual thing do you do if you have something called 'the gift of tongues'?"

Lynde: "I wouldn't tell the grand jury. Why should I tell you?"

Q: "The great writer George Bernard Shaw once wrote, 'It's such a wonderful thing, what a crime to waste it on children.' What is it?"

Lynde: "A whipping."

Q: "...when a man falls out of your boat and into the water, you should yell 'Man overboard!' Now, what should you yell if a woman falls overboard?"

Lynde: "Full speed ahead!"

Q: "The Tin Man wanted a heart and the Lion wanted courage. What did the Straw Man want?"

Lynde: "He wanted the Tin Man to notice him."

Q: "At what famous place in America will you find couples strolling arm-in-arm along Flirtation Walk and smooching at a place called Kissing Rock?"

Lynde: "Oh, Leavenworth prison."

Q: "In what state was Abraham Lincoln born?"

Lynde: "Well, like all of us; naked and screaming!"

Q: "The worst time for sex is right after what?"

Lynde: "Surgery."

Q: "Is it difficult to train an ostrich to become a sheepdog?"

Lynde: "Yes it is; they can't lift their leg without tippin' over."

Q: "What is the major cause of itching in old folks?"

Lynde: "Oh, Eating shredded wheat in bed."

Q: "Why was Daniel thrown into the den of lions?"

Lynde: "For jaywalking in Jerusalem."

Q: "In ancient times it was illegal to park your chariot in certain places in the biblical city of Nineveh. What was the penalty if you did so?"

Lynde: "They'd let the air out of your horse!"

Q: "Who determines the sex of a child?"

Lynde: "I say let the child make up its own mind!"

Q: "According to the Bible, King David was not allowed to build a temple because he sinned; what was Moses not allowed to do because of his sin?"

Lynde: "Build a shopping center near the temple."

Q: "What do we call a gelded rooster?"

Lynde: "Is that the one that just goes "a-doodle-doo"?"

Q: "Paul, true or false...Your teeth are about the same size and shape as a pig's."

Lynde: "Look who's talking, beaver face!"

— Paul Lynde (Zingers (jokes) from The Hollywood Squares)

In 1966, Lynde debuted on the fledgling game show The Hollywood Squares and quickly became its iconic guest star. Eventually, he assumed a permanent spot as the "center square", a move that ensured that he would be called upon by contestants at least once in almost every round. Despite an urban legend claiming Lynde's contract guaranteed him the center square, he remained in the center at the producers' discretion. On The Hollywood Squares, Lynde was best able to showcase his comedic talents with short, salty one-liners, spoken in his signature snickering delivery. Many gags were thinly veiled allusions to his homosexuality. Other jokes relied on double entendre or an alleged fondness for deviant behaviors, or dealt with touchy subject matter for 1970s television.

Appearing in 1,083 episodes, Lynde garnered considerable fame and wealth from the series. He eventually became disenchanted with being what he called "boxed in" to The Hollywood Squares and he departed the series in 1979. In 1980, The Hollywood Squares experienced a downward trend in Nielsen ratings and Lynde was approached about returning to the program. He initially declined, but changed his mind when told he would receive co-star billing with host Peter Marshall. He returned to the series in the spring of 1980, and remained with the show until its cancellation in February 1981.

=== Voice acting ===
Between 1969 and 1974, Lynde did extensive voice work on animated cartoons, particularly for Hanna-Barbera Productions. His most notable roles include:

- Templeton, the gluttonous rat in the 1973 animated feature Charlotte's Web
- Mildew Wolf, from It's the Wolf! (a segment of Cattanooga Cats)
- Claude Pertwee, neighbor on Where's Huddles?
- Sylvester Sneekly ("Hooded Claw") in The Perils of Penelope Pitstop

Lynde's sardonic inflections added a dimension to such lines as the sly, drawn-out whine, "What's in it for meeee?" His distinctive voice remains popular among impressionists. Although it is sometimes assumed that actress Alice Ghostley based her speech patterns and mannerisms on Lynde's, according to actress Kaye Ballard, "It was Paul who was influenced by Alice."

=== The Paul Lynde Show and Temperatures Rising ===
In 1972, Lynde starred in a short-lived ABC sitcom, The Paul Lynde Show. The series was a contractual fulfillment to ABC in place of an aborted ninth season of Bewitched.

Lynde starred as Paul Simms, an uptight attorney, and father who was at odds with his liberal-minded son-in-law. The family included wife Martha (Elizabeth Allen), daughters Sally (Pamelyn Ferdin) and Barbara (Jane Actman), Barbara's husband Howie (John Calvin) and Howie's parents (Jerry Stiller and Anne Meara).

Critics considered the show to be derivative of All in the Family, television's then most-popular primetime program, although many admitted the writing was excellent and that the sexual innuendoes gave it an extra note of spice. Lynde was nominated for a Best Actor Golden Globe for the show. Scheduled opposite the first half of the top-30 hit The Carol Burnett Show on CBS and the top-20 hit Adam-12 on NBC, the series garnered low ratings and was canceled after one season.

Contemporaneous media reports showed that viewers liked Lynde, but not The Paul Lynde Show and liked another ABC show, Temperatures Rising, but disliked co-star James Whitmore. Unhappy himself, Whitmore left the show and ABC moved Lynde to Temperatures Rising for the 1973–74 season. This move came despite the objections of William Asher, producer of both shows, who also quit in protest of ABC's meddling.

Ratings for The New Temperatures Rising were even lower than the previous season, in part because Asher's replacements shifted the show's tone to a much darker one than the previous season. ABC canceled the show and its time slot was taken by mid-season replacement Happy Days.

ABC later decided to resuscitate the program, with additional cast changes (most notably, Alice Ghostley, who replaced Sudie Bond in the role of Lynde's sister, Edwina). ABC also convinced Asher, who admitted Lynde's presence likely saved the series, to come back. Seven further episodes were produced for summer 1974 airings, after which the series was permanently canceled.

=== Summer stock theater ===
Lynde was a fixture on the Kenley Players summer stock theater circuit, appearing in Don't Drink the Water (1970, 1979), The Impossible Years (1969, 1978), Mother is Engaged (1974), My Daughter is Rated X (1973), Plaza Suite (1971), and Stop, Thief, Stop! (a retitled production of the play Three Goats and a Blanket, 1975). In all he appeared in nine Kenley Players productions, more than any other headliner. In the summer of 1980 Lynde toured the United States and Canada, headlining three one-act plays of "California Suite", "Plaza Suite", and "Last of the Red Hot Lovers", entitled 'Neil Simon's Suite', with cast members Beverly Sanders, friend and bodyguard Paul Barresi, and Kristie Siverson.

=== Television specials and variety shows ===
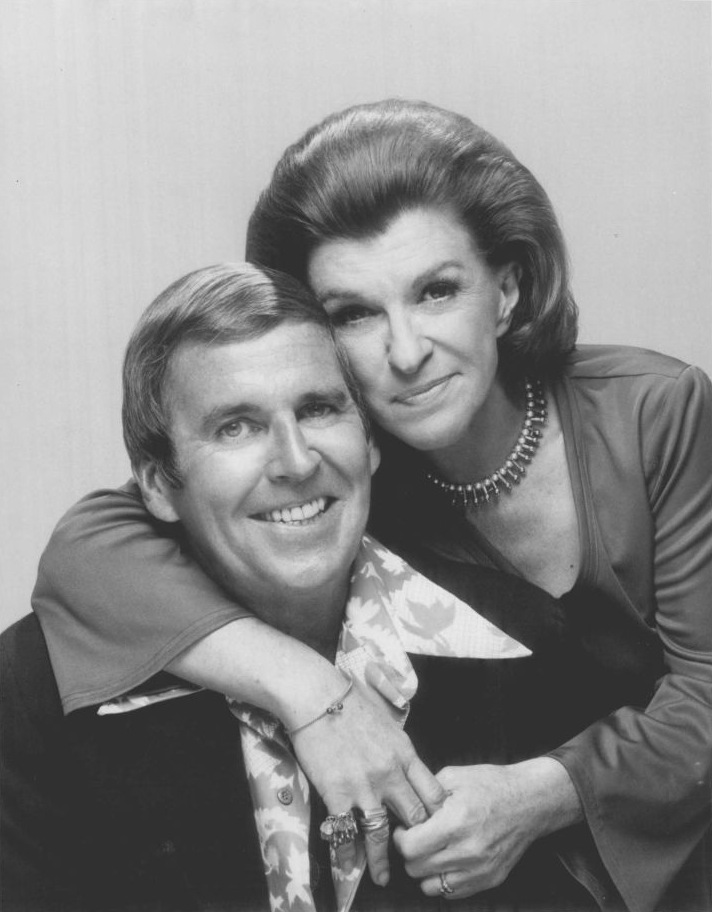
The Paul Lynde Comedy Hour (1975) with Nancy Walker

Lynde's continuing popularity led to his being signed by ABC to host a series of specials from 1975 to 1979, including:

- The Paul Lynde Comedy Hour (November 6, 1975) with Jack Albertson, Nancy Walker, and the Osmonds
- The Paul Lynde Halloween Special (October 29, 1976) featuring the first prime-time network appearance of Kiss, along with Margaret Hamilton recreating her role as the Wicked Witch of the West from The Wizard of Oz. Hamilton and Billie Hayes (as H. R. Pufnstuf's Witchiepoo) teamed up in a skit where they ask Lynde to help them improve their (witches) image. Other guests included Betty White, Donny and Marie Osmond, Tim Conway, and Roz Kelly
- The Paul Lynde Comedy Hour (April 23, 1977) with Cloris Leachman and Tony Randall
- 'Twas the Night Before Christmas (December 7, 1977) with Alice Ghostley, Martha Raye, George Gobel, and Foster Brooks
- The Paul Lynde Comedy Hour (May 20, 1978) with Juliet Prowse, Brenda Vaccaro, and Harry Morgan
- Paul Lynde at the Movies (March 24, 1979) with Betty White, Vicki Lawrence, Robert Urich, and Gary Coleman
- Paul Lynde Goes M-A-A-A-AD (May 20, 1979) with Marie Osmond, Charo, and Vicki Lawrence

Lynde was a regular guest on the variety show Donny & Marie between 1976 and 1978, until he lost his guest-starring role due to very public, drunken arguments with police officers.

=== Guest appearances and film roles ===
Acting jobs continued to be scarce for Lynde, although whether or not this was related to his alcoholism, which made him difficult to work with, is unclear. As demand for his services declined, he accepted a wider variety of job offers.

In 1978, he appeared as a guest weatherman for WSPD-TV in Toledo, Ohio, to publicize both The Hollywood Squares and a summer-stock performance.

In the 1979 comedy The Villain (released as Cactus Jack in the UK), he appeared as Indian chief Nervous Elk alongside former Bye Bye Birdie co-star Ann-Margret. It was his final film role.

In November 1980, the Beaux Arts Society, Inc. (founded in 1857) designated Paul Lynde "King" of the Beaux Arts Ball, with Kitty Carlisle designated as "Queen". Paul Lynde remained a life member of the Beaux Arts Society from 1980 until his death.

=== Awards ===
In 1976, at the Sixth Annual American Guild of Variety Artists (AGVA) "Entertainer of the Year Awards", Lynde received an award for being voted the funniest man of the year. Lynde immediately turned his award over to host Jackie Gleason, citing him as "the funniest man ever". The unexpected gesture shocked Gleason.

== Personal life ==
Despite his campy and flamboyant television persona, Lynde's private life and sexual orientation were not directly acknowledged or discussed on television or in other media during his lifetime. According to an essay on the website for The Biography Channel, in the 1970s, entertainment journalists did not investigate the private lives of performers who were best known as game-show regulars.

A 1976 People article on Lynde included text about Stan Finesmith, who was described as Lynde's hairstylist, "suite mate", and "chauffeur-bodyguard". The magazine included one photograph of Lynde as Finesmith styled his hair. During Lynde's lifetime, this was as close as the media came to hinting at his homosexuality. Cathy Rudolph, a friend of Lynde's who published a 2013 book Paul Lynde: A Biography – His Life, His Love(s) and His Laughter, stated in a 2018 interview that "being gay and having to hide it frustrated him."

With the wealth Lynde had earned working on Hollywood Squares, he bought Errol Flynn's Hollywood mansion and spent an enormous amount of money on renovations and décor. He lived there with his beloved dog, Harry MacAfee, until Harry died in 1977. Afterward, Lynde could not stay in the house without him and later bought a new home.

Lynde suffered from weight problems, weighing 250 lb (110 kg) when he graduated from high school. He was honored by Weight Watchers in 1977.

=== Struggles with alcohol ===
Lynde struggled with alcoholism and had numerous run-ins with the law, including frequent arrests for public intoxication. Peter Marshall and Kaye Ballard confirmed that Lynde, when inebriated, became very cruel, sometimes violent, and would sometimes ridicule his friends.

On July 18, 1965, Lynde was involved in an incident in which a friend, actor James "Bing" Davidson, accidentally fell to his death from the window of their hotel room in San Francisco's Sir Francis Drake Hotel. Lynde and 24-year-old Davidson had been drinking for hours when Davidson, while "horsing around", according to an Associated Press report, slipped and fell eight stories.

In October 1977, Lynde was involved in an incident at his alma mater, Northwestern University, when he was the grand marshal for homecoming. At a fast food restaurant near the campus after the homecoming parade, he made racist remarks and gestures to black NU professor James P. Pitts. Lynde blamed his behavior on fatigue and inebriation.

In January 1978, while in Salt Lake City to record a segment for the TV variety show Donny & Marie, Lynde was arrested outside a tavern and charged with interfering with a police officer. Lynde's vehicle had been broken into and his valuables stolen while he was inside the tavern. The arresting officer had been investigating a different car burglary and claimed Lynde kept insisting that he attend to Lynde's complaint instead. The complaint was later dropped.

Determined to get his life back on track, Lynde became sober and drug-free in early 1980.

== Death ==
On January 10, 1982, after Lynde failed to attend a birthday celebration, his friend, actor/model Paul Barresi, became concerned. When Barresi and another friend, actor Dean Dittman, could not get an answer after calling Lynde on the phone and knocking on Lynde's door, Barresi broke into the side entrance to Lynde's home in Beverly Hills, California, and found Lynde dead in his bed in the early morning hours of January 11, 1982. Lynde was 55 years old.

Stories circulated suggesting that Lynde had a visitor at the time of his death who fled the scene, but evidence indicated the stories were false. Lynde regularly activated his house alarm before retiring for the evening. When Barresi broke in, the alarm blared, indicating that Lynde had been alone at the time of his death and that he had died in his sleep. Contrary to other reports that Lynde was found naked, Barresi said, "Not so. Paul was in his pajamas and wearing a robe."

The coroner ruled the death was caused by a heart attack. Lynde's cremated remains are interred at Amity Cemetery, in Amity, Knox County, Ohio, next to those of his brother Johnny and his sister Helen. His mother, father, and veteran brother, Coradon, are buried at the same cemetery.

== Legacy ==
A biography was published in 2005, titled Center Square: The Paul Lynde Story. Authors Steve Wilson and Joe Florenski described Lynde as "Liberace without a piano" and that to most 1970s-era viewers, he was "a frustrated bit player and character actor on a daytime game show". To the homosexual community, his reputation was less than stellar: "In some ways, he came to symbolize what's perceived to be a self-loathing era for gay culture."

Lynde's distinctive vocal delivery has also been widely imitated:

- A 1995 episode of The Simpsons titled "Radioactive Man", features a supervillain with Lynde's characteristics called "The Scoutmaster" in a parody of the 1960s Batman television series.
- Cartoon creator/voice actor Seth MacFarlane has acknowledged that the voice of Roger the Alien on American Dad! was modeled after Lynde.
- Actor/comedian Michael Airington portrays Lynde in the show Oh My Goodness It's Paul Lynde and An Evening with Paul Lynde, recreating Lynde's 1976 live show and Off Center: The Paul Lynde Show. Airington licensed the rights from the Paul Lynde Estate following a copyright claim. He also sang the theme of Samurai Pizza Cats in an impersonated Paul Lynde voice.
- Steve Carell's portrayal of Uncle Arthur in the 2005 film version of Bewitched is done as an impression of Lynde.
- Veteran voice actor and Skywalker Sound editor David Acord used an impression of Lynde's distinctive speech pattern for the portrayal of the droid EV-A4-D in an episode of Star Wars: The Clone Wars.
- In 2018, drag queen BenDeLaCreme won the "Snatch Game" episode of the third season of RuPaul's Drag Race All Stars with a portrayal of Lynde.
- In July 2020, it was announced that actor and comedian Billy Eichner and producer Tom McNulty were developing a biopic based on the life of Lynde entitled Man in the Box, with Eichner set to star as Lynde.
- Richard Squires' 2018 experimental documentary Doozy examines Lynde's queer-coded voice work as a Hanna-Barbera cartoon villain.

== Filmography ==
=== Film ===
- New Faces (1954) (also writer) – Himself
- Son of Flubber (1963) – Sportscaster
- Bye Bye Birdie (1963) – Harry MacAfee
- Under the Yum Yum Tree (1963) – Murphy
- For Those Who Think Young (1964) – Sid Hoyt
- Send Me No Flowers (1964) – Mr. Atkins
- Beach Blanket Bingo (1965) – Bullets
- The Glass Bottom Boat (1966) – Homer Cripps
- Silent Treatment (1968) (documentary)
- How Sweet It Is! (1968) – The purser
- Charlotte's Web (1973) Templeton – (voice)
- Journey Back to Oz (1974) Pumpkinhead – (voice)
- Hugo the Hippo (1975) – Aban-Khan – (voice)
- Rabbit Test (1978) – Dr. Roger Vidal, M.D.
- Sweet Emotion (1978) – Shame (voice)
- The Villain (1979) – Nervous Elk

=== Television ===
- The Red Buttons Show (1955)
- The Good Fairy (1956)
- Stanley (1956–57)
- The Perry Como Show (1961–63)
- The Patty Duke Show (1963, one episode)
- Burke's Law (1963–65, three episodes)
- The Munsters (1964–65, "Dr. Edward Dudley", three episodes)
- The Cara Williams Show (1964, "Charles Crump", episode "Three on a Mismatch")
- Bewitched (1964–71, "Harold Harold", one episode; "Uncle Arthur", 10 episodes)
- The Farmer's Daughter (1965, two episodes)
- Gidget (1965, one episode)
- I Dream of Jeannie (1966–1968, three episodes)
- F Troop (1966, one episode)
- The Hollywood Squares (1966–81)
- Storybook Squares (1969, 1976–77)
- That Girl (1967, one episode)
- Hey, Landlord (1967, one episode)
- The Beverly Hillbillies (1967, one episode)
- The Mothers-In-Law (1968, one episode)
- The Flying Nun (1968, one episode)
- Dean Martin Presents the Golddiggers (1968–1969)
- Gidget Grows Up (1969)
- Cattanooga Cats (1969–71) (voice)
- Love, American Style (1969–74)
- The Perils of Penelope Pitstop (1969–71) (voice) uncredited
- Where's Huddles? (1970) (voice)
- The Jonathan Winters Show (1968–69)
- Gidget Gets Married (1972)
- The Paul Lynde Show (1972–73)
- The New Temperatures Rising Show (1973–74)
- Hong Kong Phooey (1974) (voice)
- Donny & Marie (1976–78)
- The Paul Lynde Halloween Special (1976)
- The Dean Martin Celebrity Roast ("Roastees" Dean Martin & Peter Marshall) (1976–77)
- 'Twas the Night Before Christmas (1977)
- The Carol Burnett Show (1967–1978) Occasional Guest
- America 2-Night (1978)
- Paul Lynde at the Movies (1979)

==== Unsold pilots ====
- Howie (1962, CBS)
- Two's Company (1965, ABC)
- Sedgewick Hawk-Styles: Prince of Danger (1966, ABC)
- Manley and the Mob (1967, ABC)

=== Recordings ===
- Recently Released (1960) Vinyl, LP, Mono; Columbia Records CL1534
