= Jane Actman =

American actress (1949–2018)

- Actman in 1978
- Born: April 6, 1949; New York City, New York, U.S.
- Died: October 20, 2018 (aged 69); New York City, New York, U.S.
- Occupation: Actress
- Years active: 1968–1982
- Spouse: Gene Castle

Jane Actman (April 6, 1949 – October 20, 2018) was an American actress. She played Barbara Simms Dickerson in the short-lived television sitcom The Paul Lynde Show.

== Career ==
Actman began her acting career starring in the Broadway play The Prime of Miss Jean Brodie in 1968.

Later, Actman began her television career guest-starring in The Virginian on the season eight premiere titled "A Woman of Stone" as Laurie Cantrell. In 1970, she appeared in Season 1 of The Partridge Family as Keith Partridge's (David Cassidy) love interest "Tina", a strong willed women's equal rights organizer. In 1972, Actman played Barbara Simms Dickerson in Paul Lynde's comedy series The Paul Lynde Show. In 1976, she was cast in the role of Nancy Lawrence Maitland in the television drama series Family, but she was replaced by Meredith Baxter. She retired after appearing in the television series Trapper John, M.D. in 1979.

== Death ==
Actman died on October 20, 2018, in New York City, at the age of 69.
