= The Paul Lynde Show =

American television sitcom (1972–1973)

- The Paul Lynde Show title card
- Genre: Sitcom
- Created by: Ron Clark; Sam Bobrick
- Based on: Howie by Phoebe Ephron
- Directed by: William Asher; Bruce Bilson; Jack Donohue; Jerry London; Oscar Rudolph; Coby Ruskin; George Tyne
- Starring: Paul Lynde; Elizabeth Allen; John Calvin; Jane Actman; Pamelyn Ferdin
- Composer: Shorty Rogers
- Country of origin: United States
- Original language: English
- No. of seasons: 1
- No. of episodes: 26

Production
- Executive producer: Harry Ackerman
- Producer: William Asher
- Camera setup: Multi-camera
- Running time: approx. 25 mins.
- Production companies: Ashmont Productions; Screen Gems

Original release
- Network: ABC
- Release: September 13, 1972 – March 14, 1973

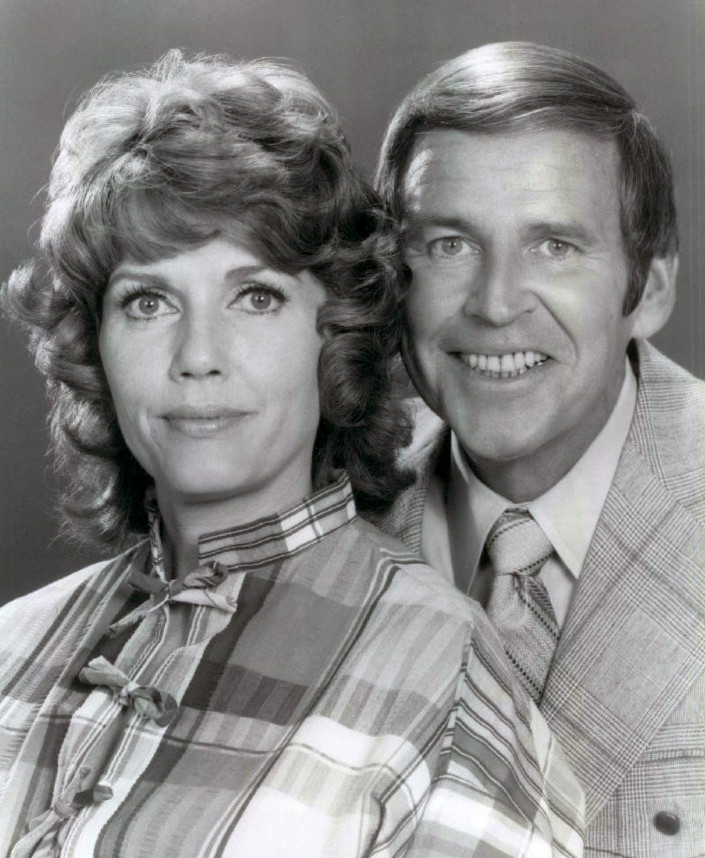
Elizabeth Allen and Paul Lynde

The Paul Lynde Show is an American television sitcom that aired on ABC. The series starred comedian Paul Lynde and aired for one season, with original episodes airing from September 13, 1972, to March 14, 1973.

== Setting ==
The series starred Lynde as Paul Simms, a general-practice attorney and the father of a family that consisted of his wife Martha (Elizabeth Allen) and daughters Barbara (Jane Actman) and Sally (Pamelyn Ferdin). The Simms family lived in the fictional city of Ocean Grove, California.

It also starred John Calvin as Barbara's husband, Howie Dickerson, an eccentric university student who was of genius intelligence (IQ 185) and was a whiz with everything and full of advice, but inexplicably, he could not manage to hold down a job, and Jerry Stiller and Anne Meara as Howie's divorced parents, Barney and Grace Dickerson. Howie's misadventures around the house and his lack of steady employment brought his father-in-law to a state of slow-burn anger and drove him to distraction.

Critics perceived the show as derivative of All in the Family, then television's most popular primetime program, and the Paul Simms role bore similarities to Lynde's best-known film role, that of Harry MacAfee from the film and musical Bye Bye Birdie. For his role in the series, Lynde was nominated for a Best Actor Golden Globe.

== Cast ==
- Paul Lynde as Paul Simms
- Elizabeth Allen as Martha Simms
- John Calvin as Howie Dickerson
- Jane Actman as Barbara Simms Dickerson
- Pamelyn Ferdin as Sally Simms
- James Gregory as T.R. Scott
- Anne Meara as Grace Dickerson
- Allison McKay as Alice
- Jerry Stiller as Barney Dickerson
- Herb Voland as T.J. McNish
- Thelma Carpenter as Thelma
- Mabel Albertson as Mabel
- Charlotte Rae as Aunt Charlotte

== Production ==
The show was based on the play Howie, about a lawyer, played by Lynde, whose daughter marries a slacker named Howard, or "Howie". The Lynde character despises him as he is not interested in earning money or traditional pursuits. Howie was developed for CBS in 1962, as a replacement for The Dick Van Dyke Show, but when that series was saved from cancellation, plans for Howie were shelved.

William Asher later resurrected the Howie concept for ABC and Screen Gems as a replacement for Bewitched. Asher and then-wife Elizabeth Montgomery were contractually obligated for two more seasons of Bewitched for ABC. Montgomery was not interested in continuing the series (she and Asher were also on the verge of divorcing), and Lynde was also under contract to ABC. The Paul Lynde Show (along with the first incarnation of Temperatures Rising) was created to fulfill the contracts. Lynde had appeared eleven times on Bewitched as "Uncle Arthur". Asher designed The Paul Lynde Show to be ABC's counterpart to CBS's All in the Family; however, the show lacked the controversial and topical issues brought up by All in the Family, due to ABC's continued restriction on social issues at the time. This was despite Lynde's rewrite of the show's dialog in an effort to make the series more lively and comedic.

The show was filmed before a live audience, with a laugh track added during post-production for "sweetening" purposes. Unusual for such a series, the production included a frequently seen backyard set with a fully functional swimming pool, which Lynde would occasionally fall into.

The next season, ABC would cast Lynde as the lead on the re-tooled Temperatures Rising over Asher's objections. That series lasted until 1974. ABC would burn off Lynde's contract by placing him in variety shows such as The Paul Lynde Halloween Special, 'Twas the Night Before Christmas and Donny & Marie.

== Reception ==
Scheduled opposite the first half of the Top 30 hit The Carol Burnett Show on CBS and the Top 20 hit Adam-12 on NBC, the first episode proved to be a major hit; strong negative reactions led to bad word of mouth and a resulting collapse in ratings. The show was canceled after a single 26-episode season.

== Episodes ==
| No. | Title | Directed by | Written by | Original release date |
|---|---|---|---|---|
| 1 | "Howie Comes Home to Roost" | William Asher | Sam Bobrick & Ron Clark | September 13, 1972 |
Paul's daughter arrives home from a trip with a brand new husband, Howie, and the young couple sets up residence in the Simms house.
| 2 | "Whiz Kid Sizzles as Quiz Fizzles" | William Asher | Ed Jurist | September 20, 1972 |
Paul Simms is horrified when his son-in-law, Howie, refuses to accept his $4,000 winnings on a quiz show.
| 3 | "The Landlord" | William Asher | S.A. Long | September 27, 1972 |
Paul tries to reconcile Howie's estranged parents (Jerry Stiller and Anne Meara), hoping they'll invite Howie and Barbara to live with them.
| 4 | "No Nudes Is Good Nudes" | William Aher | Bob Fisher & Arthur Marx | October 4, 1972 |
Paul tries to close down a nude stage production, and finds his son-in-law Howie is in the show.
| 5 | "To Commune or Not to Commune" | Bruce Bilson | Bob Fisher & Arthur Marx | October 11, 1972 |
After several arguments with his father-in-law, Howie and his wife Barbara pack up and leave, and move into a commune. Martha refuses to talk to Paul until Howie and Barbara return.
| 6 | "How to Be Unhappy, Though Poor" | William Asher | S.A. Long | October 18, 1972 |
Paul schemes to jolt son-in-law Howie into getting a job. He pretends he's been fired. Howie's reaction is not what Paul desired. Howie decides, rather than find a job, the family must practice severe economies.
| 7 | "Pollution Solution" | Jack Donohue | Bob Fisher & Arthur Marx | October 25, 1972 |
Ecologists Howie and Barbara lead Paul to an anti-pollution demonstration, only it turns out the protest is against one of his own clients.
| 8 | "To Wed or Not to Wed" | Ernest Losso | Bud Grossman | November 1, 1972 |
A snide glow overwhelms Paul when he learns daughter Barbara and husband Howie may not be married after all. Paul sees a way to end the relationship.
| 9 | "Unsteady Going" | Jack Donohue | Bob Fisher & Arthur Marx | November 8, 1972 |
When Paul Simms orders his daughter Sally to break up with her boyfriend, she runs away from home.
| 10 | "Whose Lib?" | Ernest Losso | Bob Fisher & Arthur Marx | November 22, 1972 |
Paul hopes to obtain a gorgeous girl as a vacation replacement for his secretary, but his son-in-law Howie is better qualified for the job.
| 11 | "Meet Aunt Charlotte" | George Tyne | Ed Jurist, Stan Dreben | November 29, 1972 |
Paul's efforts to make a business deal with a Japanese tycoon (Ray Walston) are halted when the gentleman showers attention on Paul's sister Charlotte (Charlotte Rae).
| 12 | "An Affair to Forget" | George Tyne | Bob Fisher & Arthur Marx | December 6, 1972 |
Paul Simms' jealousy is aroused when his wife Martha takes a job as receptionist to a doctor (Roger Perry) who has more than a professional interest in her.
| 13 | "Martha's Last Hurrah" | Jack Donohue | William Raynor & Myles Wilder | December 13, 1972 |
Martha Simms decided to raise funds for a women's lib candidate for the city council. When she's arrested for "soliciting," Paul is called upon to use his legal skills to fight for her cause.
| 14 | "Paul's Desperate Hour" | Bruce Bilson | Ben Starr | December 20, 1972 |
A young man tries to mug Barbara, but she talks him out of it and brings him home. Paul is furious when the mugger becomes a holdup man, and calls his girlfriend to help him haul away the loot.
| 15 | "No More Mr. Nice Guy" | George Tyne | Bernie Kahn | December 27, 1972 |
Paul's blood pressure is up so he has to make an effort to lower it by being nice to Howie. This proves a tremendous strain to everyone, especially when he snaps at the rest of the family and is kind and gentle to Howie.
| 16 | "The Bare Facts" | George Tyne | Robert Fisher & Arthur Marx | January 3, 1973 |
Paul is campaigning for presidency of the bar association. His campaign seems to have come unglued when a tavern owner purchases a nude portrait of his daughter, one painted by his son-in-law.
| 17 | "Howie's Inheritance" | Jerry London | Lawrence Marks | January 10, 1973 |
Righteous Howie learns he has inherited $10,000 but, much to his father-in-law's chagrin, he spurns it because his uncle who left him the money owned a firm which is a big polluter.
| 18 | "P.S. I Loathe You" | Jack Donohue | Bob Carroll Jr. & Madelyn Davis | January 17, 1973 |
Paul Simms vents his hostility toward a senior law partner (James Gregory) by writing a letter which he doesn't intend to mail, but the dry cleaner does.
| 19 | "The Congressman's Son" | George Tyne | Leo Rifkin | January 24, 1973 |
Paul Simms' hopes of obtaining legal representation of a congressional committee rise when Howie becomes friends with the committee chairman's son. Note: Tom Bosley guest stars as the congressman
| 20 | "Out of Bounds" | Oscar Rudolph | William Raynor & Myles Wilder | January 31, 1973 |
When Paul learns that his fence is on a neighbor's (Roger Bowen) property, his legal expertise provides him with several courses of action, all futile.
| 21 | "Is This Trip Necessary?" | George Tyne | Robert Fisher & Arthur Marx | February 7, 1973 |
Paul's mother-in-law (Mabel Albertson) causes his wife Martha to become jealous of his beautiful young law assistant (Elaine Giftos).
| 22 | "Everything You Wanted to Know About Your Mother-in-Law But Were Afraid to Ask" | Coby Ruskin | Robert Fisher & Arthur Marx | February 14, 1973 |
Paul gets bar-side advice from a psychiatrist (Alan Hale Jr.) on handling his mother-in-law (Mabel Albertson) - conquering by kindness.
| 23 | "Back Talk" | Oscar Rudolph | Phil Sharp | February 21, 1973 |
Paul takes to his bed to avoid taking his wife to an annual charity dance, but he makes an instant recovery when Howie brings home a Chinese restaurant owner with acupuncture needles.
| 24 | "Barbara Goes Home to Mother" | Jerry London | T : Marilyn Miller & Monica McGowan; S/T : S.A. Long | February 28, 1973 |
Barbara and Howie have a battle and Barbara storms out. Paul is rather pleased about the fight, but his pleasure soon is diminished when Barbara moves into her parents' room, forcing Paul to sleep on the couch.
| 25 | "Togetherness" | Ernest Losso | Barry E. Blitzer | March 7, 1973 |
Paul's attempts to have a family day to bridge the communications gap turns out to be a disaster.
| 26 | "Springtime for Paul" | Ernest Losso | S.A. Long | March 14, 1973 |
Paul becomes the victim of a college girl's crush when he helps her out with a school paper.
