= Barbara Cason =

American actress (1928–1990)

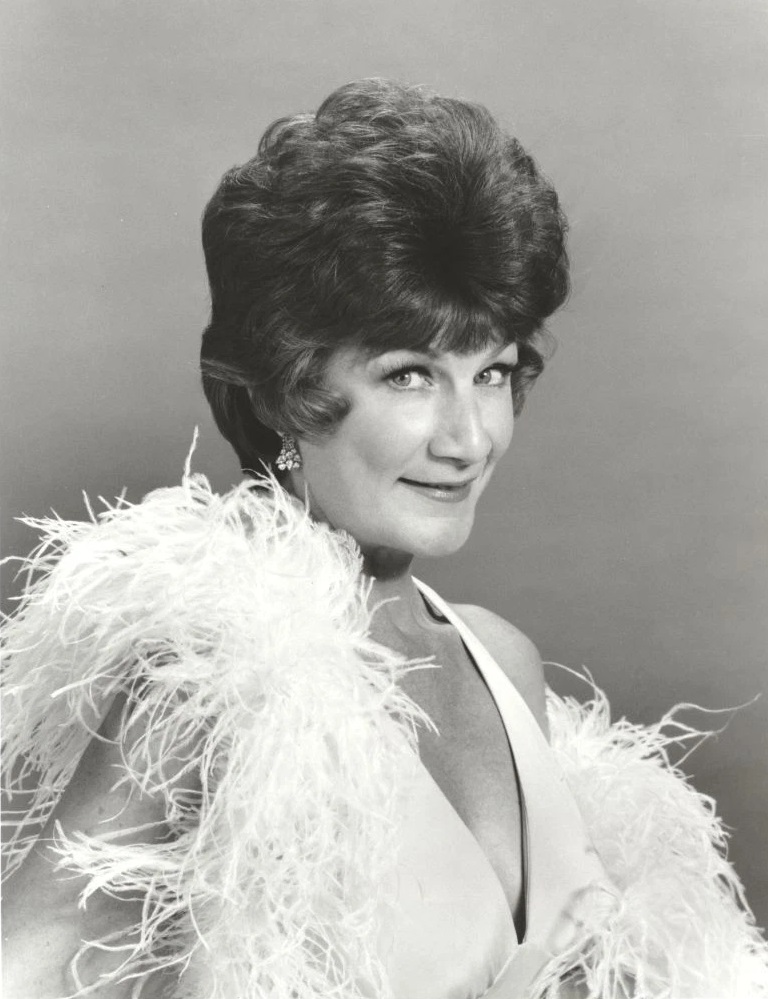
- Cason in The New Temperatures Rising (1973)
- Born: November 15, 1928; Memphis, Tennessee, U.S.
- Died: June 18, 1990 (aged 61); Los Angeles, California U.S.
- Occupations: TV and film actress
- Years active: 1967–1990

Barbara Cason (November 15, 1928 – June 18, 1990) was an American character actress.

== Life and career ==
Cason was born in Memphis, Tennessee, the daughter of Helen Louise (Phebus) and Charles Carroll Cason. She began her career appearing in theatre and on local television in Memphis during the 1950s, where she notably co-founded and ran the Front St. Theatre.

She moved to New York City in 1967, becoming active in theatre there both on and off Broadway through 1973. She most notably starred in the original critically acclaimed production of Noël Coward's Oh, Coward! in 1972–73. She appeared in such cult films as The Honeymoon Killers (1969), Cold Turkey (1971) and Exorcist II: The Heretic (1977) as well as the summer replacement variety television series Comedy Tonight. She was also in the movie House of Dark Shadows (1970) as Mrs. Johnson, when Clarice Blackburn couldn't do the role.

After the early 1970s, Cason's career became centered in Los Angeles, appearing mostly within television up until her death. She is probably best known for her roles as Cloris Phebus on Carter Country (1977–1979) and Ruth Shandling on It's Garry Shandling's Show (1986–1990).

She was married to actor Dennis Patrick from 1970 until her death. She died in Los Angeles, California, aged 61, after a heart attack.

== Filmography ==
| Year | Title | Role | Notes |
|---|---|---|---|
| 1970 | The Honeymoon Killers | Evelyn Long | |
| 1970 | House of Dark Shadows | Mrs. Johnson | |
| 1971 | Cold Turkey | Letitia Hornsby | |
| 1977 | Exorcist II: The Heretic | Mrs. Phalor | |
| 1977 | The Jeffersons | Jean Howard | |
