= Reva Rose =

American actress of stage and screen

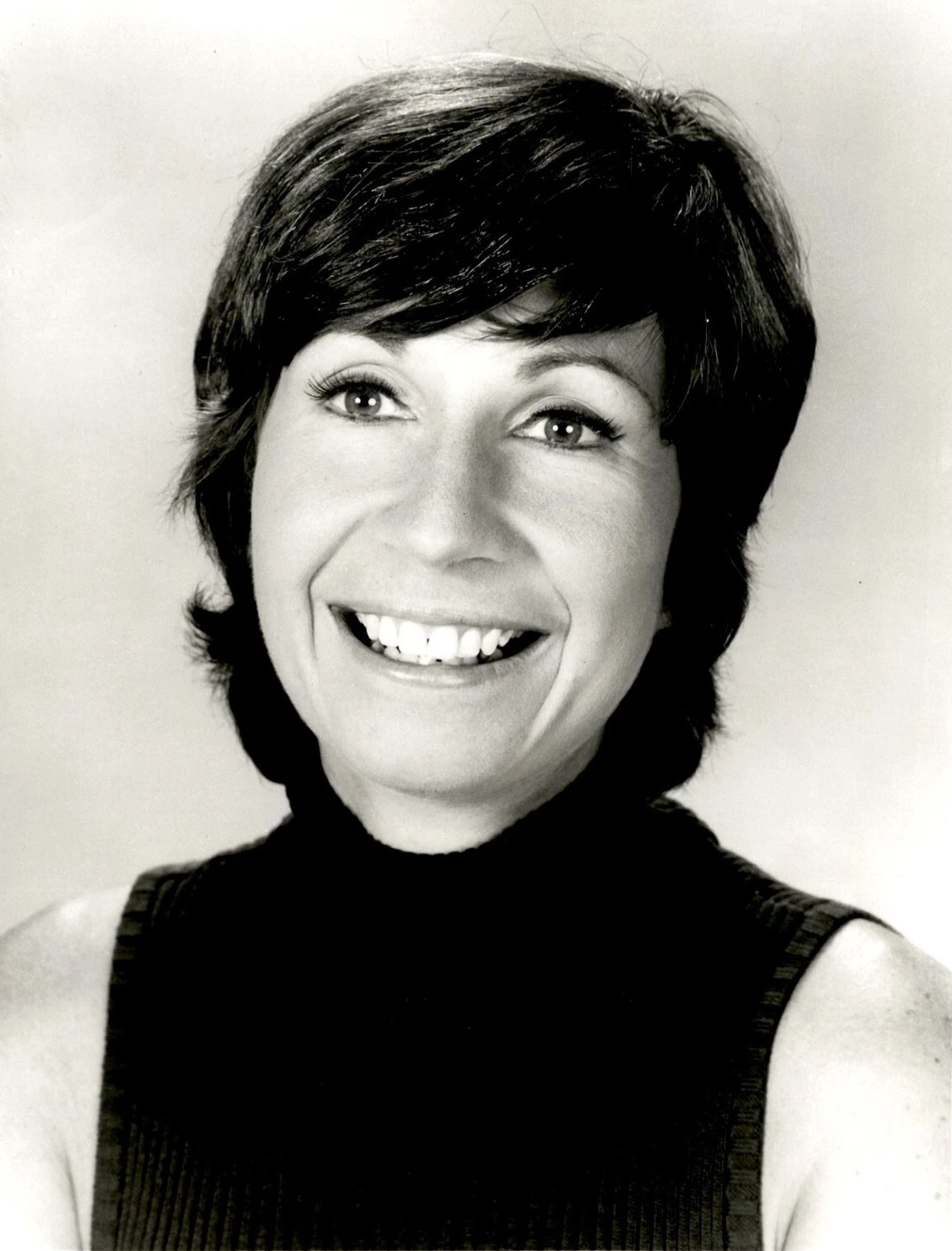
- Rose in Temperatures Rising (1972)
- Occupation: Actress
- Years active: 1961-present

Reva Rose is an American actress of stage and screen, best known for her award-winning performance as Lucy van Pelt in the 1967 Off-Broadway production of Clark Gesner's You're a Good Man, Charlie Brown.

== Career ==
=== Stage ===
As a stage performer, Rose starred alongside Gary Burghoff and Bob Balaban in You're a Good Man, Charlie Brown's original 1967 Off-Broadway run.

She won Theatre World and Clarence Derwent Awards for this role. Rose also appeared in the 1959 farce Look After Lulu!, coincidentally playing the role of Rose. In 2002, she played Tessie Greenglass in Worse Than Murder, a play by Lou Shaw at the Ventura Court Theater in California.

=== Television and film ===
After appearing on the Mister Ed TV series in 1961, Rose has guest-starred on many television shows, including Pete and Gladys, That Girl, Emergency!, Gomer Pyle as Sgt Carter's sister in the episode "My Fair Sister", The Ghost and Mrs. Muir, The Partridge Family, Alice, Mannix, Mary Hartman, Mary Hartman (as coach's wife Blanche Fedders) and To Rome with Love. She also had a regular role in Temperatures Rising as Nurse Mildred MacInerny and as Mrs. Johnson in Sanford and Son's episode "Earthquake II". Rose has also appeared in such films as Three in the Attic, If It's Tuesday, This Must Be Belgium, The Nine Lives of Fritz the Cat, and House Calls. More recently, she was in the 2003 film Exorcism, and on an episode of the TV series Rodney in 2006.
