= Temperatures Rising =

1970s American sitcom television series

- First season cast. Top row: Joan Van Ark, James Whitmore, Cleavon Little; bottom row: Nancy Fox, Reva Rose
- Also known as: The New Temperatures Rising Show
- Genre: Situation comedy
- Developed by: William Asher
- Starring: Cleavon Little; Joan Van Ark; Reva Rose; Nancy Fox; James Whitmore; Paul Lynde; Alice Ghostley; Barbara Rucker
- Composer: Vic Mizzy (1973–74)
- Country of origin: United States
- Original language: English
- No. of seasons: 2
- No. of episodes: 46 (list of episodes)

Production
- Executive producer: Harry Ackerman
- Producers: William Asher; Duke Vincent; Bruce Johnson
- Running time: 22–24 minutes
- Production companies: Ashmont Productions; Screen Gems

Original release
- Network: ABC
- Release: September 12, 1972 – August 29, 1974

Temperatures Rising is an American television sitcom that aired on the ABC network from September 12, 1972 to August 29, 1974. During its 46-episode run, it was presented in three different formats and cast line-ups. The series was developed for the network by William Asher and Harry Ackerman for Ashmont Productions and Screen Gems. Set in a fictional Washington, D.C. hospital, the series first featured James Whitmore as a no-nonsense chief of staff, forced to deal with the outlandish antics of a young intern (Cleavon Little) and three nurses (Joan Van Ark, Reva Rose, and Nancy Fox).

For the first season, 26 episodes were produced and broadcast. In the second season, Whitmore was replaced in the lead role by comedian Paul Lynde, and Asher was replaced as producer by Duke Vincent and Bruce Johnson. The series was re-titled The New Temperatures Rising Show, and featured a new supporting cast: Sudie Bond, Barbara Cason, Jennifer Darling, Jeff Morrow, and John Dehner. Cleavon Little was the only returning member of the original cast. In this season, Lynde was presented as the penny-pinching chief of staff, with Bond as his nagging mother and owner of the hospital.

The New Temperatures Rising Show ran for 13 episodes before being placed on hiatus in January 1974 due to poor ratings. It returned in July in yet another incarnation. Asher returned as producer and restored the series to its original format—albeit with Lynde continuing in the lead. Reverting to the original title of Temperatures Rising, Little remained in the show's cast, accompanied by a new line-up of supporting players: Alice Ghostley, Barbara Rucker and, returning from the first season's cast, Nancy Fox. Offered as a summer replacement on Thursday nights, the third version of the sitcom ran for seven episodes, after which it was cancelled permanently.

== First season ==
=== Concept and development ===
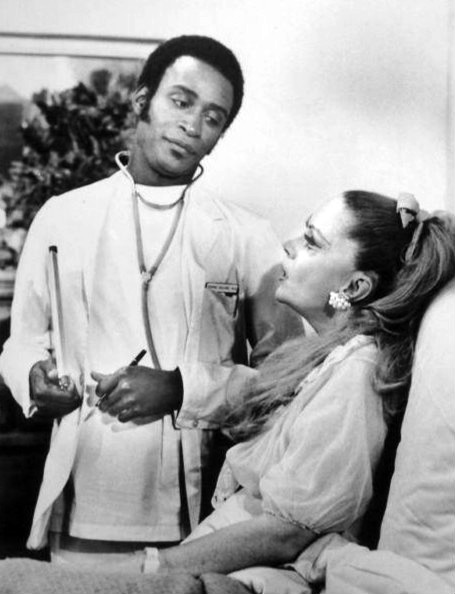
Cleavon Little and Jayne Meadows in the episode "Good Luck, Leftkowitz" (1972)

Temperatures Rising was one of two sitcoms that the ABC network premiered in its 1972–73 prime time schedule, the other being The Paul Lynde Show. (Note: The Paul Lynde Show featured the comedian as Paul Simms, a California attorney who lives with his wife Martha (Elizabeth Allen), daughters Barbara (Jane Actman) and Sally (Pamelyn Ferdin), and Barbara's husband Howie (John Calvin). Much of the show revolves around the generational problem between Simms and Howie, with Howie presented as someone "with an encyclopedic mind who can do just about anything superbly—except hold down a job".) Both series were produced and developed by William Asher and his partner Harry Ackerman for Ashmont Productions and Screen Gems, which had scored a major success for the network with Bewitched, a fantasy sitcom that first aired in 1964 starring Asher's wife, Elizabeth Montgomery. Asher and Screen Gems made a deal with ABC to cancel Bewitched a year earlier than contracts stipulated, thereby allowing them the opportunity to develop the two new sitcoms. Ackerman served as executive producer and Asher as producer.

Asher and Ackerman derived the format of the series from an unsold pilot they had produced for ABC in 1965. Entitled This Is a Hospital?, and written by Sheldon Keller, it starred comedian Shecky Greene as a mischievous intern who Asher referred to as "Sgt. Bilko in a hospital". (Note: Shecky Greene: "I did This is a Hospital for Columbia - Screen Gems. It was terrible.") Asher also drew on the British Carry On franchise as his inspiration for Temperatures Rising.

=== Original cast ===
Set in Capitol General, a fictional Washington, D.C., hospital, the series centered on five characters. Cleavon Little starred as Dr. Jerry Noland, a ghetto-raised intern who works on the side as the hospital bookie and finds humor in anything from an operation to a con job. Joan Van Ark played Annie Carlisle, the hospital's beautiful, young, sexy head nurse, who is "always covering up for the inept crew". Reva Rose played Nurse Mildred "Millie" MacInerny, who offers satirical comments on the shenanigans going on in the hospital. Nancy Fox was cast as Ellen Turner, a shy student nurse who becomes Noland's most faithful follower. James Whitmore starred as Dr. Vincent Campanelli, the hospital's chief of surgery. (Note: James Whitmore's son, Steve, served as his stand-in during production of the series' first season.) Campanelli is presented as an Italian-American former combat surgeon, (Note: Whitmore had actually served in the United States Marine Corps during World War II.) who looks upon Noland with both pride and shock and refers to the young intern and nurses Carlisle, MacInerny, and Turner as the "Four Horsemen of Aggravation".

Little's guest appearance on All in the Family led to his casting in Temperatures Rising, which in turn led to the leading role in the 1974 Mel Brooks comedy film Blazing Saddles. Little's casting reflected "pressure from the government and Negro organizations and concerned whites who believe that black representation on television was long overdue". William Asher later stated that Temperatures Rising gave him a chance to work with a black actor. Fox was cast in Temperatures Rising after Elizabeth Montgomery spotted her in a commercial for Close-Up toothpaste. Asher had considered her for a part in The Paul Lynde Show. During the time that Temperatures Rising was in production, Fox declined an offer to leave the series and star in another, Needles and Pins.

=== Overview ===
In a 2000 interview, William Asher described Temperatures Rising as being about "a young black surgeon who was always into mischief and things, but he was a very competent surgeon. James Whitmore was the head surgeon and he used to drive Whitmore crazy". The pilot episode of Temperatures Rising was written by Sheldon Keller, who turned to his This is a Hospital? script for inspiration. It features Noland broadcasting a bingo game in code over the hospital's public-address system. Jack Albertson guest starred as a United States Senator. Subsequent episodes feature Noland performing a secret operation on a young baseball player while Campanelli deals with a hospital inspector (Ed Platt), and John Astin as a gangster wanting Noland to be his personal physician. In another episode, Noland hypnotizes a patient (Alice Ghostley) and, accidentally, Nurse Turner as well. This nearly costs the hospital a large donation from a potential benefactor (Charles Lane). In later episodes, Campanelli is seen having a brief romance with Nurse Turner's aunt (Beverly Garland), Noland helps out a new intern (Bernie Kopell) who has a reputation for being a jinx, and also performs a witchcraft ritual on a patient (Alan Oppenheimer) who thinks he has been cursed.

Albertson returned in a later episode that features Dr. Campanelli participating in a documentary film about hospital surgery. Unfortunately, Campanelli develops stage fright during filming. Noland then takes over the operation and receives all the acclaim. Kopell returned to his role as a hospital orderly in two episodes, one in which he causes a furor with a hospital scandal sheet, the other showing Noland having to save him from being fleeced by a patient who is also a card shark.

There was some racially tinged comic bantering in the series, such as scenes with Noland giving cotton to a nurse and stating, "Honey, picking cotton is part of my heritage," or observing some adhesive strips labeled "flesh colored" and remarking, "Maybe this is your idea of flesh colored, but it wouldn't make it in my neighborhood." Aside from these, racial issues were avoided, as Asher and Ackerman felt that ABC was not interested in having them mixed into the comedy.

In discussing the series Asher noted:

We too often forget the humanity of doctors and nurses. They become godlike to most of us and yet it is their humanity that makes them so interesting and enjoyable. We are not doing a drama and have no intention of doing anything like dealing with life and death issues. We want to make people laugh so we de-emphasize the more serious elements of hospital life. It isn't that he [Noland] just sees things differently, he also deals with them differently. That is why Noland will dream up a baby derby, a gambling night at the hospital, a variety show at Christmas and off-track betting when patients get bored with the hospital routine.

Production of Temperatures Rising was underway by August 1972 with filming done at the Burbank Studios in Burbank, California.

=== Original reviews ===
In his review of the premiere episode of Temperatures Rising for the Los Angeles Times, critic Don Page felt that James Whitmore was "totally wasted in this silly exercise" and that "guest Jack Albertson almost saves it with his portrayal of an annoyed senator. Otherwise, the diagnosis is terminal comedy". Likewise, Cecil Smith, another writer for the Times, claimed it was the "worst show of the season. Avoid it like the plague".

Other reviews were more favorable. Columnist Joan Crosby noted that "This is the kind of show you don't think you'll laugh at, but you do, mostly because the cast is so good." She noted that Cleavon Little, Joan Van Ark, and Reva Rose were, respectively, "marvelous", "pretty", and "funny", and that Nancy Fox "wins this year's cute-as-a-kitten award". Barbara Holsopple, TV and radio editor for the Pittsburgh Press, noted that "ABC did a gutsy turnabout in taking the heavy drama out of a hospital and replacing it with comedy. The venture worked well, thanks to excellent performances from the Temperatures Rising cast". She praised Albertson, noted that Whitmore "was little seen", and that the series: "is the kind of tidy little show that brings chuckles". Win Fanning, a syndicated columnist, stated that: "the comedy writing and performances by a beautifully integrated cast give Temperatures a bright, light quality so seldom achieved in a situation comedy", and that it was: "loaded with one-liners and sight gags, which, if kept on the level of the opener, promise many hours of hilarity". Fanning praised Little as "one of the comedy finds of any TV season", and Fox as "a fresh new face and talent giving promise of a long, successful career ahead". More praise for the series came after the broadcast of its fourth episode. An unidentified reviewer, writing for the Armored Sentinel (of Temple, Texas), stated "If you're suffering from a case of the 'downs,' this series is a sure pick up!" The reviewer went on to note that "the brightest spot of the series is wacky Nancy Fox. Her role applies the wackiness of Goldie Hawn, but in situation comedy form. I'd watch the show just for her! The whole series is wacky and funny; it's downright good. I highly recommend it."

=== First season ratings ===
Selected weeks showing Nielsen ratings positions for Tuesdays at 8:00 PM
Week ending	ABC Temperatures Rising	CBS Maude	NBC Bonanza	NBC Movies	Ref
November 5, 1972	47	12	46	—N/a	
December 10, 1972	45	8	52	—N/a	
January 7, 1973	42	14	55	—N/a	
January 14, 1973	29	16	48	—N/a	
January 21, 1973	29	16	52	—N/a	
February 4, 1973	47	6	—N/a	52	
February 11, 1973	43	8	—N/a	41	

ABC placed Temperatures Rising in its 8:00 PM Tuesday night time-slot, where it debuted on September 12, 1972. (Note: Prior to the debut of Temperatures Rising, its Tuesday night time slot was occupied by the second half of the popular hour-long crime drama series Mod Squad. When the FCC forced the networks to reduce their prime-time scheduling from 3½ hours to three, Mod Squad had to be moved to Thursday nights at 8:00. On September 14, 1972—two days after Temperatures Rising first aired—the fifth year of Mod Squad began with "The Connection", a special two-hour season premiere that featured Cleavon Little as one of its guest stars.) Because one of the stars was black, some of ABC's affiliated stations in the southern and midwestern parts of the United States refused to air the series or broadcast it in a different time slot. Airing opposite it were Bonanza on NBC, and the new sitcom Maude on CBS. Bonanza was entering its fourteenth year and offered up an ambitious two-hour season premiere dealing with the marriage of Little Joe Cartwright (Michael Landon). (Note: Originally this was to be about the wedding of Dan Blocker's character, Hoss Cartright. However, the episode was revised following Blocker's death in the summer of 1972.) Maude, starring Beatrice Arthur in the title role, was a spin-off of All in the Family. Both shows presented Temperatures Rising with stiff opposition in the "ratings game". The two-hour season premiere of Bonanza performed exceptionally well in the ratings. Maude did much better than Temperatures Rising in the New York City area, while Temperatures Rising fared better than Maude in the Los Angeles area. In subsequent weeks, Bonanza's ratings dropped sharply and NBC cancelled the series in November 1972. (Note: The final broadcast of Bonanza was on January 16, 1973.) According to Asher: "Temperatures Rising put Bonanza out of business and was beating Maude in the Los Angeles area until mid-season, when NBC switched to some heavy movies which hurt us". Despite this the series finished its first year with a consistent 29 share of the ratings at a time when a 30 share was enough to assure renewal for another season. ABC, however, wanted to improve the ratings and decided to make significant changes to Temperatures Rising for its second season. The first season finished 48th out of 75 shows, with an average 17.3 rating.

== Second season ==
=== New premise and producers ===
As early as November 1972, James Whitmore expressed a desire to leave Temperatures Rising, claiming that "the show [was] basically a broad farce and I didn't feel it was right for me". Screen Gems head John Mitchell and ABC chief programmer Barry Diller decided to replace Whitmore with comedian Paul Lynde, whose sitcom, The Paul Lynde Show, was airing on Wednesday nights. At the time, Lynde was scoring second only to Peter Falk in TV popularity polls even though his sitcom, which aired opposite The Sonny & Cher Comedy Hour on CBS, was floundering in the ratings. Asher was against making this change but was overruled as his contractual commitments to ABC had finished.

Of the change Asher stated:

The network–ugh–they're so stupid sometimes. The shows [Temperatures Rising and The Paul Lynde Show] were doing good, they weren't big hits, but they were doing good. They felt that if they could put Paul [Lynde] and Cleavon Little together that they would have a big hit. I didn't want to do that. I said I won't do it, not at the sacrifice of the show. It's wrong. I don't think it's a good idea. But they wanted to bring in somebody else as the head of the hospital. They wanted his [Lynde's] mother to be head of the hospital and his conflicts would be with her and I just didn't think it was right. I didn't want to write it. I just didn't want to do it [and] I didn't. Someone else came in. It was a big thing with the network. They cancelled The Paul Lynde Show and put Paul in Temperatures Rising."

Asher was replaced as producer by Bruce Johnson and E. Duke Vincent, whose previous credits included Gomer Pyle – USMC, The Jim Nabors Hour, Arnie, and The Little People. (Note: Despite the changes, William Asher and Harry Ackerman retained ownership of the series.) They changed the title of the series to The New Temperatures Rising Show, and the tone went from lighthearted wackiness to a form of black comedy similar to The Hospital, a 1971 film written by Paddy Chayefsky, starring George C. Scott. The sitcom became "a savage satire of the medical profession" with $185-a-day hospital rooms, incompetent, fee-splitting doctors, operations on the wrong patients, misread X-rays, and rampant malpractice. Commenting on the series Vincent noted:

We're not doing stories about a fouled-up hospital. These things really happen. Every story we've told is true. They're the results of untrained people, inadequate staff, horrendous costs, worn-out equipment, the demands of doctors. The doctors, not the patients, are the customers; they're the ones the hospitals have to please ...

=== Revised cast ===
The cast of the second season. Front row: Jennifer Darling, Sudie Bond, Barbara Cason; back row: Cleavon Little, Paul Lynde, Jeff Morrow

For this new season, Johnson and Vincent dropped Joan Van Ark, Reva Rose, and Nancy Fox from the series, leaving Cleavon Little as the only returning cast member. His character, Dr. Jerry Noland, was now being presented as the hospital's only sane figure. Paul Lynde played Dr. Paul Mercy, the sneering, unscrupulous, hospital administrator while Sudie Bond was cast as Martha Mercy, his obnoxious, overbearing mother and the owner, and permanent resident, of the hospital. She constantly calls him with her pager to complain about everything. Also in the new cast were Barbara Cason as Miss Tillis, the head of administrative and accounting: "... who would let you bleed to death filling out forms", Jennifer Darling as the romantically inclined nurse "Windy" Winchester, and Jeff Morrow as Dr. Lloyd Axton, a fraudulent surgeon who has published two books, Profit in Healing and Malpractice and Its Defense. After only two episodes, Morrow was replaced by John Dehner as "society" Dr. Charles Claver.

=== Revised concept ===
For the 1973–74 television season ABC continued to air the revamped Temperatures Rising on Tuesday nights at 8:00 PM. CBS continued to air Maude, and NBC introduced Chase, an hour-long crime drama starring Mitchell Ryan, in the same time slot. Although the season premiere of Maude and Chase's debut aired on September 11, 1973, ABC delayed the premiere of The New Temperatures Rising Show until September 25. (Note: On September 11, 1973, instead of broadcasting Temperatures Rising / The New Temperatures Rising Show, ABC aired The Furst Family of Washington, an unsold pilot starring Godfrey Cambridge and Theresa Merritt; that pilot would later be re-developed into That's My Mama, which debuted in the Fall of 1974. On September 18 the network aired Egan, a special half-hour drama starring former New York City Police Officer Eddie Egan as himself.)

The episodes produced by Johnson and Vincent included Dr. Mercy exploiting a 125-year-old Civil War veteran and dealing with a strike by the doctors and nurses. Another episode saw Noland create a mythical patient and then claim that the patient died, the cause of death being the result of a lack of cardiac crash carts on each floor of the hospital. Johnson and Vincent's favorite episode was one where the X-rays of a professional footballer are misread, resulting in him being placed by mistake in "Crutchfield's Traction", in which holes are drilled in his head and tongs inserted in them.

=== Second season reviews ===
In reviewing The New Temperatures Rising Show, Associated Press television writer Jay Sharbutt noted:

First the hopeful note: There are faint signs the tinkering with Temperatures format could make the series funny later on, but only if the writing improves. The show now leaves most of the mugging to Lynde and no longer insists that each regular is wacky. It's all feeble stuff but the cast is vastly improved and the new approach portends to better things ahead.

Likewise, Los Angeles Times critic Cecil Smith, who considered the original format "maybe the three worst shows on television rolled into one" now remarked: "Paul Lynde for the first time that I can recall has a part worthy of his mettle. The people surrounding him are first rate."

=== Sinking ratings ===
Despite some heavy promotion, the black comedy approach was not what audiences wanted to see, especially with Paul Lynde. As a result, the ratings for the series fell well below the levels of the previous season. The last of The New Temperatures Rising Show's thirteen episodes aired on January 8, 1974. The following Tuesday, January 15, ABC premiered Happy Days in its place. (Note: On that same day and time NBC replaced Chase with their popular series Adam-12.) According to co-producer Mitchell, "... the audience didn't buy that at all. They just didn't get it. It was funny if you like black comedy, but if you don't it would disturb you. So the show failed miserably and we lost the job and the show."

== Summer replacement ==
=== Third concept ===
When John Mitchell and Barry Diller noticed that The New Temperatures Rising Show was failing, they contacted William Asher and asked him to salvage the series. According to Asher:

They asked if I'd go back to the old Temperatures, only this time with Paul [Lynde]. At this point we were still hoping to make it for the midseason. After a couple of weeks we agreed that the show should go off the air in January, but continue production so that we would have 11 shows ready for airing any time they wanted them. Some of the nonsense and hijinks of the first season are gone and we have managed to keep a touch of reality of the second version.

As to why the series was not cancelled, Asher remarked, "I can answer that in two words: Paul Lynde."

=== Final cast ===
For the third format, the show reverted to its original title Temperatures Rising, and the proposed number of episodes was reduced from eleven to seven. The series' production resumed on November 17, 1973, after a three-week shutdown. Sudie Bond, Barbara Cason, Jennifer Darling, and John Dehner were dropped from the cast and a new line-up was assembled. Paul Lynde continued as Dr. Paul Mercy while Alice Ghostley played Edwina Moffitt, the admissions nurse and Dr. Mercy's sister. She had appeared (in a completely different role) as a guest star in an episode in the first season of Temperatures Rising. Nancy Fox returned as student nurse Ellen Turner, and Barbara Rucker was introduced as Nurse Amanda Kelly. Cleavon Little returned for a third time as Dr. Jerry Noland, whose character was now being presented as somewhere between the jive-talking surgeon of the first season and the serious one of the second.

=== Last format and cancellation ===
Temperatures Rising returned to the ABC network on July 18, 1974 after a six-month hiatus. Its new time slot, Thursday nights at 8:00 PM, had previously been occupied by Chopper One, an adventure series. The situations presented this time around included Dr. Mercy saving the life of a popular country music singer (Dick Gautier), and setting up a surveillance system so that staff would be kept on their toes.

The final episode of Temperatures Rising aired on August 29, 1974. (Note: Following the demise of Temperatures Rising ABC moved The Odd Couple into the Thursday, 8:00 PM, time-slot.) The attempt to resuscitate the series was unsuccessful, and ABC finally cancelled it permanently. Andy Siegel, a comedy development executive for ABC at the time, felt the series failed because audiences did not want to watch a show displaying inadequate medical care, even though it was done in a humorous fashion. In reminiscing about the series he stated: "When people see doctors on television they really want to feel that they're in good hands. That no matter what happens it is a reassuring experience." William Asher, in a 2000 interview, summed up the demise of the series by saying: "It didn't get on. It's too late. You can't do that to an audience. They won't accept it."

The second season ranked 68th out of 80 shows, with an average 13.6 rating.
