= Cleavon Little =

American actor (1939–1992)

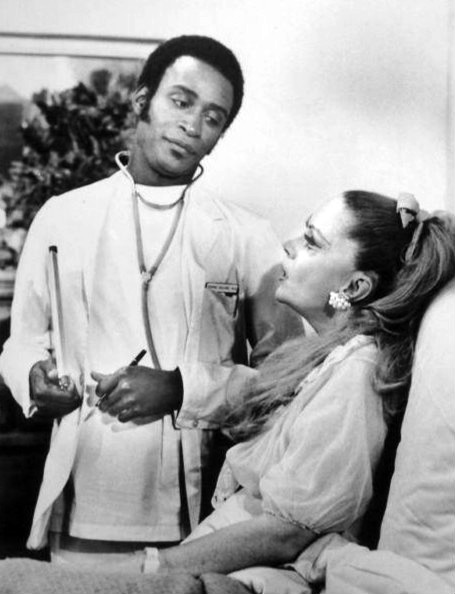
- Little and Jayne Meadows on Temperatures Rising (1972)
- Born: Cleavon Jake Little; June 1, 1939; Chickasha, Oklahoma, U.S.
- Died: October 22, 1992 (aged 53); Sherman Oaks, California, U.S.
- Education: San Diego City College; San Diego State University (BA); Juilliard School (GrDip); American Academy of Dramatic Arts
- Occupation: Actor
- Years active: 1960–1992
- Spouse: Valerie Wiggins (m. 1972; div. 1974)
- Children: Adia Millett
- Awards: Drama Desk Award (Purlie, 1970); Tony Award (Purlie, 1970); Primetime Emmy Award (Dear John, 1989)

Cleavon Jake Little (June 1, 1939 – October 22, 1992) was an American actor. He began his career in the late 1960s on the stage. In 1970, he starred in the Broadway production of Purlie, for which he earned both a Tony Award and a Drama Desk Award. His first leading television role was that of the irreverent Dr. Jerry Noland on the ABC sitcom Temperatures Rising (1972–1974). While starring in the sitcom, Little appeared in what has become his signature role, portraying Sheriff Bart in the 1974 Mel Brooks comedy film Blazing Saddles.

In the 1980s, Little continued to appear in stage productions, films, and in guest spots on television series. In 1989, he won a Primetime Emmy Award for his appearance on the NBC sitcom Dear John. He later starred in the Fox sitcom True Colors (1991–1992).

== Early life ==
Little was the brother of singer DeEtta Little West, best known for her performance (with Nelson Pigford) of the vocals on the chart-topping Bill Conti song "Gonna Fly Now", the main theme to Rocky. He had another sister, Rosemarie Little Martin, and two brothers, Everett and Roy.

Little was raised in San Diego, California, and attended Kearny High School, graduating in 1957. He appeared in A Raisin in the Sun in 1962 at the Old Globe Theatre in San Diego and graduated from San Diego State College in 1965 with a degree in speech therapy. He worked his way through college as a janitor and gave Black poetry presentations to clubs and groups. He won a scholarship from the American Broadcasting Company to attend the American Academy of Dramatic Arts in New York City and was named the best actor in the class of 1967.

== Career ==
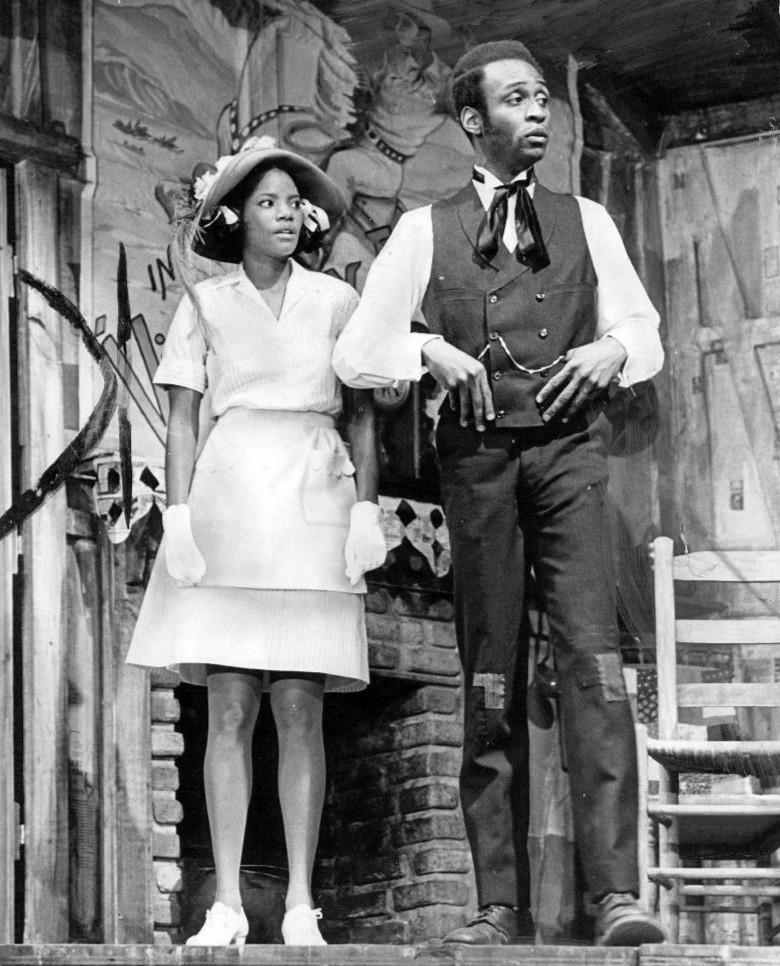
Melba Moore and Little in the Broadway musical Purlie (1970)

Little made his professional debut in February 1967, appearing off-Broadway at the Village Gate as the Muslim Witch in the original production of Barbara Garson's MacBird. This was followed by the role of Foxtrot in the original production of Bruce Jay Friedman's long-running play Scuba Duba, which premiered in October 1967. While portraying Foxtrot at night, he portrayed Hamlet during the days at schools and parks on behalf of the New York Shakespeare Festival.

The following year, he made his first film appearance in a small uncredited role in What's So Bad About Feeling Good? (1968), and his first television appearance as a guest star on two episodes of Felony Squad. A series of small roles followed in films such as John and Mary (1969) and Cotton Comes to Harlem (1970).

Little made his Broadway debut in 1969 as Lee Haines in John Sebastian and Murray Schisgal's musical Jimmy Shine with Dustin Hoffman in the title role. In 1970, he returned to Broadway to play the title role in Ossie Davis's musical Purlie, for which he won the Tony Award for Best Actor in a Musical and the Drama Desk Award for Outstanding Actor in a Musical.

A year later, Little was hired as an ensemble player on the syndicated TV variety weekly The David Frost Revue and he portrayed Shogo in Narrow Road to the Deep North on Broadway. In 1971, Little was chosen to portray the blind radio personality Super Soul in the car-chase movie Vanishing Point. The same year, he played preacher Hawthorne Dooley in the pilot for The Waltons called "The Homecoming: A Christmas Story", helping John-Boy Walton search for his father; then appeared as a different character in season four, in an episode called "The Fighter," about a prizefighter who desires to build a church and be a preacher. He also played a burglar in a 1971 episode of All in the Family titled "Edith Writes a Song".

He then starred on the ABC sitcom Temperatures Rising, which aired in three different iterations from 1972 to 1974, with Little's character of Dr. Jerry Noland as the only common element. In 1974, he starred in the television disaster film The Day the Earth Moved, opposite Jackie Cooper and Stella Stevens. Little made a minor appearance in the Six Million Dollar Man episode "Population: Zero", as one of the NASA deliveryman handing Colonel Steve Austin his space suit.

In 1974 he was cast as Sheriff Bart in Brooks's comedy western Blazing Saddles (1974), after the studio rejected Richard Pryor, who co-wrote the script. Studio executives were apparently concerned about Pryor's reliability, given his reputation for drug use and unpredictable behavior, and thought Little would be a safer choice. This role earned him a nomination for the BAFTA Award for Most Promising Newcomer to Leading Film Roles.

In 1975, Little returned to Broadway to portray the role of Lewis in the original production of Murray Schisgal's All Over Town under the direction of Dustin Hoffman. The following year, he appeared as Willy Stepp in the original production of Ronald Ribman's The Poison Tree at the Ambassador Theatre.

Over the years, he made guest appearances on a variety of television shows, including ABC Afterschool Specials, The Fall Guy, Fantasy Island, The Love Boat, MacGyver, The Mod Squad, Police Story, The Rockford Files, The Rookies, and a special Christmas episode of ALF.

== Later career ==
Little played a supporting role to Pryor in the racing movie Greased Lightning (1977), based on the true life story of Wendell Scott, the first black stock car racing winner in America. Other films included FM (1978), Scavenger Hunt (1979), The Salamander (1981), High Risk (1981), Jimmy the Kid (1982), Surf II (1984), Toy Soldiers (1984), Once Bitten (1985), The Gig (1985) and Fletch Lives (1989).

Little was considered for a role on the hit TV series Taxi which starred Judd Hirsch and debuted in 1978, but he was ultimately not hired.

Little returned to the New York stage in 1981 in the off-Broadway production The Resurrection of Lady Lester, a "poetic mood song" by OyamO, playing the legendary jazz saxophonist Lester Young.

In December 1985, Little opened at Broadway's Booth Theatre as Midge in Herb Gardner's play I'm Not Rappaport with Judd Hirsch, who won the Tony Award for Best Actor in a Play. Little had originated the role of Midge in the Seattle Repertory Theatre production.

In 1989 he appeared as a closeted gay man in Hirsch's sitcom Dear John in the episode "Stand by Your Man", for which Little won the Primetime Emmy Award for Outstanding Guest Actor in a Comedy Series, defeating Robert Picardo, Jack Gilford, Leslie Nielsen, and Sammy Davis Jr.

Little was slated to star on the television series Mr. Dugan, where he was to play a black congressman, but that series was poorly received by real black congressmen and was cancelled before making it to air. In 1991, he replaced Frankie Faison as Ronald Freeman, a black dentist married to a white housewife, on the Fox sitcom True Colors. The same year, he also had a supporting role on the television series Bagdad Cafe, appearing in 12 episodes. Later that year, he was cast as a civil-rights lawyer in the docudrama, Separate but Equal, starring Sidney Poitier, who portrayed the first black U.S. Supreme Court Justice, Thurgood Marshall, NAACP lead attorney in the 1954 Supreme Court case that desegregated public schools. He also appeared in the television series MacGyver as Frank Colton, one half of a bounty hunter brother duo.

Little's last appearance as an actor was in a guest role on a 1992 episode of the television series Tales from the Crypt entitled "This'll Kill Ya". Eleven years after his death, he appeared in the music video for "Show Me How to Live" by Audioslave, through archive footage from Vanishing Point.

== Personal life ==
Little married Valerie Wiggins in 1972. They divorced in 1974. His daughter is Adia Millett.

Little died of colon cancer at his home in the Sherman Oaks area of Los Angeles on October 22, 1992.

== Legacy ==
For Little's contribution to motion pictures, he was posthumously honored with a star on the Hollywood Walk of Fame on February 1, 1994. The star is located on the south side of Hollywood Boulevard near El Cerrito Place.

The Cleavon Little Scholarship, which provides assistance to minority students, was created at the American Academy of Dramatic Arts through a campaign led by Little's fellow alumnus and co-star Judd Hirsch.

== Filmography ==
| Year | Title | Role | Notes |
|---|---|---|---|
| 1968 | What's So Bad About Feeling Good? | Phil | Uncredited role |
| 1969 | John and Mary | The Film Director | |
| 1970 | Cotton Comes to Harlem | "Lo Boy" | |
| 1971 | Vanishing Point | "Super Soul" | |
| 1971 | The Waltons – The Homecoming: A Christmas Story | Hawthorne Dooley | |
| 1971 | All in the Family | Coke, 1st Burglar | Episode: Edith Writes A Song |
| 1973 | Money to Burn | Calvin Baker | ABC Movie of the Week |
| 1972–1974 | Temperatures Rising | Dr. Jerry Noland | TV series – 46 episodes |
| 1974 | The Day the Earth Moved | Harley Copeland | ABC Movie of the Week |
| 1974 | Blazing Saddles | Bart | |
| 1975 | The Waltons | James Trevis Clark / The Ebony Flash | Episode: The Fighter |
| 1977 | The Rockford Files | Billy Merrihew | S03-E13 |
| 1977 | Greased Lightning | "Peewee" | |
| 1978 | FM | Prince | |
| 1979 | Scavenger Hunt | Jackson | |
| 1980 | The Love Boat | | |
| 1981 | The Salamander | Major Carl Malinowski, USMC | |
| 1981 | High Risk | Rockney | |
| 1981 | Fantasy Island | Charlie Raines | S04-E21 |
| 1982 | Jimmy the Kid | Herb | |
| 1982 | The Fall Guy | Max | |
| 1982 | Double Exposure | Police Chief | |
| 1982 | Another World | Captain Hancock | 2 episodes |
| 1983 | Simon & Simon | Jared Swope | Episode: Red Dog Blues |
| 1984 | Surf II | Principal "Daddy O" | |
| 1984 | Toy Soldiers | Buck | |
| 1984 | E. Nick: A Legend in His Own Mind | Edmundo | |
| 1985 | Once Bitten | Sebastian | |
| 1985 | The Gig | Marshall Wilson | |
| 1987 | ALF | George Foley | Episode: ALF’s Christmas Special |
| 1988 | Tanner '88 | The Reverend Billy Crier | HBO Miniseries |
| 1988 | Lincoln | Frederick Douglass | 2 episodes (miniseries) |
| 1989 | Dear John | Tony Larkin | Episode: Stand by Your Man |
| 1989 | Fletch Lives | Calculus Entropy | |
| 1989 | MacGyver | Frank Colton | Episode: Black Corsage |
| 1990 | Goin' to Chicago | Edward Sr. | |
| 1990 | Murder by Numbers | David Shelby | |
| 1990 | Midnight Caller | Reverend James Allen | Episode: "The Reverend Soundbite" |
| 1990 | American Playhouse | Nate Shaw | Episode: "All God's Dangers" |
| 1990-1991 | Bagdad Cafe | Sal | 12 episodes |
| 1991 | Separate but Equal | Robert L. Carter | |
| 1991 | In the Nick of Time | Freddy | |
| 1991 | Perfect Harmony | Pastor Clarence Johnson | |
| 1991-1992 | True Colors | Ron Freeman | 11 episodes |
| 1992 | Tales from the Crypt | Pack Brightman | Episode: This'll Kill 'Ya |

== Theater ==
- Purlie, Broadway play (1970)
- All Over Town, Broadway play (1974)
- I'm Not Rappaport, Broadway play (1985)
- All God's Dangers, one-person Off-Broadway play (1989), based on the oral history of Ned Cobb
