= John Calvin (actor) =

American film and television actor (b. 1947)

- Born: November 29, 1947 (age 78); Staten Island, New York City, U.S.
- Occupations: Film and television actor
- Years active: 1971–1995

John Calvin (born November 29, 1947) is an American film and television actor. He played Howie Dickerson in the short-lived television sitcom The Paul Lynde Show. He also played Justin Hooke in the miniseries The Dark Secret of Harvest Home and Reverend Willie Tenboom in the adventure drama Tales of the Gold Monkey.

Calvin guest-starred in numerous television programs including Taxi, Night Court, Quantum Leap, The A-Team, Murder, She Wrote, In the Heat of the Night, and Hart to Hart.
