= List of entrepreneurs =

This is a list of entrepreneurs by century. An entrepreneur is the owner or manager of a business enterprise who makes money through risk and initiative. This list includes notable entrepreneurs.

== Pre-18th-century entrepreneurs ==
- Regina Basilier (1572–1631), Swedish-German banker, trader and investor
- Birgitta Durell (1619–1683), Dutch-Swedish manufacturer-industrialist
- Jakob Fugger (1459–1525), German merchant, mining entrepreneur, and banker
- Louis De Geer (1587–1652), Walloon-born Dutch-Swedish businessman and industrialist; active mainly in the Dutch Republic and Sweden
- Flavia Seia Isaurica (fl. 140s), ancient Roman businesswoman in the brick industry
- Isaac Le Maire (c.1558–1624), Walloon-born Dutch businessman and investor; active mainly in the Dutch Republic
- Johan Palmstruch (1611–1671), Latvian-born Dutch-Swedish businessman, investor, and financial innovator; active mainly in the Dutch Republic and Sweden
- Pierre-Paul Riquet (1609–1680), French entrepreneur, creator of the Canal du Midi

== 18th-century entrepreneurs ==
- Anna Elisabeth Baer 1878–1955 (shipping business), Finland
- Samuel Crompton 1753–1827 (spinning mule), Great Britain
- Caroline Gother 1761–1836 (banking), Sweden
- Johns Hopkins 1795–1873 (personal business), U.S.
- Anna Lohe 1654–1731 (banking business), Sweden
- Thomas Newcomen 1664–1729 (steam engine), Great Britain
- Charlotta Richardy 1751–1831 (manufacture), Sweden
- Brigitta Sahlgren 1694–1771 (sugar), Sweden
- James Watt 1736–1819 (tugboats), Great Britain
- Josiah Wedgwood 1730–1795 (pottery), Great Britain
- Robert Wood Johnson I 1845–1910 (medical device), U.S.

== 19th-century entrepreneurs ==
- John Jacob Astor (real estate), U.S.
- Augusta Björkenstam (transportation), Sweden
- George Cadbury (confectionery), UK
- Andrew Carnegie (steel), Pittsburgh, U.S. and Scotland
- James Buchanan Duke (tobacco), U.S.
- Thomas Alva Edison (film, telecommunication, technology, scientific research, energy), U.S.
- Charles T. Hinde (shipping, railroads, hotels), U.S.
- Quah Beng Kee (Ferry, Shipping), Penang, Malaysia
- Pryce Pryce-Jones (mail order pioneer), UK
- Biddy Mason (real estate), California, U.S.
- J. P. Morgan (finance), U.S.
- Antoinette Nording (perfume), Sweden
- John D. Rockefeller (oil), U.S.
- Joseph Rowntree (confectionery), UK
- Joseph Seligman (banking), U.S.
- Eugene Sharrer (plantations, retail, river steamers), Nyasaland (present-day Malawi)
- Claus Spreckels (sugar industry), Germany
- Leland Stanford (railroads), California, U.S.
- Levi Strauss (retail), U.S./Germany
- Jamsetji Tata (shipping, steel industry, hotels, education), India
- Nikola Tesla (AC induction motor), U.S., Yugoslavia (born in Austro-Hungarian Empire)
- Alessandro Torlonia (banking), Italy
- Richard Trevithick (mining and steam engines), Great Britain
- Cornelius Vanderbilt (railroads), U.S.
- George Westinghouse (railroad braking, switching, and signalling systems; commercialization of natural gas; development, transmission and application of AC electricity), U.S.

== 20th-century entrepreneurs ==
- Agha Hasan Abedi (banking), Pakistan
- Paul Allen (computers, scientific research, real estate, media, education, entertainment, artificial intelligence, space, philanthropy), U.S.
- Dhirubhai Ambani (reliance industries), India
- Mary Kay Ash (cosmetics), U.S.
- Bang Si-hyuk (music), South Korea
- Otto Beisheim (retail), Germany
- William Boeing (aviation), U.S.
- Warren Buffett (investor), U.S.
- Richard Branson (media, transportation, space), UK
- Coco Chanel (fashion), France
- Jack Cohen (retail), UK
- Michael Dell (computers), U.S.
- Oscar Deutsch (cinemas), UK
- Richard M. DeVos, Sr. (multi-level marketing), U.S.
- Walt Disney (animation), U.S.
- James Dyson (vacuum cleaner), UK
- Larry Ellison (computers), U.S.
- Fan Hongwei (petrochemicals), China
- Enzo Ferrari (sports cars), Italy
- Henry Ford (automobile manufacturing), U.S.
- Bill Gates (computers, philanthropy, investments) U.S.
- Henry Hu (technology), Hong Kong
- Howard Hughes (aviation, film), U.S.
- John James (radio & TV retailing, manufacturing, philanthropy), U.K.
- Steve Jobs (computers, technology, animation), U.S.
- Dean Kamen (technology), U.S.
- Ingvar Kamprad (retail), Sweden
- Vinod Khosla (technology), U.S.
- Ferruccio Lamborghini (sports cars), Italy
- Estée Lauder (cosmetics), U.S.
- Jorge Loring Martinez (aviation), Spain
- Vijay Mallya (breweries), India
- Jim Marshall (music equipment), UK
- Terry Matthews (technology), Canada
- Kiran Mazumdar-Shaw (biotechnology), India
- Vince McMahon (entertainment media), U.S.
- Sunil Mittal (telecommunication), India
- N. R. Narayana Murthy (information technology), India
- Nian Guangjiu (food), China
- Louis Odumegwu Ojukwu (transportation, manufacturing), Nigeria
- Qin Yinglin (agriculture), China
- Anita Roddick (retail), UK
- Michael J. Saylor (Internet), U.S.
- Magnús Scheving (entertainment, health), Iceland
- Carlos Slim (telecommunications), Mexico
- Alan Sugar (technology), UK
- J. R. D. Tata (steel, aviation, information technology, transportation, cosmetics, consumer products, education), France/India
- Ted Turner (entertainment media), U.S.
- Madam C.J. Walker (retail, philanthropy), U.S.
- Sam M. Walton (retail), US
- Oprah Winfrey (entertainment), U.S.
- Steve Wozniak (computers, technology, education, philanthropy), U.S.
- George Lucas (entertainment), U.S.
- Zhong Huijuan (pharmaceuticals), China

== 21st-century entrepreneurs ==
- Brian Acton (Internet), U.S.
- Ritesh Agarwal (Internet), India
- Bhavish Aggarwal (Internet), India
- Charles T. Akre (securities), U.S.
- Folorunso Alakija (fashion, oil and gas),
- Rod Aldridge (business process outsourcing, education), UK
- Pierre Andurand (investments), France
- Trishneet Arora (Cyber Security), India
- Sachin Bansal (Internet), India
- Eike Batista (mining, oil and gas exploration), Brazil
- Steve Baxter (Internet), Australia
- David Benaron (digital health), U.S.
- Jeff Bezos (Internet, space), U.S.
- Constantin Bisanz (Investor), U.S.
- Joe Blackman (events, entertainment), UK/U.S.
- Ryan Blair (multi-level marketing), U.S.
- Sara Blakely (retail), U.S.
- Hernán Botbol (Internet), Argentina
- Sergey Brin (Internet), U.S.
- Tory Burch (retail), U.S.
- Malcolm CasSelle (Internet), U.S./China
- Lee Chambers (psychologist) (healthcare), UK
- Sean "Diddy" Combs (music and entertainment), U.S.
- Simon Cowell (music and television), UK
- Nancy Cruickshank (Internet), UK
- Mark Cuban (Internet), U.S.
- Nick D'Aloisio (Internet), UK
- Aliko Dangote (manufacturing, real estate, oil and gas), Nigeria
- Jack Dorsey (Internet), U.S.
- Helmy Eltoukhy (genomics), U.S.
- Jason Erkes (Media, Internet), US
- Shawn Fanning (Internet), U.S.
- Rihanna (cosmetics), Barbados
- Dylan Field (Software), U.S.
- Jon Fisher (Internet), U.S.
- Simon Fuller (music and television), UK
- Roland Fomundam (sustainable technology in agriculture), Cameroon
- Peter Gilgan (construction), Canada
- Vishal Gondal (video gaming), India
- Reid Hoffman (Internet), U.S.
- Alex Hofmann (executive), U.S.
- Bri Holt (Internet), U.S.
- Drew Houston (Internet), U.S.
- Arianna Huffington (Internet), U.S.
- Steve Huffman (Internet), U.S.
- Jessica Huie (greeting cards), UK
- Mohammed Ibrahim (telecommunication), Sudan
- Daymond John (clothing), U.S.
- Lisa S. Jones (technology), U.S.
- Elle Kaplan (finance), U.S.
- David Karp (Internet), U.S.
- Sal Khan (education), U.S.
- Jan Koum (Internet), U.S.
- Dominik Mate Kovacs (technology entrepreneur), U.S.
- Prescott Lee (technology industry), U.S.
- Jeremy Levitt (Internet), Australia
- Jack Ma (Internet), China
- Ana Maiques (healthcare), Spain
- Fadi Makki (trade), Middle East (Lebanon, Qatar)
- Strive Masiyiwa (telecommunication), Zimbabwe
- Nick Matzorkis (technology, marketing, entertainment)
- Javier Moll (media), Spain/Australia
- Dave Morin (Internet), U.S.
- Rupert Murdoch (media, entertainment), UK/U.S.
- Elon Musk (Internet, space, energy, neurotechnology, transportation, infrastructure, artificial intelligence, electric cars), U.S./South Africa
- Carrie Rose (Internet), UK
- Andrew Nisbet (catering), UK
- Alexis Ohanian (Internet), U.S.
- Larry Page (Internet), U.S.
- Sean Parker (Internet), U.S.
- Melanie Perkins (Internet), Australia
- Stefano Pessina (healthcare), Italy
- Michelle Phan (Internet), U.S.
- Manny Phesto (music, cannabis/CBD), U.S.
- Azim Premji (information technology services), India
- Kelsey Ramsden (construction, children's toys), Canada
- Burton Rocks (Internet), U.S.
- Kevin Rose (Internet), U.S.
- Vijay Shekhar Sharma (Internet), India
- Param Singh (Internet, property), UK
- Masayoshi Son (Venture Capital), Japan
- Lane Sutton (Internet), U.S.
- Kevin Systrom (Internet), U.S.
- Motoaki Tanigo (Virtual Reality), Japan
- Rodrigo Teijeiro (Internet), Argentina/Brazil
- Tânia Tomé (Consultancy, Investment & training), Mozambique
- Wang Jianlin (real estate development), China
- Emily Weiss (beauty), U.S.
- Anne Wojcicki (personal genomics), U.S.
- Wu Yajun (property developer), China
- Malala Yousafzai (education), Pakistan
- Mark Zuckerberg (Internet), U.S.

== See also ==
- List of Indian entrepreneurs
- List of Internet entrepreneurs
- List of Japanese entrepreneurs
- List of Nigerian entrepreneurs
- List of social entrepreneurs
- List of Swedish entrepreneurs
- List of Turkish entrepreneurs
- List of Zambian entrepreneurs
