= Cruickshank =

Cruickshank (/ˈkrʊkʃæŋk/ KRUUK-shank) or Cruickshanks is a Scottish surname. Notable people with the surname include:

- Adrian Cruickshank (1936–2010), Australian politician
- Allan D. Cruickshank (1907–1974), American ornithologist and writer
- Alexander M. Cruickshank (1919–2017), American chemist
- Andrew Cruickshank (1907–1988), Scottish actor
- Art Cruickshank (1918–1983), American special effects artist
- Bobby Cruickshank (1894–1975), Scottish golfer
- Clare Cruickshank (died 2013), British cystic fibrosis sufferer
- Clive Cruickshanks (1908–1994), South African cricketer
- Dan Cruickshank (born 1949), British architectural historian and television presenter
- Daron Cruickshank (born 1985), MMA fighter
- Eveline Cruickshanks (1926–2021), historian
- Frank Cruickshank (1931–2015), Scottish football player
- George Cruickshank (disambiguation), several people
- Gord Cruickshank (1965–2021), Canadian ice hockey player
- Grahame Cruickshanks (1913–1941), South African cricketer and airman
- Harry Cruickshank Harley (1926–2014), Canadian politician
- Helen Cruickshank (1886–1975), Scottish poet and suffragette
- Helen G. Cruickshank (1902–1994), American nature writer and bird photographer
- James Cruickshank (printer) (fl. 1820s), Belizean printer
- Jamie Cruickshank (born 1986), Canadian bobsledder
- Jessi Cruickshank (born 1983), Canadian television personality
- Jim Cruickshank (1941–2010), Scottish football player
- Jim Cruickshank (bishop) (1936–2015), Canadian bishop
- Joanna Cruickshank (1875–1958), British founder of the RAF Nursing Service
- John Cruickshank (disambiguation), several people
- Jorge Cruickshank García (1915–1989), Mexican politician
- Kelvin Cruickshank, New Zealand psychic medium
- Mandy-Rae Cruickshank (born 1974), Canadian free diver
- Margaret Cruickshank (1873–1918), New Zealand medical practitioner
- Maria Cruickshank (born 1989), Spanish actress
- Martin Melvin Cruickshank (1888–1964), Scottish surgeon
- Nancy Cruickshank, British businesswoman
- Robert Cruickshank (disambiguation), several people
- Roger Cruickshank (born 1982), Scottish skier and RAF pilot
- Sheena Cruickshank, British immunologist
- Stephen Cruickshank (born 1983), Trinidadian soccer player
- Walter Cruickshank, American government official
- William Cruickshank (chemist) (died 1810), Scottish chemist and military surgeon

== See also ==
- Crookshank
- Cruikshank
- Cruickshank Botanic Garden, Aberdeen, Scotland
- Cruickshank, Ontario
- Paul Cruickshank Racing
- William Cruikshank (disambiguation)
