= List of fictional cats in film =

This list of fictional cats and other felines is subsidiary to the list of fictional cats. It is restricted solely to notable feline characters from notable live action, (or primarily live action) films. For characters that appear in several separate films, only the earliest film will be recorded here.

Character	Origin	Notes
Angus Scattergood	Rock Dog	An English Persian cat
Blanche	House	A little girl's pet white Persian cat with a long bushy tail who turns out to be a demon
Butch	The Incredible Shrinking Man	Played by Orangey.
Cat	Breakfast at Tiffany's	The cat actor, Orangey, also appeared in the films The Diary of Anne Frank and Rhubarb. Won the PATSY animal acting award in 1952 and 1962. He also guest starred in a Mission Impossible episode "The Seal" as IMF agent Rusty cat.
Cat Beast	9	A machine with the skull of a cat with the sole purpose of reactivating the Fabrication Machine from the 2009 film 9.
Church	Pet Sematary	A gray cat resurrected after being run over.
Clementine	Visit to a Small Planet	Played by Orangey and voiced by June Foray.
Cleopatra	The Comedy of Terrors	Played by Orangey.
Crookshanks	Harry Potter	A kneazle-domestic cat hybrid, belonging to Hermione Grainger. Rather large, very intelligent and fond of chasing gnomes.
Cosmic Creepers	Bedknobs and Broomsticks	Miss Eglantine Price's scruffy and slightly grumpy black cat.
DC	That Darn Cat!	A wily, adventurous Siamese tomcat who lives with two young women, suburbanite sisters Ingrid and Patti Randall, whose parents are traveling abroad at the time of the story.
Duck	Constantine	Angela's gray cat whom John Constantine uses to help cross over into hell.
Duffy	A Talking Cat!?!	The eponymous talking cat who helps the human characters with their lives. Played by Squeaky, voiced by Eric Roberts.
Fat Louie	The Princess Diaries	Mia's cat, played by four different cats - one of which belonged to the film's star, Anne Hathaway.
Filby	Primer	Aaron's cat. When missing, called by name by Aaron and Abe during the fountain scene. Filby is most likely named as a tribute to a minor character in the science fiction novel, The Time Machine, written by H.G. Wells in 1894.
Frodo	A Quiet Place: Day One	The third main character and important to the plot.
Goose	Captain Marvel	Orange tabby. The cat's name in the comics was Chewie
Hecate	Batman: The Movie	Appeared in the 1966 Batman movie as Catwoman's pet cat; Unknown if Hecate also appeared in 1960's Batman episode "The Purr-fect Crime/Better Luck Next time" as Catwoman's felonious feline pet (which is adopted by Bruce Wayne and Dick Grayson); This episode also featured a kitten sent to Police HQ by Catwoman.
Jake	The Cat from Outer Space	A cat-like alien. His real name is Zunar-J-5/9 Doric-4-7.
Jones	Alien and Aliens	Jones, or Jonesy, is a cat with orange fur who serves as mascot aboard the Nostromo. He and Ellen Ripley are the only survivors of their mission to planet LV-426. After Ripley saved Jonesy from the wreck of the Nostromo, he stays and sleeps with her when she is in hospital and, later, when she gets her own apartment. When Ripley must return to LV-426, she fondly curses him and says, "You're staying here".
Keanu	Keanu	Tabby kitten.
Kitty Galore	Cats & Dogs: The Revenge of Kitty Galore	Former M.E.O.W.S. agent Ivana Clawyu
Lucio	Ripley	A silent but eloquent witness to Ripley's crime.
Mrs. Norris	Harry Potter	A 'scrawny, dust-coloured creature with bulging, lamp-like eyes'. Devoted pet/accomplice of Hogwarts caretaker Argus Filch.
Mr. Bigglesworth	Austin Powers	A parody of Blofeld's cat from James Bond films.
Mr. Tinkles	Cats & Dogs; Cats & Dogs: The Revenge of Kitty Galore	An evil snow-white cat planning to sabotage the efforts of Professor Brody to discover a cure for human allergies to dogs.
Mr. Jinx	Meet the Parents	Played by two five-year-old Himalayan cats named Bailey and Misha. The American Humane Association oversaw the filming of all scenes where the cats were used and ensured the animals' obedience and well-being by keeping two trainers and a veterinarian on set at all times.
Milo	The Adventures of Milo and Otis	Ginger kitten
Mischief	Fly Me to the Moon	Black cat that roams the grounds at a NASA launch facility, creating fear of the bad luck omen it represents.
Morris the Cat	The Long Goodbye and Shamus	Advertising cat best known as finicky cat Morris of 9 Lives cat food
Mouschi	The Diary of Anne Frank	Played by Orangey.
Napoleon	Mrs. Miniver	The Miniver family's cat
Neutron	This Island Earth	Played by Orangey.
Cat	Breakfast at Tiffany's	The cat actor, Orangey, also appeared in the movies The Diary of Anne Frank and Rhubarb. Won the PATSY animal acting award in 1952 and 1962. He also guest starred in a Mission Impossible episode "The Seal" as IMF agent Rusty cat.
Orion	Men in Black	Orange and white cat who carries an entire galaxy in his collar (referred to as Orion's belt)
Pyewacket	Bell, Book and Candle	Siamese cat and familiar of Gillian Holroyd (Kim Novak), who is a witch
Rhubarb	Rhubarb	Played by 14 different cats, including Orangey.
Rroû	A Cat's Life	Original French title: Mon chat et moi, la grande aventure de Rroû (lit. 'My Cat and Me, the Great Adventure of Rroû'). It is a film adaptation of the 1931 novel Rroû by Maurice Genevoix. In the English dub released in 2024, Rroû the cat is renamed Lou.
Salem Saberhagen	Sabrina the Teenage Witch	Former warlock imprisoned in the form of a black shorthair cat that can communicate with humans.
Sassy	Homeward Bound: The Incredible Journey	A Himalayan voiced by Sally Field. The film was a remake of The Incredible Journey which featured a Siamese cat and named Tao.
Sergeant Tibbs	One Hundred and One Dalmatians	The unsung hero who helps the puppies escape from De Vil Manor. He is voiced by David Frankham.
Snowbell	Stuart Little	The pet Persian cat voiced by Nathan Lane later Kevin Schon white cat of the Little family who gradually warms up to Stuart voiced by Michael J Fox.
Smarf	Too Many Cooks	An anthropomorphic cat puppet used in the short, a parody of various other puppets used in sitcoms.
Spot	Star Trek Generations	Data's cat seen in Star Trek: The Next Generation and Star Trek Generations
Stray cat	The Girl with the Dragon Tattoo	Tabby cat who visits the Swedish dwelling where Mikael Blomkvist is staying while doing research.
Sweetie	The Fifth Element	A white cat who lives with Korben Dallas in his apartment in New York City.
Tabitha	The Shadow of the Cat	A house cat sees her mistress murdered by two servants under orders from her husband and becomes ferociously bent on revenge.
Tad Lazenby	Cats & Dogs: The Revenge of Kitty Galore	Black bowtie wearing Tuxedo cat head of "M.E.O.W.S." Homage to James Bond 007; voiced by Roger Moore; his name is a spoof of James Bond actor George Lazenby.
Thackery Binx	Hocus Pocus	The Sanderson sisters (Winifred, Sarah, and Mary) turned Thackery Binx into a cat when he tried to save his sister from them. He remains a cat for most of the film until the spell is broken at the end.
The Cat	A Girl Walks Home Alone at Night	Plays an important role in the plot. Played by Masuka.
Thomasina	The Three Lives of Thomasina	A cat who is reincarnated twice after death and grows closer to Lori and Mr. McDhui.
Tonto	Harry and Tonto	
Turkish Angora Cat	James Bond films, 1962–present	Sidekick pet of Ernst Stavro Blofeld; appeared in movies Dr. No, From Russia with Love, Thunderball {and its 1983 remake Never Say Never Again}; You Only Live Twice; On Her Majesty's Secret Service, and Diamonds Are Forever. In For Your Eyes Only, appeared as trademark sidekick of unnamed villain implied to be Blofeld. A similar cat appears in Spectre where Bond is tortured. Spoofed in Austin Powers: International Man of Mystery and its sequels, as Dr. Evil's pet Mr. Bigglesworth and Mini Me's pet Mini Mr. Bigglesworth; in a Powerpuff Girls cartoon, as Mr. Tinkles; and in movies Cats & Dogs and Cats & Dogs: The Revenge of Kitty Galore
Ulysses	Inside Llewyn Davis	Orange tabby.
Unnamed	And Then There Were None	American shorthair appears throughout the film, taking its customary position on the lap of the villain, Judge Francis J. Quincanon, played by Barry Fitzgerald, shortly before the Judge dies in the penultimate scene of the movie
Walter	Chevy Silverado LT 1500	Silver domestic shorthair tabby cat (with five doubles) appears in three commercials with John Hoogenakker and Chris Pratt -"Cat" in summer 2021 and "Walter in Winter" in 2022. Aired during the 2021 Olympics and 2021-2022 NFL championship games..

== See also ==
- List of fictional felines
- List of fictional big cats
