= Cruikshank =

Cruikshank (/ˈkrʊkʃæŋk/ KRUUK-shank) is a surname of Scottish origin, and is a spelling variation of Cruickshank. Notable people with the surname include:

- Andrew Cruikshank (1820–1859), Australian politician
- Brad Cruikshank (born 1979), Canadian ice hockey player
- Chester Cruikshank (1913–1970), American athlete
- Dale Cruikshank, American astronomer
- Dan Cruikshank (born 1949), architectural historian and broadcaster
- Dane Cruikshank (born 1995), American football player
- George Cruikshank (1792–1878), English caricaturist
- Holly Cruikshank (born 1973), American dancer
- Isaac Cruikshank (1756–1811), Scottish painter and caricaturist
- Isaac Robert Cruikshank (1789–1856), caricaturist, illustrator and portrait miniaturist
- Lucas Cruikshank (born 1993), web producer and creator of Fred
- Marcus Henderson Cruikshank (1826–1881), Confederate States of America politician
- Margaret Cruikshank (born 1940), American feminist writer and scholar
- Margaret Mordecai Jones Cruikshank (1878–1955), American academic administrator and teacher
- Robert Edward Cruickshank (1888–1961), Anglo-Canadian soldier, Victoria Cross recipient
- Sally Cruikshank (born 1949), American cartoonist and animator
- Thomas H. Cruikshank, American businessman
- William Cruikshank (disambiguation), several people

== See also ==
- Crookshank
- Cruickshank
- 3531 Cruikshank, main-belt asteroid
- United States v. Cruikshank, 1876 US Supreme Court decision
