= Mrs Norris =

Mrs Norris may refer to:

- A cat character in the Harry Potter series
- A supporting character in the novel Mansfield Park

== See also ==
- Norris (surname)
