= Huie =

Huie is a surname. Notable people with the surname include:

- Albert Huie (1920–2010), Jamaican painter
- Alexander Huie (1869–1964), Australian journalist
- Janice Riggle Huie (born 1946), American United Methodist bishop
- Jessica Huie (born 1980), British businesswoman
- Oliver Huie (1897–1951), American football coach
- Richard Huie (1795-1867) Scottish physician
- Shirley Fenton Huie (1924-2016), Australian writer
- William Bradford Huie (1910–1986), American journalist and writer
