= George Cruickshank =

George Cruickshank may refer to:

- George Cruikshank (1792–1878), British caricaturist and book illustrator
- George Cruickshank (Australian politician) (1853–1904), Australian politician
- George Cruikshank (editor) (1857–1936), American newspaper editor
- George Edward Cruickshank (1877–1962), Alberta politician
- George Cruickshank (bishop) (1881–1951), seventh Bishop of Waiapu
- George Cruickshank (Canadian politician) (1897–1970), Canadian politician
