= Jorge Cruickshank García =

Mexican politician

Member of the Senate of Mexico
- In office 1976–1982

Member of the Chamber of Deputies
- In office 1964–1967
- In office 1982–1989

Personal details
- Born: 29 July 1911 Tehuantepec, Oaxaca, Mexico
- Died: 17 January 1989 (aged 77)
- Party: Popular Socialist Party
- Occupation: Politician

Jorge Cruickshank García (Note: In this Mexican name, the surname is Cruickshank and the second or maternal family name is García.) (29 July 1911 – 17 January 1989) was a Mexican politician. He was the general secretary of the Popular Socialist Party (PPS) and a five-time parliamentarian.

== Early life and activism ==
Jorge Cruickshank was born in Tehuantepec in the state of Oaxaca. He attended primary and secondary education in Veracruz. He continued his studies in the city and obtained engineering and secondary teaching degrees. He became active in the communist youth movement, and between 1939 and 1940 was a national leader of the Communist Youth. He was also a trade union organizer. He took part in the founding of the National Education Workers' Union (SNTE), and became the general secretary of SNTE local 10 in 1943. He later held various positions in the SNTE national organization.

== In the PPS ==
In 1948 he took part in founding the Popular Party (which later became the Popular Socialist Party, PPS). He was a Popular Party candidate for parliament in the 1949 election. In 1958 he again stood for parliament. In 1960 he was included in the Central Committee of the party (a position he would hold until 1982). He was the PPS Secretary for International Relations during 1962–1963. 1963-1965 he served as Secretary of Press and Publicity of the party 1963-1965 and Secretary of Organization 1965–1968. In 1968 he was the PPS candidate for governor of Oaxaca.

== General secretary ==
Cruickshank was elected general secretary of PPS at the fourth national assembly of the party in January 1969. His candidature was opposed by a group of former Mexican Worker-Peasant Party (POCM) leaders, who were expelled at the meeting.

Cruickshank García served as PPS general secretary in 1969–1979 and 1979–1981.

== Parliamentarian ==
In 1964 he was elected to the Chamber of Deputies (as a PPS party deputy assigned to Oaxaca's 1st district). His tenure lasted until 1967. In parliament, he formed part in committees on culture, railroads and communications. In 1970 he was re-elected to Congress for the 1970–1973 period, as a party deputy.

In 1976 he was elected to the Senate from Oaxaca. He became the first senator not to come from the Institutional Revolutionary Party (PRI) since the consolidation of that party's rule in 1929, but he ran in coalition with the PRI, and therefore was not an opposition senator. He was elected unopposed; it was speculated at the time that PRI had supported Cruickshank García's candidacy in return for the acceptance of the PPS to concede defeat in the 1975 Nayarit gubernatorial election (it was believed that PPS had won the governor's post in Nayarit, but lost it to the PRI's Rogelio Flores Curiel due to fraud). It would take until 1988 before actual opposition politicians would be elected to the Senate.

Cruickshank's senatorial tenure lasted until 1982. In that year he was re-elected to a plurinominal seat in the lower house of Congress. He became the coordinator of the parliamentary faction of the PPS. He was re-elected in 1988.

Cruickshank García died on 17 January 1989.
