= Crookshank =

Crookshank or Crookshanks is a surname. Notable people with the surname include:

- Angus Crookshank (born 1999), Canadian ice hockey player
- Anne Crookshank (1927–2016), Irish art historian
- Chichester Crookshank (1868–1958), British Army officer and politician
- Edgar Crookshank (1858–1928), English physician and microbiologist
- Eric Crookshank (born 1978), American basketball player
- Francis Graham Crookshank (1873–1933), British physician and author
- George Crookshank (1680–1751), Irish politician
- Harry Crookshank (1893–1961), British politician
- Henry Crookshank (1893–1972), Irish geologist
- John Crookshanks (1708–1795), Royal Navy officer
- Sydney Crookshank (1870–1941), British military engineer

== See also ==
- Crookshanks, a cat in the Harry Potter series
- Cruikshank
- Cruickshank
