= Grahame Cruickshanks =

South African cricketer

Personal information
- Full name: Grahame Lawrence Cruickshanks
- Born: 2 March 1913; Port Elizabeth, Eastern Cape Province
- Died: 8 September 1941 (aged 28); Berlin, Germany
- Batting: Left-handed
- Role: Batsman, wicket-keeper
- Relatives: Clive Cruickshanks (brother)

Domestic team information
- Years: Team
- 1931/32: Eastern Province
- 1935–1938: Egypt
- 1939: Royal Air Force
- FC debut: 21 December 1931 Eastern Province v Natal
- Last FC: 23 December 1931 Eastern Province v Orange Free State

Career statistics
| Competition | First-class |
|---|---|
| Matches | 2 |
| Runs scored | 27 |
| Batting average | 6.75 |
| 100s/50s | 0/0 |
| Top score | 19 |
| Catches/stumpings | 1/– |
- Source: CricketArchive, 7 June 2008

Grahame Lawrence Cruickshanks DFC (2 March 1913 – 8 September 1941) was a South African cricketer and airman. A left-handed batsman and occasional wicket-keeper, he played first-class cricket for Eastern Province and whilst serving in the military in the mid-1930s for Egypt in five matches. He was killed on active service in the Royal Air Force during World War II.

== Biography ==
Cruickshanks was born in Port Elizabeth, Eastern Cape Province in 1913, the youngest son of Alexander and Agnes Cruickshanks. His brother Clive Cruickshanks also played cricket for Eastern Province. He was educated at Grey High School in Port Elizabeth, playing cricket and football for the school's teams.

Cruickshanks played his only two first-class matches in December 1931, playing for Eastern Province in Currie Cup matches against Natal and Orange Free State, scoring a total of 27 runs with a highest score of 19. He played five times for Egypt against HM Martineau's XI between 1935 and 1938 whilst serving in the military, (Note: Martineau organised tours of Egypt by teams "largely consisting of first-class players" each year between 1929 and 1939.) (Note: He is also almost certainly the Cruickshanks listed as keeping wicket against Martineau's XI United Services and RAF XIs in 1936 and 1937 and for Maadi Sports Club in the later year.) and played for the RAF team, including twice in inter-service matches, during 1939, top-scoring in both innings against the Royal Navy at Lord's with scores of 90―run out "rather stupidly", according to The Times―and then 70 not out.

His Wisden obituary described him as a "powerful left-handed batsman and sound wicket-keeper", whilst match reports in The Times commented on his willingness to "make ground with his feet" to score boundaries and that he hit the ball hard. He married Phyllis "Billie" Austin during the late 1930s; the couple had one son, born in Egypt.

== Military service and death ==
Cruickshanks worked for Shell Petroleum in South Africa before travelling to England to join the Royal Air Force in 1933. After serving with 14 Squadron in Transjordan and Egypt for the period, he trained South African and Rhodesian air crew during the early years of World War II. He served in 9 Squadron and was appointed Acting Squadron Leader in September 1940, before moving to lead 214 (Federated Malay States) Squadron flying Wellington bombers in August 1941.

Cruickshanks died when the Wellington he was flying was shot down over Berlin in September 1941 aged 28. (Note: Cruickshanks was originally reported as missing in action, and his death was not confirmed until December.) At the time of his death he held the rank of Acting Wing Commander based at RAF Stradishall in Suffolk. He is buried in the Commonwealth War Graves cemetery in the city. In July 1942 he was posthumously awarded the Distinguished Flying Cross.
