= PodProperty =

Online legal service provider

PodProperty Pty Ltd
- Type: Private
- Industry: Co-Ownership Services
- Founded: April 2006
- Founder: Jeremy Levitt; Jonathan Stambolis
- Headquarters: Sydney, Australia
- Products: Co-Ownership Guide
- Services: Co-Ownership Agreements
- Website: podproperty.com.au

PodProperty is an Australian online legal service provider that specializes in co-ownership agreements for tenants in common.

== History ==
Jeremy Levitt and Jonathan Stambolis co-founded PodProperty in April 2006. Stambolis is a director of PodProperty, and Levitt is the company's chief executive officer (CEO). The business is built around the legal arrangement of co-ownership of houses, apartments or real estate in Australia. The company was established during Australia's housing affordability crisis when there were soaring property prices and rising interest rates on home mortgages.

It was reported in November 2006 (six months after PodProperty was established) that the company was receiving 30-40 enquiries a day for its co-ownership guide. In June 2007, PodProperty made a submission to the New Zealand Parliament Commerce Select Committee Inquiry into Housing Affordability in New Zealand. Its submission "focuses on shared equity schemes and, in particular, co-ownership as a means of improving the affordability of housing in New Zealand, based on the success of this initiative in Australia". The company said in a report in February 2010 that the estimated number of people it has assisted with their co-ownership plans grew 51 percent and it attributed the growth to the effects of the 2008 financial crisis and people wanting to spread mortgage risk.

== Services ==
PodProperty facilitates co-ownership agreements and offers legal advice for individuals interested in purchasing property together as tenants in common. Their Co-Ownership Agreement caters to various relationships, including friends, family members, and de facto partners, allowing them to address property-related matters. The company provides a free Co-Ownership Guide and also offers a service to assist homeowners and real estate investors in selling part of their investments. They charge for their co-ownership agreements, with fees based on a "per person" basis.

== Partnership ==
PodProperty has a strategic partnership with the Commonwealth Bank and Mortgage Choice which has PodProperty listed as their preferred source of co-ownership agreements. It launched a co-ownership initiative with Wizard Home Loans in 2007 to provide specialised services for single first home buyers looking to purchase property together.

In 2007, PodProperty organised the co-ownership of a holiday property in Queensland involving five Australian couples living in Indonesia, the Northern Territory and Victoria and assisted another group to buy in Niseko, Japan. They arranged a co-ownership agreement for two friends who pooled their deposits to buy an apartment in Surry Hills in 2008. The company also assisted a brother and sister in 2008 to buy an apartment in Sydney's North Bondi and helped them to look for a second one too. In 2013, PodProperty drew up a co-ownership agreement for the sales of a five-bedroom house in Cottage Point waterfront on Sydney's Pittwater.

== Recognition ==
The company's chief executive officer (CEO), Jeremy Levitt, was nominated as a 2007 SmartCompany Idol.

== See also ==
- Concurrent estate
