= Alex Hofmann (executive) =

German American entrepreneur and investor

- Occupations: entrepreneur and investor
- Known for: musical.ly, live.ly, 9count
- Awards: Billboard's Digital Power Players; WSJ Innovator Award

Alex Hofmann is a German-American entrepreneur and investor. He is the former CEO of musical.ly, as well as the founder of the technology company 9count, the parent company of notable social media apps like Summer (formerly Spark) and Wink.

== Background ==
Hofmann was born and grew up in Germany. Hofmann worked at the enterprise software company SAP, where he held the position of director of marketing and product management in the San Francisco Bay Area.

Musical.ly

In May 2015, Hofmann joined musical.ly in the U.S. as CEO. He led the company's U.S. operations as musical.ly expanded its user base and presence in the music and entertainment industries.

In 2016, musical.ly launched live.ly, a standalone livestreaming app linked to the musical.ly platform. The company also developed partnerships with artists, record labels, publishers and media companies.

In 2017, musical.ly announced a partnership with Apple Music that allowed subscribers to listen to full songs within the app. The company also expanded into professionally produced content through partnerships with media companies including Viacom, NBCUniversal and Hearst.

ByteDance acquired musical.ly in November 2017 in a deal reported to be worth as much as $1 billion. Hofmann left the company in January 2018 following the acquisition. Musical.ly was later merged into TikTok in August 2018.

=== 9count ===
In 2019, Hofmann and Joe Viola co-founded 9count, a consumer social-app company based in Marina del Rey, California. The company operated a portfolio of social applications, including Wink, Summer (formerly Spark), Popstream, Juju and Everland.

In August 2022, TechCrunch reported that 9count's portfolio had more than 16 million cumulative downloads, according to data from Sensor Tower. Wink had more than 15 million lifetime downloads and more than two million monthly active users. The company had raised $27.5 million in funding from investors including Crosscut, GGV Capital Redpoint, Signia, Greycroft, Progression, I2BF and Waverley Capital.

9count pursued a multi-product strategy, developing separate applications for different types of social interaction rather than focusing on a single platform.

In 2022, 9count was included in The Information's list of the 50 Most Promising Startups, where it ranked second in the Consumer & Creator category.

In September 2024, 9count acquired Lex, a social network focused on LGBTQ+ users. TechCrunch reported that Lex had been downloaded more than one million times. Hofmann said the acquisition was consistent with 9count's strategy of operating social networks focused on specific communities. The terms of the acquisition were not disclosed.

== Awards and recognition ==
Hofmann was recognized in Billboard's 2017 Digital Power Players list, acknowledging his influence in the music and tech industries. In the same year, Hofmann received the WSJ Innovator Award for his contributions to innovation in social media.
