= Orangey =

Cat actor

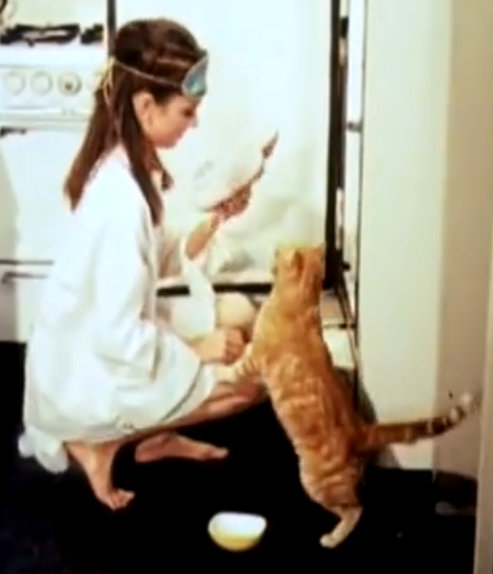
- Orangey with Audrey Hepburn in Breakfast at Tiffany's (1961)
- Other names: Jimmy; Jeremy; Rhubarb
- Species: Felis catus
- Born: United States
- Occupation: Actor
- Notable role: Rhubarb; Cat; Butch
- Years active: 1950s–1960s
- Owner: Frank Inn
- Awards: PATSY Award (1951, 1961)

Orangey was a name used by multiple male red domestic shorthair tabby cats which served as animal actors in motion pictures. While portrayed as a single cat in early studio publicity and news accounts, the cats' owner and trainer Frank Inn has stated that the original Orangey died prior to his first role and was actually multiple cats.

== Career ==
Orangey, publicized as a single cat with multiple stand-ins, had a career in film and television in the 1950s and early 1960s. He is the only cat to win two PATSY Awards, the first for the title role in Rhubarb (1951) and the second for his role in Breakfast at Tiffany's (1961). The cat was also credited as "Jimmy", "Jeremy", and "Rhubarb".

A 1951 article in the San Francisco Chronicle stated that Orangey was found after he wandered into the Sherman Oaks, California home of a homemaker named Agnes Murray in 1948. Murray fed him and nursed his bad leg back to health. After reading that the producers of Rhubarb were seeking a "Jimmy Cagney kind of cat", Murray phoned the studio and set up an interview. Orangey was selected out of 5000 cats.

According to an Associated Press article in 1951, Frank Inn called cats harder to handle than coyotes. The article refers to Orangey as "Orangey Murray". Inn said: "At least you can train a coyote to do tricks and he'll do them. You can never tell about cats." Inn said that cats do not respond to a trainer's voice or hand gestures, and that the only way to get them to do things was by repetition. Inn said that Orangey had a dozen stand-ins, and that he received the finest food and veterinary attention every other day. He said that animal welfare officers supervised the sets to check on working conditions and had vetoed cat-dog fights.

According to Sam Wasson, author of 5th Avenue, 5AM: Audrey Hepburn, Breakfast at Tiffany's, and the Dawn of the Modern Woman, Inn said Orangey was "a real New York type cat, just what we want. In no time at all I'm going to make a method, or Lee Strasberg type, cat out of him". Often scratching and biting actors, Orangey was called "the world's meanest cat" by one studio executive, but he was prized for his ability to stay for several hours. He would sometimes flee after filming scenes, and production would be shut down until he could be found. Inn would sometimes have to post guard dogs at the studio entrance to keep him from running away.

In a 2001 interview with the Television Academy Foundation, Inn stated that the early publicity on Orangey was encouraged by the studio, which liked the "beautiful" origin story, but that the original Orangey died prior to the making of Rhubarb. In the film, the cat character was portrayed by multiple orange cats. Inn stated that he purchased Orangey from the original owners for $25.

For Breakfast at Tiffany's, Orangey won the 1962 PATSY Award for his portrayal of "the poor slob without a name". He was also credited as the cat Mouschi in the film adaptation of The Diary of Anne Frank (1959). On The Dick Van Dyke Show he portrayed Sally's cat, Mr. Henderson, in "Where you been, Fassbinder?" on March 14, 1962. On the sitcom The Beverly Hillbillies, Orangey is credited as Rusty in the 1963 episode "Elly's Animals" and was uncredited as Matilda Cat in "The Cat Burglar" in 1966.

Sofia Bohdanowicz's 2020 short documentary film, The Hardest Working Cat in Show Biz is based on Dan Sallitt's essay of the same name, and explores Orangey's history, mythology, and rumors that the name "Orangey" was ascribed to several different cats as opposed to one single cat.

== Filmography ==
List of film credits
Title	Year	Role	Notes	Ref.
Rhubarb	1951	Rhubarb	Uncredited, one of 14 cats in the role	
This Island Earth	1955	Neutron	Uncredited	
The Incredible Shrinking Man	1957	Butch	Uncredited	
The Matchmaker	1958	Himself - a Cat	Credited as Rhubarb	
The Diary of Anne Frank	1959	Mouschi	Uncredited	
Visit to a Small Planet	1960	Clementine	Uncredited	
Breakfast at Tiffany's	1961	Cat	Frank Inn also credited	
Gigot	1962		Uncredited	
The Comedy of Terrors	1963	Cleopatra	Credited as Rhubarb	
Village of the Giants	1965	Giant Cat	Uncredited	

Television

- Gilligan's Island Cat
- Our Miss Brooks (1952–1956) as Minerva (uncredited)
- Alfred Hitchcock Presents (January 22, 1956) (Season 1 Episode 17: "The Older Sister") as Cat (uncredited)
- Alfred Hitchcock Presents (December 22, 1957) (Season 3 Episode 12: "Miss Paisley's Cat") as Stanley the cat (uncredited)
- Shirley Temple's Storybook (1958) as The Cat
- The Dick Van Dyke Show (1962) as Mr. Henderson
- The Beverly Hillbillies (1963) as Rusty, Cat
- The Many Loves of Dobie Gillis Cat (Season 2 episode 10 Jingle Bells)
- My Favorite Martian (1963–1964) as Herbie, Max the Cat, Cat on Footpath
- Mission Impossible ("The Seal", 1967) as IMF agent Rusty the cat (uncredited)
- Batman (1967–1968) as Cat

Documentary

- Audrey Hepburn Remembered (1993) as Cat

== Awards ==
Year	Nominated work	Category	Awards	Result
1952	Rhubarb	Picture Animal Top Star of the Year	PATSY Award	Won
1962	Breakfast at Tiffany's	Picture Animal Top Star of the Year	PATSY Award	Won

== See also ==
- List of individual cats
