= The Comedy of Terrors =

1963 American horror comedy film by Jacques Tourneur

- US film poster by Reynold Brown
- Directed by: Jacques Tourneur
- Screenplay by: Richard Matheson
- Produced by: James H. Nicholson; Samuel Z. Arkoff
- Starring: Vincent Price; Peter Lorre; Boris Karloff; Joyce Jameson; Rhubarb; Joe E. Brown; Basil Rathbone
- Cinematography: Floyd Crosby
- Edited by: Anthony Carras
- Music by: Les Baxter
- Production company: Alta Vista Productions
- Distributed by: American International Pictures
- Release dates: December 25, 1963 (Detroit); January 22, 1964
- Running time: 84 minutes
- Country: United States
- Language: English

The Comedy of Terrors is a 1963 American International Pictures (AIP) horror comedy film directed by Jacques Tourneur and starring Vincent Price, Peter Lorre (in his final film released before his death), Basil Rathbone, Boris Karloff and Joe E. Brown (in a cameo performance that also serves as his final film appearance). It is a blend of comedy and horror that features several cast members from Tales of Terror, a 1962 film also released by AIP.

The film is set in a New England town named after the region of Gilead. The corrupt owner of a funeral parlor murders clients to increase his business and tries to bury his landlord alive.

== Plot ==
In the New England town of New Gilead during the late 19th century, unscrupulous drunkard Waldo Trumbull runs a funeral parlor that he acquired from his former business partner Amos Hinchley. Trumbull is unhappily married to Hinchley's daughter Amaryllis.

Trumbull enlists fugitive picklock Felix Gillie as his assistant. They repeatedly reuse the firm's only coffin to save money and murder wealthy residents to increase business. Trumbull is abusive to Amaryllis while unsuccessfully trying to poison her senile father to hasten an inheritance, by telling him the poison is his medicine. Gillie is in love with Amaryllis and ineptly tries to seduce her, but she remains faithful to Trumbull, who wastes money on alcohol while his business is dwindling.

When threatened with eviction by his landlord John F. Black for overdue rent, Trumbull murders a wealthy shipping magnate and offers the heirs funeral services. However, following the funeral the magnate's wife absconds with her husband's fortune without paying Trumbull's fees.

After a final demand for the rent, Trumbull sends Gillie to murder Black. Gillie flees when he finds Black awake and haphazardly swinging a sword while reciting texts by William Shakespeare, but Black is startled and suffers a heart attack. A physician pronounces him dead, despite a servant's warning him that Black has previously suffered bouts of death-like sleep.

Trumbull and Gillie transport Black to the mortuary, where Amaryllis' cat Cleopatra awakens Black. They prevent him from escaping, but Black suffers another heart attack. While returning him to the coffin, Black revives and Trumbull knocks him unconscious. The funeral proceeds without anyone else aware that Black is alive, and he is placed in his family crypt.

Trumbull gets drunk and counts his profits from the funeral. Following another of Gillie's crude seductions, Amaryllis tries to attract Trumbull's attention but is rebuffed. She relents and decides to run off with Gillie. Black awakes, escapes his tomb, enters the parlor, and grabs an axe. Amaryllis faints. Black chases Trumbull and Gillie around the house. Gillie falls down a flight of stairs and is rendered unconscious. Trumbull shoots Black, who delivers a final Shakespearean monologue before dying.

Amaryllis awakens and thinks that Gillie is dead by Trumbull's hand. She threatens to call the police and Trumbull strangles her. Gillie awakens and, after Trumbull claims credit for murdering Amaryllis, attacks Trumbull with a sword. Trumbull strikes him down with a poker. Black's servant arrives, sees the chaos and informs the police.

Trumbull collapses to the floor from exhaustion. Amaryllis and Gillie revive and run off together. Hinchley, who slept through the commotion, tries to revive Trumbull with a vial of his "medicine". Trumbull realizes that he has drunk his own poison and drops dead. Cleopatra walks over to Black, who has an allergic reaction to her.

== Cast ==
- Vincent Price as Waldo Trumbull
- Peter Lorre as Felix Gillie
- Boris Karloff as Amos Hinchley
- Basil Rathbone as John F. Black, Esq.
- Joyce Jameson as Amaryllis Trumbull
- Joe E. Brown as the Cemetery Keeper
- Beverly Powers (credited as Beverly Hills) as Mrs. Phipps
- Alan DeWitt as Riggs
- Buddy Mason as Mr. Phipps
- Douglas Williams as the Doctor
- Linda Rogers as Phipps' Maid
- Luree Holmes as Black's Servant
- Rhubarb the cat as Cleopatra

== Production ==
The film was a follow-up to The Raven, meant to reunite Vincent Price, Peter Lorre and Boris Karloff. The producers' original intention was for Karloff to play the part of Mr. Black, but by the time production was set to begin, they realized that Karloff could not meet the physical requirements of the role, as he suffered from persistent back and leg problems. Karloff traded roles with Basil Rathbone and played Mr. Hinchley.

Screenplay writer Richard Matheson later said that he was "proud of that picture and of the fact that I got AIP [American International Pictures] to hire Tourneur. Earlier on, I had asked for Tourneur on one of my Twilight Zones ... They said, 'Well, he's a movie director. I don't think he can handle this time schedule ...'. As I recall, he did the shortest shooting schedule of anyone—twenty-eight hours. He had this book with every shot in it and detailed notes. He knew exactly what he was doing every inch of the way. He was so organized."

Tourneur said he saw the film as "a cynical, cynical comedy, a little bit in the old René Clair tradition."

Matheson called the film his "happiest experience set-wise" while working at AIP mostly because he enjoyed working with the actors "who all loved the script". He was billed as 'associate producer' but says he "did nothing in capacity as producer".

In the original draft all the main characters died but AIP asked Matheson to rewrite it so Lorre and Jameson ended up together.

== Proposed sequel ==
Matheson wanted to write a sequel film for AIP called Sweethearts and Horrors, with the same four stars in various roles—Price as a ventriloquist, Karloff as a children's TV host, Rathbone as a musical comedy star and Lorre as a magician—and starring Tallulah Bankhead as well. However, this plan was abandoned after Comedy of Terrors failed to perform well at the box office. Comedy of Terrors turned out to be the last film script Matheson wrote for AIP although he wrote several that were not filmed including the aforementioned Sweethearts and Horror and When Sleeper Wakes.

== Reception ==
=== Box office ===
The film was not a great success at the box office. Matheson said:

It didn't lose any money. They [AIP] told me that the title itself cost them a lot. It's such a contradiction in terms, though. Terror sells and comedy makes them go away, so it's like they're walking in two directions at once. But I thought it was very clever to do a take off of Shakespeare's Comedy of Errors. ... I think they were probably sorry they didn't use a Poe title, because Poe had a certain marketability. I guess they couldn't figure out how to market it. But it was the last one because I was getting tired of writing about people being buried alive, so I decided to make a joke about it.

Tourneur said Roger Corman's Poe films "are adapted to young people, children—they're not for adults. Ours was extremely adult.... [O]ur film was deliberately aimed at the mature thinking people who appreciate satire, who appreciate cynical humor—therefore it was completely lost on the kids who were looking for horror and they didn't get it."

=== Critical reception ===
The Comedy of Terrors received mixed to negative reviews upon its initial release. Howard Thompson of The New York Times wrote a scathing review, calling it a "musty, rusty bag of tricks rigged as a horror farce." Variety wrote that the film "leaves much to be desired. The raw material for a jovial spoof of chillers was there, but the comic restraint and perception necessary to capitalize on those natural resources is conspicuously missing." Philip K. Scheuer of the Los Angeles Times panned the film as "a series of predictable gags repeated ad infinitum, ad nauseum [sic] ... I felt ashamed to watch once reputable actors hamming it up all over the place, making a mockery of whatever is left of their poor images." The Monthly Film Bulletin was somewhat positive, calling Price and Lorre "both splendid" and writing that Matheson's script "avoids the laxness which slowed down passages of The Raven, and constructs a soundly worked-out mechanism based on a minimum of running gags."

== Novelization ==
A novelization of The Comedy of Terrors was written in 1964 by Elsie Lee, adapted from Richard Matheson's screenplay. It was published by Lancer Books in paperback (with changes to the story's ending).

== See also ==
- List of American films of 1963

== Notes ==
- Martin, Mick (Spring 1974). "Matheson: A Name to Conjure". Cinefantastique. Vol. 3, no. 4. pp. 7–19.
