= Robert Cruickshank =

Robert Cruickshank may refer to:

- Bobby Cruickshank (1894–1975), Scottish golfer
- Robert Edward Cruickshank (1888–1961), Canadian Victoria Cross recipient
- Robert Cruickshank (sailor) (born 1963), British sailor
- Robert Cruickshank (Australian politician) (1878–1928)
- Robert Cruickshank (bacteriologist) (1899–1974)
