= John Cruickshank (disambiguation) =

John Cruickshank (1920–2025) was a Scottish banker, Royal Air Force officer and a Second World War recipient of the Victoria Cross.

John Cruickshank may also refer to:

- John Cruickshank (mathematician) (1787–1875), Scottish mathematician
- John Cruickshank (literary scholar) (1924–1995), Irish scholar of French literature, language, and culture and World War II cryptologist
- John D. Cruickshank (born c. 1953), Canadian newspaper publisher and (since 2017) Canadian Consul-General in Chicago
