= Marcus Henderson Cruikshank =

American politician and lawyer (1826–1881)

Member of the Confederate States House of Representatives from Alabama's 4th district
- In office 1864 – March 1865
- Preceded by: Jabez L. M. Curry
- Succeeded by: Office abolished

Personal details
- Born: December 12, 1826 Autauga County, Alabama, US
- Died: October 10, 1881 (aged 54) Talladega, Alabama, US
- Party: Whig
- Relations: Charles McDowell (grandfather-in-law)
- Children: George Cruikshank
- Occupation: Politician, lawyer

Marcus Henderson Cruikshank (Note: Pronounced "KROOK-shank".) (December 12, 1826 – October 10, 1881) was an American politician and lawyer. He was a member of the Confederate States House of Representatives from Alabama.

== Early life ==
Cruikshank was born on December 12, 1826, in Autauga County, Alabama, though a newspaper gives his birthdate as September 26. He was the son Scottish parents, his mother being a Mrs. McNeil. He attended common schools. He grew up around the Muscogee, with him playing a role in the creation of a glossary of the Muscogee language.

== Career ==
Cruikshank read law under White & Parsons, joining the partnership in 1847. He was the register of Talladega County's court of equity, and in 1850, was the mayor of Talladega. In 1855, he became editor of The Talladega Reporter.

Cruikshank was a Whig. In 1863, he defeated Jabez L. M. Curry and was elected to the Confederate States House of Representatives. He represented Alabama's 4th district, from 1864 to March 1865. In February 1865, he was made chairman of the Committee on Enrolled Bills. Ideologically, he opposed President Jefferson Davis and the American Civil War, with him allegedly supporting reuniting with the Union. He was described as progressive.

From 1865 to 1868, Cruikshank was the commissioner in charge with relieving the state of its destitution, having been appointed by Governor Parsons. He was administrator of Talladega County at the time of his death. He was a founder of the Alabama Institute for the Deaf and Blind, serving as its second president. He also owned a newspaper.

== Personal life and death ==
Cruikshank was described as having "an agreeable exterior, and an active and well-stored mind", and was also described as a "little country editor without brains of character". In 1850, he married Maltilda Washington Chrisman, the granddaughter of Charles McDowell. Together, they had a son, George, who became a newspaper editor. He died on October 10, 1881, aged 54, in Talladega, after being ejected from his horse. He was buried at Clark Hill Cemetery.
