= Constantin Bisanz =

American entrepreneur and investor

- Born: 1974 (age 51–52); Austria
- Citizenship: United States
- Occupation: Entrepreneur
- Years active: 2001-present

Constantin Bisanz (born 1974) is an American entrepreneur, investor, and extreme sports enthusiast. He is the founder of companies like brands4friends, TruckScout24, PlusDental, and Aloha. He set a world record for kite-surfing across the Bering Strait in 2011.

== Business career ==
Bisanz started his business career by founding a commercial vehicle company, TruckScout24, at the age of 27. Then he launched three more business companies. His fifth company, Brands4Friends, a German fashion e-commerce site that was founded in 2007, was sold to eBay in 2011.

Later, he studied the Ayuryedic medicines during his visit to India. Getting inspired by it, he launched his own wellness brand, Aloha, in January 2014, in New York. In 2017, he, along with David Khalil, Peter Baumgart, and Lukas Brosseder, started PlusDental, a dental cosmetics company based in Berlin.

== Sports ==
Bisanz set a world record for kite surfing across the Bering Strait from Alaska to Russia in the summer of 2011. On the Necker Island, he conducts kite-surfing events for entrepreneurs alongside Sir Richard Branson.

== Accolades ==
Bisanz was honored as the "German Entrepreneur of the Year" by the Harvard Business School and the "Exit Champion" for closing Germany's largest Internet exit transaction.
