= Lane Sutton =

American internet entrepreneur (born 1997)

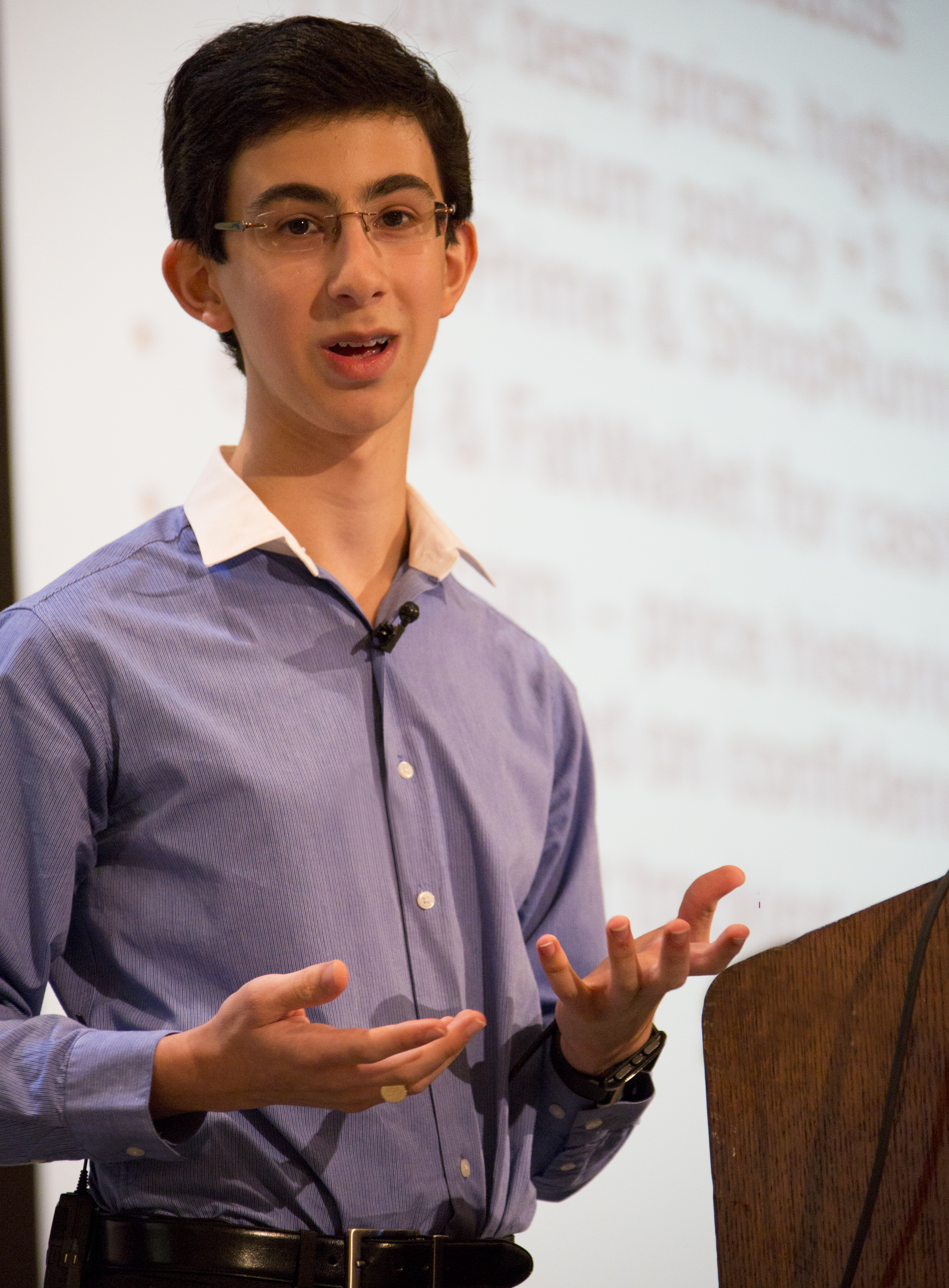
- Sutton in 2013
- Born: Lane Sutton; 1997 (age 28–29)
- Occupations: Speaker; Entrepreneur; Student
- Years active: 2008–present

Lane Sutton (born 1997) is an American entrepreneur and public speaker.

== History ==
Sutton first became known to the public at the age of 13 when The Boston Globe recognized him for meeting Tony Hsieh, speaking at PodCamp, early start to entrepreneurship and using the computer "at barely 8", and his experience. Lane became a subject of national interest at the age of 14 when being featured in The Wall Street Journal for a guest lecture at an Emerson College social media marketing class where he advised students about how to work big brands' social campaigns, as well as Forbes and CNN.

Since May 2010, Lane has been a public speaker about the world of social media, marketing, youth, privacy, and reaching the younger generation. Lane has also been an advocate for privacy to promote the dangers of oversharing and the importance of maintaining a positive reputation online.

At the age of 11, Lane created a website, Kid Critic to publish reviews for children and families about movies, books, activities, products, all from a youth perspective.

Sutton attended and spoke at the 2012 SXSW Interactive. In September 2013, Lane spoke at the TEDxRedmond conference.

In 2015, Sutton graduated from Framingham High School.
