= List of Turkish entrepreneurs =

This is a list of notable Turkish entrepreneurs.

== A ==
- Aydın Doğan

== B ==
- Bülent Eczacıbaşı

== E ==
- Erol Sabancı

== H ==
- Hüsnü Özyeğin

== M ==
- Mehmet Karamehmet
- Murat Ülker
- Murat Vargı

== Ö ==
- Ömer Sabancı

== R ==
- Rahmi Koç

== S ==
- Suat Günsel
- Suna Kıraç

== Ş ==
- Şarık Tara
- Şevket Sabancı

== T ==
- Turgay Ciner
