= Jeremy Levitt =

Australian entrepreneur

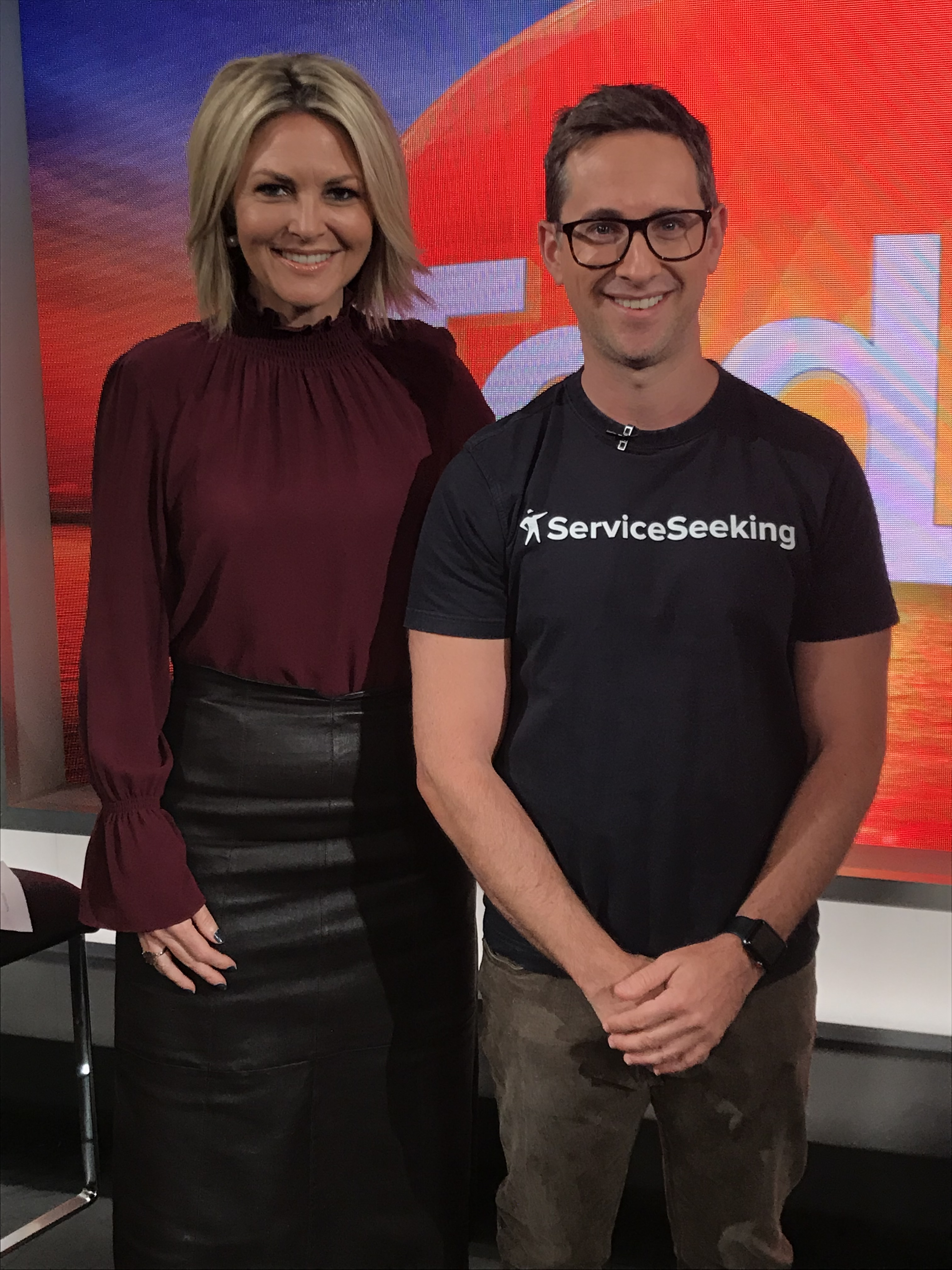
- Georgie Gardner and Jeremy Levitt on the Today Show on Channel 9 in 2018.
- Born: 17 October 1979 (age 47)
- Education: University of Sydney
- Occupation: Entrepreneur
- Known for: Founding PodProperty and ServiceSeeking.com.au

Jeremy Levitt (born 17 October 1979) is an Australian entrepreneur and commentator on property and economic trends across Australia.

== Early life ==
Levitt was born on 17 October 1979, and raised in Sydney, Australia. His mother was an emigrant from Romania.

He received a combined Bachelor of Commerce and Bachelor of Laws degree with first class honors from the University of Sydney in 2002. After his graduation, he proceeded to practice law at Allens.

== Career ==
=== PodProperty ===
In 2006, Levitt and Jonathan Stambolis co-founded PodProperty, an online legal service provider which specializes in co-ownership agreements for tenants in common which distributes its co-ownership agreements through the Commonwealth Bank. As of 2018, he is the CEO of the company.

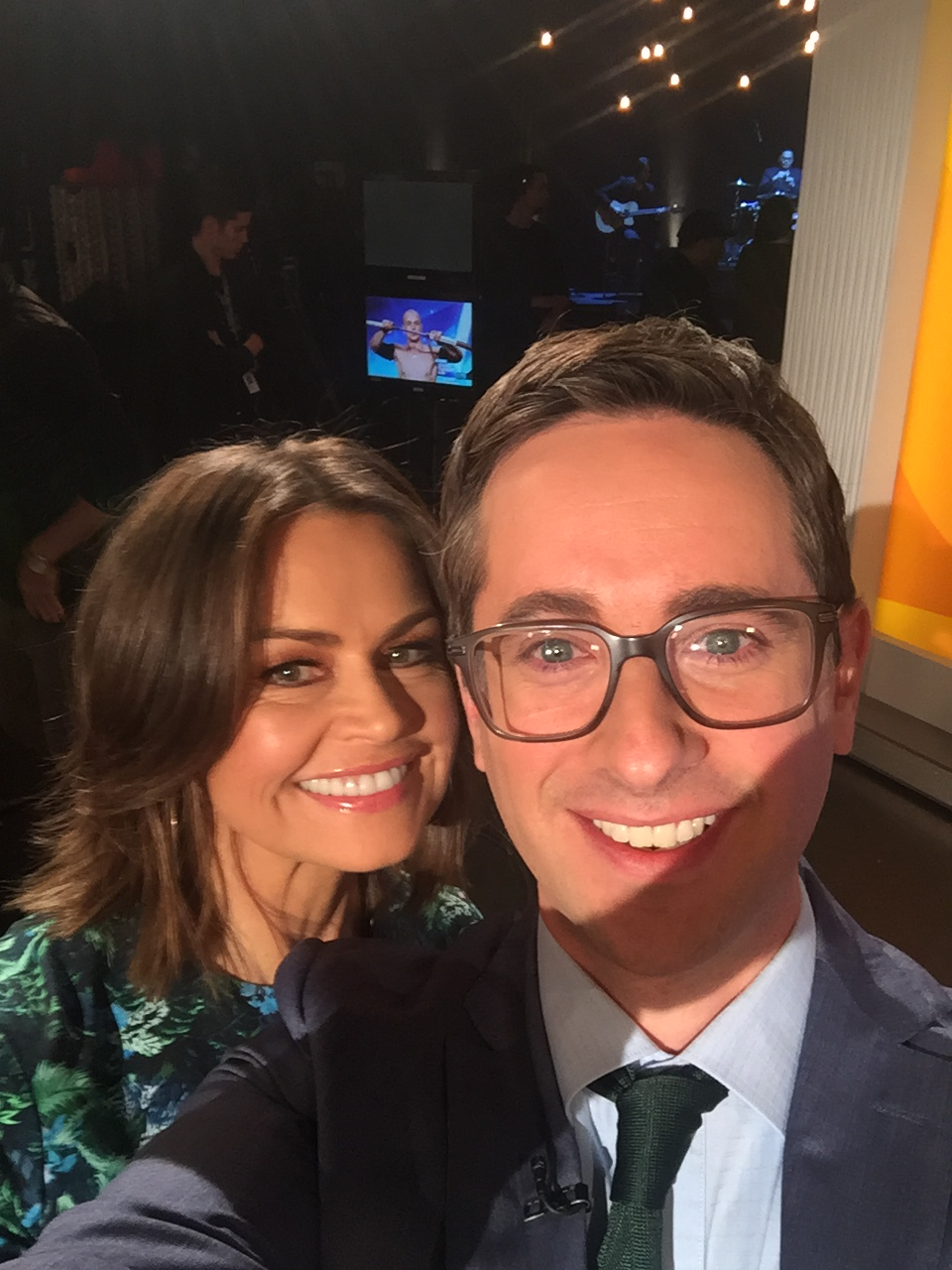
Lisa Wilkinson and Jeremy Levitt in the Channel 9 studios prior to their interview on the Tradie Rich List in 2019.

=== ServiceSeeking.com.au ===
In 2007, Levitt, Oliver Pennington and Daniel Sabados co-founded ServiceSeeking.com.au, an online services marketplace, where tradesmen contact customers to get jobs done. Levitt procured more than $10 million in venture capital for the business to launch it and raised money from the 5 founders of Carsales Ltd including Greg Roebuck and Wal Pisciotta, Hamish Douglass from Magellan, Anthony Klok (ex-CEO of Betfair) and David Allingham, owner and portfolio manager at Eley Griffiths Group. As of 2017, ServiceSeeking.com.au has over 20,000 paying customers and has fielded over 10 million quotes. The website has reportedly generated over $3.2 billion worth of jobs. As of 2018, Levitt and Pennington are the CEOs and Sabados the CTO of the company.

Levitt surveys his customer database to determine the cheapest and most expensive areas in Australia to hire tradespeople. He also produces the Tradie Rich List, a list of the wealthiest tradesmen in Australia ranked by yearly incomes and charge out rates. His data reports which trades earn $100,000 per year or more.

== Awards and recognition ==
In 1997, he received the Ivo Whiston Kerr memorial price for Economics at Sydney Grammar in 1997 and the Prize for First Year Accounting at Sydney University in 1998.

In 2010, for his contributions in the Australian entrepreneurship and job market, Levitt was listed on Smart Company's "Hot 30 Under 30" list.

In 2012, Levitt was featured on the December's issue of the Entrepreneurs' Organization Octane Magazine.

In 2014, Levitt received a nomination for a Pearcey Award, namely the NSW 2014 TECH Entrepreneur of the Year Award. He was among the finalists. The committee was composed of high-profile members from the Australian Computer Society, the Australian Institute of International Affairs and the Pearcy Foundation.
