= John Crookshanks =

Royal Navy officer

Captain John Crookshanks
- Born: 1708
- Died: 20 February 1795 (aged 86–87); London
- Occupation: Naval officer

Captain John Crookshanks (1708 – 20 February 1795) was a Royal Navy officer.

== Life ==
Crookshanks entered as a volunteer on board the Torbay with Captain Nicholas Haddock in the autumn of 1725. While serving in her he seems to have found favour with the Hon. John Byng, whom he followed to the Gibraltar, Princess Louisa, and Falmouth. In August 1732 he passed his examination for the rank of lieutenant; was made lieutenant in March 1734, and in July 1742 was promoted to be captain of the Lowestoft frigate of 20 guns. On 17 Sept. 1742, being in company with the Medway of 60 guns, she fell in with a French ship in the Straits. In the chase, as night came on, the Lowestoft far outsailed the Medway, and came up with the enemy; but Crookshanks, preferring to wait till daylight, or till the Medway joined, or till the weather moderated, wrapped himself in his cloak and went to sleep. When he woke up the chase was not to be seen. The ship's company were, not unnaturally, indignant, but their murmurs, if they reached the admiralty, carried no weight, and Crookshanks's explanation was considered sufficient.

In the course of 1743 he had again to write an explanatory letter, defending himself against a charge of carelessly performing his duty of protecting the trade in the Straits, so that several merchant ships were picked up by the enemy's privateers. It was said that instead of cruising in search of the enemy's ships he was amusing himself on shore at Gibraltar; but his explanations were considered satisfactory. In 1745 he commanded the Dartmouth in the Mediterranean; and in May 1746 was appointed to the temporary command of the Sunderland of 60 guns, then on the Irish station. On 2 July, off Kinsale, she fell in with three ships judged to be French men-of-war. Crookshanks estimated them as of 40 guns each, and, considering the Sunderland to be no match for the three together, made sail away from them, and night closing in dark, succeeded in escaping. His men were angry and violent; they had not estimated the French force so high, and proposed, with some disturbance, to take the ship from Crookshanks, appoint the first lieutenant as captain, and go down to fight the French. They were quieted, though not without some difficulty; and Crookshanks, if indeed he knew of the uproar, conceived it best to pass it over.

Two days afterwards they broke out into open mutiny, and said loudly that the captain was a coward. One man who had been in the Lowestoft brought up the story of what had happened in the Straits four years before. Crookshanks took his pistols in his hands and went on deck. ‘Damn you,’ roared the ringleader of the mutineers, ‘you dare not show the pistols to the French.’ The man was put in irons, tried by court-martial, and hanged; others were ordered two hundred and fifty lashes; the first lieutenant was dismissed the service; and Crookshanks, being relieved from the command of the Sunderland, was, in the following March, appointed to command the Lark of 40 guns, although Anson, then one of the lords of the admiralty, as well as commander-in-chief of the Channel fleet, had written, on 13 Aug. 1746, a month before the court-martial: ‘The first lieutenant of the Sunderland is a sensible, clever fellow, which is more than I can say of the captain; nor can I discover that the first lieutenant has ever caballed with the common men since Crookshanks came into the ship.’ In June 1747 the Lark, in company with the Warwick of 60 guns, sailed from Spithead for the West Indies.

On their way, near the Azores, on 14 July, they met the Spanish ship Glorioso of 70 guns and 700 men, homeward bound with treasure, said to amount to nearly three millions sterling. The Warwick attacked the big Spaniard manfully enough, at close quarters, while the Lark kept a more prudent distance. The Warwick, being thus unsupported, was reduced to a wreck, and the Glorioso got away and safely landed her treasure at Ferrol (Fraser's Magazine, November 1881, p. 597). The damage the Warwick had sustained rendered it necessary to bear up for Newfoundland, where her captain officially charged Crookshanks with neglect of duty. He was accordingly tried by court-martial at Jamaica, dismissed from the command of the Lark, and cashiered during the king's pleasure. In October 1759 the board of admiralty submitted that he might, after twelve years, be restored to the half-pay of his rank, which was accordingly done.

About the same time Crookshanks published a pamphlet in which he charged Admiral Charles Knowles, who at the time of his court-martial was commander-in-chief at Jamaica, with influencing the decision of the court, out of personal ill-feeling. Knowles replied, refuting the charge, which indeed appears to have been groundless, and other pamphlets followed. Again, in 1772, Crookshanks brought a similar but more scurrilous charge against Knowles's secretary, the judge advocate at his trial, who retaliated by publishing in extenso the minutes of the court-martial. These give no reason for supposing that his condemnation was not perfectly just, or that his sentence was not a fortunate thing for the navy. Even if he was not guilty of cowardice, the officer who incurs suspicion of it on three distinct occasions within the space of four years is too unlucky to have command of a ship of war; in addition to which Crookshanks's manner and temper towards both men and officers seem to have been harsh and overbearing. He died in London on 20 February 1795.
