= Prescott Lee =

American technology industry executive

Prescott Lee is a technology industry executive who co-founded the company FilmLoop along with Kyle Mashima. Lee previously founded and built the online company eCircles.com with Nathanael "Joe" Hayashi, which they subsequently sold to the firm Classmates.com.
