= Kelsey Ramsden =

Canadian entrepreneur (born 1976)

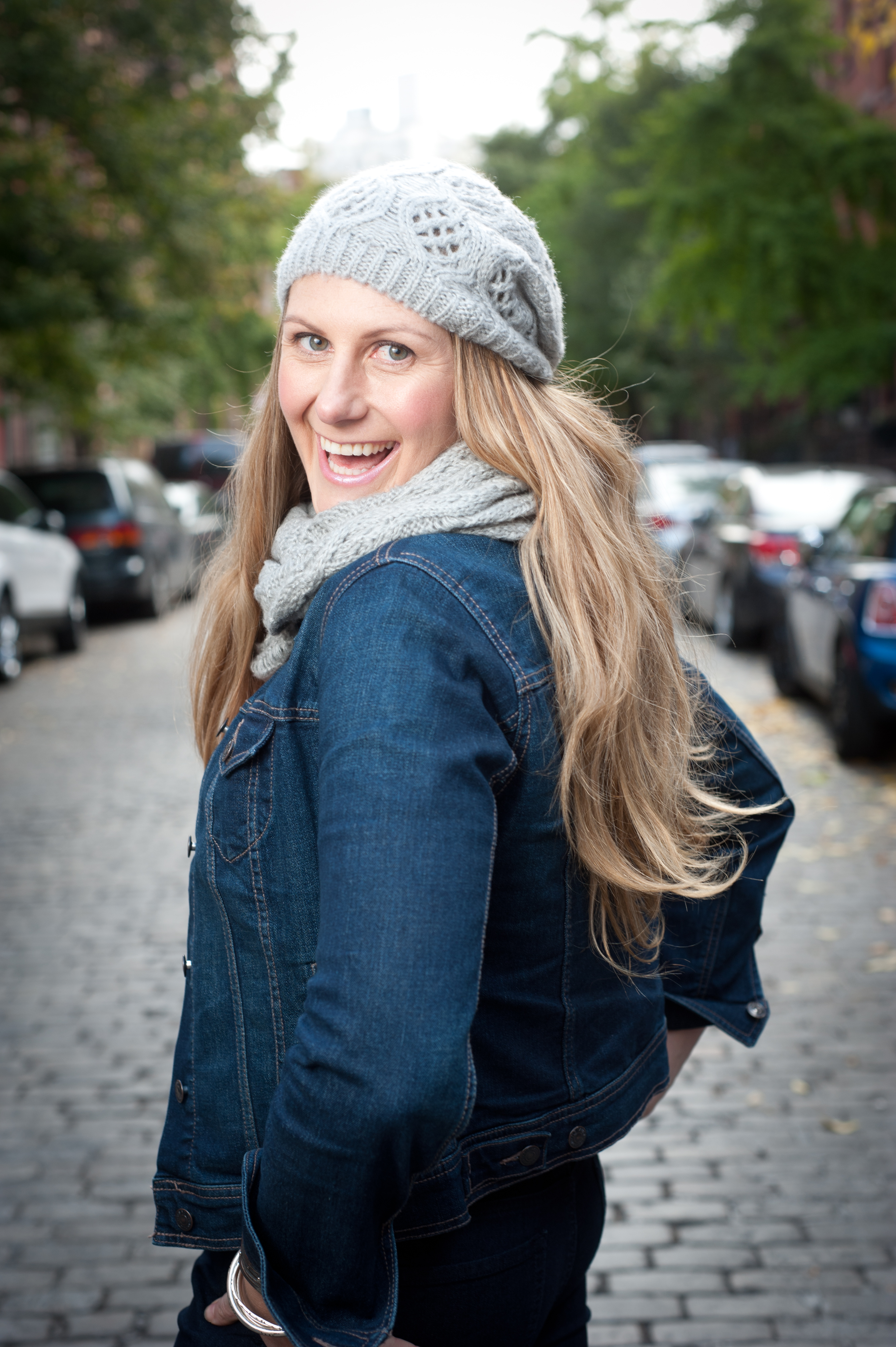
- Born: July 12, 1976 (age 49); Kelowna, British Columbia, Canada
- Education: University of Victoria, University of Western Ontario
- Occupation: Founder of SparkPlay
- Spouse: Andrew Ramsden

Kelsey Ramsden (born July 12, 1976) is a Canadian businesswoman. She is the President of Belvedere Place Development and SparkPlay.

== Early life and education ==
Kelsey Ramsden was born in 1976 in Kelowna, British Columbia. Ramsden completed her undergraduate degree at the University of Victoria and went on to complete her MBA from the Richard Ivey School of Business at the University of Western Ontario in 2002.

== Career ==
In 2005, Ramsden founded Tallus Ridge Development, a residential project management company in Kelowna, British Columbia.

In 2012, she founded SparkPlay, a children's monthly subscription service based in London, Ontario. As of 2017, the website is inactive. In 2005, Ramsden became the president of Belvedere Place Development, a civil construction firm based in Kelowna, British Columbia.

As of 2013, Ramsden was a member of the entrepreneurship advisory council at the Richard Ivey School of Business. She wrote contributions for Huffington Post between 2013 and 2015. Ramsden sits on the Richard Branson Centre for Entrepreneurship as a Mentor.

Kelsey Ramsden is known for building multiple multi-million dollar companies across North America. She has been named Canada's top female entrepreneur twice in the last ten years.

== Recognition ==
In 2010, Ramsden was included in a list "Top 25 under 35" by Canadian Business magazine.

Ramsden was ranked first in Profit magazine's W100 ranking of Canada's top female entrepreneurs in 2012 and 2013. She was featured in Profit's W100 November 2013 issue with an article: "The Time-Management Secrets of Canada's Top Female Entrepreneur."

In November 2013, Ramsden was one of two Canadians included in Ernst & Young "Entrepreneurial Winning Women".

Ramsden became a part of Dell women's entrepreneur network in March 2014, and was ranked among the top 200 women entrepreneurs globally.
