= PATSY Award =

Award for performing animals in American film and television

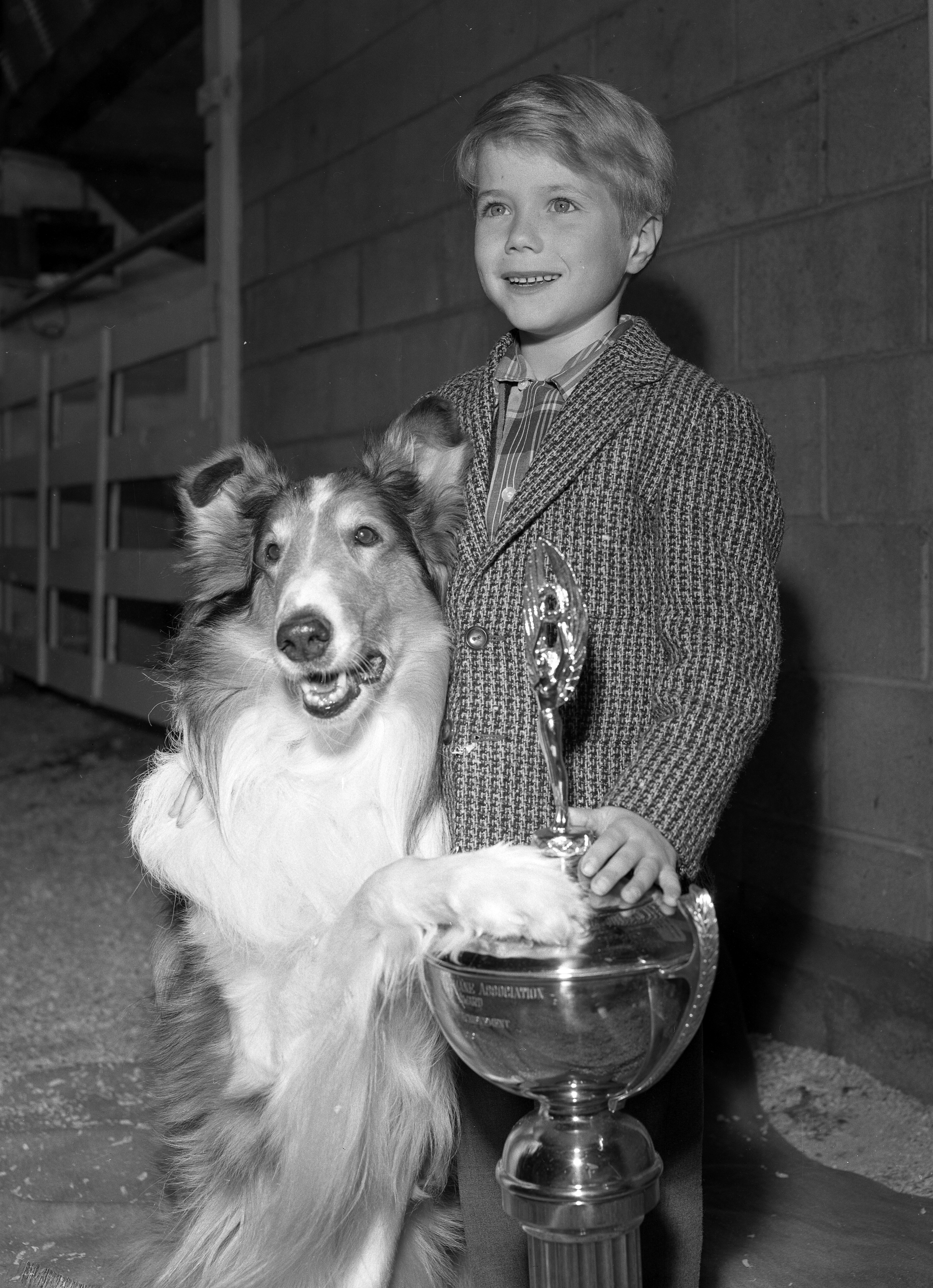
Jon Provost with Lassie and her PATSY Award in 1958

The PATSY Award was originated by the Hollywood office of the American Humane Association in 1939. They decided to honor animal performers after a horse was killed in an on-set accident during the filming of the Tyrone Power film Jesse James. The letters are an acronym, and stand for Picture Animal Top Star of the Year. A later acronym was also included: Performing Animal Television Star of the Year.

The very first recipient of a PATSY was Francis the Talking Mule in 1951, in a ceremony hosted by Ronald Reagan at Hollywood's Carthay Circle Theater. The award later covered both film and television and was separated into four categories: canine, equine, wild and special. The special category encompassed everything from goats to cats to pigs – Arnold Ziffel of TV's Green Acres was a two-time winner. Arnold's trainer, Frank Inn, was the proud owner of over 40 PATSY awards, thanks to his work with Orangey, the cat from Rhubarb (1951) and Breakfast at Tiffany's (1961); Higgins, the dog (who played the lead in the Benji movies and "Dog" on Petticoat Junction); Cleo the Basset Hound; and Lassie, and Tramp the dog from My Three Sons to name a few. Lassie was retired to the PATSY Hall of Fame after receiving many awards over the years.

The Craven Award was named in honor of Richard C. Craven, the first director of the Hollywood AHA. It recognized animals that would normally have had no opportunity to appear in a starring role. The TV and Movie Animal Walk of Fame was established in front of the Burbank Animal Shelter, honoring certain early recipients of the PATSY Awards.

By the 1970s, the awards were being presented in a televised ceremony, with animal recipients selected by the general public who voted in ballots which appeared in Associated Press newspapers. The first network presentation was on CBS in 1973.

Over the years the PATSY Award ceremony was hosted by various celebrities, including Betty White, Allen Ludden, and Bob Barker. Barker has stated he eventually resigned in protest of the cruel methods some trainers use when training animals for films.

The awards ended in 1986 due to lack of funding. That year the Genesis Awards were established to honor individuals in the major news and entertainment media for producing outstanding works which raise public awareness of animal issues. In 2011 the American Humane Society announced the creation of the Pawscars, described as, "an unofficial, animal-centric spin on the Oscars."

The American Humane Association is the organization responsible for the disclaimer at the end of many films and television programs that "No Animals Were Harmed" in the production.

== PATSY Award Winners (partial listing) ==
Source, 1951–1973:

=== 1951 ===
Motion Pictures

1. Francis the Talking Mule (Francis)
2. California the horse (The Palomino)
3. Pierre the chimp (My Friend Irma Goes West)

Award of Excellence

- Flame the dog (My Pal)
- Lassie the dog (Challenge to Lassie)
- Black Diamond the horse (Black Midnight)
- Jackie the Lion (Samson and Delilah)

Craven Award

- Jerry Brown the horse – trained by Ace Hudkins

=== 1952 ===
Motion Pictures

1. Rhubarb the cat (Rhubarb)
2. Francis the mule (Francis Goes to the Races)

Award of Excellence

- Chinook the dog (Yukon Manhunt)
- Diamond the horse (Flame of Araby)
- Corky the dog (Behave Yourself)

Craven Award

- Smoky the horse – owned/trained by Fat Jones

=== 1953 ===
Motion Pictures

1. Jackie the lion (Fearless Fagan)
2. Bonzo the Chimp (Bonzo Goes to College)
3. Trigger the horse (Son of Paleface)

Award of Excellence

- Francis the mule (Francis Goes to West Point)
- Tramp Jr. the dog (Room for One More)
- Cheeta the chimp (Tarzan's Savage Fury)
- Chinook the dog (Yukon Gold)

Craven Award

- Bracket the horse – owned by Hudkins Stables

=== 1954 ===
Motion Pictures

1. Sam the dog (Hondo)
2. Francis the mule (Francis Covers the Big Town)
3. Jackie the lion (Androcles and the Lion)

Award of Excellence

- Baron the dog (Back to God's Country)
- Peggy the chimp (Valley of the Head Hunters)
- Jackie the lion (White Witch Doctor)

Craven Award

- Cocaine the horse – owned/trained by Chuck Roberson

=== 1955 ===
Motion Pictures

1. Beauty the horse (Gypsy Colt)
2. Francis the mule (Francis Joins the WACS)
3. Esmerelda the seal (20,000 Leagues Under the Sea)

Award of Excellence

- Shep the dog (A Bullet Is Waiting)
- Satin the tiger (Demetrius and the Gladiators)
- Beauty the horse (The Outlaw Stallion)

Craven Award

- Flash the horse – owned/trained by Henry Willis

=== 1956 ===
Motion Pictures

1. Wildfire the dog (It's a Dog's Life)
2. Francis the mule (Francis in the Navy)
3. Faro the dog (The Kentuckian)

Award of Excellence

- N/A

Craven Award

- Flame the dog – owned/trained by Frank Barnes

=== 1957 ===
Motion Pictures

1. Samantha the goose (Friendly Persuasion)
2. Beauty the Horse (Giant)
3. Francis the mule (Francis in the Haunted House)

Award of Excellence

- Silver the horse (The Lone Ranger)
- Lady the dog (Goodbye, My Lady)
- Bascom the dog (Hollywood or Bust)

Craven Award

- King Cotton the horse – owned/trained by Ralph McCutcheon

=== 1958 ===
Starting in 1958 PATSY awards were also awarded to television animals.

Motion Pictures

1. Spike the dog (Old Yeller)
2. Beauty the horse (Wild Is the Wind)
3. Kelly the dog (Kelly and Me)

Television

1. Lassie the dog (Lassie)
2. Cleo the dog (The People's Choice)
3. Rin Tin Tin the dog (The Adventures of Rin Tin Tin)

Award of Excellence

- Tony the horse (Hoofs and Goofs / Movies)
- Flicka the horse (My Friend Flicka / TV)

Craven Award

- Trigger the horse – owned by Roy Rogers / trained by Glenn Randall

=== 1959 ===
Motion Pictures

1. Pyewacket the cat (Bell, Book and Candle)
2. Tonka the horse (Tonka)
3. Henry the rabbit (The Geisha Boy)

Television

1. Lassie the dog (Lassie)
2. Asta the dog (The Thin Man)
3. Rin Tin Tin the dog (The Adventures of Rin Tin Tin)

Award of Excellence

- King the dog (The Proud Rebel / Movies)
- Jasper the dog (Bachelor Father / TV)

Craven Award

- Baldy the horse – owned by Fat Jones Stables / trained by William "Buster" Trow

=== 1960 ===
Motion Pictures

1. Shaggy the dog (The Shaggy Dog)
2. Herman the pigeon (The Gazebo)
3. North Wind the horse (The Sad Horse)

Television

1. Asta the dog (The Thin Man)
2. Lassie the dog (Lassie)
3. Fury the horse (Fury); Jasper the dog (Bachelor Father) - tied

Craven Award

- Sharkey, Dempsey, Choctaw, and Joker the horses

=== 1961 ===
Motion Pictures

1. King Cotton the horse (Pepe)
2. Spike the dog (A Dog of Flanders)
3. Stubbs the monkey (Toby Tyler); Skip the dog (Visit to a Small Planet) - tied

Television

1. Tramp the dog (My Three Sons)
2. Lassie the dog (Lassie)
3. Fury the horse (Fury)

=== 1962 ===
Motion Pictures

1. Orangey the cat (Breakfast at Tiffany's)
2. Pete the dog (The Silent Call)
3. Flame the horse (The Clown and the Kid)

Television

1. Mister Ed the horse (Mister Ed)
2. Lassie the dog (Lassie)
3. Tramp the dog (My Three Sons)

=== 1963 ===
Motion Pictures

1. Big Red the dog (Big Red)
2. Sydney the elephant (Billy Rose's Jumbo)
3. Zamba the lion (The Lion)

Television

1. Mister Ed the horse (Mister Ed)
2. Lassie the dog (Lassie)
3. Tramp the dog (My Three Sons)

Craven Award

- Mickey O'Boyle the horse

=== 1964 ===
Motion Pictures

1. Tom Dooley the dog (Savage Sam)
2. Pluto the dog (My Six Loves)
3. Raunchy the jaguar (Rampage)

Television

1. Lassie the dog (Lassie)
2. Mister Ed the horse (Mister Ed)
3. Tramp the dog (My Three Sons)

=== 1965 ===
Motion Pictures

1. Patrina the tiger (A Tiger Walks)
2. Storm the dog (Goodbye Charlie)
3. Junior the dog (Island of the Blue Dolphins)

Television

1. Flipper the dolphin (Flipper)
2. Lassie the dog (Lassie)
3. Mister Ed the horse (Mister Ed)

Craven Award

- Lucky Buck the horse

=== 1966 ===
Motion Pictures

1. Syn Cat the cat (That Darn Cat!)
2. Clarence the lion (Clarence, the Cross-Eyed Lion)
3. Judy the chimp (Clarence, the Cross-Eyed Lion)

Television

1. Flipper the dolphin (Flipper)
2. Lord Nelson the dog (Please Don't Eat the Daisies)
3. Higgins the dog (Petticoat Junction)

Craven Award

- Smokey the horse

=== 1967 ===
Motion Pictures

1. Elsa the lion (Born Free)
2. Duke the dog
3. Vindicator the steer (The Rare Breed)

Television

1. Judy the chimp (Daktari)
2. Flipper the dolphin (Flipper)
3. Arnold the pig (Green Acres)

=== 1968 ===
Motion Pictures

1. Ben the bear (Gentle Giant)
2. Sir Tim the mountain lion
3. Sophie the sea lion (Doctor Dolittle)

Television

1. Arnold the pig (Green Acres)
2. Ben the bear (Gentle Ben)
3. Clarence the lion (Daktari)

=== 1969 ===
Motion Pictures

1. Albarado the horse (The Horse in the Gray Flannel Suit)

Television

1. Arnold the pig (Green Acres, continuing role)
2. Timmy the chimp (single appearance)
3. Chauncey the cougar (commercial)

=== 1970 ===
Motion Pictures

1. Rascal the raccoon (Rascal)

Television

1. Scruffy the dog (The Ghost & Mrs. Muir, continuing role)
2. Algae the seal (single appearance)

Craven Award

- Kilroy the horse

=== 1971 ===
Motion Pictures

1. Ben the rat (Willard)

Television

1. Arnold the pig (Green Acres, continuing role)
2. Margie the elephant, Lassie's family three pups (tie)
3. Pax the dog (Longstreet)
4. Otto the horse (Lassie, single appearance)

=== 1972 ===
Motion Pictures

1. Ben the rat (Ben)

Television

1. Farouk the dog (Ironside, single appearance)
2. Morris the Cat (special award, commercials)

Craven Award

- Cocaine the horse

=== 1973 ===
Motion Pictures)

- Alpha the Dolphin (The Day of the Dolphin)

Television

- Midnight the Cat ("Mannix and Barnaby Jones (TV series) (CBS Mystery Theater), Opening Trailer)")

Television Movie

- Caesar the Dog (Trapped)

Television Commercials (new category)

- Scruffy the Dog (Chuck Wagon (dog food) commercials)

Sharon (Lewis) Evans AHA PATSY Award winner 1st Place with "Midnight" the Cat for best animal performance in a TV Series. American Humane Association "The National Review", June 1974 issue.

=== 1974 ===
Motion Pictures

- Tonto the cat (Harry and Tonto)

=== 1976 ===
Motion Pictures

- Rosco the Mule (The Apple Dumpling Gang)

== Trophy listing ==
The February 1, 1999, episodes of Antiques Roadshow features the 1967 American Humane Association Trophy for Outstanding Achievement in Motion Pictures, appraised by Leila Dunbar. On the trophy's base is a series of plaques listing the top winner in this category, matched with the year of the animal's movie work rather than the year the award was bestowed. The plaques list:

Year	Name	Animal	Picture	Producer
1950	Francis	Mule	Francis	Universal International
1951	Rhubarb	Cat	Rhubarb	Perlberg-Seaton
1952	Jackie	Lion	Fearless Fagan	MGM
1953	Sam	Dog	Hondo	Wayne-Fellows
1954	Gypsy	Horse	Gypsy Colt	MGM
1955	Wildfire	Dog	It's a Dog's Life	MGM
1956	Samantha	Goose	Friendly Persuasion	Allied Artists
1957	Spike	Dog	Old Yeller	Walt Disney Productions
1958	Pyewacket	Cat	Bell, Book and Candle	Columbia Pictures
1959	Shaggy	Dog	The Shaggy Dog	Walt Disney Productions
1960	King Cotton	Horse	Pepe	Columbia Pictures
1961	Orangey	Cat	Breakfast at Tiffany's	Paramount Pictures
1962	Big Red	Dog	Big Red	Walt Disney Productions
1963	Tom Dooley	Dog	Savage Sam	Walt Disney Productions
1964	Patrina	Tiger	A Tiger Walks	Walt Disney Productions
1965	Syn	Cat	That Darn Cat!	Walt Disney Productions
1966	Elsa	Lion	Born Free	Columbia Pictures
1967	Ben	Bear	Gentle Giant	Ivan Tors Productions
1974	Tonto	Cat	Harry and Tonto	20th Century Fox
