= George Cruikshank (editor) =

American educator, newspaper editor, and historian

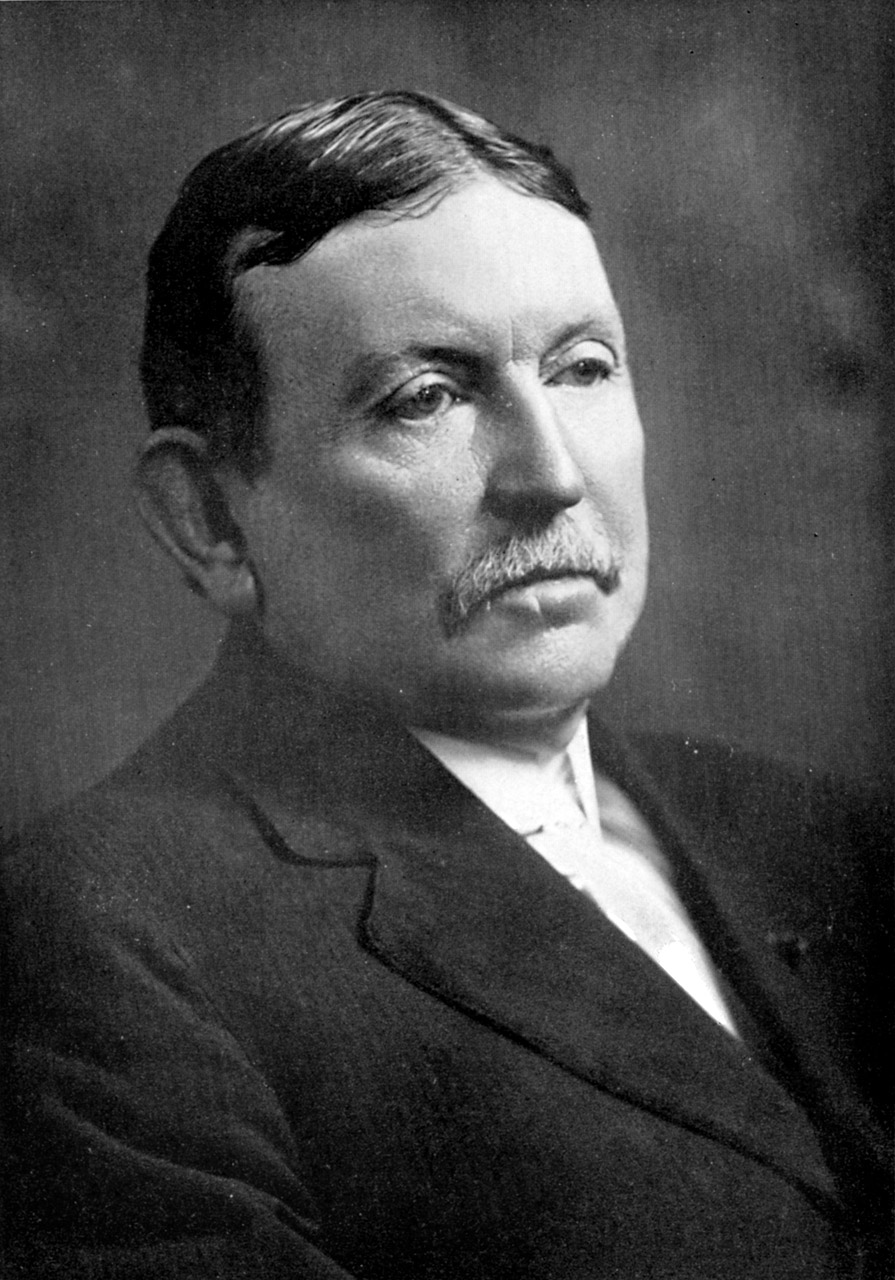
George Cruikshank c. 1914

George Marcus Cruikshank (March 15, 1857 – September 15, 1936) was an American educator, newspaper editor, and historian active mostly in Birmingham, Alabama. He had political appointments on staff at Congress and as US Postmaster of Birmingham.

== Early life, education and early career ==
George Marcus Cruikshank, born in Versailles, Kentucky, was the son of Marcus Cruikshank and his wife. The family moved to Alabama, where George's father was elected as a Confederate congressman and later mayor of Talladega, Alabama. George was raised in Talladega and completed his studies there.

Cruikshank taught for a time in the Talladega County schools and the Alabama School for the Blind.

== Newspaper and political career ==
In 1883, Cruikshank moved to Birmingham as editor of the Birmingham Chronicle.

He married in 1887. He and his wife had two children, Mary and Marcus.

In 1890, Cruikshank moved to Washington, D.C., with an appointment as superintendent of the "folding room" of the House of Representatives, where all congressional mail was delivered.

He resigned in 1893 to accept another political appointment as Postmaster of Birmingham and returned to Alabama. When his four-year term concluded, Cruikshank returned to newspapers as editor of the Birmingham Ledger, which he developed as one of the larger newspapers in the South. The Ledger was acquired by The Birmingham News in 1920.

Cruikshank's book, A History of Birmingham and its Environs, was published in two volumes in 1920. He was a Master Mason, a member of the Alabama Press Association and the Birmingham Press Club, as well as the Commercial Club of Birmingham. He was president of the Birmingham chapter of the Society for the Prevention of Cruelty to Animals.

Cruikshank died in 1936. He is buried at Grand Bay Cemetery in Mobile County.
