= The Diary of Anne Frank (1959 film) =

1959 American film directed by George Stevens

- Film poster by Tom Chantrell
- Directed by: George Stevens
- Written by: Frances Goodrich; Albert Hackett
- Based on: The Diary of Anne Frank 1955 by Frances Goodrich; Albert Hackett; The Diary of a Young Girl 1947 by Anne Frank
- Produced by: George Stevens
- Starring: Millie Perkins; Joseph Schildkraut; Richard Beymer; Shelley Winters; Diane Baker; Ed Wynn; Gusti Huber; Lou Jacobi
- Cinematography: William C. Mellor
- Edited by: David Bretherton; William Mace; Robert Swink
- Music by: Alfred Newman
- Distributed by: 20th Century-Fox
- Release date: March 18, 1959
- Running time: 179 minutes
- Country: United States
- Languages: English; German
- Budget: $3.8 million
- Box office: $2.3 million (est. US/ Canada rentals)

The Diary of Anne Frank is a 1959 American epic biographical drama film based on the Pulitzer Prize-winning 1955 play of the same name, which was in turn based on the posthumously published diary of Anne Frank, a German-born Jewish girl who lived in hiding in Amsterdam with her family during World War II. It was directed by George Stevens, a Hollywood filmmaker previously involved with capturing evidence of concentration camps during the war, from a screenplay by Frances Goodrich and Albert Hackett. It is the first film version of both the play and the original story, and features three members of the original Broadway cast.

Many of Frank's writings to her diary were addressed as "Dear Kitty". It was published after the end of the war by her father, Otto Frank (played in the film by Joseph Schildkraut, who was also Jewish). His entire family had been murdered in the Holocaust. The interiors were shot in Los Angeles on a sound stage duplicate of the Amsterdam factory, with exteriors filmed at the actual building.

The film was positively received by critics, currently holding an 81% critics rating on Rotten Tomatoes. It was nominated for eight Academy Awards in 1960, winning three, including Best Supporting Actress for Shelley Winters. Shelley Winters later donated her Oscar to the Anne Frank House museum. In 2006, it was honored as the eighteenth most inspiring American film on the list AFI's 100 Years...100 Cheers.

== Plot ==
The film's trailer

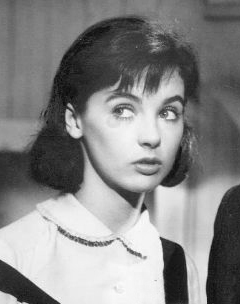
Millie Perkins as Anne Frank, a German-born Jewish girl who kept a diary documenting her life in hiding amid Nazi persecution during the German occupation of the Netherlands.

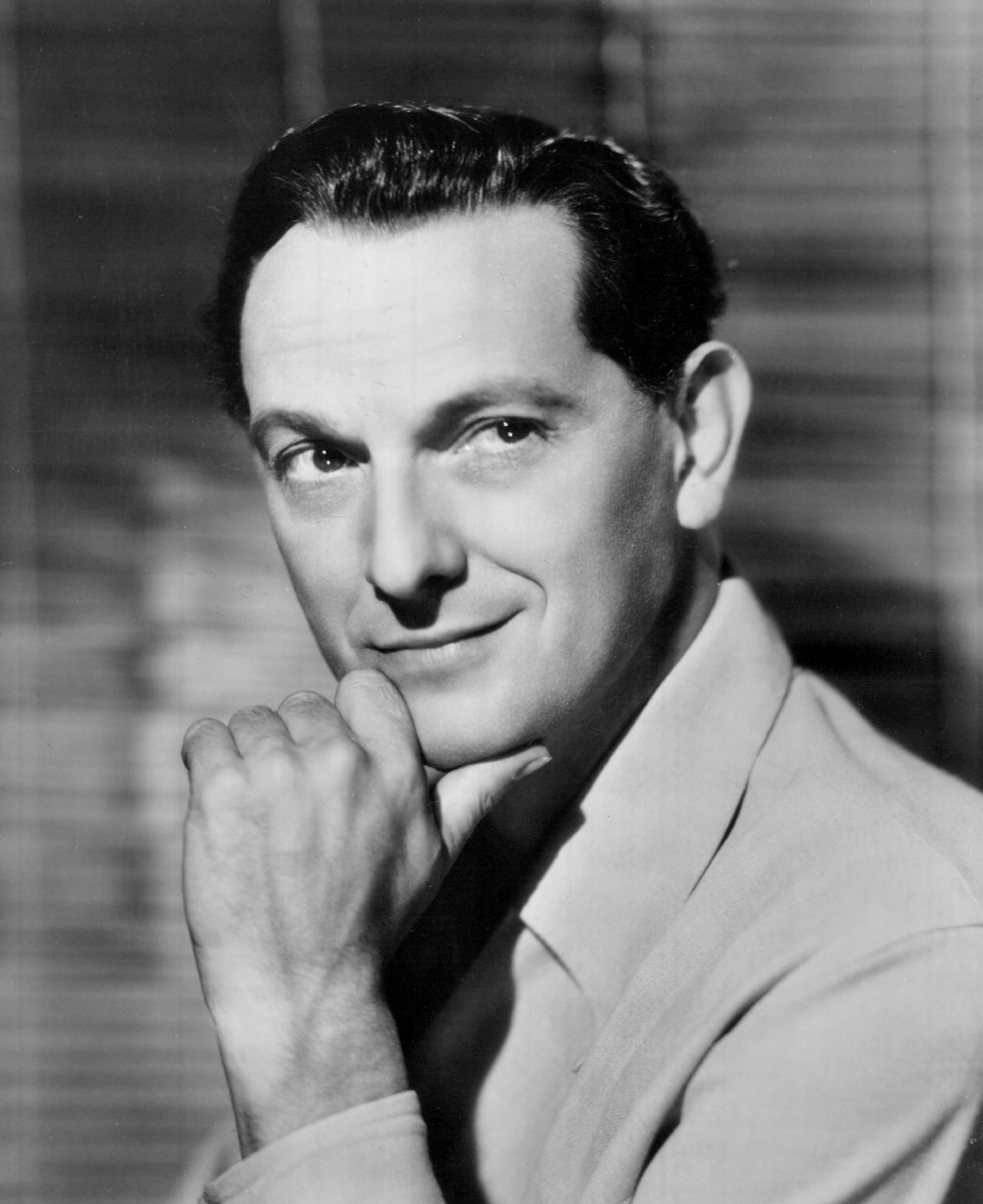
Joseph Schildkraut plays Otto Frank, a German businessman, and the father of Anne Frank, who made the arrangements for the attic hiding place. The only survivor from the attic, he edited and published the first edition of her diary in 1947.

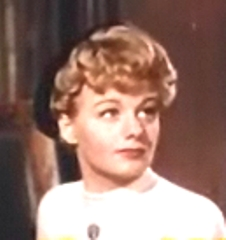
Shelley Winters plays Petronella van Daan, mother of Peter van Daan, who along with her husband and son went into hiding along with the Frank family in the attic.

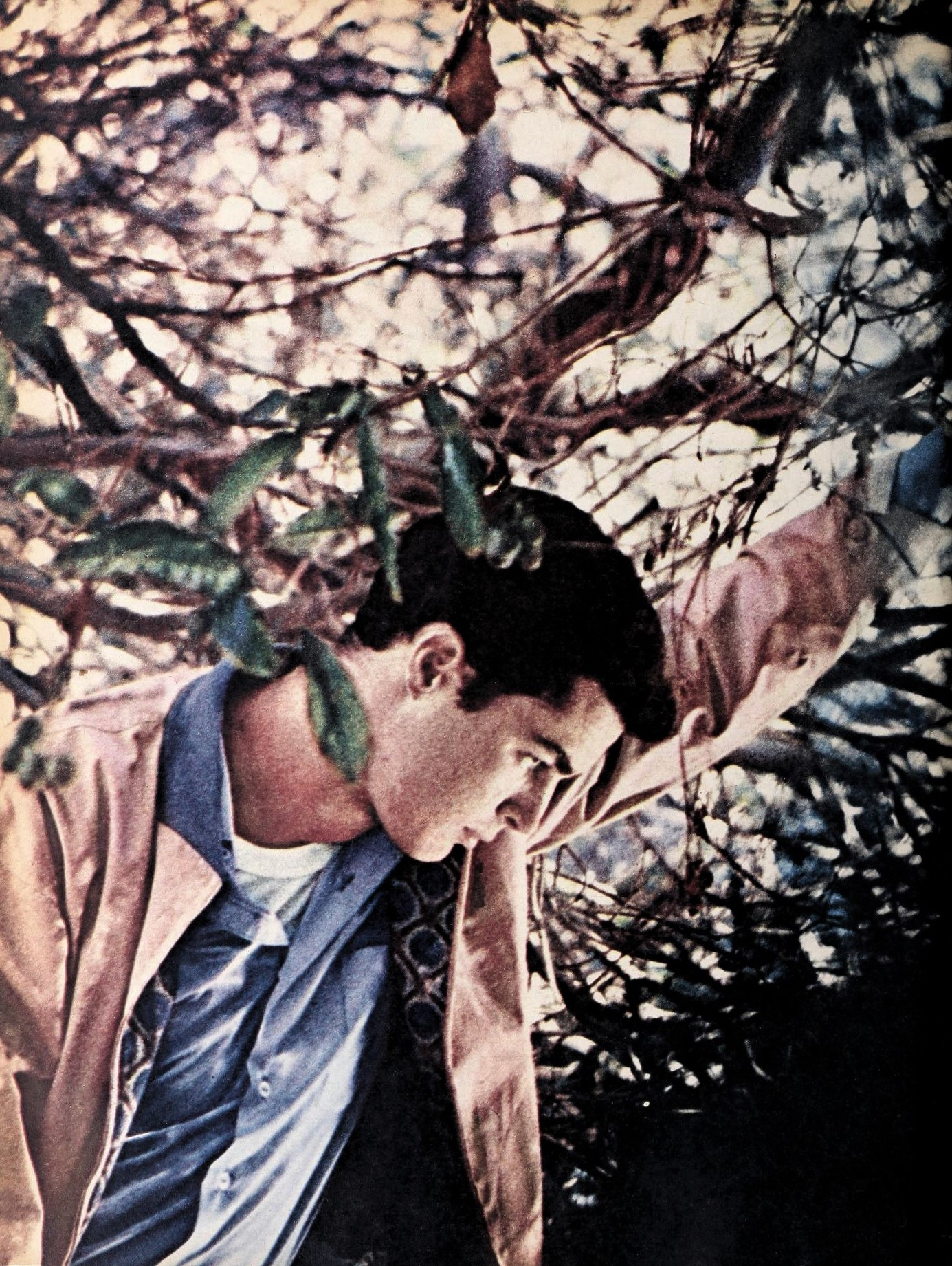
Richard Beymer plays Peter van Daan, son of Hans and Petronella van Daan. Almost three years older than Anne, Peter becomes attracted to her. Anne confides to him dreams of becoming a writer, and Peter voices frustration over his inability to join the war effort.

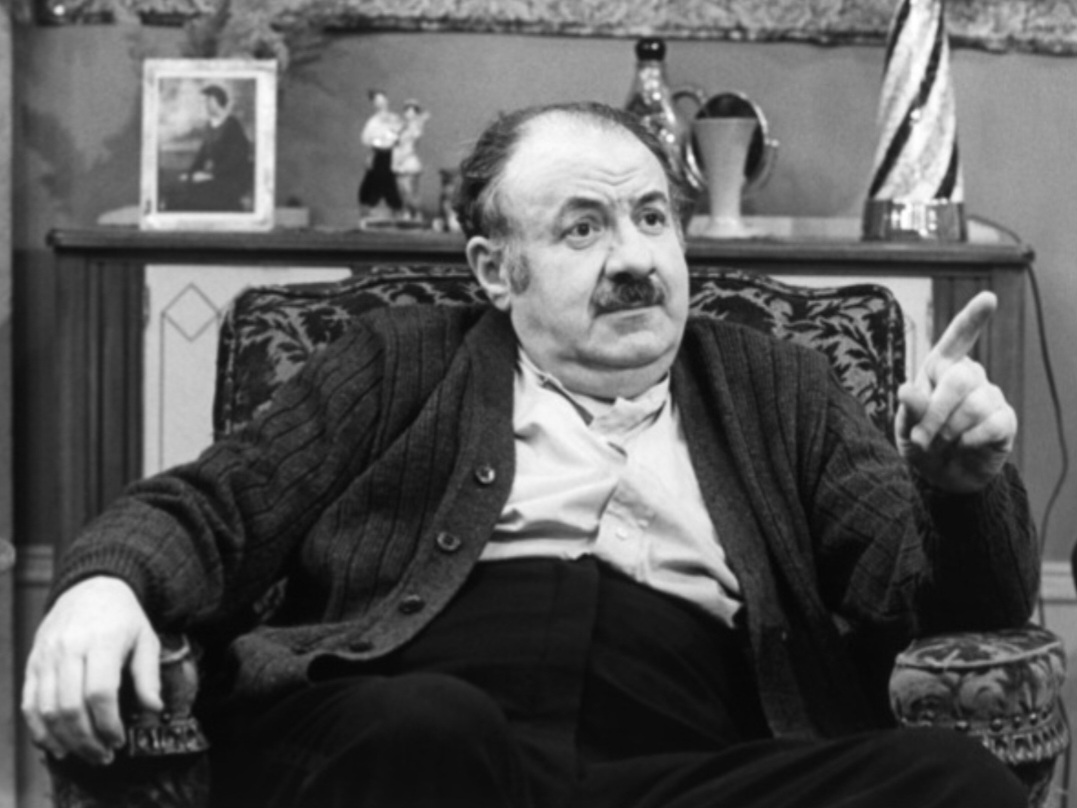
Lou Jacobi plays Hans van Daan, father of Peter and husband of Petronella. His continuous arguing with his wife adds to the strain of confinement in the attic hiding place.

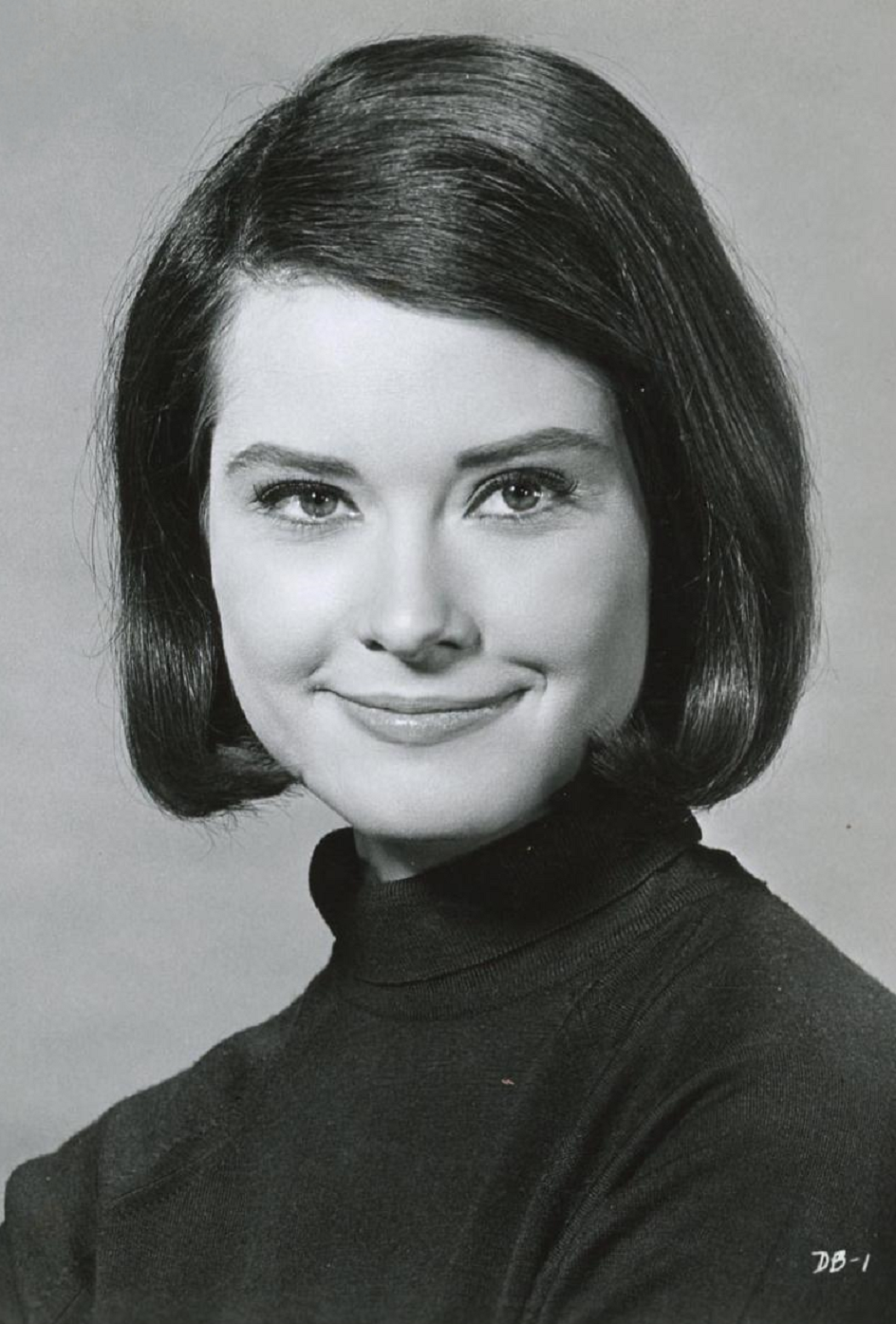
Diane Baker plays Margot Frank, Anne’s older sister, who is arrested along with the others when police raid the attic.

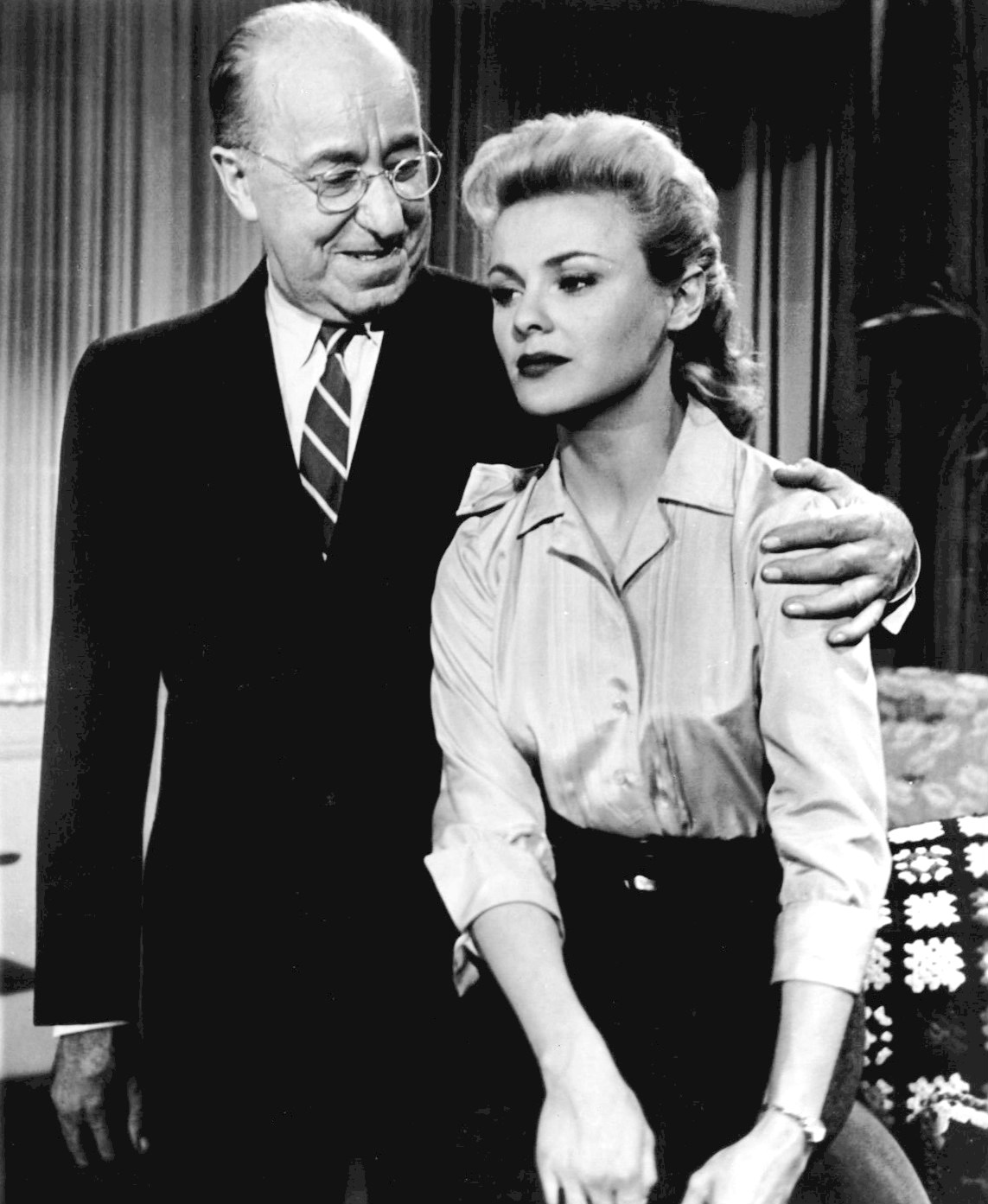
Ed Wynn (left) plays Albert Dussel, a Jewish dentist who comes into hiding with the Franks and the van Daans, who confirms that many of their friends have disappeared.

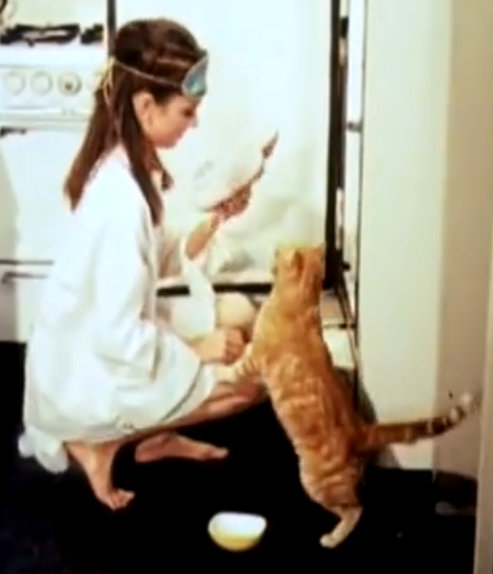
Orangey plays Mouschi, Peter van Daan’s beloved cat, who goes into hiding with the others. (Orangey is seen here with Audrey Hepburn in Breakfast at Tiffany's.)

In 1945, after World War II, Otto Frank returns to the Amsterdam garret where his family hid for more than 2 years before being arrested by the Gestapo. He is accompanied by Miep Gies and Mr. Kraler, his Christian employees who shielded the Jewish Frank family and 4 others. When Otto searches for the diary kept by his youngest daughter, Anne, Miep promptly retrieves it for him.

In July 1942, Anne writes of the restrictions placed on Jews that drove the Franks into hiding over their spice factory. Sharing the Franks' hiding place are the Van Daans and their teenage son, Peter. Kraler and Miep have conspired with Otto to prepare the hideaway. Those hiding are warned to maintain strict silence during daylight while workers are present. Kraler delivers food and a box for Anne, compiled by Otto, containing her beloved movie star photos and a blank diary.

As months pass, Anne teases Peter, whose only attachment is to his cat, Mouschi. Otto teaches Anne and her sister, Margot, while Petronella Van Daan passes the time reminiscing of her youth. The strain of confinement causes the Van Daans to argue and pits Anne against her mother, Edith. Kraler brings a radio that provides news of the world. Conditions are growing more dire, with Jews suddenly disappearing, shipped to concentration camps. Kraler asks them to take in another person, Miep's Jewish dentist named Albert Dussel, who confirms that many of their friends have disappeared. Dreaming of one of her friends in a concentration camp, Anne wakes up screaming.

In October 1942, news comes of the Allied landing in Africa, and the bombing of Amsterdam intensifies. During Hanukkah, Van Daan abruptly announces that Peter must get rid of Mouschi, who consumes too much food. Their argument is cut short when they hear a prowler break in the front door; the room falls silent until Peter crashes into an object while trying to catch Mouschi. The startled thief grabs a typewriter and flees. A watchman summons police officers, who search the premises, but on hearing Mouschi voice a sound, they are reassured the noise was caused by a stray cat and leave.

In January 1944, Anne begins to attract Peter's attention, and Miep brings the group a luxurious cake. Van Daan asks Miep to sell Petronella's fur coat so he can buy cigarettes. Kraler warns that one of the employees asked for a raise after implying that something strange is going on in the attic. Dussel dourly comments that it is just a matter of time before they are discovered. Blaming the adults for the war that has destroyed all hope, Anne storms out of the room; Peter follows to comfort her. Anne confides her dreams of becoming a writer, and Peter voices frustration over his inability to join the war effort.

Catching Van Daan trying to steal bread, Edith denounces him, ordering his family to leave. As Dussel and Mrs. Van Daan quarrel over food, word comes over the radio of the Allied invasion of France, and Van Daan breaks into tears of shame. Heartened by the news, everyone apologizes for their harsh words. Anne dreams of being back in school by autumn.

By July 1944 the invasion bogs down, and Kraler is hospitalized with ulcers. The police have found the stolen typewriter, and Anne muses that her diary provides a way to live on after death. The Van Daans resume quarrelling, and Peter declares he cannot tolerate the situation. Anne soothes him by reminding him of the goodness of those who have come to their aid. The sirens of an approaching police van interrupt their conversation. Certain of impending arrest, they kiss. As the German police break open the bookcase entrance, Otto declares they no longer live in fear, but can go forward in hope.

In 1945, Otto relates to Miep and Kraler his long journey from Auschwitz. Learning of the deaths of Edith, Margot, the Van Daans, and Dussel, he hoped that Anne had survived until meeting a woman from Bergen-Belsen who confirmed Anne's death. Opening Anne's diary, Otto reads, "In spite of everything, I still believe that people are really good at heart," reflecting upon Anne's unshakeable optimism.

== Cast ==
- Millie Perkins as Anne Frank
- Joseph Schildkraut as Otto Frank (reprising his stage role)
- Shelley Winters as Petronella van Daan
- Richard Beymer as Peter van Daan
- Gusti Huber as Edith Frank (reprising her stage role)
- Lou Jacobi as Hans van Daan (reprising his stage role)
- Diane Baker as Margot Frank
- Douglas Spencer as Mr. Kraler
- Dodie Heath as Miep (credited as Dody Heath)
- Ed Wynn as Albert Dussel
- Orangey as Mouschi

Otto Frank wrote to Audrey Hepburn, asking her if she would play the part of his daughter Anne. He told Hepburn that his daughter would have been honoured to have such a famous Hollywood actress play her on film, and he also noted the striking resemblance that existed between Anne and Hepburn when she was an adolescent. She was initially interested in the role, and her name appears on the back cover of copies of the diary printed and sold to promote the "upcoming film".

During the casting period, Hepburn ultimately wrote back declining the offer, saying she felt she was too old, and lacked the skills to portray Anne. She said she was greatly honoured to have been given the choice, and noted the similarity between her own war experience and that of the Franks and the others in the annex. Hepburn and Anne were born within a month of each other in May and June 1929, and both spent their adolescences in Nazi-occupied Holland. In Robert Matzen’s biography of Audrey Hepburn, “Dutch Girl”, it is revealed that Hepburn may have had family members supportive of the Nazi party though Audrey Hepburn herself was not implicated in any Nazi support according to the author.

Susan Strasberg played the role on Broadway but the film role went to American newcomer Millie Perkins.

== Production ==
The film is an adaptation of the successful Broadway play based on Anne Frank's diary, which was first published in English in 1952. At the time of the film's production, the book had already sold millions of copies around the world.

According to a 1955 article published on the Daily Variety, Garson Kanin, who had staged the Broadway play, and Milton Sperling from Warner Bros. had intended to acquire the film rights, but ultimately they were sold to Buddy Adler of 20th Century-Fox. Originally, William Wyler was in talks to direct before George Stevens signed on as producer and director.

Richard Beymer, who played a key role, was signed to a long term contract at Fox.

Principal photography took place from 5 March to 11 August 1958, with additional scenes shot in November. Location work was done in Amsterdam, while the set of the annex was constructed at the 20th Century-Fox Studios in Los Angeles. George Stevens initially resisted the idea of shooting the film in CinemaScope because he thought that this format would not convey the claustrophobic effect he wanted to reproduce. When Spyros Skouras, president of 20th Century-Fox, insisted on CinemaScope, Stevens and cinematographer William C. Mellor decided to reduce the space by limiting the action to the center of the screen. Mellor further developed the look of the film by using fluorescent tubes, filters and gas rather than traditional studio lighting.

== Premiere ==
The film premiered March 18, 1959, at the Palace Theatre in New York City.

== Reception ==
=== Box office ===
The film's box office performance was described as "disappointing".

=== Critical reception ===
The film was mostly positively received by critics. On the review aggregator website Rotten Tomatoes, 81% of 21 critics' reviews are positive, with an average rating of 7.2/10. Metacritic, which uses a weighted average, assigned the film a score of 59 out of 100, based on 10 critics, indicating "mixed or average" reviews.

IMDb listed the film's 9 Wins and 14 nominations from the Academy Awards, the Golden Globes, the Directors Guild of America, the Laurel Awards, the Moscow International Film Festival, the National Board of Review (USA), the Writers Guild of America, and the International Film Music Critics Association.

Variety, in its review on December 31, 1958, stated: "The Diary of Anne Frank...is a film of often extraordinary quality. It manages, within the framework of a tense and tragic situation, to convey the beauty of a young and inquiring spirit that soars beyond the cramped confinement of the Frank family's hideout in Nazi-occupied Amsterdam.

"And yet, with all its technical perfection, the inspired direction and the sensitivity with which many of the scenes are handled, Diary is simply too long. Everything possible is done to keep the action moving within its narrow, cluttered space, and a remarkable balance is achieved between stark terror and comedy relief, yet there are moments when the film lags and the dialog becomes forced. Unlike the play, the picture leaves too little to the imagination."

Of Shelley Winters, the Academy Award winner for Best Supporting Actress, Variety stated: "As the Van Daan couple, Shelley Winters and Lou Jacobi come up with vivid characterizations that score on all levels."

In his New York Times review on March 19, 1959, Bosley Crowther stated: "GEORGE STEVENS' motion picture rendering of "The Diary of Anne Frank" is so good, so substantially sound and eloquent of so many ideas and moods that it genuinely grieves this observer to have to come out and say that it lacks the capstone strength of spiritual splendor in the projection of the Anne Frank role. Mr. Stevens has done a superb job of putting upon the screen the basic drama and shivering authenticity of the Frances Goodrich-Albert Hackett play, which in turn caught the magnitude of drama in the real-life diary of a Jewish girl. He has brilliantly flowed a three-hour picture through an attic in Nazi-occupied Amsterdam and etched a harrowing ordeal for survival in the brave behavior of eight Jews hiding there.

=== Accolades ===
Award	Category	Nominee(s)	Result	Ref.
Academy Awards	Best Motion Picture	George Stevens	Nominated	
Academy Awards	Best Director	George Stevens	Nominated	
Academy Awards	Best Supporting Actor	Ed Wynn	Nominated	
Academy Awards	Best Supporting Actress	Shelley Winters	Won	
Academy Awards	Best Art Direction – Black-and-White	Art Direction: Lyle R. Wheeler and George W. Davis; Set Decoration: Walter M. Scott and Stuart A. Reiss	Won	
Academy Awards	Best Cinematography – Black-and-White	William C. Mellor	Won	
Academy Awards	Best Costume Design – Black-and-White	Charles LeMaire and Mary Wills	Nominated	
Academy Awards	Best Scoring of a Dramatic or Comedy Picture	Alfred Newman	Nominated	
Cannes Film Festival	Palme d'Or	George Stevens	Nominated	
David di Donatello Awards	Golden Plate		Won	
Directors Guild of America Awards	Outstanding Directorial Achievement in Motion Pictures	George Stevens	Nominated	
Golden Globe Awards	Best Motion Picture – Drama		Nominated	
Golden Globe Awards	Best Actor in a Motion Picture – Drama	Joseph Schildkraut	Nominated	
Golden Globe Awards	Best Supporting Actress – Motion Picture	Shelley Winters	Nominated	
Golden Globe Awards	Best Director – Motion Picture	George Stevens	Nominated	
Golden Globe Awards	Most Promising Newcomer – Female	Diane Baker	Nominated	
Golden Globe Awards	Best Film Promoting International Understanding		Won	
Laurel Awards	Top Female Supporting Performance	Shelley Winters	Won	
Laurel Awards	Top Score	Alfred Newman	Nominated	
Moscow International Film Festival	Grand Prix	George Stevens	Nominated	
National Board of Review Awards	Top Ten Films		4th Place	
Photoplay Awards	Photoplay Award for Most Promising Female Star	Millie Perkins	Won	
Writers Guild of America Awards	Best Written American Drama	Frances Goodrich and Albert Hackett	Won	

- The American Film Institute included the film as No. 18 in its list of the most inspiring movies, AFI's 100 Years... 100 Cheers.
- In 1975, Shelley Winters donated her Academy Award for Best Supporting Actress statuette to the Anne Frank House in Amsterdam where it is on display.

== Home media ==
The film was first released on DVD on February 3, 2004. The special features included some of the following; "The Diary of Anne Frank: Echoes From the Past" featurette, a press conference with director George Stevens, MovieTone news announcing public appearances by Millie Perkins, a screen test, and an audio commentary by Millie Perkins and George Stevens Jr, the director's son.

A fiftieth-anniversary edition of the film was released on DVD and Blu-ray on June 16, 2009, three months after its actual release anniversary, in commemoration of what would have been Anne Frank's 80th birthday. It included seven major new featurettes: three cast interviews, a behind-the scenes look at the score, two short documentaries about George Stevens' memories from the war and the history of the diary, and a perspective piece on the film's legacy by Thomas Rothman.

The Blu-ray was released only a month before Tony van Renterghem died on July 19, 2009. Renterghem, a Dutch cinematographer and technical, historical and script adviser who worked with Stevens for many years, consulted on both the play and the film. While his work was almost entirely behind the scenes, his knowledge helped in putting together the historical featurettes.

== See also ==
- List of American films of 1959
- List of Holocaust films
