= Rhubarb (1951 film) =

1951 film by Arthur Lubin

- Directed by: Arthur Lubin
- Written by: David Stern
- Screenplay by: Dorothy Davenport; Francis M. Cockrell
- Based on: Rhubarb by H. Allen Smith
- Produced by: William Perlberg; George Seaton
- Starring: Ray Milland; Jan Sterling; Gene Lockhart
- Cinematography: Lionel Lindon
- Edited by: Alma Macrorie
- Music by: Van Cleave
- Distributed by: Paramount Pictures
- Release date: August 30, 1951 (New York)
- Running time: 94 minutes
- Country: United States
- Language: English
- Box office: $1,450,000

Rhubarb is a 1951 screwball comedy film adapted from the 1946 novel Rhubarb by humorist H. Allen Smith. The film was directed by Arthur Lubin and stars Ray Milland, Jan Sterling, William Frawley, Gene Lockhart and a cat named Orangey in the title role.

== Plot ==
Lonely, eccentric millionaire Thaddeus J. Banner, who owns the Brooklyn Loons baseball team, takes a dog-chasing stray cat into his home. He names the cat Rhubarb, which is baseball slang for an argument or fight.

When Banner dies, it is discovered that he had named Rhubarb as his sole beneficiary, and the cat inherits the baseball team. Team publicist Eric Yeager is named Rhubarb's guardian. Yeager's fiancée Polly Sickles, daughter of the team's manager, is terribly allergic to Rhubarb, causing many problems. Banner's spoiled, greedy and unhappy daughter Myra files a lawsuit contesting the will.

When the team's players discover that they are owned by a cat, they stage a protest until Yeager persuades them that Rhubarb brings them luck. Brooklyn begins winning and will play the powerful New York team for the championship, but a bookie who stands to lose a large sum if Brooklyn wins kidnaps the cat. The team fares poorly during the search for Rhubarb, but he escapes his captors and races to the ballpark to save the day.

== Cast ==
- Orangey as Rhubarb
- Ray Milland as Eric Yeager
- Jan Sterling as Polly Sickles
- William Frawley as Len Sickles
- Gene Lockhart as T.J. Banner
- Elsie Holmes as Myra Banner
- Taylor Holmes as P. Duncan Munk
- Willard Waterman as Orlando Dill
- Henry Slate as Dud Logan
- James Griffith as Ogelthorpe "Oggie" Meadows
- Jim Hayward as Doom
- Donald MacBride as Pheeny
- Hal K. Dawson as Mr. Fisher

== Production ==
The film is based on a 1946 book by humorist writer H. Allen Smith, his first novel. The New York Times called the book, which became a bestseller, a "rough and raucous satire".

Roy Del Ruth was interested in the film rights but stepped aside when Mike Todd expressed interest. Todd bought the film rights for $100,000 but then experienced financial troubles and was unable to pay. Smith was approached by other producers, one of whom wanted to change the cat to a dog and another who wanted the cat to inherit a burlesque house. There was no interest in the project for two years before film rights were bought by Arthur Lubin, who had recently directed Francis and was seeking another animal story.

In December 1949, it was reported that Lubin had hired Frank Cockrell to write a script based on the novel, intending to film it after finishing Francis. In January 1950, Lubin hired Dorothy Reid, with whom he had collaborated numerous times, to work on the script. Lubin later claimed that the second half of the film was written by an uncredited George Seaton.

Lubin pitched the project to Universal Pictures and several other studios, all of which declined the project. In August 1950, Lubin struck a deal with Paramount Pictures. In September, the film was assigned to a production unit at Paramount run by William Perlberg and George Seaton. That same month, Ray Milland signed to star. Strother Martin and Leonard Nimoy have uncredited roles in the film.

Producers William Perlberg and George Sutton, seeking a "Jimmy Cagney sort of cat", received more than 3,000 letters and pictures from cat owners and auditioned more than 5,000 cats for the role of Rhubarb. The producers selected Orangey, an 18-pound orange-and-white cat owned by Agnes Murray of the Sherman Oaks neighborhood of Los Angeles. Murray found Orangey, hungry and with an injured leg, in her garden in 1948 and nursed the cat back to health. Two days before filming commenced, Orangey contracted a viral infection and nearly died before being saved by veterinarian Charles H. Reid. Approximately 30 other cats appear in the film, and during filming, Reid tended to the cat actors and was given the ability to stop production at any time for the sake of the cats' health.

Lubin recalled that on the first day of filming, Orangey "deliberately bit me in the leg. I was quick enough to retaliate with a quick kick that sent me spinning. Fortunately the Humane Association representative was not looking. From then on the cat and I had a good actor-director relationship. He was cruel and nasty to everyone on set but he respected me and kept his distance."

== Reception ==
In a contemporary review for The New York Times, critic Howard Thompson wrote: "Paramount's cat has it all over Universal's jackass, Francis, being an animal content to grin wickedly and more or less keep his mouth shut, but for our money the picture is a couple of good notches below Mr. Smith's original. However, it's much sprightlier than either of the preceding mule team projects. ... But while director Arthur Lubin, who learned a thing or two since handling Francis, prods the action along for a lot of good-natured chuckles, the picture has some arid stretches and the humor is seldom as sharp and tangy as it was in the book."

The film earned an estimated $1.45 million at the American box office in 1951.

== Awards ==
Orangey won PATSY Awards (Picture Animal Top Star of the Year, the animal version of an Academy Award) for his appearances in both Rhubarb and Breakfast at Tiffany's, the only cat to win more than once.

== Home video ==
The film was released on DVD by Legend Films on July 1, 2008.

== See also ==
- List of baseball films
