= Morris the Cat =

Advertising mascot for cat food

- The original cat in the 1970s.
- First appearance: 1968
- Created by: Leo Burnett Company
- Voiced by: John Erwin

In-universe information
- Species: Domestic short-haired cat
- Gender: Male
- Nationality: American

Morris the Cat is the advertising mascot for 9Lives brand cat food, appearing on its packaging and in many of its television commercials since the 1970s.

== History ==
The character of Morris the Cat is a orange tabby tomcat who is known as "the world's most finicky cat". He exclusively eats 9Lives cat food and makes this preference clear with a humorous, sardonic voice-over commentary when offered competing brands in the commercials. Every can of 9Lives features Morris' "signature". Four different cats have played Morris the Cat over the years.

The original Morris was adopted in 1968 from the Hinsdale Humane Society, a Chicago-area animal shelter, by professional animal handler Bob Martwick. An invention of the Leo Burnett advertising company where Martwick worked, Morris was featured in 58 television commercials which aired from 1969 to 1978. John Erwin (famous for being the original voice of He-Man) provided the voice-over for the cat. Morris won two PATSY Awards (an award for animal performers in film and television) in 1972 and 1973. The original Morris died on July 7, 1978, in his native Chicago of old age.

All cats to play Morris have been rescue animals, either from an animal shelter or a cat rescue. After receiving multiple contacts from individuals who claimed that they were the original owner of Morris, Bob Martwick chose not to reveal which shelter he obtained the second Morris from. After a yearlong search, Martwick selected the second Morris, who began appearing in commercials in 1979. The first two cats to play Morris lived with Martwick as pets. Morris's popularity continued into the 1980s, with the Leo Burnett Company orchestrating a mock presidential campaign for Morris in 1988.

The current Morris lives in Los Angeles with his handler, Rose Ordile. The Leo Burnett Company parted ways with 9Lives' corporate parent Heinz in 1994.

Morris appeared in the movie Shamus with Burt Reynolds and Dyan Cannon in 1973. Morris also appears as a "spokescat" promoting responsible pet ownership, pet health and pet adoptions through animal shelters. To this end, he has "authored" three books: The Morris Approach, The Morris Method and The Morris Prescription.

Starting in 2006 for the "One Million Cat Rescue" initiative, a campaign that promoted adoption of shelter cats, a kitten lookalike of Morris named "Li'l Mo" was introduced as Morris' that he "adopted". He has been used intermittently over the years, most recently starting in 2025, where he has been used on the packaging for 9Lives kitten food.

== See also ==
- List of individual cats
