= William Cruikshank =

William Cruikshank may refer to:

- William Cumberland Cruikshank (1745–1800), English anatomist
- William Cruikshank (painter) (1848–1922), Scottish painter
- William Cruickshank (chemist) (died 1810/11), chemist
- William M. Cruikshank (1870–1943), American military officer
