= Nancy Cruickshank =

British entrepreneur

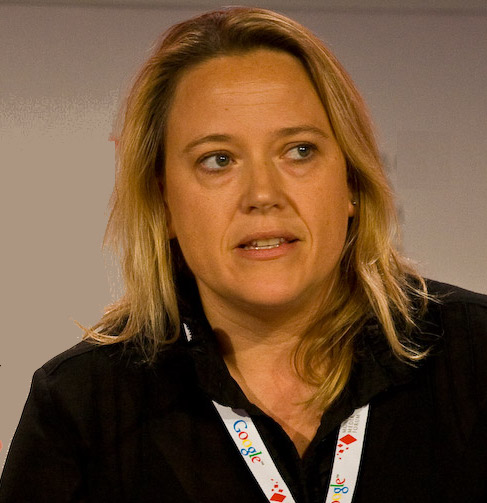
- Cruickshank in 2008
- Born: London
- Occupations: CDO, Carlsberg Group A/S
- Years active: 2000–present

Nancy Cruickshank is a British entrepreneur in beauty, fashion, and technology. She has founded three start-ups and helped launch several others. Since 2018, she is the Chief Digital Officer at Carlsberg group A/S.

== Early life and education ==
Nancy Cruickshank was born in London. Her father worked for Revlon and, when she was 11, her parents moved to Hong Kong while she attended a boarding school. She graduated from the University of Leeds with a degree in history.

== Career ==
Cruickshank began her career at Condé Nast in magazine and advertising sales. In 1995 she was named commercial director of Condé Nast online and helped launch the publisher's titles online, including Vogue and GQ. In April 2000 she and her husband, Jim, launched a property site, Smove.com.

Cruickshank joined Handbag.com in 2000, as Managing Director and 'Founder' of the media business that she joined to take forward. The business was originally founded in 1999 by Dominic Riley, and provided email, internet access and operated as a portal with links to many women's websites. By 2014, Handbag had grown to be the number-one fashion and beauty website in the UK, with 1.5 million visits monthly. Cruickshank sold the Handbag Publishing Group to the National Magazine Company, a member of the Hearst Group, in 2006 for a reported £22 million. After staying on as managing director for another year, she became CEO of VideoJug, a "how-to video website", in October 2007. In March 2009 she was named executive director of digital development for the Telegraph Media Group.

From April 2012 to March 2013 she served as launch CEO of Weve, a media and mobile commerce joint venture for UK mobile operators.

In June 2012 Cruickshank, together with Kate Shapland, Rodrigo Dauster, and Olivier Beau de Loménie, launched MyShowcase.com. This direct-sales retailer promotes 25 beauty brands through home showings led by MyShowcase salespeople; products are also sold online.

== Other activities ==
Cruickshank served for many years as a board member of the Cosmetic Executive Women trade organisation. In 2013 she became an independent non-executive director for the TelecityGroup. In 2014 she was named an independent director of OnMobile.

== Personal ==
Cruickshank met her husband, Jim, at the University of Leeds when they were both 19. They married in 1997 and have two daughters. They maintain homes in London, Copenhagen and Surrey, which they live between throughout the year with their children and two dogs.
