= Clive Cruickshanks =

South African cricketer

Personal information
- Born: 22 October 1908; Port Elizabeth, South Africa
- Died: 22 January 1994 (aged 85); Randburg, South Africa
- Source: Cricinfo, 17 December 2020

Clive Cruickshanks (22 October 1908 – 22 January 1994) was a South African cricketer. He played in seven first-class matches for Eastern Province from 1931/32 to 1934/35.

== See also ==
- List of Eastern Province representative cricketers
