= Jessica Huie =

Jessica Huie MBE
- Born: 20 March 1980 (age 45); Paddington, London
- Occupation: Entrepreneur
- Years active: 1997 - present
- Website: www.jhpr.co.uk

Jessica Urcella Huie MBE (born 20 March 1980, in Paddington, London) is the founder of multicultural greeting card company, Color blind cards and JH Public Relations.

== Personal life ==
Huie was born in Paddington (London, UK) to an English mother and Jamaican father.

== Career ==
Huie's first role in the media sector was at the age of 17 when she began working as an office junior for Connie Filipello Publicity. In 1999 Huie joined Max Clifford Associates as a press consultant, completing an internship while studying a degree in journalism, and then joining the firm as a public relations consultant - a role she held from 2004-2008. Huie has worked as a freelance reporter specialising in entertainment news for a variety of organisations, including BBC London Radio (Amina Taylor Show), Choice FM (Dave VJ Show), Pride Magazine and the Sunday Mirror / Daily Mirror. In 2006 Huie founded Color blind cards - the first greeting card company to supply mainstream greeting card retailers in the UK with cards that celebrated racial and ethnic diversity. In 2009 Huie expanded the presence of the business into South Africa, and then in 2013 the business also expanded into the US market.

On her departure from Max Clifford Associates in 2008, Huie founded JH Public Relations - an agency providing public relations services to celebrities, entrepreneurs, and high-profile brands. She was part of a round table on enterprise with former Prime Minister Gordon Brown. She was a franchisee of Forward Ladies.

Huie has performed a number of public speaking engagements and was presenter of the Precious Awards for women of colour in business 2010-2012.

She was appointed Member of the Order of the British Empire (MBE) in the 2014 Birthday Honours for services to entrepreneurship and positive influence on community. Huie is an active public speaker and ambassador for youth, enterprise and social mobility, giving her time at numerous schools, entrepreneurial organisations and charities. In 2014 JH Public Relations partnered with Kruger Cowne Talent Management agency, whose clients include Bob Geldof, Boris Becker, Lily Cole, Amanda Wakeley and Emmanuel Jal.

== Awards ==
- Glamour Magazine 'Power List' March 2011
- Courvoisier Future 500, June 2009
- Winner of Daily Mail's Enterprising Young Brit, Nov 2007
- Red Magazine ’35 under 35’ 2010
- Evening Standard Inspirational Entrepreneur, Jan 2007
- Precious Entrepreneur of the Year, Nov 2007
- Best Start-up, European Federation of Black Women Business Owners, Dec 2007
- Observer's Entrepreneurs to watch, Jan 2008
- Became Fellow of the RSA 2013
- National Diversity Award 2013
- MBE 2014
