= The New Andy Griffith Show =

American sitcom TV series (1971)

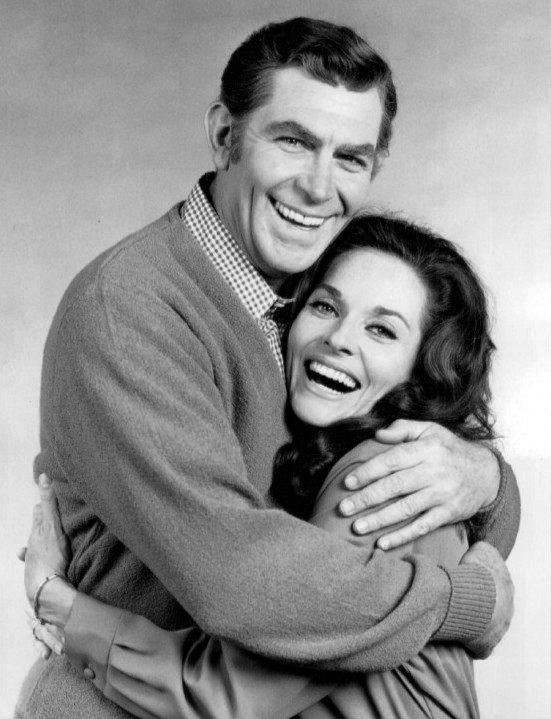
- Andy Griffith and Lee Meriwether, 1971.
- Genre: Sitcom
- Created by: Aaron Ruben
- Written by: James Fritzell; Everett Greenbaum; Aaron Ruben
- Directed by: Lee Philips
- Starring: Andy Griffith; Lee Meriwether; Ann Morgan Guilbert; Lori Rutherford; Marty McCall
- Composer: Earle Hagen
- Country of origin: United States
- Original language: English
- No. of seasons: 1
- No. of episodes: 10

Production
- Executive producer: Richard O. Linke
- Producer: Aaron Ruben
- Cinematography: Wilfred M. Cline
- Editor: James Galloway
- Camera setup: Multi-camera
- Running time: 22–24 minutes
- Production company: ADA Productions

Original release
- Network: CBS
- Release: January 8 – May 21, 1971

The New Andy Griffith Show is an American sitcom that was broadcast in the United States on CBS in 1971 on Fridays at 8:30 ET. It debuted on January 8, 1971, and ended on May 21, 1971.

== History ==
Actor Andy Griffith had left his first sitcom, The Andy Griffith Show, voluntarily after the 1967–68 season while it was still number one in the Nielsen ratings and despite a high-dollar offer from CBS to continue it, in order to pursue his other interests, singing and motion picture acting, and to prevent his being typecast solely as a rural Southern sheriff.

When he decided to return to network television two years later, in the fall of 1970, it was in Headmaster, a drama, in which he played the headmaster of an exclusive California private school. That program lasted just 13 weeks, and Griffith replaced it immediately with this one, which was much closer in tone and content to his earlier, more successful role (also sharing some writers and music director Earle Hagen), and this program replaced Headmaster on the CBS Friday night schedule effective January 8, 1971.

== Synopsis ==
Griffith portrays Andy Sawyer, who upon returning to his hometown is immediately installed as the new Mayor pro tem. The series is set in the fictional small city of Greenwood, North Carolina, with a population slightly under 13,000 residents and thus noticeably larger than Mayberry.

Andy Sawyer was the model family man, always agreeable and understanding, spending much quality time with his children. His character bore more of the folksy attitude Griffith had previously portrayed in early episodes of The Andy Griffith Show and the 1958 teleplay and film No Time for Sergeants.

Lee Meriwether was cast as Andy's wife, reprising a pairing of the two from the 1969 film Angel in My Pocket. Marty McCall and Lori Rutherford were seen as Griffith's children, T.J. and Lori, respectively, while Ann Morgan Guilbert portrayed Lee's sister Nora, a live-in relative who was constantly complaining, neurotic, meddling and superstitious. Rotund country comic Glen Ash was cast as town councilman Buff McKnight. Ruth McDevitt played Mrs. Gossage.

== Reception ==
The premiere episode was a major success for CBS, buoyed by guest appearances by The Andy Griffith Show regulars Don Knotts, George Lindsey and Paul Hartman. Lindsey and Hartman explicitly played "Goober" and "Emmett", their characters on both The Andy Griffith Show and Mayberry R.F.D. (still on the air at the time); this is confirmed in both dialogue and in the closing credits. Knotts, meanwhile, played an unnamed character who was identical in mannerisms to Barney Fife of The Andy Griffith Show. All three characters were "old friends" of the character Andy Sawyer; they dropped by his new house, ostensibly to welcome him to town, but actually to seek political favors. These Mayberry characters treated Andy Sawyer exactly as if he were Andy Taylor, and the two characters had similar backstories: both Andys by this point were married and had two children (although Taylor's two sons, Opie and infant Andy Jr., were both boys as opposed to Sawyer's one boy and one girl), and prior to the start of The New Andy Griffith Show, both were living in larger cities.

Overall, the introduction of characters from Mayberry along with the similarities in character, writing, music and show title gave the appearance that the show was an alternate version of Griffith's earlier show, only with some names and details changed, creating confusion. Griffith also blamed the bad reputation of Headmaster for making it more difficult for The New Andy Griffith Show to succeed. Coincidentally, CBS had a public desire to overhaul its image to appeal to wealthier, more sophisticated audiences, which left the network less eager to promote rural sitcoms that previously had been a network staple.

Although the premiere gathered respectable ratings, viewership quickly declined over the next several weeks, and after ten episodes, CBS canceled the series on March 12, 1971. These ten episodes repeated through May 21, then were replaced with reruns of Headmaster during the summer.

== Episodes ==
No.	Title	Directed by	Written by	Original release date
1	"My Friend, the Mayor"	Lee Philips	Aaron Ruben	January 8, 1971
2	"Get Me Glen Campbell"	Lee Philips	James Fritzell & Everett Greenbaum	January 15, 1971
3	"Berries, T.J. and the Law"	Unknown	Unknown	January 22, 1971
4	"Town Square"	Elliott Lewis	James Fritzell & Everett Greenbaum	January 29, 1971
5	"Nearly Nuptials For Nora"	Unknown	Unknown	February 5, 1971
6	"Otis Burfoot Is A Hundred Years Old"	Unknown	Unknown	February 12, 1971
7	"Big Noise, Small Claims"	Unknown	Unknown	February 19, 1971
8	"The Connection"	Unknown	Unknown	February 26, 1971
9	"The Millionth Visitor Is A Bum – Or Is He?"	Unknown	Aaron Ruben	March 5, 1971
10	"A Visit From Cousin Billy Jim"	Unknown	Unknown	March 12, 1971
