= Headmaster (TV series) =

American drama TV series (1970–1971)

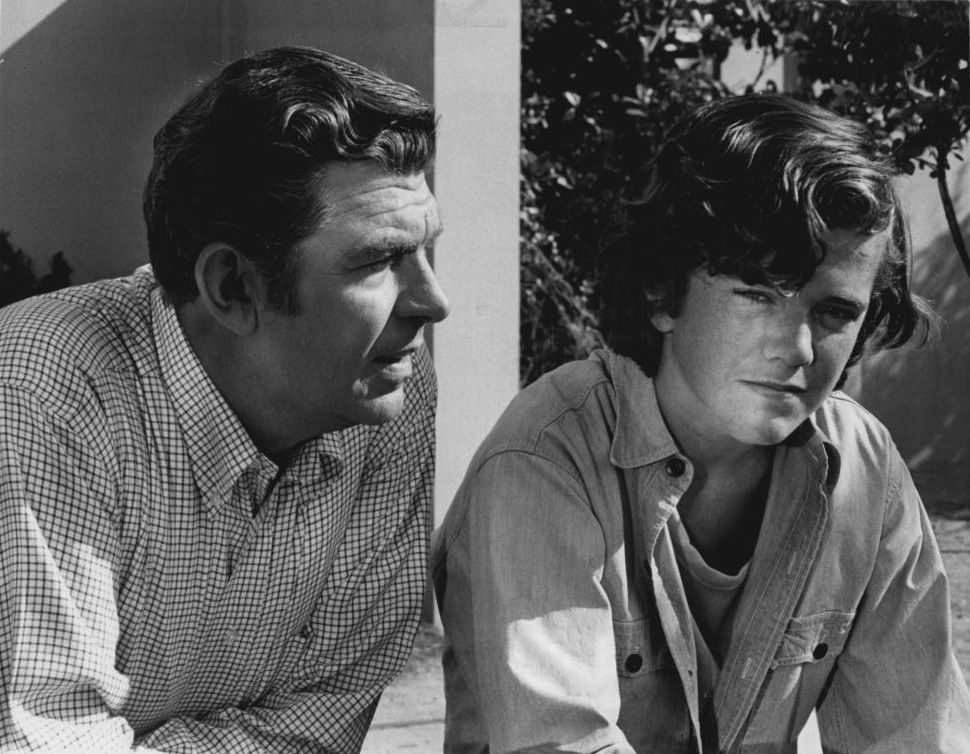
- Griffith with guest star Butch Patrick in the pilot episode "May I Turn On?"
- Created by: Aaron Ruben
- Starring: Andy Griffith; Jerry Van Dyke; Claudette Nevins; Parker Fennelly
- Theme music composer: Patrick Williams; Kelly Gordon
- Opening theme: "Only a Man", sung by Linda Ronstadt
- Composer: Patrick Williams
- Country of origin: United States
- No. of seasons: 1
- No. of episodes: 14

Production
- Executive producer: Richard O. Linke
- Producer: Aaron Ruben
- Running time: 30 minutes
- Production company: ADA Productions

Original release
- Network: CBS
- Release: September 18, 1970 – January 1, 1971

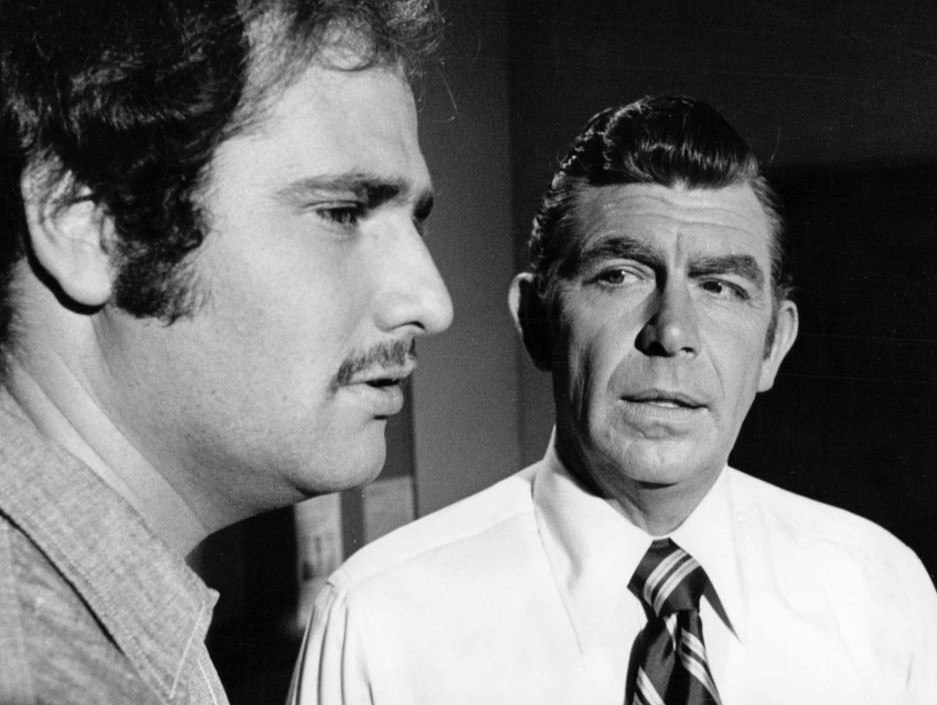
Rob Reiner with Griffith in episode "Valerie Has an Emotional Gestalt for the Teacher" (1970)

Headmaster is an American half-hour television comedy-drama starring Andy Griffith and broadcast by CBS in the United States during the 1970–71 season.

== Griffith returns to TV ==
Headmaster marked the return to series television of Griffith, whose previous eponymous show had been one of CBS's major hits of the 1960s prior to his voluntary departure and a program which was still in production (as Mayberry R.F.D.), when Headmaster was launched. Griffith had just signed a three-picture deal with Universal Pictures but was so disappointed with the first film in the contract, the rural comedy Angel in My Pocket, that the two parties never made the other two films and he quickly returned to television.

With Headmaster, Griffith fulfilled his desire to be cast in a television series as something other than a rural bumpkin dispensing folksy wisdom; here his character, Andy Thompson, was the headmaster of a prestigious California private school, the Concord School. His wife, Margaret (Claudette Nevins), was an English teacher. Two other cast members from Angel in My Pocket joined Griffith on Headmaster: Parker Fennelly essentially reprised his role as a caretaker, here named Mr. Purdy, and Jerry Van Dyke played the role of athletic coach Jerry Brownell, Thompson's best friend. The show's theme song was performed by Linda Ronstadt.

== Reception ==
Headmaster was given a favorable time slot, Friday at 8:30 p.m. Eastern Time, which had most recently been occupied by the hit sitcom Hogan's Heroes—but the program proved to be, by Griffith's own admission, "a very bad show" and was routinely beaten in the Nielsen ratings by both The Partridge Family on ABC and The Name of the Game on NBC. Production of the show was terminated after just 14 episodes, with the last first-run episode being broadcast January 1, 1971.

CBS (and sponsor Bristol-Myers) had spent some $3.5 million (roughly $25 million in 2022 money) to bring Andy Griffith back to television, and expected a whole season's worth of episodes, so Headmaster was hurriedly replaced by a new situation comedy, The New Andy Griffith Show. The "new" program was practically a carbon copy of Griffith's old one, complete with a North Carolina setting and even guest appearances by Andy Griffith Show regulars Don Knotts, George Lindsey and Paul Hartman in the first episode. However, it met with little more success than Headmaster, and it was cancelled after only ten airings, the last on May 21, 1971. (Also cashiered by CBS were former staples The Beverly Hillbillies, Green Acres and Hee-Haw, as part of the network's infamous "rural purge".) In June, Headmaster returned to the time slot in reruns for the summer, with the last repeat episode being aired on September 10, 1971.

== Availability ==
Viewing this series now is a rarity, despite the big-name lead. Having not been re-aired again since its 1971 summer repeats, no full episodes of Headmaster are available to view online, even on sites such as YouTube (even as some episodes of The New Andy Griffith Show can be found online). Only a few related clips of the show are available, though mostly promotional material such as a 1970 CBS Fall Preview promo featuring Griffith explaining the series, a 16mm 20-second commercial, and the opening credits sequence featuring the Linda Ronstadt theme song. As of 2026, the series has had no DVD release, did not show up in syndication, and is seldom available to private collectors. One episode, "One for the Gipper," is archived in the collection at the Paley Center for Media.

== Episode list ==
| No. | Title | Original release date |
|---|---|---|
| 1 | "May I Turn On?" | September 18, 1970 |
Series pilot.
| 2 | "The Battle of the Mini" | September 25, 1970 |
| 3 | "Valerie Has an Emotional Gestalt for the Teacher" | October 2, 1970 |
| 4 | "Bridge That Gap" | October 9, 1970 |
| 5 | "One for the Gipper" | October 16, 1970 |
| 6 | "Will the Real Mother of Tony Landis . . ." | October 23, 1970 |
| 7 | "The Experiment" | October 30, 1970 |
| 8 | "Nobody's Perfect" | November 6, 1970 |
| 9 | "Bach Rock" | November 13, 1970 |
| 10 | "Let's Try It Mr. Hiller's Way" | November 20, 1970 |
| 11 | "Harvard or Bust" | November 27, 1970 |
| 12 | "Count the Ways I Love You" | December 4, 1970 |
| 13 | "Romeo & Juliet & Gary & Hilary" | December 18, 1970 |
| 14 | "Guess Who's Not Coming to Dinner" | January 1, 1971 |
