= List of Mayberry R.F.D. episodes =

The following is a list of episodes for the CBS television series Mayberry R.F.D., which is a spin-off of The Andy Griffith Show. It aired for three seasons between 1968 and 1971.

== Series overview ==
Season	Episodes	Originally released		Rank	Rating
Season	Episodes	First released	Last released	Rank	Rating
Pilot	1	April 1, 1968		—N/a	—N/a
1	26	September 23, 1968	May 12, 1969	4	25.4
2	26	September 22, 1969	April 13, 1970	4	24.4
3	26	September 14, 1970	March 29, 1971	15	22.3

== Episodes ==
=== Pilot (1968) ===
No. overall	No. in season	Title	Directed by	Written by	Original release date
249 (Note: "No. in series" and "No. in season" for the pilot dictate the airing and location of the episode within the parent series.)	30	"Mayberry R.F.D."	Peter Baldwin	Bob Ross	April 1, 1968
Andy runs into Sam at the train station. Sam tells Andy that his friend Mario Vincente (Gabriele Tinti), who he met while stationed in Italy during the war, is coming to help out on the farm. The train arrives, and apparently Mario brought his father and sister Sophia (Letícia Román) along without telling Sam first. Sam reluctantly agrees to let the family stay with him. Sam stops in town to pick up groceries and the family meets Goober and Howard. At the farm, Papa drives Sam's tractor into the barn door, destroying the door. Sam's housekeeper, Mrs. Fletcher (Almira Sessions), is not happy about Sophia being in the kitchen and quits. The family are constantly yelling at each other in Italian and it's driving Sam crazy. Sam tells Andy that there are a lot a farms run by Italians in Ciler City and maybe they'd be happier there. Goober tries to teach Papa checkers, but it doesn't go to well. Aunt Bee, Helen and Clara come to meet Sophia and have a nice time. That night Andy takes Sam to the Town Hall meeting. Aunt Bee introduces the Vincente family to the towns people. Mario tells the people how happy they are to be in Mayberry and everyone applauds. Sam is asked to speak and he winds up saying that he knows things will work out with the family staying with him.

=== Season 1 (1968–69) ===
No. overall	No. in season	Title	Directed by	Written by	Original release date
1	1	"Andy and Helen Get Married"	Christian Nyby	John McGreevey	September 23, 1968
Andy and Helen are finally getting married and Andy is having his Bachelor party. The couple will honeymoon in Florida and Goober will be acting Sheriff. Opie will be on a camping trip and Aunt Bee is planning to leave Mayberry and live with her sister out-of-state. Sam asks Aunt Bee to move onto the farm with him and Mike, but she says her plans are made. It is the day of the wedding and Barney is best man. The happy couple leave for their honeymoon. Something the Reverend (William Keene) says leads Aunt Bee to change her mind about Sam's offer. But farm life might take some getting used to. Meanwhile, Howard reads a postcard from Andy to Goober and Emmett. Aunt Bee decides farm life isn't for her and Sam takes her large luggage out to the car. After speaking to Mike and looking at family pictures, Aunt Bee decides to overcome her fears and stay at the farm. We see Andy singing to Helen and then Barney is there as well. Andy Griffith, Ron Howard, Aneta Corsaut and Don Knotts guest star.
2	2	"The Harvest Ball"	Christian Nyby	Bob Mosher	September 30, 1968
The annual Harvest Ball is soon and the men are asking each other who they're going to take. Goober would like to take Millie Swanson (Arlene Golonka), but is having a hard time asking her. Emmett writes a letter to Millie for Goober. Meanwhile, Sam would like to ask Millie to the ball as well. Goober asks Sam to rewrite Emmett's letter and Sam finds out it is to Millie. Sam has to run an errand before he can finish Goober's letter. Millie comes to Sam's office and sees the letter. She is excited because she likes Sam. Millie gets the letter in the mail but is disappointed when she sees it is from Goober. Millie's friend Dorothy (Stefanianna Christopherson) is there when she reads the letter and says what a nice guy Goober is. Millie shows up to the ball with Goober. Sam is able to get a dance with Millie and Goober can see she would rather be with Sam. Goober tells Sam what he sensed and says it is OK. Goober leaves and runs into Dorothy and senses she likes him. Sam and Millie see Goober and Dorothy walking off arm in arm.
3	3	"The Race Horse"	Christian Nyby	Henry Garson & Edmund Beloin	October 7, 1968
Sam's cousin, Vince (Jack Grimes), is coming to visit. He used to be a jockey but now he trains horses. The next day Vince arrives with a horse named Gingersnap. Vince says that the horse has not lived up to its potential as a race horse. He's looking to sell the horse to finance a restaurant he wants to partner in and was hoping Sam could find a buyer. Aunt Bee thinks it is a shame to turn Gingersnap into a saddle horse. Emmett tells Sam that Mr. Bowers (Byron Morrow) might be interested in the horse. But Aunt Bee manages to intentionally ruin the deal. She tells Sam her intuition tells her to put the horse in a race. Sam reluctantly agrees. Aunt Bee sets things up and gets the horse into a race at Morgan Downs. The day of the race, Aunt Bee gives the Jockey (Lou Wagner) a pep talk. After the race starts, Gingersnap is in last position. The horse comes from behind to win. When Vince hears the good news, he decides to keep Gingersnap. Judson Pratt as Brice.
4	4	"Help on the Farm"	Christian Nyby	Dick Bensfield & Perry Grant	October 14, 1968
The corn crop is coming in and Sam needs to hire someone to help him. Andy (Guest star Andy Griffith) suggests using ex-prisoners from the county prison. The warden has a program to help the men get another chance at life. Sam talks to Aunt Bee and she reluctantly agrees. Andy introduces Sam to Harry "Lucky" Davis (Herbie Faye) and Charley "Fingers" Wilson. The men start picking corn and after awhile, Sam gives them some money to run a few errands in his truck. They stop at Goober's gas station. Millie tells them that Goober's not there and they should just help themselves. Then you're supposed to leave the money in a tin can by the pump. They stop at Emmett's fix-it shop to pick something up for Sam. Emmett has to leave and he asks the men to watch his store. He shows them where the money is in case someone picks something up. Meanwhile, Millie drops off a little more than $500 to Aunt Bee. The women's club collected it for a swimming pool and Aunt Bee hides it in a cookie jar. The men find the money while getting a cookie, but put it back when they hear Sam and Aunt Bee. Sam and Aunt Bee bring the men to church. Afterwards, the men head home before Sam and Aunt Bee. Later, Sam and Aunt Bee find the money and car gone. Harry and Charley go to play cards with Big Louie (Dan Seymour). Andy and Sam show up and Harry and Charley say they were just trying to win the rest of the money for the pool. Big Louie gives Andy an additional $500 for the pool. Val Bisoglio as Aces.
5	5	"The Copy Machine"	Christian Nyby	Burt Styler	October 21, 1968
Mike has sent away for a lot of magazines and catalogues. Mike sees in one of the catalogs a silver vase that he would like to get for Aunt Bee's birthday. Mailman Mr. Felton (Norman Leavitt) drops off a package for Mike. It seems Mike accidentally ordered a copy machine from Amalgamated Copy Machine Co. There's a 10-day free home trial. Mike decides to go into business with his friend Harold and make copies for people in town. He hopes to make enough money to buy Aunt Bee's gift. Ernie Newhouser (Carl Ballantine), from Amalgamated, shows up at Sam's house. Sam figures out that Mike must have sent for the machine. Sam manages to put off Ernie and then goes to talk to Mike. Sam makes Mike send the machine back. On the way to the post office, Harold tells Mike about a large order that would give him enough money for the gift. Mike figures he'll fill the order and then mail it back. But he trips over the cord and damages the machine, but it still works. Mike takes the machine to Emmett's, but he can't fix it. He then tries to get a bank loan from Cyrus Tankersley (George Cisar) with no luck. Sam finds out about the machine and gets upset. Harold tells Sam that Mike used the machine again so he could buy Aunt Bee's gift. Understanding what Mike went through, Sam tells him he'll keep the machine.
6	6	"The Panel Show"	Hal Cooper	Joseph Bonaduce	October 28, 1968
Sam receives a letter from Jackson Television Productions. Their debate program will discuss which is better, big city or small town life. They request two citizens to come to New York City, all expenses paid. Representing New York will be writer Harding Capehart and socialite Pamela Mason. The City Council pick Emmett and Howard to defend the honor of all small towns across America. The men arrive in New York and experience the hustle and bustle of the big city. Emmett calls and Sam reminds them to prepare for the debate. It is the night of the show and people gather at Sam's office to watch the show. Clara is concerned about Howard not doing well. The show begins with moderator Mr. Jackson introducing the panelists. The folks are stunned when they see Howard dressed in Hippie attire. Howard then concedes many of the points that the city representatives make. Emmett and the folks at home start to get frustrated with Howard's reactions. Howard returns to Mayberry an outcast and admits he got carried away on his first trip to New York. Sam holds another Council Meeting. Sam sent a Manhattan newspaper an apologetic poem Howard had written about Mayberry. The paper prints the poem and Sam reads it to the Council. Everyone then forgives Howard. Joseph V. Perry as Cabbie.
7	7	"Youth Takes Over"	Hal Cooper	Jim Brooks	November 11, 1968
Andy and Sam think it would be a good idea to have a "Civic Youth Day". They would have some children take over as Sheriff, Head of City Council and County Clerk. But just for a few hours. Mike is chosen to be Sheriff, Arnold Bailey will be Head of City Council and Martin Barton will be County Clerk. The boys study for two weeks about their jobs. On the day, Sam, Andy and Howard quickly find out that the boys know quite a bit about the jobs. Later at a luncheon, the boys are to tell what they learned that morning. The boys don't have much to say. Sam apologizes because the men really didn't give the boys the added knowledge that they obviously wanted. The boys clearly embraced their roles with far more enthusiasm than anyone thought. Charles Lampkin as Ralph Barton. Stuart Nisbet as Frank Bailey Andy Griffith guest stars.
8	8	"The Church Play"	Christian Nyby	John McGreevey	November 18, 1968
Howard tells the church committee that the church is in need of funds. The problem is with the annual charity play. Income has fallen off steadily for years. Howard believes the problem is that Clara, the producer, hasn't kept up with the times. Clara is not happy when she is told she will be replaced. Because she has a little theater experience, Millie is offered the job to direct "Sleeping Beauty". An old friend of Millie's named Nick (Jay Lawrence) comes to town. He offers her a good job in a dance production in Raleigh. Millie wants to stay in Mayberry and turns him down. Clara overhears this. Clara tells the church committee that Millie used to be a chorus girl. The Reverend suggests replacing Millie, but Sam vouches for her. Sam talks to Millie and she admits to once being a chorus girl. It is the night of the play and the show is running smoothly. The Reverend and Sam think everything will be OK. Then the play ends with Mike singing "A Pretty Girl Is Like a Melody" and the girls do a chorus line fan dance. The audience loved it. Jodie Foster has a small role as the Fairy.
9	9	"Mike's Losing Streak"	Christian Nyby	Perry Grant & Dick Bensfield	December 2, 1968
The town is excited about the Baseball Class "A" Excursion. While buying his ticket, Goober complains to Sam and Andy about the contents of the box lunch that will be included. Mike is excited to be going to the game. Sam becomes upset with Mike for losing a second jacket in less than 10 days. Mike has also lost several other items lately. Sam tells him that if he loses one more thing, he can't go to the game. Mike is playing baseball with some friends and he loses his watch. Mike tells Sam what happened and Mike knows he can't go to the game. Sam feels bad about enforcing his rule. It doesn't help that many townspeople are giving him a hard time about it. Andy gives Sam an idea of how he might be able to let Mike go to the game. Sam buys a similar watch and then sets it up so Mike can find it. While watching the game, Mike finds his original watch in his baseball glove. Mike realizes what his father did for him. Vince Barnett as Elmo. Andy Griffith guest stars.
10	10	"Sam Gets a Ticket"	Hal Cooper	Elroy Schwartz	December 9, 1968
Mike comes home late because he got into trouble at school. The teacher thought he was peeking at a girl's answers, but he was just borrowing an eraser. He is almost done writing "I will not peak" 100 times on the board and has to finish it the next day. Sam thinks Mike should assert himself and tell the teacher he did nothing wrong. Sam drives Aunt Bee to Mount Pilot and is stopped by Officer George Hopkins (Don Wilbanks). The Officer says Sam didn't signal when making a turn. Aunt Bee insists that Sam did make the signal, but Sam gets a ticket anyway. Aunt Bee tells Sam to fight it in court, but Sam would just as soon pay the ticket. Back at home, Mike reminds Sam of what he told him. In court, Officer Hopkins presents his side of the story. Aunt Bee testifies and then Goober gets up and says that the electrical system in Sam's car is working perfectly. Sam is then questioned by Prosecutor McComb (Don Keefer) and is found guilty by the Judge (Bill Quinn). But something Sam later realizes gets the Judge to change his mind. Clinton Sundberg as Salesman. Sam Edwards as Clerk.
11	11	"Emmett's 50th Birthday Party"	Hal Cooper	Perry Grant & Dick Bensfield	December 16, 1968
Mailman Felton (Norman Leavitt) delivers a bunch of birthday cards to Emmett. Emmett tells Goober and Howard that he's going to be 50. The men tease Emmett a little bit about his age. Martha wants to throw a birthday party for him, but Emmett is against it. Realizing that Emmett is getting sensitive about his age, Goober and Howard try to cheer him up. After getting directions from Emmett, a guy (Bruce Mars) on a motorcycle says "Thanks Gramps". Emmett then gets a blank card from a fortune machine. Emmett now feels worse. While looking through a movie magazine, Millie mentions to Emmett that Cary Grant is in his 60s. Now Emmett doesn't feel so bad about his age. He has a spring in his step and tells Martha he now wants a party. Emmett goes wild at his party. The next morning, he is all worn out. Sam comes by and the two have a talk that puts things in perspective.
12	12	"Miss Farmerette"	Hal Cooper	Joseph Bonaduce	December 23, 1968
At the county fair, Howard and Goober meet Roscoe (Ned Glass), who booked a dog act there. He's unhappy that he no longer books people. Roscoe tells Carl Conover (Gil Lamb), who runs the dog act, that he still has connections in Hollywood. Sam, who is the emcee, announces it is time to crown Miss Farmerette who will be queen of the fair. The winner winds up being Millie and Roscoe is impressed with her looks. The next day, Roscoe comes to Mayberry and tells Millie he wants to make her a movie star. Millie doesn't think she has what it takes. Roscoe convinces Millie to do a screen test, but she doesn't have the money for it. Howard has a home movie of Millie that Roscoe thinks he can use. Roscoe sends the film to producer Frank Springer in Hollywood. Frank sends Roscoe a telegram saying he wants to set up an interview with Millie for a part in a picture. Millie's scared but goes to see Mr. Carr (Dick Wilson), the casting director. Millie's reading for the part of a southern girl doesn't go well. Sam, Millie and Roscoe are at a restaurant. Roscoe is depressed and Millie is relieved. Roscoe gets excited when the beautiful Cashier (Teri Garr) has a southern accent. Sam hears from Roscoe that the Cashier got the part. Timothy Blake as Blonde.
13	13	"Sam and the Teenager"	Christian Nyby	Dick Bensfield & Perry Grant	December 30, 1968
Sam tells Goober and Emmett that the high school journalism class has been assigned to interview the office holders in Mayberry. Sam is going to his office for his interview. Sam meets Nancy Hughes (Darleen Carr), who is instantly attracted to him. She gushes over everything that he says. The next day, Nancy finds Sam at the bakery and asks to interview him some more. Millie tells Sam that Nancy has a huge crush on him. Sam now tries to avoid Nancy. Goober and Emmett tease Sam about Nancy. Sam wants to tell her off but Millie and Howard think that will effect her psychologically. Howard suggests finding a younger version of Sam for her to fall for. Sam asks Emmett's nephew Pete to join him, Millie, Nancy, Howard, and Emmett at a barbecue at Myers Lake. Nancy has no interest in Pete. Howard has a direct talk with Nancy about Sam. The next day, Nancy goes to the bakery and apologizes to Sam for throwing herself at him. Nancy is now attracted to Howard. Howard tells Sam and Emmett that he told Nancy right off that he wasn't interested. It appears she is now hooking up with Pete.
14	14	"New Couple in Town"	Hal Cooper	Dan Beaumont	January 6, 1969
It is learned that a new couple is moving into town, but only renting the home for 3 months. Goober is at his gas station reading a "Monsters from Mars" comic book. A car with New York plates pulls in. Goober meets Frank Wylie (Richard Erdman), who rented the house. Frank says he's a writer and he's hoping a change of scenery will inspire his creativity. That night, Aunt Bee is hosting the literary club meeting. Sam comes by and tells them about Frank being a writer. The club hopes to get Frank to speak at their next meeting. The next day, Howard and Aunt Bee speak with Mrs. Audrey Wylie (Emmaline Henry). Audrey accepts the invitation to speak on Frank's behalf. What the town doesn't know is that Frank writes monster comic books. Goober asks to join the literary club, but is turned down because all he's ever read is comic books. Sam feels bad about it and asks Aunt Bee to invite Goober to the next meeting. Meanwhile, Frank is having a hard time coming up with something new. Frank goes to the gas station again and Goober inadvertently gives Frank a fresh idea. It is the night of the meeting and club members are worried about Goober being there. Frank starts his speech and mentions getting inspiration from a new collaborator. The members a stunned when Frank says he's been working with Goober.
15	15	"Aunt Bee's Cruise: Part 1"	Christian Nyby	Dick Bensfield & Perry Grant	January 13, 1969
Aunt Bee is about to deposit some money in her savings account. But after Mike suggests doing something fun with the money, Aunt Bee considers the Caribbean cruise she's always wanted to take. Sam encourages her to do it. Goober, Emmett and Howard tease Aunt Bee about shipboard romances. Aunt Bee invites them to a bon voyage party on the boat. Millie gives Aunt Bee a lesson in attracting a man. On the boat, Aunt Bee's friends point out some of the men on board. After the party, and her friends have left, Aunt Bee mistakes Captain Charles Wolford (Will Geer) for a steward. They brush off the mistake and she is slightly attracted to him. Aunt Bee befriends two other older ladies, Blanche Wilkins and Amelia Turner. Aunt Bee runs into Charles and advises him on the proper care for his African violets. She accepts his invitation for coffee in the officers lounge. They wind up spending a lot of time together on the trip. Aunt Bee writes back home about Charles. Charles tells Aunt Bee that he is going to retire after this trip and hopes to settle down on a farm somewhere. Her two week trip is over and Aunt Bee returns home. She tells her friends that Charles proposed and she accepted. Aunt Bee receives a telegram from Charles saying he'll be arriving in Mayberry in a week. Emory Parnell as Older Man.
16	16	"Aunt Bee's Cruise: Part 2"	Christian Nyby	Perry Grant & Dick Bensfield	January 20, 1969
Aunt Bee's friend Ella (Renie Riano) comes by and wants to hear all about Charles. Aunt Bee is planning an engagement reception. Meanwhile, Howard, Goober and Emmett are concerned that Aunt Bee may have rushed into the engagement. They don't trust Charles and will keep an eye on him at the party. It is the night of the reception and the towns people get to meet Charles. He claims he'll take good care of Aunt Bee. The next day Charles and Aunt Bee look at a farm and set the date for the wedding. Aunt Bee sees a TV show about a sea captain talking to his girlfriend. The captain says that the sea will always be a part of him. Aunt Bee starts to wonder whether Charles will some day want to return to the sea. Little things that Charles does makes Aunt Bee even more concerned. At the wedding rehearsal, Aunt Bee says she wants to postpone the wedding. Aunt Bee tells Charles about her concerns and he tries to reassure her. After going back to the boat to pick up some things and then talking to Mike about the sea, Charles realizes the sea will always be his first love. He speaks to Aunt Bee and she understands.
17	17	"Driver Education"	Christian Nyby	John McGreevey	January 27, 1969
Sam and Howard meet with principal Mr. Adams (Willis Bouchey) and Mrs. Corcoran (Helen Page Camp), the head of the parent's association. Mrs. Corcoran is concerned with the rise of minor traffic accidents and violations occurring among the teenagers in Mayberry. She recommends a drivers education course be instituted at the high school. They also need to find a capable person to teach the course. Sam recommends Goober. Goober meets with Mr. Adams and accepts the job. Things go well with Goober teaching the class. Then one day while backing out of a tight spot in the parking lot, Goober backs into Mr. Adams' beloved car, badly damaging it. Goober admits to Mr. Adams what happened and Mr. Adams can't believe his driving instructor caused the damage. Emmett tells Goober he should quit before he gets fired. Goober lets Howard and Sam know he's quitting. Sam says he'll talk to Mr. Adams first. Mr. Adams tells Sam he's willing to overlook the accident. But, Mrs. Corcoran and some of the other parents want to hold a meeting about the incident. At the meeting, Mrs. Corcoran insists that Goober be replaced. Goober tells his class that he won't be teaching them anymore. His students are sorry to see him go. Goober is called to the meeting. The parents tell him how pleased they are with the progress he's made with their children. Mrs. Corcoran says that after hearing what the parents had to say, she looks forward to her daughter being taught by him next year. Elizabeth Harrower as Mrs. Meredith. William Henry as Mr. Wilkerson. Brenda Sykes as Dorothy June.
18	18	"Howard's Hobby"	Hal Cooper	Perry Grant & Dick Bensfield	February 3, 1969
Howard's been dating a woman named Grace and they are really getting along. But Howard tells Sam that there seems to be something missing. Grace tells Millie the same thing. The next day, Howard decides there should be common interests between him and Grace. He tells Sam that during their date that night, he will ask her about her hobbies. When asked, Grace tells Howard her hobby is skydiving. Howard talks to Sam, and while very apprehensive, he feels he has to take up skydiving. At the Mt. Pilot Airport, Howard gets a lesson in skydiving from Chuck (Larry Pennell). Grace is thrilled that Howard is taking the lessons. Sam can tell that Howard is nervous about his first jump and tells him he doesn't have to go through with it. It is the day of the jump and Goober and Emmett are not helping to ease Howard's nerves. Howard makes the jump and all his friends congratulate him. The next day, Howard tells Sam that he should be in good with Grace now. Grace then pulls up on a motorcycle she just bought. She tells Howard that he'll love riding and should get one of his own. Howard tells Sam that he might have to find another girlfriend.
19	19	"The Camper"	Hal Cooper	Dick Bensfield & Perry Grant	February 10, 1969
Sam, Howard, Emmett and Goober are making plans for their camping trip. Meanwhile, Mike and his friend Harold have a major argument. It has been several days and the boys are still not speaking. Howard suggests that they take the boys on the trip so they can see the meaning of friendship. The boys agree to go, as long as they don't have to speak to each other. They arrive at the camp site and the men immediately try to show what doing things together as friends is like. It is not long before the men start bickering with each other. That night, it starts to storm and everyone is confined to the camper. The men continue to snap at one another, while Sam tries to keep the peace. The boys are watching all this and ask Sam why they are fighting. Sam tries to down play what's going on and sends the boys off to bed. The boys are starting have fun watching the men annoy each other and they become friends again. Sam has had enough and wants to drive home, but the camper is stuck in the mud. The next day, they return home with the boys friends and the men not speaking to each other. Something Aunt Bee says makes the men start talking again.
20	20	"Sam the Expert Farmer"	Christian Nyby	Elroy Schwartz	February 17, 1969
Sam was experimenting growing string beans, but his crop turned out very poorly. Sam consults with his friend Ralph Barton, but Ralph has no answers. He then talks to Harry at the lawn and garden shop in town, but he's no help. Meanwhile, Millie is growing string beans in her backyard garden from Sam's seeds and they turned out big and beautiful. Goober drops off her car and sees the beans. Sam later sees Millie's beans and asks her what she did to get them to grow so well. Turns out Millie did nothing special but water them. Sam gets irritated when Millie sees a bucket of his tiny shriveled up beans. That night Sam and Millie are double dating with Goober and Marilyn. Sam becomes annoyed when Goober keeps complimenting Millie's beans. Afterwards, Millie tries to console Sam, but they wind up in an argument. Mike talks to Millie about her fight with Sam and her beans. Later, Mike tells Sam that Millie talks to her beans. Ralph sees Sam talking to his beans and tells Sam something that makes him feel better. Sam apologizes to Millie and brings her some of his tomato crop. After he leaves, she compares his tomatoes to hers and hers are bigger.
21	21	"The Pet Shop"	Hal Cooper	S : Bob Ross; T : Paul West	February 24, 1969
Harvey Smithers (Glen Ash) is opening a new pet shop in Mayberry. Harvey is moving his business from the smaller town of Blue Hill. Mike asks Sam if he can have a dog, but Sam says he's not responsible enough. Mike visits the pet shop and befriends a mutt there. He asks Harvey if he could have a job there after school and on weekends. Harvey wants Mike to get Sam's permission. Mike talks to Aunt Bee and the two of them convince Sam to let Mike have the job. While at work, Mike tries to talk people into buying the mutt. Aunt Bee, Mike and Millie finally get Sam to agree to Mike having a dog. Mike brings the mutt home and names him Fritz. But, they soon learn that he is allergic to the dog. At the pet shop, Aunt Bee embellishes the dog's background and talks Howard into taking Fritz.
22	22	"An Efficient Service Station"	Hal Cooper	S : Joel Swanson; T : John McGreevey	March 3, 1969
Ken Marshall (Woodrow Parfrey), a district sales manager with the ACME Refining Company, is looking for Goober. Ken doesn't like the way Goober runs his station. Profits haven't increased and Goober's appearance doesn't fit with ACME's image. Ken wants Goober to read a book he gives him entitled "The Hard Sale Made Easy". If things don't improve, ACME will take away Goober's franchise. Later, Emmett comes by the station and makes fun of Goober's white uniform and cap. Emmett is just there for a visit and gets annoyed when Goober starts checking things on his car. Goober tells Sam that he's not enjoying his work anymore with all the new rules. Goober says he might just quit. Howard tells Sam and Emmett that Goober shut down the station. Howard is worried that without a gas station the town will slowly fall apart. Goober takes a job as a door to door shoe salesman. Goober later tells Sam he might take on some other jobs. Sam can sense that Goober isn't doing well with this new job. While getting air at the gas station, Sam runs into G.B. Smith (Don Beddoe). Smith asks Sam why the station shut down and Sam tells him what happened. Turns out Smith is the president of ACME and he wants Goober to run the station the way he used to. Buddy Lester as Phil Atkerson. Elizabeth Harrower as Mrs. Brandt.
23	23	"Emmett's Retirement"	Hal Cooper	Dick Bensfield & Perry Grant	March 10, 1969
Emmett has Sam, Howard and Goober at his shop and has them watch him burn his paid mortgage contract. Emmett also tells them that he is retiring. Martha is surprised when Emmett tells her the news. He also says that they'll take a trip to Washington, D.C. But they no sooner get to D.C. when Emmett says it is time to go home. Back in Mayberry, Emmett tries to fill his time with fishing and other activities. Martha runs into Sam and tells him that Emmett can't seem to find enough things to do. Sam says it might just take time to adjust. Goober loses his patience with Emmett when Emmett hangs around the gas station and tells Goober how to do things. Sam, Howard and Goober find a way to get Emmett back in the fix-it business and still save face. Luana Anders as Cashier. Alberta Nelson as Flora the Waitress. Danny Bonaduce as Boy.
24	24	"Millie's Girlfriend"	Hal Cooper	Perry Grant & Dick Bensfield	March 17, 1969
Millie is talking on the phone with her friend Renee Miller (Marianna Hill), a fashion model, who lives in New York. Renee's boyfriend has just broken up with her and Millie invites her to Mayberry for a few days. Millie has to work, so she asks Sam to show Renee around town so she won't be lonely. When Sam and Renee get back to Millie's house, Millie is coming down with a cold. Millie now asks Sam to take Renee to the movies that evening. Millie is a little surprised at how excited Renee is about going out with Sam. Aunt Bee visits with Millie. Sam and Renee return late and are laughing. Renee asks Sam to stay a while and they talk into the evening. Millie starts to get a little jealous and comes downstairs. After Sam leaves, Renee asks Millie if her and Sam are engaged, to which Millie says no. The next day, Renee comes out to Sam's farm. Later, Renee tells Millie how nice country life is. Millie tells Aunt Bee that she regrets asking Renee to come for the visit and she can tell Renee likes Sam. Aunt Bee has a plan and tells Millie to invite Renee over to Sam's for dinner. Aunt Bee exaggerates how hard farm life is to Renee. Renee tells everyone that she's going back to New York.
25	25	"The Church Bell"	Christian Nyby	S : Joel Swanson; T : Paul West	March 24, 1969
Sam returns from Siler City and tells Howard that Rev. Bickford's (Willis Bouchey) church has a bell for sale. Mayberry's church doesn't have a bell. Howard is the church treasurer and wants to call a committee meeting to get their opinion. Millie, who is co-treasurer, says the church can only afford $150. Reverend reminds the committee that Rev. Bickford is hard to bargain with. He suggests they play it cool and not seem too interested in the bell. Meanwhile, Rev. Bickford would love to sell the bell, but tells his committee they should not seem too anxious. When the two parties get together, Rev. Bickford asks $200 for the bell. Sam offers $150 which Rev. Bickford quickly rejects. After leaving, both parties feel the other will give in. Rev. Bickford finally accepts the $150 offer. Sam has bad news for the committee. It seems that Lucius Fremont (Howard Wendell) owned the land under the church. He donated the land to the church provided that a bell never be hung there in his lifetime. After Howard fails to see Lucius, Sam and Millie go. At first Lucius refuses to give an explanation. But then he tells Sam his reason for not wanting the bell. It seems many years ago he was stood up by his bride on their wedding day at that church. The bell ringing would remind him of that day. Lucius finds a way for the church to keep its bell. Maudie Prickett as Lydia. Barbara Pepper as Emma. Jess Kirkpatrick as Fred Summers. Renie Riano as Ella.
26	26	"Sister Cities"	Hal Cooper	Albert E. Lewin	May 12, 1969
Mayberry gets an invitation to join a sister city program by the United States government. The city council approves of the idea and is then to arrange for a delegation from their Mexican sister city, Puerto Bello, to visit Mayberry. After receiving the invitation, the town council of Puerto Bello agrees to send some members to Mayberry. Mayor Juan Nunez and Pablo Santos (Pedro Gonzalez Gonzalez) arrive in town. Juan presents the town with a very expensive looking goblet. Aunt Bee was going to give the men a needle point welcome sign, but now feels they should get something better. She tells them the gift has been delayed and then shows them to the hotel. At a council meeting, Sam thinks they should just have given the sign because it is the thought that counts. The others want to find a much more extravagant gift. Sam has the men over for what he thought would be a simple lunch. But Aunt Bee has a fancy meal served with Goober as the butler. While the men are outside, Sam tells Aunt Bee that she shouldn't be putting on airs the way she is. Aunt Bee says they must come from a very rich town and they should be treated that way. Sam overhears the men talking about how impressed they are with Mayberry. Sam also hears that they spent half the town treasury to buy the goblet. He tells Aunt Bee what he heard. That night at the ball, Aunt Bee finds a gracious way to return the goblet and she presents her sign to Mayor Nunez. Norman Leavitt as Mr. Felton James Victor as Sanchez.

=== Season 2 (1969–70) ===
No. overall	No. in season	Title	Directed by	Written by	Original release date
27	1	"Andy's Baby"	Hal Cooper	Roswell Rogers	September 22, 1969
Aunt Bee and Sam prepare for a visit from Andy and Helen and their new baby, Andy Jr. Andy is now with the State Bureau of Investigation in Charlotte. They want to christen their baby in Mayberry. After they arrive, Howard, Goober, and Emmett come by to see the baby. Goober, then Emmett and then Howard, each hint that they would like to be the godfather. After they find out that Sam is chosen, the men are upset because they all feel they are closer to Andy. Andy notices that the three men have become very cold and distant to him. They're also distant to Sam. Andy suggests having four godfathers and the men agree. But then the three fight over who will be the spokesman at church. It is the day of the christening and it still hasn't been decided who will be the spokesman. When the Reverend asks for the spokesman, all four men come up. Despite things being very unorthodox, the Reverend smooths things over. Later, Mike wonders why he doesn't have four godfathers and Sam has to rectify the situation. Andy Griffith and Aneta Corsaut guest star.
28	2	"Saving Morelli's"	Hal Cooper	S : Bob Ross; T : Paul West	September 29, 1969
Mr. Morelli (Frank Puglia) announces that he will be closing his restaurant due to the lack of customers. He says that everyone is going to Pagano's in Mt. Pilot because they feature a floor show. Howard and Millie offer to help by going to Raleigh to hire an act from Charley Pierce's (Buddy Lester) theatrical agency. They hire a local act known as the Claghorn Brothers. Word spreads and Mr. Morelli is expecting a large crowd. But then the Claghorn Brothers cancel due to a family emergency. Because it is the last minute, Howard can't find another act. Sam used to entertain when he was in the Army and Howard and Millie hope he will help. Sam says that it has been too long since he did that type of entertaining and turns them down. Everyone is now upset with Sam. Sam changes his mind and that night he performs as a song and dance scarecrow.
29	3	"Howard the Poet"	Hal Cooper	Roswell Rogers	October 6, 1969
"The Carolina Pen and Quill", the state literary magazine, sends a letter to Howard. The magazine is initiating a new poetry section for native North Carolina poets. They would like to commission him to write an original poem for the page. Howard regards it as a "team victory" with the Mayberry literary club. Some time passes and everyone is wondering how Howard's poem is coming along. The reality of it is that Howard is suffering from writer's block. Sam comes by Howard's office and reminds him of the deadline for the poem. Now his writer's block gets even worse. After hearing that he isn't eating, Aunt Bee brings Howard some food. But her being around is distracting Howard. Howard's friends start to realize the pressure he is under. Howard goes out to the woods to get some inspiration. Goober comes by and tries to give Howard a pep talk, but Howard just wants him to leave. Later, Howard believes he's a failure and tells this to Sam. Howard winds up writing a poem about failure and it gets published.
30	4	"Goober and the Telephone Girl"	Hal Cooper	Perry Grant & Dick Bensfield	October 13, 1969
Goober is upset over his bill from the Mt. Pilot telephone company for calls he didn't make. Sam drives Goober to Mt. Pilot and Goober speaks with Violet Henderson (Luana Anders) from the company. Violet calms Goober down and the two get along very well. They go to a local diner for her coffee break. Violet tells Goober she can't see him Friday night as she has a Judo class. They make a date to go to Morelli's on Saturday. Emmett and Howard tease Goober about Violet taking Judo. It is Saturday and Sam and Millie double date with Goober and Violet. A man (David Ketchum) makes a pass at Violet and Goober goes to intercede. The man punches Goober in the stomach and Violet uses her judo skills to throw the man to the floor. An embarrassed Goober asks Sam to take Violet home and leaves. Word gets around and Goober thinks the whole town is laughing at him. Violet comes by to talk to Sam and Millie shows up saying Goober is selling his gas station. Sam talks to Goober and says to show people he's not afraid, he should take Violet to Morelli's again. At Morelli's, Goober starts an argument at the jukebox with a man named Jim (Ron Masak). Gwen (Nora Denney), who is Violet's Judo instructor, says hello to Sam, Millie and Violet. Gwen sees Goober shove Jim, who happens to be her husband, and Gwen throws Goober to the floor. Goober decides to take Judo lessons. Danny Bonaduce as Danny.
31	5	"Millie the Model"	Hal Cooper	Burt Styler	October 20, 1969
Millie visits a dress shop in Mt. Pilot that is run by her friend Emma Whittaker (Eve McVeagh). Millie tries on a new line of dresses and is introduced to their designer, Miss Rogers (June Vincent). Miss Rogers likes Millie's freshness and asks her to come to New York for a month to model the line for fashion magazines. Millie is excited and accepts the offer. It has been a week and Mr. Felton (Norman Leavitt), the mailman, finally brings a card from Millie. She's been busy and has met a sculptor. Another week passes with no word from Millie. Sam runs into Goober and his girlfriend Hilda. Hilda was in New York once and tells Sam how exciting it was. Sam starts to worry about Millie and makes up an excuse to go to New York. Sam goes to see Millie and Thornton Avery (Laurie Main), the photographer, is not happy that Sam interrupted the photo shoot. Sam doesn't really get to talk to Millie as she is busy. Then the two go to a party that night. Sam finally gets a quiet moment with Millie. She says that while she's had fun, she can't wait to get back home. Millie gets upset when two showgirls start flirting with Sam and he seems to enjoy it. Millie drags him out of the party. Sam and Millie get back to Mayberry and she's still upset with Sam. George N. Neise as Austin Harlowe. Quinn Redeker as Barry. Forrest Compton as Biddleton. Farrah Fawcett as Show Girl #1.
32	6	"Mike's Birthday Party"	Hal Cooper	Perry Grant & Dick Bensfield	October 27, 1969
Aunt Ella (Renie Riano) is filling in for Aunt Bee while she is taking care of her sick sister. Mike is planning on having a birthday party with no girls invited. Sally, a new girl in town, is having a birthday party on the same day as Mike and she is inviting the boys. Many of the boys tell Sally they can't make it to her party as they are going to Mike's. As a way to entice the boys to come to her party, Sally mentions all the sports related prizes she will have. Harold finds out that Mike's prizes are nowhere near as nice. Boys start to cancel out on Mike. Mike suggests to Sam that they get better prizes, but Sam says that would just be buying friendship. Mike decides to call off his party. Goober and Howard think Mike should have entertainment at his party. Goober could do magic tricks and Howard will show travel movies. But the boys are not impressed. Sally tells Mike that she is cancelling her party because her father says that giving away those expensive prizes is just buying friendship. Mike suggests that they combine their parties. Danny Bonaduce as Rick.
33	7	"The Farmer Exchange Project"	Christian Nyby	T : Paul West; S/T : Dennis Whitcomb	November 3, 1969
Aunt Bee is still at her sister's. Sam tells housekeeper Flora that he was chosen to be part of a Farmer Exchange Project with Russia. Professor Luboff is to spend two weeks with Sam. Everyone is surprised when Professor Luboff turns out to be Professor Tanya Luboff, a woman. Tanya is very proper and reserved and tells Sam and Millie that she was the only woman picked for the exchange project. Millie thinks she might have a good time at the dance on Saturday and asks Sam to get a date for Tanya. Sam talks a reluctant Howard into taking her to the dance. That night when Howard asks Tanya to be his date, she politely turns him down. She later overhears Flora telling Sam and Howard that Tanya hasn't discovered that it is fun to be a woman. Millie talks Tanya into going to the dance and helps her get ready clothes and hair wise. She also gives Tanya advice on how to act. It is the night of the dance and Sam and Millie arrive with a beautiful looking Tanya. Tanya dances with several men and has a great time.
34	8	"The Caper"	Christian Nyby	Roswell Rogers	November 10, 1969
Howard tells a Greensboro man (Herb Vigran), who is considering a move to Mayberry, that the town has been without a sheriff since Andy moved away. Howard says that they have Goober as a deputy sheriff. The man met Goober when he bought some gas and was not impressed with him. The man then walks out. Howard complains to Sam about the lack of new residents and wants to hold a special city council meeting concerning Goober. The council says that Goober is going to sheriff's academy two nights a month and worked under Andy. Bank President Cyrus Tankersley (George Cisar) says he trusts Goober. The men vote down Howard's motion to hire a sheriff. Emmett inadvertently tells Goober about the meeting and Goober is now upset. Howard comes up with a plan to stage a bank robbery. He wears a stocking to disguise his face and uses a water gun to hold up the teller, Hilda, and leaves with a bag of money. Howard gets into his car but it won't start. As Goober comes over to talk to Howard, Hilda comes out and points out Howard as the robber. Goober arrests Howard and many of the townsfolk see Goober take Howard to jail. From his jail cell, Howard tries to explain himself to Goober and the two start to argue. Sam holds another council meeting at the court house. At the meeting, Sam uses some psychology to get Goober and Howard to be friends again. Charles Lampkin as Ralph Barton.
35	9	"The New Farmhand"	Christian Nyby	Bob Mosher	November 17, 1969
Sam hires a new farmhand, Rudy Harwell (Glen Ash), to help harvest his corn crops. Rudy arrives in a 1969 AMC Javelin and Mike is impressed with the car. Sam introduces Rudy to Flora, who is still filling in for Aunt Bee. Mike starts spending a lot of time with Rudy and listens to stories of his past adventures. Emmett mentions to Sam how impressed Mike is with Rudy. Even Flora sees how much Mike admires Rudy. Flora tells Sam he should spend more time with Mike. She is afraid Mike is beginning to enjoy being around Rudy more than him. The next day, Sam takes Mike into town, but Mike doesn't seem to have much fun. Flora tries to tell Rudy how close Sam and Mike are. Back at home, Sam and Mike try to put a model car together. Things don't go smoothly and then Rudy comes in and finishes the model. Mike goes off with Rudy. Later, Mike is having a hard time with a composition for school. Flora tells him to ask Sam for help, but he goes to Rudy instead. Rudy intentionally gives Mike bad advice hoping he will then turn to Sam. Mike does go to Sam and tells him about the bad advice Rudy gave him. The corn crop is harvested and Rudy leaves. It is then that Sam figures out that Rudy wanted Mike to be close to his father.
36	10	"Palm Springs, Here We Come"	Christian Nyby	Perry Grant & Dick Bensfield	November 24, 1969
Aunt Bee's friend Selma Plunkett (Ruth McDevitt) is coming for a visit. She married a wealthy ball bearing manufacturer and they have homes all around the world. Selma invites Aunt Bee, Sam, and Mike to stay at their Palm Springs home for a couple weeks while they're in Europe. At first they decline the offer, but Selma talks them into it. Goober, Howard, Emmett and Millie come by to say hello to Selma. Selma says it is a five bedroom house, so they all should go. Everyone makes arrangements to go and Sam just has to go to school to get Mike out of class. Mike informs Sam that he's flunking arithmetic because of his problem with fractions. Mike's teacher tells Sam that there will be another test in one week and if Mike can get a better grade, she wouldn't mind if he went on the trip. Everyone tries working with Mike, but things don't go that well. It is the day of the test and Mike isn't very confident. Everyone is thrilled when they learn Mike did well on the test. They plan to leave the next morning. Howard is embarrassed when Goober shows up at the bus stop in a very loud tourist outfit. And his embarrassment continues on the plane.
37	11	"Palm Springs, Here We Are"	Christian Nyby	Dick Bensfield & Perry Grant	December 15, 1969
On the plane, Howard is trying to impress a stewardess, but Goober butts in and ruins things. The group arrive in Palm Springs and then head to Selma's house. The home is large and beautiful. Howard and Goober wind up having to share a room. Millie comes back from town saying she saw Rock Hudson. By the pool, Howard gets upset when Goober gets him wet. Their bickering continues that night while they're in their bedroom trying to sleep. The next morning Goober and Howard are still getting on each other's nerves. The others notice this and hope it won't ruin the vacation. Sam rents a Dune buggy and he, Millie, Howard and Goober go riding in the desert. Goober and Howard are still not getting along. They run out of gas and fortunately another driver comes by. Sam and Millie go with the driver to get gas after Goober and Howard insist on staying behind. The two start to worry when it seems that Sam has been gone longer than it should've taken. The men start to confess things to each other and become friends again. Sam and Millie finally show up and are surprised to see the men getting along.
38	12	"Millie and the Palm Springs Golf Pro"	Christian Nyby	Perry Grant & Dick Bensfield	December 22, 1969
The gang are still vacationing in Palm Springs. Sam runs into an old war buddy named Charlie Harris (Charles Bateman). Charlie is a golf pro at one of the local clubs. He invites Sam and Millie over to the driving range for some lessons. After some time on the range, Sam remembers that they have to pick up Goober and Mike from the movies. Millie would like to stay, so Charlie offers to drive her back. Later, when Charlie brings Millie home, he tells her she's beautiful and kisses her. Goobers at the door and happens to see this, but he doesn't see her slap Charlie. Millie tells Goober not to say anything to Sam. Millie finally tells Sam what happened and he just laughs it off saying that's the same old Charlie. This makes Millie furious and she feels she's being taken for granted. Wanting to show Sam, Millie goes to ask Charlie for a date. He says that she's "Sam's girl" and he's apologizes for what he did. Millie decides to make it look to Sam as though she's going out on a date. She spends the night at a malt shop. It is getting late and Sam goes out looking for Millie. Sam and Millie run into each other in town and she confesses that she wasn't on a date. Millie is thrilled when Sam confesses that he was jealous.
39	13	"Palm Springs Cowboy"	Christian Nyby	Dick Bensfield & Perry Grant	December 29, 1969
The gang are still in Palm Springs. Millie and Aunt Bee are in Los Angeles. Howard meets Walter Michaels (Arthur Space), a neighbor and realizes he's a big Hollywood producer. Howard, Emmett, Goober, Sam and Mike then head off to a cowboy breakfast horse ride. A cowboy then sings a song for entertainment and Emmett recognizes him as former singing cowboy movie actor King Beaumont (Dick Foran). Howard introduces himself to King and mentions he met Walter Michaels. Back at home, Howard writes an article for the Mayberry Gazette. King comes by with a movie script he wrote for a Western that he would like Howard to give to Walter. Howard reads the script to the others and decides to set up a meeting with King and Walter. Sam thinks Howard might be getting in over his head. The next day, Howard talks to Walter and he reluctantly agrees to have a meeting later that day. That afternoon, King comes by with his partners Jennie Mae Swanson (Jeanne Bates) and Shorty Williams and they meet Walter. The three perform a scene from the film. Walter doesn't seem impressed and he says the time might not be right for a film like that. Walter leaves and King thanks the guys for trying. King then sings Red River Valley. Later, the guys talk about how they'll be heading home the next day.
40	14	"Goober's Niece"	Hal Cooper	Perry Grant & Dick Bensfield	January 12, 1970
Goober is at the bus stop waiting for his niece Beverly to arrive. He tells Sam and Millie that Beverly is 15 and will be staying with him for two weeks while her parents are on a trip. Beverly arrives and Goober treats her like a little girl. Beverly is at Goober's gas station when she meets Tommy and they both seem to like each other. Tommy talks to Millie about Beverly. He would like to ask her to the Siler City high school dance but he's never asked a girl for a date. Millie visits Beverly and tells her that Tommy is going to call her for a date. Beverly is excited. Tommy calls and Goober answers the phone. When Goober finds out what Tommy wants, he rudely tells him Beverly can't go out with him and hangs up. Millie and Beverly overhear the conversation and Beverly gets upset. Millie and Sam talk Goober into letting Beverly go with Tommy. It is the night of the dance and Goober gives Tommy a specific time to have Beverly home. On the way back from the dance, Tommy runs out of gas. Tommy calls but Goober doesn't believe that's what happened. When the kids get home, Goober loses his cool and chases Tommy away. Beverly stops talking to Goober. Goober finds a way to make things right. William Benedict as Uncle Whitmore.
41	15	"Emmett Takes a Fall"	Hal Cooper	Bob Mosher	January 19, 1970
While tossing a football with Sam at Goober's service station, Emmett falls into the grease pit. The guys take Emmett to the Doctor and learn he broke his arm. He'll have to wear a cast for 5-6 weeks. Emmett is worried about having to close his shop. Not wanting to leave the town without a fix-it shop, Emmett puts an add in the paper for help. A scientifically-minded high school boy named Ernie applies for the job. Emmett at first turns him down, but then hires him. Emmett soon learns that Ernie is very skilled at fixing things. Word spreads around town about how talented Ernie is and now everyone is bringing in things to be fixed by him. A depressed Emmett tells Sam that he's closing up shop and leaving Mayberry. He says his shop just isn't the same anymore. Sam tells Emmett that even he has to try and keep up with new things and methods. After Emmett leaves, Sam calls the high school. Emmett winds up joining Mr. Desmond's (Jason Wingreen) science class at the school. Vince Barnett as Elmo.
42	16	"The New Well"	Christian Nyby	S : Joel Swanson; T : Perry Grant & Dick Bensfield	January 26, 1970
The well on Sam's farm is starting to run dry. Sam decides to leave for Raleigh to find a drilling company. J.P. Judson (Douglas Fowley), a haggard old man, arrives at the farm. He tells Aunt Bea that he's a Dowser and can find water with a divining rod. She offers him a room in the barn until Sam comes home the next day. Sam comes home and tells Aunt Bea that he hired a company and their geologist will be there in the morning. Aunt Bea introduces Sam to Judson and Sam tells him that he's already hired someone else. She talks Sam into letting Judson stay to watch the geologist. Mr. Harris arrives and finds a spot where he'd like to start drilling. Judson checks the spot out and says they won't get any water there. Harris drills anyway, but comes up dry. Later, Judson claims to have found a spot and only wants $50 to show Sam where it is at. Sam says he's going to stick with Mr. Harris. That night Sam doesn't sleep well. The next day Sam tries using a diving rod and Aunt Bea sees him. But he's still going with Mr. Harris. Harris drills another hole and comes up dry again. Harris bets Judson that he can't find water and Judson tells Harris to keep drilling where they are. Harris drills another 20 feet and they hit water.
43	17	"Emmett and the Ring"	Hal Cooper	John McGreevey	February 2, 1970
Emmett and Martha's wedding anniversary is coming up. He wants to take her engagement ring to Mt. Pilot to be cleaned. Emmett mentions to Sam, Howard and Goober that a he ran into Wendell, a stockbroker friend of his. Wendell gave Emmett a "sure thing" insider tip on a planned merger between two companies. In Mt. Pilot, Mr. Peterson (Arthur Peterson), the Jeweler, tells Emmett that the ring is now worth $1,500. Emmett notices a $35 synthetic diamond that looks identical to Martha's. Later, Emmett tells Sam and Howard how he pawned Martha's diamond for $1100 and had Wendell buy stock in the company that's going to merge. Emmett gives Martha the fake diamond ring. Emmett learns that the merger didn't go through. He tries to tell Martha what he did, but can't bring himself to do it. And he finds out he'll only get $400 for his stock. Martha takes the ring to Mr. Finletter (Byron Morrow) to have it appraised for insurance purposes. Sam, Goober, and Howard bring Emmett and Martha an electric blanket as a gift. Mr. Finletter calls and tells Martha that the ring is worth $35. Emmett finally tells Martha what he did. She is very upset and says she's going to her mother's. The two argue some more but then make up.
44	18	"Goober's Brother"	Hal Cooper	John McGreevey	February 9, 1970
Goober receives a letter from his older brother Braden (Woodrow Parfrey) that he is returning to his hometown for a visit. Braden joined the Navy nearly 20 years ago and stayed in California. Goober believes he works in a factory and probably had to save up for this trip. He hopes Braden will be impressed with the fact that he owns his own gas station. In reality, Braden is a successful and important engineer in the government's space program. Goober arranges a dinner party for when Braden arrives. When Braden sees Goobers room, he decides to not tell Goober about his job. At dinner Braden receives a call from his job and the men discover he's an engineer. The waitress says that he also has calls from Washington D.C. and NASA. Sam then remembers reading about Braden and the space program. This makes Goober feel inferior, and something Emmett says makes Goober feel even worse. The next day, Millie runs into Goober at the library where he's looking at engineering books. Goober tries to impress his friends with some engineering terms. Braden tells Goober he has to cut his visit short. Something Sam tells Goober makes Goober feel better about himself. Albert Popwell as Hayes.
45	19	"The Mayberry Road"	Hal Cooper	Bob Mosher	February 16, 1970
Aunt Bee, Sam and Mike stop at a spot in Grover's woods that she is quite fond of. Sam tells her that the county is putting a road through there to make a shortcut from the highway to Mayberry. Aunt Bee and the garden club decide to send Sam to the County Seat to protest. Sam at first turns her down as he believes the road will be a good thing. But he reluctantly agrees to go to Mt. Pilot. Sam, Clara and Aunt Bee go to see Commissioner Osborne (Ned Wertimer). Osborne tells them the road has to be built. The day that construction is to start, the ladies arrive to protest and block the tractors from going through. Osborne tells the ladies the project will be temporarily postponed while he looks into the matter. Osborne comes up with a plan to put the road in without cutting down a tree. Howard figures out that will make the shortcut a half mile longer than the current road. Hal Baylor as Foreman. Maudie Prickett as Myrtle.
46	20	"Millie and the Great Outdoors"	Christian Nyby	Perry Grant & Dick Bensfield	March 2, 1970
Sam is overworked and when he hears that Emmett and Martha are going away on a relaxing trip, he wishes he could do the same. Sam and Howard decide that they will go camping. Meanwhile, Millie tells Aunt Bee that she would like to go stay at a fancy hotel in Charlotte with Sam. Sam comes home and tells Millie they're going camping with Howard and Barbara Evans. Sam doesn't know that Millie hates camping. Later, Millie tells Sam, Howard and Barbara that she's not going with. But after she hears how Barbara loves fishing, hiking and camping, Millie decides she better go. At the campsite, Howard falls and tears a ligament in his foot while gathering firewood. Millie begins to feel out of place seeing Barbara's outdoor know-how. And it doesn't help that Sam and Barbara get along so well. No matter how hard Millie tries, she's just can't compete with Barbara. The next morning, Sam and Barbara go off fishing before Millie wakes up. Millie gets upset and tells Howard she's taking Sam's truck and going home. Back at home, Millie tells Aunt Bee how she ruined the trip. Because she's a better "indoors" person, Aunt Bee thinks Millie should host a dinner party for Sam, Howard and Barbara and show off her talents. At the party, things are going very well for Millie, until she tries to open a bottle of wine and spills it all over herself. But that doesn't ruin the rest of the evening.
47	21	"The Sculptor"	Christian Nyby	Bob Mosher	March 9, 1970
Millie receives a letter from Rex Alexander (Robert Sampson), a famous sculptor she met while modeling in New York. He's coming to visit Mayberry to take in some of its "rural tranquility". Rex would like Millie to find him a place to rent for a month. After Rex arrives, Millie throws a tea party to have some of the towns people meet him. Rex has been in town for a week and has grown quite fond of the place. He tells Sam and Millie he would like to create a sculpture for the town as a gift. Rex has been working in secrecy and the town is growing excited. It is the morning of the unveiling and Aunt Bee has a few words to say to the crowd. Millie removes the tarp to reveal a very large abstract sculpture. The piece is called "The Struggle" and the crowd looks at it in awkward silence. After the crowd disperses, Rex is worried the people don't like it. Sam and Millie try to reassure him that everyone loves it. It is decided that Howard would subtly try to find out from Rex what the piece represents. Rex says that it represents man against machine. As much as they try, the towns people just don't get it. Sam thinks he has a solution. Another ceremony is held by the sculpture. Aunt Bee introduces Anthony Harper (Howard Wendell), a curator from the Raleigh Art Museum. The plan is that the sculpture will be permanently loaned to the museum so that many more people will be able to enjoy it.
48	22	"The Health Fund"	Christian Nyby	S : Joel Swanson; T : Bob Mosher	March 16, 1970
At their lodge finance meeting, Sam discusses their new health insurance plan. It will only increase dues $8 a month and all bills will be paid by the lodge. Later, Howard tells Sam that his doctor suggests he have an operation to correct his deviated septum. Elmo finds the timing of this operation very suspicious. Emmett and Goober confront Howard and call him a crook. They go with to the hospital to make sure Howard doesn't pad the bill. Emmett and Goober then ask Dr. Wilson (Frank Wilcox) about some of the expenses of the operation. The next day, Sam visits Howard in the hospital. Emmett and Goober decide to go see Howard at checkout time to make sure he doesn't stay longer than he should. Howard's roommate, Mr. Hazlett (John Harmon), tells him about his appendicitis symptoms. Howard now believes he has appendicitis and wants to stay. Emmett and Goober show up and want Howard out. Sam says he's staying until Dr. Wilson checks him out. Dr. Wilson thinks that Howard's symptoms are psychosomatic, but orders lab tests to be sure. The lodge meets and learns the health fund is heavily depleted. Goober suggests if Howard doesn't have appendicitis the lodge shouldn't pay for the extra day. Howard is out of the hospital. Goober doesn't believe someone can develop symptoms just by talking about it. Then Sam mentions hives and Goober starts itching. Jeanne Bates as Receptionist.
49	23	"The Mayberry Float"	Hal Cooper	Paul West	March 23, 1970
Sam shows Howard a letter from the Mt. Pilot Historical Society wanting to know if Mayberry will be entering a float in their big parade. Despite past failures, they decide the town will. At a meeting, they pick the theme for the float which will be Mayberry's early pioneer female settler. Howard and Millie come up with a design, but it will be hard to find a truck large enough to put the float on. Clara's nephew Jason has a big truck and Sam calls Clara about it. Clara agrees to ask Jason. Howard brings Herb Mooney (Herb Vigran) over to meet Sam, Emmett and Goober. Herb is in charge of the parade and is checking that all the floats will be done on time. He also mentions that most of the towns are featuring attractive girls on the floats. Howard, Emmett, and Goober ask Millie to be on the float and she agrees. Clara tells the men that Jason will lend his truck if Clara is the woman on the float. The men get upset when Sam agrees to let Clara be the one. Sam angrily steps down as head of the float project. Howard comes up with the idea to have both women on the float. Clara agrees to have another woman portray her pioneer daughter. It is the day of the parade. Clara is surprised when Millie shows up in a skimpy outfit and sits in the front of the float. Clara moves to a more prominent location, but winds up blocking Goober's view while he's driving. He crashes into a fire hydrant and destroys the float. Everyone gets mad at Sam, even though he wasn't in charge anymore.
50	24	"Aloha Goober"	Christian Nyby	Perry Grant & Dick Bensfield	March 30, 1970
Sam and Howard are driving down the road and see many signs promoting Goobers gas station. Goober tells them that the Acme Oil Co. is offering its dealers a prize of a vacation in Hawaii if their dealers double their sales in a month. Sam, Howard and Emmett tell Goober that it won't be that easy to double sales. Goober says he's a good enough businessman to do it. After some time, Goober calculates that he has only improved 120 percent. He decides to stay open 24 hours a day. Goober next calculates that he has improved sales 212 percent. Goober brags to the guys that he did it. Millie decides to throw Goober a Hawaiian themed going away party. Later, Charlie (Judson Pratt), an Acme deliveryman, comes by Goober's station. Goober mentions that he'll be going to Hawaii. Charlie tells him that the contest starts the following month. Goober checks the rules and realizes he made a mistake. Charlie says if he did it before, he can do it again, but Goober just isn't up for it. At the party and seeing how excited everyone is for him, Goober can't bring himself to tell them he messed up. Goober decides to go off for 10 days and pretend he is in Hawaii. Things get complicated when people ask about postcards and bringing them something back. When Goober pretends to call Sam from Hawaii, the charade starts to fall apart. Sam calls Acme Oil and finds out the contest just started. When Goober comes home, the men decide not to embarrass him and they don't say anything. Later, the men get confused when they see a picture of Goober in Hawaii, not knowing he staged it.
51	25	"Millie the Secretary"	Christian Nyby	Roswell Rogers	April 6, 1970
Millie has been going to Bradbury Business College to better her secretarial skills and hopefully get a job in that field. Sam drives her to the college for her exams. After the test, Millie believes she flunked, but she'll get the results in a few days. She later finds out that she passed. Millie goes to several interviews but finds getting a job is going to be harder than she thought. She finally gets a job with two men, Marty Parker (Herbie Faye) and Frank Wayne, who run a magazine subscription business. What she doesn't know is that the men are bookies and the business is a front for their illegal gambling. The men have Millie doing busy work and she wishes she could be of more help. Millie tells Sam, Howard and Emmett that she feels sorry for her bosses as she doesn't think they belong in the magazine business. She asks the guys to pick a magazine to subscribe to and Sam should come by the office the next day. The next day Sam comes by and Marty and Frank try to make excuses to not take his orders. Det. Carter (Richard X. Slattery) suddenly comes in the office. He takes Frank and Marty away and wants Sam and Millie to come along. Carter clears Sam and Millie, but wonders why neither suspected the men were bookies. Sam and Millie get into an argument over who should have figured it out. Back in town, Sam apologizes to Millie and both agree they weren't too smart. Ted Gehring as First Employer. Olan Soule as Second Employer. Milton Parsons as Third Employer. William Henry as Barton.
52	26	"The Mynah Bird"	Hal Cooper	Perry Grant & Dick Bensfield	April 13, 1970
Goober tells Sam that Howard is looking for someone to take care of his myna bird Macbeth. Howard is going to Raleigh for an ornithology symposium. Mike volunteers and Howard agrees. Howard brings the bird to Sam's house and gives Mike a set of instructions. Later, Mike's friend Harold comes by and takes Macbeth out of its cage. When Mike tells Harold to put it back, the bird flies out of an open window. The boys go looking for the bird with no luck. Harold suggests that they buy another bird and teach it to talk. The boys bring the bird back home. Aunt Bee finds out what happened to MacBeth and the boys beg her to not say anything just yet. At the convention, Howard is approached by a man (Bill Erwin) whose friend emcees a Mt. Pilot kids TV show. The man thinks Howard and MacBeth would be perfect for the show. The boys and even Aunt Bee work with the bird, but are getting nowhere. Meanwhile, MacBeth flies to Goober's gas station. Aunt Bee is about to tell Sam the truth when Mike wants to talk to her. Mike tells her Goober has MacBeth and the two go to get the bird. After they leave, Howard shows up and tells Sam he going on TV with the bird. Sam gives Howard the imposter bird. When Sam finds out Howard has the wrong bird, he, Mike and Aunt Bee race to Mt. Pilot. On the show the Ringmaster (Iggie Wolfington) introduces Howard and MacBeth. The bird won't talk and the kids are getting restless. Sam arrives at the show, MacBeth flies to Howard and starts talking, saving Howard from more embarrassment. William 'Billy' Benedict as Pet Shop Owner. Note: Final appearance of Frances Bavier as Aunt Bee.

=== Season 3 (1970–71) ===
No. overall	No. in season	Title	Directed by	Written by	Original release date
53	1	"Emmett's Domestic Problem"	Christian Nyby	Dick Bensfield & Perry Grant	September 14, 1970
Martha tells Emmett that a friend of hers has taken a job teaching despite her advanced age. Martha says that she needs something to do, express her creative talents, and wants to open a boutique shop. Emmett thinks it would be a waste of money as she has no business experience. But, he reluctantly agrees to let Martha open a shop. Martha opens her boutique and Emmett tells Howard he still believes it will be a failure. Emmett brags to Sam how he cleared $98 in one week. Martha comes by and tells the two that she cleared $243 in her first week. After Martha leaves, Emmett tries to down play her success to Sam. Goober comes and teases Emmett about how he'll be living on easy street from now on thanks to Martha. Martha gets a very favorable write up in the local newspaper. Martha is so busy at the store, that she asks Emmett to do the grocery shopping. Emmett gets upset when Martha suggests opening more shops and Emmett will help run them. Martha senses that she has bruised Emmett's ego and goes to talk to Sam. Martha finds a way to make Emmett feel important again.
54	2	"Sensitivity Training"	Christian Nyby	Perry Grant & Dick Bensfield	September 21, 1970
Sam, Millie, Howard and new girl Carol were on a date. Howard walks Carol to her door and she says there won't be a second date. She thinks he's too stuffy and could benefit from sensitivity training. Howard attends a class and learns to be more of a free spirit. He now dresses more casual and his friends are quite surprised with his new attitude about life. Howard suggests having a sensitivity class in Mayberry. Sam, Goober and Emmett want nothing to do with it, but Millie thinks it is a good idea. Howard keeps trying to talk the guys into it. Goober and Emmett have seconds thoughts and decide to go. Millie talks a reluctant Sam into going as well. The four go to Howard's house for the class and things are awkward at first. Howard has everyone sitting on the floor with their shoes off. When Howard has the group try and talk honestly about each other, things start to get heated. Everyone leaves mad at each other. The next day, Howard, wearing his suit again, comes to apologize to Sam. Howard says he now realizes that if the truth is going to hurt someone, it might not be worth saying. Fred Sadoff as Leader. Royce D. Applegate as Guy with Headband.
55	3	"Goober's New Gas Station"	Hal Cooper	T : Bob Ross; S/T : David Evans	September 28, 1970
Goober opens his new gas station in a location in town. Goober is digging a hole to dump oil into and shows Howard some large bones he found. Howard believes they're dinosaur bones and takes them to the Raleigh Museum. Dr. Wallace (Roy Glenn) confirms it is a dinosaur skull. Howard would like to donate it to the museum, but they already have several on display. Dr. Wallace suggests displaying it in Mayberry and if Howard could find the rest of the skeleton, that would be even better. Howard tells Sam and Emmett he would like to open a museum in Mayberry. Howard wants to dig up Goober's driveway for a couple of weeks, but Goober refuses. Howard calls for a special meeting of the Mayberry Development Committee. Sam says that one can't just dig up someone's private property. During the night, Howard goes to the station and starts digging. One night, Goober catches Howard digging and as Deputy Sheriff, Goober arrests him. Sam makes Goober release Howard from jail, but Sam also tells Howard that what he did was wrong. Howard is allowed to dig in the street and he does find more bones. He opens the towns museum and displays the dinosaur skeleton with a missing midsection. When children ask why the dinosaur has no middle, Goober has a change of heart. He lets Howard dig up the driveway of his station to get the rest of the dinosaur bones. Alice Backes as Miss Fawcett. Janice Carroll as Mother.
56	4	"The New Housekeeper"	Christian Nyby	Perry Grant & Dick Bensfield	October 5, 1970
Mayberry is installing a new flag pole. Sam tells Goober and Howard that he got a letter from Aunt Bee. She is going to be staying with her sister for quite a while. Sam's cousin Alice Cooper (Alice Ghostley), a recently discharged 20-year career Army sergeant, is going to stay with them. After she arrives, Alice wonders if she'll have trouble adjusting to civilian life. Alice meets Goober at his station and slightly offends him when she seems to know as much about car engines as he does. Despite being friendly, she winds up rubbing those she meets the wrong way. Sam invites Alice to a Council meeting for the flag pole dedication. Alice volunteers several times to help, but is rebuffed. She is finally allowed to bake an important patriotic three-tiered cake. Things don't well and the cake is a failure. Alice tells Sam she's won't go to the ceremony. Sam explains to the ladies that there won't be a cake and they are very upset. Tommy, who was to play the bugle during the flag raising, hurts his lip. Sam thinks he has a solution. At the ceremony, Alice shows up in her uniform and plays the bugle beautifully during the raising. Everyone thanks her. Ted Gehring as Foreman. Helen Page Camp as Grace Johnson. Note: Last episode to feature Clara Edwards (Hope Summers).
57	5	"All for Charity"	Christian Nyby	Bob Mosher	October 12, 1970
Millie is directing the church's pageant entitled "The Rites of Spring". Goober is cast as a tree and Emmett as robin redbreast. Emmett is not thrilled about having to wear the costume. Sam is in charge of ticket sales and publicity. Millie tells Sam that Mike is to play a lamb and gives Sam the costume to give him. Mike is not happy about the lamb costume because he thinks his friends will make fun of him. Sam tells him it is for his church and for charity and everyone has to do their part. Millie comes by and brings Sam a dancing Pan costume that she wants him to wear for the pageant. Sam doesn't want to wear the costume. He tells Millie that while he'd love to do it, he's just too busy with other things. Harold tells Mike that he heard that Sam chickened out of being in the pageant. Mike asks Sam why he has to play the lamb if Sam won't play the part of Pan. Sam tries to justify his not wanting to be in the play, but neither Mike nor Alice really buy his story. It is the night of the pageant and Sam joins the cast. Janos Prohaska as Bear. Jodie Foster as Little Girl. Note: Ken Berry and Paul Hartman, both professional dancers in their younger days, show off their dance moves in this episode.
58	6	"Hair"	Christian Nyby	Perry Grant & Dick Bensfield	October 19, 1970
Concerned about his thinning hair, Emmett is secretly having hair treatments from Earl the barber (Allan Melvin). Earl suggests that Emmett buy a toupee. Emmett tells Sam that he's thinking about getting a toupee and what are Sam's thoughts on it. While going over the checkbook, Martha finds out that Emmett spent $125. He tells her that what he bought is a secret. When the toupee arrives, the hair is sculpted very messy. Emmett goes to Earl to see if there's something he can do to neaten it up. Earl suggests going to La Petite Beauty Salon and have Sally work on it. Emmett meets up with Sally before the salon opens and he hopes she can give him "the Glen Campbell look". Sam, Millie and Goober walk by the salon and Goober sees Emmett inside. Millie and Sam try to be encouraging. Emmett goes home to show Martha and she says it makes him look so much younger. Martha then looks at herself in the mirror and starts crying as she looks older. Not wanting Martha to be sad, Emmett decides to send the toupee back.
59	7	"Millie the Best-Dressed Woman"	Hal Cooper	Bob Mosher	October 26, 1970
Howard turns in his "Mayberry Happenings" news column to his editor Carl Brady (Ivor Francis) of the Mount Pilot Clarion. Carl tells Howard that his fashion editor, Pamela Bennington (Judith McConnell), has made a list of the five best-dressed women in the county. Millie was ranked number one based on Pamela's observations at social gatherings over the past year. Pamela states that Millie was picked for her natural instinctive clothes sense and refreshing simplicity. Howard tells Millie she's going to be a style setter from now on. Millie goes to Mt. Pilot and buys a new dress and boots. She shows Sam the dress and it is longer than he expected. The women, however, love the midi length look. Martha now wants to get rid of all her short dresses and wants a new wardrobe. Emmett holds a meeting of some of the local husbands and they want Sam to talk Millie into wearing short dresses again. Sam doesn't feel he has the right to tell Millie what to wear. Meanwhile, Carl tells Howard that there's a plaque that is to be given to Millie. Howard suggests that Pamela attend a Woman's Club dance at Mayberry and present the plaque to Millie. Emmett and Elmo want Howard to cancel Pamela's appearance but he refuses. The night of the dance, Howard introduces Pamela to everyone. When Howard removes her coat, it is revealed that she is wearing a mini dress. Joan Tompkins as Emily. Ken Sansom as Clarence.
60	8	"Howard's Nephew"	Christian Nyby	Bob Mosher	November 2, 1970
Howard gets a call from his sister Marge, who's having problems with her 16 year old son, Spud. Howard tells her to have Spud spend a week with him. When he arrives, Howard is surprised to find Spud has turned into a hippie. Spud tells Howard that he dropped out of school. Sam and Emmett come by to meet Spud and Howard is clearly embarrassed. Spud tells the men he likes what he's seen of Mayberry so far. Howard learns that Spud has no interest in school or getting a job, he just wants to be a free spirit. Spud wants the lifestyle embodied by Henry David Thoreau and withdraw from civilization. All he wants to do is live in a shack in the woods and "forget everything". Sam has a shack out on his property and he suggests letting Spud live there to see if he'd really like it. Mike goes out to visit Spud and Spud says he has plenty to do. But actually, Spud is getting bored. Spud comes by Sam's house and offers to help Sam cut some wood. It is not long before Spud comes back to Howard's house.
61	9	"Goober the Housekeeper"	Hal Cooper	Bob Mosher	November 9, 1970
Wealthy Mr. Fremont (Willis Bouchey) is going away to Europe. His housekeeper is on vacation and he hates to have his 22-room Oak Hill mansion empty. Mr. Fremont offers Goober the job of housekeeper and the use of his Rolls Royce. After moving in to the mansion, Goober decides to have lunch at the ritzy Whispering Pines Hotel. Goober is seated at a table next to pretty Diane Willoughby (Nancy Priddy) and asks her to join him. Diane mentions that her and her Mother (Natalie Schafer) are staying at the hotel for a week. Mrs. Willoughby discovers Goober is driving a Rolls Royce and suddenly takes an interest in him. When she asks Goober what he does for a living, he says he's in "oil". Goober, to keep up appearances, invites them to the mansion. On the way, they drive past Sam. Goober introduces him as "Farmer Jones" and Sam kind of takes offense at Goober acting so snobbish. Back at the mansion, Goober addresses Emmett, who's there fixing the garbage disposable, as "Mr. Clark" and "my good man". Emmett takes offense at that. Back in town, Goober apologizes to Sam and Emmett for putting on airs. He says when he gets to know Diane better, he'll tell her the truth. After spending time together during the week, Goober is about to tell Diane the truth. Diane confides in Goober that she doesn't like dishonesty and wanted to let Goober know that they are broke. Later, Goober does finally tell Mrs. Willoughby and Diane the truth. Diane is happy and Mrs. Willoughby faints. Mr. Fremont comes home and Mrs. Willoughby is happy to meet him and starts flirting with him. Goober does wind up telling Diane another lie about himself. Charles Briles as Parking Lot Attendant.
62	10	"Millie's Dream"	Christian Nyby	Gene Thompson	November 16, 1970
Sam and Millie were hoping to spend a quiet evening together, but Goober shows up and hangs around. Sam reminds Millie about his fishing trip that weekend with Howard. Millie has a bad dream that night. The next morning Millie tells Sam and Howard she dreamed something bad was going to happen on the trip and she wishes that they didn't go. She gets upset when they don't take her seriously. Later, Millie tries talking to Howard again and gives him a book on dreams. Mailman Felton (Norman Leavitt) brings Howard a check from the treasury department. Howard runs into Millie and she tells him she dreamed that he came into some money. When Howard tells Millie about the check, Millie begs Howard not to go on the trip. Howard is starting to have doubts about the trip but won't admit it to Sam. At the campsite, Howard is acting very cautious and Sam can tell. Howard even brought along some things for protection. The next morning, Sam suggests that they leave for home early. Sam drops Howard at his house and jokes that he made it home safe. Goober and Millie are waiting for Sam at his house. Sam drives up and as he's telling the two from his car that nothing bad happened on the trip, he drives into his garage door.
63	11	"Community Spirit"	Christian Nyby	Bob Mosher	November 23, 1970
Sam needs his house painted. Sam tells his friends that the out-of-town painting contractor gave a high estimate and a 3 month wait time. After Sam leaves, Howard suggests that he, Emmett and Goober paint the house for free as a community friendship deal. Howard figures they could get it done in one day. Sam says he found a painter in Mt. Pilot and he wouldn't want to impose on his friends. The men won't take no for an answer and will start painting the next day. The next morning the guys show up, but instead of starting right away, they sit around and have some coffee. Then they discuss which brushes to use and other things which start to annoy Sam. The men are doing a sloppy job and soon break for lunch. After lunch, Sam realizes that parts of the house have been painted different shades of color. Sam has had enough and tells his friends to leave. Sam is able to get the Mt. Pilot painter to squeeze him in and do the job. Sam is about to go into town to apologize to his friends when they arrive at his house. The guys are about to apologize to Sam, when they take a look at the house. They see how great it turned out. Sam lets them think that it was their job and doesn't tell them about the other painter. Note: This is the first episode of Mayberry R.F.D. that Millie's last name is Summers and not Swanson.
64	12	"The Harp"	Hal Cooper	Perry Grant & Dick Bensfield	November 30, 1970
Sam, Mike and Alice are in an antique shop. Alice sees a large golden harp and buys it. Howard and Emmett come by Sam's house to see it. Alice would like to take lessons and Howard suggests she call the Mt. Pilot Conservatory of Music. They connect Alice with Professor Radetsky (Leonid Kinskey). What she doesn't know is that he hasn't had a student in three years. After meeting the Professor, Alice tells Sam how much she is looking forward to taking lessons from him. Radetsky comes by the house to start with the lesson. Alice finds him to be more strict and critical than she anticipated. After several lessons, nothing she does seems to please the Professor and Alice decides to quit taking lessons. She asks Sam to tell Radetsky. Radetsky begs Sam to tell Alice he will be less demanding. Alice continues with the lessons and makes some progress. Radetsky would like to have her perform at a recital with the other students of the Conservatory. It is the night of the recital and despite a little stage fright, Alice plays well. After the recital, Sam tells Mike how he should think about taking up an instrument. Mike pretends to be asleep. Ken Sansom as Mr. Ferguson.
65	13	"The Bicycle Club"	Hal Cooper	Walter Black	December 7, 1970
Howard is playing basketball when Sam, Goober and Emmett walk by. Howard says he's doing it to develop his muscles. Goober and Sam join him and Emmett goes off to shoot pool. Howard suggests forming a bicycle club that goes riding in the country each weekend. They decide to not mention it to Emmett due to his age and the strenuous nature of bike riding. Millie lets it slip to Emmett about the club. Emmett angrily confronts the other three men. Emmett defends his stamina and health and the others apologize and welcome him into their "Mayberry Red Devils" club. Elmo makes fun of Emmett for wanting to ride a bike at his age. The men head off on their first bike ride. Sam, Goober and Howard wind up way ahead of Emmett. They finish lunch just as Emmett catches up. The three decide to head back to town. Emmett tells them to start without him and he'll catch up. It is night time before Emmett makes it back to Mayberry. The next day, Emmett is so sore he can barely move. It is time for their next ride and the four take off. Emmett lags behind again, but flags down a friend to secretly transport him in his truck to get ahead of the others. The three are surprised to see Emmett at the picnic area ahead of them. After lunch Emmett tells the others to start without him. On the way, a truck passes the men and they see Emmett's bike in the back. The men feel bad for Emmett, but know his pride won't let him quit the club. Howard finds out that a bike shop in Mt. Pilot bought Emmett's bike. Emmett tells the men that his bike was stolen and he can't afford another one.
66	14	"Mike's Project"	Hal Cooper	Perry Grant & Dick Bensfield	December 14, 1970
Mike's class is to make a Wild West display for the school's open house. Teacher Miss Pringle (Alice Backes) introduces Howard to the class. He's there to speak to the students about the civic importance of the projects. Mike makes a small teepee, but it doesn't turn out too well. Goober asks Sam if he's going to help Mike fix it up. Sam says that it is Mike's project and he has to stand on his own. Mike's friend Harold tells him about the fort that he's building. Sam learns that Harold's father, Brian (William Mims), is helping build the fort. Sam sees the fort and it is quite impressive. Sam encourages Mike to improve his teepee, but Mike is just happy that his project is done. Mike starts to make another teepee and Sam is helping. Brian comes by, sees the new teepee and can tell that Sam helped. Brian tells Sam about some of the improvements that were made to the fort. Brian and Sam get into an argument over which child is more talented. It is the day of the open house and Harold and Brian bring in their fort. Sam and Mike then come in with a very large teepee, tree and canoe display. Many of the students feel their projects are inferior even though they worked very hard on them. Miss Pringle gives the blue ribbon to a girl for her home made pottery. Sam is about to explain about Mike's project, when Miss Pringle tells him she knows how competitive fathers can be.
67	15	"Howard the Dream Spinner"	Hal Cooper	Bob Mosher	December 28, 1970
At the diner, Sam introduces Goober to the new waitress, Edna Pritchard (Maggie Peterson). Howard tells Sam that his "Mayberry Happenings" column in the Mt. Pilot newspaper has caught the attention of the "big brass". They also own the TV station and would like him to do a 15-minute TV show called "The Poet's Corner" three afternoons a week. The next day, on TV, Howard is introduced by the announcer (Dick Whittinghill) as Howard, "The Dream Spinner". Later, Howard walks into Sam's office wearing a sporty leisure suit, sunglasses, and an air of arrogance. He tells Sam and Alice about his fan mail. Howard reads a woman's fan letter and poem to Emmett and Goober and tells them he plans to use it on his program. Howard puts down the guys poem suggestions and makes them feel inferior. After Howard leaves, the two decide to trick Howard. They'll send him a fan letter and poem, but make it look as though a woman named Melissa wrote it. Goober then asks Edna to copy the letter so it is in a woman's handwriting. Goober and Emmett get a big laugh when they watch Howard read "Melissa's" letter. The two tell Sam what they did and Sam tells them that practical jokes can get out of hand. Goober and Emmett then have Edna copy another letter asking Howard to touch his mustache on air as a signal to Melissa. Edna is starting to have doubts about what the guys are doing. Howard tells Sam that despite having never met her, he thinks he's falling in love with Melissa. Sam tries to get Howard to not pursue the matter any further. Sam tells Goober and Emmett that they better tell Howard the truth. The two talk to Howard and apologize. Howard gets another letter from Melissa. He goes to talk to Edna to get her to stop helping Goober and Emmett. She reads him the letter and it is an apology from her. Howard and Edna wind up going on a date together.
68	16	"Millie's Egg Farm"	Christian Nyby	Perry Grant & Dick Bensfield	January 11, 1971
Howard and Goober are at the Diner. Howard tells Goober that he should invest in other things besides keeping all his money in the bank. Sam and Millie come in. Howard mentions that Mrs. Plunkett (Alice Nunn) is selling her egg farm and moving to Florida. Sam says it could be a good investment. Millie talks to Alice about buying the farm. They go to look at the place, but Alice doesn't think Millie knows enough about the business. Sam thinks it will be too much work and tries to talk her out of it, but Millie buys the farm. Millie is excited at first, but when she overreacts to a few things, Sam tells her it was a dumb idea to buy the place. Millie gets mad and despite the fact that they are now neighbors, she tells Sam she doesn't need any of his help. Howard finds out that Millie hasn't gotten that many eggs yet and he would like to help. Howard thinks that playing music for the chickens will help. Goober and Howard get into an argument over which record to play. Goober and Howard then blame Sam for talking her into buying the place. Sam goes to apologize to Millie about their fight. Millie admits that the farm is just too much for her. A Phil Schinder (Kay E. Kuter) drives up and introduces himself to Sam. Phil was wondering if the farm was for sale. Millie only had the place for a week, but she sells it for a small profit. Later, Goober sees an add for raising chinchillas and wants to show it to Millie. Sam throws the add in the garbage.
69	17	"The Kid from Hong Kong"	Christian Nyby	Milton Pascal & Sam Locke	January 18, 1971
Mike has saved up $35 and is thinking of buying a camera. He actually only earn $10 of that and Sam says he can spend that. With the money left, Sam would like him to put $15 in his savings account and give the rest to someone less fortunate. Mike talks to Reverend Keith (Robert Cornthwaite), who suggests $10 would pay a year's tuition for a student at a Hong Kong missionary school. In China, Reverend Strook (Phil Chambers) tells young Kim Lee that she now has a foster father named Mike Jones. Kim Lee writes Mike a letter saying how happy she is that he is her foster father. She includes her report card and a picture of herself. Howard tells Mike about the relationships of Chinese parents and children. Mike and Kim Lee write each other frequently and he gives her a lot of advice. Mr. and Mrs. Kenworthy (Charles Bateman and Jean Howell) tell Reverend Strook that they would like to adopt Kim Lee. They would like to take Kim Lee to Washington D.C. to live. Kim Lee writes Mike and tells him about the adoption and wants to know if he is pleased. She's not sure she wants to live in D.C. Mike is a little disappointed that he isn't the father anymore. Sam suggests they go to Washington to meet Kim Lee and her new parents. In D.C., Sam and Mike meet Kim Lee and Mr. and Mrs. Kenworthy at the airport. At first Kim Lee thought Sam was her foster father, but then she meets Mike. Mike tells her that her new parents seem very nice and that Washington looks like a nice place to live. Kim Lee is glad that Mike is pleased. Sam and Mike learn that Mr. Kenworthy is a Congressman.
70	18	"The Moon Rocks"	Christian Nyby	Perry Grant & Dick Bensfield	January 25, 1971
Sam is at Duke University to attend a City Managers Conference. He runs into an old friend, Pete Winslow (Gary Crosby), who is now working for NASA. Pete is there as part of a Moon rock exhibit. Sam asks if Pete could bring the rocks to Mayberry, but Pete says he's on a very tight schedule. Sam knows Howard would love to see the rocks. He talks Pete into coming to Mayberry, but only to show Howard the rocks, no one else. It has to be a secret. Sam calls Howard, tells him about the rocks and to keep it a secret. Unfortunately, Goober over hears the call. Goober doesn't keep the secret for long when he lets it slip about the rocks to Tom (Eddie Firestone) and Eddie, two boasting Weaver City men. Emmett also overhears what Goober said. It is not long before word is all over town. When Sam finds out, he says that he's going to call Pete and cancel the whole thing. Everyone is now mad and disappointed and giving Sam a hard time. Tom and Eddie come by and ask Goober where the Moon rocks are. They now believe Goober made the whole thing up. To save face, Goober tries to pass off one of Howard's rocks as the moon rock. But the men don't fall for it. Soon there's an article in the Weaver City newspaper about the Mayberry Moon rock hoax. Sam goes to speak to Pete again. While's Sam's there, Pete gets a call from his boss and is told to bring the rocks to Mayberry. During the showing of the rocks, Sam is introduced to Charles Hendricks (Tyler McVey), Pete's boss. Sam asks Charles why he brought the rocks to Mayberry. It turns out that Goober wrote a letter to the State Senator and the Senator thought Goober was a disappointed little boy. Maudie Prickett as Myrtle.
71	19	"The World Traveler"	Hal Cooper	Dick Bensfield & Perry Grant	February 8, 1971
Martha receives a postcard from her friends Marian and Charles who are in Paris. She hints to Sam and Emmett that she would like to go to Europe. That night at dinner, Martha keeps talking about Europe and Emmett says they can't afford it. Emmett is trying to go to sleep and Martha tricks him into saying they'll make the trip. Emmett tells Sam, Goober and Howard how he's stuck going on the trip. Sam offers to take Emmett to a travel agency in Mt. Pilot. The travel agent suggests several package tours but they are all too expensive for Emmett. Emmett gets the agent to cut the trip down to just 6 days in London and Paris. Later, Emmett, Martha, Millie and Howard are at Sam's house for dinner. Everyone is talking about all the places Martha and Emmett should see. Emmett doesn't say anything about the short, cheap trip. Emmett finally tells Martha about the trip and she is furious. She says she's not going to Europe to just see two towns. Millie and Alice want Sam to talk to Emmett. Sam suggests some kind of compromise and Emmett agrees. Martha and Emmett wind up getting into another fight. Martha says she'll go by herself. Emmett tells Sam that another reason he doesn't want to go is that he's afraid he won't know how to act in Europe. Sam says he has nothing to worry about. Emmett and Martha return from their trip and tell everyone about all the things they saw.
72	20	"Goober the Elder"	Christian Nyby	Perry Grant & Dick Bensfield	February 15, 1971
After Sunday service, Reverend Keith tells the church elders that they will have to fill a vacancy as Elder George is moving. Sam suggests Goober, but Howard is against it. Goober is excited at the prospect. Goober hides the church collection money in his gas station until he can deposit it the next day. Goober gets a phone call from his mooching cousin Elbert. Elbert asks Goober for $100 for a supposed medical issue. Goober reluctantly says he knows where he can borrow the money from and takes it from the collection money. Elbert is actually in a poker game in his hotel room. Later, Goober calls Sam and tells him he's in the Mt. Pilot jail. He would like Sam to bail him out. Goober tells Sam about Elbert's hard luck story. Just as Goober got to the hotel room, Elbert's poker game got raided. The Sergeant (James Jeter) tells Goober that they are keeping the collection money as evidence in the case. Goober is worried that people in town will find out about his arrest. It is not long before the story makes the Mt. Pilot newspaper. The paper even has a picture of Goober holding the money at the poker game. Sam tells Goober about a special Board of Elders meeting to vote on him being an elder. Howard questions Goober and implies that he just took the money. Goober withdraws his name as an elder and leaves. Sam defends Goober and the elders unanimously vote Goober in. The police clear Goober of all charges. Ken Sansom as Clarence.
73	21	"Alice and the Professor"	Christian Nyby	Charles Stewart and Bob Mosher	February 22, 1971
Alice is still taking harp lessons from Professor Wolfgang Radetsky. Sam tells Millie how much time Radetsky is spending teaching Alice. Millie wonders if Wolfgang has feelings for Alice. Sam doesn't think so. Back at home, Alice invites Wolfgang to stay for dinner. Alice goes out of her way to cook something special. Wolfgang would like to pay Alice back for her kindness by taking her on a picnic in the country. Howard and Millie believe that a romance is blooming, but Sam still thinks there's nothing to it. Back at home, Sam finds a note saying that Alice and Wolfgang went to Mt. Pilot to see a movie. The next morning Alice tells Sam that Wolfgang is taking her to dinner on Saturday night. She says that Wolfgang suggested that Sam and Millie come along as a double date. Alice then says that Wolfgang "turns her on". The two couples dine at Morelli's. Wolfgang tells them that he had Mr. Morelli put a record in the jukebox of a waltz that he had composed. Alice and Wolfgang dance to the record. The next day, Wolfgang would like to have a private talk with Sam and Sam is worried it might be about marriage. Alice tells Sam that despite enjoying Wolfgang's company, she doesn't want to marry him. She asks Sam to let him down easy. Sam talks to Wolfgang and it turns out he doesn't want to get married either. Sam doesn't tell Alice this, but tells her everything is OK between the two.
74	22	"Howard the Swinger"	Elliott Lewis	Perry Grant & Dick Bensfield	March 1, 1971
The Mt. Pilot newspaper's fashion editor Pamela Bennington's car breaks down and Goober tows it to his gas station. Howard gives her a ride to her Mt. Pilot apartment building, which is the singles only Riviera Park. Pamela gives Howard a goodbye kiss. Howard tells the guys that he sublet an apartment there for two months. Sam and Goober help Howard move. Howard asks Jane Mullins, another tenant, where his apartment is. Howard decides to hold an open house party this coming Saturday. Howard runs into Pamela and is surprised to meet her boyfriend, Pete. When his friends ask if Pamela was happy to see him, Howard doesn't mention her boyfriend. At his building, Howard tries picking up a girl named Susie, but that doesn't go well. Howard asks Jane to his party. He then runs into Pamela who says she broke up with Pete. Howard tells Sam that he has two dates for the party. He hopes to set Goober up with Jane. At the party, both ladies think they are with Howard and he has to juggle between them as Goober isn't there yet. Goober finally shows up and feeling bad for Jane, Howard sets Pamela up with him. Things go well until Goober walks Pamela back to her apartment and runs into Pete.
75	23	"Mike's Car"	Hal Cooper	Dick Bensfield & Perry Grant	March 8, 1971
While Sam picks up a hubcap at Mt. Pilot Motors, Mike sits in a new convertible pretending to drive it. Sam tells Mike to start saving his money so he can buy a car when he's older. Mike gets a part-time job working at Goober's gas station. Goober has an old beat up car that doesn't run at his station. Mike buys it from him for $30. Mike tells Sam that he'll work on the car and that he quit his job. Mike's friends, Harold and Denny, make fun of him for having a car that doesn't run. Mike is pressured into putting the tractor battery into the car. The car starts and Mike reluctantly drives it. The brakes don't work and Mike runs over the mailbox and then drives into a ditch. When Mike tells Sam what happened, Sam gets angry. Sam talks Goober into giving Mike a traffic ticket to teach him a lesson. Afterwards, Sam wants to tear up the ticket but Goober tells him it is official. Sam will have to face a judge as his name is on the registration. Sam tells Alice that the Judge reprimanded him for even letting Mike have the car. Mike does something that makes Sam proud of him again.
76	24	"Goober the Hero"	Hal Cooper	Bob Mosher	March 15, 1971
Howard reminds Sam and Mike that this Saturday is the 10 mile hike for the Junior Woodsmen. After Howard leaves, Mike says the other boys want a different location this year, Indian Caves. Goober offers to be the guide because he played in them as a child and knows the territory well. It's the day of the hike and Goober leads Sam, Howard and the boys into the cave. While Howard is explaining some of the rock formations, Goober wanders off and gets separated from the group. Thinking Goober went back to get some food, the group makes its way back out of the cave. When they don't find Goober outside, the men decide to take the boys home. They'll then come back with some help to find Goober. Back in town, Sam says he got a hold of Ted Barnsdale, the county geologist, and he knows the caves very well. But he won't arrive until morning. The next day, Sheriff Matson (James Westerfield) brings Ted to the cave. Goober wakes up, sees some light and finds his way out of the cave. He sees a remote shack and learns it's the home of "Old Man" Harvey Benson (Burt Mustin). On Harvey's TV is a news report about people hunting the caves for Goober. Harvey tells Goober that he can't just show up at the cave because people have put a lot of time and effort into searching for him. The people have to find Goober in the cave. Everyone is thrilled when Goober is found. Something Goober says makes Sam and Howard a little suspicious. Note: This episode is clearly similar to The Andy Griffith Show episode "Barney and the Cave Rescue".
77	25	"The City Planner"	Hal Cooper	Charles Stewart and Bob Mosher	March 22, 1971
At the town council meeting, Sam announces that a representative of the company City Planners will make a survey of the town. The person will make suggestions to help improve industry and the towns image. With Sam expecting the city planner to keep him busy for a week, Millie decides to visit her sister in Atlanta. Representative Terry Philips (Ruta Lee) arrives and she turns out to be quite attractive. Sam takes Terry to various places in town and she meets some of the people. Howard suggests that Sam take Terry to Morelli's. At the restaurant, Gino shows Sam and Terry the photo booth that Mr. Morelli put in. The two take a few photos. The next day, Sam takes Terry to Meier's lake and Terry suggests possibly developing the area. They then go up into a tree house nearby. Howard comes by with his nature group and Sam and Terry want to avoid being seen together. They then get rained on. Later, Millie calls Sam and says she will be home that afternoon. Terry gives Sam her report and says it's too bad all the good men are taken. Sam and Millie go to Morelli's and use the photo booth. Millie winds up seeing the pictures Sam took with Terry. When Sam tries to come up with an explanation, Millie tells him she heard all about Terry. Alice Backes as Miss Pringle.
78	26	"Emmett's Invention"	Hal Cooper	John McGreevey	March 29, 1971
Amalgamated Dynamics sends Emmett a letter saying they are interested in acquiring a patent he created in 1932. Patent Counsel T.J. Fowler (Bill Quinn) will be coming to Mayberry to speak to him. Now Emmett has to try and remember what invention the patent was for. He decides it must be a screw that won't allow an old time phonograph to be cranked too tightly. Emmett is looking forward to coming into a lot of money. Emmett's ego gets a boost when Howard says that Amalgamated may use his invention in the space industry. Mr. Fowler arrives and tells Emmett that they will be using a device created by their own engineers. It's just that Emmett's invention is somewhat similar to theirs. They merely want to buy the rights for $400. Mr. Fowler bluntly says it's one of their "nuisance" settlements. Howard pressures Emmett for information about the deal for the article he wants to write about Emmett. Emmett doesn't tell Howard and Sam want really happened. Emmett tells Martha that with all the bragging he did, how can he now face people. Emmett is so embarrassed that he feels his only choice is to pack up and move. People eventually find out what happened and Sam goes to speak with Mr. Fowler. They come up with a way for Emmett to feel like a big man.
