= Glen Ash =

American actor

- Glen Ash in Petticoat Junction 1969
- Born: October 3, 1931
- Died: March 23, 2018 (aged 86)

Glen Ash, also billed as Glenn Ash, was an American actor and comedian. In 1948 Glen Ash was stationed in Tokyo, Japan, with the 16th Communication Squadron (TAF) as a lineman and repairman. He was a corporal in the United States Air Force. He began to play a J-45 Gibson guitar owned by PFC Lester St. Andrie and after a couple of months could play the chords of almost any song he heard. Glen left the Air Force and went to Florida, where he appeared for a few years before leaving for California. He could play the banjo and fiddle along with guitar. In 1965 he made an appearance in Baton Rouge, Louisiana, where he reunited with St. Andrie, who was a United States Army recruiter.

Ash was discovered by Don Knotts, who introduced Ash to television audiences as host of The Hollywood Palace in 1968. As a result, Ash made the appearances on The Leslie Uggams Show, Gomer Pyle, U.S.M.C., Mayberry RFD, The Glen Campbell Goodtime Hour, Petticoat Junction (as Glen Tinker in the 1969 episode: "The Glen Tinker Caper"), among others, during the 1969–70 season.

In addition, in Ash was cast as town councilman Buff McKnight on The New Andy Griffith Show in 1971, making just two appearances before CBS cancelled the program.

He would make occasional television appearances after that, including on M*A*S*H and Hart to Hart.

His most recent role was in the TV movie Blindsided (1993). Ash died on March 23, 2018.
