= Barney Fife =

Fictional character

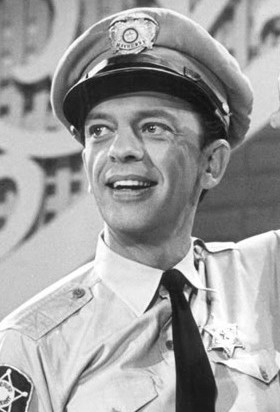
- Don Knotts as Barney Fife
- First appearance: "The New Housekeeper"; The Andy Griffith Show; October 3, 1960
- Last appearance: Return to Mayberry; April 13, 1986
- Portrayed by: Don Knotts
- Voiced by: Dana Gould (The Simpsons)

In-universe information
- Full name: Bernard P. Fife
- Nickname: Barn
- Occupation: Deputy sheriff
- Significant others: Thelma Lou; Juanita Beasley; Hilda Mae
- Relatives: Sheriff Andy Taylor (cousin); Opie Taylor (cousin once removed)

Bernard "Barney" Fife (Note: Fife's middle name was inconsistent. In one episode, Andy states that Barney's middle name is Oliver. In later episodes, Barney refers to himself as "Barney 'P.' Fife", but in another episode the Mayberry Union High School yearbook lists Barney's name as Bernard Milton Fife.) is a fictional character in the American television program The Andy Griffith Show, portrayed by comic actor Don Knotts. Barney Fife is a deputy sheriff in the slow-paced, sleepy, southern community of Mayberry, North Carolina. He appeared in the first five seasons (1960–65) as a main character, and after leaving the show towards the end of season five, made a few guest appearances in the three color seasons (1965–68). He also appeared in the first episode of the spin-off series Mayberry R.F.D. (1968–1971), and in the 1986 reunion television film Return to Mayberry. Additionally, Barney appeared in the Joey Bishop Show episode "Joey's Hideaway Cabin", and unnamed in the first episode of The New Andy Griffith Show.

In 1999, TV Guide ranked Barney Fife ninth on its 50 Greatest TV Characters of All Time list.

== Concept and creation ==
According to Andy Griffith, the character of Barney Fife was suggested by Don Knotts himself. At the same time The Steve Allen Show was ending, Knotts was looking for work. When he saw the episode of The Danny Thomas Show featuring Andy Taylor, he called Griffith suggesting that his sheriff character might reasonably need a deputy. Griffith liked the idea and suggested that he call Executive Producer Sheldon Leonard. Griffith later recalled that Don Knotts' contribution was the show's saving grace because he was uncomfortable with the original concept to have Andy Taylor being the comic lead. In an interview with The Archive of American Television, Griffith admitted, "The second episode was called 'Manhunt' and I knew by that episode that Don should be the comic and I should play straight for him. That made all the difference."

Fife appeared on The Andy Griffith Show from the show's beginning in 1960 until 1965, when Knotts left the show to pursue a career in feature films. It is explained that Fife had left Mayberry to take a job as a detective in Raleigh, North Carolina. In reality, Knotts left because Griffith said he would end the show after 5 seasons, only for Griffith to change his mind, but Knotts decided to honor his commitment and left the series, thinking he would not get another chance to make movies. Knotts reprised the character in guest appearances each season until The Andy Griffith Show left the air in 1968. Barney also appeared in the inaugural Mayberry R.F.D. episode, in which Andy and Helen Crump marry. In 1971, the character, whose name is not explicitly mentioned, appears in the premiere episode of The New Andy Griffith Show, visiting the mid-sized city of Greenwood to catch up with Mayor Andy Sawyer, who looks exactly like Andy Taylor and shares some of Taylor's earlier mannerisms and friendships with Fife, Goober Pyle, and Emmett Clark. Fifteen years passed before the character was again reprised in the reunion film Return to Mayberry in 1986. By then, Fife had moved back and become the town's acting sheriff.

== Characterization ==
Barney Fife is outwardly smug and self-important, covering up his insecurities and low self-confidence with a display of bravado. He presents himself as an expert on such diverse subjects as firearms, martial arts, women, singing, wilderness survival, psychology, and American history. He frequently tries to impress others with his knowledge or skill in areas where his expertise is quite limited. He wishes to be perceived as "a man of the world", but he is quite naïve, and his fear of appearing ignorant leaves him easily duped. This gullibility is evident when, for example, he is tricked into buying a lemon from a crafty old widow Although he believes himself a skilled singer, he has a tin ear although at other times, when he is not trying to show off, he has a pleasant singing voice, performing duets with Andy and his guitar. His attempts to impress others sometimes cause him to accidentally reveal both personal and police secrets, often with dire consequences. Barney can be emotional, and he often overreacts to challenging situations with panic, despair, or bug-eyed fear.

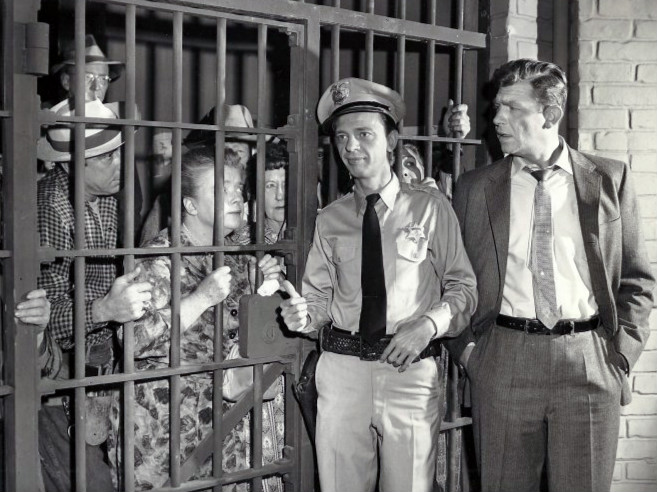
Andy returns from business in Raleigh to find Barney has locked all of Mayberry's citizens in the town jail.

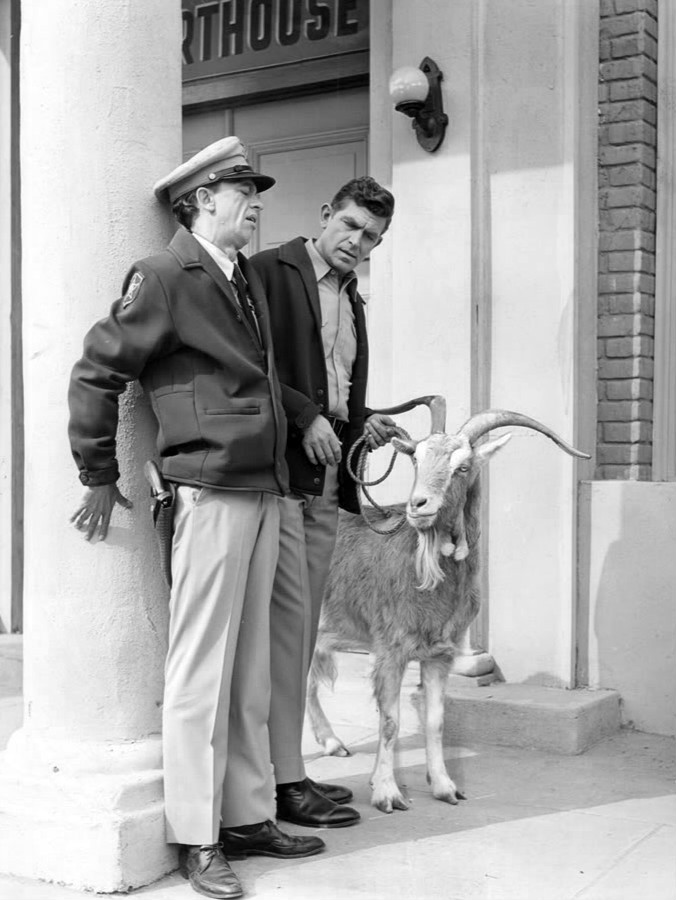
Barney panics when Andy and he need to deal with a goat that has eaten dynamite.

As a law enforcement officer, Barney is overly officious and insistent on doing things "by the book" to the point of absurdity. In one case when Andy was briefly summoned away, as acting sheriff, Barney proceeded to book and lock up everyone in town for various minor infractions ("Andy Saves Barney's Morale"). In at least one case, though, he is commended for his apparent overzealousness, after he tickets the state governor's car for being parked illegally. Barney tends to be alarmist and overreacts to potential dangers. In a case where he believed an ex-convict was coming back to Mayberry to attack Sheriff Taylor, he deputized Goober Pyle and Otis Campbell (who are even more inept) and attempted to provide 24-hour protection for the sheriff, although in fact no threat existed and the bodyguards did little except interfere with each other.

Barney is often frustrated with the primitive technological tools available to the Mayberry sheriff's department. He sometimes attempts to modernize the department by acquiring equipment of little use in sleepy Mayberry, such as an intercom system for the jailhouse and a search-and-rescue dog. On occasion, Barney believes his experience as a long-time deputy qualifies him to be a sheriff. In a second-season episode, he is offered the position of sheriff in the nearby town of Greendale, only to learn from Andy the difference between serving as sheriff versus deputy. He runs against Andy, only to later withdraw. In Return to Mayberry, Barney finally holds the position of "acting sheriff" of Mayberry and runs for the office proper, but at the end, encourages the town to vote for Andy, who has returned to Mayberry.

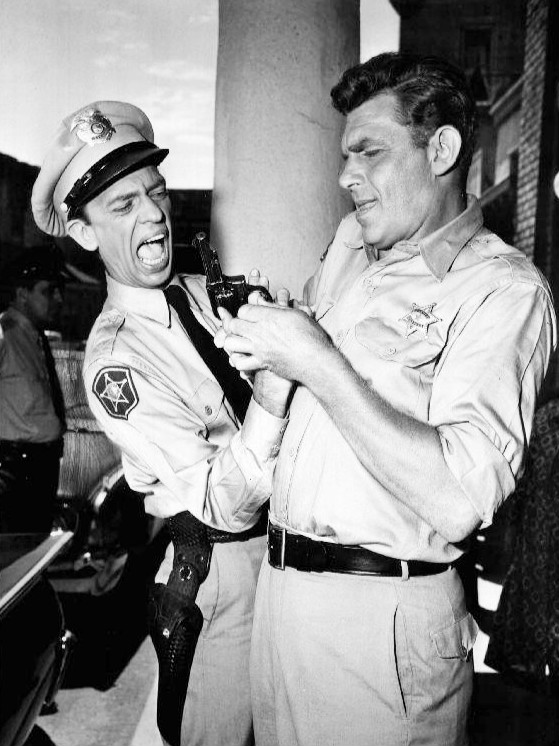
Andy comes to the rescue when Barney gets his gun stuck on his finger.

One frequent source of comedy is Barney's incompetence with firearms. After numerous negligent discharges (usually with a Smith & Wesson or Colt .38 caliber revolver), Andy restricts Barney to carrying his gun unloaded, with only one bullet in his shirt pocket, "in case of an emergency". However, Barney tends to load his gun unnecessarily, and often ends up firing it into the floor, the ceiling, or his own gun holster. The negligent discharge of Barney's gun becomes a running gag, usually followed by Barney sheepishly handing his gun to Andy. Another recurring gag has Barney locking himself or both Andy and himself in one of the jail cells, with the keys just out of reach. Another running gag is Barney being captured by escaped criminals twice. A third gag is that even when Barney is competent, the result backfires on him. In one episode, Barney drives a motorcycle/sidecar quite well on patrol, but Mayberry is so small a town that the motorcycle is practically useless for local law enforcement.

Nonetheless, Barney has rare moments of courage and competence, such as when he saves a member of the state police who has been captured by criminals, and apprehends the criminals by driving to the jail with the crooks and their hostage trapped in their trailer. This is one of the few occasions when Barney catches the crooks intentionally rather than by accident. When a vindictive newspaper publisher uses a female employee to trick Barney into revealing information about Andy to get the latter removed as sheriff (as revenge for getting a speeding citation which he neglected to pay), Barney redeems Andy and himself with a speech defending Andy and his record as sheriff. He explains how much of a benefit Andy is to Mayberry; then, in a rare display of candor and a departure from his usual insistence on following the letter of the law, he explains what Andy had been trying to teach him from the moment Barney first became a deputy — that a lawman does better in dealing with people when he goes more by the heart than by the book, thereby allowing Andy to remain sheriff.

Barney thinks of himself as a "ladies man," although he is committed to long-time girlfriend, Thelma Lou. In several episodes, Barney flirts with other women behind Thelma Lou's back, such as the unseen character, Juanita, a local waitress. Barney is easily duped by women who selfishly take advantage of either Barney's self-assured prowess as a romantic, or his naivety, usually to Barney's ultimate embarrassment and Thelma Lou's irritation. At the same time, Barney is protective of his relationship with Thelma Lou and easily becomes jealous when he thinks their relationship is threatened by other men. In several episodes, Barney overly concerns himself with Andy's love life, either by trying to manipulate Andy into dating certain women Barney thinks would be a good match; or, by misinterpreting Andy's relationship with girlfriend, Helen Crump, by presuming they are about to marry, and going to great lengths to spread that rumor, causing much confusion.

== Role in The Andy Griffith Show ==
In a few early episodes in the first season, Andy and Barney comment that they are cousins (initially as part of a joke implying that this relationship is responsible for Barney being hired as deputy), but this relationship is rarely mentioned later, and later episodes sometimes suggest that they are not related. Genetics aside, Barney and "Ange" (as he frequently addresses Andy, a derivation from Knotts' real-life nickname for Griffith) are best friends, having grown up together in Mayberry, and graduated from the same class at Mayberry Union High School in 1948. Barney maintains warm relations with Andy's son Opie and his Aunt Bee.

Although graduating from high school in 1948 (or 1945, depending on episode), both Barney and Andy claim to have served in the military. But unlike Andy, who was stationed in France during "the war", Barney was a file clerk who never left the United States (he stated that "me and this other fella ran the PX library" on Staten Island). Barney was nevertheless proud of his war record: "I did my part in helping to whip the dreaded Hun", he boasted in the episode "Quiet Sam".

Andy administered Barney his oath of office as deputy and issued him his gun in August 1953.

Barney is mentioned as residing in a few places during the course of the show. In the second-season episode "Sheriff Barney", his address is given at 411 Elm Street. By the fourth-season episode "Up in Barney's Room", he is residing in Mrs. Mendelbright's boarding house, where she forbids him from owning either a hot plate or light bulb over 40 watts. By episode’s end, though, she allows him to cook and use bulbs up to 100 watts. During his vacations, he takes a room at the Raleigh YMCA, as first mentioned in the third-season episode "Andy and Opie, Bachelors".

Barney's main girlfriend is a local girl, Thelma Lou (Betty Lynn), whom he eventually marries in Return to Mayberry, a 1986 NBC movie. He had two other girlfriends: Miss Rosemary followed by Hilda May. Barney also dates other women, in particular, a waitress at the Junction Cafe and Bluebird Diner named Juanita, with whom Barney has phone conversations, but who is never seen. She was first mentioned in the episode "Andy Forecloses".

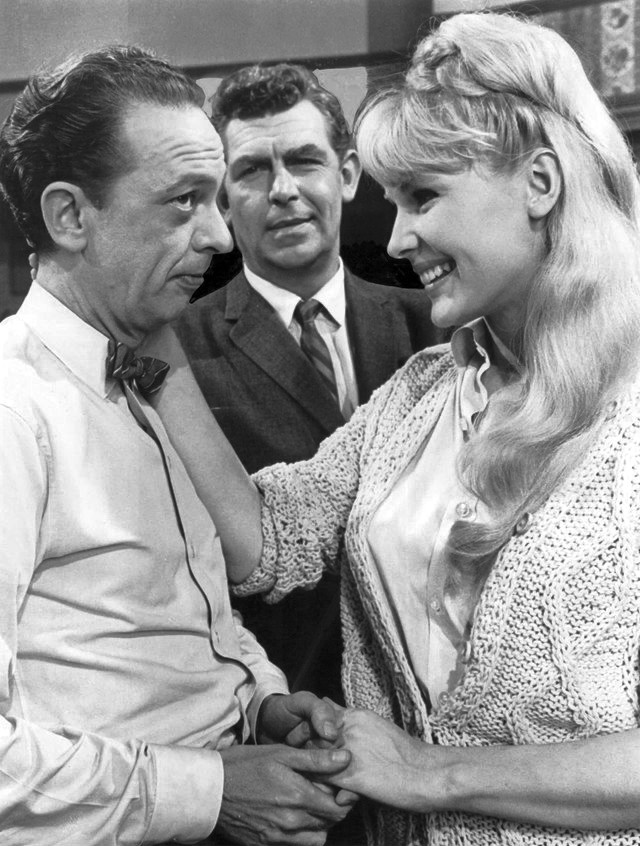
Barney becomes a hero in Raleigh when visiting Andy helps him solve a string of robberies.

When Don Knotts left the series in 1965 to pursue film roles, the character Barney Fife was said to have left Mayberry to join the police department in Raleigh. After that, the character remained mostly offscreen for the remainder of the show, although Knotts made five guest appearances as Barney Fife in the last three seasons. In one of those appearances, Andy visits Barney in Raleigh where Barney has been transferred from fingerprint analysis to the detective department; however, Andy discovers Barney is about to be fired for incompetence, but saves Barney’s job by solving a string of robberies and giving Barney credit.

As the series had several writers, occasional continuity errors occurred, most frequently in Barney's middle name, which changed each time it was referenced. For example, both Barney and Andy are given different middle names in different episodes. In the episode "Class Reunion", Barney's middle name is Milton, though at other times he is called "Bernard P. Fife". In another episode, where he believes he is the descendant of Nathan Tibbs, a Mayberry Revolutionary hero, he says his name is "Barney Tibbs Fife". Andy jokingly says, "I thought your middle name was Oliver." Another inconsistency is Barney's military service in WW II, which is not easily reconciled with his having graduated high school in 1948 (or 1945, depending on the episode) (although in fact World War II for the US officially ended December 31, 1946, by order of President Truman).

Although Barney and Andy are best friends, Andy is often exasperated with him. This includes various storylines showing Barney’s innocent disruptions of Andy’s romantic pursuits; his professional incompetence in allowing prisoners to escape; and, his unorthodox approach to police work, among other things. Andy, however, usually covers for Barney’s foibles, even making Barney appear competent, which Barney realizes.

== Appearances ==
He is featured in these episodes of The Andy Griffith Show:

=== Season 1 ===
- Episode 1: "The New Housekeeper"
- Episode 2: "The Manhunt"
- Episode 3: "The Guitar Player"
- Episode 4: "Ellie Comes to Town"
- Episode 5: "Irresistible Andy"
- Episode 6: "Runaway Kid"
- Episode 7: "Andy the Matchmaker"
- Episode 10: "Ellie for Council"
- Episode 11: "Christmas Story"
- Episode 12: "Stranger in Town"
- Episode 13: "Mayberry Goes Hollywood"
- Episode 14: "The Horse Trader"
- Episode 15: "Those Gossipin' Men"
- Episode 17: "Alcohol and Old Lace"
- Episode 18: "Andy the Marriage Counselor"
- Episode 19: "Mayberry on Record"
- Episode 20: "Andy Saves Barney's Morale"
- Episode 21: "Andy and the Gentleman Crook"
- Episode 22: "Cyrano Andy"
- Episode 24: "The New Doctor"
- Episode 25: "A Plaque for Mayberry"
- Episode 26: "The Inspector"
- Episode 27: "Ellie Saves a Female"
- Episode 28: "Andy Forecloses"
- Episode 29: "Quiet Sam"
- Episode 30: "Barney Gets His Man"
- Episode 31: "The Guitar Player Returns"
- Episode 32: "Bringing Up Opie"

=== Season 2 ===
- Episode 1: "Opie and the Bully"
- Episode 2: "Barney's Replacement"
- Episode 3: "Andy and the Woman Speeder"
- Episode 5: "Barney on the Rebound"
- Episode 6: "Opie's Hobo Friend"
- Episode 7: "Crime-Free Mayberry"
- Episode 8: "The Perfect Female"
- Episode 10: "The Clubmen"
- Episode 11: "The Pickle Story"
- Episode 12: "Sheriff Barney"
- Episode 13: "The Farmer Takes a Wife"
- Episode 14: "Keeper of the Flame"
- Episode 15: "Bailey's Bad Boy"
- Episode 16: "The Manicurist"
- Episode 17: "The Jinx"
- Episode 18: "Jailbreak"
- Episode 19: "A Medal for Opie"
- Episode 20: "Barney and the Choir"
- Episode 21: "Guest of Honor"
- Episode 22: "The Merchant of Mayberry"
- Episode 23: "Aunt Bee the Warden"
- Episode 24: "The County Nurse"
- Episode 25: "Andy and Barney in the Big City"
- Episode 27: "Three's a Crowd"
- Episode 28: "The Bookie Barber"
- Episode 29: "Andy on Trial"
- Episode 30: "Cousin Virgil"
- Episode 31: "Deputy Otis"

=== Season 3 ===
- Episode 1: "Mr. McBeevee"
- Episode 2: "Andy's Rich Girlfriend"
- Episode 3: "Andy and the New Mayor"
- Episode 5: "The Cow Thief"
- Episode 6: "Barney Mends a Broken Heart"
- Episode 7: "Lawman Barney"
- Episode 8: "The Mayberry Band"
- Episode 11: "Convicts-at-Large"
- Episode 13: "The Bank Job"
- Episode 14: "One-Punch Opie"
- Episode 15: "Barney and the Governor"
- Episode 16: "Man in a Hurry"
- Episode 17: "High Noon in Mayberry"
- Episode 18: "The Loaded Goat"
- Episode 19: "Class Reunion"
- Episode 20: "Rafe Hollister Sings"
- Episode 21: "Opie and the Spoiled Kid"
- Episode 22: "The Great Filling Station Robbery"
- Episode 23: "Andy Discovers America"
- Episode 24: "Aunt Bee's Medicine Man"
- Episode 26: "Andy's English Valet"
- Episode 27: "Barney's First Car"
- Episode 28: "The Rivals"
- Episode 29: "A Wife for Andy"
- Episode 30: "Dogs, Dogs, Dogs"
- Episode 31: "Mountain Wedding"
- Episode 32: "The Big House"

=== Season 4 ===
- Episode 1: "Opie the Birdman"
- Episode 2: "The Haunted House"
- Episode 3: "Ernest T. Bass Joins the Army"
- Episode 4: "The Sermon for Today"
- Episode 7: "A Black Day for Mayberry"
- Episode 8: "Opie's Ill-Gotten Gain"
- Episode 9: "A Date for Gomer"
- Episode 10: "Up in Barney's Room"
- Episode 11: "Citizen's Arrest"
- Episode 12: "Opie and His Merry Men"
- Episode 13: "Barney and the Cave Rescue"
- Episode 14: "Andy and Opie's Pal"
- Episode 15: "Aunt Bee the Crusader"
- Episode 16: "Barney's Sidecar"
- Episode 17: "My Fair Ernest T. Bass"
- Episode 18: "Prisoner of Love"
- Episode 19: "Hot Rod Otis"
- Episode 20: "The Song Festers"
- Episode 21: "The Shoplifters"
- Episode 22: "Andy's Vacation"
- Episode 25: "Divorce, Mountain Style"
- Episode 26: "A Deal is a Deal"
- Episode 27: "Fun Girls"
- Episode 28: "The Return of Malcolm Merriweather"
- Episode 29: "The Rumor"
- Episode 30: "Barney and Thelma Lou, Phfftt"
- Episode 31: "Back to Nature"

=== Season 5 ===
- Episode 1: "Opie Loves Helen"
- Episode 2: "Barney's Physical"
- Episode 4: "The Education of Ernest T. Bass"
- Episode 6: "Barney's Bloodhound"
- Episode 7: "Man in the Middle"
- Episode 8: "Barney's Uniform"
- Episode 9: "Opie's Fortune"
- Episode 10: "Goodbye, Sheriff Taylor"
- Episode 11: "The Pageant"
- Episode 12: "The Darling Baby"
- Episode 13: "Andy and Helen Have Their Day"
- Episode 14: "Three Wishes for Opie"
- Episode 15: "Otis Sues the County"
- Episode 16: "Barney Fife, Realtor"
- Episode 18: "The Rehabilitation of Otis"
- Episode 19: "The Lucky Letter"
- Episode 20: "Goober and the Art of Love"
- Episode 21: "Barney Runs for Sheriff"
- Episode 22: "If I Had a Quarter-Million Dollars"
- Episode 23: "TV or Not TV"
- Episode 25: "The Case of the Punch in the Nose"
- Episode 26: "Opie's Newspaper"
- Episode 27: "Aunt Bee's Invisible Beau"
- Episode 28: "The Arrest of the Fun Girls"
- Episode 29: "The Luck of Newton Monroe"
- Episode 30: "Opie Flunks Arithmetic"

=== Season 6 ===
- Episode 17: "The Return of Barney Fife"
- Episode 18: "The Legend of Barney Fife"

=== Season 7 ===
- Episode 18: "A Visit to Barney Fife"
- Episode 19: "Barney Comes to Mayberry"

=== Season 8 ===
- Episode 21: "Barney Hosts a Summit Meeting"

== Legacy ==
Calling a police officer or authority figure "Barney Fife" has become an American slang term for gross ineptitude or overzealousness. A notable example occurred during the Scott Peterson case, in which the defendant's mother referred to the local police captain as "Barney Fife".

During oral arguments for the US Supreme Court case Herring v. United States regarding evidence exclusion by negligent law enforcement, Stanford law professor Pamela Karlan told the court, "There's not a Barney Fife defense to the violation of the Fourth Amendment."

== In popular culture ==
At least two cartoons pay homage to Barney Fife: In The New Scooby-Doo Movies, Don Knotts guest stars as himself to help solve the mystery, but wearing Barney Fife's uniform as deputy of "Juneberry." In Freakazoid "Toby Danger" when a out of control giant robot is destroying Las Vegas, Nevada, there is a cameo of a Barney Fife deputy sheriff in a crowd.

In The Sopranos season 6, episode 15, Paulie Gualtieri tells Tony Soprano a story about getting pulled over in the 1960s by a state trooper while driving Tony's father's Cadillac automobile without a driver's license. Mr. Soprano, Sr. tells the young Paulie to smooth things over by telling the trooper he has a cousin who is a trooper named Barney Fife. He gets punched in the head by the trooper for his troubles, and Mr. Soprano has to bribe the trooper $100 (said to be an average month's wage at the time) to avoid charges.

Barney Fife was a main inspiration for the security guard NPCs in Valve Software’s 1998 video game Half-Life, as well as the character of Barney Calhoun beginning with Gearbox Software’s 2001 expansion pack Half-Life: Blue Shift. In early alpha builds of Half-Life, the nervous expression on the face texture used for the guards (referred to as “Barneys” in the game files) was modeled after actor Don Knotts.

== Accolades ==
Knotts' portrayal of Barney Fife earned him five Primetime Emmy Awards for Outstanding Supporting Actor in a Comedy Series, the most in that category.
