= Aaron Ruben =

American television director and producer (1914–2010)

- Publicity Photo of Aaron Ruben
- Born: Aaron J. Ruben; March 1, 1914; Chicago, Illinois, U.S.
- Died: January 30, 2010 (aged 95); Beverly Hills, California, U.S.
- Occupations: Director, producer, writer
- Years active: 1952–1996
- Spouses: Sandy C. Rothblatt (m. 1943; div. 1971); Maureen Arthur (m. 1971)
- Children: 2

Aaron Ruben (March 1, 1914 – January 30, 2010) was an American television director and producer known for The Andy Griffith Show (1960), Gomer Pyle, U.S.M.C. (1964), and Sanford and Son (1972).

== Early life ==
Ruben was born in Chicago, Illinois, the son of Polish Jewish immigrants. He grew up on the West Side of Chicago and attended Lewis Institute but did not graduate. He was involved in theater in Chicago after leaving college. After service in the military he worked for studios and wrote for radio programs including those of Dinah Shore, George Burns and Gracie Allen, and Fred Allen. He co-wrote Milton Berle's 1947-48 radio series with Nat Hiken.

== Television career ==
Ruben started his TV producing and directing career in 1954 when he directed the TV series Caesar's Hour (1954). He then directed eleven episodes of The Phil Silvers Show between 1957 and 1959, along with Silvers' CBS TV special, Keep in Step (1959). He later produced The Andy Griffith Show (1960), working on that series for five seasons as producer, writer and story consultant.

He went on to create the Andy Griffith spin-off Gomer Pyle, U.S.M.C. (1964). Other credits include Headmaster (1970), Sanford and Son (1972), C.P.O. Sharkey (1976) and Teachers Only (1982).

In 2003, Ruben won the Writers Guild of America, West's Valentine Davies Award for public service, for his work on behalf of abused children.

== Film ==
Ruben co-wrote and co-produced (with Carl Reiner) a 1969 film about the silent-movie era, The Comic, starring Dick Van Dyke.

== Death ==
Ruben was married to actress Maureen Arthur. He died from pneumonia on January 30, 2010, at his home in Beverly Hills, California, aged 95.

== Primetime Emmy Award nominations ==
- Outstanding New Series: Sanford and Son - shared with Bud Yorkin, 1972
- Outstanding Series - Comedy: Sanford and Son - shared with Bud Yorkin, 1972
- Outstanding Comedy Series: Sanford and Son - shared with Bud Yorkin, 1973
