= Mayberry R.F.D. =

American TV sitcom (1968–1971)

- Created by: Bob Ross
- Starring: Ken Berry; Frances Bavier; George Lindsey; Buddy Foster
- Theme music composer: Earle Hagen
- Opening theme: "Mayberry March"
- Composers: Earle Hagen; Pete Carpenter; Carl Brandt
- Country of origin: United States
- No. of seasons: 3
- No. of episodes: 78 (list of episodes)

Production
- Executive producers: Andy Griffith; Richard O. Linke
- Producers: Bob Ross; Bob Mosher; Charles Stewart
- Running time: 24 minutes
- Production company: R.F.D. Productions

Original release
- Network: CBS
- Release: September 23, 1968 – March 29, 1971

Related
- The Andy Griffith Show

Mayberry R.F.D. (abbreviation for Rural Free Delivery) is an American television series produced as a spin-off continuation of The Andy Griffith Show. When star Andy Griffith decided to leave the series, most of the supporting characters returned for the retitled program, which ran for three seasons (78 episodes) on the CBS Television Network from 1968 to 1971.

During the eighth and final season of The Andy Griffith Show, widower farmer Sam Jones (Ken Berry) and his young son Mike (Buddy Foster) are introduced and gradually become the show's focus. Sheriff Andy Taylor's role slowly diminishes, establishing the new premise. Sheriff Taylor and newlywed wife Helen made guest appearances on Mayberry R.F.D. until late 1969 before they relocated with Opie. Mayberry R.F.D. was popular throughout its entire run but was canceled after its third season in CBS's "rural purge" of 1971.

== Plot and characters ==
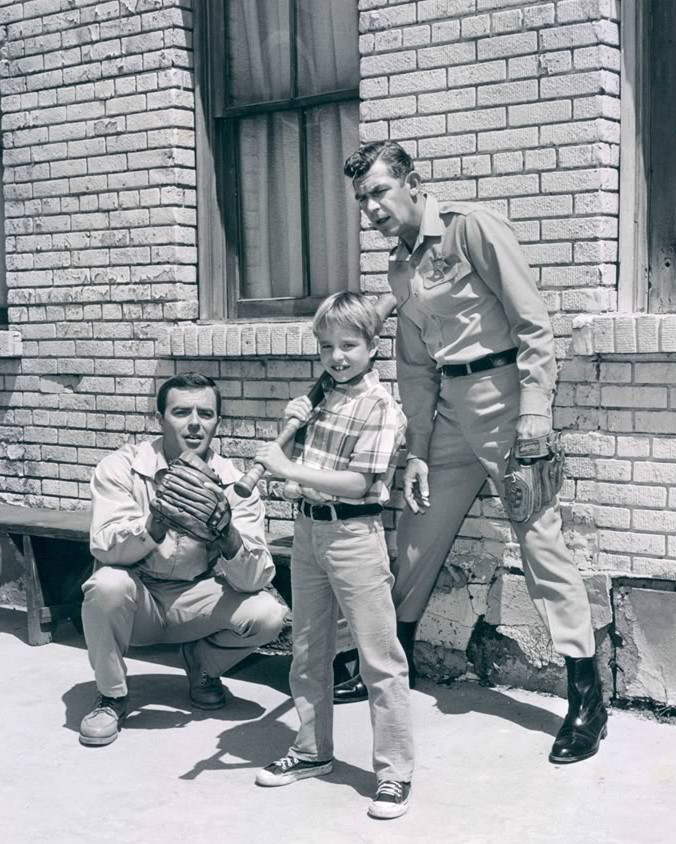
Sam and Andy give Mike a hand with his swing, 1968

The father and son stories involving Sam and Mike Jones are reminiscent of the episodes that starred Andy Griffith. Both characters are introduced in the last season of The Andy Griffith Show (TAGS), beginning with Sam's election as head of the town council. Most of the town folk from TAGS continued their roles. Loyal Mayberry citizens Goober Pyle (George Lindsey), Clara Edwards (Hope Summers), Emmett Clark (Paul Hartman) and Howard Sprague (Jack Dodson) are seen regularly.

Sheriff Andy Taylor and his sweetheart, Helen Crump (Aneta Corsaut), marry in the new title's first episode. Both Andy and Helen make additional appearances during the first season (mostly Andy, who remains Sheriff of Mayberry in the early appearances.) Griffith and Coursaut leave the series for good in late 1969. The series explains that the two had moved to Charlotte, North Carolina. Aunt Bee (Frances Bavier) becomes Sam's housekeeper but leaves after the second season to be replaced by Sam's cousin, Alice Cooper (Alice Ghostley).

Don Knotts as Barney Fife and Ronny Howard as Opie Taylor both appear in the first episode, with Barney serving as Andy's best man for the wedding. Actress Arlene Golonka (who played Howard Sprague's sweetheart Millie Hutchins/Swanson in the Griffith show) becomes Sam's love interest in the retitled seasons.

A recurring African American character named Ralph (Charles Lampkin) lives with a teen daughter and pre-teen son next to the Jones farm. Mary Lansing appeared occasionally as Emmett's wife, Martha. As with its predecessor, Mayberry R.F.D. continued under the sponsorship of General Foods and its products.

== Notable guest stars ==
- Farrah Fawcett played a showgirl in "Millie the Model" (October 20, 1969)
- Jodie Foster, sister of regular cast member Buddy Foster, played a fairy in "The Church Play" (November 18, 1968) and a little girl in "All for Charity" (October 12, 1970)
- Teri Garr (credited as "Terri Garr") played a cashier in "Miss Farmerette" (December 23, 1968)
- Will Geer played Captain Wolford in "Aunt Bee's Cruise" (part one on January 13, 1969; part two on January 20, 1969)
- Natalie Schafer played Cornelia Willoughby in "Goober the Housekeeper" (November 9, 1970)

An NBC reunion movie, Return to Mayberry, was produced in 1986 and featured many original performers from The Andy Griffith Show. Ken Berry, Buddy Foster and Arlene Golonka did not appear, nor did The Andy Griffith Show regulars Frances Bavier, Elinor Donahue, and Jack Burns. Nevertheless, Return does share continuity with the R.F.D. storyline, by maintaining that Andy and Helen are married. However, Andy and Helen's son, Andy Jr., is never mentioned.

== Episodes ==
Season	Episodes	Originally released		Rank	Rating
Season	Episodes	First released	Last released	Rank	Rating
Pilot	1	April 1, 1968		—N/a	—N/a
1	26	September 23, 1968	May 12, 1969	4	25.4
2	26	September 22, 1969	April 13, 1970	4	24.4
3	26	September 14, 1970	March 29, 1971	15	22.3

== Home media ==
In 1983, the distribution rights to Mayberry R.F.D. were acquired by Telepictures Corporation through its Perennial division, which was later acquired by Lorimar Productions, which was in turn acquired by Warner Bros. and merged into Warner Bros. Television Distribution.

On April 8, 2014, Warner Home Video released the first season on DVD in Region 1. It was re-released as a manufacture-on-demand (MOD) DVD via the Warner Archive Collection label on February 27, 2018.

The complete series was released on DVD on June 13, 2023.

== Reception and ratings ==
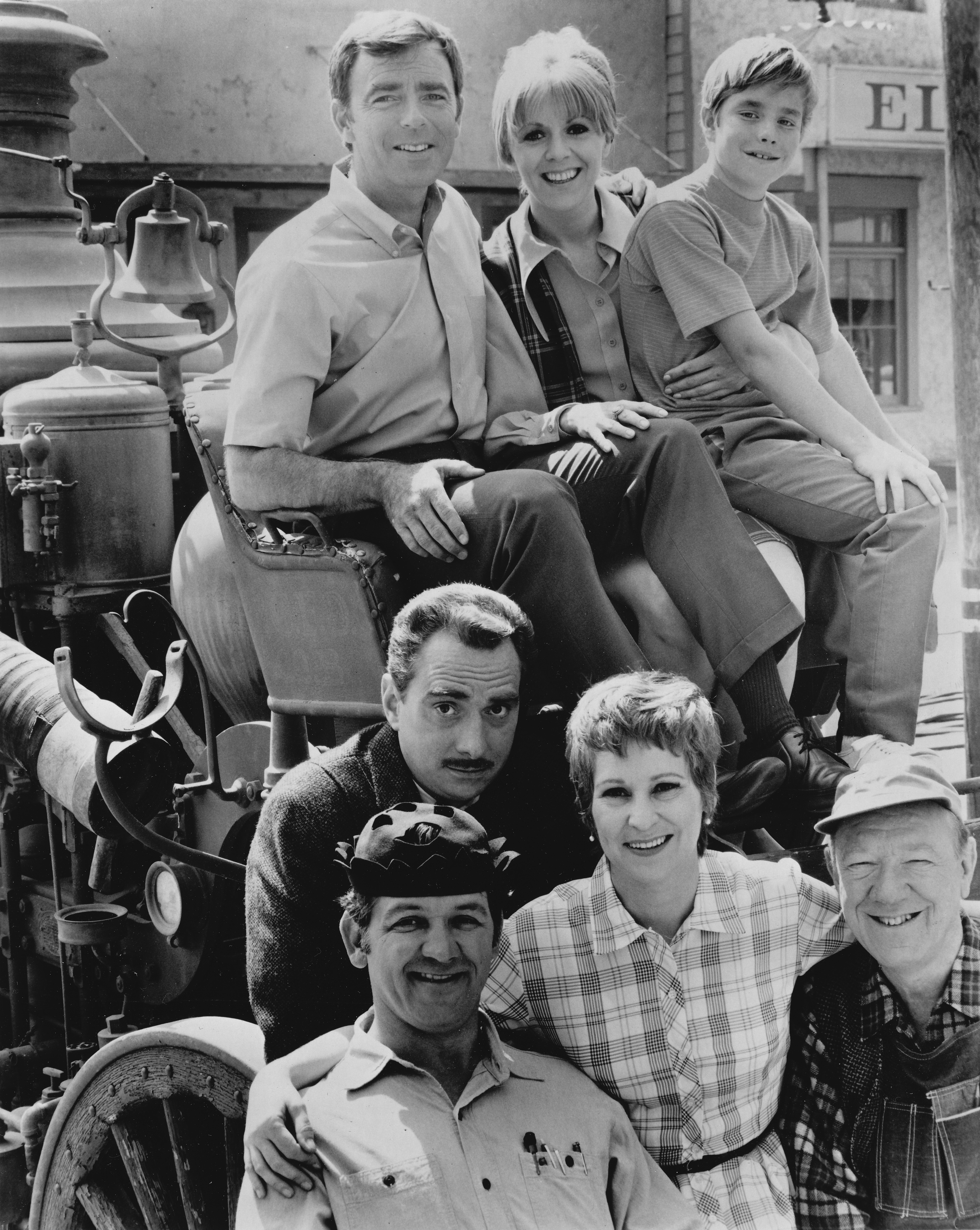
The cast of the third and final season of Mayberry R.F.D., 1970. Back row, L-R: Ken Berry, Arlene Golonka, Buddy Foster. Front: George Lindsey (in hat), Jack Dodson, Alice Ghostley and Paul Hartman

The final episode of The Andy Griffith Show was titled "Mayberry R.F.D." and added an Italian-American family to the Sam Jones homestead. The producers chose to forgo a big overhaul and instead stuck with the winning premise of a widower, his son and the matronly Aunt Bee. Therefore, the series was much the same as The Andy Griffith Show, without Andy Taylor and son Opie.

Mayberry R.F.D. was consistently in the top ten in the Nielsen ratings the first two years of its run, but dropped to number 15 during its third and final season. That year CBS, seeking a more urban image, canceled all its rural-themed shows including Green Acres, Hee Haw and The Beverly Hillbillies in what became known as the "rural purge".

== Bibliography ==
- Fernandes, David; & Dale Robinson. A Guide to Television's "Mayberry R.F.D.", McFarland & Company, Inc, 1999. ISBN 978-0-7864-7284-0
