= Frank Inn =

American animal trainer (1916–2002)

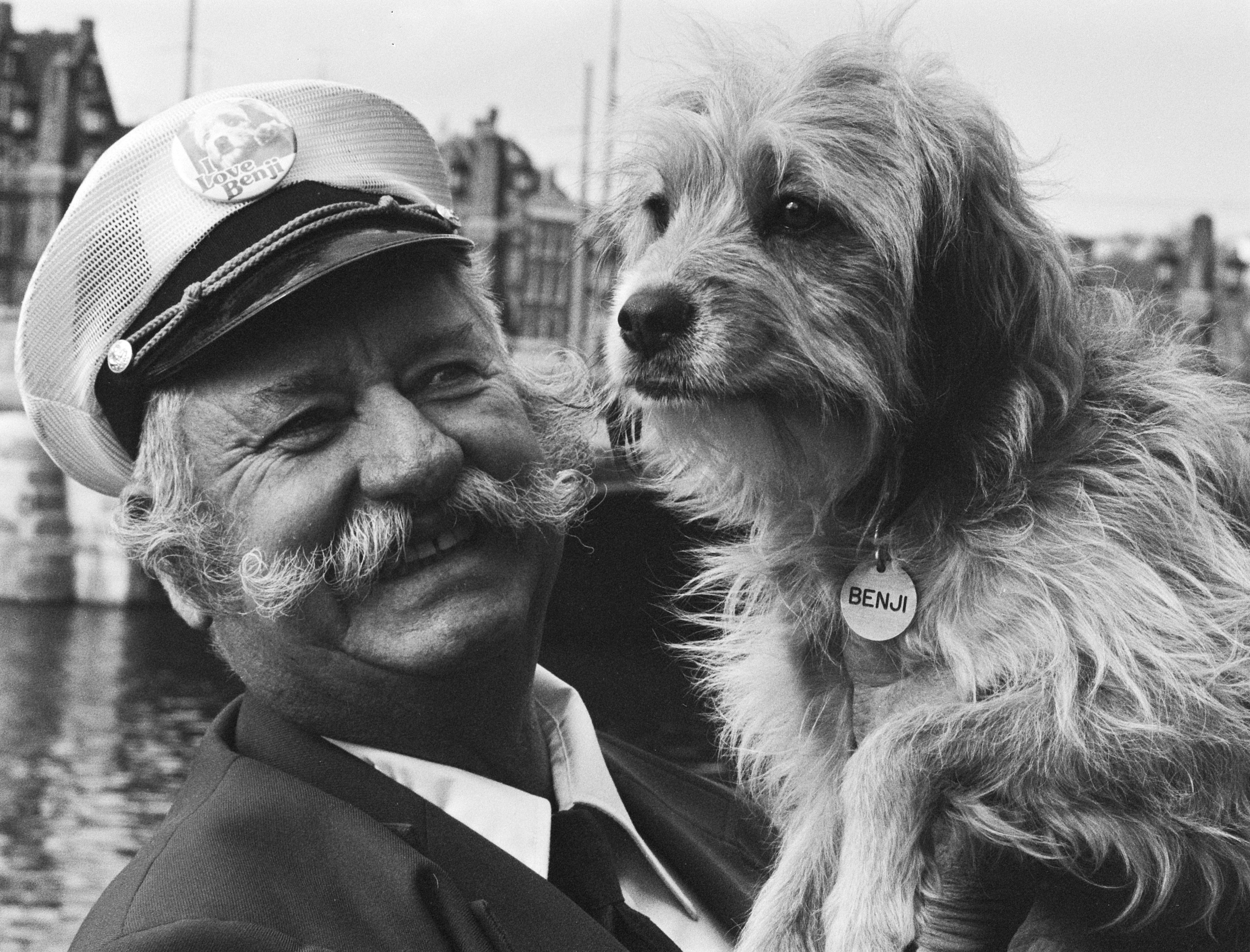
- Inn and Benji (Benjean) in the Netherlands in 1979
- Born: Elias Franklin Freeman; May 8, 1916; Camby, Indiana, US
- Died: July 27, 2002 (aged 86); Saugus, California, US
- Occupation: Animal trainer
- Spouse: Juanita Heard
- Children: 3

Frank Inn, born Elias Franklin Freeman (May 8, 1916 – July 27, 2002), was an American animal trainer. He trained several animals for television programs and movies, including the dogs in the Benji series and the cat Orangey. He also trained the dog in Honey, I Shrunk the Kids.

== Personal life ==
Elias Franklin Freeman was born in Camby, Indiana, to a Quaker family. He left home at age 17, changed his name to Frank Inn, and sought his fortune in Hollywood. He learned to train animals while recovering from a serious car accident in Culver City, California.

Inn was married to the former Juanita Heard for 50 years, from 1946 until her death in 1996. They had three children. After Juanita's death, Inn retired and devoted his time to writing poetry, assembling a museum of memorabilia from his long career, and training a new generation of animal wranglers.

Inn died on July 27, 2002, at the age of 86 after a brief illness. He kept the ashes of many of his beloved animals after they had died, and it was his wish to have these buried with him at Forest Lawn Memorial Park (Hollywood Hills). He had a special coffin made to accommodate the animal urns.

== Career ==
Inn's career as an animal trainer spanned more than 50 years. His first professional work was as an assistant trainer of Skippy, the dog who played Asta in the Thin Man movie series.

In 1943, he assisted Rudd Weatherwax in the training of Pal, the dog who originated the movie role of Lassie.

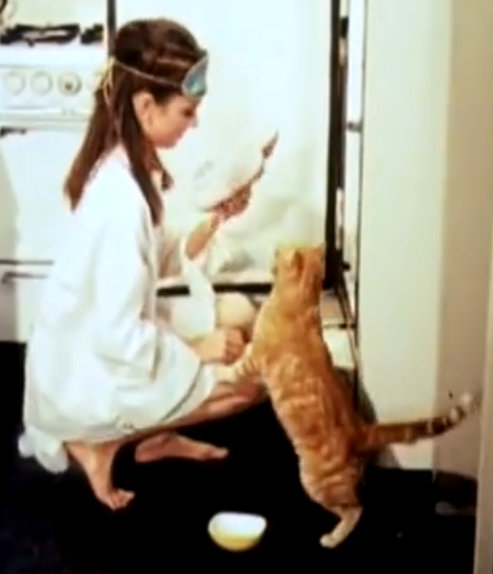
Orangey with Audrey Hepburn in Breakfast at Tiffany's (1961)

In the early 1950s, Inn left the Weatherwax animal training organization and began to work as an independent trainer. His animal stars included Orangey, a cat who was in the films Rhubarb (1952), The Incredible Shrinking Man (1957), The Diary of Anne Frank (1959), and Breakfast at Tiffany's (1961), and appeared in the television series Our Miss Brooks with Eve Arden, and in Batman as a cat belonging to Eartha Kitt's villain Catwoman; Cleo, a Basset Hound who was in the film Bell, Book and Candle (1957) and in Jackie Cooper's 1950s television show, The People's Choice; Arnold Ziffel, the pig from Green Acres; the chimps from Lancelot Link, Secret Chimp, the dog and two cats from The Secret Lives of Waldo Kitty, Tramp the dog of My Three Sons and many of Elly May Clampett's exotic "critters" on The Beverly Hillbillies. He and Juanita additionally trained a captive male African lion for particular episodes of The Addams Family.

Possibly his most famous animal was Higgins, a fluffy brown mutt he rescued from an animal shelter in Burbank, California. The dog, which Inn believed to be a cross between a Miniature Poodle, a Cocker Spaniel, and a small terrier (either a Miniature Schnauzer or a Border Terrier), starred in Petticoat Junction in the 1960s, and in the feature films Mooch Goes to Hollywood (1971) and Benji (1974). A sequel, For the Love of Benji (1977), starred Higgins's daughter Benjean, also trained by Inn. Benjean portrayed the title role in the following three Benji movies.

In addition to his assistant trainers Gerry Warshauer and Karl Miller, Juanita Inn also helped Frank with animal training; she was listed in the opening credits of Benji and given credit as an animal trainer in Oh! Heavenly Dog, a 1980 movie starring Benjean.

Frank Inn also took on small character roles in films that featured his trained animals. He portrayed a studio security guard (uncredited) in Mooch Goes to Hollywood in 1971, appeared as himself in Benji the Hunted in 1987, and played a cook in the 1976 camel comedy Hawmps!. He can also be seen working as Benjean's trainer in the 1980 documentary Benji at Work, and the voice of Juanita Inn can be heard calling Benjean from off-camera during the behind-the-scenes description of a complex multi-part stunt that required the dog to approach a building, try to enter, and then run away as if driven off.

A true animal lover, Inn could not bear to see healthy animals euthanized, so he took them in. Those with acting ability he and his assistants kept and trained; the others he gave to friends and admirers as pets. Inn said that at one time he and his helpers had one thousand animals under their care, and the feeding bills alone came to $400 per day.

== Honors ==
The International Association of Canine Professionals honored Frank Inn as their first inductee into the IACP Hall of Fame.

The Patsy Award (Picture Animal Top Star of the Year) was originated by the Hollywood office of the American Humane Association in 1939 to honor animal performers in four categories: canine, equine, wild and special. During his career, Inn's animals won 40 Patsy Awards, two of them multiple times: Orangey the cat won twice, for Rhubarb and Breakfast at Tiffany's; and Arnold the Pig won for three successive years on Green Acres from 1966 to 1968.

== Filmography ==
Year	Title	Role	Notes
1959	Laffing Time	Animal trainer	
1976	Hawmps!	Cook	(final film role)
1987	Benji the Hunted	Himself	
