= The Double McGuffin =

1979 American mystery film

- Theatrical release poster by Saul Bass
- Directed by: Joe Camp
- Written by: Joe Camp (screenplay, story); Richard Baker (story)
- Produced by: Joe Camp
- Starring: Ernest Borgnine; George Kennedy; Elke Sommer; Lisa Whelchel; Dion Pride; Greg Hodges
- Cinematography: Don Reddy
- Edited by: Steve R. Moore; Leon Seith
- Music by: Euel Box
- Production company: Mulberry Square Productions
- Distributed by: Paramount Pictures; Mulberry Square Releasing; American Broadcasting Company (ABC); Best Film & Video Corp.
- Release date: June 1, 1979
- Running time: 101 minutes
- Country: United States
- Language: English
- Budget: more than $3 million

The Double McGuffin is a 1979 American mystery film written and directed by Joe Camp. The film stars Ernest Borgnine and George Kennedy.

Elke Sommer and NFL stars Ed "Too Tall" Jones and Lyle Alzado also appear, as do Vincent Spano and Dion Pride (son of country singer Charley Pride). An opening narration is provided by Orson Welles.

== Film title ==
At the beginning of the film, the narrator, Orson Welles, informs the audience that a McGuffin is an object that serves as the focal point of a plot and this film has two.

== Plot ==
At a train station, a mercenary orders a car driver to deliver a briefcase to the St. Moritz hotel, to which it eventually falls into the woods on its way. Meanwhile, a sniper prepares to assassinate a woman at the hotel, but fails.

The following night, a group of boarding school boys named Specks, Homer, Billy Ray and Foster sneak out of their dorm to swim in a pond near the woods. At one point, they encounter the same woman who nearly got assassinated dropping her daughter off at school in her limousine. The four boys arrive at the pond and swim in it, but their time is cut short by police chief Arnold Talasek, who is constantly irritated by the boys' antics. Talasek threatens to report the boys to their football coach and have them removed from game tomorrow night. Specks convinces him to let them play, and he relents before taking them back to their dorm.

The next morning, Homer invites a girl named Jody into the woods to chat with her, where he confesses his love for her, to which she replies that she should take geometry lessons instead. After parting ways, Homer discovers the briefcase and finds a huge stash of money inside. Homer quickly hides the briefcase in a culvert and heads off to inform his friends. They return to the site, only to find a man's corpse instead. The boys report the corpse to Talasek, but he refuses to believe them, due to their past misbehavior. The boys eventually convince Talasek to investigate the crime scene, only to discover that the body has disappeared.

Later, the boys and Jody find the briefcase in the possession of a man named Mr. Firat at a phone booth after being dropped off by the woman's limousine. Specks and Jody distract Firat by conducting a survey, while Homer and Foster steal the briefcase and bring it to Talasek. However, Firat arrives at the scene, and Talasek refuses to open the briefcase. Firat reluctantly agrees to have the briefcase opened, only to find underwear instead of the money. After spotting Firat and the woman from the limousine watching the boys attending the football game the following night, Specks and Homer sneak into the woods and find the briefcase in the same culvert, along with a severed hand. The two boys initially flee the scene, but they decide to return to recover the briefcase and bring it to Talasek, only to find it gone.

The next morning, Billy Ray follows Firat to Hotel Bonnieux and finds him talking to the mercenaries at a bar. The other boys arrive, and Billy Ray takes Homer with him to investigate Firat's room, while Specks and Foster keep watch. Billy Ray conceals a transceiver in a nearby plant, and Homer discovers a stack of firearms in a trunk. When Billy Ray finds out that the phone has been left off the hook, the boys immediately leave the room before Firat and his men can catch them. The boys discover Firat's murder plot over the transceiver, but one of the assassins pours alcohol onto the concealed transceiver before they can overhear more details of their plan.

After finding out that the assassins are arranging a homecoming banquet, the boys hire Jody and a computer student named Arthur Honeycutt (whom Homer has a feud with) to assist them in their efforts to stop the murder plot. Foster distracts the assassins by setting off a fire alarm, and Jody manages to take pictures of the men. The next night, the boys sneak into the police station to print out the criminal records of the assassins. The students discover that Firat is an illegal immigrant from Kaboor, a former dictatorship in the Middle East. After hours of circling information, the students stumble upon a section with the name Michelle Carter, who is the daughter of the woman from the limousine. The students call the government of Kaboor and learn that the prime minister is the woman from the limousine named Madame Kura, which leads them to realize that Firat wants to assassinate Kura to dismantle Kaboor's democracy and restore the dictatorship.

At morning, Billy Ray and Arthur head to Carter's school and try to convince Kura to head with them to the police station to learn about the assassination plot, but Firat appears in her limousine and the boys flee. A chase ensues until the boys run out of breath and are forced to dump out the files to give them time to escape. Arthur blames himself for their failure until Specks suggests that they bring the police to the evidence. The boys distract the assassins with another fire alarm, and Specks and Homer sneak into Firat's room, while Arthur convinces Talasek to head with him to the hotel. Arthur and Talasek arrive at Firat's room and investigate the trunk filled with firearms, only to find it empty. Talasek confronts Arthur and accuses him of duping him until the phone rings. After picking up the phone, Talasek arrests the assassins after Specks tricks him into thinking that Firat kidnapped him and Homer. The students celebrate their victory, and Specks hands the files containing the evidence to Talasek. Talasek begins to trust the students more, and they part ways.

== Cast ==
- Dion Pride as Specks
- Greg Hodges as Homer Rutledge
- Jeff Nicholson as Billy Ray Dober
- Vincent Spano as Foster Hathaway
- Lisa Whelchel as Jody
- Michael Gerard as Arthur Honeycutt
- Elke Sommer as Madame Kura
- Lori Lively as Michelle Carter
- George Kennedy as Chief Arnold Talasek
- Ernest Borgnine as Mr. Sharif Firat
- Garvin Edwards as Football Player
- Anne Reilly as Cocktail Waitress
- Ed "Too Tall" Jones as Assassin #1
- Lyle Alzado as Assassin #2
- Rod Browning as Moras (Assassin #3)
- Mike Davis as Newlywed #1
- Peggy Davis as Newlywed #2
- Kit Lyons as Computer Programmer
- George Bailey as Night Watchman
- Ben Mayo as Taxi Driver
- Cyrus Newitt as Police Officer
- Daniel G. Albright as Policeman At Nightdesk
- Joe Camp as Newsstand Operator
- Don Reddy as Newsstand Customer
- Jeffrey Johnson as Hotel Desk Clerk
- Nanci Newman as Reporter
- Verne Lundquist as Radio Announcer
- Orson Welles as Narrator
- Frank Inn as Himself
- Benjean as Benji

== Production ==
Joe Camp had a huge financial success with the film Benji, which made over $30 million on a budget of $545,000. In 1975 he announced he wanted to make The Double McGuffin as his second feature. The following year he said he would make it after Hawmps! (1976) and For the Love of Benji (1977). Camp called it a "combination of Hitchcock, The Sting and Mission Impossible set in a boarding school." Dion Pride is the son of country singer Charley Pride.

The film was shot in Charleston SC, Savannah GA and Rome GA in January 1978.
