= Benji's Very Own Christmas Story =

- DVD cover
- Written by: Joe Camp; Dan Witt
- Directed by: Joe Camp
- Starring: Benjean; Ron Moody; Patsy Garrett; Cynthia Smith
- Music by: Euel Box
- Country of origin: United States
- Original language: English

Production
- Producer: Joe Camp
- Cinematography: Don Reddy
- Editor: Leon Seith
- Running time: 25 minutes
- Production company: Mulberry Square Productions

Original release
- Network: ABC
- Release: December 7, 1978

Benji's Very Own Christmas Story is a 1978 American Christmas television special featuring Benji and is one of two such Benji specials to have been nominated for an Emmy Award. Patsy Garrett and Cynthia Smith reprise their respective roles as Mary and Cindy. The special was broadcast on ABC on December 7, 1978.

== Plot ==
Mary and Cindy from the Benji films are on a promotional tour in Switzerland and are asked to be grand marshalls of a Christmas parade in Zermatt. Due to a broken leg, Kris Kringle is sending his elves out to deliver presents, and, as this will force them to miss the parade, he wants them to meet Benji first. With help from Mary and Cindy, Kringle realizes the true meaning of Christmas and performs a musical number showing how Saint Nicholas appears all over the world.

== Cast ==
- Benjean as Benji (daughter of original Benji, Higgins)
- Patsy Garrett as Mary
- Cynthia Smith as Cindy Chapman
- Ron Moody as Kris Kringle

== Crew ==
The show was directed by Joe Camp.

== Nominations and awards ==
Benji's Very Own Christmas Story was nominated for an Emmy Award in 1979 for Outstanding Children's Program.

Actress Cynthia Smith was nominated for a Youth in Film Award (now known as the Young Artist Award) in 1979 for her performance. The film was also nominated in the category of Best TV Series or Special Featuring Youth.

== See also ==
- List of Christmas films
- Santa Claus in film
