= Benji: Off the Leash! =

- Theatrical release poster
- Directed by: Joe Camp
- Written by: Joe Camp
- Produced by: Joe Camp
- Starring: Benji; Nick Whitaker; Shaggy; Gypsy the Cockatoo
- Cinematography: Don Reddy
- Edited by: Dava Whisenant
- Music by: Antonio di Lorenzo
- Production company: Mulberry Square Productions
- Distributed by: Mulberry Square Productions
- Release dates: March 26, 2004 (premiere); August 20, 2004 (USA); August 21, 2012 (United Kingdom); November 21, 2012 (Egypt); December 20, 2015 (Turkey)
- Running time: 100 minutes
- Country: United States
- Language: English
- Box office: $3,817,362

Benji: Off the Leash! (also known during development as Benji Returns: The Promise of Christmas, and later Benji Returns: Rags to Riches) is a 2004 American comedy-drama film directed, written, and produced by Joe Camp. It stars Nick Whitaker, Chris Kendrick, Christy Summerhays, Randall Newsome, Duane Stephens, and animal actors. It is the fifth film in the Benji series, and the last Benji film that Joe Camp has directed, produced, and written, until his death in 2024.

== Plot ==
The film starts with the understanding that the makers of the Benji films are going to various towns in the U.S. looking for the next dog to play Benji. In a small Mississippi town, a freelance, abusive dog breeder named Hatchett keeps a backyard kennel under poor conditions behind his home. He lives with a young boy named Colby and his mother and is verbally and physically abusive to them, but Colby loves dogs and secretly nurtures a female black dog, Daisy, who is Hatchett's top breeder. He goes to an abandoned house in the neighborhood and takes food and water to the black dog so she can produce milk for her new pups. Hatchett learns of this and accuses Colby of stealing his most prized breeder, then orders Colby to take the black puppies, but abandons a fluffy, light-colored mongrel. Over several months, Colby secretly cares for the puppy, and he grows into the unnamed fluffy dog that will become Benji.

Meanwhile, two Animal Control officers named Livingston and Sheldon attempt to investigate Hatchett for his illegal breeding activities and reports of animal abuse by snooping outside his property. They come across a shaggy dog that is impossible to catch and dub him "Lizard Tongue" due to his long tongue. He seemingly taunts them by following them everywhere they go.

One day, the fluffy dog (Benji) wanders off to the front door of a local elderly man, Zachariah Finch, and eats a portion of meat inside a grocery bag that was left by a delivery boy on his front porch. Zachariah discovers the deed afterwards, and decides to leave out the unfinished portion to his mysterious guest. This became the norm and fluffy dog and Lizard Tongue would come at night to eat the food that Zachariah had left out. Seeing that Lizard Tongue needed a home, fluffy dog intervenes and orchestrates for Zachariah to discover that Lizard Tongue was the mysterious animal visiting him each night. Having already being attached to him, the old man takes the dog into his home.

When the fluffy dog sees that her mother is sick back at the kennel, he opens her cage and helps her escape. He brings her back to the abandoned house but when she became too sick to even eat, he gets Lizard Tongue to help him draw the animal control officers to the abandoned house. At the shelter, a veterinarian determines she is dying from over-breeding and poor care, so the shelter director and the local sheriff authorize the vet to spay the dog and perform life-saving surgery.

Hatchett becomes furious when he learns that his black dog was spayed and threatens to sue. But when he learns that the Benji film producer is in town and wants the fluffy dog to be the new Benji, he intimidates and forces Colby into lying about being the owner. At the shelter, the fluffy dog is reunited with her mother, and Colby tells everyone the truth about the dog. Ozzie also discovers signs of physical abuse on Colby's mother and Mr. Hatchett gets arrested while trying to flee. Colby says that while he loves fluffy dog so much, he wants him to have a better life as the new Benji. He only asks that he be allowed to visit him once in a while, to which the film producer replies that he could visit him anytime he wants. The end credits show various scenes from the film as they were shot and make reference to the origins of the shelter dogs used in the film.

== Cast ==
- Nick Whitaker as Colby, the son of Hatchett and Claire
- Chris Kendrick as Terrance Muncy Hatchett, Colby's abusive father
- Christy Summerhays as Claire, the wife of Hatchett and the mother of Colby
- Neal Barth as Zachariah Finch, a local elderly man
- Randall Newsome as Livingston, an animal control officer
- Duane Stephens as Sheldon, an animal control officer
- Nate Bynum as Sgt. Oswald Lewis
- Melinda Haynes as Animal Shelter Director
- Joey Miyashima as Veterinarian
- Scott Wilkenson as Film Producer
- Jeff Olson as Paul's Market owner
- Moochie (credited as "Benji") as Benji, a white fluffy dog
- Sally Sue as 8-Week-Old Benji
- Odola as 4-Month-Old Benji
- Shaggy as Lizard Tongue, a long-tongued shaggy dog
- Gypsy the Cockatoo as Merlin

== Production ==
Benji: Off the Leash! was originally developed by Camp as a Christmas-themed film titled Benji Returns: The Promise of Christmas. The script was later rewritten to focus on the origin of Benji, with a new subtitle, Rags to Riches. Filming took place over 10 weeks in the Utah cities of Kaysville, Ogden, Payson, and Salt Lake City during the summer of 2003. The film had its world premiere on March 25, 2004, in Jackson, Mississippi, and nationwide premiere on August 20 of that year.

== Reception ==
Benji: Off the Leash! received a score of 33% on Rotten Tomatoes, based on 43 reviews, with an average score of 4.3/10. Roger Ebert gave it three out of four stars, writing "it's not one of the great dog movies, but it's a good one".
