= The Brothers O'Toole =

- 1973 movie poster
- Directed by: Richard Erdman
- Written by: Marion Hargrove
- Screenplay by: Tim Kelly
- Story by: Tim Kelly
- Produced by: Charles E. Sellier Jr.
- Starring: John Astin; Pat Carroll; Hans Conried; Richard Erdman; Allyn Joslyn; Richard Jury; Lee Meriwether; Jesse White; Steve Carlson
- Cinematography: Allen Daviau
- Edited by: Bud Molin
- Music by: Don Piestrup
- Production company: CVD Studios
- Release date: May 16, 1973 (Denver)
- Country: United States
- Language: English

The Brothers O'Toole is a 1973 comedy Western film starring John Astin, Pat Carroll, and Lee Meriwether. The film was Astin's next film after the success of Evil Roy Slade, another comedy Western. It was Charles Sellier's first successful feature film at the beginning his career as a producer, and also cinematographer Allen Daviau's first feature film.

== Synopsis ==
Michael O'Toole (John Astin) is a roguish gambler and con artist running from a town after cheating at poker. His younger brother Timothy O'Toole (Steve Carlson) is a womanizer who romanced Bonnie Lou, the daughter of McClanahan, an angry father armed with a shotgun. The two brothers meet and find their way to a poor, sleepy Colorado mining town called Molybdenum (mispronounced "Molly B'Damn by the citizens), named when a passing geologist informed the town that nothing was left in the mine but worthless molybdenum after the lead had been mined out. The townspeople all owned share certificates from the mine. They regard the certificates as worthless, and have stored them away or used them to paper walls.

Shortly after arriving in Molybdenum, Timothy befriends the family of spinster Callie Burdyne (Pat Carroll) and her brother Gurnie (Ted Claassen), while Michael is mistaken by elderly sheriff Ed Hatfield (Allyn Joslyn) for the notorious outlaw "Desperate" Ambrose Littleberry (also played by John Astin) and jailed to wait for a trial, which is likely to end in execution by hanging. After being brought to the jail to vouch for Michael, Timothy pretends not to know him, believing that Michael is doing one of his cons.

Desperate spends most of his time with his gang of outlaws instead of being henpecked by his violent girlfriend Paloma (Lee Meriwether), who demands marriage after five years of cohabitation, as well as the return of a silver-framed photograph of her mother. After hearing that another man is to be executed in his name, Desperate disguises himself and sneaks into Michael's trial, but is forced to flee when he is identified publicly by an angry Paloma. A boozy and confused judge Quincey Trumbell (played by director Richard Erdman) acquits Michael of all charges.

When the town banker tells the mayor (Jesse White) that the millionaire industrialist Polonius Vandergelt (Hans Conried) plans to build a sawmill in town, the mayor quietly kills the deal. The mayor is being paid by Titanic Steel Company to stymie the town's development, thereby preventing anyone from discovering the mine's molybdenum, because its abundance would ruin Titanic's profits.

With the help of Callie and Gurnie, the O'Toole brothers set up a gambling casino and saloon to raise tourist money for the town, causing the mayor to worry about outsiders discovering the town's molybdenum. He tries to sabotage the casino's opening day by reviving a "spittin', belchin', and cussin' contest" at the same time, which has more appeal to the citizens than a casino. Timothy wins the belching contest, drawing the wrath of his brother Michael, who rants passionately in public at Timothy's behavior and at the citizens' resigned and fatalistic attitude, unintentionally winning the cussing contest (without using any obscenities).

Soon after, the aforementioned McClanahan arrives with Bonnie Lou. Upon learning that Michael's name is O'Toole, he believes that Michael is the culprit who violated his daughter. He has Michael jailed, and arranges a shotgun wedding, with Paloma as the bridesmaid. Desperate attends the wedding and assumes that Paloma is the bride, angering him to draw his own shotguns. At the same time, Polonius Vandergelt arrives in town to see about his sawmill, but from the town's name he realizes that the mines are full of molybdenum, a valuable resource for manufacturing high-strength steel. He purchases the outstanding shares in the mine from the citizens, much to the happiness of Paloma after Desperate reveals to her his cache of stock certificates.

The citizens leave town rich and happy, while the brothers O'Toole hide in a stable, glad to have survived their adventure.

== Cast ==
The cast that received billing on the movie poster, in alphabetical order:

- John Astin as Michael James O'Toole and "Desperate" Ambrose Littleberry
- Steve Carlson as Timothy O'Toole
- Pat Carroll as Callie Burdyne
- Ted Claassen as Gurnie Burdyne
- Hans Conried as Polonius Vandergelt
- Richard Erdman (film director) as Judge Quincey P. Trumbell
- Allyn Joslyn as Sherriff Ed Hatfield
- Richard Jury as Harmon P. Lovejoy, Molybdenum's undertaker
- Jesse White as the Mayor of Molybdenum

The cast is introduced in the opening credits with statements such as "The international favorite Mr. John Astin", "Mistress Pat Carroll", and "The Lusty Lee Meriwether" followed by "With a company of players including...." listing other actors, ending with "All ably abetted by an accomplished and harmonious group, including..." to introduce the crew. The majority of extras in non-speaking roles were drawn from Cañon City and Florence, Colorado, near the filming location.

== Production ==
The primary business of the production company CVD Studios, previously known as Creative Visual Dynamics, was producing television advertisements and short films. The Brothers O'Toole was the first of four feature films planned. The film had an alternate title Eureka! It's Molly B'Damn.

The main filming location was the theme park Buckskin Joe, near Cañon City, Colorado, on a budget of $300,000. Filming began in October 1972, was finished in February 1973, and its world premier occurred in Denver, Colorado on 16 May 1973.

This was the first successful film produced by Charles Sellier, then 30 years old, at the beginning of his career as film producer. He personally supervised the entire production of The Brothers O'Toole on location, saying about the filming, "we don't fake anything. When we do rain scenes we get right out in a downpour to do them; when it's a mud scene, we all get into the mud!"

Cinematographer Allen Daviau had previously worked on only short films including Mooch Goes to Hollywood with director Richard Erdman. He worked with Erdman again to shoot The Brothers O'Toole, also Daviau's first feature film.

The International Alliance of Theatrical Stage Employees sued the production company CVD for filming with a partially non-union crew while using the union emblem in the film's release, resulting in the emblem being removed from all copies of the film.

== Reception ==
When the film was released in 1973, it received generally positive reviews. The Brandenton Herald referred to it as a "hit film" that had been showing in various Florida cities "with great success." The Seguin Gazette-Enterprise wrote "In a time of over-exploited sex, violence and message motion pictures, this light-hearted movie is sheer good hearted entertainment" and "an entertainment treat for all ages." Perry Stewart of the Fort Worth Star-Telegram characterized the film as "slick and funny" in which "Astin excels in both halves of his dual role", but criticized the musical score as "mostly forgettable, but there are some toe-tapping moments on-screen provided by Rufus Krisp Blue Grass, a sort of poor man's edition of the Nitty Gritty Dirt Band."
