= Benji, Zax & the Alien Prince =

- DVD cover of episodes 10–13
- Created by: Joe Camp
- Based on: Benji created by Joe Camp
- Developed by: Len Janson; Chuck Menville
- Directed by: Joe Camp
- Starring: Benjean (as Benji); Christopher Burton
- Voices of: Ric Spiegel
- Composer: Euel Box
- Country of origin: United States
- No. of episodes: 13

Production
- Executive producers: Joseph Barbera; Margaret Loesch
- Producer: Carolyn Camp
- Editor: Scott Fillingham
- Running time: 20 minutes
- Production companies: Hanna-Barbera Productions; Mulberry Square Productions

Original release
- Network: CBS
- Release: September 17 – December 17, 1983

Benji, Zax & the Alien Prince is a live-action children's science fiction television series created by Joe Camp, the creator of the Benji film series. The series was produced by Hanna-Barbera Productions and Mulberry Square Productions, and it aired Saturday mornings on CBS in 1983 with repeats airing in the United States and internationally for a number of years through the 1980s. In the show, the dog Benji helps an alien prince and his droid evade various henchmen sent by a dictator to capture the prince.

The series was taped in various parts of the Dallas–Fort Worth Metroplex, with interiors taped at the Las Colinas studios in Irving, Texas. The entire series was released to DVD by GoodTimes Home Video as four separate releases of 3 or 4 episodes each and a single release with all 13 episodes.

== Plot ==
A tyrant named Zanu has taken control of the distant, red planet of Antars which is "way off in another galaxy" as Yubi describes in the episode "Double Trouble" while rehearsing exactly who he is and where he comes from. Zanu has the king of Antars killed and imprisons the queen. Lisa LeMole plays the queen in the episode "Goodbye Earth." Yubi's monologue from the episode "Double Trouble" explains, "My mother is there, probably in prison. My father is dead. I have a guardian. Sorta. He's not really a person. He's a droid. Also from Antars. And those people in the black van. You guessed it! From Antars!"

The opening sequence of the series shows how the crown prince, their son and heir prince Yubi, has escaped to Earth with his droid Zax. When Yubi and Zax land on Earth, they are befriended by a stray dog named Benji, who remains their companion for the run of the series. Two Antarian bounty hunters named Darah and Khyber, along with their droid Zord (Level 10 programing), are sent to Earth to find and to capture Yubi. Most of the plot involves Darah and Khyber chasing Benji, Zax and Yubi in a black Chevy van, and their efforts almost always end in failure, usually due to some failure of one or both of them combined with Benji's incredible intelligence and loyal assistance. There is never any doubt that Benji is a major heroic figure for this show who seems to do an often better job protecting his highness than the level 2 droid assigned to him.

In order to survive on Earth, Antarians must wear a special bracelet known as a cipher. In the episode "The Locals", Prince Yubi's cipher is stolen by a gang of boys known as "The Vikings" and he gets very sick without it. Within seconds of the cipher's removal, Yubi faints, suggesting to more observant viewers that this life support device helps Yubi to breathe in some way. This is logical since the atmosphere is likely to be very different on Antars than on Earth. Every Antarian in the series is highly protective of their cipher, experiencing the immediate onset of fatigue as a result of its theft (Benji steals first Darah's then Khyber's cipher in the episode "Gold Mine" to force them to share a cipher and therefore rendering them unable to detect the nearby orgon signature from Trask's ship).

Beyond principal hunters Darah (Angie Bolling; episodes 1-7 and Anna Holbrook; episodes 8-13) and Khyber (Joe Rainer; episodes 1-7 and Dallas Miles; episodes 8-13), the episode "UFO" also features Ric Spiegel as hunter Harwell Thompson. The episode "Puppy Love" features Tosha Moody as Tanya, a secret agent of Zanu. Burton also played T.J. Parker (an Earth boy) in the episode "Double Trouble" who shoplifted a general store, which led to Yubi being arrested due to their striking resemblance to each other, while Khyber and Darah kidnap T.J. whom they mistake for the Prince.

== Characters ==
=== Main characters ===
- Benji - The protagonist of the series. He is a stray dog who lives in Texas and befriends Yubi and Zax when they crash-land on Earth. He is very protective and caring of Yubi and comes up with ideas to evade and outsmart the two hunters sent to capture Yubi. He is referred by Antarians as a quadruped, since he walks on four legs.
- Zax - A Level 2 droid assigned to Yubi. He has the ability to translate Benji and receive audio-visual signals.
- Prince Yubi - A young Antarian who is forced to flee to Earth from Zanu's tyranny with Benji and Zax by their side and to avoid capture from the hunters pursuing them.

=== Supporting characters ===
- Lucy - A bag lady who encounters Benji in the first episode. When Zax is damaged while being chased by the hunters, she takes him with her by mistake. She then rescues Yubi from the hunters and distracts them to give them time to escape.
- Trask - An old Antarian who used to be Zanu's right-hand man. He was presumed dead when he escaped to Earth and pretended to be a man named Montana. He meets up with Yubi and offers a job to herd cattle. He explains his history with Zanu and the trio help him repair his ship to return to Antars, while Benji has the hunters distracted.
- The Queen - The queen of Antars until she is overthrown and imprisoned by Zanu. She makes an appearance in the episode "Goodbye to Earth", where she sends Yubi a birthday message. Yubi gets a job at NASA in order to return to Antars until he relents and quits his job.
- The King - The former king of Antars. Not much is known about him other than the fact that he was murdered by Zanu.
- Mr. Stevens - A senior worker at NASA. He reluctantly hires Yubi when he wants to test his ship, who actually wants to go back home to see his mother, in spite of Zax's warnings to not endanger her wishes until he relents and quits his job until he's old enough to face Zanu.
- Farley and BJ Matthews - A pair of fugitives who flee to a ghostown. They meet up with Yubi and come up with a plan to ransom his parents, so they can become rich with his cipher until they realize who the hunters really are. Farley is wiser than his younger brother, whereas BJ is much more paranoid and tries to warn his older brother about Zax's presence, to no avail. They tie up the hunters and tell the trio to move along before the police arrive.
- Joey - A member of a local gang called "The Vikings" and the only reluctant member. He was forced by his leader, Will to steal Yubi's cipher, leaving him to become very ill without it. He eventually makes up and teams up with Benji to get Yubi's cipher back before quitting his gang along with the other members.
- Tanya - A young girl from Antars sent by Zanu to capture Yubi. However, she has actually grown fond of Yubi when she meets him at a skating rink. When Benji and Zax learn of this, Tanya is forced to end her relationship and abandons her mission to capture him.
- Pop Wilcox - A local fisherman who hires Yubi. When he tells Yubi to get him groceries, Yubi is arrested by mistake after TJ Parker shoplifts Ross' store until Zax informs him about Yubi.
- Sheriff Payton - The police chief of Rockwell County, Texas. He arrests Yubi after TJ Parker shoplifts Ross' store until Benji and Zax rescue Parker from the hunters.
- Charlie Ross - A kind-hearted businessman who works at a local grocery store in Garland, Texas. He mistakes Yubi for TJ Parker until Benji and Zax rescue Parker from the hunters.
- Dr. Len Janson - A veterinarian who originally worked as a World War II pilot. He is the husband of Nora and offers a job for the trio. When the hunters arrive, they gravely injure his horse, Sugarfoot and they are forced to get him to a faraway animal shelter with his plane. They eventually manage to get him to the shelter and return home.
- Sugarfoot - The Jansons' black stallion. He tries to fend off the hunters chasing the trio, but ends up getting run over. Len and the trio manage to get him to a faraway shelter and the vet states that he would be home within two weeks.
- RJ Jenkins - A man who finds Benji and unknowingly sells him to a greedy couple. When Yubi and Zax offer a job in exchange for Benji, the robbers break into his home and Jenkins blames Yubi until Zax informs him about the real burglars. They manage to track them down and get them arrested. Benji then gets Jenkins a white dog named Tiffany and he adopts her.
- Tiffany - A female Maltese who is Benji's love interest. She appears in the episode "Benji Call Home", where she eventually gets adopted by Jenkins.

=== Villains ===
- Zanu - A tyrannical warlord who takes control of Antars and overthrows Yubi's family, forcing Yubi and Zax to flee to Earth. Zanu sends his right-hand hunters, Darah and Khyber to capture Yubi and take him back. In the episode "Goldmine", it is stated by Trask that he was associated with Zanu during the revolution until he revealed his true colors and his efforts to stop him were unsuccessful.
- Darah and Khyber - Zanu's primary hunters who are the main antagonists of the series. They arrive at Earth to capture Yubi, but their efforts are almost unsuccessful, usually due to Benji's quick thinking and loyal assistance to Yubi. They pursue Yubi in a black chevy van and are accompanied by a Level 10 droid named Zord for assistance.
- Zord - Darah and Khyber's Level 10 droid sent by Zanu to catch Yubi. Despite being destroyed in the episode "Ghostown" by Benji and Zax, he returned in the later episodes. Whenever he has plans to capture Benji, he thinks about brainwashing him to have him lead them to the prince, despite Darah's protests that the brainwave manipulator is designed for humans.
- Harwell Thompson - An Antarian hunter whose real motives to capture Yubi are to become rich and humiliate Darah and Khyber. He posts a fake news article about a spacecraft from Antars and kidnaps Yubi and Zax. However, Benji foils his plans by leading the hunters to his location and allowing them to escape.
- The Rustlers - A pair of rustlers who try to steal Trask's cattle and break into his goldmine. However, their efforts are unsuccessful when Benji and Zax scare them away.
- Will - The leader of a local gang known as "The Vikings." He develops a grudge against Benji for stealing his hot dog and offers Yubi to challenge him to beat at an arcade game. After Yubi wins, Will plans to use his cipher to become rich and Joey is forced to remove Yubi's cipher to avoid his wrath, resulting in Yubi becoming ill without it. However, Benji and Joey team up to reclaim his cipher and Joey and the other members of the gang abandon Will.
- TJ Parker - A mischievous boy who resembles Yubi and shoplifts a store belonging to Charlie Ross. This results in him getting captured by the hunters and getting Yubi arrested. Oblivious about the danger, he insists on going with them to space until Benji and Zax rescue them and the police send him on his way to compensate Ross for his misdeeds.
- Johnny and Marge Stevens - A greedy couple who buy Benji from Jenkins and rob him the next day. However, their plans are foiled when the trio track them down and get arrested.
- Circon - A Level 2 droid sent by the hunters to impersonate Zax and lure Yubi into their trap. However, Benji sees under the trick, due to his lack of arachnophobia and leads him to get trapped. The hunters return and switch him back on, but Benji leads him to get shot and destroyed by the hunters by mistake.

== Episode list ==
No.	Title	Directed by	Written by	Original release date
1	"The Prince and the Bag Lady"	Joe Camp	Len Janson; Chuck Menville	September 17, 1983
While walking through town, Benji and Zax notice Zanu's hunters and are chased into an auto junkyard. Zax is badly damaged and eventually captured by the hunters, but Benji comes up with a plan to rescue him. Guest Stars: Esther Benson (Lucy), Al Evans (Junkyard Proprietor), John MacLean (Joe Bob)
2	"U.F.O."	Joe Camp	Len Janson; Chuck Menville	September 24, 1983
Benji and Zax investigate a newspaper report of a spacecraft from Prince Yubi's planet. They encounter a man named Harwell Thompson, who is revealed to be a hunter from Antars. Thompson kidnaps Yubi and captures Zax, but Benji rescues them before the other hunters could get to them. Guest Stars: Ric Spiegel (Harwell Thompson), Jerry L. Nelson (Verne), Pam Evans (Carol Ann), L. Bayne Stanton (Old Geezer), Ben Jones (Restaurant Proprietor), Brandon Camp (Kid 1), Charles Townsend (Kid 2)
3	"The Day of the Hunter"	Joe Camp	Story by : John Bradford; Glenn Leopold; Teleplay by : John Bradford	October 1, 1983
The hunters draw Yubi out of hiding by leaking the location of his spacecraft to the authorities while using Benji as a distraction against them. As the hunters prepare to leave Earth with Yubi, Benji and Zax distract the hunters and rescue Yubi before they could take off. Guest Stars: John Jackson (Young Man at Diner), Hugh Lampman (TV Newscaster), Gil Glasgow (Cop), Ben Jones (Guard with Megaphone)
4	"Goldmine"	Joe Camp	Len Janson; Chuck Menville	October 8, 1983
Yubi learns the startling secret of an old cattleman with a closely guarded mine, who is revealed to be an Antarian named Trask. The hunters recognize him and plan to capture him, but Trask launches his ship to Antars. Guest Stars: Kelvin Dacus (Montana/Trask), Kerry Graves (Rustler 1 [Gerald]), Mark McCoy (Rustler 2), Julie Fick (Girl 1), Kent Bushart (Boy 1)
5	"Goodbye Earth"	Joe Camp	Ray Parker	October 15, 1983
A birthday hologram from his mother inspires Yubi's desperate search for a job at a NASA station to reunite to his mother. Guest Stars: Rick Peeples (Mr. Stevens), Bill Wayne Martin (Jr. Culpeeper), Lisa LeMole (The Queen), Hugh Lampman (Newscaster), Greta Muller (Waitress), J. David Moeller (Control Booth Guard), Debra Mason (Lady Worker), Ben Jones (Guard 1), Dwain Fail (Guard 2)
6	"Ghostown"	Joe Camp	John Bradford	October 22, 1983
The trio winds up in a deserted ghostown, where two outlaw twins are hiding out from the authorities. Zax is convinced they want to sell Yubi for profit, but Yubi ignores him. Meanwhile, the hunters come up with a plan to capture Yubi with their Level 10 droid named Zord, but Benji and Zax defeat him and the brothers capture the hunters. Guest Stars: Craig Lewis (B.J. Mathews), Ken Farmer (Farley Matthews)
7	"The Locals"	Joe Camp	Gene Ayres	October 29, 1983
Benji is harassed by a group of boys known as "The Vikings" and they endanger Yubi's life by stealing his cipher. Benji and Zax come up with a plan to get it back with the help of a Viking named Joey. Guest Stars: Bobby Fite (Will), Brandon Camp (Joey), Atticus Wisener (Billy), Jason Carter (Fred), Matt Everheart (Viking 5), Dwain Fail (Hot Dog Stand Chef), Malcolm Wittman (Arcade Owner), J. David Moeller (Town Character 1), Jerry L. Nelson (Town Character 2), Police Officer (Gil Glasgow), Beverly Renquist (Passerby)
8	"Puppy Love"	Joe Camp	Len Janson; Chuck Menville	November 5, 1983
Yubi meets up with a girl named Tanya and falls in love with her, but Zax is concerned for his safety and it is revealed that Tanya is an Antarian who is sent by Zanu to capture Yubi. The hunters capture Benji and try to brainwash him to lead them to Yubi's location, but Benji outwits them. Tanya confesses to Yubi and plans to go back to Antars to keep Yubi covered. Guest Stars: Tosha Moody (Tanya), Rick Peeples (Policeman), Greta Muller (Lady at Plant Sale), Vince Davis (Plant Salesperson), Susan Phillips (Lady at Skating Rink), Don Wyse (Roller Rink Manager)
9	"Double Trouble"	Joe Camp	John Bradford	November 12, 1983
A local boy named T.J. Parker shoplifts a store and led to Yubi arrested due to their striking resemblance, while the hunters mistake Parker for the prince. Benji and Zax plan to set things right, but when the hunters realize the mistake, they go back and disguise themselves as Yubi's parents. However, Benji stops them and the hunters are arrested and Yubi is set free. Guest Stars: Randy Tallman (Pop Wilcox), Jack Robinson (Sheriff Billy Payton), Christopher Burton (T. J. Parker), Bill Wayne Martin (Charlie Ross), Lee Ritchey (Desk Sergeant), Alan Ackles (Leroy), Johnnie Hensley (Mr. Parker), J. Katherine Durbin (Mrs. Parker), Mike Beesly (Deputy)
10	"Don't Fence Me In"	Joe Camp	Ray Parker	November 19, 1983
Yubi has had enough of Zax's constant parenting and moves away. Zax's malfunctioning is getting worse and Benji comes to his aid while Yubi becomes an unwitting pool shark. Guest Stars: Ken Farmer (Earl), Marc Baxley (Big Eddie), Randy Tallman (Bud), J. Terry McIlvain (Johnny), Marc Stokes (Catcher/Battler), Brandon Camp (Tommy), Debra Mason (Saleslady), Amanda Sickler (Girl), Mame Hutchinson (Mary)
11	"The Flying Lesson"	Joe Camp	John Bradford	December 3, 1983
Yubi wants to surprise a kindly veterinarian by restoring an old World War II plane. However, when the hunters discover them, their horse, Sugarfoot, tries to protect them, but is gravely wounded. The trio decide to use the old war plane to get Sugarfoot to an animal hospital far away. Guest Stars: Bob Magruder (Dr. Len Janson), Nancy Miller (Nora Janson), Sugarfoot, Joe Camp (Tower Voices)
12	"Benji Call Home"	Joe Camp	Ray Parker	December 10, 1983
When Benji takes some extra time to play with Tiffany, a wealthy man named Jenkins takes Benji and unknowingly gives him to a crooked couple claiming to be his real owners. When Yubi and Zax arrive, Jenkins offers them a job to get Benji back while the couple break into Jenkins' house to get his money. Jenkins assumes it was Yubi, but Zax tells him that it was the campers. Yubi, Zax and Jenkins arrive at the camp to rescue Benji and catch the two criminals. Guest Stars: Michael Muller (R.J. Jenkins), Ben Jones (Willard), Craig Lewis (Johnny Stevens), Shelia Anderson (Marge Stevens), Tiffany, Scott Fillingham (Newscaster Voice)
13	"Decoy Droid"	Joe Camp	Michael Reaves; John Bradford	December 17, 1983
Benji and Zax are attacked by a bigger dog and Zax gets trapped in a culvert. Meanwhile, the hunters capture Zax and send an evil duplicate named Circon to lure Yubi into their trap. Benji sees under the trick, because Zax is the only droid who has arachnophobia and traps him in the same culvert Zax was in before shutting him off. However, the hunters return and switch him back on, but Benji tricks them into shooting Circon after mistaking him for Zax. Guest Stars: Ric Spiegel (Circon)
