= Euel Box =

- Born: December 31, 1928; Georgetown, Texas, United States
- Died: February 28, 2017 (aged 88) Dallas, Texas, United States
- Genres: Film score
- Occupations: Composer, music producer
- Instrument: Trumpet

Euel Box (December 31, 1928 – February 28, 2017) was an American music producer, composer, arranger, and trumpeter who wrote major film scores and radio jingles for major markets.

== Early years ==
=== College ===
Box was born in Georgetown, Texas. He studied composition at the University of North Texas College of Music in the 1950s and earned a Bachelor of Music Degree in June 1951. and continued post-graduate studies in composition through the early 1950s. One of his composition teachers was Violet Archer, resident composer. He was classmates with undergraduate student composer Larry Austin, Eloy Fominaya and graduate students Robert Gauldin and Clifford Shipp. Before studying at North Texas, Box spent his first two years of college (1948–49 & 1949–50) at Southwestern University.

=== Post college ===
Box played trumpet in the United States Marine Band; produced music (composed, arranged, recorded, conducted) for major radio markets in the North America, London, Luxembourg, and Australia. He composed film music for Braniff International Airways, Dr. Pepper, Buick, the United States Navy, Haggar Slacks, Zale Corporation, Texas Instruments, LTV Aerospace, and Bell Helicopter.

=== Songwriter ===
Box was a songwriter for several films, including Benji, For the Love of Benji, The Double McGuffin, Hawmps!, and Oh Heavenly Dog. He recorded and conducted for various artists including Stevie Wonder, Boz Scaggs, Glen Campbell, Lou Rawls, Charlie Rich, and Chet Atkins. As a recording artist, he had 2 albums. In 1974, Euel, as composer, and his wife, Betty, as lyricist, received a Golden Globe Award for Best Original Song — "I Feel Love" — from the film Benji. The song also earned the two a 1974 Academy Award nomination in the same category — Best Original Song. In that film and other projects, his chief collaborators were Betty Box and Joe Camp. His songs included, "I Feel the Love," "Sunshine Smiles," "Multiplicity," "Live for Today," and "Somebody Who Really Cares."

=== Family ===
Box married Betty Ruth McCrary and had three children.

== Film scores ==
- 1974 — Benji
  - "I Feel Love"
- 1976 — Hawmps!
- 1977 — Charge of the Model T's
- 1978 — For the Love of Benji
- 1978 — Benji's Very Own Christmas Story
  - "Multiplicity" ("I Am What People Think of Me")
- 1979 — The Double McGuffin
- 1980 — Oh Heavenly Dog
- 1987 — Benji the Hunted

== Awards ==
Benji earned Euel Box and his wife, Betty, a 1975 nomination for an Oscar and won a Golden Globe Award for Best Song From a Motion Picture. The award-winning song was "I Feel Love." Euel wrote the music and Betty wrote the words. Betty also studied music at North Texas, graduating in 1952 and, with Euel, started college at Southwestern University in 1948–49.

== Jingles ==
- "Frito Twist/How To Twist" — advertising promotion for Frito-Lay. "Frito Twist/How to Twist" was recorded in Dallas, Texas, by the PAMS Jingle Studio. "Frito Twist/How to Twist," Fritos promo 45 rpm (1962)
- "My Home Town" jingle on YouTube produced by PAMS, composed by Euel Box, et al.
