= Allen Daviau =

American cinematographer (1942–2020)

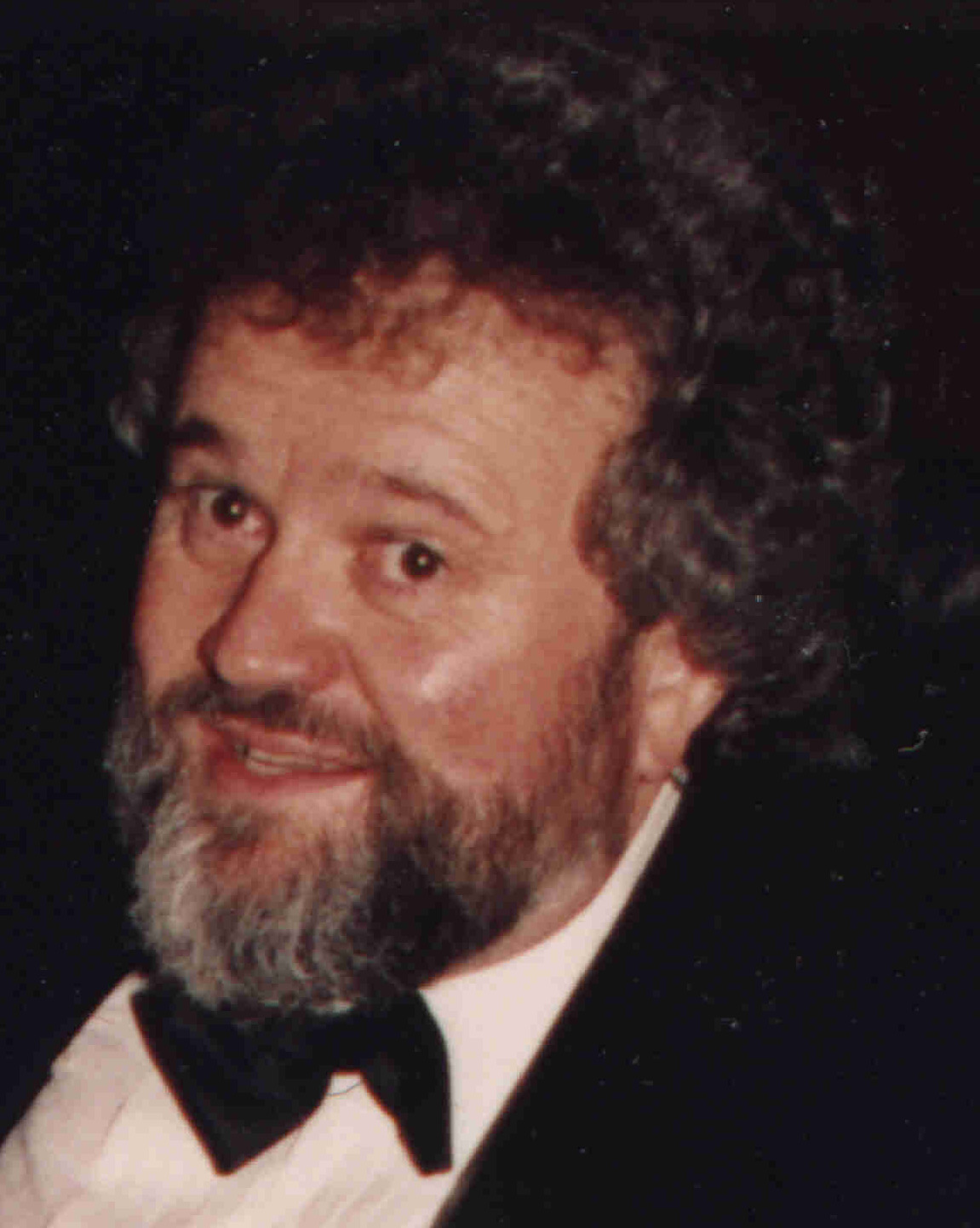
- Born: John Allen Daviau; June 14, 1942; New Orleans, Louisiana, U.S.
- Died: April 15, 2020 (aged 77); Los Angeles, California, U.S.
- Occupation: Cinematographer
- Years active: 1967–2010
- Relatives: Anne Rice (cousin); Alice Borchardt (cousin)

John Allen Daviau (June 14, 1942 – April 15, 2020) was an American cinematographer known for his collaborations with Steven Spielberg on E.T. the Extra-Terrestrial (1982), The Color Purple (1985), and Empire of the Sun (1987). He received five Academy Award nominations and two British Academy Film Award nominations, with one win. In addition to his work in film, Daviau served as Cinematographer-in-Residence at UCLA.

== Career ==
Daviau was born on June 14, 1942, in New Orleans, and raised in Los Angeles. He graduated from Loyola High School in 1960. He entered the profession shooting music videos in the years before MTV, among them films for the Animals and the Jimi Hendrix Experience.

He was introduced to Steven Spielberg in the late 1960s and the two went on to work together on two early short films. The first, Amblin' (1968), was Spielberg's first film shot on 35 mm, a 26-minute short carried by music and sound effects rather than dialogue; Spielberg later said the two had begun their careers side by side on it. They continued their professional working career by collaborating on E.T. the Extra-Terrestrial (1982); "Kick the Can," a segment from Twilight Zone: The Movie (1983), The Color Purple (1985), an episode of the NBC anthology series Amazing Stories titled "Ghost Train" (1985), and Empire of the Sun (1987).

Daviau's work also includes John Schlesinger's The Falcon and the Snowman (1985), the Spielberg-produced Harry and the Hendersons (1987), Albert Brooks' Defending Your Life (1991), Barry Levinson's Avalon (1990) and Bugsy (1991), Peter Weir's Fearless (1993), Frank Marshall's Congo (1995), Rand Ravich's The Astronaut's Wife (1999) and Stephen Sommers' Van Helsing (2004), his final feature. He also photographed the Gobi desert sequence for Spielberg's Close Encounters of the Third Kind (1977).

He received lifetime achievement awards from the Art Directors Guild in 1997 and the American Society of Cinematographers in 2007.

Daviau shot thousands of commercials, documentaries, industrials and educational films, and created psychedelic special-effects lighting for Roger Corman's The Trip (1967) before he gained entry into the International Photographers Guild.

=== E.T. the Extra-Terrestrial ===
While doing a lawnmower commercial in Arizona, Daviau learned that Spielberg was looking for a cinematographer for E.T. and sent the director a tape of The Boy Who Drank Too Much, a 1980 telefilm that he shot. "It had a lot of mood, and it's about kids, so I knew Steven would watch it!" Daviau said. Spielberg stated that he contacted Daviau for his next feature, saying, "I did something I rarely do. I didn't think twice; I picked up the phone and asked Allen if he would photograph my next feature."

In preparing the film the two screened pictures together, among them The Night of the Hunter, Alien, Apocalypse Now and Last Tango in Paris, to settle on an approach.

== Personal life and death ==
Daviau was cousins with author Anne Rice. Following a surgical procedure in 2012, Daviau began using a wheelchair. He died on April 15, 2020, at the age of 77, as a result of complications from COVID-19 at the Motion Picture & Television Country House and Hospital. The hospital had been his home for several years, and he was the fourth resident there to die of the disease.

== Filmography ==
Short film

| Year | Title | Director | Notes |
|---|---|---|---|
| 1968 | Amblin' | Steven Spielberg | |
| 1975 | Names of Sin | Rolf Forsberg | |
| 1983 | Kick the Can | Steven Spielberg | Segments of Twilight Zone: The Movie |
| 1983 | It's a Good Life | Joe Dante | Segments of Twilight Zone: The Movie |
| 2000 | The Translator | Leslie Anne Smith | |
| 2001 | Sweet | Elyse Couvillion | |
| 2002 | The Routine | Bob Giraldi | |
| 2004 | ASC-DCI StEM | | Also writer |
| 2004 | How to Be a Hollywood Player in Less Than Ten Minutes | Joe Hudson | |
| 2010 | The Caretaker 3D | Sean Isroelit | With Svetlana Cvetko |

Documentary film

| Year | Title | Director | Notes |
|---|---|---|---|
| 1971 | Say Goodbye | David H. Vowell | |
| 1973 | New Gladiators | Bob Hammer | With John Hora |
| 2004 | Olive or Twist 2004 | Peter Moody | With Tchell De Paepe, Joachim Hanwright and Michael Knight |

Feature film

| Year | Title | Director |
|---|---|---|
| 1973 | The Brothers O'Toole | Richard Erdman |
| 1974 | Mother Tiger Mother Tiger | Rolf Forsberg |
| 1982 | Harry Tracy, Desperado | William A. Graham |
| 1982 | E.T. the Extra-Terrestrial | Steven Spielberg |
| 1985 | The Falcon and the Snowman | John Schlesinger |
| 1985 | The Color Purple | Steven Spielberg |
| 1987 | Empire of the Sun | Steven Spielberg |
| 1987 | Harry and the Hendersons | William Dear |
| 1990 | Avalon | Barry Levinson |
| 1991 | Defending Your Life | Albert Brooks |
| 1991 | Bugsy | Barry Levinson |
| 1993 | Fearless | Peter Weir |
| 1995 | Congo | Frank Marshall |
| 1999 | The Astronaut's Wife | Rand Ravich |
| 2004 | Van Helsing | Stephen Sommers |

TV movies

| Year | Title | Director |
|---|---|---|
| 1974 | Mooch Goes to Hollywood | Richard Erdman |
| 1979 | The Streets of L.A. | Jerrold Freedman |
| 1980 | The Boy Who Drank Too Much | Jerrold Freedman |
| 1980 | Rage! | William Graham |
| 1983 | Legs | Jerold Freedman |

TV series

| Year | Title | Director | Episode |
|---|---|---|---|
| 1982 | McDonaldland | Lee Chapman | "Skating" |
| 1985 | Amazing Stories | Steven Spielberg | "Ghost Train" |
| 1996 | International Cinematographer's Guild Heritage Series | Jay Nefcy | "Vittorio Storaro" |

== Awards and nominations ==
| Organization | Year | Category | Title | Result |
|---|---|---|---|---|
| Academy Awards | 1982 | Best Cinematography | E.T. the Extra-Terrestrial | Nominated |
| Academy Awards | 1985 | Best Cinematography | The Color Purple | Nominated |
| Academy Awards | 1987 | Best Cinematography | Empire of the Sun | Nominated |
| Academy Awards | 1990 | Best Cinematography | Avalon | Nominated |
| Academy Awards | 1991 | Best Cinematography | Bugsy | Nominated |
| American Society of Cinematographers | 1987 | Outstanding Achievement in Cinematography | Empire of the Sun | Won |
| American Society of Cinematographers | 1990 | Outstanding Achievement in Cinematography | Avalon | Nominated |
| American Society of Cinematographers | 1991 | Outstanding Achievement in Cinematography | Bugsy | Won |
| BAFTA Film Awards | 1982 | Best Cinematography | E.T. the Extra-Terrestrial | Nominated |
| BAFTA Film Awards | 1987 | Best Cinematography | Empire of the Sun | Won |
| Boston Society of Film Critics | 1982 | Best Cinematography | E.T. the Extra-Terrestrial | Won |
| Dallas–Fort Worth Film Critics Association | 1991 | Best Cinematography | Bugsy | Nominated |
| National Society of Film Critics | 1991 | Best Cinematography | Bugsy | Nominated |
| New York Film Critics Circle | 1987 | Best Cinematography | Empire of the Sun | Nominated |
