= Benji the Hunted =

1987 American adventure drama film

- Theatrical release poster
- Directed by: Joe Camp
- Written by: Joe Camp
- Produced by: Ben Vaughn
- Starring: Benjean; Red Steagall; Frank Inn; Nancy Francis
- Cinematography: Don Reddy
- Edited by: Karen Thorndike
- Music by: Betty Box; Euel Box
- Production companies: Walt Disney Pictures; Mulberry Square Productions; Silver Screen Partners III
- Distributed by: Buena Vista Pictures Distribution
- Release date: June 5, 1987
- Running time: 89 minutes
- Country: United States
- Language: English
- Box office: $15.2 million

Benji the Hunted is a 1987 American adventure drama film directed and written by Joe Camp and produced by Ben Vaughn. It is the fourth film in the Benji series. The film is about Benji trying to survive in the wilderness and looking after orphan cougar cubs after their mother is shot and killed by a hunter. It was released by Walt Disney Pictures. This was the last Benji movie to star Benjean, daughter of Higgins, in the title role.

== Plot ==
In Oregon, Benji has gone missing while filming a movie. Benji's trainer, Frank Inn, tells a reporter that he and Benji had been on a fishing boat in the Pacific when a storm caused the vessel to capsize. Inn fears that Benji is dead, but the movie producers plan to use a helicopter to search for him.

The next day, Benji lies near the shoreline when a helicopter flies overhead but he goes unnoticed. Benji wanders the woods and sees a female cougar just as a hunter shoots it. Benji tries to comfort the dying animal, but the hunter drives him off and carries away the dead cougar. When the helicopter flies overhead again, Benji runs after it while barking to no avail. Benji encounters four cougar cubs that belong to the killed cougar and decides to look after them. While hunting, Benji comes face to face with a rabbit but spares it. Benji finds a cabin, home of the hunter he encountered earlier, where a pheasant is being cooked over a fire and two other dead pheasants are hanging on a line nearby. He takes one of the pheasants from the line back for the cubs.

The next day, Benji returns to the cabin to get the other dead pheasant, but the hunter catches and ties him up. Reading Benji's license, the hunter remembers there is a reward for the dog's rescue. When the hunter goes inside, Benji tries to break free. Just then, a black wolf growls at Benji. When the hunter comes outside, the wolf runs away. The wolf returns and Benji makes a commotion. The hunter comes outside, scaring away the wolf. The hunter briefly unties Benji to unravel his rope. Benji grabs the other dead pheasant and runs back to return to the cubs.

Benji sees an adult female cougar with a cub and barks, but she attacks him. Benji tries to show one of the cubs, but the helicopter scares the female who flees with her cub following her. While doing this, the helicopter flies overhead and Benji sees his trainer in the window. He wants to join him but remembers that without him the cubs will be lost. Meanwhile, another animal has eaten the quail. Benji then moves the cubs to a new location, following the cougar mother. Meanwhile, the wolf begins to move in on the cubs, but the helicopter scares him away.

The next day, Benji sees the cougar and the wolf nearby. The wolf chases Benji but Benji manages to escape. Later, the four cubs follow Benji. A large grizzly bear comes into the clearing. Benji and the cubs hide but one of the cubs tries to confront the bear. The bear scares the cub back to the hiding place. When the bear moves toward them, Benji barks and runs in the opposite direction. The bear chases but soon loses interest. However, the wolf appears again and chases Benji for a long distance until Benji leads the wolf to the bear who chases away the wolf.

Later, the female cougar and her cub cross a river just as the helicopter flies overhead, scaring away the cougar again. When Benji spots the cougar again, he barks at the cubs to follow him across the stream. The helicopter lands nearby and Inn gets out, calling for Benji who sees him, but decides to help the cubs before he can reunite with his owner. Unaware Benji is nearby, Inn leaves in his helicopter. Soon after, an eagle grabs one of the cubs and flies off. A few minutes later, the eagle returns to catch one of the remaining cubs, but Benji manages to fend it off.

Benji spots the cougar and barks at her until she gives chase, but Benji loses her along the way but almost runs off a cliff concealed by bushes. Later on afterwards, Benji had an idea after he finds the cougar near the waterfall. figuring that she is going to a valley over a cliff right above him and the cubs, he decides to get her to come to them above. During which, he blocks another pathway to the valley in order to slow her down while get the cubs above the top before her. When Benji runs to get the cubs afterwards, he finds the wolf stalking the cubs. Benji barks at the wolf and attacks him to draw his attention. As the wolf gives chase, Benji tricks the wolf by hiding in the bushes concealing the cliff that he nearly fell off and sends the wolf off the cliff to his death. Benji calls the cubs to come out from under the rock and carries them up the steep mountain. With all three cubs on the mountaintop, the cougar and her cub arrives and appears to adopt them. As Benji leaves, he and the four cubs exchange affectionate looks to each as if they are saying goodbye. Benji then goes to rest in plain sight just as the helicopter approaches.

== Cast ==
- Benjean as Benji
- Malina as a cougar cub
- Gideon as the mother cougar
- Dimitri as the timber wolf
- Frank Inn as himself, Benji's owner
- Red Steagall as the hunter
- Nancy Francis as Mary Beth McLaulin, a news reporter
- Joe Camp as the TV director (voice)
- Steve Zanolini as the producer (voice)
- Mike Francis as the TV cameraman
- Ben Vaughn as the engineer's hand
- Karen Thorndike as countdown (voice)
- Guy Hovis as the balladeer
- Ben Morgan as himself

== Music ==
The film's score was written by Betty Box and Euel Box. The film features one original song, "Too Many Yesterdays," with lyrics by Joe Camp and music by Betty Box and Euel Box. Guy Hovis performs the song which plays during the film's opening credits.

== Location ==
Benji the Hunted was filmed entirely on location in Oregon and on Table Mountain, Washington.

== Critical reception ==
On Siskel & Ebert & The Movies, film critic Roger Ebert gave "Thumbs Up" rating for the film. Gene Siskel gave the film a "Thumbs Down", accusing Ebert of liking the film more than Stanley Kubrick's Full Metal Jacket, which was reviewed in the same episode. In response, Ebert insisted that every film needs to be judged in its proper context.

As of March 2022, Benji the Hunted held a 55% rating on Rotten Tomatoes, based on 11 reviews.

It grossed $15,212,539 at the US box office.

The film was subjected to a series of lawsuits, which were filed by Vestron Inc. and Vestron Video against Buena Vista Home Video, Walt Disney Pictures and Television, Embark Productions, Embark Releasing, Benji/Tracker, Starwolf and Airline Containers. The legal action commenced in 1985 when Mulberry Square Productions sued Vestron Video for a breach of contract.
