= Jungle Raiders =

Jungle Raiders may refer to:

- Jungle Raiders (serial), a 1945 serial film
- Jungle Raiders (1985 film), a 1985 film by Antonio Margheriti
