= Christopher Connelly =

American actor (1941–1988)

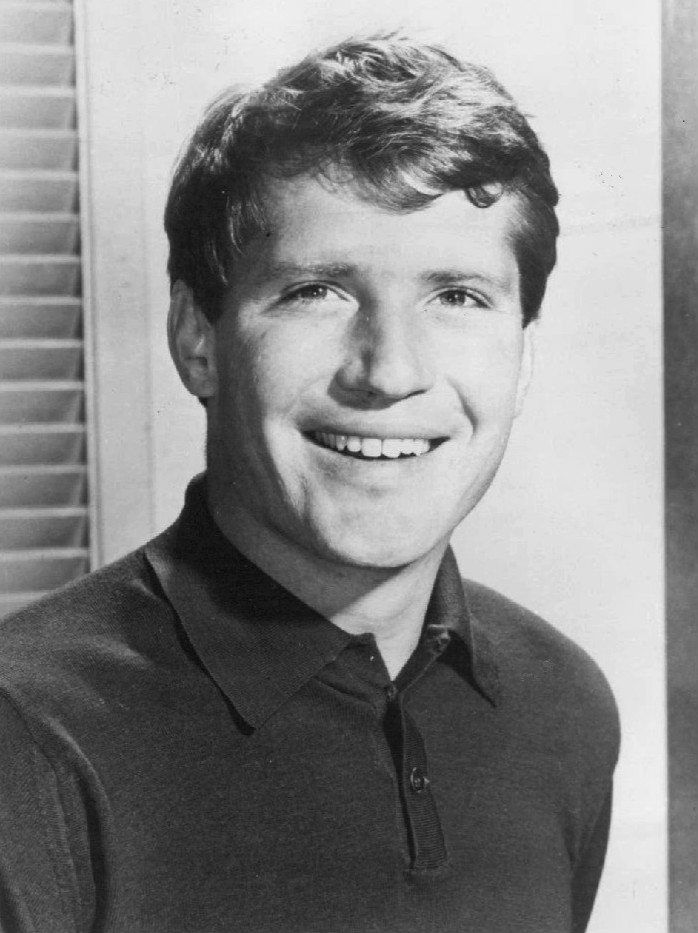
- As Norman Harrington, Peyton Place
- Born: September 8, 1941; Wichita, Kansas, U.S.
- Died: December 7, 1988 (aged 47); Burbank, California, U.S.
- Resting place: Forest Lawn Memorial Park (Hollywood Hills)
- Occupation: Actor
- Years active: 1963–1988
- Spouse: Cindy Carol (m. 1969)
- Children: 2

Christopher Connelly (September 8, 1941 – December 7, 1988) was an American actor, best known for his role as Norman Harrington in the successful prime time ABC soap opera Peyton Place. He stayed with the series during its entire five-year run, from 1964 to 1969.

== Early life ==
Connelly graduated from Missouri Military Academy in Mexico, Missouri.

== Career ==
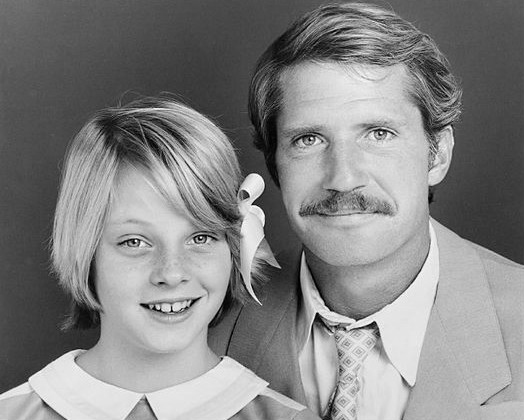
Jodie Foster and Connelly in Paper Moon in 1974

In addition to his aforementioned series-long run on ABC's Peyton Place, Connelly guest-starred in 1973 on Lorne Greene's short-lived ABC crime drama Griff, and in 1974, he starred in the television series Paper Moon, with a young Jodie Foster playing his daughter. The series was based on the film of the same name but was cancelled after only a few months. The film version starred Connelly's former Peyton Place costar Ryan O'Neal — who had played Connelly's brother in the serial — and O'Neal's daughter Tatum O'Neal.

In 1964, he appeared as "Trainey", a reform school kid in the episode "The Warden" on Gunsmoke with George Kennedy. Connelly also starred in the films Corky (1972), They Only Kill Their Masters (1972), Benji (1974) and Liar's Moon (1982).

He also released a long-playing record of his singing, titled The Boy from Peyton Place on Phillips Records.

== Later career and death ==
In the 1980s, Connelly made numerous appearances in Italian cult B-movies such as Lucio Fulci's Manhattan Baby, Enzo G. Castellari's 1990: The Bronx Warriors, Ruggero Deodato's The Atlantis Interceptors, and Antonio Margheriti's Jungle Raiders. He also made guest appearances on dozens of television series, such as The Brian Keith Show, the miniseries The Martian Chronicles, Martin Eden, Airwolf, CHiPs, and the television movie Return of the Rebels.

After a two-year battle with lung cancer, Connelly died at home in December 1988, and was buried at Forest Lawn in Hollywood Hills.

== Partial filmography ==
- The Alfred Hitchcock Hour (1963) (Season 2 Episode 7: "Starring the Defense") as Rudy Trask
- Move Over, Darling (1963) as Ranking Seaman (uncredited)
- What a Way to Go! (1964) as Ned (uncredited)
- Gunsmoke (1964) (Season 9, Episode 33) "The Warden" as Trainey
- Peyton Place (1964–1969) as Norman Harrington
- Love American Style (1969) (Segment: "Love and Mother") as Paul
- Corky (1972) as Billy
- They Only Kill Their Masters (1972) as John
- Benji (1974) as Henry
- The Invasion of Carol Enders (1974) as Adam Reston
- Paper Moon (1974) as "Moze" Pray (13 episodes)
- Hawmps! (1976), as Uriah Tibbs
- Quincy M.E. (1977) as Paul Colby
- Hawaii Five-O (1977), as Dennis
- Fantasy Island (1978) (Episode: "The Funny Girl/Butch and Sundance")
- The Norseman (1978), as Rolf
- Crash (1978), as Mike Tagliarino
- The Love Boat (1979) (Season 3 Episode 12) as Rory Daniels
- Earthbound (1981), as Zef
- Liar's Moon (1982), as Alex Peterson
- Manhattan Baby (1982), as Professor George Hacker
- 1990: The Bronx Warriors (1982), as Hot Dog
- The Atlantis Interceptors (1983), as Mike Ross
- Airwolf (1984), as St. John Hawke
- Jungle Raiders (1985), as Captain Yankee
- Foxtrap (1986), as J.T.
- The Mines of Kilimanjaro (1986), as Professor Thomas Smith / Schmidt
- Operation Nam (1986), as Roger Carson
- The Messenger (1986), as FBI Agent Parker
- Strike Commando (1987), as Colonel Radek
- Django 2 (1987), as "El Diablo" Orlowsky
- Night of the Sharks (1988), as Father Mattia (final film role)
