= Maggie Hall =

American west pioneer

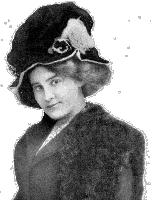
- Maggie Hall
- Born: 26 December 1853; Darwin, Lancashire, England, United Kingdom of Great Britain and Ireland
- Died: 17 January 1888 (aged 34); Murray, Idaho, U.S.
- Other names: Molly Burdan, Molly B'Damn
- Occupations: Prostitute, brothel madam

Maggie Hall (26 December 1853 – 17 January 1888) was a prostitute and brothel madam in the early history of Murray, Idaho, originally from Dublin, Ireland. In local lore she is known as a "Prostitute with a heart of gold" and the "Patron Saint of Murray".

== Biography ==
Maggie Hall was born in Darwen, Lancashire, England, to an Irish father and mother, both of whom were well educated. They ensured their daughter also gained an education, and young Maggie could recite Shakespeare, Dante and John Milton.

The Hall family were tailors, and Thomas Hall moved his family to Manchester in hopes of growing his business. Unfortunately, his investments failed and he fell into debt. Maggie and her sisters - Mary, Bridget and Louisa - would have to find work or marry. Maggie, instead, sailed for America to seek her fortune.

She arrived in New York City in 1870, according to the census taken in New York Harbor. Once there, she started working as a barmaid. Soon, however, she met a wealthy young man named Berdan, and they agreed to wed. Maggie wanted a Catholic wedding, but Berdan wanted to get married immediately, and woke a city official who promptly married them. Berdan thought Maggie too common a name for the wife of a man of wealth and position, so she changed her name to Mollie, which was a popular woman's name in the 1870s. The marriage was kept a secret from Berdan's father, out of fear that he would disapprove and withdraw the generous monthly allowance he gave his son. The father did eventually find out, and cut Berdan off.

=== Prostitution ===
Without any income, and now in debt, Berdan tried to talk his wife into prostitution. She eventually, and reluctantly, agreed. Feeling guilt for her actions, she went to receive the Confession, but instead of receiving forgiveness, she was excommunicated from the Catholic Church. This event may have caused her distress, as she appeared to be dedicated to her Catholic faith, as evidenced by her gifts to churches.

With her husband making more demands on her, and her love for him fading, Hall left her husband around 1877, determined to work solely for her own benefit. She travelled to Chicago, Virginia City, Nevada, San Francisco and Portland, Oregon, increasing the amount she charged for services as she went. At one stage she was reputed to be the mistress of a millionaire Charles Burchard. Burchard - who owned the building Mollie lived in - came to her aid after a fire in her apartment, and provided her with a new wardrobe. They reportedly began a May/ December romance. During this time she built up an expensive wardrobe as Mr. Burchard was generous. He bought Mollie a trotting race horse named Maggie and a racehorse for himself named BG Burchard. Burchard was working on building the pedestal for the statue of Liberty in New York Harbor and Mollie was privy to the models and sculptures as they were developed.

=== Murray ===
In 1884, after hearing about the gold strikes in the Coeur d'Alene Mountains, she headed to Idaho. While en route, travelling by train, she met Calamity Jane, although their paths diverged at Thompson Falls, Montana.

A potentially apocryphal tale relates that Hall obtained a horse and joined a pack train heading to Murray, Idaho. The pack train encountered a blizzard while travelling through Thompson Pass. She noticed a woman and child struggling in the snow, and decided to care for them, helping them and finding shelter for the night while the train carried on its journey. Mollie made it to Murray, with woman and child in tow, a day after the rest of the pack train had arrived; word of her actions spread and her heroic actions were much admired by the townsfolk.

In Murray, Hall met a man named Philip O'Rourke and the two became longtime friends. O'Rourke helped her to find a cabin in Paradise Row where she set up a brothel. Hall gained the nickname Molly B'Damn in Murray. In some accounts, this originated from O'Rourke mishearing her when she told him her married name: Molly Berdan. In other accounts, she gained the nickname from her colorful language.

On miners' payday, legend has it that Hall would fill a bathtub with water in the alley behind the brothel and invite miners to throw gold dust in it. When enough had been thrown in, she would strip off and bathe in the tub. For extra gold dust, the miners could help wash her.

Hall was known for her kindness and charity, gaining a reputation for aiding the hungry and homeless, and helping nurse the sick. While tales differ as to the cause of her death, legend suggests that Mollie attempted to caring for patients sick with some sort of communicable illness, and succumbed to the disease.

=== Death ===
Tombstone inscription

Sacred
To The Memory Of
Maggie Hall
Molly-B-Dam
Died At Murray
Jan. 17 1888
Age 35 Years
IHS

Hall contracted tuberculosis in October 1887 and died on 17 January 1888, aged 34. O'Rourke was at her bedside. The community pulled all their curtains shut and the bars, gambling dens and surrounding mines shut down for her funeral. The service was given by a Methodist minister as the Catholic priest refused. At her own request she was buried as Maggie Hall in Murray Cemetery. Her tombstone erroneously gives her age as 35.

== Legacy ==
Hall's legendary compassion led the citizens of Murray to name their annual city celebration the "Molly B'Damn Gold Rush Days" in her honor. They have trouble casting the role of Molly B'Damn as there are no proven photographs of her. The Sprag Pole Museum located in Murray features a reconstruction of her bedroom as one of the exhibits.

In the 1973 film The Brothers O'Toole, the residents of the small Colorado town of Molybdenum consistently mispronounce it as "Molly B'Damn".
