= Patsy Garrett =

American actress and singer (1921–2015)

- Garrett in Nanny and the Professor, 1969
- Born: Virginia Garrett; May 4, 1921; Atlantic City, New Jersey, U.S.
- Died: January 8, 2015 (aged 93); Indio, California, U.S.
- Occupations: Actress, singer
- Years active: 1928–2014
- Awards: Young Artist Former Child Star "Lifetime Achievement" Award

Virginia "Patsy" Garrett (May 4, 1921 – January 8, 2015) was an American actress and singer. Beginning her career as a radio performer at the age of seven, Garrett is best known for her seven years on Fred Waring's Pleasure Time radio show during the 1940s, as well as for her recurring television and film roles; as nosy neighbor Mrs. Florence Fowler on Nanny and the Professor (1970–1971), school secretary Miss Hogarth on Room 222 (1972–1973), as Mary Gruber in the Benji series of motion pictures beginning in 1974, and as a commercial spokesperson for Purina Cat Chow cat food.

== Career ==
Active on stage, screen and television beginning with a dance recital at age four, Garrett had her own children's radio show in Richmond, Virginia by age seven. At the age of seventeen, Garrett was a regular on Fred Waring's national radio show "Pleasure Time" as a comic singer from 1938 to 1945. During this time, she was approached by Cole Porter to promote a ballad ("Begin the Beguine") which he had written for a new musical. In 1981, Garrett was honored by the Young Artist Foundation with its Former Child Star "Lifetime Achievement" Award recognizing her achievements within the entertainment industry as a child actress and singer.

In the late 1960s, Garrett provided cartoon voiceovers for a number of Hanna-Barbera projects, including The Banana Splits Adventure Hour. A small part as the mayor's wife in a 1969 Elvis Presley movie, The Trouble with Girls, reportedly led to a lifelong friendship with the singer. While working on the film, Garrett frequently baked cookies for the cast. Presley's schedule usually meant his arriving late on the set, which in turn meant that he missed out on the treats. Garrett baked him a special batch which he brought with him to Las Vegas where he was scheduled to perform. As she was passing through Las Vegas, Garrett reportedly phoned Presley not for tickets, but for the return of her baking tin.

U.S. television audiences of the 1970s may remember Garrett for another recurring role in a series of commercial messages as the "Purina Cat Chow Lady." A post-production trick involving the controlled forward motion and reversal of the film had Garrett dancing the "chow-chow-chow" with a cat in a good-humored parody of the cha-cha-cha.

== Later years ==
In 2000, the TV Land cable television channel aired the original Purina commercials as part of their "Retromercials" series of fondly remembered national television ads of the past. On November 28, 2004, California's Desert Theater League awarded Garrett its lifetime achievement award. She continued to appear in local theater productions in and around the Palm Springs, California, area. She died on January 8, 2015, after a brief illness.

== Filmography ==
Year	Title	Role	Notes
1962	The Chapman Report	Older Married Woman	Uncredited
1964	Dear Heart	Millicent	Uncredited
1967	Divorce American Style	Phoebe	Uncredited
1969	The Trouble with Girls	Mrs. Gilchrist	
1973	Wicked, Wicked	Mrs. Griswald - Housekeeper	
1974	The Parallax View	Woman #1	
1974	Benji	Mary	
1977	For the Love of Benji	Mary	
1991	Mississippi Masala	Shop-at-Home Anchor Person 2	(final film role)
