= Nick Whitaker =

American actor (born 1988)

- Born: Nick Whitaker; October 1, 1988 (age 37); Salt Lake City, Utah, U.S.
- Occupation: Actor
- Years active: 2000–2009
- Children: 1
- Website: http://www.nickwhitaker.info/

Nick Whitaker (born October 1, 1988) is an American actor who is known for playing the lead role in Benji: Off the Leash!.

== Career ==
Whitaker's first role was a Chase Patterson in Message in a Cell Phone. He is an active member of the Church of Jesus Christ of Latter-day Saints and has appeared in many church related movies which include starring as Joseph Smith in the major film from the LDS Motion Picture Studios, Joseph Smith: The Prophet of the Restoration, which is currently playing at the Joseph Smith Memorial Building and various visitor centres across the world. He has also appeared in Brigham City, Money or The Mission, and the children's film Bug Off.

Whitaker has also appeared in the Disney Channel movies High School Musical and Read It and Weep, and he had a minor role as one of the basketball players in Hatching Pete.

In Read It and Weep he plays Lenny Bartlett, the older brother of Jamie Bartlett, who is the main character. In the movie he sings the song "I Will Be Around".

== Filmography ==
Filmography
Year	Title	Role	Notes
2000	Message in a Cell Phone	Chase	
2001	Brigham City	Spencer	
2001	Bug Off!	Jeff	
2002	Journey to Harmony	Kid #2	
2001-2002	Touched by an Angel	Tommy/Willie	
2004	Benji: Off the Leash!	Colby	
2005	Joseph Smith: Prophet of the Restoration	Joseph Smith - ages 14–17 years	
2006	High School Musical	Alan	
2006	Read It and Weep	Lenny Bartlett	
2006	Money or Mission	Patrick Gill	
2008	High School Musical 3: Senior Year	Spring Musical Guitar Player	
2009	Hatching Pete	Floyd	uncredited
