= Oh! Heavenly Dog =

1980 film by Joe Camp

- Theatrical release poster
- Directed by: Joe Camp
- Written by: Rod Browning; Joe Camp
- Produced by: Joe Camp
- Starring: Chevy Chase; Benji; Jane Seymour; Omar Sharif; Robert Morley; Alan Sues; Donnelly Rhodes
- Cinematography: Don Reddy
- Edited by: Steve R. Moore; Leon Seith
- Music by: Euel Box; Frank Denson; Wings (song "Arrow Through Me"); Elton John (songs "Song For Guy" and "Return To Paradise")
- Production company: Mulberry Square Productions
- Distributed by: 20th Century Fox
- Release date: July 11, 1980
- Running time: 104 minutes
- Country: United States
- Language: English
- Budget: $6 million
- Box office: $6.2 million (domestic)

Oh! Heavenly Dog is a 1980 American fantasy comedy film written by Rod Browning and directed by Joe Camp, their third collaboration in films featuring the dog Benji and stars Chevy Chase as a private investigator who is reincarnated as a dog to solve his own murder. Jane Seymour and Omar Sharif co-star in the film, released by 20th Century-Fox. The screenplay was based loosely on the 1951 film You Never Can Tell starring Dick Powell.

The film was a box office disappointment, grossing roughly its production costs, and earned negative reviews.

== Plot ==
Private investigator Benjamin Browning is dropped off by his friend, Freddie, on a rainy day in London. Browning collides with writer Jackie Howard and asks her for a date. She tells him to contact her after her return from Paris. Quimby Charles comes to Benjamin's office while his secretary Margaret is at lunch, claiming to be a member of Parliament, and requesting Benjamin as a bodyguard for a friend, Mrs. Patricia Elliot. Swayed by a large offer of payment, Benjamin accepts and goes to Patricia's flat to find the door unlocked. Patricia is on the bedroom floor, dead from a knife wound. An intruder stabs Benjamin, steals Patricia's gold pendant, and leaves.

Benjamin awakens at an "intermediate destination evaluation facility" in the afterlife, where a counselor named Mr. Higgins informs Benjamin he is dead. Before Benjamin can enter heaven or hell, he must return to life and solve his own murder, as Browning the dog. Benjamin returns to London to search for his killer, but is thrown out of Carlton Court, the building where he was murdered. Freddie, who has been reincarnated as a cat after being killed in an automobile collision, directs Benjamin to Patricia's flat. He searches for clues there, while Malcolm Bart, the man who impersonated Quimby, watches from a closet. Browning dials a telephone number recently added to Patricia's calendar, and the Needham Gallery answers. When the building manager threatens Jackie about notifying Scotland Yard about the presence of a dog, Browning leaves.

Margaret is cleaning out Benjamin's office when Jackie asks to interview her about the crime for a book she is writing, sees his photo, and realizes it was him who asked for a date. Jackie mentions she lives at the Stanley Towers and Browning follows her there. Jackie interviews Quimby at Scotland Yard, who insists on access to her research, which he hopes will clear his name as a suspect. Jackie also visits the Needham Gallery, leaving Browning in her parked car, and meets Montanero, whose artwork Patricia used in her interior designs. Jackie invites him to her flat for dinner. Jackie is introduced to Alistair Becket (John Stride), an up-and-coming candidate for prime minister, who shows great interest in her book. Browning searches the gallery, and sees Jackie talking to Bart, the killer. At the sight of the dog on Jackie's lap, Bart becomes nervous and leaves. Browning wiggles free from Jackie's grasp and follows Bart.

Jackie later asks for Patricia's client list, but her building manager refuses. Later still, Jackie interviews Becket, and asks his help to gain access to Patricia's flat. He then summons Bart, his assistant. While the men talk with Jackie, a painting of the Swiss Alps hanging in Becket's office reminds Browning that Patricia vacationed there, and he suspects a connection. Later in Patricia's flat, Browning sees Bart remove evidence. Suddenly, Mr. Higgins appears, and temporarily switches the dog back to his human form to warn him that a mistake was made. His dog body will expire sooner than expected, and he will have to leave before he solves his murder. Benjamin protests, and says he will not leave before the crime is solved.

Meanwhile, Becket alerts Jackie that her dog was found by building security, and is being held in Bart's office. Browning sees a calendar entry on Bart's desk, noting Becket's birthday and a street address. When Jackie notices the entry, she wishes Becket a happy birthday. However, he says that his birthday is March 3, not October, and casually invites her to lunch. Browning soon investigates the address, which is a post office, and decides to search postal box no. thirty-three, based on the numerals of Becket's birthday. Browning grabs a letter out of the box and escapes. At Jackie's apartment, Browning rips open the envelope to find Patricia's pendant with the word "ALP" stamped on the back. Upon realizing the letters stand for "Alistair loves Patricia", Browning searches Jackie's police photographs and notices that Patricia was no longer wearing the pendant. He deduces that Patricia became a political liability for the married Becket once he intended to run for prime minister, and she became engaged to his rival, Quimby. Therefore, Becket and Bart schemed to get rid of her. Browning grabs the pendant in his mouth and heads to Jackie's lunch date. However, Bart chases him until Browning runs into an alley. There, Browning transforms into human form, and Mr. Higgins appears, saying Benjamin's time on Earth is over. Bart is shaken to see Benjamin, and leaves after the dog is nowhere to be found.

Meanwhile, Benjamin will not cooperate with Higgins, and shows up at the restaurant as Browning with the pendant in his mouth. Becket takes the pendant from Jackie and accuses her of derailing his plan to become prime minister. Browning turns on Jackie's tape recorder just as Becket confesses his love for Patricia. When Jackie accuses Becket of murder, Bart appears and confesses to the crime. After twelve years preparing Becket to become prime minister, Bart did not want Patricia to ruin their political ambitions. Bart tries to shoot Browning but hits Jackie instead as she sacrifices herself to protect the dog. Bart is arrested but Browning is heartbroken by Jackie's death, until he's reunited with her when she returns to Earth as a cat.

== Cast ==
- Chevy Chase as Benjamin Browning / Benji (voice)
- Benjean as Benji
- Jane Seymour as Jackie Howard
- Omar Sharif as Malcolm Bart
- Robert Morley as Bernie
- Stuart Germain as Mr. Higgins / Deaf Postie
- Alan Sues as Freddie
- John Stride as Alistair Becket
- Donnelly Rhodes as Montanero
- Barbara Leigh-Hunt as Margaret
- Richard Vernon as Quimby Charles
- Frank Williams as Mr. Easton
- Albin Pahernik as Pelican Man
- Susan Kellermann as German Clerk
- Lorenzo Music as Carlton
- Margierite Corriveau as Patricia Elliot
- Harry Hill as Jeffrey Edgeware
- Gerald Iles as Patricia's Doorman
- Jérôme Tiberghien as Taxi Driver
- Kay Tremblay as Lady Hermione

== Production ==
Chase later said Camp "came to me with a script that I thought was very funny. I said yes, did it and left after six weeks." The featured dog is Benjean, billed here as Benji. She was the daughter of the dog Higgins who originated the character Benji.

The film was shot in London, Paris and Montreal. Because of England's quarantine laws – which required dogs to be in quarantine for six months – the scenes with Benji were shot in Montreal's old city.

Chase says after he left Camp "shot the rest of the scenes with the dog and changed all the lines. I had to come back, go onto the looping stage and loop completely different dialogue than I had read in the script. It was very infuriating; I was so upset that to this day I have never actually seen the movie."

== Behind the scenes ==
Outtakes and behind-the-scenes footage from this film were used in making the short feature Benji at Work (1980), a 30-minute documentary about the career of Benjean as a dog actor.

== Reception ==
In his one-star review, critic Roger Ebert of The Chicago Sun-Times stated Oh! Heavenly Dog was a "total miscalculation from beginning to end" and furthermore was the type of "smarmy" production Chase might have lampooned as a performer on Saturday Night Live. He also suggested the film might have been salvaged had the filmmakers "used imagination in exploring the fantasy of a man in a dog's body", but they instead went for obvious jokes based around a dog trained to do simple tricks. Janet Maslin called it a film that "Shows few signs of life, and many signs of depressing modernism".

== See also ==
- List of films about angels
- You Never Can Tell (1951 film)
- Fluke (1995 film)
- Quigley (2003 film)
- A Dog's Purpose (2017 film)
