= Hawmps! =

1976 film

- Original theatrical poster
- Directed by: Joe Camp
- Written by: William Bickley; Joe Camp; Michael Warren
- Produced by: Joe Camp
- Starring: James Hampton; Christopher Connelly; Slim Pickens; Denver Pyle; Gene Conforti; Mimi Maynard; Jack Elam; Lee de Broux; Herb Vigran; Dick Drake; Larry Swartz; Mike Travis; Tiny Wells; Jesse Davis
- Music by: Euel Box
- Distributed by: Mulberry Square Releasing
- Release date: May 21, 1976
- Running time: 113 minutes
- Language: English
- Budget: $5.35 million

Hawmps! is a 1976 American Western slapstick comedy film inspired by the United States Camel Corps, an experiment during the 1850s and '60s by United States Cavalry to introduce camels into service in the western United States, specifically Texas. The cast included James Hampton, Christopher Connelly and Slim Pickens.

The film was produced by Mulberry Square productions and directed by Joe Camp, who co-wrote the script with William Bickley, and Michael Warren.

== Plot ==
Howard Clemmons tells his grandchildren about his adventures as a young U.S. Cavalry lieutenant in 1854. Clemmons had no seniority, power or talent for the army and was therefore chosen to lead an experimental project using camels as cavalry mounts in the southwest U.S. Clemmons remembers arriving at Fort Val Verde, Texas, where Sergeant Uriah Tibbs is expecting Arabian horses. When Tibbs explains that he and his men competed for the privilege of being in the project, Clemmons declines to tell him the "Arabians" are actually camels. Clemmons then reports to the disinterested fort commander, Colonel Seymour Hawkins. Clemmons inspects the troops, including Nathaniel R. Higgins, who informs Clemmons that he re-enlisted so he could ride an Arabian horse. When Clemmons and Tibbs later discuss the project at the saloon, they are accosted by Sergeant Naman Tucker, who is outraged his troopers did not receive the horses. A drunken Clemmons slides under the table as the two sergeants fight.

The next day, the camels arrive, but the troops ride their horses back to the fort in disgust, leaving Clemmons to deal with the camels. Hi Jolly, an Arab camel trainer, reports to Clemmons and as they herd camels through town, horses stampede in fright, ladies scream and dogs bark in fear. A wagon overturns, and a barrel splits open covering Colonel Hawkins's daughter, Jennifer, in molasses. Hawkins berates Clemmons for the damage and plans to cancel the project, but Clemmons declares that the orders came from Jefferson Davis, the secretary of war. That night, Jennifer sneaks into Clemmons's room and pours molasses over his head. The next day, Hi Jolly gives his first lesson in camel care as Tucker rides up and insults Tibbs's men. Clemmons warns Tucker that if he insults the camel corps again, Clemmons will put him on report and transfer him into the camel project. To the cheers of Tibbs's men, Tucker apologizes and rides away. Over time, the soldiers continue their camel training, but the lessons do not go well. When the men finally learn to mount the camels, the animals run wild. That night, the men bet Tucker he cannot lasso a camel. When Tucker lands the rope around the camel's neck, it runs in panic, dragging Tucker behind. The next morning, the camel returns, still dragging Tucker, bleeding and bruised.

As weeks pass, the men become proficient with their camels and Clemmons romances Jennifer. He is ordered to capture a Native American renegade and Clemmons and his men pursue the outlaws, but they are thrown off their camels at a river. Later, Hi Jolly explains that camels are afraid of water; if Clemmons had dismounted and demonstrated the water was shallow, the camels would have crossed. That night, Jennifer takes a stroll with Clemmons, who tells her Colonel Hawkins is cancelling the camel project. When Clemmons says he is a failure, Jennifer scolds him for being too cowardly to fight for his career.

The next morning, Clemmons proposes a 300-mile (483-km) race to the town of Dos Rios between his camels and Tucker's horses. When Hawkins declines, Clemmons deceitfully claims that the camel experiment is the president's pet project. Sometime later, Hi Jolly is injured in a barroom brawl and cannot ride. Before the race, Jennifer gives Clemmons a thick book on camels and kisses him. Hawkins fires a cannon and the race is on. Tucker's horses outpace Clemmons's camels, but within a few days, Clemmons's men catch up. However, Clemmons learns from Corporal Leroy that Tucker and his men were captured by an outlaw named Bad Jack Cutter at Dagger Flats. Clemmons insists on rescuing Tucker and his men. Along the way, Clemmons and Tibbs capture two other outlaws, steal their clothes and horses, then ride into town in disguise to meet Bad Jack, agreeing to join his gang. Later, they find Tucker and his men in jail and try to pull out the window bars using a horse. When the horse fails, a camel demolishes the entire jail. Tucker and his men run, leaving Tibbs and Clemmons to face the outlaws alone. A gunfight ensues but Clemmons's men ride in on camelback, rescuing their leaders, and ride off before the outlaws can get to their horses. That night, Clemmons discovers they have lost the camel carrying their water barrels. Although Clemmons believes they can find water in the mountains, Tibbs insists they follow the map to the next waterhole. After two days of riding, they discover the hole is dry, and they are out of water. Tibbs wants to ride back to a river, but Clemmons convinces Tibbs to let him try to reach the mountains, ordering Tibbs to head to the river if he does not return by sunset. Clemmons finds water, but as he ties the barrel onto his camel, a shot rings out. Bad Jack exchanges gunfire with Clemmons as the camel runs away. After sundown, the camel reaches Tibbs and his men. The men drink, then realize Clemmons is missing. The next morning, Bad Jack realizes Clemmons is out of ammunition. He climbs down the rocks and shoots Clemmons in the chest but as he celebrates, Tibbs and the men capture him. Much to Tibbs's surprise, Clemmons is saved by the book Jennifer gave him; it was inside his jacket and stopped Bad Jack's bullet.

Later, Clemmons's troop races past Tucker and his men's exhausted horses outside Dos Rios. As Clemmons celebrates his victory, a telegram arrives from Washington, D.C., reporting that Congress has approved construction of the transcontinental railroad and the camel project is therefore unnecessary. Clemmons is ordered to turn the camels loose, but Tibbs and the men protest, concerned that the camels will perish in the American desert. As Clemmons finishes telling the story to his grandchildren, his wife, Jennifer, announces that dinner is ready. Clemmons goes outside to ring the dinner triangle, but Hi Jolly, Higgins and Tibbs report that one of the camels is in labor. As the four old men walk to the barn, Higgins wonders if they could move the camels closer to the house because he is tired that "each day he must walk a mile for a camel".

== Cast ==
- James Hampton as Lieutenant Howard Clemmons
- Christopher Connelly as Sergeant Uriah Tibbs
- Slim Pickens as Sergeant Naman Tucker
- Denver Pyle as Colonel Seymour Hawkins
- Gene Conforti as Hi Jolly
- Mimi Maynard as Jennifer Hawkins
- Jack Elam as Bad Jack Cutter
- Lee de Broux as Fitzgerald
- Herb Vigran as Smitty
- Jesse Davis as Mariachi Singer
- Frank Inn as Frank the Cook
- Larry Swartz as Corporal LeRoy
- Mike Travis as Arthur Logan
- Tiny Wells as Nathaniel R. Higgins
- Dick Drake as Drake
- Henry Kendrick as Colonel Randolph Zachary
- Don Starr as Major Bill Haney
- Roy Gunsberg as Old Howard Clemmons
- Cynthia Smith as Granddaughter
- Rex Janssen as Grandson
- Catherine Hearne as Zelda
- Larry Strawbridge as Mayor of Dos Rios
- James Weir as Private
- Alvin Wright as Crazy Feathers
- Lee Tiplitsky as Drunk
- Joe Camp III as Telegraph Boy
- Perry Martin as Frontiersman
- Sheba as Herself
- Valentine as Herself
- Richard Lundin as Stage Driver
- Charles Starkey as Man
- Benjoe as Benji
- Tiffany as Herself
- Robert Elliott as Horse Soldier 1
- Chris Frey as Horse Soldier 2
- Raymond Kochel as Horse Soldier 3
- Bo Spafford as Horse Soldier 4
- Jim Spahn as Horse Soldier 5
- Bud Stout as Horse Soldier 6
- Dale Walker as Horse Soldier 7

== See also ==
- Camel cavalry
- Hi Jolly
