= For the Love of Benji =

1977 film by Joe Camp

- Theatrical release poster
- Directed by: Joe Camp
- Written by: Joe Camp; Ben Vaughn
- Produced by: Ben Vaughn
- Starring: Benjean; Patsy Garrett; Cynthia Smith; Allen Fiuzat; Ed Nelson; Peter Bowles; Art Vasil; Bridget Armstrong
- Music by: Betty Box; Euel Box
- Distributed by: Mulberry Square Releasing
- Release date: June 10, 1977
- Running time: 85 minutes
- Country: United States
- Language: English
- Box office: $22,257,624 or $5 million

For the Love of Benji is a 1977 family film, directed and written by Joe Camp. It is the sequel to the original film, featuring Benji, and the second film in the Benji series, released on June 10, 1977. It is the first Benji film to star Benjean, Higgins' daughter.

== Plot ==
In Athens, Greece, a secret agent named Stelios goes to an outdoor café, where the waiter gives him newspapers and a package. The newspapers reveal that a German scientist has been declared missing in Greece, and the package contains a photo of the dog Benji with his human family, the Chapmans. Meanwhile, in the U.S., the Chapmans arrive at an airport, en route to the island of Crete in Greece. The children, Paul and Cindy, worry about their dogs, Benji and Tiffany, as they are placed in travel carriers. Cindy tells the airline representative that Tiffany has a “condition”. While waiting to check in, Mary, the Chapmans' housekeeper, discovers that the man behind her in line, Chandler Dietrich, is also headed to Crete. Dietrich then infiltrates the employee-only luggage area, snatches Benji's carrier off a conveyor belt, drugs the dog, and imprints a code on his paw. Upon arrival in Crete, Dietrich befriends Mary, while the family learns that Benji and Tiffany missed the connecting flight from Athens.

When a luggage room worker at the Athens airport unlocks Benji's carrier, he and a British couple, Ronald and Elizabeth, pursue the escaping dog. After escaping from several cars in the city, Benji retreats into ancient ruins, encountering a stray dog unwilling to share a bone he is gnawing on. Back in the streets, he purloins sausages from a marketplace, utilizing them to befriend the stray dog upon his return.

The next day, Benji is detained by police upon returning to the marketplace, but Ronald and Elizabeth claim him and take him to their home. After Elizabeth stalls and dismisses Stelios, who is posing as a representative of Olympic Airways, Mary later arrives and inquires about Benji, who hears her voice from upstairs. As she departs, Benji barks at Mary from the window to obtain her attention, but a passing truck forces him to pursue her taxi. Wandering to a hotel, he spots Mary, Paul, and Cindy, but escapes upon noticing Dietrich, who tracks him to the ruins after procuring a Doberman. Sometime later, Benji is nourished by a butcher and later awakened from his subsequent slumber in the butcher's shop by the barking Doberman. When Dietrich enters the premises, Benji escapes from a nearby cupboard.

After spending the night in the ruins, Benji locates his family's hotel, but the doorman ejects him. Returning to the butcher's shop, Benji sees his friend conversing with Stelios, but is abducted by Dietrich at gunpoint. Stelios and the butcher respond by releasing the restrained Doberman to find Dietrich and Benji. As the Doberman tackles Dietrich, Benji escapes to the ruins, while the stray dog frightens the Doberman away. Benji then sneaks inside the hotel on a luggage cart, and reunites with his family. However, Stelios arrives to announce that Benji must be taken away for a few days. Before Stelios can explain further, Dietrich clubs him over the head with a gun and reveals that Benji holds the key to vital information, instructing Mary to call the police and hold Stelios at gunpoint. Stelios awakens and tells a reluctant Mary that the real Dietrich was found murdered in New Jersey and is being impersonated, explaining that as a real secret agent, he must rescue a top scientist to preserve an important project.

Meanwhile, the man impersonating Dietrich takes Benji to a yacht, where Ronald and Elizabeth are waiting. When the couple accuses the impostor of trying to double-cross them, he knocks them unconscious. As Benji escapes, the impostor Dietrich pursues the dog back to the hotel, which is now surrounded by police. Noticing the impostor holding Cindy at gunpoint in the car, Benji rushes at the man, knocks the gun to the ground, and rescues Cindy, as the police arrest the impostor. Sometime later, while Paul and Cindy play with Benji on a beach, Stelios explains to Mary that the impostor Dietrich used Benji to smuggle the coordinates for a meeting with a German scientist, who had created a formula for multiplying a barrel of oil; the charlatan aimed to steal the formula and then sell it to the highest bidder. Benji proudly looks upon a basket of puppies, revealing that Tiffany had been pregnant.

== Cast ==
- Benjean as Benji
- Patsy Garrett as Mary
- Cynthia Smith as Cindy Chapman
- Allen Fiuzat as Paul Chapman
- Tiffany as White Dog
- Ed Nelson as Chandler Dietrich
- Peter Bowles as Ronald
- Art Vasil as Stelios
- Bridget Armstrong as Elizabeth

== Reception ==
Film critic Lawrence Van Gelder of The New York Times finds the movie to be the adventures of Benji in Athens. He states: "As dog stars go, Benji can cock his head with the best of them".

Metacritic, which uses a weighted average, assigned the film a score of 46 out of 100, based on 5 critics, indicating "mixed or average" reviews.
