= Mooch Goes to Hollywood =

- DVD cover
- Written by: Jim Backus; Jerry Devine
- Directed by: Richard Erdman
- Starring: Vincent Price; James Darren; Jill St. John
- Narrated by: Richard Burton; Zsa Zsa Gabor
- Country of origin: United States
- Original language: English

Production
- Cinematography: Allen Daviau
- Editor: Larry Heath
- Running time: 51 minutes
- Production company: Jim Backus–Jerry Devine Productions

Original release
- Release: 1971

Mooch Goes to Hollywood (aka Mooch) is a 1971 51-minute television film directed by Richard Erdman and co-written by Jim Backus, who also stars in the film as himself. The film chronicles the adventures of Mooch, an ambitious dog, and her attempts to become a canine star after befriending Zsa Zsa Gabor.

== Plot ==
Mooch, a young canine starlet, sets off for Hollywood. After befriending Zsa Zsa Gabor, her new friend provides the pooch with the "skinny" on the ins and outs of achieving Hollywood fame. Wandering through the famous haunts of tinseltown, Mooch comes across Vincent Price at the Brown Derby and ends up in his Jeep. Price wants to give the dog to a young admirer and takes Mooch to a veterinarian for a check-up. When her new owner leaves, Mooch is frightened by Dr. Hackett and bolts for the door, but is not able to catch up with Price driving away.

After checking out the psychedelic scene where she meets Phyllis Diller, her wandering takes Mooch to Dino's Lounge on Sunset Strip in West Hollywood and then to the Playboy Club in downtown Los Angeles. Rejected as a Playboy bunny, but still on the lookout for famous haunts, Mooch discovers Michaelangelo's Wigs where she has visions of a glamorous new look. Continuing on past the Classic Cat Club, Mooch encounters James Darren at an outdoor garage, and feigns an injury to get his attention. On a trip to the seashore, new adventures await with new friends. Hoping to land a contract, Mooch tags along with two girls being discovered by a producer Jerry Hausner. Ending up back at the veterinarian, Mooch joins a wild menagerie of animals waiting for Dr. Hackett.

Placed in the veterinarian's kennel, Mooch makes her escape and heads for Paragon Studios. On her tour of the back lots, famous catch phrases waft through the air. After interrupting a wild west shooting scene, Mooch sneaks into the dressing room of Jill St. John. Taking her turn in the hairdresser's chair, the young starlet finds her way to a recording session with Jim Backus, playing Mr. Magoo, who needs a dog for an upcoming production. He becomes her next master, taking Mooch home to meet his wife Henny, and the many friends arriving for a garden party, including all of Mooch's former owners.

Finally making one last attempt at achieving stardom, Mooch checks out a Hollywood estate and jumps aboard the owner's car. It turns out to be Dr. Hackett, who ultimately adopts the stray.

== Cast ==
- Higgins the Dog as Mooch
- Vincent Price as himself
- James Darren as himself
- Jill St. John as herself
- Jim Backus as himself
- James Harding as Veterinarian Dr. Hackett
- Kim Hamilton as Nurse
- Gino Conforti as Hairdresser Mr. Oz
- Jerry Hausner as Producer
- Bert Holland as Attendant
- Grace Albertson as Lady with Cat
- Jay Jostyn as man with Duck
- Lynne Lipton as voice of Mooch
- Zsa Zsa Gabor as narrator

== Production ==
Mooch is played by Higgins the Dog, best known for his roles as "Dog" in the television series Petticoat Junction and as the title character in Benji. Mooch Goes to Hollywood is narrated by Richard Burton, who co-starred with Backus in the 1959 cinematic adaptation of Edna Ferber's Ice Palace. Later narration is by Zsa Zsa Gabor, Mooch's mentor and friend.

The film features cameos from many of the top film and television stars of the era, who appear as themselves. This includes Vincent Price, James Darren, Jill St. John, Phyllis Diller, Sam Jaffe, Rose Marie, Dick Martin, Darren McGavin, Edward G. Robinson, Cesar Romero, Dean Martin (voice only) and Mickey Rooney.

The animals that appeared in Mooch Goes to Hollywood were supplied and trained by Frank Inn. The bevy of animals at the veterinarian included a monkey, goat, cat, donkey and duck. Mooch's various costumes came from Frederick's of Hollywood. The title song, with lyrics by Ann Nicolaysen was sung by Sonny Curtis.

== Reception ==
Mooch Goes to Hollywood was considered "family-friendly" fare and with so many cameo appearances was likely to gain an audience with adults as well as children. Reviews, however, were not kind. Film critic Leonard Maltin slated the film, lamenting films of the 1970s where Vincent Price was being given "fewer good parts" and often appeared on television, "even spoof[ing] his own image". Publisher John Soltes went even further in describing Mooch Goes to Hollywood as "one of those unfortunate resume bullets for Zsa Zsa Gabor, James Darren, Vincent Price, Jill St. John, Jim Backus and Mickey Rooney. The 51-minute television special from 1971 is a pointless exercise in dull family entertainment. It provides some laughs, but always for unintended reasons."

== Legacy ==
Nearly 50 years after its initial TV airing, Mooch Goes to Hollywood received its theatrical world premiere at Beyond Fest on October 2, 2019, held at the Egyptian Theatre in Hollywood. All three sold-out screenings were presented on 16mm and featured an introduction by American Cinematheque programmer and "Moochologist" Grant Moninger.
