= Richard Erdman =

American actor (1925–2019)

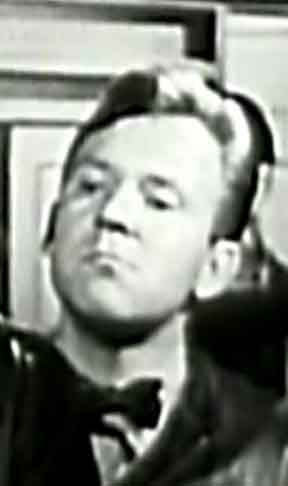
- Erdman in The Admiral Was a Lady (1950)
- Born: John Richard Erdman; June 1, 1925; Enid, Oklahoma, U.S.
- Died: March 16, 2019 (aged 93); Los Angeles, California, U.S.
- Other name: Dick Erdman
- Occupations: Actor; director
- Years active: 1944–2017
- Known for: Community (2009–2015); Stalag 17 (1953); Tora! Tora! Tora! (1970)
- Spouses: Leza Holland (m. 1948; div. 1950); Sharon Randall (m. 1953; died 2016)
- Children: 1

John Richard Erdman (June 1, 1925 – March 16, 2019) was an American character actor and occasional film and television director. He appeared in more than 160 films and television productions between 1944 and 2017, mostly in supporting roles. He is most known for his roles in the classic films Stalag 17 (1953) and Tora! Tora! Tora! (1970). In his final years, Erdman found renewed fame through his portrayal of Leonard Rodriguez in the comedy series Community (2009–2015).

== Early life ==
John Richard Erdman was born on June 1, 1925, in Enid, Oklahoma, and grew up in Colorado Springs, Colorado. His father abandoned the family when he was a child. During his youth, he worked as a paper boy for the Colorado Springs Evening Telegraph. A stage director named Newton Winburne encouraged him to try his luck in Hollywood.

== Career ==
Two of Erdman's first roles were in the films Mr. Skeffington, starring Bette Davis and Claude Rains and Janie, starring Joyce Reynolds. After a few smaller roles he achieved success as a character actor in supporting roles. In a career that spanned seven decades, his best-known roles are that of the barracks chief Hoffy in Stalag 17, and the garrulous, tedious barfly McNulty in the Twilight Zone episode "A Kind of a Stopwatch". He also appeared in The Men (1950) with Marlon Brando and the film noir Cry Danger (1951) with Dick Powell and Rhonda Fleming. In Tora! Tora! Tora! (1970) he played Colonel Edward F. French, the officer who responded to the failure to transmit the warning to Pearl Harbor, Hawaii. In the CBS TV series Perry Mason he played murder victim Arthur Binney in the 1958 episode "The Case of the Gilded Lily". He later played the role of murderer three times in "The Case of the Absent Artist" (1962), "The Case of the Antic Angel" (1964), and "The Case of the Vanishing Victim" (1966).

He guest-starred in a wide variety of shows such as Alfred Hitchcock Presents; The Dick Van Dyke Show; Mayberry R.F.D.; The Man from U.N.C.L.E.; I Dream of Jeannie; The Beverly Hillbillies; Here's Lucy; That Girl; The Six Million Dollar Man; The Bionic Woman; One Day at a Time; Lou Grant; Quincy, M.E.; Cheers; and Murder, She Wrote.

He was also known as a voice artist, contributing to the animated shows, Scooby-Doo and Scrappy-Doo, The Amazing Spider-Man, Jonny Quest, DuckTales, Snorks, Paddington Bear, and Batman: The Animated Series.

He directed the 1971 TV film Mooch Goes to Hollywood. From 2009 to 2015, Erdman had a recurring role as the antagonistic and elderly community college student Leonard on Community. His last role was in 2017 in the sitcom Dr. Ken.

== Personal life ==
Erdman married actress Leza Holland in 1948, but they divorced two years later. He was married to his second wife, Sharon Randall, from 1953 until her death in 2016. They had one daughter, Erica, who was born in 1954 and died on February 18, 2010, of an accidental overdose of prescription medicine.

== Death ==
Erdman died on March 16, 2019, aged 93, in an assisted-living facility in Los Angeles, California. He had been suffering "from age-related dementia" and had recently had a fall.

== Filmography ==
=== Film ===
Year	Title	Role	Notes
1944	Mr. Skeffington	Western Union Boy	uncredited
1944	Janie	Scooper Nolan	
1944	Musical Movieland	Sailor with Tour	uncredited
1944	The Very Thought of You	Soda Jerk	
1944	Hollywood Canteen	Soldier on Deck	uncredited
1945	Objective, Burma!	Private Nebraska Hooper	
1945	The Horn Blows at Midnight	Joe Smith	scenes deleted
1945	Star in the Night	Cowboy	
1945	Danger Signal	Bunkie Taylor	
1945	Too Young to Know	Tommy	
1946	Janie Gets Married	Lieutenant 'Scooper' Nolan	
1946	Night and Day	Music Store Customer	uncredited
1946	Shadow of a Woman	Joe	
1946	So You Want to Play the Horses	Eddie	uncredited
1946	Deception	Jerry Spencer	uncredited
1946	Nobody Lives Forever	Bellboy, The Marwood Arms	
1947	That Way with Women	Eddie	
1947	Wild Harvest	Mark Lewis	
1948	The Time of Your Life	Willie (the pinball machine maniac)	
1949	Easy Living	Buddy Morgan	
1950	Swiss Tour	Eddy	
1950	The Men	Leo	
1950	The Admiral Was a Lady	Oliver 'Ollie' Bonelli	
1951	Cry Danger	Delong	
1951	You're in the Navy Now	Ensign Chuck Dorrance	
1951	The Stooge	Ben Bailey	
1951	The Wild Blue Yonder	Corporal Frenchy	
1952	Aladdin and His Lamp	Mirza	
1952	The San Francisco Story	Shorty	
1952	Jumping Jacks	Private Dogface Dolan	
1952	The Happy Time	Alfred Grattin	
1953	The Blue Gardenia	Al	
1953	Stalag 17	Sergeant 'Hoffy' Hoffman	
1953	Mission Over Korea	Private Swenson	
1953	The Steel Lady	Jim Evans	
1955	Francis in the Navy	Murph	
1955	Bengazi	Selby	
1956	Anything Goes	Ed Brent	
1956	The Power and the Prize	Lester Everett	
1958	The Rawhide Trail	Rupe Pardee	
1958	Saddle the Wind	Dallas Hanson	
1959	Face of Fire	Al Williams	
1961	Marines, Let's Go	Military Policeman	uncredited
1964	The Brass Bottle	Seymour Jenks	
1966	Namu, the Killer Whale	Deke	
1969	Rascal	Walt Dabbett	
1970	Tora! Tora! Tora!	Colonel Edward F. French	
1973	The Brothers O'Toole	Judge Quincey P. Trumbell	Also directed the film
1974	Mr. Majestyk	Dick Richard	uncredited
1982	Heidi's Song	Herr Sessman	voice
1984	Trancers	Drunken Wise Man	
1985	Tomboy	Chester	
1986	Stewardess School	Attorney	
1987	Beverly Hills Car Park	Waiter	
1994	The Pagemaster	Pirate	voice
1999	The Learning Curve	Ralph	
2008	Empire State Building Murders	Eddie Walker	
2010	The Bag	John Harper	

=== Television ===
Year	Title	Role	Notes
1952	Rebound	Mason	Episode: The Girl
1953	The George Burns and Gracie Allen Show	Various Roles	3 episodes
1953–55	Where's Raymond?	Pete Morrisey	35 episodes
1955	Cavalcade of America	Harry Jordan	Episode: The Gift of Dr. Minot
1955	Medic	Dick Hopper	Episode: Glass of Fear
1955	Schlitz Playhouse	Eddie McGuire	Episode: The Last Out
1955–57	NBC Matinee Theater	Performer	3 episodes
1955	Science Fiction Theatre	Seth Turner	Episode: Are We Invaded?
1956	The Ford Theatre	Pepper	Episode: Double Trouble
1956	Star Stage	Performer	Episode: Career
1956	Crossroads	Performer	Episode: Man on the Totem Pole
1957	West Point	Captain Don Prickette	Episode: Jet Flight
1958–66	Perry Mason	Various Roles	6 episodes
1958	Alfred Hitchcock Presents	Charlie Brown	Season 4 Episode 4: "The Crooked Road"
1959	The Swamp Fox	Sergeant Jasper	2 episodes
1959	The David Niven Show	Bobo	Episode: Life Line
1960	The Danny Thomas Show	Joe Forbes	Episode: Danny, The Handyman
1960	Alcoa Theatre	Matt Brent	Episode: Forced Landing
1960–61	The Tab Hunter Show	Richard Fairfield III	32 episodes
1962	Mister Ed	Ralph	Episode: Unemployment Show
1962–63	Saints and Sinners	Klugie	18 episodes
1963	The Twilight Zone	McNulty	Episode: A Kind of a Stopwatch
1964	Perry Mason	Harry Niles	The Case of the Antic Angel
1965	The Dick Van Dyke Show	Buck Brown	Episode: Baby Fat
1966	Green Acres	Dillwell Pinkley	Episode: A Home Isn't Build for a Day
1967	The Man from U.N.C.L.E.	P.T. Barkley	Episode: The Suburbia Affair
1967	Gomer Pyle USMC	Sergeant Gilroy	Episode: Go Blow Your Horn
1968	Premiere	Murphy	Episode: Out of the Blue
1968	Hogan's Heroes	Walter Hobson	Episode: No Names Please
1969	I Dream of Jeannie	Store Manager	Episode: Ride 'Em Astronaut
1969	The Wild Wild West	Mordecai Krone	Episode: The Night of the Bleak Island
1970	The Beverly Hillbillies	Whitehouse Guard	Episode: The Clampetts in Washington
1970	Nancy	Pruitt	Episode: Going, Going, Going
1970	Here's Lucy	Supermarket Clerk	Episode: Lucy Loses Here Cool
1971	That Girl	Milton	Episode: The Russians Are Staying
1975	Police Story	Detective Eddie Samuels	Episode: The Witness
1975	Kate McShane	Frederick De Fernando	Episode: Kate McShane
1975–76	The Six Million Dollar Man	Vernon/Slayton	2 episodes
1977	The Bionic Woman	Terrence Quinn	Episode: Over the Hill Spy
1978	Alice	Gene Crowley	Episode: The Reporter
1978–82	Lou Grant	Various Roles	4 episodes
1979	Time Express	Horace Hilling	Episode: Rodep/Cop
1979	Scooby-Doo and Scrappy-Doo	Additional Voices	Television Series
1979	The Amazing Spider-Man	Mr. Zeider	2 episodes
1980	One Day at a Time	Charlie	Episode: The Amarillo Connection
1981	Space Stars	Additional Voices	11 episodes
1982	Quincy, M.E.	Miles' Attorney	Episode: Expert in Murder
1983	The Dukes	Additional voices	20 episodes
1986	Jonny Quest	Additional Voices	Television Series
1986	Cheers	Duncan Fitzgerald	Episode: Money Dearest
1986	Pound Puppies	Angry Neighbor	Episode: The Fairy Dogmother
1987	She's the Sheriff	Performer	Episode: A Little Romance
1987	DuckTales	Mayor Rufus B. Pinfeathers; King Arty (voice)	2 episodes
1987	Popeye and Son	Additional Voices	13 episodes
1987	It's a Living	Ernie	Episode: A Pen Pal for Your Thoughts
1988	Jessie	Dr. Adams	Television Movie
1988	The New Yogi Bear Show	Additional Voices	4 episodes
1988	Snorks	Additional Voices	3 episodes
1984–89	Murder, She Wrote	Jonathan / Eggman	2 episodes
1988–89	Fantastic Max	Additional Voices	3 episodes
1989	The Further Adventures of SuperTed	Additional Voices	13 episodes
1989–90	Paddington Bear	Additional Voices	2 episodes
1990	Wings	Howard Banks	Episode: Around the World in 80 Days
1990	Timeless Tales from Hallmark	voice	Episode: The Emperor's New Clothes
1990	Out of This World	Judge	Episode: Forget Your Troubles
1991	The New Adam-12	Man with Dementia	Episode: Dementia
1991–93	The Pirates of Dark Water	Additional Voices	9 episodes
1993	Batman: The Animated Series	Elliot	Episode: See No Evil
1994	Picket Fences	Justice Stevens	Episode: May it Please the Court
1995	Hudson Street	Judge Broadnax	Episode: Contempt
1995	Capitol Critters	Voice	Episode: The Bug House
1997	Beverly Hills, 90210	Mr. Perl	Episode: Pride and Prejudice
2000	Felicity	Howie	Episode: A Good Egg
2002	Boomtown	Kevin's Dad	Episode: Reelin' in the Years
2002	Judging Amy	Mr. Callahan	Episode: Cause for Alarm
2002	The Bernie Mac Show	Frank	Episode: The Sweet Life
2004	Joan of Arcadia	Mr. Hanson	Episode: No Bad Guy
2006	Viagra Falls	Pete	Television Movie
2008	Empire State Building Murders	Eddie Walker	Television Movie
2009	Operating Instructions	Henry	Television Movie
2009–15	Community	Leonard Rodriguez/Briggs	53 episodes
2015	Weird Loners	Carl's Grandfather	Episode: Weird Knight
2017	Dr. Ken	Richard Erdman	Episode: Ken's Big Audition

=== As a director ===
Year	Title	Notes	Ref.
1966	The Dick Van Dyke Show	2 episodes	
1971	Teenage Tease	Feature Film	
1971	Mooch Goes to Hollywood	Television Film	
1973	The Brothers O'Toole	Feature Film	
