= Jungle Raiders (1985 film) =

1985 film by Antonio Margheriti

- Directed by: Antonio Margheriti
- Screenplay by: Giovanni Simonelli
- Story by: Giovanni Simonelli
- Starring: Christopher Connelly; Mary Costa; Lee Van Cleef
- Cinematography: Guglielmo Mancori
- Edited by: Alberto Moriani
- Music by: Carl Taormina
- Production company: L'Immagine
- Distributed by: Variety Distribution
- Release date: 1985
- Country: Italy

Jungle Raiders (Italian: La leggenda del rubino malese, lit. 'Legend of the Malaysian ruby') is a 1985 adventure film directed by Antonio Margheriti. The film stars Christopher Connelly and Lee Van Cleef.

== Plot ==
Captain Yankee and his friend make a living by selling fake adventure dreams to rich foreigners. With the help of some natives, they let their rich clients think they have lived fantastic adventures. One day, a Colombian museum director arrives to search for a fabulous "ruby of doom," and Captain Yankee is blackmailed into accepting the task.

== Cast ==
- Christopher Connelly as Captain Yankee
- Lee Van Cleef as Warren
- Marina Costa as Maria Janez
- Luciano Pigozzi as Gin Fizz (as Alan Collins)
- Dario Pontonutti
- Mike Monty as Professor Lansky
- Rene Abadeza as Alain

== Releases ==
Jungle Raiders was released in 1985.

== Reception ==
In a retrospective review, Jeremy Wheeler (AllMovie) described the film as "Raiders of the Lost Ark rip-off that did its homework," noting that it directly stole dialogue and scenes from the film, including the snake pit scene and a kidnapping in an open market with laundry baskets. The review concluded to not "expect much else from this cheap Italian knock-off."

== Footnotes ==
=== Sources ===
- Curti, Roberto (2019). Italian Gothic Horror Films, 1980-1989. McFarland. ISBN 978-1476672434.
- Wheeler, Jeremy. "Hunters of the Golden Cobra (1984)". AllMovie. Archived from the original on April 4, 2019.
