= Joe Camp =

American film director (1939–2024)

- Born: Joseph Shelton Camp Jr. April 20, 1939; St. Louis, Missouri, U.S.
- Died: March 15, 2024 (aged 84); Bell Buckle, Tennessee, U.S.
- Occupations: Film director, screenwriter
- Spouses: Andrea Carolyn Camp (m. 1960; died 1997) Kathleen Camp (m. 2001)
- Children: 1

Joseph Shelton Camp Jr. (April 20, 1939 – March 15, 2024) was an American film director and writer who is best known as the creator and director of the Benji films, as well as Hawmps! and The Double McGuffin. He made over $600 million in gross income and was one of the most successful independent filmmakers in history.

He studied advertising and marketing at the University of Mississippi from 1957 to 1961. He married his college sweetheart, Carolyn Hopkins, in 1960. He was with her until her death from heart disease in 1997. He married a second and final time to Kathleen Camp in 2001, whom he was with until his death in 2024.

Camp was also known for his work with horses. He owned and trained five horses at his Valley Center Ranch where he lived in Valley Center, California. He wrote two books about his experiences with horses, The Soul of a Horse: Life Lessons from the Herd and Born Wild: The Journey Continues. He wrote eleven more books including three novels, a dog training book, an autobiography, and children's books.

Camp owned a production company with his first wife, Mulberry Square Productions; he had a minority interest in the film studio, Filmdallas Pictures. He lived in Bell Buckle, Tennessee, with his second wife until he died on March 15, 2024, at the age of 84.

== Early life ==
Joseph S. Camp Jr. was born in St. Louis, Missouri, on April 20, 1939. He lived in Little Rock, Arkansas, until 1948 when his family briefly moved to Los Angeles. On New Year's Day 1949 Camp's family announced the move to Jackson, Mississippi, where they lived until 1951 when his family decided to settle in Memphis, Tennessee. He graduated from East High School in 1957 and considered himself to be on the outskirts because of the cliquey nature of the school. He wanted to attend film school at University of California, Los Angeles but his parents resisted, insisting he attend "Ole Miss" (the University of Mississippi) to secure a job. While in college, Camp was involved in campus life by helping run student campaigns and being in a fraternity. He had a passion for filmmaking and even worked on a movie set that was in town to film. During his sophomore year of college he even attempted to transfer to UCLA Film school but was ultimately rejected.

Camp met his first wife, Carolyn Hopkins, at a Holiday Inn in Jackson, Mississippi, when she was in town visiting with her sorority sisters. He fell in love with her after a few hours and was devastated by her death in 1997. They had a son, Brandon Camp, in 1971.

Before entering the film world Camp worked as an amateur magician, as a field advertising crew member for Procter & Gamble, and as an advertising assistant for MGM.

Camp said he got the inspiration for Benji while watching Lady and the Tramp with his first wife Carolyn. He made connections in Hollywood through a college friend, Tom Lester, but numerous film companies did not want to produce the movie. He and his co-producer, Ed Vanston, created their own distribution company in order to release the film worldwide. With Camp's marketing and advertising background he was able to personally develop the strategy to make the film a hit. He continued working in the film industry until 2024.

== Filmography ==
- Benji (1974)
- Hawmps! (1976)
- For the Love of Benji (1977)
- The Phenomenon of Benji (1978)
- Benji's Very Own Christmas Story (TV short, 1978)
- The Double McGuffin (1979)
- Oh! Heavenly Dog (1980)
- Benji, Zax & the Alien Prince (TV series, 1983)
- Benji the Hunted (1987)
- Benji: Off the Leash! (2004)
- Benji (2018)

== Awards and nominations ==
Year	Association	Category	Nominated work	Result
1979	Primetime Emmy Award	Outstanding Children's Program	Benji's Very Own Christmas	Nominated
1980	Primetime Emmy Award	Outstanding Children's Program	Benji At Work	Won
