= Higgins (dog) =

Dog actor

- Born: 1963; Los Angeles, California, U.S.
- Died: November 11, 1975; Los Angeles, California, U.S.
- Occupation: Actor
- Notable role: Dog in Petticoat Junction; Benji in Benji
- Years active: 1963–1974
- Offspring: Benjean
- Awards: PATSY Award for Best Canine; 1966

Higgins (1963 – November 11, 1975) was a well-known American dog actor during the 1960s and 1970s. He is most remembered for his roles in the original Benji film, and his uncredited role in Petticoat Junction, two of the most popular roles he played during an 11-year career in show business.

== Early life ==
In 1963, animal trainer Frank Inn found the dog at the Burbank Animal Shelter as a puppy. He was believed to be a mix of Miniature Poodle, Cocker Spaniel, and Schnauzer, or a Border Terrier.

== Career ==
Higgins's career was facilitated by Frank Inn, who also trained Arnold Ziffel (the pig) and all of the other animals used on The Beverly Hillbillies, Petticoat Junction, Green Acres, and The Waltons TV series. His on-set assistant trainers included Gerry Warshauer and Karl Miller.

As an actor, Higgins first came to national attention as the uncredited dog who played the character of "Dog" on the television sitcom Petticoat Junction for six of the show's seven seasons, from 1964 to 1970, appearing in 149 episodes. He guest-appeared on the television sitcom Green Acres with Eva Gabor in 1965 and also made a guest appearance on the television sitcom The Beverly Hillbillies. Due to his work in Petticoat Junction, Higgins received a PATSY Award in 1966 in the television category, and he was cover-featured on an issue of TV Guide magazine.

Higgins was able to convey a broad range of emotions through his facial expressions. Inn, who trained thousands of animals of many species during his lifetime, told reporters that Higgins was the smartest dog he had ever worked with and noted that during his prime years in television, he learned one new trick or routine per week and retained these routines from year to year, making it possible for him to take on increasingly varied and complex roles. Higgins's tricks included yawning and sneezing on cue.

In 1971, Higgins starred in the television film Mooch Goes to Hollywood with Zsa Zsa Gabor and Vincent Price, and appeared in the 1973 movie The Mystery in Dracula's Castle. He came out of retirement at an estimated age of 11 to star in the 1974 feature film Benji, which became his greatest commercial success.

== Personal life ==
=== Friends ===
Higgins had a close rapport with the actor Edgar Buchanan, who played Uncle Joe Carson on Petticoat Junction. In the official cast pictures taken each year during the run of Petticoat Junction, Buchanan is shown holding or petting Higgins. Buchanan guest-starred on 17 episodes of the sitcom Green Acres, and Higgins guest-starred in two of those appearances. Buchanan and Higgins crossed paths for the last time in Benji, which was coincidentally also the last film in which both actors appeared. The two actors had an obvious fondness for one another, which is especially clear in Benji, because the movie's naturalistic pacing allowed them to interact as friends rather than requiring that Higgins perform a specific trick to which Buchanan would react.

Frank Inn and Higgins were very close in real life as well as on the job. Inn wrote a poem about the dog called My Little Brown Dog.

=== Family ===
Higgins's progeny carried on his work in a continuing series of movies and television series featuring the Benji character, beginning with For the Love of Benji in 1977, in which Higgins's daughter Benjean inherited the role of Benji after Higgins's death.

== Death ==
Higgins died in 1975 at the age of 12. Inn had the dog's body cremated and saved the ashes in an urn on his mantelpiece. He then wrote a Christian poem in memory of Higgins called My Gift to Jesus. Inn died in 2002 and requested that Higgins's ashes be buried in his coffin with him. Inn is buried at Forest Lawn Memorial Park.

== See also ==
- List of individual dogs
