= Benji (1974 film) =

1974 American film directed by Joe Camp

- Theatrical release poster
- Directed by: Joe Camp
- Written by: Joe Camp
- Produced by: Joe Camp
- Starring: Peter Breck; Christopher Connelly; Patsy Garrett; Tom Lester; Mark Slade; Herb Vigran; Deborah Walley; Frances Bavier; Edgar Buchanan; Terry Carter
- Cinematography: Don Reddy
- Edited by: Leon Seith
- Music by: Euel Box
- Distributed by: Mulberry Square Releasing
- Release date: May 22, 1974; (Dallas)
- Running time: 85 minutes
- Country: United States
- Language: English
- Budget: $500,000
- Box office: $45 million

Benji is a 1974 American independent family film written, produced and directed by Joe Camp. It is the first in a series of five films about the golden mixed breed dog named Benji. Filmed in and around McKinney and Denton in Texas, the story follows Benji, a stray but friendly dog, who is adored by some of the townspeople, including two children named Cindy and Paul. The children fail to convince their father, Dr. Chapman, to allow Benji to stay at their home. When the children are kidnapped by a band of robbers as part of a ransom, Benji attempts to rescue them. The film grossed $45 million on a budget of $500,000, and its theme song received an Oscar nomination for Best Original Song. The film was turned down by every studio in Hollywood; Camp had to form his own film company to distribute the film worldwide. This film was Frances Bavier's and Edgar Buchanan's last on-screen acting appearances before they retired and died in 1989 and 1979 respectively.

== Plot ==
Benji, a stray dog who lives in an abandoned house on the outskirts of a small town, sets about his daily ritual of visiting human friends. He has no fixed home, but he desires one, and he likes the children of the Chapman family, Paul and Cindy, best. Mary, their housekeeper, feeds him, but she knows that the children's father, Dr. Chapman, must not find out about him because he will fire her. One day, their father is about to appear, so they hide Benji under the table. After outwitting Dr. Chapman, the children leave for school and Mary explains to Benji that Dr. Chapman stubbornly dislikes dogs, but he is a nice man. Continuing on his route, Benji chases a cat and greets Officer Tuttle, who announces his wedding engagement and tells Benji that he, too, will soon meet the lady of his dreams. At Bill's Café, Benji wakes Bill from his morning nap and receives a bone as payment. Returning home, Benji finds three suspicious characters, Linda, Henry, and Riley, breaking in. Although Henry and Riley are spooked by legends that the house is haunted, Linda intends to propose the location as a hideout to their boss Mitch, mastermind of their illicit activities. Henry leaves a bag of groceries behind, and Benji consumes an open pudding cup.

The next day at the Chapman home, the children brush Benji, hoping their father will accept him into the family, but Mary tells them that the doctor will not change his mind. After impressing his human friends with his new hairstyle, Benji encounters a pretty white dog in the park who is scavenging through his favorite trashcan. Benji presents her with the bone he received from Bill, and she follows him back to the Chapman house, where Mary names her Tiffany after the jewelry store. Benji and Tiffany frolic in the park, but when they return to Benji's home, they find that Riley and Henry have returned. Riley points out that Henry's groceries have been overturned and becomes anxious that the house is haunted. As Mitch and Linda arrive to survey the property, Riley tells Henry that a pudding cup is missing, but Henry warns him against upsetting their plans.

The following morning, Dr. Chapman discovers that his folks have been feeding Benji, and tells his children that Benji carries diseases and forbids them to keep him. Later, Riley writes a ransom note to extort money from Dr. Chapman by threatening his children, but Henry throws it on the floor, writes a new one, and orders Riley to deliver it when he gives him the signal. Meanwhile, Mitch surprises Henry and Linda by actually kidnapping the Chapman children. Benji races to the Chapman home to alert the humans but is shooed out by Mary, not understanding his message. Benji returns to his home to steal the ransom note, hoping that by doing that, he'll make the police follow him to the source of trouble, but he is stopped, and the note is taken from him. Benji then follows Officer Tuttle into the police station but gets locked in. When he barks through an intercom, he is released by a passing police officer.

Returning to the crime scene, he snatches Riley's first ransom note and is grabbed by Mitch. Tiffany rushes out and bites him and gets a vicious kick in return. Benji runs home, where he finds that Linda has preceded him in an attempt to cut off his efforts. She snatches the note from Benji and puts it in her purse. He growls and barks, and Mary berates him and carries him away, but he bites her and lunges at Linda, causing the note to fall out. Mary reads it and rushes it to Dr. Chapman, who demands to know where his children are, and Linda breaks down in tears. Benji leads the police, the FBI, Dr. Chapman, and Mary to the hideout. Meanwhile, the kidnappers are concerned that Linda has not returned, and Henry and Riley argue that they should leave. As they walk outside, however, the police hold them at gunpoint and the children reunite with their father and Mary. Their father is so proud of the dogs that he says they can stay with them permanently, much to their and the children's delight.

== Cast ==
- Higgins as Benji
- Patsy Garrett as Mary
- Cynthia Smith as Cindy Chapman
- Allen Fiuzat as Paul Chapman
- Peter Breck as Dr. Chapman
- Christopher Connelly as Henry
- Tom Lester as Riley
- Mark Slade as Mitch
- Deborah Walley as Linda
- Herb Vigran as Lt. Samuels
- Frances Bavier as Lady with Cat
- Edgar Buchanan as Bill
- Terry Carter as Officer Tuttle
- Larry Swartz as Floyd
- J.D. Young as Second Policeman
- White Dog as Tiffany
- January L'Angelle as Student (uncredited)
- John P. Biff Painter as Store Burglar

== Theme song ==
The film's theme song, "I Feel Love", recorded by the country music musician Charlie Rich, won a Golden Globe award for Best Original Song in 1975. It also received an Oscar nomination for Best Original Song.

== Production ==
The outdoor scenes were filmed primarily in McKinney, Texas; and the house located at 1104 South Tennessee Street served as the "haunted house" where the Chapman kids were held hostage, as well as serving as production headquarters during the filming. The house has since been renovated into a bed and breakfast. The park scenes were in Dallas. The municipal building was filmed in Denton, Texas.

The film and the ensuing franchise was created after Joe Camp expressed concern over the overabundance of family films released through the four-wall distribution concept. He told Variety magazine in 1977: "It has become an industry-caused thing, but the G-rated classification has to some degree become 'if it's G, it can't be for me'." Camp observed that four-wall companies had saturated the market for G-rated product; in response to the diminished quality of their films, he created Benji.

Higgins appeared on screen with Edgar Buchanan, with whom he had appeared in the TV series Petticoat Junction; this was the final film for both.

It was one of the last film appearances of Deborah Walley.

== Reception and legacy ==
Produced on a budget of $500,000, it grossed $31.5 million in the United States, making it the ninth highest-grossing film of 1974. The film grossed a total of $45 million in worldwide receipts. The film earned an 86% approval rating on the review aggregate website Rotten Tomatoes.

Variety called the film "a very superior piece of family fare. Its star is a dog, ragtag in appearance and with a winning way that should endear it to every audience fortunate enough to catch the picture." Linda Gross of the Los Angeles Times called it a "cheery family film" that was "prettily photographed." Michael Grossbard of The Monthly Film Bulletin described the film as "quite effectively told from a doggy-eye view" and wrote that Joe Camp "seems to have cracked the Disney monopoly on family entertainment with his first effort, though the Master in his heyday had more wit, originality and artistry."

Gene Siskel of the Chicago Tribune, on the other hand, gave the film two-and-a-half stars out of four, calling it "agreeable" but criticizing "a few cheap grabs for emotion."

Higgins was nominated for a PATSY Award for the best animal performance of the year in a feature film, but lost out to Tonto the cat from the Oscar-winning Harry and Tonto.

== See also ==
- List of American films of 1974
