= Benji =

Fictional dog

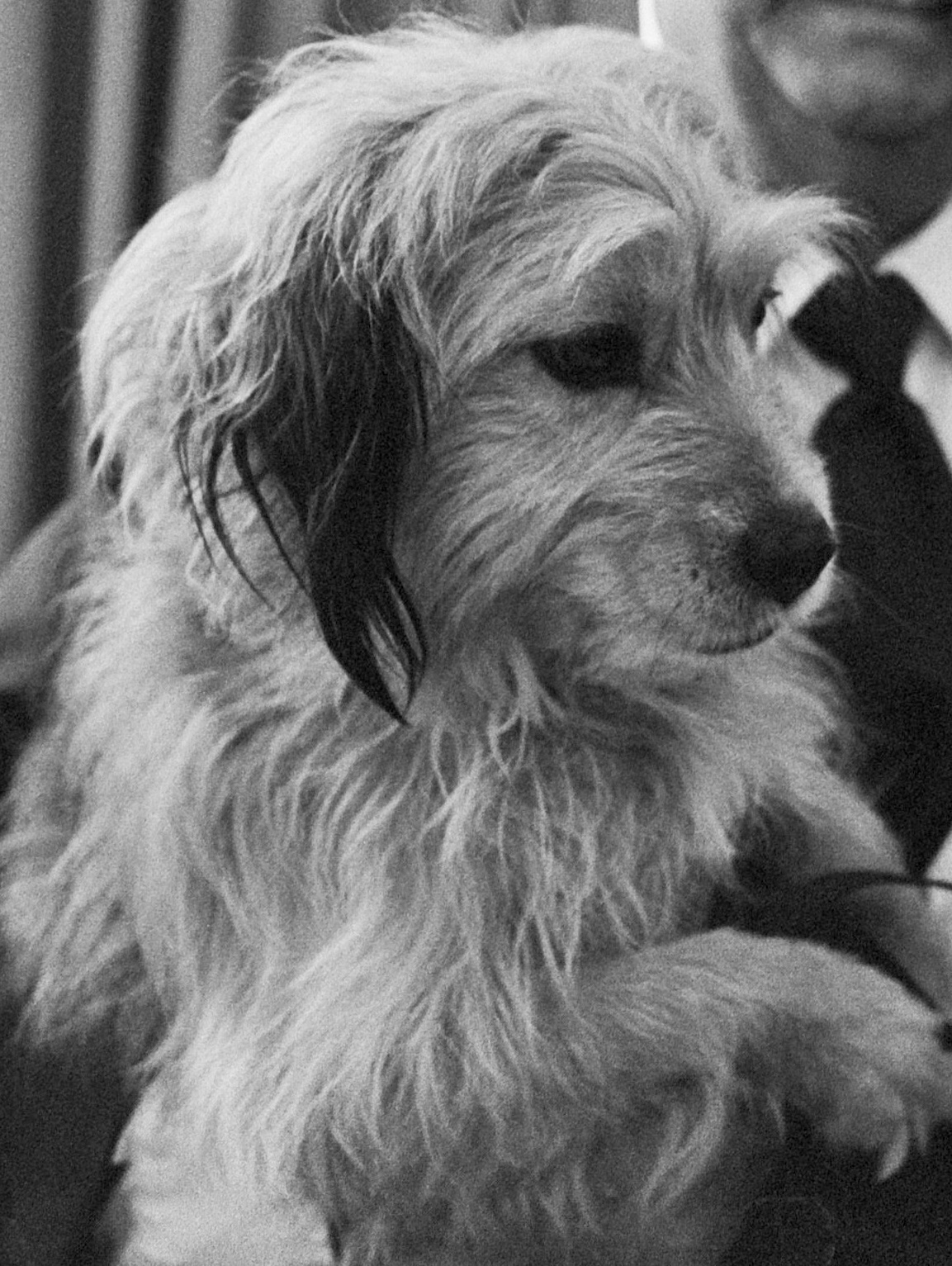
- Benji (portrayed by Benjean) in 1979
- First appearance: Benji (1974)
- Last appearance: Benji (2018)
- Created by: Joe Camp
- Portrayed by: Higgins, Benjean, Moochie, Fairfield, Sally Sue, Odola
- Voiced by: Chevy Chase (Oh! Heavenly Dog)

In-universe information
- Species: Dog
- Gender: Male

Benji is a fictional canine character created by Joe Camp. He has been the focus of several feature films and other media, beginning with the independently produced 1974 film of that title. Benji is a small, golden, mixed-breed dog with a knack for being in the right place at the right time, usually to help someone overcome a problem.

== Casting ==
The character has been portrayed by several different mixed-breed dogs over the years. A dog named Ginger played Benji's mom, Daisy.

After the release of Benji: Off the Leash!, Joe Camp told an interviewer that he decided from the beginning to use only rescue dogs:

The original Benji came out of a shelter, which stimulated the whole shelter issue because the American Humane Society reported that over a million dogs were adopted around the country because the original Benji had come out of a shelter. So this time around we decided this was the thing to do. In the fall of 2001 we struck out, started in Chicago, and started touring shelters and dragging media along with us because we had found that everywhere you mix Benji and media, adoptions go up. So we began there and we went to Atlanta, Philadelphia, Phoenix, and Los Angeles. And we were down in Gulfport, Mississippi at a PetSmart meeting this other dog named Jody, when the director of the shelter walked in and said, "What do you think of this one?" And I was in love immediately. I knew we were done. She was so bright and so intuitive. I took a picture of her ten minutes after meeting her. Just being able to do that with a dog that has been on the streets and put in a shelter, and having gone through whatever she went through, is remarkable. In fact, it's that questioning of why would anybody abandon such a wonderful dog, and how long was she on the streets, that really bubbled up the entire story of this movie, because it is in effect her story out there on the streets. We had a Christmas script that we were actually pointing toward doing, and then this thing started coming up through the surface and I said, "No, this is what we have to do." So we put that aside and wrote a new screenplay for her.

== Breeds ==
All of the Benji dogs are mutts. Higgins, found as a puppy, had a shaggy, golden-tan coat adorned with white markings.

== Training ==
Frank Inn adopted Higgins (who was three years old) in 1960 from the Burbank Animal Shelter and brought him home to be a pet and show-business dog for his wife Juanita and himself. Inn trained Higgins for roles in such TV shows as The Beverly Hillbillies (10 episodes), Petticoat Junction (all episodes), and Green Acres (three episodes). After a few episodes of Lassie, Inn retired Higgins, but brought him back at age 14 in 1974 to star in Benji.

Inn, also a dog breeder, bred Higgins for more offspring that resembled him. These included daughter Benjean. Higgins died in 1975, and the filmmakers knew they would want future Benjis. Joe's wife, Andrea Carolyn Hopkins Camp (who also served as producer and assistant director on the 1974 Benji, and Benji the Hunted, and Benji, Zax & the Alien Prince in the 1980s), ran a training "Benji boot camp" whenever her husband and son came home from the animal shelter with multiple likely candidates. For Benji: Off the Leash!, for example, three dogs were adopted and trained; one dog was given away, Moochie became the new Benji, and Shaggy, his sidekick, was played by a dog nicknamed Lizard Tongue.

Several animal handlers worked with the various Benjis across the years. Gerry Kerns served as Benji's trainer, and Roger Schumacher as Shaggy's trainer, for Benji: Off the Leash!.

== Filmography ==
=== Films ===
- Benji (1974)
- Hawmps! (1976; cameo)
- For the Love of Benji (1977)
- The Double McGuffin (1979; cameo)
- Oh! Heavenly Dog (1980)
- Benji the Hunted (1987)
- Benji: Off the Leash! (2004)
- Benji (2018)

=== Television ===
- Benji's Very Own Christmas Story (1978) - Christmas special; nominated for 1979 Primetime Emmy Award for Outstanding Children's Program.
- Benji at Work (1980) - television making of featurette for Oh Heaveny Dog; winner 1980 Primetime Emmy Award for Outstanding Children's Program
- Benji Takes a Dive at Marineland (1981) - television special at Marineland of Florida
- Benji, Zax & the Alien Prince (1983) - 13 episode television series

=== Documentaries ===
- Benji's Life Story (1976) - 16 min theatrical short accompanying Hawmps!
- The Phenomenon of Benji (1978) - 30 min television special

=== Video games ===
- Benji: Space Rescue (1983) for C64

=== Collections ===
- Benji's Film Festival (2001)
