= Lists of cats =

The cat (Felis silvestris catus), also known as the domestic cat or house cat to distinguish it from other felines, is a small carnivorous species of crepuscular mammal that is often valued by humans for its companionship and its ability to hunt vermin.

Lists of cats include:

- List of individual cats – individual notable cats
- List of cat breeds
- List of experimental cat breeds
- List of fictional cats
  - List of fictional cats in animation
  - List of fictional cats in comics
  - List of fictional cats in film
  - List of fictional cats in literature
  - List of fictional cats in television
