= List of fictional cats in animation =

This list of fictional cats and other felines is subsidiary to the list of fictional cats. It is restricted solely to notable feline characters from notable animated television shows and film. For characters that appear in several separate television series, only the earliest series will be recorded here. It does not include video games but includes characters from TV series, films, and other animated media. Fictional big cats are listed elsewhere.

== TV series ==
Character	Series name	Notes	Ref
Amanojaku	Ghost Stories	Amanojaku is a demon trapped inside of a cat's body.	
Autocat	Motormouse and Autocat	First appeared in Cattanooga Cats and later in Motormouse and Autocat, a race car-driving cat that chases a motorcycle-driving mouse named Motormouse.	
Artemis	Sailor Moon	Guardian to Sailor Venus, from the Planet Mau.	
Azrael	Smurfs	Gargamel's pet cat. Although Gargamel never treats him well, Azrael manages to put up with his master.	
Babbit and Catstello	Merrie Melodies	Babbit and Catstello are Looney Tunes based on the comedic duo Abbott and Costello. Although the short, fat character calls the other one "Babbit", the tall, skinny one never addresses his partner by name; the name "Catstello" was invented later. In two other shorts they are portrayed as mice instead of cats.	
Beans	Merrie Melodies	Early colleague of Porky Pig and sometimes Ham and Ex's uncle.	
Bartleby	True and the Rainbow Kingdom	True's anthropomorphic navy blue talking pet cat and sidekick who is quite loyal to her.	
Benjamin "Benny" Ball	Top Cat	A member of Top Cat's gang. A kind-hearted tubby grey-blue cat.	
Beverely	Where's Huddles?	Spoiled cat of Claude Pertwee.	
Billy the Cat	Billy the Cat	A boy named Billy is transformed into a cat by a magician who decides to teach the boy a lesson.	
Bitsy	SuperKitties	One of the four members of the titular superhero team.	
Blossom	Fetch! with Ruff Ruffman	Ruff Ruffman's "cool" assistant.	
Bonkers D. Bobcat	Bonkers	A bobcat policeman.	
Boo	Funky Phantom	Ghost cat sidekick of Funky Phantom who teased Elmo the dog.	
Box Prince	Adventure Time	A male cat and the prince of the Box Kingdom.	
Brain	Top Cat	A member of Top Cat's gang. A dim-witted ginger cat.	
Branya	The Comic Artist and Assistants	An adorable little orange kitty who embodies the manga's mascot. He wears a black tuxedo and a pink bra over his ears. He communicates with cute little poster signs and is very cuddly.	
Buckley	Slacker Cats	One of the two main protagonists of Slacker Cats, along with Eddie. He is a cat owned by Louise, living in her apartment.	
Buddy	SuperKitties	One of the four members of the titular superhero team.	
Butch	Tom and Jerry	A black and white alley cat, who made his first appearance in the Tom and Jerry series in the 1943 short, Baby Puss (in which he serves as the secondary villain/main archenemy) alongside Topsy atund the already-established Meathead.	
Cake the Cat	Adventure Time	A cat who exists in Fionna's world and gender-swapped version of Jake the Dog.	
Cake the Cat	Adventure Time: Fionna and Cake	A cat who exists in Fionna's world and gender-swapped version of Jake the Dog.	
Cali	Paw Patrol	Katie's cat; friend of the PAW Patrol.	
Carla	Fairy Tail	Carla (シャルル Sharuru) is an Exceed, the daughter of Queen Shagotte, and a close companion to Wendy Marvell. She and Wendy belonged to Cait Shelter before joining Fairy Tail. Carla is a small, white Exceed with pink ears and brown eyes, which are smaller than Happy's eyes. She also has two whiskers on each side of her face. Carla wears a pink bow near the end of her tail. Unlike the carefree Happy, Carla is very strict and serious most of the time, rarely showing emotions.	
Cat	CatDog	Somewhat uptight and believes strongly in being polite and neat. He is a stickler for cleanliness and, like most cats, is aquaphobic. He is also obsessed with jet skis.	
Cat	Peg + Cat	A blue cat whose best friend is Peg. He loves circles and accompanies Peg on her adventures. Cat often inspires Peg to realize a solution to a problem without being aware of it himself.	
Cat Burglar	SuperKitties	One of the primary antagonists of the show.	
The Catillac Cats	Heathcliff	A group of cats who live in a junkyard and headed by Riff-Raff and supported by Cleo cat (Riff-Raff girlfriend), Hector a streetwise Hispanic cat, Wordsworth W. Wordsworth a hip-hop groovy cat who speaks in rhyme, Mungo a big black Persian cat and Spike the junkyard dog.	
Cattanooga Cats	Cattanooga Cats	A musical band of hillbilly cats, named Country, Kitty Jo, Scoots, and Groove.	
Chance (T-Bone)	SWAT Kats	The larger member of the SWAT Kats and pilot of the Turbokat jet. T-Bone is one of the best pilots in the SWAT Kat universe, as seen in "Cry Turmoil." He loves aerial warfare history, as seen in "The Ghost Pilot," and Scaredy Kat cartoons.	
Chi	Chi's Sweet Home	An adorable gray and white kitten with black stripes wanders away from her family and is found by a young boy, Youhei, and his mother. They take the kitten home and Chi then has a splendid time living with her new family, learning about different things and meeting new people and animals.	
Chloe	Simon's Cat	A girl cat who wears a heart collar. She is the love interest of Cat.	
Choo-Choo	Top Cat	Second-in-command of Top Cat's gang. A pink cat with a Brooklyn accent and a level head.	
Claude Cat	Looney Tunes	(a pun on the homophone "clawed cat") had his origins in several other cat characters used by Chuck Jones from 1940 to 1945. These cats were mostly similar in appearance and temperament, with black fur and anxious personalities.	
Cleopawtra	The Loud House	A cat owned by the McBride family.	
Cliff	The Loud House	The Loud family's pet cat.	
Courageous Cat	Courageous Cat and Minute Mouse	The protector of Empire City. When fighting bad guys, Courageous Cat would use all-purpose Cat Gun or a vast variety of different deus ex machina "trick guns" he pulls out of his cape.	
Copycat	Paw Patrol	Enemy of the Paw Patrol, he gained the capability of speech and the combined superpowers of the Paw Patrol after obtaining a meteor fragment.	
Custard	Roobarb	A chubby pink cat who likes to play pranks on his next-door-neighbor, a dog named Roobarb.	
Daru	She and Her Cat	A cat which lives with a young female office worker named Miyu, and watches her over the course of a year's time, remaining with her through the ups and downs of her life, including when she brings men home or drinks alcohol. His name in the short animated series was changed from the name in the manga: Chobi.	
Diana	Jewelpet	A Black Munchkin cat with white paws who uses Dark Magic. She wears a lace-trimmed pink waistcoat, a pink bow, and a silver heart-shaped necklace.	
Diana	Sailor Moon	Child of Luna and Artemis and guardian to Chibiusa.	
Doc	Hickory, Dickory, and Doc	A Doc think black and white cat tuxedo voiced by Paul Frees.	
Dodsworth	Looney Tunes	An obese, lethargic black-and-white cat with a large red nose (voiced by Edward Selzer and based on W.C. Fields) who tries to get a small white kitten to do his mousing for him.	
Doraemon	Doraemon	A blue, robot cat from the future to help his owner's great-great-grandfather, Nobi Nobita who often have problems.	
Dydo	The Mighty Hercules	The evil wizard Daedalus's pet cat, which is grey and ill-tempered.	
Eek	Eek! The Cat	A purple cat whose motto is "it never hurts to help", though his situations dictate otherwise.	
Elsie	Stanley	A talking cat and one of the main characters of the show.	
Evil the Cat	Earthworm Jim	The ruler of Planet Heck, intent on claiming Jim's super suit or destroying the universe. He is frequently assisted, but more often annoyed, by his aide Henchrat.	
Fancy-Fancy	Top Cat	A member of Top Cat's gang. A laid-back brown cat with an eye for female cats.	
Fantomcat	Fantomcat	The Duke of Fantom. A masked swashbuckling hero who joins the Detective Team after his release and is nicknamed Fantomcat.	
Fat Cat	Chip 'n Dale Rescue Rangers	Rescue Rangers' enemy.	
Felicia	The Secret Lives of Waldo Kitty	Waldo's girlfriend and trusty companion, and during the animation portions of the show, she is usually held captive or kidnapped by Tyrone and eventually rescued by Waldo	
Felix	Felix the Cat	A cute, funny black and white cat created in the silent film era. In later decades he has a "Magic Bag of Tricks" and said to be "one of the most recognized cartoon characters in film history."	
Fire Demon	Brave Animated Series	An anthropomorfic fire cat with pyrokinesis.	
Fluffy	Rugrats	Angelica's pet cat.	
Fraidy	Fraidy Cat	A scrawny yellow cat who is prone misfortune as he is living his last life and always accidentally summons one of his former lives (or a storm cloud in the case of nine) when he says a number between one till nine or anything that sounds remotely like those numbers.	
Fritz	Fritz the Cat	The main character of the Fritz the Cat films and comics. He is a college-aged anthropomorphic cat, presumably living in the 1960s.	
Furrball	Tiny Toon Adventures	A greyish-blue ragged looking cat, with a bandage around his tail. Has many similarities to Sylvester and Penelope Pussycat and is prone to getting in unfortunate encounters. Serves once as Fifi La Fume's love interest and sometimes as Elmyra Duff's pet.	
Garnet	Jewelpet	A pink Persian Cat who symbolizes love, and usually has a mature, feminine personality. She wears a red ribbon on her head and a pink jewel necklace. One of the three main characters of the series.	
Gilbert	Caillou	The titular character's pet cat.	
Ginny	SuperKitties	One of the four members of the titular superhero team.	
Gordon	Catscratch	A Scottish speaking cat who is the brother of Mr. Blik and Waffle.	
Quito Anchovy	Samurai Pizza Cats	A male pizza delivery carrier and a member of the Pizza Cats.	
Gumball Watterson	The Amazing World of Gumball	A blue preteen anthropomorphic cat who is the series' protagonist.	
Hachi	My Roommate Is a Cat	Nana's Tuxedo Cat and Haru's brother.	
Haibuchi	The Cat and the Dragon	A cat living in town surrounded by a castle.	
Happy	Fairy Tail	A small blue cat with a white underbelly and a down-to-earth, loyal, usually mischievous personality. Happy is a magical creature with the ability to grow wings and fly with his magic, and wears a green sack where he keeps food and items.	
Happy	Edens Zero	An alien cat who was resurrected as a cyborg after getting run over by a drunk driver, and can morph his body into a pair of rayguns used by his best friend, Rebecca.	
Haru	My Roommate Is a Cat	A stray Tuxedo cat, adopted by Subaru. Her life prior to being adopted was rough; she was trained by Miz Tora to survive in this harsh world and she took care of her four younger siblings and struggled to feed herself and them. She and Subaru rarely understand each other, but their misunderstandings lead to a common goal.	
Heathcliff	Heathcliff	He is an orange tabby cat who also appeared in another TV series four years later.	
Henry's Cat	Henry's Cat	A laid-back ponderous yellow cat who likes eating, but whose actual name isn't known.	
Hissy	Puppy Dog Pals	The sister of the two protagonists.	
Mr. Hubert	Billy the Cat	A white cat with a bowtie and Billy's guardian who teaches Billy how to survive on the streets. He lives in a Cadillac car in a junk yard and speaks with a British accent.	
Husk	Hazbin Hotel	A winged black cat demon who serves as Hazbin Hotel's front desk clerk and bartender.	
Jabari	Kingdom Force	A male cheetah. He is one of six main leading characters and the team's youngest member.	
Jack	Oggy and The Cockroaches	A cousin to Oggy.	
Jade Catkin	Littlest Pet Shop: A World of Our Own	Jade Catkin is Roxie's roommate who is a gothic bombay cat. She is also Roxie's best friend and she loves to sleep.	
Jake (Razor)	SWAT Kats	The smaller member of the SWAT Kats, who is a mechanical genius. He designed the various gadgets and advanced weaponry used in the Turbokat, and he serves as the radar interceptor and weapons control officer, or RIO, in the Turbokat.	
James the Cat	James the Cat	This series chronicles the many events which take place at the Cornerhouse (number 104) between James and his new animal friends.	
Jazz	Simon's Cat	A grumpy territorial Persian cat and arch-nemesis of Cat who Cat often gets into fights with.	
Jenny	Bucky O'Hare	The attractive pilot of the Righteous Indignation, who belongs to an order of artificers (witches).	
Jess	Postman Pat	Black and white cat of the title song in the BBC children's series.	
Jibanyan	Yo-kai Watch	A nekomata who was once an ordinary cat named Rudy. He died and became a Yōkai after saving his owner, Amy, from being hit by a truck.	
Josephine	Nyan Koi!	Josephine is a cat owned by Nagi. He is dressed up in an elegant manner, and speaks in a Kansai dialect.	
Julius	Alice Comedies	A tuxedo cat who serves as a sidekick to Alice. He was the first recurring cartoon character created by Walt Disney.	
Katerina Kittycat	Daniel Tiger's Neighborhood	Katerina lives with her mother, Henrietta Pussycat, in the treehouse and loves dancing. She is O the Owl's next-door neighbor and one of Daniel's closest friends.	
Katnip	Herman and Katnip	Herman's enemy.	
Katz	Courage the Cowardly Dog	He is a red thin cat with yellow eyes. He is an antagonist as owner of sinister shops all having his name in him. He is quite good at sports and luring unsuspecting people to the traps he sets up, just for his own amusement.	
KeeKee	Hazbin Hotel	Charlie's shape-changing demonic pet cat/key.	
Kirara	InuYasha	Sango's faithful demon-cat companion who usually appears to be a small kitten-sized feline with two tails, but can become large enough to carry several passengers whenever the need arises.	
The Kitten	Simon's Cat	The Cat's flatmate who appears to be more intelligent than his older feline friend despite its young age.	
Kitten Catastrophe Crew	Paw Patrol	Evil feline doppelgangers of the Paw Patrol.	
Kitty	Danger Rangers	A pink cat. She is the intelligent, cool and adventurous second-in-command of the group. She is also helpful and resourceful, and strongly believes in playing fair.	
Kitty Katswell	T.U.F.F. Puppy	A female cat who is one of T.U.F.F.'s best agents. She is also Dudley's partner and best friend. Skilled in various fighting styles and use of firearms, short-tempered, and easily startled, Kitty is a force to be reckoned with.	
Krazy Kat	Krazy Kat	Surreal cartoon based on a comic by George Herriman.	
Kuro	Cyborg Kuro-chan	A Black and white robotic cat tuxedo.	
Kuro	Love Hina	A black cat with huge ears which follows Kanako.	
Kuroneko-sama	Trigun	A black cat who appears in every episode of Trigun.	
Kuro	My Roommate Is a Cat	A stray black cat who was friends with Tora.	
Kurobane	The Cat and the Dragon	A black cat which is strong and lives deep inside of a forest with his siblings Chiikuro and Kurotama.	
Kwazii	Octonauts	A humanized orange cat with a mysterious pirate past. He has a habit for getting into trouble on his many adventures.	
Kyo Sohma	Fruits Basket	Kyo transforms into an orange cat whenever he is hugged by a person of the opposite gender or when his body comes under a great deal of stress. The cat is not in the Chinese zodiac, but legend says would have been if it had not been tricked by the Rat into missing the induction feast.	
Leopold	Leopold the Cat	Leopold the Cat (Russian: Кот Леопольд, Kot Leopold) is a Soviet/Russian animation series about the pacifistic, and intelligent cat, Leopold. Leopold always wears a bow tie even when swimming. He is always confronted by two mischievous mice, Grey and White (Mitya and Motya).	
Lightning Cat	Tom and Jerry	Tom's alley cat friend who is known for his swift lightning speed.	
Luna	Sailor Moon	A dark purple cat who is a devoted servant to Princess Serenity and advisor to her mother, Queen Serenity, and from the Planet Mau.	
Luxor	Tutenstein	Cleo's pet cat and was possibly named after the Luxor Temple. When Tut was brought back to life, he was compelled to be ever loyal to his new "master" and has gained the ability to talk.	
Mama-nyan	The Cat and the Dragon	A cat mother who is raising a dragon and two kittens.	
Manx/Sanctifur	Billy the Cat	A fierce dark gray cat with a scar on his face. He is one of both Billy, Queenie and Mr. Hubert's worst enemies.	
Maomolin	Ranma ½	Is a giant bakeneko whom Shampoo accidentally brought to Nerima inside a giant bell.	
Master Korin	Dragon Ball	A master of Akido, and guardian of the path to Heaven.	
Meathead	Tom and Jerry	A brown, mangy alley cat who wears a red toupee (which is occasionally seen the same color as the rest of his fur). He is generally portrayed as dull-witted and first appeared in the short, Sufferin' Cats! (1943), as Tom's rival. He also appears in Baby Puss and additional shorts as one of Tom's alley cat buddies/foes. He is known as Frankie in Heavenly Puss. In Scat Cats, his final appearance in the original theatrical shorts, he is portrayed with an all-gray color.	
Meow	Space Dandy	A dimwitted cat-like Betelgeusian (ベテルギウス星人 Beterugiusu-seijin?) who is brought aboard the Aloha Oe after Dandy and QT mistake him for a new species of alien. His real name is Me#$%* (pronounced Merowmreowreow).	
Ji Miaomiao	Reborn as Cat	She is saved from her death by a mysterious deity who turns her into a cat.	
Mr. Blik	Catscratch	A black bombay cat who is selfish, vain and surly who insults his brothers with a short temper and cares about money.	
Mr. Cat	Kaeloo	He has a crush on Kaeloo.	
Mr. Jinks	Pixie and Dixie and Mr. Jinks	A ginger house cat with a blue collar on his neck. He frequently bullies the two mice Pixie and Dixie, but occasionally is a good friend to them and serves as their savior in various episodes. His common catchphrase is "I hate meeces to pieces".	
Mr. Jolly	Teacher's Pet	Leonard's neurotic orange cat. He is afraid of the outside world and stays at home with the family's parrot. He's in love with the principal's cat but his fear of the outside world (and her evil nature) prevents any chance of romance.	
Mr. Mumbles	Dan Vs.	Dan's pet cat who is rescued in the episode "The Animal Shelter". Despite the name, Mr. Mumbles is actually female as it's implied Dan never bothered to check.	
Nature Cat (a.k.a. Fred)	Nature Cat	A yellow house cat and the titular protagonist of the series. When his owners are not home, Fred transforms into his alter-ego Nature Cat, narrating himself as such throughout the show	
Nelson	Martha Speaks	Sneaky cat who tries to frame Martha the talking dog for cake stealing, but ends up going to the vet.	
Nepurrtiti	The Loud House	A cat owned by the McBride family.	
Nermal	Garfield and Friends	A mischievous and highly egotistical grey tabby cat who often visits Garfield to antagonize him, first as a kitten and later as a fully grown cat, becoming Garfield's frenemy.	
Nermal	The Garfield Show	A mischievous and highly egotistical grey tabby cat who often visits Garfield to antagonize him, first as a kitten and later as a fully grown cat, becoming Garfield's frenemy.	
Nermal	Garfield Originals	A mischievous and highly egotistical grey tabby cat who often visits Garfield to antagonize him, first as a kitten and later as a fully grown cat, becoming Garfield's frenemy.	
Noir	Nyan Koi!	A black cat owned by the Kirishima twins. She received less attention once Tama was adopted into the family, and became jealous of his near-royal treatment as a rare breed.	
Nyamsus	Nyan Koi!	A large, fat cat owned by Junpei's family, and the one who brings to him the requests of cats in need of his help. She is well known and most cats around Junpei's neighborhood see her as an older sister figure.	
Nicole Watterson	The Amazing World of Gumball	A blue cat and the mother of Gumball Watterson, and one of the main characters.	
Oggy	Oggy and the Cockroaches	A blue anthropomorphic cat, spends his days watching television, lounging around and eating, but is continually pestered and annoyed by three cockroaches	
Opalescence	My Little Pony: Friendship Is Magic	Rarity's ill-tempered Persian cat, also known as Opal.	
Dr. Paula Hutchison Shellbach	Rocko's Modern Life	Also known as Hutch for short, she is a yellow cat that works as dentist, and has also been a cashier, surgeon, veterinarian, obstetrician, and pharmacist.	
Dr. Paula Hutchison Shellbach	Rocko's Modern Life: Static Cling	Also known as Hutch for short, she is a yellow cat that works as dentist, and has also been a cashier, surgeon, veterinarian, obstetrician, and pharmacist.	
Pagan	Extreme Ghostbusters	The cat of mystery-solver Kylie Griffin.	
Pantherlily	Fairy Tail	An Exceed that used to work for the kingdom of Edolas as the Magic Militia's First Division Commander of the Royal Army. He is currently a member of the Fairy Tail Guild and is Gajeel Redfox's cat companion.	
Peg-leg Pete	Mickey Mouse universe	Pete is a Disney cat, and main enemy of Mickey Mouse, and has been in comics and cartoons since the Alice cartoons. He's the oldest character in the Disney community.	
Penelope Pussycat	Looney Tunes	A mute and shy black and white cat. Often chased by Pepé Le Pew, being mistaken for a skunk because a white stripe of paint gets across her back.	
Polly Esther	Samurai Pizza Cats	A female waitress and a member of the Pizza Cats. Her name is a pun on the term "polyester".	
Poyo Satou	Poyopoyo	An orange, round cat and main character of the series. Most characters adore him.	
Princess Carolyn	BoJack Horseman	A pink Persian cat who is BoJack's agent in the first three seasons and former on-and-off girlfriend.	
Proud Heart Cat	Care Bears	One of the Care Bear Cousins. She has turquoise fur (originally pale orange) with a white tail tip, and her tummy symbol is a pink star with a red heart inside.	
Punkin' Puss	Punkin' Puss & Mushmouse	A hillbilly cat.	
Pussyfoot	Looney Tunes	A small kitten who stands by the side of a bulldog named Marc Anthony, who is in love with her.	
Queenie	Billy the Cat	A female cat who befriends and helps Billy.	
Rita	Animaniacs	A sarcastic, aloof and intelligent cat that sings. She also has various anthropomorphic traits.	
Roku	My Roommate Is a Cat	Nana's 3-year-old cat.	
Rubbish	Rubbish, King of the Jumble	An overfed cat with a rectangle head, who lives in the junk-filled attic of an old house.	
Ruff	The Ruff & Reddy Show	Reddy's best friend.	
Rui Nikaido	Odd Taxi	An 18-year old anthropomorphic toy poodle who is the lead singer of the girl group, Mystery Kiss.	
Salem	Sabrina the Teenage Witch (1970s)	Portrayed as an ordinary orange-colored cat who could only meow, with Salem's meows provided by Dallas McKennon, and had limited magical abilities. Also appeared in the films Sabrina: Friends Forever, Sabrina's Secret Life, and Sabrina the Teenage Witch|	
Salem	The New Archie and Sabrina Hour	A sidekick to Sabrina in this cartoon.	
Salem	Sabrina: The Animated Series	Main character in series and its follow-up series Sabrina: Friends Forever and Sabrina's Secret Life. Retains his backstory from the live-action sitcom, including his last name being "Saberhagen", and has a limited range of magical powers.	
Salem	Sabrina: Secrets of a Teenage Witch (2010s)	Sabrina's pet is a black cat, named Salem, who is a spy sent by Enchantra to make Sabrina's life in the human world unbearable enough to live in the witch world permanently.	
Scratchy	The Simpsons	Protagonist of The Itchy & Scratchy Show, a show-within-a-show.	
Sebastian	Josie and the Pussycats	Alexandra's snickering cat, whose black and white fur resembles Alexandra's hair and whose utterances sound the same as another Messick-voiced character, Muttley, but he also serves as the loyal pet sidekick of the group.	
Shermy	Adventure Time	A small, light-gray cat who exists in the future and is close friends with Beth.	
Shiho Ichimura	Odd Taxi	An anthropomorphic calico cat who is a member of the girl group, Mystery Kiss.	
Shii-chan	Kamichama Karin	The pet cat of protagonist Karin Hanazono, who dies at the beginning of the series.	
Shirotae	The Cat and the Dragon	A white cat which wants its own turf.	
Simon's Cat	Simon's Cat	A cat who goes to extreme lengths to get his master to feed him.	
Snagglepuss	The Quick Draw McGraw Show	A pink anthropomorphic mountain lion sporting an upturned collar, shirt cuffs and a string tie with a great desire to be a stage actor.	
Snooper	Snooper and Blabber	A cat detective.	
Snowball II	The Simpsons	Originally Snowball V, there have been many housecats in the show.	
Sparks	SuperKitties	One of the four members of the titular superhero team.	
Speedy Cerviche	Samurai Pizza Cats	Speedy is the leader of the Pizza Cats. As his name implies, he is nimble and fast on his toes, a trait which comes in handy both when delivering pizzas and when fighting crime. He wields the magical Ginzu sword (Masamasa), whose power is unleashed in almost every episode as Speedy's special attack, the Cat's Eye Slash.	
Tama	I'm a Behemoth	A knight who was killed by demons and reincarnated as a young behemoth, one of the strongest monsters in the world, but he resembles a cat. He is Aria's pet, who found him in the dungeon and nursed him back to health. She also named him; however, Aria doesn't know of his true nature.	
Spook	Top Cat	A member of Top Cat's gang. A laid-back musical greenish-brown cat. Acts like a beatnik (in the cartoon shorts) or a surfer (in the feature length films).	
Tora-nee-san	My Roommate Is a Cat	Female Tiger Cat who taught Haru and her siblings to survive on the street.	
Spot the Cat	Hong Kong Phooey	Comic relief Sidekick to Henry the Janitor aka "Hong Kong Phooey". Spot ended up doing most of the work and gets none of the credit.	
Stimpson J. "Stimpy" Cat	Ren and Stimpy	A red and white, rotund cat with a blue nose, purple eyelids, no tail, hands with gloves that have fingernails, human-style buttocks, flat feet, and a brain the size of a peanut. He is portrayed as intelligent enough in some cases and sometimes as nonsensically stupid.	
Stinky	Doug	Roger's pet cat who was later revealed to be a girl at the start of the third season.	
Streaky the Supercat	Krypto the Superdog	Cat who accidentally received superpowers; pet of Supergirl; ancestor of Whizzy the Supercat, who later appears as comic relief sidekick in "Krypto the Superdog", and in assorted other series.	
Streaky the Supercat	Superman: The Animated Series	Cat who accidentally received superpowers; pet of Supergirl; ancestor of Whizzy the Supercat, who later appears as comic relief sidekick in "Krypto the Superdog", and in assorted other series.	
Streaky the Supercat	Justice League	Cat who accidentally received superpowers; pet of Supergirl; ancestor of Whizzy the Supercat, who later appears as comic relief sidekick in "Krypto the Superdog", and in assorted other series.	
Streaky the Supercat	Batman: The Brave and the Bold	Appears in the episode "The Rise of the Blue Beetle!"	
Streaky the Supercat	Justice League Action	Appears in the episode "Unleashed".	
Street cats	The Casagrandes	A vicious gang of Bombay cats that terrorize residents of Great Lakes City.	
Sylvester the Cat	Looney Tunes	Black and white cat who commonly carries out predatory schemes on Tweety and Speedy Gonzales.	
Tama	Nyan Koi!	A small cat owned by the Buddhist monk Keizo Kirishima, in charge of the temple whose statue was broken by Junpei, and an acquaintance of Nyamsus, who also brings requests to him. He goes about the neighborhood and tells the other cats around about Junpei. He is an extremely rare male calico cat.	
Teddy	Simon's Cat	A stray cat living in a box who Cat befriends. As of late 2022, he appears to have found a forever home. Though he lives with a neighbor, the story of Teddy is actually based on one of Simons own rescue cats.	
Tom Cat	Tom and Jerry	An anthropomorphic grey/blue cat who has a love-hate relationship with Jerry Mouse.	
Top Cat	Top Cat	The yellow furred, laid back and clever main character. He wears a purple hat and vest. He often rips off and/or tricks his gang and Officer Dibble. He does respect the effort the gang does for him, but he often takes credit for it.	
Topsy	Tom and Jerry	Tom's alley kitten friend.	
Torakichi	Ohayō! Spank	Spank's friend/enemy.	
Unnamed black cat	Bugs Bunny	Appeared as a sidekick to Witch Hazel in Witch Hazel vs Bugs Bunny Cartoons. Later appeared in Road Runner Coyote cartoon Wizard of Oww 2003.	
Unnamed black cat	Road Runner Cartoons	Appeared as a sidekick to Witch Hazel in Witch Hazel vs Bugs Bunny Cartoons. Later appeared in Road Runner Coyote cartoon Wizard of Oww 2003.	
Vanilla	Monica and Friends	Maggy's pet cat.	
Waffle	Catscratch	A dimwitted and happy-go-lucky cat with an affinity for his many pet newts, his catchphrases are "Spleee!", "Woohoo!", "And Waffle!" or "Liar!"	
Waldo Kitty	The Secret Lives of Waldo Kitty	A "fraidy cat" who enjoys imagining and dreaming that he is a superhero; he pictures himself in a variety of personas, including Catman, Robin Cat, The Lone Kitty, Captain Herc, and Catzan.	
White Kitty	The Powerpuff Girls	The main antagonist of the Season 1 episode "Cat Man Do".	
Yoko	Timothy Goes To School	A friendly gray tabby cat originally from Japan who is typically sweet and is the most warm-hearted child in the school. She plays the violin well and sees the best in people.	

== Films ==
Character	Film name	Notes	Ref
Baron Humbert von Gikkingen	Whisper of the Heart	A living cat statue that only comes to life at night, belonging to an antique shop owner named Shirō Nishi. The character then went on to star in a supporting role in the 2002 spin-off film The Cat Returns.	
Baron Humbert von Gikkingen	The Cat Returns	A living cat statue that only comes to life at night, belonging to an antique shop owner named Shirō Nishi. The character then went on to star in a supporting role in the 2002 spin-off film The Cat Returns.	
Banjo	Banjo the Woodpile Cat	An overly curious and rebellious kitten who, after getting into trouble for falling from a house to see if he could land on his feet, runs away from his woodpile home in his owners' farm.	
Beerus	Dragon Ball Z: Battle of Gods	Purple cat based loosely on Egyptian mythology. He is the god of destruction.	
Berlioz	The Aristocats	A kitten who is Duchess' son and brother of Marie and Toulouse.	
Big Bill	Shinbone Alley	A tomcat who goes out with Mehitabel before dumping her, but later gets back together with her.	
Blackie	Bad Luck Blackie	The title character of the 1949 MGM cartoon short, who offers his services to a cute kitten - whom Blackie calls "Shorty" - who is being tormented by a mean bulldog. Blackie repeatedly crosses the bulldog's path to give him bad luck and prevent the bulldog from attacking the kitten.	
Blaubart/Bluebeard	Felidae	A disfigured Maine Coon who spent his childhood in Professor Preterius' lab and befriends Francis at the beginning of his murder investigation.	
Horatio Bruno	Lackadaisy	Doorman of the Lackadaisy entrance.	
Carlos	Marmaduke	A Spanish-accented Balinese cat that is a friend of a Great Dane named Marmaduke.	
Catbus	My Neighbor Totoro	It is a large creature, depicted as a grinning male cat with a hollow body that serves as a bus, complete with windows and seats coated with fur, and a large bushy tail. The character's popularity has led to its use in a spin-off film, toys for children, an art car, and being featured in the Ghibli Museum, among other products and influences.	
Cheshire Cat	Alice in Wonderland	A pink and purple striped cat with a wide smile and close-set, piercing yellow eyes. Mischievous, and takes pleasure in misdirecting Alice. He is capable of invisibility, and frequently enters and exits the scene with all parts faded away except for his grin or eyes.	
Chizu	Samurai Rabbit: The Usagi Chronicles	A cat ninja	
Chloe	The Secret Life of Pets	A fat and apathetic grey tabby cat	
Claudandus	Felidae	Formerly known as Pascal, an elderly Havana Brown owned by Ziebold, a former associate of Preterius.	
Danny	Cats Don't Dance	A cheerful, naive cat who wants to become a famous Hollywood star.	
Darwin	April and the Extraordinary World	The cynical companion to April who consumes a formula granting him invincibility and eternal life.	
Duchess	The Aristocats	Madame Adelaide's cat and mother of three kittens (Berlioz, Marie, and Toulouse). She falls in love with Thomas and is forced to choose her life at home or a life with Thomas.	
Dinah	Alice in Wonderland	Alice's cat Dinah is brown and white and wears a pink bow.	
Felicitas/Felicity	Felidae	A blind Russian Blue who lost her eyesight as a kitten in Preterius' lab and lives in Francis' district.	
Felicia	The Great Mouse Detective	Feline "Enforcer" for Professor Ratigan.	
Figaro	Pinocchio	Best known as the pet cat of Geppetto and Pinocchio too. Figaro has also starred independently in a number of Disney shorts, as the pet of Minnie Mouse, which was a common theme for Disney characters to be juxtaposed from movies to cartoon shorts. In a "Golden Key" Cartoon Digest of Walt Disney comics, Faigaro had his own page in regard to "Figaro Feline Friends".	
Francis	Felidae	An intelligent and cynical tuxedo cat who is new to the district and befriends Bluebeard and Pascal.	
Gideon the Cat	Pinocchio	A mute, dimwitted and bumbling anthropomorphic feline sidekick who serves as the film's comic relief.	
Mordecai Heller	Lackadaisy	A stoic, cold and calculating gunman who used to work for Lackadaisy before joining the Marigold gang.	
Hermanns	Felidae	A pair of Oriental Shorthairs who act as Kong's sidekicks.	
Jaune Tom	Gay Purr-ee	An orange tabby cat.	
Jesaja	Felidae	A Persian cat and self-proclaimed "Guardian of the Dead", who lives in the catacombs underneath the district and receives the bodies of dead cats.	
Jett Fillmore	GOAT	A female Black panther and famous roarball player.	
Jiji	Kiki's Delivery Service	Kiki's black cat.	
Joker	Felidae	A Scottish Fold who is the high priest of the Claudandus sect. He allows Claudandus to kill him in order to protect the secrecy of the sect. Later, his body was found by Francis.	
Kong	Felidae	A deformed Himalayan cat who antagonizes Francis until his pregnant mate Solitaire is killed.	
Lucifer	Cinderella	The pet cat of Lady Tremaine, who seeks to catch and devour Cinderella's mice friends, Jaq and Gus.	
Mme. Rubens-Chatte	Gay Purr-ee	Meowrice's "sister" and a Persian cat.	
Calvin "Freckle" McMurray	Lackadaisy	Rocky's timid cousin who is prone to sudden outbursts of madness; especially when a gun is in his hands.	
Marie	The Aristocats	A kitten who is Duchess' daughter and sister of Berlioz and Toulouse.	
Mitzi May	Lackadaisy	Widow of Atlas May and the new owner of the Lackadaisy speakeasy.	
Mehitabel	Shinbone Alley	A singing alley cat who dreams of being a star and befriends Archy.	
Mewsette	Gay Purr-ee	A beautiful white Turkish Angora. Jaune Tom's girlfriend. While she is idealistic and naive, she is kind and demure, and believes strongly in herself.	
Meowrice	Gay Purr-ee	A slim tuxedo cat.	
Mittens	Bolt	A cynical feral black cat with white fore-paws, muzzle, belly, and tail-tip. She has three scarred cuts into her left ear. She is the, at first, unwitting companion of the CG animated film's main character, Bolt, and his hyperactive and somewhat insane "sidekick", Rhino.	
Mochi	Big Hero 6	Hiro Hamada's cat, a Japanese bobtail.	
Mr. Whiskers	Frankenweenie	An angora cat transformed into a feline vampire, who makes psychic predictions	
Nhozemphtekh	Felidae	An Egyptian Mau belonging to an "old and new" breed who seduces Francis.	
Oliver	Oliver & Company	An orange orphaned tabby kitten who is looking for a home. He joins Fagin's gang of dogs before being taken in by Jenny.	
Ozone	The Secret Life of Pets	A Cockney-accented Sphynx cat	
Ivy Pepper	Lackadaisy	An educated and confident female cat; as well as Freckle's love interest.	
Puss in Boots	Shrek 2	A supporting character in the Shrek film series, as well as the protagonist of the 2011 spin-off prequel Puss in Boots and main "other fairy tale character" in the animated sequel, entitled The Adventures of Puss in Boots, where he is voiced by Eric Bauza, and related, films. He is voiced in the English, Spanish, and Italian versions by Antonio Banderas. He is based loosely on Charles Perrault's fairy tale character of the same name.	
Puss in Boots	Puss in Boots (2011)	A supporting character in the Shrek film series, as well as the protagonist of the 2011 spin-off prequel Puss in Boots and main "other fairy tale character" in the animated sequel, entitled The Adventures of Puss in Boots, where he is voiced by Eric Bauza, and related, films. He is voiced in the English, Spanish, and Italian versions by Antonio Banderas. He is based loosely on Charles Perrault's fairy tale character of the same name.	
Puss in Boots	Far Far Away Idol (2004)	A supporting character in the Shrek film series, as well as the protagonist of the 2011 spin-off prequel Puss in Boots and main "other fairy tale character" in the animated sequel, entitled The Adventures of Puss in Boots, where he is voiced by Eric Bauza, and related, films. He is voiced in the English, Spanish, and Italian versions by Antonio Banderas. He is based loosely on Charles Perrault's fairy tale character of the same name.	
Puss in Boots	Shrek the Third	A supporting character in the Shrek film series, as well as the protagonist of the 2011 spin-off prequel Puss in Boots and main "other fairy tale character" in the animated sequel, entitled The Adventures of Puss in Boots, where he is voiced by Eric Bauza, and related, films. He is voiced in the English, Spanish, and Italian versions by Antonio Banderas. He is based loosely on Charles Perrault's fairy tale character of the same name.	
Puss in Boots	Shrek Forever After	A supporting character in the Shrek film series, as well as the protagonist of the 2011 spin-off prequel Puss in Boots and main "other fairy tale character" in the animated sequel, entitled The Adventures of Puss in Boots, where he is voiced by Eric Bauza, and related, films. He is voiced in the English, Spanish, and Italian versions by Antonio Banderas. He is based loosely on Charles Perrault's fairy tale character of the same name.	
Puss in Boots	Puss in Boots: The Three Diablos	A supporting character in the Shrek film series, as well as the protagonist of the 2011 spin-off prequel Puss in Boots and main "other fairy tale character" in the animated sequel, entitled The Adventures of Puss in Boots, where he is voiced by Eric Bauza, and related, films. He is voiced in the English, Spanish, and Italian versions by Antonio Banderas. He is based loosely on Charles Perrault's fairy tale character of the same name.	
Puss in Boots	Puss in Boots: The Last Wish	A supporting character in the Shrek film series, as well as the protagonist of the 2011 spin-off prequel Puss in Boots and main "other fairy tale character" in the animated sequel, entitled The Adventures of Puss in Boots, where he is voiced by Eric Bauza, and related, films. He is voiced in the English, Spanish, and Italian versions by Antonio Banderas. He is based loosely on Charles Perrault's fairy tale character of the same name.	
The Rabbi's Cat	The Rabbi's Cat	A cat which obtains the ability to speak after swallowing a parrot, and its owner who is a rabbi in 1920s Algeria.	
Roark "Rocky" Rickaby	Lackadaisy	A compassionate yet somewhat unhinged bard-like violin player and rum-runner eager to prove himself.	
Robespierre	Gay Purr-ee	A young black and white cat and Jaune Tom's friend and sidekick.	
Rufus	The Rescuers	An elderly cat who resides at Morningside Orphanage and comforts Penny when she is sad.	
Sedgewick "Wick" Sable	Lackadaisy	A noble business tycoon and the owner of the Sable Quarry.	
Nicodeme Savoy	Lackadaisy	Serafine's musclebound brother.	
Serafine Savoy	Lackadaisy	Nicodeme's trigger-happy sister.	
Sawyer	Cats Don't Dance	A beautiful, but disenchanted secretary for Farley Winks and Danny's girlfriend.	
Scat Cat and the Alley Cats	The Aristocats	Thomas O'Malley's band of friends. Scat is the talking leader and plays the trumpet, Billy Boss plays the double bass, Hit Cat plays the guitar, People Cat plays the accordion, and Shun-Gon plays the piano and drums.	
Sergeant Tibbs	One Hundred and One Dalmatians	The cat who helps save the Dalmatian puppies from Cruella de Vil and her lackeys.	
Shorty	Bad Luck Blackie	A small, light gray kitten with dark gray markings on his head and around his eyes, Shorty is tormented by a mean bulldog who cruelly abuses him. He later meets a black cat named Blackie who becomes his friend.	
Si and Am	Lady and the Tramp	Unpleasant Siamese cats, who are jerks to the Lady and the Tramp, but never speak any lines of dialogue, and are best remembered for their song, "The Siamese Cat Song".	
Asa Sweet	Lackadaisy	The head of the Marigold gang and business rival of Lackadaisy.	
Thomas O' Malley	The Aristocats	A cat who befriends Duchess (whom falls in love with) and becoming a stepfather of Berlioz, Marie and Toulouse to help them get back to Paris.	
Tiger	An American Tail	A cowardly, long-haired, orange, bushy-tailed tabby cat who befriends Fievel Mousekewitz. He enjoys card games like poker and gin rummy, despite being terrible at them. Voiced by Dom DeLuise.	
Tommy Cat	The Night Watchman	A cat nightwatchman.	
Toulouse	The Aristocats	A kitten who is Duchess' son and brother of Berlioz and Marie.	
Viktor Vasko	Lackadaisy	A short-tempered Slovak with an eye patch who currently tends the Lackadaisy bar and Mordecai's former partner.	
Yzma (transformed)	The Emperor's New Groove	When Yzma accidentally steps on the potion, she transforms into a small, white kitten.	
Dorian "Zib" Zibowski	Lackadaisy	The laid-back but disheveled lead saxophonist and clarinetist in the Lackadaisy band.	

== Other animated media ==
Character	Origin	Notes	Ref
Chococat	Sanrio	Chococat is drawn as a black cat with huge black eyes, four whiskers, and like his counterpart Hello Kitty, no mouth. His name comes from his chocolate-colored nose.	
Nyan Cat	YouTube	Animated pixellated cat with the body of a Pop-Tart, flying through space, and leaving a rainbow trail behind it, originally uploaded in a YouTube video in 2011.	

== See also ==
- List of fictional cats
