= List of fictional cats in television =

This list of fictional cats and other felines in television is subsidiary to the list of fictional cats. This list includes feline puppet characters. It is restricted solely to notable feline characters from notable live action (or primarily live-action) television programmes. This page does not list fictional cats in animation, including fictional big cats, but may include some fictional catpeople. For characters that appear in several separate shows, only the earliest appearance will be recorded here.

Character	Origin	Notes	Ref
Abigail	iCarly	This orange tabby kitten appeared in a 2007 Halloween episode, entitled "Scream On Halloween".	
Angie and Fiddle	The Friendly Giant	"The Jazz Cats", cat puppets who played music with The Friendly Giant and his friends.	
Bagpuss	Bagpuss	The large, saggy, pink and white striped, stuffed cat belonging to Emily and main character of the children's television show.	
Benjamin Cat	Impractical Jokers	A large black cat with green eyes that resembles a mascot. He has a passion for torturing others, mainly Sal, and is Q's pet.	
Bootsy	Leave It to Beaver	A white Persian cat who appeared in the episode "Beaver’s Cat Problem" and is adopted by Beaver.	
Bruce	Honey West	An ocelot the private detective Honey West keeps as a pet in her home.	
The Cat	Red Dwarf	A Felis Sapiens, which evolved from the domestic housecat, is played by Danny John-Jules in the BBC TV science fiction sitcom.	
Carlos	Marmaduke	A Spanish-accented Balinese cat that is a friend of a Great Dane named Marmaduke.	
Cool Cat	Pee-Wee's Playhouse	White cat who plays bongos in the Puppet Band.	
Daniel Striped Tiger	Mr. Rogers’ Neighborhood	Young tiger puppet, the first puppet on children's television, voiced by Rogers. He would later have his own animated series on PBS.	
Fluffy	The Brady Bunch	Cat who only appeared in the pilot episode.	
Fluffy cat	M*A*S*H	A stray tabby cat who appeared in the episode "Springtime".	
Groucha	Téléchat	Cat who is one of the show's news anchors.	
Grudge	Star Trek: Discovery	This Maine Coon cat is described as a "Queen" by her owner, Cleveland Booker.	
Henrietta Pussycat	Mr. Rogers’ Neighborhood	The governess of several nice mice and lives in a small yellow and orange school house supported by a strong limb on the tree, performed by Fred Rogers.	
Isis	Star Trek: The Original Series	Appeared in the Star Trek episode "Assignment: Earth" and is seemingly able to switch appearances from black cat to black-haired woman.	
Kitty	The Closer	Brenda Lee Johnson's adopted cat in the television series The Closer which died on the show and in real life.	
Lord Tubbington	Glee	The male pet of Brittany Pierce.	
Mr. Puss	Glee	Male pet of Hunter Clarington, the leader of the rival glee club, The Warblers of Dalton Academy School.	
Little Murray Sparkles	Sesame Street	Elizabeth's cute pet kitty cat who is adopted to another person.	
Lucky	ALF	The Tanners' pet cat, whom ALF repeatedly tried to eat.	
Madanai	Korenande Shoukai	A maneki-neko, also known as a lucky cat	
Mimsie	MTM Enterprises Logo	Kitten which meowed at end of MTME shows.	
Miss Kitty Fantastico	Buffy the Vampire Slayer	Pet kitten of Tara Maclay and Willow Rosenberg. She is black with white rear feet, a white stripe from her chin to chest, and a small spot of white fur around her nose.	
Monkey	Perry Mason	Siamese cat who appeared in four episodes, including "The Case of the Careless Kitten", when it helped provide Mason with a clue to a murderer. Also appeared in three other episodes: "The Case of the Golden Fraud", "The Case of the Caretaker's Cat", and "The Case of the Silent Partner."	
Mr. Henderson	The Dick Van Dyke Show	Orangey as Sally's Cat in the episode "Where you been, Fassbinder?	
Mrs. Paws	Big Barn Farm	A live-action cat.	
Muffin	Barney & Friends	A wild white stray cat belonging to Stella the Storyteller; only appearing in the episode "Camera Safari."	
Muffy	Shipping Wars	Cat companion of carrier Roy "Nickel holding Up a Dollar" Garber.	
Patatas	Taskmaster UK	A plush ginger Persian cat, used frequently as a prop throughout tasks. He has a twin brother named Huevos.	
Puff Puff	Leave It to Beaver	A white Persian cat who appeared in the episode "Cat Out of the Bag", is watched by two of the protagonists (Wally and Beav), and has to be rescued from a tree.	
Rusty the cat	Mission Impossible	An IMF agent in the episode "The Seal" and played by Orangey, a cat which starred in various films and won the animal acting award named the Patsy in 1962,	
Salem	Sabrina the Teenage Witch (1990s)	Portrayed by a real black cat or a puppet voiced by Nick Bakay.	
Salem	Chilling Adventures of Sabrina	Doesn't speak but only communicates via telepathy, represented in the form of a meow or a hiss, and has very little physical communication with Sabrina, apart from voiced by Luke Cook in one episode, "Chapter Thirty-Five: The Endless".	
Sil-El	The Fantastic Journey	Portrayed by a collection of cats known as The Felix Team.	
Shoe	And Just Like That	A kitten Carrie Bradshaw "adopts" from Che Diaz, who is subletting her apartment.	
Spot	Star Trek: The Next Generation	The pet cat of the android Data. At first, "a long-haired Somali cat" (male) was cast as Spot; later, he was replaced by a female, "an American shorthair, with a brighter basic color", who delivers kittens.	
Toonces	Saturday Night Live	Star of the recurring sketch "Toonces, The Cat Who Could Drive A Car." ("He can drive. Just not very well.").	
Unnamed cat	Emergency!	Gave birth to kittens at Station 51 in the episode "Alley Cat" in October 1973.	
Unnamed cat	Night Gallery	Appeared in episode "The Painted Mirror" when store owner cat that is chased through a magic Mirror Portal into a prehistoric jungle by dog owned by businesswoman Mrs Moore. After the cat sees two dinosaurs fighting, it returns to the "real world".	
Unnamed cat	The Wild Wild West	Appeared three times: as Dr. Loveless' cat in "The Night of the Raven"; as Agent Gordon cat nicknamed "Dennie" [Short for Denver Colorado] in "The Night of the Big Blackmail"; cat in belfry in "The Night of the Fugitives".	

== See also ==
- List of fictional cats
