= List of fictional big cats =

This list of fictional big cats is subsidiary to the List of fictional cats and other felines and includes notable large feline characters that appear in various works of fiction. This list excludes hybrids such as ligers and tiglons.

== Literature ==
Name	Species	Author	Work	Notes
Aslan	Lion	C. S. Lewis	The Lion, the Witch and the Wardrobe	A talking lion, the King of Beasts, son of the Emperor-Over-the-Sea; a wise, compassionate, magical authority (both temporal and spiritual); mysterious and benevolent guide to the human children who visit; guardian and saviour of Narnia. Lewis described Aslan as an alternative version of Christ, that is, as the form in which Christ might have appeared in a fantasy world. "Aslan" is Turkish for "lion".
Bagheera	Leopard	Rudyard Kipling	The Jungle Book	Friendly, loyal, trustworthy, protective, sly, clever, serious and responsible character
Chandre	Lion	Eduard Uspenskiy	Cheburashka	
Cowardly Lion	Lion	L. Frank Baum	The Wonderful Wizard of Oz	As his name implies, he is a lion without any courage.
Grograman	Lion	Michael Ende	The NeverEnding Story	Dubbed "The Many Colored Death" (Graógramán, der Bunte Tod in German)
Guenhwyvar	Black panther	R. A. Salvatore	The Dark Elf Trilogy	600 lb. Astral entity, summoned through a figurine likeness. Guenhwyvar can spend half a day on the Material Plane before needing to be dismissed home to rest. She will also heal faster on the Astral Plane. Companion to Drizzt Do'Urden.
Hungry Tiger	Tiger	L. Frank Baum	Ozma of Oz	A gluttonous tiger who will not eat friends or defenseless beings due to his conscience
Jad-bal-ja	Lion	Edgar Rice Burroughs	Tarzan and the Golden Lion	A companion to Tarzan
Jussuf	Tiger	Günter Eich	Der Tiger Jussuf	The title circus tiger in a radio play
Lafcadio	Lion	Shel Silverstein	Lafcadio: The Lion Who Shot Back	The title character in a children's book
Naga	Lioness	Scott Hawkins	The Library at Mount Char	Short for 'Nagasaki' She is a young lioness who befriends the hero of the story.
Painted Jaguar	Jaguar	Rudyard Kipling	Just So Stories	A jaguar cub who is one of the antagonists of the story.
Richard Parker	Tiger	Yann Martel	Life of Pi	Companion to Pi, originally named "Thirsty" but renamed due to a name confusion with the hunter.
Shere Khan	Tiger	Rudyard Kipling	The Jungle Book	A dishonorable tiger who seeks to devour Mowgli and rule the jungle
Stelmaria	Snow leopard	Philip Pullman	His Dark Materials	Lord Asriel's daemon
Tigger	Tiger	A. A. Milne	Winnie the Pooh	Does not like thistles, acorns or honey, but loves Malt Medicine
The Tiger Who Came to Tea	Tiger	Judith Kerr	The Tiger Who Came to Tea	A tiger who interrupts Sophie and her family's afternoon tea session

== Film ==
- Baby, a tame leopard in the film Bringing Up Baby starring Cary Grant
- Charlie, a cougar raised in captivity and grown to be wild in the film Charlie, the Lonesome Cougar
- Duma, a cheetah in the film Duma and Walt Disney's live-action film Cheetah
- Elsa the Lioness, raised by Joy Adamson in Born Free
- Kumal and Sangha, two separated and reunited tigers in the 2004 film Two Brothers
- Joe and Janet, two lions at the Franklin Park Zoo in Zookeeper
- Clarence, a lion in the 1965 film Clarence, the Cross-Eyed Lion
- Proxima, Frank Wolff's pet jaguar in the 2021 film Jungle Cruise.

== Television ==
- Agapito, lion from Carrascolendas
- Daniel Striped Tiger on Mister Rogers' Neighborhood
- Drooper, lion from The Banana Splits
- Leonie Löwenherz, and her brothers Lambert Löwenherz and Ludwig Löwenherz. A German television series about an anthropomorphic lioness.
- Ludicrous Lion, peddler character from H.R. Pufnstuf
- Clarence, lion from Daktari based on the film Clarence, the Cross-Eyed Lion
- Cleopatra, Theo, Lionel and Leona from Between the Lions
- Shiva, a Bengal Tigress from The Walking Dead
- Cruise, a cheetah in Power Rangers Beast Morphers serving as Devon's Beast Bot partner

== Comics ==
- Adolar, a lion in the pantomime comic Der Löwe Adolar by Becker-Kasch.
- Battle Cat, in the Masters of the Universe franchise.
- Dr. Lion, the headmaster of the school in Jungle Jinks and its spin-off Dr. Lion's Boys, a British comic strip by Arthur White and Mabel F. Taylor.
- Dr. Lion, the doctor in Rupert Bear's stories.
- Galileu, a jaguar in Turma do Pererê
- Herrmann, lion of Jimmy van Doren in Stephen Desberg and Daniel Desorgher's Jimmy van Doren.
- Hobbes, an anthropomorphic stuffed tiger and best friend of Calvin in the comic strip Calvin and Hobbes
- Joe le Tigre, a tiger in Mic Delinx and Christian Godard's La Jungle en Folie.
- Jiba, a tiger in Shinmai Fukei Kiruko-san
- Leo the Friendly Lion, a comic strip by Bert Felstead.
- King Lionel, a lion in Lionel's Kingdom
- Lyle and Lana from Animal Crackers comic strip
- Max, a bobcat companion of G.I. Joe pointman Spearhead in G.I. Joe: A Real American Hero
- Meo, a tiger in History's Strongest Disciple Kenichi.
- Moloch, Corentin's pet tiger in Paul Cuvelier's Corentin.
- The nameless lion who is the sidekick of the nameless shepherd's dog in Le Génie des Alpages by F'murr.
- Nelson, a very old, one-eyed, toothless lion appearing in Western Circus, the 36th album of Belgian comic series Lucky Luke.
- Richie, from the manga One Piece
- Shiva, a tiger in The Walking Dead.
- Tammananny Tiger, character in Walt Kelly's Pogo.
- Tawky Tawny, an anthropomorphic tiger who appears as a supporting character of DC Comics' Captain Marvel.
- Tiger Tim, a tiger created by Julius Stafford Baker.
- Lying Cat, a Somewhat sentient feline, Who detects lies, from Saga.

== Video games ==
- Big the Cat, a supporting character from the Sonic the Hedgehog series
- Bubsy, a bobcat from the eponymous series
- Carol Tea, a wildcat and playable character from Freedom Planet
- Charr, from Guild Wars and Guild Wars 2
- Clawroline, an anthropomorphic leopard who is a member of the beast pack, from Kirby and the Forgotten Land
- El Jefe, from Sly Cooper: Thieves in Time
- Fes from Super Monkey Ball: Banana Rumble
- Gado, Shina, Long and Shenlong, from Bloody Roar
- Guenhwyvar, a magical black panther from the astral plane, in the fictional universe of the Forgotten Realms
- Hunter the Cheetah, from the Spyro series
- Katt and Tiga, from Breath of Fire II
- The Khajit, a race of humanoid cat people, from the Elder Scrolls franchise
- Leongar, an anthropomorphic lion who is the leader of the beast pack, from Kirby and the Forgotten Land
- Neon Tiger, a Maverick from Mega Man X3
- Neyla and Rajan, from Sly 2: Band of Thieves
- Octavio, from Sly 3: Honor Among Thieves
- Pura, from the Crash Bandicoot series
- T'ai Fu, from T'ai Fu: Wrath of the Tiger
- Trap Shadow, a black and purple tiger armed with bear traps who can turn invisible, from Skylanders: Swap Force.
- Tuff Luck, a tigress armed with Traptanium-forged warblades and good luck, from Skylanders: Trap Team.
- Suku, Awilix's jaguar from Smite

== Legends ==
- Dawon, tiger from Hindu mythology
- Maahes, Egyptian lion god of war, son of Bast
- Panther, panther with sweet breath in Medieval Bestiary
- Raiju, a lightning beast from Shintoism described as leopard, tiger or black panther
- Sekhmet, a goddess in Egyptian mythology with the head of a lioness
- Underwater panther, in Native American mythology
- Were-jaguar, shapeshifting jaguar spirit in Olmec mythology
- Byakko, white tiger in Japanese mythology
- The Yali, a mythical lion from Hindu mythology

== Mascots and others ==
- Aubie, mascot of the Auburn University American football team
- Chester Cheetah, mascot of Cheetos
- Exxon tiger, mascot for ExxonMobil
- Leo, mascot of film and television studio Metro Goldwyn Mayer
- Pouncer, mascot of the University of Memphis American football and basketball teams.
- Ritche, mascot of the Rochester Institute of Technology.
- Roary, mascot of the Detroit Lions American football team.
- Paws, mascot of the Detroit Tigers baseball team.
- Tony the Tiger, mascot of Frosted Flakes
- Willie the Wildcat, mascot of the Kansas State University Wildcats.
- Who Dey, mascot of the Cincinnati Bengals American football team.

== See also ==
- List of fictional cats and felines — Mixed list of mostly smaller felines
- List of individual cats — Nonfictional cats
