= Hector the Cat =

Australian road safety mascot

Hector the Cat (also known as Hector Cat, Hector the Road Safety Cat or simply Hector) is a fictional cat and mascot created to aid the teaching of road safety to children in Australia. Educational material relating to the character was developed by the Australian Department of Transport in association with state and territory road authorities.

"Hector's road safety song" became well known in Australia when it was shown as a public service announcement on television. The blue and yellow striped cat first appeared on a school calendar in 1971 with a storyline that he had lost eight of his nine lives due to "ignorance of road safety practices". This was followed by a short instructional film. In subsequent years other characters were introduced in calendars, instructional films, and comic books including Millie, his girlfriend (1973), Uncle Tom (1974), Hector and Millie's three kittens (1975) and his space friend Ding Dong (1982).

A study in 1978 found that, although children enjoyed the characters and stories, the material had a number of inadequacies. It stressed that road safety research findings and child development theory would need to be considered for any future development.

The character is currently used by the Northern Territory Department of Transport to promote road awareness to children. The song "Stop, Look, Listen, Think" is featured in his Road Safety Show.

== See also ==
- List of fictional cats and other felines
