= Allan Melvin =

American actor (1923–2008)

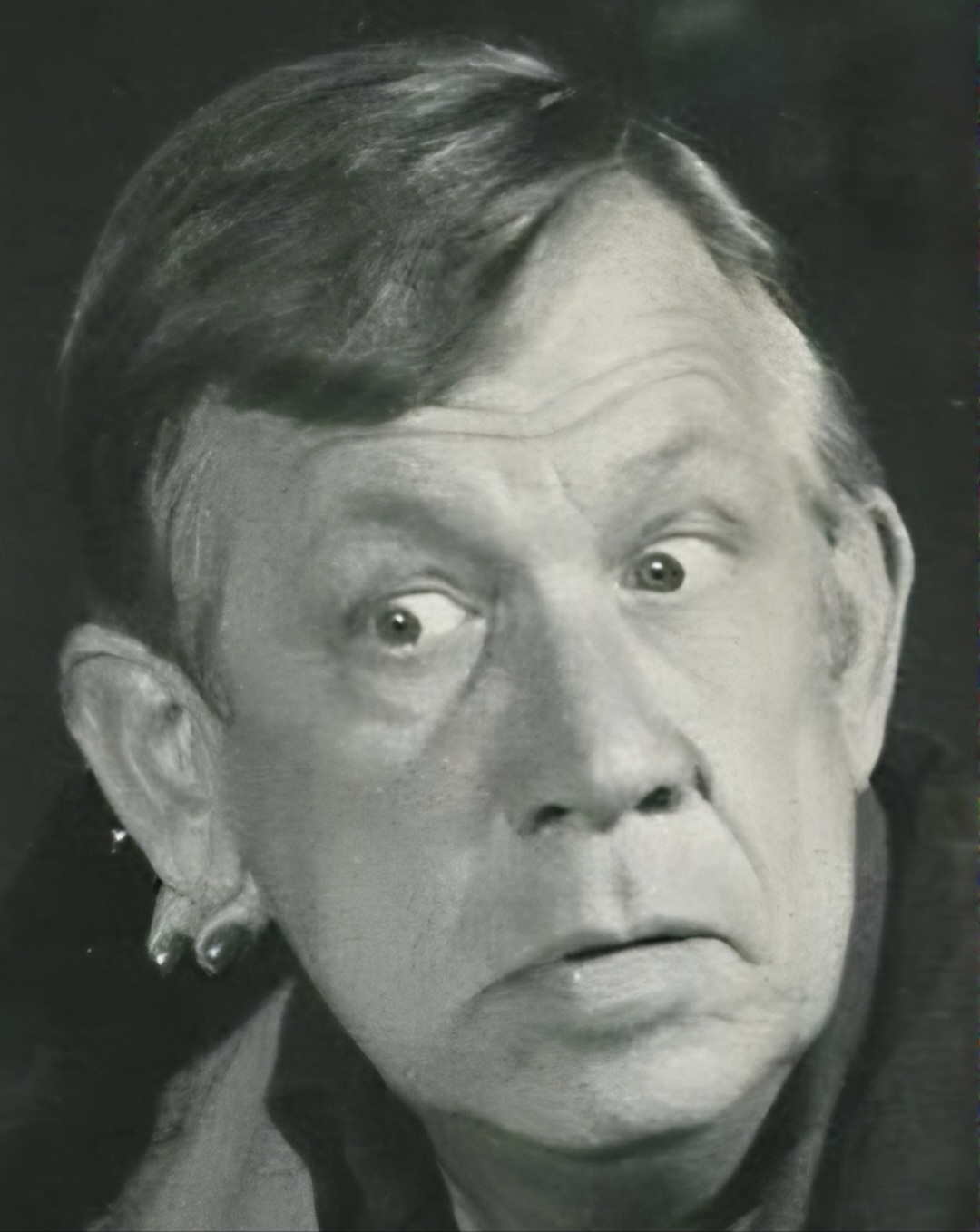
- Melvin in All in the Family, 1978
- Born: Allan John Melvin; February 18, 1923; Kansas City, Missouri, U.S.
- Died: January 17, 2008 (aged 84); Los Angeles, California, U.S.
- Occupations: Actor; impressionist
- Years active: 1947–1994
- Spouse: Amalia Faustina Sestero (m. 1944)
- Children: 2

Allan John Melvin (February 18, 1923 – January 17, 2008) was an American actor and impressionist, who was cast in hundreds of television episodes from the 1950s to the early 1990s, often appearing in recurring roles on various series. Some of those roles and series include portraying various characters on: The Andy Griffith Show, as real estate salesman Pete Dudley in My Favorite Martian, as Corporal Henshaw on The Phil Silvers Show, Sergeant Hacker on Gomer Pyle, USMC, Alice's boyfriend Sam the Butcher on The Brady Bunch, and as Archie Bunker's friend Barney Hefner on both All in the Family and Archie Bunker's Place. He has also voiced Tyrone the Bulldog, an archvillain (with his aliases The Jester, The Puzzler, Poochquin, Sheriff of Sherwood, and many others) in the live-action/animated series The Secret Lives of Waldo Kitty and was Magilla Gorilla on The Magilla Gorilla Show, as well as Drooper on The Banana Splits.

== Life and career ==
Melvin served in the U.S. Navy in the Pacific during WWII. While working at a job in the sound effects department of NBC Radio, he did a nightclub act and appeared in and won on the Arthur Godfrey's Talent Scouts radio show. While appearing on Broadway in Stalag 17, he got his break into television by getting the role of Corporal Steve Henshaw on the popular The Phil Silvers Show program. "I think the camaraderie of all those guys made it such a pleasant way to work. They were so relaxed."

During this period, in addition to his role on The Phil Silvers Show, Melvin was often cast in slightly loud, occasionally abrasive, but generally friendly second banana roles. Melvin was also adept at "tough guy" roles; in an example of his range as an actor, one episode of The Phil Silvers Show featured Melvin doing an impersonation of Humphrey Bogart.

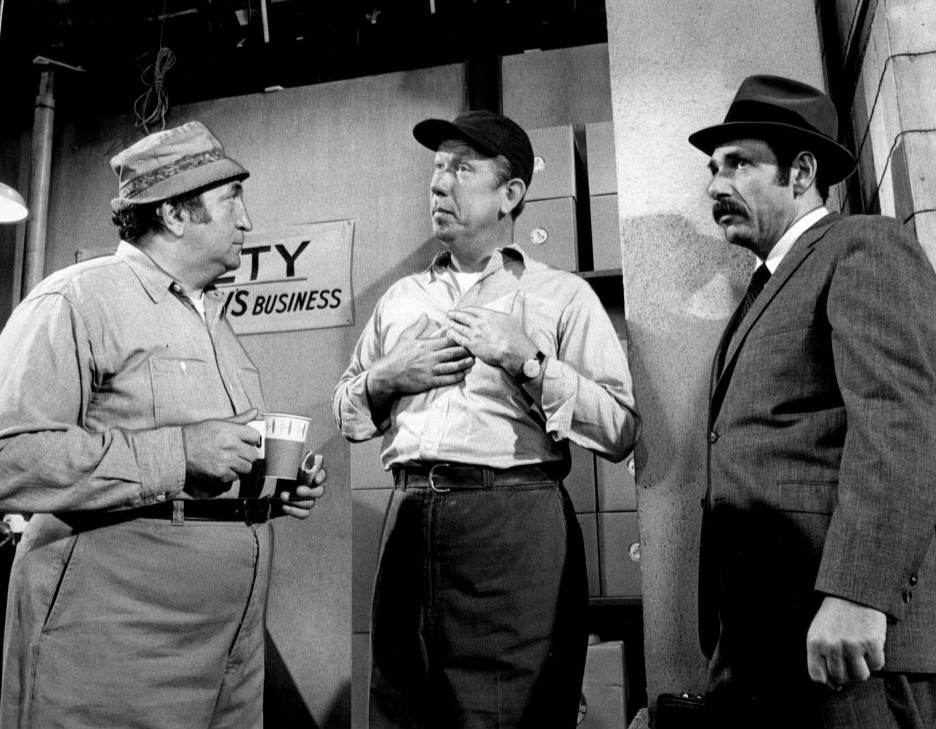
Tom Pedi, Allan Melvin and Herschel Bernardi as Arnie Nuvo in Arnie in 1971

In the 1960s, Melvin worked extensively at CBS for Sheldon Leonard and Aaron Ruben. He made eight guest appearances on The Andy Griffith Show in eight different roles, usually as heavies, and a further appearance as yet another character on its successor show, Mayberry, R.F.D.. He played Staff Sgt. Charlie Hacker, who was Sgt. Vince Carter's rival, for four seasons on the Andy Griffith Show spin-off Gomer Pyle, USMC. He also made eight appearances on The Dick Van Dyke Show.

He provided the voices of cartoon characters Magilla Gorilla and Punkin' Puss on Punkin' Puss & Mushmouse, the lion Drooper on The Banana Splits, archvillain Tyrone in The Secret Lives of Waldo Kitty and Bluto on The All New Popeye Hour. He also made three guest appearances on Perry Mason in various roles, including reporter Bert Kannon in the 1966 episode "The Case of the Sausalito Sunrise." In the same year, Allan played the space enforcer on the series Lost in Space, in the episode "West of Mars".

Melvin is remembered for supporting roles on two popular 1970s sitcoms. He played Sam Franklin, the owner of a local butcher shop and boyfriend of the Brady's housekeeper Alice (played by Ann B. Davis) on The Brady Bunch, and Barney Hefner, Archie Bunker's neighbor and friend on All in the Family. In other contributions to 1970s pop culture, he worked as a voice artist (under the name "Al Melvin"). He provided several characters' voices for the TV show H.R. Pufnstuf and the voice of Prince Thun of the Lion Men on The New Adventures of Flash Gordon. He also provided the voice of Rocky Maninoff for Tennessee Tuxedo in the episode "Mixed-up Mechanics" in 1963.

He also worked extensively in television commercials, including fifteen years as Al the Plumber on Liquid-Plumr drain opener commercials.

From 1979 to 1983, Melvin appeared as a regular in Archie Bunker's Place, in which he reprised the now more important role of Barney Hefner. After the series ended in 1983, Melvin's work was exclusively devoted to cartoon voice-overs. His voice acting career continued until 1994, with Scooby-Doo! in Arabian Nights being his final voice work (again as Magilla Gorilla) before retiring.

== Death ==
Melvin died of cancer on January 17, 2008, aged 84, and was buried at Westwood Memorial Cemetery in Los Angeles.

== Filmography ==
Year(s)	Program/Movie	Roles	Notes
1955-59	The Phil Silvers Show	Cpl. Steve Henshaw; Indian Chief; Benny	143 episodes
1961-66	The Dick Van Dyke Show	Sol Pomerantz; Guard Jenkins; Gun Drummer; Harrison B. Harding; Sam Pomerantz; Sam Pomeroy	8 episodes
1962-64	Make Room for Daddy	Officer Johnson; Policeman; Fake Termite Inspector	3 episodes
1962-67	The Andy Griffith Show	Clarence 'Doc' Malloy in Jailbreak; Escaped Prisoner in Andy's Vacation; Clyde Plaunt in Howard's Main Event; Hotel Detective Bardoli in Andy & Barney in the Big City; Myrt's Accomplice Jake in Barney's First Car; Recruiting Sergeant in Ernest T. Bass Joins the Army; Farmer Neal in Lawman Barney; Fred Plummer in Barney's Uniform	8 episodes
1963	Perry Mason	Carl Jasper	
1963	Beetle Bailey	Sgt. Snorkel; Otto; Zero	Note: He wrote two episodes of the show
1963-66	The Flintstones	Quartz; Jane; Cop; Stony; Sergeant; Elephant; Sportscaster; Len Frankenstone; Bony Hurdle; Mr. Nate Slate; Hoss Cartrock; Sheriff Craig; Boudler; Thug #1; Pig; Superstone; Bugsy; Bartender; Mailman; Head #1; Tom; Car 7 Policeman; Rockarabian Men	13 episodes
1964-66	The Magilla Gorilla Show	Magilla Gorilla, Punkin' Puss	
1964	Hey There, It's Yogi Bear!	Police Sergeant	
1964	My Favorite Martian	Pete Dudley	1 episode, "The Sinkable Mrs. Brown"
1964-65	The Joey Bishop Show	Art Miller	8 Episodes
1965	Sinbad Jr. and His Magic Belt	additional voices	
1965	Secret Squirrel	additional voices	
1965-69	Gomer Pyle, U.S.M.C.	Staff Sergeant Charley Hacker	16 episodes
1966	Lost in Space	Enforcer Claudio / Little Joe / Gambling Machine	2 episodes
1966	Alice in Wonderland or What's a Nice Kid Like You Doing in a Place Like This?	Alice's Father; Humphrey Dumpty	TV special
1968	The Adventures of Gulliver	Bunko; Brunik the Wild Hermit	
1968	With Six You Get Eggroll	Police Desk Sergeant	
1968-70	The Banana Splits Adventure Hour	Drooper / Banana Vac	
1969	Cattanooga Cats	Bumbler; Bristle Hound	
1969	Mod Squad	Fred Croft	episode: To Linc - With Love
1969-71	Love, American Style	Various	
1969-74	The Brady Bunch	Sam Franklin	8 episodes
1970	Pufnstuf	H. R. Pufnstuf; Henrich Rat; Living Island Boat; Orville Pelican; Polka-Dotted Horse; Stupid Bat; West Wind	
1970	Mayberry R.F.D.	Earl	episode: Hair
1972-79	All in the Family	Sgt. Pulaski (1 episode - S2E3: "Archie in the Lock-Up"); Barney Hefner (24 episodes)	25 episodes
1972	The ABC Saturday Superstar Movie	Drooper	episode: The Banana Splits in Hocus Pocus Park
1972	The ABC Saturday Superstar Movie	Magilla Gorilla, Additional voices	episode: Yogi's Ark Lark
1972-73	Wait Till Your Father Gets Home	additional voices	
1973-75	Yogi's Gang	Magilla Gorilla, Additional voices	
1974	These Are the Days	additional voices	
1974	Hong Kong Phooey	additional voices	
1976	Dynomutt, Dog Wonder	additional voices	
1977	CB Bears	additional voices	
1977-78	Fred Flintstone and Friends	Magilla Gorilla, Additional voices	
1977-80	Captain Caveman and the Teen Angels	additional voices	
1978	Hanna-Barbera's All-Star Comedy Ice Revue	Drooper	TV special
1978	The Scooby-Doo Show	additional voices	
1978	Fangface	additional voices	
1978-83	The All New Popeye Hour	Bluto	
1979	The Popeye Valentine Special: Sweethearts at Sea	Bluto	TV special
1979	The Plastic Man Comedy/Adventure Show	additional voices	
1979-82	The New Adventures of Flash Gordon	Thun the Lion Man; King Vultan	24 episodes
1979-83	Archie Bunker's Place	Barney Hefner	94 episodes
1981	Spider-Man and His Amazing Friends	Electro (Marvel Comics); additional voices	
1981-82	The Kwicky Koala Show	Joey Bungle	16 episodes
1982	Mork & Mindy/Laverne & Shirley/Fonz Hour	additional voices	
1982	Yogi Bear's All Star Comedy Christmas Caper	Magilla Gorilla, Additional voices	TV special
1984	Challenge of the GoBots	additional voices	
1984-87	The Smurfs	additional voices	
1985	Galtar and the Golden Lance	additional voices	
1985	Yogi's Treasure Hunt	additional voices	
1985-87	The Jetsons	additional voices	
1986-87	Foofur	Chucky the Rat, Additional voices	
1987	Popeye and Son	Bluto, J. Wellington Wimpy	
1987	DuckTales	Captain Bounty, Mr. Sparks	episode: Bermuda Triangle Tangle
1987	Yogi's Great Escape	Bandit Bear	TV movie
1988	The Good, the Bad, and Huckleberry Hound	Magilla Gorilla, Additional voices	TV movie
1988	The New Yogi Bear Show	Growler Bear	
1988	Disney's Adventures of the Gummi Bears	additional voices	
1990	TaleSpin	Warden Slammer	episode: Gruel and Unusual Punishment
1990	The Adventures of Don Coyote and Sancho Panda	additional voices	
1990-91	Wake, Rattle, and Roll	Magilla Gorilla	
1991	Yo Yogi!	Magilla "Ice" Gorilla	
1994	Scooby-Doo! in Arabian Nights	Magilla Gorilla	TV movie; his final role
