= List of fictional felines =

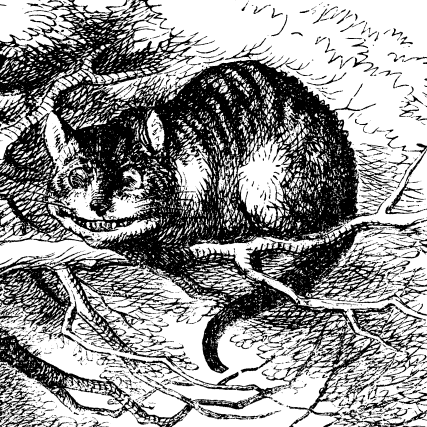
Cheshire Cat from Alice's Adventures in Wonderland

This is a list of fictional cats and felines and is a subsidiary to the list of fictional animals. It includes a limited selection of notable felines from various works, organized by medium. More complete lists are accessible by clicking on the "Main article" link included above each category. For fictional large felids such as lions and tigers, see List of fictional big cats.

== In literature ==
This section covers notable cat characters that appear in works of fiction, including books, comics, legends, myths, folklore, and fairy tales. Any character that appears in multiple works of literature will be listed only once, under the earliest work.

=== In books ===
Character	Earliest Appearance	Notes
Cheshire Cat	Alice's Adventures in Wonderland	Sometimes raises philosophical points that annoy or baffle Alice. It does, however, appear to cheer her up when it suddenly appears at the Queen of Hearts' croquet field. When sentenced to death, it baffles everyone by having made its head appear without its body, sparking a massive argument between the executioner and the King and Queen of Hearts about whether something that does not have a body can indeed be beheaded.
Crookshanks	Harry Potter	The pet cat of Hermione Granger. He is described as having a "squashed face", which was inspired by a real cat Rowling once saw, which she said looked like it had run face first into a brick wall, most likely a Persian. Hermione buys Crookshanks from a shop in Diagon Alley out of sympathy, as nobody wants him because of his behaviour and his squashed looking-face. Rowling has confirmed that Crookshanks is half Kneazle, an intelligent, cat-like creature who can detect when they are around untrustworthy people, explaining his higher than normal cat intelligence and stature.
Pete the Cat	Pete the Cat: I Love My White Shoes	Pete started as a book series, and later became an inspiration for a song and its own television series on Amazon Prime.
The Cat in the Hat	The Cat in the Hat	The Cat in the Hat is a tall, anthropomorphic cat who wears a red and white-striped hat and a red bow tie. The Cat creates chaos when he shows up at the house of Sally and her brother while their mother is out, causing the children and the fish to become alarmed. Just before the children's mother arrives home, the Cat uses a machine to clean up the mess before disappearing.
Snowbell	Stuart Little	Snowbell is a cat belonging to the Little family, of which Stuart is the youngest son. Snowbell has a malevolent attitude toward Stuart, though her behaviour is tempered by her familial obligations. When the Little family adopt a bird named Margalo, Snowbell plots to kill her, predicating her departure. Stuart follows, and his pursuit comprises the second half of the story.
Speaker-to-Animals	Ringworld and Man-Kzin Wars book series	Member of the Kzinti race of anthropomorphic felines in the Larry Niven collection of books. One of the few to have earned the right to bear a name.
Conrad the Cat Detective	The Cat Who Caught A Killer	Conrad is a male calico cat who talks and helps Lulu Lewis, his chosen human who is a retired police officer and lives on a canal boat, to solve murders.

=== In comics ===
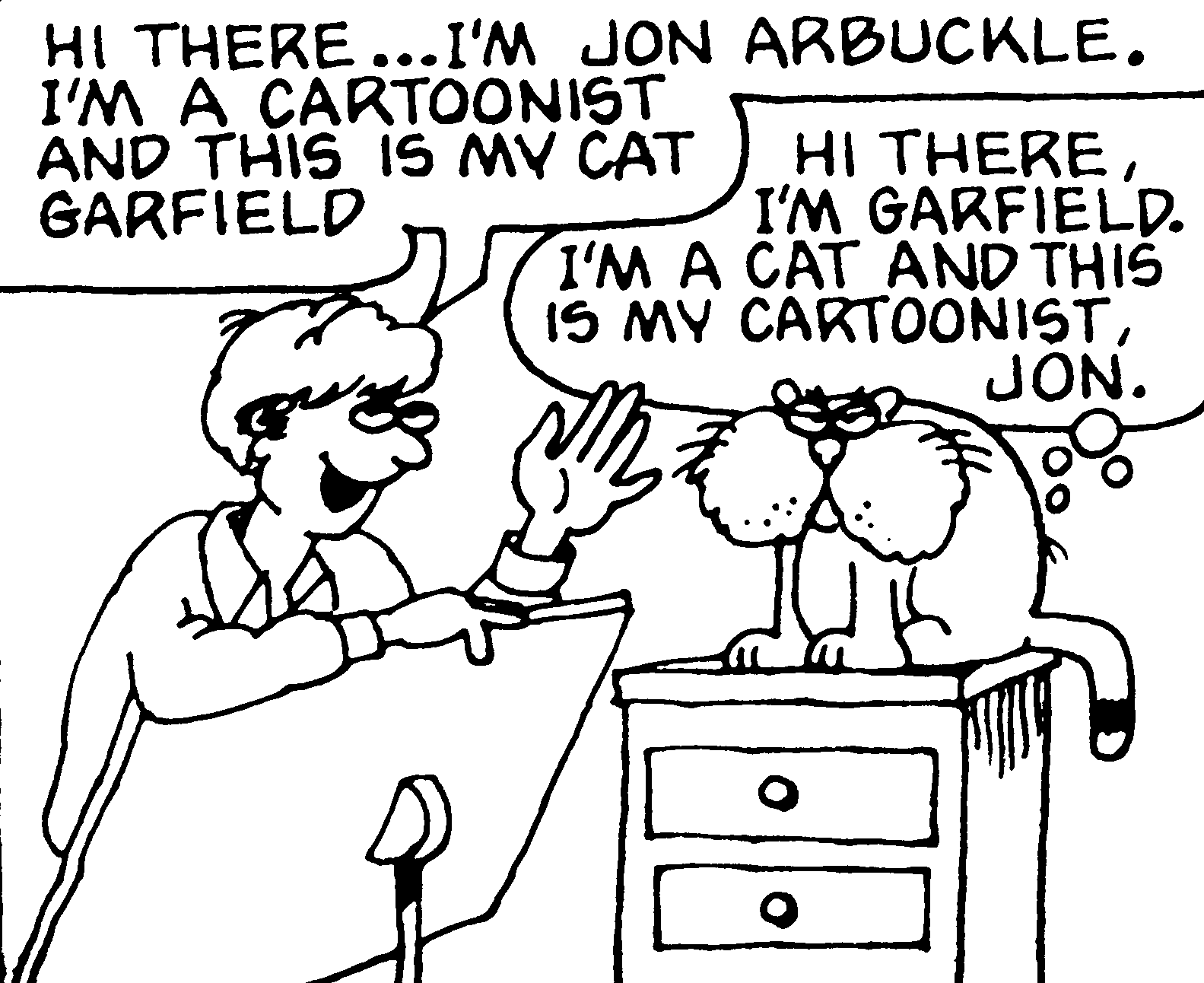
The first panel from the comic strip Jon, that would later become Garfield.

Character	Origin	Notes
Garfield	Garfield	Garfield is an orange tabby cat born in the kitchen of an Italian restaurant, later revealed in the television special Garfield: His 9 Lives to be Mama Leoni's Italian Restaurant. He immediately ate all the pasta and lasagna in sight, thus developing his love and obsession for lasagna. As an adult, he is fat and lazy but extremely intelligent and fond of wisecracks in thought bubbles, with his owner Jon Arbuckle serving as a comic foil for him.
Heathcliff	Heathcliff	A boisterous and chubby but athletic tabby cat prone to wisecracks, causing physical mischief, chasing mailmen, and overturning garbage cans. Other felines from the strip include The Catfather.
Hobbes	Calvin and Hobbes	A plush Bengal tiger and best friend of Calvin, Hobbes is perceived by Calvin as being a live tiger, but by every other character as a stuffed toy. Hobbes, whose name is an allusion to the English political philosopher, Thomas Hobbes, often tries to be the voice of reason for Calvin during their numerous adventures.
Krazy Kat	Krazy Kat	The titular protagonist of the strip by George Herriman, and one of the first cats to star in a comic strip. Sweet, good-natured, and simple, adores the scheming, wily, and antisocial Ignatz Mouse despite Ignatz's constant plots.
Bucky B. Katt	Get Fuzzy	A sarcastic Siamese cat with an inflated ego, Bucky lives in an apartment with his human owner Rob Wilco and a dog named Satchel. Bucky's obsessions include becoming famous, inflicting harm on his roommates for perceived injustices and feuding with Fungo, a ferret who lives next door. Bucky is always drawn with his ears folded back, as if he is constantly in a state of aggressiveness or agitation.
Snuffles	Pearls Before Swine	A Himalayan White Cat who likes to hold and throw grenades. He is owned by Zebra and is best friends with Guard Duck, who likes to make armies and use guns.
Gideon	Scott Pilgrim	A light grey tabby cat rescued and taken care of by Ramona Flowers, and later Scott Pilgrim. As explained by Ramona in the final volume of the comics, he is named after her ex-boyfriend Gideon Graves as “[her] own way of working things out."

=== In legends, myths, folklore and fairy tales ===
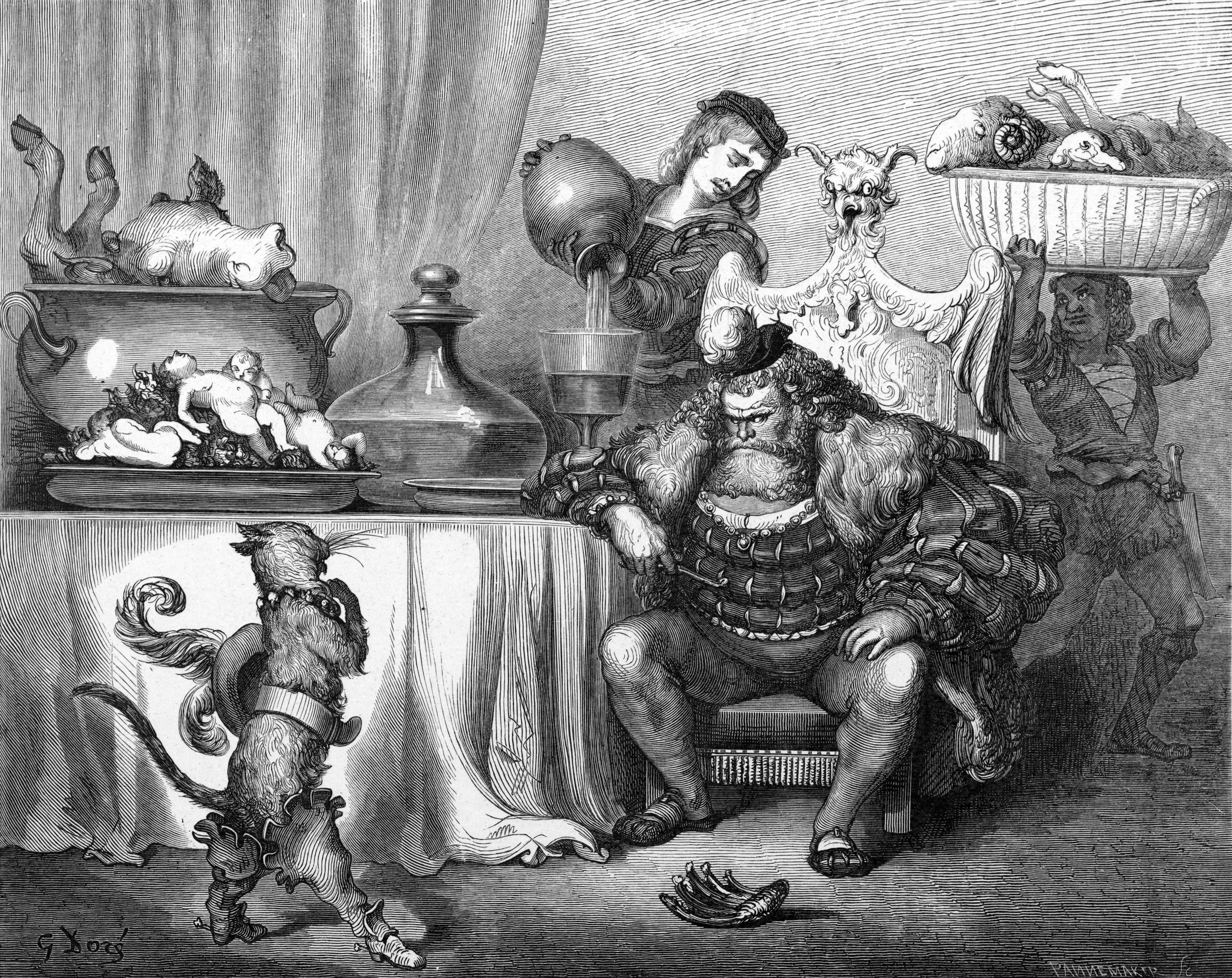
Puss meets the ogre in a nineteenth-century illustration by Gustave Doré

Character	Origin	Notes
Maneki-neko	Various folk-stories	A common Japanese sculpture, often made of ceramic, which is believed to bring good luck to the owner. The sculpture depicts a cat, traditionally a tortoiseshell and white Japanese Bobtail, beckoning with an upright paw, and is usually displayed—many times at the entrance—in shops, restaurants, pachinko parlours, and other businesses. Some of the sculptures are electric or battery-powered and have a slow-moving paw beckoning.
Puss	Puss in Boots	Originally titled Le Maître Chat or Le Chat Botté, this French fairytale is about a cat who uses trickery and deceit to gain power, wealth, and the hand of a princess in marriage for his penniless and low-born master.
Cat-sìth	Various folk-stories	A fairy creature from Celtic mythology, said to resemble a large black cat with a white spot on its breast.
The White Cat	La Chatte Blanche	The White Cat is a character of the Animal Bride cycle of stories (ATU 402). It is present in a variant of the story: French literary fairytale La Chatte Blanche, penned by Madame d'Aulnoy. The character also features as a cameo in Tchaikovisky's ballet The Sleeping Beauty, during Aurora's wedding in Act III.
Señor Don Gato	Children's song	A cat who is sitting on a roof when he discovers that his true love has agreed to marry him. In his excitement, he falls off and injures himself. The veterinarian is unable to save him and he dies. However, as his funeral procession passes through the market, the scent of fish from the market is so strong that he returns to life.

== In media ==
This section deals with notable cat characters that appear in media works of fiction including film, television, animation, and puppetry. Any character that appears in several pieces of media will be listed only once, under the earliest work.

=== In film ===
Character	Origin	Notes	Ref
Mr. Bigglesworth	Austin Powers	A parody of Blofeld's cat from James Bond films.	
DC	That Darn Cat!	A wily, adventurous Siamese tomcat who lives with two young women, suburbanite sisters Ingrid and Patti Randall, whose parents are travelling abroad at the time of the story. In the 1997 remake, the cat is a grey and white tabby.	
Filby	Primer	Aaron’s cat. When missing, called by name by Aaron and Abe during the fountain scene. Filby is most likely named after a character in the science fiction novel, The Time Machine, written by H.G. Wells in 1894.	
Jake	The Cat from Outer Space	A cat-like alien. His real name is Zunar-J-5/9 Doric-4-7.	
Puss in Boots	Shrek 2	A cat from the Shrek franchise, voiced by Antonio Banderas in English, Italian, and Spanish in the following films: Shrek 2 and Far Far Away Idol in 2004, Shrek the Third (2007), Shrek Forever After (2010), Puss in Boots (2011), Puss in Boots: The Three Diablos (2012), and Puss in Boots: The Last Wish (2022). Puss was voiced by Eric Bauza in the six-season series The Adventures of Puss in Boots, and by André Sogliuzzo and Christian Lanz in the video games. Sogliuzzo also voiced Puss in the series of one-minute web videos by DreamWorksTV in which Puss gives advice to viewers, NEW Puss in Boots! by Peacock Kids on YouTube.	
Jones	Alien	Ship's cat of the USCSS Nostromo, commonly referred to as "Jonesy". Also briefly appears in Aliens (1986).	
Pyewacket	Bell, Book and Candle	Siamese cat and familiar of the witch Gillian Holroyd (Kim Novak).	
Smarf	Too Many Cooks	An anthropomorphic cat puppet used in the short, a parody of various other puppets used in sitcoms.	

=== In television ===
Character	Origin	Notes	Ref
Bagpuss	Bagpuss	The large, saggy, pink and white striped, stuffed cat belonging to Emily and main character of the children's television show.	
The Cat	Red Dwarf	A Felis Sapiens, which evolved from the domestic housecat, is played by Danny John-Jules in the BBC TV science fiction sitcom.	
Daniel Striped Tiger	Mister Rogers' Neighborhood	Young tiger puppet, the first puppet on children's television, voiced by Rogers. He would later have his own animated series on PBS.	
Henrietta Pussycat	Mister Rogers' Neighborhood	The governess of several nice mice and lives in a small yellow and orange school house supported by a strong limb on the tree, performed by Fred Rogers.	
Lord Tubbington	Glee	The male pet of Brittany Pierce.	
Miss Kitty Fantastico	Buffy the Vampire Slayer	Pet kitten of Tara Maclay and Willow Rosenberg. She is black with white rear feet, a white stripe from her chin to chest, and a small spot of white fur around her nose.	
Salem	Sabrina the Teenage Witch	Portrayed as an ordinary orange-colored cat who could only meow, with Salem's meows provided by Dallas McKennon, and had limited magical abilities.	
Toonces	Saturday Night Live	Star of the recurring sketch "Toonces, The Cat Who Could Drive A Car." ("He can drive. Just not very well.").	

=== On stage ===
The stage musical Cats features many feline characters known as Jellicle cats.

=== In animation ===
Character	Origin	Notes	Ref
Amanojaku	Ghost Stories	Amanojaku is a demon trapped inside of a cat's body.	
Artemis	Sailor Moon	Guardian to Sailor Venus, from the Planet Mau.	
Babbit and Catstello	Merrie Melodies	Babbit and Catstello are Looney Tunes based on the comedic duo Abbott and Costello. Although the short, fat character calls the other one "Babbit", the tall, skinny one never addresses his partner by name; the name "Catstello" was invented later. In two other shorts they are portrayed as mice instead of cats.	
Diana	Sailor Moon	Child of Luna and Artemis and guardian to Chibiusa.	
Luna	Sailor Moon	A dark purple cat who is a devoted servant to Princess Serenity and advisor to her mother, Queen Serenity, and from the Planet Mau.	

=== In video games ===
For inclusion on this list, the character must have at least one entry of significant coverage in from reliable sources discussing and examining them.

Character	Origin	Notes	Ref
808	Hi-Fi Rush	A robotic black cat created by Peppermint, serving as a pet companion to the player character, Chai.	
Alvina of the Darkroot Wood	Dark Souls	A hulking leader of the Forest Hunter Covenant who is capable of speaking and understanding the English language. She is voiced by Eve Karpf.	
Ankha	Animal Crossing series	A snooty yellow-and-navy blue female feline villager. She dons Egyptian clothing akin to that of a pharaoh, and a necklace around her neck. A king cobra emblem rests on her forehead; in Animal Crossing: City Folk, however, the emblem is of a scarab beetle.	
Big the Cat	Sonic Adventure	A large, purple anthropomorphic cat with yellow eyes and long ears. Big is laid-back and easygoing, which is reflected in his speech.Strong but gentle and a little slow, he lives a normally peaceful life in the jungle with his best friend "Froggy". He loves fishing, and he is never seen without his favorite rod and lure.	
Blanca	Animal Crossing series	An anthropomorphic white cat. Although having a variable gender, the special character is male in Japan, and female internationally. Blanca is known for having a blank face and lets the player draw a face.	
Blaze	Sonic Rush	A lavender teenage girl cat who is a princess of an alternate dimension.	
Blinx	Blinx: The Time Sweeper	A young Time Sweeper and the eponymous main protagonist. He is featured as a support character in Blinx 2: Masters of Time and Space. His enemies mostly include Time Monsters and the Tom Tom Gang.	
Bubsy	Bubsy in Claws Encounters of the Furred Kind	An anthropomorphic bobcat who aims to take on aliens that stole much of the world's yarn balls, including his.	
Cait Sith	Final Fantasy VII	Cait Sith (ケット・シー, Ketto Shī; pronounced Kett Shee) is a robotic talking cat who is friendly, but often unreliable and speaks with a Scottish accent. In Final Fantasy VII, he rides on the back of an unnamed robotic moogle.	
Felyne	Monster Hunter Wilds	A race of bipedal feline warriors. Palicoes are a type of Felyne that serve as a companion to the player.	
Judd	Splatoon	A gray and white cat who determines the winning team in Turf War battles. Prior to the events of Splatoon, Judd was cryogenically frozen and placed inside a capsule that allowed him to stay alive while all other land mammals perished due to rising sea levels. He is accompanied by his smaller clone, Lil' Judd, in Splatoon 2 and 3.	
Khajiit	The Elder Scrolls: Arena	A race of anthropomorphic feline warriors.	
Kimahri Ronso	Final Fantasy X		
Margaret "Mae" Borowski	Night in the Woods	A 20-year old anthropomorphic black cat who wears dark apparel. She is a college dropout and a bass guitarist.	
Meowscles	Fortnite	A muscular anthropomorphic male cat skin and Meow Skulls' brother.	
Meow Skulls	Fortnite	An anthropomorphic female emo calico cat skin and Meowscles' sister.	
Cate Meowdy	Fortnite	An anthropomorphic female cat skin introduced in Chapter 6, Season 2. Part of the Purrfect DIY set, she wears a utility vest and toolbelt, and is the cousin of Meowscles and Meow Skulls.	
Morgana	Persona 5	A black cat serving as the mentor of the Phantom Thieves of Hearts with the code name Mona.	
Raymond	Animal Crossing series	A snooty cat villager with heterochromia iridum eyes. He dons a business suit, a necktie, and a pair of eyeglasses. He first appears in Animal Crossing: New Horizons.	
Rover	Animal Crossing series	The first feline NPC the player meets on a train ride in the original Animal Crossing game. He dons a diamond-patterned shirt with yellow trimmings.	
Talking Tom	Talking Tom & Friends series	Tom is an anthropomorphic grey cat and titular character of the franchise.	
Yuumi	League of Legends	A mystical talking cat and keeper of a book titled Book of Thresholds that was written by her enchantress owner, Norra. She often gets distracted by the sight of either a map or a fish. Voiced by Cassandra Lee Morris.	
—N/a	Pokémon	The Pokémon franchise contains several notable cat characters including Meowth, Sprigatito, Floragato, and Meowscarada.	
—N/a	Stray	The stray cat protagonist and player character.	

== In advertising and animatronics ==
Character	Origin	Notes	Ref
Chessie	Mascot of the Chesapeake & Ohio Railway, and later the Chessie System	Appeared with the slogan "sleep like a kitten".	
Crusty the Cat	Animatronic character at Chuck E Cheese's Pizza Time Theatre	One of the original Pizza Time Players and was present at the original Pizza Time Theatre in San Jose, California. He was replaced by Mr. Munch in 1978.	
Hector the Cat	Mascot created to aid the teaching of road safety to children in Australia	Currently the mascot of Northern Territory Department of Transport to teach road safety to children.	
Mimsie the Cat	Mascot of the MTM Enterprises logo		
Morris the Cat	Mascot for 9Lives cat food	Appeared on packaging and many television commercials.	
Walter (AKA Walter the cat)	Star of 3 Chevrolet truck commercials	Played by six gray, domestic shorthair tabby cats, "Walter" appeared in three Chevy Silverado (Trail Boss) TV commercials in 2021 and 2022. The first one, entitled "Cat", aired during the 2021 Summer Olympics. The sequel, called "Walter in Winter," was broadcast during the 2021 NFL playoffs, the 2022 Winter Olympics, and 2022 Super Bowl LVI (in spots of 15-seconds, 30-seconds, and 60-seconds). Ad-makers and reporters say that Walter the cat does things people would expect a dog to do, but he is a cat, so he showed what cats can do. That included herding cows, swimming, fetching a stick from a lake, digging a skier out of the snow, and chasing a mailman. Walter co-starred with John Hoogenakker. Walter also appeared with Chris Pratt for the same truck in 2022.	

== See also ==
- List of fictional big cats
- List of individual cats
- List of catgirls and catboys
- Working cat
- Cultural depictions of cats
