= Punkin' Puss & Mushmouse =

Hanna-Barbera cartoon aired 1964–1966

Punkin' Puss & Mushmouse is a cartoon produced by Hanna-Barbera and, originally, aired as a segment on the 1964–66 cartoon The Magilla Gorilla Show.

== Plot ==
The show features a hillbilly cat called Punkin' Puss (voiced by Allan Melvin), who lives in a house in the woods of the Southern United States. Punkin' is preoccupied with a hillbilly mouse called Mushmouse (voiced by Howard Morris), who lives there too; and Punkin' frequently tries to shoot him with his rifle. In many cartoons, one of Mushmouse's cousins visits and gives Punkin' Puss a hard time. They are similar to a hillbilly Tom and Jerry chase series.

The "Nowhere Bear" has Punkin' Puss continually disrupting an angry bear's sleep. The episode "Small Change" has Punkin' Puss (and later, a dog, as well) shrinking to mouse-size.

== Episodes ==
#	Title	Summary	Animator
1	Calling All Kin	Tired of Punkin's constant attempts to nail him, Mushmouse summons his family, who confuse Punkin' because of their lookalike appearances.	Credited Animator: Carlo Vinci
2	Small Change	Mushmouse mixes an enlarging draught, which does the opposite of its intended purpose. Punkin' accidentally drinks the draught and faces a difficult fight with Mushmouse, followed by a shrunken hound dog.	Credited Animator: ?
3	Hornswoggled	Mushmouse helps a hound dog from a sticky situation and, in return, he offers to come and help Mushmouse with Punkin'. In response, Punkin' gets his own ally, a skunk, called Stanky.	Credited Animator: ?
4	Muscle Tussle/Gall of the wild (working/alt.title)	Mushmouse is in despair when his cousin, Megaton Mouse, comes by. Megaton drives Punkin' mad with a lookalike appearance to Mushmouse, but unbelievable strength.	Credited Animator: Carlo Vinci
5	Cat Nipped	A stranded lion is invited by Mushmouse to stay with him and Mushmouse keeps him out of Punkin' and Harmony Sue's sight. The lion beats Punkin', eventually forcing him out of the house.	Credited Animators: Don Patterson, Dick Lundy, Ed Parks
6	Army-Nervy Game	After several close shaves from Punkin', Mushmouse leads the US Army to intimidate Punkin' to the point of surrendering.	Credited Animators: Hugh Fraser, Carlo Vinci
7	Seein' Is Believin'	Punkin' takes Mushmouse to the Hog Wallow Research Institute, for some cash. An experiment turns Mushmouse invisible, giving him a tremendous advantage over Punkin', until it wears off.	Credited Animator: George Nicholas
8	Courtin' Disaster	Mushmouse is going courting. Mushmouse, determined to please Hunnybun, confronts Punkin'. All that keeps Mushmouse going is Hunnybun's incentive kiss, until Mushmouse finds his girlfriend after his favours.	Credited Animators: Hugh Fraser, Carlo Vinci
9	A Tale of Two Kitties	Punkin' and his new neighbor, Tennessee Tabby (voiced by Daws Butler), fight over who gets to pin down Mushmouse. Mushmouse sneakily tips the two cats with methods on getting at each other, until they find out they've been duped.	Credited Animators: Carlo Vinci, Hugh Fraser
10	Chomp Romp	Mushmouse receives a package containing a remote controlled mechanical watchdog. After assembling it, Mushmouse names it "Chomper". Punkin's efforts against the Chomper are futile, even when he blows it up.	Credited Animators: Carlo Vinci, Hugh Fraser
11	Catch As Cat Can Day	Today is the day a gal catches a guy. Susie McStomp goes after Punkin', while Mushmouse gives away Punkin's every hiding place to Susie. Mushmouse gets into a similar chase with Hunnybun.	Credited Animators: George Goepper, Kenneth Muse
12	Jump Bumps	Mushmouses' attempts to beat Punkin' with fitness don't work, so he orders a boxing kangaroo, named Hunka Hunka. Punkin' mistakes Hunka Hunka for a very fit Mushmouse and fails every time to beat him.	Credited Animators: Carlo Vinci, Hugh Fraser
13	Nowhere Bear	Mushmouse gets chased by Punkin' to a sleeping bear, who doesn't like to be disturbed. Mushmouse gets Punkin' repeatedly in a punch up with the bear, until he gets annoyed and keeps Punkin' tied up.	Credited Animators: Dick Lundy, William Keil
14	Legend of Bat Mouseterson	Mushmouse's cousin, Bat Mouseterson, arrives for a visit. Mouseterson hits Punkin' for every rude action he resorts to. When Mouseterson has to leave, Mushmouse has to fend for himself.	Credited Animator: ?
15	Super Drooper	Mushmouse tries to contact Super Duper Duper Duper Duper Duper Cat (or Super Duper Duper Etcetera Cat), in hope he'll save him from Punkin'. Punkin' impersonates the superhero, until the real one comes to Mushmouses' rescue, but has to leave for Hollywood.	Credited Animators: Dick Lundy, William Keil
16	Pep Hep	Mushmouse is about to give up his life of feuding, when a package containing Speedo pills arrives. Those give Mushmouse a great advantage over Punkin'. When Punkin' discovers them, he takes an overdose and becomes completely airborne. Note: This episode was, eventually, removed from circulation, as it showed drug abuse.	Credited Animator: ?
17	Shot At and Missed	Unable to take more of Punkin's chases, Mushmouse heads off to town, to apply for a job, involving Mouse-O-matics. Finding himself worse off without Mushmouse, Punkin' sets off to reclaim him.	Credited Animator: ?
18	The Mouse From S.O.M.P.	Mushmouse orders a "Mouse From S.O.M.P." Kit, so he can defend himself from Punkin'. Punkin' gets a similar kit, to counter Mushmouse, getting them evenly matched.	Credited Animator: ?
19	Host of a Ghost	After Mushmouse gets Punkin' knocked out in a feud, he tricks him into thinking he's become a ghost. Mushmouse proceeds to get Punkin' to spoil him, until Punkin' sees through his trick.	Credited Animator: ?
20	Feudal Feud	Punkin' Puss gets a knockout, dreaming of the Feudal Age with Saxon mice and their king, Mushmouse. Punkin' is faced with Meany Mouse and, eventually, wakes up from this dream and resumes feuding with Mushmouse.	Credited Animator: ?
21	Heir Conditioning	Mushmouse inherits from his late uncle £1,000. Punkin' treats Mushmouse better, in hope of getting a share. To their surprise, the inheritance is one thousand pounds (450 kg) of cheese.	Credited Animator: ?
22	Hyde and Shriek	Mushmouse mixes a potion, similar to Dr. Jekyll's formula, which turns him into a monstrous mouse. When Punkin' tries it, he unleashes a mean doppelganger of himself.	Credited Animator: ?
23	Misfortune Cookie	According to Mushmouse's horoscope book, today is Punkin's unlucky day. Sure enough, Punkin' encounters many misfortunes until the next day, which is Mushmouse's turn to face misfortune.	Credited Animator: ?

== Voice cast ==
The voice cast included:

- Allan Melvin – Punkin' Puss
- Howard Morris – Mushmouse
