= Meowscles =

Fictional character from Fortnite

- Fortnite character
- Promotional render of Meowscles flexing for Fortnite Battle Royale
- First appearance: Fortnite Battle Royale (2020)
- Designed by: RexSaido

In-universe information
- Species: Calico cat

Meowscles is a character in the Fortnite franchise, developed by Epic Games. Designed by artist RexSaido as part of an ongoing collaboration between the developer and fan artists, the character was originally conceived as "Buff Cat". He was later added to Fortnite Battle Royale in 2020, as part of the game's Chapter 2 Season 2 season pass as both an in-game character and skin. An anthropomorphic calico cat, Meowscles works for the character Midas as a secret agent. Additional characters related to him were later introduced into the game, such as his son Kit and younger sister Meow Skulls.

The character was well received and described as fighting the game's whimsical atmosphere as well as the breakout star of its season. The combination of his small head and large, muscular body was praised for how well it worked with the game's dance animations. The nature of the design being comical another discussion point, not just in terms of reception but player enjoyment versus competitiveness. Meanwhile, others perceived the character as a LGBTQ icon, with journalist Riley MacLeod discussing design aspects in this light.

== Conception and design ==
Meowscles was conceived by artist "RexSaido" and was originally dubbed "Buff Cat". He had previously been commissioned to work with Epic Games for Fortnite Battle Royale in 2018, developing the Scoundrel and Jailbird characters as part of Epic's effort to include fan artists in the design process. In 2019, Epic Games inquired about Buff Cat and collaborated with him again. The finalized character was introduced into the game in 2020 as Meowscles.

The character appears as a tall, anthropomorphic calico cat, with a cat head atop a well-muscled humanoid physique. He has a gray, orange, and white fur pattern, with a mostly white body and small round black eyes. His outfit consists of jeans, boots, and a gun holster that crisscrosses behind his back and extends down his shoulders. Meowscles has gun holsters on each hip, carrying a semi-automatic pistol. An orange tail extends from his back, and a silver earpiece sits in his right ear. His right arm has a blue heart tattoo with the name 'Lynx', in reference to another character.

In addition to his regular design, several variations were later released, such as Purradise Meowscles, a version dressed in a Hawaiian shirt, shorts, and sandals and sporting long two-toned hair from the top of his head. Others notable inclusions are Phantom Meowscles, which features a mostly black design with pink highlights and large white eyes, and Toon Meowscles, which features a stylized design based on early black and white cartoons such as Steamboat Willie.

== Appearances ==
Meowscles first appeared in Fortnite Battle Royale in 2020 as part of its Chapter 2 Season 2 season pass, appearing both as a character and a skin players could use. In the game's story, he acts as a secret agent working for another character, Midas. Since his introduction, Meowscles has been featured in both billboards and events in the game. Related characters have also been introduced as his extended family, such as his son Kit who utilizes a motrocycle-based mech, and Meow Skulls, his younger sister.

A variation of the character called Meowdas was later added to the game, appearing as a boss players could encounter inside a yacht and resembling a fusion of Meowscles and Midas. Outside Battle Royale, Meowscles appears in Lego Fortnite as one of the game's available villagers. The character has also been featured on merchandise related to the franchise, such as Funko Pops, gaming controller stands, and t-shirts. Several action figures were produced by Hasbro, and Lego produced a minifig as part of its cross-promotion with the franchise.

== Critical reception ==
Meowscles was well received upon release, with Danielle Rose of PCGamesN stating that the design "carved a place in player's hearts" and epitomized the fun whimsy the franchise was known for. Meanwhile, Mark Delaney of GameSpot called the character charmingly strange, and added that despite originating outside Epic Games, it felt like something that had always been a part of the title due to how the character was utilized. However, Owen S. Good in an article for Polygon wrote he resembled "one of those action-figure frankensteins bored middle-schoolers would re-animate" by combining multiple toys, due to the disproportionately small head on his larger body.

Tiago Manuel of Destructoid described the skin as one of Fortnite's strangest and felt it was the sort of design "that the Internet loves, and thus something you probably should never confess your love for in the real world." Raymond Woodsmall of Comic Book Resources described his design as having "an undeniably adorable face paired with the body of a young Arnold Schwarzenegger," a combination he found worked particularly well with Fortnite's dance animations. He further emphasized that the character's appearance represented "goofy" skins that were often avoided due to how highly visibly they made players. However, he found that most players tended to use such skins and that it was often simultaneously hilarious and humiliating to be killed in game by players using them.

Meowscles has also been seen as a LGBTQ icon. Riley MacLeod in an article for Kotaku stated that the character "looks like someone slapped that colon-three uwu emoticon over the stylized gay art of Tom of Finland". At the same time, he voiced approval for the character's friendly appearance, as well as his outfit and physique. MacLeod emphasized that while he was not a furry, he found the character design very attractive and compared elements such as his harness to outfits seen at gay bars. In a later article for Aftermath he stated that several commentators on Kotaku argued that Meowscles could be read as transgender, as most calico cats are female. He appreciated this interpretation of the character and found it helped him to come to terms with his own identity as a trans person.

Variations of the character were also mostly well received, with particular discussion around the Toon variant. Wes Fenlon in an article for PC Gamer stated that it saw positive fan response on social media and led to artists reimagining other characters from the franchise in a similar artstyle. While he appreciated it as a homage to character Felix the Cat, Fenlon felt it made him uncomfortable due to being "too swole" and that the overly long legs by comparison gave it a sense of body horror.
