= The Cat and the Dragon =

Japanese light novel series

- First light novel volume cover

猫と竜 (Neko to Ryū)
- Genre: Fantasy
- Novel series
- Written by: Amara
- Published by: Shōsetsuka ni Narō
- Original run: September 6, 2013 – June 18, 2014
- Light novel
- Written by: Amara
- Illustrated by: Mai Ōkuma
- Published by: Takarajimasha
- Original run: April 22, 2016 – present
- Volumes: 10
- Manga
- Written by: Amara
- Illustrated by: Izumi Sasaki
- Published by: Takarajimasha
- Imprint: Kono Manga ga Sugoi! Comics
- Magazine: Kono Manga ga Sugoi! Web
- Original run: September 22, 2017 – present
- Volumes: 13
- Anime television series
- Directed by: Oh Jin-Koo
- Written by: Mitsutaka Hirota
- Music by: Takahiro Obata
- Studio: OLM Division 3
- Licensed by: Crunchyroll; SEA: Medialink
- Original network: Tokyo MX, BS NTV, ytv, AT-X, NCC
- Original run: July 4, 2026 – present
- Episodes: 12
- icon

The Cat and the Dragon (Japanese: 猫と竜, Hepburn: Neko to Ryū) is a Japanese light novel series written by Amara and illustrated by Mai Ōkuma. It was originally posted as a series of stories on the user-generated novel publishing website Shōsetsuka ni Narō from September 2013 to June 2014, before being acquired and published by Takarajimasha since April 2016. A manga adaptation illustrated by Izumi Sasaki began serialization on Takarajimasha's Kono Manga ga Sugoi! Web manga website in September 2017. An anime television series adaptation produced by OLM aired from July to September 2026. A second season is set to premiere in 2027.

== Plot ==
Many years ago, a dragon hatched inside a cave where a family of cats lived. Encountering the baby dragon, the mother cat decided to raise the dragon as one of their own. As years passed and the cats left him behind, he grows and vows to protect them. However, after seeing cats that were killed by humans for their fur, the dragon takes revenge, killing the adventurers who killed the cats. However, after an encounter with another cat, who reminded him of his past, he develops a cat-like form.

== Characters ==
Nekoryū (猫竜)
Voiced by: Takehito Koyasu
A dragon with an attachment to cats due to being raised by them. Initially angry at humans for killing cats, he changes his mind after a fateful encounter, after which he changes to have a cat-like appearance.
Mama-nyan (ママにゃん)
Voiced by: Kikuko Inoue
A cait sith who raises all the cats and some magical beasts in a forest, including Nekoryu. Also, she became Anne Rosa's familiar and mentor after she summoned her during her school days.
Shirotae (シロタエ)
Voiced by: Fūka Izumi
Kurobane (クロバネ)
Voiced by: Show Hayami
Haibuchi (ハイブチ)
Voiced by: Noriaki Sugiyama
Chiikuro (チークロ)
Voiced by: Maki Kawase
Kurotama (クロタマ)
Voiced by: Shinnosuke Tokudome
Gally (ガリー, Garī)
Voiced by: Atsumi Tanezaki
Anne Rossa (アンネロッサ, Annerossa)
Voiced by: Chika Anzai
Stan (スタン, Sutan)
Voiced by: Junya Enoki
Haneko (葉猫)
Voiced by: Yū Serizawa
Prince (王子, Ōji)
Voiced by: Makoto Koichi
King (国王, Kokuō)
Voiced by: Kazuya Ichijō
Greater Daemon (グレーターデーモン, Gurētādēmon)
Voiced by: Hinata Tadokoro
Monsha-Mosha IV (四代目モシャモシャ, Yondaime Moshamosha)
Voiced by: Yōji Ueda
Mike-Mike (ミケミケ, Mikemike)
Voiced by: Saho Shirasu
Monaruka (Black) (モナルカ（黒）, Monaruka (Kuro))
Voiced by: Natsuki Hanae
Pomupora (ポムポラ)
Voiced by: Tomohisa Asō

== Media ==
=== Light novel ===
Written by Amara, The Cat and the Dragon was originally posted as a series of stories on the user-generated novel publishing website Shōsetsuka ni Narō from September 6, 2013, to June 18, 2014. It was later acquired and published by Takarajimasha with illustrations by Mai Ōkuma on April 22, 2016, with nine volumes released as of August 26, 2026.

No.	Title	Japanese release date	Japanese ISBN
1	Neko to Ryū (猫と竜)	April 22, 2016	978-4-8002-5301-9
2	Neko to Ryū to Bōken О̄ji to Gūtara Shōjo (猫と竜と冒険王子とぐうたら少女)	January 7, 2017	978-4-8002-6564-7
3	Neko no Eiyū to Mahō Gakkō (猫の英雄と魔法学校)	July 13, 2018	978-4-8002-8550-8
4	Ryū no Omiai to Soratobu Neko (竜のお見合いと空飛ぶ猫)	February 10, 2020	978-4-299-00250-1
5	Ryū to Akuma to Haha Neko (竜と悪魔と母猫)	August 6, 2021	978-4-299-01967-7
6	Ōji to Ryū to Shichieiyū (王子と竜と七英雄)	November 12, 2021	978-4-299-02250-9
7	Nekojarashi Hata to Sumeragi Ryū e no Okurimono (ねこじゃらし畑と皇竜への贈りもの)	January 20, 2023	978-4-299-03872-2
8	Ibun Shichieiyū no Tabidachi (異聞 七英雄の旅立ち)	April 12, 2025	978-4-299-06712-8
9	Bōken Neko no Kikan to Ōto no Nichijō (冒険猫の帰還と王都の日常)	November 26, 2025	978-4-299-07363-1
10	Hyakudai no Kagetsu to Ryū no Kosodate (百代の過月と竜の子育て)	August 26, 2026	978-4-299-08071-4

=== Manga ===
A manga adaptation illustrated by Izumi Sasaki began serialization on Takarajimasha's Kono Manga ga Sugoi! Web manga website on September 22, 2017, with its chapters compiled into thirteen tankōbon volumes as of July 2026.

No.	Japanese release date	Japanese ISBN
1	January 20, 2018	978-4-8002-7986-6
2	June 23, 2018	978-4-8002-8436-5
3	March 6, 2019	978-4-8002-9305-3
4	April 11, 2020	978-4-299-00414-7
5	November 24, 2020	978-4-299-01069-8
6	August 11, 2021	978-4-299-01926-4
7	April 13, 2022	978-4-299-02934-8
8	February 15, 2023	978-4-299-03958-3
9	September 22, 2023	978-4-299-04707-6
10	June 13, 2024	978-4-299-05580-4
11	April 3, 2025	978-4-299-06674-9
12	November 21, 2025	978-4-299-07323-5
13	July 24, 2026	978-4-299-08015-8

=== Anime ===
An anime television series adaptation was announced on National Cat Day on February 22, 2025. It is produced by OLM and directed by Oh Jin-Koo, with series composition handled by Mitsutaka Hirota, characters designed by Rie Nishino and Chiaki Kurakazu, and music composed by Takahiro Obata. The series aired from July 4 to September 19, 2026, on Tokyo MX and other networks. The opening theme song is "Nekohi" (猫日; 'Cat Day'), performed by Suis from Yorushika, while the ending theme song is "Tadaima no Basho" (ただいまの場所; 'A Place to Call Home'), performed by Lia of Shallm. Crunchyroll is streaming the series. Medialink licensed the series in Southeast Asia for streaming on Ani-One Asia's YouTube channel.

A second season was announced after the finale of the first season. It is set to premiere in 2027.

==== Episodes ====
No.	Title	Directed by	Written by	Storyboarded by	Original release date (Note: Episodes are released on dAnime Store, ABEMA, Crunchyroll and Ani-One Asia a week before their televised airings.)
1	"The Cat and the Dragon"; Transliteration: "Neko to Ryū" (Japanese: 猫と竜)	Oh Jin-Koo	Mitsutaka Hirota	Oh Jin-Koo	July 4, 2026
2	"The Mother Cat and the Girl"; Transliteration: "Haha Neko to Shōjo" (Japanese: 母猫と少女)	Kazuya Fujishiro	Mitsutaka Hirota	Oh Jin-Koo	July 11, 2026
3	"The Kittens and the Winged Uncle"; Transliteration: "Koneko-tachi to Hane no Oji-chan" (Japanese: 子猫達と羽のおじちゃん)	Yūki Nishiyama	Mitsutaka Hirota	Oh Jin-Koo	July 18, 2026
4	"The Black Cat and the Prince"; Transliteration: "Kuroneko to Ōji" (Japanese: 黒猫と王子)	Oh Jin-Koo	Daisuke Tazawa	Takeshi Mori	July 25, 2026
5	"The White Cat and the Girl"; Transliteration: "Shironeko to Shōjo" (Japanese: 白猫と少女)	Konomi Tezuka	Mitsutaka Hirota	Yūichi Nihei	August 1, 2026
6	"The Evening of Foxtails"; Transliteration: "Neko Jarashi no Yoru" (Japanese: 猫じゃらしの夜)	Hong Pei Ni	Mitsutaka Hirota	Atsushi Ōtsuki	August 8, 2026
7	"The Return of the Mother Cat"; Transliteration: "Haha Neko no Kikan" (Japanese: 母猫の帰還)	Tsuyoshi Nakano	Megumi Sasano	Oh Jin-Koo	August 15, 2026
8	"Life in the Castle Town"; Transliteration: "Jōka-machi no Seikatsu" (Japanese: 城下町の生活)	Masahiko Suzuki (AD)	Daisuke Tazawa	Takeshi Mori	August 22, 2026
8	"The Black Cat and the Adventurous Prince"; Transliteration: "Kuroneko to Bōken Ōji" (Japanese: 黒猫と冒険王子)	Masahiko Suzuki (AD)	Daisuke Tazawa	Takeshi Mori	August 22, 2026
9	"The White Cat and the Lazy Girl"; Transliteration: "Shironeko to Gūtara Shōjo" (Japanese: 白猫とぐうたら少女)	Kazuya Fujishiro	Daisuke Tazawa	Takeshi Mori	August 29, 2026
10	"The Demon and the Dragon and Mother's Day"; Transliteration: "Akuma to Ryū to Haha no Hi" (Japanese: 悪魔と竜と母の日)	Konomi Tezuka	Megumi Sasano	Yūichi Nihei	September 5, 2026
11	"Final Resting Place"; Transliteration: "Owari no Nedoko" (Japanese: 終の寝床)	Ryūsei Koyano	Mitsutaka Hirota	Atsushi Ōtsuki	September 12, 2026
12	"Festival of Cats and Sounds"; Transliteration: "Neko to Ō Miyako no Matsuri" (Japanese: 猫と王都の祭り)	Tsuyoshi Nakano	Mitsutaka Hirota	Tsuyoshi Nakano	September 19, 2026

== Reception ==
By April 2025, the series had over 1 million copies in circulation. As of November 2026, the anime has received a score of 7.82 on MyAnimeList and is ranked 1145 out of all the anime in the collections.
