= Dawon =

Mount of the Hindu goddess Durga

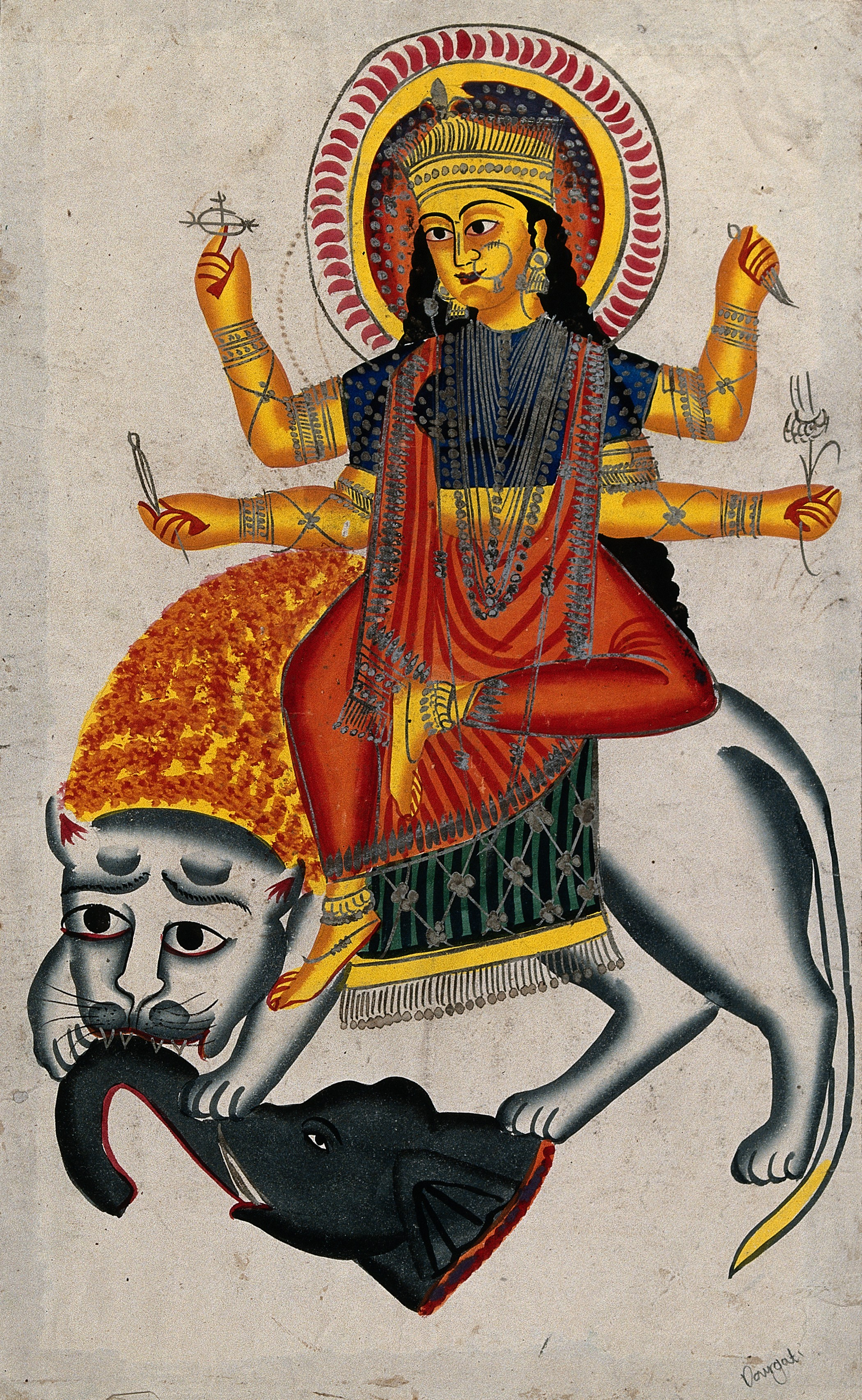
Durga upon her lion mount, Dawon

Dawon also known as Somnandi is either a lion or a tiger that serves as the mount of the Hindu major goddess Durga in Hindu traditions. As Mother Durga fights with demon Mahishasura, she steps one feet on Somnandi and other feet on Mahishasura to kill him for the upliftment of dharma. According to some Hindu spiritual texts like Kalika purana, Somnandi or Mother Durga's lion is believed to be Vishnu himself.

Dawon has often been represented in traditional and ancient Bengali culture and Indian culture in the form of Ghatokbahini (Bengali: ঘটকবাহিনী সিংহ), i.e. in the form of a half-lion, half-tiger hybrid, like a liger. It is a sacred tiger in Tibetan lore, and was later known as 'Gdon.

== See also ==
- Durga
- Vahana
- Shesha
