= Señor Don Gato =

Children's song

"Señor Don Gato" is a children's song about a cat who is sitting on a roof reading a letter from his true love who has agreed to marry him. In his excitement, he falls off and injures himself. The veterinarian is unable to save him and he dies. However, as his funeral procession passes through the market, the scent of fish from the market is so strong that he returns to life.

This English version, by Margaret Marks, is familiar to generations of school-age children in North America due to its inclusion in Making Music Your Own, Grade 3 (copyright 1964 by the Silver Burdett Company). The lyrics are loosely translated from the traditional Spanish song "Estaba el señor Don Gato", but the melody is from a different song, "Ahora Que Vamos Despacio". There is also a French version of "Estaba el señor Don Gato" called "Monsieur le Chat".
