= The Secret Lives of Waldo Kitty =

American television series

- Genre: Animation; Live action
- Created by: Lorna Smith
- Directed by: Don Christensen; Rudy Larriva
- Voices of: Howard Morris; Jane Webb; Allan Melvin
- Theme music composer: Yvette Blais; Jeff Michael
- Country of origin: United States
- Original language: English
- No. of seasons: 1
- No. of episodes: 13

Production
- Producers: Lou Scheimer; Norm Prescott
- Running time: 30 minutes
- Production company: Filmation

Original release
- Network: NBC
- Release: September 6 – November 29, 1975

The Secret Lives of Waldo Kitty (later called The New Adventures of Waldo Kitty) is an American animated and partially live-action television series, produced by Filmation, which originally aired for one season on Saturday mornings on NBC from September 6 to November 29, 1975. Howard Morris, Jane Webb, and Allan Melvin provided voices for the three main characters on the series. The show follows a cat named Waldo who daydreams of being a superhero and defeating the villainous bulldog Tyrone. It was inspired by James Thurber's 1939 short story "The Secret Life of Walter Mitty". In 1975, Thurber's widow, Helen Thurber, sued Filmation for creating the series without the permission of her husband's estate. The lawsuit resulted in the series being retitled in reruns as The New Adventures of Waldo Kitty.

The Secret Lives of Waldo Kitty was produced by Lou Scheimer and Norm Prescott and directed by Don Christensen and Rudy Larriva. Critically, a positive response was aimed at the show's imaginative story lines and its ability to parody pop culture events well. However, producer Scheimer was upset by the series' final result, listing the issues that arose during production and the minimal number of episodes produced as reasons for this, among others. The series has a total of just 13 episodes. In 1989, three episodes from The Secret Lives of Waldo Kitty were featured on a VHS tape released by United American Video.

== Premise and description ==
The series was inspired by Walter Mitty, the main character in James Thurber's 1939 short story "The Secret Life of Walter Mitty". Each episode began with live action footage of Waldo and Felicia, who were usually being bullied by Tyrone. Waldo would then daydream about being a superhero and coming to the rescue of others. The series contained a lot of satire per the request of Filmation and cited television series Rowan & Martin's Laugh-In and magazine Mad as the reason why.

== Characters ==
The series features the following three main characters throughout its run:

- Howard Morris as Waldo, a "fraidy cat" who enjoys imagining and dreaming that he is a superhero; he pictures himself in a variety of personas, including Catman, Robin Cat, The Lone Kitty, Captain Herc, and Catzan.
- Jane Webb as Felicia, a cat who is Waldo's girlfriend and trusty companion. During the animation portions of the show, she is usually held captive or kidnapped by Tyrone and eventually rescued by Waldo.
- Allan Melvin as Tyrone, an evil English bulldog. He generally bullies Waldo and Felicia in each episode, during both the animated and live action segments. Scheimer selected Melvin to voice Tyrone as he had "a hoarse [and] very deep voice".

== Production and filming ==
The concept for The Secret Lives of Waldo Kitty was first developed by Lorna Smith, who was in charge of the layout of several Filmation series at the time. Being a "big cat lover", she suggested to Scheimer that they create a series led by cats; however, according to Scheimer, he didn't remember their conversation but because "she raised a fuss" regarding the issue, Smith ultimately received credit for the idea in the show's credits. Scheimer claimed in a 2012 autobiography, co-written by Andy Mangels, that the production of the series was also problematic. In 1974, NBC reduced the episode orders on its green-lit series from sixteen to thirteen episodes, which Scheimer felt made it very difficult to sell the show to different markets around the world. He said that with just thirteen episodes, "you were always taking a chance that you were producing something that was going to have no value except on commercial television in the United States".

Executively produced by Lou Scheimer and Norm Prescott's Filmation, Don Christensen and Rudy Larriva served as the series' two directors. Additionally, Jim Ryan and Bill Danch contributed as head writers to the series, while Ray Ellis (under the alias name Yvette Blais) and Jeff Michael composed the opening theme music for the show. Since the series' title and story were a play on Thurber's short story without the permission of his estate, his wife Helen Thurber filed a lawsuit against Filmation in 1975. She cited that the company "debas[ed] and distort[ed]" her late husband's story. Due to the controversy, Filmation ultimately settled with Thurber and changed the title to The New Adventures of Waldo Kitty in syndication.

In the early 1970s, Filmation began producing several new series for the Big Three television networks. They started creating live action series, instead of just animation ones, and also series that combined both. While a majority of the series was animated, live-action segments involving actual animals were also included to separate different scenes in an episode. According to Scheimer, filming with the animals was tough, as the bulldog who portrayed Tyrone would often chase the cats on set around and not stay still during filming.

== Episodes ==
No.	Title	Original release date
1	"Cat Man"	September 6, 1975
Daydreaming as Catman, Waldo learns that Tyrone is holding Felicia captive in a cage in an abandoned barn. Despite being under the watch of Tyrone's friends, Catman tries different methods to come to Felicia's rescue and save her.
2	"Catzan of the Apes"	September 13, 1975
Catzan, a protector of the jungle he resides in, learns that Tyrone plans to reutilize space in the jungle to make way for construction. So Tyrone chases Catzan down in hopes that his plan will go through as planned without any interference.
3	"The Lone Kitty"	September 20, 1975
A cowboy-version of Tyrone and his crew begin terrorizing the inhabitants of a small rural, desert town with their horses, so the Lone Kitty promises to save the town and lock up Tyrone and his friends for good.
4	"Robin Cat"	September 27, 1975
A hungry pig king, who is the ruler of a kingdom, sends Tyrone on a mission to catch the infamous Robin Cat, who has been stealing food and wealth from the queen and distributing it to the poor. Tyrone and his gang vows to track down him and return the food and her goods to her.
5	"Cat Trek"	October 4, 1975
In a parody of Star Trek, Waldo and his friends aboard a spaceship which is actively being watched and followed by a spaceship named Tyronious. Tyrone, the leader of this spaceship, threatens Waldo to give up his own ship or face the consequences, but all of Tyrone's attempts to gain his hovercraft are unsuccessful.
6	"Cat Man Meets the Poochquin"	October 11, 1975
Tyrone a.k.a. the Poochquin locks Felicia up in a prison, hoping to gain the attention of her uncle, their town's mayor. Catman and his friend Sparrow, a yellow sparrow bird, travel around the city in search of Felicia; the major, impatiently waiting for his niece's return, also becomes locked up in a trap set by Tyrone.
7	"Catzan or Not Catzan"	October 18, 1975
While adventuring in the jungle with Sparrow, Catzan comes across Tyrone who has returned to hunt the various species of animals that live there; in order to save the other animals, Catzan cleverly leads Tyrone's gang out of the jungle without them even knowing it.
8	"The Lone Kitty Rides Again"	October 25, 1975
The Lone Kitty returns to save Felicia, who was recently captured by Tyrone while wandering in the desert. With his trusty horse Sterling and a rabbit named Pronto, he visits an old jailhouse to save Felicia and lock up Tyrone for good.
9	"Sheriff of Sherwood"	November 1, 1975
Awarded as "Sheriff of the Day", Robin Cat patrols Sherwood and finds out that Tyrone is scheming a way to mess with his special award; he decides to stop his plans before anything serious occurs.
10	"Cat Man Meets the Puzzler"	November 8, 1975
Tyrone, who has become the super-villain known as the Puzzler, kidnaps Felicia and holds her in his underground lair, so Catman must step in and save the day.
11	"Dr. Livingstone, I Perfume?"	November 15, 1975
Tyrone, who overheard about the powerful Dr. Livingstone, is wanting to track him down so he can obtain his secret oil, which is capable of producing large quantities of an expensive perfume. Catzan, on the other hand, vows to stop Tyrone before any harm is done.
12	"Ping or Pongo"	November 22, 1975
While traveling throughout the Solar System, Waldo learns that Tyrone is, once again, searching for his spaceship. Tyrone hopes to scare Waldo away by using a hologram to produce an artificial version of him, so Waldo (as Captain Herc) similarly creates an android version of himself which is used to frighten Tyrone and his crew.
13	"Chaw the Bullet"	November 29, 1975
The Lone Kitty and his rabbit companion Pronto must work together to stop Tombstone Tyrone and his henchdogs from taking over a settlement of land in the Old West.

== Reception ==
=== Broadcast history ===
The Secret Lives of Waldo Kitty was broadcast on NBC as part of their Saturday morning children's lineup between September 6 and November 29, 1975, and before being cancelled, it continued to air regularly on the network until September 4, 1976. In March 1976, Filmation received news from NBC that they had decided not to renew the series for a second season and instead chose to focus on "spread[ing] their schedule between reruns of vintage toons and new live-action shows". At its original allocated time slot, the series aired immediately after syndicated repeats of Josie and the Pussycats (1970–1971) and right before new episodes of The Pink Panther Show (1969–1980).

In August 1989, United American Video released several Filmation series on VHS in the United States. As part of their limited line of "budget" VHS tapes, they released The Secret Lives of Waldo Kitty, Groovie Goolies (1970), Fat Albert and the Cosby Kids (1972–1985), My Favorite Martians (1973), Space Sentinels (1977), and Blackstar (1981) for the first time ever. The tape featuring The Secret Lives of Waldo Kitty contained just three of the thirteen episodes.

=== Critical reception ===
Many years later, authors Timothy Burke and Kevin Burke wrote in Saturday Morning Fever: Growing Up with Cartoon Culture called the show a "special treat" and appreciated it for being able to parody "pop culture stables" cleverly. They enjoyed that Waldo was selected as the main character because there was "no more perfect a character for kids to empathize with than a shy dreamer who lives out a thousand adventures in his or her head". They also speculated that Wishbone (1995–1997) contained the same premise as The Secret Lives of Waldo Kitty, but with a dog as the main character instead of a cat. Producer Scheimer was hugely disappointed by the entire series, calling it "a mistake on many levels".
