= Lord Tubbington =

Bengal cat known for role on the television series Glee

- Other name: Aragon
- Species: Felis catus
- Breed: Bengal cat
- Sex: Male
- Known for: Portraying Lord Tubbington on Glee
- Owner: CeCe Card
- Residence: Newport Beach, California

Lord Tubbington, also known as Aragon, was a Bengal cat best known for portraying the character of the same name on the Fox television series Glee and for local public appearances with his owner in Southern California. He lived with handler CeCe Card in Newport Beach, California.

== Early life ==
Aragon was adopted by CeCe Card in 2005 from a rescue organization on the East Coast of the United States. Originally named Aragorn due to his size, he was relocated to Laguna Beach, California and subsequently to Newport Beach. Card managed the animal's socialization and leash training to acclimatize him to public environments and noise.

== Career ==
Aragon was recruited by a talent scout from the animal agency Paws For Effect while walking in Laguna Beach. This led to his casting as the character Lord Tubbington on Glee. In addition to his recurring role on the series, Aragon appeared in a Verizon iPad commercial and a video production for the web series Ghost Ghirls. He also appeared as a celebrity animal guest at the Animal Health Institute's annual Pet Night on Capitol Hill.

== Personal life ==
Aragon's owner was Card, and his family members included Krista and his cat sister named Lady Beatrice. His death occurred on December 12, 2018, at the age of 14.
