= List of Green Acres episodes =

Green Acres is an American sitcom starring Eddie Albert and Eva Gabor as a couple who move from New York City to a rural country farm. The series was first broadcast on CBS from September 15, 1965 to April 27, 1971. All the episodes were filmed in color.

== Series overview ==
Season	Episodes	Originally released	
Season	Episodes	First released	Last released
1	32	September 15, 1965	June 1, 1966
2	30	September 14, 1966	April 26, 1967
3	30	September 6, 1967	April 10, 1968
4	26	September 25, 1968	April 2, 1969
5	26	September 27, 1969	April 11, 1970
6	26	September 15, 1970	April 27, 1971

== Episodes ==
=== Season 1 (1965–66) ===
No. overall	No. in season	Title	Directed by	Written by	Original release date	Prod. code
1	1	"Oliver Buys a Farm"	Ralph Levy	Jay Sommers	September 15, 1965	1
Oliver Wendell Douglas, a big New York lawyer, hates the "rat race" of the city. He would like to move away and buy a farm. His beautiful wife Lisa does not exactly love the idea. Even as a child, Oliver wanted to be a farmer, but his father forced him to be a lawyer. While a pilot in the Air Force, Oliver always looked at what was growing in the farms he flew over. After the Air Force, Oliver met and married Lisa. Lisa suggests that Oliver start growing vegetables on the patio of his penthouse to see if he really enjoys it. Oliver tells Lisa he is going on a business trip, but actually flies to Hooterville. While there, he buys the old Haney farm. Oliver meets Uncle Joe Carson, Sam Drucker, Floyd Smoot and Fred Ziffel. Oliver needs Sam to notarize the deed to the Haney farm. The men are surprised that Oliver bought that farm. Lisa is quite upset when she hears what Oliver did. Mother Eunice Douglas (Eleanor Audley) wants Lisa to move in with her instead of living on a farm. Lisa reluctantly agrees to move and stay at least six months. She is stunned when she sees where she will now be living. Willis Bouchey as Mr. Felton. John Charles Daly as Himself. Guest Stars from Petticoat Junction: Edgar Buchanan as Uncle Joe Carson, Rufe Davis as Floyd Smoot, Frank Cady as Sam Drucker, Hank Patterson as Fred Ziffel. John Charles Daly (of What's My Line?) tells this story.
2	2	"Lisa's First Day on the Farm"	Ralph Levy	Jay Sommers & Dick Chevillat	September 22, 1965	2
Back in New York, Mr. Peters is trying to sublet the Douglas apartment to Horace Bennett (Lyle Talbot) and his wife (Iris Adrian). Lisa gets her first look at their run down farmhouse and wants to go back to New York. Mr. Haney (Pat Buttram), who previously owned the farm, introduces Lisa and Oliver to Eb Dawson (Tom Lester), one of Haney's workers. Eb asks Oliver if he needs a hired hand to help with the farm, but Oliver says no. When they get inside they see that Haney took everything with him, including the bathroom fixtures. Oliver keeps saying he can fix all the problems they find with the house. Lisa points out that there is no electricity or phones. Oliver crashes through the kitchen floor into the cellar. Meanwhile, Uncle Joe runs a pool to see how long the Douglas' will stay. Oliver brings Lisa to Drucker's store to meet Sam, Charley and Floyd. Oliver finds out about the pool and that it will take 8 months to get electricity. Oliver buys back the fixtures from Haney. Despite Oliver still not wanting to hire Eb, he helps Oliver with things around the house. Eb is eventually hired. Lisa wants to return to New York immediately and starts packing. But after a talk with Kate Bradley, she decides to give farm life a try. Guest Stars from Petticoat Junction: Bea Benaderet as Kate Bradley, Edgar Buchanan as Uncle Joe Carson, Smiley Burnette as Charley Pratt, Rufe Davis as Floyd Smoot, Frank Cady as Sam Drucker
3	3	"The Decorator"	Richard L. Bare	Jay Sommers & Dick Chevillat	September 29, 1965	3
Lisa still cannot believe she is in Hooterville. Oliver is trying to talk Lisa into cooking. Meanwhile, Mother Douglas is having a hard time getting a flight to Hooterville. She plans to go there and save Lisa. Haney comes by and Oliver winds up renting a table and chairs from him. Lisa chases what she thinks is a chicken to get some eggs. Kate Bradley comes by and tells her it is a rooster. Kate tries to help Lisa in the kitchen when she learns that Lisa does not know the first thing about cooking. Lisa's attempt at pancakes does not go well. Lisa threatens to leave unless Oliver starts to decorate the house. Sam sets Oliver up with Roland Wilson, a decorator from Pixley. Mother Douglas is riding the Cannonball and cannot believe how bumpy the ride is. Oliver comes back home with the "honeymoon special" that he bought from Sam. It has assorted can goods and other things. Mother Douglas arrives and she faints when she sees what Lisa has to live in. Roland comes by and it turns out he is a cake decorator. Guest Stars from Petticoat Junction: Bea Benaderet as Kate Bradley, Lori Saunders as Bobbie Jo Bradley, Rufe Davis as Floyd Smoot, Frank Cady as Sam Drucker
4	4	"The Best Laid Plans"	Richard L. Bare	Jay Sommers & Dick Chevillat	October 6, 1965	4
Lisa is going to New York for one week to pack up their furniture. Oliver is eager to start farming. The manual Oliver is reading says one should see what farmers around you are planting. Oliver goes to talk to Ben Miller (Guy Wilkerson). Ben says he has heard that Lisa left Oliver. Oliver tries to explain Lisa went to get their furniture. Ben gives Oliver some advice on what to plant and the equipment he will need. Later, Oliver drives the tractor out of the barn and it falls apart. Haney comes by and says he is sorry to hear that Lisa left. He tries to sell Oliver a cow. In New York, Mother Eunice Douglas still cannot believe Lisa is going to live in Hooterville. Eunice says she should've stopped Lisa from marrying her son. Haney tries again to sell Oliver the cow. Lisa and Eunice go to see Roland Weatherby (Gavin Gordon), a decorator, for suggestions on how to fix the Douglas home. Oliver and Eb draw out a map of the farm and where they will plant things. Lisa comes home after three days and says the furniture will arrive next week. She also has some very elaborate plans for remodeling. Eb shows Oliver the newspaper that says a country club will be built in Hooterville. It will be built on Oliver's land. Lisa buys Eleanore the cow from Haney.
5	5	"My Husband, the Rooster Renter"	Richard L. Bare	Jay Sommers & Dick Chevillat	October 13, 1965	5
Mr. Haney rents Bertram the rooster to Oliver to wake him up in the morning. Oliver is making some repairs to his roof. Hank Kimball (Alvy Moore), the county farm agent, comes by. Oliver falls through the roof into the kitchen. Hank gives Oliver the names of a good roofing man and plumber. Hank laughs when he hears that Oliver bought Eleanore the cow from Haney. Hank takes some soil samples for analysis. Hank also has a hard time telling Oliver what he really thinks of the farm. Oliver and Lisa go to Sam's store to call the repairmen. The next morning, Bertram does not crow. Ed Ferguson (Sid Melton), the plumber, shows up and is working under the house. Jack Parker (John Harmon), the roofer, then arrives. Haney tries to rent Alice the chicken to Oliver. Carl Flint (Phil Gordon) comes by to install the phone. Ed says the plumbing is all fixed, but there is no electricity to run the pump. The phone gets installed, but there is no phone line. Haney just happens to have a generator to rent. Guest Star from Petticoat Junction: Frank Cady as Sam Drucker
6	6	"Furniture, Furniture, Who's Got the Furniture?"	Richard L. Bare	Jay Sommers & Dick Chevillat	October 20, 1965	6
Oliver is trying to pull a tree stump out from in front of the house with his tractor. He wants to extend the house in that spot. Oliver winds up ruining the tractor. Haney comes by. Oliver tells Haney that he sold him a defective tractor. Haney tries to sell Oliver some wallpaper. Lisa does not like any of Haney's samples. Oliver's mother Eunice arrives in Hooterville on the Cannonball. Oliver and Lisa go to Sam's store. Oliver asks Sam about getting some parts for his tractor. Sam gives Oliver a letter from Eunice stating that she is shipping their furniture from New York. At the train station, Eunice accidentally calls Haney instead of Oliver. Because of a mix-up, Oliver's furniture is delivered to Haney. Trying to get to Oliver's house, Eunice is stuck with Uncle Joe on his handcar. Haney tries to sell Oliver and Lisa their own furniture, but winds up just charging them to deliver it. Learning that Eunice was in Hooterville, Eb and Lisa go looking for her at the train station, but do not find her. An excited Oliver shows Lisa the furniture in the house, but things are a little cramped and cluttered. Newt Kiley's bull chases Eunice up a tree. Peter Leeds as Moving Man. Guest Stars from Petticoat Junction: Edgar Buchanan as Uncle Joe Carson, Smiley Burnette as Charley Pratt, Rufe Davis as Floyd Smoot, Frank Cady as Sam Drucker
7	7	"Neighborliness"	Richard L. Bare	Jay Sommers & Dick Chevillat	October 27, 1965	7
Eunice is still visiting. Oliver is repairing the porch rail and it is disturbing Eunice's sleep. Lisa is preparing breakfast and it is not going well. Eunice wants Lisa to return to New York. Hank comes by and tells Oliver that the report on his soil samples has not come in yet. Hank tells Oliver that he needs to plow up his fields soon or miss planting season. Eunice begs Oliver to give up farming. Haney comes by and just happens to have a plow for sale. Oliver says he will get a plow from Sam. When Haney says it will take Sam three weeks to get a plow, Oliver buys Haney's. The plow breaks and then so does the tractor. Uncle Joe is trying to buy a rifle from Sam, but is dickering over the price. Oliver comes by. Sam cannot get Oliver a new plow in time. Joe has a solution to the problem. He charges farmers one dollar each to enter a plowing contest at the Douglas farm. Joe also promises them free lunch and big prizes which Oliver will provide. When Oliver learns about the contest, he tells the farmers that Joe mislead them. The neighbors still plow his fields and an excited Oliver promises them lunch. Lisa does not know how she will feed all those people. Lisa finds a way to get a couple of the farmers wives to cook the lunch. Barbara Pepper as Doris Ziffel. Guest Stars from Petticoat Junction: Edgar Buchanan as Uncle Joe Carson, Frank Cady as Sam Drucker, Hank Patterson as Fred Ziffel, Kay E. Kuter as Newt Kiley, Tom Fadden as Ben Miller
8	8	"Lisa the Helpmate"	Richard L. Bare	S : Al Schwartz and Lou Huston; T : Jay Sommers & Dick Chevillat	November 3, 1965	8
Oliver has not received his soil sample analysis yet, so he starts planting anyway. Mother Eunice Douglas still is trying to get Lisa to leave Hooterville. Oliver suggests that Eunice get married again, then she would have someone else's life to run. Meanwhile, Kate wants to know who Uncle Joe is getting dressed up for. Kate finds out Joe is going to call on Eunice. Oliver learns from Hank that his first batch was destroyed in shipping, so he will race over some new soil samples. Joe calls on Eunice and invites her to a poker game at the Elks lodge and then bowling. Eunice is not thrilled with Joe's plans and asks him to leave. Seeing an opportunity to get Oliver to give up farming, Eunice spikes the new soil samples with items from her cosmetics bag. At the State Agricultural College, Oliver asks a student (Jack Bannon) where the soil labs are. Oliver talks to Mr. Webster (Parley Baer), who says he will process Oliver's samples right away. After learning that his soil was contaminated, Oliver decides to move back to New York. Oliver has Sam put an ad in the paper for the farm. Oliver figures out that his mother was to blame for the soil after Hank tells him what was in it. Lisa has a scheme to make Oliver want to continue farming. He sees through the scheme, but appreciates what Lisa did. To punish Eunice, Oliver makes her go out several times with Joe. Guest Stars from Petticoat Junction: Bea Benaderet as Kate Bradley, Edgar Buchanan as Uncle Joe Carson, Frank Cady as Sam Drucker
9	9	"You Can't Plug in a 2 with a 6"	Richard L. Bare	Jay Sommers & Dick Chevillat	November 10, 1965	9
Oliver is listening to the radio waiting for the price of wheat to be announced. Lisa plugs the coffee pot in and the generator goes out. Oliver has assigned every electrical device a number from one to seven in an effort to keep their rickety generator from blowing. Lisa has a hard time grasping the concept. At Sam's store, Fred Ziffel and Ben Miller are trying to decide what they are going to plant. Fred says that when his wife's lumbago acts up, it is a sure sign to plant corn. Ben says that when his wife Emily gets cranky, it is time to plant soy beans. Oliver comes by and wants to order wheat seeds. Oliver says he is relying on statistics provided by the Department of Agriculture. Oliver gets his seed and Hank thinks it was a mistake. After hearing from Hank that the price of wheat had dropped, Oliver decides to plant corn. Lisa visits Doris Ziffel. Doris tells her she made it up that she had lumbago because she did not want to slop the pigs. Lisa meets Arnold the Pig. Lisa tells Oliver that Doris does not have lumbago. What follows is much confusion over what to plant, when everyone keeps changing their minds. Guest Stars from Petticoat Junction: Edgar Buchanan as Uncle Joe Carson, Frank Cady as Sam Drucker, Hank Patterson as Fred Ziffel, Tom Fadden as Ben Miller
10	10	"Don't Call Us, We'll Call You"	Richard L. Bare	Jay Sommers & Dick Chevillat	November 17, 1965	10
In New York, Judson Carter Felton (Roland Winters) thinks that Oliver can win a legal case for him. He tries to call Hooterville and talk to Oliver, but has too many problems when he gets Sam and others on the line. Oliver decides to put down some lime to adjust the pH of his soil. Haney comes by and charges Oliver for a phone message he is delivering. Haney says that Felton would like Oliver to call him. Oliver does call Felton, but then there is a problem with the party line when Doris Ziffel gets on. Judson decides to travel to Hooterville instead. Meanwhile, Oliver asks Hank if he has any pull with the Hooterville Phone Company. The next morning, Oliver wakes up to a telephone pole outside his bedroom window. Ed Ferguson (Jerry Hausner), who installed the pole, tells Oliver it is a gift from Sarah, the owner of the phone company. Her son is Hank and she was glad to talk to him again after a fight they had. Oliver learns that there is a phone at the top of the pole. Ed says it will be months before they can hook up the phone inside the house. Judson arrives and tries to talk Oliver into coming to New York to help with the case. Oliver will not leave but will discuss the case with Judson. Lisa makes Judson some breakfast and tries to explain the electrical system. Judson receives a call and has to climb the pole to answer it. Judson cannot believe the way Oliver lives now. Guest Stars from Petticoat Junction: Edgar Buchanan as Uncle Joe Carson, Rufe Davis as Floyd Smoot, Frank Cady as Sam Drucker
11	11	"Parity Begins at Home"	Richard L. Bare	Jay Sommers & Dick Chevillat	November 24, 1965	11
Newt Kiley and Ben Miller are talking to George Wilkins (Jesse White) and Wally Jenkins (Sam Edwards) from the Conservation and Stabilization Committee in Crabwell Corners. Newt and Ben would like to increase their acreage for growing wheat. George and Wally learn that Oliver bought the Haney farm. Meanwhile, Oliver wants to plant his entire 160 acres (0.65 km^{2}) with wheat. Lisa washes whole pillows and they break apart filling the washing machine with feathers. George and Wally come to the Douglas house. They inform Oliver that he can only plant 8 acres of wheat. If he plants more than that, there will be a penalty. Oliver says it is his land and he will plant what he wants. Oliver holds a Wheat Penalty Protest Meeting at Drucker's store. He gets all the farmers to sign a petition. The next day Hank comes by and suggests that he does not send the petition. Oliver says he has already mailed it to Washington D.C. Mr. Bennington (Howard Wendell), at the Agriculture Dept., gets Oliver's letter. Washington informs George and Wally that the wheat penalties were abolished in 1963. They tell Oliver the good news. Guest Stars from Petticoat Junction: Frank Cady as Sam Drucker, Tom Fadden as Ben Miller, Kay E. Kuter as Newt Kiley, Walter Baldwin as Grandpappy Miller Note: In the show the names are George Wilkins and Wally Jenkins. However, in the credits their last names are switched, and listed as "George Jenkins" and "Wally Wilkins".
12	12	"Lisa Has a Calf"	Richard L. Bare	T : Jay Sommers & Dick Chevillat; S/T : Phil Leslie	December 8, 1965	12
It is storming outside and Oliver has all types of containers around to catch the rain leaking through the roof. Eb comes by and tells Oliver that Eleanor, the cow Oliver bought from Haney, is pregnant. The next morning Oliver finds Eleanor in the kitchen. Lisa brought her in so she would not get wet. Eb is afraid that if Haney finds out about Eleanor, he will claim that the calf belongs to him. Haney comes by and Oliver tries to keep him occupied while Eb hides Eleanor. Lisa, not knowing Oliver is keeping it a secret, lets slip about a pregnancy, but not who. Haney thinks it is Lisa that is due, and this rumor spreads through Hooterville. Eunice Douglas calls Drucker's store and Uncle Joe tells her that Lisa is expecting. Hank comes by and Oliver tells him about Eleanor. Kate Bradley drops by to see how Lisa is doing and leaves quite confused. Eb tells Oliver that he thinks it is time. Mother Douglas arrives and has brought Dr. Fillmore (Stanley Farrar) from New York with her. Eunice gets upset when Oliver tells her that Lisa is in the barn. With Dr. Fillmore's help, Eleanor has her calf. Lisa tells Eunice that they will name the calf after her. Guest Stars from Petticoat Junction: Bea Benaderet as Kate Bradley, Edgar Buchanan as Uncle Joe Carson, Frank Cady as Sam Drucker
13	13	"The Wedding Anniversary"	Richard L. Bare	Jay Sommers & Dick Chevillat	December 15, 1965	13
It is the Douglas' wedding anniversary. Oliver remembers the date but cannot recall the exact number of years he and Lisa have been married. Lisa shows Eb a picture of her and Oliver in jail. Lisa flashes back to last year's anniversary. Even then Oliver could not remember how many years they were married. The trouble started when Oliver found corn borers in his terrace garden and he starts to panic. He calls the Department of Agriculture and speaks to George Bennington (Dave Willock). That conversation gets no results. Oliver then calls Dr. Faber (Vinton Hayworth), who is not in. Dr. Faber shows up and gets upset when he finds out Oliver called about his corn. Oliver refuses to go to the anniversary party at the Waldorf that his mother has set up. Mother Douglas comes by and when she learns that Oliver will not leave, she starts tossing his "crop" off the balcony. Because of the pots crashing onto the street below, the police come by and arrest Oliver and Lisa. Back in Hooterville, Haney comes by to give Oliver a rubber plant as an anniversary gift. He then proceeds to sell Oliver a pot to put it in. Oliver and Lisa decide to celebrate at the Shady Rest Hotel that night. But Eb tells Oliver that his wheat crop is threatened by sawflies. His angry call to the Agriculture Department lands him and Lisa in jail again. Something the Sheriff says makes Oliver realize he has been married 10 years. Guest Stars from Petticoat Junction: Bea Benaderet as Kate Bradley, Edgar Buchanan as Uncle Joe Carson
14	14	"What Happened in Scranton?"	Richard L. Bare	Jay Sommers & Dick Chevillat	December 22, 1965	14
Oliver is stunned when Lisa can ask Alice the hen for a certain number of eggs and Alice does it. Eb teaches Oliver how to milk Eleanor the cow. Hank comes by and has a confusing conversation with Oliver about how to fertilize his crop. Lisa decides to bring a little culture and charm to Hooterville by means of a beauty parlor. The local ladies like Lisa's idea. She calls Oliver's mother and asks her to send a hairdresser. Eunice says she will get Claude (James Millhollin) of the Ritz Plaza to come. Eunice blackmails him with one word: Scranton. Claude arrives at Oliver's farm. He has a little disagreement with Haney about the price for the ride there. Claude at first thought he was only there to do Lisa's hair. He sets up shop on the Cannonball and gives the Hooterville women new hairdos. Charlie asks Floyd how he got talked into letting Claude set up shop on the train. Now, the women refuse to do any farm work because they are too "beautiful". This has all the farmers in the valley come to Lisa and Oliver to complain. Lisa gets them to appreciate their wives. Elvia Allman as Cora Watson. Guy Wilkerson as Lud Watson. Dan White as Man. Minta Durfee as Hooterville Woman. Guest Stars from Petticoat Junction: Smiley Burnette as Charley Pratt, Rufe Davis as Floyd Smoot, Frank Cady as Sam Drucker
15	15	"How to Enlarge a Bedroom"	Richard L. Bare	Jay Sommers & Dick Chevillat	December 29, 1965	15
After persistent pleas and an ultimatum from Lisa, Oliver agrees to have the bedroom enlarged. Oliver climbs the pole to make a phone call, but Eb is calling his girlfriend. Eb asks if he can borrow the car for his date, but Oliver says no. Oliver calls contractors Alf (Sid Melton) and Ralph Monroe (Mary Grace Canfield). Haney comes by and tells Oliver that he is sad that Oliver will be renovating the house. Haney mentions that unless he does the work, his cousin Buford Wilkins (Pat Buttram), the building inspector, might not approve the job. Oliver and Lisa meet Alf and Ralph and learn that Ralph is a girl. Oliver goes to the Ziffel house to see the work the Monroe brothers did there. Alf and Ralph rip the bedroom apart and begin moving the walls. Oliver goes to get a building permit from Sam. Alf tells Oliver that only the phone company can move his telephone pole. Buford comes by to inspect the work so far. Buford happens to be the father of Eb's girlfriend Ophelia. When Oliver refuses to give Eb the keys to the car so he can take out Ophelia, Buford disapproves the project and condemns the whole house. Oliver gives Eb the keys and Buford approves the permit. Buford learns that the project is for a bedroom. It gets disapproved again because Alf and Ralph are only licensed for hen houses and chicken coops. Oliver is left with an open-air bedroom without a roof and the pole with his phone is gone. Norman Leavitt as Telephone Man. Guest Star from Petticoat Junction: Frank Cady as Sam Drucker
16	16	"Give Me Land, Lots of Land"	Richard L. Bare	Jay Sommers & Dick Chevillat	January 5, 1966	16
Alf and Ralph still have not finished the walls for the bedroom. Lud Watson is putting his farm up for sale. Now that he is collecting Social Security, he and his wife Cora would like to travel a little. Lud tries to talk Oliver into buying the 140 acres (0.57 km^{2}) as it is adjoining his property. It would however not include the farmhouse on it. Oliver wants to talk to Lisa about it. Hank comes by and Oliver asks him about the Watson farm. Oliver does not get a straight answer. Lisa is against the idea until she sees the Watson farmhouse and thinks that is their new home. Oliver leaves for New York to arrange the financing. Haney comes by and Lisa tells him they are moving to the Watson's home. He tries to sell her his moving services. In New York, Oliver goes to see his mother. He tries to tell Eunice that Lisa agreed to buy the Watson farm. Thinking it is part of the deal, Lisa sells the Watson's furniture to Mr. Haney. She then has her furniture brought over. Oliver comes back to an empty house. He learns from Eb that Lisa moved everything to the Watson house. Oliver explains to Lisa that they do not own the Watson house. They now need to buy back the Watson's furniture from Haney.
17	17	"I Didn't Raise My Husband to Be a Fireman"	Richard L. Bare	Jay Sommers & Dick Chevillat	January 19, 1966	17
The Monroe brothers come by the Douglas house early in the morning to continue with the remodeling. Lisa and Oliver are still sleeping. Lisa's attempt at making oatmeal is a failure. Lisa and Oliver see a flare shoot up into the sky. Haney comes by and says there is a fire at Newt Kiley's. Oliver learns about the Hooterville Volunteer Fire Department. Lisa thinks Oliver should ask to join, but he thinks they should ask him. At Sam's store, Lisa mentions the fire department. Chief Joe Carson says the only requirement to join is that one must play a musical instrument in their marching band. The reason is that they have more parades than fires. Oliver says he can play some guitar. Joe tells him when the next rehearsal at the Shady Rest is. During rehearsal, Kate tries to show Lisa how to soft boil an egg. Oliver is accepted, given a helmet and put on sky watch duty. The next morning, Oliver has a stiff neck from watching the sky. Hank comes by and tells Oliver about his time on sky watch duty. When he sees a signal that night, Oliver races off to what he thinks is a fire. It turns to be a emergency band rehearsal. Joe takes away Oliver's helmet when he arrives without his guitar. Guest Stars from Petticoat Junction: Bea Benaderet as Kate Bradley, Edgar Buchanan as Uncle Joe Carson, Frank Cady as Sam Drucker
18	18	"Lisa Bakes a Cake"	Richard L. Bare	Jay Sommers & Dick Chevillat	January 26, 1966	18
Sam just finished printing the new Hooterville phone book. Oliver is annoyed when Lisa puts a listing in the phone book: "Oliver Douglas, Attorney at Law". He is afraid he will be flooded with calls wanting his legal advice and he will not have time for farming. Meanwhile, Lisa is trying to bake a cake. Ralph and Alf want to know if Oliver wants a law office added to the bedroom. Eb tells Oliver he is glad that he is giving up farming to do something he knows how to do. Oliver wants his money back from Haney for the broken down tractor he bought from him. Haney tries to sell him a lawyer desk. Hank comes by the house and tells Oliver that it was a smart move to give up farming to practice law. Hank also mentions how many phone calls he gets. The phone rings and it turns out to be for Hank. After awhile, Oliver becomes depressed when nobody calls for his legal services. Oliver is excited when he finally gets a call from potential customer Harry Bleedwell (Hal Smith). Turns out Harry only wants Oliver to put an ad in the Pixley pageant bulletin that he is a lawyer. Harry threatens to sue when he trips over Lisa's 20-pound pound cake. Harry then gets hit in the head by a board that Ralph was carrying. Haney runs his truck into Harry's car. Harry says he is suing them all. Oliver finds various items in Lisa's cake.: The episode is out of order. Since Oliver was not a license to practice in state in Hooverville and from the episode of what’s in a name that mixed up the episode. Since Oliver took the state bar exam and passes and is now a full fledge lawyer in this state.; Guest Stars from Petticoat Junction: Smiley Burnette as Charley Pratt, Rufe Davis as Floyd Smoot, Frank Cady as Sam Drucker
19	19	"Sprained Ankle, Country Style"	Richard L. Bare	Jay Sommers & Dick Chevillat	February 2, 1966	19
Oliver and Lisa are sleeping in the barn until their bedroom is done. Eb tries to milk Eleanor the cow without waking them up, but it does not work. Alf and Ralph claim to have finished the bedroom. Oliver is excited. Before the unveiling, Ralph plays the bugle and Alf wants to give a speech. Oliver is not at all happy with the results and he is not going to pay them. Later, Oliver falls through the roof and sprains his ankle while putting up a TV antenna. Dr. Barton Stuart (Regis Toomey) says Oliver should stay off he feet for a few days. While Lisa tries to take care of him, Alf and Ralph come by. He tells them to fix the closet door and let him get some rest. Hank comes by and accidentally touches Oliver's injured foot. Curly Robins (Donald Curtis), the TV announcer, runs the movie "Frankenstein Meets Mary Poppins". Several other people from Hooterville stop by and unintentionally annoy Oliver. Oliver is very hungry. They all come with food, but eat it themselves as they crowd Oliver off his bed to watch the movie. Oliver winds up out in the barn. Guest Star from Petticoat Junction: Lori Saunders as Bobbie Jo Bradley
20	20	"The Price of Apples"	Richard L. Bare	Jay Sommers & Dick Chevillat	February 9, 1966	20
Oliver is excited because his apple crop is ready to be harvested. Hank comes by and Oliver asks him what the procedure is to market them. Hank tells Oliver that he will make more on his apple crop if he gets them to market first. Oliver tells Eb to try and get some kids from the high school to help pick the apples. Oliver learns from Sam and Newt that the Crabwell Corners famers reserved all the delivery trucks. Oliver agrees to buy Newt and Fred's apples for $1.75 a bushel. He believes he can get $4.00 a bushel if he can get to the Capitol's market first. Haney tries to sell Oliver his trucking service, but Oliver is not interested. Some high school kids come by to pick the fruit and Oliver uses their old truck to transport the apples. On the way to the capitol, the truck gets a flat tire. Oliver has to unload all the apples to get to the spare tire. Oliver hears over the radio that the price of apples is starting to drop. Later, a Police Officer (Jack Bannon) stops Oliver. It seems that Oliver left all the apples back where he had the flat tire. The price of apples continues to drop. When the truck needs a head gasket, Lisa's "hotcakes" come to the rescue. Oliver learns that apples are now going for $1.75. Vince Barnett as Gus. Note: The police officer who pulls Oliver over is Hank Kimball's cousin. He rambles just like Hank, and his voice has been dubbed by Alvy Moore. Guest Star from Petticoat Junction: Frank Cady as Sam Drucker
21	21	"What's in a Name?"	Richard L. Bare	Jay Sommers & Dick Chevillat	February 16, 1966	21
Alf wakes up Oliver and Lisa when he nails up a sign outside advertising bedroom remodeling. Ralph is apparently enamored with Hank Kimball, the county agent. She wants to know if he will be stopping by today. Ralph tells Lisa she wants to marry Hank. When Alf takes the sign down, he rips a hole in the wall. Hank comes by to talk to Oliver about irrigating his corn. Ralph cannot get Hank to notice her. Hank is talking to Oliver about the different methods of irrigation. Lisa and Ralph keep interrupting them. Hank tells Lisa he could not go out with a woman with a man's name. Lisa suggests to Ralph that she change her name. Lisa asks Oliver to file court papers to have Ralph's name changed to Sophia. Judge Murdock (Howard Smith) tells Oliver that he is not licensed to practice law in this state. Oliver speaks to Carl Hinkley (Richard Hale) of the State Bar Association in Pixley. Hinkley has never heard of Harvard University, where Oliver graduated. Oliver has a week to study for the exam at the State Capitol. Oliver goes to Sam's store to send a telegram. He wants to get a resume from his old law firm. Oliver studies for the week and winds up passing. Ralph says she given up on Hank and is not changing her name. She also is dating a guy named Evelyn Bets.: The episode is out of order. Since Oliver was not licensed to practice in state in Hooverville and from the episode of what’s in a name that mixed up the episode. Since Oliver took the state bar exam and passes and is now a full fledged lawyer in this state.; Guest Stars from Petticoat Junction: Edgar Buchanan as Uncle Joe Carson, Frank Cady as Sam Drucker
22	22	"The Day of Decision"	Richard L. Bare	Jay Sommers & Dick Chevillat	February 23, 1966	22
Lisa agreed to try out the farm for six months. Today is the day she must decide whether her and Oliver will remain on the farm or go back to New York. Oliver flashes back to the first days on the farm and the reactions from Lisa, his Mother Eunice and Mignon the dog. Eb asks Oliver if Lisa has made a decision yet. Oliver recalls him talking Lisa into going. Alf and Ralph argue over what Lisa will decide. Lisa flashes back to when she first saw the kitchen and realizes there is no phone or electricity. Lisa remembers all the times Oliver fell through the roof and the floors. At Drucker's store, Sam and Uncle Joe disagree over what Lisa will decide. Joe recalls when Oliver said he bought the Haney farm and Joe tried to sell Oliver some lousy land. Oliver remembers the lousy products Haney sold him. Lisa decides she wants to go back to the city and Oliver angrily prepares to leave. People come by to say goodbye. Lisa agrees to stay another 6 months after she learns what happens to the animals after they are gone. Oliver gets to keep his farm. Guest Stars from Petticoat Junction: Edgar Buchanan as Uncle Joe Carson, Smiley Burnette as Charley Pratt (archive footage), Rufe Davis as Floyd Smoot (archive footage), Frank Cady as Sam Drucker
23	23	"A Pig in a Poke"	Richard L. Bare	Jay Sommers & Dick Chevillat	March 9, 1966	23
Oliver and Lisa are in New York where Oliver is the guest speaker at a Harvard alumni banquet. Oliver mentions that he gave up law to be a farmer. But just recently he had to start practicing law again. Oliver points out Arnold the Pig, who is seated next to him. Oliver says he will explain why Arnold is here. Oliver flashes back to when he first got the call to be guest speaker. Lisa is trying to decide what dress to wear. Meanwhile, Sheriff Blake (Emory Parnell) tells Fred he has an order to take Arnold in lieu of a debt that Fred owes Haney. The Ziffels seek Oliver's legal advice. Fred says he wants to shoot Haney, but Doris will not let him. Oliver goes to speak to Haney, but gets nowhere. The Sheriff comes back to get Arnold and Oliver tells Fred to turn the pig over. Arnold is not there. Arnold is hiding in the Douglas house and Oliver gets stuck under the floor board looking for him. Hank comes by and Lisa asks him to help Oliver. Eb tries to help Hank pull Oliver out, but they only pull his pants out. The fire department is called to get him loose. When Oliver and Lisa finally get to New York, they discover Arnold was a stowaway in a large piece of luggage. Oliver says that is how Arnold wound up at the banquet. Arnold meets a girl pig in the bar.
24	24	"The Deputy"	Richard L. Bare	Jay Sommers & Dick Chevillat	March 16, 1966	25
Sam Drucker's going on a two-week vacation to visit his sister. He is having a hard time finding someone to take over his duties as deputy sheriff. Uncle Joe keeps volunteering, but Sam does not want him. Sam railroads Oliver into filling in. Oliver tries to give Haney a ticket for not having a license plate. Haney tries to sell Oliver a stuffed alligator. Just then an officer pulls up on a motorcycle. Oliver winds up getting a ticket from Haney's police officer nephew, Heston Haney (Joe Conley), for having out of state plates. Back at home, Oliver shows Lisa his Deputy Badge. A problem arises when Oliver shows Lisa how to use a pair of handcuffs before discovering that he has lost the keys. They look around for the keys. Oliver decides to go back to where he got the ticket from Heston. Things get awkward when he and Lisa try to get in the car. They run into Heston and Oliver tells him he lost the key. They then go back to Sam's store, but he has already gone. Hank comes by and they ask him for his help. Hank has them put the chain of the handcuffs on the railroad track. They are almost run over by the Cannonball. The two try to climb the pole to call the Sheriff, but that does not work. Oliver sends Eb to the Sheriff to see if he has the keys, but he does not. Eb suggests a hair pin. While Oliver is saying that is a stupid idea, Lisa frees herself. Lisa then attaches the open handcuff to the table leg. Guest Stars from Petticoat Junction: Edgar Buchanan as Uncle Joe Carson, Frank Cady as Sam Drucker
25	25	"Double Drick"	Richard L. Bare	Jay Sommers & Dick Chevillat	March 23, 1966	26
It takes some doing, but Oliver gets his generator running. He then reminds Lisa that she can only plug in a certain amount of things at one time. The generator breaks down again and Oliver decides to check on the status of his electricity request. It has been seven months since he applied, so he asks Sam what the hold up is. It turns out that Sam forgot to mail in his application. Oliver decides to deal with the power company in person. He has a hard time dealing with the clerk, Mr. Powers (Jonathan Hole). Larry Lawlor (Dave Willock) comes by to install the electrical meter. He has a confusing conversation with Lisa. Oliver points out to Larry that the meter is running even though the lines have not been put in yet. Larry says it must be defective, but there is nothing he can do. Oliver calls the power company to have it replaced and speaks with Mr. Powers again. Hank comes by and has a confusing conversation with Lisa. Meanwhile, Oliver winds up having to buy various electrical appliances from Haney because a power line pole has to go on Haney's land. Nothing seems to go right as now Oliver has a power pole by the bedroom window. Plus the lines cannot be connected to the house because there is no meter. Oliver learns from Mr. Powers that they have to wait six months for another meter. But Mr. Powers says he will see what he can do. Things do not go well. Guest Star from Petticoat Junction: Frank Cady as Sam Drucker
26	26	"The Ballad of Molly Turgiss"	Richard L. Bare	Jay Sommers & Dick Chevillat	April 6, 1966	24
Oliver overhears Eb signing a folk song and tells him that he collected and wrote folk songs while he was in college. Eb says that Oliver should write a song about a hundred year old local legend, Molly Turgiss (Renie Riano). The mere mention of her name causes bad things to happen. Lisa tells Oliver that the Ziffels are invited over for dinner. Lisa and Oliver go to Drucker's store to pick up things for dinner. When Oliver mentions Molly Turgiss, the pickle barrel bursts open. Meanwhile, Fred does not want to go to dinner because he is worried Oliver will ask about Molly. Fred does wind up going. Oliver sings some folk songs. When Oliver does bring Molly up, the Ziffels leave. Oliver starts to write a song about Molly and he sees her vision in a mirror. Haney comes by and asks Oliver if he is selling the farm, because Oliver's been mentioning "you know who". When Oliver says Molly's name, Haney's truck drives away. Hank Kimball tells Oliver and Lisa about Molly and how ugly she was. People would always avoid her. She left town but said she would come back one day and haunt anyone that mentioned her name. Lisa feels sorry for Molly and talks to her in the mirror. Lisa offers to give her a make-over if she promises to not do bad things anymore. Oliver sings The Ballad of Molly Turgiss for the Ziffels, Hank and Haney. With Lisa's permission, Molly breaks Oliver's guitar over his head. Guest Star from Petticoat Junction: Frank Cady as Sam Drucker
27	27	"Never Look a Gift Tractor in the Mouth"	Richard L. Bare	Jay Sommers & Dick Chevillat	April 27, 1966	28
It is a few days before Oliver's birthday. Oliver is trying to read a book and Lisa keeps asking him questions about the birthday and what he would like. Eb and Oliver are having no luck starting the tractor and Lisa sees this. Lisa goes to buy a tractor and has a confusing conversation with Mr. Johnson (Stuart Erwin), the salesman. Lisa buys the biggest and fanciest tractor she can find. So that Oliver will not see it yet, she has it delivered to the Ziffels' farm with a sign that says "Happy Birthday from a friend". Fred does not know who it is from, but drives it over to Oliver to show it off. Oliver thinks Fred bought it because Fred does not mention that it was a gift. Oliver tells Lisa that Fred got a new tractor and he is showing it to everyone in the valley. Lisa goes to the Ziffel house to try and explain about the tractor. They are so thankful for it that it becomes impossible for Lisa to straighten things out and get the new tractor back. Later, Doris starts to wonder why Lisa would give Fred a tractor. Doris confronts Oliver and suggests that there is something going on between Lisa and Fred. Oliver figures out what happened and confirms the misunderstanding with Lisa. He then goes to speak with Fred. Fred is so thankful that it is impossible for Oliver to get the tractor back.
28	28	"Send a Boy to College"	Richard L. Bare	Jay Sommers & Dick Chevillat	May 4, 1966	27
Lisa tells Oliver that breakfast is ready and she made a surprise. Oliver tries to sneak out of the house, but Lisa catches him. The same thing happens with Eb. The Ziffels come by with Arnold. Arnold is sick and they want Eb to look at him. Oliver discovers that Eb has a way with sick animals. Sam tells Oliver and Lisa that Doc Stuart always said that Eb should've been a veterinarian. Lisa thinks that Oliver should send Eb to college. Oliver asks Hank about some local colleges. Hank recommends County College. Haney arrives at the house driving a 1915 Stutz Bearcat and wearing a raccoon coat. Haney tries to sell Oliver a college kit for Eb. Eb shows Lisa and Oliver his new suit for college. Lisa tries to tell Eb about girls. The next day, Eb leaves for college and Oliver and Lisa already miss him. But, before the day is over, he is back. Eb was rejected because he never graduated from high school.
29	29	"Horse? What Horse?"	Richard L. Bare	Jay Sommers & Dick Chevillat	May 11, 1966	29
Oliver is repairing a leak in the tractor's pipe, but then the radiator starts leaking. He calls Sam about getting a new radiator. Lisa and Eb believe that Oliver's beginning to crack under the pressure of running the farm. A horse follows Oliver home, but every time he tries to show it to his wife, the horse disappears. Lisa assumes that her husband is imagining things and calls Doc Stuart (George Chandler). Oliver tries to tell Doc Stuart that there is nothing wrong with him, but the doctor is not too sure. Lisa's attempt to slip Oliver a sedative backfires. It results in her falling asleep just when Oliver sees a zebra in the window. When he looks again, the zebra is gone. Mr. Sanders (Jerry Hausner) explains to Haney that his circus truck over turned and some of his animals got away. Haney manages to con some money out of Sanders. Mr. Sanders asks Haney to help him catch his animals. Oliver then sees a camel. Lisa tells Hank that Oliver has been seeing animals. While talking to Oliver, Hank sees a chimp which then disappears. Oliver thinks Hank is being condescending. Haney comes by and explains what is going on. Oliver is happy he is not going crazy, but is then knocked down by a boxing kangaroo.
30	30	"The Rains Came"	Richard L. Bare	S : Howard Merrill and Stan Dreben; T : Jay Sommers & Dick Chevillat	May 18, 1966	31
Oliver, Lisa and Eb arrive in court. Mr. Haney is suing Oliver for non-payment of a vital contract. Oliver meets Haney's lawyer, Diller Fangworth (J. Pat O'Malley). The Bailiff (Ray Kellogg) announces Judge Clemens (Howard Smith). There was a 90 day drought in Hooterville. Oliver apparently agreed to pay Haney $350 if he could bring some relief. When the rains eventually arrived, Oliver refused to pay because he said Haney did not cause the rain. Oliver claims it was Lisa that caused it to rain. Eb is on the stand and he recalls a day when Lisa was talking to her sunflower, Rudolph. She believes that if one waters a sunflower every day, it will grant you a wish. Oliver, desperate for rain, water's Rudolph. The next witness is Hank, who is no help. After a recess, Haney is on the stand. Haney recalls how he told Oliver that for $100 his Native American friend Chief Thundercloud (Robert Strauss) can make it rain. Oliver turns them down. After several more dry days, Oliver agrees to pay $350 if Thundercloud makes it rain. The Chief is unsuccessful and Oliver kicks them out. Thundercloud recalls how he then asked Lisa for a job and he wound up washing Oliver's car. It starts to storm and rain. Oliver claims that it was the act of washing his car that caused it to rain, since every time you wash a car it rains. Judge Clemens dismisses the case because neither act could really cause the rain.
31	31	"Culture"	Richard L. Bare	Jay Sommers & Dick Chevillat	May 25, 1966	30
The Every-Other-Wednesday-Afternoon-Discussion-Club is having a meeting at the Douglas house. Oliver gets upset that Eb is babysitting Emory Durkin (Buddy Foster), Horace Milford and Arnold the pig instead of working. Then Oliver finds out that Ralph is reading the minutes of the meeting instead of fixing his closet door with Alf. The Club decides that Hooterville needs a little "culture" in the form of a symphony orchestra. Oliver thinks the women are "nuts" for considering such a silly idea. Oliver tries to explain to Lisa how many people are needed for an orchestra. He says that a small town like Hooterville should have band concerts in the park. Oliver imagines it being a hundred years ago and he and Lisa are listening to an old time band. Lisa brings in a New York conductor friend named Sir Geoffrey (Reginald Gardiner). Oliver tries to warn Sir Geoffrey about the talent in town. Oliver does not want to go to the first rehearsal, but Lisa talks him into it. Sir Geoffrey is a little surprised when he learns that the town's only musicians are The Hooterville Volunteer Fire Department Band. Haney arrives and tries to sell Sir Geoffrey new conductor batons. Eb is confused by the paper with black dots on it. He is told that is the music. Oliver keeps telling Sir Geoffrey that he should left town. When Sir Geoffrey starts the rehearsal, he learns that the band only knows one song. Virginia Sale as Selma Plout.
32	32	"Uncle Ollie"	Richard L. Bare	Dick Chevillat & Elon Packard	June 1, 1966	32
Oliver is building a fireplace in the bedroom. He runs out of mortar, so he uses some of Lisa's hotcake batter. Eb comes in through the closet and the closet door falls down. This causes the fireplace to fall apart. Eb gives Oliver a letter from his sister Cynthia saying that his nephew Charles is coming for a visit. Chuck arrives on a motorcycle, has long hair and speaks "hip lingo". Chuck is to share Eb's room in the barn. Chuck is surprised at how early everyone gets up. Oliver tells him this is a farm and he insists that Chuck help with the chores, but Chuck has no interest in work. Eb starts to like Chuck's way of life. Chuck soon learns that there is no "action" in Hooterville. Hank comes by and Oliver is working on his tractor. They have a confusing conversation about Chuck. Chuck is excellent with motors and proceeds to "soup up" the tractor. Oliver winds up getting a speeding ticket for going 80 mph. The Officer (Jack Perkins) takes Oliver to see Judge Murdock. Oliver is fined $25. Haney comes by and tries to charge Oliver for damage he claims Oliver did when he raced by Haney's place. Haney's truck will not start. Chuck repairs Haney's truck with the engine out of Oliver's car. Oliver and Haney get more speeding tickets. Oliver is thrilled when Chuck says he is leaving.

=== Season 2 (1966–67) ===
No. overall	No. in season	Title	Directed by	Written by	Original release date	Prod. code
33	1	"Wings Over Hooterville"	Richard L. Bare	Jay Sommers & Dick Chevillat	September 14, 1966	33
Oliver wants to enter some of his corn in the Annual Hooterville Corn Festival. Eb discovers something eating the corn plants. At Sam's store, the men want Oliver to be the grand marshall of the Veterans Parade to Crabwell Corners. Lisa tells the men about the first time she and Oliver met. Oliver had to bail out of his plane after his engine failed during a mission in World War II. Lisa was working for the Hungarian Underground when her and Janos (Oscar Beregi) found him hanging in a tree. Lisa has a sexy way of stopping a German tank and Janos then blows it up. Lisa keeps mentioning marriage to Oliver. Back to the present and Eb shows up at Sam's store. Eb shows Oliver an eaten up leaf from the corn. Hank holds a meeting and identifies the insect as the dreaded "Bing Bug". Hank suggests burning the crops. The idea of crop dusting comes up and everyone volunteers Oliver to do the flying. Oliver goes to where the plane is and finds that Haney has bought it. Oliver takes the plane up and winds up falling out of it. Lisa finds him hanging in a tree again. The plane crashes into Oliver's corn crops and burns two acres. The smoke gets rid of the Bing Bugs.
34	2	"Water, Water Everywhere"	Richard L. Bare	Jay Sommers & Dick Chevillat	September 21, 1966	35
After his well dries up, Haney has Willie the Well-Witcher (Percy Helton) find a new spot to dig a well. Once Haney is connected to the water, the Douglases lose theirs. Oliver and Eb crawl under the house looking for the pump. Oliver knocks over a beam and the fire place crashes down on him. They find the pump and it is working fine. Oliver tells Sam that his well went dry. Haney comes by and tells Oliver about Wille. Oliver figures out that Willie tapped into his well, but he cannot do anything about it. Oliver hires Willie to find a new well for him. When Oliver's water is hooked up, the Ziffles' water dries up. After a few more rounds of this, Oliver calls a town meeting. Arnold keeps interrupting the meeting by having Oliver's TV on too loud. Oliver suggests that the town build a community reservoir. Later, Oliver tells Sam, Haney and Fred that he made several inquiries about the cost of the reservoir. Hank does a survey and says that the best place for the reservoir would be the Douglas farm. Oliver refuses to give up his farm. Something Lisa says gives Oliver an idea. Oliver then suggests that the town run a pipe from the Pixley reservoir. When the pump is switched on, the whole valley loses their electricity.
35	3	"I Didn't Raise My Pig to Be a Soldier"	Richard L. Bare	S : Elon Packard and Norman Hudis; T : Jay Sommers & Dick Chevillat	September 28, 1966	37
Oliver is trying to repair his tractor and Lisa just makes things worse. Oliver and Lisa agree to "pig sit" Arnold while the Ziffels enjoy a second honeymoon at Niagara Falls. The Ziffels bring over Arnold's bath tub, TV and crib. That night, Arnold is crying because Oliver made him sleep in the barn. Eb brings Arnold to the house so he can sleep in his crib. In the morning, Alf and Ralph come by and wake Oliver up. Arnold receives a draft notice ordering him to report for his physical the next day. Oliver says it is a mistake and they should ignore it. Mr. Grimes (Ray Teal) and Mr. Collins (Lester Dorr) from the Selective Service Board realize that Arnold never showed up. After going to the Ziffel house, the men try Oliver's house. They tell Lisa that Arnold must show up. Oliver brings Arnold to the draft board, but the Sergeant (Tom D'Andrea) does not believe the pig is Arnold. Two men from the FBI (John Stephenson and James Seay) come to the Douglas house with a warrant for Arnold. Oliver keeps trying to explain that Arnold is a pig. Hank comes by. When the men ask Hank if he knows Arnold, things get a little confusing. The FBI men throw Oliver in jail. Oliver tells Lisa to call the Ziffels and tell them to come home. Oliver finally gets the FBI to understand. Ralph Monroe then receives a draft notice and Oliver tries to explain things to the Sergeant.
36	4	"How to See South America By Bus"	Richard L. Bare	S : Walter Black; T : Jay Sommers & Dick Chevillat	October 5, 1966	36
Oliver tells Lisa that a farmer named Collins wants to talk to him about a legal matter. They both assume Collins is a man. Lisa meets Amy Collins (Dianne Foster), the lovely young female farmer. Lisa will not tell Amy that Oliver is out in his corn field. Amy goes and finds Oliver. Oliver meets Amy and agrees to come over to her farm and help her. Amy is apparently a very knowledgeable farmer. When Oliver tells Lisa he is going to Amy's farm, he can tell she is a little jealous. Oliver spends the day looking over Amy's farm. They get back to her house and Oliver realizes they did not discuss the legal matter. It is dinner time and Oliver says he should head home. It turns out Amy is also a good cook and Oliver decides to stay. Lisa becomes jealous of the time the two spent together. Oliver invites Amy over for dinner to discuss farming. Lisa asks Hank to teach her about farming. Amy arrives for dinner and Lisa starts reciting some farm facts. Lisa has a little too much champagne. The next morning, Lisa wakes up with a slight hangover and Oliver left a note saying he is at Amy's. Lisa and Eb go to Sam's store. Lisa overhears Mrs. Ziffel describe the plot on her favorite soap opera to Sadie Prentiss. Lisa now believes that Oliver and Amy are going to run off to South America together. Oliver speaks to Mrs. Ziffel, figures out the misunderstanding and explains it to Lisa. Note: Similar to the plot of the 1947 film The Egg and I (Film))
37	5	"The Ugly Duckling"	Richard L. Bare	Jay Sommers & Dick Chevillat	October 19, 1966	34
Lisa and Oliver wake up to find Haney attempting to disconnect their phone up on the pole. Oliver refuses to pay the bill until the phone company runs the phone line into the house. Oliver learns that Lisa made a lot of phone calls to places in Europe. Ralph is devastated that Hank Kimball stood her up on yet another date. She asks Lisa to make her more feminine. Roy Trendell (Robert Foulk), from the phone company, comes by. There is a confusing conversation about Ralph trying on dresses. Oliver then shows Trendell where the phone in the house is. Lisa says she will need a couple days to work on Ralph and she will be staying at the house. This means that Oliver is forced to sleep in the barn with Eb. The first night sleeping with Eb does not go well. The next night is no better as Oliver falls out of the loft in the barn. Oliver has had enough and decides to invite Hank over for dinner. Tom Blackwell (Dave Willock) comes to run the phone line and Lisa invites him to dinner as well. Lisa wants to pretend Tom is Ralph's boyfriend to make Hank jealous. That night at dinner, Lisa mentions engagements and both men leave in a hurry. Oliver learns that Blackwell was going to connect the phone and goes chasing after him.
38	6	"One of Our Assemblymen is Missing"	Richard L. Bare	Jay Sommers & Dick Chevillat	October 26, 1966	38
Eb, Lisa and some people in town lament that Oliver does not seem to fly off the handle anymore. Oliver goes to Sam's store to get something for Lisa. The men there try to get Oliver worked up, with no luck. Oliver receives a tax bill for $12.03 from the State Farm Unattached Duty Tax Bureau. No one in Hooterville knows what the tax is for, but they have always paid it. Oliver gets riled up and delivers a speech about not paying the tax and that farmers are the backbone of the country. Back at home, Hank comes by and Oliver asks him what the tax is for. Hank is no help. Oliver cannot contact the State Farm Bureau, so he wants to reach his assemblyman but does not know who he is. He learns Hooterville has not held an election for an assemblyman since 1922. Oliver decides to go talk to the Governor (Roy Roberts). Haney comes by and tries to sell some state souvenirs to Oliver. Oliver and Lisa travel to the state capital and wind up in a tiny hotel room. Oliver cannot get in to see the Governor. Lisa makes a call and gets him an appointment. Oliver gets the Governor to agree to refund all the tax money the people of Hooterville paid for the last 40 years. The Governor then sends a 3 million dollar bill to Hooterville for all the work the state has done around the town. Mary Treen as Telephone Operator.
39	7	"The Good Old Days"	Richard L. Bare	Jay Sommers & Dick Chevillat	November 2, 1966	39
Oliver tells Lisa about book he is reading on farm life in 1887. He would like her to have a greater appreciation of being a farm wife. The story goes that poor farmer Gus Thompson (Eddie Albert) sends for Gladys to be his wife. His friend Olaf Simpson (Peter Whitney) has sent for Greta. The stagecoach arrives with Greta but not Gladys. Etta Thompson (Eva Gabor), Greta's cousin, is on the coach and tells Gus that Gladys is married. Etta is supposed to take Gladys' place. At first Gus says no, but then he marries Etta. Gus and Etta cleared the land and start a farm from scratch. Prentiss the Peddler (Pat Buttram) tries to sell Gus a lot of stuff. Gus does wind up having to buy Etta a dress. Olaf invites Gus and Etta over for a square dance. Olaf and Gus get into a fight. Etta eventually has 7 children and their farm grew larger. One day the river overflowed and flooded Gus' farm. Gus, Jr. (Tom Lester) says that he and the other children are going to the big city. Etta tells Gus they will start over. Etta has 15 more children and the years passed. Etta tells Gus she is glad they got married. After Oliver is finished telling the story, Lisa says she is still not cut out to be a farm wife.
40	8	"Eb Discovers the Birds and the Bees"	Richard L. Bare	Jay Sommers & Dick Chevillat	November 9, 1966	40
Eb sees Betty Jo Bradley at Druckers store and is suddenly smitten with her. Thinking of Oliver as a father, Eb asks him for some advice on romance. Oliver recalls the first time he asked Lisa for a date. They were aboard a ship, where Oliver was playing in the band. Eb asks Betty Jo for a date on Saturday night and she says yes. Eb does not know where to take her. Lisa tells him to let Betty Jo pick a place. Oliver recalls letting Lisa pick a restaurant and it wound up costing him a fortune. Among other things, every time he said the word champagne, they opened a new bottle. Eb tries to follow Oliver's advice, but he messes things up and Betty Jo cancels their date. Oliver reluctantly goes to explain things to Betty Jo. Bobbie Jo thinks that Oliver is asking Betty Jo for a date. The date is back on and they are to go to a dance. Eb says he cannot dance and Oliver is forced to teach him. Eb fantasizes that he is dancing with Betty Jo and they wind up dancing professionally. Oliver gives Eb some roses to give to Betty Jo. What should have been a nice gesture, ruins Eb's date because Betty Jo is allergic to roses. Maurice Marsac as Headwaiter. Joyce Nizzari as Cigarette Girl. Guest Stars from Petticoat Junction: Linda Kaye as Betty Jo Bradley, Lori Saunders as Bobbie Jo Bradley
41	9	"The Hooterville Image"	Richard L. Bare	Jay Sommers & Dick Chevillat	November 16, 1966	41
Oliver is excited when he thinks that Lisa is ironing his shirts. It was actually Eb that did it. Ralph and Alf come by and Ralph says how good looking Oliver is in his suit. Oliver is going out to do some farm work in his suit. The farmers of Hooterville Valley fear that Oliver is ruining their image by continuing to wear a suit and tie when he does his chores. Fred says they need to show Oliver how ridiculous he looks when farming in city clothes. Meanwhile, Ralph and Alf fix Oliver's closet door so it does not fall off. But now the door will not open at all. Oliver now notices that all the farmers, Floyd and Charlie are dressed in suits. Oliver complains to Lisa that everyone is making fun of him. The Monroe brothers work on the closet door and now it falls off again. Hank has a confusing conversation with Oliver about the way he dresses. Oliver agrees to wear overalls. Lisa has ordered some overalls for Oliver from her dressmaker. They cost $150 and are made with Italian silk, real fur and gold buttons. Lisa makes him try the overalls on and Oliver thinks he looks ridiculous. Some of the men see Oliver in the overalls and think he is making fun of them. Oliver buys a real pair of overalls. The other farmers have to keep wearing the suits because their wives burned their overalls. The farmers insist Oliver start wearing his suit again..
42	10	"You Ought to Be in Pictures"	Richard L. Bare	Jay Sommers & Dick Chevillat	November 23, 1966	42
Oliver is to give an acceptance speech to the Chamber of Commerce. At the meeting, the members discuss how to bring outside money to Hooterville. Haney tries to sell Oliver some Chamber of Commerce paraphernalia. They vote to invite a Hollywood picture company to film a movie in the Valley. Oliver has written to Washington seeking advice on growing his crops. James Stuart (Bernie Kopell), from the Agricultural Department, wants to do a film about city people buying a farm and their chance of failure. Mr. Melvin (Byron Foulger), having read Oliver's letter, suggests to James that he call Oliver. James has a very confusing call with people at Drucker's store. They think he is movie actor "Jimmy Stewart" and they all will be in a movie. Hank has a confusing conversation with Oliver about the letter he wrote to Washington. Hank also mentions that many of the locals have enrolled in Haney's acting school. Oliver interrupts Haney's class and tells them they are crazy if they think they will be actors. Mr. Stuart arrives and asks where he can find Oliver. The towns folk learn that he wants to make a documentary film about Oliver's farm. They find out there will be no Hollywood film. Mr. Stuart returns to Washington with a film that did not turn out as expected.
43	11	"A Home Isn't Built in a Day"	Richard L. Bare	Dick Chevillat & Elon Packard and Jay Sommers	November 30, 1966	43
Tired of living in a dump, Lisa threatens to leave Oliver unless he completely renovates their farmhouse. Oliver fires the Monroe brothers. Haney tries to sell Sam some chicken foot backscratchers. Oliver asks Sam if he knows of any architects. Sam recommends Dillwell Pinkley (Richard Erdman), from Pixley. Haney tells Oliver to not make any changes to that historical building. Oliver brings Dillwell to the house. They have a confusing conversation with Lisa and Hank. Dillwell draws up some really nice sketches. There is a little question about the price, but that gets rectified. The morning the work is to start, contractor Eli Boone and his men are there, but not working. They will not cross the Monroes' picket line. It turns out that Eli is Alf and Ralph's uncle. Oliver works things out and Eli will come back the next day. The next morning Eli again is not working. Haney serves Oliver an injunction to stop working on the historical landmark. Eli is Haney's cousin. Oliver's house is the birthplace of famous Hootervillian Rutherford B. Skrug. Lisa will put up with the way the house is for now.
44	12	"A Square is Not Round"	Richard L. Bare	Elroy Schwartz	December 14, 1966	44
A chicken mystery develops on the Douglas farm when Lisa reveals that one of the hens is laying square eggs. Amid that, Oliver cannot figure out why the toaster now operates by the sound of saying "five". Oliver mentions his toaster issue to the boys at Drucker's. They say he has an old model, the new models work when you say "eight". Eb plays a practical joke on Oliver by saying that Eleanore the cow is giving different flavors of milk. Oliver tries to figure out which chicken is laying the square egg by putting them in separate cages. Hank comes by and Oliver tells him about the square eggs. Hank tells Oliver that a Mr. Moody (James Westerfield) has been trying to breed a chicken that lays square eggs. Hearing that the square egg laying chicken may be valuable, Haney tries to buy back the chickens from Oliver. He then offers Oliver his chicken watching service. Mr. Moody comes by and Oliver sells his chickens to him for a large amount of money. Lisa is sad that Oliver sold her friends. Several days later, Moody brings the chickens back saying none of them laid a square egg. Moody thinks that Oliver played a trick on him. After he leaves, one of them lays a square egg. The next morning, the mystery is solved. Oliver dreamed the whole thing.
45	13	"An Old-fashioned Christmas"	Richard L. Bare	Jay Sommers and Buddy Atkinson	December 21, 1966	46
Flashing back 7 years in New York, Oliver has a hard time getting a live tree for Christmas. Back in modern day Hooterville, Oliver is determined to have an old-fashioned Christmas. He finds a tree he wants to cut down. Lisa mentions how warm it is and that it is probably snowing in New York. Meanwhile, Haney tries to sell Oliver a transistor radio necktie. Haney informs Oliver that chopping trees down is prohibited by the state forest conservation law. When Oliver says he does not believe it, Haney tells him to ask Sam. Sam is showing Fred the artificial tree he is now selling. Fred says he liked the aluminum trees he used to sell. Oliver comes by. The trees Sam now sells squirt "genuine spruce spray" from the top. They also ooze fake sap. Sam's also selling wax popcorn strands and fiberglass candy canes. Sam tells Oliver to ask Hank about chopping down his own tree. After some confusion, Oliver gets a permit from Hank to chop down a tree. Doris tells Fred that she thinks Oliver is right about having an old fashioned Christmas. Some of the neighbors come by to see Oliver's real Christmas tree. They intend to stay and listen to Oliver sing some songs. But they all leave when they see Lisa's "hotscake fruitscake". Oliver looks out the window and it is snowing. Lisa had Haney toss soap flakes off the roof. Vince Barnett as Harry.
46	14	"Never Trust a Little Old Lady"	Richard L. Bare	Jay Sommers & Dick Chevillat & Al Schwartz	December 28, 1966	48
Oliver learns that most of the community relies on the TV newscast's Mildred, a little old lady who steps out of a tiny dollhouse with or without an umbrella, to show if it will rain. There is also a little old man who sometimes comes out. It is tomato planting season and Oliver cannot find an accurate means of predicting the weather. This time Mildred came out with the umbrella and everyone at Drucker's store is preparing for heavy rain. Oliver does not believe it as there is not a cloud in the sky. Eb tells Oliver that Walter, the singing radio weatherman, predicted a drought. Oliver wants to get to Pixley to get his tomato plants. Charley thinks it is going to rain and Floyd thinks there'll be a drought. Oliver starts to plant his tomatoes. Haney comes by and wants Oliver to invest in an automatic tomato planter. Oliver has a dream where Lisa is the little old lady and he is the old man. Hooterville suffers the coldest night of the year and there is frost on the ground. Oliver takes all of his tomato plants out of the ground and brings them inside. Hank brings Oliver a weather almanac. Oliver contacts the Weather Bureau in Washington which predicts warm days and nights. Everyone replants their crops. That night there is another frost. Lisa's Crepe Suzettes save the crops from the cold. Jack Bailey as Announcer.
47	15	"School Days"	Richard L. Bare	Jay Sommers & Dick Chevillat	January 4, 1967	49
Lisa is trying to make homemade bread. Things are not going well and Oliver wonders when she is going to learn how to cook. Oliver wants Lisa to enroll at the Hooterville High School to take a class in domestic science. Lisa speaks with Principal Russell (George Ives) and enrolls in several classes. At her first day in class, Lisa constantly interrupts teacher Mrs. Hockmeister (Sarah Selby). Principal Russell tells Oliver that Lisa is a disruptive influence. Oliver tells Lisa to behave in class and she informs him that he will be part of the students car pool. Oliver is brought back to the Principal's office after Lisa blows up the chemistry lab. Russell suggests that Oliver take Lisa out of school. Lisa disrupts Mr. Dillman's (Walker Edmiston) history class with her own version of Hungary's past. Oliver once again has to see Russell. Lisa takes Tom Blackwell's (Dave Willock) Driver's Education Course. After some confusion, Lisa drives into the girl's shower room. Oliver talks to Principal Russell again and learns Lisa has been expelled. Lisa shows Oliver the cheerleader routine she was going to do had she not been kicked out of school. Charles Briles as Boy #1.
48	16	"His Honor"	Richard L. Bare	Dick Chevillat & Al Schwartz	January 11, 1967	47
Eb is having problems with the tractor again. He and Oliver find out that Lisa took a part out of the tractor to help her make a new breakfast,"Hots Kabobs". Meanwhile, no one wants to volunteer to be a livestock judge at the annual fair. Oliver misunderstands when Sam asks him to be the judge. The Douglases travel to New York so Oliver can get some judging advice from Judge Crandell (Grandon Rhodes). In New York, Mother Douglas barely says hello to Oliver. She immediately wants to go shopping with Lisa. Oliver tells Eunice his good news. Back in Hooterville, Roy Trendell is upset that Oliver was made livestock judge, the position he held. Sam apologizes as they thought Roy was not interested. Roy tells Sam to call Oliver and make him the apple judge. Lisa received the telephone message and Oliver thinks he is being appointed an appellate judge. Oliver does not get much help from Judge Crandell. Lisa bought a robe and wig for Oliver. Back at home, Oliver gets a ticket for speeding, which Lisa tears up. Oliver tells Judge Wilkins (Stanley Farrar) that Sam appointed him an appellate judge. Wilkins calls Sam and Sam has Hank go to Oliver to clear up the misunderstanding. After some confusion, Hank tells Oliver he is just an apple judge. At the fair, the other judges show up in robes, so Oliver wears his. Bobs Watson as Bell Hop.
49	17	"It's So Peaceful in the Country"	Richard L. Bare	David Braverman and Bob Marcus	January 18, 1967	45
Lisa is visiting Mother Eunice Douglas in New York because she is not feeling well. Dr. Faber (Vinton Hayworth) says Eunice needs complete rest and should go somewhere quiet. Lisa calls Oliver to tell him his mother is coming for a visit. There is some confusion because of the party line. Eunice comes to Hooterville and Lisa and Oliver give her their room. Oliver and Lisa will stay in Eb's room. That night everyone is awakened by Eb driving the noisy tractor coming back from a date. Then Eunice has to climb the pole to answer the phone and she falls off. In the morning, Ralph and Alf wake Eunice up. The next night, thinking it will be quieter, they put Eunice in Eb's room in the barn. Oliver discovers four Native Americans who have set up a camp on his farm. Chief Yellow Horse (J. Carrol Naish) tells Oliver that Haney let them come there every year to do their bear dance. Hank comes by and he has a confusing conversation with Oliver about the Natives. Yellow Horse has taken a fancy to Eunice. He sends his Medicine Man to help make her feel better, which does not work. Haney capitalizes on the Sioux event and offers tours through the Douglas' home. Yellow Horse tells Oliver they will leave if Eunice can go with them. With the help of Lisa's hotcakes, the Sioux leave.
50	18	"Exodus to Bleedswell"	Richard L. Bare	Jay Sommers & Dick Chevillat	January 25, 1967	50
Haney informs Oliver that many of the residents of Hooterville are moving to Bleedswell for jobs at the new defense plant. Alf, Ralph and Eb are interested in going. The Ziffel's are going as well. Lisa is sad that all her friends are leaving. She asks Oliver why they cannot have a defense plant in town. Oliver speaks to Sam, who then calls a town council meeting. They vote to reopen an old airplane factory in town and make Oliver president. Roy Trendell thinks he should be president. Sam and Roy tell Oliver they have a contract with the Army that was signed in World War 1. General Sloat (Herbert Rudley) of the Air Force receives a letter from Hooterville about making the planes. Sloat says the letter must be from some nut. Oliver visits the factory in an old barn. To get in, he has to buy a badge from Haney. Alf and Ralph got plans for the plane from a model airplane kit. Needing money for nails and wood, they write another letter to Sloat. Sloat asks Mr. Travis (Damian O'Flynn), from the Attorney Generals office, if the contract is still valid and finds out it is. Sloat travels to Hooterville to reason with them. Sloat tells Oliver he is to test fly the first plane. Lisa christens the plane and it falls apart.
51	19	"It's Human to be Humane"	Richard L. Bare	Sam Locke and Joel Rapp	February 1, 1967	51
Lisa gets her hand stuck in the dishwasher. While Oliver is trying to get her hand out, Lisa complains that he never talks to her anymore. Lisa gets her hand out, but then Oliver gets stuck. Oliver figures out that they made a profit of $16.42 in their first year on the farm. Lisa keeps complaining that she has nothing to do and no one to talk to. Oliver tells her to get a hobby. Oliver goes to Sam's to buy a bolt for his tractor. Sam suggests several things he could buy for Lisa so she does not get bored. After Oliver speaks with Doris Ziffel, Lisa becomes the head of the "Hooterville Human Humane Committee." First she tells Newt Kiley that selling chicken eggs is off limits. Then duck hunting and setting mouse traps is forbidden. Soon, the Douglas' house is full of animals. The locals quickly tire of Lisa's animal protection demands. Hank comes by with a petition to run Lisa out of town. Oliver tells Hank that he will think of something. Lisa agrees to resign when Oliver comes by with a mink coat.
52	20	"Never Take Your Wife to a Convention"	Richard L. Bare	Jay Sommers & Dick Chevillat	February 8, 1967	52
Oliver is surprised that no one from Hooterville is being sent to the State Farming convention. When he finds out it is just a matter of money, Oliver decides he will go. Oliver and Lisa have a hard time checking into the hotel. While there, Oliver runs into Wanda (Barbara Nichols), who he met long ago at the Boston Follies. They then meet Wanda's husband Charlie (Jesse White). Lisa remembers Charlie because his father was Lisa's mother's bootlegger. Charlie worked for his uncle, a bookie, but is now a farmer. The more Charlie talks about his farm, the more Oliver's convinced that his criminal days are not in the past. Oliver comes home having seen none of the convention as Charlie and Wanda keep them out partying the whole time. Oliver tells Eb to not bother him as he wants to sleep for three days. Charlie and Wanda make a surprise visit. Charlie cannot believe Oliver's farmhouse. Wanda gives Lisa a fur coat and some jewelry. Charlie wants to help Oliver and gets him a new tractor and other items. Oliver wants to send everything back. Oliver later learns from Sam that all his gifts have been reported stolen. The Pixley bank was robbed and Lisa finds a bag of money. Oliver has to convince the sheriff that he did not steal all these items. George N. Neise as Clerk. Murray Alper as Louie. Phil Gordon as Bellboy.
53	21	"The Computer Age"	Richard L. Bare	Jay Sommers & Dick Chevillat	February 15, 1967	54
Some of the men are at Sam's store discussing how computers will eventually run the farms. Oliver believes it could happen. Meanwhile, Alf and Ralph fix the falling closet door by attaching it to the frame. Now, the whole closet and door move together. Ralph wants to go to a computer dating service to meet a husband. Oliver thinks it is a great idea and gives her the money for it. Lisa thinks that nothing works as well as romance. Lisa bets Oliver that if they went to the computer service, they would not be paired together. They go to see Mr. Blisswell (Francis DeSales) at the dating service. Oliver explains the reason they are there. The computer does not match them up. Oliver asks Blisswell to try again, but the results are the same. Lisa now will not let Oliver in their bedroom. Haney offers Oliver an apologizing service. Lisa and Oliver make up. A man named George comes by and says he was paired up with Lisa. When Oliver kicks George out, George punches him in the nose. Ralph is paired up with Oliver.
54	22	"Never Start Talking Unless Your Voice Comes Out"	Richard L. Bare	Jay Sommers & Dick Chevillat	February 22, 1967	53
Eb is talking to Oliver. But his lips move and then the voice comes out. Eb bangs his head and then his lips and voice are in sync. Oliver goes to Sam's to pick up his mail. He receives an official-looking letter from Washington, D.C. Oliver also wants to buy an anniversary present. It has been one year since he has moved to the farm. Sam and Haney fight over who will sell Oliver the present. Oliver opens the letter, but will not tell any of the men there what the letter says. After he leaves, Haney says he must be a tax dodger. Oliver tells Lisa that he has been offered a senior partner job at Brad Wingate's law firm. Brad's firm has many cases tried before the Supreme Court. Oliver now has to choose between being a farmer or a lawyer. Lisa talks to Doris Ziffel about their possible move. In an effort to keep the Douglas' in town, the town's people try and find legal cases for Oliver. Oliver is touched that the people are making up cases because they want him to stay. Haney finds it suspicious that Oliver would give up a big paying job when he makes no money farming. Hank tells Oliver that everyone thinks he is a counterfeiter, smuggler and bootlegger. Eb comes by and tells Oliver that he got a call from Washington. Hank now thinks he is with the C.I.A. Some of the men come by and Oliver plays along that he is a spy.
55	23	"The Beverly Hillbillies"	Richard L. Bare	Jay Sommers & Dick Chevillat	March 1, 1967	55
Things do not go well when Lisa tries to make spaghetti for dinner. Eb mentions that the Hooterville Community Players are going to put on a production to raise money for a clubhouse. The next morning Eb tells Lisa and Oliver that they decided to do a show of "The Beverly Hillbillies". Sam asks Lisa and Oliver if they want to be in the show. Oliver says he is not an actor, but Lisa tells how she was an actress in Hungary. Oliver complains that Eb has been oversleeping the past five days because of play rehearsals. Because Oliver will never let him use the car, Eb buys a used scooter. Eb cannot control the scooter and gets thrown off of it. Eb sprains his ankle. Doc Wilson (Harry Antrim) tells Eb he will be able to be in the play in a couple days. As he cannot get out of bed, Eb annoys Oliver with requests for things. Haney comes by and tries to sell Oliver things to help take care of Eb. Lisa helps Eb rehearse his lines. Eb made a few changes to "punch up" a script from the series. Hank comes by to tell Eb that some of the cast has taken ill. Eb hurts his ankle again. Hank winds up playing Jed Clampett, Oliver appears as Jethro, and Lisa portrays Granny with a Hungarian/southern accent. During the play, Oliver breaks his toe. Now he and Eb are laid up in the same bed.
56	24	"Lisa's Vegetable Garden"	Richard L. Bare	Jay Sommers & Dick Chevillat	March 8, 1967	56
Instead of buying vegetables, Oliver thinks a farm wife should grow her own. Lisa agrees to start a garden. Meanwhile, Oliver's tractor falls apart again. Eb wonders who he will have to help with their farming, Lisa or Oliver. Oliver says he doubts Lisa will really start the garden. Lisa goes to Hank for help growing vegetables and he gives her several useless pamphlets. Oliver helps Lisa figure out how much land she will need for the garden. Oliver thinks he has the tractor fixed, but it just falls apart again. He goes to some of the other farmers hoping to borrow one of theirs. No one has a tractor to spare. Oliver buys a plow horse from Haney. Things do not go well with the horse. Lisa drives by with a brand new tractor. She hires Alf and Ralph as her housekeepers. Lisa then buys $900 worth of farm supplies from Sam. Oliver tells her not to spend any more money and return everything she bought. After six weeks, she shows Oliver a barren field. She tells him, because he told her to not spend any more money, she did not buy any seeds.
57	25	"The Saucer Season"	Richard L. Bare	T : Jay Sommers & Dick Chevillat; S/T : Sam Locke & Joel Rapp	March 15, 1967	57
Lisa brings Oliver everything for a picnic lunch except the food. Hank comes by and tells a skeptical Oliver about flying saucer sightings in the area. Eb claims he saw a flying saucer. That night Lisa and Oliver are woken up by Eb talking outside. Eb tells Oliver there was another flying saucer and he was talking to the little green men. The next morning, Oliver tells Eb he must have been dreaming. Eb still maintains he saw the saucer and he even tells Oliver some of the alien words. Lisa tells Sam what Eb claims he saw. Sam prints the story in the local paper. Haney agrees to be Eb's agent. Haney also brings a bunch of tourists to the Douglas house. Oliver kicks them out. Haney now has a lot of alien souvenirs unsold. Oliver now has to worry about the crowds trampling his crops. Oliver is then frightened when he sees a little man in a space suit and ray gun. It turns out to just be a little boy (Buddy Foster). Lieutenant Bennett (Bob Hastings), from the Air Force, comes by to speak with Eb. Bennett has a confusing conversation with Eb and leaves. Dan White as Man. Sam Riddle as Radio Announcer.
58	26	"Getting Even With Haney"	Richard L. Bare	Jay Sommers & Dick Chevillat	March 22, 1967	59
Doris is at the Douglas house doing her laundry. Fred comes by and Doris says she is tired of beating their laundry on a rock in the creek. While that is going on, Oliver has a hard time believing that Arnold could write a note. Haney sends a giant statue to Oliver claiming Oliver ordered it. Oliver returns it and tells Haney one day he will go too far and Oliver will get him. Oliver learns from Lisa that Fred bought a Grabwell washing machine from Haney. The machine goes crazy, spraying water and clothes everywhere, before chasing the Ziffels out their front door. The inside of the Ziffel house is destroyed. Fred is furious and wants to shoot Haney. Oliver talks Fred into taking Haney to court and he will be their lawyer. In court Oliver learns that Judge Smith (Nolan Leary) is Haney's cousin. They then have a Lady Judge (Louise Lorimer), but she turns out to be the Aunt of Haney's lawyer. They finally wind up with Judge Jones (Grandon Rhodes). Oliver has a hard time presenting his opening statement. Oliver does win the case and Haney owes the Ziffels $250. Doris insists that Fred pay Oliver a fee. Haney tries to pay his fine with some of his merchandise, but Oliver refuses. Haney holds an auction to raise money. Something Lisa does helps Haney raise the money. Things get worse when Oliver sends Lisa to rectify the situation.
59	27	"Kimball Gets Fired"	Richard L. Bare	Jay Sommers & Dick Chevillat	March 29, 1967	60
Hank tells Oliver that he has a new chief named Mr. Treffinger (Parley Baer) who fired him. Oliver has a confusing conversation with Lisa about Hank being fired. Ralph is distraught when she learns her beloved "Hankie" was fired. Now Hank cannot afford to get married. Lisa and Ralph want Oliver to go talk to Treffinger, but he will not do it. Lisa goes to speak with Treffinger. They have a confusing conversation about Hank getting his job back. Treffinger tells her he has already hired someone else. New County Agent Harvey Schmidlapp (David Ketchum) pays a visit to Oliver and insults his farm and crops. Turns out Harvey's rude and insulting to all the farmers in the valley. Everyone wants Hank back. Oliver brings a petition to Treffinger demanding Hank is hired back, but Treffinger turns him down. Oliver schemes to scare Harvey away by fixing him up with Ralph. Ralph flirts with Harvey and he winds up quitting. Sam tells Oliver that Hank's been in a bar in Pixley since he was fired. Oliver and Lisa find that Hank is actually the bartender. Hank does not want his old job back because he would then earn enough money to get married. Oliver finds a way for him to come back.
60	28	"The Vulgar Ring Story"	Richard L. Bare	Jay Sommers & Dick Chevillat	April 12, 1967	58
Lisa loses her ring and thinks it went down the kitchen drain. Oliver finds other things in the drain, but not the ring. Eb finds it in the refrigerator. She says the ring belonged to her great, great grandmother, Lastvogel Groinietz (Eva Gabor), the Queen of the Gypsies. Lisa says that the women in her family had to marry American men every fourth generation. Otherwise, they would lose custody of the ring. The story goes that her great, great grandfather Cornelius Reinholt (Eddie Albert) was an American artist touring Hungary. He meets Lastvogel in the woods. As Lisa is telling the story, townspeople show up to listen. Cornelius asks Lastvogel's father, Bela (Oscar Beregi), if he could paint her portrait. While Cornelius tries to paint, the gypsies keep stealing his stuff. Cornelius unknowingly does a wedding dance with Lastvogel. To become one of the tribe, Cornelius must steal a chicken. Cornelius winds up in jail. His Mother (Doris Packer) and Father (Walter Woolf King) come to visit him. Cornelius tells them he is going to marry Lastvogel. His Mother is against the idea. The two get married with the ring that Lastvogel stole from Cornelius's Mother. That is the ring that gets passed down.
61	29	"Who's Lisa?"	Richard L. Bare	Jay Sommers & Dick Chevillat	April 19, 1967	61
Lisa tells Oliver that the TV is broken. He suggests she find something else to do. Lisa wants to go to New York for the opening of opera season. Oliver says he cannot go because it is the busiest time of the year for him. While fixing the roof, Oliver accidentally drops a hammer on Lisa's head, giving her amnesia. Doctor Stuart (Arthur Peterson) tells Oliver the amnesia will pass. Meanwhile, Lisa thinks Oliver is Claude the butler. When Oliver starts to get undressed to go to bed, Lisa starts screaming. Hank comes by and at first thinks Oliver has amnesia. Oddly, Lisa recognizes Hank. And Lisa can now actually cook a decent meal. Doc Stuart tells Oliver that Lisa might start remembering who he is if he starts to court her. Oliver goes to Sam's store and learns the men were betting on what he hit Lisa in the head with. Oliver brings Lisa some flowers and candy, but she still does not recognize him. Oliver starts to think she is faking just so he will take her to the opera. Doc Stuart suggests Oliver actually take Lisa to the opera. Lisa falls out of the opera box and bumps her head Doctor Fillmore (Stanley Farrar) looks at her and now she remembers Oliver. But then Oliver bumps his head and gets amnesia. Phil Gordon as Announcer.
62	30	"Music to Milk By"	Richard L. Bare	Elroy Schwartz	April 26, 1967	63
Eb wants a transistor radio for his birthday. Eb tells Sam that he left hints around the house for Oliver. Oliver thinks it is Lisa's birthday. He goes to Sam's where he is talked into buying the radio. Oliver gives the gift to Lisa and then finds out it is Eb's birthday. Oliver realizes he was tricked into buying the radio. Eb becomes obsessed with winning a name the song contest on a Pixley radio station. He has to listen around the clock to hear the 12 songs. All the songs sound the same to Oliver. A complication arises when Eleanor the cow swallows the radio. That night, Eleanor and Eb prevent Oliver from sleeping because Eb is listening to the radio right by the phone. He has 9 right answers so far. Eb wants to be close to the phone when they play the next record. The next morning, Hank comes by and hears the radio in Eleanor. A confusing conversation ensues. Oliver and Lisa take Eleanor to Dr. Wilson (Charles P. Thompson), the veterinarian. Dr. Wilson says she will be alright and he will give her a shot. Eb has Hank drive him to Dr. Wilson so he can listen for the next contest record. They play song number 11 and Eb calls it in. Dr. Wilson gives Eleanor the shot. They bring the cow home. Just as the last song is to be played, Eleanor hiccups and changes the station, causing Eb to lose.

=== Season 3 (1967–68) ===
No. overall	No. in season	Title	Directed by	Written by	Original release date	Prod. code
63	1	"The Man For the Job"	Richard L. Bare	Jay Sommers & Dick Chevillat	September 6, 1967	64
Sam mentions that Brad Collins, the State Senator that represents Hooterville, is retiring. Sam has to go to the state capitol because he is on the party nominating committee. At the meeting, Grover Simpson (Guy Raymond) says they should nominate a man that can read and write. Dooly Watkins (J. Pat O'Malley) suggests a college man. Sam mentions Oliver Wendell Douglas. Sam flashes back to when he first met Oliver and the men learn that he bought the Haney farm. Grover and Dooly come to Hooterville to meet Oliver. Oliver tells them how he always wanted to be a farmer. They tell him they are thinking of nominating him for State Senator. Flashback to when Oliver grew corn in New York. Oliver has Dr. Faber (Vinton Hayworth archive footage) look at his corn because it had bugs on it. Grover and Dooly speak with Fred to see if he would vote for Oliver. Flashback to when Oliver joined the volunteer fireman band. Grover and Dooly go to see Haney. Haney will not tell them anything unless they pay him, which they do not. They speak to Ralph. Flashback to when Alf and Ralph have a ribbon cutting ceremony for Oliver's bedroom. Grover and Dooly speak to more people in the valley. Turns out the Senator is not going to retire. Sam Edwards as Wally Dunbar.
64	2	"Lisa's Jam Session"	Richard L. Bare	Jay Sommers & Dick Chevillat	September 13, 1967	66
Lisa made toast by putting the toaster in the oven. Oliver asks for some jam and Lisa says they are out of it. Sam's store does not sell jam since all the women in Hooterville make their own. Oliver thinks it is a great idea for Lisa to make her own jam. Oliver gives a speech about the Pilgrims making jam. Lisa does not want to do it. Oliver is trying to teach Eb how to play Chess. Lisa wants to pawn her jewelry so she has money to leave. The subject of jam comes up again and her and Oliver wind up having a fight. Lisa finally agrees to make the jam because of the Hungarian Parliament's "Big Dumb Law of 1924". The law says that "All Hungarian women had to do whatever their husbands wanted them to do, no matter how dumb it was". Hank comes by and he and Oliver have a confusing conversation. Hank gives Lisa a pamphlet on making peach jam. Oliver is going to Sam's to buy some more jam jars, when Haney comes by. Oliver winds up buying the jars from Haney. He then finds Lisa trying to crush the peaches with her feet. Things continue to not go well, so Oliver tells Lisa to get Mrs. Ziffel's help as her jam is the best in the valley. Lisa shows Oliver several jars of jam she made. Oliver is impressed, until he learns Mrs. Ziffel's secret, which is they are store bought jams.
65	3	"Love Comes to Arnold Ziffel"	Richard L. Bare	Jay Sommers & Dick Chevillat	September 20, 1967	65
Oliver learns from Lisa that Arnold the pig is in love with Cynthia the basset hound and Cynthia loves him. Lisa says that Fred objects to Arnold's love affair because the dog belongs to Haney. Cynthia is outside the Ziffel house howling for Arnold. Fred asks Oliver if there is anything he can do legally stop Cynthia from coming around. Fred refuses to go and talk to Haney. Oliver says that Arnold will probably forget about Cynthia soon enough. Oliver comes to Sam's store and meets Cynthia. Haney thinks Cynthia is in love with a dog named Grover. Sam reminds Haney that there is a $2 entry fee for the County Field Trials for dogs. Sam tells Oliver that Haney does not know about Cynthia and Arnold. Hank then brings his dog Quincy to enter him in the Field Trials. Lisa wants to let Arnold stay at their house in hopes that he will forget about Cynthia. Lisa wants to know what a woman's red hair is doing on Oliver's jacket. He tries to explain that it was Quincy's hair. During the night Cynthia finds Arnold at the Douglas home and starts howling. Oliver lets Arnold out to see Cynthia. The next morning, Arnold realizes it could never work between the two of them, so he breaks up with Cynthia. Despite being the favorite to win the County Field Trials, Cynthia performs miserably. Haney now wants to sue over his heartbroken hound. Haney says she has been barred from every kennel club because she now talks like a pig.
66	4	"Oliver vs. the Phone Company"	Richard L. Bare	Jay Sommers & Dick Chevillat	September 27, 1967	67
Oliver's tractor has fallen apart once again. Oliver tries to place a call to the company that built his tractor with no luck. He then complains to Sam and Newt. Fed up with the lousy service, Oliver starts a feud with Hooterville Phone Company president, Roy Trendell (Robert Foulk). Oliver circulates a petition to have changes made at the company. Haney signs the petition only after Oliver buys a wooden Indian. Oliver is getting ready to leave for the state capitol. Lisa wants to go with, but Oliver tells her he will not be there that long. Oliver learns that he will be paying more than he thought for the Indian he got from Haney. At the Capitol, Oliver speaks with Carl Bevins (Hal Smith). He confusingly describes all the problems at the phone company. Carl says that he cannot help as Hooterville needs at least forty two customers and they only have thirty four. In retaliation for Oliver going to the capitol, Roy takes Oliver's phone and gives it to Fred Ziffel. Roy takes the phone cord and gives it to Sam. Tired of Oliver's complaining and saying he could run the company better, Roy gives him the keys. Oliver gives a speech to Lisa about how he will learn to run the phone company.
67	5	"Oliver Takes Over the Phone Company"	Richard L. Bare	Jay Sommers & Dick Chevillat	October 4, 1967	68
Arnold the Pig is watching the news on TV. The Announcer (Jonathan Hole) is talking about how Roy Trendell officially turned over the keys of the Hooterville Phone Company to Oliver. Oliver promises better service. Roy's mother Sarah, who runs the switchboard, quits. She is telling everyone that Oliver got Roy drunk and then stole the phone company in a rigged card game. Oliver and Lisa go to the phone company office and find it in disarray. Oliver sticks his hand in the Petty Cash file cabinet and gets his hand caught in a mouse trap. Hank comes by and wants to use the phone as his is not working. There is some confusion when Oliver tries to place Hank's call. After trying for some time to work the switchboard, it explodes. Mr. McGurney (Dave Willock) comes by to fix the switchboard. Oliver is trying to go over Roy's records and Lisa keeps flirting with him. McGurney thinks he fixed the switchboard, but as he is a part time electrician, he is not sure. Oliver then tries to find a telephone operator. Haney comes by wanting $40,000 from Oliver because Haney could not call his broker and he lost out on a stock deal. Oliver regrets that he took over the company. Lisa figures out how to run the switchboard.
68	6	"Don't Count Your Tomatoes Before They're Picked"	Richard L. Bare	Jay Sommers & Dick Chevillat	October 11, 1967	69
Eb is at the phone company running the switchboard. Hank comes by Oliver's farm and they have a confusing conversation about whether it is time to pick Oliver's tomatoes. Hank also tells Oliver that people are not satisfied with his phone company. Eb comes by and tells Oliver that he is quitting working the switchboard. Lisa makes Oliver hot water soup. Hank sends over Harold Who-The (Guy Raymond) and several other pickers. Oliver tries to explain that Hank made a mistake and he does not need the pickers yet. Oliver does learn that Carmelita (June Foray), one of the pickers, knows how to run a switchboard. Despite her English not being so good, she gets the job. But it is not long before she quits. Tired of the headaches, Oliver wants to sell the phone company. Oliver wants Sam to put an ad in the local paper. Haney comes by and after some dickering, he agrees to take over the company. Haney's outrageous prices lead the people of Hooterville to force Haney to give control back to a reluctant Oliver.
69	7	"A Kind Word For the President"	Richard L. Bare	Jay Sommers & Dick Chevillat	October 18, 1967	70
It is early in the morning and Oliver's phone is ringing. It is Sarah Trendell (Merie Earle), the switchboard operator. She is trying to connect to other people but keeps getting Oliver's phone. Something is not right with the switchboard and Oliver wants Sarah to ring her son, Roy Trendell. Oliver learns there is not really a repair department for the company. Oliver is becoming frustrated with running the phone company. He is tired of the complaints and no one paying their bill. Alf and Ralph come by. Oliver is upset because they have not been around to work on the bedroom for two months. Oliver had sent a letter to them to pay their phone bill or it will be removed. They brought their phone to him. Oliver says he will forgive their bill if they move his phone from the pole to the house. Oliver does not have time to drive Lisa to Sam's store, so he makes Eb do it. Lisa asks Sam for something easy to make for dinner. He suggests "Dee Dee's Dehydrated Dinners". Just drop a bag into boiling water and out comes a full meal. Lisa tells Sam how unappreciated Oliver feels. Alf and Ralph start to get the phone hooked up, but now there is a large hole in the roof. After going over the phone company's books, Oliver must raise rates to not lose so much money. Sam organizes a special meeting of the chamber of commerce, inviting Eb but not Oliver. Oliver is surprised to learn it was about giving him a $1.35 a plate testimonial dinner. Oliver decides to not raise the phone rates.
70	8	"Eb Elopes"	Richard L. Bare	Jay Sommers & Dick Chevillat	October 25, 1967	72
Oliver wonders why Eb did not wake him up. Oliver goes to Eb's room in the barn. There he finds a note saying that Eb's eloped. Eb will not mention the girl's name as he does not want her father to know. Eb lists all the places they will be going on their honeymoon. He also writes that his cousin Walter (Guy Raymond) will fill in for him while he is gone. Walter arrives and Oliver learns that he used to bartend at the Stankwell Falls Cocktail Lounge. Apparently Walter has no experience working on a farm. Because Oliver is desperate, he talks Walter into working for him. Oliver takes Walter to Sam's store to buy some work clothes. Apparently, Sam had been to the lounge that Walter worked at. Sam is surprised that Eb eloped. Hank comes by and says that he went with Sam to the lounge. Hank gets a laugh at the thought of Oliver teaching Walter how to be a farm hand. Instead of pulling up the weeds, Walter pulls up the corn. There is more destruction to follow and it will cost Oliver a lot of money. Thinking that Oliver is opening a cocktail lounge in his house, Haney tries to sell him bar equipment. Haney even has a cocktail waitress for Oliver. That night a couple comes by because Haney left a Cocktail Lounge sign on Oliver's house.
71	9	"The Thing"	Richard L. Bare	Jay Sommers & Dick Chevillat	November 1, 1967	73
Oliver and Lisa go to Sam's to get their mail. Lisa is surprised that they have not heard from Eb since he left on his honeymoon. Oliver is tired of paying storage for something neither he nor Lisa know what it is. The Monroe brothers fix the hole in the ceiling they put there when they ran the wire for the phone. But now they cut the wire. Oliver calls the storage company and has a confusing conversation with the Switchboard Operator (Nora Denney). He finally has the item shipped to the farm. A giant crate arrives and Lisa figures out how to open it. Inside is a genuine Stavinski birdbath that Lisa had bought three years earlier for Oliver's birthday. But to Oliver it is just a large hideous collection of pipes and faucets. During the night, the wind blowing through the pipes makes a whistling sound. Oliver asks Haney to cart the birdbath away and dump it in a swamp, but Lisa finds out. Hank recognizes the Stavinski because his sister had one of his works that she donated to a museum. Oliver hopes to donate his. Mr. Bennett (George Ives), from the museum, says it is a fake Stavinski. But when Oliver has something else that Bennett wants, he makes a deal to take the Stavinski as well. Lisa's replacement birthday present for Oliver is a full sized model of the Eiffel Tower, made of wire hangers, by the artist LaTouche.
72	10	"Das Lumpen"	Richard L. Bare	Jay Sommers & Dick Chevillat	November 8, 1967	74
While at Sam's store, Oliver and Lisa receive a post card from honeymooning Eb. Lisa tells Sam another version of how she and Oliver met during World War II. As a member of the Hungarian underground, she saved him from Nazis by hiding him in a barn. While in the barn, Oliver tells Lisa his dream of being a farmer. When a Nazi showed up, Lisa puts Oliver under a pile of hay. To prove to the Nazi that there is nothing there, Lisa pokes the hay with a pitchfork. Sam asks when they met again. Lisa says it was a week after the war ended and they were in Paris. Lisa was playing cello with the Budapest Chamber Trio in a restaurant. She at first did not recognize Oliver. It takes a little while, but Oliver remembers who Lisa is. Back to the present and Hank comes by and makes things a bit confusing. Lisa then tells how Oliver came to ask her father for permission to marry Lisa. Because of his bad credit rating, Lisa's father turns Oliver down. Lisa continues the story by saying Oliver went back to America dejected. There he learns that Lisa and her magic cello are in the States. Oliver hunts her down and fights a Buddy Atkinson (George N. Neise) to win her back. Oliver stops Lisa's story saying that is not how it happened. Oliver tells Sam that Lisa's father changed his mind and they got married. Back at home, Oliver asks Lisa why her father changed his mind. She told her father an elaborate story about how Oliver was actually wealthy. John Alderson as Corporal. Gordon Jump as Mr. Clark. Murray Alper as Bartender. Phil Gordon as Page Boy.
73	11	"Won't You Come Home, Arnold Ziffel?"	Richard L. Bare	Jay Sommers & Dick Chevillat	November 15, 1967	75
While watching TV, Arnold sees an advertisement for free movies and ice cream at the Pixley theater. To be admitted, one just needs to show up in a funny costume. Arnold gets dressed and leaves. The next morning, Lisa has a bad dream and winds up giving Oliver a bloody nose. Lisa dreamt Eb had been kidnapped, but Oliver reminds her that he is on his honeymoon. Lisa tells Oliver she wants to bring Fred Ziffel some hot cakes because Doris is out of town. Oliver learns that Fred does not actually eat the hot cakes, he reshingles his roof with them. Fred says that Arnold is missing and Lisa thinks he has been pig-napped. Back at home, Lisa mends Oliver's socks with a stapler. Oliver tells Fred that he will get some men and search for Arnold. At Sam's store Hank tries to take charge of the search party, but he just makes things more confusing. Oliver informs Fred that they did not find Arnold. Remembering that the TV was on when Arnold went missing, Lisa and Oliver go to the TV station and speak with Mr. Fortney (Jonathan Hole). They find out about the advertisement for the theater and go there. They speak to the Manager and he does remember Arnold. The Manager thinks Arnold was an actual boy in a pig costume and wanted to give him first prize. When they find out that he ate 10 gallons of ice cream, they go to the hospital. Lisa tries to describe Arnold to the Nurse (Shirley Mitchell), but that does not go well. They run into Haney who says he saw Arnold near the slaughter house. Lisa figures out a way to get Arnold home, but it may cost Oliver a bit of money. Ted de Corsia as Mr. Grimes.
74	12	"Jealousy, English Style"	Richard L. Bare	Jay Sommers & Dick Chevillat	November 22, 1967	76
Oliver informs Lisa that he plans to attend a farm symposium without her. Lisa wants to go with, because with Eb gone, she does not want to be alone. Oliver goes to Drucker's store where Arnold the Pig is picking out a lunch box. Sam introduces Oliver to Tony Ashley (Patrick Horgan). He is from England and he has writing a book about America. Tony's doing odd jobs along the way and Oliver agrees to hire him to help around the farm. Lisa set up a fancy table for lunch. Tony is introduce to Lisa's cooking. Lisa tells Oliver that she feels comfortable about him leaving, now that handsome Tony is here. Oliver is reading a farm manual and is not paying attention to Lisa. She tells him to boil some water as she is about to deliver a baby. The next day, Haney comes by wanting to sell Oliver a cradle for the baby. Haney mentions how handsome Tony is, but that Oliver should not worry about anything. Tony asks Oliver why he is growing his crops so small. Hank comes by and has a confusing conversation about where Tony is from. Hank also mentions how good looking Tony is and that he will take good care of Lisa. Lisa suggests to Oliver that he leave a few days early for his trip as she will be in good hands with Tony around. Lisa wonders why Oliver is not jealous. He says that he trusts her but then asks Lisa to go on the trip with him.
75	13	"Haney's New Image"	Richard L. Bare	Bobby Bell and Bill Lee	November 29, 1967	77
Oliver once again is having trouble with his tractor when it completely falls apart. He intends to get his money back from Haney. Oliver gets the usual runaround from Haney. Oliver threathens to sue Haney. Mr. Farley (Hal Riddle), from the State Division of Highways, comes to Oliver's home looking for Haney. Farley has a confusing conversation with Lisa, but he learns where Haney lives. Farley visits Haney. Haney finds out that the Douglas farm is the possible site for an interchange for a proposed new highway. Suddenly, it is a new, honest Haney who gives Oliver back the money for the tractor. Oliver figures he is up to something. Oliver learns from Sam that Haney is also buying back other things he has sold to other people. Haney talks to Lisa about her wanting to go back to New York. Haney offers to buy back Oliver's farm, but Oliver turns him down. Oliver learns from Hank about the possible highway. Because of something Hank said, Oliver starts a rumor that there is oil on his land. Oliver tries to teach Haney a lesson and he makes a deal to split the profits from the oil. The plan partly backfires when Haney taps into a spring water well and wants to sell the water.
76	14	"Alf and Ralph Break Up"	Richard L. Bare	Jay Sommers & Dick Chevillat	December 13, 1967	79
Alf and Ralph claim they are finally going to finish the Douglas' bedroom. Haney tries to over charge Oliver for the materials to do the job, but Oliver does not fall for it. In the middle of the night, Ralph shows up saying she ran away from home. Apparently Ralph and Alf had a big fight. Lisa invites Ralph to stay. There is some confusion as to where Ralph will sleep, but then they pick the couch. Ralph wakes Oliver up with her snoring. Oliver wakes Ralph up and she almost hits him with a hammer. It is not long before she is snoring again. Alf comes by that morning but then refuses to work anywhere that Ralph is living. Oliver tells Lisa that if Ralph is going to stay, she will have to get to work on the bedroom. Oliver visits Sam to see if he knows anyone that could plaster Oliver's bedroom. Hank comes by and adds to the confusion. When Oliver gets home, Lisa has hired Ralph as the maid. Oliver hopes to get Alf and Ralph back together. He asks Alf to apologize to Ralph, but he will not do it. Oliver finds out that Ralph is a great cook. Alf does come by to apologize and Oliver tries to talk him out of it. Alf and Ralph make up and Oliver learns that Lisa is an experienced plasterer.
77	15	"No Trespassing"	Richard L. Bare	Dan Beaumont	December 20, 1967	78
Oliver is showing signs of being overworked and is grouchy. Eunice Douglas calls Oliver and complains he never calls her. Lisa tells Sam about Oliver being overworked while Eb is away. Hank is there and adds some confusing conversation. Sam suggests to Lisa that she take Oliver on a picnic. Lisa forgets to bring any food on the picnic. She does remember champagne, though. When Oliver tells Lisa to cool the champagne in the lake, she pours the bottle into the water. While picking some apples, Oliver runs into Ira Hatch (Percy Helton). Ira tells Oliver he is trespassing on his land. Ira charges Oliver for the apples he picked and the fish he caught. Lisa comes by and asks Oliver who he is talking to. Suddenly Ira is gone. Oliver tells the men at Drucker's store about Ira. They tell him Ira died 20 years ago. Haney says he won the pool for when Oliver would go crazy. Oliver takes the men to the picnic location. There is no apple tree there now. After the men walk away, Oliver sees Ira again. He calls the men back and Ira is gone. Lisa calls Eunice and tells her Oliver has been seeing things. Eunice says she will send Dr. Faber (Vinton Hayworth). Dr. Faber comes by to see Oliver. Farber comes up with a reason for Oliver seeing Ira. When Faber leaves, Oliver sees Ira going with him.
78	16	"Eb Returns"	Richard L. Bare	Jay Sommers & Dick Chevillat	December 27, 1967	80
Eb is due back from his honeymoon this coming Friday. Oliver and Lisa are at Sam's store picking up her wedding present for Eb. It is a silverware set where the individual pieces come in cans and bags of various Dingo brand foods. Several people say they have already seen Eb in the local towns. Oliver thinks it has to be someone else. Meanwhile, Eb begs an old girlfriend, Cynthia Appelby (Maggie Peterson), to pose as his new bride just long enough to meet his "parents". It turns out that he was stood up at the altar and took his honeymoon trip alone. He has been to other towns and asked other girls, but Cynthia is his last hope. Cynthia thinks Eb should just tell the truth. But, she agrees if it will not take long since she has a big date to get ready for. Lisa wants to fix up Eb's room and throw a party. Oliver is concerned about the price. Oliver and Lisa meet Cynthia. Things are very awkward for Cynthia and she does not stay long. When Eb finds out about the party, he asks Cynthia to show up, but she says no. Lisa and Oliver are decorating for the party. Eb finally tells Lisa and Oliver that Gloria Fenton stood him up. It was a school night and her father would not let her go out. Note: Eb Dawson was written out of several shows as having eloped because actor Tom Lester was sick with mononucleosis.
79	17	"Not Guilty"	Richard L. Bare	Jay Sommers & Dick Chevillat	January 3, 1968	71
Eb wants to borrow Oliver's car to go on a date, but Oliver refuses. Oliver tells him to go and buy his own car. Lisa and Oliver are at Sam's store. Sam calls the State Police when he finds $300 is missing from his safe. State Trooper Jack Webster (Bob Hastings) arrives. Jack tries to start an investigation, but is hindered by Lisa's questions and by Hank just being Hank. Three days later, Jack comes by the Douglas house. Lisa gives Jack some more advice on how to catch the criminal. Just then, Eb drives up in a car that he says cost him $300. When Eb sees the policeman, he jokingly mentions Oliver having a still. Eb claims that a person he lent the money to paid him back. But, he cannot remember the man's name. Eb comes up with a story as to how he originally got the money from an Uncle in Australia. Jack arrests Eb. Oliver represents Eb in front of Judge Perkins (John Harmon). Eb mentions Oliver's still. Lisa causes some confusion when the Bailiff (Tom D'Andrea) tries putting Eb in a holding cell. Oliver arranges bail. Haney tries to sell Oliver his dog sniffing service to find the man that gave Eb the money. Oliver finds Sam's money ground up in coffee they had bought from him. Eb says his car was taken back because the money he got from the man was counterfeit. A Treasury Man (Damian O'Flynn) has a warrant to search Oliver's farm because of rumors of a still.
80	18	"Home is Where You Run Away From"	Richard L. Bare	Jay Sommers & Dick Chevillat	January 10, 1968	81
Eb finds a little boy (Gary Dubin) sleeping in the barn. The boy keeps giving Oliver fake names for himself. He claims to be from another planet. The boy says they do not have parents on his planet, they just grow everyone. He continues to give Oliver fake names. Oliver goes to the Sheriff (Russ Bender), who says he will try and find out something about the boy. When Oliver gets home, Eb tells him that the boy ran away. The boy is actually there, Eb and Lisa were just protecting him. Haney tries to sell Oliver some clothes for the boy. Haney has two little kids on his truck to model the clothes. The boy asks Oliver why he moved to the farm. When the Sheriff comes to tell Oliver that no one has reported a missing boy, the boy runs away. The boy winds up at the Ziffel house. He tells them that he is Oliver's son. When Oliver and Lisa show up, he runs away again. He winds up at Sam's store and tells him he is Arnold's brother. Oliver goes to get him and he runs away. The boy is now driving with Hank and says he is Sam's son. The Sheriff stops the car and asks the boy if his name is Gilbert Henshaw. The boy admits that is his name and the Sheriff takes him to his parents. Eb finds several other little boys in the barn. Gilbert told them that if they had to run away, Oliver's farm is the place to go. Merie Earle as Sarah.
81	19	"How to Succeed in Television Without Really Trying"	Richard L. Bare	Jay Sommers & Dick Chevillat	January 24, 1968	83
Lisa wakes up Oliver at 4 in the morning asking for their check book. She had a dream about an investment she needs to make. The next morning, Eb tells them to invest in Hooterville Electronics. Eb says that Dilly Watkins is the president of the company and he is an electronics genius. Eb then mentions that Dilly is ten years old. Oliver wants to go to the farm exhibit in the State Capitol. Eb says that Dilly wants to "electronificate" the local farms. All one would have to do is push a button for things to get done. Oliver goes to pack and Eb tells Lisa that Dilly needs $28 and Lisa agrees to invest. Dilly shows Eb the TV camera he built. While Oliver and Lisa are on their trip, Eb and Dilly electronificate the Douglas farm. After coming home, Oliver gets electrocuted touching the door knob. Oliver wants to call Dilly to have everything removed. He has trouble with his phone that now moves up and down the pole. The inside of Oliver's TV is missing. The barn door is now "moo" activated. Hank comes by and tries to moo the door open. Oliver gets stuck inside the barn and a TV camera is broadcasting him. The Ziffels are watching Oliver on their TV. That night, Oliver is getting dressed for bed. Sam is watching him on TV and Fred comes by to watch. The next day, Mr. Malone (Thomas Browne Henry), from the FCC, comes by with an arrest warrant for Oliver for running an illegal TV station. Haney comes by and tells Oliver how his show rated. Mr. Malone takes away Oliver's TV camera. But then that night, Oliver unknowingly broadcasts over the radio.
82	20	"Arnold Ziffel, Boy Hero"	Richard L. Bare	Jay Sommers & Dick Chevillat	January 31, 1968	84
Oliver and Eb are looking at the apple trees and somehow a monkey gets involved. Oliver needs apple pickers and he has a frustrating conversation with Hank about getting some. Lisa tells Oliver that Arnold has a paper route because he wants to save up money to buy a color TV. Fred and Arnold go to the Pixley bank to open an account for Arnold. While there, the bank is robbed by Barney (Henry Corden) and Clyde. They get a bag of cash and take Arnold's five dollars. Mr. Guerney (Harry Harvey Sr.), of the bank, then calls the Sheriff (Bill Zuckert). The crooks wind up at the Douglas' farm and learn they only got $67 from the bank, plus Arnold's $5. Lisa thinks they are the apple pickers and invites them in. Arnold drops off the newspaper and recognizes the crooks. After Lisa sees that the bank was robbed in the paper, she figures out Barney and Clyde are the crooks. Barney and Clyde take Lisa and Oliver hostage. Arnold tries to tell Fred about the crooks. While Lisa is making hotcakes for the crooks, she manages to get Clyde's gun. But Clyde gets it back. Eb shows up and is also taken hostage. Arnold tries to use Haney's phone, but is chased away. Arnold tries to tell the Sheriff about the crooks, but he sends Arnold away. While the crooks are eating, Arnold runs off with their bag of money and brings it to the Sheriff. The crooks are about to leave with Lisa's ring and Oliver's car. Arnold leads the Sheriff to the Douglas farm and the crooks are then caught.
83	21	"Flight to Nowhere"	Richard L. Bare	Jay Sommers & Dick Chevillat	February 7, 1968	82
Oliver and Lisa attend a town meeting. Mr. Tepple, of the State Agricultural Society, is introduced by Sam. He hopes the farmers will sign up for an agricultural exchange program to France. Oliver says they could learn a lot. Hank shows a movie of Paris from 1918, before Oliver stops him. Oliver says the cost is worth it, so the farmers vote to go. Lisa is making croissants out of hotcake batter. Eb thinks he is going with to Paris, but Oliver wants him to stay home. Lisa and some of the farm wives discuss what they are going to wear on the trip. Haney tries to sell Oliver a suitcase, passport and traveler checks. Mr. Tepple comes back to make up the plane list. The farmer's find out that the $300 cost for tickets is per person, not per plane-load. Oliver says that the cost is worth it, but the other men do not have that much money. Due to a misunderstanding, the men think Oliver can get tickets for $78. Mr. Tepple is upset with Oliver because of the misunderstanding and the flight will have to be canceled. The farmers decide to supply their own airplane and fly themselves over. Since Oliver flew in the war, they draft him to be their pilot. Mr. Carter (John Hubbard), from the FAA, puts a stop to their plans. Somehow the word of the canceled flight gets out and the French Ambassador files a protest. Harvey Wilson (Ed Prentiss) and Charles Clyde (Damian O'Flynn), from the State Department, now have to answer questions from the President. The farmers are sent one way tickets to France. Dennis Fimple as Man.
84	22	"My Mother, the Countess"	Richard L. Bare	Jay Sommers & Dick Chevillat	February 14, 1968	62
Lisa receives a letter from her mother saying that she is coming for a visit. When Lisa refers to her mother as a Countess, Eb goes off to tell everyone. Sam prints up a newspaper stating that a Countess will be visiting Hooterville. Oliver tries to tell the men at Sam's store that Lisa's mother is not royalty. But, the men start talking about a parade and a large celebration. Haney tells Oliver that for a price he can supply everything for a royal person. Ralph and Doris tell Lisa that the Ladies Meeting Group wants to have a luncheon for the Countess. The Chamber of Commence votes to declare the Countess's arrival a legal holiday. The Chamber wants to know when the Countess will arrive, but Oliver is not sure. More and more preparations are underway. Oliver wants to go to New York as he does not want to be around when all the celebrating starts. Eventually, rockets are set off and the band starts playing because they believe the Countess has arrived. Lisa and Oliver show up and say the woman they have greeted is not Lisa's mother. When Lisa and Oliver get home, Eb tells them that the real Countess was there and he sent her into Hooterville. No one can find the Countess. Roy Trendell says that the Countess is in Pixley, but it is actually the woman that was in Hooterville earlier. A week later Lisa receives a letter from her Mother who is now in Switzerland. Jamie Rose as Girl #4.
85	23	"The Spring Festival"	Richard L. Bare	Jay Sommers & Dick Chevillat	February 21, 1968	85
It is the first day of spring in Hooterville. Everyone, except Oliver, is overcome with spring fever. Lisa reminds Oliver how romantic he used to be and the poems he would write her. Ed manages to spoil Oliver's reputation as a poem writer. Lisa and Oliver go to Sam's store and Sam puts on his spring toupee. Oliver tries to order some seed, but Sam is busy telling Lisa about the spring festival the town used to have. Lisa volunteers to organize the festival. Eb frustrates Oliver when they try to plant the seeds Oliver bought. Haney wants Oliver to pay him for driving Lisa around the valley trying to get support for the festival. Meanwhile, Doris is chaperoning Arnold and his girlfriend Sue Ann. Lisa comes by to talk about the festival. Eb drops Oliver's watch instead of a seed. Hank comes by and runs over the watch with his car. Lisa wants Oliver to dress up as the first robin of spring and Hank brought some paint and feathers. Alf and Ralph are building a float for the parade. It is going to be a nest for Oliver to ride in. Oliver says he will not do it. Further plans for the festival are ruined when it rains. Lisa is mad at Oliver because he hoped for rain because of his seeds. They later make up and sleep together in the nest. Note: This is the final episode featuring Barbara Pepper as Doris Ziffel. Fran Ryan would resume the character role in the Season 5, Episode 6 episode, "The Road".
86	24	"Our Son, the Barber"	Richard L. Bare	Dan Beaumont	February 28, 1968	86
Eb wants to borrow $25 from Oliver for a correspondence school, but Oliver says no. Meanwhile, Windy Hinkle (J. Pat O'Malley) comes to Hooterville to cut people's hair. He only comes by every six weeks. Windy sets up in the front of Sam's store. After several other people, Oliver is next. Arnold comes by and Windy says he called ahead and it is Arnold's turn. Oliver will not leave the chair. In the middle of cutting Oliver's hair, Windy is called away for an emergency haircut. Oliver tells Lisa the town should get a permanent barber. Eb decides on a career as a barber. He talks Oliver into paying his tuition to MIT (Middle Indiana Tonsorial), a mail-order barber college. Eb gets a letter from MIT saying he has been accepted. However, Eb needs more money for the barber tool kit, white jacket and shoes. Haney tries to sell Oliver some barber equipment. Eb's sent a dummy named Leroy to practice on, but he did not get the toupee to cut. Hank comes by with the hair piece. Eb receives his grades by mailing the trimmed toupees back to the school. Eb is told that he has graduated with honors but will have to send more money to get his diploma.
87	25	"Oliver's Jaded Past"	Richard L. Bare	Jay Sommers & Dick Chevillat	March 6, 1968	87
Lisa reminds Oliver that he promised her a two week New York vacation if she stayed with him on the farm for two years. And she is able to prove he said it. Oliver does not want to go, but gives in. When they arrive at the hotel, the Manager (George Ives) calls Oliver Mr. Cummings. He then mentions that Lisa must be the new Mrs. Cummings. Oliver and Lisa dine at the El Mirador restaurant. The coat check girl asks Oliver what happened to the cute redhead he used to bring there. Oliver complains about how expensive everything is. The waiter (Louis Quinn) calls Oliver Mr. Cummings. Oliver's chair and drink keep disappearing. The next morning, Oliver cannot remember parts of the evening. Judson Felton (Roland Winters), Oliver's old law partner, calls and wants to meet for lunch. Judson offers Oliver his job back. Old friend Wanda Markham (Shirley Mitchell) shows up. She is surprised playboy Oliver is married. Wanda invites Oliver to a cocktail party and says a lot of his old girlfriends will be there. Lisa is getting a little tired of hearing about all of these other women. Oliver starts to have a good time in New York. Oliver agrees to take Judson's job offer. Lisa now says she does not want to live in New York, because of what it does to Oliver. Lisa wants to go home, because she likes it better there. Victoria Carroll as Susie. Phil Gordon as Man.
88	26	"The Hungarian Curse"	Richard L. Bare	Jay Sommers & Dick Chevillat	March 13, 1968	88
A fellow Hungarian, Lazlo Broslav, comes by the Douglas house. It is revealed that Lazlo once saved the life of Lisa's uncle, and the uncle wants them to repay him. The uncle also says that Oliver will give him a job. Lazlo fixes a few things around the house. Lisa feels an obligation to help Lazlo and invites him to stay a while. Lazlo wants to stay for 4 to 5 months. Oliver is irritated by his constant money-grubbing. Lazlo is charging Eb to teach him Hungarian. Oliver tells Lazlo he has to leave. The Cannonball is not running today, so Lazlo gets to stay one more day. Eb becomes sick and Lazlo says he must have gotten in the way of the Hungarian curse he was putting on Oliver. Hank comes by with a Do-It-Yourself Chicken Soup Kit for Eb's cold. Alf and Ralph are suing Oliver because Lazlo fired them. Lazlo claims he can finish Oliver's bedroom in 3 days. Haney comes by with the 15 men that Lazlo requested to help him. Oliver kicks the men out. Haney tells Oliver that Lazlo ordered material to build a house. Lazlo says he has sent for his wife and children. Oliver tells Lazlo to leave and he puts a curse on Oliver. Everything that Lazlo fixed now falls apart.
89	27	"The Rutabaga Story"	Richard L. Bare	Jay Sommers & Dick Chevillat	March 20, 1968	89
It is planting season, but Oliver does not know what to grow. He wants to find a crop that he can make money with. Lisa is annoying him with talk of going to Monte Carlo. Oliver goes to Sam's store. None of the other farmers can figure out what they will grow. After a confusing conversation, Oliver asks Hank for some reports on past growing seasons. After seeing the reports, Oliver discovers Hooterville is perfect for growing rutabagas. The farmers know rutabagas grow well but they cannot sell them. Oliver wants all the farmers to plant rutabagas and initiate a publicity campaign to promote them. The farmers get rutabaga fever and plan a "Rutabaga Bowl", a parade and queen. Oliver thinks the men are crazy and going too far. The farmers are trying to organize things, but are not having much luck Haney comes up with a plan to send a hot-air balloon up to promote rutabagas. Oliver learns that Lisa will be in the balloon and drop vegetables on people with the message "Eat Hooterville Rutabagas" written on them. Lisa is almost shot down over Denver. Lisa is back home and Oliver tells her how stupid it was to go up in the balloon. A Man from CBS (Clark Howat) comes by with the TV cameras for the Rutabaga Bowl. Foster Brooks as Major.
90	28	"Instant Family"	Richard L. Bare	Jay Sommers & Dick Chevillat	March 27, 1968	90
At Sam's store, Oliver and Lisa meet their new neighbor, Mrs. Mullen (Anne Barton). Mrs. Mullen's husband is in Chicago. Just then, Mrs. Mullen, an expectant mother, goes into labor. Oliver will take her to the hospital. Lisa says she will take care of Molly (Pamelyn Ferdin) and Kenny (Gary Dubin), the children Mrs. Mullen had with her. The Nurse (Shirley Mitchell) thinks Oliver is the husband and a confusing conversation ensues. When Oliver gets back, he finds that Lisa has taken Mrs. Mullen's other four children in as well. He tells the children that their mother had a baby boy. Oliver gets knocked down when the kids run in the house for lunch. Lisa serves them caviar sandwiches. Oliver reluctantly agrees to let Ralph help with the cooking. Ralph uses her construction tools to cook with. Oliver is forced to sleep with the boys on the floor of the living room. Lisa, Ralph and Molly will sleep in the bedroom. The next morning, things get even more annoying when Oliver has to shuttle the kids to and from school at various times because they all go to different schools. Lisa tells Oliver that Mrs. Mullen will be coming home the next morning. That night, Lisa promises to take the kids to a drive in movie. Things do not go well. The next morning, Oliver tells Lisa that Mrs. Mullen is home and waiting for the children. Oliver pretends he will miss the children, but he is actually happy they are leaving. But there is a measles outbreak and the children will be staying longer. Craig Huxley as Eric.
91	29	"A Star Named Arnold is Born, Part 1"	Richard L. Bare	Jay Sommers & Dick Chevillat	April 3, 1968	91
The Hooterville Barn and Repertory Company will present a production of "Who". The marquee was not big enough for "Who Killed Jock Robin?". Oliver and Lisa go to Sam's store to get their tickets. Oliver has a confusing conversation with Sam when he tries to find out the name of the play. The night of the play, Oliver does not want to go but Lisa makes him. Hank is collecting the tickets and comments on Oliver's tuxedo. The play is being held in a barn. Oliver leaves during the first act. The next morning, Lisa is still upset that Oliver left the play. Arnold the pig's performance as a British police dog turns him into an overnight star. Lisa has an old friend named Boris Fedor (Oscar Beregi Jr.) who is a Hollywood producer. They knew each other when they were children in Budapest. Lisa calls Boris and, not knowing that Arnold is a pig, Boris agrees to see him. The Chamber of Commerce holds a meeting about Arnold. Oliver thinks it would be a waste to send Arnold to Hollywood. After a few suggestions, they decide to stage a telethon to raise money for the trip. Four days into the telethon and they have only raised 9 dollars. Lisa winds up donating enough money for Arnold to go. Now Lisa has to talk Oliver into taking Arnold to Hollywood. Patience Cleveland as Miss Hanson. Trudi Ames as High school Girl. Note: In 1997, TV Guide ranked this episode (along with part two) #59 on its list of the 100 Greatest Episodes.
92	30	"A Star Named Arnold is Born, Part 2"	Richard L. Bare	Jay Sommers & Dick Chevillat	April 10, 1968	92
Oliver and Lisa are to take Arnold to Hollywood to meet producer Boris Fedor. Oliver does not bother to pack. He still believes that once Boris sees Arnold is a pig, they will be on the next flight home. When they arrive at the hotel in Hollywood, the Clerk (Jonathan Hole) says they cannot give a pig a room. Arnold starts making a fuss. To keep him quiet, the Clerk agrees to let Arnold stay with Oliver and Lisa. Meanwhile, Boris has a horse actor that is causing him problems as the horse wants more money. Lisa calls Boris, but still does not mention Arnold is a pig. After meeting him, Boris is not interested in Arnold, but tells Lisa he will get back to her. Boris' assistant, Ted Sweitzer (Peter Leeds), comes up with a plan to use the pig to pressure the greedy horse to come back to work. Arnold is prepped for his screen test. It has been three days and Lisa has not heard from Boris. Oliver wants to go home. Sweitzer tells Boris that Arnold's screen test went very well, but Boris is not interested. When the horse's agent still wants more money, the publicity machine starts promoting Arnold as the studio's next big star. Oliver and Lisa are packed and ready to leave, when Lisa gets a call from Boris. The horse has a talk with Arnold and Arnold feels sorry for the horse. Arnold gets himself fired so the horse can get the part back. Phil Gordon as Assistant Director. Note: In 1997, TV Guide ranked this episode (along with part one) #59 on its list of the 100 Greatest Episodes.

=== Season 4 (1968–69) ===
No. overall	No. in season	Title	Directed by	Written by	Original release date	Prod. code
93	1	"Guess Who's Not Going to the Luau?"	Richard L. Bare	Jay Sommers & Dick Chevillat	September 25, 1968	93
Eb tells Oliver and Lisa that Peterson's Poi Juice is giving away a trip to Hawaii. Sam tells Fred that he does not have any entry blanks for the contest. Oliver and Lisa show up to get some entry blanks as well. Sam then finds the blanks in a box. Haney tries to sell some Hawaiian items to Oliver with an elaborate contract. Two weeks later the winner of the contest is to be announced on TV. Hank comes by to the Douglas house but cannot remember why. Mr. Peterson (Parley Baer), the president of the company, announces that Arnold Ziffel has won. Mr. Robertson, from an advertising agency, shows up at the Douglas house. He has come to see Arnold, but is lost. Oliver and Lisa bring Mr. Robertson to the Ziffel house. When Robertson discovers Arnold's a pig, he tries to disqualify him. Fred hires Oliver as Arnold's "pig lawyer". Robertson thinks he found a loophole when he says that each contestant had to sign their entry. Arnold then shows Robertson how he can sign his name. Arnold wins the trip. When Arnold finds out that the meal at the Luau in Hawaii will be roast pig, he decides not to go. Hank Worden as Farmer.
94	2	"The Rummage Sale"	Richard L. Bare	Jay Sommers & Dick Chevillat	October 2, 1968	94
Hank hangs a sign for a local rummage sale on Oliver's door. Lisa is glad to give away Oliver's entire wardrobe, but cannot part with any of her dresses. Each of Lisa's dresses has a memory attached. One dress leads to a flashback of Oliver asking Lisa's father for her hand in marriage. Her father slams the door in Olivers face, so the couple decide to elope. Back to the present, Haney comes by to pick up the old clothes, but Oliver has nothing for him yet. Haney offers to sell Oliver some clothes to donate. A sweater leads to a flashback of their honeymoon in Switzerland. Oliver broke his leg falling off a ski lift. Count Freidmeister (John van Dreelen) comes by. He flirts with Lisa and makes Oliver jealous. Back to the present, Lisa tells Oliver to pick a dress and she will donate it. But he picks the dress she wore at their first party in their new Park Avenue apartment. Flashback to Foster (Ronald Long) the butler arriving to help. Possible clients, Mr. Wilson (Charles Lane) and his wife arrive. Mrs. Wilson is wearing the same "one of a kind" dress that Lisa is. Other guests arrive. The party does not go as planned and the Wilson's leave. Back to the present, Oliver decides to buy some clothes from Haney to donate. Tom D'Andrea as Plumber. Phil Gordon as Guest.
95	3	"Hail to the Fire Chief"	Richard L. Bare	Jay Sommers & Dick Chevillat	October 16, 1968	96
Fire Chief Joe Carson mentions to Sam about the Annual Convention of Fire Chiefs in Miami, Florida. Joe does not have the money to go and hopes that some of the locals will chip in. Sam tells Joe to not count on that happening. Joe appoints Oliver deputy fire chief, assuming he will pay for Joe's trip. Oliver tells Joe he will only chip in $5. Oliver says that the Hooterville Fire Department needs a lot of help. Sam sets up a meeting to pick a new fire chief. When Oliver gets home, Lisa had invited Arnold over for tea. Oliver insults Arnold and he leaves. During the next meeting, Haney keeps trying to sell stuff. When it seems he volunteered, which he did not, Oliver is made the fire chief. Hank tells Lisa that people think Oliver stabbed Joe in the back and took his job. Lisa is mad because she thinks Oliver will go to the convention to look at the girls on the beach. Oliver does not want the job. Because of something Eb says, Oliver thinks he has a way to get fired. Oliver goes around the valley fining everyone for fire code violations. Sam holds another meeting. They fire Oliver and Joe gets his job back. Special Guest from Petticoat Junction: Edgar Buchanan as Uncle Joe Carson
96	4	"Eb's Romance"	Richard L. Bare	Jay Sommers & Dick Chevillat	October 23, 1968	95
Eb is picking out an engagement ring for Loreli Appleby (Melody Patterson) at Claxon's (William Keene) Jewelry Store. He needs Oliver to co-sign for the ring. Meanwhile, Oliver is furious because Eb was not around and he had to do all of Eb's work. Eb tells Oliver and Lisa that he met Loreli the day before. Oliver does sign the form. Haney tells Oliver that he will not be coming by anymore because Oliver did not buy the ring from him. Then Haney offers his catering service for the wedding, which Oliver declines. Eb is worried about asking Mr. Appleby (John Qualen) for permission to marry Loreli. He asks Oliver to do it instead, but Oliver tells him to do the best he can. To make a good impression, Eb borrows Oliver's car to visit Mr. Appleby. Eb tells Mr. Appleby how wealthy his parents are. Eb tries to fix Mr. Appleby's truck so he can take his cabbage crop to market. It does not go well, so Eb lends Oliver's car to Mr. Appleby. Oliver is not happy about his car being lent out. Because Eb forgot to put gas in the car, Mr. Appleby could not get his crop to town and it goes bad. Mr. Appleby is now worried about having enough money to make his mortgage payment. Mr. Appleby will consider letting Eb marry Loreli if he can come up with $180. Eb pawns Oliver's cow Eleanor to get the money. Mr. Appleby will take six months to give Eb his answer. Haney comes by that night to again try to sell his catering service to Oliver.
97	5	"The Candidate"	Richard L. Bare	Dan Beaumont	October 30, 1968	97
Oliver gets three flat tires from pot holes in the road. He goes to Sam's store to get some tire patches. There, Oliver meets Hooterville's State District Representative, Ben Hanks (J. Pat O'Malley), who is up for re-election. Oliver is not impressed with Hanks. Meanwhile, Lisa's dishwasher has been running for days and has shrunk all the dishes. Eb and Oliver go to a rally for Ben and everyone there is supporting their beloved representative. It does not hurt that Hanks supplied all the food at the rally. When Oliver does not get an answer to his pot hole question, he decides to run against Ben. Oliver runs into problems getting support from the locals because Ben bribes them with expensive gifts. Ben even has a catalog for them to choose their "gifts" from. Oliver learns from Fred Ziffel that Ben is padding the state payroll with relatives. Oliver has the story put in the paper. At the next rally, Oliver asks Ben about the relatives. Things do not go well for Oliver. Skip Young as Campaign Worker.
98	6	"Handy Lessons"	Richard L. Bare	Jay Sommers & Dick Chevillat	November 6, 1968	98
Oliver is working on his tractor and Lisa starts yelling that she needs him in the house. He races in and Lisa says that the light bulb in the refrigerator is burned out. Oliver has to show Lisa how to change the bulb and then how to put a nail in the wall. Lisa puts a large hole in the wall trying to hit the nail. As she has been living on the farm for three years, Oliver would like Lisa to learn how to do things around the house. Lisa asks Hank for some information to help her be more handy. Ralph comes by and Hank tries to hide because she wants to marry him. Ralph agrees to teach Lisa and not tell Oliver as Lisa wants it to be a surprise. Lisa leaves a note at home telling Oliver she will not be home for dinner. Eb is supposed to cook. Oliver wonders where Lisa is. Ralph shows Lisa some tools and how to use them. It is getting late and Oliver starts to worry. While trying to learn, Lisa winds up destroying the Monroe's workshop. Lisa comes home very late and then leaves very early the next morning. Lisa goes out on a job at Mr. Harrison's house with the Monroe's, but things do not go well. Oliver finds out where Lisa is and goes to the job site. A misunderstanding leads to Oliver getting punched in the nose by Mr. Harrison. Back at home, Lisa shows Oliver how she can put a nail in the wall and she knocks the whole wall down.
99	7	"A Husband For Eleanor"	Richard L. Bare	Jay Sommers & Dick Chevillat	November 13, 1968	99
Eb and Oliver notice that Eleanor the cow has not been eating much lately, nor giving a lot of milk. Lisa blows out the drain line while she tries to get an orange out of the sink's pipe. Oliver has no luck reaching a veterinarian. Lisa wants Eleanor to sleep in the bedroom. Hank comes by, and after a bit of confusion, he tells Oliver that Eleanor needs to have a calf. After speaking with Sam, Oliver learns that Otis Cowan (Dave Willock) has a bull. Lisa wants to know about the bull and if Sam can perform a cow and bull wedding ceremony. Oliver and Lisa bring Eleanor to Cowan's farm. Lisa asks Otis if Dudley the bull can support a family. After many more questions, an irritated Otis takes Dudley away. Lisa suggests that Eleanor join a lonely hearts club. Haney brings a mangy looking bull named Olé Sanchez to the Douglas farm. Eleanor seems to like Haney's bull, but Oliver sends Haney away when Haney wants $300. Oliver tells Lisa that cows do not have romances. He tells Lisa he is bringing Eleanor back to Otis. The next day, Eb finds Eleanor missing. Lisa is sad because a brokenhearted Eleanor ran away from home. Haney comes by and says his bull is missing. Lisa says they eloped.
100	8	"Old Mail Day"	Richard L. Bare	Jay Sommers & Dick Chevillat	November 20, 1968	100
Lisa dry cleans Oliver's suit by putting it in the washing machine with no water and just soap. Eb tells Oliver and Lisa that it is "Old Mail Day". That is when Sam hands out letters that have gotten misplaced in his post office. At Sam's store, Haney tries to charge Oliver for parking. Sam starts handing out letters. Fred gets a letter dated 1917 that says he has been drafted. Arnold gets a fingerprint set he ordered. Oliver receives two one year old letters from his stock broker. Because he never responded, Oliver lost $300. Sam explains that his Post Office is not classified for delivering the mail. Oliver says that he will write to the Postmaster General for delivery service. There is a lot of confusion when Oliver tries to find his portable typewriter. Oliver gives the letter to Sam. Sam reminds Oliver about his previous complaining letter fiascoes. Three weeks later, Sam tells Oliver that his Post Office is now classified for delivering mail. Sam is upset because he will have to deliver the mail by bicycle. Oliver is upset because for 5 days Sam has found an excuse to not deliver Oliver's mail. Oliver goes to Sam's store and finds the locals upset because the store is never open anymore. Oliver writes the Postmaster General again. This backfires when a technicality causes Sam's Post Office to be closed and everyone has to go to Pixley to get their mail.
101	9	"The Agricultural Student"	Richard L. Bare	Jay Sommers & Dick Chevillat	November 27, 1968	101
Hank comes by to give Oliver his soil analysis letter. But the letter actually is for Hank. The Agricultural Department is sending Terry Harper, a student, to learn the ropes from agent Hank. Hank thinks he is going to be fired. Believing Terry to be a man, Lisa suggests he room with Eb. Eb wants to check this Terry out first. At the train station, Hank mistakes a young man (Rick Lenz) for Terry, but the man says he is not Terry. Hank finally meets Terry (Francine York), who turns out to be an attractive blonde. Hank brings her to the Douglas farm and Eb is thrilled at the idea of rooming with Terry. Terry tells Oliver that she has always been interested in farming. Meanwhile, Ralph is upset that Hank breaks a date with her to go to the dance on Saturday. After meeting Terry, all the men of Hooterville, eligible or not, fall over themselves flirting and fawning. Terry meets Arnold and makes him blush. Oliver explains to Terry that several of the men think they have a date with her for the dance. The night of the dance, the Douglas living room is packed full of the men all waiting for Terry. Terry says that she was not planning on going to the dance. But because the men are all here, she suggests they all go together. The men are against that idea and want her to pick someone. They are all surprised and disappointed when Terry says she going to the dance with Arnold the pig.
102	10	"How Hooterville was Floundered"	Richard L. Bare	Jay Sommers & Dick Chevillat	December 11, 1968	102
The Hooterville centennial celebration is this Saturday. Oliver is looking for his guitar case. Eb tells Oliver he put it in the car. Oliver rehearses with the Volunteer Fireman Band and Joe tells of the plans for the celebration. Oliver tries to sing a song written about town founder Horace Hooter. He does not like it and refuses to sing it at the celebration. After everyone complains about Joe's plans, he quits. Oliver is put in charge and he tries to think of a way to celebrate. Because of something Lisa says, Oliver comes up with an idea and holds a meeting. He suggests staging a re-enactment of the town's founding starring himself and Lisa as Horace and Doris Hooter. In the play, saloon girl Doris causes the money that Horace was going to buy a farm with to being taken away. Doris wants to get married, but Horace says not until he gets the money to buy a farm. Horace briefly takes a job laying railroad track. Thanks to her skills as a card shark, Doris gets Horace's money back. Horace and Doris get married. After speaking with Larry and Harry Monroe and storekeeper Ben Drucker, they decide to call their community Hooterville. Back to reality, the members of the meeting are not sure about the play. Oliver learns that the centennial is actually a year from Saturday. Special Guest from Petticoat Junction: Edgar Buchanan as Uncle Joe Carson
103	11	"The Blue Feather"	Richard L. Bare	Jay Sommers & Dick Chevillat	December 18, 1968	103
Lisa tells Oliver that it is Tuesday the 12th, which is bad luck in Hungary. She says that if Oliver wears his hat on side ways, that will keep away the bad luck. Lisa receives a blue feather in the mail. She explains to Oliver that Hungarian gypsies have placed a curse on her and something terrible is going to happen to her. Lisa says she knows because she was a gypsy once. Haney comes by and charges Lisa $8 to sprinkle her with his Grandma Haney's "de-hexifying powder". He says it only lasts a half-hour, but the 24-hour treatment is available for $236. When Haney finds out that it is a Gypsy blue feather curse, he comes up with another cure. Oliver asks Haney if he sent the feather just to drum up some business. Haney tries to sell them a couple bird like statues, but Oliver just walks away. Haney sells Lisa a ridiculous recipe that she mixes up. She is to put the concoction in a green purse and hang it outside the front door. Eb sees the purse and panics. He tells Sam and Hank that the "green purse hex" will bring 45 days of drought. Sam does not believe in the hex. Eb counteracts it with his own concoction in a red purse. Oliver and Lisa see the red purse and Lisa thinks the Gypsies did it. With the help of two hippies, who were looking for a hand out, Oliver finds a way to convince Lisa the curse is off. The hippies also hear a radio commercial that explains the blue feather in the mail.
104	12	"How to Get from Hooterville to Pixley Without Moving"	Richard L. Bare	Jay Sommers & Dick Chevillat	December 25, 1968	106
Lisa is dreaming about a man named Harvey. When she wakes up, she cannot remember Oliver's name. Oliver is upset that the Monroe brothers have been working on his bedroom for a year and it is still not finished. Oliver tells them he will sue them if the work is not finished soon. Alf and Ralph confess that they never got a building permit. Oliver and Lisa go to get the permit. At first the Clerk (Jonathan Hole) thinks they are there for a marriage license. Oliver explains that he wants a building permit. They learn from the Clerk that their barn is in Hooterville, but their house is in Pixley. Alf and Ralph tell Oliver that their union local will not let them work in Pixley. Mr. Clement from the Pixley Hospitality Committee comes by and tells Oliver he owes three years worth of taxes. The Hooterville Phone company takes away Oliver's phone. Sam tells Oliver that his mail has been forwarded to the Pixley Post Office. Sam also says that he has to charge them a Non Resident Working Tax because Oliver's farm is in Hooterville. When they get home, they find all their furniture moved out of the house. Eb tells them that a man from the Pixley Building Authority has condemned their house. Hooterville disconnected all their utilities. Haney offers to hook a rope to the house and pull it to Hooterville. Oliver has the farm re-surveyed. The Surveyor (Gordon Jump) tells Oliver that his house is actually in Hooterville. But the barn is in Pixley and the farm is in Crabwell Corners.
105	13	"The Birthday Gift"	Richard L. Bare	Jay Sommers & Dick Chevillat	January 1, 1969	104
Lisa's birthday is coming up and Oliver suggests getting her a cook book. She instead, gives him a long list of expensive things she wants. When Lisa mentions that she misses horse back riding, Oliver decides to get her a horse. Haney comes by and tries to sell Oliver various things to give Lisa, but Oliver is not interested. Oliver is surprised when several different women's hands pop out of the safe Haney has on his truck. Oliver does let it slip that he is buying a horse for Lisa. Oliver asks Hank if he knows anyone selling a horse. They have the usual confusing conversation. Meanwhile, Haney brings a horse to Lisa, a talking horse named Mr. Fred (Rich Little voice). Haney keeps trying to stop Mr. Fred from talking in front of Lisa. Oliver does not want to buy anything from Haney, so he hopes to stop payment on the check Lisa gave him. Oliver tries to call the bank, but Sarah (Merie Earle) is having trouble with the party line switchboard. Mother Eunice Douglas (Eleanor Audley) calls from Paris to remind Oliver about Lisa's birthday. There is more confusion with the party line. A misunderstanding leads the people on the line to believe Lisa has a drinking problem. Something Hank sees does not help. Sam and Ralph come to talk to Lisa. Oliver discovers that the horse can talk. When Oliver mentions that the horse talked to him, Sam and Ralph leave. They figure that Lisa drinks because she has a husband that thinks horses can talk. Ketty Lester as Operator.
106	14	"Everywhere a Chick Chick"	Richard L. Bare	Jay Sommers & Dick Chevillat	January 8, 1969	105
Eb shows Oliver and Lisa two chicks that have hatched. Lisa starts to treat them as children. Oliver is considering raising chickens. Eb says it will just be another of Oliver's projects that goes badly. Hank is to bring over some pamphlets on the subject. But in usual Hank fashion, that is not as easy as it should be. Lisa tells Oliver what happened on the soap opera she watches. Oliver gives the Monroe brothers a week to build a chicken coop in the barn. Oliver goes to Sam's to order 1000 chicks and a brooder house. But a tearful Sam has to tell Lisa what happened on their favorite soap opera first. Haney tries to sell Oliver a ridiculous broken down egg laying inducing machine. Alf and Ralph show Oliver the chicken coop and it is a mess. Plus, they have put Eleanor the cow up in Eb's room. The chicks arrive and Lisa starts to give them all names. Oliver tells Eb to keep an eye on the brooder house temperature. A problem arises when the brooder stops working. Lisa puts the chicks in her and Oliver's bed under an electric blanket. Oliver and Lisa go to see Sam about replacing the brooder. When Sam says it will take a week, Oliver may have come up with a solution and it involves the soap opera.
107	15	"The Marital Vacation"	Richard L. Bare	Jay Sommers & Dick Chevillat	January 15, 1969	107
Lisa points out that her and Oliver having been fighting a lot lately. She suggests they take a vacation from each other and Oliver agrees. Oliver tells Lisa to go to New York for a while. Eb is sad that Lisa is leaving. He thinks Oliver is kicking her out. At the train, Lisa tells Oliver that if he gets lonely, he should call her. Hank comes by and Oliver tries to explain why Lisa is leaving. Because of what Eb spreads around, everyone thinks Oliver kicked Lisa out. Lisa is not even on the plane when she calls Oliver at Sam's store and asks if he misses her. Eb wants to go with Oliver to the Pixley diner, but Oliver wants to be alone. In New York, Lisa is sad that Oliver has not called her yet. Lisa calls Oliver constantly and is driving him crazy. Haney comes by and wants Oliver to subscribe to the Haney's Lonesome Service. Haney winds up throwing away Oliver's 40 year old bottle of Scotch. Right after Haney leaves, Fred and Arnold come by for a visit. So Oliver will not be lonely, Arnold will stay with him until Lisa gets back. When Arnold winds up in Oliver's bed, Oliver chases Arnold out. Lisa decides to come home just as Oliver flies out to New York. They both keep flying back and forth, missing each other. Lisa winds up in Miami and Oliver says he will meet her there. Oliver winds up in Cuba. Ronald Long as Charles the Waiter. Damian O'Flynn as Desk Clerk.
108	16	"A Prize in Every Package"	Richard L. Bare	Jay Sommers & Dick Chevillat	January 22, 1969	108
Two crooks named Mack (Anthony Caruso) and Al (Al Molinaro) rob a jewelry store in Chicago. They stash the gems in a grain bin at a Crickly Wickly cereal factory until they think it is safe. The expensive jewelry winds up packed in boxes of Crickly Wickly cereal that is then shipped to Hooterville. Lisa buys some boxes of the cereal and opens them for the prize inside. Lisa knows real jewels when she sees them, but Oliver's sure they are just fake. Fred and Arnold come by and show Oliver and Lisa the jewelry they got from the cereal boxes. Oliver takes the jewelry to Pixley to be appraised and the Jeweler tells him they are real and worth $200,000. The Jeweler asks Oliver how he got them, but Oliver cannot bring himself to say they were in cereal boxes. After Oliver leaves, the jeweler calls the police. Oliver calls Mr. Bennett of the Crickly Wickly company and tells him about the jewelry. Bennett says they did not put any jewelry in the boxes and thinks Oliver is a nut. Mack and Al learn the jewelry went to Hooterville. Oliver tries to find out from Sam where the cereal came from, but Hank is there and makes things confusing. Sheriff Clyde Prentiss (Alan Hale Jr.) comes by and arrests Oliver for the jewelry store heist. Mack and Al come to the Sheriff's office pretending to be policeman from Chicago. But, they give themselves away and are arrested. Later, Sheriff Prentiss would like to talk to Lisa and Oliver because of a story Lisa told.
109	17	"Law Partners"	Richard L. Bare	Jay Sommers & Dick Chevillat	January 29, 1969	109
Young law school graduate Brian Williams (Rick Lenz) comes to speak with Oliver. He wants to start a law practice in Hooterville and would like Oliver to join him as a partner. Oliver tells Brian that he will think about it. Oliver asks Eb whether he could run the farm by himself. Oliver tells Lisa that he has decided to partner with Brian. Sam tells Oliver he almost married Brian's Aunt, but did not because she cheated at checkers. Hank comes by and has a confusing conversation about Brian. Oliver panics when Hank says he heard Brian was asking Haney about renting an office. Brian and Oliver do eventually rent an office from Haney. Oliver is organizing his law books. Oliver tells Eb that he will not be running the farm alone as Oliver will not be in the law office that much. Lisa wants to be Oliver's secretary. Lisa shows Oliver her dictation skills, but she writes in Hungarian. Oliver shows Lisa the law office. She wants to know why her name is not on the door. Haney comes by the office and gives Oliver a stuffed monkey as a gift. He then tries to sell Oliver a diploma, which Oliver turns down. Haney now wants to charge Oliver for the monkey and Oliver kicks him out.
110	18	"A Day in the Life of Oliver Wendell Holmes"	Richard L. Bare	Jay Sommers & Dick Chevillat	February 5, 1969	110
The law office of Douglas and Williams is open for business. Lisa has a hard time deciding what to wear for her secretary job. When Oliver gets to the office, he notices that his name is spelled Oliver Mendell Douglas on the sign and door. Haney charges Oliver to use the phone in the lobby of the theater that is below his office. The Telephone Man (Bob Hastings) is installing the office phone. Lisa is typing a letter and asks him how to spell words. She then destroys the typewriter. Lisa questions the way the Telephone Man is hooking up the telephone. He then explains to Lisa the buzzer system that she requested. Oliver wonders why there is only one phone and why it is on Lisa's desk. The buzzers that are by each desk are hooked up to fire alarm "clangers". Oliver finds out that the phone does not work. As Oliver, Lisa and Brian are heading to lunch, the Sign Painter (Vince Barnett) shows up. Haney charges Oliver again to use the phone. When Oliver comes back the door now reads Oliver Wendell Wilkie Holmes. Back at home, Oliver and Lisa have a confusing conversation with Hank. Later, to boost business, Lisa advertises a grand opening special with free prizes and discount law services. The ad in the paper gets Oliver and Brian in trouble with the local Bar Association. Ysabel MacCloskey as Farm Woman. Anthony Spinelli (as Sam Weston) as Farm Man.
111	19	"Economy Flight to Washington"	Richard L. Bare	Jay Sommers & Dick Chevillat	February 12, 1969	111
Eb would like a week off to go with the Hooterville Young People's Agricultural Society to a national convention in Washington, DC. Oliver at first says no. But after Lisa talks to him, Oliver then gives in. What Oliver does not know is that the Society consists of only Eb, Hank and Arnold. Lisa and Oliver take Eb to the Pixley airport. While Eb goes to look for the rest of the group, Lisa and Oliver have a confusing conversation with the Ticket Agent (Dave Willock). Oliver finally learns who is in the group. Eb and Hank board the plane and Arnold sneaks into the cockpit. Eb and Hank have a confusing conversation with Miss Jones (Renie Riano), the Stewardess. The Pilot (Reed Hadley) sees Arnold but then Arnold sneaks into the cabin. Miss Jones wants to throw Arnold off the plane. Eb gets Lisa and Oliver on the plane to smooth over the problem. While Oliver tries to get the hiding Arnold out of "the occupied", the plane takes off. After landing, they all go to the hotel. The Hotel Clerk (George Ives) tells them the convention was last week. Arnold goes to the bar where a Drunk (Foster Brooks) befriends him. Oliver calls Sam to see if he could find someone to care for Oliver's farm for a week. Haney gets on the phone and tries to charge Oliver for his farm minding service. Sam gets back on the phone and tells Oliver not to worry about the farm.
112	20	"Retreat From Washington"	Richard L. Bare	Jay Sommers & Dick Chevillat	February 19, 1969	112
The Douglases and their friends are still in Washington, DC. Hank gets an early wake up call from the hotel Operator (Nora Denney) so he can go sightseeing. Eb wakes up Oliver and Lisa and Arnold sneaks into Oliver's shower. While deciding what to do, Lisa suggests having lunch with the President and Eb goes with her. Hank wants to go see the Secretary of Agriculture. Meanwhile, the "Haney Farm Mindin' Service" leases out the Douglas house. Walter (Guy Raymond) and Minnie Holcombe (Fran Ryan) and their six children rent the house for $4 a day. At the Secretary of Agriculture, Hank has a confusing conversation with the Receptionist (Ketty Lester). Hank causes some more problems there. Lisa and Eb go to the White House to have the unannounced lunch with the President. They wind up getting arrested by a Policeman (Robert Sampson). Oliver finds them and Hank in jail. Arnold is there as well after causing problems in a laundromat. Oliver gets everyone out. They cut their trip short and head for home. Haney runs into Oliver and Lisa at Sam's store. Haney rushes to the Douglas farm to quickly evict the Holcombe's. He then stalls Oliver until the family can get out. Oliver does learn about Haney renting the house when Walter returns to get one of his kids out of the chimney.
113	21	"A Hunting We Won't Go"	Richard L. Bare	Jay Sommers & Dick Chevillat	February 26, 1969	113
A friendly doe wanders onto the farm and Lisa names her Clarissa. Lisa claims she can talk to Clarissa. Clarissa has three children, but she does not know what happened to her husband. Oliver mentions how deer hunting season starts soon. Oliver tries to hide that he ordered a gun and entered the deer hunting derby, but Lisa finds out. Sam is not any help when Oliver tries to keep the gun purchase quiet. Sam tells Oliver and Lisa that the Governor (Roy Roberts) will be in town for the start of hunting season. Lisa tells Oliver she does not want him shooting any deer. He tries to explain to her where her mink coat came from. Hank comes by and has a confusing conversation about whether deer are destructive or not. Lisa asks Brian's help and he suggests getting a petition going. Brian tells Oliver about the petition, but Oliver does not think Lisa will get one signature. After the locals read the petition, Lisa gets 300 signatures. Lisa goes to meet the Governor at the train station. He threatens Oliver and Lisa with jail time because her petition promises everyone who signed it will get $100 from Oliver. The Governor then tears up the petition. Lisa finds a way to ruin hunting season for everyone.
114	22	"Oh, Promise Me"	Richard L. Bare	Jay Sommers & Dick Chevillat	March 5, 1969	114
For their anniversary, Lisa wants a church wedding. They have a dispute over how long they have been married. Oliver thinks it has been 11 years, Lisa thinks it has been 10. Lisa will write to her mother and have her send them the marriage license. Things do not go well when Oliver tries to start his tractor. Lisa gets the letter and it was 10 years. Turns out that they had been mistakenly given a license to practice dentistry. Oliver wonders, because the license is in Hungarian, whether this is just a ploy by Lisa to have the church wedding. Oliver jokes that he is now a bachelor dentist. Lisa wants Oliver to move out until they have their church wedding, but he refuses. Oliver goes to the University language department and speaks with Professor Rockwell (Robert Rockwell). Rockwell confirms it is a dentist license. Rockwell says he has been looking for a good dentist. Eb tells Oliver that Lisa moved in with Alf and Ralph. After getting a license from Sam, Oliver and Lisa speak with Reverend Clements. Haney tries to sell Oliver and Lisa some wedding items, including Kitty Joy, the flower girl. Lisa comes up with an invitation list of 3000 people. At the wedding ceremony, Hank is best man and Ralph is maid of honor. As a wedding present, Lisa gets Oliver a dentist chair.
115	23	"Eb Uses His Ingenuity"	Richard L. Bare	Jay Sommers & Dick Chevillat	March 12, 1969	115
Hooterville has a big dance coming up soon. Oliver and Lisa buy tickets from Sam. Back at home, Lisa tries to show Oliver a modern dance move. He prefers the old fashioned way of dancing. Eb asks Oliver for a $20 advance on his salary. He wants to buy his girlfriend a birthday present and take her to the "swanky" Pixley Diner. Lisa wants money to go to Paris to get a new dress for the dance. Oliver says no to both of them. Oliver tells Eb to think of a way to earn the extra money. Oliver finds out from Ralph that Eb is renting out some of Lisa's clothing. Ralph thinks Oliver is hard up for cash. Minnie Holcombe comes by to rent a fur coat. Hank comes by and tells Oliver that Eb rented Oliver's car to him. Sam has rented one of Oliver's tuxedos. Oliver gives everyone their money back. Haney scams Eb out of the $10 he has earned so far and makes him the Midwest distributor for Lickwell Liver Lotion. Oliver wants the money he paid out to the people back from Eb. Eb gives him the Liver Lotion. Eb then babysits ten babies at once while their parents go to the dance. Arnold was going to help Eb, but Oliver sends the pig away. Oliver and Lisa skip the dance to help Eb.
116	24	"The Old Trunk"	Richard L. Bare	Jay Sommers & Dick Chevillat	March 19, 1969	116
Eb finds an old trunk in the barn. Eb and Oliver argue over who will own what is inside. Inside are some outdated stocks and bonds, a corset and a diary. The diary belonged to one Lydia Plunkett, a traveling saleswoman for corsets in 1898. Lisa reads the diary. Lydia (Eva Gabor) is traveling by train from Chicago to Beaver Hill, Nebraska. Onboard is Harry Wright (Eddie Albert), a competing corset salesman. Not knowing Lydia's profession, Harry tells her his secrets to selling and who he will be selling to in Beaver Hill. When Harry gets to his prospective buyers, they have all bought from someone else already. Harry runs into Lydia again and tells her where he is going next. The same thing happens to him. The next time he sees Lydia, he tells her he has been fired. He learns that Lydia was the competing salesperson and says he will get even with her. A year later, Lydia runs into Harry, who is now in advertising. She tells Harry she loves him. He winds up getting fired from the advertising job. They get married and Lydia becomes president of the corset company. Harry is relegated to housework. Harry leaves Lydia and her company goes bankrupt. Three years later the two get together again. Oliver and Lisa learn from Sam that the diary was a prop from a play and none of it is true. Gordon Jump as first salesman. Phil Gordon as second salesman. John Wheeler as Mr. Dabney.
117	25	"The Milk Maker"	Richard L. Bare	Jay Sommers & Dick Chevillat	March 26, 1969	117
Local inventor "Looney Luke" Needlinger (Percy Helton) has built a machine that turns hay into milk. Convinced it will make them rich, Haney and Fred ask Sam to invest $500. When Sam is not interested, the men decide to talk to Oliver. Meanwhile, Lisa is making a cake in the box the ingredients came in. Haney and Fred explain how the milk machine works, but Oliver thinks they are being conned. Oliver turns them down. Lisa's cake actually turns out good. Hank tells Oliver, Lisa and Sam that he is quitting his job and investing in Luke's invention. Oliver tells Hank to not take his money out of the bank just yet. Oliver and Lisa go to Luke's to see the machine. After seeing the machine in action, Oliver still believes it is fake. He thinks the milk is already in the machine. Luke shows Oliver the inside of the machine. Oliver asks if he could have a chemist friend of his look over the machine and Luke says sure. Oliver calls Charlie Williams (Foster Brooks) in New York. Charlie has a hard time believing Oliver, but agrees to test a sample of the milk. Eb tells Oliver that Eleanor the cow is going on strike because she heard about the milk machine. Oliver gets the results and has Haney, Hank and Fred come by. He tells them that there is a chemical that Luke used that would make the milk too expensive. Plus the chemical causes temporary baldness.
118	26	"The Reincarnation of Eb"	Richard L. Bare	Joel Kane	April 2, 1969	118
The Hooterville Volunteer Fire Department is holding a meeting. At the meeting, Arnold beats Hank at checkers. Haney says the town needs a search and rescue squad. Later, Lisa and Eb describe to Oliver a movie they just watched. It was about a grandfather who is reincarnated as a racehorse. Lisa says that her Uncle Rudolph came back as a goat. Eb says he would like to come back as a dog. The next day, Eb goes to Pixley to see his girlfriend, Lorelei. A nasty thunderstorm starts and Eb goes missing. Oliver goes looking for him and finds his motor scooter by a washed out bridge. Lisa is worried sick that something terrible has happened to Eb. Oliver goes to Drucker's store and tries to get the search and rescue squad organized. Back at home a large dog arrives and Lisa thinks it is Eb reincarnated. After he gets a call from Lisa, Oliver calls off the search because Eb is home. Oliver gets home and Lisa shows him the dog. Oliver tries to tell Lisa that the dog is not Eb. Oliver, while not meaning to, chases the dog out of the house. Oliver goes out looking for Eb again. Deputy Sheriff Carlson (Garry Walberg) comes by and asks for a description of Eb. Lisa describes the dog. Carlson yells at Lisa for wasting his time. Eb returns and tells Lisa he was at Ben Miller's house until the rain stopped. Oliver comes back with the dog.

=== Season 5 (1969–70) ===
No. overall	No. in season	Title	Directed by	Written by	Original release date	Prod. code
119	1	"Lisa's Mudder Comes for a Visit"	Richard L. Bare	Jay Sommers & Dick Chevillat	September 27, 1969	122
Lisa's "Mudder" (Mother) (Lilia Skala) pays a surprise visit. Mother is stunned when she sees the Douglas home. Kyoto (Jerry Fujikawa), her House Boy, thinks it might be the grounds keeper's home. Kyoto speaks with Lisa and learns who she is. Mother asks Lisa why her husband went from being a lawyer to a farmer. Oliver and Eb come home and see the large limousine. At first Mother thinks Eb is Lisa's husband. Mother keeps calling Oliver "What's his name". Lisa tells Oliver that Mother is staying for three weeks. Lisa also says that Mother is now a Countess because of a Villa she bought in Italy. Eb misunderstands and tells everyone she is the Queen of Sicily. Hank and Haney tell Sam that they should do something to celebrate the arrival of the Queen. They want to give her a 21-gun-salute using a cannon. At first, Sam refuses to give them the key to the cannon. Oliver tries to tell them that Mother is not a queen. Kyoto tries to teach Eb karate, but it does not go well. Fred and Arnold come by to see the Queen. Arnold brought the Queen flowers, but he eats them. The next day, they fire off the cannon. Haney gives Mother a solid gold wooden key to the city. A T.V. Announcer (Tom Lowell) comes by and starts filming Mother. As they only have 3 cannonballs, it takes all day and into the night to do 21 shots.
120	2	"Everybody Tries to Love a Countess"	Richard L. Bare	Jay Sommers & Dick Chevillat	October 4, 1969	123
Oliver's life is still turned upside down with Lisa's Mother around. Mother still has a hard time remembering who Oliver is. After two weeks there is not much for Mother to do. Oliver suggests Lisa take her to some of the local towns or farms. Mother thinks it might be time to go. Meanwhile, Kyoto makes a great breakfast for everyone else but serves Oliver Lisa's hotcakes. At Sam's store, Uncle Joe somehow gets a free soda, despite Sam wanting to charge him for it. Eb tells Sam, Haney and Joe that Mother will be leaving soon. Eb says Mother is bored because Oliver will not take her anywhere. Eb also mentions how wealthy she is. Now Haney and Joe are interested in courting Mother. Haney comes by the house and invites Mother to the Hooterville Fire Department Mardi Gras. Despite already being packed, Lisa talks Mother into staying. Haney says that the Mardi Gras will not be for another week. That night, Mother is watching TV with Haney. Oliver is trying to sleep and Joe shows up. Joe and Haney start fighting over Mother and Oliver kicks them out. Mother does not want to cause problems and says she will leave in the morning. Guest from Petticoat Junction: Edgar Buchanan as Uncle Joe Carson
121	3	"Where There's a Will"	Richard L. Bare	Jay Sommers & Dick Chevillat	October 11, 1969	119
Eb tells Oliver about Gus Birnbacher, the president of the Birnbacher Pork Company, who recently died. Eb says how Gus owed his success to his pig Herman and left the pig $20,000,000. Now there is a search for Herman's descendants as the pig also died. After hearing about Herman on TV, Fred thinks Arnold may be related. Fred goes to speak with Oliver and would like Oliver to go to Chicago to claim Arnold's inheritance. Fred says that Arnold can predict the weather with his tail just as Herman did. Oliver is not interested as he says they need more proof. Lisa tries to talk Oliver into going to Chicago. Haney comes by and wants to offer his services as a pig tracer. Sam tells Oliver how he is expanding his business to accommodate all the tourists that will be coming to Arnoldville. Oliver still refuses to go to Chicago. Eb tells Oliver that Arnold's tail is predicting rain. Oliver does not believe it as the weather bureau said no rain for a month. Hank confusingly tries to get Oliver to go. Lisa says that she will go to Chicago if Oliver will not. To appease Lisa, Oliver agrees to call Mr. Gerber (Roland Winters), who handles Herman's estate. While Oliver is talking to Gerber, it starts to rain. Gerber hears that Arnold's tail actually predicted the weather. Gerber would like to meet Arnold and Oliver reluctantly agrees to go to Chicago.
122	4	"A Tale of a Tail"	Richard L. Bare	Jay Sommers & Dick Chevillat	October 18, 1969	120
Eb reads to Oliver and Lisa an article in the newspaper about Arnold going to Chicago to prove that he is the rightful heir to the $20,000,000 Birnbach pork estate. In the article Oliver is mentioned as Arnold's famous "pig lawyer". Eb wants to go with as he can interpret Arnold's grunts. Oliver reluctantly agrees to have Eb go. As an heir, Arnold is supposed to be able to predict the weather with his tail. In Chicago, when people realize who Arnold is, he gets the royal treatment. At the hotel, the Desk Clerk (William O'Connell) says that Arnold will get the Royal Suite. Meanwhile, the Douglas's get a room the size of a closet. Eb calls Sam to keep him updated with what is going on with Arnold for the newspaper. Hank is at the store and he is making it hard for Sam to talk to Eb. Eb tells Sam that Oliver got into a fight with a Maintenance Man. Later, Oliver and Lisa go to Mr. Gerber's (Roland Winters) office to claim the money. Eb shows up with Arnold. Mr. Gerber would like to see Arnold's weather predicting capability. Arnold's tail makes the ridiculous prediction of snow in July. Suddenly, all the royal treatment disappears. The Desk Clerk gives Oliver a large bill that Arnold ran up hosting a champagne party and other things. Suddenly, a blizzard hits Chicago. Arnold is treated with respect once again. Vince Barnett as Baggage Man. Al Molinaro as Bellboy.
123	5	"You and Your Big Shrunken Head"	Richard L. Bare	Jay Sommers & Dick Chevillat	October 25, 1969	121
The Douglases, Eb, and a hopefully wealthy Arnold are returning from Chicago. Eb tells Oliver and Lisa that Arnold is driving the Cannonball. Arnold is thinking of buying the train. After they arrive in Hooterville, Oliver tells Fred that the money is still in probate. Arnold's cousin Jimmy came to visit. Haney comes by Oliver's farm with a bunch of men. Haney is taking the men on a tour of famous Arnold landmarks and introduces Oliver as Arnold's famous "pig lawyer". Fred asks if Arnold can hide at the Douglas house and Lisa says yes. Fred tells Lisa that Arnold is now the target of every salesman in the valley. There was even a blonde woman who claimed to be Arnold's wife. Arnold gives Lisa an expensive bracelet, Oliver gets a shrunken head and Hank a wristwatch. Thanks to Hank, a lot of salesmen wind up at the Douglas farm hoping to sell Arnold something. Oliver gets a call from Mr. Gerber, Birnbacher's lawyer. An Insurance Man (Dave Barry) follows Oliver up the telephone pole trying to sell Arnold a policy. They wind up falling off the pole. Oliver calls Gerber from Sam's store. Gerber tells Oliver that the will is being contested by Birnbacher's sister-in-law. Hank Worden as Man. Vic Mizzy as Organ Salesman.
124	6	"The Road"	Richard L. Bare	Jay Sommers and John L. Greene	November 1, 1969	128
Everyone is upset by the dust that is stirred up from Hooterville's dirt road. Hank has a confusing conversation with Oliver about his soil sample and the dust. Lisa tells Oliver that she broke the electric fan by trying to slice bananas with it. Oliver learns from Sam and Fred that money to pave the road was appropriated thirty years earlier. Oliver at first does not want to get involved. But after a face full of dust, he changes his mind. Oliver and Lisa go to the County Road Department and speak with Mr. Gordon (Dave Willock). They get no results there and head to the state capitol. Sen. Lyle Talbot (Lyle Talbot), after some confusion, tells them that he will look into the problem immediately. Eb tells Oliver that they are going to tear down the Ziffel's house to put in the new road. Oliver and Lisa go to the Ziffel house and try to stop the bulldozer driver. Oliver says he did not ask for a new road, they should just pave the old one. Oliver and Lisa are going back to the Senator. Haney tells Oliver to mention his cousin, powerful hot dog vendor "Big Joe" Haney. Oliver makes no headway with Talbot on saving the Ziffel home. Lisa then says the name "Big Joe" Haney and Talbot agrees to everything that Oliver wants. Eb tells Oliver that the locals are planning to tar and feather him. They have been assessed millions of dollars to cover the increased cost of highway building since the project was budgeted three decades earlier. Fran Ryan as Doris Ziffel.
125	7	"Four of Spades"	Richard L. Bare	Jay Sommers and John L. Greene	November 8, 1969	127
Lisa the fortune-teller draws a four of spades from a deck of cards. That means a tall stranger will soon enter Oliver's life. Eb tells Lisa and Oliver that he got a letter from childhood friend, Tadpole Talbot (Tommy Roe). Tadpole is coming to visit. Tadpole arrives in his large RV. He is now a successful recording star and his newest song is called "Four Of Spades". Tadpole tells Oliver that he grew up with Eb and Eb helped him along the way. He would like to show Eb his appreciation. Tadpole sings "Four Of Spades" for Oliver, Lisa and Eb. All during the song, light bulbs explode leaving them in the dark. Tadpole hires Eb to go on the road with him and plug his music. Eb is not gone long before Lisa misses him. Now that Eb is gone, Haney comes by and offers Oliver his employment services. Oliver keeps trying to tell Haney that he is not hiring anyone. Oliver and Lisa receive postcards and letters from Eb, describing the places he has been. In his last letter, Eb asks Oliver to send him $300. Eb comes home and says that show business was not as glamorous as he had imagined. Plus, he caused an explosion when he plugged Tadpole's AC guitar amplifier into a DC outlet. Eb gets his old job back, but without a raise he asked for.
126	8	"The Youth Center"	Richard L. Bare	Jay Sommers and John L. Greene	November 15, 1969	129
Alf and Ralph are now working for the County Road Sign Department. Oliver points out that their signs have words that are spelled wrong. Oliver is surprised to learn about the declining population of Hooterville. Sam tells him all the young people are moving away to the city. Horace Colby (Hal Smith) tells Oliver that he will be selling his farm. His two sons, that helped him run it, are moving to the city. Horace cannot manage on his own and wonders if Oliver is interested in buying the farm. Oliver wants to have a town meeting to find ways to keep the young people from moving away. Lisa tells him not to get involved because his "goo dooding" always backfires. At the meeting, Oliver brings up the problem of the young people leaving. Before he knows what happened, Oliver is the one appointed to figure out what to do. Oliver asks Eb what can be done to keep the young people from leaving. Eb has several silly suggestions. Oliver asks Eb if a youth center would help. Oliver holds another meeting and gets talked into volunteering his barn to be the youth center. The others then offer to chip in things for the youth center. Oliver thinks they should donate money to get new things for the center. The youth center is a hit with the kids. A new problem arises. The kids stay at the center so late, they are too tired the next day to work.
127	9	"The Special Delivery Letter"	Richard L. Bare	T : Jay Sommers & Dick Chevillat; S/T : Scott Anderson	November 22, 1969	132
Eb tells Oliver that there is a special delivery letter for him at Drucker's store. Lisa keeps trying to guess who sent the letter. When Oliver tries to pick up his letter, Sam tells him he must have given it to Hank by mistake. Hank and Lisa have a confusing conversation. Hank tells Oliver that he gave the letter to Fred, who would then drop it off at Oliver's house. Fred has not come by the Douglas house yet, so Oliver and Lisa go to the Ziffel house. Fred and Doris say that they gave the letter to Arnold to drop off. Arnold tells Fred that he dropped the letter in a mailbox in Pixley after his swimming lesson. The next morning, Oliver and Lisa head to the Pixley Post Office. At the Post Office, Oliver has to deal with two sets of identical twins who are working at the windows. The one clerk says the letter was probably put on the Cannonball and sent back to Hooterville. When they get back to Sam's store, it is closed and Haney is outside. Haney charges Oliver to answer his questions. Haney then tries to sell Oliver some opera glasses to look inside the store. After that, Haney tries to sell Oliver ways to break into the store. Just then, Sam comes back and tells Oliver that he left the letter with Eb at the house. Eb wants identification before giving the letter to Oliver. It turns out the letter was for Lisa and because of all the running around, she missed a sale on chinchilla coats. Lisa thinks Oliver staged the whole thing to avoid buying her a coat. Chanin Hale as Post Office Clerk. Robert Nichols as Post Office Clerk.
128	10	"Oliver's Schoolgirl Crush"	Richard L. Bare	Jay Sommers & Dick Chevillat	November 29, 1969	126
Mr. Wurthwaxer (Herbert Anderson), the principal of Hooterville High, comes to speak with Oliver. Wurthwaxer would like Oliver to speak to the class about a law career. Lisa goes into a long story about Oliver and a secretary at his old law firm. Later, Hank introduces veterinarian Dr. Livermore to Oliver. Hank proceeds to have his usual confusing conversation with the two men. While Oliver is speaking to the class, he makes a great impression on one student, Kathy Baxter (Heather North). The teenage girl seems to be developing a crush on Oliver. After class, Kathy asks Oliver if he is married. Back at home, Oliver tries to tell Lisa what he told the class, but she keeps interrupting him. Kathy comes by the house and implies Lisa is old. She then proceeds to fawn all over Oliver. Lisa tells Oliver that Kathy obviously has a crush on him. Kathy breaks her date with Alfred Newton (Rusty Hamer). Oliver and Lisa are about to go to the movies, when Kathy comes by. Lisa invites Kathy to go along and she excepts. The next day, Alfred asks Kathy if they are still going steady. He brings up how she develops a crush on every speaker who visits. Alfred comes by the Douglas house and tells Lisa how young she looks. He then confronts Oliver about stealing Kathy from him. Oliver comes up with a plan to have Dr. Livermore talk to the class and have Kathy fall for him.
129	11	"Ralph's Nuptials"	Richard L. Bare	Jay Sommers & Dick Chevillat	December 13, 1969	133
Ralph comes by early one morning and tells Lisa and Oliver that she is engaged to Hank. Apparently, Ralph and Hank were at a drive in movie. Hank got into a fight with another guy after getting into the wrong car. Coming home from the emergency hospital and under the influence of medication, Hank proposed. The wedding is this coming Sunday. Lisa tells Ralph that her and Oliver will pay for the wedding. The way Lisa is planning the wedding, it is going to be bigger and more expensive than Oliver figured. Oliver agrees to Haney's much cheaper wedding services package. Alf is a little sad about the wedding as it will break up their business. But then he wishes Ralph all the best. It is the day of the wedding and Haney does not quite have everything ready yet. Hank is a nervous wreck and Oliver tries to calm him down. Sam performs the ceremony. Hank and Ralph drive off on their honeymoon. Sam realizes that his Justice of the Peace license has expired and the couple are not really married. Hank and Ralph get to their hotel room. Ralph has Hank take a walk while she gets things ready. The next morning, Ralph tells Oliver and Lisa that Hank is in the emergency room. He went into the wrong hotel room and got beat up again. Lisa tells Ralph about Sam not being licensed and they will just plan another wedding.
130	12	"Oliver and the Cornstalk"	Richard L. Bare	Jay Sommers & Dick Chevillat	December 20, 1969	124
Oliver goes to Sam's store to pick up his seed corn. There is a conversation with Fred and Arnold about Arnold's inheritance still being tied up. Oliver tries to fix his tractor motor, but it does not go smoothly. With minimal help from Eb, Oliver finally gets the fields plowed. Oliver is about to start planting his seed, when Haney comes by. Haney tries to sell Oliver "Agnes Cudahy's seed spitting service". He also tries to sell a crow detection service. Oliver starts planting his seed. Trying to be a useful farm wife, Lisa serves some dreadful lemonade which Oliver pours out in the field. The next morning Eb brings Oliver to the spot where he poured out the lemonade. There they find a giant cornstalk that reaches up into the clouds. A little boy named Jack says he saw a giant in a green suit up the cornstalk. Someone up the stalk bellows "Ho, Ho, Ho" and drops a can of corn. Eb climbs up the stalk. Hank comes by and tells Oliver that the explanation for the stalk is that he is in a TV commercial. Eb comes down with a giant ear of corn. Then a girl named Jacqueline comes down the stalk. Eb yells up to the giant to send down some creamed corn and it drops down both by the bucketful and then the can. Turns out the corn stalk was all a dream Oliver was having.
131	13	"Beauty is Skin Deep"	Richard L. Bare	Jay Sommers & Dick Chevillat	December 27, 1969	125
Lisa is surprised that Sam hardly stocks any "cosmeteticals" in his store. She offers to put together a display table for his business. Oliver tries to talk Sam out of it. Back at home, Oliver cannot believe some of the things Lisa is putting on her list of things to order. Haney comes by the Douglas house and tries to sell Lisa some cosmetics that contain hamster milk. To prove his product works, Haney introduces Lisa and Oliver to a 21-year-old woman (Chanin Hale) who he claims is his 93-year-old great-great-grandmother. The Monroe brothers come by and Lisa tells Ralph about her new business. Instead of working on the bedroom, Alf and Ralph go to Sam's to build more shelves for Lisa. Sam complains to Lisa about all the noise Alf and Ralph are making and that Ralph sawed through his telephone wire. Sam says that maybe they should forget about the cosmetics. Lisa says there will not be any more problems. Sam is upset when 395 cartons of Lady Love cosmetics are delivered to his store. Lisa says that is just the first shipment. Lisa forces Sam's business out onto his front porch as she has taken over his whole store. Oliver tells Sam he will talk to Lisa about moving her business somewhere else. Lisa sets up shop in their living room and moves all of their furniture into the front yard.
132	14	"The Wish-Book"	Richard L. Bare	Jay Sommers & Dick Chevillat	January 3, 1970	131
It is raining outside and Lisa wants to get romantic, but Oliver says he has book work to do. While trying to get his frog Al from a hole in the wall, Eb pulls out a Wish Book (Mail Order Catalog) from 1898. Lisa and Oliver remark how inexpensive things were back then. Haney comes by to deliver some frog food. When he sees the Wish Book, Haney tells the story of Calvin (Eddie Albert) and Tessie (Eva Gabor) Whittaker, who once owned the Douglases' house. Calvin decorated the house with items from the catalog. Calvin wants to start a dairy farm and orders a cream separator from the catalog. A magic lantern projector is mistakenly delivered by the catalog company. Sensing money to be made, Calvin wants to open a Wall Picture Theater in Pixley. He rents Fritz Kimball's (Alvy Moore) butcher shop at night to show a slide of Abraham Lincoln standing on his head. Calvin's Theater is a huge success. But then there is a heat wave and the crowds stop coming. Calvin is able to get people to come back when he opens Fritz's freezer to cool the building. When Calvin breaks the slide of Lincoln, he comes up with the idea to move his hand in front of the projector creating his Moving Wall Picture Theater. He eventually goes to Hollywood to pitch his idea of moving wall pictures. Producer Sam Fogel (Larry D. Mann), who Calvin talks to, is not interested. However, Sam sees something in Tessie and she becomes a silent film star. Later, Calvin comes up with the idea to put a mouse named Dickey into films. Sam is not interested. Hagan Beggs as Man.
133	15	"Rest and Relaxation"	Richard L. Bare	Jay Sommers & Dick Chevillat	January 10, 1970	135
Oliver's old friend, reporter Mort Warner (Robert Cummings), comes to Hooterville to relax and soothe his rattled nerves. Mort tries to be polite when he sees the run down house. Mort is surprised by Lisa's syrupy coffee and cream. He is then sprayed with oil by Oliver's rickety tractor. While Mort is cleaning up in the bedroom, Arnold comes by to watch TV. Mort is about to take a shower. Eb winds up getting Lisa to turn on the water while Mort still has his robe on. Fred comes by looking for Arnold and he startles Mort. He is still in the shower when Hank comes by and asks him if he wants to go quail-hunting. Oliver lets Mort use his car to drive around and relax. Mort gets a flat tire and the key breaks off in the trunk lock. Haney comes by and tries to hustle Mort with his phony Auto Club. Mort has to finally chase Haney away. Not knowing Oliver lent Mort the car, Eb calls the Sheriff (Joe Higgins) thinking it was stolen. The Sheriff arrests Mort for stealing the Douglas' car. After speaking with Lisa, the Sheriff is about to free Mort, but he does not have the keys to the handcuffs. Eb tries to saw off the handcuffs, but he saws Mort's watch in half. Lisa manages to get the handcuffs off and Mort says he is leaving. While trying to make a phone call, quail-hunting Hank fills Mort's behind with buckshot. Mort now has to stay for another week.
134	16	"Trapped"	Richard L. Bare	Jay Sommers & Dick Chevillat	January 17, 1970	136
Oliver and Lisa realize that they have had a door they have never opened. Upon doing so they find a cave-like cellar, with a secret entrance to a room where older generations of Mr. Haney's family used an illegal still. But a sneeze from Lisa collapses the entrance, and the two are trapped down there. The only way to call for help is through the sink pipe in the kitchen. Eb responds and Oliver tells him about the door to the cellar. Oliver says they are trapped behind the collapsed entrance and they need to be dug out. Eb goes to Sam's for help. Sam is mopping his floor. Eb slips on the floor, bumps his head and forgets what he was doing. Hours later, Hank comes by and hears Oliver calling through the pipe. Oliver asks for help and Hank goes to get a plumber. Arnold comes by and Lisa asks him to get help. Haney is at Sam's store when Arnold arrives. Arnold plays a game of charades to give Sam the message about Oliver and Lisa. Eb then also remembers about them being trapped. Meanwhile, Lisa tells Oliver that being married to him is the best thing that ever happened to her. Sam, Eb and Haney arrive at the house to dig out the couple. That night, Oliver is awakened by Hank trying to pull them up through the pipe using a plunger.
135	17	"Bundle of Joy"	Richard L. Bare	T : Jay Sommers & Dick Chevillat; S/T : Searle Kramer	January 24, 1970	134
Oliver travels to New York to help with a case for his old law firm. In New York, Judd Carling (Herb Voland) tries to start the meeting with clients Mr. Robinson (Bartlett Robinson) and Mr. Sternweiss. But they keep getting interrupted by the secretaries kissing Oliver hello. Back at home, Eb finds what he thinks is a baby in a basket on the doorstep. It turns out to be a puppy named Freddie. Lisa interrupts Oliver's meeting to tell him about "Little Freddie". But she does not tell Oliver it is a dog. Thinking it is a human child, he tries to talk her into calling the sheriff. When Lisa refuses, Oliver calls the Hooterville sheriff's office. Carling and the clients are getting very annoyed. The sheriff is on vacation so Oliver winds up talking to Hank. After a confusing conversation, Oliver tells Hank to get Sam's help. Meanwhile, Haney is trying to sell Sam a new cash register. Hank tells Sam and Haney about the baby and Haney goes to the house. Haney tries to sell Lisa baby supplies. After finding out it is a dog, Haney tries selling his puppy raising service. When he gets another confusing call from Lisa, Oliver abandons his case and races back home to Hooterville. Oliver is upset when he finds out about Freddie being a dog. Oliver wants to get rid of the puppy and Lisa starts crying. When Lisa finds lipstick on Oliver's handkerchief, he agrees to let her keep the dog. Patience Cleveland as Janet Glassworth.
136	18	"The Ex-Con"	Richard L. Bare	Jay Sommers & Dick Chevillat	January 31, 1970	130
Oliver is to give a speech to the County Bar Association on the virtues of hiring ex-convicts. Lisa would like to go with, but Oliver tells her it is men only. Oliver's speech is so long and boring that just about everyone has left before he has finished. When Oliver tells Lisa about the evening, she falls asleep on him. Ex-con Willie Dunhill (John Qualen) shows up to Oliver's house looking for a job. Willie's been in prison several times. Oliver is pressured into hiring him. Willie meets Hank and Hank notices that Willie is wearing prison work clothes. Oliver asks Hank to not mention to others about Willie's past. Willie tells stories about his old criminal buddies to Lisa and calls Oliver "Warden". Willie shows Lisa how to pick a pocket. Haney tries to sell Oliver a burglar alarm. Oliver gets electrocuted when he tries to remove the alarm. Oliver sends Haney away. Eb is having a hard time adjusting to having Willie as a "cellmate". Later, Willie tells Oliver about the things he misses from prison. On his day off, Willie goes to Pixley. There he breaks the window of a jewelry store, takes some jewelry and gets arrested. Oliver offers to defend Willie, but Willie wants to go to jail. Don Keefer as Carl Kelcy. Vince Barnett as Waiter. Hal Baylor as Policeman.
137	19	"The Cow Killer"	Richard L. Bare	T : Jay Sommers & Dick Chevillat; S/T : Scott Anderson	February 7, 1970	137
The broken down truck Haney delivers is not the modern one Oliver made a down payment on. Oliver gives Haney until six that evening to return his $200 down payment or face jail time for fraud. Meanwhile, Irene, Horace Colby's cow, keeps trampling Oliver's corn. Horace gets Oliver to agree to fix the fence. Mr. Wheeler (Allan Melvin), an advertising man, would like to put up a billboard on Oliver's property, but Lisa tells him Oliver would not be interested. Irene comes back and Oliver and Eb try to move her. Hank comes by, whispers in the cow's ear and Irene leaves. Hank told her that if she did not leave, Oliver would shoot her with a shotgun. Hank gives Oliver a shotgun. Irene is now in Oliver's apple orchard. He attempts to scare Irene away by firing the shotgun into the air. This frightens the advertising men who think they are being shot at. When they speed away in their truck, a life-sized fiberglass cow falls off their roof. Eb and Lisa see the fake cow and think Oliver shot Irene. Haney comes by and realizes it is fake. He charges Lisa to dispose of "Irene". Lisa and Eb confront Oliver about shooting Irene. Haney gets Lisa to give him her cow Eleanor to supposedly give to Colby. Haney charges Colby for Eleanor. Haney then charges Lisa for the fake cow claiming it is Irene stuffed. Lisa and Eb figure out that Oliver did not shoot any cow. Haney sells the fake cow back to Mr. Wheeler. Eb gets Eleanor back from Colby, but they will have to pay him. Haney, with a little help from Lisa, gives Oliver his money back for the truck.
138	20	"The Confrontation"	Richard L. Bare	Jay Sommers & Dick Chevillat	February 14, 1970	138
Oliver is elected School Board President. At the meeting where Oliver is to be installed, Haney introduces Principal Harvey Jackson (Frank Ferguson). Harvey thanks out going president, Sam Drucker. Sam has a few words and then he brings up Oliver. In class, teacher Mrs. Maxwell (Helen Kleeb) tells the students about the upcoming County Student Art Contest. While she is writing on the chalkboard, Willie (Johnny Whitaker) pops Mrs. Maxwell with a pea shooter. He then frames class mascot Arnold for the crime. Fred Ziffel tells Oliver that Arnold has been expelled from school. Oliver speaks to Harvey, but Harvey refuses to reinstate Arnold. The children come to the Douglas house and tell Oliver that as President he should reinstate Arnold. Oliver says he has spoken with the Principal with no luck. Something Oliver also says leads the children to start a protest movement. Harvey blames Oliver and he wants Oliver to put an end to it. Oliver goes to ask Sam's help. Haney comes by and tells them that Harvey called the Sheriff (Joe Higgins) on the children. Oliver goes to see Harvey one more time. While there, they learn that Arnold won the County Student Art Contest with his painting "Nude at a Filling Station". Harvey feels obligated to let Arnold back in class. Fred tells Oliver that Arnold will not go back to school until Harvey apologizes to him. Oliver finds a way to get Harvey to apologize. Arnold gives his painting to Oliver and Lisa.
139	21	"The Case of the Hooterville Refund Fraud"	Richard L. Bare	T : Jay Sommers & Dick Chevillat; S/T : Arnold Horwitt	February 28, 1970	139
Harold Gilmore (Jay Jostyn), of the IRS, tells the story of the Hooterville refund fraud case. Oliver's tax refund check inspires the farmers of Hooterville to request their refunds, too. Not realizing that one has to actually pay taxes first, they write in and report their losses for the last ten years. Hank comes by and asks Oliver how he can get a refund. Oliver tries to explain that the farmers never paid a tax so they will not get a refund. Gilmore says that thanks to a malfunction in the government computer, the locals receive more than $572,000. Gilmore then goes on to say that Senator Hansen (Robert Carson) questioned him about the mistake. Senator Hansen says that as it is an election year, he wants the recovery of that money to be done without much publicity. IRS agent Fred Feldinger (Tom Lowell) comes to Hooterville. When he fails to get the money back from the farmers, he goes to see Oliver. After Oliver explains that the farmers are basically honest, Feldinger asks Oliver to speak to them. But, the farmers have already invested their money in Haney's monkey racing track. Oliver tells Feldinger about the monkey racing track. Fred comes by and tells them that they are going to name the track after Oliver. This makes Feldinger suspicious. Lisa makes a suggestion. Gilmore goes on to say that to avoid bad press, they took Lisa's advice and the government became a silent partner in the enterprise where monkeys chase after a wooden bouncing banana. They hope to make their money back after a couple years.
140	22	"The Picnic"	Richard L. Bare	Jay Sommers & Dick Chevillat	March 7, 1970	140
Oliver invites Lisa to have a simple, romantic Sunday picnic. Haney comes by and tries to sell the couple picnic supplies. Eb wants to go on the picnic as well. Lisa makes Oliver say yes. Oliver tells Eb that after he has eaten at the picnic, he is to leave them alone. Sam learns about the picnic when Lisa and Oliver come by the store to buy food. Sam hints that he would like to go along. But when Oliver tells him what day it will be, Sam says he had plans with the Wheelers (Larry D. Mann and Mona Bruns). Hank finds out about the picnic as well. On the way to the picnic, Eb wants to pick up his girlfriend Linda Wheeler (Maggie Peterson). Oliver is not happy about it. Linda then brings along her accordion, her parents and her Grandpa (Patrick Cranshaw). The Wheelers say they need to pick up Sam because he was originally invited over for dinner. They pick up Sam, his date Clara Burton (Jane Connell) and her sousaphone. But there is not enough room in the car. Hank winds up driving Sam and Clara. Oliver has to fix a flat tire. They all stop at a gas station where Grandpa winds up with Hank. When Hank gets to the picnic stop, he has with him an Old Lady (Merie Earle) that Grandpa picked up at the gas station. That night Lisa and Oliver are having some champagne and caviar at home. When everyone shows up to celebrate Grandpa's engagement, Oliver and Lisa take refuge in the barn.
141	23	"The Beeping Rock"	Richard L. Bare	Jay Sommers & Dick Chevillat	March 21, 1970	141
Oliver mentions how great of an achievement men walking on the Moon was. Eb tells Oliver that eleven-year-old child inventor Dinky Watson (Johnny Whitaker) built a rocket ship and went to the Moon. Dinky even brought back some Moon rocks. Eb calls Dinky on a ring radio that Dinky built. Precocious Dinky comes by on a go cart powered by solar energy. Dinky offers to sell a Moon rock for $14, but Oliver declines. Lisa, however, does buy the rock. Oliver does not believe the rock is from the Moon. That night, the rock starts beeping when moonlight strikes it. The next day, Oliver asks Dinky how he made the rock beep, but Dinky denies having anything to do with it. Oliver has Doc John Stuart (Frank Ferguson) X-ray the rock, but comes up with nothing. Haney comes by the house, tells Oliver his Moon rock is fake and tries to sell him some real Moon rocks. Haney also says he has Mars rocks that came from a flying saucer. Arnold comes by and when he oinks at the rock, it starts beeping. Hank tells Oliver about a display of Moon rocks at the state capitol. Oliver thinks that Dinky may have stolen the rock. Oliver calls NASA and speaks to Wilson (Jerome Cowan) about possibly having a Moon rock. Wilson thinks Oliver is either drunk or crazy. Oliver finally sends the rock to NASA. There, Doctor Stoddard (Arthur Peterson) tells Wilson it is a real Moon rock and they do beep.
142	24	"Uncle Fedor"	Richard L. Bare	Jay Sommers & Dick Chevillat	March 28, 1970	143
Sam comes by the Douglas house early in the morning with a special delivery letter. Lisa's Uncle Fedor (Leo Fuchs) is arriving that day for a visit. Lisa tells Oliver that Fedor's letter was very mysterious. Fedor arrives at the airport and is very suspicious of his surroundings. He asks Lisa if he can trust Oliver. Fedor looks for hidden microphones around the house. He claims he is being followed by the Secret Police because he smuggled a secret formula out of Hungary. Oliver believes the whole story is phony and Fedor is just here to freeload off of them for a while. Sam tells Oliver that a man with a scar showed up and asked if the Douglas' had anyone staying with them. Sam tells Oliver that he will not say anything about Fedor. Fedor takes to hiding under Lisa's bed. Haney comes by offering his protection services. Part of the service includes a dog disguised as a monkey. Hank stops by and has a confusing conversation about Fedor. Eb says that he saw a man with a scar on his face hiding in the corn field. But he left when he saw Eb. That night, the man with the scar (Len Lesser) comes to the back door looking for Fedor. He says he is with the New York City District Attorney's Office and has an arrest warrant for Fedor. Fedor is wanted for back alimony. But when they look for Fedor, he is already gone. Jonathan Hole as Claxton. Jerry Hausner as Watkins.
143	25	"The Wealthy Landowner"	Richard L. Bare	Jay Sommers & Dick Chevillat	April 4, 1970	142
Oliver and Lisa go to Sam's to pick up their mail. Eb got over 400 letters. At home Eb explains that he put an ad in the lonely hearts section of a magazine. He describes himself as a handsome and wealthy landowner looking for marriage. Oliver does not think it was right for Eb to lie that way. Eb begins corresponding with a young woman named Celia Ward. She describes herself as young and wealthy. With each letter, Eb exaggerates his wealth and lifestyle more and more. Oliver believes that Celia is lying about her wealth and life as much as Eb is. Hank comes by, and after some confusion, gives Oliver a telegram for Eb that says Celia is coming for a visit. Eb panics a little and asks Oliver's help. Oliver tells him he started this mess, so he has to get out of it. Eb hires Haney to act as his chauffeur and they pick up Celia at the train station. Eb claims to own the train. Meanwhile, Oliver wonders why a wealthy woman would need to put an ad in a paper. They then drive around Hooterville and Eb shows off all the land he claims to own. Oliver needs the car and wonders where Eb could be. Eb then passes off the Douglases as poor sharecroppers who work for him. Oliver insists that Eb tell Celia the truth. Benson the Chauffeur (Ivor Barry) arrives to take Celia back to New York. Now Oliver believes Celia is really wealthy. Back in New York, it turns out Benson is Celia's father and she is really a maid. A Sarah Maxwell shows up at the Douglas house with her five children to answer Eb's ad. Sarah wants $8000 from Eb for a divorce. Eb passes Oliver off as Eb Dawson.
144	26	"Happy Birthday"	Richard L. Bare	Jay Sommers & Dick Chevillat	April 11, 1970	144
Oliver learns from Sam that he shares a birthday with Arnold, which is the next day. Back at home, Lisa is washing the curtains on the rod in the washing machine. Lisa says that Oliver and Arnold should celebrate together, but Oliver says no. Lisa then asks Oliver if he would like a surprise party. Oliver says he does not want any fuss made over his birthday. Haney comes by and wants to know what Oliver wants to buy Arnold for his birthday. Haney shows him a selection of ridiculous gifts and Oliver sends him away. Oliver tells Eb that he just wants a nice quiet birthday. Lisa and Eb make it sound as though their presents for Oliver are alive. The next morning Eb says that Lisa's present ate his present and then flew away. Eb and Lisa go looking for her present. Lisa gives Oliver birthday hot cakes with a candle in them. Fred and Arnold come by and Arnold gives Oliver an electric snout warmer as a present. Fred then invites them to a black tie birthday party for Arnold that evening. That night, Lisa leaves for the party, but Oliver stays home. Hank comes by, wishes Oliver a happy birthday and mentions a party. Thinking there is a surprise party for him, Oliver puts on his tux and goes to various places looking for it. In the end, there was no party for him, but he gets another surprise. All their furniture is stolen. Merie Earle as Sarah Hotchkiss.

=== Season 6 (1970–71) ===
No. overall	No. in season	Title	Directed by	Written by	Original release date	Prod. code
145	1	"The City Kids"	Richard L. Bare	Jay Sommers & Dick Chevillat	September 15, 1970	146
Oliver invites four city children to spend a week on the farm as part of a "Kids for the Country" program. Oliver has to figure out where the children will sleep. Haney comes by with Melvin (John Wheeler), an out of work actor, who is wearing an invisible suit. Haney tries to rent Oliver some cots for the kids to sleep on. Melvin takes off his suit. Oliver does rent the cots, but at his price. The children, Lori Baker (Victoria Paige Meyerink), George Carlson, Roy Takahashi and John Bennet, arrive. The kids have never seen a chicken or a cow before. Oliver shows them how he milks Eleanor the cow. Oliver shows them his corn field and his tomatoes. Oliver teaches them to plant seeds. Hank comes by and has a confusing conversation about the seeds. Lisa learns that Lori lives with her aunt. While Oliver takes the three boys swimming, Lisa bonds with Lori. The two have a great time canning jars of Lisa's newest creation, banana jelly. It has been six days and the kids are disappointed that their seeds have not grown. The next day, Lisa finds a way to have vegetables in the children's garden. Lisa, Oliver and Eb take the kids to the train station. As the train leaves, they see that Lori had gotten off. Lisa talks Oliver into letting Lori stay for another week.
146	2	"The Coming-Out Party"	Richard L. Bare	Jay Sommers & Dick Chevillat	September 22, 1970	147
Eb reads Oliver a fanciful story in the local paper about how Lori came to stay with them. It involves Lori being an heiress to millions, Oliver being shot by the mob and other silly things. Lisa plans a "coming out party" for little Lori so she can meet all the other children of Hooterville. Lisa wants an elaborate party, but Oliver says keep it simple. After speaking to Lori, Lisa decides to have a circus party. Lisa tries to rent an elephant from Mr. Haney. Oliver says no and tells her to have a plain party. Meanwhile, Oliver searches for a replacement part for his ancient Hoyt-Clagwell tractor so he can begin planting. He goes to Sam's store. Sam tells Oliver that Lisa wanted special invitations for the party, but Oliver says to forget them. Oliver asks Sam about the part for the tractor. Sam knows someone who might be able to make the part. When he gets home, Oliver finds Haney there with a biplane to give rides to the kids. Lisa tells Oliver that he said have a "plane" party. Oliver says no to the plane. Oliver is working on his tractor when Hank comes by and annoys him. Sam calls and tells Oliver he cannot get the part. Lisa wants to go to New York to buy Lori and herself new dresses. Oliver says no. The morning of the party, Lori meets Arnold. They wind up having a simple party which Lori enjoyed. Oliver comes home having no luck renting a tractor. During the party, the kids had a scavenger hunt and Arnold finds the part Oliver needs for his tractor.
147	3	"Jealousy"	Richard L. Bare	Jay Sommers & Dick Chevillat	September 29, 1970	145
Lisa is buying Lori a lot of new dresses. Oliver reminds Lisa that one day Lori will be going back to her Aunt. Eb keeps asking Oliver to buy him a car and Oliver keeps saying no. Lisa tells Eb that she will talk to Oliver. Eb notices that his "parents" bought Lori a new bicycle. Oliver is trying to take a nap, but he keeps getting interrupted. Arnold comes by and plays his toy piano. Oliver and Lisa then see Lori playing Arnold's piano. Arnold suggests that they rent a piano for Lori. Haney comes by and after some negotiating, Oliver rents a piano from him. Eb then sees the piano and gets upset. Lisa feels that Eb is jealous of Lori. Hank comes by, and after a confusing conversation, invites Oliver and Lori to a picnic. Eb feels he has been replaced in the Douglas family and decides to leave to find a new job. Lori asks him to stay, but he still leaves. Eb stops by Drucker's store and tells Sam how Oliver lost $4000 that Eb had saved for a car on a drunken gambling spree in Las Vegas. Realizing how expensive it would be to live on his own, Eb quickly returns home. When he gets there, Eb discovers that Oliver has bought him a car. Oliver actually calls Eb his son. Oliver tells Lisa he now has to wash his mouth out with soap. Patrick Cranshaw as Old Man. Elsie Baker as Old Lady.
148	4	"A Royal Love Story"	Richard L. Bare	Jay Sommers & Dick Chevillat	October 6, 1970	149
Lisa, Oliver and Lori are at Sam's store trying to find something to make for dinner. Lori is sneezing a lot and Lisa is worried. Back at home, Oliver tells Lisa that the doctor says that Lori just has a virus and will be fine. That night, Eb tries to entertain Lori with a magic trick, but it does not work. Lori wants to hear a story. Lisa tells little Lori a fanciful story of her courtship with Oliver. Princess Lisa and her father, the King of Hungary (Oscar Beregi), had to leave the country after it was invaded. The two shared an apartment in Paris. The King is running out of things to pawn in order to pay the rent. He wants Lisa to get a job. Lisa tries to get a job as a dancer with no luck. She finally gets a job as a waitress at a sidewalk cafe. Oliver is in Paris as a tourist and meets Lisa at the cafe. There is some confusion and Oliver winds up with a lot of bottles of champagne. Lisa takes Oliver on a tour of Paris and they share a first kiss. While scheming his return to power, the King finds a Baron who can bankroll his army. But the Baron will only do it if Lisa marries him. Lisa wants to marry Oliver, and believing he may be rich, the King agrees to talk to him. Lisa mentions to Oliver that her father wants to talk to him about the marriage. Oliver thinks that Lisa and the King just want to scam him out of some money and he leaves. Oliver later finds out that Lisa really is a Princess. They find out he is a penniless American, but in the end, Lisa gets to marry Oliver.
149	5	"Oliver Goes Broke"	Richard L. Bare	Jay Sommers & Dick Chevillat	October 20, 1970	150
Lori is going back to New York and she wishes she could stay with Lisa. Oliver has to go to Sam's store to cash a check to pay for Lori's plane ticket. Lori says goodbye to Sam. Sam sets off an alarm when he tries to get money out of his safe for Oliver. Lisa, Oliver and Eb say goodbye to Lori at the airport. The next morning Lisa tells Oliver how much she misses Lori and how she now has no purpose in life. Lisa wants to get a job to fill her days. Lisa tries to get a job at Drucker's store and tells Sam the various things she can do. Hank comes by and Lisa tells Sam that she will wait on him. Hank is confused and assumes she needs a job because Oliver has gone broke. Sam tells Lisa he is sorry but he does not need any help. Soon, everyone is convinced Oliver has squandered all his money. Oliver suggests that Lisa volunteer at the County Welfare Office. Haney spots her in line and assumes she is there for the free soup. Lisa comes home and says she did not get a job but the Welfare people gave her an old jacket for Oliver. Fred comes by, and after seeing Lisa and Oliver with the old jacket, he also believes Oliver is broke. Sam learns from the bank that the check Oliver gave him bounced. Eb pawns Oliver's watch and car for cash and the locals bring food. Oliver appreciates what the people have done, but explains to everyone that he has money. Oliver learns that Sam forgot to mail a deposit of Oliver's to the bank. Dave Willock as Ticket Agent.
150	6	"The Great Mayoralty Campaign"	Richard L. Bare	Jay Sommers & Dick Chevillat	October 27, 1970	156
Sam decides that after being mayor for 37 years, he does not want to do it anymore. Sam, Haney, Fred and Hank draft Oliver to run for mayor. At the Ziffel house, and believing that Sam is still running, Ralph and Doris decide to run Lisa for mayor. Oliver and Lisa now realize they will be running against each other. Oliver thinks that Lisa should withdraw as there is no way she could beat him. Lisa will not withdraw. Lisa tells Eb that if he votes for her, she will make him Chief of Police. Haney and Fred want to improve Oliver's image. This will include him not making long-winded speeches, wearing a "Beatle wig" and have him kissing babies, neither of which Oliver agrees to. The men continually sabotage Lisa's campaign vehicle. The women come up with a few tricks of their own. The newspaper says that Oliver is leading in the polls. While Oliver is speaking to some men voters, Lisa rides by on horseback looking like Lady Godiva. All the men go chasing after her. Oliver cannot believe that Lisa would stoop to something like that. Oliver and his team figure out that Ralph was behind Lisa's stunt. The men want Hank to court her to get her out of the way. Oliver and Lisa's marriage is becoming strained. Not knowing what the other is doing, both Lisa and Oliver withdraw from the race to save their marriage. Hank hides in the Douglas house because Ralph wants to marry him. They decide to run Ralph instead.
151	7	"Eb's Double Trouble"	Richard L. Bare	Jay Sommers & Dick Chevillat	November 10, 1970	148
Eb falls for Carol Kenworthy (Kristin Nelson), the pretty new schoolteacher in town, who he meets at Sam's store. Eb brings Carol home saying she can stay there. Oliver tells Carol they do not have a spare room, but he will help look for a place. Hank comes by. After a confusing conversation, Hank tells Carol that his mother has an extra room. Later, Eb's girlfriend Darlene Wheeler (Judith McConnell) comes by to ask Lisa's advice. Eb asked her to the dance Saturday night and she wants to know if the dress she has is good enough. Darlene really likes Eb. Forgetting he already has a date with Darlene, Eb asks Carol to the dance. When Lisa reminds Eb about Darlene, he panics. Eb tries to figure out a way to break the date with Darlene or juggle both girls that night. Oliver tells Eb to just tell Darlene the truth. Fred and Arnold come by. Fred says that Arnold made two dates for the dance and wants Oliver's advice on what to do. Oliver gives Arnold the same advice he gave Eb. Meanwhile, Eb listens to Haney and tells Darlene that he has a wife in Racine, Wisconsin. Darlene's father (Robert Foulk), angry over this news, punches Oliver in the nose. Eb then learns that Carol has a boyfriend that is coming to town and he is taking her to the dance. Lisa tells Eb to apologize to Darlene. When Eb goes to see her, Darlene follows some advice she got from Lisa and Eb may be getting married.
152	8	"Apple-Picking Time"	Richard L. Bare	Jay Sommers & Dick Chevillat	November 17, 1970	151
Lisa wants to learn how to drive. Mr. Collins (John Wheeler) comes by. It is the first time in four years that Collins wants to buy Oliver's apple crop. He will need them delivered in two weeks. Oliver was about to go to Sam's store to buy bushels for the apples. Haney comes by and tries to sell Oliver his bushels, but Oliver chases him away. Oliver orders his bushels from Sam. Oliver asks Hank to find him some apple pickers and the usual confusion ensues. Lisa wants a driving lesson, but Oliver needs to go to Pixley to arrange for a truck to haul his apples. While Oliver is driving, Lisa keeps asking him questions about the car. To keep her quiet, Oliver lets Lisa drive. She runs into the Sheriff's (Joe Higgins) car. The Sheriff asks about Lisa's license or learner's permit. The Sheriff takes away Oliver's expired license. Hank informs Oliver that he could not get any apple pickers. Oliver gets all the farmers to help each other pick their crops. When it comes time to pick Oliver's apples, no one shows up to help. Oliver and Eb are left to pick the apples. Thanks to Lisa's bad driving, Oliver comes up with a way to get his apples picked. Oliver made a lot of money with his apples, but wound up losing money after paying for car repairs and traffic fines. Lisa decides to give up driving. Alan Baxter as Deputy Sheriff.
153	9	"Enterprising Eb"	Richard L. Bare	Jay Sommers & Dick Chevillat	November 24, 1970	152
Eb informs Oliver and Lisa that they are invited to dinner with Eb's future in-laws, the Wheelers. Eb asks Oliver to make a good impression. Oliver does not want to go, but then he hears about to good food that will be served. Lisa, Oliver and Eb arrive at the Wheeler home. Lisa goes to help Mrs. Wheeler (Mona Bruns) with the dinner. Mr. Wheeler keeps accusing Oliver of being an alcoholic. After dinner, Oliver and Wheeler discuss Eb and Darlene's marriage. Wheeler mentions that Eb said Oliver was giving him 40 acres and building him a house. The next day Oliver gives Eb two acres of land so he can build a house for himself and Darlene. Eb shows Darlene the land he picked out. Eb does not have enough money to build a house. Eb wants to borrow the money from Oliver, but Oliver says he has to save up the money himself. Oliver learns that Eb tried to borrow the money from Sam and others in the valley. Eb is smart enough to not borrow the money from Haney. Oliver learns from Hank that Eb has $2000. Eb sold his two acres to a Mr. Dooley, who will use it as a trash dump. But people start dumping their garbage in front of Oliver's house. Oliver tells Eb to give the money back. Eb then rents his land as a trailer camp. He also rents out the Douglas house as a honeymoon getaway and the barn as a horse stable. Al Molinaro as Joe. William Bakewell as Man.
154	10	"Oliver's Double"	Richard L. Bare	Dan Beaumont	December 1, 1970	153
An embezzler named Charlie Foster, who is a dead ringer for Oliver, hides out in Pixley with his wife Blanche (Chanin Hale). Eb spots Charlie kissing Blanche and assumes it is Oliver cheating on Lisa. The next morning, Eb makes a lot of snide remarks to Oliver. Meanwhile, Charlie tells Blanche they have to stay in Pixley until "things cool off". Haney tries to sell Oliver an ugly painting by Pablum Picarasso. Lisa claims she has heard of the artist. Oliver is not interested. Hank comes by and has a confusing conversation about Oliver's broken fuel pump. While in Pixley, Haney and Hank each also see Charlie with Blanche and call him Mr. Douglas. Haney now tries to blackmail Oliver into buying the painting. Charlie wonders about the two men who called him Mr. Douglas. Charlie sends Blanche to see if Oliver really looks like him. Eb is upset when he sees Blanche talking with Oliver. Eb says he saw Oliver kissing Blanche, which Oliver denies. Hank comes by and says he saw Oliver at the Pixley hotel. He says he has never been there. Oliver takes Lisa to the hotel to find out what is going on. The Motel Clerk (Hal Smith) calls Oliver Mr. Foster. Lisa now thinks Oliver is lying. Charlie sets it up so Lt. Olson (William Sylvester) from the Boston police comes and arrests Oliver. Thanks to Sam, Charlie is also arrested. At the police station, Oliver finds a way to prove who he is.
155	11	"The High Cost of Loving"	Richard L. Bare	Jay Sommers & Dick Chevillat	December 8, 1970	154
Eb asks Oliver's advice on buying furniture for his future home with Darlene. Eb comes back from Pixley all upset. Apparently he needs a lot more money than he thought he would to get married. Oliver says he cannot afford to pay him more. Oliver suggests he finds a better paying profession. Eb decides to take an accounting class through a correspondence school. Oliver goes to Sam's store to mail the letter to the school. Sam tells Oliver that he took a course from the same school. When Oliver gets home, Haney is there. Haney is upset that Eb did not use his correspondence school. Due to a clerical error, Eb is instead enrolled in an acting course. Eb now believes that fate wants him to be an actor. Things do not go well when Eb attempts to put on theatrical makeup. Hank comes by and tells Oliver in a confusing way that he went to the same school. Eb practices acting all day long and Oliver is getting tired of it. Darlene complains to Oliver and Lisa about Eb and his acting. Darlene says she will break off the engagement if he does not stop. Oliver offers to buy five rooms of furniture for Eb if he quits acting. Eb refuses.
156	12	"The Liberation Movement"	Richard L. Bare	Dick Chevillat & Dan Beaumont	December 15, 1970	155
Lisa is going to a Women's Lib Movement meeting. Oliver tells Eb that he wants to build a tool shed. The location where Oliver wants to put the shed is full of junk. Hank comes by. He was to bring Oliver plans for the shed. Things get confusing, but Oliver gets the plans. Hank tells Oliver that he will need a permit for the shed. Lisa comes back from the meeting. She tells Oliver that men want to keep women from having equal rights. She says that a couple should trade chores every once in while. Oliver tells her that women have it easy and could not possibly do the hard labor that men do. Lisa says she is ready to do some work around the farm and she wants Oliver to do the house work. Oliver says he has to go to Pixley to get a permit first. In Pixley, Oliver tries to get the permit from a Clerk (Jonathan Hole). Due to some issues, Oliver does not get the permit. When he gets home, Oliver is surprised to see that Lisa moved all the junk where the shed will be. Lisa manages to get the permit. Oliver is having some drinks with Sam. Oliver tells Sam that there is no way Lisa could build the tool shed. But when he goes home, Lisa has built one. Oliver finds out from Haney that Lisa paid someone to do all those things. Lisa decides she likes things the way they used to be.
157	13	"Charlie, Homer and Natasha"	Richard L. Bare	Jay Sommers & Dick Chevillat	December 22, 1970	157
Lisa is upset when Oliver refuses to take her to New York for a big party. Meanwhile, Eb has begun talking to his new little invisible friend Charlie. Eb asks Oliver if Charlie can stay with him in the barn. Hank comes by and Eb tries to introduce Charlie to him. Hank tells Oliver he did not see anyone. Oliver pranks Hank by claiming to see Charlie. Haney comes by and claims to bring a suit for Charlie from the cleaners. Oliver asks Eb why he is pretending there is a Charlie. Lisa now says she has a little friend named Natasha. Eb comes by with Charlie and Eb claims to see Natasha. Oliver makes up his own friend, Homer, just to spite the other two. Oliver goes to Sam's store and Sam has a bunch of food that Lisa ordered for their guests. Oliver tells Sam that they are imaginary. When Oliver gets home, Eb is playing with an invisible dog named George. Oliver is really starting to worry about Eb. When Lisa suggests that Eb see a psychiatrist in New York, Oliver realizes the whole thing was a plot to go to the party. Before he knew that Oliver figured things out, Eb called the Sheriff (Bob Hastings) about a fight between the imaginary people. While trying to explain everything to the Sheriff, Oliver is the one who ends up looking screwy. The Sheriff says he will not arrest Oliver if he agrees to go to New York to see the psychiatrist. As they are leaving the house to go to New York, Oliver hears the voices of Charlie, Homer and Natasha.
158	14	"The Engagement Ring"	Richard L. Bare	Dick Chevillat & Dan Beaumont	December 29, 1970	158
Eb is all dressed up. He tells Oliver and Lisa that he is going to propose to Darlene. Eb says he does not want to get married, he just wants to get engaged. Eb and Darlene are sitting on her front porch. He asks her if she would like to get engaged and she says yes. Eb presents her with a watch fob instead of a ring. He is about to kiss Darlene when Mr. Wheeler stops them. Mr. Wheeler tells Eb he cannot get engaged to Darlene with a watch fob. The next morning Eb tells Oliver and Lisa what happened. Oliver goes to Sam's store and Mr. Wheeler shows up. Wheeler tells off Oliver and calls him cheap. Lisa tells Eb how many times she was engaged. Lisa lets Eb have the $2000 ring Oliver gave her during their engagement. Mr. Wheeler has the ring appraised and learns that it is worth only $8. Oliver insists he paid $2000. Wheeler once again calls off the engagement. Hank comes by to see the ring and a confusing conversation ensues. Later, Haney comes by and offers Eb an elopement service, but Oliver chases him away. Lisa goes to have a talk with Mr. Wheeler. When she questions the value of his dowry, he decides the watch fob is now acceptable.
159	15	"The Free Paint Job"	Richard L. Bare	Jay Sommers & Dick Chevillat	January 5, 1971	159
Lisa is trying to find a special dish she can cook for Oliver's birthday, which is three weeks away. Lisa comes up with some crazy recipes from her Hungarian cookbook. Oliver suggests spaghetti and meatballs, so Lisa starts practicing to cook it. No matter how many times she tries, Lisa cannot cook the spaghetti correctly. Mr. Luster (Tom Lowell), from the Luster Paint Company, comes to the house and is greeted by Arnold. Lisa asks Luster if he knows how to cook spaghetti and brings him in the house. Oliver is at Sam's store because Lisa ordered a lot of spaghetti. Sam tells Oliver that Mr. Luster was looking for him. Oliver comes home and meets Mr. Luster. Arnold is still there and eats a banana. Oliver slips on the banana peel. Luster explains that the company offers to paint the Douglas house for free, so they can take "before and after" photos for advertising. The Photographer (David Ketchum) is trying to take a picture of the house when Hank comes by and bothers him. Lisa wants the paint color to match one of her dresses. Oliver has to go to Pixley to get the dress from Mr. Malone (Robert Nichols), the dry cleaner. As quickly as they apply the paint to the house, the porous wood absorbs it. Haney comes by and explains what kind of wood the house is made of. Mr. Luster takes a piece of the wood back to his company to see if they can close the wood's pores. They manage to close the pores, but then the wood gasps for breath. Oliver and Lisa go to an Italian restaurant. Their spaghetti and meatballs looks just like Lisa's at home.
160	16	"Son of Drobny"	Richard L. Bare	Dan Beaumont	January 12, 1971	160
Lisa gets a letter from her uncle in Budapest saying he is sending them a wedding present. The present arrives and it is a duck who is the son of Drobny. Lisa tells Oliver that her and Drobny were in the Hungarian underground during WWII. Lisa recalls how the Germans were closing in on the Underground's hideout. She manages to get the Germans all in the attic. Then she has Drobny get a message to General de Gaulle, who rescues them. Meanwhile, Sam and Haney are trying to think of a way to get people into town to perk up business. Hank comes by and makes things confusing. Eb tells them that the son of a Hungarian war hero is staying with Lisa and Oliver. The town now plans to have a big celebration for the hero. Oliver tries to tell the Chamber of Commerce that their guest of honor is just a duck, but no one listens. The Lt. Governor (Parley Baer) arrives for the celebration. Everyone is surprised when he actually recognizes the duck as the son of Drobny and knows of Lisa being in the Hungarian underground. Later, Eb shows Oliver the big write up of the celebration in the paper. Oliver also reads that duck season opens today and he sends Drobny out to the woods. Lisa makes Oliver go out to find Drobny. Lisa then finds Drobny in the house. Oliver and Eb come back all wet from a rain storm. It rains for 12 days and the town is flooded. The water finally recedes and it has been three weeks since Lisa last saw Drobny. Drobny finally comes back and he has a message from the French underground. Gordon Connell as Gorko. Michael Keenan as 3rd German.
161	17	"The Wedding Deal"	Richard L. Bare	Dick Chevillat & Dan Beaumont	January 19, 1971	164
Eb tells Lisa and Oliver that he will be married in two weeks. Later, Lisa wonders where the couple will live. Oliver says that Eb likes an apartment in Pixley. Eb tells them they decided against Pixley and they will live here at the Douglas home. Eb and Darlene still do not have a location for their wedding. Lisa serves Oliver a chicken that beeps when it is done. Sam tells Lisa and Oliver there is a wedding chapel at the drive-in movie. Lisa tries to figure out what to get as a wedding present. Haney suggests having the wedding for free at a car wash in Pixley. Darlene says no as she wants a church wedding. Hank tells Lisa and Oliver that he just heard about the wedding. A confusing conversation ensues. Haney then convinces Eb to have their ceremony on TV in a furniture emporium's window. The wedding comes with two rooms of furniture. Oliver says he better check with Darlene. This time, Darlene's father says no to the idea. Mr. Wheeler tells Oliver the wedding will be in church or not at all. Haney tells Oliver that Eb has to go through with the window wedding as he signed a contract. To keep from being sued by the store, Lisa and Oliver fill in as bride and groom. Jane Connell as woman organist.
162	18	"Star Witness"	Richard L. Bare	Dick Chevillat & Dan Beaumont	January 26, 1971	163
Lisa informs Oliver that Arnold will be staying with them for a few days. The Ziffels have the flu. Oliver is not happy. Oliver and Lisa are going shopping in Pixley and Arnold goes with. Arnold waits in the car while Oliver and Lisa go in the store. Arnold witnesses two men robbing the bank. Arnold tries to tell the bank guard what he saw, but he loses his voice. Back at home Oliver sees in the paper that there is a reward for the capture of the crooks. Arnold gets his voice back. But when Oliver says he is not taking him to the Sheriff (Hal Smith), Arnold loses it again. Hank comes by and has a confusing conversation with Oliver about being made a deputy. Hank is looking for the crooks. He goes to Sam's store. Danny (Milton Selzer), one of the crooks, learns from Hank that Arnold saw them. Danny and Charlie (Al Lewis) think that Eb is Arnold and take him away. Arnold follows the crooks. The Sheriff comes by looking for Hank. Meanwhile, Eb tries to tell the crooks that he is not Arnold. Arnold leads Lisa and Oliver to where the crooks have Eb. Arnold helps them capture the crooks.
163	19	"The Spot Remover"	Richard L. Bare	Dan Beaumont	February 2, 1971	166
Doris Ziffel (Fran Ryan) is visiting Lisa. Oliver shows Lisa a stain on his jacket that the cleaners could not remove. Lisa's Uncle Boris sent her a miracle cleaning fluid. Oliver and Doris are amazed when the stain is removed. Doris brings some of the fluid home and removes a spot on the carpet. Fred is amazed. Meanwhile, Sam gets a new toupee and Hank thinks it is an animal and tries to kill it. The toupee winds up in the pickle barrel and turns green. Fred tells Sam about the cleaning fluid. Sam visits Lisa and his toupee is returned to its original color. Haney gets a sample, hoping to have it analyzed, and find out the formula. Haney brings the fluid to Bert Beamish (Benny Baker), a pharmacist. Mr. Wilkins (George Ives), a household chemicals salesman, comes by Sam's store. Sam tells him about the cleaning fluid. Bert analyzes the spot remover and tells Haney that it is cabbage soup. Mr. Wilkins talks to Oliver and Lisa about possibly selling the spot remover. Lisa puts stains on Wilkins' jacket to prove the fluid works. But, then she realizes she does not have any left. Lisa learns from Haney what the fluid was made from. There is some confusion when Oliver takes Wilkins' suit to the cleaners in Pixley. In the end, however, anything the cleaning fluid touched burns away.
164	20	"King Oliver I"	Richard L. Bare	Jay Sommers & Dick Chevillat	February 9, 1971	170
Oliver tells Lisa that the Governor is to give a speech about the state budget at noon. Oliver and Lisa go to Sam's store to watch the speech. Sam is using Hank as an aerial for the TV. Gov. Carstairs (Lyle Talbot) declares the state bankrupt, raises taxes by 52% and shuts down most state services. Back at home, Oliver wants to write a letter to Carstairs. Eb says he is wasting his time. Hank comes by riding a jackass because the state took away his car and they are closing his office. Hank tells Oliver he has been fired. At a Hooterville protest meeting, Lisa tells the story of how her father the king responded to a tax increase by seceding from the union. Oliver thinks things are getting ridiculous and leaves. The next morning Eb tells Oliver there is a story about him in the paper. Arnold comes by with the paper. The article says that they decided to secede from the state, blow up the bridge across Simpson's Swamp and form their own kingdom. They also anointed Oliver as King Oliver I. Carstairs sees the paper. The men at Sam's store are discussing Oliver's coronation. Carstairs gets a call from the President and is told to straighten things out. Carstairs goes to speak with Oliver and tells him the trouble he is causing. Lisa has a suggestion for how to raise money for the state and Carstairs loves it. William Sylvester as Aide to the Governor.
165	21	"A Girl for Drobny"	Richard L. Bare	Dick Chevillat & Dan Beaumont	February 16, 1971	167
Drobny the duck is beginning to show signs of homesickness and is not eating. Oliver says they could send him back to Hungary, but Lisa says he was a gift. Meanwhile, Oliver is trying to work on his state taxes but is constantly interrupted by Drobny and others. Arnold comes by to play with Drobny, but there is a language barrier. Eb brings Drobny a paddle ball toy as a present. The ball winds up in Oliver's coffee and spills on his tax form. Lisa decides Drobny needs a girlfriend. Oliver wants to go to Sam's store to get another tax form. Lisa takes Drobny with. To get some quiet, Oliver works on his tax form in the barn. Hank comes by to give Eleanor the cow a check up. Hank and Oliver have a confusing conversation. Lisa tells Oliver that Drobny is missing. Eb finds him trying to hitch a ride to Budapest. Haney comes by with a female duck named Gertrude for Drobny. Gertrude speaks Hungarian. Haney wants $600 for the duck, but takes $20. They get married and 5 weeks later they have children.
166	22	"The Carpenter's Ball"	Richard L. Bare	Dick Chevillat & Dan Beaumont	February 23, 1971	162
Lisa wants to go to Hooterville's annual Carpenter's Ball, but Oliver is not interested. Back at the house, Eb is practicing for the nail driving contest held at the Ball. Eb is taking Darlene to the Ball. Ralph comes by. Ralph wants Hank to ask her. Lisa tells her to drop some hints. Hank comes up with silly excuses to not go when Ralph mentions the Ball. Lisa schemes to get Ralph and Hank together by asking Hank to be her date to the Ball. Soon the Hooterville gossips have the Douglas' marriage on the rocks. Haney tells Sam and Fred that going to the Ball is just a cover story. Lisa and Hank are actually flying off to Acapulco. Haney offers Oliver his "Marriage Salvage Service". To make Lisa jealous, Haney wants to have Oliver take Ingrid (Myrna Hansen), a Norwegian girl, to the Ball. Ingrid was smuggled over in a shipment of kippered herring. Oliver does not go for the idea. Oliver tells Lisa about the rumors. Things get out of hand with Ralph mad at Oliver and Hank getting fired all because of the rumor. Lisa gets upset when she hears about Ingrid. Oliver decides the only way to stop the rumors is to attend the ball with Lisa. Hank and Ralph come by and want to double date with Oliver and Lisa. Oliver hurts his thumb during the nail driving contest, but he comes in third in the beauty contest.
167	23	"The Hole in the Porch"	Richard L. Bare	Dick Chevillat & Dan Beaumont	March 2, 1971	168
Oliver is making some repairs around the house. He is working on a leak in the kitchen sink. Eb tells him that the dry-rotted front porch needs work. But before Oliver can fix it, Hank falls through and sprains his ankle. Oliver leaves for Sam's to get an ice bag. Meanwhile, Fred and Arnold are at Sam's. Arnold wants some after shave lotion to attract the ladies. Oliver arrives and tells them about Hank. Lisa moves Hank into their bedroom to recuperate. She bandages his ankle, but she left the shoe on. Hank blows non-stop on his kazoo whenever he wants something. Ralph comes by and puts on a nurse's uniform to care for her "Hankie". Haney, acting as Hank's lawyer, tries to soak Oliver with a $50,000 lawsuit. Oliver kicks Haney out. Ralph wants Hank to spend the night. Oliver and Lisa sleep in the barn. When they wake up, Hank is there with them. He crawled there because he did not want to spend the night alone. Local farmers bring their livestock into the bedroom for Kimball's animal clinic. Oliver finally storms out in search of a saloon, but falls through the porch and sprains his ankle. Now Oliver and Hank have to recuperate together. Foster Brooks as Farmer #1. Patrick Cranshaw as Farmer #2.
168	24	"Lisa the Psychologist"	Richard L. Bare	Dick Chevillat & Dan Beaumont	March 9, 1971	161
Oliver takes a night course in organic farming at the state college. Lisa takes a psychology class because it falls on the same nights as Oliver's classes. In her first class, Lisa begins to annoy Dr. Hoffman (William Sylvester), the teacher. Back at home, Oliver is surprised at how fast Lisa read through one of her text books. Meanwhile, Eb does not feel like working because he and Darlene had a fight and she is not talking to him. Eb mentions to Oliver that Lisa has read through several more books. He makes fun of Oliver for still being on his first book. Lisa helps Eb with his problem with Darlene. Hank comes by and thinks Oliver is the one taking the psychology class. He thinks Oliver cured him of his problem. Lisa's advice did help Eb get Darlene to talk to him again. Fred comes by with Arnold wanting to see "Doctor Lisa". Arnold has been depressed lately. Haney tries to sell Oliver a couch for psychiatrist Lisa. When Oliver goes in the house, Sam is being treated by Lisa. On Arnold's recommendation, Eb brings over Henry the goat, who thinks he is a duck. Oliver kicks them out. Even though her advice is helping people, Oliver wants her to stop before she gets in trouble. William Lanteau as Registrar. Note: This episode marks the final appearances of Sam Drucker, Fred Ziffel, Hank Kimble, Mr. Haney, and Eb.
169	25	"Hawaiian Honeymoon"	Vincent Sherman	Jay Sommers	March 16, 1971	165
Lisa cons Oliver into taking a fifth honeymoon together, this time to the Moana Rexford Hotel in Hawaii. Meanwhile, hotel owner Bob Carter (Don Porter) discusses business with his daughter Pamela (Pamela Franklin). Business has been down and Pam makes a few suggestions to help. Bob is not interested in her modern ideas. Bob gets a telegram from Lisa requesting a reservation. Pamela's friends, Richard and Lily, are to be married. Pamela sets them up in the honeymoon suite at the hotel at no cost. On the plane, Oliver recognizes the pilot as Jack Skylar (William Sylvester). They flew together in the war. That evening the Justice of the Peace (John Wheeler) marries Richard and Lily. When Lisa and Oliver arrive, and not knowing what Pam did, Bob shows them the honeymoon suite. Pamela is surprised when Bob shows up at the suite with Lisa and Oliver. Since the suite has two bedrooms, at first the two couples do not run into each other. But things do get confusing when Oliver orders room service and it gets delivered to Richard and Lily. After the two couples finally meet, Pamela explains to them what happened. Oliver says Richard and Lily can share the suite with them. The next day, Bob tells Pamela that she is lucky the Douglases did not make any trouble. Pat Morita as Charlie Lee. Shirley Mitchell as Marla Grayson. Jane Connell as 'Woman on the plane'. Note: This was actually a backdoor pilot episode for a proposed series (Pam) that did not sell.
170	26	"The Ex-Secretary"	Bruce Bilson	Jay Sommers	April 27, 1971	169
Oliver writes a letter to Carol Rush (Elaine Joyce), his one-time secretary in New York. He would like to find out where she had had his father's watch repaired years earlier. Carol now works for Mr. Oglethorpe (Richard Deacon), a domineering California realtor. Carol is a bit of a scatterbrain. She lives with her sister Lillian (Emmaline Henry) and her husband, Harry Grant (Cliff Norton). The only reason Oglethorpe keeps Carol around is because she is his wife's cousin. Oglethorpe hopes to get in on a big land deal with Lawrence David (Larry D. Mann), who should be arriving soon. A man comes to the office and Carol thinks he is Lawrence. He turns out to be Mark Allan (George Furth), who is interested in an office that Oglethorpe has to rent. Lawrence arrives and Carol thinks she has seen him before. Carol keeps trying to remember who the jeweler was that Oliver is interested in. Oliver calls Carol, but things get confusing when Oglethorpe wants her to get off the phone. Oglethorpe has Carol make out a check for Lawrence. After speaking with Oliver again, Carol believes that Oglethorpe is dealing with a crook and needs to get his check back. Carol goes to Lawrence's hotel room to look for the check. Lawrence keeps trying to get romantic with Carol. In the end, she prevents Oglethorpe from being conned by Lawrence, a man that Oliver had tried to indict back in New York. Anthony Caruso as Studs. Joe E. Tata as Bellboy. Note: This was a pilot episode for another proposed series (Carol) that CBS also passed on.

=== TV movie (1990) ===
Title	Directed by	Written by	Original release date	U.S. viewers (millions)
Return to Green Acres	William Asher	Craig Heller and Guy Shulman	May 18, 1990	11.8

== See also ==
- List of Petticoat Junction episodes
- List of The Beverly Hillbillies episodes
