= Return to Green Acres =

1990 American television comedy film

- Genre: Comedy
- Based on: Green Acres by Jay Sommers
- Written by: Craig Heller; Guy Shulman
- Directed by: William Asher
- Starring: Eddie Albert; Eva Gabor; Alvy Moore; Mary Grace Canfield; Sid Melton; Tom Lester; Frank Cady; Pat Buttram
- Composer: Dan Foliart
- Country of origin: United States
- Original language: English

Production
- Executive producer: Jerry Golod
- Producer: Anthony Santa Croce
- Cinematography: Karen Grossman
- Editors: Gary Griffin; Michael Renaud
- Running time: 92 minutes
- Production companies: JayGee Productions; Arnold Productions; Orion Television Entertainment

Original release
- Network: CBS
- Release: May 18, 1990

Return to Green Acres is a 1990 American made-for-television comedy film directed by William Asher. The film is a continuation of the CBS sitcom Green Acres, which aired from 1965 to 1971. Eddie Albert and Eva Gabor reprise their roles from the series as Oliver Wendell Douglas and Lisa Douglas, alongside much of the original series' supporting cast. The film premiered on CBS on May 18, 1990.

== Plot ==
It has been some thirty years since the events of the show. Fred and Doris Ziffel are deceased, but their estate and pig Arnold are currently being looked after by their young niece Daisy, who is having no luck finding a man in Hooterville. Mr. Haney has been doing business with East Germany after the fall of the Berlin Wall. Oliver Wendell Douglas discovers that alfalfa he bought from Haney was actually poison ivy. Oliver's wife Lisa has taken up painting and struggles to sell her artwork. Eb Dawson is married to a woman named Flo, and they have six children. Flo is expecting twins. Jeb, the eldest of the Dawson children, is something of a teenage rebel as he dreams of leaving Hooterville for a more exciting life.

Meanwhile, developer E. Mitchell Armstrong wants to build an industrial area in Hooterville. Armstrong needs to get the residents to sell their property, and teams up with Haney. Oliver and Lisa decide to give up their rural life in Hooterville and move back to New York City. The town holds a farewell party for them. At the party, Daisy sees Armstrong's son Brad, and the two are smitten with each other. Later, Haney tells Brad that he has acquired all the deeds in Hooterville. None of the residents know the others have sold.

In New York City, Lisa gets together with some old friends, while Oliver goes to his law firm, where is he displeased by some of the methods they now use. Brad decides to ask Daisy out, and confesses that Hooterville will be torn down and developed into an industrial area. Daisy now wants nothing to do with him. When the townspeople realize what is happening, some of the residents travel to New York and appeal to Oliver, who agrees to help them. They go to meet Armstrong, who lies and says he will give them their deeds back.

Arnold accidentally gets into a cab and is later picked up by a man who works at a restaurant. The townspeople find Arnold before he gets cooked. Eb learns from his son that Hooterville is full of construction crews and Armstrong lied to them. The residents stop the crews from working, but Armstrong shows up with a SWAT team. Oliver and Lisa get put in jail. Brad and Daisy start falling for each other again, and Brad says he will not let Hooterville be torn down. He finds a way to get Oliver and Lisa out of jail. Brad proposes to Daisy and she accepts. The residents get Armstrong to believe that Hooterville is earthquake prone, and he cancels the project. Lisa tells Oliver that she wants to stay in Hooterville.

== Cast ==
- Eddie Albert as Oliver Wendell Douglas
- Eva Gabor as Lisa Douglas
- Alvy Moore as Hank Kimball
- Mary Grace Canfield as Ralph Monroe
- Sid Melton as Alf Monroe
- Tom Lester as Eb Dawson
- Frank Cady as Sam Drucker
- Pat Buttram as Mr. Haney
- John Scott Clough as Brad Armstrong
- Mary Tanner Bailey as Daisy Ziffel
- Henry Gibson as E. Mitchell Armstrong
- Mark Ballou as Jeb
- Lucy Lee Flippin as Flo
- John Asher as Chill
- Jeff Rochlin as Lester
- Lycia Naff as B.B.
- John Alvin as E. Wilfred
- Tom Simmons as Sheriff Bedford
- Sally Kemp as Ruthie
- Tippi Hedren as Arleen

== Production ==
The film's working title was The Return of Green Acres. Script issues led to Eddie Albert briefly exiting the project before production began. Alvy Moore, who played Hank Kimball in the series, said "We slipped back into it very easily, you know, you see the people and say 'Hi,' as if it were yesterday." Three stand-ins for Arnold the pig were used during filming.

Most of the show's principal cast returned, including Moore, Mary Grace Canfield, Sid Melton, Tom Lester, Frank Cady and Pat Buttram. The film was Cady's final acting role before his death in 2012. Hank Patterson and Barbara Pepper, who played Fred and Doris Ziffel in the series, had died before Return to Grass Acres was produced. Their characters were acknowledged to have passed away in the film.

== Broadcast and reception ==
Return to Green Acres premiered on CBS on May 18, 1990. The film's original broadcast received a Nielsen rating of 11.8, winning its time slot, and placed 35th out of 64 programs for the week of May 14-20, 1990.

Robert Bianco of The Pittsburgh Press wrote that the film was "about 90 minutes too long", but called it "a pleasant enough diversion". Jon Burlingame wrote, ""Green Acres" fans will be unhappy. It's not the laugh track, or even the disappointingly marginal involvement of Arnold Ziffel[...] it's the dull dialogue and painfully slow pace that ruin "Return to Green Acres."" Ron Weiskind of the Pittsburgh Post-Gazette criticized the film's focus on sentimentality. Both Burlingame and Weiskind criticized the movie's characterization of Mr. Haney as straying too far from the series.

In 1993, Albert called the film "just ghastly" and said, "The writers didn't have the faintest idea of what this story was about. They just killed it."
