= Gordy =

- Canadian theatrical release poster
- Directed by: Mark Lewis
- Screenplay by: Leslie Stevens
- Story by: Jay Sommers; Dick Chevillat
- Produced by: Sybil Robson Orr; Leslie Stevens; Frederic W. Brost
- Starring: Doug Stone; Tom Lester
- Cinematography: Richard Michalak
- Edited by: Lindsay Frazer; Duane Hartzell
- Music by: Charles Fox
- Production companies: RAS Entertainment Ltd.; Robson Entertainment
- Distributed by: Miramax Family Films
- Release dates: November 4, 1994 (Tucson, Arizona); May 12, 1995 (nationwide)
- Running time: 90 minutes
- Country: United States
- Language: English
- Budget: $6–7 million
- Box office: $3.9 million

Gordy is a 1994 American family comedy drama film directed by Mark Lewis, about a livestock piglet named Gordy who searches for his missing family (who are taken away to a slaughterhouse in Omaha, Nebraska). He experiences the lives of others who are part of the film's side plots, including traveling country music singers Luke McAllister and his daughter, Jinnie Sue; and lonely boy Hanky Royce whose mother, Jessica, is engaged to a sinister businessman named Gilbert Sipes. Gordy changes lives for the people he encounters due to their ability to understand him. The film was distributed by Miramax Family Films.

The film features the song "Pig Power in the House" by Tag Team. A music video was produced for the song, featuring clips from the film.

== Plot ==
A piglet named Gordy lives on Meadow Brook Farm near Hope, Arkansas. However, after the farmer goes bankrupt, he is forced to sell everything, starting with Gordy's family. Gordy tries to stop his father from leaving by following the truck taking him, but he tells Gordy to go home and look after the family. Returning to the farm, Gordy finds that his mother and siblings were taken in another truck while he pursued his father. Determined to locate his family and return to the farm, Gordy sets out to find them. He soon ends up in the care of Jinnie Sue McAllister, a young country singer who lives in a camper van with her father, Luke, and their "manager", Cousin Jake.

They travel to a dinner party, where Luke performs for the governor of Arkansas. Also attending are rich businessman Henry Royce, his daughter Jessica, her scheming fiancé Gilbert Sipes, and her lonely young son Hanky. Hanky wanders off and meets Gordy and Jinnie Sue. Hanky falls into the swimming pool but cannot swim. Just as Jinnie Sue rushes off to get help, Gordy dives into the pool with an inflatable tube and saves Hanky. Due to Gordy's bravery, he is given to Hanky as a pet and becomes famous.

Henry and Gilbert have conflicting opinions on who the new mascot of the Royce Company should be: Gordy or Jessica. Gordy wins, due to a switched camera lens used on Jessica's promotion. Gilbert is determined to remove Gordy and take control of the company. He sends his henchmen, Dietz and Krugman, to kidnap Gordy, but Gordy and Hanky escape by boarding a school bus, which Dietz and Krugman pursue. Gordy and Hanky escape onto a feeding truck and unexpectedly meet up with the McAllisters, who learn from the radio that Hanky has apparently run away. Another bulletin follows, revealing Henry has died of a heart attack. The McAllisters return Hanky and Gordy to the Royce building in St. Louis, Missouri, where an attorney reveals that Henry has left his company to Gordy and Hanky.

Cousin Jake, upon learning that Gordy's family is missing, organizes a countrywide search to locate them and also a country music concert in Branson, Missouri in Gordy's name. Jim Stafford, Moe Bandy, Boxcar Willie, Cristy Lane, Buck Trent, and Mickey Gilley perform, as well as a surprise speech from President Bill Clinton (voiced by Jim Meskimen), who unveils a new stamp of Gordy. Gilbert sends Dietz and Krugman to kidnap Gordy, but he is saved by Cousin Jake, who returns him to Hanky and Jinnie Sue. Everyone learns from someone who calls into the telethon that Gordy's family is going to be slaughtered in Nebraska. Gilbert tries to hide the fact that it is owned by the Royce family, causing a brief struggle that ends with Jessica and Luke knocking Gilbert out. Gordy and the others race to stop the slaughterhouse from killing Gordy's family, but a train slows them. Hanky rings the love-struck supervisor, and the slaughterhouse is shut down just in time. To Gordy's happiness, his family has survived, and he is reunited with his father, who was also at the slaughterhouse. The pigs are moved back to the farm, which Luke and Jessica buy; they marry and settle with Cousin Jake, Hanky and Jinnie Sue (now brother and sister). Gordy and his family are finally reunited.

== Cast ==
- Doug Stone as Luke McAllister: A country singer, and the father of Jinnie Sue.
- Kristy Young as Jinnie Sue McAllister: The daughter of Luke, also a country singer.
- Tom Lester as Cousin Jake: Luke's cousin and the manager of his group.
- Deborah Hobart as Jessica Royce: the daughter of Henry and mother of Hanky, engaged to Gilbert.
- Michael Roescher as Hanky Royce: The lonely but friendly son of Jessica. He becomes a good friend to Gordy.
- James Donadio as Gilbert Sipes: The fiancé of Jessica and head of Market Research and director of Public Relations for the Royce company. He is a selfish, classist, and scheming man who is looking to take over it.
- Ted Manson as Henry Royce: The elderly executive of the Royce Company, father of Jessica, and maternal grandfather of Hanky. He dies of a heart attack part-way through the film at age 73.
- Tom Key as Brinks: The comical friendly director of Consumer Research for the Royce Company and also attorney of the Royce family and Gilbert. He usually follows the advice of his conscience.
- Jon Kohler and Afemo Omilami as Dietz and Krugman: Gilbert's incompetent henchmen.

=== Voices ===
- Justin Garms as Gordy: A spunky young piglet who sets out from his home to find his missing family.
- Hamilton Camp as Gordy's Father: An adult pig who was taken up north to be slaughtered. Camp also voices Richard the Rooster, who warns Gordy that his family has been taken away.
- Jocelyn Blue as Gordy's Mother: The mother of Gordy and his five siblings. She and Gordy's siblings are also taken for slaughter.
- Frank Welker as the Narrator and Animals' vocal effects
- Tress MacNeille as Wendy, Richard's mate
- Earl Boen as Minnesota Red
- Frank Soronow as Dorothy the Cow
- Billy Bodine as Piglet
- Blake McIver Ewing as Piglet
- Julianna Harris as Piglet
- Sabrina Weiner as Piglet
- Heather Bahler as Piglet
- Jim Meskimen as the voice of Bill Clinton

== Production ==
The script for Gordy started under the title of Waldo and was written by veteran TV comedy writers Jay Sommers and Dick Chevillat with Arnold the Pig from Green Acres in mind for Waldo, but remained unproduced for several years. In January 1993, it was announced Sybil Robson's newly formed Robson Entertainment had acquired the Waldo script which was re-written by Leslie Stevens with the new title Gordy. Pre-production took place in Atlanta on a budget of $6–7 million.

== Release ==
The film was released on two screens in Tucson, Arizona on November 4, 1994 and was released nationwide on May 12, 1995.

=== Home media ===
The film was released on VHS on November 8, 1995 by Walt Disney Home Video. It was released on DVD on June 4, 2002 by Walt Disney Home Entertainment, along with a simultaneous VHS re-release on the same day. It was re-released on DVD on April 12, 2011 by Echo Bridge Home Entertainment. A second re-release by Lionsgate was released on October 7, 2014, which includes a digital copy. A third re-release by Miramax was released on February 23, 2021 through Paramount Home Entertainment.

== Reception ==
=== Critical reception ===
Along with generally negative reviews, Gordy was eclipsed by Babe, another family film about a talking piglet who becomes famous while avoiding being slaughtered for food. The review aggregator website Rotten Tomatoes reported that the film received a 21% approval rating with an average rating of 4.1/10 based on 19 reviews. Although the film premiered on a limited release in Tucson in November 1994 and had its nationwide release a few months before Babe, Gordy was far less successful critically and commercially. Meanwhile, Babe was both a critical and commercial success, won several awards (including an Academy Award for Visual Effects) and spawned a sequel titled Babe: Pig in the City.

Roger Ebert of the Chicago Sun-Times gave the film 2 out of 4 stars, writing: "This is not the kind of film that rewards deep analysis. I rate it at two stars, but I'd recommend it for kids. I can't recommend it for people like me, but there are many other kinds of people in the world, some of them children who believe that pigs can talk, and for them, Gordy is likely to be very entertaining. You know who you are."

Peter Stack of the San Francisco Chronicle claimed that "Gordy's strongest suit is the piglet's determination to reunite with his family, and that part of the convoluted plot develops into a folksy comic effort as Jinnie Sue, her dad, Hanky and Gordy race to save the family of pigs from becoming sausages. One would think the pork industry would be livid about this film as it portrays pig slaughter as an outrageous evil. The highlight comes when Gordy jumps into a backyard swimming pool—piglets really are cutest when they put their little trotters together and dive—and saves Hanky from drowning. Generally speaking, time would be better spent with Charlotte's Web than this forgettable hogwash."

Chris Hicks of the Deseret News reviewed the film saying that "This may have sounded like a cute idea on paper, but as kids pictures go this is the worst to come along in memory. Charmless, humorless and dull as drying paint, Gordy is the kind of movie parents should save for video punishment. But if they take their kids to a theater, they'll be punishing themselves."

Dave Kehr of the New York Daily News described the film as "a particularly dull and inept family film".

Caryn James of The New York Times opined that "It is possible that some children will be tickled at the very idea of a talking pig, even one as bland as Gordy. They will probably be children who have never seen any movie, ever. Gordy is the film that asks, How you gonna keep them down on the farm after they've seen Simba?"

Rita Kempley of the Washington Post called the film a "peculiar, seemingly pro-vegan tale". She later went on to say that "It's fairly obvious that Gordy's performance was inspired by Arnold Ziffel's precedent-setting work on the old TV series Green Acres. But then so was the movie, which was penned by series alumni Jay Sommers and Dick Chevillat. Their screenplay is as bland as an afternoon in Mister Rogers' Neighborhood, though the director, Australian animal-mockumentary-maker Mark Lewis, adds a touch of menace by using extreme close-ups, bizarre angles and other stylish camera work. One thing's for sure, Gordy will put little pea-pickers off their pork."

Walter V. Addiego of The Examiner Staff stated that "The film tosses a few mild, satirical darts at public relations and advertising, but otherwise it's strictly hokum from the heartland. The director, I'm sorry to say, is Mark Lewis, the Australian responsible for the strange and funny documentary Cane Toads: An Unnatural History, which enlivened the S.F. Film Festival in 1988. Gordy will not enhance his résumé. It's surprisingly amateurish, due in no small part to clumsy scripting by Leslie Stevens."

Tracy Moore of Common Sense Media gave the film two out of five stars, saying that "This fast-moving adventure about a talking pig's mission to find his family has a few fun elements -- some lively country music, a brush with fortune and fame, a bit of suspense, and lots of comically dodged mishaps. Kids will no doubt be entertained by the talking animals, cute pigs, and loads of adventure. Parents, however, should note the parent and child separation and the death of a grandparent as key concerns, as well as the scariness factor of the impending violence of the slaughterhouse, which is teased throughout the movie. If the audience is old enough to handle that potentially squeamish subject, Gordy is otherwise a passable 90 minutes of animal-talking antics." TV Guide gave the film 1½ stars out of four.

However, Louis Black of The Austin Chronicle wrote a favorable review of the film concluding that "A lot happens, it moves quickly, and the film is filled with minor characters who nicely round things out; my young companion watched the film from beginning to end, loving it. This is not a date movie."

=== Box office ===
In its opening week in Tucson, the film grossed $19,000. It went on to gross $3.9 million in the United States and Canada.
