= Alvy Moore =

American actor (1921–1997)

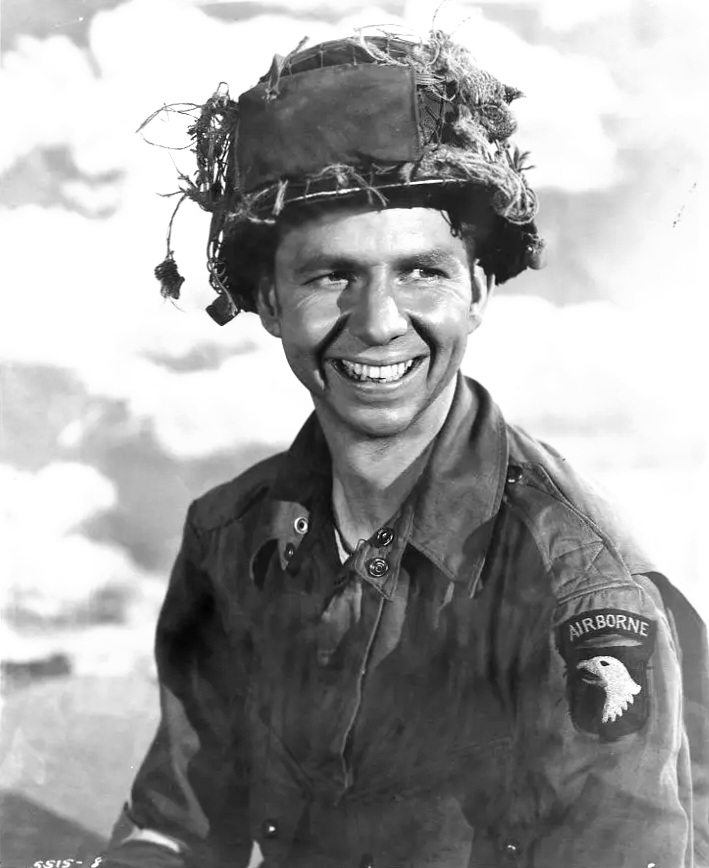
- Moore in Screaming Eagles (1956)
- Born: Jack Alvin Moore; December 5, 1921; Vincennes, Indiana, U.S.
- Died: May 4, 1997 (aged 75); Palm Desert, California, U.S.
- Resting place: Forest Lawn Memorial Park (Hollywood Hills)
- Occupation: Actor
- Years active: 1952–1995
- Spouse: Carolyn Moore (m. 1950)
- Children: 3

Jack Alvin "Alvy" Moore (December 5, 1921 – May 4, 1997) was an American actor best known for his role as scatterbrained county agricultural agent Hank Kimball on the CBS television series Green Acres. His character would often make a statement, only to immediately negate the statement himself and then negate the corrected statement until his stream of statements was interrupted by a frustrated Oliver Wendell Douglas portrayed by Eddie Albert. One such statement was, "Good morning, Mr. Douglas! Well, it's not a good morning ... but it's not a bad morning either!" Moore appeared in 142 of the 170 total Green Acres episodes.

== Early life ==
Alvy Moore was born in Vincennes, Indiana, the son of Indiana natives Roy and Elice Moore. When Alvy was young the family moved to Terre Haute, where Roy was a grocery store manager. Alvy was president of the senior class at Wiley High School in 1940–41. He then attended Indiana State Teachers College—now Indiana State University—both before and after service with the United States Marine Corps during World War II, in which he saw combat in the Battle of Iwo Jima.

== Acting career ==
He became an actor and furthered his training at the Pasadena Playhouse, succeeding David Wayne in the role of Ensign Pulver opposite Henry Fonda's Mister Roberts on Broadway, and later toured with the play for 14 months. He made his screen debut playing the quartermaster in Okinawa (1952).

Moore appeared in guest and supporting roles in a number of movies and television shows, including My Little Margie in 1952, as Dillard Crumbly, an efficiency expert fresh out of Efficiency College, and The Mickey Mouse Club, where he hosted "What I Want to Be" segments as the Roving Reporter. He had a small role as a member of Marlon Brando's motorcycle gang in the 1953 film The Wild One, and a similar bit part the same year as one of the Linda Rosa townspeople in The War of the Worlds. Moore co-starred with Dick Powell and Debbie Reynolds in the 1954 film Susan Slept Here, in which he displayed his natural gift for physical comedy. In 1955, he co-starred with Brian Keith and Kim Novak in 5 Against the House.

In the early 1960s he was cast in the recurring role of Howie in 11 episodes of the CBS sitcom Pete and Gladys, with Harry Morgan and Cara Williams. Moore made a brief appearance as a cab driver in the 1964 Perry Mason episode "The Case of the Wednesday Woman." He also appeared in two episodes of another CBS sitcom, The Dick Van Dyke Show, "The Impractical Joke" posing, for a spoof, as an Internal Revenue Service agent and "The Case Of The Pillow" as a shifty home goods salesman named Mr. Wiley. In 1965 he appeared in an episode of Gomer Pyle, U.S.M.C. ("Old Man Carter"). Also in 1965, he was in the Beverly Hillbillies, Season 3, Episode 1 where Jed Becomes a movie Mogol. He found his niche in television, starring as the incompetent county agent Hank Kimball in Green Acres from 1965 to 1971. He was also a guest star on The Andy Griffith Show and later on Little House on the Prairie. He was an actor, producer, and uncredited scriptwriter for A Boy and His Dog. He attended DisCon II, the 1974 World Science Fiction Convention, to help promote the film. In 1978, Moore appeared as stage coach station master Swenson in three season two episodes of How the West Was Won ("Cattle Drive," "Robbers Roost," and "Gold"). One of Moore's last television appearances was a brief guest shot on the sitcom Frasier.

In the 1980s Moore appeared in many cult horror films, including Scream (1981), Mortuary (1983), They're Playing With Fire (1984), Intruder (1989), and The Horror Show (1989).

== Personal life ==
Moore met Carolyn Mohr in 1947 while both were actors with the Pasadena Playhouse. They married in 1950 and traveled with the national touring company of Mister Roberts before settling in Los Angeles to start their family. The couple had three children: Janet, Alyson, and Barry. Carolyn continued to be involved in acting, doing dinner theater and various church productions.

In his spare time during the 1960s, he umpired Little League baseball in Lake View Terrace and Toluca Lake, California, and played in charity golf tournaments across the country. He was proud of his role of Hank Kimball in Green Acres, and drove a white Chrysler with the license plate "GRNACRS."

== Death ==
Alvy and Carolyn Moore were married 47 years. Alvy died of heart failure on May 4, 1997, at their home in Palm Desert, California. Former Green Acres actor Tom Lester was with him when he died. For over 50 years Carolyn was a member of Beta Sigma Phi, a women's sorority group that raises money for charity. In 2008 she received the "International Award of Distinction," the highest honor the organization bestows on active members. She also was a member and treasurer of the "Motion Picture Mothers" for over 30 years. Carolyn Moore died at age 79 in 2009.

== Filmography ==
=== Film ===
| Year | Title | Role | Notes |
|---|---|---|---|
| 1952 | Okinawa | Sailor on bridge | Uncredited |
| 1952 | Talk About a Stranger | Sailor on motorcycle | Uncredited |
| 1952 | Skirts Ahoy! | French-speaking sailor | Uncredited |
| 1952 | You for Me | Friend | Scenes deleted |
| 1952 | Fearless Fagan | Pvt. Thomson | Uncredited |
| 1952 | Battle Zone | Marine | Uncredited |
| 1952 | Flat Top | Sailor | Uncredited |
| 1952 | Off Limits | Staff Sgt. Wagner | Uncredited |
| 1953 | Battle Circus | Runner | Uncredited |
| 1953 | Destination Gobi | Aide, Argus HQ | Uncredited |
| 1953 | The Girls of Pleasure Island | Marine | Uncredited |
| 1953 | The War of the Worlds | Zippy | Uncredited |
| 1953 | The Glory Brigade | Pvt. 'Stoney' Stone | |
| 1953 | Affair with a Stranger | Television announcer | Scenes deleted |
| 1953 | Gentlemen Prefer Blondes | Winston – Olympic team | Uncredited |
| 1953 | The Affairs of Dobie Gillis | Interrupted registering freshman | Uncredited |
| 1953 | China Venture | Carlson | |
| 1953 | The Wild One | Pigeon | Uncredited |
| 1954 | Riot in Cell Block 11 | Gator | |
| 1954 | Secret of the Incas | Young man at bar | Uncredited |
| 1954 | Susan Slept Here | Virgil | |
| 1954 | Return from the Sea | Smitty | |
| 1954 | There's No Business Like Show Business | Katy's date | Uncredited |
| 1955 | An Annapolis Story | Willie 'Seaweed' Warren | |
| 1955 | 5 Against the House | Roy | |
| 1956 | Screaming Eagles | Pvt. Grimes | |
| 1957 | The Persuader | Willy Williams | |
| 1957 | Designing Woman | Luke Coslow | |
| 1957 | The Invisible Boy | Scientist #4 (pranks scene) | Uncredited |
| 1958 | The Perfect Furlough | Pvt. Marvin Brewer | |
| 1958 | The Heart Is a Rebel | Bill | |
| 1960 | New Comedy Showcase | Andy | Episode "Johnny Come Lately" |
| 1960 | The Wackiest Ship in the Army | Seaman J. Johnson | |
| 1961 | Everything's Ducky | Jim Lipscott | |
| 1961 | Twist Around the Clock | Dizzy Bellew | |
| 1963 | For Love or Money | George | |
| 1963 | Sunday in New York | Airport ticket clerk | Uncredited |
| 1963 | Move Over, Darling | Room service waiter | |
| 1963 | The Raiders | Corporal | |
| 1964 | 3 Nuts in Search of a Bolt | Sutter T. Finley | |
| 1964 | The Devil's Bedroom | | |
| 1965 | A Very Special Favor | Ralph | Uncredited |
| 1965 | Love and Kisses | Officer Jones | |
| 1965 | One Way Wahine | Maxwell | |
| 1966 | Hazel - A Car Named Chrysanthemum | Mr. Haverstraw | |
| 1967 | The Adventures of Bullwhip Griffin | Mr. Brown | Uncredited |
| 1967 | The Gnome-Mobile | Gas station mechanic | Uncredited |
| 1969 | The Witchmaker | Dr. Ralph Hayes | |
| 1971 | The Brotherhood of Satan | Tobey | |
| 1971 | The Late Liz | Bill Morris | |
| 1973 | Time to Run | Officer Andy Sildania | |
| 1974 | Herbie Rides Again | Angry taxi driver | |
| 1975 | A Boy and His Dog | Dr. Moore | |
| 1975 | The Specialist | Bailiff Humbolt | |
| 1975 | Dr. Minx | Sheriff Frank | |
| 1980 | Smokey and the Hotwire Gang | Sheriff Flower | |
| 1981 | Scream | Allen | |
| 1981 | Early Warning | Paul Marshal | |
| 1983 | Mortuary | Bob Stevens | |
| 1984 | They're Playing with Fire | Jimbo | |
| 1985 | Here Come the Littles | Grandpa Little | Voice |
| 1989 | Intruder | Officer Dalton | |
| 1989 | The Horror Show | Chili salesman | |

=== Television ===
| Year | Title | Role | Notes |
|---|---|---|---|
| 1958 | The Donna Reed Show | Hank | Episode: "The Male Ego" |
| 1962 | Death Valley Days | Grass Man, Andy Kale, David Douglas | |
| 1963 | The Virginian | 2nd man | Episode: "Run Away Home" |
| 1965 | The Munsters | Dr. Grant | Episode: "Bats of a Feather" |
| 1965 | Green Acres | County Agricultural Agent Hank Kimball | |
| 1978 | How the West Was Won | Swenson | Three episodes |
| 1980 | Little House on the Prairie | Mr. Crowley | Episode: "He Loves Me, He Loves Me Not (Part II)" |
| 1981 | The Waltons | Frank Sims | Episode: "The Indiscretion" |
| 1982 | Fantasy Island | Mr. Stone | Episode: "Daddy's Little Girl/The Whistle" |
| 1983 | The Christmas Tree Train | Abner, Santa Claus | Voice, television special |
| 1983 | The Littles | Grandpa Little | Voice, 29 episodes |
| 1984 | Which Witch Is Which | Abner | Voice, television special |
| 1986 | ABC Weekend Specials | Grandpa Little | Voice, episode: "Liberty and the Littles" |
| 1987 | A Chucklewood Easter | Abner | Voice, television special |
| 1989 | Little White Lies | Mr. Jenkell | Television film |
| 1989 | Newhart | Delivery Man | Episode: "Murder at the Stratley" |
| 1990 | Return to Green Acres | Hank Kimball | Television film |
| 1992 | The Jackie Thomas Show | Mayor | Episode: "Aloha, Io-wahu" |
| 1993 | Phenom | Mr. Berger | Episode: "Brian and the Tennis Star" |
| 1994 | The Boys Are Back | Old Man | Episode: "The Fishing Trip" |
| 1994 | Frasier | Putnam | Episode: "Flour Child" |
| 1994 | Hardball | Old Hardball | Episode: "Lee's Bad, Bad Day" |
| 1995 | Live Shot | | Episode: "Towering Infernos" |
| 2000 | The Adventure Machine | | Voice, television special, posthumous role |
