= Frank Cady =

American actor (1915–2012)

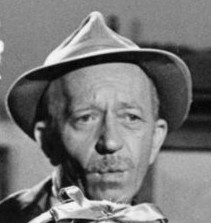
- Cady in Petticoat Junction, 1968
- Born: Frank Randolph Cady; September 8, 1915; Susanville, California, U.S.
- Died: June 8, 2012 (aged 96); Wilsonville, Oregon, U.S.
- Resting place: Los Osos Valley Memorial Park, Los Osos, California
- Other names: Frankie Cady; Frank R. Cady
- Education: Stanford University
- Occupation: Actor
- Years active: 1947–1990
- Known for: Sam Drucker
- Television: The Beverly Hillbillies; Green Acres; Petticoat Junction
- Spouse: Shirley Cady (m. 1940; died 2008)
- Children: 2

Frank Randolph Cady (September 8, 1915 – June 8, 2012) was an American actor best known for his role as storekeeper Sam Drucker in three American television series during the 1960s — Petticoat Junction, Green Acres, and The Beverly Hillbillies — and his earlier role as Doc Williams on The Adventures of Ozzie and Harriet.

== Early life ==
Cady was born in Susanville, California, the youngest of three children of Leon and Clara Cady. In high school, he worked at a local newspaper, The Lassen County Advocate. Cady's family later moved to Wilsonville, Oregon.

He studied journalism and drama at Stanford University, where he was involved with the campus humor magazine, the Stanford Chaparral. Following college graduation, Cady served an apprenticeship at the Westminster Theater in London, appearing in four plays. In England, he made an early television appearance on the BBC in late 1938.

He returned to Stanford in 1939 for graduate studies and a position as a teaching assistant. While at Stanford, Cady met and later married his wife, Shirley Katherine Jones, in 1940. Born in Oakland, California, Shirley Cady, a Stanford graduate, had several vocations — professional singer, teacher, and legal secretary.

Dissatisfied with academia, Frank began a series of jobs two years later, as an announcer and news broadcaster at various California radio stations. His career was put on hold in 1943 when he joined the United States Army Air Forces, serving in England, France, and Germany during World War II.

== Television and movie career ==
After being discharged from military service in 1946, Cady appeared in a series of plays in the Los Angeles area that led to movie roles, beginning in 1947. In 1949, he had an uncredited speaking role in the film noir drama D.O.A.. In 1950, he had another uncredited role in Father of the Bride. He had a small part in The Asphalt Jungle (also 1950) playing a witness who refused to identify a robbery suspect. He appeared in George Pal's film When Worlds Collide (1951), and worked with Pal again in 1964 in 7 Faces of Dr. Lao.

Cady appeared in Billy Wilder's Ace in the Hole (or The Big Carnival, also 1951) and portrayed the male half of the fire escape sleeping couple in Rear Window in 1954. He played the husband of Eileen Heckart characters in two films: The Bad Seed (1956) and Zandy's Bride (1974). He appeared on the Make Room For Daddy episode that was the pilot for The Andy Griffith Show. He was cast on some radio programs, including Gunsmoke episode #140 ("Outlaw Robin Hood") on January 8, 1955.

In the 1950s, Cady played Doc Williams in The Adventures of Ozzie and Harriet (1953–1964). In 1961, he made a guest appearance on Perry Mason as twin brothers Joe and Hiram Widlock in "The Case of the Pathetic Patient".

In 1964, he played Webb Norton, an angry and abusive father (to Dylan Cannon’s character Ivy Norton) on Gunsmoke, in the episode “Aunt Thede” (S10E13).

He worked in television and was the only actor to play a recurring character on three television sitcoms at the same time, which he did from 1968 to 1969. He appeared on The Beverly Hillbillies, Green Acres, and Petticoat Junction simultaneously. As Sam Drucker, he appeared in 142 of 170 Green Acres episodes during its six-year run from 1965 to 1971. Also as Drucker, he was one of only three co-stars of Petticoat Junction who stayed with the series for its entire seven-year run (1963–1970), along with Edgar Buchanan and Linda Henning, appearing in 152 of the show's 222 episodes. He played Drucker in 10 episodes of The Beverly Hillbillies from 1968 to 1970, and he continued his Drucker role in the final season of Green Acres after Petticoat Junction ended in 1970.

His final acting role was in the television movie Return to Green Acres (1990). In a 1995 interview with the Portland Oregonian, Cady spoke of his television career: "You get typecast. I'm remembered for those shows and not for some pretty good acting jobs I did other times. I suppose I ought to be grateful for that, because otherwise I wouldn't be remembered at all. I've got to be one of the luckiest guys in the world."

In 2005, Cady attended Eddie Albert's funeral, along with Green Acres co-stars Sid Melton and Mary Grace Canfield.

== Death ==
Shirley Cady died on August 22, 2008, at the age of 96. The Cadys, who were married 68 years, had two children – daughter Catherine Turk and son Steven Cady. They had three grandchildren and three great-grandchildren. Frank Cady died at his home on June 8, 2012, at age 96. No specific cause was given. Upon his death he was cremated and his ashes are buried at Los Osos Valley Memorial Park, Los Osos, California in the same plot as his wife.

== Filmography ==
Year	Title	Role	Notes
1948	He Walked by Night	Pete Hammond	Uncredited
1949	Flamingo Road	Tom Hill	Uncredited
1949	D.O.A.	Eddie - Bartender	Uncredited
1950	Perfect Strangers	Geologist	Uncredited
1950	The Asphalt Jungle	Night Clerk	Uncredited
1950	The Great Rupert	Mr. Taney - Tax Collector	
1950	Father of the Bride	Engagement Party Guest	Uncredited
1950	Emergency Wedding	Mr. Hoff	Uncredited
1950	Experiment Alcatraz	Max Henry	
1950	Mrs. O'Malley and Mr. Malone	Harry	Uncredited
1950	A Christmas Wish	Tax Investigator	
1951	Hunt the Man Down	Showbox Puppeteer	Uncredited
1951	Lightning Strikes Twice	Gas Station Man	Uncredited
1951	Dear Brat	Creavy	
1951	Ace in the Hole	Al Ferderber	
1951	Let's Make It Legal	Ferguson	
1951	When Worlds Collide	Harold Ferris	
1952	The Atomic City	F.B.I. Agent George Weinberg	
1952	The Sellout	Bennie Amboy	
1953	Half a Hero	Mr. Watts	
1953	Marry Me Again	Dr. Day	
1954	Rear Window	Man on Fire Escape	
1955	Trial	Canford	Uncredited
1955	The Indian Fighter	Trader Joe	
1956	The Bad Seed	Henry Daigle	
1956	Three Violent People	Dr. Graham	Uncredited
1957	The Tin Star	Abe Pickett	Uncredited
1958	The Missouri Traveler	Willie Poole	
1958	The Girl Most Likely	Pop	
1959	The Man Who Understood Women	John Milstead	
1964	7 Faces of Dr. Lao	Mayor James Sargent	
1967	The Gnome-Mobile	Charlie Pettibone	Uncredited
1970	The Million Dollar Duck	Assayer	
1974	Zandy's Bride	Pa Allan	
1975	Hearts of the West	Pa Tater	
1990	Return to Green Acres	Sam Drucker	TV movie; final film role

== Television credits ==
Year	Series	Role	Episode(s)
1954–1965	The Adventures of Ozzie and Harriet	Doc Williams	71 episodes
1956	December Bride		"Lily in a Gas Station"
1956	Private Secretary	Barney	"Passing the Buck"
1957	Broken Arrow	Thaddeus Parker	"Devil's Eye"
1958	Maverick	Hamelin	"Rope of Cards"
1958	Trackdown	Bob Tail	"The Wedding"
1959	The Gale Storm Show	Director	"It's Murder My Dear"
1959	Sugarfoot	Lawyer Jay Hollis	"The Mysterious Stranger"
1960	The Alaskans	Bradshaw	"The Last Bullet"
1960	Make Room for Daddy	Will Hoople - Town Drunk	"Danny Meets Andy Griffith"
1960	Klondike	Lester	"Swoger's Mule"
1961	Guestward, Ho!	Harry Crawford	"Bill, the Fireman"
1961	Hawaiian Eye	Harvey Gamson	"The Stanhope Brand"
1961	Pete and Gladys	Teller	"The Live-In Couple"
1961	Perry Mason	Joe/Hiram Widlock	"The Case of the Pathetic Patient"
1961	Rawhide	Storekeeper	S3:E14, "Incident of the Big Blowout"
1962	Dennis the Menace	Dr. Ferguson	"The Club Initiation"
1962	The Joey Bishop Show	Defense Attorney	"Very Warm For Christmas"
1962	Cheyenne	Wayne	"The Quick and the Deadly"
1963	The Virginian	Mr. Hardy	"The Exiles"
1963	Glynis	George	"The Pros and Cons"
1963	Grindl	Mr. Burroughs	"The Great Bank Robbery"
1963–1970	Petticoat Junction	Mr. Drucker, The General Store Shopkeeper	168 episodes
1964	Hazel	Mr. Pincus	"The Flagpole"
1964	Gunsmoke	Webb Norton	"Aunt Thede"
1965–1966	The Andy Griffith Show	Luke	2 episodes
1965–1971	Green Acres	Mr. Drucker, The General Store Shopkeeper	142 episodes
1968–1970	The Beverly Hillbillies	Sam Drucker	10 episodes
1974	Hawaii Five-O	Judge Edgar Bergstrom	"Mother's Deadly Helper"
1974–1975	These Are the Days	Homer (voice)	16 episodes
1977	Eight Is Enough		"Hit and Run"
1977	ABC Weekend Special	Mr. Minney	"The Winged Colt"
1978	ABC Weekend Special	Mr. Sutter	"Soup and Me"
1978	ABC Weekend Special	Mr. Sutter	"Soup for President"
