= Intruder (1989 film) =

1989 film by Scott Spiegel

- DVD released by Wizard Video
- Directed by: Scott Spiegel
- Screenplay by: Scott Spiegel
- Story by: Scott Spiegel; Lawrence Bender
- Based on: Night Crew by Scott Spiegel
- Produced by: Lawrence Bender
- Starring: Elizabeth Cox; Renée Estevez; Dan Hicks; David Byrnes; Sam Raimi; Eugene Robert Glazer; Billy Marti; Burr Steers; Craig Stark
- Cinematography: Fernando Argüelles
- Edited by: King Wilder
- Music by: Dick Walter, Graham De Wilde
- Production companies: Beyond Infinity; Phantom Productions
- Distributed by: Empire Pictures
- Release date: January 27, 1989 (United States)
- Running time: 83 minutes (R-rated version); 88 minutes (Unrated Director's Cut)
- Country: United States
- Language: English
- Budget: $130,000

Intruder is a 1989 American slasher film written and directed by Scott Spiegel, and co-written and produced by Lawrence Bender. It received positive reviews from critics, with particular praise given for its unique setting of a grocery store for a slasher film.

== Plot ==
A supermarket closes and the workers begin restocking the shelves for the next day. Craig – the ex-boyfriend of cashier Jennifer – appears and the two quarrel. Worried about her friend, her coworker, Linda, witnesses the debacle and presses her security button at her cash checkout. Co-owner Bill shows up and a fight ensues. Craig escapes onto the shop floor. The night crew sets out to track him down while Jennifer calls the police. When they find Craig, there is another scuffle. He is ejected from the building and disappears into the night.

The owners gather the night crew to announce that they are selling the store and that the staff will soon lose their jobs. The employees are assigned to mark down all the stock in preparation for the close. Craig makes telephone calls to the store, upsetting Jennifer. The police arrive but do little to help and just tell the group to be careful.

After finishing her shift, Linda is stabbed by an unseen assailant. Bill spots someone trying to enter through the back door and goes outside to investigate. He finds Craig watching Jennifer through the bathroom window and is rendered unconscious.

Back in the store, the killer begins to brutally murder the employees and scatters their severed body parts around the store. Noticing that everyone seems to have vanished, Jennifer investigates and discovers several bodies and body parts in the storerooms. Terrified, she is attacked by the killer but manages to escape back to the shop floor. Hearing someone at the door, she tries to draw their attention, but the person has left by the time she gets there. Craig grabs her, but she beats him with a meat hook.

Bill then staggers in. Claiming that Craig attacked him outside the store, he proceeds to call the police. Jennifer notices Bill's hands are covered in blood and realizes that he is the killer. Bill tells her that he could not let his partner sell the store, so he killed him and got carried away, killing everyone. Bill attacks Jennifer and chases her around the locked building. A delivery man appears outside, but Bill kills him before Jennifer can get his attention. Bill re-enters the building and stalks Jennifer again. Craig tells Jennifer he saw Bill killing Linda, and that he climbed into the building through the bathroom window to save her. Bill appears and bludgeons Craig while Jennifer flees.

Crawling out the bathroom window, she tries to escape in her car but finds Linda's body inside. Bill grabs her legs and pulls Jennifer under the car, but she stabs him with a knife taken from Linda's body. She heads to a phone booth to call the police, but Bill reappears and starts to smash the booth to get at her. He topples the phone booth over and traps her, but Craig appears and brutally damages him with a meat cleaver.

When the police arrive, one of the policemen finds the carnage in the store. The severely injured Bill claims that Jennifer and Craig are responsible for the attack. The policemen ignore their protests and arrest them. Bill suddenly opens his eyes as Jennifer screams, leaving all of their fates unknown.

== Cast ==
- Elizabeth Cox as Jennifer Ross
- Renée Estevez as Linda
- Dan Hicks as Bill Roberts
- David Byrnes as Craig Peterson
- Sam Raimi as Randy
- Eugene Robert Glazer as Danny
- Billy Marti as Dave
- Burr Steers as Bub
- Craig Stark as Tim
- Ted Raimi as Joe "Produce Joe"
- Alvy Moore as Officer Dalton
- Tom Lester as Officer Mathews
- Emil Sitka as Mr. Abernathy
- Bruce Campbell as Officer Howard
- Lawrence Bender as Officer Adams
- Scott Spiegel as Bread Man
- Greg Nicotero as Townie In Car
- Douglas Hessler as Townie At Door

== Production ==
Intruder marked the feature directorial debut of Scott Spiegel. The film was partially based around Spiegel's experience working at the real Walnut Lake Market in Michigan. It was also something of a remake of an earlier Super-8 short film by Spiegel. The short was a slasher story called Night Crew and featured a more Halloween-inspired killer.

Intruder was filmed at an empty grocery store, which was rented to the crew of the film. The shelves were empty and bare, and the crew had a company that specialized in damaged goods deliver over two tons of defective merchandise to stock the store.

== Release ==
The film was originally entitled The Night Crew, but distributors felt that the film would be more marketable if it was given a more generic slasher film title; thus, it was released as Intruder.

The Paramount VHS video cover (along with various other video and DVD releases) and the film's trailers all reveal the identity of the killer, thus spoiling the film's dramatic tension.

Bruce Campbell, Sam Raimi, and Ted Raimi were all heavily promoted by Paramount as the stars of the film, and their names feature prominently on video and DVD artwork. Sam Raimi actually plays a supporting character, Ted Raimi has a small supporting role, barely more than a bit part, and Bruce Campbell appears in the final scene in a brief cameo. The back cover of the DVD release makes it appear that Renée Estevez is the heroine, whereas in the film she is the first character to die.

The original VHS release from Paramount Home Video contained the R-rated version, which was missing five minutes of gore footage. Nearly all of KNB's effects footage was removed. The 2005 US DVD release by Wizard Video presents the director's cut. Synapse Films released an uncensored version of Intruder on combo DVD/Blu-ray on December 13, 2011. In 2017, 88 Films released the film uncensored on DVD and Blu-ray with bonus features, double-sided cover art and a restored and remastered version of the film. In 2019, Full Moon Features released a 30th anniversary DVD which was remastered from the original camera negative and features the uncensored version of the film.

== Reception ==
Intruder had a positive reception. Adam Tyner of DVD Talk awarded the film four and a half out of five stars and wrote, "Intruder easily ranks up there as one of the best slashers I've ever seen". DVD Verdict referred to it as "a very cool film. While it includes all the genre tropes, it presents them in a way that feels fresher and more creative than many of the countless other maniac-on-the-loose films that the decade produced". Intruder was deemed one of the "greatest entries" in the slasher film boom of the 1980s by Horror News.net. Bloody Disgusting rated the film three out of five stars and wrote: "It's certainly no horror classic, but for stalwart gorehounds, Intruder is sweet, sweet manna".

Moria called it "a minor B-budget film" that "has gained a reasonable reputation because of its proliferation in a variety of cut and uncut versions". The review judged the film "merely mediocre" and said that Spiegel "mostly cuts to the gory punchline" instead of building suspense, but found it most interesting for the cast and crew members who later went on to other work, among them Sam Raimi, Ted Raimi, Burr Steers and co-writer and producer Lawrence Bender. Mondo Digital wrote that "in a more forgiving universe" the film "would have been the last great, gory swan song of the '80s American slasher era", and blamed its poor initial reception among horror fans on distributor Empire Pictures "scissoring out all of the gory highlights" for an R-rated, almost direct-to-VHS release. Calling it "far from a perfect film", with an "oddly edited" opening half hour and performances that "range from competent to hammy to bland", the review still found it "a huge amount of fun if you love your slashers done old school style", and described the uncut Synapse Blu-ray as "an essential restored chapter in '80s horror history".
