= Eleanor Audley =

American actress (1905–1991)

- Audley in 1962
- Born: Eleanor Zellman; November 19, 1905; Newark, New Jersey, U.S.
- Died: November 25, 1991 (aged 86); Los Angeles, California, U.S.
- Resting place: Mount Sinai Memorial Park Cemetery
- Other name: Elinor Audley
- Occupation: Actress
- Years active: 1926–1970
- Known for: Voice of Lady Tremaine in Disney's Cinderella (1950); Voice of Maleficent in Disney's Sleeping Beauty (1959)
- Television: Green Acres (1965–1969)

Eleanor Audley (née Zellman; November 19, 1905 – November 25, 1991) was an American actress with a distinctive voice and a diverse body of work. She played Oliver Douglas's mom, Eunice Douglas, on the CBS sitcom Green Acres (1965–1969), and provided two Disney animated classics with the voices of the two iconic villainesses: Lady Tremaine, Cinderella's evil stepmother in Cinderella (1950), and Maleficent, the wicked fairy in Sleeping Beauty (1959). She had roles in live-action films, but was most active in radio programs such as My Favorite Husband as Liz Cooper's mother-in-law, Mrs. Cooper, and Father Knows Best as the Anderson family's neighbor, Mrs. Smith. Audley's television appearances include those in I Love Lucy, The Dick Van Dyke Show, Mister Ed, Hazel, The Beverly Hillbillies, Pistols 'n' Petticoats, and My Three Sons.

== Early and personal life ==
Eleanor Zellman was born in Newark, New Jersey on November 19, 1905 to a Jewish family. Her family had moved to West 86th Street in Manhattan, New York City, by 1917.

Zellman began using the stage name "Eleanor Audley" sometime before 1940.

== Career ==
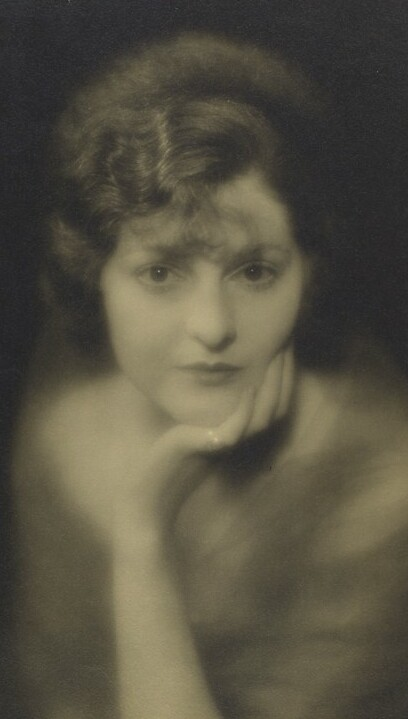
Audley in the 1920s, during her years on the Broadway stage

=== Stage and radio ===
Audley made her Broadway debut at age 21 in the 1926 production of Howdy, King. Her other stage credits include On Call (1928–1929); Pigeons and People and Thunder on the Left (both 1933); Kill That Story and Ladies' Money (both 1934); Susan and God (1943); and In Bed We Cry (1944).

Audley worked extensively in the 1940s and 1950s in radio, notably playing Liz Cooper's aristocratic mother-in-law, Mrs. Cooper, who typically looks down on her, on My Favorite Husband (the role was initially played by Bea Benaderet), and the Anderson family's neighbor, Mrs. Smith, on Father Knows Best. In addition, Audley performed on radio as a frequent performer on Romance, Escape, Suspense, Lux Radio Theatre, The Story of Dr. Kildare, The Railroad Hour, and Yours Truly, Johnny Dollar. She played the stepmother in one-shot adaptations of the "Cinderella" story on the anthology series Hallmark Playhouse, and the weekly western series The Six Shooter, that starred James Stewart.

=== Film and animation ===
Audley's first onscreen appearance was an uncredited role as a parole board member in the 1949 noir film The Story of Molly X starring June Havoc. Other film appearances followed, including: Pretty Baby (1950); Gambling House (1951); Cell 2455, Death Row (1955); The Unguarded Moment; Full of Life (both 1956); Spoilers of the Forest (1957); Home Before Dark (1958); a cameo as the mother and slain victim of suspect Jack Graham in The FBI Story (1959); The Second Time Around (1961); and Hook, Line and Sinker (1969). Audley was uncredited dubbing the lines of actors playing small parts in films such as I Was a Male War Bride (1949) and Broken Arrow (1950).

In the animated film industry, Audley provided her distinctive voice to Lady Tremaine, Cinderella's cruel stepmother, in the 1950 Disney film Cinderella; and Princess Aurora's wicked fairy nemesis, Maleficent, in Disney's 1959 version of Sleeping Beauty. For those films, animators Frank Thomas and Marc Davis designed the characters' facial features and expressions to be closely similar to Audley's. In addition to providing their voices, she served as the performance model for both characters for live-action referencing to help the animators. Audley had initially turned down the role of Maleficent because she was battling tuberculosis at the time.

Audley provided the voice for Madame Leota, the spirit of a psychic medium, in the Haunted Mansion attractions in Disneyland and Walt Disney World.

=== Television ===
Audley's first television appearance was in the pilot episode of The Mickey Rooney Show as Bessie Frost, a terrible actress who stars in a series called The Trials and Tribulations of Auntie Julia on the fictional IBC network where Mickey Mulligan works as a page. From 1954 to 1970, she appeared regularly on television, including episodes of: The People's Choice; I Love Lucy; Crossroads; Perry Mason (in two appearances as different characters); The Real McCoys; Richard Diamond, Private Detective; The Twilight Zone; Dennis the Menace; Mr. Lucky; The Tab Hunter Show; Pete and Gladys; and Hazel (in four appearances as different characters). Audley had recurring roles on The Dick Van Dyke Show as the P.T.A. head Mrs. Billings, on The Beverly Hillbillies as the school headmistress Mrs. Potts, on Mister Ed as Wilbur Post's aunt Martha, on Pistols 'n' Petticoats as Mrs. Teaseley, on My Three Sons as Mrs. Vincent, and on Green Acres as Oliver Douglas's disapproving mother, Eunice Douglas, despite being only five months older than actor Eddie Albert who played the role of her son.

== Death ==
Audley died from respiratory failure on November 25, 1991, six days after her 86th birthday. She is interred at Mount Sinai Memorial Park Cemetery in Los Angeles, California.

== Filmography ==
=== Film ===
Year	Title	Role	Notes	Ref
1950	Cinderella	Lady Tremaine	Voice	
1950	Pretty Baby	Miss Karen Brindel		
1951	Gambling House	Mrs. Fern Livingston		
1955	Untamed	Lady Vernon		
1955	Cell 2455, Death Row	Blanche		
1955	All That Heaven Allows	Mrs. Humphrey	Uncredited	
1956	Full of Life	Mrs. Kelly Jameson		
1956	The Unguarded Moment	Mr. Pendleton's secretary		
1957	Spoilers of the Forest	Mrs. Shelby Walters		
1957	Jeanne Eagels	Sob Sister	Uncredited	
1958	Voice in the Mirror	Speaker at Soup Kitchen	Uncredited	
1958	Step Down to Terror	Mrs. Felicia Brighton	Uncredited	
1958	Home Before Dark	Mrs. Jayne Hathaway		
1959	Sleeping Beauty	Maleficent	Voice	
1961	The Second Time Around	Mrs. Katie Trask		
1964	The Unsinkable Molly Brown	Mrs. Cartwright		
1968	Never a Dull Moment	Society Matron		
1969	Hook, Line and Sinker	Mrs. Maya Durham		

=== Television ===
- Studio 57 (1954) as Miss Anna Hunt
- The Loretta Young Show (1954) as Miss Bennett, (1958) as Edith Landow
- General Electric Theatre (1954) as Woman in Restaurant, (1955–1956), (1959) as Alice Martin
- The Pepsi-Cola Playhouse (1955)
- Front Row Center (1955) as Carlotta Vance
- Damon Runyon Theater (1955) as Cynthia
- Celebrity Playhouse (1955)
- The Ford Television Theatre (1955) as Tina, (1955), (1957) as Constance Perks
- The Millionaire (1955) as Cynthia Semple, (1958) as Gloria Van Enger/Columnist
- Our Miss Brooks (1956) as Mrs. Maya Pryor
- The 20th Century-Fox Hour (1956) as Governor's Wife/Mrs. Lucy Hammond/Mrs. Julie Morgan
- Climax! (1956)
- Screen Directors Playhouse (1956) as Judith Brenner
- The People's Choice (1956) as Moderator/Mrs. Kimbeley "Kim" Price
- The Adventures of Jim Bowie (1956) as Miss Peabody
- Father Knows Best (1956) as Saleslady/Woman giving spare change (uncredited)/Bookstacker in Library
- Crusader (1956) as Mrs. Erika Watson
- Lux Video Theatre (1956) as Mrs. Sandy Lane, (1957) as Aunt Ada
- The George Burns and Gracie Allen Show (1956) as The Lady Customer, (1957) as Mrs. Felicity Crowley/Mrs. Winthrop, (1958) as The Saleslady
- The Gale Storm Show: Oh! Susanna (1956) as Passenger, (1957) as Mrs. Michelle Gardiner, (1960) as Bess Pomeroy
- The Bob Hope Specials (1956–1957; 1966)
- Cavalcade of America (1957) as Mrs. Stacey Littlefield
- I Love Lucy (1957) as Eleanor Spaulding/Flower Judge
- Crossroads (1957) as Mrs. Sophie Sand
- The Lineup (1957) as Maryanne Carstaires
- The Gray Ghost (1957) as Mrs. Joan Maddox
- How to Marry a Millionaire (1957) as Gertrude Van Dyne
- Frontier Doctor (1958) as Hattie Black
- The Old Testament Scriptures (1958) as Naomi
- Jane Wyman Presents The Fireside Theatre (1958) as Mrs. Emily Trumbull
- Perry Mason (1958) as Lois Gilbert, (1960) as Headmistress Lorimer
- Wagon Train (1958) as Mrs. Winston, (1961) as Mother Albright, (1963) as Minerva Ames
- The Real McCoys (1959) as Dr. Laurence Kirkwood
- The Ann Sothern Show (1959) as Mrs. Jenny Thompson
- Mike Hammer (1959) as Mrs. Wendy Milford
- Hennesey (1959)
- Richard Diamond, Private Detective (1959) as Mrs. Deneken
- The Twilight Zone (1960) as Mrs. Whitney (uncredited)
- Walt Disney Presents (1960) as Mrs. Annie Videau
- Johnny Midnight (1960) as Mrs. Mia Rice
- The Untouchables (1960) as Mrs. Micheline Cross
- The Man From Blackhawk (1960) as Comtesse De Vilon
- Dennis the Menace (1960) as Mrs. Andrea Pompton
- Peter Gunn (1960) as Laura Scott
- Mr. Lucky (1960) as Mrs. Alice Dubois
- Make Room for Daddy (1960) as Mrs. Anette Willoughby
- Shirley Temple's Storybook (1960) as Miss Felicity Collingwood
- New Comedy Showcase (1960)
- Have Gun - Will Travel (1960) as Cynthia Palmer, (1961) as School Teacher, (1963) as Mrs. Hannah Randolph Quincy
- The Tab Hunter Show (1961) as Columnist
- The Tom Ewell Show (1961) as Madame Defarge
- The Joey Bishop Show (1961) as Mrs. Adrianne Willoughby, (1962) as Fashion Announcer/Mrs. Penny Fitch as Clubwoman
- Pete and Gladys (1961) as Mrs. Linda Brenner, (1962) as Mrs. Elisa Clibber
- The Dick Van Dyke Show (1961) as Party Goer, (1962–1963) as Mrs. Peggy Billings
- Mister Ed (1961; 1965) as Aunt Martha
- Hazel (1961) as Customer, (1962) as Mrs. Totter, (1963) as Mrs. Loretta Green, (1965) as Mrs. Katie Hardy
- The Best of the Post (1962) as Mrs. Jackie Hill (as Elinor Audley)
- Ichabod and Me (1962)
- The Many Loves of Dobie Gillis (1962) as Irma Lumpkin
- The Detectives (1962) as Liz Roberts
- The Beverly Hillbillies (1962–1964) as Mrs. Millicent Schuyler-Potts
- The Dick Powell Theatre (1963) as Lady
- The New Phil Silvers Show (1963) as Mrs. Allison Osborne
- McHale's Navy (1964) as Mrs. Millicent Hardsey
- Many Happy Returns (1964) as Mrs. Pernandina Atwood
- Bob Hope Presents The Chrysler Theatre (1964) as Mrs. Johnson/Lil Schaeffer/Buttercup Fuchisa
- The Farmer's Daughter (1964) as Simone, (1965) as Mildred
- The Cara Williams Show (1965) as Mrs. Lorence Ashford
- The Man From U.N.C.L.E. (1965) as Mrs. Laura Farnham
- The Jack Benny Program (1965) as Mrs. Jeanna Lewis
- Kentucky Jones (1965) as Mrs. Winnona Edgerton
- Peyton Place (1965) as Miss Martha (uncredited)
- O.K. Crackerby! (1965) as Mrs. Ameila Willoughby
- The Lucy Show (1965) as The Columnist
- The Big Valley (1965) as Mother Callahan
- My Brother the Angel (1965) as Mrs. Evelyne Ettinger
- Green Acres (1965–1969) as Mother Eunice Douglas
- Honey West (1966) as Mrs. Juniper Carlton Murdock
- Summer Fun (1966) as Mother-in-law
- The Phyllis Diller Show (1966) as Mrs. Elsa Fenwick
- Pistols 'n' Petticoats (1966–1967) as Mrs. Jenny Teasley
- My Three Sons (1969–1970) as Mrs. Beatrice Vincent
- The Wonderful World of Disney (1977) as Lady Tremaine (voice, archived)/Maleficent (voice, archived)
- Disney's Wonderful World (1979) as Matron (archived)
- Walt Disney (1983) as Lady Tremaine (voice, archived)/Maleficent (voice, archived)
- The Wonderful World of Disney (1998) as Maleficent (voice, archived)

=== Radio ===
- The Bishop and the Gargoyle (NBC special, July 14, 1940)
- Adventure Ahead (NBC Red, 1944)
- Romance (CBS series, 1944–1954, not often credited), episodes include "Pride and Prejudice" and "The Long Way Home"
- Words at War (NBC Red, 1945)
- The Eternal Light (NBC, 1945–1946)
- Encore Theatre (CBS, 1946)
- The Big Story (NBC, 1947)
- Escape (CBS, 1947–1948), episodes include "Back for Christmas" and "The Man Who Could Work Miracles"
- The Adventures of Ellery Queen (ABC, 1947–1948)
- Suspense (CBS, 1940s, not often credited), episodes include repeats of "Sorry, Wrong Number" and "The Man Who Wanted to Be Edward G. Robinson" (both 1948)
- The Whistler (CBS, 1948–1950)
- Lux Radio Theatre (CBS, 1948–1954)
- Sealtest Variety Theatre (NBC, 1949)
- My Home Town (NBC, 1949)
- This Is Your FBI (ABC, 1949)
- Richard Diamond, Private Detective (NBC, 1949)
- NBC University Theatre (NBC, 1949)
- Pursuit (CBS, 1949)
- The Hotpoint Holiday Hour (CBS, 1949), "The Man Who Came to Dinner"
- The Story of Dr. Kildare (syndicated, 1949–1950) as Molly Byrd
- My Favorite Husband (CBS, 1949–1951) as Mrs. Leticia Cooper
- The Railroad Hour (NBC, 1949–1954)
- Father Knows Best (NBC, 1949–1954) as Mrs. Elizabeth Smith
- The Life of Riley (NBC, 1950)
- The Halls of Ivy (NBC, 1950)
- The Adventures of Christopher London (NBC, 1950)
- The Saint (NBC, 1950)
- Screen Directors Playhouse (NBC, 1950–1951)
- Family Theatre (Mutual, 1950–1951)
- Night Beat (NBC, 1950–1952)
- Hollywood Star Playhouse (CBS, 1951)
- Hallmark Playhouse (CBS, 1951), includes "The Story Of Cinderella"
- The Six Shooter (NBC, 1953–1954) as Mrs. Abbey Ames
- Fibber McGee and Molly (NBC, 1954–1955)
- Yours Truly, Johnny Dollar (CBS, 1955–1960)
- The CBS Radio Workshop (CBS, 1956–1957)

=== Theme parks ===
- Haunted Mansion as Madame Leota (voice)
- HalloWishes as Madame Leota (voice)

=== Discography ===
- Walt Disney's Cinderella: Little Nipper Series (1949, RCA/Camden) as Lady Tremaine
- Walt Disney's Cinderella (1954, RCA/Camden) as Lady Tremaine
- The Story and Song from The Haunted Mansion (1969, Disneyland Records) as Madame Leota
- Disney Songs and Story: Sleeping Beauty (2012, Walt Disney Records) as Maleficent

=== Stage ===
- Howdy, King as guest in hotel, December 1926 to January 1927
- On Call as Mary Randall, November 1928 to January 1929
- Pigeons and People as Elinore Payne, January 1933 to November 1933
- Thunder on the Left as Ruth Brook, October 1933 to November 1933
- Kill That Story as Millicent, August 1934 to December 1934
- Ladies' Money as Claire Touhey, November 1934 to December 1934
- Susan and God as Charlotte Marley, October 1937 to June 1938, December 1943
- In Bed We Cry as Claire Dangerfield, November 1944 to December 23, 1944
