= Mary Grace Canfield =

American actress (1924–2014)

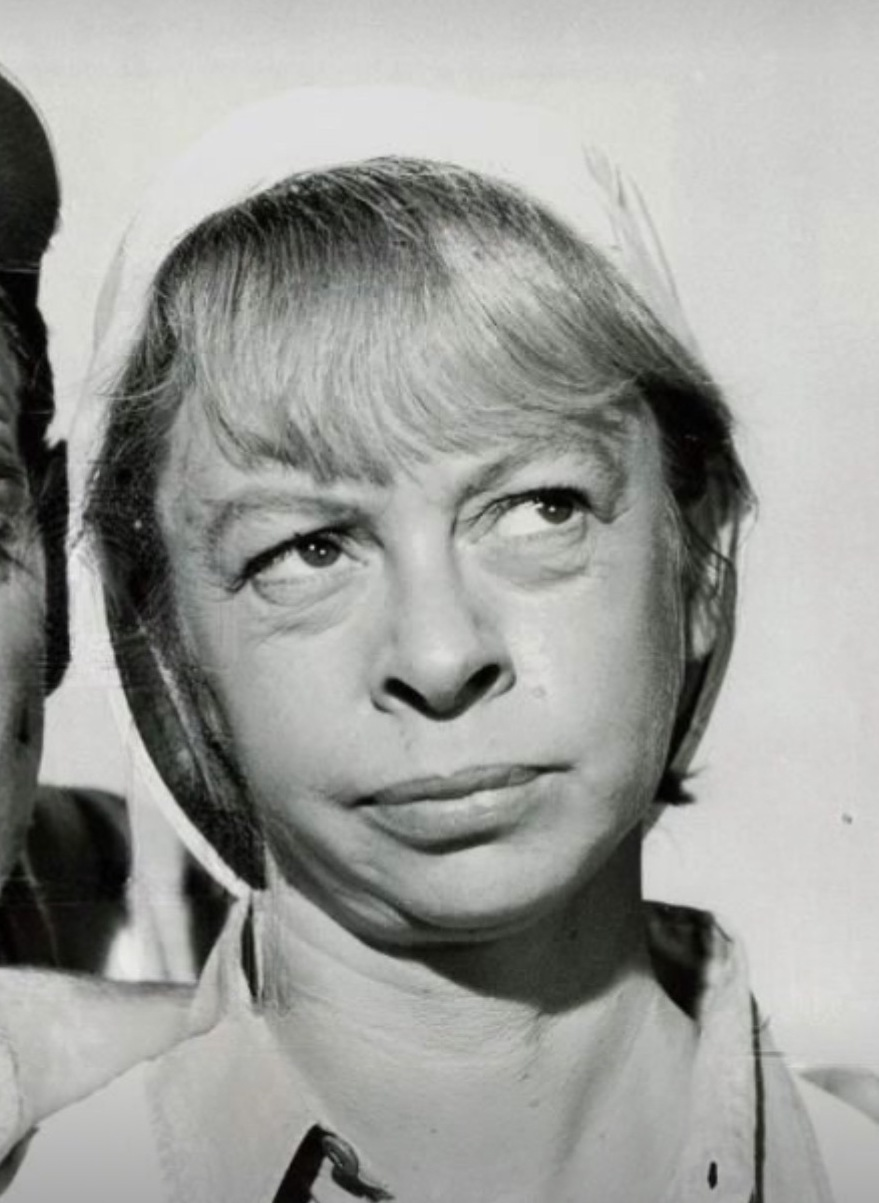
- Canfield in Green Acres (1967)
- Born: September 3, 1924; Rochester, New York, U.S.
- Died: February 15, 2014 (aged 89); Santa Barbara, California, U.S.
- Occupation: Actress
- Years active: 1950–1993
- Known for: Green Acres, The Andy Griffith Show
- Spouse(s): Charles Carey (divorced; 2 children); John Bischof (1984–2014; her death)

Mary Grace Canfield (September 3, 1924 – February 15, 2014) was an American theatre, film and television actress.

== Early life and career ==
Mary Grace Canfield was born in Rochester, New York, the second child of Hildegard (née Jacobson) and Hubert Canfield. She grew up in Pittsford, New York. She had a sister, Constance, who was two years older.

Acting mostly in small theatre companies and regional theatre between 1952 and 1964, she appeared in several Broadway plays, but most ran for no more than a month. Her Broadway credits include The Waltz of the Toreadors and The Frogs of Spring.

Canfield's first credited performance on television was in March 1954 when she portrayed Frances in the episode "Native Dancer" on Goodyear Playhouse. After making additional television appearances, she played housekeeper Amanda Allison on the sitcom The Hathaways during the 1961-1962 season. As Thelma Lou's "ugly" cousin in an episode of The Andy Griffith Show, she had an arranged blind date with Gomer Pyle, played by Jim Nabors. Her name on this episode was her actual name, Mary Grace. The episode was originally scheduled to air on November 25, 1963, but it was preempted by the coverage of the assassination of President John F. Kennedy three days earlier.

== Green Acres ==
Canfield was best known for her recurring role on the hit comedy series Green Acres as Ralph Monroe, the all-thumbs carpenter who greeted her fellow Hootervillians with her signature "Howdy Doody!" She appeared in more than 40 episodes of the show during its six-season run from 1965 to 1971. She reprised the role in the 1990 TV movie Return to Green Acres. Recalling the Ralph character in a 2006 interview, she said, "To be remembered for Ralph kind of upsets me—only in the sense that it was so easy and undemanding." She added, "It's being known for something easy to do instead of something you worked hard to achieve."

== Other roles ==
She guest-starred on The Eleventh Hour. In 1966, Canfield played Abner Kravitz's sister Harriet on four episodes of Bewitched. Actress Alice Pearce, who played Abner's wife, Gladys Kravitz, had died from ovarian cancer, and her successor as Mrs. Kravitz (Sandra Gould) had yet to be hired. During the early 1970s, Canfield and actress Lucille Wall shared the role of Lucille March on General Hospital. Canfield appeared in feature films such as Pollyanna (as "Angelica"), The St. Valentine's Day Massacre and Something Wicked This Way Comes.

== Later life and death ==
Canfield made her last public appearance in 2005 when she attended Eddie Albert's funeral with Green Acres co-stars Sid Melton and Frank Cady. Canfield died at age 89 from lung cancer on February 15, 2014, in Santa Barbara, California.

== Filmography ==
=== Film ===
Year	Title	Role	Notes
1959	That Kind of Woman	WAC on Train	Uncredited
1960	Pollyanna	Angelica	
1962	The Interns	Pharmacy Nurse	Uncredited
1963	Come Blow Your Horn	Mildred, Looking for JFK at Party	Uncredited
1967	Don't Make Waves	Seamstress	
1967	The St. Valentine's Day Massacre	Mrs. Doody	Uncredited
1975	Half a House	Thelma	
1983	Something Wicked This Way Comes	Miss Foley	
1988	South of Reno	Motel Manager	
1993	Young Goodman Brown	Goody Cloyse	(final film role)

=== Television ===
Year	Title	Role	Notes
1954	Goodyear Television Playhouse	Frances	Season 3 Episode 14: "Native Dancer"
1955	The Best of Broadway	Liesl	Season 1 Episode 7: "The Guardsman"
1955	Robert Montgomery Presents		Season 7 Episode 2: "Mr. and Mrs. Monroe"
1956	Robert Montgomery Presents		Season 8 Episode 2: "Onions in the Stew"
1956	Robert Montgomery Presents	Abigail Lewis	Season 8 Episode 7: "Goodbye, Grey Flannel"
1957	Robert Montgomery Presents		Season 8 Episode 38: "One Smart Apple"
1959	The Play of the Week	Sidonia	Season 1 Episode 6: "The Waltz of the Toreadors"
1961	Thriller	Celia Perry	Season 1 Episode 31: "A Good Imagination"
1961	Alfred Hitchcock Presents	Supermarket Customer (uncredited)	Season 7 Episode 2: "Bang! You're Dead"
1961	The Hathaways	Amanda Allison	Season 1 Episode 2: "Elinor Buys a Hat"
1961	The Hathaways	Amanda Allison	Season 1 Episode 4: "Elinor's Guilt"
1961	The Hathaways	Amanda Allison	Season 1 Episode 8: "TV or Not TV"
1962	The Hathaways	Amanda Allison	Season 1 Episode 18: "The Paint Job"
1962	The Hathaways	Amanda Allison	Season 1 Episode 22: "A Man for Amanda"
1962	Alfred Hitchcock Presents	Mrs. Cathy Carr (the Bookstore Customer)	Season 7 Episode 27: "Act of Faith"
1962	Thriller	Ally Rose	Season 2 Episode 20: "The Hollow Watcher"
1962	Hazel	Miss Simmons	Season 1 Episode 31: "Rock-A-Bye Baby"
1962	Poor Mr. Campbell	Grindl	TV movie
1963	The Joey Bishop Show	Mrs. Bennett	Season 2 Episode 25: "The Baby Formula"
1963	The Eleventh Hour	Mrs. Dobkin	Season 1 Episode 32: "The Middle Child Gets All the Aches"
1963	The Andy Griffith Show	Mary Grace Gossage	Season 4 Episode 10: "A Date for Gomer"
1964	Bob Hope Presents the Chrysler Theatre	Juliet	Season 1 Episode 16: "Wake Up, Darling"
1965	The Farmer's Daughter	Miss Hinkley	Season 3 Episode 13: "Jewel Beyond Compare"
1965–1971	Green Acres	Ralph Monroe	Recurring role (41 episodes)
1966	The Farmer's Daughter	Alice Goodall	Season 3 Episode 25: "Twelve Angry Women"
1966	Bewitched	Harriet Kravitz	Season 2 Episode 30: "Follow That Witch: Part 1"
1966	Bewitched	Harriet Kravitz	Season 2 Episode 31: "Follow That Witch: Part 2"
1966	Bewitched	Harriet Kravitz	Season 2 Episode 32: "A Bum Raps"
1966	Bewitched	Harriet Kravitz	Season 2 Episode 34: "Man's Best Friend"
1967	Vacation Playhouse	Mildred	Season 5 Episode 4: "Heaven Help Us"
1970	Adam-12	Susie Fisher	Season 3 Episode 10: "Log 135: Arson"
1973	Love, American Style	Bridgette	Season 5 Episode 4: "Love and the Games People Play"
1973	General Hospital	Lucille March	TV series, replacement for Lucille Wall
1976	Family	Mrs. Hanley	Season 2 Episode 1: "Coming Apart"
1976	Family	Mrs. Hanley	Season 2 Episode 3: "Home Movie"
1978	Tabitha	Dr. Morrison	Season 1 Episode 11: "Paul Goes to New York"
1984	Burning Rage	Nettie McFadden	TV movie
1985	Alice	Ruthie	Season 9 Episode 13: "The Night They Raided Debbie's"
1990	Return to Green Acres	Ralph Monroe	TV movie
1993	The Jackie Thomas Show	Jane	Season 1 Episode 18: "Aloha, Io-wahu"
