= Hooterville =

Fictional community

- First appearance: The Beverly Hillbillies
- Created by: Paul Henning
- Genre: Sitcom

In-universe information
- Type: Rural community
- Character: Sam Drucker
- Elevation: 1427

Hooterville is a fictional agricultural community that is the setting for the American situation comedies Petticoat Junction (1963–70) and Green Acres (1965–1971), two rural-oriented television series created or produced by Paul Henning for Filmways and CBS.

== Description ==
Prior to the airing of Petticoat Junction, Hooterville is mentioned in an early episode in the first season of The Beverly Hillbillies, another Paul Henning sitcom. In this episode, Jethrine Bodine, Jethro Bodine's sister (also played by Max Baer, Jr.), has a budding romance with a slick traveling salesman, Jasper, who invites her to a dance in Hooterville. Hooterville is a town, a valley, and a county, and has been described as "a place simultaneously Southern and Midwestern, but in a vague sort of way". Little concrete or reliable information can be gleaned from the two shows about the place, as references in individual episodes are rife with inconsistencies, contradictions, geographic impossibilities and continuity errors. The writers of the two shows often changed the details about the Hooterville community at will for the purpose of cracking a joke, and they left certain details (such as its home state) intentionally vague and unexplained.

== Citizens ==
The known citizens of Hooterville include:

- Oliver Wendell Douglas and Lisa Douglas - The new residents from New York City.
- Eb Dawson - The Douglas' farmhand.
- Newt Kiley - A farmer who farms over 80 acres (32 ha).
- Ben Miller - An apple farmer.
- Mr. Haney (first name disputed, Eustace or Charlton) - The county antiques dealer, huckster and con artist.
- Hank Kimball - The dimwitted repetitiously conversational county agent.
- Sam Drucker - The proprietor of Sam Drucker's General Store.
- Sarah Hotchkiss Trendell - The telephone operator.
- Alf and Ralph Monroe - Two siblings who work as carpenters. Despite Ralph's name and status as a brother, Ralph is a woman. Only Oliver Wendell Douglas questions the bizarre contradiction.
- Fred Ziffel - A pig farmer.
- Doris "Ruthie" Ziffel - Fred's shrewish wife.
- Arnold Ziffel - Fred and Doris's porcine "son".
- Charley Pratt and Floyd Smoot - The engineer and conductor, respectively, of the local train, the Hooterville Cannonball.

Kate Bradley, her Uncle Joe Carson, and her three daughters Betty Jo, Bobbie Jo, and Billie Jo reside at the Shady Rest Hotel which is 25 miles outside of Hooterville.

The citizens of Hooterville are out of touch with the times to the point of thinking that Calvin Coolidge is still President, although they later believe the current President to be Coolidge's successor Herbert Hoover. They are also quite provincial: they have never heard of the Federal income tax or tax refunds.

== Known locations ==
=== Drucker's Store ===
Sam Drucker is the proprietor of Hooterville's general store. It is the kind of old-fashioned store where the grocer retrieves many of the items from shelves behind the counter. Drucker sells typical food and household goods, and at times sells such oddities as nail polish that's also a bathtub sealant, as well as dehydrated chickens: "Just add water and bones, and let it sit for a couple hours." He also keeps a pickle barrel full of plastic pickles. Customers are allowed to shop on credit, although Drucker frequently (and exasperatedly) reminds them of their outstanding bills. Drucker's Store is the closest thing Hooterville has to a social club. The locals often come in to chit-chat, or to play checkers, or to rant and rave about community issues. And, on election day, they cast their votes at Drucker's. Exterior shots of the store show a sign that says "Sam Drucker's General Store", but everyone (including Sam Drucker) mostly calls the store either "Drucker's Store" or just "Drucker's".

==== Post office ====
The Hooterville post office is located in Drucker's Store. One of Sam Drucker's quirks is that he insists on putting on his official postal worker hat and standing behind a small regulation post office grille next to the register whenever his role switches from storekeeper to postmaster. Drucker takes great pride in his association with the Post Office Department, and he's also very pleased that his patrons must come to his store to get their mail. In the 1960s, rural post offices were often located in stores, and some still exist even today. The Green Acres fourth-season episode "Old Mail Day" is about the day when Sam Drucker cleans his store and Hootervillians gather to receive the lost old mail that he finds. A lost letter from 1917 informs Fred Ziffel that he has been drafted into the army to fight in World War I. There is no Rural Free Delivery (RFD) in Hooterville; when new resident Oliver Douglas petitions his Congressman for it to be initiated, Drucker is shocked to learn that an obscure (and fictitious) postal regulation requires him to carry the entire route himself— by bicycle. (This situation is, obviously, soon corrected.) In the 1990 made-for-television film Return to Green Acres, actor Frank Cady in character as Sam Drucker states that the Hooterville ZIP Code is 40516½; the real-life ZIP codes 40516 and 40517 are used by the city of Lexington, Kentucky.

=== Hooterville Volunteer Fire Department ===
The volunteer fire department is run by Fire Chief "Uncle Joe" Carson. The firefighters include Joe, Sam Drucker, Ralph and Alf Monroe, Mr. Haney and an assortment of other Hootervillians. Joe is also the conductor of the Hooterville Volunteer Fire Department Band, which is a brass ensemble marching band that includes Charley Pratt (trumpet), Floyd Smoot (tuba), Ben Miller (French horn), Grandpa Miller (cymbals), and Sam Drucker (bass drum). The only song the band ever plays is "Hot Time In The Old Town Tonight", and no matter how many times they rehearse it, they always play the song at half-speed and somewhat off-key. In the Green Acres episode "I Didn't Raise My Husband to be a Fireman", Oliver Douglas learns that a person has to be able to play an instrument in order to join the fire department. Joe Carson says this is because Hooterville has more parades than fires. Indeed, the Fire Department Band is seen more often on the shows than actual fire emergencies. The band actually pre-dates the fire department; it was used in fundraisers to help establish the department.

=== Tourist attractions and events ===
The local tourist attractions and events seen and referred to on Petticoat Junction and Green Acres give a (sometimes humorous) picture of old-fashioned small-town life:

- Newt Kiley's two-headed rooster (before it died)
- Mr. Haney's monkey racing track
- The Shady Rest Hotel's annual Horseshoe Tournament
- Kate Bradley's annual Shady Rest Jamboree
- The Hooterville Centennial Celebration (1968)
- Old Mail Day at Drucker's Store
- The Spring Festival
- The annual Hooterville Founders' Day Celebration
- The Hooterville County Fair

== Appearances ==
=== Petticoat Junction ===
Petticoat Junction (1963–1970) is based on the Burris Hotel, a real hotel that existed in Eldon, Missouri. Paul Henning, the producer and creator of the show, was married to the granddaughter of the owner of the hotel and often visited. The Burris hotel became the "Shady Rest Hotel" on Petticoat Junction. The Shady Rest is located 25 miles (40 km) down the tracks from "downtown" Hooterville, just inside the Hooterville county line. In one episode, it is revealed that the Shady Rest was built right on the county line between Hooterville county and Pixley county. The situation is solved when the Hooterville Cannonball tows the hotel several feet until it is fully within the Hooterville boundary. The hotel is run by widow Kate Bradley (played by Bea Benaderet) and her lazy-but-lovable uncle, Uncle Joe Carson (Edgar Buchanan). Kate has three daughters, "boy crazy" Billie Jo (Jeannine Riley, 1963–1965; Gunilla Hutton, 1965–1966; Meredith MacRae, 1967–1970), sexy bookworm Bobbie Jo (Pat Woodell, 1963–1965; Lori Saunders, 1965–1970), and "tomboy" Betty Jo (Linda Kaye Henning, 1963–1970). From 1968 to 1970, actress June Lockhart played Dr. Janet Craig, whose office was behind the register desk of the Shady Rest.

=== Green Acres ===
Green Acres (1965–1971) is about a wealthy New York City couple, lawyer Oliver Wendell Douglas (Eddie Albert) and his diamond-clad wife, Lisa (Eva Gabor), who give up their Park Avenue penthouse for a run-down farm, "The Old Haney Place". In Green Acres Hooterville is portrayed as a much more wacky, surreal place than it is in Petticoat Junction. Though the shows share some characters, the humor in Green Acres is often far broader. The major overlap between the two shows is shopkeeper–postman–newsman Sam Drucker. In this series, the town is said to be named after Horace Hooter, who founded the town in 1868. According to Green Acres, Hooterville is in "the kangaroo state". When Oliver visits the governor, the governor gives him a plushie kangaroo as state memorabilia. Lisa consistently mispronounces the name of the town as "Hootersville". A running gag is that Hooterville is so remote that the only way to get there is by parachute. However, a plot hole shows that Hooterville is connected on a railroad and has a nearby airport in Pixley.

== Population and elevation inconsistencies ==
On the series Petticoat Junction, Hooterville appears to be a fairly large town, able to support a high school and several other institutions. In 1963, the county has a population of around 3,000 citizens. And the sign at the Hooterville railroad station says that the town is situated at an elevation of 1,427 feet (435 m). However, on Green Acres, the population of Hooterville is said to be much smaller and the elevation much lower. In the episode "The Youth Center", general store owner Sam Drucker says that a sign showing the population as 48 and the elevation as 23 inches (58 cm) is incorrect since two young people recently moved away and the elevation is down to 18 inches (46 cm). When Oliver Douglas asks him how the elevation could change, Sam explains that "Hooterville is subject to sinking spells." Oliver refers to Hooterville as being "2 1/2 inches above sea level" in the Green Acres episode "Lisa's Jam Session".

== Location of Hooterville ==
The exact location of Hooterville is never stated on Petticoat Junction or Green Acres. "The weather in Texas" is mentioned in the episode "A Cottage for Two: Part 3", when Kate is talking to the girls about their father. He would go fishing, pitch horseshoes, and talk about the weather in Texas, she tells them in a conversation. The shows are rife with conflicting clues, so assigning a location will never be decisive. It cannot even be determined if Hooterville is in the east or the west of the United States. In the Green Acres episode "Music to Milk By", the call letters of the nearby Pixley radio station that Eb Dawson listens to begin with the letter W, rather than K, suggesting that Pixley and Hooterville are east of the Mississippi River. The Pixley television station's call letters are WPIXL, which would put it east of the river. (There were some early exceptions to the W and K nomenclature.) Even the outsiders within the fictional world of the shows have a hard time locating the town. Hooterville is so obscure that in one episode a fly covers it on a map; in another episode the only way a government bureaucrat can get to Hooterville is by parachute. In season 2, episode 9 – "The Hooterville Image" – Mr. Haney is talking with Mr. Ziffel, Mr. Kiley, and Mr. Drucker about the suits that Oliver wears while farming. Mr. Haney states that tourists see Oliver and think they are still in the outskirts of Chicago.

During the Jethrine Bodine "crossover," Jed Clampett noted that he had never heard of the town before Granny mentioned it, indicating it is nowhere near the Clampett family's original shack (the location of which has also been the subject of speculation).

=== Possible Hooterville locations ===
Missouri

The original inspiration for Petticoat Junction came from Paul Henning's wife, Ruth. As a child, Ruth traveled by train to her grandparents' hotel in Eldon, Missouri. Other than the hotel and the train, though, there is little resemblance between Hooterville and Eldon, Missouri. One of the pre-production working titles for Petticoat Junction was Ozark Widow. In one episode, the characters on The Beverly Hillbillies go back home to find a husband for Elly Mae. "Back home" turns out to be the Missouri Ozarks theme park Silver Dollar City, which is treated as a real town on the show.

Adjacent to Tennessee

At one point, Granny from The Beverly Hillbillies visits Hooterville and wants to marry Sam Drucker. When she is asked how she knows Sam Drucker, she replies "We is neighbors!" and then explains that Hooterville is just over the state line from her home state of Tennessee. According to this clue, Hooterville is in one of the eight states that border Tennessee–Missouri, Kentucky, Virginia, North Carolina, Georgia, Alabama, Mississippi or Arkansas.

North Carolina

Of the eight states that border Tennessee, only North Carolina includes the Great Smoky Mountains, where Granny says she is from: "When I was a girl back in Tennessee, I set so many boys' hearts on fire that they took to calling that neck of the woods The Smoky Mountains." So is it Hooterville, North Carolina? It is not the most popular guess, or the only guess, but it does follow a major bit of storyline affecting two different shows. It is worth mentioning that the town of Hendersonville, North Carolina, which is in about the right location, actually refers to itself as "Hooterville". (Although that may or may not be because of Green Acres. The link leads to one local author's explanation of why they call themselves "Hooterville," in which he states that the origin of the name pre-dates the show.)

Kentucky

In some ways, the best argument is for Kentucky. Sam Drucker, Hooterville grocer and postmaster, gives the ZIP Code for Hooterville as 40516½ in the 1990 reunion movie Return to Green Acres. 40516 is a ZIP Code for Lexington, Kentucky, a city 375 miles (604 km) from Chicago. The character Mr. Haney on Green Acres says that Chicago is nearly 300 miles (480 km) away from Hooterville. Mr. Haney mentioned the "High Flyer Diner" — owned by one of his cousins — being on "Highway 27". US Route 27 passes through Lexington, Kentucky, and most importantly, right along the boundary of ZIP Code 40516. In the Petticoat Junction episode "Betty Jo's Dog", they talk of sending the dog back on the train to Louisville. Also, Lexington, Kentucky, is near Springfield, Kentucky, and a nearby town of Hooterville is called "Springfield". That is the most common place name in the U.S., but the shows have frequent references to Bug Tussle or Bugtussle (sometimes identified as Granny's hometown), and that is the name of a place on KY 87 in Monroe County, Kentucky, on the Tennessee border west of Gamaliel. One argument against Kentucky is that one episode says the county seat is 75 miles from Hooterville, and no Kentucky county is that large.

Pennsylvania

The name Hooterville approximates Hooverville, a term used for the shantytowns that emerged during the Great Depression. But it also approximates Hooversville, Pennsylvania, a bucolic town on railroad tracks in western Pennsylvania. Also, characters on Green Acres visit New York City on occasion and apparently return within a day's time.

A Confederate state

In the Petticoat Junction episode "The Valley's New Owner", it is revealed that Hooterville was in a Confederate state during the Civil War—South Carolina, Mississippi, Alabama, Georgia, Texas, Virginia, Arkansas, Tennessee, North Carolina, Florida and Louisiana. Although Missouri and Kentucky were Union states during the war, they were claimed and for a time partially controlled by the Confederacy, which resulted in 13 stars on its battle flag

North Dakota

An early scene in the 90-minute series pilot (a two-hour presentation with commercials) takes place in the board room of the C&FW Railroad Company, which operates the steam-powered Hooterville Cannonball and the 50-mile (80 km) spur between the hamlets of Hooterville and Pixley upon which it runs. The senior management team of the C&FW are gathered for a presentation by (presumably) the president of the company, Norman Curtis, in which he proudly exclaims that the "super-charged diesel locomotive," a large model of which is on the conference room table, "is now standard equipment on the entire C&FW system." The curtains are then pulled on the back wall of the conference room (by none other than Homer Bedloe) to reveal a map of the C&FW Railroad line. The map shows that the C&FW system serves the northern Great Plains area of the United States, from Lake Superior in the east, into Montana and Wyoming in the west, as far south (but no farther) than Nebraska, and as far north as the Dakotas. The newly-updated C&FW system is indicated with broad lines on the map, with all of the towns along the mainline indicated with white dots. As Curtis proudly points to the map, calling the C&FW the "most modern, most progressive ...," he is stopped short by a small scrawl on the map. When the camera zooms in, the scrawl turns out to be the cut-off spur line between the towns of Hooterville and Pixley, which the map clearly registers as being in south-central North Dakota.

=== Hooterville is not in these states ===
Hooterville is not in New York, based on two episodes from season one of Green Acres. In episode 21, "What's in a Name?", Ralph Monroe wishes to have her name changed to Sophia. When Oliver presents his petition to the court, he is informed by the judge that "this state does not have a reciprocal agreement with New York State. Therefore, your credentials are not acceptable. You are not authorized to practice law in this state." In episode 24, "The Deputy", Oliver points out the license plate on his Lincoln Continental to Officer Heston Haney, a blue and yellow New York plate 4G-8561. Officer Haney says "Oh, New York plates, huh. You live there?" to which Oliver replies "No, I live here". When Officer Haney finds out that Oliver has lived in the state for 7 months he writes Oliver a citation stating "We have a law. All out-of-state residents who reside in state more than six months are required to replace their out-of-state plates with in-state." When handing Oliver the ticket Officer Haney says "Now there you are, there's your in-state traffic citation for havin' out-of-state plates."

Hooterville is not in Kansas, Nebraska, South Dakota, Connecticut, or Indiana, based on character comments in the third season of Green Acres. Each of these states is referred to by characters as being elsewhere. Also, given its elevation of 1,427 feet (as seen on the sign in the railroad station), Hooterville is too low to be in Colorado, Montana, New Mexico, Utah, or Wyoming, and too high to be in Delaware, Florida, Illinois, Indiana, Louisiana, or Rhode Island.

Hooterville is not in any state that didn't exist prior to the end of the American Civil War, nor any state that wasn't part of the Confederacy, with the possible exceptions of Missouri, Kentucky, or West Virginia. This is proven in the episode of Petticoat Junction entitled "The Valley's New Owner" (S7 Ep18). While discussing a deed showing Orrin Pike was the owner of the entire Hooterville Valley, Dr. Janet Craig says to Orrin Pike "the Confederate governor that signed this, gave away land that he didn't own."

=== Real cities within 500 miles ===
In numerous episodes, it is said that they are close to Chicago. In one Green Acres episode, Mr. Haney says that Chicago is nearly 300 miles (480 km) away. Eldon, Missouri, the inspiration for the show, is right at 350 miles (560 km), as the crow flies, from Chicago. Numerous cities and towns are nearly 300 miles from Chicago in the states of Illinois, Iowa, Missouri, Michigan, Minnesota, Indiana, Ohio, Wisconsin, and Kentucky. In one Petticoat Junction episode, Billie Jo talks about going to the big city Omaha, Nebraska, and in another Uncle Joe talks about going to Sioux City, Iowa. In the first episode of the series a map shows the railroad line surrounding Hooterville, it appears to be a branch line with the two closes cities on the main line being Skidmore and Melton both locations in Missouri with the first being a city and the latter an unincorporated town in the Ozarks. In Season 5, episode 20, Uncle Joe talks about a time when a "hayseed" from Mason City ran off with a girl that owned a factory in Dubuque, both of which are real towns in Iowa. Also, later in Season 5, in episode 29, Sam Drucker mentions a guy from Cedar Falls which is a real Iowa town 75 miles to the South-East of Mason City and 100 miles due West of Dubuque. Additionally, it is often said that a nearby town is called Springfield, which could mean Springfield, Illinois, Springfield, Missouri, or the Springfield Township, Cedar County, Iowa. However, "Springfield" is a common (and geographically ambiguous) fictional city name on television, as seen in such shows as The Simpsons, Guiding Light, and Father Knows Best.

=== Fictional nearby towns ===
A larger nearby town is called "Pixley", and there is an ongoing rivalry between the two communities. Pixley is the closest town to Hooterville, about 50 miles away. Pixley comically boasts several things that no small farm town in America would have. Among them are a very tiny international airport (Pixley International Airport, the hub of Trans Pixley Airlines) and a television station, WPIXL, Channel 5. Other towns in the area include Crabwell Corners (about 5–8 miles (13 km) away), Stankwell Falls (distance never stated), Bug Tussle or Bugtussle (about 20–25 miles (40 km) away), Bleedswell (distance never stated), the unnamed county seat (about 75 miles (121 km) away), Springfield (distance never stated), Appleville (300 miles away), and the unnamed state capital (500 miles away).

In Season 4, Episode 12 of Green Acres, "How to Get from Hooterville to Pixley Without Moving", the Douglas' farmhouse is thought to be in Pixley and the barn in Hooterville. By the episode's end, we learn there was an error and the farmhouse is in Hooterville after all. The barn is in Pixley and much to Oliver's surprise, the rest of his farm is in Crabwell Corners, so the three towns must be of large physical areas. It is possible one or more of these were not "towns" as such but "Census Designated Places"; a CDP can cover a very large area yet only have a few dozen residents, whose street address, PO Box, and phone will be listed in that "town".

In Season 1, Episode 1 of Petticoat Junction, the C. & F. W. Railroad map shows that the Hooterville to Pixley branch line was at one time connected to the rail line that ran from Melton (to the west on the main line) and Skidmore (to the east on the main line). Also seen on the map is Delta, a town on the rail line that is located south of Melton.

In one episode of Petticoat Junction, surveyors determine that the Shady Rest Hotel was built on top of the city boundary line between Hooterville and Pixley. This could imply that the two towns are much closer together than originally thought, but it may also reflect the geography of the northeastern or midwestern U.S., in which most of the land area is assigned to a town. Or, it could refer to separate districts on the county legislative body.

There is a story that Hooterville is actually a Hollywood reinterpretation of “Porterville” in Tulare County, a farming community north of Los Angeles. This seems likely as the actual town of Pixley is not far from Porterville, and there is even a named place listed on some maps, south of Porterville, that is called Green Acres.

== Popular culture ==
An episode of the television series Two and a Half Men is titled "It Never Rains in Hooterville". In the episode, Alan Harper tells his brother Charlie about his disastrous rainy camp night with his son Jake. Charlie asks where Jake is now, and Alan says that he went with his friends to Hooterville, to which Charlie replies "It never rains in Hooterville".

In the song "The Revolution Will Not Be Televised", singer Gil Scott-Heron refers to "Green Acres, Beverly Hillbillies, and Hooterville Junction" as symbols of mainstream viewing habits that "will no longer be so damned relevant" when the "Revolution" comes. This song was in turn referenced as a plot device in the 2025 film One Battle After Another, in which some of the lines are used as a code phrase between a group of revolutionaries.
