= Arnold Ziffel =

- Green Acres character
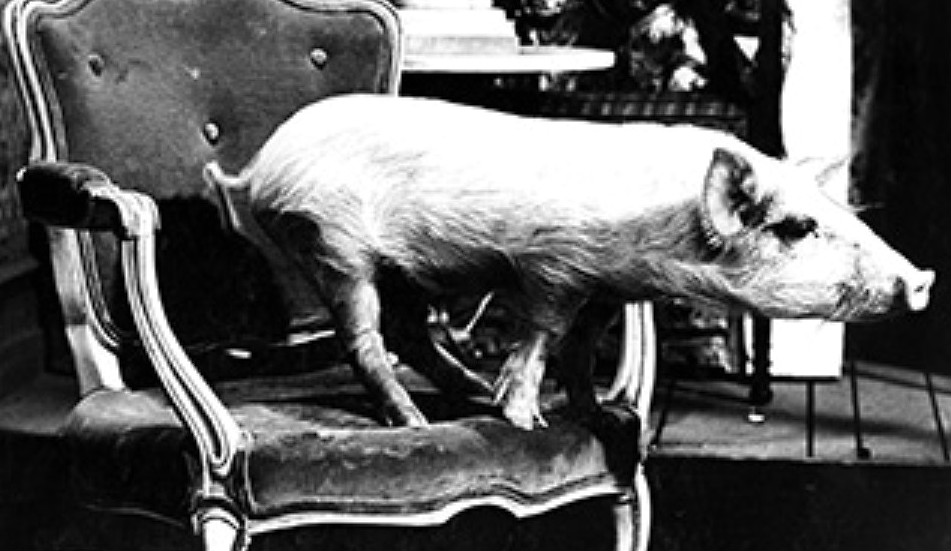
- Arnold Ziffel, 1967
- Created by: Paul Henning
- Voiced by: Frank Welker (in Return to Green Acres)

In-universe information
- Species: Domestic pig
- Gender: Male

Arnold Ziffel is a fictional pig featured in Green Acres, an American situation comedy that aired on CBS from 1965 to 1971. The show is about a fictional lawyer, Oliver Wendell Douglas, and his wife, Lisa – city-dwellers who move to Hooterville, a farming community populated by oddballs. Arnold is a pig of the Chester White breed, but is treated as the son of farmer Fred Ziffel and his wife, Doris, a childless couple. Everyone in Hooterville (besides Oliver Douglas) accepts this without question. Arnold's first TV appearance is in the second season of Petticoat Junction, in the episode "A Matter of Communication".

== Situations ==
The humor that surrounds the character of Arnold comes from his human-like abilities and lifestyle, and from the way the people of Hooterville insist on thinking of him as a fellow human. They invite him to town meetings, they play checkers with him (and lose), and they speak English to him and can understand him when he speaks with pig squeals and grunts. New resident Oliver Douglas is the lone holdout. He tries to explain to people that Arnold is just a pig, but no one will listen to him. On the contrary, they are suspicious of Oliver, because of his inability to communicate with Arnold. This dynamic is part of a larger theme of Green Acres, that Oliver's sense of logic is meaningless in the Hooterville universe.

Arnold can do pretty much anything a human can. He can write his name and change channels on the television. He watches the CBS Evening News with Walter Cronkite to keep up with the issues. He signs checks and can adjust the TV antenna, and he is the smartest student at the local grade school. He carries his lunchbox in his mouth, and often plays practical jokes on the other students. Arnold is also artistically talented: he is working on a novel, he plays the piano, and he is an accomplished abstract painter, dubbed "Porky Picasso", whose piece titled "Nude at a Filling Station" wins first prize out of two thousand entries in a student art contest. He even works as a "paper pig" delivering newspapers, although he has a bad habit of throwing copies so hard and so badly aimed that he sometimes breaks windows.

Arnold is very lucky. He wins a trip to Hawaii in one episode, and a trip to Hollywood in another. After a Hollywood screen test, he is cast in a role originally intended for a horse, but after the horse, implied to be Mr. Ed, explains to Arnold that he needs the job to send his son to Stanford, Arnold's deliberate bad behavior leads to him being fired and the horse getting his job back. He also wins a prize at the Pixley Bijou movie theater for having the most original costume... the theater manager says that Arnold has the best looking pig costume he has ever seen.

At one point, Arnold falls in love with Mr. Haney's prized Basset Hound "Cynthia", but in a scene full of pig grunts and dog barks, subtitles explain that they realize their love can never be. Mr. Haney threatens to sue Arnold's "father" Fred Ziffel, claiming that Arnold has ruined Cynthia for dog shows since she has begun to grunt like a pig, too.

One storyline has Arnold inheriting millions of dollars as the sole descendant of the favorite pig of a pork-packing magnate, distinguished by his ability to predict the weather with his tail. Some doubt exists as to Arnold's weather prediction skills when, during the claims process for the money, his tail predicts snow in the middle of warm weather. This prediction is disbelieved and Oliver finds himself in a difficult situation checking out of an expensive hotel, because he has to deal with Arnold's expensive bill being deemed Arnold's "Pig Lawyer" by the town of Hooterville. However, during this difficulty, Arnold's seemingly impossible prediction proves accurate when a freak snowstorm buries the city. So the hotel welcomes Arnold back with open arms.

== Behind the scenes ==
Arnold's trainer was Frank Inn, who trained virtually all of the animals seen in the rural television comedies of the time period, including Petticoat Junction and The Beverly Hillbillies. Inn said that he had to use delicate psychology to train his pigs. Unlike other animals, he explained, a trainer can never force a pig to do anything or reprimand them, or else they will come to dislike the trainer and will not perform for them or even take food from them. Arnold won three Patsy Awards for Inn during the 1960s.

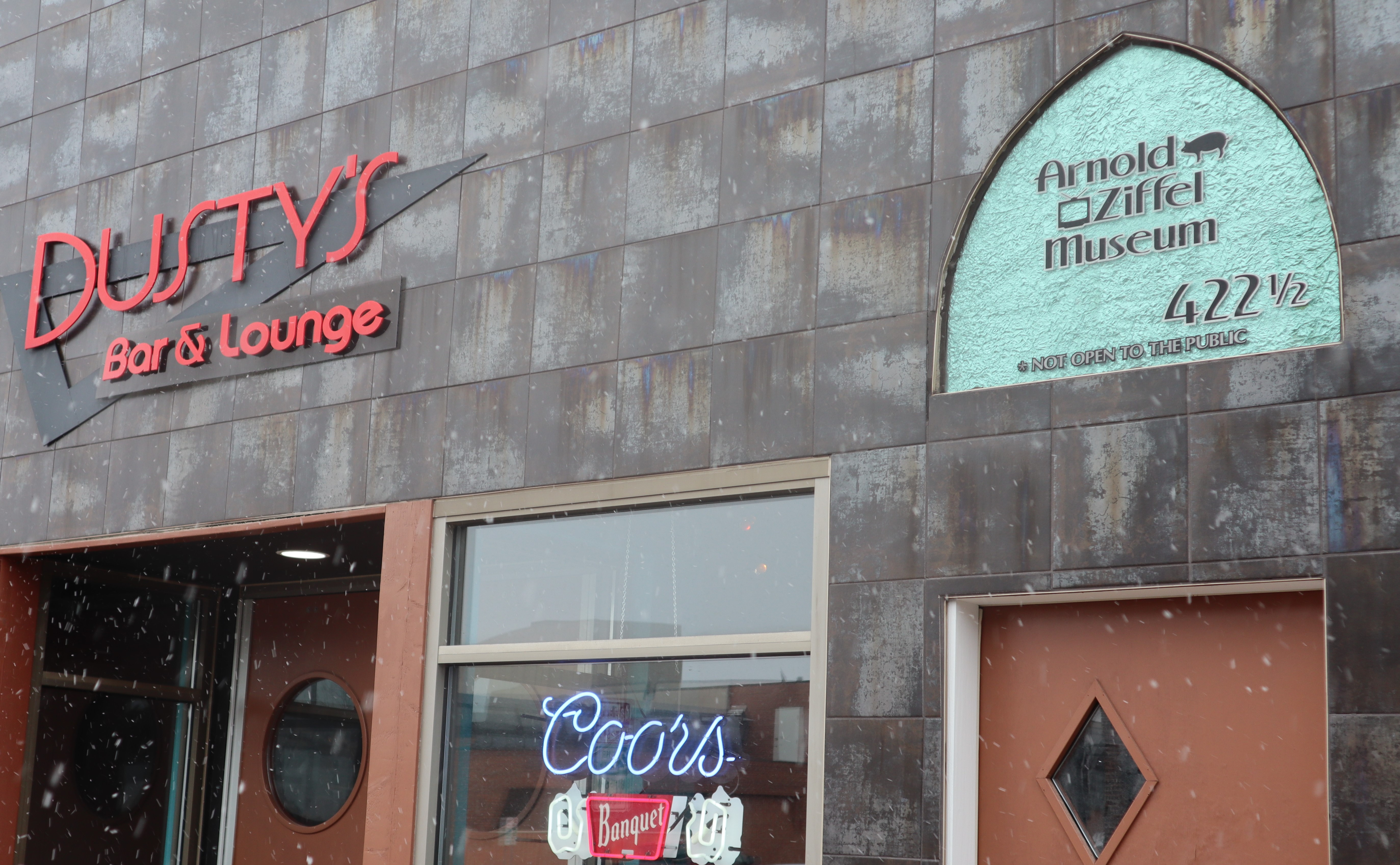
"Arnold Ziffel Museum (*not open to the public)" between a bar and the Spam Museum in Minnesota.

Arnold was actually played by a piglet, and, since piglets quickly grow into adult pigs, at least one piglet per year had to be trained for the role of Arnold during the six years that the show was in production. In most episodes, Arnold was played by a female piglet. The piglet was paid $250 per day and had a union contract.

Arnold received a great deal of fan mail from children as well as adults. A class of sixth-graders from Ohio wrote with a pledge to stop eating pork chops.

One of the Arnolds is buried with Inn at Forest Lawn Memorial Park (Hollywood Hills).

At least one Arnold came from a farm in Union Star, Missouri.

== Influence on popular culture ==
A popular urban legend circulated during the era of the show's greatest popularity to the effect that the cast and crew of Green Acres butchered then ate Arnold. The story is false.

In Quentin Tarantino's 1994 film Pulp Fiction, Arnold is referenced in the ending diner scene.

In the 1995–1999 American sitcom NewsRadio, the central character, news director Dave Nelson, is a fan of Green Acres and of Arnold in particular.
