= Green Acres =

American television sitcom (1965–1971)

- Oliver, Lisa, and Arnold on a season 3 DVD cover
- Created by: Jay Sommers
- Written by: Jay Sommers; Dick Chevillat
- Directed by: Richard L. Bare
- Starring: Eddie Albert; Eva Gabor; Pat Buttram; Tom Lester; Frank Cady; Hank Patterson; Barbara Pepper; Fran Ryan; Alvy Moore
- Theme music composer: Vic Mizzy
- Composer: Vic Mizzy
- Country of origin: United States
- No. of seasons: 6
- No. of episodes: 170 (list of episodes)

Production
- Executive producer: Paul Henning
- Producer: Jay Sommers
- Camera setup: Single-camera
- Running time: 25 minutes
- Production company: Filmways

Original release
- Network: CBS
- Release: September 15, 1965 – April 27, 1971

Related
- The Beverly Hillbillies; Petticoat Junction

Green Acres is an American television absurdist sitcom starring Eddie Albert and Eva Gabor as a couple who move from New York City to a country farm. Produced by Filmways as a sister show to Petticoat Junction, the series was first broadcast on CBS, from September 15, 1965, to April 27, 1971.

Although it received solid ratings during its six-year run, Green Acres was cancelled in 1971 as part of the "rural purge" by CBS. The sitcom has been in syndication and is available on DVD and VHS releases. A reunion movie aired in 1990.

In 1997, the two-part episode "A Star Named Arnold Is Born" was ranked No. 59 on TV Guide's 100 Greatest Episodes of All Time.

== Radio origins ==
Green Acres derives from Granby's Green Acres, a comedy show aired on the CBS radio network from July 3 to August 21, 1950. The eight-episode summer series was created by Jay Sommers, who also wrote, produced, and directed.

The principal characters, a married couple played by Bea Benaderet and Gale Gordon, were based on similar characters played by the two on Lucille Ball's My Favorite Husband. The Granby's premise sees a big-city banker fulfill a lifelong dream by moving his family to a rundown farm, despite knowing nothing about farming. The nearby feed store is operated by the absent-minded Mr. Kimball, and the Granbys hire an older hand named Eb (voiced by Parley Baer, who guest-starred in several episodes of the television series), who often comments on their incompetent management. Benaderet later played Kate Bradley, a main character in Petticoat Junction, which was in the same fictional universe as Green Acres.

== Adaptation to television ==
Following the success of The Beverly Hillbillies and Petticoat Junction, CBS offered producer Paul Henning another half-hour slot on the schedule, without requiring a pilot episode. Faced with running three shows, Henning encouraged Sommers to create a series for the time slot. Sommers later wrote and produced about one-third of the episodes.

In pre-production, proposed titles were Country Cousins and The Eddie Albert Show.

== Premise ==
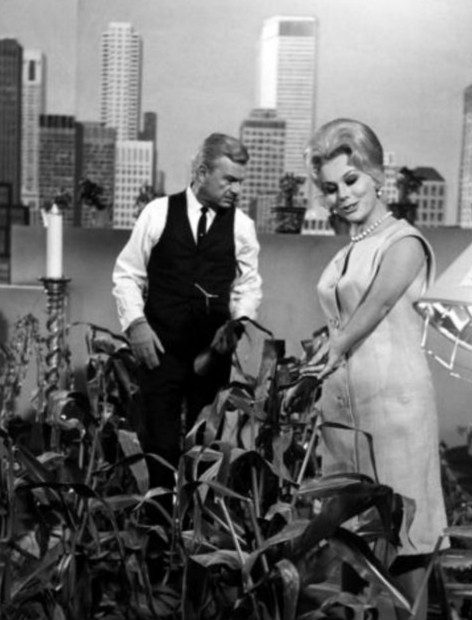
Publicity photo for the premiere of the show

Green Acres is about Oliver Wendell Douglas (Eddie Albert), a prominent and wealthy New York City attorney, fulfilling his dream to be a farmer, and Lisa Douglas (Eva Gabor), his glamorous Hungarian wife, uprooted unwillingly from an upscale Manhattan penthouse apartment to a dilapidated farm in Hooterville that Oliver purchases from the ever-hustling Mr. Haney, to the disbelief of the residents.

The debut episode is a mockumentary about their decision to move to a rural area, anchored by former ABC newscaster John Charles Daly. Daly was the host of the CBS game show What's My Line?, and a few weeks after the show's debut Albert and Gabor returned the favor by appearing on What's My Line? as that episode's Mystery Guests, and publicly thanked Daly for helping to launch their series.

Although many Green Acres episodes were still standard 1960s sitcom fare, the show developed a regular undercurrent of surrealism and satire. The writers soon developed a suite of running jokes and visual gags, and characters often broke the fourth wall, such as looking around to try and figure out where the fife music is coming from when Oliver launches into one of his frequent "American dream" monologues.

The show is set in the same television universe as Henning's Petticoat Junction, featuring such towns as Hooterville, Pixley, Crabwell Corners, and Stankwell Falls, as well as sharing characters such as Joe Carson, Fred and Doris Ziffel, Sam Drucker, Newt Kiley, and Floyd Smoot.

=== Theme song ===
The main theme, composed by Vic Mizzy, is notable as an unusual example of a television theme song in which the lyrics are sung by the stars of the show (Albert and Gabor), rather than by anonymous session vocalists.

== Characters ==
=== Main characters ===
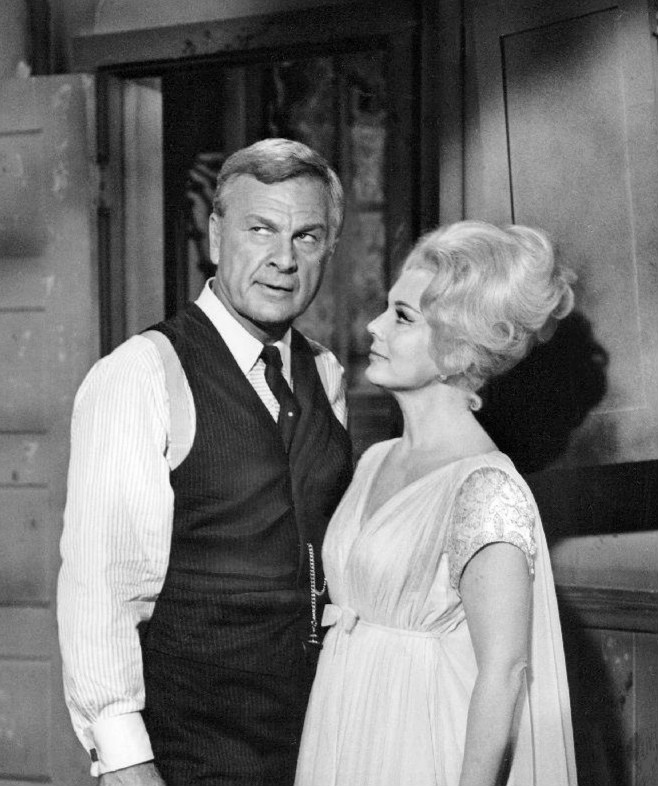
Eddie Albert and Eva Gabor as Oliver and Lisa Douglas

- Oliver Wendell Douglas (portrayed by Eddie Albert): Named for Oliver Wendell Holmes, he is an attorney who makes the rash decision to leave his successful law practice and pursue his lifelong dream of being a farmer, despite having no real-world knowledge or experience, as evidenced by him doing farm chores while wearing a three-piece suit (in "The Hooterville Image", the denizens decide Oliver is ruining the town's image by doing his chores in a suit and demand that he wear overalls). Much of the humor throughout the series derives from Oliver's striving toward success and happiness in an absurd situation, despite the rural citizenry, his high-maintenance wife, and his affluent mother (Eleanor Audley), who ridicules him for his agricultural pipedreams in the episode "The Wedding Anniversary". Oliver is also subjected to ribbing by the Hootervillians when he launches into starry-eyed monologues about "the American farmer"—replete with a fife playing "Yankee Doodle" in the background (which every on-screen character except Oliver can hear). Oliver drives a Lincoln Continental convertible, a stark contrast to the often decrepit vintage vehicles generally shown. In later seasons, the Lincoln is replaced by a Mercury Marquis convertible.
- Lisa Douglas (portrayed by Eva Gabor): Lisa and Oliver are both veterans of World War II. In "Wings Over Hooterville", she recalls how they met. According to Lisa, she was a sergeant in the Hungarian underground, and he was a United States Army Air Forces flier, forced to bail out of his plane. However, she gives several other fanciful versions of how they met in subsequent episodes. In the episode, "A Royal Love Story", he is a tourist in Paris, and she is a waitress/tour guide, living with her father, the deposed King of Hungary. Pampered by her wealthy family, her skewed world view and domestic ignorance provide fertile ground for recurring gags. Instead of washing dishes, Lisa sometimes tosses them out the kitchen window. In the episode, "Alf and Ralph Break Up", Lisa admits she has no cooking abilities and that her only talent is Zsa Zsa Gabor impersonations (the real-life sisters were often mistaken for each other).

Oliver and Lisa are both depicted as fish out of water. While Oliver instigated the move from Manhattan to Hooterville over Lisa's objections, he is typically uncomprehending of and impatient with his new situation. Lisa, on the other hand, somehow understands the sometimes surreal world of their neighbors, and they in turn are accepting of her own bizarre notions.

=== Supporting characters ===
- Mr. Eustace Haney (portrayed by Pat Buttram): The oily, dishonest antique dealer, huckster, and Con artist who originally sold Oliver the Green Acres Farm (previously the Old Haney Place). In the early episodes, Haney repeatedly profits from Oliver by removing all the farm's basic fittings and equipment (the kitchen sink, bath, stove, cow, tractor, plow, etc.), and selling or renting them back to Oliver at wildly inflated prices. In succeeding episodes, Haney invariably arrives on cue every time Oliver needs an item or service, typically accompanied by a custom-made sign for each occasion, painted on a green pull-down window shade. Pat Buttram later revealed that Haney's character was inspired by Elvis Presley's manager Colonel Tom Parker.
- Eb Dawson (portrayed by Tom Lester): The amiable, somewhat naïve, sarcastic young farmhand to the Douglases. He habitually addresses the Douglases as "Dad" and "Mom", much to Oliver's annoyance.
- Fred Ziffel (portrayed by Hank Patterson) and Doris Ziffel (portrayed by Barbara Pepper 1965–1968, Fran Ryan 1969–1971): Fred and Doris are the Douglases' childless elderly neighbors. They have a pig named Arnold, whom they treat as their son. Fred is a cantankerous old-fashioned pig farmer who was born during the Grover Cleveland administration and Doris is a homemaker and co-proprietor of the pig farm. Everything about him is "no-nonsense", except for the fact that his "son" Arnold is a pig.
- Arnold Ziffel: Arnold is a pig whom the Ziffels treat as a son, understands English, lives indoors, and is pampered. Everyone understands Arnold when he grunts, as if he were speaking English, except Oliver. He is an avid TV watcher and a Western fan, attends the local grade school (carrying his book pack in his mouth), and signs his own name on paper. Only Oliver believes Arnold is just livestock, although he frequently slips and begins treating him as a boy. Arnold makes regular appearances throughout the series, often visiting the Douglas home to watch their TV.
- Alf and Ralph Monroe (portrayed by Sid Melton and Mary Grace Canfield): Alf and his "brother" Ralph are two quarrelsome carpenters. In the episode that introduces them, Alf confesses that Ralph is actually his sister and explains they would not get jobs if people knew that she is a woman. The Monroes rarely finish projects and those that they do complete are disasters such as the Douglases' bedroom closet's sliding door that is always falling down, their unsuccessful attempts to secure the doorknob to the front door, etc. In one episode after accidentally sawing Sam Drucker's telephone line at the general store, they splice it back together, although backwards, causing Drucker to listen at the mouthpiece and talk into the receiver. Melton left in 1970 (season four) to do Make Room For Granddaddy, so the writers developed an occasional subplot that involved sister Ralph's attempts to win the affections of "Hanky" Kimball or some other hapless Hooterville bachelor. Alf later returns for Ralph's failed wedding to Kimball.
- Sam Drucker (portrayed by Frank Cady): A shopkeeper who is a regular character in both Petticoat Junction and Green Acres. Drucker also serves as a newspaper editor and printer, volunteer firefighter with the Hooterville Volunteer Fire Department, notary, constable, justice of the peace, and postmaster. Sam is the editor of the Hooterville World Guardian, the valley's only newspaper. Drucker is often the only character who is inspired by Oliver's rural patriotism. He is arguably the most "normal" of the Hooterville citizenry and he often filters Oliver's idealism to the townsfolk and, conversely, filters the plebeian backwoods notions of the community back to Oliver.
- Hank Kimball (portrayed by Alvy Moore): A broad parody of regional government bureaucrats and civil service employees, Hank is an often confused county agricultural agent who draws folks into inane conversations, loses his train of thought, then exits the scene. Kimball often begins a conversation, then questions the veracity of his own statements and ends up making a statement totally opposite from his original comment. The series was reportedly one of the first pre-recorded sitcoms to use teleprompters extensively during filming and Moore later recounted that he found them invaluable when performing Kimball's convoluted, rambling, rapid-fire dialogue.
- Eunice Douglas (portrayed by Eleanor Audley): Eunice is Oliver's mother, who seems to side with her daughter-in-law far more than her son. She is aghast at the prospect of Oliver and Lisa moving to Hooterville and often tries to convince Lisa to come back to New York City with her (or as she puts it, "Come back to America") and escape the primitive life of the farm. Eunice is a recurring character on the first four seasons of the show. Audley was cast as Oliver's mother despite only being five months older than Eddie Albert. Her role has been compared to the recurring character she also played on The Beverly Hillbillies, Millicent Schuyler-Potts, headmistress of the Potts School where Jethro attends the fifth and sixth grades.
- Lori Baker (portrayed by Victoria Paige Meyerink): A young girl who lives with her aunt and visited Hooterville with four other kids. After the other kids went home, she stayed with Oliver and Lisa for a while.

=== The folks from Petticoat Junction ===
Shady Rest Hotel owner Kate Bradley (portrayed by Bea Benaderet) appears in a few early episodes. She tries to help Lisa adapt to country living, most notably giving her the recipe for her hotcakes, which Lisa ends up botching, resulting in Lisa's infamous "hotscakes". Uncle Joe Carson (portrayed by Edgar Buchanan) is seen at times playing checkers, loafing, or mooching fruit at Drucker's Store with Petticoat Junction regulars Newt Kiley (portrayed by Kay E. Kuter) and train conductor Floyd Smoot (portrayed by Rufe Davis) while also developing a romantic interest in Eunice Douglas. Betty Jo Bradley appears in one episode as Eb Dawson's date. Her sister Bobbie Jo appears in the same episode. Blonde-haired Billie Jo is the only Bradley sister never to appear in Green Acres. Western film actor Smiley Burnette guest-stars several times as railway engineer Charley Pratt in 1965 and 1966. Burnette and Pat Buttram (Mr. Haney) were both comic sidekicks of singing cowboy Gene Autry in his 1950s Westerns.

=== Crossovers with The Beverly Hillbillies ===
In the March 1967, episode "The Beverly Hillbillies" (season 2, episode 23), the Hooterville theater puts on a play in homage to "famous television show" The Beverly Hillbillies. Oliver plays Jethro opposite Lisa as Granny Clampett.

Starting in 1968, The Beverly Hillbillies aired episodes with the Clampetts in Hooterville visiting distant cousins the Bradley family. This brought the world of all three shows into the same reality. "The Thanksgiving Story" includes a split-second insert of Eddie Albert and Eva Gabor at the dinner table with the casts of all three series. There is a subplot with Eb Dawson falling in love with Elly May Clampett that continues in the following episode, "The Courtship of Homer Noodleman". The Clampetts return to the Shady Rest Hotel in "Christmas in Hooterville" with Eb still fawning over a reluctant Elly May.

== Cast ==
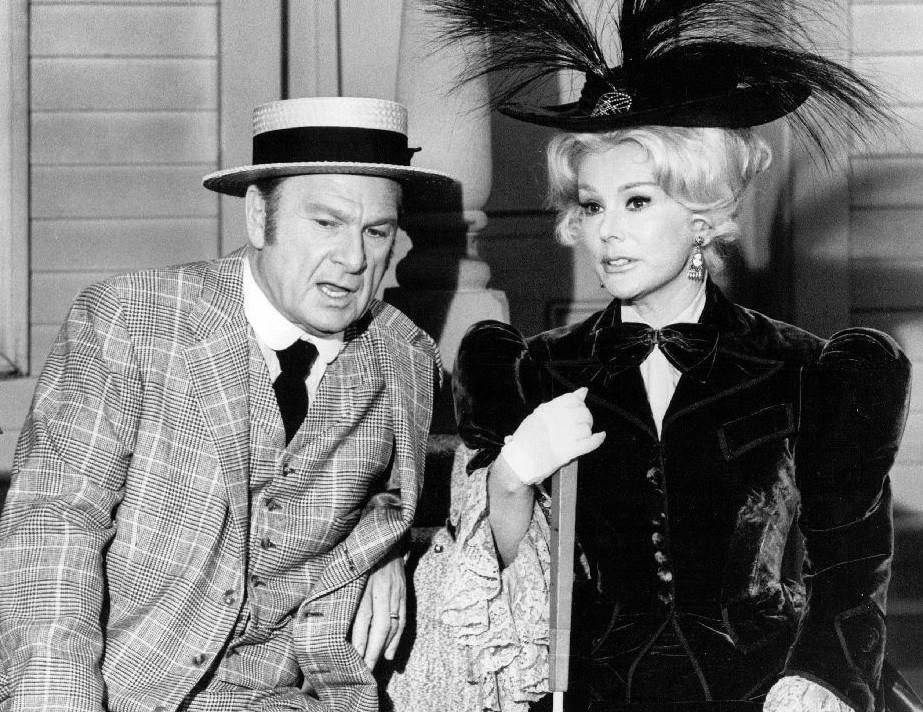
Eddie Albert and Eva Gabor in episode "The Old Trunk" (1969)

- Oliver Wendell Douglas: Eddie Albert (170 episodes)
- Lisa Douglas: Eva Gabor (170 episodes)
- Eb Dawson: Tom Lester (148 episodes)
- Sam Drucker: Frank Cady (142 episodes)
- Eustace Haney: Pat Buttram (143 episodes)
- Hank Kimball (Henry Wadsworth Kimball): Alvy Moore (79 episodes)
- Fred Ziffel: Hank Patterson (50 episodes)
- Doris Ziffel: Barbara Pepper (1965–1968) (30 episodes)/Fran Ryan (1969–71) (7 episodes, 5 as Doris Ziffel)
- Arnold Ziffel: (Original pig came from the town of Union Star, Missouri)
- Ralph Monroe (Ralph Waldo Monroe): Mary Grace Canfield (41 episodes)
- Alf Monroe: Sid Melton (1965–1969) (26 episodes)
- Newt Kiley: Kay E. Kuter (1965–1970) (24 episodes)
- Mother Eunice Douglas: Eleanor Audley (1965–1969) (15 episodes)
- Roy Trendell: Robert Foulk (1966–1968) (15 episodes)
- Ben Miller: Tom Fadden (1965)
- Horace Colby: Hal Smith

In addition, the crossovers from Petticoat Junction cast members, most frequently, were:

- Uncle Joe Carson: Edgar Buchanan (1965–1969) (17 episodes)
- Floyd Smoot: Rufe Davis (1965–1967) (10 episodes)
- Charley Pratt: Smiley Burnette (1965–1967) (7 episodes)
- Kate Bradley: Bea Benaderet (1965–1966) (6 episodes)

=== Guest stars ===
During its six-season run, many familiar actors guest-starred on the show, along with other lesser-known performers who later achieved stardom, among them John Daly, Elaine Joyce, Gary Dubin, Herbert Anderson, June Foray, Bob Cummings, Sam Edwards, Jerry Van Dyke, J. Pat O'Malley, Johnny Whitaker, Jesse White, Al Lewis, Gordon Jump, Bernie Kopell, Len Lesser, Bob Hastings, Don Keefer, Don Porter, Alan Hale Jr., Melody Patterson, Rusty Hamer, Regis Toomey, Heather North, Allan Melvin, Parley Baer, Jack Bannon, Reginald Gardiner, Rick Lenz, Al Molinaro, Pat Morita, and Rich Little in a cameo as himself.

== Cancellation ==
In 1970–1971, during the series' sixth season, Green Acres placed 34th out of 96 shows. Despite the respectable ratings and winning its timeslot, the network cancelled the show in the spring of 1971 after 170 episodes.

CBS at the time was under mounting pressure from sponsors to have more urban-themed programs on its schedule. To make room for the newer shows, nearly all of the rural-themed shows were cancelled, later known as the "rural purge," of which Pat Buttram said, "CBS cancelled everything with a tree – including Lassie."

As a result of the sudden cancellation, there was no series finale. The final two episodes of Green Acres were backdoor pilots for two shows that were never picked up by a network. In the penultimate episode of season 6 ("Hawaiian Honeymoon"), Oliver and Lisa take a trip to Hawaii. Most of the episode focuses on hotel owner Bob Carter (Don Porter) and his daughter Pam (Pamela Franklin), thus the proposed title for the new series was simply Pam. The final episode of season six (and ultimately the Green Acres series) heavily featured Oliver's former secretary in Manhattan, Carol Rush (Elaine Joyce), with proposed spinoff titles said to be Carol or The Blonde.

== Episodes ==
Season	Episodes	Originally released	
Season	Episodes	First released	Last released
1	32	September 15, 1965	June 1, 1966
2	30	September 14, 1966	April 26, 1967
3	30	September 6, 1967	April 10, 1968
4	26	September 25, 1968	April 2, 1969
5	26	September 27, 1969	April 11, 1970
6	26	September 15, 1970	April 27, 1971

== Revivals ==
The surviving members of the cast (except for Eleanor Audley, who had retired from acting 20 years earlier) were reunited for a TV movie titled Return to Green Acres. It aired on CBS on May 18, 1990. Eddie Albert and Eva Gabor also recreated their Green Acres characters for the 1993 CBS special The Legend of the Beverly Hillbillies.

On November 19, 2007, original series director Richard L. Bare announced that he was working on a revival of Green Acres.

Variety announced on July 22, 2012, that a Broadway-aimed musical was in development, with an initial draft of the book written by Bare. No composer, lyricist, or director was attached. Bare died in 2015.

== Home media ==
MGM Home Entertainment released the first three seasons of Green Acres on Region 1 DVD. The entire six-season run of the series is available for purchase via Amazon's video-on-demand service.

On July 7, 2017, Shout! Factory announced it had acquired the rights to release future seasons of the show. It subsequently released Green Acres – The Complete Series on DVD in Region 1 on October 17, 2017.

Shout! Factory released season 4 on November 28, 2017. They released season 5 on February 27, 2018, followed by season 6 on July 10, 2018. A DVD & Blu-ray released on Studio Distribution Services its 35th anniversary.

DVD name	Episodes	Region 1	Region 2	Region 4
The Complete First Season	32	January 13, 2004	January 15, 2007	N/A
The Complete Second Season	30	March 8, 2005	N/A	N/A
The Complete Third Season	30	December 6, 2005	N/A	N/A
The Complete Fourth Season	26	November 28, 2017	N/A	N/A
The Complete Fifth Season	26	February 27, 2018	N/A	N/A
The Complete Sixth Season	26	July 10, 2018	N/A	N/A
The Complete Series	170	October 17, 2017	N/A	N/A

== Nielsen ratings ==
Season	Time	Rank	Rating
1) 1965–66	Wednesday at 9:00–9:30 PM	#11	24.6
2) 1966–67	Wednesday at 9:00–9:30 PM	#6	24.6
3) 1967–68	Wednesday at 9:00–9:30 PM	#15	22.8 (tied with the CBS Friday Night Movie)
4) 1968–69	Wednesday at 9:30–10:00 PM	#19	21.6
5) 1969–70	Saturday at 9:00–9:30 PM	#36	19.2
6) 1970–71	Tuesday at 8:00–8:30 PM	Not in the Top 30	—N/a

== Reunion film ==
In the 1990 reunion TV movie Return to Green Acres, made and set two decades after the series, Oliver and Lisa have moved back to New York but are miserable there. The Hootervillians implore the couple to return and save the town from a scheme to destroy it, cooked up between Mr. Haney and a wealthy, underhanded developer (Henry Gibson). The Monroe brothers still have not finished the Douglases' bedroom, while a 20-something Arnold survived his "parents" and subsequently bunks with his "cousin", the Ziffels' comely niece. With a nod to the times, Haney's latest product is a Russian miracle fertilizer called "Gorby Grow". The film was distributed by Orion Television Entertainment, the successor to Filmways.

== Film and Broadway adaptation ==
In January 1997, it was announced a film adaptation of Green Acres was in development at Fox Family Films with a script by E. Jack Kaplan and Richard Chapman and Bette Midler in the role of Lisa Douglas. By December of that year, Midler had dropped out of the project with Ben Stiller joining the project through his company Red Hour Productions to star and possibly direct with an intent on taking a more irreverent direction with the material. In October 1998, it was reported that Robert Cohen was writing a new draft of the script. Until his death in March 2015, Bare was working on a film version of the TV series, and he teamed with Phillip Goldfine and his Hollywood Media Bridge to produce it. A Broadway version was also in development.

== Recognition ==
In 1984, the USC School of Cinematic Arts gave a retrospective of Green Acres to honor Sommers.

== See also ==
- Good Neighbors (TV series)
- Bless This Mess (TV series)
- Guestward, Ho!
- The Egg and I (book)
- The Egg and I (film)

== Bibliography ==
- Cox, Stephen (March 15, 1993). The Hooterville Handbook: A Viewer's Guide to Green Acres. St. Martin's Griffin. ISBN 978-0-3120-8811-8.
