= Lisa Douglas =

1960s CBS TV sitcom character

- Green Acres character
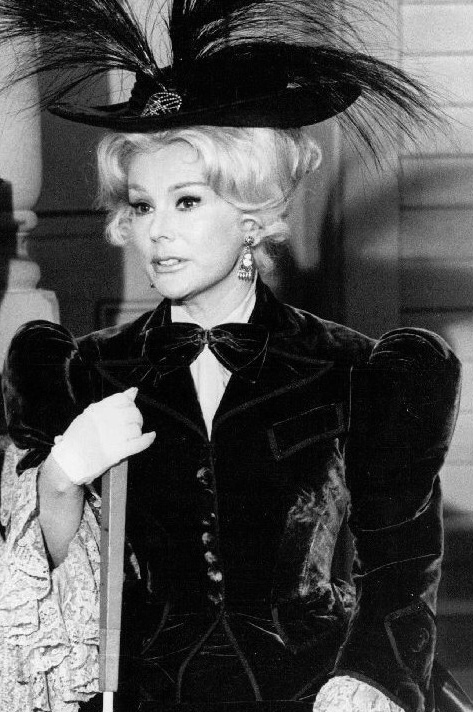
- Created by: Paul Henning
- Portrayed by: Eva Gabor

In-universe information
- Occupation: Housewife
- Spouse: Oliver Wendell Douglas

Lisa Douglas (née Gronyitz) was the leading female character in the 1960s CBS situation comedy Green Acres, which ran for six years, from 1965 to 1971. The character was reprised in the 1990 film Return to Green Acres. CNN rated the character as being amongst "The most stylish TV housewives of all time".

== Character background ==
Lisa (portrayed by actress Eva Gabor), a glamorous Hungarian immigrant, plays the role of the wife of Oliver Wendell Douglas, a successful New York City attorney who had long harbored the dream of moving to the Midwest and operating a farm. The leitmotif of the character through the years remains her comedic Hungarian accent and naivety, which leads to numerous jocular interactions with the Hooterville locals, who mishear Lisa's statements and are likewise misheard by Lisa. Both Lisa and Oliver are regularly portrayed as wearing city clothes, which seem misfit in the Hooterville expanse. Lisa's penchant for wearing resplendent jewelry, costly dresses and heeled footwear adds to this characterization through the seasons.

== Timeline ==
In the initial episodes, Lisa plays a Manhattan socialite who has no desire to leave the luxuries of her lifestyle in New York, but is forced to do so and move to rural Hooterville, when her husband, whom she loves considerably, decides to undertake farming. After shifting to Hooterville, she becomes close to many farm animals, especially to the neighboring family's pet piglet Arnold, and takes up various cooking activities. Yet, despite her attempts, Lisa is unable to fit into the Hooterville culture, wishing relentlessly to go back, while her husband sticks resolutely to his philanthropic values of remaining embedded to the rural heartland.

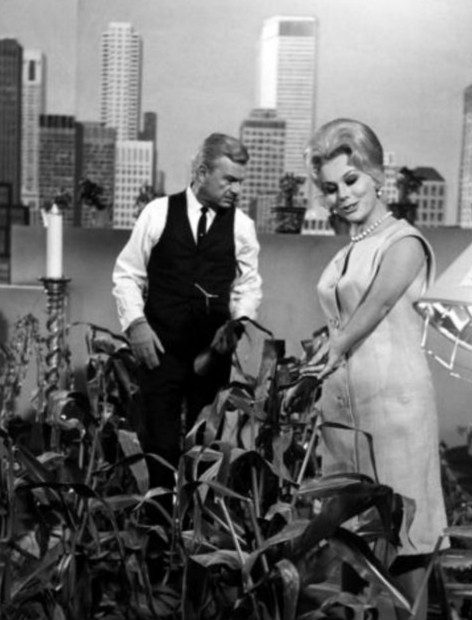
Eva Gabor's portrayal of Lisa Douglas, featured above in the 1965 show-premiere publicity image, garnered broad critical acclaim

As the episodes progress, it is Lisa who becomes comfortably enmeshed with the Hooterville life, undertaking various entrepreneurial and philanthropic activities, while Oliver faces numerous challenges, both in his entrepreneurial work and philanthropic orientation. The final episodes impress the significance of Lisa's rise to prominence in the Hooterville community and the apparent lack of importance that Hooterville residents accord to her husband. The concluding episode of the series, titled Lisa the Psychologist, reemphasizes this portrayal, showcasing Lisa as a psychoanalyst whose services are much sought after by one and all.

The character of Lisa Douglas is reprised in the 1990 film Return to Green Acres, which shows Lisa and Oliver, after a spate of disappointments, shifting to New York. However, subsequent to Hooterville residents reaching out to Lisa and Oliver for support to save their homes from being usurped by a local developer, both Lisa and Oliver realize their significant emotional attachment to Hooterville; and finally decide to move back.

== Critical review ==
The character of Lisa Douglas engendered broad critical acclaim. While CNN rated the character as being amongst "The most stylish TV housewives of all time", Lisa's character has also been critiqued as exemplifying an American housewife of those times who goes as per her husband's views. (Note: Whitt (1996): "The dislocation the Douglases experience makes the viewer identify with Oliver and [...] his "faith in a rational order.") (Note: Delbert (2014): "The theme song also explains that Lisa has no input in the decision, as Oliver sings, “You are my wife,” and Lisa responds, “Goodbye, city life!”...") At the same time, Lisa's character has been reviewed broadly as being amongst select "familiar and congenial" television characters, those which offered the American audiences an "escape and a sense that order might yet prevail."

Larry Karaszewski writes in the USC Spectator: "While Mr. Douglas thinks he is a 'real farmer', Mrs. Douglas has no such pretensions. She simply is what she is and the citizens of Hooterville accept her for being herself [...] Much of Green Acres is about a communications gap and Lisa is central to the gap."

In the book Politics and the American Television Comedy, pop culture author Doyle Greene writes: "Oliver and Lisa were [...] transformed into cultural and political caricatures, even dialectical oppositions: husband versus wife; rural life versus urbanity; Protestant work ethic versus flights of fancy; and, above all, America versus Europe. As the embodiment of Europe in all of its aristocratic glory, Lisa represents the very culture that America explicitly saw itself as being reborn from in the frontiers of the New World."
