= Jay Sommers =

American television producer

- Born: January 3, 1917; Troy, New York, U.S.
- Died: September 25, 1985 (aged 68); Los Angeles, California, U.S.

Jay Sommers (January 3, 1917 – September 25, 1985) was an American producer, director and comedy writer whose career spanned four decades. He wrote more than 90 television comedy episodes, produced 63, and was creator and producer of the Green Acres television show. He also wrote for and executive produced Petticoat Junction during its second and third seasons, and also worked for The Adventures of Ozzie and Harriet.

== Early years ==
Sommers studied chemistry at City College of New York before becoming a comedy writer.

== Career ==
In 1940, he got a break by being brought in to write for a Milton Berle radio show. (Berle at the time was one of the most popular radio personalities.) He wrote for The Alan Young Show, Eddie Cantor, Spike Jones, and Red Skelton on the radio, and for the radio comedy series Lum and Abner.

In 1950, he was the producer, writer and director for the Granby's Green Acres radio show. Although it only ran for two months, it later served as the basis for the highly successful Green Acres television show that he created 15 years later, on which he served as main producer and writer.

His first television work was in 1955, as a writer for The Great Gildersleeve. He wrote three episodes of Hello, Larry toward the end of his life. He is credited for the story and screenplay for the movie Gordy, released 10 years after his death.

== Pilot ==
Sommers produced, created and co-wrote Pioneer Spirit, a pilot that was broadcast on NBC television July 21, 1969.

== Recognition ==
In 1984, the USC School of Cinematic Arts honored Sommers by giving a retrospective of Green Acres.

== Death ==
Sommers died of a heart disease September 25, 1985, at Cedars-Sinai Medical Center in Los Angeles, California. He was survived by his wife, five sons and a grandson.
