= Oliver Wendell Douglas =

- Green Acres character
- Created by: Paul Henning
- Portrayed by: Eddie Albert

In-universe information
- Occupation: Attorney
- Spouse: Lisa Douglas

Oliver Wendell Douglas is the main character in the 1960s CBS sitcom, Green Acres. Portrayed by Hollywood veteran Eddie Albert, Oliver Wendell Douglas is a New York City attorney who acts out his long-harbored dream of moving to the Midwest where he trades in his job of practicing "big city" law to operate a country farm. In addition to appearing on Green Acres, the character also makes several cross-over appearances on the in-universe show, Petticoat Junction.

== Character biography ==
Oliver Wendell Douglas is a New York City attorney who had long harbored a dream of moving to the Midwest and operating a farm rather than practicing "big city" law. His wife, Lisa, a glamorous Hungarian immigrant (played by Eva Gabor), has no desire to leave sophisticated New York City for a rural area. His mother, Eunice (Eleanor Audley), sides with Lisa against the couple leaving New York City for the country.

However, once they arrive at their newly purchased farm (which features a run-down, dilapidated farmhouse), it is not Oliver, but Lisa, who immediately fits into Hooterville and its collection of zany characters. Oliver is usually presented as the only sane character in an insane world. Oliver doesn't fit into a place where everyone takes for granted that a "talking" pig, Arnold Ziffel, is his owners' "son"; where one of the two housing contractor "brothers" is a woman; where the farmhand he hires, young Eb Dawson, refers to him and Lisa as his "parents"; and where local confidence man Mr. Haney, from whom he bought the farm, is always getting the upper hand. Of course, Oliver has quirks as well, such as driving his tractor wearing the same three-piece suits that he had formerly worn to practice law. He also addresses nearly everyone in Hooterville as Mr. or Mrs., even though the residents use a first-name basis with each other (although they reciprocate by referring to Oliver as "Mr. Douglas").

Oliver has a high opinion of farmers, and often makes speeches in which he refers to "crops shooting up out of the ground" (Lisa, in her Hungarian accent, repeats the sentiment as "crops shoosting out of the ground"). During these speeches on the idealistic nature of rural life, patriotic music (Yankee Doodle to be exact) often plays; other characters frequently search for the source of the music. Oliver is so enamored of farming that, in the pilot episode, during a flashback while on a bombing mission in a P-38, Oliver annoys his squadron commander with comments about how tomatoes are made into ketchup. An episode in which the Hooterville townsfolk try to convince Oliver to fly a broken down Curtiss JN-4 from World War I, reveals that Oliver was a captain in USAF Reserves.

Despite Oliver's love of farming, he is totally incompetent as a farmer. His denial leads him to labor on in vain, year after year, when it is obvious to everyone else that he would be far more successful back in his New York law practice. Although he is a horrible farmer and once made only $16 of profit for the entire year, the Douglases never seem to worry about money. For example, they never have trouble replacing the numerous dishes that Lisa would break. In one episode this causes the other residents to believe that Oliver is making and selling alcohol, and that he is involved with the mob.

The show features numerous running gags, such as Oliver "losing" in one way or another to the Hooterville yokels. In one episode Mr. Haney, Lisa, and Hank Kimball think they've discovered a "Milk-making" Machine. Oliver must tell them (tongue-in-cheek) that not only are the chemicals so expensive that milk prices would soar, but that one of the ingredients in this new milk also causes temporary baldness. Another episode shows Oliver as a "successful" lawyer when he manages to convince the US Army not to draft Arnold Ziffel, the Pig, into the Army. Another running gag in later seasons of the show involves Oliver frequently unable to finish a sentence, due to being interrupted by other characters.

== Character creation ==
In the 1950 radio sitcom on which Green Acres was originally based, the character was a banker named John Granby and portrayed by Gale Gordon. Granby, in turn, was based on Gordon's character on My Favorite Husband. In a notable difference between the radio and television versions, Granby had a teenage daughter, which the Douglases did not. The character's basic premise of a white-collar city man with a passion for farming but no talent for it remained unchanged.

The character's name was inspired by famed Supreme Court justice Oliver Wendell Holmes and possibly also by then-Supreme Court justice William Orville Douglas.

== See also ==
- Hooterville
