= List of The Joey Bishop Show episodes =

This is a list of episodes for the television sitcom The Joey Bishop Show, which was broadcast on NBC for three seasons and then moved to CBS for its fourth and final season.

== Series overview ==
Season	Episodes	Originally released		
Season	Episodes	First released	Last released	Network
1	32	September 20, 1961	May 9, 1962	NBC
2	34	September 15, 1962	May 11, 1963	NBC
3	31	September 14, 1963	April 25, 1964	NBC
4	26	September 29, 1964	March 30, 1965	CBS

=== Season 1 (1961–62) ===
Most of season 1 episodes were broadcast in black-and-white.

No. overall	No. in season	Title	Directed by	Written by	Original release date
1	1	"On the Spot"	David Lowell Rich	Story by : Marvin Marx; Teleplay by : Ray Singer & Dick Chevillat	September 20, 1961
Joey gets fired from his public relations job. He tells his brother-in-law Frank (Joe Flynn) what happened. Joey then badmouths his boss, Mr. Willoughby, on a hidden camera TV show while at a local diner. Joey finds out about being filmed and regrets what he said. Frank talks him into signing the release anyway. Later in the day Joey learns his boss is giving him his job back as Willoughby gave him wrong instructions to begin with. Joey must now prevent his boss from seeing the show. Joey and Frank pretend to be TV repairmen and try to get Willoughby's TV out of his office. Mr. Willoughby catches them. That evening, Joey thinks he's in the clear when the TV show is pre-empted. Then Frank tells him he spoke with Willoughby. Despite that, Joey still has his job. Joey Forman as Charlie Hogan, the counter man at the diner who is part of the TV show. Madge Blake as Mrs. Barnes. Nancy Hadley as Barbara Simpson, Willoughby's secretary. Note: First episode for the characters of Joey, Frank, Mrs. Barnes, Barbara and Mr. Willoughby.
2	2	"Joey Meets Jack Paar"	David Lowell Rich	Ray Singer, Dick Chevillat	September 27, 1961
Joey expects to be doing publicity work for Marilyn Monroe, but instead, it's a chimp named Cindy that worked in a new film, "African Safari". Joey meets Cindy's trainer, Lorraine Rogers. Mr. Willoughby wants Joey to get Cindy on "The Tonight Show" with Jack Paar. At Jack's office, Joey must compete against auditioning singers, Jack's daughter and constant phone calls for Jack's attention. Joey finally manages to get Cindy on the show. When he tells Lorraine about the big break, she goes out to have her hair done and leaves Joey with Cindy. When Lorraine is not back by showtime, Joey, by now petrified with stage fright, must go on with Cindy himself. Things do not go well for Joey. Warren Berlinger as Larry Barnes. Marlo Thomas as Stella Barnes. Jerry Hausner as Agent. Shirley Mitchell as Secretary. Patrick Waltz as Stage Manager. Note: First episode for the characters of Larry and Stella.
3	3	"A Windfall for Mom"	David Lowell Rich	Frank Gill, Jr. & G. Carleton Brown	October 4, 1961
Joey wants to talk to his Mother about unpaid bills and her own mismanagement of money. Stella wants to go to Mr. Stowalski (Leonid Kinskey), a voice coach, so she can audition for a part in a TV show. Joey doesn't have the money for it. Mother wants to get a job, but Joey says no. Barbara tells Joey he is to interview Dora Dunphy (Barbara Stanwyck), a domestic problem expert. Joey learns that his mother took a job at a supermarket. Dora tells Joey to set up a pretend trust fund from a long lost relative for his mother so she feels she can contribute to the household. But now Mother hires Mr. Stowalski for Stella and makes several other purchases. Larry tells Joey to pretend he lost his job and Mother will have to start budgeting. When Frank comes up with a get rich quick scheme with Mothers money, Joey confesses what he did. Renee Godfrey as First Woman. Vera Marshe as Second Woman. Note: This episode was filmed in color.
4	4	"This Is Your Life"	David Lowell Rich	Story by : Marvin Marx; Teleplay by : Fred S. Fox & Iz Elinson	October 11, 1961
Willoughby assigns Joey the task of getting Danny Williams (Danny Thomas) to L.A. for an appearance on "This Is Your Life" - without Danny knowing about it. Meanwhile, Danny is supposed to take his wife Kathy (Marjorie Lord) out for the evening. He gets a call saying he has to go to rehearsal. Kathy is furious as he has broken so many dinner dates lately. Joey gets together with Kathy to try and figure a way to get Danny to California. Joey gives her the plane tickets and they agree to meet again. As they leave the restaurant, Danny and his boss Charlie Halper (Sid Melton) see them. After talking to Kathy and not getting a real answer, Danny starts to become suspicious. He then finds the plane tickets. Joey and Kathy tell Charlie what's going on. Charlie believes Danny will follow the two of them to California because he is so jealous and wants to kill Joey. In the end, Danny gets to the show without knowing about it and everything works out.
5	5	"The Contest Winner"	David Lowell Rich	Story by : Harry Crane, Stan Dreben & Marvin Marx; Teleplay by : Harry Crane & Stan Dreben	October 18, 1961
Mother tells Joey that Frank has quit his job. Frank and Betty (Virginia Vincent) come over for dinner. Frank wants to borrow some money from Joey to buy a boat. He also mentions entering a slogan contest he saw in the paper. Joey brings Frank to see Mr. Collyer (Les Damon) about a job and Joey makes Frank take it. Betty lets the family know that Frank won $10,000 from a slogan contest for a biscuit company. But the pretzel company where Joey just got him a job is an affiliate, making Frank ineligible for the prize money. Frank comes up with a plan to where Joey claims he wrote to slogan and Frank stole it. They'll give Joey the money and he later will give it to Frank. Mr. Chadwick (Addison Richards) from the biscuit company arrives. Frank's plan backfires when it's learned that Willoughby's company is also affiliated with the biscuit company, making Joey ineligible. Note: First episode for the character of Betty.
6	6	"The Bachelor"	David Lowell Rich	Harry Crane, Stan Dreben	October 25, 1961
Joey and his client, Connie Bowers (Sue Ane Langdon), are caught in the rain. Both are soaking wet, so he takes her home. She discovers that Joey lives with his mother, brother, and sister. Connie asks Joey how he handles being a bachelor and living with his family. The next day, Willoughby tells Joey that Brian Taylor (Dennis O'Keefe) is leaving to play a theater engagement out east. Joey is to make sure that Brian leaves without a hitch. Brian is quite the swinging single with a beautiful apartment. Brian tells Joey that he needs to get his own place. With his mother's insistence, Joey pet-sits Brian's dog in his apartment. Joey invites Connie over to the apartment. As Joey is trying to make a pass at Connie, she tells him that she and her boyfriend have made up and are going to get married. Susan Hart as Marilyn.
7	7	"Five Brides For Joey"	David Lowell Rich	Si Rose, Seaman Jacobs	November 1, 1961
Frank and Betty split up over a minor disagreement about where to vacation. Counseling the couple, Joey mentions how he wishes he was married. Frank and Betty reconcile. Each member of the family sets out to find Joey a prospective bride. Meanwhile at the office, Barbara tells Marge (Jean Carson) that she was hoping Joey would ask her out, but he doesn't know she's alive. Barbara has been in love with Joey for 3 years. Mother Barnes has Annabelle Johnson (Bek Nelson) come over to meet Joey. Soon after, Stella comes in with Peggy Irwin. Larry then walks in with June Rogers. Frank and Betty come in with Helen Dimsdale. The next day Joey tells Barbara about the awkward evening. She tells Joey there's nothing wrong with having a steady girl. Joey comes up with the plan to have Barbara pretend to be his steady and then the family would leave him alone. Upset about being used like that, Barbara has a way to teach Joey a lesson. Note: This episode was filmed in color.
8	8	"Back in Your Own Backyard"	David Lowell Rich	Story by : Harry Crane, Stan Dreben & Marvin Marx; Teleplay by : Harry Crane & Stan Dreben	November 8, 1961
Mother Barnes tells Joey that Frank has a new job as a salesman and he has sold them a swimming pool. Joey tells Frank he is not buying a pool. While testing the soil in the Barnes' backyard, Frank strikes oil. But Joey realizes the hole they dug is actually on the adjacent lot. Frank finds out that the lot is for sale for $10,000. Frank and Joey get Mr. Willoughby to invest in their get rich quick scheme and buy the land. Surveyor Mr. Connors comes to Joey's house. He tells Frank and Joey that they punctured an abandoned oil storage tank. Joey doesn't know how to tell Willoughby the news. Mr. Kissinger (Peter Leeds) comes by and tells Joey he's interested in buying the lot. There are plans to build a movie theater and Kissinger will pay $15,000 for the lot. Frank turns down the deal. With some more money, Frank says they could turn the lot into a parking lot. Willoughby goes along with the idea. They build the parking lot. Then they find out from Kissinger that he's putting in a drive-in movie theater.
9	9	"Charity Begins at Home"	David Lowell Rich	Si Rose & Seaman Jacobs	November 15, 1961
Mrs. Barnes has taken in a boarder, Mr. Cooper (Howard McNear), without Joey knowing. Joey wants him out. What the family doesn't know is that he's running a bookie joint out of his room. Joey wants a raise and Barbara gives him some advice. She tells Joey to flatter Willoughby and invite him over for dinner. Sgt. Thompson (Milton Frome) knows there's a gambling operation running out of Joey's house. Mrs. Barnes innocently and unknowingly involves herself with the gambling operation. The Willoughbys are at Joey's house and Mr. Willoughby is singing for everyone. Suddenly, Mr. Cooper and his partner Mr. Corey run out of the house. While answering Mr. Cooper's phone in his room, Larry finds out that the house is about to be raided. Sgt. Thompson and the police arrive and arrest everyone. While in a line-up, the Lieutenant (Patrick Waltz) tells Mother Barnes to confess to being the ringleader. Even though Mr. Cooper is finally caught, Willoughby has fired Joey. Mrs. Willoughby (Eleanor Audley) forces her husband to give Joey his job back with a raise. She tells everyone it was the most fun she's had in years. Johnny Silver as Mug in Lineup.
10	10	"Ring-A-Ding-Ding"	David Lowell Rich	Harry Crane & Stan Dreben	November 22, 1961
Joey has to put up with egotistical movie star Ricky Hamilton (Henry Silva) who thinks he is a great lover. Joey makes a bet that Ricky can't get Barbara to go out with him. Barbara initially turns Ricky down because she is interested in Joey. Her friend Marge convinces her to use the opportunity to make Joey jealous. Joey sees Ricky and Barbara together and is not happy. The next day, Joey tells her that Ricky is not to be trusted, but Barbara has another date set with Ricky. Barbara has a third date with Ricky. Joey knows that Ricky always makes his move on a third date. Joey shows up at the restaurant where Barbara and Ricky are and keeps bothering them. Something Joey intentionally says, causes two husbands to beat Ricky up. Joey then leaves with Barbara. Mickey Simpson as Charley. Angela Greene as Bessie. Baynes Barron as Bruce. Evelyn Scott as Bruce's Wife.
11	11	"Help Wanted"	David Lowell Rich	Barry E. Blitzer	November 29, 1961
Joey's brother-in-law Frank is unemployed again. With a lot of pressure from the family, Joey asks Mr. Willoughby to give Frank a job. Willoughby at first doesn't want to hire Frank. Willoughby wants Joey to pick up new client comedian Buddy Morgan (Mickey Manners) from the airport and give him the red carpet treatment. Joey reminds Willoughby that he has another assignment that night and there is no one else available. Willoughby then suggests that Frank does it. Frank, ever the know-it-all, manages to convince Buddy that he should give up comedy and turn to Shakespeare. Willoughby is furious and wants Joey to get rid of Frank. When Joey gets home, the family is celebrating Franks new job. Joey doesn't have the heart to tell Frank he's fired. Larry suggests that Willoughby let Frank finish out the week figuring that he'll quit by then. Willoughby reluctantly agrees. Willoughby talks Buddy into staying with comedy. When Joey learns that Frank was going to speak with Buddy, he goes to Buddy and tells him not to listen to anything Frank says. Things get embarrassing when Joey finds out Frank was never there, but Willoughby is still there. Note: Last episode for the characters of Frank, Betty and Barbara.
12	12	"The Ham in the Family"	David Lowell Rich	Iz Elinson & Fred S. Fox	December 6, 1961
After a hit performance in his college follies, Larry decides to quit med school in favor of a show business career. Joey and Mother try to talk Larry out of it, but he is determined. Stella agrees with Larry. Joey takes Larry to talent agent Marty Milford (Herbie Faye) in hopes that he will say Larry has no talent. Much to Joey's disappointment, Marty tells Larry he does have talent and he'll be his agent. Joey asks his friend Blinky Wilson (Jack Albertson) to give Larry a spot in his show. Joey hopes Larry will bomb and go back to school. Right before Larry is to go on, Joey gives him a scary version of a pep talk. When he's called, Larry freezes up. But now Joey has to fill in for him. Note: This episode was filmed in color.
13	13	"Follow That Mink"	Frederick de Cordova	Frank Gill, Jr. & G. Carleton Brown	December 13, 1961
Mother Barnes' birthday is coming up. Tomorrow is Willoughby's 25th wedding anniversary and he'll be out of town. Willoughby decides to have Joey present his wife with a mink stole and Willoughby will call her at the same time. Willoughby will have the mink sent to Joey's house. Unfortunately, Mother intercepts the package and thinks it's her birthday present. Neighbor Mrs. Tonetti (Argentina Brunetti) comes by with a cake. Mother shows off her mink. The next day, Joey tells Larry about the mix-up. Joey tells Mother to put the mink back in the box until it is insured. Mother wants to give her old fur choker to the ladies aid bazaar. She puts the choker in the mink box. Larry and Joey come up with a plan to make it look as though a burglar stole the mink. Things get complicated, but Joey finally gets the box out of the house. Larry finds out that the mink is still in the house. Joey and the box are with Mrs. Willoughby when Larry calls to tell Joey about the mink. Willoughby surprises everyone when he shows up. Mrs. Willoughby opens the box and finds the old choker. Note: This is the last appearance of the Mr. Willoughby character.
14	14	"Barney, the Bloodhound"	Frederick de Cordova	Elon Packard & Stanley Davis	December 27, 1961
Joey has signed a contract with Mr. Collins (Raymond Bailey), the head of Presto dog food company. Mr. Collins has the right to use Joey's likeness in the promotion of their product. Joey's upset to find that he is now the face of logo "Barney the Bloodhound". Local children are teasing Joey about it. Joey learns that the commercial success of Barney commits him to make personal appearances in a dog costume. Even Joey's family is being embarrassed by the situation. Mr. Collins brings by Harlow (Jonathan Hole), the designer, to fit Joey for his doggy suit. Joey refuses and Collins says he'll sue for breach of contract. Larry recommends his friend Harvey Wallace (Jack Mullaney) for Joey's lawyer, but it doesn't work out. In court, Joey now has Mr. Bundy (Walter Reed) as his lawyer. Both parties present their case. Joey wins the case when Judge Brandon (Charles Meredith) sees Joey dressed as Barney the Bloodhound. Addison Richards as Edgar Spaulding, the prosecuting lawyer.
15	15	"Taming of the Brat"	James V. Kern	Si Rose & Seaman Jacobs	January 3, 1962
Joey is assigned to look after demanding and spoiled child star Ronnie Richards (Flip Mark). As part of a promotion for his next film, Ronnie is to hide at Joey's house for a couple days. Joey's family is less than thrilled. Late that night, Ronnie blasts the late show on TV, plays drums and wakes the family up. Mother Barnes says Ronnie needs a good spanking. After a disagreement, Ronnie threatens to leave, but the family calls his bluff. Ronnie, however, sneaks out of the house. Joey talks to the Police Sergeant (Richard Reeves) to report Ronnie missing. Believing this is nothing more than a publicity stunt, the Sergeant tells Joey to leave. After a call from Ronnie, Joey tracks him down to a hotel and tries to get him to come home. Ronnie has the hotel detective (Larry J. Blake) kick Joey out. Joey finally gets Ronnie home. Something Joey says makes Ronnie rethink his actions. Jerome Cowan as Mr. Grant.
16	16	"Home Sweet Home"	James V. Kern	Harry Crane & Stan Dreben	January 10, 1962
Joey receives a promotion and prepares to move to New York City. He wants the family to go with, but they do not want to leave California. They reluctantly agree to go. Realtor Mr. Crosley comes by to look at the house. Joey changes his mind about the move and is willing to lose his job. A problem arises when Joey learns that his mother has already sold the house. Mr. Crosley refuses to back out of the deal. Mr. Willoughby's nephew, Charles Raymond, is taking over as boss. He really wants to get Joey back. Charles decides to go to Joey's house to talk to him. Meanwhile, the buyer of the house is supposed to come by. Joey has a plan to discourage the man from taking the house. Charles arrives and Joey thinks he's the buyer. Joey does everything he can to make the house look bad. Mr. Crosley comes by and tells Joey the buyer changed his mind. Charles tells Joey who he is and Joey agrees to work for him. Note: This is the first appearance of Bill Bixby as Charles Raymond.
17	17	"A Letter from Stella"	James V. Kern	Fred S. Fox & Iz Elinson	January 17, 1962
Mother Barnes finds a love letter that Stella wrote. It talks about not meeting her family until after they're married. Joey and Larry decide to find out who the man is. Meanwhile, it turns out Stella is writing the letters for her friend Nina Bodanya (Roxane Berard). Nina is in love with Sasha Kolinavitch (Leonid Kinskey), but she doesn't write English very well. Stella and Nina are both taking ballet lessons from Sasha. The family figures out the letters are to Sasha. Joey and Larry go to see him. Joey pays Sasha $1000 to not see Stella anymore. Back at home, Joey finds a phone number that Stella left. He calls and speaks to a Justice of the Peace (Sam Flint) who says that Sasha just got married. Joey goes to the hotel room where Sasha, Nina and Stella are. Stella plays along that she married Sasha. Stella then tells Joey the truth. As he has spent the money, Sasha offers to give Joey $1000 worth of dance lessons.
18	18	"Jury Duty"	James V. Kern	Elon Packard & Stanley Davis	January 24, 1962
Joey gets a letter summoning him to jury duty. However, he does not want to give up his vacation time to do it. So he looks for a way out. Joey goes to a doctor (Jonathan Hole) claiming a nervous condition, but the doctor doesn't buy it. In court, Joey is listening to a case involving a Mr. Rogers and an auto accident. The deliberations are not going fast enough for Joey. He nags his fellow jurors so much that they recess deliberations over the weekend. The jurors reconvene Monday morning. The Judge (Tyler McVey) commends the jury for not rushing to a decision. Joey learns the lesson of "devotion to duty". The jury rules against Mr. Rogers. Joey finally starts his vacation and arrives at his hotel. When there is a problem getting his room because he's 4 days late, the clerk calls the manager. The manager turns out to be Mr. Rogers. William Keene as the jury foreman. Amzie Strickland as Mrs. Vincent. Richard Reeves as Truck Driver Juror. John Gallaudet as Defense Attorney. Gil Perkins as Bailiff.
19	19	"The Income Tax Caper"	James V. Kern	Iz Elinson & Fred S. Fox	January 31, 1962
Mother Barnes is excited about her new furniture. Joey finds an audit notice from the IRS for his 1959 tax return. All of his records are in his old desk. Joey then discovers that Mom gave away his old desk and threw away all of the contents. The family decides to search the attic anyway. Larry's friend Harvey Wallace comes by. While discussing Joey's case, Harvey is not very encouraging. Imagination runs wild in a nightmare, as Joey dreams about the IRS prosecuting him for fraud. When Joey gets to the IRS, it turns out two of his old war time buddies, Sherman (Herbie Faye) and Wilson (Alvy Moore), played a practical joke on him. Joey agrees to a reunion of some of the men at his house. Roy Roberts appears as the Judge in the dream.
20	20	"Double Exposure"	James V. Kern	Harry Crane & Stan Dreben	February 7, 1962
Big Sam sends Benny (Neville Brand) and Charlie (Lee Van Cleef) to change the mind of the comedian Joey Bishop (who looks remarkably like Joey Barnes), whose schedule is too full to open an act for him. Joey Barnes is at the club with his friend Peggy hoping to speak with Bishop after his show. Benny and Charlie are about to strong arm Bishop into leaving with them, when Frank The Policeman (Robert Foulk) shows up at Bishop's dressing room. Bishop leaves with Frank. Joey Barnes goes back stage and is mistakenly kidnapped by Benny and Charlie. The men take Barnes to a house for the time being. Benny shows Barnes all the carrier pigeons he has. Barnes gets a gun away from Benny and then sends a message with one of the pigeons. That plan doesn't work. At Big Sam's club, Barnes is forced to perform. Despite not knowing what he is doing, Barnes is a hit with the audience. Barnes tries to escape, but is caught. Barnes is about to get roughed up, but a surprise on the Jack Paar Show helps him out. Shirley Mitchell as Autograph Seeker. Note: This episode was filmed in color. First episode for Jackie Russell as Peggy.
21	21	"A Man's Best Friend"	James V. Kern	Harry Crane & Stan Dreben	February 14, 1962
Larry finds a huge lost Great Dane dog and brings him home. He hopes Joey will let the family keep it. Joey comes home and thinks the dog it just too big to keep. He wants to put an add in the paper and then house the dog in a kennel. Joey speaks to Pierre (Joey Faye) at the kennel and finds out they are all booked up. Joey talks his boss Charlie Raymond into taking the dog. Larry finds out that there's a $1000 reward for the dog. Joey goes to try and get the dog back from Charlie. Joey finds Charlie and the dog with matching outfits. Larry suggests that Joey trade the dog with another one that looks the same. Joey gets another dog from Pierre and switches it with Charlie's dog. Mr. Rogers (Ollie O'Toole) comes by to pick up the dog and pay the reward. But after a close look, Mr. Rogers tells Joey and Larry that's not the dog he is looking for. A little boy named Tommy Phillips comes by and says the dog belongs to him. Guest appearance by future Beverly Hillbillies costar Nancy Kulp.
22	22	"Very Warm for Christmas"	James V. Kern	Story by : Marvin Marx; Teleplay by : Frank Gill, Jr. & G. Carleton Brown	February 21, 1962
Joey comes home and there are Santa and reindeer lawn decorations in the living room. Mother Barnes tells Joey she bought them at an auction. Despite it being March, Mom wishes the spirit of Christmas could be felt year-round. She has Joey place the decorations in the front yard. The decorations receive quite a bit of attention. Neighbor Jonathan Flint (Willard Waterman) says he will get a petition going to have them removed and take Joey to court. Joey decides to pump Christmas music outside as well. Mom and the rest of the family think Joey should take everything down. Joey is notified that he is to appear in court. After Mother Barnes takes the stand, the Judge (Ellen Corby) rules in Joey's favor. She does however ask Joey to turn down the music. Joe Besser as Leonard Jillson. Fuzzy Knight as the subpoena server. Frank Cady as lawyer Mr. Andrews. Note: First episode for Joe Besser as Leonard Jillson.
23	23	"The Big Date"	James V. Kern	Fred S. Fox & Iz Elinson	February 28, 1962
Joey and Charlie stage a contest for a date with rock singer Snooky Bradford (Nick Adams). They announce that Sally Ames (Jenny Maxwell) of Brooktown, Nevada has won. Mr. Ames (Trevor Bardette), a farmer, says he won't let his daughter go on the date. Joey goes to talk to Mr. Ames. Joey makes up a story that Snooky grew up on a farm and really likes to sing folk songs. Mr. Ames wants to meet Snooky and have him stay on his farm for a couple days. Snooky reluctantly agrees. Farm life starts to get to Snooky, but as a favor to Joey, he sticks with it. When Mr. Ames agrees to let Sally go on the date, Snooky gets ready to leave. Sally tells Joey that Snooky promised to play a local benefit. Snooky performs and the benefit is a success. Mr. Johnson (Doodles Weaver) and some local towns folk tell Snooky how much they appreciate what he did. Snooky tells them he'll come back next year.
24	24	"Joey Hires a Maid"	James V. Kern	Si Rose & Seaman Jacobs	March 7, 1962
With some extra income coming in, Joey surprises his mother and hires a maid. Mother Barnes is not happy about the idea. Joey speaks with Mr. Kendall (Jack Albertson), the maid service director. Joey hires Doreen the maid (Nora Marlowe). The result is not what Joey expected. Doreen can't cook and Joey and his siblings wind up doing all the housework. Doreen just sits around and watches TV. At the Woman's Club, Mother Barnes meets Sarah Collins (Doris Packer). Sarah's children did the same thing to her. She tells Mother Barnes that she secretly takes part-time jobs to keep her busy. Mother Barnes decides to do the same thing. Joey and his girlfriend Peggy go to a dinner party and Joey sees his Mother working there as a maid. Joey realizes his mistake. Jacqueline deWit as Mrs. Shelbourne. Douglas Evans as Mr. Shelbourne. Virginia Carroll as Woman at Party.
25	25	"That's Showbiz"	James V. Kern	Story by : Fred Freeman & Garry Marshall; Teleplay by : Harry Crane & Stan Dreben	March 14, 1962
Charlie hires Kitty Flanders (Jaye P. Morgan) to be Joey's secretary. Kitty tells Joey that she doesn't know the first thing about being a secretary. When Kitty leaves the room, Charlie says he meet her while she was working as a carhop and felt sorry for her. Joey tells Kitty that he can't use her. She asks Joey if he might know of a job for a singer as she sang with a band in Omaha. Feeling guilty, Joey speaks to Barney Lewis at the Pelican Club. Business is not good at the club. Joey makes up a story about Kitty be a French chanteuse. Barney says that Joey owes him a favor and he should talk to Kitty. Joey works with Kitty and tries to get her to sing with an accent. At the club, Kitty sings the song Joey picked for her. Kitty does not go over well with the audience and Barney wants to get her off the stage. Joey tells Kitty to forget the French bit and sing what she does best. Kitty is now a hit with the audience. Note: This episode was filmed in color.
26	26	"A Young Man's Fancy"	James V. Kern	Harry Crane & Stan Dreben	March 21, 1962
Stella's friend Connie (Dawn Wells) is coming to stay for a couple days. What only Stella knows is that Connie's husband Danny is against her drama lessons. This caused a fight and is the reason Connie is coming to the Barnes house. Joey and Larry casually lounge around the house and Stella would like them to make a better impression. Connie shows up and the boys see how beautiful she is. They run off to get dressed better and then compete for Connie's attentions. Joey and Larry each try to one up each other while playing tennis, horseback riding and playing an instrument for Connie. Joey overhears Connie and Larry reading parts of a play. He thinks they are professing their love for each other and will run away that night to get married. Later, Danny calls Connie and apologizes and they each say "I love you". Larry hears this and finds out that Connie is married. Not knowing any of this, Joey tries to talk Larry out of running off to get married. Joey tells him a story about a girl he knew before being shipped out in the Army. It takes some doing, but Joey eventually finds out Connie is married. Bob Hope makes a cameo appearance in a flashback.
27	27	"Surprise, Surprise"	James V. Kern	Iz Elinson & Fred S. Fox	March 28, 1962
Joey asks his mother to cancel plans for his surprise birthday party. After Peggy changes his mind, Joey hints around to Mom that he wishes he had a party. Mom calls Charlie and lets him plan the new party. The day of Joey's birthday, Charlie rents a room at a hotel for the party. Charlie comes up with a plan to get Joey to the hotel and at the right time. Charlie tells Joey to get a signature from a client at the hotel. Because he believes Mom is throwing a party at his house, Joey has Jackson the janitor (Herb Vigran) go to the hotel. Joey goes home and finds an empty house. Mailman Mr. Jillson (Joe Besser) stops by and tries to cheer him up. Meanwhile, Jackson shows up at the hotel and tells everyone Joey went home. Joey figures out that the party must be at the hotel. He goes there, but no one is there. Thinking there really isn't a party, Joey goes home. When he gets home only Mom is there. Then everyone comes out and surprises Joey.
28	28	"Must the Show Go On?"	James V. Kern	Si Rose & Seaman Jacobs	April 11, 1962
Mother Barnes has been put in charge of getting the talent for a show her Women's Club is putting on to raise money. When Joey hears the budget for paying the talent, he suggests an amateur show. Mom wants Joey's help with the auditions. Club President Mrs. Simmons would rather put on a club dinner than the amateur show. She believes the show will be a disaster. Joey learns Mom volunteered him to direct and M.C. the show. Mr. Jillson, Joey's assistant, tells him the running time of the show will be 7 hours. Mrs. Simmons decides to be in the show and wants to sing 7 songs. It's the night of the show and the show is running even longer than predicted. Joey cuts the show short and goes to the finale. The finale isn't even finished and the janitor turns off the lights.
29	29	"Once a Bachelor"	James V. Kern	Harry Crane & Stan Dreben	April 18, 1962
Sally shows her engagement ring from Freddy Fenster (Marty Ingels) to Peggy. Joey decides to throw Freddy a bachelor party. Joey's jokes and gifts about married life at the party go too far, and a scared Freddy calls off the wedding. Joey plans to show Freddy what a happily married couple can be like. He invites Phil and Gracie (Shirley Mitchell) over for dinner and tells them his plan. Freddy shows up. It's only a matter in minutes and Freddy tells Joey to call Sally up and invite her over. But then "The Happy Couple" start fighting and leave. Sally and Peggy show up. Freddy says he's seen what 15 years of marriage is like and he's not interested. Later, Joey tells Peggy he has another plan, jealousy. Joey has Peggy tell Sally to call Freddy and have him come over so she can return the ring. After talking a while, Freddy tells Sally he wants to get married. While Sally is in the other room, Joey comes by and tells Freddy how he's been going out with Sally. When Freddy is about to fight Joey, Sally gets Joey to admit that he made the whole thing up. At the wedding ceremony, Joey can't find the ring. Note: Last episode for Bill Bixby as Charles Raymond.
30	30	"Route 78"	James V. Kern	Harry Crane & Stan Dreben	April 25, 1962
Joey learns from a Surveyor (George O. Petrie) that the city is putting a highway extension through the Barnes' neighborhood. Everyone has to move within 30 days. Mother Barnes organizes a neighborhood protest meeting and everyone agrees to not move. Joey speaks with Mr. Wheelwright (John Gallaudet) from the Division of Highways. He learns that everyone can have their homes moved to new lots as long as they do so within the 30 days. 29 days later and Mom still hasn't not found a lot she likes. Mr. Collier (Chick Chandler) informs the family the wrecking crew will be there at 12:30 the next day. Joey decides to have the house moved that night while Mom is sleeping. The next morning, Joey finds out that Mom knew what was going on all along. Then the family is greeted by many of their neighbors who all moved to the same block. Richard Reeves as Mover.
31	31	"A Show of His Own"	James V. Kern	Fred S. Fox & Iz Elinson	May 2, 1962
Joey receives an offer to host his own network show on a 5 week trial basis. Joey goes to rehearsal and Mr. Jennings (Jonathan Hole), the make-up man, tells him it will take an hour and a half to make him look good. Dave Arnold (Jackie Coogan), the Director, tells Joey that his first guest will be Milton Berle. Joey begins to suffer a lack of confidence. That night Joey has a bad dream about his show. He is extremely nervous and Berle steals the spotlight. After he wakes up, Mom tries to give him a pep talk. It's the night of the show and Milton comes out on stage. Joey expects a lot of jokes and slapstick, but Milton is very restrained. Milton tells Joey that comedy is more sophisticated now. Joey tries some slapstick on Berle, who says it's not funny anymore. Milton does manage to give Joey a pie in the face. Afterwards, Dave Arnold tells Joey that the sponsors loved the show. Milton tells Joey he should finish his show with a catch phrase. Maybe something like "son of a gun". Mickey Manners as Writer. Patrick Waltz as Mr.Tucker.
32	32	"The Image"	James V. Kern	Iz Elinson, Fred S. Fox	May 9, 1962
The network hires public relations man Norman Richards (Peter Leeds) to spruce up Joey's image. Norman wants to change Joey's wardrobe and have him seen around town with a flashy woman. He sets up a date with Barbara Wilson (Patricia Blair), the "Debutant of the Season", for that evening. Norman gives Joey a tuxedo with tails and a top hat. Homer the Chauffeur (Rolfe Sedan) arrives to pick up Joey. Because he doesn't want the neighbors to see him in the tuxedo, Joey switches "uniforms" with the chauffeur. Joey arrives at the restaurant and sits with Barbara and Norman. Norman introduces Joey to Gossip columnist Louise Kincaid (Nancy Kulp). Louise would like Joey to stop by her table to chat. On the way to her table, Joey runs into old friend Herbie Finster (Herbie Faye), who is now a busboy. Louise is upset that Joey wasted time with Herbie and writes an unflattering piece about him. The next day, Norman sets up a photo shoot for Joey and beautiful model Miss Blandings (Donna Douglas). Peggy comes by and makes things uncomfortable. Joey has had enough and is forced to put his foot down. Anthony Eustrel as Headwaiter. Note: Last episode for the characters of Larry, Stella, Mrs. Barnes and Peggy.

=== Season 2 (1962–63) ===
All season 2 episodes were broadcast in color.

No. overall	No. in season	Title	Directed by	Written by	Original release date
33	1	"The Honeymoon"	James V. Kern	Iz Elinson, Fred S. Fox	September 15, 1962
Joey announces on his show that he will be getting married the next day. He then brings out his future bride, Ellie (Abby Dalton). The couple plan to spend their honeymoon at Niagara Falls. Freddy (Guy Marks), Joey's manager and writer, tells him that Danny Thomas called and wants a favor from Joey. Danny would like Joey to substitute for him in his Las Vegas show on Joey's wedding night. Joey says he won't do it. The next morning, Joey and Ellie get married. At their apartment, Ellie meets the buildings superintendent, Mr. Jillson (Joe Besser). Freddy says Danny wouldn't take no for an answer. Joey manages to get Ellie to want to go to Las Vegas. But now he has to find a way to tell her he's doing the show. Joey finds out that Ellie knows about the show and is OK with Joey doing it. Note: First episode for the characters of Ellie and Freddy.
34	2	"Penguins Three"	James V. Kern	Fred Freeman, Garry Marshall	September 22, 1962
Mr. Jillson tells Ellie that Joey's been made an honorary Penguin in the Penguin Lodge. Jillson also promised his Lodge that Joey will perform there on Saturday. Joey shows Ellie tickets he got for a show she wanted to see and they're for Saturday night. Joey says he won't perform at the lodge. A disappointed Jillson reminds Joey of all the things he's done for him. Even Ellie wants Joey to perform. The next day, Hilda the maid (Mary Treen) says her husband is a Penguin and she was hoping to see Joey at the lodge. Freddy comes by and does his impersonation of a fly. Jillson uses his power as Superintendent to try to change Joey's mind. Joey eventually agrees to do the Penguin show. Note: First episode for the character of Hilda.
35	3	"Three's a Crowd"	James V. Kern	Harry Crane, Stan Dreben	September 29, 1962
It's Ellie and Joey's three-month wedding anniversary. Joey has just finished his show and Ellie calls him at the studio. She tells Joey she wants an intimate dinner and to not bring Freddy home. Joey tries to give Freddy a hint not to come by. Joey comes home with flowers and not long after, Freddy crashes in with champagne. Ellie is upset. The next morning, Freddy is still there. Ellie insists that Joey tell Freddy not to show up for dinner that evening. Joey is about to tell Freddy, when Freddy brings up how old their friendship is and the time he saved Joey's life. That evening Joey comes home and tells Ellie that Freddy will be there soon. But, Joey has a plan to make Freddy not come over every night. He serves Freddy a dinner of concentrated food pills and then it's a quiet evening of chess. Freddy leaves, but comes back later with a pizza, which they all dig into.
36	4	"Door-to-Door Salesman"	James V. Kern	Iz Elinson, Fred S. Fox	October 6, 1962
Joey wants Ellie to stop her irresistible desire to buy things she doesn't need from every door-to-door salesman with a hard-luck story. Joey sees a salesman coming down the hall. This is a perfect time to get used to saying no, Joey tells Ellie. Ellie is so close to turning the man down, but then winds up buying his product. Later, Ellie tells Joey she went the whole day without buying something. But, she says that the salesman is coming back because she promised him he could be on Joey's show. Ellie has no idea what his talent is. Salesman Charles Porter (Fuzzy Knight) comes by and continually flatters Joey. Joey agrees to put Charlie on the next nights show. After he leaves, Ellie asks what Charlie does. Joey doesn't know. On the show, Charlie performs and does a great job. A few days later, Charlie comes by and gives Joey what he thinks is a gift. Turns out Ellie bought one of his products.
37	5	"Joey's Replacement"	James V. Kern	Harry Crane, Stan Dreben	October 13, 1962
Joey is going on vacation for a week. Freddy tells him that he found someone to fill in for him, a comedian named Johnny Edwards (Corbett Monica, in his first of 73 appearances on the show). Joey says he's never heard of him. Freddy tells Joey that the sponsor, Mr. Hendricks (Paul Maxey), saw Johnny's act and thinks he'd be perfect. Joey goes to see Johnny's act. Johnny is very funny and the audience loves him. Joey begins to worry that Johnny could take over his job permanently. Johhny comes by Joey's apartment and tells Joey that he's scared to go on TV. Joey talks Johnny into not doing the show. Johnny tells Joey how glad his is to have met him. Joey feels bad and now talks Johnny into doing the show. Because of his success filling in for Joey, Johnny is given his own show. Joey Faye appears as a waiter.
38	6	"The Fashion Show"	James V. Kern	Harry Crane, Stan Dreben	October 20, 1962
Ellie secretly takes a temporary job as a model in a fashion show to earn the money for a 4-month anniversary gift for Joey. Ellie's old friend and now new boss Roger Fellows (Patrick Waltz) is coming by to pick her up. Joey and Freddy unexpectedly show up. From the other room, Ellie mentions Roger's name. When Joey asks who Roger is, Ellie says he's the plumber. Ellie keeps trying to leave to meet Roger down in the lobby. But, Joey keeps asking her to do things. Ellie finally leaves and Joey tells Freddy that she's acting peculiar. Joey suspects Ellie is seeing someone else. The next morning, Ellie has to leave, so she rushes Joey's breakfast. Joey decides to follow Ellie. Joey and Freddy wind up at the fashion show and meet Roger. Roger explains what Ellie is doing there. Joey surprises Ellie by buying the dress she is modeling for her. Eleanor Audley as Fashion Announcer.
39	7	"The Breakup"	James V. Kern	Harry Crane, Stan Dreben	October 27, 1962
Joey ends his show with an impromptu playing of his mandolin. Freddy didn't like Joey ending his show that way and they have a big argument. At home, Joey tells Ellie he's done with Freddy. Ellie calls Freddy, tells him Joey's sorry and invites him over for breakfast. She then tells Joey that Freddy called to apologize and she invited him for breakfast. The next morning the men realize that neither one apologized. They now childishly return items they have given each other. It's the night of their weekly putting contest and Joey is sure Freddy will show up. Freddy shows up for another reason. He has a chance for another job and needs a character reference. While having a petty conversation, Joey fills out the reference form and puts it in an envelope. Freddy leaves but soon returns angry. He read all the bad things Joey said about him. Turns out Joey wants Freddy to come back. Freddy will only come back if Joey never plays the mandolin on the show again. Joey agrees. They then have an argument over who puts first in the contest.
40	8	"A Woman's Place"	James V. Kern	Iz Elinson, Fred S. Fox	November 3, 1962
On his show, Joey tells several jokes about how women shouldn't be in politics. Ellie and her women's political club friends are upset and offended by Joey's jokes. Ellie decides to run for assemblyman and will demand equal time on his show. When Joey refuses, Ellie makes him sleep on the living room couch. The next morning Freddy comes by. Freddy comes up with a plan to embarrass Ellie on television. He tells Joey to ask her difficult questions about the U.S. Constitution. She'll have to quit politics. Hilda overhears the plan and tells Ellie. Ellie decides to study up on the Constitution before the show. On the show, Ellie answers every question in great detail making Joey look silly. Eleanor Audley as Mrs. Fitch. Shirley Mitchell as Clubwoman. Joanne Rio as Clubwoman.
41	9	"Baby, It's Cold Inside"	James V. Kern	Harry Crane, Stan Dreben	November 10, 1962
Jillson wins an Eskimo dog in a jingle contest. He would like Joey and Ellie to watch the dog for a week. Apparently Jillson agreed to take Mrs. Walters' cat for a week while she is in Miami Beach. The two animals fight "like cats and dogs". Joey reluctantly agrees. That night, Snowball won't go to sleep and he keeps Joey and Ellie up. It turns out that the dog is fresh from the Arctic and needs to be slowly acclimated to indoor temperatures. They turn off the heat in the apartment. When Joey tries to turn the heat up a little, Snowball barks at him. Ellie suggests trading places with Jillson. But, Joey reminds her that his apartment is full of other animals and plants he's won. When they get to Jillson's apartment, it's like a tropical rain forest. After the week is over, Jillson says that Mrs. Walters will be one day late and could Joey watch the cat. Jillson brings up the cat and it's a tiger cub.
42	10	"Joey Takes a Physical"	James V. Kern	Iz Elinson, Fred S. Fox	November 17, 1962
Ellie apologizes once again to the doctor for Joey breaking another appointment with him. She says Joey just won't go to a doctor unless he thinks something is wrong with him. Ellie tells the doctor she has a plan to make Joey think he's sick. She enlists Freddy and Jillson's help in her elaborate scheme. They get Joey to believe he's losing his hearing and sense of taste. Joey agrees to see the doctor, but then figures out it was all a trick. Later, Freddy brings over old vaudeville star, Max Collins (Benny Rubin), to visit Joey. Max says he's been adding hypnotism to his act. Max hypnotizes Freddy and gets him to do several stunts. Joey doesn't believe it and thinks the two of them staged the whole thing. Max hypnotizes Joey and makes him think he is a bullfighter and then a baseball pitcher. Freddy has Max give Joey a post hypnotic suggestion to go see the doctor. Turns out Joey wasn't really hypnotized and he tells Ellie he saw the doctor that morning and everything is fine.
43	11	"Deep in the Heart of Texas"	James V. Kern	Harry Crane, Stan Dreben	November 24, 1962
Joey tells Freddy that Ellie is very homesick for Texas. He asks Freddy to see if he can get a week off from the show to take her there. At home, Joey suggests to Ellie that she go to Texas by herself as he can't get away from his show. But, Ellie won't go without him. Freddy tells Joey to bring Texas to her. Freddy and Joey decorate the apartment with Texas paraphernalia. Ellie comes home and is thrilled. Her favorite group, The Frontiersmen and Joanie, come out and sing a song for her. Freddy is dressed as a Native American and sings a song. Gunfighter Jillson shows up. Joey sings "You are my Sunshine".
44	12	"The Honeymoon Is Over"	James V. Kern	Iz Elinson, Fred S. Fox	December 1, 1962
Joey tells Ellie that some guys from his childhood came by the studio. He mentions that he'll be spending an evening out with the boys. When Ellie tells Hilda Joey's plans, Hilda says that it's the first sign that "the honeymoon is over". Joey leaves and Ellie says that's the first time in 6 months he's left without kissing her goodbye. Joey comes back, but it's because he forgot his wallet. Joey comes home at 5:30 in the morning. Ellie is upset. Later that day when Joey wakes up, Hilda gives him a hard time. An angry Ellie serves Joey breakfast in curlers and a face pack. Freddy comes by and tells Ellie that while out with the boys, all Joey could talk about was his wonderful wife. Ellie makes up with Joey.
45	13	"Chance of a Lifetime"	James V. Kern	Harry Crane, Stan Dreben	December 8, 1962
Freddy and Joey are at the local gym, but only Joey is working out. Knowing that Joey's been looking for an investment, Freddy shows him Willie Foster (Peter Lupus). Willie wants to be a professional boxer, but he's only had one amateur fight. Joey is impressed by Willie's display of physical prowess. Joey talks to his trainer, Charlie (Herbie Faye). Joey would like to invest in Willie and be his manager. Later, Joey tells Ellie he bought Willie's contract. Ellie is already thinking of ways to spend the money they're going to make. Freddy is having a hard time getting Willie a fight and expenses are starting to add up. Charlie finally gets Willie a fight. The night of the fight, Joey gives Willie a good luck tap on the chin and knocks him out. Apparently, Willie has a glass jaw.
46	14	"Joey's Lucky Cuff Links"	James V. Kern	Story by : Fred Freeman & Garry Marshall; Teleplay by : Fred S. Fox & Iz Elinson	December 15, 1962
Joey is to perform a show for the governor. He is trying to rehearse his speech, but he keeps getting interrupted. When Joey goes to get dressed, he can't find his lucky cuff links. He won't perform without them. Ellie says they may be at the laundry as Hilda took all his shirts there that morning. Joey goes to Trilby's laundry. Natalie Trilby (Jane Dulo) and Mildred Cosgrove (Muriel Landers) recognize Joey. Joey is pressed for time, but the women keep talking. Mildred thinks the whole thing is a trick. The women come to believe that they are on a hidden camera show. When the women tell Joey they know about the camera, he plays along. Joey tells them they could win a prize if they find his cuff links. They start searching and Ellie walks into the store and tells Joey she found the cuff links. Joey does the governor's show and is a big hit. Ellie tells him that the cuff links he's wearing she just bought at a store. Natalie and Mildred come by with the cuff links and want to claim their prize.
47	15	"Wife vs. Secretary"	James V. Kern	Iz Elinson, Fred S. Fox	December 22, 1962
Joey has been spending a lot of evenings working late at the office. Ellie decides to surprise Joey and bring him a home cooked meal to the office. Joey introduces Ellie to his new secretary, Cindy Roberts, who happens to be quite beautiful. When Ellie finds out Cindy isn't married, she decides to stay instead of going to a movie. Sensing that Ellie is jealous, Joey sends Cindy on an errand. He tells Ellie that Cindy means nothing to him. Ellie still hangs around. Ellie now makes a habit of showing up at the office. Freddy doesn't help matters by saying how beautiful Cindy is. Joey realizes that he has to fire Cindy to keep Ellie happy, but he has no cause. Freddie convinces Joey to make a pass at Cindy to get her to quit. The next night, Joey tries to get romantic with Cindy, but she doesn't seem interested. But after Cindy has some champagne, she starts chasing Joey around. Ellie comes in and catches the two embracing. Cindy tells Joey she's quitting. Ellie is furious until Freddy explains everything to her.
48	16	"Kiss and Make Up"	James V. Kern	Iz Elinson, Fred S. Fox	December 29, 1962
Ellie tells her friend Doris that she and Joey have not yet had an argument. Doris tells her that a make-up kiss is the best kind of kiss. Joey comes home from work and Ellie tries repeatedly to start a fight. But Joey keeps apologizing for everything that Ellie brings up. When Ellie leaves the room, Joey tries to figure out what's going on. The next day, Ellie tells Doris she had no luck getting Joey to fight with her. Joey tells Freddy that it seem as though Ellie wanted an argument. Freddy tells him to give her an argument, it might ease some tension she's having. Joey comes home and tries to start a fight. But now Ellie apologizes and tries to be nice. When Ellie asks Joey why he's acting that way, he says he's only doing it because he thought that's what she wanted. Ellie tells him about what Doris said about make-up kisses. Something Joey intentionally says about Ellie's mother gets her mad. They have a little fight and Ellie gets her make-up kiss.
49	17	"Double Time"	James V. Kern	Stan Dreben, Ralph Goodman	January 5, 1963
Joey gives a performance at a prison for its inmates. Afterwards, the Warden (Addison Richards) thanks Joey and invites him and Freddy to dinner. But, Joey has plans. Light Fingered Louie, a prisoner who is an exact look-alike to Joey, sees his opportunity to escape. Louie knocks Joey out and trades places with him. Louie gives two guards, Willy (James Edwards) and Charlie (Patrick Waltz), his autograph and spells Joey wrong. Willy and Charlie find Joey and put him in a cell with Kowalski (Sheldon Leonard). A dazed Joey tries to explain who he is to Kowalski. Meanwhile, Freddy and Louie arrive at the apartment. Freddy and Ellie notice Louie's strange behavior and they think Joey may be sick. When they leave the room, Louie sneaks out of the apartment. The real Joey shows up and some confusion follows. Two policeman come to the door with Louie. He had taken Freddy's wallet. Johnny Silver as Styles.
50	18	"Jillson and the Cinnamon Buns"	James V. Kern	Iz Elinson, Fred S. Fox	January 12, 1963
Jillson is on a diet. Joey promises that if he loses 5 pounds, he can be on Joey's show. Jillson appears on the show. Joey goes on to talk about how Mrs. Jillson called everyone in the building and told them not to give Jillson any cinnamon buns. Jillson comes to Joey's apartment and begs him for a cinnamon bun, but Joey refuses him. Desperate, Jillson goes and buys every cinnamon bun that he can find and hides them in some apartments in the building. Hilda catches him hiding buns in Joey's apartment but agrees not to say anything. Both Joey and Ellie smell cinnamon. Freddy comes by and they find the buns stashed around the apartment. When Jillson can't find the buns, Joey makes him promise to stay on his diet, which he does. Back on the show, Joey gives Jillson a check that every guest gets. Joey says he doesn't want Jillson to buy cinnamon buns with the money. Jillson says he won't, but he'll buy jelly donuts.
51	19	"Freddie Goes Highbrow"	James V. Kern	Stan Dreben, Ralph Goodman	January 19, 1963
Freddy tells Joey that he's in love with Leslie Medford Wallingford (Merry Anders). While talking to her on the phone, he uses a faux British accent. He arranges to meet her at Joey's home. Freddy thinks that Leslie is high society, so he'll act like a high society gentleman. Joey says he should just be himself. That evening, Leslie arrives before Freddy. Joey and Ellie find out that Leslie is not high society. Her name is Shirley Mitchell and Leslie Medford Wallingford is just a stage name. She is actually a model who lives in a one-room flat. Freddy arrives in a top hat and tails. He performs a comical one-man opera routine in Joey's living room. Instead of going to a fancy restaurant, Joey insists on going to the Stage Deli. There Freddy learns about Shirley. Note: This was Guy Marks' last appearance in this series. The character Freddy was never again even mentioned.
52	20	"Joey Leaves Ellie"	James V. Kern	Dick Chevillat, Ray Singer	January 26, 1963
Joey has Gloria Colby (Joi Lansing), a beautiful female judo expert, on the show. She demonstrates how women can defend themselves from men that attempt to overpower them. Gloria ends up kissing Joey on the air. Ellie is at home watching the show and is not happy. The next morning, Ellie tells Joey how embarrassing it was to see Gloria kissing him. Even Hilda gives Joey a hard time. Because Joey insists on continuing to have pretty women on his show, Ellie threatens to go stay with her mother in Texas. He doesn't really plan on it, but Joey says that he'll go stay with Larry. Ellie doesn't stop him and Joey then has to leave. Joey is at Larry's place when Gloria comes by. Joey won't leave in case Ellie calls, so Larry goes to get pizza. Ellie comes by to make up and then sees Gloria. Larry comes back and a misunderstanding causes him to smash the pizza into Joey's face. Note: Corbett Monica joins the cast as Larry Corbett, which is a new character, replacing Freddy (Guy Marks) as Joey Barnes' best friend and head writer.
53	21	"Ellie, the Talent Scout"	James V. Kern	Iz Elinson, Fred S. Fox	February 2, 1963
Joey is annoyed because Ellie keeps bringing people over to audition for his show in their living room. Mrs. Fenton (Marjorie Bennett) comes by and sings a song accompanied by finger cymbals. Henry Schultz (Henry Gibson), the butcher, does poetry. Joey has had enough and leaves with Larry. Jillson is disappointed that Joey left because he brought his wife's nephews, a talented singing quartet, by for an audition. Ellie comes up with a plan to have the men audition without Joey realizing it. The next night, she puts her plan into action. Joey eventually figures out what's going on. But Ellie finally hits the jackpot because the men are very good. Joey tells them they'll have a spot on his show. Mrs. Fenton comes by again and this time she's added cymbals on her knees.
54	22	"A Crush on Joey"	James V. Kern	Fred Freeman, Garry Marshall	February 16, 1963
Little girl Penny has a crush on Joey. Jillson brings Penny to Joey's place to get his autograph. Michael, a boy Penny's age, comes by. He asks Penny why she likes Joey more than him. Michael and Joey hatch a plan to make Penny dislike Joey. They'll have Jillson bring the children to a rehearsal for Joey's show. The plan will be to have Joey pretend to be a tyrant and abuser of his employees. The plan works and Penny says she doesn't like Joey anymore and wants to leave. Later, Penny comes by Joey's apartment and tells him that Michael told her what Joey did was just an act. She kisses Joey and says she still loves him. Milton Frome as Chuck, Joey's Director. Joanne Rio as Script Girl. Billy Barty as Midget.
55	23	"Joey's House Guest"	James V. Kern	Dick Chevillat, Ray Singer	February 23, 1963
Ellie's Aunt Cecilia (Isabel Randolph), with whom Joey does not get along, sends a telegram saying she's coming for a two week visit. Joey tells Jillson not to mention the telegram to Ellie. Joey has Larry pretend he has broken his leg outside of the apartment and he'll stay in the guestroom for two weeks. Then Cecilia would have to stay in a hotel. Joey initially prevents Ellie from calling a doctor. Larry has Joey waiting on him hand and foot. Later, Ellie surprises Joey by calling Dr. Kurtzman (Benny Rubin). Larry and Joey prevent the doctor from examining Larry. Aunt Cecilia shows up and mentions the telegram and staying two weeks. Ellie figures out what Joey is up to. Joey confesses to his plot. But when Larry leaves the room, he really does break his leg.
56	24	"We're Going to Have a Baby"	James V. Kern	Dick Chevillat, Ray Singer	March 2, 1963
It's the middle of the night and Ellie tells Joey that she is expecting a baby. Joey is pretty much asleep and doesn't comprehend what Ellie is saying until a little later. The next morning, Joey tells Jillson and Larry the good news. That night, Joey promptly tells everyone in his television audience the blessed news. Gifts start arriving to the apartment. Joey tells Ellie that he feels a little bad as he didn't make the announcement just to get presents. Henry the butcher comes by with a present and recites a poem. The gifts keep coming and someone even sends a pony. Joey tells Ellie he enrolled in a expectant father class. Jack Kasten (William Keene) comes to the door and Joey thinks he's from the expectant father class. After Joey brags about how much all the gifts are probably worth, Jack explains that he's from the IRS. Gordon Jones as 1st Delivery Man.
57	25	"The Baby Formula"	James V. Kern	Dick Chevillat, Ray Singer	March 9, 1963
Mrs. Bennett (Mary Grace Canfield) leaves her baby with Ellie while she goes to tend to her sick mother. Joey comes home and then Henry the butcher makes a delivery. Joey is out of the room and Henry gives Ellie a recipe for turkey stuffing. Henry then recites a poem about babies. A little later, Larry comes by. Ellie has to go to a doctor's appointment. Joey says he's doing very well in Expectant Fathers' class, so she decides he can watch little Bobby for a while. Bobby starts crying and Joey and Larry have no luck getting him to stop. Jillson comes by and says the baby needs some formula. Joey and Larry follow what they think is the formula recipe, but it's the turkey stuffing recipe. Jillson comes in the kitchen and tells them they're making turkey stuffing. Joey's glad Ellie wasn't around to see what they did, but then she comes home. The men pretend they're eating a lunch that Larry whipped up. Ellie tastes it and loves it.
58	26	"Joey's Dramatic Debut"	James V. Kern	Harry Crane, Stan Dreben	March 16, 1963
Joey lands a part in a dramatic picture and he is to play a soldier whose furlough is turned down. Larry thinks Joey should stick with comedy. Larry goes on about how he will be out of a job if Joey stays with drama. On the movie set, Joey meets Boris Kinkoff (Leonid Kinskey), the director. Then the actor who plays Colonel Rodgers (Peter Leeds) shows up. Joey finds the transition from comedy to drama more difficult, and painful, than he had anticipated.
59	27	"Joey and the Laundry Bag"	James V. Kern	Iz Elinson & Fred S. Fox	March 23, 1963
Joey has to drop some clothes off at the laundry for Ellie. But, he's not happy about it because every time he goes there, Natalie Tribly and Mildred Cosgrove audition to be on his show. After Joey leaves, Ellie calls the laundry and tells them Joey is on the way. The women threaten to put starch in Joey's shorts if they don't get on the show. They then do a song and dance number for Joey. Joey says they can be on the show as long as they don't sing and dance. Also, they can't mention their own laundry shop. Larry gives Joey some laundry jokes. That night, Joey brings out Natalie and Mildred and they have a conversation about their jobs. Natalie keeps trying to tell the address of their store, but Joey stops her. Joey lets them do their song and dance number. The women insist Joey dance with them. The women then sing about their store and give out the address.
60	28	"The Masquerade Party"	James V. Kern	Iz Elinson, Fred S. Fox	March 30, 1963
Ellie tells Hilda how stubborn Joey can be. He wants to go as a Matador to a masquerade party. Ellie wants him to go as Robin Hood and her as Maid Marian. And with Larry and Jillson as Merrymen, they're all certain to win first prize. Larry comes by and tells Joey he should go as Robin Hood. The night of the party, Larry comes by dressed as a Merryman. Ellie has on her Maid Marian outfit. She tells Larry that she talked Joey into going as Robin Hood. Joey comes out as Robin and says how much he hates the outfit. Jillson arrives as Friar Tuck. Joey says he's changing into the Matador outfit. Ellie tells the others that she tightened all the seams on the Matador costume. Joey bends over and his outfit tears. Ellie lets it slip that she took in the seams. Joey says he's still going in the outfit. Joey wins first prize as the "Matador that Lost".
61	29	"Joey, the Good Samaritan"	James V. Kern	Ray Singer & Dick Chevillat	April 6, 1963
Natalie Tribly and Mildred Cosgrove, the two laundresses, speak to Ellie because Joey hasn't come by in a while. Mildred has a niece, Gladys, and she has a boyfriend named Archie. Mildred would like to have Archie's sister, Gina, sing on Joey's show. They would like Ellie to get Joey to come by so they could talk to him. Joey goes to the laundry and when he hears that Gina sings opera, he says no. Natalie and Mildred show up at Joey's apartment with Gina. Gina sings a Rock 'n Roll song and Joey says she can be on his show that night. After Joey leaves, Gina starts crying and says she wants to sing opera. Ellie tells her to sing whatever she wants. That night, Gina sings opera and the audience loves her. The next day, Natalie and Mildred come by Joey's place and Mildred dances in a ballerina tutu.
62	30	"My Son, the Doctor"	James V. Kern	Iz Elinson, Fred S. Fox	April 13, 1963
Joey believes he's going to have a son and that he will be a great doctor. Ellie and Hilda think that Joey is being a little premature about the baby's career. Larry comes by and complains about Joey calling him at 3AM to tell him that the baby will be a doctor. Larry thinks the kid should be a lawyer and Hilda says an actor. That night, Joey practices prenatal influence on Ellie by repeating "our son is going to be a doctor" in her ear while she sleeps. Ellie has a dream about her son as a doctor operating on Mr. Jillson. Ellie and Hilda are nurses and Larry is a doctor. Ellie wakes up and tells Joey about the dream. Joey tells Ellie about him performing prenatal influence on her. Later, when she thinks Joey is asleep, Ellie whispers in his ear that the baby will be a girl.
63	31	"The Expectant Father's School"	James V. Kern	Fred Freeman, Garry Marshall	April 20, 1963
Joey tells Ellie about the dos and don'ts he learned in expectant father class. Joey brags to Larry and Ellie that not only did he pass the class, but he was voted class "vale-diaper-torian". Jillson delivers a package to Joey, and Joey brags to him about his award. Joey then lets Jillson have a cinnamon bun. The package contained books for the baby. Joey makes Larry taste test some formulas he's creating. Larry challenges Joey by saying anyone, including himself, can do as well taking care of a baby. Joey then runs Larry through a series of tests. Later that evening, Jillson brings Joey his diploma from school. Gordon Jones appears as a delivery man.
64	32	"The Baby Nurse"	James V. Kern	Iz Elinson, Fred S. Fox	April 27, 1963
Joey catches Larry getting jokes out of a book instead of writing original ones. Ellie tells Joey they need to hire a baby nurse soon. Ellie is still upset that Joey won't let Hilda be the nanny. Larry says he dated a woman who was a nurse and Joey tells him to call her. Barbara Marshall (Yvonne Lime) comes to the apartment for her interview. Turns out Larry made a mistake, Barbara isn't a nurse, she was a receptionist for a doctor. Ellie keeps pushing for Hilda to be the nurse. Jillson tells Joey and Ellie he's building a playpen for the baby. Jillson also pushes for Hilda, but Joey knows Ellie put him up to it. Joey gives in and agrees to Hilda. Hilda does set a few ground rules. The doctor calls and says he has found a nurse for Ellie. The nurse has excellent references, and Ellie and Hilda start to worry. But Joey says he already has a nurse.
65	33	"My Buddy, My Buddy"	James V. Kern	Stan Dreben, Ralph Goodman	May 4, 1963
Joey gets a prank call in the middle of the night from his old friend, Buddy Hackett. The next morning, Buddy shows up at Joey's door. Buddy says he has a gift for the baby and brings in a baby elephant. Buddy gives Jillson his secret to losing weight, celery. Buddy asks Joey if he could be on Joey's show. That night, Joey introduces Buddy to his TV audience. The two talk about some of the silly things they used to do. Joey does mention that he thought Buddy would pull one of his practical jokes on the show. And Joey's glad that Buddy kept things dignified. Buddy then proceeds to pull off his tux to reveal striped underclothes. The next morning a Policeman (Milton Frome) comes to Joey's door. Joey tells Ellie he lent Buddy his car after the show. Then to prank Buddy, Joey reported the car stolen. But Buddy gets the last laugh, because Buddy sold the car to Danny Thomas, leading to his arrest. Buddy shows up and Danny and him say the whole thing was staged and it wasn't even a real cop.
66	34	"The Baby Cometh"	James V. Kern	Dick Chevillat, Ray Singer	May 11, 1963
While awaiting the baby's arrival Joey tries to appear calm and cool, but in reality he's a bundle of nerves. The Doctor (Frank Wilcox) checks in on Ellie and tells Joey she is due within the week. Larry comes by and Joey continues to act calm, but he answers the phone when the door bell rings. It's Jillson at the door and he asks how Ellie is doing. Just then, Ellie says it's time to go to the hospital. Joey panics and he actually starts to take Hilda to the hospital. He comes back for Ellie. In the waiting room, Joey and the other prospective fathers complain about how long they've had to wait. One expectant Father (Mickey Manners) says he's been waiting three days. He then realizes he's at the wrong hospital. Another can't remember his name. A nurse tells Joey that Ellie had the baby. It takes a little while, but Joey finds out it's a boy. Natalie Masters as First Nurse. Patrick Waltz as Expectant Father. Note: First episode for the character of Joey Barnes, Jr., played by Abby Dalton's real-life infant son Matthew David Smith.

=== Season 3 (1963–64) ===
All season 3 episodes were broadcast in color.

No. overall	No. in season	Title	Directed by	Written by	Original release date
67	1	"Joey and Milton and Baby Make Three"	James V. Kern	Iz Elinson, Fred S. Fox	September 14, 1963
To open the show, Joey describes his new baby boy and then introduces guest star Milton Berle. Joey gets a call from the hospital and he can bring Ellie and the baby home early. Larry reminds Joey that he has rehearsals with Milton Berle tomorrow. Joey goes to Milton's place and asks him if he can rehearse today. Milton says he has too much to do today. Joey tells Milton about bringing the baby home and Milton says he's an expert on babies. Milton starts to instruct Joey on the in's and out's of being a first time father. Milton shows Joey his child's nursery and all the elaborate toys. The room also has a wall sized picture of Milton. Milton then shows Joey the safety devices in the room. Back at home, Joey has Hilda sterilizing the apartment and Jillson putting in a special doorbell. Milton comes over to rehearse and convinces Joey to cancel the show so he can be home the first night the baby is there. Joey calls his sponsor to let him know and the sponsor says it's OK. The sponsor says he got Milton to fill in.
68	2	"The Baby's First Day"	James V. Kern	Harry Crane, John Tackaberry	September 21, 1963
Joey is about to pick up Ellie and Joey Jr. from the hospital. Before he does, he's cleaning every bit of the house. Larry and Jillson come by and there is some confusion about which switch turns things on in the baby's room. Joey and Larry bring Ellie and the baby home. Joey wants to wake up the baby, but Ellie says no. When the baby does wake up, Joey starts taking pictures. Joey insists that everyone who comes near the child must wear a mask. He goes to the drug store to buy some masks. At the store, Joey tries on a mask. A woman who sells cosmetics (Sandra Gould) sees him and thinking he's a crook, she faints. The Pharmacist (William Keene) comes out from the back and starts yelling for the police. The woman comes to and faints again. The police arrive and arrest Joey. Joey takes off his mask to show the police who he is, but they don't recognize him. Larry comes by and they take him into custody as well. Because the police chief knew who Joey was, they get released. Back at home, the woman who sells cosmetics comes to the door and when she sees Joey, she faints again. Al Lettieri as Policeman No. 2. Johnny Silver as Witness.
69	3	"Joey Plugs the Laundry"	James V. Kern	Dick Chevillat, Ray Singer	September 28, 1963
Joey complains that Hilda doesn't always do what he asks her to do. Jillson comes by with some stuffed animals that he made for Joey, Jr. Mildred (Muriel Landers) and Natalie (Jane Dulo) from the laundry stop by to deliver some clothes and ask how Ellie and the baby are. Then they proceed to flatter Joey and he knows there is an ulterior motive. The ladies would like to have Joey mention the Mil-Nat Laundry on his show because business has been slow. He says that he will. The next day, Hubert J. Hobbs (Herbert Rudley), the president of the Laundry Association, stops by. Hubert intends to sue Joey because he said that the Mil-Nat Laundry was the best, inferring the other laundries were bad. Hubert expects Joey to make a full retraction. That night, Joey reads some letters he's gotten from other Laundromats. Joey then says the Mil-Nat Laundry is not the best. The next morning, Attorney Harper (John Alvin) tells Joey the Mil-Nat Laundry is suing him. Joey speaks to Mildred and Natalie and they say to drop the lawsuit, he must do three shows at their laundry. Joey agrees to perform.
70	4	"Joey's Mustache"	James V. Kern	Sam Denoff, Bill Persky	October 5, 1963
Joey has been sick for almost two weeks and hasn't been on his show. He also hasn't shaved in that time. Frank the Barber (Vito Scotti) comes over to shave him, but he leaves a mustache on. Joey wants Frank to shave it off, but Frank calls it his masterpiece. Ellie and Hilda think Joey looks ridiculous, but Joey now wants to keep it. Jillson and Joey, Jr. don't like it either. Joey goes to the studio and Larry just laughs at him. Larry convinces Joey to save it off, but then Barbara the secretary comes in and says she loves it. Other women in the office love it as well. The next day, Ellie, Hilda, Larry and Jillson wear fake mustaches. They sing a song about shaving off the mustache. Joey tells them that he shaved his off after the show the night before. He had the makeup man put on a fake one.
71	5	"Danny Gives Joey Advice"	James V. Kern	Iz Elinson, Fred S. Fox	October 12, 1963
Jillson drops off some packages to Joey's apartment and mentions how he's looking forward to seeing Danny Thomas on Joey's show that night. Joey bought some more toys for Joey, Jr. Hilda, for the first time, asks Joey for tickets to his show because Danny will be on. Larry comes by with a lame excuse for why he doesn't have a monologue for that night's show. On the show, Joey would like Danny to talk about Joey, Jr. Danny tells Joey that he's spoiling his son. The next day, Joey fantasizes what his son would be like as a teenager. Teenage Danny shows up. The boys complain that their parents won't let them do anything. Larry, as an elderly man, comes by. The boys try to get some money from Larry, but he says he's broke. Joey, Jr. mentions that his dad threw away all of his records because the music is trash and nonsense. Elderly Jillson drops by and the boys try to get money from him. Back to reality, Danny comes by with a bunch of presents for Joey, Jr. Danny says he's changed his mind about spoiling the kids. Joey and Danny then play with the toys.
72	6	"The Baby Sitter"	James V. Kern	Harry Crane & Ernest Chambers	October 19, 1963
Hilda is leaving for a one week vacation. Ellie tells Joey that she has planned a date night out for Joey and her which will include dinner and dancing at the Copacabana. Ellie says that she has hired a baby sitter. Joey is worried about leaving the baby with a stranger for the first time. That night, Ellie gets a call that the baby sitter has to cancel. Jillson comes by and volunteers to baby sit, but Ellie doesn't think he's up to it. Since they can't go to the Copacabana, Joey will bring the Copa to them. Joey proceeds to entertain with jokes, dancing, impressions and singing. Hilda walks in and says she canceled her trip because she missed the baby. Joey and Ellie can now go out. Later, the couple comes home and Ellie is upset. Turns out that Joey spent the time entertaining at the Copa. Tommy Ivo as Page Boy.
73	7	"Joey's Lost What-Cha-Ma-Call-It"	James V. Kern	Harry Crane & Ernest Chambers	October 26, 1963
Joey comes home and finds Ellie preoccupied looking for something. She tells Joey that they received a letter from the hotel where they recently stayed. It states that they'd left something of value behind. If they can identify the item, the hotel will return it to them. Neither Ellie nor Joey can't think of what it might be. Joey says they should just forget about it. Ellie tells him to go to the hotel and demand they return whatever it is. Joey leaves with Larry. At the hotel, Joey speaks with Mr. Holland (Sterling Holloway), the desk clerk. Mr. Holland will not let Joey look around the storage room. Larry comes up with a plan to get Joey into the store room, but it doesn't work. Back at home, Joey has the idea to pack again and maybe think of what is missing. Jillson gets confused when Joey says he's packing but not going anywhere. Ellie figures out that they're missing a suitcase with the initials JB on it. Joey goes to the hotel and asks Mr. Holland for the suitcase. Mr. Holland says another man claimed it. Joey finds the other man and it's Jack Benny.
74	8	"Joey Meets Edgar Bergen"	James V. Kern	Harry Crane, John Tackaberry	November 2, 1963
Edgar Bergen is a guest on Joey's show. Edgar talks to Charlie McCarthy, who insults Joey. Edgar then has a comical conversation with Mortimer Snerd. After the show, Larry tells Edgar and Joey a joke, but it flops. Larry leaves and Edgar teaches Joey some ventriloquism tricks. Joey decides to play a practical joke on everyone at home by making them think a three month old baby can talk. Ellie thinks she has a superior baby and keeps trying to get him to say something else. Joey isn't home when Edgar comes by with a gift for the baby. Edgar happens to mention that he taught Joey a little ventriloquism. Ellie now knows she's been tricked. She gets Edgar to help get back at Joey. Note: This episode contains a mistake, in which Edgar Bergen refers to Joey Bishop's character Joey Barnes as "Joey Bishop".
75	9	"Joey's Surprise for Ellie"	James V. Kern	Stan Dreben, Ralph Goodman	November 9, 1963
Joey shows Larry the black wig he bought for Ellie. He bought it because he heard some fashion experts say that is what every woman wants. Both Ellie and Hilda are suspicious of Joey's motive for getting the wig. This causes a little spat. Then Larry comes over and gives Ellie false eyelashes, which doesn't help the situation. Later, Ellie is still mad and Hilda comes out wearing the wig. A hurt and angry Joey says he was just trying to be nice and storms out of the apartment. Ellie comes to the studio wearing the wig. She makes up with Joey and they go for a date at a night club. But once there, it is revealed where he may have gotten his inspiration. Beverly Adams as Cigarette Girl.
76	10	"Joey and the Andrews Sisters"	James V. Kern	Harry Crane, Garry Marshall	November 16, 1963
Joey and Larry go to a club to see The Andrews Sisters perform. They're to be on Joey's show the next night. After their show, Patty Andrews realizes that Joey wants them on his show so he can sing with them. The problem is he is not a very good singer. In Joey's office, the girls come up with a plan. No matter what Joey says to them, they'll pretend to be insulted and leave. That plan doesn't work. Larry tells the sister's to just be honest with Joey. They tell Joey they'd rather he didn't sing and he says he understands. After they leave, Joey is clearly disappointed. Larry tells him that he just doesn't have a good singing voice. Larry says that even he can sing better than Joey. Joey makes a cash bet with Larry. Larry sings and wins the bet. That night on Joey's show, the sisters sing "(I'll Be with You) In Apple Blossom Time". The girls change their minds and they let Joey sing with them on one verse. The sisters then sing "Bei mir bist du schön".
77	11	"Joey Jr.'s TV Debut"	James V. Kern	Dick Chevillat, Ray Singer	November 30, 1963
Joey Jr. is making his TV debut from home on that evenings show. Ellie is a little worried about doing the show from home and she doesn't want to be on TV. Jillson comes by with a gift for the baby. Then Larry brings a gift, but says he would've bought a nicer gift if he got paid more. Larry and Hilda are looking forward to being a part of the show. But Joey says it's just for family. The equipment for the show starts arriving. Charlie the cameraman (Charlie Cantor) complains about having to do the show from the apartment. It's show time and Ellie freezes on camera. Things become amusing when Larry, Hilda and Jillson all sneak in some camera time. Admitting he can't sing, Joey proceeds to sing a song to the baby. Larry, Hilda and Jillson come out and sing a different song while Joey is still singing. Note: This episode was pre-empted due to the coverage of the Assassination of John F. Kennedy on November 22, 1963.
78	12	"Bobby Rydell Plugs Ellie's Song"	James V. Kern	Harry Crane, John Tackaberry	December 14, 1963
Joey has Bobby Rydell as a guest on his show and they talk about growing up in the same neighborhood. Bobby then sings That Old Black Magic. After the show, Larry tells Joey that Ellie is going to be mad at him because he didn't get Bobby to sing the song that Ellie wrote. Ellie sees it as a hit if Bobby is the one who records it. Joey says that Ellie's song is the worst ever written. Joey will tell Ellie the show ran long and there just wasn't time. Joey invites Bobby over for dinner. Back at the apartment, Ellie has a band there so Bobby can hear her song. Before Bobby gets there, Joey says he'll sing her song so she can hear how bad it is. Ellie does agree the song's not that good. Mr. Cosgrove (Charlie Cantor), the landlord, comes by and complains about the noise and Joey's singing. Bobby arrives and puts his own spin on the song. He also believes it could be a hit and wants to record it. Gene DiNovi as Piano Player.
79	13	"The Baby's First Christmas"	James V. Kern	Iz Elinson, Fred S. Fox	December 21, 1963
Joey shows Larry the Santa suit he's going to wear for his son Joey, Jr. Meanwhile, Ellie promises Jillson that he can play Santa Claus for Joey Jr. since Jillson plays Santa for all the children in the building. Ellie learns from Larry that Joey intends to play Santa. Joey walks into the kitchen dressed as Santa. Ellie, Larry and Hilda are afraid to tell Joey about Jillson. They try to drop subtle hints that Joey isn't the right type to play Santa. Jillson walks in and is disappointed when Joey insists on playing Santa. Joey later decides that Jillson should play Santa because it would mean so much to him. Larry comes by and tells Joey that either Jillson plays Santa or he'll quit his job. Joey tells Larry the news. Jillson comes by and says he understands about Joey wanting to be Santa. Instead of telling Jillson that he changed his mind, Joey stages a Santa contest that Jillson wins. At the end of the show, the cast wishes the audience a Merry Christmas.
80	14	"Ellie Gives Joey First Aid"	James V. Kern	Stan Dreben, Ralph Goodman	December 28, 1963
Ellie has a first aid demonstration to do and wants Joey's help. She puts his arms in casts, but then remembers she doesn't have any cast clippers to get them off. Jillson comes by and Ellie asks him if there is anything he can do. He suggests using a hacksaw and Joey tells him to leave. Larry arrives and tells Joey they'll just go to the hospital and they'll remove the casts there. At the hospital, the nurses recognize Joey and ask him how it happened. When his says his wife did it, they think Ellie broke his arms. The nurses start to fill out an admittance form and Joey says he doesn't need a room. The nurses will also not let Joey leave until a doctor discharges him. A very large orderly named Sheldon carries Joey to his room. Joey has been in the hospital over a day now. The head nurse tells Joey that Ellie has been by several times, but to protect Joey, they won't let Ellie see him. Joey insists they let Ellie in. Ellie gets jealous when a beautiful nurse pampers Joey. When Ellie tries to get the casts off with a knife, the nurse has Sheldon carry Ellie out. Joey eventually gets the casts off. Maidie Norman and Joan Staley appear as nurses.
81	15	"Jack Carter Helps Joey Propose"	James V. Kern	Harry Crane, Garry Marshall	January 4, 1964
Joey has old friend Jack Carter on his show. They talk about how animated Jack is and how deadpan Joey is. Jack then does some impersonations. After the show the two go to a restaurant and Joey wants to sit at a certain booth because that's where he was supposed to propose to Ellie. Flashback to that evening. Jack and his wife (Paula Stewart) are waiting for Joey and Ellie. Ellie shows up and complains how Joey is always late. She says that Joey always comes up with a joke as an excuse. Paula says when you marry someone in show business, you have to get used to that. Joey finally shows up. Herkie Styles comes by and asks Jack and Joey for some jokes. The women leave to fix their hair. Barbara (Merry Anders) comes by and asks Joey to fill in for Buddy Hackett at a benefit. Joey reluctantly agrees and Barbara kisses Joey. Ellie sees this and storms out. The next day, Jack brings Joey to the Library where Ellie works to apologize. Ellie won't listen to Joey. It takes some doing, but Joey finally proposes and Ellie excepts. Jesslyn Fax as Woman in Library.
82	16	"Two Little Maids Are We"	James V. Kern	Dick Chevillat, Ray Singer	January 11, 1964
Ellie is taking the baby to see her mother in Texas and is taking Hilda with her. Despite Larry coming over to keep Joey company while she is gone, Ellie is still worried. Ellie tries to leave, but she keeps forgeting things and has to come back. Larry and Joey go shopping at the supermarket and have spent 4 hours there. A nice little old lady asks Joey for his autograph and he signs her package of liver. The Supermarket Manager (Vito Scotti), after recognizing Joey, offers to help him shop. While they are looking for something, a woman mistakenly takes their shopping cart. Now they have to start all over. A few days later, Joey doesn't want to go out to eat again and suggests cooking something themselves. They start to follow a recipe, but first they decide to thaw a frozen chicken in the oven. Things are not going well and then the chicken starts burning. They then cater a meal in. The next day, they go to the supermarket and this time they take things out of other peoples carts. Nora Marlowe as Shopper.
83	17	"Joey Gets Brainwashed"	James V. Kern	Story by : Danny Simon & Mel Diamond; Teleplay by : Danny Simon & Milt Rosen	January 18, 1964
Joey and Vic Damone are going on a tour to entertain troops. While riding on the train, Joey and Vic have staterooms next to each other. Vic sings "Sweet Someone" to Joey through the wall. Vic explains to his assistant Parnello (Mickey Manners) about learning a language off a tape while you sleep. Vic wants to learn Russian and plays the tape. Joey is asleep and hears the tape through the wall. The next morning, Larry comes to see Joey and Joey can also speak Russian. Joey can't understand what happened. He wonders if he was brainwashed during the war. He's afraid he might be used to spy on the base he's to entertain at. At the base, Vic tells Joey he'll be singing the Russian song "Ochi chyornye". Joey now grows suspicious when Vic says he's been to Russia many times. Larry goes to get the General (Barry Kelley). Joey tries to get the General to ask Vic about his trips to Russia. Joey changes his mind about Vic when he learns the State Department sent Vic to Russia. Joey then learns about Vic playing the Russian language tape on the train the night before. Patrick Waltz as Waiter.
84	18	"Joey's Hideaway Cabin"	James V. Kern	Paul Bregman, Harvey Helm	January 25, 1964
Joey is about to go on a weeks vacation. Ellie has picked out a place but has not told Joey where it is. Last vacation they went on, Joey mentioned the location to one person and the phone never stopped ringing. Ellie finally tells Joey about the rustic cabin she rented. The town where the cabin is isn't even on a map. Once they get to the cabin, Joey sees how really rustic it is and wants to leave. The cabin has a wood burning stove and water has to be pumped from a well. Larry has a family of goats living in his room. Everyone can get the water pump to work except Joey. Joey is getting frustrated and begs Ellie to leave. Joey tries one more time to pump the water and it starts to flood the cabin. Barney Fife (Don Knotts) shows up and brings in an inflatable raft.
85	19	"Zsa Zsa Redecorates"	James V. Kern	Iz Elinson, Fred S. Fox	February 1, 1964
Joey has Zsa Zsa Gabor on his show. The next morning Ellie tells Joey that she has finished decorating the baby's nursery. Larry comes by and is infatuated with Zsa Zsa. He intends on asking her out. Zsa Zsa comes by, Larry asks her for a date and she says yes. After Larry leaves, Zsa Zsa gives Ellie a gift for the baby. It's a rattle with diamonds inside. Zsa Zsa meets the baby and then volunteers to redecorate nursery. Ellie is against it as she has just finished it herself. Joey wants to let Zsa Zsa do it, because she is a good friend and always comes on his show. Later, Ellie insists Joey tell Zsa Zsa to stop the redecorating. Ellie's friend Susan (Jeanne Baird) comes by. Susan thinks Ellie should try and get Zsa Zsa to speak at their Women's Club. It could help Ellie become president of the club. Joey comes home and Ellie tries to stop him from telling off Zsa Zsa, but doesn't get the chance. Joey and Ellie see the redecorated nursery and it's done in a masculine jungle theme. Joey tells Zsa Zsa how horrible the nursery is and she leaves crying. But in the end, everyone is still friends.
86	20	"Double Play from Foster to Durocher to Joey"	James V. Kern	Sam Denoff, Bill Persky	February 8, 1964
Joey and Ellie meet Dodgers' coach Leo Durocher in a restaurant. The Dodgers need a Master of Ceremonies for a banquet and Leo would like Joey to get their number one Brooklyn fan, Phil Foster. Joey says he can't ask him because Phil has not forgiven the team for moving to Los Angeles. Leo insists and Joey says he'll try. Joey invites Phil over for dinner. Ellie tells Joey she invited Leo over as well. Phil arrives and then Leo shows up. Tempers flare and Joey tries to calm things down. Ellie serves dinner wearing a catchers mask and vest. After dinner, Joey tells Phil about being the MC for the banquet. Tempers flare again. Joey then volunteers to be the MC. Saying that Joey knows nothing about baseball, Phil agrees to be the MC.
87	21	"Joey Insults Jack E. Leonard"	James V. Kern	Jerry Belson, Garry Marshall	February 15, 1964
Famous insult comedian Jack E. Leonard guests on Joey's show. After the show, Joey tells Larry that if Jack insults you, that means he likes you. Jack comes by Joey's office and does nothing but compliment Joey. Jack then proceeds to insult Larry. Joey is then convinced Jack must be mad at him and is determined to find out why. Jack comes by Joey's place and starts to insult Jillson, Hilda, Larry and Ellie, but not Joey. Larry tells Joey to insult Jack and maybe that will get him going, but that doesn't work. It finally comes out that Jack is mad because Joey never thanked him for the teddy bear he sent the baby. Ellie shows Jack the gift list and his name is not on it. They go through all of the baby's teddy bears and Jack's isn't there. Jack wants Joey to meet him at the department store. They speak with the Floorwalker (David Ketchum). It turns out that Jack bought two teddy bears but only gave Milton Berle's address. Jack apologizes to Joey and to make Joey happy, he insults him.
88	22	"Joey the Comedian vs. Larry the Writer"	James V. Kern	Dick Chevillat, Ray Singer	February 22, 1964
Ellie reads in Variety magazine that Joey didn't win the TV Critics' award for Best Comedian again. Jillson says that Joey should have won. Larry comes by and tells Joey that he won the TV Critics' Best Comedy Writer award. This quickly goes to Larry's head, while he teases Joey for coming in 12th as Best Comedian. This leads to a fight between the two friends and Joey fires Larry. Joey proceeds to fire Hilda and Ellie. Joey later apologizes to Ellie and says he was kidding about firing her and Hilda. He tries to write his own monologue, but isn't getting too far. Ellie tells Joey to talk to Larry. After they apologize to each other, Joey agrees to give Larry his prize on Joey's show. They have quite a humorous exchange during the presentation. Robert Carson as Museum Guide.
89	23	"Joey and Roberta Sherwood Play a Benefit"	James V. Kern	Dick Chevillat, Ray Singer	February 29, 1964
Joey has Roberta Sherwood on his show and she sings (Up A) Lazy River. After the show, Joey tells Larry that he's tricked Ellie into thinking an event the next night is a benefit. But, actually Ellie's receiving a surprise "Mother Of The Year" award. Larry says he's bringing his girlfriend, Marilyn (Dawn Wells). It's the night of the event. Larry and Marilyn arrive at Joey's apartment. Ellie and Marilyn are wearing the same outfits, so Ellie goes to change. Roberta arrives and she's wearing the same outfit Ellie just changed into. Ellie goes to change again and then gets a bad case of the hiccups. Ellie now refuses to go. Everyone tries to cure Ellie's hiccups but it's Jillson that finally does it. At the benefit, Roberta sings You're Nobody till Somebody Loves You. Then a surprised Ellie is given the award. Her hiccups return but Joey finds a way to stop them.
90	24	"Joey and Buddy Hackett Have a Luau"	James V. Kern	Story by : Stan Dreben & Ralph Goodman; Teleplay by : Stan Dreben, Ralph Goodman, & Jerry Belsen	March 7, 1964
It's supposed to be Hilda's night off, but Ellie needs her as they are entertaining the sponsors that night. Buddy Hackett comes by but Ellie has to go out. He says he'll just wait by himself for Joey to show up. After Ellie leaves, Buddy makes a call and arranges to have all the furniture in the living room removed. Jillson comes by to paint in the kitchen. Buddy tells him that Ellie changed her mind about the color. She wants polka dot paint instead of the yellow. Later, Joey and Larry come home to see the empty living room. Buddy is laying on the floor, pretending to have a knife in his chest. He then tells Joey the furniture is in storage. Buddy says the sponsors deserve something more exciting, so he is going to set up a Hawaiian Luau. It's almost dinner time and everything is decorated. Buddy arrives riding a donkey and Joey tells him to get rid of it. The sponsors arrive and Buddy spends a lot of time rearranging the way everyone is sitting on the floor. But, Joey gets back at Buddy by cancelling the dinner with the sponsors. He then hired actors to portray the sponsors and guests. Peter Leeds as Mr. Montgomery.
91	25	"Hilda, the Maid, Quits"	James V. Kern	Iz Elinson, Fred S. Fox	March 14, 1964
Hilda calls the Domestic Employment Agency about a job for a friend of hers. After Hilda leaves, the Agency calls back. Joey and Ellie misinterpret the phone call and conclude Hilda is about to quit. They start to go overboard on making their maid's life perfect so she won't leave. Larry comes by and Joey asks him if he has gotten Hilda's color TV yet. Larry has no idea what Joey is talking about. After Hilda leaves the room, Larry asks Joey when he learned that Hilda was planning to quit. Joey continues to pamper Hilda. Jillson sees this and asks Joey when he found out Hilda was quitting. Joey tells Hilda that she needs an assistant. Joey tells Larry that he has to run all the jokes he writes past Hilda first. Hilda now believes that she is about to be fired. She decides to work even harder. Hilda finally confronts Joey and Ellie and the misunderstanding gets straightened out.
92	26	"Joey and the L.A. Dodgers"	James V. Kern	Jerry Belson, Garry Marshall	March 21, 1964
Joey is upset because he has no guest star for that evenings show. Because they're in town playing an exhibition game, Larry suggests some members of the 1963 World Series Championship Los Angeles Dodgers fill in. They're playing a 1pm game and should have plenty of time to do the show. Later, Joey and Larry are listening to the game that is now in the 27th inning. Larry does a rain dance and it actually starts raining at the ball park and the game is called. Six of the players make it to the show. First, Don Drysdale sings "I Left My Heart In San Francisco". Ron Perranoski finishes the song for Don. Ron, Frank Howard and Bill "Moose" Skowron then do a quick little dance. Willie Davis and Tommy Davis come out and do a dance. Tommy plays "Stella by Starlight" on the Melodica. All six then sing a parody version of "High Hopes". Frank then does a comical thank you to the audience. Vin Scully as Voice Announcer.
93	27	"Every Dog Should Have a Boy"	James V. Kern	Stan Dreben, Ralph Goodman	March 28, 1964
Joey has Ivan Henry and his trained dogs on his show. Joey mentions that he might get a dog. The next morning a dog is delivered to Joey from a fan. Jillson misunderstands something Joey says and thinks Ellie is having a girl. Then the delivery men drop off several dozen more dogs. Mr. Cosgrove (Charles Lane), the building manager, comes by and tells Joey the dogs have to go. Later, Larry makes a lot of dog jokes, while Joey tries to figure out what to do with the animals. Henry the butcher (Henry Gibson) drops off some meat for the dogs. He recites a poem called "Dogs are better than ants". Larry suggests Joey mention on his show that he'll be gifting the dogs to children who have their parents permission. The next day, Larry continues with the dog jokes and there's a large group of children wanting a dog. All the dogs are given away. Keith (Richard Keith) comes by wanting a dog. Keith asks about the dog Ellie is holding, but Joey says that is the family dog. Joey lets Keith have the dog. Peter Robbins as Peter.
94	28	"Weekend in the Mountains"	James V. Kern	Dick Chevillat, Ray Singer	April 4, 1964
Joey and Ellie are headed to the Catskills for the weekend. The lodge they are staying at is where Joey first started in show business with partners Al Fisher and Lou Marks. Once at the lodge, Joey starts reminiscing about working there ten years earlier. He tells Ellie about all the things he had to do when they weren't doing their comedy act. Flashback to one day after working really hard and they get to their room to rest. J.J. Gerard (Milton Frome), their slave driver boss, comes barging into the room. He tells them that it's raining outside and they will have to entertain the guests all afternoon. Joey, Al and Lou start their act and the cranky guests start heckling them. No matter what the three did, the audience hated it. Back to the present, Al and Lou join Joey and Ellie. J.J. Gerard asks the three men to entertain again for the lodge's 10th anniversary.
95	29	"Joey, Jack Jones and the Genie"	James V. Kern	Iz Elinson, Fred S. Fox	April 11, 1964
Joey has singer Jack Jones on his show and he sings "Wives and Lovers". After the show, Jack would like to go out to eat, but Joey is tired. Joey tells Jack that singer's have it easy. Back at home, Joey keeps talking about how he wishes he was a singer and have an easy life. He precedes to have a fantasy dream that night. In it, Ellie is a genie and she is there to grant Joey's wish to be a pop singer. Joey has a horrible singing voice so Ellie calls in genie Jack Jones for help. Even Jack thinks Joey has a bad voice and doesn't know if there's anything he can do. They turn him into a singer with a gimmick, Joey Grasshopper. Joey Grasshopper is hugely successful and is being interview by several reporters. On The Tonight Show, Ed McMahon introduces Joey. While performing, Joey hops around a lot. All the girls in the audience rush the stage and tear off Joey's clothes. Ellie wakes Joey up and he says he's glad he's not a singer. To close the show, Jack sings "Love With The Proper Stranger". Patrick Waltz as Reporter.
96	30	"Joey and Shecky Greene"	James V. Kern	Dick Chevillat, Ray Singer	April 18, 1964
Ellie thinks her butcher Herbie (Shecky Greene) is a talented comedian and brings Larry to see him at the store. They watch as Herbie does impressions and jokes for his customers. Herbie meets Larry and Ellie says she'll arrange an audition before Joey for Herbie. Ellie is going to have Herbie come by the apartment without telling Joey. But Joey surprises Ellie by telling her he's going golfing. Jillson, Hilda and Ellie try to talk him out of it. Ellie tricks her husband into going to the butcher shop. Joey thinks that he is just meeting a big fan of his. Herbie starts the audition in the meat locker, but it doesn't last long because Joey is freezing. Joey agrees to audition Herbie the next day. Herbie can't wait until the next day and shows up at Joey's apartment that night. He finishes the audition and Joey loves him. Dorothy Claire as Mrs. Belson.
97	31	"Andy Williams Visits Joey"	James V. Kern	Dick Chevillat, Ray Singer	April 25, 1964
Joey has Andy Williams on his show and Andy sings More. Andy then makes fun of Joey's singing. After the show, Joey reminds Andy that next week is the Ladies' Club dinner. Their wives have had Joey and Andy as "surprise" guest entertainers for the last five years. The men go to Joey's apartment and tell Ellie and Andy's wife, Claudine Longet, they are not going to perform this year. For the next few days, Ellie isn't speaking to Joey. Andy comes by and tells Joey that Claudine isn't speaking to him either. Claudine comes by and tells Ellie that they don't need their husbands as the Ladies Club has hired two other performers. Claudine whispers into Ellie's ear who was hired. The men don't believe the wives have someone else. Joey says if they have to perform, they'll do such a bad performance that they'll never be asked again. It's the night of the Ladies' Club dinner and the Chair-lady starts to introduce the entertainers. Joey and Andy get up on stage just as the Chair-lady announces Robert Goulet and Danny Thomas. Note: This is the last episode to be filmed in color due to the move to CBS.

=== Season 4 (1964–65) ===
All season 4 episodes were broadcast in black-and-white for this final season on CBS.

No. overall	No. in season	Title	Directed by	Written by	Original release date
98	1	"Joey Goes to CBS"	Jerry Paris	Jerry Belson, Garry Marshall	September 29, 1964
Joey and Ellie now live in a penthouse in their building. Ellie is chosen to tell Joey that his show has been cancelled. Joey comes home from golfing and Ellie starts crying. She finally is able to tell him what happened. Joey takes the news in stride but then starts crying when he gets to his room. The next day, Joey is depressed but says he can always work night clubs. Larry tells Joey to forget night clubs, he'll get Joey into the movies. Three weeks later and no movie deal. Larry then tells Joey that all the big night clubs are booked for months. But Larry says, despite the money not being as good, he has something that will book Joey for 26 weeks. Larry says it's the unemployment office. Ellie volunteers to go back to work and Hilda says she'll work for free. Joey says that's not necessary as he is not broke. Joey and Ellie decide to go out to the Stage Deli and everyone mentions Joey's show being cancelled. Joey gets a call from CBS and they ask him to come by their office. Joey comes home and everyone wants to know how it went. He makes them think he was asked to be a guest on a game show, but then tells them CBS gave him his own show. Sarah Selby as Autograph Seeker. Jerry Lewis makes a cameo appearance.
99	2	"Joey the Patient"	Mel Ferber	Douglas Morrow	October 6, 1964
Joey Jr.'s pediatrician, Dr. Sam Nolan (Joey Forman), lives in the same building. Because of this, Ellie calls him for any little thing the baby does. Ellie would also like to have Sam look at Joey Sr.'s throat because he's been having trouble swallowing. Sam says that Joey needs to have his tonsils out soon. Joey comes up with excuses, but Sam says he'll have the operation this coming Saturday. Larry thinks it's hilarious that Joey has to have his tonsils out. It's the day of the surgery and Joey is stalling. At the hospital, Joey meets young Benny Harwell (Richard Keith). Benny is a big fan and he gives Joey a coloring book and crayons. Benny just had his tonsils out. The operation is over and Dr. Marks (David Ketchum) and Dr. Fisher (Tim Herbert) check on Joey. Back at home, Larry, Hilda and Jillson give Joey a spinning top.
100	3	"Joey vs. Oscar Levant"	Mel Ferber	Iz Elinson, Fred S. Fox	October 13, 1964
Everyone in the apartment building is trying to avoid Oscar Levant due to his non-stop complaining. June Gale, Oscar's wife, will be away for a couple days and Ellie tells her that Oscar can stay with her and Joey. Hilda is stunned that Ellie invited Oscar and even more stunned when she finds out Ellie hasn't told Joey. Ellie is about to tell Joey when Jillson comes in complaining about Oscar. Dr. Sam Nolan comes by wanting to hide from Oscar. Joey starts to suspect Ellie is hiding something. Ellie tearfully tells Joey that Oscar is staying with them for three days. Oscar shows up with a large number of suitcases. Oscar starts to disrupt the Barnes household. The next night, dinner will be served late because Oscar took a sleeping pill. Larry's plan to wake Oscar up early doesn't work. Joey does wake him up, but it's not for long. Late that night, Oscar wakes Joey and Ellie up by playing the piano. Ellie tells Joey that June won't be back for another week.
101	4	"Joey and Larry Split"	Mel Ferber	Arthur Phillips	October 20, 1964
Joey forgets to wish Larry's new girlfriend Marlene happy birthday on his show the night before. She ends the relationship with Larry. Joey repeatedly says he's sorry but Larry is still mad at him. Ellie suggests that Joey call Marlene and apologize to her. Larry calls her, but Marlene hangs up on him. Later, Larry comes by the office and tells Joey he's ready to work. But it doesn't take long for Larry to bring up Joey's mistake. Larry decides to terminate their long association. The next day, Larry comes by and returns some gifts Joey gave him. Ellie shows Joey and Larry a scrap book they started as kids. When neither one wants to keep it, Ellie says she'll dump it in the incinerator. After she leaves, the two run to stop her. Ellie was waiting on the other side of the front door. Larry and Joey are friends again. Ellie says Joey will go to Marlene's apartment and apologize to her. Joey goes to Marlene's place and a man in a marine uniform named Harry (George Lindsey) answers the door. Harry recognizes Joey and tells him he's Marlene's boyfriend. Harry wonders why Joey brought flowers and candy. A misunderstanding occurs and Harry punches Joey in the face. Back at home, Ellie takes a picture of Larry pointing to the lump on Joey's face for their scrapbook.
102	5	"In This Corner, Jan Murray"	Mel Ferber	Dick Conway, Roland MacLane	October 27, 1964
Joey and guest star Jan Murray agree to put on a comedy boxing show for a boys club charity. Jan and his wife Toni (Barbara Stuart) visit Joey and Ellie. Jan has brought some comic boxing equipment. Larry comes by and says he's been asked to be the referee for the match. Later, Larry tells Joey that he saw Jan in Central Park and it looked like he was training for the fight. Larry says that if Jan wins the fight, he'll get all the publicity. What Larry and Joey don't know is that Jan was chasing his dog through the park. Jan calls Joey's house and Hilda tells him that Joey is at the gym training. Jan shows up at the gym and the two men try to out do each other with their training. It's the night of the fight and Ellie talks to Toni about how their husbands aren't talking to each other. While defending their husbands, the wives get into a fight as well. While they are fighting, the men talk about how each other started training for real behind each other's back. It comes out that Jan was chasing his dog in the park. They realize this all started because of Larry. The two then go after Larry. After the fight, Joey and Jan get into a little disagreement over who could of actually won. Joey Giambra as Boxer.
103	6	"The Nielsen Box"	Jerry Paris	Sam Locke, Joel Rapp	November 3, 1964
After Joey makes Hilda the butt of his jokes on his show, another of their little feuds erupts. Ellie tells Joey he better apologize to her. Meanwhile, Hilda calls Harry, a TV repairman, from a store with the name Nielsen. She has him install a UHF converter box on her TV set so she can watch the bull fights. Joey and Larry assume the box is from the Nielsen ratings company, which would make her an official Nielsen viewer. Joey tries to tell Hilda he's sorry. She says it doesn't matter as she intends to never watch his show again. Joey brings Hilda several gifts and then does the vacuuming for her. Ellie is thrilled when she gets two tickets to a popular Broadway show. Joey suggests that she take Hilda. Ellie wants to know what's going on and Joey tells her about the Nielsen box. Hilda confides in Ellie that she actually thought Joey's jokes were funny and she was just teasing him. Ellie mentions the Nielsen box and Hilda tells her what it really is. Before Ellie and Hilda leave for the show, Ellie mentions to a distracted Joey that the Nielsen box is a UHF convertor. It takes a while, but what Ellie said finally sinks in. The next day, Hilda says that Joey has to keep doing jokes about her on his show, as she is now getting fan mail.
104	7	"You're What, Again?"	Mel Ferber	Jerry Belson, Garry Marshall	November 10, 1964
Joey is heading off to work and Ellie avoids kissing him good-bye. Ellie tells Dr. Sam Nolan that she is expecting another baby and she hasn't told Joey yet. Ellie is afraid he'll panic as he did with Joey Jr. She doesn't want Joey to hug her because he'll be able to tell she's pregnant. At work, Larry notices that Joey is distracted. Joey tells Larry that Ellie doesn't love him anymore. She won't let Joey hug or kiss her. Ellie and Hilda are looking at some baby things in a suitcase. Joey and Larry come home early. Joey asks for a hug and Ellie puts the suitcase between them. Ellie continues to be evasive and then leaves to go shopping. The next day, Larry suggests Joey take Ellie on a second honeymoon. Larry even brought skiing clothes for her. When Joey tells Ellie about the trip, she starts crying and says she's not going. After a talk with Hilda, Ellie wants to tell Joey the truth. Ellie and Joey have a confusing conversation, but then it finally comes out that she is expecting. Ellie gets upset when Joey takes the news in stride and doesn't panic.
105	8	"Joey Goes to a Poker Party"	Mel Ferber	Carl Kleinschmitt, Dale McRaven	November 17, 1964
Joey has been stuck home baby sitting. When Larry tells Joey that he's going to play poker that night, Joey really wants to go. He has a hard time trying to ask Ellie if he can go. Ellie lets him go, if he promises to be home by midnight. When he gets to the game, the guys tease him about Ellie letting him out and what time he has to go home. Joey's been winning, but it's almost midnight. He's about to leave but the guys guilt him into staying. It's almost 6:30 in the morning when Joey finally gets home. Ellie is pretending to be asleep on the couch. She sees him changing the clock and closing the drapes. Joey wakes Ellie up and she says she'd like to go out for a midnight snack. He tries to convince her that he had made her a sandwich and she went back to sleep after eating it. They head off to bed and Joey changes the clock on the night stand. After Joey falls asleep, Ellie turns the tables on him and sets the clocks ahead. She wakes Joey up, but he is dead tired. Ellie makes him think he ate breakfast and then starts to send him off to work. When he sees the milkman at the door, Joey realizes that Ellie pranked him. Allan Melvin as Bernie. Johnny Silver as Charlie.
106	9	"The Perfect Girl"	Mel Ferber	Carl Kleinschmitt, Dale McRaven	November 24, 1964
Joey and Ellie are host to an attractive young woman named Liz (Shirley Bonne). Larry has been dating her for a couple weeks and the two are growing quite fond of each other. One morning Larry tells Joey that he thinks Liz is trying to trap him into marriage. He gives Joey all the examples of things she did, but Joey thinks Larry is just misinterpreting what she meant. Larry thinks that Joey and Ellie are plotting to get him married. Larry wants Joey to tell Liz that it's over between them. Joey and Ellie are talking about how it's a same that Larry and Liz will break up. Jillson hears them talking and thinks Ellie and Joey are breaking up. Joey and Ellie play along and then pretend to make up. It takes Joey a while, but he finally tells Liz that Larry won't be seeing her anymore. It's not that Larry doesn't care for her, it's just he's not ready for marriage. Later that night, Liz is out and Larry comes by. Larry realizes he was wrong and is in love with Liz. Joey and Ellie lie and say Liz is out with another man. Liz comes home and Larry tells her he loves her and she says she loves him. Ellie admits she made up the story about Liz being on a date. Larry tells Liz that they are engaged.
107	10	"Joey's Courtship"	Mel Ferber	Charles Stewart	December 1, 1964
Larry tells Ellie that Joey advised him to marry Liz right away. Ellie mentions the fun and romance of a long courtship. Joey feels bad because his and Ellie's courtship wasn't very long at all. Ellie tells Joey she understands that there were things they couldn't do while courting because Joey was so busy with his career. But then she proceeds to say that he could've found a little time to do some things. Ellie starts to get angry and storms off. She also lets Joey know he'll be sleeping on the couch. The next day, Larry tells Joey it's never too late to court Ellie. Larry suggests some things Joey can do including going to a quiet place like Grant's Tomb. That night, Joey brings Ellie some flowers, a Kewpie doll and a love note. Joey dims the lights and starts to get romantic but then Jillson comes to the door. Several other interruptions occur. Joey then takes Ellie to a park and they sit on a bench. Ellie would like Joey to propose again, but then a Policeman (Allan Melvin) comes by and asks them to leave. When he realizes they are married, the Policeman lets them stay. Joey then proposes to Ellie, surprising the Policeman. Larry sends Liz a letter saying he would like a long courtship. She sends him a telegram saying she doesn't want to wait and goodbye forever.
108	11	"Ellie Goes to Court"	Mel Ferber	Carl Kleinschmitt, Dale McRaven	December 8, 1964
Ellie tells Joey that she got a ticket for an illegal left turn during a certain time. She claims that she turned after that time expired. Ellie decides to go to court to contest a traffic ticket she insists is unjust. The next day, Ellie and Hilda time themselves doing exactly what Ellie did the day of the ticket to prove what time she turned. Larry and Joey think she should just pay the fine. Jillson comes by with some law books for Ellie. She wants Joey to be a witness because he took her watch to the jeweler and it didn't need any repairs. When Joey doesn't want to do it, Ellie serves him with a subpoena. In court, Ellie presents her case to the Judge (Parley Baer). The Prosecutor (Stacy Harris) calls the policeman to the stand. Ellie's questioning of the policeman doesn't go well. Joey is called to the stand. Joey is accused by the Prosecutor of being a witness for publicity and Ellie comes to his defense. Ellie wins the case based on her argument of timing according to her watch, until she realizes her watch is running fast. Joey gives her the money to pay the fine.
109	12	"Jillson's Toupee"	Mel Ferber	Carl Kleinschmitt, Dale McRaven	December 22, 1964
Joey buys Jillson a toupee for his birthday. Later, Ellie and Hilda laugh when they hear about Jillson's toupee. They mention the toupee to Joey and he tells them that he bought it. When Jillson comes by, Ellie tries to be subtle and compliment him. Jillson says he wanted a toupee because people started making fun of his baldness. Larry comes by and starts laughing at Jillson. Joey signals to Larry and then Larry compliments Jillson. After Jillson leaves, Larry says that he hopes Jillson's personality won't change. Ellie tells Joey that there will be a meeting at their place. Tenants of the apartment house are complaining that Jillson is too busy admiring himself to do any work. If he gets reported to the landlord, he'll lose his job. Joey agrees to talk to Jillson. But Jillson says he would rather lose his job than his new hair. The children of the building say they're sad because Jillson no longer has time to play with them because he's so busy with his hair. This changes Jillson's mind and he gets rid of the toupee. Joey gives the toupee to Joey Jr. William Keene as Salesman. Sarah Selby as Iris Simpson. Bob Carson as Jim Simpson. Peter Robbins as Other Child.
110	13	"A Hobby for Ellie"	Mel Ferber	Iz Elinson, Fred S. Fox	December 29, 1964
Ellie has given Hilda two weeks off. Joey doesn't want Ellie doing any housework while she is pregnant. Joey says he'll do it and starts by vacuuming. Larry comes by and Joey says that he'll cook dinner for him. Larry decides to go out to eat. Ellie has to explain everything on how to cook the dinner to Joey. The next morning, Joey makes a mess cooking breakfast. Larry suggests that Ellie take up a hobby to occupy her time. Larry mentions clay modeling, but Joey goes with painting. Meanwhile, when Joey isn't around, Ellie does some housework. Joey brings home the painting supplies and shows Ellie what to do. Larry comes by with clay modeling supplies and shows Ellie how to shape things. But it's Joey and Larry who start creating art, turning it into a destructive competition.
111	14	"Rusty Arrives"	Mel Ferber	Carl Kleinschmitt, Dale McRaven	January 5, 1965
Joey's nephew Rusty Williams (Rusty Hamer of "Make Room For Daddy") is coming to stay with Joey and Ellie. Jillson comes by and brings a bunch of teenage records for Rusty to listen to when he arrives. Larry comes by and Joey tells him not to make fun of the sloppy way Rusty may dress. Larry tries to teach Joey some of the slang words teenagers use. Rusty arrives in a suit and tie and he conducts himself like a well-behaved gentleman. It's been a week since Rusty arrived and Joey and Ellie are shocked he's still acting so refined. Joey tells Rusty to start acting like a typical teenager. Rusty tells Joey that his father gave him strict instructions to act this way. Joey gives Rusty permission to be a teenager, but Joey might not be ready for what happens. Rusty says he's having a party at the apartment and when he tells Ellie how many people might be coming, she panics. A bunch of musicians arrive. Joey and Ellie try to make enough food for the crowd. They then watch all the kids dancing and bring out Joey Jr. to watch.
112	15	"The Weed City Story"	Mel Ferber	Carl Kleinschmitt, Dale McRaven, Charles Stewart	January 12, 1965
Ellie talks a reluctant Joey into going to play in a golf tournament. On the way to the tournament, Joey and Larry stop in the small town of Weedsville. The hotel manager, Tom Weed (Cliff Arquette as his Charlie Weaver character), recognizes Joey as a celebrity. Tom would like to have Joey around for the ground breaking ceremony for the new post office, but that's a couple days away. Tom talks Joey into staying at the hotel for the night because the roads are bad at night. Joey asks for an 8 o'clock wake up call, but Tom lets them sleep until noon. Then Joey's car has a leak in the fuel line and the local mechanic is out of town. Later in the day, Tom tells Joey about a train that goes through town, but doesn't tell him that the train doesn't stop here. The tournament is the next day and despite it being 90 miles away, Joey says he'll walk. Tom is also the local Sheriff. He deputizes his friend Art Frisbee (Burt Mustin) and sends him out to bring Joey and Larry back. Back at the hotel, Joey believes Tom has an ulterior motive for keeping them around. Tom confesses to his scheme. When Tom says they could fly the two to the tournament in time, Joey agrees to be at the ground breaking. Joey brings home the shovel he used at the ground breaking.
113	16	"Rusty's Education"	Mel Ferber	Carl Kleinschmitt, Dale McRaven	January 19, 1965
Rusty tells Joey that he's flunking History in college, but he'll just drop the class. Rusty also says he just as soon drop college altogether. A friend of his wants Rusty to play drums in his band. Ellie lies and tells Rusty that Joey went to Penn State. Rusty decides to stay in school and he figures Joey can help him with his studies. Rusty now asks Joey questions that Joey doesn't know the answer to. Larry brings by convicted bookmaker Inagain Finnegan (Charlie Cantor). Inagain has a photographic memory and he worked at the jailhouse library. Joey will pay him so that anytime Joey needs an answer, he'll just call Inagain. Joey has been making a lot of calls to Inagain. Police Lt. Bernie Stern (Peter Leeds) and Police Sgt. McCornick (Allan Melvin) have been listening in on Inagain's phone conversations. They think Inagain has been taking bets in code and go to arrest him. Joey calls Inagain and gets no answer. Joey tells Rusty he's still thinking about the question and Rusty tells him to call Inagain. Rusty found out about Inagain because he called earlier to tell Joey he's been arrested. Ellie confesses that Joey never went to college. Rusty is still grateful for their help. Joey goes to get Inagain out of jail.
114	17	"The Sultan's Gift"	Mel Ferber	Jerry Belson	January 26, 1965
The State Department asks Joey to perform for a visiting Sultan. Afterwards, Joey tells Ellie that the Sultan enjoyed the show so much that he will send Joey some gifts. Punjab (Mickey Simpson) and Danjab (Ray Kellogg) arrive with the gifts which turn out to be two Harem girls. Ellie wants them sent back, but Joey doesn't know how to go about doing it. The next day, Joey goes to the State Department and speaks with Charlie Clayton (Frank Wilcox). Charlie says there will be a lot of protocol and red tape to go through. Larry volunteers to take the girls off Joey's hands. Ellie becomes furious when Joey says it might be a while before the girls are gone. Joey finally tells the women to leave. Minutes later Punjab and Danjab arrive and say that the Sultan sends his apologies for disrupting Joey's household. They then bring in a baby elephant. Later, Ellie says she wasn't really jealous it was just too crowded with the two girls. After she says she wouldn't have minded one girl, Hilda walks in dressed in a Harem outfit.
115	18	"Joey Entertains Rusty's Fraternity"	Mel Ferber	Carl Kleinschmitt, Dale McRaven	February 2, 1965
Rusty tells Joey and Ellie that he, Jerry, Bill and Pete are pledging a fraternity. The first part of the initiation stunt was to bring four dates to the initiation dance. The second part is that the dates have to be older guys dressed as women. Joey volunteers to be Rusty's date, but the other guys are from out of town and don't know anyone. Joey tells Rusty he'll get three other guys. Joey is playing poker with Larry, Al (Cliff Norton) and Dr. Sam Nolan. Joey gets the guys to play "Make A Wish" poker. Whoever wins a hand can tell the other three to do something and they have to do it. When Joey wins a hand, he wishes that the other three would go to their apartments and come back wearing dresses. At first the men refuse, but when Joey says they'll never play poker at his place again, the men comply. When the men return, Joey tells them the real reason for dressing up. The men understand and agree to go as the dates. The guys put on wigs and makeup. Jerry, Bill and Pete arrive, are introduced to their dates and leave for the dance. The boys pass their initiation and are welcomed to the fraternity. Michael Winkelman as Pledge.
116	19	"The Do-It-Yourself Nursery"	Mel Ferber	Carl Kleinschmitt, Dale McRaven	February 9, 1965
Ellie has rehired temperamental Krupnik (Herbie Faye) to redo the nursery. She has promised Krupnik that she will make sure Joey doesn't bother him. The last time Krupnik did work for them, Joey knocked over a bucket of paint. Ellie tells Joey that he needs to be out of the house all day. Ellie leaves to run errands. Joey goes to apologize to Krupnik and winds up asking him a lot of questions. Joey then says that he would like to watch him work for a little while. Krupnik storms out. Joey decides to finish the nursery himself. Larry comes by and winds up helping. While putting up wallpaper, Larry's sandwich winds up between the paper and the wall. The guys get the wallpapering done and start putting down the flooring. Ellie comes home and sees the finished room. But then the wallpaper and the flooring start peeling off. Ellie manages to get Krupnik back. To make sure Joey doesn't bother him, she handcuffs herself to Joey.
117	20	"The Sergeant's Testimonial"	Mel Ferber	Carl Kleinschmitt, Dale McRaven	February 16, 1965
Jillson brings Ellie Joey's old Army uniform from the cleaners. Joey is going to an Army reunion that evening. Joey tries on the uniform and it's a little tight, so Hilda has to let it out a bit. Larry, Al and Art Miller (Allan Melvin) show up in their uniforms. The guys make fun of Joey's mandolin playing while they were in the service. Jillson comes by dressed in his WWI Army uniform. Larry informs Joey that he is to give a glowing testimonial to Sergeant Murdock (Barry Kelley), the man who made his life miserable while he was in the army. Joey refuses to attend the reunion and tells his friends the moments of conflict between him and the Sergeant. Joey was endlessly given KP duty by Murdock and once he had to clean the barracks with a toothbrush. The guys also decide to stay home. Joey then figures he should go and tell everyone what he really thinks of Murdock. Joey changes the speech he was to give and really criticizes the Sergeant. At the reunion, the Captain (Tyler McVey) introduces Murdock. When Murdock has some kind words for Joey, Joey has a change of heart about the Sergeant.
118	21	"Joey Changes Larry's Luck"	Mel Ferber	Jerry Belson	February 23, 1965
Ellie is away visiting her Mother. Larry's run of bad luck has shaken his confidence so Joey talks Art and Al into letting Larry win big at poker. The next day, Larry tells Joey how lucky he feels. He also says that he bought $2000 worth of Jack Pot Sulfur stock. Because the stock was so cheap, he wound up with 16,000 shares. Larry wants to partner with Joey, Al and Art. Joey tells Larry the truth about the poker game. At first Larry doesn't believe Joey, but Joey manages to convince him. Joey, Larry, Art and Al are in a restaurant. They're talking about the stock and how they'll each have to come up with $500. A waiter overhears about the stock and tells another waiter what Joey bought. Word starts to spread around the restaurant and gets exaggerated as it goes. The next day Art calls Joey and tells him that the stock has gone way up. Joey says that he sold the stock after leaving the restaurant and they took a loss. Larry comes by and says how rich they are, but Joey tells him what he did. Gene Baylos as First Waiter.
119	22	"Never Put It in Writing"	Mel Ferber	Story by : James Allardice & Tom Adair; Teleplay by : Tom Adair, James Allardice, Carl Kleinschmitt, Dale McRaven	March 2, 1965
Ellie is still away visiting her mother. Joey tells Hilda that after many years of service, he has decided to give Larry his own office. And to show how grateful he is, Joey also hired an additional writer to assist Larry. At work, Joey shows Larry his new office and Larry is quite happy. But Larry is not happy when Bernie Stern (Bobs Watson), the new writer, shows up. Joey tries to explain that Bernie is there to make Larry's job easier, not because he's there to replace Larry. Joey is about to fire Bernie, when he remembers that the two signed a one year contract. Larry wonders why he doesn't have a contract and Joey says friends don't need one. Larry insists on a contract and Joey draws one up. Larry just wanted to see if Joey would actually do it and crumples up the contract. Later, Larry says he took the contract to a lawyer who said it's worthless. He had the lawyer draw up a legally binding contract. Joey wants to add a few stipulations about joke quality to the contract. Later in the day, both men want to make up, but can't bring themselves to do it. Larry comes up with an idea. He sets the contract on fire and puts it in the waste bin. Larry tells Joey whats burning. The men shake hands and make up and Larry gives Bernie his office.
120	23	"Larry's Habit"	Mel Ferber	Story by : Sam Locke & Joel Rapp; Teleplay by : Carl Kleinschmitt, Dale McRaven	March 9, 1965
Larry is staying at Joey's home while Ellie is away. It's the middle of the night and Joey can't sleep. Joey tells Hilda that Larry has a knuckle cracking habit and he even does it while he's sleeping. Larry wakes up and finds Joey watching TV and having milk and cookies. Larry starts to crack his knuckles. The next morning, Jillson tells Joey he looks tired. Joey begins exhibiting eccentric behaviors whenever Larry cracks his knuckles. Larry talks to Art Miller and they jump to the conclusion that Joey is reverting to childhood. Art suggests they contact the Police psychiatrist, Dr. Rangle (Frank Wilcox). Larry comes up with the plan to have Dr. Rangle pose as a reporter to surreptitiously examine an unsuspecting Joey. Dr. Rangle comes by Joey's place and begins the interview. Joey begins to wonder why he asks personal questions. Joey asks Larry what's going on and Larry confesses that Rangle is a psychiatrist. Now that Joey knows the truth, he plays along and pretends to have symptoms of mental illness. Rangle makes an appointment for Joey to see another psychiatrist the next day and he leaves. Joey then tells Larry that his symptoms are do to Larry's knuckle cracking and gives him the card with the appointment for the other doctor.
121	24	"Joey the Star Maker"	Mel Ferber	Jerry Belson, Garry Marshall	March 16, 1965
Ellie is still at her mother's and Larry is on vacation. Art and Dorothy Miller (Barbara Stuart) take Joey to an amateur theatrical performance given by the policeman's wives. The three come back to Joey's place. Joey over praises Dorothy talents to Hilda. After the Millers leave, Joey confesses to Hilda that Dorothy really wasn't that good. Late that evening, Art wakes Joey up and asks him to launch Dorothy's show business career by giving her a spot on Joey's show. Joey tries to come up with an excuse to not help Dorothy. But when Art gets upset, Joey agrees to give her a little part. Mr. Beatty (Robert Carson), Joey's sponsor, is not happy that Joey wants to put an unknown actress in his commercial. Joey is going to direct the soap commercial and Dorothy is playing a scrub woman. Several takes later and things are not going well. Art is there watching and he starts causing problems. Art then drags Dorothy away, leaving Joey to fill in for her.
122	25	"What'll You Have?"	Mel Ferber	Carl Kleinschmitt, Dale McRaven	March 23, 1965
Larry is cooking Italian food for Joey's dinner party. Joey has to play Italian songs on his mandolin while Larry cooks. Jillson comes by with more ingredients for Larry. Art and Dorothy Miller and Alice and Dr. Sam Nolan arrive. Joey brings out the champagne and toasts to their friendship. Sam toasts to Joey, Ellie and the forthcoming baby. Art Miller toasts to Joey and Ellie having another baby boy. Joey says "I'll drink to that" and Ellie gets upset because she wants a girl this time. The party breaks into an argument over the baby and the women side with Ellie. Between the "son-of-a-guns" and "boy-o-boy-o-boys", the men are getting in deeper and deeper. Larry gets Joey and Ellie to make up. It's not long before the fight starts up again. Suddenly, Ellie says it's time to go to the hospital. Everyone is in the waiting room and it's been 2 hours. The nurse finally comes in and says Ellie had a girl. Johnny Silver as Mr. Beaumont. Note: The baby girl in the show is Kathleen Kinmont, the daughter of Jack Smith and Abby Dalton.
123	26	"Joey Discovers Jackie Clark"	Mel Ferber	Carl Kleinschmitt, Dale McRaven	March 30, 1965
Joey has young comedian Jackie Clark on his show and everyone raves about him. Joey tells Jillson that because of his success on the show, Jackie is getting a gig at the Copa Cabana. Larry comes by and tells Joey that Jackie won't be doing the gig because his mother won't let him. She doesn't even want Jackie in show business. She wants him to keep his job as a Postal Clerk. Joey, Ellie and Larry decide to go and talk to her. Jackie introduces the three to his mother, Mrs. Schwartz (Naomi Stevens). The three each try to convince her that Jackie would be happier in show business, but she isn't going for it. She finally says it's OK to be a comedian, but she wants his promise he'll never work in a night club. Then Mother says work in night clubs, just don't come home late. Joey invites Mrs. Schwartz to go to Jackie's opening night. At the club, everyone is having a good time. Jules the M.C. (Wendell Niles) introduces Joey, who then brings out Jackie. Jackie does his routine, which everyone enjoys and then he brings his Mother on stage. After his first show of the night, Mother says how proud she is and she'll stay out late for his next two shows.
