= The Joey Bishop Show (TV series) =

American sitcom (1961–1964)

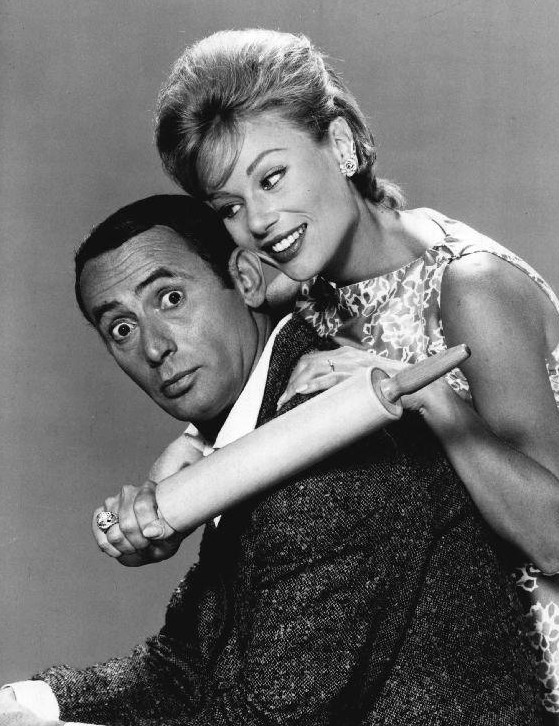
- Joey Bishop and Abby Dalton (1964)
- Genre: Sitcom
- Created by: Danny Thomas; Louis F. Edelman
- Written by: Harry Crane; Stan Dreben; Fred S. Fox; Fred Freeman; Irving Elinson; Garry Marshall
- Directed by: Mel Ferber; James V. Kern; Jerry Paris
- Starring: Joey Bishop; Abby Dalton
- Theme music composer: Vincent Youmans (1961–62); Irving Caesar (1961–62); Jimmy Van Heusen (1962–65); Sammy Cahn (1962–65)
- Opening theme: "Sometimes I'm Happy" (1961–62) "Joey" (1962–65)
- Composer: Herbert W. Spencer
- Country of origin: United States
- Original language: English
- No. of seasons: 4
- No. of episodes: 123 (list of episodes)

Production
- Executive producers: Danny Thomas; Joey Bishop
- Producers: Milt Josefsberg; Marvin Marx; Charles Stewart
- Cinematography: Henry Cronjager, Jr.
- Running time: 24 minutes
- Production company: Bellmar Enterprises

Original release
- Network: NBC
- Release: September 20, 1961 – April 25, 1964
- Network: CBS
- Release: September 29, 1964 – March 30, 1965

Related
- The Danny Thomas Show

The Joey Bishop Show is an American sitcom starring entertainer Joey Bishop that aired on NBC from September 1961 to April 1964. After NBC canceled the series because of its low ratings, it was aired by CBS for its fourth and final season.

Danny Thomas served as the series' executive producer. The Joey Bishop Show is a spin-off of Thomas' series The Danny Thomas Show.

== Overview ==
=== Season 1 ===
The series was conceived as a vehicle for entertainer Joey Bishop by Danny Thomas and Louis F. Edelman in 1960. At the time, Thomas was starring in his own series, Make Room for Daddy (later known as The Danny Thomas Show), airing on CBS. Thomas' series was then a top-20 hit and served as a launching pad for The Joey Bishop Show. The series' pilot episode, titled "Everything Happens to Me", aired on March 27, 1961, during the eighth season of Danny Thomas. In the pilot, an incompetent Hollywood "public relations man" named Joey Mason (Bishop) forgets to make proper accommodations for an exhausted Danny Williams (Thomas) after he arrives in Los Angeles to play a show. Joey is then forced to put Danny up in the home he shares with his colorful parents, Mr. and Mrs. Mason (played by Billy Gilbert and Madge Blake) and two unmarried sisters, Betty (Virginia Vincent) and aspiring actress Stella (Marlo Thomas).

By the time the series was picked up by NBC, Bishop's character's name was changed to Joey Barnes (Bishop had insisted his character and he share the same initials) and the character of Joey's father was dropped. Two additional characters were added; a younger brother named Larry (Warren Berlinger), and brother-in-law Frank (Joe Flynn), the husband of Joey's older sister Betty. The series' first incarnation features Joey, a well-intending but hapless and trouble-prone young man, who works for the Hollywood public relations firm, Willoughby, Cleary and Jones. The firm is headed by J.P. Willoughby (John Griggs), Joey's demanding boss. Willoughby's secretary, Barbara Simpson (Nancy Hadley) has an unrequited crush on a mostly oblivious Joey. Joey lives with and supports his widowed mother, Mrs. Barnes and younger siblings, aspiring actress Stella and medical student Larry. Joey also supports his older sister Betty and her proudly unemployed husband Frank whom Joey tries to encourage to get and keep a job.

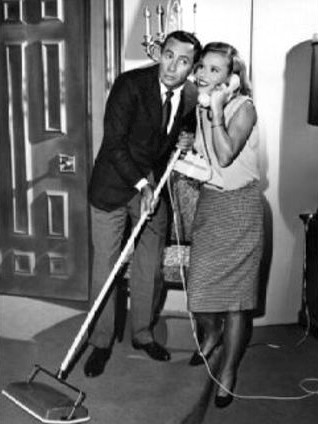
Joey Bishop and Abby Dalton

Storylines during the first season typically revolve around Joey's misadventures concerning his job and problems with his colorful family. As the series was a spin-off of The Danny Thomas Show, Danny Thomas and Marjorie Lord appeared as their Danny Thomas characters in the first season's fourth episode titled "This Is Your Life". Sid Melton, who appeared as Danny's boss Charley Halper on Danny Thomas, also appeared.

Upon its September 1961 premiere, the series struggled in the ratings. In an effort to improve viewership, NBC decided to "readjust" the series. After episode 13, several characters, including Joey's older sister Betty, brother-in-law Frank, Joey's potential love interest Barbara Simpson and Joey's boss Mr. Willoughby, were dropped. Several crew members were also dismissed.

In episode 16, "Home Sweet Home", Bill Bixby joined the cast on a recurring basis as Charles "Charlie" Raymond, Mr. Willoughby's nephew who takes over as president of the PR firm and becomes Joey's new boss. As of episode 20, Joey had a new girlfriend, Peggy Connolly, played by Jackie Russell, who would last through the end of the season. In episode 22, Joey gained a new assistant, Leonard Jillson, played by Joe Besser. The concept of the series was changed in the first season’s final two episodes, "A Show of His Own" and "The Image". Joey is “discovered” and gets his own network talk/variety show a la The Tonight Show. The changes helped to improve the ratings, and NBC renewed the series for a second season.

=== Seasons 2–4 ===
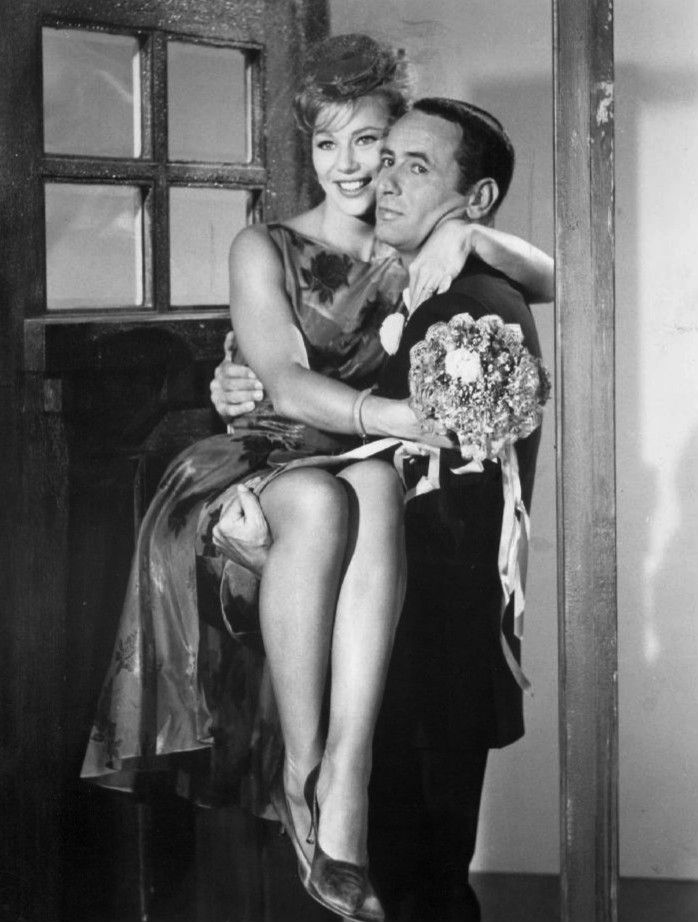
Abby Dalton prepares to be carried across the threshold as the new Mrs. Joey Barnes, September 15, 1962

In the second incarnation of The Joey Bishop Show, Joey Barnes is still the host of a New York City talk/variety television show. Every character other than Joey and Leonard Jillson was dropped from the show, and a new supporting cast was assembled. In addition to the format changing, The Joey Bishop Show began filming in front of a live studio audience.

Abby Dalton joined the cast as Joey's new wife Ellie (whom Joey called "Texas" because she hailed from Texas); the sudden marriage was announced in the first retooled episode. The two live at the Carlton Arms, a posh Manhattan apartment building. Their maid (and later nanny) named Hilda, portrayed by Mary Treen, serves as a foil for Joey.

Joe Besser portrayed Mr. Jillson, no longer Joey's assistant but now the building's goofy and henpecked superintendent. He lives in fear of his wife, Tantalia, who is never seen but often heard. Also joining the cast was Guy Marks, who portrayed Freddie, Joey's manager. Marks left the series after nineteen episodes and Corbett Monica joined the cast as Larry Corbett, Joey's head writer.

Storylines for the series' run mainly focus on Joey's home life, but also feature episodes involving Joey's job as a television host. As such, various celebrities (who typically appeared as themselves) who were guests on Joey Barnes' talk show appeared throughout the series' run. Although the second incarnation of the series was seemingly unrelated to the first incarnation, the series featured Danny Thomas in two season-three episodes: "Danny Gives Joey Advice" and "Andy Williams Visits Joey". Rusty Hamer, who appeared on Danny Thomas as Rusty Williams, also appeared as his character in three season-four episodes: "Rusty Arrives", "Rusty's Education", and "Joey Entertains Rusty's Fraternity".

Towards the end of season two, Ellie discovers she is pregnant with the couple's first child. Their son, Joey Barnes, Jr. (played by Dalton's real son Matthew David Smith), was born in the season-two finale "The Baby Cometh". The child, still played by Smith, is seen on a recurring basis thereafter.

In the show's fourth and final season, two recurring roles are added. Joey Forman plays Dr. Sam Nolan, Joey Jr.'s pediatrician who also lives in the same building as the Barnes family. Towards the end of the season, Allan Melvin appears in several episodes as Art Miller, a policeman who becomes a friend of the family. In the next-to-last episode, Ellie gives birth to the couple's second child, a girl (whose name is not revealed in the episode.) The baby is played by Kathleen Kinmont, Abby Dalton's real-life daughter.

== Cast ==
=== Main ===
- Joey Bishop as Joey Barnes

Season 1 only:

- Warren Berlinger as Larry Barnes (season 1)
- Madge Blake as Mrs. Barnes (season 1)
- Joe Flynn as Frank (season 1, to episode 11 only)
- John Griggs as J.P. Willoughby (season 1, to episode 13 only)
- Nancy Hadley as Barbara Simpson (season 1, to episode 13 only)
- Marlo Thomas as Stella Barnes (season 1)
- Virginia Vincent as Betty (season 1, to episode 11 only)
- Bill Bixby as Charles Raymond (season 1, episodes 16–29 only)
- Jackie Russell as Peggy Connolly (season 1, episodes 20–33 only)

Debuted in season 1:

- Joe Besser as Leonard Jillson (season 1, episode 22 - season 4)

Seasons 2-4 only:

- Abby Dalton as Ellie Barnes (seasons 2-4)
- Guy Marks as Freddie (season 2, episodes 1–19 only)
- Corbett Monica as Larry Corbett (season 2, episode 20 - season 4)
- Mary Treen as Hilda (seasons 2-4)
- Matthew David Smith as Joey Barnes, Jr. (seasons 2–4)
- Maxine Semon as the voice of Tantalia Jillson (season 2)
- Joey Forman as Dr. Sam Nolan (season 4)
- Allan Melvin as Al Miller (season 4)

=== Guest stars ===
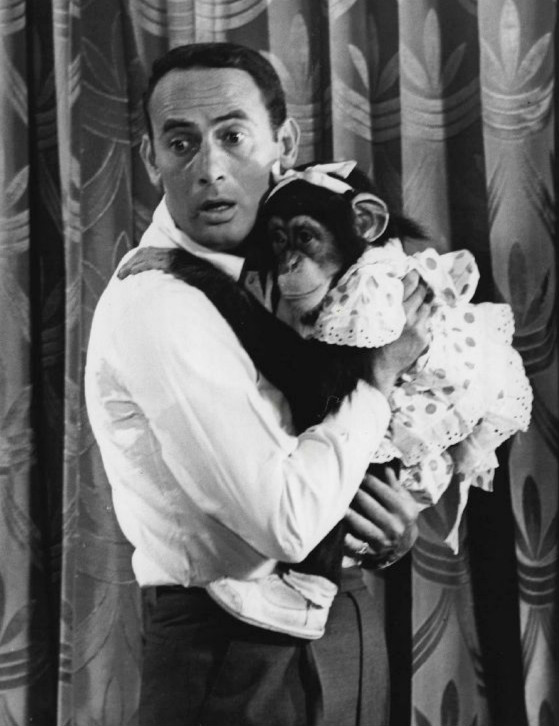
Joey Bishop and one of the Marquis Chimps

The Joey Bishop Show featured many celebrity guest stars who appeared as themselves. Among the celebrity guest stars are:

- The Andrews Sisters
- Edgar Bergen
- Milton Berle
- Jack Carter
- Vic Damone
- Tommy Davis
- Willie Davis
- Don Drysdale
- Zsa Zsa Gabor
- Shecky Greene
- Robert Goulet
- Buddy Hackett
- Frank Howard
- Jack Jones
- Don Knotts
- Jack E. Leonard
- Oscar Levant
- Jerry Lewis
- Claudine Longet
- Ed McMahon
- Jan Murray
- Jack Paar
- Bobby Rydell
- Roberta Sherwood
- Bill "Moose" Skowron
- Danny Thomas
- Andy Williams

Actors who appeared in guest starring roles include:

- Jack Albertson
- Merry Anders
- Cliff Arquette
- Parley Baer
- Raymond Bailey
- Neville Brand
- Frank Cady
- Jean Carson
- Jackie Coogan
- Ellen Corby
- Henry Gibson
- Rusty Hamer
- Sterling Holloway
- Nancy Kulp
- Sue Ane Langdon
- Joi Lansing
- George Lindsey
- Howard McNear
- Jaye P. Morgan
- Burt Mustin
- Maidie Norman
- Dennis O'Keefe
- Barbara Stanwyck
- George Tobias
- Lee Van Cleef
- Dawn Wells

== Episodes ==
Season	Episodes	Originally released		
Season	Episodes	First released	Last released	Network
1	32	September 20, 1961	May 9, 1962	NBC
2	34	September 15, 1962	May 11, 1963	NBC
3	31	September 14, 1963	April 25, 1964	NBC
4	26	September 29, 1964	March 30, 1965	CBS

=== Lost episode ===
One Season 3 episode of The Joey Bishop Show is now considered lost. The episode, known only as #85, was filmed on November 15, 1963 and guest starred comedian and impressionist Vaughn Meader. Meader rose to fame in the early 1960s for his comedic impersonation of then-President John F. Kennedy featured on the popular comedy album The First Family. The episode centered around Joey confusing Meader for the real President Kennedy and Meader performing other, non-Kennedy related routines from his musical/comedy stage act. A week after filming, President Kennedy was assassinated in Dallas. President Kennedy's death promptly ended Meader's career; his club bookings and television appearances were quickly canceled and his albums were pulled from stores. The episode featuring Meader was scheduled to air in February 1964, but was “scrapped”, or pulled from the schedule, by NBC. The episode never aired and was reportedly destroyed.

== Production ==
The series was created by Louis F. Edelman and Danny Thomas who also served as the executive producer. The series was produced by Thomas' company, Bellmar Enterprises. It was filmed at Desilu Studios in front of a live studio audience, with a laugh track added during post-production for "sweetening" purposes.

Upon its debut on NBC in 1961, The Joey Bishop Show was telecast in black-and-white during its first season except for five episodes which were filmed and broadcast in color to promote parent company RCA's color television sets on special "all color nights" which included episodes of Wagon Train. Those episodes were broadcast on October 4, 1961; November 1, 1961; December 6, 1961; February 7, 1962; and March 14, 1962. The series second and third seasons were fully broadcast in color. After the series moved to CBS for the 1964–65 season, it reverted to black-and-white.

== Reception and ratings ==
Upon its premiere, The Joey Bishop Show struggled in the ratings. After the first re-tooling, ratings for the series improved and NBC renewed it for a second season. The series' second revamped season proved to be popular with audiences and ratings increased. By the end of the third season, the series had dropped in the ratings again and NBC announced it would be dropped from its lineup in January 1964 (the series' third-season finale episode aired in May 1964). Around this time, Danny Thomas decided to end his series after eleven years despite its still high ratings. To compensate for Thomas' absence, CBS immediately picked up The Joey Bishop Show for the 1964–65 television season.

The Season 4 season opener, "Joey Goes to CBS", premiered on Sunday night September 27, 1964 at 9:30 P.M. opposite NBC's highly popular western series Bonanza. As a result, ratings for The Joey Bishop Show were low. By late fall 1964, ratings had not improved. In an effort to save the series, CBS moved it to Tuesday nights opposite the second half of ABC's Combat! and NBC's Mr. Novak. Ratings still remained low and CBS announced the series’ cancellation in January 1965. The series finale aired on March 30, 1965.

== Syndication and home media ==
Episodes of The Joey Bishop Show aired on TV Land in 1998.

In 2016, the series began airing on Retro TV.

Antenna TV announced in October 2016 it would begin airing the series the following January, including the rarely seen first season.

In September 2004, Questar Entertainment released the complete second season of The Joey Bishop Show on Region 1 DVD in the United States.

On March 13, 2018, SFM Entertainment (distributed by Allied Vaughn) released all four seasons plus a "Complete Series" set on DVD in Region 1 via Amazon.com's CreateSpace program. These are Manufacture-on-Demand (MOD) releases, available exclusively through Amazon.
