= Stan Dreben =

American screenwriter (1918–1980)

- Born: Stanley Edward Dreben; July 10, 1918; New York, U.S.
- Died: February 16, 1980 (aged 61); Northridge, California, U.S.
- Occupation: Screenwriter
- Years active: 1956–1980

Stanley Edward Dreben (July 10, 1918 – February 16, 1980) was an American screenwriter.

Dreben was born in New York. He began writing for the variety television series The Martha Raye Show in 1956. He then wrote episodes for television programs such as McHale's Navy, The Andy Griffith Show, Get Smart, The Paul Lynde Show, The Red Skelton Hour, The Danny Thomas Show, Green Acres, Love, American Style, The Flying Nun, Petticoat Junction, The Joey Bishop Show, F Troop, and The Facts of Life. Dreben also wrote for several episodes of The Tonight Show Starring Johnny Carson.

Dreben died in February 1980 at his home in Northridge, California, at the age of 61.
