= List of The Big Valley episodes =

The Big Valley is an American Western television series created by A.I. Bezzerides and Louis F. Edelman for ABC. The series is set on the fictional Barkley Ranch in Stockton, California, from 1884 to 1888. The one-hour episodes follow the lives of the Barkley family, one of the wealthiest and largest ranch-owning families in Stockton. It aired for four seasons, beginning on September 15, 1965, and ending on May 19, 1969, with a total of 112 episodes.

== Series overview ==
The series began with 1 hour episodes Wednesday nights, 9:00–10:00 on ABC. From Season 2 onward, it moved to Monday night, 10:00–11:00.

Season	Episodes	Originally released	
Season	Episodes	First released	Last released
1	30	September 15, 1965	April 27, 1966
2	30	September 12, 1966	April 24, 1967
3	26	September 11, 1967	March 18, 1968
4	26	September 23, 1968	May 19, 1969

== Episodes ==
=== Season 1 (1965–66) ===
No. overall	No. in season	Title	Directed by	Written by	Original release date
1	1	"Palms of Glory"	William Graham	Christopher Knopf	September 15, 1965
As the railroad brings in gunmen to force the ranchers and farmers off their land, the Barkley family leads the fight against the railroad, while a mysterious and angry young man arrives, claiming to be the son of the late Tom Barkley.
2	2	"Forty Rifles"	Bernard McEveety	Christopher Knopf	September 22, 1965
While adjusting to his new life with the Barkley family, Heath has a difficult time being accepted by the ranch hands. Upon being forced to lead them on a long cattle drive alone after Nick is shot, the man behind the shooting, Nick's old friend and now delusional former commanding officer, who is now looking to relive past glories, attempts to relieve Heath of his men with promises of a better and richer life.
3	3	"Boots with My Father's Name"	Joseph H. Lewis	Story by : Mel Goldberg & Les Pine & Tina Rome; Teleplay by : Mel Goldberg	September 29, 1965
A pair of boots belonging to the late Tom Barkley will only fit Heath, which proves awkward for him and stokes yet more resentment prior to an occasion to honor the late Barkley patriarch in Stockton. Victoria decides to investigate the relationship between Heath's birth mother and her late husband, despite what she discovers, and no matter the cost.
4	4	"The Young Marauders"	Paul Wendkos	Peter Packer	October 6, 1965
While out riding, Audra's life is saved by a young man who appears to be a knight in shining armor. She begins seeing the young man further, but he begins to arouse suspicion as a series of attacks and extortion attempts on neighboring ranchers begins taking place, just after he and his clan arrived in the valley.
5	5	"The Odyssey of Jubal Tanner"	Arnold Laven	Paul Savage	October 13, 1965
An old and close friend of Victoria and the late Tom Barkley arrives in the valley to claim land promised to him by them years prior, just as highly anticipated plans are being made by Jarrod, Nick, and the people of Stockton to construct a dam on the same land.
6	6	"Heritage"	Paul Wendkos	Carey Wilber	October 20, 1965
Heath investigates a series of violent acts in a mining town where the residents, living in poverty, have a deep-seated grudge against the owners of the mines, including the Barkleys.
7	7	"Winner Lose All"	Richard C. Sarafian	Harry Kronman	October 27, 1965
Heath falls for a beautiful young Spanish woman whose father disapproves of him on the basis of family purity of bloodlines and heritage, and threatens to destroy the neighboring ranchers if Heath continues seeing her.
8	8	"My Son, My Son"	Paul Henreid	Paul Schneider	November 3, 1965
As the family celebrates Audra's birthday, she encounters an unexpected guest - a childhood friend and son of friends of the Barkleys, now a young man who proves to be mentally unstable and attempts to sexually assault her.
9	9	"Earthquake!"	Paul Henreid	Oliver Crawford	November 10, 1965
As the Barkley family frantically searches for her following a large earthquake, Victoria is trapped underground with a pregnant Indian woman and a man whom Nick has recently fired, and who hates the Barkleys.
10	10	"The Murdered Party"	Virgil W. Vogel	Jack Curtis	November 17, 1965
Heath is a witness in a murder trial to a man whom Jarrod Barkley is compelled to defend no matter the cost.
11	11	"The Way to Kill a Killer"	Joseph M. Newman	Judith and Robert Guy Barrows	November 24, 1965
Cattle belonging to a friend of the Barkleys begin to perish due to a strange disease. Would they find a cure?
12	12	"Night of the Wolf"	Joseph H. Lewis	Margaret Armen	December 1, 1965
Bitten by a rabid wolf, Nick decides to go away and wait out the incubation period alone, to spare his family the grief.
13	13	"The Guilt of Matt Bentell"	Lewis Allen	Paul Savage	December 8, 1965
Heath becomes hostile to the Barkleys' new ranch foreman, whom he remembers as the commander of a Confederate prison camp.
14	14	"The Brawlers"	Joseph Pevney	William W. Norton	December 15, 1965
Nick clashes with the head of Irish immigrants who settled illegally on Barkley land, thinking they purchased it.
15	15	"Judgement in Heaven"	Murray Golden	Mel Goldberg	December 22, 1965
Hoping to reform an outlaw's girlfriend, Jarrod has her spend Christmas with the Barkleys.
16	16	"The Invaders"	Arnold Laven	Jay Simms	December 29, 1965
While out on the range investigating some dead cattle, Heath is ambushed by a gang of ruthless rawhiders, who first decide to bring him back to the Barkley ranch in anticipation of a large reward, but upon finding that the men of the ranch are all away on a cattle drive, they decide to plunder the place.
17	17	"By Fires Unseen"	Ralph Senensky	Ken Trevey	January 5, 1966
Nick returns home from a trip with a big surprise for the Barkley family - a fiancée. His bliss is short-lived however, as he soon learns his wife-to- be is not yet ready to settle down with one man.
18	18	"A Time to Kill"	Bernard McEveety	Peter Packer	January 19, 1966
William Shatner guest stars as Jarrod's old college buddy, who comes for a visit, trailed by a Secret Service agent who is convinced that he is a counterfeiter.
19	19	"Teacher of Outlaws"	Michael Ritchie	Lou Morheim	February 2, 1966
An outlaw kidnaps Victoria Barkley, believing her to be the town's schoolteacher, to teach him how to read and write.
20	20	"Under a Dark Star"	Michael Ritchie	Ken Trevey	February 9, 1966
A recently released ex-convict under the care and protection of Jarrod Barkley comes face to face with men who are out to make his life hell on the Barkley ranch, driving him to turn against the lawyer.
21	21	"Barbary Red"	Michael Ritchie	Judith Barrows	February 16, 1966
On his birthday, Nick Barkley and two ranch workers enter a saloon to celebrate, but things take a twist as Nick ends up bound to crew upon a vessel to be a slave. Jarrod Barkley senses that the head saloon girl (played by Jill St. John) is behind it, but fights his feelings for her.
22	22	"The Death Merchant"	Bernard McEveety	Jay Simms	February 23, 1966
When aging cowboy Handy Random, the man who killed the murderer of the late Tom Barkley, arrives at the Barkley ranch, the Barkleys are elated to see him - except for Heath, who knows the man for being far different from what the rest of the Barkleys think he is.
23	23	"The Fallen Hawk"	Paul Henreid	Ken Pettus	March 2, 1966
A mysterious friend of Heath's is injured in a bet due to money issues. Heath holds this hard feeling that he is responsible, and ends up assisting his wife at their home.
24	24	"Hazard"	Arnold Laven	Harry Kronman	March 9, 1966
A man arrives at the ranch looking for Heath, but is bushwhacked by two bounty hunters. Heath believes he should die, but Jarrod investigates the man, which leads him into a dangerous town whose residents have questionable motives.
25	25	"Into the Widow's Web"	Virgil W. Vogel	Story by : Ken Trevey; Teleplay by : Ken Trevey and Gerry Day	March 23, 1966
Heath meets an old girlfriend from his hometown of Strawberry, but ends up in jail when her husband is murdered under strange circumstances. Is he the killer or not? Jarrod Barkley investigates and ends up making a shocking discovery, but is opposed by a lawyer who is jealous of him.
26	26	"By Force and Violence"	Virgil W. Vogel	Peter Packer	March 30, 1966
When Victoria and Heath take a wagon full of supplies up to the Barkley lodge to prepare for the arrival of the rest of family, their pleasant ride soon turns into a nightmare when Heath is pinned under an overturned wagon.
27	27	"The River Monarch"	Sutton Roley	Story by : Carey Wilbur; Teleplay by : Carey Wilber and Mel Goldberg	April 6, 1966
A boy discovers the wreckage of a long-lost riverboat, the River Monarch. Victoria is appalled that persons accused her husband the late Tom Barkley of sinking the boat, which was said to be carrying a large shipment of gold. Nick Barkley encounters a mysterious woman in the meanwhile.
28	28	"The Midas Man"	Arnold Laven	Margaret Armen	April 13, 1966
Audra falls for a shrewd financier, who has come to the valley to capitalize on a drought that has left most of the ranchers in need of loans.
29	29	"Tunnel of Gold"	Virgil W. Vogel	Arthur Browne Jr.	April 20, 1966
Bert and Elaine Jason's new store is invaded by outlaws who tunnel into the next building, where a shipment of Barkley gold is to be stored.
30	30	"Last Train to the Fair"	Virgil W. Vogel	Paul Savage	April 27, 1966
The Barkleys are on their way by train to the fair in Sacramento, when Audra is stricken with a severe case of appendicitis. Fortunately, a doctor is on board, but unfortunately he is being chased by men who want to kill him.

=== Season 2 (1966–67) ===
No. overall	No. in season	Title	Directed by	Written by	Original release date
31	1	"Lost Treasure"	Arthur H. Nadel	Jack Curtis	September 12, 1966
A man arrives at the Barkley Ranch and claims that he is Heath's father. In the meanwhile, Heath questions his parentage.
32	2	"Legend of a General"	Virgil W. Vogel	Ken Pettus	September 19, 1966
33	3	"Legend of a General"	Virgil W. Vogel	Ken Pettus	September 26, 1966
Part 1: A ruthless dictator hunts for a general in Mexico, whom the Barkleys help escape his clutches -- but Mexican revolutionaries have jailed Heath, and are using his life to bargain for the general's return. Part 2: Heath is held prisoner in Mexico for his part in the general's escape in exchange for the general, who is conflicted whether to return to Mexico or not, as Heath's life is in the balance. Heath escapes from the jail, and is being hunted by the general's enemies.
34	4	"Caesar's Wife"	Virgil W. Vogel	Harry Kronman	October 3, 1966
A young man's stepmother vies for his affections, whereas Audra Barkley is accused of having feelings for him because he was her childhood sweetheart.
35	5	"Pursuit"	Virgil W. Vogel	Margaret Armen	October 10, 1966
Victoria Barkley goes after an Indian sick with a fatal disease, who is of a questionable character. Would they succeed in preventing him from spreading the disease to his tribe or risk disease themselves?
36	6	"The Martyr"	Virgil W. Vogel	Mel Goldberg	October 17, 1966
Jarrod Barkley defies bigotry and political extremism when he defends a Basque sheepherder who admits to being an anarchist -- but not a murderer -- in a town of prejudice and hate.
37	7	"Target"	Arthur H. Nadel	Mel Goldberg	October 31, 1966
Joshua Hawks, in company with a high-minded manager, sets out to cause misery and destroy the Barkleys no matter what it takes.
38	8	"The Velvet Trap"	Arthur H. Nadel	Don Ingalls	November 7, 1966
A mysterious woman seduces Nick Barkley into a strange situation to rid her of her jealous husband, who stalks her numerous times.
39	9	"The Man from Nowhere"	Joseph H. Lewis	Ken Pettus	November 14, 1966
While on his way as a middle man in a land dispute, an accident puts Jarrod Barkley into a state of amnesia.
40	10	"The Great Safe Robbery"	Virgil W. Vogel	William Norton	November 21, 1966
Three bumbling robbers hold up a railway station, while Victoria and Audra Barkley are about to embark on a trip. They target a tough safe.
41	11	"The Iron Box"	Bernard McEveety	Steven W. Carabatsos	November 28, 1966
Nick and Heath are swindled in a business transaction; accused of stealing, a corrupt sheriff sentences them to a prison under the command of a tyrannical commandant, where the prisoners are never released.
42	12	"Last Stage to Salt Flats"	Bernard McEveety	Arthur Browne Jr.	December 5, 1966
Victoria, Jarrod, Heath and their travelling companions are left stranded in the desert without water by three stagecoach robbers. A journey of survival ensues.
43	13	"A Day of Terror"	Virgil W. Vogel	Peter Packer	December 12, 1966
A ruthless matriarch and her outlaw sons turn the church into a prison for Victoria, Audra, and several Bible-class children.
44	14	"Hide the Children"	Arthur H. Nadel	Jack Curtis	December 19, 1966
Nick falsely accused a Gypsy vineyard worker of theft, and after injuring him in a fight, he reluctantly agrees to accompany the man's wife, daughter, and mother-in-law on a journey to the daughter's arranged marriage. Along the way, harassed by local townspeople, Nick finds himself mistaken for a Gypsy, and learns what it is like to be one of them. He also discovers some truths about Gypsies, the people who hate them simply because of prejudice, and his own bigotry.
45	15	"Day of the Comet"	Virgil W. Vogel	Gilbert Ralston	December 26, 1966
Audra Barkley takes a liking to a mysterious young man, who is a dreamer on the run due to reasons unknown.
46	16	"Wagonload of Dreams"	Virgil W. Vogel	A.I. Bezzerides	January 2, 1967
The Barkleys assist in business a man and his brother, who hopes for a bright future once he finally settles, only to be met by persons filled with malice and prejudice out to cause trouble for him.
47	17	"Image of Yesterday"	Virgil W. Vogel	Margaret Armen	January 9, 1967
Victoria meets an old beau, but her feelings towards him change when he and his band of gunslingers make their headquarters at the Barkley ranch while they combat bandits who are setting fires to places around Stockton.
48	18	"Boy Into Man"	Paul Henreid	A.I. Bezzerides	January 16, 1967
Heath, as well the rest of the Barkley family, seeks to help a troubled young man and his young siblings whose mother is absent.
49	19	"Down Shadow Street"	Virgil W. Vogel	Ken Trevey	January 23, 1967
Victoria is taken to an asylum to prevent her from testifying to a recent murder.
50	20	"The Stallion"	Paul Henreid	Gabrielle Upton	January 30, 1967
An elderly ranch hand on the Barkley ranch obsesses over the capture of a rare black stallion that nearly killed Nick; he thinks he is still youthful from his past, and tries to impress his daughter with the idea that he is still capable of such feats, while Heath tries to stop him and save his life.
51	21	"The Haunted Gun"	Bernard McEveety	Mel Goldberg	February 6, 1967
The Barkleys welcome an old friend who is now a Senator, Jud Robson, but the man has a strange case of paranoia, and is mentally disturbed by things from his past that may drive him to violence.
52	22	"Price of Victory"	Bernard McEveety	William Norton	February 13, 1967
A struggling boxer takes a rest from the profession at Nick's request, but he can't resist returning to the ring for one more bout, even though it may cost him his family -- and his life.
53	23	"Brother Love"	Virgil W. Vogel	Jay Simms	February 20, 1967
A fake faith healer comes to Stockton. He makes friends with Audra, but Heath is suspicious as to what the man's intentions truly are -- and Heath learns that the faith healer intends to fleece the people of the valley.
54	24	"Court Martial"	Virgil W. Vogel	Steven W. Carabatsos	March 6, 1967
A retired Civil War era Union general is tried for war crimes by ex-Confederates at the Barkley ranch while the family is held captive. Nick also becomes a victim of the kangaroo court.
55	25	"Plunder!"	Richard Long	William Blinn	March 13, 1967
A town is evacuated due to a weakened dam. Despite the danger, Heath is deputized to stop looters until the citizens can return.
56	26	"Turn of a Card"	Virgil W. Vogel	Story by : Lou Morheim; Teleplay by : Gilbert Ralston	March 20, 1967
A professional card player finds out that Heath is carrying $5,000 to a Barkley mine. The gambler even stoops to using a girl he "owns" in trying to strip Heath of the money.
57	27	"Showdown in Limbo"	Bernard McEveety	Story by : Ken Pettus & Philip Mishkin; Teleplay by : Ken Pettus	March 27, 1967
Heath stops in to visit an old friend and lawman, and upon learning his friend plans on transporting a notorious wanted outlaw to Stockton, with the outlaw's gang in hot pursuit and only his young and inexperienced son to help him, Heath decides he'll accompany them.
58	28	"The Lady from Mesa"	Joseph Mazzuca	Harry Kronman	April 3, 1967
A young woman comes to the Barkley Ranch to visit her sick father, a ranch hand who is a mysterious character -- and whom the woman blames for ruining her life.
59	29	"Days of Grace"	Virgil W. Vogel	William Fay	April 17, 1967
Heath is arrested and accused of rape of a rancher's daughter. Heath is at the mercy of lynch-minded townspeople -- until a nun breaks him out of jail.
60	30	"Cage of Eagles"	Virgil W. Vogel	Herb Meadow	April 24, 1967
An Irish political fugitive works as a dynamiter at a Barkley mine, but his presence infuriates a British engineer ... and leads to violence.

=== Season 3 (1967–68) ===
No. overall	No. in season	Title	Directed by	Written by	Original release date
61	1	"Joaquin"	Virgil W. Vogel	Ken Pettus	September 11, 1967
A Barkley ranch hand is murdered, shortly after the man had claimed a newly hired hand was actually an infamous Mexican outlaw.
62	2	"Ambush"	Virgil W. Vogel	Margaret Armen	September 18, 1967
Victoria revisits a desert mission. She fights to protect three Indian women from killers and only has a recently reformed alcoholic to help her.
63	3	"A Flock of Trouble"	Virgil W. Vogel	Michael Gleason	September 25, 1967
Nick is tricked into accepting a flock of sheep for payment of a poker debt, and he does not like it any more than the rest of the neighboring cattlemen; when the cattlemen begin insulting, taunting, and threatening him, Nick decides he will get rid of the sheep when he is good and ready to.
64	4	"Time After Midnight"	Charles S. Dubin	Steven W. Carabatsos	October 2, 1967
Jarrod agrees to prosecute a land grabber, but his determination to see justice is severely tested when he is blinded in an explosion.
65	5	"Night in a Small Town"	Virgil W. Vogel	Don Ingalls	October 9, 1967
Traveling on a stage, Heath, Victoria, Audra, and a wayward saloon girl, stop in a small town for the night, where the town marshal turns out to be an old friend of Heath's. The man, though, is clearly not the man Heath remembers.
66	6	"Ladykiller"	Norman S. Powell	Jay Simms	October 16, 1967
On their way home from a cattle-buying trip, Nick and Heath stop at a family-run inn for the night, where Nick immediately falls for the attractive young woman serving them, completely unaware that she and the rest of her family plan on adding him to the long list of guests they have robbed and murdered. (Loosely based on The Bloody Benders)
67	7	"Guilty"	Paul Henreid	Harry Kronman	October 30, 1967
A recently convicted murderer escapes and returns to town. While he is cornered in the schoolhouse, Jarrod tries to help the man prove his innocence.
68	8	"The Disappearance"	Virgil W. Vogel	Story by : Lou Morheim; Teleplay by : Michael Gleason	November 6, 1967
A frantic Victoria searches for an ill Audra, who disappeared from a hotel and whom no one claims to have seen.
69	9	"A Noose is Waiting"	Joseph Mazzuca	Arthur Browne Jr.	November 13, 1967
The Barkleys become acquainted with the new town doctor, unaware that he is a psychotic killer out to avenge his father's suicide by hanging those he holds responsible, and Victoria is one of his targets.
70	10	"Explosion!"	Virgil W. Vogel	John O'Dea & Arthur Rowe	November 20, 1967
71	11	"Explosion!"	Virgil W. Vogel	John O'Dea & Arthur Rowe	November 27, 1967
Part 1: A forest fire rages, drawing closer to Stockton. The only solution is a firebreak made with nitroglycerin! Part 2: A forest fire rages drawing closer to Stockton. The only solution, a firebreak made with nitroglycerin! The Barkley brothers volunteer to take the nitroglycerin to the fire!
72	12	"Four Days to Furnace Hill"	Virgil W. Vogel	Ken Pettus	December 4, 1967
Victoria is captured by crooked prison guards, who plan to substitute her for a female convict whom they accidentally killed, whilst conveying her to a mysterious prison named Furnace Hill.
73	13	"Night of the Executioner"	Virgil W. Vogel	Mel Goldberg	December 11, 1967
Heath whilst on a journey on business lodges in a town, where an old drunkard is pulled in a conspiracy to murder a Congressman under mysterious circumstances. The killer was inside the town jail whilst the murder was committed. Heath attempts to solve the mystery and the motives behind the murder as he encounters a 'Big Boss' man and a corrupt Sheriff who blames the drunkard for the murder. Heath looks to clear his name.
74	14	"Journey into Violence"	Arnold Laven	Arthur Browne Jr.	December 18, 1967
A community of mountain dwellers, who live by their own laws, captures Heath and forces him into slavery, accused of deliberately murdering of one of their own. Heath must serve the victim's widow who seems to be sorely grieved.
75	15	"The Buffalo Man"	Joseph Mazzuca	Margaret Armen	December 25, 1967
The Barkleys hire convicts to help with their crops as part of a parole system, but a sadistic guard is determined to make his charges miserable.
76	16	"The Good Thieves"	Joseph Mazzuca	Dan Ullman	January 1, 1968
On the trail of the two thieving brothers who shot Jarrod during a robbery, Nick and Heath find them in a town where they are not only considered the leading citizens, but also practically saints.
77	17	"Days of Wrath"	Virgil W. Vogel	Ken Pettus	January 8, 1968
Wracked with grief when his bride is murdered, an enraged Jarrod relentlessly hunts down her killer. He goes to the length of another side of justice despite the consequences of his actions and despite his family's intervention in the issue.
78	18	"Miranda"	Paul Henreid	Ken Pettus	January 15, 1968
A wealthy Mexican visits the Barkleys and brings a valuable necklace. A female rebel comes to the ranch, planning to steal the necklace and bring it back to Mexico to help fund a revolution.
79	19	"Shadow of a Giant"	Norman S. Powell	Sasha Gilien & Mel Goldberg	January 29, 1968
Heath and Nick join a posse led by a legendary marshal to recapture an escaped convict who had been busted out of jail, and his friends. Heath has suspicions of the marshal, recognizing him from the past where he witnessed the man's recklessness, which endangered the lives of all of his deputies as he was in his posse out on a similar mission. Heath and Nick work to bring the convict to justice and to ensure the survival of the posse.
80	20	"Fall of a Hero"	Virgil W. Vogel	David Moessinger	February 5, 1968
Heath is on trial for murder, but he cannot remember what happened. Heath seeks, with Jarrod's help, to find the truth. An old attorney friend of Jarrod's arrives in town on a visit. Will Heath be able to avoid the hangman's noose and his name be cleared in Court?
81	21	"The Emperor of Rice"	Virgil W. Vogel	Mel Goldberg	February 12, 1968
An old Barkley friend becomes desperate to corner the rice market. Victoria is kidnapped as part of the plan to force the family to help.
82	22	"Rimfire"	Charles S. Dubin	Margaret Armen	February 19, 1968
Jarrod travels to complete a merger deal between another mining company and the Barkley mines, but problems arise when mineowners get in the way.
83	23	"Bounty on a Barkley"	Arnold Laven	John O'Dea & Jay Simms	February 26, 1968
Nick falls in love with an attractive but sly new woman in town, who slowly warms to his attentions, but she forgets to mention that she is already married.
84	24	"The Devil's Masquerade"	Paul Henreid	Sasha Gilien & Mel Goldberg	March 4, 1968
Heath's friend, a nearby rancher, sends for a mail order bride. Upon her arrival, some things about her background seem strange and arouses Heath to question her identity. Heath investigates her and comes across a surprising discovery.
85	25	"Run of the Savage"	Virgil W. Vogel	Don Ingalls	March 11, 1968
A series of relatively petty thefts lead Nick to an embittered youth who he attempts to befriend. The stakes are raised when Nick finds himself held for ransom while tied up in a cave that is in danger of collapsing.
86	26	"The Challenge"	Virgil W. Vogel	Margaret Armen	March 18, 1968
A Senator comes to Stockton to campaign for re-election, but finds himself the target of a smear campaign that pulls Victoria in, as well. Regis Philbin Guest stars.

=== Season 4 (1968–69) ===
No. overall	No. in season	Title	Directed by	Written by	Original release date
87	1	"In Silent Battle"	Charles S. Dubin	Lee Erwin	September 23, 1968
Victoria and Audra Barkley unexpectedly meets a commanding officer in the US Army who rescued them from a freak accident on the road. He takes an immediate liking to Audra, but unknown to them, he is psychologically disturbed and is obsessed with purity within women and adultery. Is he a man or a monster?
88	2	"They Called Her Delilah"	Virgil W. Vogel	Story by : Lou Morheim; Teleplay by : Ken Pettus	September 30, 1968
A mysterious woman arrives at Stockton, only to be the center of hate, prejudice, and ill will in the town. Jarrod Barkley is conflicted despite his feelings for her, as he had met her in the past. Jarrod begins questioning her actions in the Civil War.
89	3	"Presumed Dead"	Virgil W. Vogel	Margaret Armen	October 7, 1968
On a stagecoach ride to Stockton, Victoria Barkley meets with an accident on the road, which takes a rough, unexpected turn when she becomes amnesiac. She meets a widower of a questionable character, who believes that she is his 'deceased' wife, who takes care, concern and immediate attraction to her. Will she remember her old life or not?
90	4	"Run of the Cat"	Bernard McEveety	Edward J. Lakso	October 21, 1968
Nick Barkley encounters a wild puma and has a near-death experience. He joins a man hired by the Barkleys to hunt the cat, much to his protests, fearing his safety and survival. Nick risks his life to eagerly join the hunter who is reluctant to take him on the mission.
91	5	"Deathtown"	Don Taylor	Edward J. Lasko	October 28, 1968
Jarrod Barkley travels to a strange town, intent on meeting three brothers for a business deal. Upon arrival, he hears that they have all been lynched, for reasons unknown. Jarrod becomes involved in a mystery where he encounters citizens of questionable character -- and hostility as well.
92	6	"The Jonah"	Virgil W. Vogel	Ed Adamson	November 11, 1968
The Barkleys meet a short, timid man, who is believed to be a jinx, as whatever he sets his hands to becomes a disaster. The Ranch hands wants to be socially distant from him protesting to the Barkleys.
93	7	"Hell Hath No Fury"	Virgil W. Vogel	Sasha Gilien and Mel Goldberg	November 18, 1968
Heath has an interesting encounter with a young woman who has become obsessed with him and plans to marry him, much to the objections of her wayward brothers. As Heath wrestles with her feelings for him (which are not entirely reciprocated), he discovers that things may not be what they seem.
94	8	"The Long Ride"	Virgil W. Vogel	Fred Freiberger	November 25, 1968
Audra Barkley witnesses the brutal murder of a close friend and her family, which has placed Audra in shock and has rendered her mute. Victoria Barkley takes her home to Stockton by stagecoach when the stage and its passengers are pursued by mysterious riders, who try to disrupt their journey by overturning wells and burning shelters determined to silence Audra. Victoria protects and fights for her daughter amidst the negativity from the outside and the inside. Will Audra speak or not?
95	9	"The Profit and the Lost"	Bernard McEveety	Richard Wendley	December 2, 1968
Heath saves the life of a man who turns out to be a hired killer on his way to Stockton to accept a job - killing Heath.
96	10	"A Stranger Everywhere"	Paul Henreid	Lee Erwin	December 9, 1968
A woman who is a seamstress is believed by Nick and his friends to be a legendary outlaw. Comedy ensues, but matters take a serious turn as her life is placed in danger from men who are determined to end her life.
97	11	"The Prize"	Virgil W. Vogel	D. C. Fontana	December 16, 1968
Heath takes in his care and protection a baby entrusted to him by an outlaw's dying wife.
98	12	"Hunter's Moon"	Bernard McEveety	Don Ingalls	December 30, 1968
A jealous rancher holds Nick Barkley and two men captive, believing one of them to be his wife's outside lover. Nick escapes but discovers her secret, much to the shock of the rancher.
99	13	"Top of the Stairs"	Virgil W. Vogel	Ken Pettus	January 6, 1969
In the town of Abbottsville, Victoria encounters a sinister mystery when she is kept away from her brother-in-law, who has been judged insane by mysterious persons.
100	14	"Joshua Watson"	Virgil W. Vogel	Robert L. Goodwin	January 20, 1969
An African-American cowboy is believed to be a legendary and special man with the ability to tame horses with ease. Silas, the Barkleys' householder, questions his intentions and his existence -- and so do the Barkleys' rivals, the unscrupulous Morton family.
101	15	"The Secret"	Joseph Mazzuca	Sasha Gilien & Mel Goldberg	January 27, 1969
A wealthy rancher sets out to ruin the Barkleys. His motive: intense hatred of Jarrod, whom he believes is having an affair with his young wife while he is absent on business.
102	16	"The 25 Graves of Midas"	Richard Long	Ken Pettus	February 3, 1969
Heath, on his way to a mining town called Midas, is injured by a man who befriends him; the man turned out to be a robber. Heath is believed by the residents of the town to be a payroll robber; the residents have a grudge against the Barkleys and their partner Dutton in the town's mining company.
103	17	"Lightfoot"	Lawrence Dobkin	Story by : John O'Dea and Jay Simms; Teleplay by : Ken Pettus and John O'Dea & Jay Simms	February 17, 1969
Despite being college-educated, a Modoc Indian is given to angry outbursts as he imagines prejudice from any action of white people. With the whole town against the tribesman, Jarrod acts as his lawyer when he is accused of murdering a white man who had heckled him.
104	18	"Alias Nellie Handley"	Virgil W. Vogel	Margaret Armen	February 24, 1969
Victoria Barkley poses as a thief and goes undercover at a women's prison to investigate the conditions there.
105	19	"Royal Road"	Virgil W. Vogel	Ken Pettus	March 3, 1969
A young woman has a strange friendship with a young man believed to be an Indian prince, who has for his mentor a man of a questionable character. Jarrod tries to warn her.
106	20	"A Passage of Saints"	Nicholas Webster	John Dunkel	March 10, 1969
The Barkleys unknowingly rent a farm to a stubborn Mormon polygamist (he has two wives). Jarrod acts as arbiter when bigots harass the farmer.
107	21	"The Battle of Mineral Springs"	Virgil W. Vogel	Douglas Moore	March 24, 1969
Victoria and Jarrod stop in a town having outrageous prices for food, lodging, and services. After finding out the people are bilking travelers to survive, the Barkleys decide to open a shipping business to save the town.
108	22	"The Other Face of Justice"	Virgil W. Vogel	Don Ingalls	March 31, 1969
Nick and Heath, on the trail of a gang of murderous raiders stealing horses, enlist the help of the ex-sheriff of Stockton. The motivation behind his "help", however, is totally unexpected by the Barkleys.
109	23	"Town of No Exit"	Norman S. Powell	William Norton	April 7, 1969
In a dying desert town, Heath is imprisoned by five deranged people who play bizarre and deadly games with the few people who happen onto their town.
110	24	"Danger Road"	Virgil W. Vogel	D. C. Fontana	April 21, 1969
An Englishman with a large gambling debt agrees to smuggle whiskey onto an Indian reservation to pay off his losses. As he travels to his destination, he meets Victoria, who is on her way to the reservation with medical supplies, and they find the road there is full of unexpected danger.
111	25	"Flight from San Miguel"	Lawrence Dobkin	Edward J. Lasko	April 28, 1969
A former girlfriend asks Heath to undertakes a dangerous trip to revolution-torn Mexico to save her rebel Mexican husband out of Mexico, before the federales find and kill him.
112	26	"Point and Counterpoint"	James F. Lichtman	Arthur Browne Jr.	May 19, 1969
A dying prisoner asks his son to kill the two people whose testimony caused his death: a Stockton banker named Clark -- and Victoria Barkley. After Clark is murdered, Jarrod, unaware that Victoria is the next target, agrees to act as the son's lawyer when he is put on trial for murder.
