= The Big Valley =

American Western television series (1965–1969)

- Genre: Western
- Created by: A. I. Bezzerides; Louis F. Edelman
- Starring: Richard Long; Peter Breck; Lee Majors; Linda Evans; Barbara Stanwyck
- Composer: George Duning
- Country of origin: United States
- Original language: English
- No. of seasons: 4
- No. of episodes: 112 (list of episodes)

Production
- Running time: 50 minutes
- Production companies: Levy-Gardner-Laven Productions; Four Star Television; Margate

Original release
- Network: ABC
- Release: September 15, 1965 – May 19, 1969

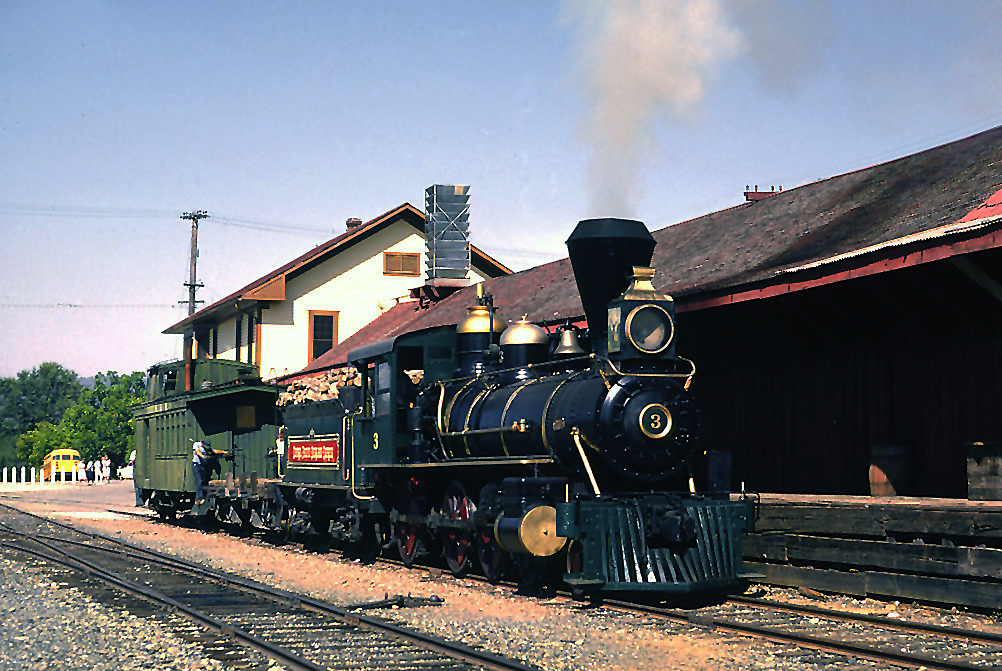
Sierra Railway Engine #3 at the old Jamestown, California Depot, for the filming of the pilot episode of The Big Valley, 1965

The Big Valley is an American Western television series that originally aired from September 15, 1965, to May 19, 1969, on ABC. The series is set on the fictional Barkley Ranch near Stockton, California. The one-hour episodes follow the lives of the Barkley family, one of the wealthiest and largest ranch-owning families in Stockton, led by matriarch Victoria Barkley (Barbara Stanwyck), her sons Jarrod (Richard Long) and Nick (Peter Breck), daughter Audra (Linda Evans), and their half-brother Heath (Lee Majors). The series was created by A. I. Bezzerides and Louis F. Edelman and produced by Levy-Gardner-Laven for Four Star Television.

== Plot synopsis ==
The series begins about 6 years after the death of the family patriarch, Thomas Barkley. Although he is never shown in the series (other than a painting and a statue), the character of Thomas Barkley is referred to as a major plot point many times. The character of Heath Barkley is introduced in episode one as the illegitimate son of Tom Barkley. His presence and claim to the Barkley name is the focus of many of the dramatic plots in season one.

== Cast and characters ==
=== Main ===
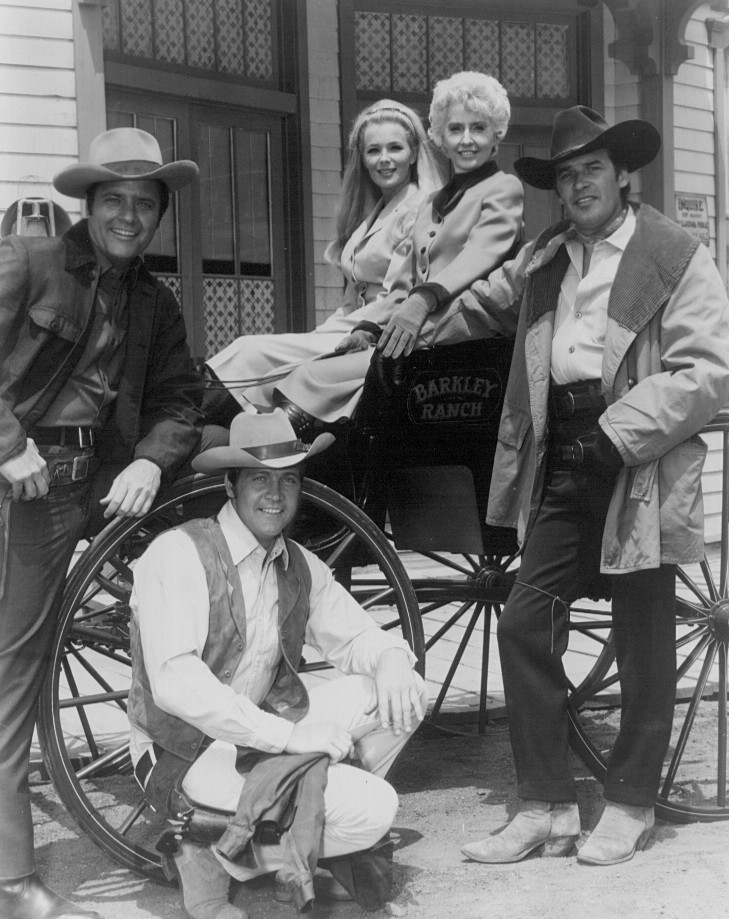
The Big Valley main cast. Left to right: Long, Majors, Evans, Stanwyck, and Breck

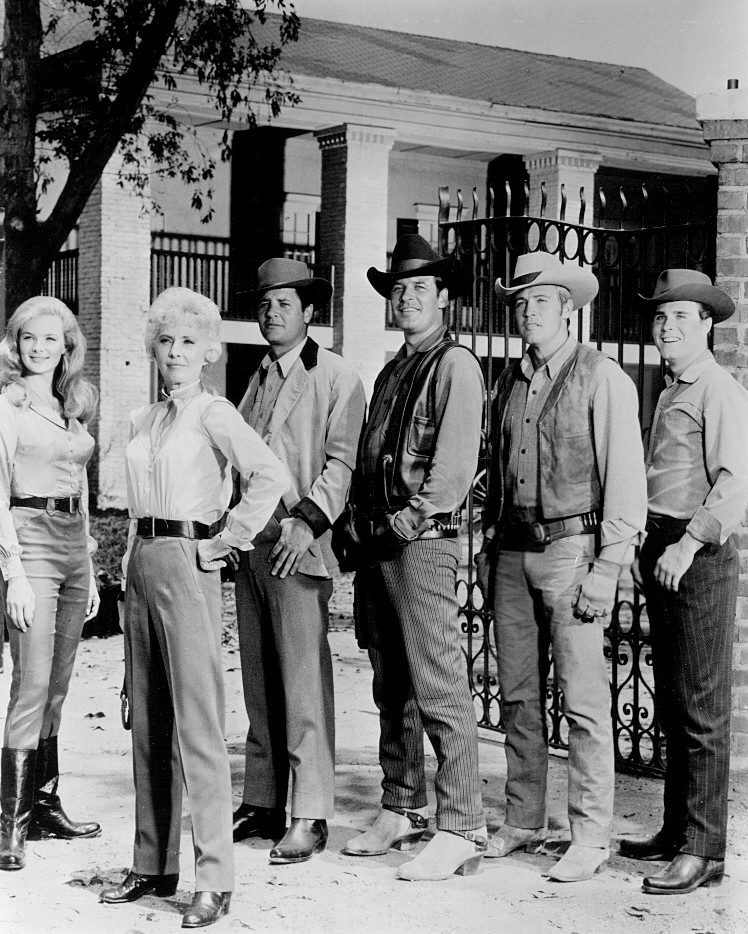
L-R: Linda Evans, Barbara Stanwyck, Richard Long, Peter Breck, Lee Majors, and Charles Briles (1965)

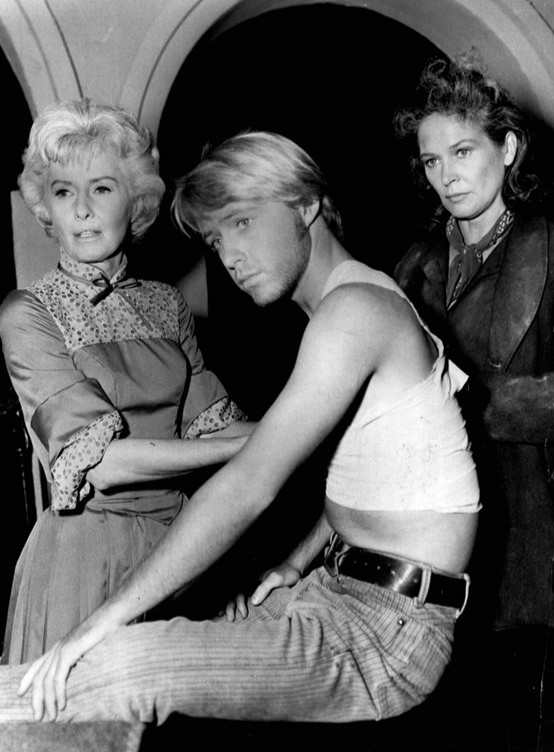
Barbara Stanwyck, Michael Burns and Colleen Dewhurst in episode "A Day of Terror" (1966)

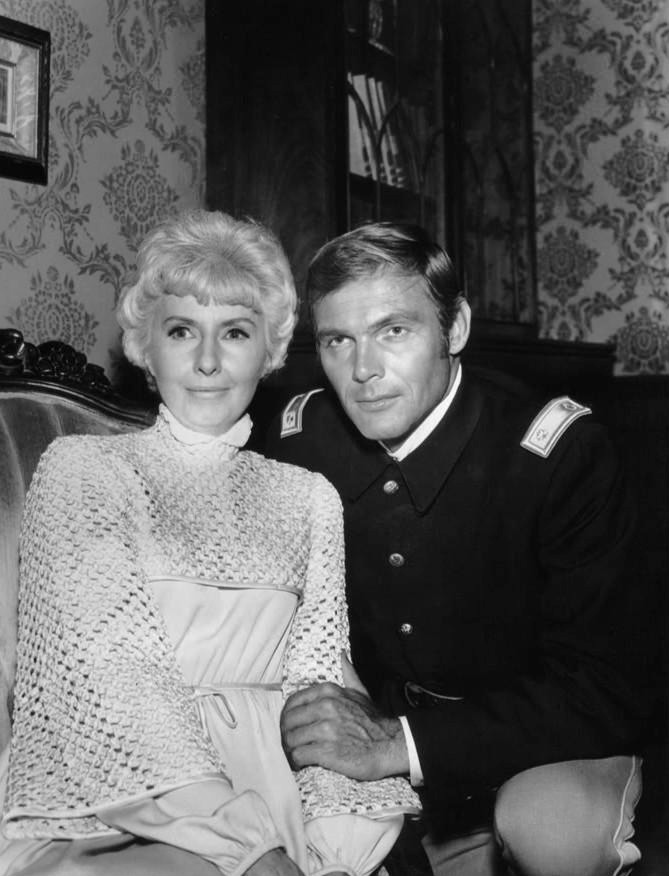
Episode "In Silent Battle", Barbara Stanwyck and Adam West (1968)

- Victoria Barkley, portrayed by Barbara Stanwyck, the widow of Thomas Barkley, is the head of the wealthy, influential Barkley family, who live in 19th-century Stockton in California's Central Valley. She is the main character of the series. Victoria Barkley is the owner and head of the Barkley ranch. In fact, Stanwyck's refusal to portray Barkley as fragile was controversial at the time. Barkley's husband Tom had been killed 6 years before the beginning of the series. Victoria Barkley loves and is proud of all her children, including her late husband's illegitimate son Heath, to whom she would refer as "my son". Stanwyck, who went from the refined, elegant lady of the manor to a jean-clad cowgirl as tough as any cowboy, appeared the most, in 103 of the 112 episodes. Her episodes were often surprisingly hard-hitting, seeing her character either locked away in a lunatic asylum to prevent her testifying as eyewitness at a murder trial ("Down Shadow Street"), taken prisoner in a prison wagon to replace a dead female convict ("Four Days to Furnace Hill"), impersonating a thief to go undercover at a women's prison to report on conditions there ("Alias Nellie Handley"), or trapped underground following a cave-in ("Earthquake").
- Jarrod Thomas Barkley, the eldest son, is a respected attorney-at-law. Richard Long plays the role of the educated, refined, and calmest of the Barkley sons, who handles all of the family's legal and business affairs. While Jarrod, a skilled lawyer, prefers the law to settle disputes, he is known to resort to frontier justice and violence when necessary. He is briefly married in one episode ("Days of Wrath"), only to see his new wife murdered with a bullet intended for him. An enraged Jarrod loses his calm and genteel manners, then relentlessly tracks down the killer. He is in the midst of killing him with his bare hands before he is stopped by Nick and Heath. Jarrod is a veteran of the American Civil War. He served as a cavalry officer in the Union Army. He commanded a cavalry troop of black soldiers as referenced in the episode "The Buffalo Man". Long appeared in 98 of the 112 episodes.
- Nicholas "Nick" Jonathan Barkley, the hot-tempered younger son, is portrayed by Peter Breck. Nick manages the family ranch. He wears a black leather jacket or vest, large black hat, and black leather gloves, and is distinguished by his brawling ways and loud demeanor. Nick had served as a soldier in combat in the Union Army during the Civil War as referenced in the episode "Forty Rifles". He is always ready for a fight, and at times would fight with his brothers as well. Underneath his gruff exterior, he is fun-loving, has a great sense of humor, is warm and caring, and loves his family deeply. Breck appears in 98 of the 112 episodes.
- Audra Barkley, played by Linda Evans, is Victoria's only daughter. Audra is somewhat self-absorbed, bold, and forward. Far from demure, she performs daring stunts and rides astride, like her brothers. Like Nick and Jarrod, Audra is initially leery of Heath's story that he is their father's son. Early, she attempts to seduce Heath, so as to expose him as a fraud, but is unsuccessful. As the series progresses, Audra and Heath form a very close brother-and-sister bond. Audra also has a caring side, as seen by her tending to children at the local orphanage. A few episodes deal with her romances, and one notable episode was "My Son, My Son" in which Robert Walker, Jr., guests as a suitor who proves to be mentally unstable. During the series' final two seasons, Evans' appearances were reduced because she wanted to spend more time with her husband John Derek. Evans appeared the least, in 82 of the 112 episodes.
- Heath Barkley is the illegitimate son of Victoria's late husband, and he has to literally fight his way into the Barkley home. Lee Majors portrays the even-tempered but rough-and-tumble Heath, who is often angry and aggressive throughout the early episodes due to his belief that Tom Barkley has abandoned his real mother after she became pregnant, as well as the resistance he initially receives from some of his siblings. In truth, Tom Barkley never knew about Heath, as Heath's mother has never told him, and never told Heath until she was on her deathbed (as revealed in the third episode of season one, "Boots with My Father's Name".) Heath gradually gains acceptance from the rest of the Barkley clan as the first season progressed, until he becomes as much a "Barkley" as the rest of the family, and his love for them becomes equal. Heath comes to call Victoria "Mother" when speaking to her directly and about her with his siblings. In the episode "Boots with My Father's Name", Heath tells Victoria, "you know that there isn't anything that I wouldn't do for you," indicating how deeply he cares for Victoria. Although Nick is initially leery of Heath and feels he has to test Heath's mettle, Heath proves himself worthy of Nick's acceptance, and eventually Nick seems to grow even closer to Heath than he is to Jarrod, perhaps in a sense due to Heath having more in common with him than Jarrod does. In "The Lost Treasure", the series' season-two premiere, one of a few episodes taken out of the show's initial syndication runs, Heath meets Charlie Sawyer (comic Buddy Hackett in a rare dramatic turn), a con man who claimed to be his actual father (the final moments show him admitting he wasn't Heath's father, but has been married to Heath's mother briefly before running out on her). In the same episode, Beah Richards returns as Hannah, the black quasinanny who helped raise Heath with his mother. Heath is a veteran of the Civil War as referenced in the episode "The Guilt of Matt Bentell". He served as a soldier in the Union Army in combat operations in New Mexico, and was held as a prisoner of war for 7 months by Confederate forces. Heath is also established in the episode "The Death Merchant" as having been involved in the Lincoln County War (1878), where he came to know the hired killer "Handy" (played by James Whitmore), who had tracked down and killed Tom Barkley's murderer, but who is known by Heath as a merciless killer who changes sides - or played both sides - whenever the money was good. Majors appeared in 97 of the 112 episodes.

In addition to the Barkley family members, the episode plots typically revolve around morally conflicted protagonists and antagonists, a common theme in the mythology of the American West in the 19th century.

=== Recurring ===
- Silas (Napoleon Whiting), the Barkley's majordomo, appears 35 times. In several episodes his character shows the trauma of slavery ("Joshua Watson"), life for blacks after the Civil War ("The Buffalo Man"), and meaning in his own work for the family ("Miranda").
- Sheriff Fred Madden (Douglas Kennedy) appears in 20 episodes.
- Eugene Barkley (Charles Briles), the youngest Barkley son and a medical student studying at Berkeley. Like his older brothers, he is known to have a temper as seen in the season-one episode "Boots with My Father's Name". He appears in eight first-season episodes. Then, Briles is drafted. Eugene's name is only mentioned once again.

=== Guest stars ===
The Big Valley was well known for its many guest stars, including:

- Julie Adams
- Claude Akins
- Jack Albertson
- Chris Alcaide
- Marty Allen
- John Anderson
- Richard Anderson
- E.J. André
- Tige Andrews
- R. G. Armstrong
- Lew Ayres
- Diane Baker
- Joe Don Baker
- Ed Bakey
- Rayford Barnes
- Anne Baxter
- Fred Beir
- Milton Berle
- Karen Black
- Antoinette Bower
- Hank Brandt
- Charles Bronson
- Brooke Bundy
- Walter Burke
- Michael Burns
- Ellen Burstyn
- Archie Butler
- Robert Cabal
- Joseph Campanella
- Antony Carbone
- Judy Carne
- John Carradine
- Robert Carricart
- Conlan Carter
- John Carter
- Christopher Cary
- Albert Cavens
- Spencer Chan
- Al Checco
- John Cliff
- Sidney Clute
- Richard Collier
- Bill Coontz
- Jeanne Cooper
- Kelly Corcoran
- Noreen Corcoran
- Walter Coy
- Yvonne Craig
- Norma Crane
- Johnny Crawford
- Dennis Cross
- Royal Dano
- Clifford David
- Quentin Dean
- John Dehner
- Bruce Dern
- Colleen Dewhurst
- Bradford Dillman
- Ken Drake
- Richard Dreyfuss
- Don Dubbins
- Andrew Duggan
- Donald Elson
- Maurice Evans
- Richard Farnsworth
- Duke Fishman
- Paul Fix
- Robert Fuller
- Vincent Gardenia
- Sean Garrison
- Kathy Garver
- Ted Gehring
- Sam Gilman
- Arlene Golonka
- Harold Gould
- Robert Goulet
- Lee Grant
- Dabbs Greer
- James Gregory
- Charles Grodin
- Herman Hack
- Buddy Hackett
- Kevin Hagen
- Chick Hannan
- Arthur Hanson
- Julie Harris
- Peter Haskell
- Chuck Hicks
- Joe Higgins
- Rex Holman
- Dennis Hopper
- Ron Howard
- Clyde Howdy
- Clegg Hoyt
- Steve Ihnat
- Anthony James
- Russell Johnson
- I. Stanford Jolley
- Henry Jones
- L. Q. Jones
- Robert Karnes
- George Kennedy
- Sajid Khan
- Yaphet Kotto
- Diane Ladd
- Martin Landau
- Cloris Leachman
- Norman Leavitt
- Robert Loggia
- Julie London
- Lynn Loring
- Tom Lowell
- Barbara Luna
- Ken Lynch
- Carol Lynley
- Gavin MacLeod
- Mako
- Flip Mark
- Nora Marlowe
- Frank Marth
- Strother Martin
- Marlyn Mason
- Ken Mayer
- Rod McGaughy
- Frank McGrath
- John Milford
- Read Morgan
- Leslie Nielsen
- Jimmy Noel
- Kathleen Nolan
- Sheree North
- Arthur O'Connell
- Dan O'Herlihy
- J. Pat O'Malley
- Simon Oakland
- Warren Oates
- Susan Oliver
- Nancy Olson
- Gregg Palmer
- Leslie Parrish
- Nehemiah Persoff
- Paul Petersen
- Regis Philbin
- John M. Pickard
- Eve Plumb
- Joe Ploski
- Sherwood Price
- Chips Rafferty
- Ford Rainey
- Lou Rawls
- Sam Reese
- Beah Richards
- Pernell Roberts
- Wayne Rogers
- Katharine Ross
- Bing Russell
- Gene Rutherford
- Jill St. John
- Albert Salmi
- Robert Sampson
- Cosmo Sardo
- Frank J. Scannell
- Anne Seymour
- William Shatner
- David Sheiner
- Milan Smith
- Olan Soule
- Harry Dean Stanton
- Warren Stevens
- Harold J. Stone
- Susan Strasberg
- Karl Swenson
- Dub Taylor
- Kelly Thordsen
- Malachi Throne
- Paul Trinka
- Jack Tornek
- Harry Townes
- Charles Wagenheim
- Robert Walker Jr.
- Fritz Weaver
- Adam West
- James Whitmore
- Van Williams
- Morgan Woodward
- Anthony Zerbe

== Episodes ==
The series began with 1 hour episodes Wednesday nights, 9:00–10:00 on ABC. From Season 2 onward, it moved to Monday night, 10:00–11:00.

Season	Episodes	Originally released	
Season	Episodes	First released	Last released
1	30	September 15, 1965	April 27, 1966
2	30	September 12, 1966	April 24, 1967
3	26	September 11, 1967	March 18, 1968
4	26	September 23, 1968	May 19, 1969

== Background and production ==
=== Background ===
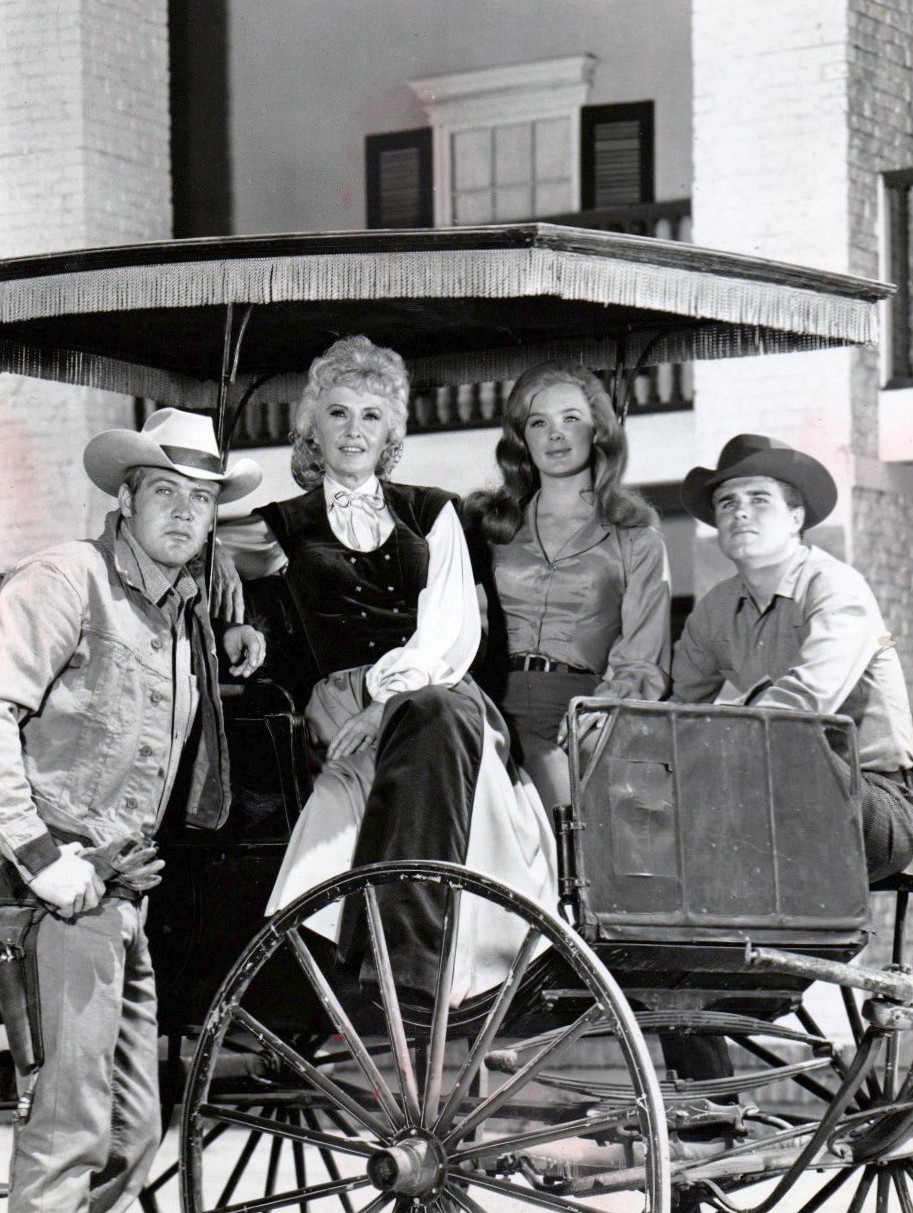
Lee Majors (Heath Barkley), Barbara Stanwyck (Victoria Barkley), Linda Evans (Audra Barkley) and Charles Briles (Eugene Barkley, the youngest son). Briles' character appeared only eight times in the first season and then was written out.

The TV series was based loosely on the Hill Ranch, which was located at the western edge of Calaveras County, not far from Stockton. The Hill Ranch existed from 1855 until 1931 and included almost 30,000 acres, and the Mokelumne River ran through it. The source is from an episode in which Heath is on trial in a ghost town with another man (played by Leslie Nielsen), and tells the judge how much land they have. Lawson Hill ran the ranch until he was murdered in 1861. His wife Euphemia ("Auntie Hill") then became the matriarch. During their marriage, they had four children, one daughter and three sons. Today, the location of the ranch is covered by the waters of Camanche Reservoir. A California state historical marker standing at Camanche South Shore Park mentions the historic ranch.

In the first episode, titled "Palms of Glory", the grave of Thomas Barkley (1813–1870) is shown after he is mentioned to have fought the railroad 6 years before. Later in the same episode, Frank Braun reminds Nick, Jarrod, and Eugene, "Six years ago, your daddy and mine fought and died for this," indicating the year is 1876. The episode "The Odyssey of Jubal Tanner" gives conflicting information. Audra states that her father died 6 years ago, which would—per "Palms of Glory"—point to 1876, but Jubal seems to imply that he has been gone 30 years since his wife Margaret Tanner's death, her grave marker showing that she had died in 1854, which would put the year around 1884. In the second-season episode "Hide the Children", Nick makes reference that President Ulysses Simpson Grant is in the White House. Grant's term of office was from March 4, 1869, to March 4, 1877. In the fourth- and final-season episode "They Called Her Delilah", the telegram Jarrod received from Julia Saxon dated April 27, 1878, can be seen on screen. In the fourth-season episode "The Prize", Heath buries the wife of an outlaw, adding a grave marker dated May 5, 1878. In the episode "The Jonah", the band at a town dance can be heard playing Johann Strauss II's "Emperor Waltz" or "Kaiser-Walzer". The waltz was first performed in Berlin on October 21, 1889, which, by the time it would have reached the American West, would indicate a time period of 1890 or later, much later than other historical references in the show.

=== Filming ===
While The Big Valley is set primarily in and near the city of Stockton, the filming of the series took place in Southern California from "Palms of Glory" to "The Royal Road". It was partially filmed in Wildwood Regional Park in Thousand Oaks, California.

Wilfred M. Cline, Technicolor associate cinematographer on Gone with the Wind (1939), was director of photography for several Big Valley episodes, together with Chas E. Burke. Due to similarities in appearance, it is sometimes believed that the Tara set from Gone with the Wind was repurposed for use as the Barkley family home in The Big Valley, but it was actually the set constructed for The Kentuckian that was used.

=== Music ===
The theme music was composed by George Duning, who scored the pilot and 58 episodes; Lalo Schifrin was responsible for the third season, and Elmer Bernstein for the fourth. According to IMDB.com, Joseph Mullendore wrote music for two episodes, while Herschel Burke Gilbert and Rudy Schrager scored one each. Paul Henreid, of Casablanca fame, directed a number of episodes.

The series's main title theme and primary incidental music were composed by George Duning and feature sweeping musical elements highly reminiscent of classic American cinematic Westerns. For at least the first pilot episode, the theme music starts with a more relaxed woodwinds introduction leading into the title refrain at a moderate tempo. For the remainder of season one, the tempo is increased and the intro is shortened, with much more aggressive phrasing. For seasons three and four, the main theme was reworked again, with a much more brass-heavy orchestration. The final refrain (when Miss Barbara Stanwyck's credits are shown), includes an underlying Spanish rhythm outlined with tambourine that is similar to that of The Magnificent Seven main title. Therefore, at least three versions of the theme song were recorded for the series.

In 1966, a soundtrack album was released in both monoaural and stereo versions, featuring suites of various music cues from the series, re-recorded for the LP release (ABC-Paramount; ABC 527). The album featured the iconic main theme song, but at slower tempos, giving them a more cinematic mood. To date, the album has not been re-released on compact disc or streaming. In 1980, the LP was reissued on vinyl on MCA Records for the Japanese market.

== Reception ==
=== Popularity ===
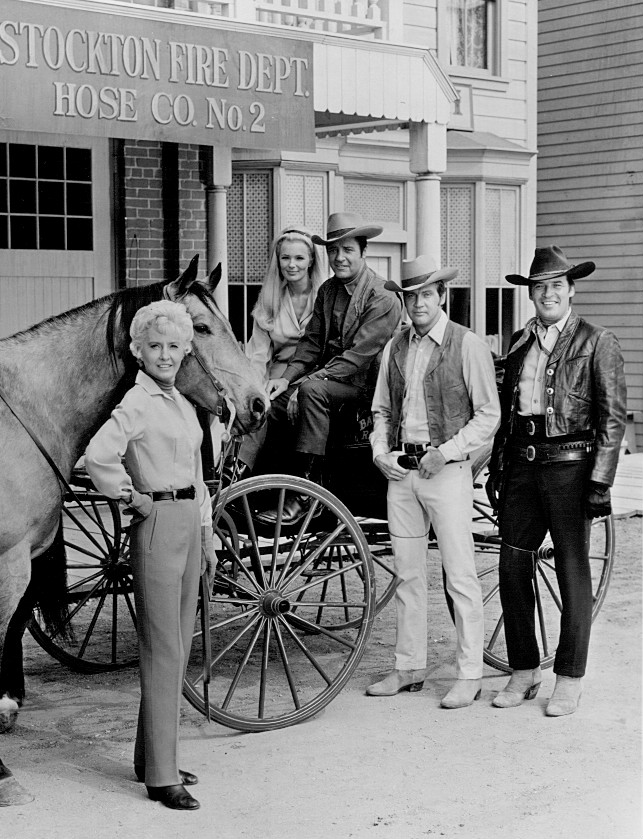
Series cast in 1968: Barbara Stanwyck, Linda Evans, Richard Long, Lee Majors and Peter Breck

Despite the series' popularity, its ratings never made the top 30 in the yearly ratings charts. The Big Valley was cancelled in 1969 as the TV Western craze began to fade, and to make room for more modern series. In Ella Smith's 1973 biography, Starring Miss Barbara Stanwyck, Smith noted that The Big Valley had been cancelled by ABC mainly due to a poor time slot. In better times, the series had been enough of a hit to outlive various time-slot rivals during its run (mainly on Mondays at 10 pm), including The Jean Arthur Show, Run for Your Life, and I Spy. According to Broadcasting magazine (September 27, 1965), its debut episode (actually Wednesday at 9 pm, where the series aired for half the season) placed 39th in the Nielsen ratings for the week of September 13–19, 1965.

The Big Valley also was ranked as one of the top-five favorite new shows in viewer TVQ polling (the others were Get Smart, I Dream of Jeannie, Lost in Space, and F Troop). Early into its second season, The Big Valley was still a mid-range performer, placing 47th out of just 88 series during the week of October 28, 1966, which was higher than such shows as That Girl, Daniel Boone, Petticoat Junction, and The Wild Wild West. Even so, The Big Valley was popular enough to warrant at least three TV Guide covers. It also acted as a launching pad for two projected spin-offs from special episodes. A 1968 episode guest-starring Van Williams was meant to lead to a Rifleman-like series titled Rimfire. A March 1969 episode, "The Royal Road", guest-starring heartthrob Sajid Khan as a young rogue, was also hoped to lead to a series, but by that year, the rising popularity of CBS's The Carol Burnett Show — and vocal complaints by Joey Bishop, ABC's late-night talk show host, that the show's faltering ratings were not helping to provide his program with a proper lead-in — ultimately led to the drama's demise. In syndication, The Big Valley proved exceptionally popular in the United States, Europe, and Latin America.

In the comedy film Airplane! (1980), the wacky air traffic controller Johnny, played by Stephen Stucker, paid homage to Big Valley's penchant for big drama in one of his many asides. After Lloyd Bridges' character frets about a pilot who cracked under pressure, Johnny says: "It happened to Barbara Stanwyck!" and "Nick, Heath, Jarrod – there's a fire in the barn!" The Big Valley also has seeped into the darker cinematic subconscious. In Bug, an acclaimed 2006 thriller starring Ashley Judd and Michael Shannon as drug addicts, their characters spiral into a hallucination that leads them to imagine tiny bugs have invaded their dwelling, with one referring to the little critters as "matriarchal aphids" that act "like Barbara Stanwyck in Big Valley."

=== Awards and nominations ===
In 1966, for her first season as Victoria Barkley, Barbara Stanwyck won the Emmy for lead actress in a drama series. She was nominated two more times (1967 and 1968) for her work in The Big Valley and earned three Golden Globe nominations as Best TV Star for the part, as well (1966, 1967, 1968). On March 15, 1967, Stanwyck was named favorite TV actress at the Photoplay magazine awards, which aired as a special episode of The Merv Griffin Show (David Janssen of The Fugitive was named favorite TV actor). Richard Long helped present Stanwyck her Gold Medal at the event.

The Big Valley was also recognized during its run for its polished production. In 1966 and 1968, the American Cinema Editors named Valley the year's Best Edited Television Program (for the episodes "40 Rifles" and "Disappearance", respectively).

== Adaptations ==
=== Comic book ===
Dell Comics published a short-lived comic book for six issues in 1966-69. (The last issue reprinted the first, and came out two years after issue #5). All issues had photo covers.

=== Film ===
Several episodes have been combined into concurrent-running feature-length TV movies, while the notable two-part episodes, "Legend of a General" and "Explosion!", have also been made into TV movies. These have been issued on DVD as a box set, alongside seasons one and two.

In July 2009, it was reported in The Los Angeles Times that filmmakers Daniel Adams and Kate Edelman Johnson were producing a feature adaptation of The Big Valley with production to begin in April 2010 in New Mexico and Michigan. In 2012, the film, initially intent to star Susan Sarandon, and then Jessica Lange as Victoria Barkley, was placed on indefinite hold after Adams was indicted for fraud pertaining to two previous films and sued by investors in Valley who claimed foul, as well.

== Home media ==
20th Century Fox Home Entertainment released the first season on DVD in Region 1 on May 16, 2006. Season 2, Volume 1 was released on January 30, 2007.

On January 8, 2014, Timeless Media Group announced it had acquired the rights to the series. They have subsequently released seasons 2 & 3 on DVD. The fourth and final season was released on October 28, 2014.
