= Shipmates (film) =

1931 film

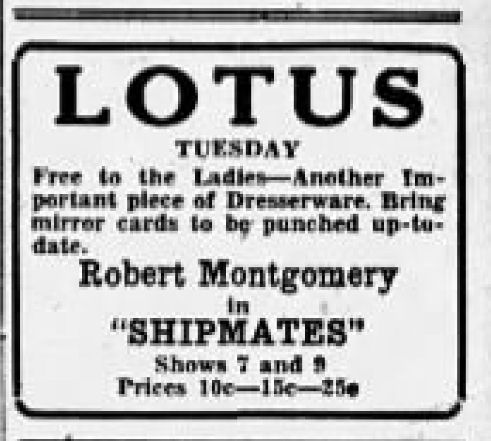
- Newspaper advertisement
- Directed by: Harry A. Pollard
- Screenplay by: Louis F. Edelman; Delmer Daves; Raymond L. Schrock; Frank Wead; Malcolm Stuart Boylan
- Based on: Maskee by Ernest Paynter
- Produced by: Harry A. Pollard
- Starring: Robert Montgomery; Ernest Torrence; Dorothy Jordan; Hobart Bosworth; Cliff Edwards; Gavin Gordon
- Cinematography: Clyde De Vinna
- Edited by: William LeVanway
- Production company: Metro-Goldwyn-Mayer
- Distributed by: Loew's Inc.
- Release date: April 25, 1931
- Running time: 72 minutes
- Country: United States
- Language: English

Shipmates is a 1931 American Pre-Code comedy film directed by Harry A. Pollard and written by Louis F. Edelman, Delmer Daves, Raymond L. Schrock, Frank Wead, and Malcolm Stuart Boylan. The film stars Robert Montgomery, Ernest Torrence, Dorothy Jordan, Hobart Bosworth, Cliff Edwards and Gavin Gordon. The film was released on April 25, 1931, by Metro-Goldwyn-Mayer.

== Cast ==
- Robert Montgomery as Jonesey
- Ernest Torrence as Scotty
- Dorothy Jordan as Kit
- Hobart Bosworth as Admiral Corbin
- Cliff Edwards as Bilge
- Gavin Gordon as Mike
- Joan Marsh as Mary Lou
- Edward Nugent as What-Ho
- E. Alyn Warren as Wong
- George Irving as Captain Beatty
- Hedda Hopper as Auntie
- William Worthington as Admiral Schuyler
- Eddy Chandler as Sailor (uncredited)
- Bud Geary as Deck Officer (uncredited)
- Robert Livingston as Man on Patio Escorting Girls (uncredited)
- Paddy O'Flynn as Sailor (uncredited)
- Charles Sullivan as Chief Petty Officer (uncredited)
