= The West Point Story =

The West Point Story may refer to:

- The West Point Story (film), a 1950 musical film directed by Roy Del Ruth and starring James Cagney
- The West Point Story (TV series), a 1956–58 television drama series about the United States Military Academy
