= Charles Briles =

American film and television actor

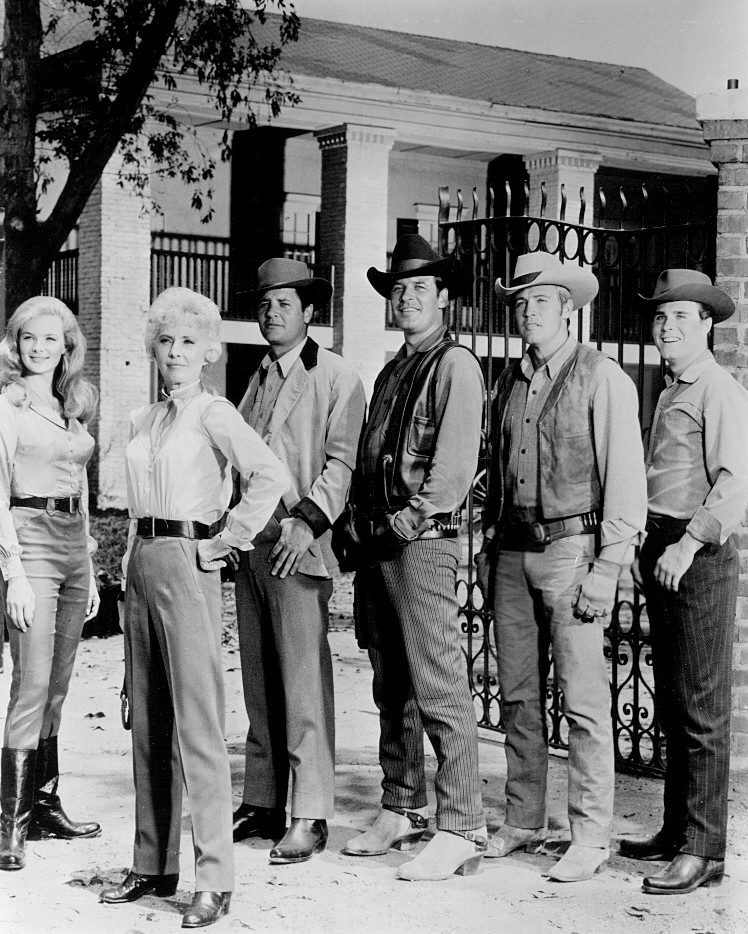
- Briles (right) with The Big Valley cast, 1965
- Born: December 17, 1945; Gardena, California, U.S.
- Died: June 12, 2016 (aged 70); Portland, Oregon, U.S.
- Occupations: Film and television actor
- Spouse: Kathy Briles
- Children: 2

Charles Briles (December 17, 1945 – June 12, 2016) was an American film and television actor. He played Eugene Barkley in the first season of the American western television series The Big Valley.

== Life and career ==
Briles was born in Gardena, California. When he was a teenager, he performed at the Westchester Playhouse with the Kentwood Players. He originally worked behind the scenes, but wanted to become an actor. He played Eugene Barkley in the ABC western television series The Big Valley.

While appearing in The Big Valley, Briles received a draft notice in 1965 and had to leave the series. He served in the California Army National Guard until 1972. His character on The Big Valley was written out of the series, as his character Eugene Barkley went to study medicine in Berkeley.

After he stopped acting, Briles worked as a TV screenwriter. Briles also worked as a stage director on productions in Southern California, and he produced and wrote at the Northrop Corporation of California. He resided in Orcutt, California.

== Death ==
Briles died on June 12, 2016 of congestive heart failure in Portland, Oregon, at the age of 70.
