= Kate Edelman Johnson =

American film producer

Kate Edelman Johnson is an American film producer and daughter of motion picture and TV producer, Louis F. Edelman, and the widow of Deane F. Johnson, an entertainment attorney and Managing Partner of O'Melveny & Meyers who later became President of Warner Communication, Inc. and Time-Warner, Inc., who died on February 28, 1999 at the age of 80 after a battle with Alzheimer’s disease.

She started her career working for her father on his television series (which?) and then moved to New York to work for Roone Arledge at ABC Sports. She also worked as an entertainment consultant to Hallmark Television and for Radio Télévision Luxembourg (RTL). She manages the rights to some of the television series' produced by her late father in the 1950s and 1960s.

Johnson is involved in creating screenplays and TV series based on these characters, including the Emmy-nominated documentary "Saving Grace". Her late husband left her the rights to the film "A Streetcar Named Desire" which he co-produced. She keeps it in syndication and licenses film clips. 80% of her earnings from "Streetcar" goes to support the work of the Motion Picture & Television Fund.

After her husband's death, she created the Deane F. Johnson Alzheimer's Research Foundation for funding research focused on the prevention and cure of Alzheimer's disease. She chairs its board of directors.

In October 2004 Johnson and Dr. Jeffrey Cummings, M.D., Director of the UCLA Alzheimer's Disease Center opened the Deane F. Johnson Center for Neurotherapeutics at UCLA.

In August 2006, Johnson and Dr. Cummings were invited to China to speak about the Johnson Center and to discuss the latest advancing treatments. This has resulted in discussions for sister facilities being developed in Schezuan Province and Beijing. Johnson and Dr. Cummings initiated a partnership with the Ambassador Health Care facilities in Fishers, Indiana.

Johnson is a trustee of the Actors' Fund of America and serves on the Council of the Next Generation of the Motion Picture and Television Fund. She supports the American Film Institute and United Cerebral Palsy, in memory of her mother Rita Edelman.

Johnson endowed the Deane F. and Kate Edelman Johnson Professor of Law and Professor, at Stanford University.
