= Louis F. Edelman =

American film producer (1900–1976)

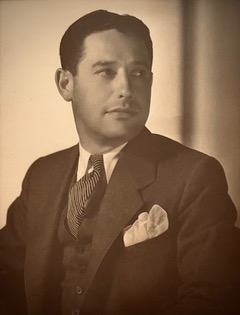

Louis F. Edelman (May 18, 1900 – January 6, 1976), was an American screenwriter and producer. He produced 39 films between 1935 and 1952, including the Fred Astaire musical You Were Never Lovelier (1942) and the gangster classic White Heat (1949) starring James Cagney.

He was also active in television, having produced such series as ABC's The Big Valley, The Life and Legend of Wyatt Earp (1955–1961) and NBC's sitcom set in Tin Pan Alley, Love and Marriage (1959–1960). starring William Demarest and Stubby Kaye. He was also producer (in later seasons, executive producer) of The Danny Thomas Show.

== Early life ==
Louis F. Edelman was born in New York City on May 18, 1900. At 15 he entered Harvard on a full scholarship. He interrupted his education to enlist in the Navy and was sent to Annapolis Officers' Training School where he attained the rank of lieutenant JG. In WWI he rescued his entire crew after they were torpedoed in the North Atlantic for which he was decorated with the Navy Cross. His film, Submarine D-1 was based on these experiences. When he finished his Navy service he returned to Harvard.

== Career ==
After graduating he entered the film business as a movie salesman for the Loew's Theatre Group. As his goal was to produce films, he moved to Hollywood in 1929 and got a job managing the Loew's State and Egyptian Theaters. It was there, during a preview, that he met Irving Thalberg, the production chief at Metro-Goldwyn-Mayer. Thalberg asked that the theatre manager sit with him during the preview of a film that the studio was not pleased with—he wanted the opinion of a man who was used to audience reactions. He was so impressed with Edelman's comments, that he hired him the next day. He worked on a succession of assignments at MGM before joining Warner Bros. in the mid-1930s, first as an associate producer and then as a writer/producer. During his long career, he produced over 85 films not only for Warner Bros. but also for Columbia and 20th Century-Fox. Some of his credits include the definitive gangster film, White Heat, with Jimmy Cagney, for which Edelman received an Academy Award nomination in 1950, both as writer and producer. His other credits include G-Men (Edelman coined that phrase as he thought "Government Men" was too long for a movie theatre marquee), A Song to Remember, (the story of Chopin), You Were Never Lovelier, The West Point Story, Here Comes the Navy, I'll See You in my Dreams, Marked Woman, and Hotel Berlin, among others.

His writing credits included Shipmates (1931), Flirtation Walk (1934), Shipmates Forever (1935), Jezebel (1938), White Heat (1949), I'll See You in My Dreams (1951), and numerous episodes of Make Room for Daddy, Wyatt Earp, and The Big Valley.

After completing The Jazz Singer and I'll See you in My Dreams, with Danny Thomas, Danny asked Edelman to come up with an idea that would keep him at home. He was on the road so much that his children called him "Uncle Daddy". It was then that Edelman created the long-running TV series Make Room for Daddy. He then went on to create or produce The Andy Griffith Show, The Real McCoys, The Life and Legend of Wyatt Earp, The Adventures of Jim Bowie, The Californians, The Barbara Stanwyck Show, Love and Marriage, The Joey Bishop Show, and The Big Valley.

In Australia he produced Adam's Woman (1970).

Edelman was president of the Producers Guild of America from 1965 to 1967.

== Personal life ==
In 1933, he married Rita A. Adelson, the daughter of Florence and Abe N. Adelson. They had two daughters, actress Rosemary Edelman and Kate Edelman Johnson.

He died on January 6, 1976, in Los Angeles.
