= List of Petticoat Junction episodes =

This is a complete list of all 222 episodes of the 1963 to 1970 television sitcom Petticoat Junction. There were 74 episodes in black-and-white and 148 in color.

== Nielsen ratings/TV schedule ==
During its first four years, Petticoat Junction was a major ratings success. However, with the departure of Kate following the third episode of season 6, the show's ratings declined continuously. Another reason was the show's new time slot, which was Saturdays at 9:30 p.m., an extremely weak air time.

Season	Episodes	Premiered	Ended	Timeslot	Seasonal rank	Overall rating
1	38	September 24, 1963	June 9, 1964	Tuesdays at 9:00 P.M.	#4	30.3
2	36	September 22, 1964	June 15, 1965	Tuesdays at 9:30 P.M.	#15 (tie)	25.2
3	34	September 14, 1965	May 10, 1966	Tuesdays at 9:30 P.M.	#21	22.3
4	32	September 13, 1966	May 9, 1967	Tuesdays at 9:30 P.M.	#23 (tie)	20.9
5	30	September 9, 1967	March 30, 1968	Saturdays at 9:30 P.M.	#35 (tie)	19.0
6	26	September 28, 1968	March 29, 1969	Saturdays at 9:30 P.M.	#38	19.9
7	26	September 27, 1969	April 4, 1970	Saturdays at 9:30 P.M.	Not in the Top 30	

== Cast ==
Regular cast
Role	Played by	Season						
Role	Played by	1	2	3	4	5	6	7
Kate Bradley	Bea Benaderet	Main	Main	Main	Main	Main	Main	
Uncle Joe Carson	Edgar Buchanan	Main	Main	Main	Main	Main	Main	Main
Betty Jo Bradley	Linda Kaye Henning	Main	Main	Main	Main	Main	Main	Main
Billie Jo Bradley	Jeannine Riley	Main	Main					
Billie Jo Bradley	Gunilla Hutton			Main				
Billie Jo Bradley	Meredith MacRae				Main	Main	Main	Main
Bobbie Jo Bradley	Pat Woodell	Main	Main					
Bobbie Jo Bradley	Lori Saunders			Main	Main	Main	Main	Main
Steve Elliott	Mike Minor				Main	Main	Main	Main
Floyd Smoot	Rufe Davis	Main	Main	Main	Main	Main		Main
Charley Pratt	Smiley Burnette	Main	Main	Main	Main			
Sam Drucker	Frank Cady	Main	Main	Main	Main	Main	Main	Main
Dr. Janet Craig	June Lockhart						Main	Main

== Episodes ==
=== Season 1 (1963–64) ===
All episodes in black-and-white

No. overall	No. in season	Title	Directed by	Written by	Original release date	Prod. code
1	1	"Spur Line to Shady Rest"	Richard Whorf	Paul Henning	September 24, 1963	001
Homer Bedloe, troubleshooter for the C.& F.W. Railroad, is sent by railroad president Norman P. Curtis (Roy Roberts) to the little community of Hooterville to find out why a branch line doesn't connect with the main line. The branch line carries the "Hooterville Cannonball" train, and is vital to the Shady Rest Hotel, run by Kate Bradley, her three grown daughters and "Uncle Joe" Carson. Kate and the girls take the train into Hooterville to shop at Sam Drucker's store. Bedloe is at the train station and can't believe the way the train is being run. Bedloe finds out that train engineer Charley Pratt is letting Betty Jo Bradley drive the train. Instead of going directly to Pixley, the train is making a several hour layover at the Shady Rest and Bedloe is furious. After everyone's had dinner, Bedloe informs them that he's from the Railroad's main office. If Bedloe succeeds in shutting down the Cannonball, Kate faces ruin. Because he fired Charley and Floyd Smoot, Bedloe tries to run the train himself so he can get to Pixley. Bedloe can't get the train started and decides to spend the night at the hotel. John Ashley as passenger Fred. Eddie Quillan as passenger Dick. Note: Bedloe is played by Charles Lane in the first of 24 appearances on the show.
2	2	"Quick, Hide the Railroad"	David Alexander	Paul Henning & Mark Tuttle	October 1, 1963	002
Kate and the girls want to keep Homer Bedloe asleep so he'll miss the Cannonball's run to Pixley. That will prevent him from initiating proceedings that would permanently terminate the train's operation. The girls then bring Homer breakfast in bed. Bedloe is quite upset when the train leaves without him. Kate proceeds to kill Bedloe with kindness during lunch. The girls then sing for Homer. Kate has to keep him at the Shady Rest long enough to convince him that the Cannonball is an integral part of the valley's life. None of this works as Bedloe is still determined to shut the train down. The train takes off again, but this time the train car that Bedloe is in is disconnected from the engine. Bedloe then tries to pump a railroad handcar to get to town, but that doesn't work. When all else fails, Kate gets Sam, the Hooterville Jack of all professions, to scare Bedloe into changing his mind.
3	3	"The President Who Came to Dinner"	David Alexander	Ed James & Seaman Jacobs	October 8, 1963	004
Kate wants to go into town, but the Cannonball is two hours late. The girls wonder if Homer Bedloe was able to shut the train down. The Cannonball finally shows up. C.& F.W. Railroad President Norman P. Curtis is incensed that ace troubleshooter Homer Bedloe utterly failed to scrap the Hooterville Cannonball. Norman says that upgrading the Hooterville - Pixley line would save 30 minutes for the "Fenton City Flyer" train. Taking matters into his own hands, Norman decides to do it himself, incognito. Norman is dropped off near Hooterville by his helicopter. The downdraft from the helicopter take-off causes Norman to tumble over an embankment and onto the railroad tracks, ripping and dirtying his suit and losing his wallet in the process. Norman waves down the Cannonball and boards the train. With his dirty appearance and no money, Curtis comes across to Kate and others as a hobo. He is surprised when the train stops on a trestle so they can go fishing. Norman starts to have a change of heart when he experiences Kate's hospitality and kindness. Uncle Joe thinks Kate is being too nice to Curtis. To pay for his keep, Kate suggests that Norman help Joe with his chores. Curtis is enjoying the simple life. He sings the "Wooly Boogie Bee" stanza from "Apple on a Tree" for everyone while on a picnic. Back in the boardroom, Curtis tells them that he's leaving the Cannonball alone. Norman goes back to the Shady Rest for another relaxing visit. Eve McVeagh as Miss Hammond, Curtis' secretary.
4	4	"Is There a Doctor in the Roundhouse?"	David Alexander	Ed James & Seaman Jacobs	October 15, 1963	005
The girls are preparing for the annual Shady Rest Jamboree. Norman Curtis, who has fallen in love with life at the Shady Rest, is still staying there for free without Kate yet knowing his true identity. He tells everyone that he has a connection to the railroad and can get a flatcar with seats to bring more people to the jamboree. On the way to get the flatcar, Charlie and Floyd let Norman drive the Cannonball. He accidentally breaks the throttle handle of the Hooterville Cannonball and folks won't be able to get to Kate's Jamboree. Norman decides to come clean about his identity. The problem is no one believes him. In fact, they all believe he's still "Nutty Norman". But the executive tries to make amends with a determined effort to obtain the nearly nonexistent replacement part. Norman pumps a handcar to Hooterville to make a phone call; the telephone number there is "Hooterville 3". Norman brings three of his friends in to help: retired General Frank Newton (Addison Richards) who is chairman of the Michigan and Southwest Railroad, George Prentice (Charles Meredith) of World Wide Airways (also called "World Wide Airlines" in the episode) and Dave LaSalle (Douglass Dumbrille) of Intercontinental Telephone. Everyone thinks the three are also hobos. Uncle Joe listens in on the men's conversation while they're eating and Joe thinks they're all crazy. Norman and his friends get the Cannonball all fixed up. Thanks to Norman, the Jamboree is a success. Cheerio Meredith as Nettie. Mary Young as Lydia.
5	5	"The Courtship of Floyd Smoot"	Sherman Marks	Ed James & Seaman Jacobs	October 22, 1963	006
Floyd Smoot, the conductor, is courting a woman named Camille through the mail. Meanwhile, the girls are depressed because the Hooterville Hornets football team and their coach Uncle Joe are on a losing streak. Floyd gets a letter from Camille and she ends it after receiving a photo of him in a silly toupee. He now loses all confidence. Kate tries to make him think all the women from Hooterville and the surrounding area have eyes for him and are disappointed that he took up with an outsider. Floyd is feeling a little better about himself. Sam tells Joe that the local merchants kicked in money to give Joe if he resigns from coaching. Joe wants fast running Betty Jo to play in the next game, but Kate says no. Something Billie Jo and Bobbie Jo say to Floyd leads him to believe that Kate has been secretly in love with him. Floyd asks Kate to marry him. Kate comes up with a plan to scare Floyd off of her, but it doesn't work. Kate's next plan involves the Cannonball and Floyd chooses the train.
6	6	"Please Buy My Violets"	David Alexander	Richard Baer	October 29, 1963	003
Salesmen Mr. Blake (George Cisar) and Mr. Gordon (Phil Gordon) complain to Billie Jo about the mosquitoes in the hotel. She tells them new screens for the windows are to arrive today. When the Cannonball comes by, the screens are not on the train. Uncle Joe spent Kate's screen money to buy cases of men and women's cologne to make a fast buck reselling it. The girls mistakenly think royalty is coming to the hotel because Joe wants to introduce them to "Lord and Lady Violet", the names of the cologne. It turns out that the cologne is really lousy smelling. Kate hopes to sell the cologne at cost to Sam. A Coffee Salesman (Olan Soule) at Sam's store tells them that he tried selling the cologne when he was a kid. It smelled bad even then. Joe decides to go around Hooterville and try to sell some cologne, but has no luck. Betty Jo tells Kate that the salesmen have had enough of the mosquitoes and want to check out. The girls talk Mr. Gordon into buying the cologne. Mr. Blake says that he tried selling it but couldn't because it smelled so bad. The men are going to sell it as insecticide. Note: First appearance of Fred Ziffel (Hank Patterson) Smiley Burnette and Rufe Davis do not appear in this episode.
7	7	"The Ringer"	David Alexander	Richard Baer	November 5, 1963	007
It's time for the annual Shady Rest Horseshoe Tournament and the hotel will soon be very busy. Legendary Pixley Fats (Henry Calvin), who has won countless times, is predicted to win again. When Kate finds out how well Betty Jo can throw a horseshoe, she signs up Betty Jo to be the first female contestant in the tournament's history. Uncle Joe thinks it's an insult to the men to have a teenage girl compete. The tournament has started and Pixley Fats is doing great as usual. Betty Jo does win her first match. Things progress to where Pixley Fats and Betty Jo are in the finals. Betty Jo experiences conflicting emotions when she finds herself with an opportunity to defeat Pixley Fats. After a talk with Kate, Betty Jo decides that winning means more to Pixley Fats than to her, because that's all he really has in life. Pixley Fats congratulates Betty Jo on pitching a good game. Kate is proud of Betty Jo.
8	8	"Kate's Recipe for Hot Rhubarb"	Jean Yarbrough	Dick Wesson and Joel Kane	November 12, 1963	008
Billie Jo has to come up with a fourth for her double date with Junior Hocker and Junior's visiting friend Roger Budd (Jack Bannon). Kate suggests Bobbie Jo to her. Billie Jo doesn't think Bobbie Jo would be a good fit as she knows all the boys see Bobbie Jo as a book worm instead of a fun girl. When Kate asks Bobbie Jo if she would like to go on a date that evening, Bobbie Jo says she would rather read. Bobbie Jo admits that she just doesn't feel comfortable around boys yet. Junior and Roger show up and Bobbie Jo is very uncomfortable. They all leave for the date, but Bobbie Jo comes home early saying she just can't compete with Billie Jo. Kate spends a lot of time and tries to teach Bobbie Jo how to flatter a man the way Billie Jo does. Kate even gets Bobbie Jo to talk guest Mr. Blake (George Cisar) into extending his stay. On her next date with Roger, things go much better. Note: Smiley Burnette and Rufe Davis do not appear in this episode.
9	9	"The Little Train Robbery"	Sherman Marks	Ed James & Seaman Jacobs	November 19, 1963	009
Two young men, Arthur Gilroy (John Wilder) and Lowell Rightmeyer (Jimmy Hawkins), are on their way to rob the bank in Pixley. They change their plans when they learn that the next day, the Cannonball, without any armed guards, will make its run from Hooterville to Pixley for the bank shipment. Arthur and Lowell decide to stay the night at the Shady Rest. Kate and the family are happy to have two polite and handsome young men stay with them. Arthur and Lowell do hold up the train the next day. But, Kate and Uncle Joe are also on the train and Kate recognizes the masked bandits. Arthur and Lowell learn that the bank shipment is only deposit slips. But, because of something Floyd says, they decide to rob the Shady Rest instead. When the boys open the safe behind the front desk there's a cat with her kittens inside. Arthur tries to be a tough guy but everyone else just goes about their business. The boys wind up staying for dinner and Kate knows they're basically good guys. Joe comes back with Trooper Benson (Norman Leavitt) and says that Arthur and Lowell are dangerous crooks. Everyone tells Benson that the boys are not criminals and didn't do anything wrong.
10	10	"Bedloe Strikes Again"	David Alexander	Paul Henning & Mark Tuttle	November 26, 1963	010
The Cannonball is pelted with eggs and tomatoes after the Hooterville Hornets, coached by Uncle Joe, lose what may be their worst game ever. Another unexpected passenger is Homer Bedloe, who despite being hit with an egg, is surprisingly cordial and pleasant. When Kate hears that Bedloe is on the train, she gets worried. Bedloe is very friendly to Kate and she believes he is up to no good. Sam learns from Willie Trankis (William Benedict) that Bedloe has sent for John Fisher (John Hoyt) and Max Thornton (John Hubbard), two bigwigs from the railroad. They are coming for a surprise inspection the following day. Bedloe hopes the men will shut the Cannonball down. Sam is able to warn Kate about Bedloe's plan. Despite it being dark out, everyone goes to clean up the Cannonball. They even update the interior. Kate tries to keep Bedloe preoccupied so that he won't know what they're up to. Fisher and Thornton arrive and board the train. The men get very deluxe service and are very impressed. Fisher and Thornton think that Bedloe needs a different position with the railroad because he clearly was wrong about the Cannonball.
11	11	"Uncle Joe's Replacement"	David Alexander	Story by : Dick Wesson and Marty Roth; Teleplay by : Marty Roth and Dick Wesson & Joel Kane	December 3, 1963	011
Kate and the girls go to Drucker's store to pick up the pocket watch they ordered for Uncle Joe's birthday present. While there Kate, in an effort to boost clumsy Herby Bates' confidence, inadvertently offers him a job as Assistant Manager at the hotel. Now Kate doesn't have the heart to not give him the job, so she decides that she can give him some menial tasks at the hotel. Uncle Joe believes he is being put out to pasture with Herby showing up. Kate tries to explain things to Joe, but there's another misunderstanding and Joe's says he's leaving. He goes in search of another job. He gets one, telling everyone that he got a big executive job. Joe goes back to the hotel and brags about his new job. He rents a room and then brags to some of the other guests. Kate is tired of Joe's bragging and thinks he's making stuff up. Kate follows him and finds out his big job is actually mopping floors in a cafe. Kate talks Sam into hiring Joe and Billy Jo. Joe makes a lot of bad decisions at Sam's store and Sam wants to fire him. Kate and Sam figure out a way to get both Herby and Uncle Joe back to their real jobs. Kate and the girls give Joe his birthday present. Beverly Wills as Mrs. Norton. Note: Smiley Burnette and Rufe Davis are credited but do not appear in this episode.
12	12	"Honeymoon Hotel"	Guy Scarpitta	Keith Fowler and Phil Leslie	December 10, 1963	012
Uncle Joe comes up with another get-rich scheme to attract guests to the hotel: Name the hotel "Honeymoon Haven" and advertise it as a wedding/honeymoon destination. Joe hopes to get Sam, the county judge, to swear him in as temporary Justice of the Peace until the next election. Sam is going away on a hunting vacation at Lost Lake. He swears Joe in and tells him to file the documentation at the County Courthouse to make it legal. A young couple named Walter Shepherd (Tommy Ivo) and Elsie Gregg are the first to take advantage of the honeymoon package deal. Joe performs the ceremony and then realizes that he forgot to file the documentation at the Courthouse. It's the weekend and the Courthouse won't be open until Monday. Joe tells Kate what happened. Kate and the others have to stall Walter and Elsie from consummating their wedding, while Joe tries to get Sam up at Lost Lake. Walter and Elsie are exhausted and disappointed. Joe and Charley finally bring Sam back and he performs the ceremony and then Walter and Elsie fall asleep.
13	13	"A Night at the Hooterville Hilton"	Jean Yarbrough	Story by : Ed James & Seaman Jacobs; Teleplay by : Bill Manhoff	December 17, 1963	015
Kate gets a letter stating that Gladys Stroud (Elvia Allman), travel columnist from The Centerville Sun Express, will be coming to the hotel. Kate has been trying for years to get Gladys to come by. Apparently something she saw in a brochure about the Shady Rest made her want to see the hotel. Kate learns from Uncle Joe that a brochure he made describing the incomparable Shady Rest Hotel of the future was accidentally mailed to Gladys. In the brochure was the vision of what he hoped the hotel would one day be, including an indoor ice rink, bowling alley, swimming pool and other luxuries. Kate wants Joe to meet Gladys at the train and tell her the truth and hopefully she won't close them down for lying. Joe can't tell her and he brings her to the hotel. Now the family has to scramble to keep her from finding out the truth. The next morning the family continues their ruse. Despite their best efforts, Gladys finds out. Uncle Joe manages to sweet-talk Gladys into not closing them down. Shug Fisher as Salesman. Note: This is the first of Elvia Allman's 19 appearances on the show. Smiley Burnette appears in one scene but is not credited. Rufe Davis does not appear in this episode.
14	14	"Cannonball Christmas"	Guy Scarpitta	Paul Henning and Mark Tuttle	December 24, 1963	014
It's Christmas Eve. Homer Bedloe tells Railroad President Norman Curtis that he knows of a train that is violating company rules. He wants to make an inspection of the train, but he won't tell Norman which train it is. The Bradleys, Sam Drucker, Herby, Charlie and Floyd are going to decorate the Cannonball for its annual trip of caroling and gift-giving around the valley. Joe and Charlie are bickering over who will play Santa. Bedloe shows up and wants the decorations taken off the train. Bedloe gives Joe a legal writ empowering him to seize and hold the train. Everyone tries to be nice to Bedloe so hopefully he'll change his mind. Norman finds out what Bedloe is up to and goes to Hooterville to stop him. Norman arrives at the hotel and Joe still thinks he's a hobo. Horman straightens out Bedloe and forces him to dress as Santa. The decorated Cannonball makes its Christmas Eve run. Gloria Marshall as Miss Evans. Note: Linda Henning does not appear in this episode, although her voice is heard and a stand-in doubles for her. The only scene she "physically" appears in is redubbed footage from the episode "Quick, Hide the Railroad".
15	15	"Herby Gets Drafted"	Jean Yarbrough	Story by : John Elliotte; Teleplay by : John Elliotte and Dick Wesson	December 31, 1963	013
Sam tells Kate and the girls that Herbie has been drafted and leaves tomorrow. Herby is depressed because he thinks no one will miss him. Kate and the girls cheer Herby up, but then Junior Hocker just puts Herby down. The girls suggest Herby could be an astronaut. They want to throw a party for him that night. Uncle Joe decides he needs to promote Herby's future political career to the whole town. That night there's a big crowd for the party. Herby is sweet on Billie Jo and wants to spend some alone time with her. Joe interrupts them. He talks to Herby about going into politics after his stint as an astronaut. Herby is excited as he sees this as a way to capture Billie Jo's heart. After six days, Herby tells Kate he got a discharge for minor medical problems. He's worried everyone will think he's a failure. Kate finds an elaborate way for him to save face with Billie Jo and the rest of the town.
16	16	"Bobbie Jo and the Beatnik"	Jean Yarbrough	Bill Manhoff	January 7, 1964	018
Bobbie Jo meets Alan Landman (Dennis Hopper), a mad-at-the-world young poet and slacker from New York. Despite Bobbie Jo liking him in every respect, he dismisses her way of life. After hearing how handsome he is, Billie Jo goes to see Alan. Billie Jo finds him to be very rude. Bobbie Jo brings Alan to the hotel. Knowing how Bobbie Jo feels about Alan, Kate tries to make him feel welcome. After dinner Kate arranges a poetry reading. Alan gets upset when he reads one of his poems and no one understands it. Kate has a talk with Alan. He tells her he really likes Bobbie Jo and wants to send for her when he gets to New Orleans. Kate asks if he intends to get a job and he says no. Kate wants to figure out a way to make Bobbie Jo come to the conclusion on her own that Alan and his life do not deserve to be romanticized. Alan is about to leave. Kate introduces Alan to Roger Stanley (Hugh Sanders), who is President of a dog food company. Roger says that he's offered $2000 to people in his company for a good jingle, but no one can come up with something. Bobbie Jo is surprised when Alan sells out his principals and tries to write a jingle. Turns out Roger is really a salesman and was just helping Kate out. Note: Linda Henning does not appear in this episode.
17	17	"My Daughter the Doctor"	Jean Yarbrough	Ed James & Seaman Jacobs	January 14, 1964	016
Paul Henderson (Paul De Rolf) is teaching the girls and Junior Hocker the "Hooterville Hop". Billie Jo receives a $500 insurance endowment, which her late father set aside for his first-born to become a doctor. But Billie Jo wants to go to Hollywood to become an actress. Kate hopes that Hooterville's long time doctor, Dr. Depew, can talk Billie Jo into it. Floyd tells Kate about Dr. Depew's handsome new assistant, Dr. Clayton Harris (Adam West). Kate now believes that Dr. Harris would be the man to convince Billie Jo to turn to medicine. Kate lies and tells Clayton the Uncle Joe is sick. Kate gets Joe to play along. Kate has to stall for time because Billie Jo has left the hotel. Billie Jo finally shows up and they go back to examine Joe. Kate wants Billie Jo to assist Dr. Harris. Billie Jo faints at the first sight of blood. Clayton winds up joining everyone in doing the "Hooterville Hop".
18	18	"Hooterville vs. Hollywood"	Jean Yarbrough	Dick Wesson	January 21, 1964	017
Billie Jo is still determined to use the $500 from her father to go to Hollywood to become a movie star. It doesn't help that Uncle Joe, who wants to go with her, is fueling her dream. Kate talks with Judge Drucker to see if she can legally prevent Billie Jo from going to Hollywood, but he advises against it. Dr. Depew (Don Beddoe) believes Kate's mistake between Dr. Harris and Billie Jo was throwing them together in a professional relationship. He thinks they should throw them together in a doctor/patient relationship. First, they have to trick Billie Jo into thinking she's sick. Dr. Depew has Dr. Harris examine Billie Jo. Dr. Harris doesn't find anything wrong with her. Dr. Depew suggests that Clayton check in on her over the next few days. Joe takes some publicity pictures of Billie Jo. Kate is disappointed that Billie Jo hasn't taken a liking to Clayton and will then want to stay in town. Kate has Sam print a fake edition of the Hooterville World Guardian to give to Billie Jo. An article in the paper makes Billie Jo decide to stay, pursue Clayton and become a doctor.
19	19	"Visit from a Big Star"	Ralph Levy	Bill Manhoff	January 28, 1964	019
Uncle Joe has made a deal with Lucy Wayne (Joan Marshall), the secretary of movie star Lane Haggard (John Vivyan), for them to stay for two weeks at the Shady Rest. Incognito as Mr. Jones, Haggard, according to Miss Wayne, needs to get some rest and relaxation away from prying public eyes. But upon their arrival, Lucy believes Joe has misled her. It seems that Joe has told most of the valley about their stay. Miss Wayne also wanted no attractive women around to fall under Haggard's movie idol charms. Kate and the girls are not quite as homely as Joe described them. The problem arises that those charms do surface without Haggard realizing what he is doing. Joe charges some local girls to sneak a look at Lane through a window. The Bradley girls become quite taken with Lane's nice comments to them. Kate doesn't want the girls to get hurt, so she has a talk with Lane. Kate learns from Lucy that she would actually like to marry Lane. Kate finds a way to have Lane marry Lucy right there. Margaret Bert as Older Woman.
20	20	"Last Chance Farm"	Guy Scarpitta	Hannibal Coons & Harry Winkler	February 4, 1964	020
Business is bad at the Shady Rest and Kate's only guest, Mr. Begley (Don Brodie), is leaving. Kate needs to make a $200 bank loan payment at the end of the week. Uncle Joe meets Henrietta Boswell and Gertrude Hawley, who are lost and looking for Madame Bovary's Hideaway Reducing Farm. He convinces them that the Shady Rest is the most exclusive reducing farm and charges them $100 each for a week. The catch is that Joe provides them with a money-back guarantee. Joe convinces the ladies that Kate is actually 75 years old and looks as good as she does because of the hotel's program. Joe tells the women that the secret to weight loss is to eat whatever they want as long as it is combined with turnip greens. He also has them do what would normally be all his chores. Joe tries to hide from Kate why the women are staying at the hotel. He also rigs the scale to make the ladies think they're losing weight. Kate finds out what Joe has been up to and wants to tell the women the truth. Joe comes up with a way for the ladies to not believe what Kate will tell them. The two women do whatever they can to find what they believe is Kate's miracle weight loss and youth secret. They find that Kate's secret is hard work and that Joe tricked them. But they still pay because they had a great time. Note: Smiley Burnette and Rufe Davis do not appear in this episode.
21	21	"The Very Old Antique"	Jean Yarbrough	Jack Raymond	February 11, 1964	021
When Kate unexpectedly sees Homer Bedloe in Hooterville, she knows trouble is in store. Bedloe plans on selling the Cannonball, a seemingly one-of-a-kind antique locomotive. His buyer is millionaire retired train man and antique-train aficionado Phillip Waterhouse (Everett Sloane). Waterhouse and his secretary, Mr. Cassidy, arrive. Waterhouse is an old, ornery and snobbish man. With Charley and Floyd's help, Kate hopes she can convince Waterhouse that the train is in such disrepair that it's not worth buying. Kate's plan backfires when she learns Waterhouse enjoys repairing old trains. Kate gets Waterhouse and Cassidy to stop at the Shady Rest. Kate hopes to talk to Waterhouse, so Billie Jo and Bobbie Jo keep Cassidy busy. Joe tries to sell Waterhouse various items in the hotel. Waterhouse knows that Kate is going to try to talk him out of buying the train and the two exchange words. Somehow Kate gets through to Waterhouse and he decides to not buy the train.
22	22	"The Art Game"	Guy Scarpitta	Jerry Seelen & Leo Rifkin	February 18, 1964	022
A traveling salesman guest leaves Uncle Joe a set of six paint-by-number canvases in lieu of a cash payment. Joe decides to take up painting and hopes to make money with his new venture. Joe hangs a painting up behind the front counter and everyone thinks it's bad. Mr. Cheever (Lyle Talbot), an antique dealer, buys Joe's first painting. Joe now thinks he is a new art master on his way to success. However, the dealer only wanted the valuable picture frame. Before wrapping up the painting, Joe trades the frame for one he believes is nicer. News of the painting sale spreads throughout Hooterville. People come by to see Joe's other paintings, including E. T. Gibbs (Ian Wolfe) from a local museum. Gibbs hates the paintings, which depresses Joe. Cheever comes back to get the original frame he bought. Kate comes up with a plan for Cheever to get the frame and for Joe to feel better. Olan Soule as Mr. Parks, Cheever's assistant.
23	23	"Betty Jo's First Love"	Guy Scarpitta	Hannibal Coons & Harry Winkler	February 25, 1964	023
Billie Jo, Bobby Jo, Paul Henderson and Roger Budd (Jack Bannon) are doing the "Hooterville Hop" in the lobby of the hotel. They learn that Betty Jo has her first crush on a boy named Orville Miggs (Jimmy Hawkins). But the object of her affections is more interested in tinkering with cars than he is in romance. As such, all Orville sees in Betty Jo is a mechanic's expert assistant. Kate doesn't want to see Betty Jo get hurt. Kate thinks he will see her in a different and more romantic light if she wears a dress and becomes a bit more feminine. Betty Jo gets upset when Orville says it was a silly idea to wear a dress to work on a car. When Kate asks how Betty Jo's day was, she starts crying. Kate has a talk with Orville, but makes no progress. Betty Jo tries a new romantic tactic, but all Orville thinks about is cars. Kate decides to throw a dance party for the girls. Joe, Charley and Floyd pretty much force Orville to agree to go. That night at the party, Joe has to force Orville to dance with Betty Jo. Betty Jo kisses Orville and is not that impressed. They decide to stay friends and work on the car.
24	24	"Behind All Silver, There's a Cloud Lining"	Jean Yarbrough	Martin Ragaway	March 3, 1964	024
Kate wants Uncle Joe to dig a drainage ditch down by the tracks. Homer Bedloe is back in Hooterville trying again to shut down the Cannonball. He believes there must be something in the financial books since Charley and Floyd have not submitted a report in twelve years. Bedloe thinks he's found something and calls President Norman Curtis. Norman isn't interested in Bedloe's findings. Joe comes up with a plan to get guests to dig for silver down by the tracks. He figures others will do the ditch digging for him. Bedloe decides to sell leases all along the track from Hooterville to Pixley for people to prospect for silver. In the process, all the digging will just rip up the tracks. Kate figures out what Bedloe is up to. She comes up with a way to outsmart him once again. It'll keep the Cannonball running and on brand new tracks. However, Joe almost ruins it. Norman Curtis also teaches Bedloe a lesson. Glenn Strange as Hawley. Patrick Waltz as Assayer.
25	25	"The Talent Contest"	David Alexander	Dick Wesson	March 10, 1964	025
Uncle Joe tells everyone that a regional talent contest will be held in Hooterville and at the Shady Rest. The winner will get $50 and a trip to Chicago to be on the television broadcast final. The girls want to enter, but Kate worries how competition between the girls will affect their relationships. Joe wants the girls to really try to win, hoping if one of them wins, he could go with her to Chicago. The girls think that Kate could use the $50. Joe finds a way to talk any real competition into not entering the contest. Kate notices the girls starting to fight amongst themselves. She also learns what Joe has been up to and wants the contest to be fair. Kate goes to talk to all the people Joe did. It's the night of the contest. After their performances, the girls decide they were only thinking of themselves and drop out of the competition. Nora Marlowe as Mrs. Whipple. Note: Bobbie Jo sings "Three Little Words," Billie Jo recites "The Raven," and Betty Jo dances to "Oh! Susanna." At the end, the girls harmonize on "The Hooterville Cannonball."
26	26	"Kate and the Manpower Problem"	Guy Scarpitta	Dick Wesson & Joel Kane	March 17, 1964	026
An old school chum of Kate's named Emily Mapes (Rosemary DeCamp) comes to the Shady Rest with her new husband Avery. Emily thinks it's time Kate was married again, but Kate says she's too busy. Emily tells the girls they need to get Kate to think about finding a man. Uncle Joe thinks that if Kate finds a man, he will lose his job. To round up some prospects to go to the Shady Rest to court Kate, the girls offer special rates to single men. The girls do bring quite a few men to stay at the hotel. Joe pretends to be the house detective and tells guest Grover Woodstock (Walter Reed) to leave Kate alone. Kate finds out from Grover what her daughters have been up to. She comes up with a plan with all the men to teach her girls a lesson. Reverend Mimms (Jess Kirkpatrick) comes by the hotel and almost ruins Kate's plan. Robert Carson as Wilbur Spriggs. Note: This was Rosemary DeCamp's first appearance on the show; she appeared again in the last six episodes of Season Five as Kate's sister Aunt Helen during Bea Benaderet's absence. Smiley Burnette and Rufe Davis do not appear in this episode.
27	27	"The Ladybugs"	Donald O'Connor	Paul Henning & Mark Tuttle	March 24, 1964	027
Beatlemania has hit Hooterville. Uncle Joe recruits Billy, Bobbie, and Betty Jo along with their friend Sally Ragsdale (Sheila James) to form their own band called the Ladybugs. Kate is not happy that Joe took the bank payment to buy the Ladybug outfits for the girls. The girls and Joe try to tell Kate how rich they're going to be. Kate thinks it's all a joke. Colonel Partridge (Jesse White), a booking agent, comes to the Shady Rest to see the girls in action. Billie Jo brings in a bunch a boys who want to see the Ladybugs. The Ladybugs perform a song and the boys go wild. Partridge likes what he hears and wants to book the girls. Sally's father, Sheriff Ragsdale, comes by and says he wants his daughter to finish school and not tour the country. Uncle Joe thinks he has a way to save the group and dresses up as a Ladybug. Note: Smiley Burnette and Rufe Davis do not appear in this episode.
28	28	"The Hooterville Flivverball"	Jean Yarbrough	Hannibal Coons & Harry Winkler	March 31, 1964	028
Uncle Joe is haggling with Sam over the price of a washboard. Charlie and Floyd are ready to leave with the Cannonball. After several warnings, the Cannonball leaves without Joe. Joe walks back to the Shady Rest and is mad at Charlie and Floyd. Betty Jo shows Joe Orville Miggs' "Flivverball", an old car converted into a railway car. Joe decides to start his own transport business by partnering with Orville and using his car. The girls try to talk Joe out of his scheme. At first the Flivverball is a success. Kate refuses to feed Joe, Charlie and Floyd until they apologize to each other. They refuse. Joe smells Charlie and Floyd cooking in the Cannonball and joins them. The food is horrible. The men make up and go have a meal at the hotel.
29	29	"Kate the Stockholder"	David Alexander	Jerry Seelen & Leo Rifkin	April 7, 1964	030
Norman Curtis, President of the C&FW Railroad, is currently on vacation in Europe. He left instructions not to do anything to the Cannonball while he's gone. However, Homer Bedloe has a scheme to shut down the Cannonball for good. He hopes to do it without disobeying Curtis' orders. The plan entails Bedloe being appointed Superintendent of the Cannonball. He would then enforce an efficiency program with an impossible to meet new schedule. He expects Charley and Floyd will eventually just give up. Vice President J. B. Giddings likes Bedloe's idea and thinks the stockholders will be happy. Bedloe arrives at the Shady Rest and gives Charley and Floyd the new rules. Bedloe is making things miserable for them and everyone at the hotel. Kate learns from Charley what Bedloe is being paid to be Superintendent. Kate and the gang go to the stockholders meeting where she believes they've got a secret weapon to ruin Bedloe's plans and have him sent somewhere else. Ned Wever as First Stockholder.
30	30	"Kate and the Dowager"	Dick Wesson	Dick Wesson	April 14, 1964	031
Mr. Bunce (Jonathan Hole) with the bank is doing an inspection of the hotel and is not planning on extending Kate's financing. Wealthy socialite Clara Watkins (Doris Packer) checks into the hotel with her son Sonny. Sonny apparently is quite wild and has been expelled from his sixth college. Clara thinks the Shady Rest will have a calming effect on Sonny. Bunce will only extend Kate's financing if Mrs. Watkins recommends the hotel to her wealthy friends. Meanwhile, annoying Sonny is constantly chasing after Billie Jo. Clara wants the two of them to get married. While Kate wants to do what she can to please Mrs. Watkins, she has to say no to that. Clara becomes quite upset and wants to check out. Joe decides to romance Clara and she soon accepts his marriage proposal. Kate tries to talk both of them out of it, but it doesn't work. With Charley and Floyd's help, Kate comes up with a plan to save Joe. Clara reveals something that makes Bunce extend Kate's financing. Billie Jo finds a way to have Sonny chase Bobbie Jo.
31	31	"Charley Abandons the Cannonball"	David Alexander	Hannibal Coons & Harry Winkler	April 21, 1964	032
Charley begins to believe that everyone seems too busy to spend any time with him. Floyd has started to call on the widow Sarah Lawrence. Uncle Joe has a speech he has to prepare, so has no time to go fishing with him. Kate has far too much work to do around the hotel. Betty Jo, who enjoys being Charley's co-engineer, has a date with Orville Miggs. Charley doesn't want to spend his time alone and miserable running the Cannonball. He decides to quit and move to the big city. Kate tries to talk him out of it, but Charley says he's already arranged a replacement. Kate makes up a story about Orville rushing into marriage with Betty Jo and she would like Charley to talk to him. After talking to Orville, Charley gets mad when he realizes Kate made it up. Charley picks up Bill Tuttle (Bob Hastings), his replacement. Tuttle doesn't like the carefree way the Cannonball is run. When Charley realizes how much he is loved and needed, he finds a way to talk Tuttle out of staying. Note: Pat Woodell does not appear in this episode.
32	32	"Dog Days at Shady Rest"	David Alexander	Andy White	April 28, 1964	033
Kate receives a telegram from Railroad President Norman Curtis that he is sending Homer Bedloe with someone named Fred. Fred is actually Mr. Curtis' housekeeper's old basset hound. Curtis believes Fred needs some good country air and space to re-energize himself. Curtis also hopes that Bedloe will soften his ways in the process. Bedloe tries to tell Kate he's a changed man, but she doesn't trust him. Fred is already feeling better. Bedloe wants to find a way to bring Fred back to Curtis in worse shape than when he left. Maybe that will change the way Curtis feels about the Shady Rest. Bedloe gets Joe to inadvertently frighten Fred and the dog hides under the bed. Kate now knows what Bedloe is up to. She tries to cheer Fred up with a bunch of girl dogs, but it doesn't work. Kate figures out a way to bring back spirit to Fred and a way to break Bedloe's spirit.
33	33	"A Millionaire for Kate"	Richard L. Bare	Martin Ragaway	May 5, 1964	034
The girls are about to go on a trip to visit their Aunt Winifred and Orville has agreed to help Uncle Joe. An old friend of Kate's from high school sent a letter saying he is coming for a visit. His letter implies that he is now wealthy, and is coming back to the valley on personal business. Kate admits that she had a crush on H.J. Grant (Hayden Rorke) back then. Joe, however, believes that Herbie is a con artist. Joe overhears Kate and Herbie having a nice conversation. Joe decides he needs to break up any chance of a romance between Kate and Herbie. He invites "man crazy" Mabel Snark to come and meet Herbie. Joe even tells Sheriff Pete Ragsdale to come by. Orville finds a magazine article that proves Herbie is wealthy. Now Joe wants Kate to marry Herbie. Kate and Herbie are having a quiet dinner together. Ragsdale and Mabel show up. Joe tries to stop them from interrupting the couple. Kate and Herbie want to remain just friends. Note: Smiley Burnette and Rufe Davis do not appear in this episode.
34	34	"Bedloe and Son"	Dick Wesson	Dick Wesson	May 12, 1964	035
Homer Bedloe arrives at the Shady Rest with his son, Homer Bedloe Jr. (Steve Franken), who is as hateful and devious as his father. He even looks like his father down to the horn-rimmed glasses. Bedloe Sr.'s plan is that he wants to appear the loving and caring father, bringing his son up right. At first Kate doesn't think Bedloe has changed, but then she starts to believe that he wants the best for his son. Bedloe will then leave Jr. alone at the Shady Rest to snoop around and find a way to shut down the Shady Rest and the Cannonball for good. Jr. takes a train ride with Charley and Floyd and they stop to go fishing. He's never fished before and has a good time. Betty Jo and Bobbie Jo get Jr. to dance with them. Jr. confesses to Kate that his father wants to shut down the hotel and the train. But Jr. comes to like everyone because he is treated with kindness and goodwill for no apparent reason. Bedloe comes back and he can't believe Kate and the gang have turned his son into a nice guy.
35	35	"Local Girl Makes Good"	David Alexander	Jerry Seelen & Leo Rifkin	May 19, 1964	036
Business executive Mary Jane Hastings (Elena Verdugo) returns home to Hooterville to receive the Chamber of Commerce award. Apparently Uncle Joe talked her into staying at the Shady Rest, because of the so called modern conveniences. When she arrives, Kate notices that everyone seems to be at her beck and call, especially the men. Kate doesn't like the effect Mary Jane has on her girls. They are now ordering Roger Budd and Phil Willis (Bart Patton) around. Kate blames Mary Jane's assistant Steve (Peter Hansen). He sets the example that whatever Mary Jane wants, she gets. Kate learns that Steve is in love with Mary Jane. Kate tells Steve he needs to stop being the ever obedient servant. But when Steve stands up to Mary Jane, she fires him. After learning that Mary Jane is in love with Steve, Kate finds a way to bring them back together. The girls learn a lesson about how to treat Roger and Phil.
36	36	"Cave Woman"	Guy Scarpitta	Story by : Richard Baer; Teleplay by : Richard Baer and Joel Kane	May 26, 1964	037
Uncle Joe wants to dig out an old cave to use as a wine cellar for the hotel. Kate receives a telegram from Brooks T. Webster (John Clarke), who wants to possibly hold a convention at the Shady Rest. He will be arriving that afternoon. Joe causes a landslide covering up the cave entrance with Kate inside the cave. Kate finds a small hole to the outside just big enough for her head. They will need Ding Woodhouse's tractor to remove all the rubble to get Kate out. But Ding's tractor needs some work done on it and won't be ready until the morning. Webster arrives and insists on dinner, but Kate isn't there to cook. To stall for time, Billie Jo throws on the charm and flirts with Brooks. But Brooks still wants to eat. Joe comes up with a plan to feed Webster and get the convention business. Joe and the girls really have to hustle to get the food to Webster. The next morning, Ding gets Kate out of the cave. Webster tells them that the final decision about the convention will be up to the President of the company, who will arrive the next morning. Note: Smiley Burnette and Rufe Davis do not appear in this episode.
37	37	"Kate Flat on Her Back"	Guy Scarpitta	Joel Kane	June 2, 1964	038
After getting out of the cave, Kate sprained her ankle, which means she will be off her feet for three or four days. Now that Mr. Webster's gone, the family has to prepare for Mr. Hurley Feasel's (Barry Kelley) visit. He is the one that will decide if the convention will be held at the Shady Rest. Uncle Joe decides to make some changes to the hotel he's sure will appeal to conventioneers. He also hires Smokey Harner (Don Dubbins), a country singer and guitarist. Mr. Feasel arrives early and is not impressed with anything about the hotel. Hearing about all the new ideas, Kate believes Joe and the girls may be running the hotel better than she did. Kate recovers quicker than Dr. John Rhone (Willis Bouchey) expected. But she wants to keep her recovery a secret because she thinks everything is running smoothly and wants the family to feel good about themselves. With everything going wrong in the hotel, including Smokey singing a song that Feasel hates, Feasel leaves. The girls want to keep Kate from finding out Feasel left. They try to make it sound as though the hotel was full of conventioneers. Kate finds out the truth. But Feasel later returns for a very unusual reason. Note: Pat Woodell, Smiley Burnette and Rufe Davis do not appear in this episode.
38	38	"The Genghis Keane Story"	Jean Yarbrough	Jack Raymond	June 9, 1964	029
Kate's former grade school teacher returns to Hooterville. Kate and her children reminisce how Miss Adelaide "Genghis" Keane (Lurene Tuttle) was so strict on all the children, and she was a dreaded teacher. Kate and the girls are surprised to find that the retired elderly schoolteacher is now meek and timid. They all get together to bring Miss Keane's confidence back. It doesn't take long for Miss Keane to become a disciplinarian again. Uncle Joe tells Kate that Adelaide has been driving potential customers away. Kate and the girls are beginning to regret what they did. Before Kate can confront her, Adelaide acknowledges that she has gone too far and is scaring people off. Kate and the girls enlist some of the locals to come to a class on Monday nights. Miss Keane is happy to be teaching again and moves into town by the library. Eddie Quillan as Mort. Barbara Pepper as Ruth Ziffel. Ken Osmond as Harold Boggs.

=== Season 2 (1964–65) ===
All episodes in black-and-white

No. overall	No. in season	Title	Directed by	Written by	Original release date	Prod. code
39	1	"Betty Jo's Dog"	Richard L. Bare	Jay Sommers & Lou Huston	September 22, 1964	6401
It's the first day of school and Kate is having trouble getting a couple of her daughters motivated to go. Betty Jo has a new friend, a little dog that follows her back from school. Kate refuses to let Betty Jo keep the dog, despite it being cute and well trained. Kate believes that he must belong to someone. Betty Jo brings him back to school, but he still follows her home. Kate takes the dog to a couple local farms, but no one knows him. Kate puts an ad in the paper and decides to let the dog stay until the owner claims him. But if the dog starts to cause problems for the family, he goes, claimed or not. The dog does end up causing some problems and winds up getting sprayed by a skunk. Kate says the dog has to go, but then she has a change of heart and lets him stay. Douglas Evans as Mr. Pierson. Note: "Dog" is played by Higgins, one of the best-known dog actors of the 1960s and 1970s, in the first of his 149 appearances on the show.
40	2	"Race Against the Stork"	Richard L. Bare	Jay Sommers & Lou Huston	September 29, 1964	6402
Henry Barton (Robert Easton) is dropping off his pregnant wife Elsie (Olive Sturgess) at the Shady Rest. While the baby isn't due for two weeks, Henry still wants someone to watch Elsie as he will be gone for three days. The women aren't at all worried, but Uncle Joe is quite concerned. Joe gets even more panicked when Kate tells him most babies arrive in the middle of the night. He comes up with an elaborate plan involving some of the men of the valley to get Doc Stuart (Frank Ferguson) to the Shady Rest if Elsie has the baby in the middle of the night. Joe tells Kate they could make more money by turning the hotel into a maternity home. Without warning anyone, Joe has a trial run of his plan at 3am just to make sure it all goes smoothly. Everyone is quite mad at Uncle Joe. To make matters worse, Joe does it a second time. When Elsie does actually go into labor, things don't go as planned. It looks as though Kate will have to help with the delivery. Doc Stuart finally gets to the hotel after the baby boy is born. Tom Fadden as Ben Miller. Kay E. Kuter as Newt Kiley. Walter Baldwin as Grandpappy Miller. Hank Patterson as Fred Ziffel. Barbara Pepper as Doris Ziffel.
41	3	"Have Library, Will Travel"	Richard L. Bare	Hannibal Coons & Harry Winkler	October 6, 1964	6403
Uncle Joe isn't thrilled with the idea of turning the Cannonball's baggage car into a mobile library. He likes even less having to build the library shelves. But after meeting her, Joe grows extremely fond of pretty librarian Phyllis Marsh (Dianne Foster). Despite their age difference, among other things, Joe is not shy about romancing Phyllis. Joe uses some shoe polish to darken his hair. Phyllis' fiancé, Hal Jackson (Robert Harland), shows up sooner than expected and she tells him she has a date with Joe. At the end of the evening, Phyllis gives Joe a little kiss. The next day, Phyllis introduces Hal to Kate. Phyllis wants to find a way to let Joe down easy without hurting his feelings. Kate comes up with a plan to show Joe how inappropriate he and Phyllis are as a couple. Kate and Hal pretend to be crazy about each other. Joe thinks Kate's making a fool of herself. To break the two up, Joe tells Kate he introduced Hal to Phyllis. Note: Linda Henning does not appear in this episode.
42	4	"The Umquaw Strip"	Richard L. Bare	Jay Sommers & Lou Huston	October 13, 1964	6404
Sam, Charley, Floyd and Uncle Joe are rehearsing a reenactment of the signing of the treaty between the Umquaw Indians and the C&FW Railroad. The treaty gave Indian land in the vicinity of Deadman's Curve to the company. Joe thinks the reenactment will bring in tourists to the area and guests to the hotel. Meanwhile, Norman Curtis (Roy Roberts) wants the company's stockholders' meeting to be held at the Shady Rest with Homer Bedloe (Charles Lane) filling in for him. Norman tells Bedloe he doesn't want anyone to vote for anything that would harm Kate or the people of the valley. Bedloe finds out about Joe's treaty reenactment plan. He then finds out that the Umquaw never signed the treaty according to C&FW files. Bedloe lets the Umquaw know. Despite not really wanting to do it, Chief Fleeteagle (Benny Rubin) and Black Salmon (Bernie Kopell) make what will be a profitable deal for them and the end of the Cannonball. It turns out they have a large inventory of Indians souvenirs that they will now be able to unload. Kate comes up with a way to keep the Cannonball running and Chief Fleeteagle will get a franchise to sell the souvenirs. William O'Connell as Martin Evans.
43	5	"As Hooterville Goes"	Richard L. Bare	Jay Sommers & Lou Huston	October 27, 1964	6406
Hooterville has a long standing record of being the first community to have their political votes submitted to the state. Pip Winslow from Crabwell Corners is taking bets that they will beat Hooterville this year, because they have a new automatic voting machine. Hooterville may lose regardless because of a disagreement between Kate and Selma Plout. Selma threatens to cast her ballot late in the day just to spite Kate. A letter from the Governor comes addressed to the Hooterville Chamber of Commerce, which doesn't exist. So they can open the letter, Joe, Charley and Floyd create the Chamber. The Governor hopes they can extend their 20 year record. Because of something Floyd says, Kate believes she has a way for Selma to change her mind. The Chamber of Commerce presents Selma with a voter of the year award and she'll get her picture in the paper. The girls and some friends start to wake people up to vote. Despite a couple of set-backs, including Joe being late to vote, Hooterville gets their votes in first. Herman Hack as Philbert. Note: Virginia Sale makes her first of eight appearances on the show, six of them as the valley's prickly resident Selma Plout, later played in 17 episodes by Elvia Allman. Pat Woodell does not appear in this episode.
44	6	"My Dog the Actor"	Richard L. Bare	Jay Sommers & Lou Huston	November 10, 1964	6405
Betty Jo wants to enter Dog in a contest to make a commercial for Tailwagger Dog Food. The winner also receives a $500 cash award. Kate tries to discourage Betty Jo because Dog doesn't have a chance against purebreds. The girls are thrilled when they receive a letter telling them that Dog is one of the five finalists. The letter also says that Mr. Talbot (Ross Elliott), with the dog food company, will be coming by to see Dog. Despite at first thinking Dog didn't have a chance, Joe now sees money to be made being Dog's manager. What they don't know is that Henry Brewster, the local photo-finisher, who sent in both his and the Bradleys' entries, got the pictures interchanged. Joe tries to teach Dog to do tricks. Mr. Talbot and his photographer, Johnson, arrive. They discover that Henry's collie is actually one of the five finalists. But after meeting Dog and thinking about it, Mr. Talbot has an idea for a whole series of other commercials. He would like to use Dog and the entire family. Mr. Talbot is starting rehearsals for the screen test, but Joe's meddling is annoying him. When they put down some food for Dog to eat, he won't go near it. Note: Smiley Burnette and Rufe Davis do not appear in this episode.
45	7	"The Great Buffalo Hunt"	Richard L. Bare	Jay Sommers	November 17, 1964	6407
Kate sends Uncle Joe to the store to buy some meat. But he brings home a buffalo that he bought from the government. Kate tells him to take it back, but all sales were final. It's part of his scheme to dupe wealthy British sportsman Lord Harold Faversham (Reginald Gardiner) into coming to "Shady Rest Hunting Lodge" to hunt wild buffalo. When word gets out that Faversham stayed at the hotel, Joe figures they'll make a lot of money hosting other hunters. But, the buffalo is far from wild and the girls want to keep him as a pet. Another problem arises when Joe spooks the buffalo by firing his rifle and the animal runs off. Faversham arrives and Joe tells him that there are buffalo all over. Joe somehow stalls Faversham for three days. The Lord is growing tired of Joe and threatens to sue for fraud. Joe learns that the girls were able to catch the buffalo and have been hiding it. Kate comes up with a way for Faversham to have all the hunting he wants. It involves hunting from the Cannonball with a gun loaded with blanks and the girls moving the buffalo to different locations. Faversham figures out what Joe is up to. Faversham agrees not to get upset if they let him take the buffalo back to England and put it in a zoo. But will the buffalo have other ideas?
46	8	"Betty Jo's Pen Pal"	Guy Scarpitta	Jay Sommers & Lou Huston	November 24, 1964	6408
The girls are trying to learn some Japanese to make Betty Jo's Japanese pen pal, Nobuko Takamura, feel at home for her visit. Nobuko arrives and has gifts for everyone. Joe really likes the transistor radio she gives him. Nobuko has come to the US to attend college to improve her English so that she can teach it back in Japan. She would also like to learn American customs. Nobuko tells Joe that in Japan, the women do the yard work. Joe gets Nobuko to do his chores until Kate puts a stop to it. That night, Billie Jo is keeping Henry Brewster waiting for their date. While waiting, he has a nice time being pampered by Nobuko. On a picnic, Nobuko can't help but serve Billie Jo and Bobbie Jo's boyfriends, Henry and Roy Redwell. Kate tells Nobuko that the men should be the ones helping the women. Kate gives her some lessons on how to get a man to do what she wants. Nobuko catches on to that custom quite quickly. Note: Smiley Burnette and Rufe Davis do not appear in this episode.
47	9	"Bedloe's Nightmare"	Richard L. Bare	Jay Sommers & Lou Huston	December 1, 1964	6409
Billie Jo is upset that the Cannonball is late and she believes it has outlived its usefulness. Meanwhile, Homer Bedloe, the Cannonball's arch-enemy, has been having terrible nightmares about the train. To get rid of them, his psychiatrist Dr. Leonard suggests that he "learn to love" the Cannonball. The Cannonball has been encountering some broken tracks. Kate decides to let Norman Curtis at the C&FW Railroad know. Curtis has had an operation and is not in the office. Bedloe reads Kate's letter and writes back that he will fix the tracks. Bedloe's assistant, Martin Evans, delivers the letter and tells Kate about Bedloe's nightmares. Evans tells her that Bedloe now loves the train. When Bedloe visits the Shady Rest, he is surprised how friendly everyone is being to him. But Kate was just gas-lighting Bedloe and didn't really believe the change in him when he said he loved the train. She finds out Bedloe is planning to only remove the old damaged tracks instead of replacing them which will shut down the Cannonball. Kate comes up with a plan to stop him. It involves reenacting one of Bedloe's nightmares that Evans told Kate about. Curtis gets out of the hospital and makes sure Bedloe personally helps repair the tracks. Note: Pat Woodell does not appear in this episode.
48	10	"Kate's Bachelor Butter"	Guy Scarpitta	Jay Sommers & Lou Huston	December 8, 1964	6410
Jack Crandall (Stanley Adams), who is with H-D-L Food Products, is a passenger on the Cannonball. He is stunned when the train stops just so Charley and Floyd can pick apples for Kate's special recipe: Bachelor Butter. She gives it to the bachelors of the valley as a thank you for all they do for her over the course of the year. Joe, Floyd, Charley and Sam eagerly wait for Kate to finish cooking. Jack Crandall tastes the butter and really likes it. He brings a couple jars back to his company to see if he can produce it for sale. Jack sends Kate a letter stating he wants to buy the recipe for H-D-L and will pay her $250. He will pay her another $250 after she shows him how to make it in their laboratory kitchen. At the test kitchen, Mr. Stevens (Ray Montgomery) and Mr. Kimberly (John Alvin) are having a hard time translating Kate's measuring process into a precise recipe. The apple butter doesn't turn out right. Kate has all her equipment from home brought to the test kitchen, including her oven. Jack can't figure out why the next batch doesn't turn out either. Jack then realizes that they can't give the recipe what Kate gives it, home style love.
49	11	"Mother of the Bride"	Guy Scarpitta	Jay Sommers	December 15, 1964	6411
Dan Plout and Billie Jo have been spending a lot of time together. While on the Cannonball, Floyd sees Dan showing Billie Jo a ring. Kate and Selma Plout get into an argument during the Every Other Wednesday Afternoon Discussion Club. Kate claims to not have anything against Dan, despite Selma being his mother. Kate does become concerned when there's talk of Billie Jo and Dan perhaps getting married. Uncle Joe tells Kate she might want to think about becoming friends with Selma. Kate makes an attempt to be nice to Selma, but that doesn't work out too well. Rumors are flying and it's starting to look as though Billie Jo and Dan are going to elope. Early in the morning, Betty Jo sees Billie Jo climbing down a ladder from her window to meet Dan. She says she wants to go with and Dan says she can be the maid of honor. Kate finds the ladder and thinks Billie Jo went to Sam's to get married. Sam makes a call to Pixley and finds out that Dan did get married. Kate and Selma start crying in each others arms. Turns out Dan married Emily Lawrence (Diane Bond) and Billie Jo was just helping. They were keeping it a secret because Selma and Emily's mother have been fighting for years. Phil Gordon as Harvey. Note: This was Mike Minor's only appearance on the show, as Dan Plout, before becoming a regular cast member in the fourth season. Pat Woodell and Smiley Burnette do not appear in this episode.
50	12	"The Lost Patrol"	Richard L. Bare	Story by : Henry Sharp; Teleplay by : Jay Sommers & Jack Harvey	December 29, 1964	6412
Kate learns from Sam that the US Army is conducting war games in the area around the Shady Rest. Kate is worried about her three daughters because they are swimming in the water tower and wearing bikinis. Kate can't use the Cannonball to get back to the hotel because it has been "blown up" by the Green Squad. Three lost soldiers from the Blue Squad - Hank Benton, Tod Langwell and Stu Howard - come to the Shady Rest after they spot the girls. The men claim to have taken the girls as prisoners of war until Kate shows up. Kate invites the men in for something to eat. Kate doesn't mind the GIs and the girls spending time together, as long as Uncle Joe is keeping an eye on them. The boys trick Joe into getting his war medals and they and the girls sneak out of the hotel. General Patterson (Edward Platt), of the Green Squad, asks Sam how to get to the Shady Rest. Kate gets upset when she learns that Joe let the kids escape. Joe, Kate and Dog track them down. Patterson arrives at the hotel. Not knowing he's with the Green Squad, the boys hide. Once they find out which side he's on, the boys capture Patterson. More and more soldiers come by and they wind up having a large party. Kate manages to get the General to go along with things. The Blue Squad winds up winning. Jack Bannon as Jack Bevans. Note: Smiley Burnette and Rufe Davis do not appear in this episode.
51	13	"Smoke-Eaters"	Richard L. Bare	Jay Sommers & Lou Huston	January 5, 1965	6413
Uncle Joe has formed the Hooterville Volunteer Fire Department Volunteer Band. The men complain about Joe leading them. The band is so bad that it is driving paying guests away from the hotel and Kate is not happy. Joe hoped to raise money with the band to form an actual Hooterville Volunteer Fire Department. An upset Joe tells Kate she should come up with a better way to raise the money. After asking for donations only raises $62, Kates decides they need professional help. Kate wants to contact Henry Phillips (Parley Baer), who works for a company that manufactures fire equipment, and ask his help. Calling in an outsider irks Uncle Joe and he says he can get all the equipment they need for the $62 they have. Joe winds up buying a bunch of junk. Joe tells Kate he was also able to buy fire alarms. The alarms turn out to be fireworks. Kate refuses to let Joe store the fireworks at the hotel. Kate sends the letter to Mr. Phillips. Joe is running some drills with the men because he wants to show up Phillips. Phillips arrives and offers to help Joe. A drill of Joe's with Phillips goes wrong. Kate finds a way to have Mr. Phillips get them what they need. Another plan of Joe's goes wrong and the Hooterville train station winds up burning down.
52	14	"The Curse of Chester W. Farnsworth"	Richard L. Bare	John L. Greene & Jay Sommers	January 12, 1965	6414
It's a dark and stormy night in Hooterville. Mr. Richardson (Hal Smith) is a guest at the hotel. Uncle Joe tells him about the curse of Chester W. Farnsworth (Doodles Weaver), a guest at the hotel fifty years ago. He was a traveling drummer and notorious hotel towel thief. On a stormy night like this, he stole a Shady Rest towel from his room, went out into the night and was never seen again. Since then, Chester has been haunting all the hotels that he stole towels from. He has to return all the towels before he can end up in his final resting place. Joe figures it won't be long before Chester visits the Shady Rest. The next morning, Richardson is packing his bag and he takes a hotel towel. Dog sees him do it and takes the towel out of the bag. Richardson tells Kate and Joe that something made him do it. Other strange events start to occur. Kate finds out that a bunch of salesmen who were supposed to be guests won't be returning until the curse has been lifted. When more strange things occur, Kate decides to talk to Doc Stuart. He recommends speaking with Dr. Melman, a psychiatrist and an expert in paranormal events. Something happens to make everyone believe that Chester arrived and the curse has been lifted. But did he actually show up? Note: This was Dog's first appearance in the closing credits, running alongside the tracks.
53	15	"There's No Flame Like an Old Flame"	Richard L. Bare	John L. Greene & Jay Sommers	January 19, 1965	6415
Uncle Joe has been receiving and sending what appears to be love letters, but won't say who it is. Kate eventually learns that Joe is writing to Mary Alice Perkins (Lurene Tuttle). Kate is upset because Mary Alice stood Joe up at the altar several years ago and ran off with his best man, George Perkins. Joe tells Kate that George has passed away. He also admits he never loved anyone but her, and that he has now forgiven her. It seems she is coming to the Shady Rest to marry Joe. When Mary Alice arrives, Kate is put off by her snobbish ways and her meddling. She even rearranges the hotel lobby. Preparations are being made for the wedding. Boo Boo Webster (George Cisar), Mary Alice's lawyer, shows up to give the bride away. As the wedding starts, Dog brings Joe a letter that says Mary Alice has run off with Boo Boo. Everyone is kind of relieved, including Joe. They all decide to go ahead with the party.
54	16	"Billie Jo's First Job"	Richard L. Bare	Story by : Kitty Buhler & Stanley Davis; Teleplay by : Jay Sommers & Lou Huston	January 26, 1965	6418
Billie Jo wins a contest at secretarial school and is offered her first job. She will be private secretary to author Oliver Fenton (Ernest Truex). World-traveling Fenton is coming to Hooterville because his next book is based in a small town. He has rented one of the houses in town. Selma tells Kate that Fenton writes "those kind of books". After reading one of Fenton's books, Kate tells Billie Jo that she can't work for him. Uncle Joe tells Kate she has to trust Billie Jo. When Billie Jo meets Fenton, she finds him to be a graying old man. She now knows that her mother's worries are ill-founded. Joe now tells Kate he's worried about Billie Jo. Kate sends some spies to check on her. Over the next several days Billie Jo decides to have a little fun and test just how much her mother does truly trust her. Kate goes to confront Fenton and realizes Billie Jo was playing games with her. Kate and Oliver have dinner together and he asks her about her life. Kate gets Oliver's latest book and it's a romantic story based on her. Note: Pat Woodell does not appear in this episode.
55	17	"A Matter of Communication"	Richard L. Bare	Jay Sommers & Lou Huston	February 2, 1965	6419
The girls are upset that they don't have a telephone at the hotel. They can't communicate with their friends and are social outcasts. Kate says it would cost $800 for the telephone company to install two miles of line just to get to the hotel. The girls have to get their calls at Drucker's Store and it's starting to disrupt his business. Then Floyd and Charley have to go back and forth between the store and the hotel with the messages. Sam refuses to take any more calls for them. Uncle Joe decides to start his own telephone company. He plans on using the barbed wire fencing surrounding all the local farms as the primary communication lines. A bunch of the local men come to the hotel to play poker. Instead, Joe gives them a sales pitch about his phone company. Joe plans to tap illegally into the Hooterville Telephone Company's line, but Sam doesn't let him. Joe comes up with a really complicated alternative. It's not long before the whole plan falls apart.
56	18	"Kate Bradley, Girl Volunteer"	Richard L. Bare	Jay Sommers & Lou Huston	February 9, 1965	6420
Volunteer fire chief Uncle Joe has designed a new nighttime alarm system. When a valley resident sets off a skyrocket in the event of a fire, a volunteer will fire off a cannon. Joe has done this to compete with the Crabwell Corners Volunteer Fire Department. But there soon is opposition to Joe's plan because, even though the canon fires blanks, things still get damaged. A fire breaks out on the Cannonball. Because Joe has all the fire equipment at the Shady Rest, Sam has to call Crabwell Corners. Joe challenges Bink Sharfells (Dick Wessel), Crabwell Corners Fire Chief, to see which volunteer fire department is the best. When none of Hooterville's firefighters want to accept the challenge, it looks like Joe will lose by default. Joe goes to sell his wooden Indian to pay off Bink. Kate and the girls offer to stand in for the firefighters. Despite Hooterville not starting out too well, the contest winds up a tie. Joe suggests a game of checkers to break the tie. Bink loses the game to Dog. Note: Pat Woodell does not appear in this episode.
57	19	"Hooterville Crime Wave"	Guy Scarpitta	Jay Sommers & Larry Miller	February 16, 1965	6421
Convicts Barney Dawson (Marc Lawrence) and Max James (Paul "Mousie" Garner) have escaped from the state penitentiary. Meanwhile, Uncle Joe wrote a letter to the Postmaster General accusing Sam of running a lax and inefficient post office. Joe believes that if Sam posted photos of some criminals, he could capture them for the reward money. Sam makes fun of Joe being a member of the CIA (Criminal Investigators' Alliance). Sgt. Horton (Bert Freed), from the state police, comes by and tells them about Barney and Max being in the area. Joe asks if there's any reward for them and he is told no. Floyd and Charley search the hotel and Kate wonders where Dog is. Turns out that Barney and Max are following Dog. Later that evening, Barney, Max and Dog show up at the hotel. Sam and Sgt. Horton arrive pretending to be Charley and Floyd. Sam and Joe bump heads and knock each other out. Kate is able to hit Barney and Max on the head with a CIA sign, knocking them out. Sgt. Horton ties them up. Sam explains that Dog came to his store and made Sam and Horton follow him to the hotel.
58	20	"For the Birds"	Richard L. Bare	Story by : John L. Greene & Paul David; Teleplay by : Jay Sommers	February 23, 1965	6422
Kate wants to know why the Cannonball has temporarily ceased operations. Kate and Uncle Joe get the Drucker's store where the Cannonball is stopped. The reason is a bird has built a nest on top of the smokestack and has laid five eggs. Charley and Floyd refuse to move the train until the eggs have hatched. They figure it will be two weeks before they hatch. When Homer Bedloe hears of this news, he is all in support of what Charley and Floyd are doing. He even puts an article in the paper about it. But he has a reason he wants to help the birds. If the train doesn't run for two weeks, he can shut it down permanently. Kate and the girls see the article in the paper. Homer shows up at the hotel and Kate is suspicious of his motives. Billie Jo and Betty Jo overhear Homer's plan and tell Kate. Kate comes up with a plan to save both the Cannonball and the birds. Note: Pat Woodell does not appear in this episode.
59	21	"Modern Merchandising"	Richard L. Bare	Howard Harris & Jay Sommers	March 2, 1965	6423
O'Donnel's, a new supermarket, has just opened in Pixley. Sam hasn't had a customer since it opened. Even Uncle Joe goes to O'Donnel's to check it out. While there, Joe manages to annoy Mr. O'Donnel (Willis Bouchey). Kate and the girls are still loyal customers of Sam's. Joe thinks that Sam should modernize his store. Sam starts to have anxiety attacks and doesn't recognize Kate and Betty Joe. Kate and Doc Stuart convince Sam to take a two week vacation. Kate and the girls agree to look after the store for him. They decide to reorganize the store. Kate briefly leaves Joe in charge of the store and he puts in an overly large grocery order with salesman Jack Hull (Jackie Searl). Charley and Floyd bring a train full of groceries to the store. Kate is furious with Joe when she learns it can't be returned. Kate winds up at the lodge where Sam is and she is just as dazed as Sam originally was.
60	22	"Visit From the Governor"	Richard L. Bare	Howard Harris & Jay Sommers	March 9, 1965	6424
The Governor announces that he will make a grassroots tour of the state. Uncle Joe is excited by the news, but no one else seems to care. Everyone reminds Joe of the time he said the President was coming and he didn't. The Governor has not announced his itinerary, but he is welcoming invitations from interested communities. Joe wants to send an invitation to the Governor. He hopes to be able to advertise that the Governor slept at the Shady Rest. Plus, he has all the pendants he had made up when he thought the President was coming that he could sell. Kate is against the idea. Joe finds a way to authorize him sending the letter. Joe puts in the local paper that the Governor is arriving that day and there will be a reception at the Shady rest. Joe has a hard time organizing and rehearsing a welcoming as everyone is still not that excited. Joe still can't get anyone to buy a pendant. When the Cannonball arrives, there is no Governor. Turns out Joe forgot to mail the invite. An angry crowd chases after Joe. Florence Lake as Emily Simpson. Herman Hack as Townsman.
61	23	"A Borderline Story"	Richard L. Bare	Howard Harris & Jay Sommers	March 16, 1965	6425
Uncle Joe sees some surveyors down by the railroad tracks next to the hotel. He mistakenly believes that a new road is going to be built there. Joe thinks the hotel will get a lot more customers. Kate learns from surveyor Ralph Craig (William Bakewell) that the last survey done twenty-five years ago was incorrect. The new survey shows that the border between Hooterville County and Pixley County runs right through the Shady Rest. Now Joe thinks there's money to be made from curiosity seekers. Kate and the girls are shocked when they see that Joe has painted a line through the hotel. He makes a sign calling the place Twin County Hotel. The hotel does do a lot more business. Mr. Travis (J. Edward McKinley), from the Pixley License Division, tells Kate there's a lot of red tape in operating a business in two counties. Licenses and fees required could cost her in the thousands. Mr. Lindley (Murray Alper), from the Pixley Health Dept., also finds costly problems. Mr. Dixon (Milton Frome), from the Pixley Building Dept., finds more issues. Having half the hotel in Pixley also causes problems for the girls. Kate comes up with a permanent solution with the help of the Cannonball moving the hotel. Sam Edwards as Ned Balsam.
62	24	"The Shady Rest Hotel Corporation"	Richard L. Bare	Howard Harris & Jay Sommers	March 23, 1965	6426
Uncle Joe mentions investing in the stock market and Kate reminds him about the bad stock he had her invest in once before. Meanwhile, the hot water heater in the hotel springs a leak. They'll need to buy a new one. Joe suggests selling stock in the Shady Rest Hotel Corporation to pay for it. Sam is willing to sell Kate a heater at cost for $97.50. Kate doesn't have that much. Kate resorts to boiling water on the stove to get hot water for the hotel. Kate goes to see Mr. Guerney (Byron Foulger) at the Pixley Bank. But he has to turn down her request for a loan. Joe sells stock to Sam, Charley and Floyd to cover the cost of the water heater. They do this because they know Kate wouldn't accept a loan from them. Kate is not happy and still considers it charity. She comes up with a plan to teach Joe, Sam, Charley and Floyd a lesson. Mr. Guerney brings Kate some good news. Apparently that old stock she had is now worth something. Phil Gordon as Mr. Osgood.
63	25	"A Tale of Two Dogs"	Richard L. Bare	Howard Harris & Jay Sommers	March 30, 1965	6427
Crabwell Corners is suing the Town of Hooterville for possession of a Spanish-American War cannon. Crabwell Corners feels it is rightly theirs. Meanwhile, Billie Jo was supposed to go to the Pioneer Dance with her steady, Henry Brewster. But they had a big fight and Billie Jo says they're finished. Tad Winslow of Crabwell Corners challenges his lazy dog, a blood hound named Speedy, against Betty Jo's dog in an obedience contest. If Tad wins, Betty Jo has to get Billie Jo to go with him to the Pioneer Dance. Betty Jo finds out that Billie Jo made up with Henry. Kate and then Joe go to speak to the Winslow's to call off the bet. But things intensify, with now the winner getting either the Crabwell Corners' fire engine or the Spanish-American War cannon. To make matters worse, Kate and Joe find out that Speedy isn't Tad's dog after all. Tad has a well trained German Shepherd. The day of the contest arrives. The score is close, but Dog pulls a trick of his own and wins. Minerva Urecal as Martha Winslow. Robert Shayne as Mr. Fillmore. Note: Pat Woodell, Smiley Burnette and Rufe Davis do not appear in this episode.
64	26	"The Black Box"	Richard L. Bare	Howard Harris & Jay Sommers	April 6, 1965	6428
Kate's spring cleaning coincides with the US Air Force doing maneuvers over the valley. Part of those maneuvers includes testing out a new high powered camera. It looks like an ordinary black box with wires coming out of it. For security, it is set to explode twelve hours after any unauthorized removal from the plane. Colonel Millbank (Richard Erdman), who is flying the aircraft, accidentally loses the camera. It winds up landing on Shady Rest property. Meanwhile, General Elmer Loomis and Millbank try to narrow down where the camera may have landed. Joe finds it and thinking it might be valuable, brings to the hotel. But as often as Kate and the girls try to get rid of it, Dog keeps bringing it back. Loomis and Millbank finally make it to Hooterville. They learn from Charley and Floyd it may be at the Shady Rest. With little time to spare, they get to the hotel and start searching for the box. They mess everything up that had just been cleaned. Dog brings them the box with no time left. However, the box winds up being a dud and doesn't explode. Jack Bannon as Technical Sergeant. Guest star: As General Elmer Loomis, Fred Clark, who played Harry Morton opposite Bea Benaderet in 75 episodes of The George Burns and Gracie Allen Show Note: Pat Woodell does not appear in this episode.
65	27	"Bedloe's Most Fiendish Scheme"	Richard L. Bare	Jay Sommers & Lou Huston	April 13, 1965	6416
Kate has a lot of outstanding debts, plus she hasn't made a mortgage payment in six months. Uncle Joe suggests turning the hotel into an ostrich farm to raise money. Mr. Guerney, the President of the Pixley Bank, informs her that there is a new majority shareholder of the bank. Because of this, she has two weeks to pay $138 on her mortgage or the bank will have to foreclose. Mr. Guerney didn't tell Kate that the majority shareholder is Homer Bedloe, who hopes to ruin Kate. The girls say they will get part time jobs to help raise the money. When he realizes Kate is in trouble, Doc Stuart gives Billie Jo a job. Betty Jo gets a job with Fred Ziffel. Kate won't take any handouts from Charley and Floyd. Bobbie Jo is teaching piano. Joe can't find a job. Kate gets a job as a short order cook, but she doesn't last long at it. Kate and the girls do come up with the amount needed, but some of it's in I.O.U.s. Bedloe says that isn't good enough and still wants to foreclose. Mr. Guerney comes up with a way to give Kate a little more time. Dog chases Bedloe out of the hotel. Peter Leeds as Gus Clegg.
66	28	"Bedloe Gets His Comeuppance"	Richard L. Bare	Jay Sommers & Lou Huston	April 20, 1965	6417
In this second half of a two-part story, Homer Bedloe has controlling interest in the Pixley Bank and has fired its President, Mr. Guerney. He has decided not only to foreclose on Kate's mortgage, but foreclose on all the bad mortgages in the valley. That will make the Cannonball's services useless. The Shady Rest is going to host a Monte Carlo night as a modest fundraiser. Traveling salesman Mr. Davis (Harold Peary) comes by. He is surprised to see all the gambling equipment and then the girls doing a can-can dance. Kate explains that it's just for the fundraiser. Whoever wins the most fake money by the end of the evening wins the secret grand prize. Betty Jo's friend Willie gets vibrations off of the roulette wheel and can guess the number every spin. Uncle Joe wants to take Willie to Vegas to win enough money to solve all their problems. Joe can't raise the money for tickets to Vegas. With Willie and Mr. Davis' help, Kate comes up with a plan to save the valley and get rid of Bedloe. But it doesn't work. It's the night of the fundraiser and no one shows up except Bedloe. Willie comes by and says he's lost his power. Bedloe stops his foreclosures and the fundraiser goes on. Note: Smiley Burnette and Rufe Davis do not appear in this episode.
67	29	"The Mayor of Hooterville"	Richard L. Bare	Howard Merrill & Stan Dreben	April 27, 1965	6430
Because they don't have one, Uncle Joe wants to be named the Mayor of Hooterville. And as mayor, he would get an all expenses paid trip to the state capitol for the state's mayors' convention, and a free haircut. Sam, Charley and Floyd don't think that Hooterville needs a mayor. If they have a mayor, that person should be elected. They and the girls convince Kate to run, even though she really doesn't want to. When Joe learns Kate is running, he decides to move out of the Hotel. Selma Plout will do anything she can to make sure Kate doesn't win. She even becomes Joe's campaign manager. But they have a hard time gathering anyone to listen to Joe speak. Kate on the other hand has no problem getting people to her rally. Selma also has another reason to help Joe, she would like to be the mayor's wife. Kate and the girls miss Joe. Kate tells Sam and Selma that she's dropping out of the race. Joe wants to drop out as well so he doesn't have to marry Selma, but a law says he can't. Kate make sure Joe's wooden Indian gets enough write in votes to win.
68	30	"Who's Afraid Of The Big Bad Jinx?"	Guy Scarpitta	Al Schwartz & Lou Huston	May 4, 1965	6429
Lately, bad things have been happening to people whenever Uncle Joe is around. Betty Jo loses her voice. Mr. Harrington (Jack Pepper) gets fired. Sam's printing press breaks down. The Cannonball rides off the tracks. Fred Ziffel's new well dries up. Joe is now getting the reputation of being a jinx. Joe is initially upset by all the talk of him being a jinx. But then he decides to offer his services as a jinx for a fee. Sam hires Joe to jinx Crabwell Corners so they don't get the new box factory. Then hopefully it will instead come to Hooterville. As hard as Joe tries, the factory still winds up going to Crabwell Corners. Kate says that proves that Joe is not a jinx. But, could there be another jinx at the Shady Rest and could it be Dog? William Fawcett as Pip Winslow. Note: Pat Woodell does not appear in this episode.
69	31	"The Chicken Killer"	Richard L. Bare	Al Schwartz & Lou Huston	May 11, 1965	6431
Hinky Mittenfloss (Percy Helton), the new dog catcher, is constantly trying to catch Dog. That night, Betty Jo is worried because Dog hasn't come home. Hinky tells Betty Jo that he believes that Dog killed three of Luther Craig's (Guy Wilkerson) chickens. Dog comes home covered in chicken feathers. Hinky takes Dog to the County Dog Pound where he will eventually be put down. Kate, Betty Jo and Uncle Joe consult with lawyer Melvin Randall (Walter Reed). Melvin thinks that Kate is more than capable of handling the case before a judge. Though hesitant at first, Judge Murdock allows the case to proceed. Hinky calls Luther Craig as his first witness. With the help of a cat, Arnold the pig and Dog, Kate almost wins the case. But Dog grabbing Joe's chicken sandwich seals his fate. That is until Betty Jo wakes up from her dream. Note: Jeannine Riley, Pat Woodell, Smiley Burnette and Rufe Davis do not appear in this episode.
70	32	"Why Girls Leave Home"	Richard L. Bare	Story by : John Bradford; Teleplay by : Jay Sommers, Howard Harris & John Bradford	May 18, 1965	6432
Music Professor Lieberschmit (Sig Ruman) recommends that would-be singer Bobbie Jo go to New York City for three months to take singing lessons. Kate and Sam figure out how much money Bobbie Jo will need in New York. Kate barely manages to borrow $300 for Bobbie Jo's trip from Mr. Guerney at the bank by using her engagement ring as collateral. Billie Jo announces that her secretarial school is giving her a chance for a secretarial job at a Hollywood studio. Along with the job there is also the possibility of a screen test. Billie Jo just needs money to get there. Kate is able to get an extra $100 from Mr. Gurney. Then Betty Jo announces that she has received a Phys-Ed scholarship at a school in New Hampshire. Kate figures that only one girl can go and now has to decide which one. Kate goes back and forth in her mind over which one it will be. But before Kate can pick one, the girls decide Billie Jo should be the one. Billie Jo says she has fallen for a boy named Neil Greely and that Bobbie Jo should go. Bobbie Jo says it will cost too much in New York and that Betty Jo should go. Betty Jo says she found out it's an all girl school and doesn't want to go. Note: Smiley Burnette and Rufe Davis are credited but do not appear in this episode.
71	33	"There's No Stove Like an Old Stove"	Richard L. Bare	Allan Manings & Hugh Wedlock, Jr.	May 25, 1965	6433
Uncle Joe is fed up with chopping wood for Kate's old wood-burning stove. Joe tells Kate that people have stopped coming to the hotel because the old stove is ruining her cooking. Joe sabotages the old stove. Kate gets a letter from New York food critic Lucius J. Penrose (veteran English stage and screen character actor Alan Mowbray). Apparently Joe wrote Penrose and asked him to come to the hotel to taste Kate's cooking. With a new oven and Penrose's stamp of approval, the hotel could be famous. The old stove starts smoking and Joe tells Kate he has already ordered a new one. Meanwhile in New York, Penrose tells a Chef (Grady Sutton) that he hated his meal. Kate tries to stop Floyd and Charley from delivering the new stove, but it's too late. Another problem is that the electric stove has to be put together. The stove is finally together, but there are pieces left over. When they plug it in, the power goes out. Penrose arrives and is not impressed with the hotel or the stove. He says that the only reason he agreed to come was to get a meal cooked on an old-fashioned wood-burning stove. Kate winds up cooking the meal in the Cannonball's wood burner and Penrose loves it. Note: Jeannine Riley does not appear in this episode.
72	34	"The Brontosaurus Caper"	Richard L. Bare	Howard Merrill & Stan Dreben	June 1, 1965	6434
Betty Jo is giving up baseball to devote her life to science. The family finds out that she has a crush on Roland Barrett, her new science teacher. Dog brings home a large animal bone, which Betty Jo takes to Roland. Roland is very interested in the bone and would like to find out where Dog got it from. Betty Jo invites Roland over for dinner. Meanwhile, the Pixley museum has been closed for repairs. Dog sneaks in and steals bones from the baby brontosaurus skeleton. That evening, Roland comes by the hotel and Billie Jo finds him attractive as well. Dog brings home another bone and Roland believes they could be from a brontosaurus. The family starts to believe the bones are buried below the hotel. Kate is not thrilled when they start digging a hole in the lobby floor. The family has to sleep outside in tents. Clarence McGill (Ken Drake), curator for the Pixley museum, comes to the Shady Rest. Clarence caught Dog sneaking in and stealing the bones. After Roland elopes with the gym teacher, Betty Jo is interested in baseball again. Jonathan Hole as Mr. Earnshaw. Note: Pat Woodell, Smiley Burnette and Rufe Davis do not appear in this episode.
73	35	"The Hairbrained Scheme"	Guy Scarpitta	Bernie Kahn & Lila Garrett	June 8, 1965	6435
Uncle Joe gets his friends Sam, Charley and Floyd to invest $15 in his latest get-rich-quick scheme. He wants to make the town a fisherman's paradise by stocking the creek with fish. But then they find out Joe would stock it with saltwater halibut. Kate makes him give back the money, and also makes him promise no more schemes. Joe runs into his simpleminded friend Hector (Robert Easton). Hector tells him that his hair has been growing like crazy since he started drinking his goat's milk. Joe buys the goat and hopes to get rich selling the goat milk to bald men. Joe tells Kate that the goat is a present for her. The goat starts to destroy things around the hotel and Kate wants to get rid of it. Despite his promise to Kate, Joe tells her about selling the goat milk as a baldness cure. Kate comes up with a plan to teach Joe a lesson and she gets Sam and Floyd to help her. Later, Hector comes by and shows Joe a halibut he caught in the creek. Note: Pat Woodell does not appear in this episode.
74	36	"There's No Business With Show Business"	Richard L. Bare	George O'Hanlon & Charles Tannen	June 15, 1965	6436
Their latest traveling salesman guest sneaks out of the hotel without paying his bill. Kate and Uncle Joe find a guidebook for traveling salesmen listing certain hotels that can be scammed. Joe's name is mentioned as an easy mark and it says they should avoid owner Kate Bradley. Harry Harmon (George O'Hanlon), the owner of a traveling circus, has a similar guidebook. He plans to con Joe into letting the flat-broke circus troupe take up lodging at Shady Rest. Harry works on Joe's ego and convinces him that he can help the circus get better. Harry claims he'll pay for 5 rooms and then he sneaks in the rest of his performers. Mr. Haley (Charles Tannen), one of the performers, comes in with a seal and Kate is not happy. Kate becomes suspicious when more food is being consumed than should be, and she hasn't seen any money yet. She thinks she sees people that haven't registered, but they're always gone before she can show them to Joe. Kate tells Joe to ask Harry for some money. Harry finds a way to not pay just yet. Kate finds Harry's guidebook. The entire circus is practicing in the lobby. The girls and Dog are getting involved. Kate realizes that she has been taken and kicks everyone out. After everyone is gone, Kate finds that many things are stolen and they forgot the seal. Iris Adrian as Mary Sills. Don Megowan as Freddie. Felix Silla as Baron Munchin. Note: This episode is the last one to be filmed in black-and-white and the last one where Jeannine Riley plays Billie Jo and Pat Woodell plays Bobbie Jo. Smiley Burnette and Rufe Davis do not appear in this episode.

=== Season 3 (1965–66) ===
All episodes from Season 3 onwards filmed in color.

Jeannine Riley and Pat Woodell leave the series and Gunilla Hutton plays Billie Jo and Lori Saunders plays Bobbie Jo.

No. overall	No. in season	Title	Directed by	Written by	Original release date	Prod. code
75	1	"Dear Minerva"	Richard L. Bare	Al Schwartz & Lou Huston	September 14, 1965	6501
Sam has added an advice column called Dear Minerva to the newspaper, and Sam is Minerva. Kate thinks that the column should be written by a woman. Sam convinces Kate to be Minerva as long as no one knows it's her. Kate has a hard time writing the column in the hotel without anyone finding out. Kate has Dog deliver her columns to Sam. The column becomes a big hit, but writing it and taking care of things at the hotel takes its toll on Kate. One night, Billie Jo and Bobbie Jo hear Kate typing in the kitchen. Billie Jo thinks she might be writing to a secret lover. Sam gets a call from a large newspaper that wants to syndicate the Dear Minerva column. He writes a note about it to Kate. The girls intercept the note and, misunderstanding what Sam wrote, they believe Sam and Kate are in love. They tell Uncle Joe and wonder why Kate has been hiding it. They write to Minerva and ask her advice. "Minerva" eases the girls' concerns and announces that this is her last column. Note: This episode is the first one to be filmed in color and the first one where Gunilla Hutton plays Billie Jo and Lori Saunders plays Bobbie Jo.
76	2	"The Baffling Raffle"	Richard L. Bare	Howard Harris & Arthur Marx	September 21, 1965	6502
Oliver Wendell Douglas and Lisa Douglas are staying overnight at the hotel. They are moving into their newly purchased farmhouse, the run-down Haney place. Kate and the girls are surprised that anyone would buy that farm. When Joe finds out that Oliver is a lawyer, he wants to ask him how to get out of jury duty. Oliver inadvertently gives Joe an idea and Joe gets Kate to take his place. Joe finds out that he won a television set in a raffle, but he has to claim it by noon tomorrow. Joe and the girls tear the hotel apart trying to find the ticket. Then he remembers it's in the suitcase that Kate took to Pixley. Joe has Charley and Floyd take him to Pixley. As hard as he tries, Joe can't get a message to a sequestered Kate. Joe even tries to get Dog to give Kate a message. Joe falls down the chimney of the jury room. He gets thrown out before he can talk to Kate. Kate does come home in time, but something else prevents Joe from claiming his prize. Ray Kellogg as Henry the Bailiff. Sidney Clute as Waiter. Dan White as 1st Juror. Guest stars from Green Acres: Eddie Albert as Oliver Douglas and Eva Gabor as Lisa Douglas
77	3	"The Dog Turns Playboy"	Charles Barton	Al Schwartz & Lou Huston	September 28, 1965	6503
Betty Jo and Bobbie Jo and a group of friends are trying to plan a fund-raising stage production to buy some playground equipment for the kids. They're holding the meeting in Sam's store and he's getting annoyed. They're also having trouble casting the female lead. Because of something Sam says, Betty Jo comes up with an idea. They'll rewrite the play for an all canine cast with Dog in the lead. Lawyer Arthur Bronson (William Lanteau) arrives at the hotel. He informs them that a former guest of the hotel, Mr. Kroger, who has just passed away, has left $200 to Dog. Kate will be executor for Dog. Sam puts Dog's story and picture on the front page of the paper. Dog is generous to his friends, and wants to buy them things. Everyone except Uncle Joe. But Dog is letting the money and fame go to his head. He keeps looking at his picture in the paper. Joe asks Oliver Douglas if there were any way to break the will. Dog befriends Oliver's girl puppy and misses several play rehearsals. Kate tells Dog he has no money left. Now Oliver's puppy wants nothing to do with him. It's the night of the show and Dog is late. Despite that, the play is a success. Paul De Rolf as Jeff. Henry Z Jones, Jr. as Herbert. Joseph Mell as Butcher. Guest star from Green Acres: Eddie Albert as Oliver Douglas Note: Smiley Burnette and Rufe Davis do not appear in this episode.
78	4	"The Good Luck Ring"	Richard L. Bare	Howard Harris & Arthur Marx	October 5, 1965	6504
Kate is at Sam's store and wants to buy a dictionary for Bobbie Jo. Bobbie Jo is entering an upcoming spelling bee. It may be a losing battle against stuck up but excellent speller Henrietta Watson. Cora Watson (Elvia Allman), Henrietta's equally stuck up mother, protests Sam's appointment as judge. She feels he will be biased in favor of Bobbie Jo. As such, Oliver Douglas, is appointed the new judge. Bobbie Jo doesn't have the confidence to win, until she finds a scarab ring. Now it seems she is flooded with good luck and she has no trouble spelling. Slowly, the family begins to believe in the power of the ring when they too get what they want when wearing it. After finally beating Sam at checkers, Uncle Joe loses the ring. Joe goes to see Mr. Carter (Ollie O'Toole) at the Pixley jewelry store and buys an imitation ring. Kate and the girls leave for the spelling bee. Joe finds the real ring in a bag of groceries he bought at Sam's store. Joe gets to the contest when it's down to Bobbie Jo and Henrietta. There is some confusion when Joe tries to give Bobbie Jo the real ring. After winning the spelling bee, Bobbie Jo realizes she still had the imitation ring. Byron Foulger as Mr. Guerney at the Bank. Guest stars from Green Acres: Eddie Albert as Oliver Douglas and Eva Gabor as Lisa Douglas
79	5	"Joe Carson, General Contractor"	Charles Barton	Al Schwartz & Lou Huston	October 12, 1965	6505
With Dog's help, the family decides on the color that the hotel will be painted. Uncle Joe is supposed to do the painting. He finds out that the wealthy Douglases are looking for a contractor to help fix up the "Green Acres" farmhouse. Joe gets the idea that he can go into business as a general contractor. Although Joe knows nothing about construction work, he does get Lisa Douglas to hire him. Joe thinks he can get subcontractors to do the actual work. Sam tells Joe he will need a contractors license. Joe tries to juggle the hotel and the Douglas jobs. Joe also finds that he may be thinking rich, but cash poor. He needs to find some additional capital to get both jobs going. Kate wants to know why Floyd is practicing to paint the hotel and why Joe hasn't bought the paint yet. Kate finds things missing from the hotel and learns they are at the Douglas house. Oliver asks Lisa how she could have hired Joe. Kate comes up with a plan to set Uncle Joe straight. Guest stars from Green Acres: Eddie Albert as Oliver Douglas and Eva Gabor as Lisa Douglas
80	6	"Bobbie Jo's Sorority"	Guy Scarpitta	Al Schwartz & Lou Huston	October 26, 1965	6506
Bobbie Jo is very excited because she has been nominated for membership into Hooterville High's only sorority. No one in the family is that excited. She is worried as she knows many girls who were nominated but didn't pass the initiation. The head of the sorority, Henrietta Watson, doesn't want Bobbie Jo in the sorority. She is still mad because Bobbie Jo beat her in the spelling bee. She devises what she believes is an impossible initiation task for Bobbie Jo. Bobbie Jo must get a date with the school's star athlete, Stonewall Jackson, who is only interested in sports and not girls. Billie Jo thinks her feminine charms can get Bobbie Jo a date with Stonewall. But that doesn't work. Kate comes up with the idea that Bobbie Jo should have Betty Jo teach her some things about sports. Bobbie Jo is still not sure she can pull it off. Bobbie Jo and Stonewall are on the Cannonball, but she can't bring herself to talk to him. Bobbie Jo does get a date with Stonewall. She borrows a dress from Lisa Douglas. Betty Jo tells Kate that Stonewall asked Bobbie Jo for the date right in front of Henrietta. Bobbie Jo and Stonewall spend their date at the gym. Bobbie Jo gets her membership. Bobbie Jo also has a way to get back at Henrietta for the difficult initiation task. Guest star: Bobby Pickett; Guest stars from Green Acres: Eddie Albert as Oliver Douglas and Eva Gabor as Lisa Douglas
81	7	"A Doctor in the House"	Hollingsworth Morse	Frank Crow	November 2, 1965	6507
Kate finds out that Uncle Joe answered an ad in a medical journal from a Dr. Mathew Bailey. Dr. Bailey is looking for office space in return for free medical service. Kate doesn't think it's a good idea, especially with everyone in Hooterville going to see Doc Stuart (Frank Ferguson). The girls are very impressed with the young and handsome doctor. They beg Kate to let him stay. They open up an office for Dr. Bailey next to the hotel lobby. Unfortunately, no one comes to see the Doctor. Joe and the girls go around and try to get patients, but nothing works. Doc Stuart unwittingly gives Kate an idea on how to boost Bailey's standing as a doctor. Kate pretends to be injured. Word spreads and the extent of her injury gets exaggerated. Kate is disappointed when Doc Stuart shows up instead of Bailey. She gets Doc Stuart to help her with her plan. Bailey finally comes by and knows she's faking. Doc Stuart spreads the word that Bailey cured Kate and he starts to get patients. Elsie Baker as townswoman. Dave Willock as Touhey Benson. Guest star from Green Acres: Eddie Albert as Oliver Douglas
82	8	"Hooterville A-Go-Go"	Charles Barton	Charles Tannen & George O'Hanlon	November 9, 1965	6508
The Every Other Wednesday Afternoon Discussion Club is planning on holding a square dance as a high school benefit. The Bradley girls decide to try and get King Ring a Ding, the big rock 'n' roll star, to perform at the benefit instead. It's time for the club meeting and new member Lisa Douglas shows up with Oliver. Everyone insists that Oliver stay for the meeting. Tillie Finney (Maudie Prickett) keeps interrupting the meeting. Oliver sneaks out. The girls write King Ring a Ding a letter asking him to perform at the benefit. Reece Garrett (Milton Frome), King Ring a Ding's manager, wants to dismiss the letter. King Ring a Ding, whose real name is Herbie Willits, says he used to live in Hooterville. It was Kate who encouraged him to become a singer. Herbie shows up at the hotel. Kate is thrilled to see Herbie and remembers the songs he used to sing. She also mentions how she doesn't like King Ring a Ding's style of music. Kate wants Herbie to sing at the benefit. What Kate and the girls don't realize is that Herbie is King Ring a Ding and he doesn't tell them. Herbie overhears that no tickets have been sold mainly because he's the "headliner". Herbie tries to tell the girls that he's King Ring a Ding, but they don't believe him. Uncle Joe sends a telegram to King Ring a Ding calling him a bum. Herbie has a plan and sends Joe a telegram. Joe does something that almost ruins the benefit. It's takes some time, but King Ring a Ding finally shows up to the benefit. Kate learns that Herbie is King Ring a Ding. Guest stars from Green Acres: Eddie Albert as Oliver Douglas and Eva Gabor as Lisa Douglas Songs: "Live It Up" and "Red River Valley", both sung by guest star Ray Hemphill. "Steam, Cinders and Smoke", sung by Smiley Burnette and Rufe Davis
83	9	"Hooterville Hurricane"	Stanley Z. Cherry	David Braverman & Bob Marcus	November 16, 1965	6509
Uncle Joe is trying to fix the bathtub and he causes more damage than repairs. Kate tells him to get a plumber. Boxer Kid Dynamite is offering $100 to anyone who can stay in the ring with him for three rounds. Joe hopes to find a fighter who he can train, while keeping the majority of the prize money as a training fee. He thinks he's found that person in Herman Crawley, the plumber Kate hires. Herman is quite strong and can take a hit to the head without feeling it. Joe sets up a makeshift boxing ring outside the hotel to train Herman and Kate is not happy. Kate is also upset because Herman is going to eat them out of house and home. Kid Dynamite and his manager mother Mrs. Hogan (Marjorie Bennett) come to the hotel. Mrs. Hogan and Joe trade insults. One thing leads to another and Dynamite hits Herman in the head and hurts his hand. Joe thinks there's no way Herman can lose. So Joe makes a $500 against the hotel side wager with Mrs. Hogan on the outcome. Joe learns that Herman has a weakness. When Kate elbows Herman in the stomach, he goes down. Because of something Betty Jo says, Joe thinks he knows Dynamite's weakness. It's time for the fight. It gets tense a couple times, but Herman lasts the 3 rounds. Mr. Finchcliff (Joe Higgins), from the County Bureau, arrives. The fight is not as profitable as it should have been, because they failed to get a license. Herman Hack as Timekeeper.
84	10	"Betty Jo Goes to New York"	Guy Scarpitta	Al Schwartz & Lou Huston	November 23, 1965	6510
Lisa Douglas asks an excited Betty Jo to go along with her on a week long trip to New York City, all expenses paid. Kate is against the idea, but then gives in. Bobbie Jo is sad that she isn't going. When Betty Jo returns to Hooterville she's a changed person. She's dressed fancy, acting snooty and she's putting on airs. She complains about the small size of the Shady Rest. Betty Jo talks about the sophisticated young man she met, Gregory Tremayne. She acts as though country life is beneath her. Betty Jo has been skipping her chores to go visit with Lisa. Betty Jo tells the family that Gregory is coming for a visit. Kate believes Lisa is to blame for Betty Jo's new snooty attitude, but quickly realizes that she isn't. Kate does get some help from Lisa for the upcoming visit by Gregory. Gregory arrives and he's immediately insulting and condescending. Betty Jo has had enough and tells Gregory off. After he leaves, Betty Jo realizes she had been acting the same way. Guest stars from Green Acres: Eddie Albert as Oliver Douglas and Eva Gabor as Lisa Douglas
85	11	"Bedloe's Successor"	Stanley Z. Cherry	Al Schwartz & Lou Huston	November 30, 1965	6511
Kate has a feeling that something bad is going to happen. Homer Bedloe (Charles Lane), arch-enemy of the Hooterville Cannonball, returns in abject disgrace and poverty to Hooterville. Bedloe is looking for somewhere to stay, at least for a little while. He has been fired and replaced by Wilbur Goodfellow (Donald Curtis). Bedloe says that Goodfellow is the exact opposite of him in every way. Goodfellow arrives and wants Bedloe to leave. Goodfellow tells Kate that he's here to inspect the spur line and the Cannonball. Bedloe begs Kate to let him stay and he'll even work for his keep. After his inspection, Goodfellow plans to make major investments into the line. Everyone is excited by all this news. What no one knows is that Bedloe is still in charge and he is working with Goodfellow. Bedloe is upset that things are doing better in the valley and the hotel is full. Bedloe comes up with another plan. Goodfellow tells Kate that he plans to send the Cannonball in for a refit and to loan a new locomotive as a temporary replacement. Kate and the girls want to throw a party to celebrate. Bedloe intends to melt the Cannonball down for scrap. After Kate goes to the cinema in Pixley, she discovers the whole thing is a scam and that Bedloe and Goodfellow are working together. Kate threatens to tell Norman Curtis what Bedloe did and he leaves. William Bakewell as an actor in the movie.
86	12	"The Crowded Wedding Ring"	Stanley Z. Cherry	Ben Starr	December 7, 1965	6512
One of Kate's old boyfriends named Ralph Denton (Whit Bissell) sends a telegram stating that he is coming by the hotel for a few days. Uncle Joe thinks Kate is acting just a little too nonchalantly, which means she still has feelings for him. Ralph shows up with his overbearing and busybody spinster sister, Mabel (Hope Summers). Mabel won't let Ralph make a move without her OK. That night, the girls lock Mabel in her room to give Ralph and Kate some alone time. But she somehow gets out. Ralph asks Kate to go fishing the next day and Mabel says she'll go with. Joe finds a way to have Mabel go with him to Sam's store. Kate and Ralph are able to go fishing. Floyd and Charley pretend there's something wrong with the Cannonball to keep Joe and Mabel from getting back to the hotel. The girls get Ralph and Kate into another romantic setting. Ralph is about to say something to Kate when Mabel returns. For days now, Joe has been keeping Mabel busy. Ralph talks to Joe about marriage and thinks he's going to ask for Kate's hand. Ralph announces the upcoming wedding of Joe and Mabel. Mabel and Joe realize they're not in love and forget about the wedding.
87	13	"Uncle Joe Plays Post Office"	Stanley Z. Cherry	Al Schwartz & Lou Huston	December 14, 1965	6513
Uncle Joe insults Sam about the way he runs the post office. Sam gets so upset that he tells Joe to take over. Joe decides to set up the post office at the hotel's reception desk. Kate wants Joe to take everything back. Joe thinks that the post office will bring in customers for the hotel. Kate begs Sam to take the post office, but he refuses. Joe tries to gather the equipment he needs to run the post office, even if it means confiscating what he needs in the name of the federal government. Customers treat the new post office like it was still in Drucker's Store, wanting to buy groceries. Kate finds most of the hotel's food missing. Kate once again begs Sam to take the post office back, but he says no. Oliver Douglas has a very frustrating time trying to mail a letter. Kate finds a way for Joe to have to move the post office out of the hotel lobby. But this backfires when Joe moves it to Kate's bedroom. She kicks Joe out. Joe talks Charley and Floyd into helping deliver the mail. Charley writes Postal Inspector Mr. Wickersham (Damian O'Flynn) and he sends Mr. Browning to Hooterville. Browning puts the post office back in Sam's store. Guest star from Green Acres: Eddie Albert as Oliver Douglas
88	14	"What's a Trajectory?"	Stanley Z. Cherry	Fred Fox & Irving Elinson	December 21, 1965	6514
Kate tells Floyd and Charley that it's been nearly a month since there have been any guests at the hotel. But then a Mr. Reynolds (Arthur O'Connell) checks in. When Kate says she didn't hear the train, Reynolds tells her he walked all the way from Stuben's Bluff. Uncle Joe walks Reynolds to the room, but has the wrong key. Reynolds is able to open the door with the key. Joe doesn't trust Reynolds. Kate and the girls think he's a nice, friendly man. Mr. Reynolds pays in cash and reserves the entire hotel so he won't be disturbed. Joe tries to subtly learn more about Reynolds, but gets no information. Joe hears from Sam that the Benton Bank was recently robbed of $3,000. Joe's certain Reynolds is the robber. Sam tells Joe he better be sure or Joe could be sued for libel. Joe wants to get Reynolds' picture and collect the $500 reward. The pictures don't turn out. Joe offers Sam, Floyd and Charley half of the reward if they help him capture Reynolds. Joe handcuffs Reynolds to the elevator. Betty Jo hears over the radio that the robber has been captured. But before Joe can apologize to Reynolds, he is mysteriously gone and he left more money. Kate sees in the paper a picture of Reynolds. He's really a scientist named Dr. William Lawrence and he helped launch a new rocket.
89	15	"The Butler Did It"	Dick Moder	Al Schwartz & Lou Huston	December 28, 1965	6515
Kate discovers the labels from the cans in her pantry are missing. Apparently, Bobbie Jo and Betty Jo are entering various contests where they are required to send in food can and box top labels. Bobbie Jo manages to win the contest sponsored by Gibney's Old English Tomato Sauce. The first prize being a traditional English butler for one month. Unannounced, their new butler Faversham (Maurice Dallimore), arrives on their doorstep. Things are awkward when Kate tries to eat breakfast in bed. Joe gets Faversham to do his chores. Kate stops the girls from taking Faversham to school with them. Kate tries, but she just can't get used to giving up control of the chores around the hotel. Looking for something to do, Kate goes to Sam's store and starts to clean. Uncle Joe turns the hotel into a bit of old London and puts an ad in the paper. Joe even plans a Saturday morning fox hunt. Joe has a hard time finding a fox so he buys a raccoon from Newt Kiley (Kay E. Kuter). The girls are worried about the raccoon. Dog lets the raccoon out of its cage. There's quite a crowd for the fox hunt and Joe finds the raccoon missing. Joe wants to use Dog as a fox and things go very wrong. As Faversham is about to leave, the girls learn they won another contest.
90	16	"Better Never Than Late"	Stanley Z. Cherry	Ben Starr	January 4, 1966	6516
Billie Jo tells Kate that she wants to quit secretarial school, but Kate won't let her. Kate figures out that Billie Jo wants to earn some money. Uncle Joe decides to let hotel guests know they can hire Billie Jo as a stenographer. Joe tries to talk Mr. Grant (Vinton Hayworth) and Mr. Billings (Harry Harvey Sr.) into hiring Billie Jo, but they're not interested. Salesman Mr. Norton (Herbert Anderson) does hire her. He wants to write a business letter to a Frank Mortimer. Norton dictates a scathing letter because Mortimer reneged on an order. But Norton decides not to send the letter until he returns to his office. When he gets to the office he learns that Mortimer has come through with his large order. Norton can't find the letter. He returns to the Shady Rest to see if he left the letter there. They all learn that Joe found the letter and had Dog take it to Sam's store. It takes forever for Kate to find out from Sam that the letter has already left for Pixley. Because of absent minded Floyd, the Cannonball runs out of wood. The family finally gets to Pixley and the post office is closed. It takes some doing to get Pixley postmaster Foley (Vaughn Taylor) to open the office. When he realizes the key is in the post office, Foley calls locksmith Tad Fiskee (Herbie Faye). There's a lot of confusion when they try to get Fiskee out of a movie theater. They finally get into the post office only to find the mail had already left. But a good hearted Floyd ultimately comes to the rescue.
91	17	"Betty Jo Catches the Bouquet"	Dick Moder	Al Schwartz & Lou Huston	January 11, 1966	6517
Gladys Knockleheimer and Bernie McKenzie are holding their wedding reception at the hotel. They are the fifth set of friends of Billie Jo's that have gotten married recently. Both Billie Jo and Bobbie Jo are excited by the idea of getting married, but Betty Jo is not interested. Betty Jo wants to go play baseball, but Kate makes her stay. When Betty Jo catches Gladys' bouquet, she is terrified that she will be next to get married. Kate decides it's time to have a talk with her about the issue, but Kate really doesn't explain things well. Later, Betty Jo asks Kate how one picks a husband. Betty Jo misinterprets her mother's advice and starts going around and asking boys to marry her. Mrs. Jessop (Winnie Coffin), Mrs. Hennessy and Wilma Blodgett complain to Kate about Betty Jo asking their sons to marry her. Betty Jo overhears Billie Jo and Bobbie Jo tell Kate about all the boys that are interested in them. Betty Jo then receives gifts from a secret admirer. Uncle Joe tries to find out who the admirer is. Kate discovers it was Betty Jo sending gifts to herself because she didn't want to appear to have no one interested in her. Joe brings Larry (Paul De Rolf) to the hotel, mistakenly thinking he was the secret admirer. Larry is attracted to Betty Jo and she to him. Charles Briles as Doug Keefer.
92	18	"Billie Jo's Independence Day"	Dick Moder	Al Schwartz & Lou Huston	January 18, 1966	6518
Billie Jo wants to move out of the hotel and into her own apartment in Pixley. It would make for a smaller commute to school and there are more eligible men there. Kate repeatedly says no. The sisters try to help Billie Jo, but it doesn't work. Kate finally gives in, but she has to approve of the place and the landlord. She only agreed because she believes there is not an apartment to be found in Pixley. However, Billie Jo finds a place that meets Kate's standards. Kate even knows Martha Griffin (Minerva Urecal), the landlord. It's been several days and the girls decide to visit Billie Jo. Billie Jo tells her sisters that she loves her independence, even though all the comforts of home are not quite there. The girls decide to spend the night. The next day the girls ask Kate when they could have their own apartment. Billie Jo comes by with her laundry. When Kate says she'll charge her to do the wash, Billie Jo says she'll do them herself. While Billie Jo is at school, Kate comes by to clean the apartment. Charley and Floyd come by with groceries that Sam donated. It's not long before Billie Jo becomes homesick and finds a way to come back.
93	19	"Yogurt, Anyone?"	Dick Moder	Clifford Goldsmith	January 25, 1966	6519
High-schooler Betty Jo has a fight with her latest boyfriend Edward. He believes Betty Jo is intellectually immature. Meanwhile, Uncle Joe is collecting loose pieces of string to roll into one really big ball. Betty Jo tells Kate that Edward wanted to go to a debate Saturday night and she wanted to go to a basketball game. The girls are heading off to school. Kate gives Betty Jo some books to mail from Sam's place to a college girl that stayed at the hotel. On the Cannonball, Betty Jo meets an older college boy named Chuck, who is visiting relatives in Hooterville. Chuck believes Betty Jo is an Emily Dickinson College girl, because of the college books she was to mail. She lets him believe she's a college girl. Betty Jo reads up on what college girls dress like and how they act. And apparently college girls eat yogurt to keep them trim. Betty Jo has Charley and Floyd find her some. Betty Jo is getting ready for her date with Chuck by putting on very long fake eyelashes. Edward feels bad about what happened and comes by to take Betty Jo to the movies. Then Chuck shows up. Betty Jo gets Bobby Jo to go out with Edward. Things don't go well and the girls wind up switching dates. Guest star from Green Acres: Eddie Albert as Oliver Douglas
94	20	"Only Boy in the Class"	Guy Scarpitta	Al Schwartz & Lou Huston	February 1, 1966	6520
It's the start of the new semester at Hooterville High and there are seven new girls and one new boy enrolled. Bobbie Jo tells Kate about the new boy, Walter Thorp. He's good looking and very athletic. Bobbie Jo takes pity on Walter as he is the only boy in her home economics class. Things are awkward for Walter in the class and Bobbie Jo helps him out. She invites him over for dinner. To make Walter feel better, Betty Jo tells him what it was like for her when she was the only girl that tried out for the baseball team. After something that Kate said, Bobbie Jo and Betty Jo try to get someone to switch classes with Walter. They tell Kate that it took a lot of people switching classes, but they got Walter out of home economics. But Kate ruins their plan when she makes Bobbie Jo transfer out of archeology class. There is an upcoming home economics test. Each student is to prepare a full dinner for one's imaginary spouse's imaginary boss in twenty minutes. The girls help Walter practice making the meal and Uncle Joe is timing it. Things do not go well. Kate comes up with a way to help Walter get a passing grade. Guest star: Bobby Pickett
95	21	"The County Fair"	Hollingsworth Morse	Lila Garrett & Bernie Kahn	February 8, 1966	6521
Despite being a 7 time winner, Kate tells Uncle Joe she will not be entering the cake baking contest at the annual county fair. Kate reconsiders when Joe tells her that her arch enemy Cora Watson will probably win then. Betty Jo picks Everett the pig for Hooterville High's cutest livestock contest. Bobbie Jo will be singing in the talent contest. Joe hopes to win all the prizes at the baseball throwing booth. While practicing, Joe breaks a hotel window. Sam tries guessing what kind of cake Kate is going to make. She wanted to keep it a secret, but she tells him. Joe kicks a salesman, who really wanted a room, out of the hotel because Joe thought he wanted to find out what Kate was baking. Betty Jo panics when Everett becomes very lethargic. It seems that Everett only perks up when Bobbie Jo is singing. When word gets out that she's going to sing for a pig, an embarrassed Bobbie Jo says she won't do it. Joe, Sam, Charley and Floyd try singing for Everett, but it doesn't work. Betty Jo finds a way to get Bobbie Jo to sing for Everett and Kate burns her cake. Kate improvises and comes up with a very interesting cake. At the fair, they learn that the livestock contest and the talent contest will be at the same time. Joe manages to ruin Kate's cake with his lousy throwing. Betty Jo figures out how Bobbie Jo can be in two places at the same time. Kate gets even with Joe. Betty Jo and Bobbie Jo both win their contests. Tim Rooney as Douglas. Paul De Rolf as Bruce. Guest star from Green Acres: Pat Buttram as Mr. Haney
96	22	"Jury at the Shady Rest"	Charles Barton	Al Schwartz & Lou Huston	February 15, 1966	6522
An accident at the county courthouse has blown off the roof of the building. Uncle Joe finds a way to get the Pixley Hotel to turn away the jury of the current case. He then talks Sheriff Blake (Emory Parnell) into having the jury sequestered at the Shady Rest. But things don't run as smoothly as Joe had hoped. They have to figure out sleeping assignments considering the shortage of rooms. It also seems as though the gluttonous jurors refuse to reach a verdict because they like Kate's food so much. Bailiff Vince Tucker (Parley Baer) makes some of the hotel off limits for the family when the jury is in a room. Kate and the girls are getting worn out from the extra work. Then a baby in the hotel complicates things further. Some of the jurors animals invade the hotel. With the Judges help, Kate finds a way to have the jurors leave.
97	23	"The Invisible Mr. Dobble"	Charles Barton	Al Schwartz & Lou Huston	February 22, 1966	6523
Kate receives a letter from a Mr. Donald Dobble requesting a reservation for two rooms for him and a friend. Mr. Dobble's friend, David Benton (Frank Aletter), arrives and acts as though Dobble were with him. But Kate sees no one but Mr. Benton. Benton seems crazy as he sees and talks to an invisible man. Kate believes that Benton is probably overworked. Kate continually tries to sneak a peak at or speak directly to Mr. Dobble to no avail. The girls ask what Dobble looks like and Kate is very vague with her answer. There are signs that Dobble is in the hotel, but Kate still never sees him. When no one else seems concerned that they haven't seen Dobble, Kate starts to feel that she is the one going crazy. The girls start to worry about Kate, especially when they see her talking to no one. Sam tells Kate that Dobble is probably a figment of Benton's imagination. And through the power of suggestion, he's got her believing it. Kate asks Benton and Dobble to leave and to not worry about paying their bill. A Mr. Robinson (Russ Conway) comes by looking for Benton. It seems Benton defrauds hotels into getting free room and board with his invisible man scheme.
98	24	"It's Not the Principle, It's the Money"	Charles Barton	David Braverman & Bob Marcus	March 1, 1966	6524
Kate hopes to have a convention take place at the hotel. But, they are in competition with the Pixley Hotel, which has more modern conveniences. Kate decides to do a face lift of the hotel's rooms, with Uncle Joe doing most of the work. Meanwhile, Kate gets a letter telling her of a property tax increase of $6. She is relieved but Uncle Joe is very upset. Joe sends a scathing letter to J.C. Albright (Don Haggerty), of the tax review board, demanding the taxes be lowered. Albright decides to go to the Shady Rest to handle the problem personally. Kate tells Joe to clean the place up, while she and the girls go to get supplies. Joe instead makes the hotel look as shabby and run-down as possible to justify the tax decrease. Mr. Forbes (Don Keefer), the convention organizer, arrives and Joe mistakes him for J.C. Albright. Mr. Forbes decides against the Shady Rest for the convention. When Kate sees what Joe did to the hotel, she is furious. After fixing the hotel up again, J.C. Albright arrives and Joe thinks he's the convention organizer. Joe really talks up the hotel and Albright thinks business must be very good. Kate runs into Forbes and has him come back to the hotel. But Joe got a note saying Albright was coming back and he messes the place up again. Despite still losing the convention, they do get a refund on their taxes.
99	25	"War of the Hotels"	Charles Barton	Al Schwartz & Lou Huston	March 8, 1966	6525
The Shady Rest is full with guests. The girls were going to leave cause Uncle Joe wanted to rent their rooms, but Kate says no. Meanwhile, the Pixley Hotel is just about empty. The Pixley Hotel's unscrupulous owner, Murdock Sneep (J. Pat O'Malley), tells Kate that his hotel is also full. Sneep suggests to Kate that they merge their businesses. Kate declines as she knows how empty the Pixley Hotel is. An angry Sneep threatens to ruin Kate. He starts with an aggressive advertising campaign. Even the Cannonball is full of Pixley Hotel signs. Kate finds a sign on Shady Rest property. Sneep and Kate then both continue to one up the other. But soon both realize this no-holds-barred "hotel war" is costing each of them money. Sneep comes by and tells Kate he gives up and would like a room. But during the night, Sneep releases a lot of bees in the hotel. All the guests leave. That night, Joe and Charley release a skunk in the Pixley Hotel. It turns out someone else is capitalizing on their feud. The owner of the Crabwell Corners Hotel. Jack Bannon as Ed.
100	26	"The Windfall"	Charles Barton	Al Schwartz & Lou Huston	March 15, 1966	6526
The hotel is empty and bills are going unpaid. In order to get some money, Kate suggests Uncle Joe find a paying job. Joe appears to be looking for a job, but he does his best not to get one. Joe takes a break in an empty lot in Pixley with Dog. While there, Dog digs up a tin can full of money. Joe doesn't tell Kate about the money, because he wants to keep it. Joe fantasizes about being a rich big shot in New York. He gives the Hat Check Girl (Joyce Nizzari) a gold cane as a tip. Joe then leaves with some Showgirls. Dog makes him feel guilty, so Joe secretly pays off all of Kate's bills. Even though she doesn't know who to thank, Kate is surprised and happy. Because there will be future bills, Kate still wants Joe to get a job. Joe learns that the money was probably stolen from the Crabwell Corners Bank. Joe fantasizes that he and Dog are in jail. Joe takes what moneys left and returns it to the can. He then finds out that the stolen money was found somewhere else. But before he can get the money back, he hears that someone else's dog dug it up. Guy Wilkerson as Lud Watson. Christine Williams as First Showgirl. Phyllis Davis as Second Showgirl. Jack Perkins as Guard.
101	27	"Second Honeymoon"	Charles Barton	Danny Simon & Rick Mittleman	March 22, 1966	6527
Uncle Joe is excited by a letter from Jeff and Nancy Anderson (Stephen Dunne and Emmaline Henry). They honeymooned at the hotel and are planning on returning for their tenth wedding anniversary. Joe would like to market the hotel as a second honeymoon haven for past honeymooning guests. The girls suggest they hold a gala reunion. They send out invitations and all the invitees have to do is fill in the dates they will be staying. The plan doesn't work as every single couple turns them down. The Andersons arrive and are looking forward to a quiet second honeymoon. But Joe's constant attention and picture taking is starting to bother them. Kate wants the Andersons to have some privacy. Jeff and Nancy do what they can to avoid Joe. They tell Kate they want to leave early because of Joe. Kate promises the couple she'll get Joe to stop taking pictures. Kate tells Joe to apologize to them. Joe manages to get the happy couple arguing. Because of something they said earlier in the day, Joe finds a way to get them together again.
102	28	"Kate Sells the Hotel"	Charles Barton	Ray Allen	March 29, 1966	6528
Carter Deming is a writer and the only current guest at the hotel. He tells Kate that he gets ten times more work done at the hotel than he does in his own home in New York. Uncle Joe lets Kate know that the bank turned down her latest loan request. The girls are sad because now they won't be able to buy some things out of a new catalog they got. Deming overhears Kate say that she's never been able to make a go of the hotel and wishes she could get rid of it. Deming offers to buy the hotel from Kate. Not knowing about the possible deal, the girls imply that they'd love to live in New York City. When Deming offers Kate much more than the hotel is really worth, Kate reluctantly accepts his offer. Kate tells the girls that the hotel is sold and they are upset. Despite what they said, they don't want to move from the Shady Rest and Hooterville. The problem is that Kate verbally promised Deming that she wouldn't back out of the deal. Joe tries to figure out a way to have Deming want to back out. One plan uses Fred Ziffel's pigs. Joe tries a couple other things, but nothing works. Deming actually comes up with a very nice reason to not buy the hotel.
103	29	"Kate Bradley, Peacemaker"	Charles Barton	Story by : Poot Pray & Tom Koch; Teleplay by : Al Schwartz & Lou Huston	April 5, 1966	6529
The cheap refrigerator that Uncle Joe bought isn't working, so Kate sends him into Pixley to get some ice for the icebox. Floyd and Charley are having a fight over who is the boss of the Cannonball and then they have a fight over a missing apple. Because of this, Joe can't get to Pixley and Kate's food will spoil. Kate gets the two to patch things up, but then Joe says something and they start fighting again. Kate has Betty Jo bring in the analytical mind of Oliver Douglas to assist in convincing the two to make up, but that doesn't work. Floyd goes on strike and carries a picket sign saying Charley is unfair. Joe uses the hand car to get some ice and take the girls to school. The Cannonball strike continues and it's paralyzing the valley. Joe puts up signs about a "Stop The Strike" rally at the Shady Rest for that evening. Kate asks him how people will get to the hotel with the train not running. Floyd and Charley make up, but once again Joe does something to break them up again. Kate finally comes up with a way to get the two to be friends again. Hank Worden as Farmer. Guest star from Green Acres: Eddie Albert as Oliver Douglas
104	30	"Whatever Happened to Betty Jo?"	Guy Scarpitta	Al Schwartz & Lou Huston	April 12, 1966	6530
Kate is cleaning out the storage closet. She wants the family members to go through their belongings to see what can be thrown away. Uncle Joe thinks they should start an antique business with the junk. Everyone is around to help except Betty Jo, who should have been on the afternoon Cannonball run from school. Floyd and Charlie tell Kate that they saw Betty Jo that morning. She was all made up and had a suitcase. It looked like she was about to run away. Kate and the girls look for clues in Betty Jo's room. They find her diary, but Kate can't bring herself to read it. Dog finds a notebook that leads them to believe that Betty Jo might be thinking of eloping with the new boy in town, Peter Latimer (Charles Briles). Kate tells Sam what Betty Jo did. Betty Jo is actually just coaching baseball to Peter. They're in an out of the way location because Peter doesn't want anyone to know he's being coached by a girl. Kate visits Mrs. Latimer (Florence Lake) to tell her that their children have eloped. When Betty Jo and Peter come home, everyone finds out that they were worrying over nothing.
105	31	"Every Bachelor Should Have a Family"	Guy Scarpitta	Erna Lazarus	April 19, 1966	6532
Kate's widowed friend Vera Wilson (Molly Dodd) has been dating Ronnie Beckman (Hugh Beaumont in the first of three appearances on the show). He's a bookkeeper who moved to the valley five years ago. Kate wants to know when they're getting married. Vera says the relationship is going very slowly and she doesn't want to seem pushy. Kate says it's the woman who has to start the countdown to marriage. Kate runs into Ronnie on the Cannonball. He tells her that he's not sure about marriage as he has always been alone. Vera has two children and Ronnie's not sure if he's ready for a family life. Floyd thinks that Kate and Ronnie are sweet on each other. Ronnie decides to stay at the hotel to see how happy real family life can be. When they arrive, the sisters are fighting. Kate tells them they have to look like a happy family in front of Ronnie. Uncle Joe thinks Ronnie wants to marry Kate for her money, so he talks down family life. It's really hard for the girls to be constantly nice to each other. Kate tells Ronnie that they were putting up a front and that they often fight. Ronnie is glad, as it wouldn't be natural to be that nice all the time. Ronnie decides that he'll marry Vera.
106	32	"The Young Matchmakers"	Charles Barton	Story by : Dick Wesson & Joel Kane; Teleplay by : Al Schwartz & Lou Huston	April 26, 1966	6531
It seems that every night everyone, including Dog, has something to do except for Kate. The girls overhear Uncle Joe telling Kate that she needs to get out herself. The girls decide to try and find Kate an eligible bachelor. They first tell Kate that they're grown-up now and she doesn't need to take care of them. Bobbie Jo tells Kate she should go on a date. That direct approach doesn't work. Their next attempt fails as well. They then ask Lisa Douglas for her advice. Lisa suggests holding a lonely hearts club gathering at the hotel. Hubert Thatcher (Jack Collins), Clyde Rambo (Norman Leavitt) and Renfrew Willoughby show up at the hotel hoping to meet some women. The girls take the men to their rooms. It doesn't take long for Kate to find out why the men are there. Kate learns from Joe what each man doesn't like. She uses that to get each of the men to leave. The girls agree to not try to find a man for Kate. Jack Bannon as Betty Jo's Date. Paul De Rolf as Bobbie Jo's Date. Guest star from Green Acres: Eva Gabor as Lisa Douglas
107	33	"Hooterville Valley Project"	Charles Barton	Story by : Ronny Pearlman; Teleplay by : Al Schwartz & Lou Huston	May 3, 1966	6533
Uncle Joe is excited about a new state planning commission project for the valley. The plan is to dam up Bleeker Creek, which will create a new lake in the area. Joe thinks they'll be full with people wanting to use the lake. Kate points out to Joe that the location of the new lake does not mean that the hotel will be lakefront property. It will be under water in the middle of the lake. When she sees how this project will devastate her and the Cannonball, she knows Homer Bedloe is behind it. Kate has a dream that the hotel is under water and a guest comes by in a scuba suit. There are also fish that are guests. Kate needs to collect two hundred signatures for a restraining order petition. Kate comes up two signatures short and Bedloe is gloating. Bedloe brought along Mr. Fletcher (John Hoyt), the Commissioner of Conservation. He tells Kate the lake is going in whether she likes it or not. Without any of them knowing it, Floyd and Charley get Bedloe and Fletcher to sign the petition. Bedloe has a counter restraining order. Joe almost saves the hotel. But it's Dog that winds up saving the Shady Rest and makes Bedloe look bad. Note: This episode is the last one where Gunilla Hutton plays Billie Jo.
108	34	"Betty Jo's Bike"	Guy Scarpitta	Jay Sommers & Howard Harris	May 10, 1966	6534
Betty Jo wants to buy her friend Willie's motorized bicycle. Kate says she can if she is able to come up with the money. Betty Jo asks Charley and Floyd if there's a job for her on the train, but they have nothing. She puts an ad in the local paper. Betty Jo gets a babysitting job on the condition that Kate is around to supervise, to which Kate reluctantly agrees. Kate winds up doing most of the work. Willie got another offer for the bike. Betty Jo has two days to come up with the money. Now many other babysitting offers and many other babies come out of the woodwork. Unfortunately, the jobs are all for the same night and under the same condition of Kate supervising. With a lot of help from the family, they make it through the night. Betty Jo still doesn't have enough money. Willie says he'll trade his bike for Dog, but Betty Jo refuses.

=== Season 4 (1966–67) ===
Gunilla Hutton has officially left the series and Meredith MacRae plays Billie Jo for the remainder of the series.

No. overall	No. in season	Title	Directed by	Written by	Original release date	Prod. code
109	1	"Young Love"	Charles Barton	Ronny Pearlman	September 13, 1966	6601
Kate is surprised when Charley and Floyd bring in a large bag of mail. Turns out Uncle Joe started a Free Wedding and Honeymoon Contest to promote business for the Shady Rest. Out of all the entries, one stands out: that of Laura Bentley (Sylvia Field) and Tony Allison (Ernest Truex). They're a young couple whose parents will not allow them to get married. However, when they arrive at the hotel, they are actually an elderly couple whose respective grown children objected to their marriage. Joe is not happy, but Kate and the girls still want to give them the best wedding and honeymoon the hotel has ever seen. Laura's daughter Violet (Janet Waldo), and Tony's son Herbert (William Bakewell), arrive just in time to stop the wedding. Kate tries a little reverse psychology to get the bride and groom back on track. Kate's ploy has an unintended consequence when it causes Laura and Tony to have a fight. Hoping to make Tony jealous, Joe asks Laura to go on a canoe ride. Laura and Tony have another fight. Violet and Herbert return saying they were wrong to stop the wedding. In the end, Laura and Tony get married along with Violet and Herbert. Richard Hale as Judge Clarke. Guest star from Green Acres: Tom Lester as Eb Dawson
110	2	"Birdman of Shady Rest"	Charles Barton	Charles Stewart	September 20, 1966	6602
While the girls are swimming in the water tower, a bi-plane flies overhead. The young pilot, distracted by the beautiful girls he sees in the water tower, crashes the plane by the railroad tracks next to the hotel. Uncle Joe goes to get Dr. Barton Stuart (George Chandler). Kate and the girls manage to get the unconscious injured pilot up to the hotel. For all three girls, it's love at first sight. Dr. Stuart arrives. The girls look at his wallet and find that his name is Steve Elliott, he's twenty-four and has an honorable discharge from the air force. Dr. Stuart says that Steve is just bruised a little bit. He says it wouldn't hurt for Steve to stay at the hotel for a couple days. Steve wakes up and tells Kate he can't stay and he has to get to his plane. The three girls come in and Steve decides to stay. Joe believes Steve's a Russian spy. Kate and the girls later learn that he is a crop duster. Joe brings some Military policeman to see Steve. Steve and Major Corbett know each other. Joe now has plans to use Steve and the plane to make money for the hotel. Note: Mike Minor makes his series debut as young crop-dusting pilot Steve Elliott.
111	3	"Hooterville, You're All Heart"	Guy Scarpitta	Charles Stewart & Dick Conway	September 27, 1966	6603
Steve's plane is still sitting damaged where it crashed near the railroad tracks by the hotel. Uncle Joe wants to charge people $1 to see the plane. Kate tells him that just about everyone in the valley has already seen it. Henry Sharp (Jesse White), from the finance company, comes by because Steve has missed a payment. Kate tells Steve about Sharp. Steve has barely enough money to repair the plane let alone make his regular payments. Thanks to the girls, Sharp gives Steve 30 days to come up with the money. But then something goes wrong and Sharp wants his money right away. Steve decides to cut corners in repairing the plane. Kate, the girls and Joe try to help him raise some money, which ends up not being easy. Sunday at church, Reverend Jones (Lloyd Corrigan) enjoyed Steve's singing so much, he starts a contribution drive. They raise enough money to fix the plane and Steve is about to leave. When Kate christens the plane, she breaks the propeller. Steve takes it as sign and decides to stay in the valley. Tom Fadden as Ben Miller. Kay E. Kuter as Newt Kiley.
112	4	"He Loves Us, He Loves Us Not"	Charles Barton	Al Schwartz & Lou Huston	October 4, 1966	6606
Steve spends time individually with Billie Jo, Bobbie Jo and Betty Jo doing their favorite activities. Because of this, each girl believes that Steve has chosen her to be his girl and they let Kate know. Uncle Joe gives Kate a paper he found that has B.J. Elliott and Mrs. Elliot written on it. Joe tells Kate he wants to talk Steve into starting Carson-Elliot Air Express. Joe talks to Steve about the company he wants to form and how a wife would ruin things. Steve says he has no intention on marrying anyone at this point in his life. Kate knows she has to do something about the girls. Kate and Steve devise a plan to scare off each of the girls. But their plan almost backfires when it comes to Billie Jo. She says yes to Steve and goes to pack a suitcase. Kate panics but then finds out the suitcase is empty. Billie Jo played a little prank of her own.
113	5	"The All-Night Party"	Richard C. Moder	Dick Conway	October 11, 1966	6604
Uncle Joe is working on a jukebox that a salesman left when he couldn't pay his bill. Now the jukebox sends records flying. Since she's in junior college, Bobbie Jo thinks she's all grown up. She wants to go to an all night party with her friends. Kate refuses to let her go. Bobbie Jo says that all the other mothers are letting their daughters go. Kate still says no. At Sam's store, Kate runs into Mrs. Burris (Sheila Bromley) and Mrs. Tomley. The women are also against their daughters staying out all night. Mary Jane Burris (Melinda Casey) and Connie Tomley confront Bobbie Jo about Kate ruining the all-night party. Mary Jane and Connie decide they're going to the party despite what their mothers say. Kate tells Bobbie Jo she can stay out until 01:30 and the Cannonball will be ready to pick the girls up at that time. Bobbie Jo is not thrilled with the compromise. Scott (Jimmy Hawkins) comes by to pick up Bobbie Jo. Bobbie Jo implies she'll be staying out all night. Later, Bobbie Jo and the girls decide to go home on time. Kate has a surprise waiting for her and the others on the Cannonball. In the morning, Bobbie Jo thanks Kate and says she had a wonderful night. Song: "Tomorrow's Okay By Me," sung by Mike Minor. Guest star from Green Acres: Tom Lester as Eb Dawson
114	6	"Cannonball, Inc."	Richard C. Moder	Charles Stewart & Dick Conway	October 18, 1966	6605
Charley and Floyd derail the Cannonball going around Deadman's Curve. Charley believes the reason for the derailment was that Floyd had removed too many of the railroad ties to stoke the engine. Uncle Joe calls the C&FW Railroad, who agree to pay the necessary $300 insurance deductible for the repairs. Kate is now worried Homer Bedloe (Charles Lane) will show up and he does. Bedloe claims he's there to help. Bedloe finds out that Floyd's negligence caused the accident which in turn means the insurance company will not pay. Kate comes up with a plan where she gets some valley residents to put up the money and become stockholders of the train. The insurance company will then fix the train. But the Hooterville residents, taking over operation of the Cannonball, demand a lot of changes. Bedloe is loving the dissension this is causing. Things get so bad that Bedloe talks Charley and Floyd into quitting. Kate finds a way for everyone to get their money back and to have Charlie and Floyd back at their jobs. Virginia Sale as Maude Blake. Jess Kirkpatrick as Conrad Mosley.
115	7	"Kate Grounds Selma Plout"	Charles Barton	Al Schwartz & Lou Huston	October 25, 1966	6607
Kates runs into Selma Plout and her daughter Henrietta at Sam's store. They immediately make snide comments to each other. Sam thinks Selma is trying to pretty up Henrietta to hook Steve. Selma tells Uncle Joe that she's interested in investing in Steve's crop-dusting business. Floyd and Charley have a message for Steve and they give it to Kate. He's invited over to Selma's for a gourmet dinner. Billie Jo is upset because her and Steve are officially dating. Selma is surprised when Joe shows up instead of Steve, who had to make a last-minute flight. Selma ramps up her fight one notch by moving herself and Henrietta into the hotel to be closer to Steve. Henrietta is too shy to talk to Steve. That night, Steve is supposed to go flying with Billie Jo. Selma and Henrietta show up. Kate finds Billie Jo locked in a closet. Kate comes up with a plan. She enlists the help of Floyd and Charley to get Selma uninterested in Steve. Note: Elvia Allman's first of 17 appearances as Selma Plout; Lynette Winter's first of 7 episodes as Henrietta
116	8	"The Almost Annual Charity Show"	Charles Barton	Charles Stewart & Dick Conway	November 1, 1966	6609
It will soon be time for the Almost Annual Charity Show. Steve and Billie Jo are rehearsing a duet together. Selma comes by the hotel and tells everyone that Sam, the overseer of the show, appointed her the show's committee chair. Kate is surprised as that job was usually hers. Selma wants a few changes to the performing roster, including Steve singing with Henrietta. Steve refuses, even if it means he won't sing at all. Billie Jo tells Steve she wants him to sing with Henrietta. Kate finds out from Sam the reason he appointed Selma and it had to do with her paying her bill with Sam. Selma makes herself the headliner playing the part of a singing Cleopatra. Floyd and Charley audition for Selma. When news spreads around the valley that Selma's running the show, ticket sales plummet. Kate sets up a money back guarantee scheme to at least get people to the auditorium. It's the night of the show. Uncle Joe comes up with a scheme to make Selma think a storm is going to keep people from coming to the show. Selma learns there is no storm. Selma gets a case of stage fright and Kate actually defends her. The show goes on with Kate hosting. Songs: "Hawaiian Wedding Song", sung by Mike Minor & Meredith MacRae. "Stout-Hearted Man", sung by Elvia Allman. "Steam, Cinders and Smoke", sung by Smiley Burnette & Rufe Davis. "I Believe", sung by Mike Minor.
117	9	"How Bugged Was My Valley"	Charles Barton	Al Schwartz and Lou Huston	November 15, 1966	6610
Kate sees Steve as a possible future son-in-law. She believes his life as a pilot is too dangerous and she would like to see him get a different job. Kate learns from Bobbie Jo that Steve has a journalism background. Sam tells Kate he's just too busy to hunt down stories for the Hooterville World Guardian newspaper. She convinces Sam to turn over the running of the paper to Steve. With no crop-dusting work to be had in the valley, Steve accepts the offer. This move doesn't sit well with Uncle Joe, president of the Carson-Elliott crop-dusting empire. Joe goes on a quest for crop-dusting business from their valley neighbors. Meanwhile, Steve is disappointed that there isn't any real news to print. Joe tries to get Dog to hunt down some bugs, but that doesn't work. With no bugs infesting the crops, Joe manufactures some business with the help of some plastic bugs. Kate finds a jar of the plastic bugs in Joe's room and reprimands him. Before they could tell him, Steve found out about the fake bugs. He didn't charge any of the farmers. Things work out for Steve in the end because all the farmers signed up for regular crop-dusting service. Guy Wilkerson as farmer Roy Turlock.
118	10	"Twenty-Five Years Too Late"	Ezra Stone	Charles Stewart	November 22, 1966	6611
Uncle Joe tells Kate that her first boyfriend, Walter O'Connor (Dennis O'Keefe), is coming to stay at the Shady Rest and do some fishing. He is now a major league baseball manager. Joe thinks he's coming to court Kate because he could fish anywhere. Joe also thinks it would be good for Walter to see Betty Jo's baseball talent. Kate is anxious and nervous about why Walter is really coming. Walter arrives and Kate introduces him to the girls. Billie Jo talks to Steve about Kate and Walter getting married. Kate goes to Sam's store to buy some things and talks about Walter. Sam comes to the realization that he too has feelings for Kate. He tells her how he feels and kisses her. Walter and Kate are in the boat fishing. Kate can tell that Walter wants to ask her something and she keeps changing the subject. That night, Sam is pacing around the hotel lobby, waiting for Kate. Kate and Walter come back and sit on the hotel porch swing. Sam and the family go out to the porch. They learn that Walter proposed to Kate, but she turned him down. Sam is close to proposing, but Kate says they've been good friends for too long to spoil it with marriage. Sam is relieved.
119	11	"The Runt Strikes Back"	Charles Barton	Dick Conway	November 29, 1966	6612
There's a dance on Saturday. Kate wants to know why Billie Jo is turning down date requests from every boy in the valley. Billie Jo tells her she will only accept a date from either Steve or Don Bailey, the new young doctor in the valley. Turns out that Bobbie Jo has done the same thing that Billie Jo has done. Billie Jo and Bobbie Jo decide to flip a coin to see who gets Steve or Don. Left out is Betty Jo, who feels she has the right to be included in the dating discussion. Eb comes by and asks Billie Jo to the dance. When she says she already has plans, Eb asks Bobbie Jo. She also says she has plans. Eb then wants to ask Betty Jo. Betty Jo overhears this and hides. Betty Jo tells Kate that she's tired of getting her sister's "leftovers". Betty Jo decides to move out and she takes Dog with her. She asks Sam for a job. Sam says that if she can get his old truck started, she can have a job. Betty Jo does get the truck started. Through a series of misunderstandings, Billie Jo and Bobbie Jo wind up going to the dance with Eb and Betty Jo shows up with Steve and Don. Before long, the girls are paired off with the boys they should have been with all along. Guest star from Green Acres: Tom Lester as Eb Dawson
120	12	"Is There a Doctor in the Valley?"	Ezra Stone	Charles Stewart & Dick Conway	December 13, 1966	6613
Kate gets a letter saying Homer Bedloe is coming and he wants a room. Uncle Joe can't stand up straight and wants Doc Stuart. Stuart is busy and he sends young Dr. Donald Craig (Richard Tyler). Joe doesn't trust a young doctor, but Donald figures out what's wrong. Donald announces that he's leaving the valley since there just isn't enough business for him and Doc Stuart. Desperate for something to do, Don agrees to treat Fred Ziffel's pig, Arnold. Kate thinks she's come up with a solution for him to stay. He should specialize in house calls for people who can't make it into the office. He enlists the help of Floyd and Charley, who wait for him as he makes his stops along the rail line. Homer Bedloe arrives to see what trouble he can stir up to shut down the Cannonball. Bedloe thinks he can use Doc Craig's new business as a reason to shut down the train, because it delays the schedule. Kate figures out what Bedloe is up to. But, she also figures out how to have Doc Craig treat his patients and still have the Cannonball arrive on time.
121	13	"The Santa Claus Special"	Guy Scarpitta	Paul Henning & Mark Tuttle	December 20, 1966	6614
It's the Christmas season and everyone is putting up decorations. Meanwhile, Homer Bedloe tells Norman Curtis (Roy Roberts), the President of the Railroad, that despite it being Christmas time, he wants to do some train inspecting. He won't tell Norman where he's going. Decorating the Cannonball was supposed to start, but Charley and Floyd left the coach behind and have to go get it. Bedloe misses the Cannonball because he got stuck in a phone booth. He has to use a hand cart to get to the Shady Rest. Everyone's in a rush to decorate the Cannonball in preparation for their annual caroling and gift delivery runs. Uncle Joe and Charley argue over who is going to be Santa. Their plans for the Cannonball are placed into jeopardy with the arrival of Bedloe. He says that what they are doing is against railroad policy and he won't allow it. They hope to get Bedloe in the Christmas spirit by pampering him and singing to him. But it doesn't work. Norman learns that Bedloe went to Hooterville and will go to stop him from ruining Christmas for them. Norman puts an end to Bedloe's plans. Norman dresses as Santa and he makes Bedloe dress as his little helper. The Cannonball makes its Christmas run with everyone singing carols. Guest star from Green Acres: Tom Lester as Eb Dawson Note: This is a color remake of the first-season Christmas episode "Cannonball Christmas"; black-and-white stock footage of the Cannonball on its caroling run from that episode was used here.
122	14	"My Daughter the Secretary"	Guy Scarpitta	Al Schwartz & Lou Huston	December 27, 1966	6615
The Every Other Wednesday Afternoon Discussion Club is sending their secretary to the weekend long national conventional, all expenses paid. That means Billie Jo, but she doesn't really want to leave Steve for an entire weekend. However, Selma doesn't ever remember voting for someone to fill the position permanently. She wants to hold a special vote to elect a permanent recording secretary. Selma is pushing for Henrietta to go instead of Billie Jo. Kate does find in archived minutes of the meetings that Billie Joe volunteered for the job temporarily. It wasn't permanent. The outcome of the resulting vote, with only Billie Jo and Henrietta on the ballot, is a tie. Selma buys an electric typewriter for Henrietta even though she can't really type. Selma tries to find another woman to join the club and maybe break the tie. Selma then gets Floyd to join the club. Kate finds a way to have Selma's vote disqualified. Because she knows Billie Jo is a better secretary, Henrietta suggests a shorthand competition between her and Billie Jo. Billie Jo, on the other hand, finds a way for Henrietta to go. Dan White as Postman Homer Overstreet.
123	15	"The Rise and Fall of a Tycoon"	Charles Barton	Charles Stewart & Dick Conway	January 3, 1967	6616
Homer Bedloe shows up at the hotel unexpectedly. He's come to announce there will be a new general manager for the Cannonball, who will oversee the train's operations. At first they think it will be Charley and Floyd. Then they think it will be Steve. It turns out to be Uncle Joe. Joe starts to act like a tyrant bossing around Charley and Floyd. It's not long before everyone in the valley is mad at Joe for his new operating rules. Charley and Floyd quit leaving Joe to operate the train on his own, which he doesn't know how do. Turns out that is exactly why Bedloe appointed Joe. Bedloe says that Norman Curtis, President of the CF&W, is arriving shortly to make an inspection. Kate figures out Bedloe's plan. Kate begs Charley and Floyd to run the train again so Curtis sees that it's operating efficiently. Joe realizes how badly he was acting. Kate finds out from Joe that the Cannonball is stuck at the Pixley terminal. Curtis arrives and Kate manages to stall him from inspecting the train. The next morning Charley and Floyd get the Cannonball to the hotel just in time to take Curtis away.
124	16	"His Highness the Dog"	Charles Barton	Charles Stewart & Dick Conway	January 17, 1967	6618
Kate and Uncle Joe learn that a crew is filming a commercial at Lost Lake. The commercial stars Prince Hamlet of Kronenberg von Auschwile III, a very large but friendly dog. Mr. Morton (Bartlett Robinson), the film crew director, needs to get the film to New York as soon as possible. Joe takes Morton to see Steve. Morton says that Hamlet can't risk the flight in Steve's plane because he's so valuable. Morton arranges for Hamlet to stay at the hotel. Joe is to give him the best of everything. Joe comes up with a scheme to use Hamlet to advertise Sam's store and make money. Sam isn't interested. Dog starts to notice all the special attention that Hamlet is getting from Joe and the girls. Feeling unwanted, Dog runs away. Joe hopes to have Hamlet track Dog's scent. Betty Jo thinks she knows where Dog went, but she doesn't find him. Steve learns that Morton will be back that afternoon to get Hamlet. Dog is hiding under the hotel porch. When he sees Kate and the girls crying for him, he comes out. Joe comes back and says that Hamlet got loose. Everyone is out looking for Hamlet. Morton arrives and finds out Hamlet is lost. Everyone comes to realize who is really the valuable dog, when Dog finds Hamlet.
125	17	"Girls! Girls! Girls!"	Charles Barton	Charles Stewart & Dick Conway	January 24, 1967	6617
Jealousy will permeate the Shady Rest Hotel. After he agrees to go to the turnabout dance with Bobbie Jo, Tommy Johnson (Jack Bannon) has to back out due to another commitment. Bobbie Jo can't ask another boy because he'll know he was her second choice. As Billie Jo and Steve recently had a fight and Billie Jo isn't speaking to him anymore, Bobbie Jo feels that Steve is fair game. Kate thinks Bobbie Jo should ask Billie Jo if it's OK to ask Steve. Billie Jo says she doesn't care and Steve accepts Bobbie Jo's invitation. Tommy tells Bobbie Jo that he now can make it to the dance since the other commitment is no more. Since she already has a date with Steve, she now refuses Tommy. Feeling Tommy is now fair game, Betty Jo wants to ask him to the dance. Tommy says yes to Betty Jo's invitation. The problem with these pairings is that the girls are now jealous about each others boyfriends. Jerry Massett, a mechanic friend of Steve's from his Air Force days, is visiting Hooterville. Jerry ends up asking a free Billie Jo to the dance, which makes Steve jealous. The girls are jealous of each other again and start arguing. Steve is a little upset with Jerry. It's the night of the dance and a storm helps the girls get together with their proper boyfriends.
126	18	"Temperance, Temperance"	Charles Barton	Charles Stewart & Dick Conway	January 31, 1967	6619
Jeremiah Priddy (John Hoyt), a temperance lecturer, is coming to the valley. Kate and Sam find it odd as no one in the valley really drinks. Betty Jo has a quiet little boy follow her to Sam's store. She says he's been following her since baseball practice. She played catch with him and gave him a ball. Sam gives the boy some candy and he leaves. The boy hid in the Cannonball and now Betty Jo has to take him to the hotel. Kate feeds the boy and Uncle Joe reads him a story. They learn his name is Clint (Buddy Foster). Priddy arrives at the hotel and says the boy is his. He apparently ran away. It seems Mr. Priddy is not a very friendly man and abruptly leaves with Clint. Later, Betty Jo finds Clint back at the hotel. She hides him in an empty room until she can figure out what to do with him. While trying to bring Clint some food, Kate catches her. Kate has a talk with Clint and takes him to the Cannonball. There is Priddy who accuses Kate of baiting the boy into running away. Joe tells off Priddy. Kate has a change of heart about Priddy when she learns from Sam that he has no money and nowhere to stay. She uses this information to bring him and Clint closer together. Note: The girls sing "Sisters" and Steve sings "The Glory of Love".
127	19	"A Star is Born?"	Charles Barton	Dick Conway & Al Schwartz	February 7, 1967	6620
The National Amateur Hour is screening for new talent, and are holding auditions through the valley's own radio Station K. The winning performer is to receive $200. Once Uncle Joe hears about the prize money, he gets an idea. Joe tells Steve and Billie Jo that they should enter. Steve says he never thought about singing for money. It's time for the audition and the Announcer (Walker Edmiston) introduces Steve and Billie Jo. The family listens over the radio. Kate is trying to get people to vote for Steve and Billie Jo. Billie Jo tells Kate that a talent agent who heard the couple wants to represent them if they win the contest. His plans are for them to go on the road. Joe thinks he's going to be the agent. Billie Jo says the agent is Sydney Sparks (Peter Leeds). The girls are not happy about the idea of Billie Jo leaving. Joe thinks Steve should stay with his crop dusting. Joe believes that his Hootervile Volunteer Fire Department Band can win. Steve and Billie Jo are leading in the vote count and Sparks wants them to sign a contract. Joe and the band are the last to audition. Billie Jo wants to sign the contract and sees no downside. Steve is in no hurry. Steve and Billie Jo wind up winning. Billie Jo gets a little upset when Steve refuses to sign, but they make up. Walter Baldwin as Grandpappy Miller. Hank Worden as Roy Turlock. Song: Frank Loesser's "No Two People", sung by Steve (Mike Minor) and Billie Jo (Meredith MacRae)
128	20	"Shoplifter at the Shady Rest"	Charles Barton	Al Schwartz & Lou Huston	February 14, 1967	6608
Kate finds Eustace Pockle (Ben Lessy) locked in the non-functioning elevator. Uncle Joe tells Kate he made an arrangement with Sam, the valley's justice of the peace, to house the kleptomaniac shoplifter. They'll be paid $4 a day. Eustace can't be locked up in Pixley because Sheriff Crandall (Barry Kelley) is on a fishing vacation. Kate doesn't like the idea, but allows Eustace to stay. Unfortunately for Kate and the hotel guests, Joe treats the hotel more like a jail than a hotel. Kate and the girls treat Eustace more like a hotel guest than a prisoner. Guests Stanley (Olan Soule) and Mrs. Benson (Alice Nunn) want to cut their stay short because Mrs. Benson has a lot of valuables with her. Kate talks them into staying. Eustace finds a way to steal one of Mrs. Benson's pins. Kate learns what he did and he says he'll sneak it back into their room. She gives Eustace a chance to return it, but he just winds up taking something else. The Benson's leave. Crandall calls Sam because he found out Eustace was at the hotel and they were getting the money. Crandall decides to come back early so he can get some money housing Eustace at the Pixley jail. Eustace escapes from the Shady Rest. Steve and Joe go looking for him. Kate goes to the Pixley jail and finds Eustace in one of the cells. He claims he didn't want to cause anymore problems at her hotel.
129	21	"Don't Call Us"	Charles Barton	Dick Conway & Al Schwartz	February 21, 1967	6621
Billie Jo is excited to hear from Sydney Sparks, the talent agent that wanted to sign her and Steve after their radio talent show win. Sydney got her an audition at the Flamingo Room in Springdale. Billie Jo mentions how some people now want her autograph. Kate wonders why she's giving up on secretarial school. When Billie Jo is leaving, her sisters and Steve wish her luck. When she returns from the audition, Billie Jo is certain she got the job. Kate doesn't like the idea that they told Billie Jo "don't call us, we'll call you". Kate gets the news that Billie Jo didn't get the job because her name isn't big enough to draw in customers. Now Kate is upset that Billie Jo was turned down. Kate has a plan to get Mr. Austin (Frank Nelson), the Flamingo Room's manager, to change his mind. She has Sam and Uncle Joe call Austin wanting to make reservations based on Billie Jo being there. When Austin says Billie Jo doesn't perform there, the men cancel their reservations. Austin now wants to get Billie Jo. Everyone is at the Flamingo Room for Billie Jo's performance. Austin introduces Monique, who turns out to be Billie Jo in a sexy black dress and black wig. She starts singing in a bad attempt at a French accent. After the song, an unimpressed Austin pulls Billie Jo off the stage. Kate gets Billie Jo to be herself for the next song. Later, Billie Jo tells Kate that she's applying for a legal secretary job. Songs: "Falling in Love Again (Can't Help It)" and "I Enjoy Being A Girl", both sung by Meredith MacRae
130	22	"Hey, Look Me Over"	Charles Barton	Charles Stewart & Dick Conway	February 28, 1967	6623
Kate panics every time Steve gives Betty Jo flying lessons. Steve thinks she's ready to solo. Betty Jo is also Steve's grease monkey when he repairs the plane. Meanwhile, Uncle Joe has installed a burglar alarm for the front door of the hotel and Kate doesn't like it. Billie Jo becomes jealous of Betty Jo spending all that time with Steve. Billie Jo tries to be more like Betty Jo and be a grease monkey for Steve, but she doesn't know what she's doing. Betty Jo wonders what's going on and Kate tells her that Billie Jo feels threatened by her. Betty Jo now tries to be more grown-up and feminine. Everyone wonders why Betty Jo is dressed up. Betty Jo feels particularly bad when Steve says he thinks of her as more of a tomboy. Billie Jo tells Steve that she thinks Betty Jo has a crush on him. Hoping to put Betty Jo off gently, Steve says they should wait before she flies solo. Kate, Joe and Steve then see Betty Jo flying Steve's plane. Betty Jo lands the plane safely. Bobbie Jo comes by wanting to learn how to repair the plane.
131	23	"That's Max???"	Charles Barton	Al Schwartz & Lou Huston	March 7, 1967	6622
Dog delivers a telegram to Steve from his old flying buddy, Max Donohue. Steve tells Dog he's going to turn down the offer. At dinner, everyone wants to know what was in the telegram. Apparently, Max wants Steve as a business partner up in Cascade Valley. Steve hints at accepting the offer, but says he isn't. Billie Jo gets upset that he teased them like that and runs off. Kate suggests to Steve that Max join him in Hooterville. Steve says no to that idea but doesn't say why. Without Steve's knowing, Uncle Joe sends a reply to Max. Joe asks Max to relocate to Hooterville to join Carson-Elliott Enterprises. Max decides to check things out, which doesn't sit well with Max's business and personal partner Jack. Max arrives and turns out to be a beautiful woman. Billie Jo wonders why Steve didn't mention Max was Maxine. Joe tries to talk up his crop-dusting empire. Steve tells Max she will need to get an agricultural flying license from the state capitol. Billie Jo overhears part of the conversation and misinterprets it to mean a wedding license. She tells Kate, who says Billie Jo must have misunderstood. Steve sends a telegram that says everyone one should prepare for a wedding. There will be a wedding, but it will be Max and Jack.
132	24	"The Fishing Derby"	Charles Barton	Dick Conway	March 14, 1967	6624
Business has been very slow at the hotel. Dog gives Uncle Joe an idea how to increase business. Joe suggests to Sam that the hotel and his store host a fishing derby on Lost Lake. Joe says that as prizes they could give away a row boat, an outboard motor and a rod and reel. When Sam says they couldn't afford that, Joe says they would order the prizes on a 30-day layaway plan. Because the two of them always catch the biggest fish, Joe figures one of them will win. They'll return the prizes before the 30 days. In the meantime, the hotel will be filled up and Drucker's Store will be busy with new customers. Kate doesn't know about Joe's scam and wonders how Sam can afford the prizes. The derby is underway and business is picking up. For the time being, Floyd has the biggest fish. Joe is worried until Sam comes up with a bigger one. Kate finds out about the scam and is not happy. She says the hotel will pay for the prizes even if they go into debt. Rod Granger (George Ives), from the Riverside Chronicle, comes by to check out the derby. He tells them about all the fishing contests he's won. Just when it looks as though Granger is going to win, Joe comes in with a bigger fish.
133	25	"Kate's Big Deal"	Charles Barton	Charles Stewart & Dick Conway	March 21, 1967	6625
Kate is at Sam's store and she won't tell him the reason she's going to the big city. Selma comes by and also wants to know why Kate is going. The next day, the girls are wondering what Kate is up to. When Kate returns she tells everyone that she decided to sell the hotel. The money from the sale will give the girls the opportunity to do anything they want. The girls are excited at first. Charley and Floyd are sad at the thought of things not being the same. Even Selma doesn't want to see Kate leave the valley. Steve announces that he's staying because of his business. The girls realize that they like calling the Shady Rest home and they have things in their life there. Kate gets word that Mr. Holloway (Vinton Hayworth), a chain hotelier, will be arriving the next day to finalize the deal. Kate arranges a party for the locals to celebrate, but everyone is in a somber mood. Mr. Holloway arrives during the party. Kate feels that she made a verbal agreement with Mr. Holloway that she shouldn't back out of. Uncle Joe and the band try to use a little emotional blackmail to convince Kate not to sign the papers. Holloway senses Kate's reluctance and lets her out of the deal.
134	26	"Author! Author!"	Charles Barton	Charles Stewart & Dick Conway	March 28, 1967	6626
Bobbie Jo is thrilled that the poem she submitted to a magazine has been accepted for publication. Sam wants Eb to get a picture of Bobbie Jo and a quote from her. Sam devotes the entire front page of the World Guardian to Bobbie Jo. Uncle Joe hopes this won't give Bobbie Jo a swelled head. The sisters think that Bobbie Jo has changed. Billie Jo says the Bobbie Jo is hanging around with odd people at college. Bobbie Jo brings home Stanley Harper (Jimmy Hawkins), a beatnik. Bobbie Jo says Stanley is an intellectual who has taken her under his wing. He would like to take her to coffee house in Springdale. Kate wants to know what goes on at the coffee house. Stanley tries to explain about the entertainment there. Steve tells Kate that the coffee house has a lot of weird people hanging out there. He says that if Bobbie Jo were his daughter, he wouldn't want her hanging out in that place. Kate would like Steve to take her there so she can look the place over. At the coffee house, Kate and Steve see a lot of strange people. Bobbie Jo tries to keep out of sight, but Kate finds her. A woman performs a bleak song. Kate borrows the woman's guitar and performs a made up attempt at a beatnik song. The crowd loves it. Bobbie Jo learns that being a beatnik does not always make one an intellectual. Jack Perkins as Beatnik Painter. Guest star from Green Acres: Tom Lester as Eb Dawson
135	27	"Steve's Ol' Buddy"	Charles Barton	Charles Stewart & Dick Conway	April 4, 1967	6630
Steve receives a letter from his best friend Jeff Maxwell (Jimmy Hawkins), an air force captain. Steve had invited him to Hooterville and Jeff is finally taking him up on it. Kate and Steve go to Sam's store to meet Jeff. Sam says that Jeff will be delayed so Steve goes off to do a crop dusting job. Kate says she'll stay and wait for Jeff. Jeff meets the Bradley sisters. He is quite taken with them and they with him. After Jeff hits on Billie Jo, Steve tells him that Billie Jo is his girl. Jeff understands and says there are two other girls for him to work on. Jeff then makes a move on Bobbie Jo. Steve tells Jeff that Bobbie Jo is not his type. When Jeff learns that Betty Jo plays baseball, he strikes up a conversation with her about it. Jeff starts to get a little irritated when Steve tells him to lay off Betty Jo as she is too young. Steve gets Jeff a date with Henrietta Plout for the Friday night dance. The girls wonder why Jeff is suddenly not interested in them. They figure out that Steve is behind it all. Steve starts to feel bad about the way he's been treating Jeff and Kate explains to him why he did what he did. The girls decide to all be Jeff's dates for the dance. Steve gets to take Henrietta. Song: Irving Berlin's "It's a Lovely Day Today", sung by Billie Jo (Meredith MacRae)
136	28	"That Was the Night That Was"	Charles Barton	Charles Stewart & Dick Conway	April 11, 1967	6628
Kate tells Bobbie Jo that Uncle Joe is a little nervous because he's going to be made "Keeper of the Sand" at his Loyal Order of the Camels lodge. The rehearsal is that night. Joe and Sam, returning from the lodge meeting, see some strange lights in the woods. They then run across a mysterious man looking for lodging. He calls himself Dr. Isaac Newton and says that he's a geophysicist. Issac says the lights were from his camper, which he's having trouble with. Meanwhile, Steve tells Kate that the lights on the panel of his plane went out. Sam, Joe and Issac arrive at the hotel. The others find it strange that Issac seems to know a lot about them. Sam takes Steve to where the camper was, but it's gone. Issac doesn't seem concerned that it's missing. Other strange things happen. Kate tells Issac that some of the folks think he's an alien. He neither confirms nor denies it. Floyd and Charley know that Issac is starting to make Kate nervous. Despite the lodge being very secretive, the men offer to hold their next lodge meeting at the hotel. Joe is supposed to go through his initiation process. They hope that this ensures that Kate and the girls feel safe from Dr. Newton. During the ceremony, Newton pays his bill with odd money and then vanishes. Sam finds Newton's journal that contains some mysterious information. Note: Isaac Newton is played by prolific composer and arranger Frank De Vol.
137	29	"The Eternal Rectangle"	Charles Barton	Charles Stewart & Dick Conway	April 18, 1967	6629
Billie Jo is thrilled to have a one-week singing engagement in Omaha. Meanwhile, Uncle Joe is trying to install an electronic room service request system. He thinks he's found a secret passage way between some walls. Kate tells him that's the laundry shoot. The sisters are excited when Billie Jo gives them permission to keep Steve company. Bobbie Jo tells Kate that she asked Steve to the dance at college. Kate asks why she isn't going with Tommy. Joe has Dog help him run wires for his request system. After the dance, Betty Jo asks Steve to the movies the next night. Joe thinks he's finished with his request system, but it turns out there are quite a few bugs that need to be fixed. The girls each treat Steve like their own boyfriend. Kate makes the girls feel bad when they wish Billie Jo would be gone for more than a week. Each girl tells Kate that they think they're falling for Steve. Steve tells Kate that he's confused about how he feels about the girls. Both girls asked him to the church picnic. Billie Jo comes home early. Kate tells her that her sisters have become interested in Steve. Billie Jo doesn't mind because she met a great guy in Omaha. Song: "Three Of Us", sung by Linda Kaye Henning, Lori Saunders and Meredith MacRae Note: Smiley Burnette's last episode (in order of episode production)
138	30	"Kate's Cousin Mae"	Charles Barton	Charles Stewart & Dick Conway	April 25, 1967	6627
The family is having a party to celebrate Floyd and Charley's twenty-fifth anniversary of working together. The next day, Sam apologizes to Floyd and Charley for not being able to make the party. Kate's southern belle cousin, Mae Belle Jennings (Shirley Mitchell in the first of four appearances), arrives at Sam's store. Floyd and Charley fight over who will carry Mae Belle's bags to the train. Kate is surprised when Mae Belle arrives at the hotel. That night Floyd comes by all dressed up to call on Mae Belle. Floyd gets flustered and then leaves. Charley comes by to see Mae Belle. He leaves just as quickly as Floyd did. Kate gets on the Cannonball and hears Floyd singing a love song. Kate tells Sam that she's worried that Floyd and Charley will break up their professional partnership and their friendship because of Mae Belle. Kate asks Sam to call on Mae so as to maybe stop Floyd and Charley from competing against each other. That plan doesn't work when Sam falls for Mae Belle. After having a chat with Cousin Mae, Kate turns to Plan B. Floyd, Charley and Sam are each at the hotel with flowers. Kate has Judge Clark (Forrest Lewis) there ready to marry Mae Belle and one of the men. Sam and Charley decline but Floyd stands next to Mae. Mae Belle panics and tells the men she has to leave. Note: Smiley Burnette's last appearance (in order of episode airdate)
139	31	"A House Divided"	Charles Barton	Charles Stewart & Dick Conway	May 2, 1967	6631
Everyone in the valley is attending a picnic welcoming the newest citizens, Henry and Wilma (Sarah Selby) Tuttle. The Tuttle's are happy to be there because everyone is so friendly. Sam announces that with their arrival, Hooterville is now eligible to have a representative on the County Board of Supervisors. Sam and Kate are thinking about possible candidates. Kate suggests Elmira Peabody, the local schoolteacher. Sam is against the idea because Elmira is a woman. This starts everyone bickering over who should be picked, a man or a woman. Uncle Joe thinks Sam should run and Joe would be his campaign manager. Selma says that the women are backing Kate and Selma will be her campaign manager. Because the women have stopped shopping at Sam's store, he wants to back out of running. The sisters are mad at Steve because he did some skywriting for Sam's campaign. Kate feels bad that the women are boycotting Sam. Sam tries to make up with Kate, but only makes matters worse. Joe mentions to Sam that if they could influence the Tuttle's votes, Sam could win. The women try to convince Henry to vote for Kate, while the men try to convince Wilma to vote for Sam. Henry and Wilma decide to move away because of all the fighting. Now Hooterville doesn't have enough residents to warrant a representative. Jackie Joseph as Emily.
140	32	"Go Away, Fat"	Guy Scarpitta	Charles Stewart & Dick Conway	May 9, 1967	6632
Kate gets a letter saying her cousin Mae will be visiting soon. Mae also sent some Mod clothes for the girls and Kate. Mae arrives and tells everyone that with some backing from a wealthy banker, she plans on turning the Shady Rest into a health farm. They will use a diet and exercise program called the "Mae Method Reducing Course". The banker will guarantee the money if his daughter, Agnes Bedford, loses fifteen pounds in two weeks using the method. Mae also wants a man to use the method and she has Uncle Joe in mind. Mae wants the girls to wear their Mod clothes as an inspiration for Agnes. Mae can't stay as she has to go back and deal with the banker, leaving Kate to work with Agnes. The girls show Agnes some dance moves as part of the program. Betty Jo tells Steve that they're having a hard time with Agnes because all she can think of is food. Steve tries to get Agnes' mind off of food by singing to her. After some time, Agnes does lose 5 pounds. But she doesn't know how much longer she can go on. Kate, the girls and Joe's kindness in sneaking Agnes food doesn't help their cause. In the end, Agnes gains 12 pounds. Even Joe gained weight. Mae returns with a new scheme for the hotel and it involves raising chinchillas. Song: Steve sings "It's Been a Long, Long Time".

=== Season 5 (1967–68) ===
The first season without Smiley Burnette.

No. overall	No. in season	Title	Directed by	Written by	Original release date
141	1	"Is This My Daughter?"	Ralph Levy	Charles Stewart	September 9, 1967
Betty Jo has been traveling through Europe for the past three months as a graduation present. Billie Jo and Bobbie Jo wonder if the trip will have changed her. Kate doesn't think Betty Jo will be any different. Kate asks Steve to meet Betty Jo at the airport. When Steve sees Betty Jo, she acts very high class. She introduces Steve to her friends Peter (David Watson), Brad and Ronnie (Jack Bannon). Steve finds them to be very stuck-up and pretentious. Back at the hotel, everyone notices how different Betty Jo has become. Even Dog can tell she's changed. Betty Jo is surprised when Peter, Brad and Ronnie show up on the Cannonball. They say they wanted to see Hooterville and the Shady Rest firsthand. Betty Jo is initially ashamed of her background. Kate had arranged a welcome-home gathering for that evening. The men are very condescending to the guests, which upsets Kate and Steve. Betty Jo has also had enough. She goes and changes into her old clothes. She then apologizes to the guests, who she calls her real friends. She tells the men off and kicks them out. Merie Earle as Martha Hughes. Note: This is a very similar plot to Season 3, Episode 10, also involving Betty Jo and newfound sophistication. Credits: With the loss of Smiley Burnette, Rufe Davis now gets a solo screen credit in cab during the end credits.
142	2	"It's Not Easy to Be a Mother"	Ralph Levy	Charles Stewart	September 16, 1967
Betty Jo tells Kate that she wanted to make breakfast, because she will need to learn how to cook for when she gets married. Kate agrees to teach Betty Jo. Meanwhile, Billie Jo is packing for her nightclub act at the Flamingo Room. When Steve offers to carry her suitcase, it pops open. Kate sees all the skimpy outfits Billie Jo is going to wear. Kate wants to go with Billie Jo to see what this act is all about. The two arrive at the club and meet the owner, Barney Morgan (Herb Vigran). Kate becomes a typical stage mother when she sees Billie Jo in a tight bathing suit. Manager Syd Sparks (Peter Leeds) says it's all very innocent. Kate even has a problem with the song Billie Jo sings. Back at the hotel, Betty Jo cooked dinner. Her macaroni and cheese came out black, but Steve still eats it. Bobbie Jo goes to Drucker's store call to Doc Stuart because Steve is now sick. Just then Kate calls to see how things are going at the hotel. Sam tells her not to worry since "there's nothing you can do about it now". Kate jumps to the wrong conclusion and thinks Betty Jo got married. Kate rushes home. There's a little confusion, but then Kate learns about Steve being sick. Later, Billie Jo returns and says her act went over very well. Herbie Faye as Doodles. Phil Gordon as Charley. Song: Meredith McRae sings "Who Needs Memories Of Him".
143	3	"One Dozen Roses"	James Sheldon	Dick Conway	September 23, 1967
Uncle Joe is trying to set up a labor-saving luggage pulley system between the Shady Rest stop and the hotel's front porch. Betty Jo gets a floral bouquet signed "From an Admirer". The others doubt it was a local boy because they have no money. Billie Jo and Bobbie Jo suggest that the sender might be one of the boys she met in New York. Betty Jo receives many more bouquets. Kate finds a flaw in Joe's pulley system. Kate learns that Betty Jo's admirer is Eb and lets the girls know. Eb is not who Betty Jo expected. She asks Kate how she can let him down easy. Bobbie Jo suggests to Betty Jo that she get Steve to act as her boyfriend to scare away Eb. Joe is going to give his pulley system a trial run. It doesn't go well. Betty Jo tells Eb that Steve is her steady boyfriend. Eb starts to take swings at Steve until Kate breaks it up. Kate manages to convince Eb that things wouldn't work out with him and Betty Jo. Eb tells Betty Jo he won't be able to go out with her. It turns out that Steve actually has feelings for Betty Jo and he lets her know. Joe's pulley breaks the Shady Rest's sign. Guest star from Green Acres: Tom Lester as Eb Dawson
144	4	"I Can't Hear You When the Thunder is Clapping"	Ralph Levy	Charles Stewart & Dick Conway	September 30, 1967
While flying back from Springdale, Steve and Betty Jo are caught in an unexpected thunderstorm. Although there were some tense moments, they make it down safely. The experience throws Steve and Betty Jo into each others' arms and they kiss. Could it be that they are falling in love with each other? Betty Jo confides her feelings for Steve to Kate. Kate asks how Steve feels and Betty Jo says she believes he has the same feelings for her. Kate says that it all could be a reaction to their experience. Betty Jo is also concerned about possibly stealing Billie Jo's boyfriend. Steve later tells Kate that he has feelings for Betty Jo as well. Kate asks Steve to not say anything for a little while so she can think things through. Kate tells Uncle Jo and he thinks it will help the Carson-Elliot dynasty. Kate then tells Billie Jo and she has no problem with it as she is more interested in her career. Bobbie Jo doesn't mind either. Steve leaves a note saying he doesn't want to hurt the family so he's going away. Steve comes back saying he couldn't get his plane started. What no one else knows is that Betty Jo had something to do with the plane not starting.
145	5	"Pop Goes the Question"	Ralph Levy	Charles Stewart & Dick Conway	October 7, 1967
Uncle Joe tells Kate that he believes that Steve and Betty Jo will get married sooner rather than later. Kate thinks Joe might be rushing things a little bit. Steve hints to Kate that he does intend to marry Betty Jo. Kate fantasizes that it's Betty Jo's wedding day. But all Betty Jo can think about is playing on her baseball team. Back to reality, Kate has a chat with Sam. She decides to give Steve her blessing to propose. Steve is pretty sure that Betty Jo will say yes. But he is a little afraid she'll say no. Kate tries to give Steve and Betty Jo a proper setting for the proposal. But, one thing or another keeps preventing Steve from asking the question. Joe learns what's going on. Kate is worried that he will spread the news all over the valley before Steve can ask Betty Jo. Because of something that Floyd does, Steve wasn't able to ask Betty Jo. Sam puts that Steve and Betty Jo are getting married on the front page of the newspaper. Sam tells Kate the papers are already out for delivery. Kate shows Steve the paper and he asks Betty Jo and she says yes.
146	6	"A Cottage for Two"	Ralph Levy	Charles Stewart & Dick Conway	October 14, 1967
Uncle Joe is working on a walkie talkie system between the Shady Rest and Floyd on the Cannonball. Despite being secluded in the woods, Betty Jo has found what she thinks is the perfect house for herself and Steve after they are married. Betty Jo tells Kate and Steve about the house and that it's close to Pixley and the Cannonball. Betty Jo says that it will need just a little fixing. Steve mentions that he thought they were going to find an apartment in Pixley. They go to look at the house and it's very hard to find. When Steve sees the building, it's nothing but an old, dilapidated shack. Kate finally makes it to the house and falls through a hole in the front stairs. Steve sits in a chair that sinks into the floor. He then learns there's no bathroom. Steve does not like the place and they have a little argument. But then as difficult as it is, Steve wants to be supportive of Betty Jo's dream. He makes what he thinks is nice comment about the up side of owning that house. Betty Jo doesn't take it the right way and it places a strain on their relationship and upcoming marriage. Billie Jo and Bobbie Jo try to support their sister in how she feels about Steve's attitude. Kate tries to talk some sense into Betty Jo. Floyd is talking to Steve about something completely different, but then Steve realizes that he still loves Betty Jo. Joe figures out why the walkie talkies weren't working. Using the walkie talkies, Kate comes up with a way for Steve to let Betty Jo know how he feels about her. Song: "I Love You", sung by Mike Minor and Linda Kaye Henning
147	7	"Mind If We Join Your Wedding?"	Ralph Levy	Charles Stewart & Dick Conway	October 21, 1967
Floyd comes to Sam's store. He asks Sam to leave for a little while. Turns out Floyd wants to make a private phone call. He makes the call and starts singing a love song. Just then Kate walks in. He eventually confides in Kate that he's in love, but won't say who the girl is. Uncle Joe, who once took a private investigator's course, thinks he can uncover the identity of the mystery girl. Joe, however, doesn't get any information out of Floyd. Floyd tells Steve that he proposed and the girl accepted. Floyd won't say who it is as he doesn't want to jinx it. Steve tells Betty Jo that Floyd ask him if they could have a double wedding. Steve tells her that he accepted. Betty Jo at first is a little upset, but then she goes along with it. But when Steve says he also agreed to a double honeymoon, Betty Jo gets really upset. Kate thinks that if they could talk to the woman, they could convince her to have a separate wedding. Kate thinks she can find out who the woman is from Selma, the biggest gossip in town. Selma divulges that she is the mystery girl. Steve tells Betty Jo about Selma and it just makes matters worse. When Selma tells Floyd that they will leave Hooterville and he will have to give up the Cannonball, Floyd calls the whole thing off.
148	8	"Meet the In-Laws"	Ralph Levy	Charles Stewart & Dick Conway	October 28, 1967
Kate thinks she's coming down with something. Steve and Betty Jo are trying to complete the renovations on their cottage before the wedding. Kate and the girls are making arrangements for the soon to be wedding. Steve gets a letter from his parents, Mr. & Mrs. Donald Elliott (Hugh Beaumont and Ann Doran). They decided to stop by Hooterville on their way to a business convention. The letter also says they look forward to meeting Betty Jo and having one of her delicious meals. They also want to see their dream house. Steve admits to stretching the truth when he wrote to them. Kate says she can help with the meal. Betty Jo is still worried because the house isn't finished yet. Kate is ordered bed-rest by Doc Stuart (E.J. Andre) for what looks to be a 48-hour cold. She doesn't want to do it because there's too much to do. The Elliots arrive on the Cannonball and are greeted by the family. Doc Stuart was on the train as well. He gives Kate some medicine and tells her to get to bed. Betty Jo is having a terrible time in the kitchen. The others notice Betty Jo keeps bringing food up to Kate. Betty Jo is having her taste the food to see what's wrong. Kate and Betty Jo sneak back to the kitchen where they find Mrs. Elliot, who is ready to help. The next day, they go to see the cottage. Sam and some other men from town surprise everyone by having finished the work on the cottage.
149	9	"With This Gown I Thee Wed"	Ralph Levy	Joanna Lee	November 4, 1967
In this touching episode, Betty Jo finds what she thinks is the perfect wedding dress. Kate was hoping that Betty Jo would wear her old dress. When Kate sees that her daughter has brought home a dress, she doesn't mention hers. Uncle Joe has also bought a wedding dress. He shows it to the family and it has a big yellow flower on it. No one can bring themselves to say something to Joe. Kate's cousin Mae Belle Jennings (Shirley Mitchell) arrives at Sam's store. She tells Sam and Floyd that she brought a mini wedding dress from Paris for Betty Jo. Both Joe and Mae make fun of each others dresses. Billie Jo sees Kate's wedding dress. Betty Jo tries to think of a way to tell Joe and Mae about her dress. Betty Jo dreams about having a hoedown wedding in Joe's dress. She then dreams about having a 60's go-go dance wedding in Mae's dress. Billie Jo thinks she has the solution to all of Betty Jo's wedding gown problems. She tells Betty Jo about Kate's dress. Betty Jo tells Joe and Mae and they understand. It's the day of the wedding and Kate is surprised and happy when she sees Betty Jo in her dress. Reverend Meadows (Richard Hale) marries the couple.
150	10	"Hawaii Calling"	Ralph Levy	Charles Stewart & Dick Conway	November 11, 1967
An excited Sam races to the Shady Rest. He tells Kate he received a cablegram from Betty Jo and Steve. They are on the cruise ship as they're sailing to Hawaii for their honeymoon. Betty Jo and Steve will be calling Sam's store at 4pm the following day from Hawaii. Sam says that's a new long distance record for the store. Betty Jo and Steve arrive at their hotel room. Meanwhile, Bobbie Jo and Billie Jo are imagining being married and traveling to far off places. Kate and Sam are planning what they can do to make sure that the telephone call gets through. For some reason, Betty Jo is looking forward to seeing Steve shave. As 4pm approaches, Sam, Kate, the girls and Uncle Joe are all dressed up in Sam's store waiting for the call. Unfortunately, there are a few obstacles and the telephone call never comes through. Later that evening Kate goes back to Sam's store and calls the couple. Walter Baldwin as Grandpa Miller. Hank Worden as Luke. Nora Marlowe as Mrs. Quincy.
151	11	"Kate's Birthday"	Ralph Levy	Charles Stewart & Dick Conway	November 18, 1967
It's Kate's birthday. Sam shows her the local paper with a front page story about her birthday. Kate is grateful for all the presents and the birthday good wishes. However, she was hoping to receive something from Betty Jo and Steve who are still on their honeymoon in Hawaii. The Cannonball arrives with the mail, but there's nothing from the honeymooners. Kate starts to believe the two have forgotten her birthday. Meanwhile, Betty Jo and Steve hope to fly home early and in time for Kate's birthday. They are at the airport speaking with the Airline Clerk (Dick Wilson). Betty Jo thinks she may have left Kate's present in the taxi and Steve goes back to look for it. Betty Jo remembers that she did pack the gift in her suitcase. At the hotel, Selma comes by with a gift. Selma does kind of rub it in that Betty Jo didn't send something. Sam and Joe decide to go to the Pixley post office to see if anything for Kate is held up there. Steve and Betty Jo arrive in San Francisco. Betty Jo again misplaces Kate's present, and while looking for it, they miss their connecting flight. Floyd comes by the hotel and tells Kate that because Sam and Joe tampered with the mail in Pixley, the two wound up in jail. Kate goes to Pixley and talks to Sheriff Vic Crandall (Barry Kelley). Crandall wants to help and calls the post office. Just then, Steve and Betty Jo arrive at the jail. They explain that they made it back in time thanks to an old Air Force buddy of Steve's. Betty Jo gives Kate her gift. Song: The girls sing "My Mammy" to Kate as a birthday treat.
152	12	"The Honeymoon Is Over"	Ralph Levy	Charles Stewart & Dick Conway	November 25, 1967
Steve and Betty Jo are back from their honeymoon and have settled into their cottage. Betty Jo is still in a honeymoon state of mind. Steve has to go to work. Betty Jo wants to spend every moment of his free time with Steve. Bobbie Jo tells Betty Jo and Kate that it won't be long before one of them becomes the dominant figure in the marriage. Billie Jo announces that she got a gig for the Bradley sisters to sing at a show on Saturday night. Because Steve works all week, Betty Jo thinks she should devote the weekends to him. The girls still try to talk Betty Jo into it. Meanwhile, Uncle Joe and Sam are talking about how they could do better at duck hunting. Steve comes by and wants to buy a gift for Betty Jo because it's been three weeks since they got married. Steve would've liked to have gone on the hunting trip. Sam and Joe say Betty Jo probably wouldn't let him go. Joe and Sam then invite Steve to a poker game for Saturday. Steve really wants to go, but he can't make the commitment for sure. Kate comes by and gives Sam and Joe a hard time about giving out marriage advice considering they're bachelors. Betty Jo learns about the poker game and tells Kate and her sisters that she's a little surprised that Steve wants to go. Betty Jo agrees to sing with her sisters on Saturday. She has a plan that she thinks will ensure she comes out on top and she does. Jack Bannon as Sgt. Neely. Song: "Girl Talk", sung by Linda Kaye Henning, Lori Saunders and Meredith MacRae
153	13	"A Horse on You, Mr. Bedloe"	Ralph Levy	Dick Conway	December 2, 1967
Sam shows Kate the new shopping cart he got for the store. Kate receives a surprisingly sweet letter from Homer Bedloe (Charles Lane) saying he will be coming to the Shady Rest for a few days. Kate is suspicious. Things don't go well with the shopping cart. Bedloe arrives and is just as sweet as his letter. He tells Kate that he is here because a valuable race horse is being transported from Hooterville to Pixley on the Cannonball. He wants to be around to make sure all goes as planned. Bedloe even brought a present for Betty Jo. Kate brings the present to Steve and Betty Jo. Ray Rogers (William Joyce), the race horse owner, comes by and Billie Jo and Bobbie Jo thinks he's handsome. Kate still wonders why a race horse is being brought on the Cannonball. He tells Kate that the horse is being transported to a county fair. But when Kate sees the broken-down nag that they are calling a race horse, Kate knows that Bedloe and Rogers are working together. Kate finds out from Floyd that Rogers is insuring the horse for $10,000. Kate learns that a horse that is insured for that much must have a baggage man riding with it. Bedloe will use this technicality to shut down the Cannonball. Betty Jo volunteers to run the train without Steve knowing. And Floyd will be the baggage man. But then Steve comes home early and ruins the plan. Kate comes up with another way to save the Cannonball. The plot revolves around the loss of Smiley Burnette but doesn't mention why he is missing. Today's audience will cringe at Steve's new attitude toward Betty Jo now that he is married to her. She can not be the grease monkey that he fell in love with and married. What's worse is that Kate agrees. Credits: Rufe Davis now shares screen credit with Frank Cady with Sam & Floyd standing outside the baggage car in the end credits.
154	14	"Kate's Day in Court"	Ralph Levy	Charles Stewart & Dick Conway	December 9, 1967
Kate comes to the hotel quite upset. Kate received a ticket for jaywalking against a new traffic light in Pixley. The light is supposed to be operating only during peak hours. Kate believes it was in operation during a non-peak time when she crossed. So she decides to take the case to court. Sam shows Kate the newspaper he printed up with her story on the front page. Sam thinks she should just pay the $2 fine. Kate finds that most of the people in the valley believe she's in the wrong. Kate goes back to Pixley to try and find anyone who can verify that she was at the traffic light during an off-peak time. In court, Kate tells Judge Turner (Parley Baer) that she is not guilty. The Prosecutor calls Deputy John Edwards (Jack Bannon) to the stand. He was the one that wrote the ticket. Uncle Joe calls Floyd as a surprise witness trying to help Kate, but it doesn't work out the way he hoped. Kate actually comes up with a way to prove her innocence. Ralph Manza as Pierre.
155	15	"Uncle Joe and the Master Plan"	Ralph Levy	Charles Stewart & Dick Conway	December 16, 1967
Billie Jo and Uncle Joe arrive back from Omaha, where Billie Jo had a singing engagement. While there, Joe applied for the Shady Rest to be listed in the Master Plan hotel directory. It cost $50 for the application, but Joe figures they'll make that up with all the guests they will get. The next day, Kate is talking to their one guest, Mrs. Pruit (Sarah Selby). Billie Jo thinks they should give Joe a chance with his plan. In Omaha, many of the people really took Joe seriously. Kate then tells Joe she will back his plan and hope they are accepted. An obnoxious and demanding guest arrives named Gaylord Martindale (Reginald Gardiner). He claims he's a painter, but Joe thinks he is there to make a secret inspection for the directory. Joe wants to do anything he can to please Martindale. Martindale could be the most demanding guest they have ever had. Martindale gives Kate a list of the types of food he will eat and he will eat alone. Kate now has to ask Mrs. Pruit if she will eat in the kitchen with the family. Mrs. Pruit is very accommodating. Trying to give Martindale a fancy dinner does not go well. Everyone learns that Martindale is not with the Master Plan, but Mrs. Pruit is. She likes the hotel very much. Songs: Steve and Betty Jo sing "True Love" and the whole gang sings "Let Me Call You Sweetheart".
156	16	"All That Buzzes Ain't Bees"	Guy Scarpitta	Peggy Elliott	December 23, 1967
Kate is trying to teach Betty Jo how to cook, but it isn't going well. Betty Jo tells Kate that her and Steve have made a pact to tell each other everything and never lie to each other. Uncle Joe's latest scheme has him keeping bees, hoping to make a fortune selling honey. Joe tells Kate that he borrowed $25 from Steve to buy equipment. Betty Jo wants to go to Pixley for dinner and a show, using the $25. Steve tells her that he lent the money to Joe and she gets upset. Joe is having a hard time collecting bees. Kate helps Steve and Betty Jo by giving them the $25. Joe discovers that what he thought were bees are actually hornets and they have infested the hotel. Steve and Betty Jo get into another argument when he tells her they can't go out because he has to help Joe with the hornets. Kate arranges for her guests to stay at the Pixley Hotel. Joe has started fumigating the hotel. Steve and Betty Jo are still fighting. The others come over hoping to stay there, which indirectly solves a problem that the couple were having.
157	17	"All Sales Final"	Ralph Levy	Charles Stewart & Dick Conway	December 30, 1967
Steve learns that his checking account is overdrawn. It seems Betty Jo is writing checks faster than Steve is putting money into the account. They agree that Betty Jo will not spend any more money for a month. What Betty Jo didn't tell Steve is that she has already purchased an extremely long sofa for $100 from Agnew's Furniture Store. Betty Jo tries talking Kate into telling Steve about the sofa, but Kate refuses. That night, Betty Jo isn't able to tell Steve. The next day, Floyd and Uncle Joe deliver the sofa to Steve's house. The problem is that the sofa doesn't fit in their tiny living room unless a wall gets knocked down, and the sofa was a no return sale. Kate talks profit hungry Mr. Agnew (William O'Connell) into taking the sofa back for $90. Steve tells Sam he would like to surprise Betty Jo with a piano. Without mentioning the piano, Steve asks Betty Joe if he could knock down a wall in the house. Steve is a little surprised when she is all for it. Thinking there will now be room for the sofa, Betty Jo has Kate go and repurchase the sofa. Betty Jo finds out about the piano and once again Kate has to return the sofa for a loss. Steve finds out about the sofa from Joe and has Kate buy it again. Betty Jo has a hard time deciding between the sofa and the piano. Steve and Betty Jo decide to keep both items. Sam Edwards as Store Clerk. Songs: The gang sings "Oh! Susanna" and "Shine On, Harvest Moon" at the end while in the baggage car of the train.
158	18	"The Power of the Press"	Ralph Levy	Charles Stewart & Dick Conway	January 6, 1968
Bobbie Jo tells everyone that she and Jeff Powers (Geoff Edwards), a boy she is infatuated with, will be working on a newspaper together. The school professor is allowing students to put out an existing newspaper for a week as an assignment. Bobbie Jo is hoping Kate will ask Sam if she and Jeff can be the editors of the Hooterville World Guardian for the week. Sam is thrilled to let them do it. Jeff will soon be arriving at the hotel and Bobbie Jo wants everyone to make a good impression. Billie Jo is surprised at how nerdy Jeff looks. Jeff tells Sam that he has a hard-hitting view of newspaper journalism. Sam is having second thoughts about his decision. Jeff's first headline already takes aim at a local politician and Sam is worried. Kate and Joe think Jeff is doing the right thing. The Hooterville Volunteer Fire Dept. band is practicing in Sam's store. Bobbie Joe tells Jeff that Newt Kiley's barn burned down because the fire department didn't show up. Uncle Joe is the Fire Chief and Bobbie Jo goes to talk to him. It turns out that the alarm was sounded while the band was playing and they didn't hear it. Jeff's story worries Bobbie Jo when it mentions Uncle Joe and the other men by name. The men confront Jeff. Some good does come out of it all. Burt Mustin as Grandpa Jenson. Hank Worden as Band Member. Jack Orrison as Band Member.
159	19	"Steve, the Apple Polisher"	Ralph Levy	Charles Stewart & Dick Conway	January 13, 1968
J.P. Marshall (Frank Wilcox) checks into the hotel. Uncle Joe tells Billie Jo that Marshall recently bought much of the farm land in the valley. Meanwhile, Steve tells Betty Jo that he had a falling out with Mr. Bennet and lost his contract. Steve goes over Betty Jo's books and finds they're in the red. Joe learns from Marshall that he's there to do some land maintenance. Joe sees an opportunity to secure the crop-dusting contract for his fields. Joe convinces Steve to do whatever Marshall wants to secure the contract, even though Steve hates being an "apple polisher". Marshall's voluptuous daughter Millicent (Joi Lansing) arrives. Millicent complains to her father how dull things seem to be there, but then she sees Steve. Billie Jo and Bobbie Jo are not happy with Millicent's flirting. Steve now also has to be nice to Millicent, and Betty Jo is not happy about it. Betty Jo doesn't like Millicent as the competition and leaves not-so-subtle reminders to Steve that he's married. Steve tells Marshall that he won't be an apple polisher even if it means losing the contract. Marshall tells Steve that is exactly the kind of man he wants and gives Steve the contract. No Kate in this episode as Bea Benaderet's cancer forces her to leave the show.
160	20	"The Barber Shop Quartet"	Ralph Levy	Charles Stewart & Dick Conway	January 20, 1968
Uncle Joe's barbershop quartet are practicing. One member is singing a bunch of bad notes. They soon realize that the one singing off key is Joe. Sam tells Joe how important the Winter Festival competition is. Joe decides to drop out if they can find somebody to replace him. Joe figures that they won't be able to find someone. They quickly get Grampa Jenson to fill Joe's place. Joe tells Bobbie Jo and Billie Jo that he never wants to hear the name Sam Drucker again. Joe practices signing and Dog starts to howl. Joe tells Sam their friendship is over. Selma Plout (Elvia Allman), the chairman of the Winter Festival's judging committee, asks Joe to be on the panel of judges. Her request has an ulterior motive as Henrietta has entered the contest. Selma implies that she will give Carson-Elliott Enterprises her crop-dusting business if Joe votes for Henrietta. Bobbie Jo and Billie Jo ask Betty Jo to have Steve intervene. Steve invites Sam and Joe over for dinner. The two didn't know the other was invited. Steve shows films of them in happier times. The plan doesn't work and the two leave angry. Something Sam does at the competition repairs his and Joe's friendship. The quartet wins. Kay E. Kuter as Newt Kiley. No Kate in this episode.
161	21	"Come Home Higgins"	Ralph Levy	Charles Stewart & Dick Conway	January 27, 1968
Dog is visiting Betty Jo and Steve at their home. Kate comes by looking for Dog. She was worried because it's the longest he's ever been gone. Back at the hotel, Bobbie Jo and Billie Jo are looking for Dog. Betty Jo and Kate bring him back to the hotel. Billie Jo and Bobbie Jo are angry that Betty Jo didn't send him back where he belongs. Betty Jo doesn't like the suggestion that Dog doesn't equally belong to her. That evening, Dog returns to Betty Jo and Steve's. They bring him back to the hotel and more snide remarks are made. Betty Jo and Steve walk home and there is Dog. Betty Jo mentions that it was her that Dog initially followed home from school. Steve sides with Billie Jo and Bobbie Jo and Betty Jo has him sleep on the couch. The next day, Uncle Joe tells Sam what's going on. Sam sides with Betty Jo. Sam and Joe get into an argument. Steve thinks he has the answer when he gets Betty Jo a cute girl dog named Colette. But Dog winds up coming over to visit Colette. The sisters continue feuding and Dog runs away. Everyone looks for Dog with no luck. Dog finds a way to get the sisters to stop fighting. While the episode title does not appear on screen, it uses Dog's real name of Higgins which was never used in the series.
162	22	"Girl of Our Dreams"	Guy Scarpitta	Charles Stewart & Dick Conway	February 3, 1968
Uncle Joe is trying to get his chickens to lay more eggs. He even bought a record album of Latin music to encourage the chickens. Bobbie Jo tells Joe that Florabelle Campbell (Joan Blondell) is coming to stay at the hotel. Joe remembers her as the valley's beauty while he was growing up. News of her visit quickly spreads. Sam comes by to find out when she's arriving. Joe pretends that he's not interested in Florabelle. Sam goes to Bert Smedley's (Paul Hartman) barbershop. Ralph (Frank Faylen) is there and he already knows Florabelle is coming. Sam wants the works to look good for Florabelle. Joe comes by wanting the same. They believe that they can rekindle their romances with Florabelle. The Cannonball arrives and Sam and Joe mistake an unattractive woman for Florabelle and leave. Florabelle gets off and meets Bobbie Jo and Billie Jo, who bring her to the hotel. When Florabelle arrives, she doesn't remember either Joe or Sam. Ralph teases Sam about Florabelle not remembering him. Florabelle comes by Steve and Betty Jo's place because she remembered the cottage from back in the day. It takes Betty Jo and a year book to jog Florabelle's memory. They all then have a wonderful evening. No Kate in this episode.
163	23	"Uncle Joe Runs the Hotel"	Ralph Levy	Charles Stewart & Dick Conway	February 10, 1968
While Kate is away, Uncle Joe has been left to manage the hotel. Betty Jo invites her sisters over for lunch. Before they leave, Joe complains about their only guest, 'Old Man' Bill Clayton (Vaughn Taylor), who Kate allowed to stay despite having no money. Joe decides to collect his rent or kick him out. Joe changes his mind, but Clayton sees the hotel bill after Joe accidentally drops it. Clayton feels bad and decides to leave. Joe asks him where he'll go, but Clayton doesn't know. Joe tries to get him to stay. Thinking that he kicked Clayton out, Billie Jo and Bobbie Jo get mad at Joe. Sam and Floyd treat Uncle Joe like a social outcast. Joe overhears Billie Jo reading a letter from Kate. In it, Kate says they should take care of Mr. Clayton and treat him as a guest. Feeling bad, Uncle Joe decides to leave. Billie Jo and Bobbie Jo tell Sam and Floyd that Joe's gone. Joe finds an old run-down cabin. Turns out Clayton is living there. Clayton insists that Joe stay. Joe sneaks back to the hotel to get some food and then later bedding. The girls and Steve find out where Joe's been hiding and get both him and Bill back. No Kate in this episode
164	24	"Billie Jo's First Record"	Ralph Levy	Charles Stewart & Dick Conway	February 17, 1968
Billie Jo is thrilled that her first 45 record has been produced. She plays the record for the family. Sam brings Billie Jo a telegram that states the record company has plans to market the record heavily. They'll be sending a publicity man to interview her. Billie Jo is worried that she won't be exciting enough for the press agent. Ted Swift (Del Moore) arrives and is immediately not impressed with the surroundings. Swift goes to his room to try and think of a way to market Billie Jo. He decides to market her as a glamorous and sophisticated southern belle. Billie Jo likes the idea. Steve and Betty Jo hate it because that's not the real Billie Jo. Swift starts taking various photos of Billie Jo. Uncle Joe tells Steve that he hopes to get Swift to promote his magic act. Joe shows Steve one of his tricks and it doesn't go well. Sam doesn't like the direction Swift's promotion is going. He doesn't think Kate would like it. Billie Jo eventually decides she doesn't like the idea either, even if it risks her recording career. Swift gets ready to leave. Mr. Cameron (Jay Jostyn), from the record company, stops by and says he wants to promote Billie Jo just as she is. Note: Steve lists the celebrities he'd like to be linked with, naming the biggest female stars of 1968: "Brigitte Bardot, Elizabeth Taylor, Sophia Loren, Jane Fonda, Ann-Margret, Juliet Prowse, Jill St. John, Susan Strasberg, Kim Novak, Natalie Wood, Raquel Welch, Julie Christie, the Lennon Sisters..." Song: "The Girl From Ipanema" (adapted as "The Boy from Ipanema") sung by Meredith MacRae No Kate in this episode
165	25	"Mae's Helping Hand"	Guy Scarpitta	Charles Stewart & Dick Conway	February 24, 1968
With the arrival of Stanley (Olan Soule) and Mrs. Benson (Alice Nunn), the hotel is now full. The girls and Uncle Joe receive a letter from Cousin Mae Belle Jennings. Mae says that because Kate is still gone, she is planning on coming by to take charge. They are not looking forward to Mae's visit. Mae arrives before they can think of a way to stop her. Steve mentions the cottage remodeling and Mae says she can help with that. Joe tries to tell Mae there are no rooms left. Something goes wrong and the Benson's decide to leave. Mae causes a problem with the hotel's relationship with Drucker's Store. Mae then ruins Bobbie Jo's date with Jeff Powers. Joe goes to patch things up with Sam, but they get into an argument. Just then, Aunt Helen arrives at the store. Helen has retired from teaching and is doing some traveling. Mae messes with Billie Jo's singing career. Helen tells the girls that she's sure Mae just wants to help. Helen too ends up a victim of Mae's meddling when she sends all of Helen's travel reservations back. Helen comes up with a way to convince Mae that there is somewhere else that she needs to be. Note: Rosemary DeCamp appears as Aunt Helen in the first of six episodes in a row. No Kate in this episode
166	26	"Bad Day at Shady Rest"	Ralph Levy	Charles Stewart & Dick Conway	March 2, 1968
Uncle Joe is showing Aunt Helen he newest labor-saving device for the hotel. However, it doesn't work the way it's supposed to. Jeff Powers can't find a big story in his final week as a reporter for the Hooterville World Guardian. What Jeff doesn't know is that Sam and Joe are being held up by an armed masked bandit at the store. Turns out the bandit is a Mr. Lawson (Alan Reed), who just checked into the hotel. He claims he's a greeting card salesman. Lawson overhears Joe tell Helen and the girls what happened. Joe tells them and Lawson that he could identify the bandit if he saw him again. Joe goes to Bert Smedley's barbershop in Pixley. They talk about the robbery. Pixley's Sheriff Crandall is also there and Joe asks him why he doesn't do more to catch criminals. A call comes in saying the Pixley Bank had just been robbed. Joe makes another comment about crime in the valley. Sheriff Crandall decides to deputize Joe. Betty Jo tells Joe that an inflatable rubber life raft he ordered arrived. Joe's labor-saving device gives him a clue that Lawson is the crook. Joe's life raft and Helen's hat pin help capture Lawson. No Kate in this episode
167	27	"Cannonball for Sale"	Ralph Levy	Charles Stewart & Dick Conway	March 9, 1968
Uncle Joe and Sam are throwing horseshoes and it's not peaceful. The Cannonball arrives at the Shady Rest with a "For Sale" sign and Homer Bedloe. Sam and Joe explain to Helen about Bedloe's hatred of the train. Bedloe says the train will go to the highest bidder. One bid has already come in from a junk dealer who wants it for scrap. Bedloe also tells them that the sale is out of his hands because the C & FW Railroad has been sold to the H. Greene Company. Some of the locals want to try and raise the money to outbid the junk dealer. Thanks to Helen, they find out that bid is higher than what they can possibly raise. Sam is starting to box up things in his store. With the Cannonball gone, he won't have any business. Joe and Sam decide to go to Chicago and meet with H. Greene. Joe sends a telegram about their upcoming arrival and makes it sound as though they are wealthy businessmen. When they get there, they discover that H. Greene is Henrietta Greene (Lurene Tuttle). They try to make out that they're big shots, but Henrietta isn't falling for it. Once Henrietta realizes how much the Cannonball means to the valley, she calls off the sale. Gavin Gordon as the Butler. Owen Bush as the Chauffeur. No Kate in this episode
168	28	"My Pal Sam"	Ralph Levy	Charles Stewart & Dick Conway	March 16, 1968
Uncle Joe and Steve are at Bert Smedley's barbershop. Joe is having a disagreement over the names of the planets. Sam comes in saying he has good news. He has decided to remodel the general store. It will be closed for five days while he goes on vacation. He had a lot of options, but Sam decides to spend his time at the Shady Rest. Joe is excited to have all this time with his best friend. Bert warns Joe about "too much of a good thing". At the hotel, every time Joe wants to do something with Sam, something else comes up. When Joe wants to go fishing, Sam is busy putting up shelves in the kitchen. Sam ends up spending most of his time helping Helen around the hotel. It's day four and Sam goes to see Bert. Sam says that Joe's been in a bad mood. Bert tells him Joe was looking forward to doing things with him. Sam hopes to make it up to Joe on the last day. They play horseshoes, go hunting and fishing and play checkers. Joe is getting worn out and is kind of glad when Sam's vacation is over. Songs: Steve and Betty Jo sing "Somethin' Stupid", the gang sings "Shine On, Harvest Moon", and Sam serenades Helen with "Sweet Afton". No Kate in this episode
169	29	"Ring-A-Ding-Ding"	Ralph Levy	Charles Stewart & Dick Conway	March 23, 1968
Steve returns from a crop-dusting convention. Betty Jo is celebrating with a large surprise homecoming party. Uncle Joe jokes about the conventions he's been to and all the women there. Betty Jo notices that Steve is not wearing his wedding ring. A suspicious Betty Jo later learns that Steve took it off to get it engraved. Betty Jo had been wanting him to do it for some time. She apologizes for what she thought. They make a pact never to remove their wedding rings again. But when Betty Jo takes her ring off to show Bobbie Jo her engraving, she accidentally drops it down the kitchen sink drain. Helen suggests that Betty Jo tell Steve what happened and maybe he can take the pipes apart. But, Betty Jo doesn't want Steve to find out. Uncle Joe tries to help, but he winds up flooding the kitchen. Things get worse when he tries to pump the water out. Betty Jo then calls plumber Mr. Peck (Dabbs Greer). Sam warns her that it could cost quite a bit of money. Betty Jo and Billie Jo dress up as old women hoping Mr. Peck will feel sorry for them. Mr. Peck arrives and gets the ring out. Because of something that Dog does, Peck realizes they aren't old women. When Betty Jo doesn't have the money to pay, Mr. Peck takes the ring until she can come up with the money. Uncle Joe comes up with a plan to get the ring back. Steve comes home and tells Betty Jo he had to take his ring off. No Kate in this episode
170	30	"Kate's Homecoming"	Ralph Levy	Charles Stewart & Dick Conway	March 30, 1968
Steve does some sky writing that says "Kate Bradley Coming Home". Arguments begin about where her official welcoming celebration will take place and who will preside. Mayor Potts (William Mims) wants to preside over it at a downtown location. Uncle Joe wants to preside over it at the Shady Rest. Sam wants to preside over it outside his store. Joe and the Hooterville Volunteer Fire Dept. Band rehearse. Joe and Sam have another argument over where the celebration will be and Joe quits as band leader. Joe is decorating the hotel. Selma comes by and tells Joe she wants to preside over it in her garden. Helen finds a way to get Selma to change her mind. Everyone is waiting for Kate's three o'clock arrival in front of Sam's store. Meanwhile, Kate is waiting at the Pixley train station. The Station Master (Rolfe Sedan) asks her if she's sure someone is coming to get her. Sams reads her message to Uncle Joe and realizes that Joe didn't read the part that said she will be arriving in Pixley. Everyone boards the Cannonball and heads to Pixley. Steve just happens to run into Kate and tells her about the celebration. Kate finds a way to not spoil their surprise. Amid the chaotic festivities, including Joe setting fire to the Pixley station, Kate muses "There's no doubt about it, I'm home." Dennis Fimple as Elwood. Songs: The girls sing "Up, Up and Away" and Sam's barbershop quartet sings "Welcome Home, Kate Bradley" to the tune of "Won't You Come Home Bill Bailey". Bea Benaderet's hopeful but brief return to the series.

=== Season 6 (1968–69) ===
Rufe Davis (Floyd Smoot) left the series in season 6 over a contract dispute guaranteeing him appearances in the episodes.

No. overall	No. in season	Title	Directed by	Written by	Original release date
171	1	"Birthplace of a Future President"	Ralph Levy	Charles Stewart & Dick Conway	September 28, 1968
Mr. Andrews (Herb Voland), from Chicago, arrives at the hotel and happily says that nothing has changed. Then he sees a pregnant Betty Jo. Kate tells him the story of how they met Steve. She then tells him the story of how Steve proposed to Betty Jo and the wedding day. Uncle Joe, Sam, Newt Kiley and Wendell Gibbs (Byron Foulger) are trying to pick names for the baby if it's a boy. Doc Stuart (Regis Toomey) tells Kate that Betty Jo is doing fine. Wendell, the new engineer of the Cannonball, is hoping people will start calling him "Cannonball". Floyd was promoted to an office job. Steve announces that he wants Betty Jo to stay with his Aunt and Uncle in Baltimore. She will have the baby in one of the best hospitals in the country. Everyone is surprised and disappointed. They were looking forward to another baby being born in the valley. The townsfolk see Betty Jo leaving as a slight on the valley. They decide to snub Betty Jo and Steve. Betty Jo asks Kate her advice and she says Steve just wants what is best for her. Steve reconsiders when he sees Doc Stuart in action. Jean Vander Pyl as Clara Miller. Premier episode for the new train engineer Wendle Gibbs played by Byron Foulger, who previously appeared as Mr. Guerney the bank manager. Rufe Davis (Floyd Smoot) left the series in season 6 over a contract dispute guaranteeing him appearances in the episodes.
172	2	"The Singing Sweethearts"	Ralph Levy	Charles Stewart & Dick Conway	October 5, 1968
Ted Swift (Sid Melton), a booking agent, is driving through the area. He hears the Bradley Sisters singing on the radio and is very impressed. Ted stops at Sam's store and asks about the girls. He wants to book them for the season opener of the Buddy Buster (David Ketchum) television program. After Sam shows him a photo of the girls, Ted signs a contract with Uncle Joe for the girls' appearance. Kate reminds Joe that Betty Jo's pregnancy is not exactly television friendly. The girls says that they can't perform. Meanwhile, Steve doesn't want Betty Jo to strain herself, so he's making breakfast. Things do not go well. Uncle Joe learns from Sam that Ted will be returning to go over things with the girls. Joe can't return the advance Ted gave him, as he already spent it. Ted comes by the hotel and meets Billie Jo and Bobbie Jo. When Ted sees Betty Jo, he knows he has a problem. He has to produce the "Singing Sweethearts" or he's ruined. At the performance, the girls use some creative moves to hide Betty Jo's condition, but things don't go as planned. Betty Jo gives an explanation, they continue with their performance and the audience loves them. Kathryn Minner as Old Lady. Songs: "If You Could Only Be Me" and "Up, Up and Away" (again), both sung by Linda Kaye Henning, Lori Saunders and Meredith MacRae
173	3	"Only a Husband"	Ralph Levy	Charles Stewart & Dick Conway	October 19, 1968
Uncle Joe shows Steve a new fishing lure he invented. Steve says he can't go fishing because he's needed at home. But when he gets home, the sisters are talking about baby things and ignore Steve. Steve gets upset and leaves. Bobbie Jo thinks there's a real problem in the marriage and wonders if she should tell Kate. Steve comes back to apologize but then he's interrupted by Doc Stuart. At Sam's store, Sam tells Steve he wants to talk to Betty Jo and get a story about that baby of hers. Steve gets upset because everyone seems to forget it's his baby also. Steve goes home to have it out with Betty Jo, but she's sleeping. To get Steve out of feeling this way, Uncle Joe comes up with a plan for himself and Steve to "disappear". They go away fishing. This is supposed to result in Betty Jo and the rest of the family being worried to death about where they are. It's nightfall and no one has come looking for them. The girls figure Joe is sleeping and Steve is working. It starts to storm and the guys head back. The girls see the men soaking wet and start to pamper them. But then Dog comes in all wet and the girls go to him. Geoff Edwards as Jeff Powers. Song: Richard A. Whiting's "Sleepy Time Gal", sung by Mike Minor Note: This is the last episode that Bea Benaderet physically appears in prior to her death on October 13, 1968 although she does provide her voice in the later episode "The Valley Has a Baby".
174	4	"The Valley Has A Baby"	Ralph Levy	Charles Stewart & Dick Conway	October 26, 1968
Betty Jo tells Sam that the baby is due anytime. She also mentions that Kate is away talking care of a sick Aunt Ruth. Lisa Douglas comes by and learns that Betty Jo is pregnant. As Kate is away, Uncle Joe is presiding over the Every Other Wednesday Afternoon Discussion Club. Steve thinks it's a good idea if they move back to the Shady Rest until the baby comes. Wendell has been on around the clock watch for the last week keeping the train engine stoked. But it's taking a toll on his body. Betty Jo calls Billie Jo, who is out of town on a singing engagement. Betty Jo gets a very touching letter from Kate. She then flashes back to when she told Kate her and Steve were in love. And when Kate sees the cottage for the first time and when they got married. When Betty Jo finally goes into labor, they can't wake Wendell up. Betty Jo must run the Cannonball herself with Steve as the wood man. They wind up picking up Doc Stuart, Gladys Tuttle (Jean Vander Pyl), Selma Plout (Elvia Allman) and the Douglas'. Wendell wakes up and finds the Cannonball missing. Billie Jo arrives at the hospital. The Nurse tells everyone that Betty Jo had a baby girl. Wendell and Kate then arrive. Guest Stars: Eddie Albert and Eva Gabor as Oliver and Lisa Douglas from Green Acres. Note: Kate is said to be on a trip, "taking care of Aunt Ruth," although her voice is heard reading a letter and on the telephone; she appears in several touching flashbacks, and a stand-in (with Bea's voice) is seen from behind, pumping the handcar with Wendell and at Betty Jo's hospital bedside (again with voice-over from Bea). Wendel Gibbs appears.
175	5	"Granny, the Baby Expert"	Ralph Levy	Dick Conway	November 2, 1968
Betty Jo and the baby are coming home from the hospital. They'll be staying at the Shady Rest temporarily. Hearing that a doctor is coming from Beverly Hills, Billie Jo and Bobbie Jo are hoping that the doctor is a young, handsome, eligible bachelor. They are disappointed when Uncle Joe tells them the doctor is a woman. The doctor ends up being Granny (Irene Ryan), who is not what one would consider a traditional doctor. Granny has lost her glasses and mistakes Sam's store for the Shady Rest. Steve, Betty Jo and the baby arrive at the hotel. Betty Jo is quite worried about the baby and germs. Granny finally makes it to the hotel. Nearsighted Granny mistakes Dog for the baby. Granny meets Betty Jo and Steve. She is surprised that they are good looking, considering what the baby looks like. Billie Jo and Bobbie Jo help get the ingredients that Granny needs to make a cure for the baby. They think Granny is making an insecticide. Joe and Steve taste the medicine thinking it's soup, and regret that they did. Granny hopes the medicine will transform a dog-like baby into a baby-like baby. Sam brings Granny's glasses back. Steve misunderstands Granny and gives the medicine to Dog. When Granny is shown the baby, she believes she cured her. Note: This episode concludes a crossover with The Beverly Hillbillies that began on "Granny Goes to Hooterville".
176	6	"Wings"	Ralph Levy	Charles Stewart & Dick Conway	November 9, 1968
Sam tells everyone that Gus Huffle (Benny Rubin), the owner of the Pixley Bijou movie theater, has decided to close due to lack of business. Sam says that a big part of the problem is that Richard Arlen and Charles 'Buddy' Rogers were supposed to come to the Bijou for the world premiere of their Academy Award-winning Wings. There was a mix-up and they attended the premiere at the Roxy in New York City. Sam and Joe want to do something to help. Joe decides to write a nasty letter to Arlen and Rogers. Arlen and Rogers receive Joe's letter and discuss it with the Studio Executive (Robert Carson). Arlen and Rogers decide to attend a world premiere of the movie at the Pixley Bijou. Despite it being forty years late, it would be good publicity. Joe gets a telegram that they will arrive this Saturday. Sam, Mayor Potts (William Mims), Agnes Frisby (Jean Vander Pyl) and Selma argue over who will officially greet the guests. Billie Jo, Bobbie Jo and Joe greet Arlen and Rogers and apologize that there wasn't a bigger crowd. The community puts aside their differences and pulls out all the stops for the premiere. The festivities include a parade and musical performances. Guy Wilkerson as Gas Station Attendant. Dennis Fimple as Elwood. Wendel Gibbs appears
177	7	"The Lady Doctor"	Ralph Levy	Charles Stewart & Dick Conway	November 16, 1968
Doc Stuart is giving everyone flu shots and is having a hard time with Uncle Joe. Doc Stuart surprises them by announcing that he is going into semi-retirement. He will work part-time and is hiring a new young associate, who will arrive soon. Joe and Sam are worried about a young doctor. Doc Stuart is surprised when Dr. Janet Craig shows up. She tells him she didn't let it be known that she's a woman, because she figured she'd be turned down. Word spreads about Janet, and many of the older residents are not happy. Some of the wives don't want their husbands seeing a pretty woman doctor. Bobbie Jo and Billie Jo try to stick up for Janet. But Betty Jo is not so sure. Doc Stuart tells Janet he heard some of the women are going to boycott her. Janet says she likes a small rural town and wants to stay. Joe and Ben Miller (Hal Smith) come up with a plan to get rid of Dr. Craig. Ben tells Janet that his cow is about to give birth. She knows what Ben is trying to do and she stays with the cow. Doc Stuart tells Janet she can expect more calls like that. She says she's been fighting an uphill battle since she entered medical school. Note: June Lockhart makes her first of 45 appearances as Janet Craig, MD. Wendel Gibbs appears.
178	8	"The Sneaky Ways of a Woman"	Ralph Levy	Charles Stewart & Dick Conway	November 23, 1968
Uncle Joe is upset that Sam's headline in the newspaper is about Dr. Janet Craig. Joe would still like to get her to leave. He comes up with a plan to have him, Sam and Wendell give her the "old freeze". Meanwhile, Janet gets Steve to hold the baby without her crying. Janet mentions how she has no other patients to see. Wendell tries to give Janet the cold shoulder. But it doesn't last long when he finds out she knows a lot about trains as her father was a train engineer. Sam is the next to succumb to Janet's charms when she compliments him on the way he puts out the newspaper. Bobbie Jo tells Joe that Janet cooked the dinner. Joe pretends he doesn't like the meal, but he actually loves it. During the night, Joe sneaks down to the kitchen to get more of the food. Janet catches Joe and he tries to come up with an excuse. Janet knows she's winning him over. Sam and Wendell are now vying for Janet's attention. Joe sees this and asks them what happen to the big freeze. They know Joe has warmed up to Janet when she brings him some blueberry muffins. The men let Janet play cards with them. Wendel Gibbs appears.
179	9	"The Strange Case of Joseph P. Carson"	Ralph Levy	Dick Conway & Ben Gershman	November 30, 1968
Uncle Joe tells Sam and Wendell that Dr. Janet Craig is opening her office just off the lobby of the Shady Rest. She and Doc Stuart will split up the patients in the valley based on location. This means that Joe will have to go to her if he gets sick. Joe comes up with a plan to fake a disease that she can't cure. Hopefully no one will have any confidence in her and she'll have to leave. Joe loses a contest between the three of them, and he'll have to be the one. Bobbie Jo, Billie Jo and Steve are moving things into Janet's office. Joe uses ice and a heating pad to create his symptoms. Janet examines Joe and is a little bewildered. She goes to see Doc Stuart and he tells her that Joe has been known to fake illnesses. Stuart says Joe's probably doing it to make her look bad. He gives Janet some sugar pills to give to Joe. She brings the pills to Joe and he recognizes them as the ones Doc Stuart always gives him. He won't take them because he's worried they will make him feel better. Later, Joe tells Sam he really is sick. When Sam can't get a hold of Doc Stuart, he tells Janet about Joe. She goes to see Joe and he apologizes for trying to trick her. Joe does feels better, but he has a hard time admitting it was because of Dr. Craig. Note: Bea Benaderet is now out of the opening credits and for this episode the lyrics are "It's a real friendly place, come and be our guest (at the junction)." Wendel Gibbs appears.
180	10	"Bye, Bye, Doctor"	Ralph Levy	Charles Stewart & Dick Conway	December 7, 1968
A stranger in the valley is getting a shave at Bert's (Paul Hartman) barber shop. Uncle Joe and Sam wonder what a classy guy like that is doing around these parts. He winds up at the hotel looking for Dr. Craig. He tells Bobbie Jo and Billie Jo his name is Dennis Roberts (Dennis Morgan). It turns out he's an old friend of Janet's. Janet seems happy to see him, but is somewhat nervous about his visit. Dennis tries to get intimate with Janet and she's afraid he might ask her to marry him. The girls worry that if Janet marries Dennis, she'll have to leave the valley. Janet asks Dennis to give her time to think. Joe bluntly asks Dennis if he wants to marry Janet. Steve seems to be the only one not concerned about Janet possibly leaving. He brings up to the men that they initially didn't want Janet around. Steve thinks she has a right to do whatever she wants. No one wants to see Janet leave and they try to come up with plans to make her stay. Joe has Sam put on a toupee and try to woo Janet. The girls try to interrupt Janet and Dennis any time they're together. In the end, they decide to just tell her how they feel and that they'll respect any decision she makes. Janet stays in the valley. Songs: "I'm So Glad That You Found Me," sung by Linda Kaye Henning, Lori Saunders and Meredith MacRae. "Shine On, Harvest Moon" is sung by the main cast and guest star Dennis Morgan. Note: From this episode forward, June Lockhart is in the opening credits and the theme song lyrics have been changed to: "It is run by Joe, come and be his guest at the junction (Petticoat Junction); Here's our lady M.D., she's as pretty as can be, at the junction..."
181	11	"First Night Out"	Ralph Levy	Dick Conway & Ben Gershman	December 14, 1968
Steve got a bonus from his last crop-dusting job. Steve would like to take Betty Jo out on the town, but she doesn't want to leave the baby with a sitter. Steve is very disappointed. Dr. Craig comes by on a house call. She suggests that she, Uncle Joe and Bobbie Jo can look after Kathy Jo at the hotel. They arrive at the hotel with the baby and a long list of instructions. Jeff Powers comes by and reminds Bobbie Jo about an important date they have. Despite Betty Jo promising Steve she wouldn't worry about the baby, that's all she can think of. Mrs. Finch (Amzie Strickland) comes by with a medical emergency and Janet has to leave. Uncle Joe is left alone to look after the baby. Wendell comes by and tells Joe that Sam wants him at the store for a meeting about the water shed control bill. Joe decides to take the baby with. The meeting gets done early and the men play poker. Brisbane Snead (Harold Peary), the editor of the Pixley newspaper, arrives. He gets upset because he represents the opposing side and they didn't wait to hold the meeting until he got there. Snead goes and gets the Pixley Sheriff (Dave Willock) and shows him the card game. Janet and Bobbie Jo wind up at the Pixley jail. Janet finds a way to get Snead to drop the charges and gets Joe and the baby out before Steve and Betty Jo get home. Wendel Gibbs appears.
182	12	"A Cake from Granny"	Ralph Levy	Story by : John Stewart; Teleplay by : Charles Stewart	December 21, 1968
In Beverly Hills, Granny is looking at a picture of Steve, Betty Jo and baby Kathy Jo. Betty Jo reads a letter from Granny that says she will be sending them a cake. The Cannonball's arch enemy, Homer Bedloe, has arrived in the valley. Janet meets him and then they ride to the hotel. Bedloe won't tell Uncle Joe why he's there. Joe tells Sam that all Bedloe seems to be doing is riding the train. Sam and Joe believe that Bedloe is watching Wendell's performance to use as an excuse to scrap the Cannonball. They overhear Bedloe's call to the home office and learn he wants to put in a bus service for the valley. That would put the Shady Rest out of business as there is no road that goes by the hotel. Bedloe tries to get Janet to say something against the Cannonball. Janet comes up with the idea to use kindness in dealing with Bedloe's mean ways. They decide to throw Bedloe a birthday party. Meanwhile, Miss Jane is talking to Granny while she makes the cake. Granny puts some of her moonshine into the recipe. It's the night of the party and Bedloe has some of the cake. He winds up eating most of it and is feeling no pain. Bedloe changes his mind about getting rid of the Cannonball. The next day, Bedloe doesn't remember much of the night before, but he still intends on keeping the train. Sarah Selby as Nellie Hughes. Note: Charles Lane's final appearance as Homer Bedloe ends on a happy note, with him finally giving up his quest to shut down the Cannonball. Special Guest Stars from The Beverly Hillbillies: Irene Ryan as Granny and Nancy Kulp as Jane Hathaway Wendel Gibbs appears.
183	13	"The Feminine Mistake"	Ralph Levy	Joanna Lee	December 28, 1968
Bobbie Jo really likes a new book she is reading called "The Feminine Mistake". It talks about how women are denied what they could become in life. Because men force them into domestic lives rather than real careers. Bobbie Jo feels sorry for Betty Jo and her "stay at home" lifestyle. After Bobbie Jo asks Dr. Craig how she made the right career choice, she decides to look for a job. Meanwhile, Uncle Joe is trying to build a motorized bicycle so that he doesn't have to pedal. Bobbie Jo lies about her experience and gets a job at a beauty salon. Her first customer is Selma Plout and things do not go well. She then tries demonstrating products at the Pixley department store. Her first attempt ends in disaster and involves Selma again. Bobbie Jo talks Sam into letting her write for the paper. Bobbie Jo writes an article about Dr. Craig which makes it sound as though she looks down on the people of the valley. Sam reluctantly agrees to print it. The story causes an uproar in the valley. People start cancelling their appointments with Janet. A remorseful Bobbie Jo decides to sneak out of town. Janet catches her and says she leaving as well. On the Cannonball, Janet uses some reverse psychology to make Bobbie Jo understand her life in Hooterville. Bobbie Jo decides to stay, because she is the only one left to give a woman's touch to the Shady Rest.
184	14	"The Ballad of the Everyday Housewife"	Ralph Levy	Charles Stewart & Dick Conway	January 4, 1969
Bobbie Jo is babysitting Kathy Jo while Betty Jo is out shopping. She tries to talk to Steve, but he is preoccupied with paperwork. Betty Jo comes home and Steve barely notices. Bobbie Jo thinks Steve is ignoring Betty Jo and asks him when the last time he told her he loved her was. Feeling bad, Steve goes to tell Betty Jo how much he loves her. Betty Jo, who is busy gardening, doesn't pay too much attention to Steve. He leaves in a huff. Betty Jo learns from Bobbie Jo why Steve said those things. She wants to make it up to him. She goes to see him, but he's working on the plane engine. Things don't go as Betty Jo hoped. Bobbie Jo tells Janet that she's thinking about becoming a marriage counselor. When Bobbie Jo says she helped Betty Jo and Steve, Janet says she probably shouldn't have meddled. Lisa Douglas comes by and says she had a disagreement with Oliver. Something Lisa says gives Betty Jo an idea. Steve goes to see Sam wanting to buy a present for Betty Jo. He then goes to the hotel looking for her. Betty Jo comes back from the beauty parlor and the two make up. Benny Rubin as Mr. Garvey. Special guest star from Green Acres: Eva Gabor as Lisa Douglas; Song: "Dreams of the Everyday Housewife", sung by Mike Minor
185	15	"The Christening"	Guy Scarpitta	Charles Stewart & Dick Conway	January 11, 1969
Steve is trying to listen to the big boxing match on the radio, but Kathy Jo keeps crying. Betty Jo tells Steve that she has arranged with Reverend Barton (Frank De Vol) to hold Kathy Jo's christening this Sunday. Janet reminds Betty Jo and Steve that it is a custom to have godparents stand up during the christening. They only have a few days to decide who the godparents will be. They also know that whoever isn't chosen will be hurt or offended. Uncle Joe wants a nice hair cut from Bert Smedley (Olan Soule) because he thinks he'll be the godfather. Sam and Bert both think they have a chance. Wendell comes by and thinks it could be him. The men all lobby Steve to be the godfather. Janet tells Betty Jo that she was talking to Doc Stuart and he would like to be the godfather. Janet is honored when Betty Jo asks her to be godmother. But there's a catch, Betty Jo wants Janet to decide who will be godfather. Janet then asks the Reverend's advice. Joe, Sam, Wendell and Bert go and help the Reverend do some painting at the church. The Reverend comes up with the only choice that makes sense. All five men are the godfathers. Song: Mike Minor sings the Lord's Prayer. Wendel Gibbs appears.
186	16	"Billie Jo and The Big, Big Star"	Ralph Levy	Charles Stewart & Dick Conway	January 18, 1969
Bobbie Jo gets a letter from Billie Jo. She's coming back home from a gig in Omaha with a surprise. Janet tells Uncle Joe and Bobbie Jo that Sam is having a problem with the annual Hooterville charity radio show. It seems Selma Plout has learned to play the saxophone and wants to be the star. No one can bring themselves to tell Selma she isn't any good. Sam makes Janet the chairman of the entertainment committee. Billie Jo arrives with her new boyfriend, comedian Rick Wayne (Rich Little). Rick doesn't make a very good first impression. Billie Jo thinks that a good way for the valley residents to get to know Rick better is for him to star in the radio show. Billie Jo is surprised that no one has heard of Rick as he's a big star. Betty Jo has invited Billie Jo and Rick over for dinner. Steve finds Rick to be always "on". During the dinner, Rick is non-stop telling jokes. Billie Jo regrets asking Rick to be on the show when she hears a part of his routine, which is a put-down of the valley and its residents. Billie Jo asks Rick to change the names in his routine, but he says it works better to talk about locals. He even will do some impersonations. It's the night of the radio show. Sam introduces Rick. Rick says that rather than doing his routine, he's going to have Billie Jo sing. Apparently something Steve said to him was the reason Rick didn't perform. Song: Meredith MacRae sings "When I Fall in Love". Wendel Gibbs appears.
187	17	"Steve's New Job"	Ralph Levy	Charles Stewart & Dick Conway	January 25, 1969
Steve gets a letter offering him a lucrative job in New York City. Janet and Bobbie Jo don't think that Betty Jo will want to move. Steve tells Uncle Joe that the job offer is from his old Air Force commanding officer. Steve tells Betty Jo about the job and the move. Betty Jo tells Steve she'll go wherever he goes. But deep down, Betty Jo doesn't want to move. Steve tells Joe that he's taking the job. Steve has no use for his plane in New York, so Joe thinks he can find someone else to fly the plane. Joe tries to talk Wendell into flying the plane, but that doesn't work. Betty Jo would like the others to support Steve. Joe tries talking Sam into flying. Betty Jo tells Dog that she doesn't really want to move. Steve tells Kathy Jo that he doesn't want to leave Hooterville. Steve gets a telegram saying he's wanted in New York sooner than before. Steve tells Betty Jo he'll fly to New York and she can come later. Joe is in Steve's plane showing Elwood how it works. Joe does something wrong and the plane takes off. The plane crashes and Joe parachutes into the water tower. Steve decides to not take the job. Wendel Gibbs appears.
188	18	"The Cannonball Bookmobile"	Ralph Levy	Charles Stewart & Dick Conway	February 1, 1969
Bert and Sam are doing what they can to get Janet's attention. She asks them if they could greet a friend of hers who will be arriving soon. Janet has a medical emergency and won't be around. Janet's friend, Adelle Colby (Betty White), arrives in the valley. Sam, Bert and Uncle Joe are each attracted to her. Adelle, a librarian, is in the valley to open up a new library. They have the books and the money, but now need a location. The three men now do what they can to get Adelle's attention. Janet suggests a mobile library on the Cannonball. Sam, Bert and Joe do whatever they can to spend time aboard the mobile library with Adelle. The three friends start to get annoyed with each other. One day the Cannonball is really late. The three go looking for it. They find it and Wendell is reading a book to Adelle by a pond. The men give up on Adelle and Wendell spends more time with her. Song: Billie Jo sings an excerpt of "I Enjoy Being a Girl". Wendel Gibbs appears.
189	19	"A Man Called Cyrus Plout"	Ralph Levy	Charles Stewart & Dick Conway	February 8, 1969
Billie Jo, Bobbie Jo, Betty Jo and Sam are rehearsing a musical number for the annual Founder's Day celebration. Janet's idea is to have a musical tribute from then to now. The girls would be the featured performers. Selma, whose late husband's great great uncle Cyrus Plout founded Hooterville, thinks the idea isn't very dignified. Selma tells Uncle Joe that the Royal Order of the Camels, who are hosting this year's celebrations, should come up with something more dignified. The girls then do a go-go dance in mini-skirts, which gets Selma even madder. Despite kicking Selma out, Joe agrees that the mini-skirts are indecent. Joe and Steve get into an argument over what Joe said about the girls. Janet feels bad that her idea is causing such dissension. Janet thinks they should drop the go-go dance. Billie Jo thinks the younger people of the valley should have a say. The Royal Order of the Camels are holding a meeting when Janet comes in. They get upset because no outsider was supposed to see them in their robes. Janet wants them to consider the young people's desires. Joe still wants to keep things traditional. Henrietta Plout unwittingly comes up with an issue that breaks the stalemate and it involves Cyrus Plout and chorus girls. Note: Selma herself appears in a miniskirt by the end of the episode. Song: "Tell Me Pretty Maiden" from the musical Florodora is sung by Frank Cady, Linda Kaye Henning, Lori Saunders and Meredith MacRae in period costume. Wendel Gibbs appears.
190	20	"Joe Saves the Post Office"	Guy Scarpitta	Charles Stewart & Dick Conway	February 15, 1969
Some of the locals come by Sam's store to see what he calls major renovations to the Post Office. They don't turn out to be that major. Sam gets a letter from the government that says they are planning on shutting down his postal substation. Uncle Joe wants to come up with a way to save the Post Office. Bobbie Jo suggests that they have all the valley residents mail themselves something. That will show that there is a demand for that substation to stay open. But now Sam is so busy with the mail that he can't run the grocery. Joe takes a picture of all the mail and wants to show it to their Congressman. Joe is packing to go to Washington DC and Janet and Bobbie Jo decide to go with. They have no luck seeing Congressman Fenwick. They decide to do a little sightseeing. Joe recites from memory the Gettysburg Address during a visit to the Lincoln Memorial. Joe tears up the picture of the mail. At the White House, Joe frees a dog stuck in a fence. The White House Guard (Ray Kellogg) tells them that they were seen freeing the dog. He says the President would like to thank them personally. They meet an off-camera President Richard Nixon. Joe later tells Sam, the President supposedly said "Joe, old buddy, call me Dick..." Joe did mention the Post Office to the President. In the end, it turns out there was a mix-up and Hooterville's post office will stay open. Wendel Gibbs appears.
191	21	"I'm Allergic to Daddy"	Jean Yarbrough	Charles Stewart & Dick Conway	February 22, 1969
Janet tells Betty Jo that Kathy Jo's rash is all gone. She figures Kathy Jo was allergic to something that isn't around anymore. Steve returns from a week long business trip. It's not long and Kathy Jo's rash reappears. After giving it some thought, Janet suggests Steve temporarily move out of the house to see if the rash clears while he's away. Bobbie Jo moves in with Betty Jo. Gwendolyn Tucker (Amzie Strickland) calls a friend from Sam's store and tells her that Steve and Betty Jo have separated. The gossip spreads throughout the valley. Steve tells Sam there's no truth to the rumor. Steve goes to the house and learns that Kathy Jo's rash went away. He tells Betty Jo about the rumor. Steve suggests they be seen on a date together. Steve tells Janet that he's growing frustrated that he still can't go home. In the end, Janet figures out what is causing the rash and it isn't Steve.
192	22	"Uncle Joe Retires"	Ralph Levy	Charles Stewart & Dick Conway	March 1, 1969
Uncle Joe announces his retirement. But everyone he tells thinks he doesn't do anything anyway. Sam tells Bert and a farmer (Russ Bender) that he can't come up with any of Joe's accomplishments to put in the paper. Joe overhears the men laughing about him. Feeling unappreciated, Joe decides to run away. When Janet finds out he's leaving, she asks for his help with a case. Janet gets Billie Jo to tell Joe there's something wrong with the kitchen sink drain. Janet tells Joe they will be helpless when he's gone. Janet hopes to get some of the residents of the valley make Joe feel like he's needed. Joe figures out what everyone is up to and tries to get back at them. Janet decides to give Joe a retirement party. At the party, Sam presents Joe with a gold watch. Joe starts to feel needed and announces he won't retire. Wendel Gibbs appears.
193	23	"The Organ Fund"	Ralph Levy	Charles Stewart & Dick Conway	March 8, 1969
Reverend Barton has hired Freddie Kirby (Jack Sheldon), a professional fund-raiser, to raise money for their organ fund. The fund has $113 in it, and they need $2,000 for the new organ. Billie Jo and Bobbie Jo think Freddie is handsome and let him stay at the hotel for free. Uncle Joe is a little suspicious of Freddie. Freddie has brought with him a sample organ so everyone can see what they'll be getting. Freddie suggests several ways to raise the money. Freddie calls his boss Marco and tells him that the people follow whatever he suggests and they trust him with their money. It turns out that Freddie is a con artist. The fund raising is going well and they are almost at their goal. Freddie tells Janet that he's off to pick up the organ. She tells him that everyone thinks he's a noble hero. Freddie tells Marco that he can't go through with stealing the money. Marco wants to leave the church with an inferior second hand organ worth $20. Something Joe does gives Freddie the excuse to not cheat the people. Song: "The Fountain in the Park" a.k.a. "While Strolling Through The Park," sung by Mike Minor, Linda Kaye Henning, Lori Saunders, Meredith MacRae and guest star Jack Sheldon Wendel Gibbs appears.
194	24	"The Great Race"	Ralph Levy	Charles Stewart & Dick Conway	March 15, 1969
Hank Thackery (Jonathan Hole) is the owner of the Shady Rest's rival hotel, the Pixley House. He tells Uncle Joe and Sam that he plans to set up a jitney service between Pixley and Hooterville as an alternative to the Cannonball. That will put the Cannonball and the Shady Rest out of business. He will prove to the County Commissioner that his jitney can make better time. Hank bets Joe that he can be faster from Pixley to Hooterville than the Cannonball. The loser will bellboy at the other's hotel for a month. Joe's problem is getting Wendell into racing mentality. Joe wants to put oil on the Cannonball's wood to make it burn hotter. It's the day before the race and Hank comes by the hotel. Hank says he convinced the County Commissioner that the Cannonball's fate should depend on the outcome of the race. It's the day of the race and after the starter gun is fired, Wendell freezes up. The Cannonball eventually takes off. It doesn't get too far and then there's a cow on the tracks. There are a couple other delays, but thanks to Jug Gunderson's (Hal Smith) moonshine, the Cannonball wins. Sarah Selby as Mrs. Grundy. Wendel Gibbs appears.
195	25	"Tune in Next Year"	Ralph Levy	Charles Stewart & Dick Conway	March 22, 1969
Janet returns from a business trip with the news that she'll be leaving the valley. She has decided to work with the famous neurologist Dr. Pope. Janet was going to go into that field before she decided on general practice. The news hits everyone pretty hard and they try to think of a way to make her stay. Wendell tells Uncle Joe that Ted Thorsen, the forest ranger, has just injured his ankle. Wendell is taking Ted to see Janet and he needs Joe's help. Ted may provide a romantic reason for Janet to stay. Once he sees her, Ted is definitely interested in Janet. Ted is staying at the hotel while he recuperates. Janet tells Joe that if Ted's latest x-rays look good, she'll be leaving. Joe gets the x-rays from Wendell and everything looks fine. Bert has x-rays from his uncle they could substitute. When Janet sees that the x-ray is of a shoulder, she knows the men are up to something. Janet is just about to leave, when Steve and Betty Jo come by. They come up with a reason for Janet to stay. Note: This was meant to be the series finale. The episode ends with Betty Jo and Steve announcing that they're having another baby. At the last minute, CBS decided to renew the series for a seventh season because it would give the series five full seasons of color episodes for syndication, which would be very profitable for the network. When the show returned for its seventh and final season in September 1969, the storyline involving Betty Jo's pregnancy was dropped and never referred to again. Song: Mike Minor and Linda Kaye Henning sing a charming version of Frank Loesser's "No Two People (Have Ever Been so in Love)". Final Wendel Gibbs appearance.
196	26	"By the Book"	Ralph Levy	Charles Stewart & Dick Conway	March 29, 1969
Steve is working late into the night on a bid for a lucrative government contract. Meanwhile, Bobbie Jo tries to get Uncle Joe to start running as a form of exercise. Joe finds out that Steve is submitting the bid. Joe wonders why Steve didn't ask him for his advice on it. That night, Steve still hasn't heard whether he was awarded the contract. Joe rubs it in to Steve that he should have talked to him first. Steve gets mad at Joe and dissolves their partnership. Steve finally hears that he was awarded the contract. Steve is willing to make amends, but Joe figures Steve really doesn't need him. Sam tells Betty Jo and Billie Jo that Joe wants to run an ad in the paper announcing his split with Steve. Steve gets a telegram from a government official named William R. Blake (Kenneth Washington). It says to hold off signing the contract as there is a problem with it. Steve tells Betty Jo that Blake was an old Air Force nemesis of his. Steve plans to start the job before Blake arrives. The girls find out that Joe has rigged up a fake stationary bike with Dog doing the work. Blake shows up and Betty Jo radios Steve in the plane. Blake found an error in Steve's bid that will cost him a lot of money. Blake saves Steve by writing up a new contract with the correct numbers. Note: This episode #6.26 is out of order chronologically, with Bea Benaderet still in the opening credits but not appearing in the episode (up to No. 6.4), the character of Dr. Janet Craig having not yet arrived in Hooterville (#6.7), and Betty Jo still pregnant with Kathy Jo (#6.4). The episode actually takes place between season 6 episodes 3 and 4. The original broadcast of #6.3 was pre-empted and moved to the following week, when this episode was originally scheduled to air. The week after that was scheduled to be the birth of Betty Jo's baby (#6.4), and CBS didn't want to move that episode, so this one ended up being skipped. It finally aired at the end of the season.

=== Season 7 (1969–70) ===
No. overall	No. in season	Title	Directed by	Written by	Original release date
197	1	"Make Room for Baby"	Guy Scarpitta	Charles Stewart & Dick Conway	September 27, 1969
The girls are trying to teach Kathy Jo how to swim in a nearly empty water tower. Dog jumps in and the girls chase him away. Steve is moving his family's things into the Shady Rest. He finds out what the girls were doing and is against Kathy Jo learning to swim at her age. Billie Jo remembers that "Mom taught us to swim before we could walk" and Bobbie Jo adds "And in the same old water tower, too". Janet thinks it's a good idea. Dog is still wet and they tell him to get out of the hotel. More instances of Dog being chased away or ignored happen. Dog packs a knapsack and runs away from home. Dog winds up at Sam's store and the two sleep together. The next morning, the girls notice that Dog is missing. Uncle Joe comes by Sam's store looking for Dog, but now he's gone. A storm is coming and Dog runs into an old barn. The barn animals scare him out. Janet thinks that Dog is jealous of Kathy Jo. Dog runs into a Hobo (J. Pat O'Malley), who gives him some food. The Hobo wants to take Dog with him when he hops on a train, but Dog stays. Everyone is excited when Dog returns and they shower him with love. Song: "Moonlight Bay" sung by Mike Minor, Linda Kaye Henning, Lori Saunders and Meredith MacRae
198	2	"The Game Warden"	Elliott Lewis	Charles Stewart & Dick Conway	October 4, 1969
Uncle Joe and Sam are fishing. Joe is doing well, but Sam isn't. New game warden Orrin Pike (Jonathan Daly) gives Joe a ticket for catching too many trout. It doesn't matter that Joe was over the limit only because Sam gave him the two fish he caught. At the Hooterville train station, Orrin and Bobbie Joe catch each other's eye. They strike up a conversation. Just as Joe is telling Janet and Steve what he thinks of Orrin, Bobbie Jo and Orrin show up. At first, Joe is upset seeing Orrin. Joe thinks he may get out of the ticket by killing Orrin with kindness, but that doesn't work. Joe decides to fight the case in court. He tries to get Sam and then Steve to be character witnesses and basically lie. Joe tries a few other people with no luck. Bobbie Jo can't get Orrin to change his mind. It's the day of the court date. Bobbie Jo is going fishing with Orrin and will try and keep him out past the trial time. Judge Clayton (Charles Seel) comes by Sam's store where the trial will take place. Orrin realizes what time it is and gets to Sam's store with only a couple minutes to spare. Without Orrin knowing, Bobbie Jo put her fish in with his. The Judge tells Orrin that he's over the limit. Clayton only fines them $5 instead of the normal $50 and will give the money to charity.
199	3	"The Other Woman"	Elliott Lewis	Charles Stewart & Dick Conway	October 11, 1969
Steve has been away for three weeks on a job. Betty Jo and Kathy Jo get dressed up for a special homecoming for him. Betty Jo is a little disappointed that Steve is paying more attention to Kathy Jo than her. Later, while Betty Jo is hanging up laundry, Steve is flying with Kathy Jo. Janet can tell that Betty Jo feels left out. Janet suggests to Steve that he and Betty Jo go away for the weekend alone, a "second honeymoon". Steve says that he doesn't have the money. Janet tells him to use their cottage as it hasn't been sold yet. When they get to the cottage, they learn that the electricity is out. Steve thinks they should go back to the hotel, but Betty Jo says they can rough it. That night, Uncle Joe remembers he took all the fuses out at the cottage and wants to go put them back in. Janet tells him not to disturb the couple, but he does. Mr. Haney comes by with a couple to see the cottage. After a while Steve has had enough and kicks them out. Steve and Betty Jo are about to go to bed. Two homeless men, Stanley (Marvin Kaplan) and Oliver (Herbie Faye), let themselves in the cottage. Steve and Betty Jo confront the men. Then two more hobo's show up. Alice Nunn as Mrs. Birdwell. Special Guest: Pat Buttram as Mr. Haney from Green Acres.
200	4	"One of Our Chickens is Missing"	Elliott Lewis	Charles Stewart & Dick Conway	October 18, 1969
There have been several poachings in the valley. Bobbie Jo tells Sam that Orrin is on the trail of some poachers right now. In reality, Orrin has been searching for the poachers for a week. Uncle Joe notices one of his chickens is missing. Orrin and Bobbie Jo come across a pair of motorcyclists, Ringo (Harry Dean Stanton) and Buck (Jack Bannon). When Orrin finds a feather on one of the bikes, he suspects they are the poachers. But they manage to get away. Because of this and other complaints, Orrin is demoted. Janet tells Bobbie Jo that she needs to try and lift Orrin's spirits. Bobbie Jo has a plan, but it doesn't work out the way she hoped. Orrin has a chance to nab the poachers, but he needs to put some gas in his scooter. Bobbie Jo and Janet force Uncle Joe into helping Orrin get the poachers. Because Orrin actually put water in the tank of the scooter, he and Joe don't get far in their search. They are about to go after the poachers on foot when Ringo and Buck drive up. Ringo asks Orrin where the nearest gas station is. Joe tricks the two into using what is in Orrin's gas tank. The Sheriff is able to catch the two and Orrin gets his job back.
201	5	"The Three Queens"	Elliott Lewis	Charles Stewart & Dick Conway	October 25, 1969
Jack King (Harold Peary), the new local car dealer, introduces himself to Uncle Joe and Sam. Jack wants to take out a full page ad in the paper. He is holding a contest to find the prettiest girl in the valley and the grand prize is a trip to Los Angeles. Steve tells Orrin he should enter Bobbie Jo in the contest. Orrin learns that Jack wants a picture of the girl in a bathing suit. Betty Jo gets upset when she finds out Steve didn't enter her in the contest. Orrin is a little nervous about taking the picture of Bobbie Jo, but with her help, he does it. Steve tells Orrin that he entered Betty Jo. Steve is worried about the girls competing against each other. Steve would like Orrin to withdraw Bobbie Jo. Joe tells the men that he just entered Billie Jo. Billie Jo finds it a little weird to be entered by her Uncle. Steve would like Janet to talk to the girls about having a civil competition, but the girls just wind up fighting. Sam makes things even more complicated by entering Janet. Sam and Joe get into an argument over who is going to win. It's time for the winner to be picked. Janet comes up with a solution that will make everyone happy. She entered Kathy Jo, who wins. Virginia Sale as Myra King.
202	6	"The Glen Tinker Caper"	Elliott Lewis	Charles Stewart & Robert O'Brien	November 1, 1969
Glen Tinker (Glen Ash) had a very small country music career before being drafted to fight in Vietnam. He is now out of the military. Bobbie Jo is excited that he is coming to perform in Hooterville and stay at the Shady Rest. Expecting a slim handsome man, Bobbie Jo is a little surprised when Glen shows up. Janet meets Glen and asks him where he was stationed in Vietnam. She mentions that she is a member of the International Adoption Agency. Janet got a letter from the Agency saying a little four year old orphaned girl named Tami Kwong is missing from the adoption center. They suspect that someone in his army unit that was recently discharged abducted her. Glen says he knows nothing of Tami's whereabouts. Uncle Joe, Billie Jo and Bobbie Jo find out that Glen has Tami stashed in his duffel bag. It is obvious that the two want to be together. They ask why he just doesn't adopt her. Glen says that right now he can't provide a home and financial support, so he's sure he would be turned down. The Bradleys agree to help Glen keep Tami a secret. Glen gives his performance to an appreciative audience. He even gets a recording contract. Janet finds out about Tami and confronts Glen and the others. Janet says she'll have to report him. Judge Madison (Parley Baer) is presiding over the hearing. Janet has a change of heart and helps to convince the Judge to award custody of Tami to Glen.
203	7	"The Tenant"	Elliott Lewis	Charles Stewart & Dick Conway	November 8, 1969
Seductive female writer Jacqueline Moran (Leslie Parrish), author of "Sex Is Here to Stay", arrives at the Shady Rest. She is there to complete her latest novel. Everyone is surprised when she asks about Steve. Jacqueline says she is an old friend and he recommended the hotel to her. Steve doesn't recognize Jacqueline at first. She reminds him that she had met him at an air force base where he was doing some training last year. Steve was her base escort. Betty Jo is upset that he spent time with Jacqueline while she was pregnant with Kathy Jo. Steve winds up having to stay in Uncle Joe's room. The Bradley sisters try to make some distractions to encourage Jacqueline to leave, which she decides to do. Uncle Joe unwittingly ruins their plan by renting Jacqueline the cottage. Steve is glad but the girls aren't. Jacqueline continues to fawn over Steve. Jacqueline makes a phone call from Sam's store and he can't take his eyes off of her. Jacqueline's boyfriend Arthur Lewis (Frank Aletter) shows up and Billie Jo takes the opportunity to even the score. When Arthur and Billie Jo come home quite late, Jacqueline gets jealous and says they're going back to the city.
204	8	"Sorry Doctor, I Ain't Takin' No Shots"	Elliott Lewis	Charles Stewart & Dick Conway	November 15, 1969
To prevent a flu outbreak, Janet plans on providing a free shot to every single person in the valley. Nurses Billie Jo, Bobbie Jo and Betty Jo have to get used to poking a needle into people. At Sam's store, Newt Kiley (Kay E. Kuter) isn't interested in getting a shot until he sees Billie Jo in a sexy nurse's outfit. They manage to inoculate just about everyone in the valley. Janet says she had no luck with the back woods Tweedy family. She is concerned because the family has so many children. Janet and the girls talk a reluctant Uncle Joe into talking to Jasper Tweedy (Peter Whitney). Janet drives Joe to the Tweedy house. Jasper gets into a good mood when he starts to beat Joe at checkers. He doesn't know that Joe is letting him win. Jasper's son Claude sees Janet and asks him who she is. Jasper sees it's Janet and chases her and Joe off with his shotgun. Billie Jo and Bobbie Jo decide to give Claude a shot, figuring then Jasper will get one as well. After some sweet talk, Claude is ready for the shot, but then Jasper stops them. Then Janet has a reluctant Orin try to order Jasper to have the family get their shots. Jasper still refuses. Orin and Janet notice that the family dog, Gus, isn't feeling well. Janet gives Gus a shot. After Jasper sees how much better Gus is feeling, he allows the family to get their shots.
205	9	"A Most Momentous Occasion"	Elliott Lewis	Charles Stewart & Dick Conway	November 22, 1969
Uncle Joe complains to Janet that Steve has been in the bathroom that they share for almost an hour. It turns out Steve was in his room the whole time and the bathroom door was just jammed. Joe leaves Steve a note about staying out of the bathroom. Steve tells Betty Jo that he thinks they might be getting in the way. They go to the cottage and realize they would have to enlarge it if they were to move back in. After talking to Mr. Haney, they think he might not be the best real estate man. Despite that, they ask him about other listings. Billie Jo and Bobbie Jo don't want Steve and Betty Jo to move. But Billie Jo doesn't think they should interfere. They ask Janet what she thinks and she agrees with Billie Jo. Haney takes the couple to a real run down home, that he really talked up. Joe suggests building another bathroom in the hotel for Steve and Betty Jo. He hires Haney to put in the bathroom and Haney comes by with an outhouse. Joe says he'll put the bathroom in himself. After some time, there's an unveiling party at the hotel. While the bathroom looks nice, there are quite a few things that aren't right. Steve and Betty Jo decide to stay anyway.
206	10	"The Camping Trip"	Elliott Lewis	Charles Stewart & Dick Conway	November 29, 1969
The entire family is packing for their annual weekend camping trip. Bobbie Jo says she talked Orrin into coming along. Betty Jo tells Bobbie Jo it's a good chance to "work on" Orrin, as she wants to eventually marry him. Uncle Joe isn't thrilled about it and Bobbie Jo is a little sad at his reaction. Janet thinks this will be a good chance for Orrin to get on Joe's good side. The next morning, Joe gets upset when Orrin is a little late. The group arrives at the campsite. Joe gives everyone a job to handle except himself. No matter what Orrin does or says, it seems to annoy Uncle Joe. Joe hasn't caught any fish yet and Orrin comes by with a whole bunch of fish. That night the gang is singing by the campfire while Joe is sleeping. Orrin zips up Joe's sleeping bag so he doesn't get cold. The next morning, they can't get the bag unzipped. Steve suggests to Orin that he take Joe to his favorite fishing spot. But that doesn't go well. That night Joe wants to sleep away from the others. A bear comes by and is sniffing around where Joe is sleeping. The others hear the bear and go to find Joe. What seems like an act of cowardice by Orin, actually gets rid of the bear.
207	11	"Kathy Jo's First Birthday"	Elliott Lewis	Charles Stewart & Dick Conway	December 6, 1969
It's Kathy Jo's first birthday the following day. Billie Jo is out of town on a singing engagement. She was planning on making it back in time for the party, but Jack Stewart (Herbie Faye) says the club wants to extend her engagement. Billie Jo has to decide between her career and the party. The next morning, Steve is called back to redo a job he just finished because the insects are back. Uncle Joe takes Kathy Jo into Pixley to buy her a birthday present. Janet and her nursing assistant Bobbie Jo are called off on a medical emergency. In Pixley, Joe tells Kathy Jo that anything she picks, he will buy for her. Kathy Jo really likes a Chimpanzee she sees in a pet shop window. Meanwhile, Bobbie Jo tells Charlie Hanks (Karl Lukas) that his wife is having twins. Steve radios Betty Jo that he might be late to the party. Bobbie Jo tells Charlie there's a third baby. The Chimpanzee that Joe buys winds up taking a lady's (Alice Nunn) wallet and he gets arrested. Billie Jo makes it home because the owner of the club also has a 1 year old niece. Billie Jo tells Betty Jo that Sam has a last minute court case with a drunk. Charlie's wife winds up having three girls and a boy. Joe calls Sam and Sam is able to exchange prisoners with Sheriff Daly (John Cliff). Despite the delays, everyone does make it to the party. Note: The ice cream vendor is played by Buck Buchanan, the real-life son of Edgar Buchanan.
208	12	"Goodbye, Mr. Chimp"	Elliott Lewis	Charles Stewart & Dick Conway	December 13, 1969
Billie Jo and Bobbie Jo are doing some gardening in the front of the hotel. They try to get Uncle Joe to help, but that doesn't work. Joe has trained the chimpanzee he bought Kathy Jo to run errands for him. But the chimp is causing problems everywhere else in the hotel. The girls and Janet agree that the chimp has to go. Janet says that the problem is that Joe has become quite attached to the chimp. They volunteer Steve to be the one to tell Uncle Joe. Joe comes back from fishing and the chimp actually caught some fish. Joe gets the news from Steve and begrudgingly agrees to take the chimp to the children's zoo. But before Joe can get to the zoo, the chimp escapes and finds his way back to the hotel. Joe goes to Sam's store wanting to put in an ad in the paper for a home for the chimp. Traveling salesman Al (Herb Vigran) is there and says he will give the chimp a good home. Sam doesn't trust Al as he doesn't really know him. Al calls a friend who says he'll be able to sell the chimp. The next day Al puts the chimp in a cage and they leave on the Cannonball. When the train has to stop for a cow on the tracks, Dog catches up with it. Dog lets the chimp out of the cage and they head back to the hotel. Dog and the chimp get into Joe's bed while he's sleeping.
209	13	"The Golden Spike Ceremony"	Elliott Lewis	Charles Stewart & Dick Conway	December 20, 1969
Mallard P. Bradley was the girls' great-great-grandfather and founder of the Shady Rest and builder of the railroad between Hooterville and Pixley. Uncle Joe realizes that it will be the seventy-fifth anniversary of the completion of the railroad. Sam verifies the date by looking up an old newspaper. Joe feels there should be a special ceremony marking the anniversary. Joe brings in representatives from Pixley, Mayor Potts (Bartlett Robinson) and Hank Thackery (Jonathan Hole). Representing Hooterville will be Newt Kiley and Sam. The problem is Joe wants all the special moments of the ceremony for himself and an argument starts. They also argue over who will drive the golden spike. Bobbie Jo suggests Grandpa Miller (Walter Baldwin) as he was at the driving of the original last spike. At a practice ceremony, they try to explain to hard of hearing Grandpa Miller what he is to do. Joe eventually drives in the spike and strikes oil. Grandpa accidentally hits Joe in the head with the hammer. He fantasizes about the family driving to Beverly Hills in an old truck. Everyone makes plans with what to do with the money they will get. Mr. Henderson (Frank Wilcox), from the Tri-State Oil Company, informs everyone that they ruptured one of their pipelines. Harry Hickox as Mr. Ike Buell. Song: A rousing rendition of "Happy Days Are Here Again" is sung by most of the cast.
210	14	"But I've Never Been in Erie, PA"	Elliott Lewis	Charles Stewart & Dick Conway	December 27, 1969
Uncle Joe receives a registered letter from a law firm. The letter states that their client, a Mr. Herbert A. Smith (Rudy Vallee), who Joe doesn't know, has been looking for him. Joe goes to Madame Lavelle's (Rolfe Sedan) wig shop hoping to buy something to disguise himself. Joe buys a large fake beard. Everyone can see through Joe's disguise. When Smith arrives, Joe still doesn't know who he is. Smith repays Joe $50 that Joe supposedly lent him twenty years earlier in Erie, Pennsylvania. Smith tells everyone at the hotel how Joe helped him when he was down and out. Because of Joe's kind help, Smith has now become quite wealthy. Smith then tells of his business conglomerate, which has just issued public shares. Joe, not trusting Smith, thinks he wants Joe to invest in this fake business venture. But Smith says the shares are all accounted for. Now believing there is a real business, Joe tells Smith that he's willing to put up the deed to the hotel for some shares. Smith leaves with the deed. Joe finally remembers that he had never been in Erie. Joe catches up with Smith and gets the deed back. Smith says it was an honest mistake that he wasn't the Joe Carson he was looking for. Smith would still let Joe in on the deal, but Joe refuses. Steve finds a story in the paper about Smith's company stock hitting new highs.
211	15	"How to Arrange a Marriage"	Elliott Lewis	Charles Stewart & Dick Conway	January 3, 1970
Billie Jo is bringing her new friend, Jerry Roberts, to Hooterville. Bobbie Jo says she talked with Billie Jo on the telephone, and Billie Jo said she thinks she's in love. Betty Jo says that they should try and make a good impression. Before they arrive, Billie Jo tells Jerry that everyone back home is down to earth and that they all get along. When they arrive at Drucker's store, Uncle Joe and Sam are fighting. At the hotel, Steve and Betty Jo are also feuding. Billie Jo and Jerry arrive at the hotel and Dog attacks his leg. Steve and Betty Jo pretend to be happy when they meet Jerry. Orrin comes by with Uncle Joe. Joe asks Jerry what he does for a living and he says he's a musician. Steve makes some jokes about marriage and Betty Jo gets upset. Bobbie Jo and Orrin take Billie Jo and Jerry to see Steve and Betty Jo's cottage. Bobbie Jo really goes overboard with the talk of marriage. So much so, that a frightened Orrin says he can't get married yet. Billie Jo tells Janet that she has mixed feelings about what Bobbie Jo is doing. That night, Jerry mentions how nice everyone has been and he can't wait to tell his fiancé, Shirley. Later, Billie Jo gets a telegram from Jerry saying that Shirley is now his ex-fiancé. Note: New boyfriend Jerry is played by Meredith MacRae's at the time real-life husband Greg Mullavey. Song: Meredith MacRae sings "I'm Glad There Is You".
212	16	"Selma Plout's Plot"	Elliott Lewis	Charles Stewart & Dick Conway	January 10, 1970
Selma stops by the Shady Rest under the guise of seeing Janet. Betty Jo and Uncle Joe figure there's something else going on as Selma has never gone to Janet before. She is actually there to spread the news that Henrietta has a potential husband. Selma also says she has surprise for Joe. Everyone later learns that he is Ronnie Coleman (Jack Sheldon), a helicopter pilot. Selma brought him to the valley to set up a rival crop-dusting business to Steve's. While Steve is not thrilled having competition, he believes Ronnie has every right to start his business. Uncle Joe, Billie Jo and Bobbie Jo devise a plan to split up Ronnie and Henrietta in order to save Steve's business. Billie Jo and Bobbie Jo flirt and spend a lot of time with Ronnie. Janet tells the girls that their plan will ultimately hurt Henrietta. The girls tell Ronnie they won't be able to see him anymore. They talk up Henrietta, but Ronnie says she's just to plain for him. To help Henrietta win over Ronnie, Billie Jo and Bobbie Jo give her a makeover. A pretty Henrietta now wants to play the field, so Ronnie decides to leave. Song: "Talk to the Animals", sung by guest star Jack Sheldon.
213	17	"With This Ring"	Elliott Lewis	Charles Stewart & Dick Conway	January 17, 1970
While in Pixley, Betty Jo and Steve see Orrin in a jewelry store buying what looks like an engagement ring. Betty Jo is surprised because Orrin has said that he couldn't get married until he got at least one more pay raise. They tell Uncle Joe what they saw and he is not happy. Joe says he'll do anything he can to keep those two apart. Orrin comes by and does something to irritate Joe. Orrin tells Bobbie Jo that he got the raise he wanted and wants to celebrate with the entire family. The family thinks that at the party he will propose. Meanwhile, burly farmer Merlin Fergus (Merlin Olsen) comes into town and tells Sam he's looking for a wife. Joe hopes to match Merlin and Bobbie Jo together. At the hotel, Joe goes to find Bobbie Jo. Merlin first sees Janet and tells her how good looking she is. Merlin then sees Billie Jo. Joe shows up with Bobbie Jo, but Merlin says he wants to marry Billie Jo. She says no. It's the night of the party. Everyone is surprised when they find out why Orrin bought a ring. Merlin comes by and Orrin gives him the ring to give to a girl named Lydia. Bobbie Jo tells the others she's not disappointed because she still has Orrin. Songs: Steve and Betty Jo sing "Love and Marriage" and the girls sing "One Boy" from Bye Bye Birdie.
214	18	"The Valley's New Owner"	Elliott Lewis	Charles Stewart & Dick Conway	January 24, 1970
Orrin brings Bobbie Jo home very late from a date. He's afraid to walk her to the door in case someone is still up, but Bobbie Jo talks him into it. Believing everyone is asleep, she gets Orrin to come inside. Uncle Joe yells at him and forbids Orrin from seeing Bobbie Jo anymore. The next day, Orrin comes by and says he's decided to leave the valley for good, which devastates Bobbie Jo. Orrin gives everyone some family heirlooms as farewell gifts. Among the gifts, Janet finds a deed which makes Orrin the owner of the entire valley. Mayor Potts (William Mims) and Sam insist Uncle Joe apologize to Orrin, who can now control what happens in the valley. Joe insists that Orrin stay at the hotel rent free. Orrin feels funny about all the attention he is getting. Bobbie Jo reminds him that he owns the valley. Steve can't believe that Joe is waiting on Orrin hand and foot. Mayor Potts tells Steve they are going to put up a statue of Orrin in the town square. Orrin starts to get used to his new found power and it goes to his head. That night, they're having a party for Orrin. Janet wants to talk to Orrin in private. Janet tells him that the deed is worthless because it was signed during the Confederacy. She comes up with a plan to make Orrin look good in the eyes of all. Orrin tears up the deed. Song: A rousing rendition of "Hooterville" sung to the tune of Camelot, performed by Mike Minor and Linda Kaye Henning
215	19	"Steve's Uncle George"	Elliott Lewis	Charles Stewart & Dick Conway	January 31, 1970
On the Cannonball, Floyd Smoot (Rufe Davis) is trying to guess a stranger's occupation. It turns out the man is Steve's Uncle George (Don Ameche), who is coming to the Shady Rest for a visit. Everyone at the hotel is excited about his visit except Steve. He says Uncle George is a nice guy but, without knowing it, he always ends up causing trouble. Everyone finds George to be nothing but a charming man. George wants to see the countryside and takes Kathy Jo for a walk. Just as Steve predicted, everyone soon starts fighting with everyone else. That night, Janet is supposed to go to a dance with Sam, but she's entertaining George. Sam and Janet get into a fight. Later that night, George brags about how many women used to chase Steve, which doesn't sit well with Betty Jo. At bed time, Betty Jo and Billie Jo get mad at Steve when he confuses who he said "I love you" to first. Right then, Steve decides to put an end to the fighting by asking Uncle George to leave. But before Steve can say anything, George tells Steve he had a lovely visit, but it's time to move on. George wants to leave quietly in the morning and have Steve say his goodbyes for him. Note: Rufe Davis' penultimate performance as the Cannonball's Floyd Smoot, his first appearance since Season 5.
216	20	"Susan B. Anthony, I Love You"	Elliott Lewis	Charles Stewart & Dick Conway	February 7, 1970
Billie Jo has been away in Chicago with Jerry Roberts for six weeks. She returns home an emancipated woman, equal to any man and even wearing a man's suit. She tries to explain that women are repressed in society and they need to fight back. The ladies agree to some of the things Billie Jo says, but not all of it. Janet wants to know what Jerry thinks of this. Billie Jo hints that they had a falling out. All the men believe Billie Jo's new attitude is hogwash. She even tries to invade the Bert Smedley's (Frank Ferguson) barber shop. But that plan doesn't pan out when the men all light up a cigar and Bert is about to give her a shave. An angry Billie Jo says she's going to organize all the women in the valley and hold a rally. Bobbie Jo tries to take Billie Jo's advice on her date with Orrin, but things don't work out as she expected. Betty Jo thinks there may have been a disagreement with Jerry that started this all. After Steve and Betty Jo have an argument, she decides to join up with her sister. The women force Sam to let them hold their rally at his store. Bobbie Jo and Betty Jo get dressed in suits. But before the rally can happen, Billie Jo apparently makes up with Jerry and is back to her old self.
217	21	"Spare That Cottage"	Elliott Lewis	Charles Stewart & Dick Conway	February 14, 1970
A Norbert Thompson (Robert Rockwell) checks into the hotel. Uncle Joe and Sam are trying to figure out what he does for a living. Steve comes by and says Thompson is with the Highway Commission. The Commission is planning on constructing a new road through the valley. He is there to pick which route it will take. Steve tells Joe that there could be some land speculation based on figuring out where the new route goes. Joe tries to convince all the residents of the valley to let him act on their behalf to get the best deal. Sam figures out that Joe is doing this because, no matter where the road goes, he gets a commission. Only a few go along with the plan. Thompson decides that the road will go through Steve and Betty Jo's property. Steve is looking forward to getting the money. Wanting Joe to feel useful, Steve says that he can make the deal with Thompson. Betty Jo, Bobbie Jo and Janet become upset when they learn that the honeymoon cottage will be torn down. Uncle Joe ruins the deal by asking too much for the land, but the girls are thrilled. Stuart Wilson as Ben Miller. Song: "When I'm Sixty-Four", sung by Mike Minor
218	22	"Whiplash, Whiplash"	Elliott Lewis	Charles Stewart & Dick Conway	February 28, 1970
Uncle Joe buys a bunch of stuff at the church rummage sale. Bobbie Jo and Billie Jo point out that most of it is junk. With Dog's help, Joe puts up a hammock he bought at the sale. Selma comes by the hotel. She tells Billie Jo and Bobbie Jo that Henrietta went off to charm school. Selma wants Joe to take a picture of her sitting on the hammock. The hammock breaks and Selma winds up on the ground, claiming she has whiplash and a back injury. Because Henrietta is away, the girls and Janet have Selma stay bedridden at the hotel. Janet couldn't find anything wrong with her, but they don't want to take any chances. Selma becomes a very demanding guest. Joe believes that Selma plans on suing when there's a letter to a lawyer to be mailed. Joe and Sam go to consult a lawyer. But, not knowing who he is at first, they wind up speaking to Timothy T. Temkin (Buddy Lester), the lawyer that Selma contacted. Things start to look bad and Joe is worried. Henrietta comes back from the school. Thanks to something Henrietta reveals, Selma no longer has a case. Note: Elvia Allman shines in her final appearance as the Shady Rest's nemesis Selma Plout. Also the final appearance of her daughter, Henrietta (Lynette Winter).
219	23	"Last Train to Pixley"	Elliott Lewis	Charles Stewart & Dick Conway	March 7, 1970
Floyd is retiring, so the people need to find another engineer to run the Cannonball. Uncle Joe volunteers, despite having limited experience doing the job. Joe says he will adhere to a rigid schedule. The people in the valley are not used to this. It angers many of them who missed the train or who Joe wouldn't pick up at non-designated stops. Many of the residents are at the hotel to complain. Joe arrives and Steve has to protect him from the angry mob. Mr. Bellingham (Parley Baer), from the C & FW Railroad, tells the people that Floyd's retirement also means the Cannonball will be sold as a tax write off. To save the Cannonball, they need to find a missing document that has the agreement between the railroad and the people of the valley. While taking what they think is a last ride, the gang shares favorite memories of the Cannonball. Mr. Benton (Percy Helton) puts a pile of wood on the tracks forcing Joe to stop. Sam finds the document when it fell out of the luggage rack. Thanks to a technicality in the document that Janet finds, the Cannonball stays. The people of the valley wrote Floyd and begged him to come out of retirement, which he does. Turns out that Joe was the first one to write Floyd. Sarah Selby as Mrs. Frisby. (The travel time between Hooterville and Pixley is listed as two hours.) Song: "Steam, Cinders and Smoke", sung by Rufe Davis in his final appearance on the show
220	24	"Love Rears Its Ugly Head"	Elliott Lewis	Charles Stewart & Dick Conway	March 21, 1970
Billie Jo returns from another trip to Chicago. While there, she attended several lectures from Prof. Richard von Bremerkamp about the New Age sensory awareness movement. Billie Jo tries to explain touch therapy techniques, that spread the message of love, to her sisters. Steve and Uncle Joe think this is just Billie Jo's latest weirdo fad. Orrin comes by and the girls try to get him involved. They think he's making fun of them and they kick him out. Trying to get the men to understand is causing a strain between Steve and Betty Jo, and Orrin and Bobbie Jo. One night, Orrin and Bobbie Jo are outside on a bench. Bobbie Jo wants Orrin to experience a rock by holding it to his eyelid. Game Warden Horton Hughes (Roy Roberts) comes by and asks Orrin what he's doing. Steve winds up sleeping on the couch in the hotel lobby. The men decide they don't want to escalate the problems. They hope to defuse the issue by joining a group awareness session. But things do not go well. Janet ends up being the voice of reason by saying the valley is already full of love. Song: "The Impossible Dream", sung by Mike Minor Note: This was Jonathan Daly's final appearance in the series.
221	25	"No, No, You Can't Take Her Away"	Elliott Lewis	Charles Stewart & Dick Conway	March 28, 1970
When Janet gets her hair done and buys some new clothes, the girls know a man is involved. Janet tells the girls and Steve that Dr. Peter Marlow (Keith Andes), an old friend from her medical school days, is coming to visit. Peter arrives and meets everyone. Peter has come to ask for Janet's hand, but instead of staying in Hooterville, he wants to take Janet to his home in Hawaii. The girls start to worry about the prospect of losing Janet. Bobbie Jo volunteers to break Janet and Peter up. But instead, she winds up agreeing to help Peter talk Janet into moving. Betty Jo and Steve think that Kathy Jo may be able to sway Janet, but Janet is on to their scheme. Janet tells them that she is working on getting a replacement. Janet is torn between her feelings for Peter and her love for the lifestyle of Hooterville. She can't give Peter an answer just yet. It takes an effort, but the gang tells Janet that they just want her to be happy no matter what she decides. Janet makes up her mind based on where her heart truly lies and she turns Peter down. Songs: "I Can Sing a Rainbow," sung by Mike Minor and "Let Me Call You Sweetheart," sung by Edgar Buchanan, Linda Kaye Henning, Mike Minor, Lori Saunders and Meredith MacRae
222	26	"Betty Jo's Business"	Elliott Lewis	Charles Stewart & Dick Conway	April 4, 1970
It's late at night and Steve is worried about the family finances. His business is doing fine, but many of his customers are behind on payments while his suppliers want their money. Betty Jo tells Steve to demand payment from his customers. The next morning Betty Jo has second thoughts when she realizes many of the customers are friends. Steve doesn't have any luck getting the money. Betty Jo thinks that the best way to solve their money problem is for her to get a job. Janet and Billie Jo think she has enough to do being a wife and mother. As she's looking after Kathy Jo anyway, she figures the perfect job would be to open a daycare at the hotel. She decides to not tell Steve. Betty Jo puts an ad in the local paper. Janet thinks Betty Jo should tell Steve. Joe accepts a goat instead of cash from one of Steve's customers. Betty Jo, with the help of her sisters, has a lot of children under her care and all seem happy. When Steve comes home early, Bobbie Jo hides all evidence of the babies, including the babies themselves. Steve knows that something isn't quite right and eventually finds out about the daycare. The mothers come to pick up their babies and are furious to find them hidden in a cabinet. Steve is also mad, but something Kathy Jo does calms him down. Nora Denney as Mrs. Graham. Nora Marlowe as Mrs. Hughes. Note: Byron Foulger, who played train engineer Wendell Gibbs in season six, died the same day this final episode of the series aired.
