= List of TV Guide covers (1960s) =

This is a list of covers of issues of TV Guide magazine for the decade of the 1960s, from January 1960 to December 1969. The entries on this table include each cover's subjects and their artists (photographer or illustrator). This list is for the regular weekly issues of TV Guide; any one-time-only special issues are not included.

== 1960 ==
Issue date	Cover subject	Type of cover	Artist
1960-01-02	James Arness, Amanda Blake, Dennis Weaver & Milburn Stone of Gunsmoke		
1960-01-09	Jane Wyatt & Elinor Donahue of Father Knows Best		
1960-01-16	Cliff Arquette as Charley Weaver		
1960-01-23	Kathy Nolan & Walter Brennan of The Real McCoys		
1960-01-30	Garry Moore		
1960-02-06	Richard Boone of Have Gun, Will Travel		
1960-02-13	Craig Stevens & Lola Albright of Peter Gunn & John Vivyan & Pippa Scott of Mr. Lucky		
1960-02-20	Red Skelton		
1960-02-27	Robert Stack of The Untouchables	Photograph	Phillipe Halsman
1960-03-05	Jay North of Dennis the Menace		
1960-03-12	Chuck Connors of The Rifleman		
1960-03-19	Raymond Burr & Barbara Hale of Perry Mason	Photograph	Sherman Weisburd
1960-03-26	Donna Reed		
1960-04-02	Tennessee Ernie Ford		
1960-04-09	Efrem Zimbalist Jr. of 77 Sunset Strip		
1960-04-16	Ann Sothern	Photograph	Philippe Halsman
1960-04-23	Cast of Laramie		
1960-04-30	June Lockhart, Jon Provost & Lassie		
1960-05-07	Elvis Presley & Frank Sinatra	Illustration	Austin Briggs
1960-05-14	Ernie Kovacs & Edie Adams of Take A Good Look	Photograph	Phillipe Halsman
1960-05-21	Gene Barry of Bat Masterson		
1960-05-28	Poncie Ponce & Connie Stevens of Hawaiian Eye		
1960-06-04	Darren McGavin of Riverboat		
1960-06-11	Noreen Corcoran, John Forsythe & Sammee Tong of Bachelor Father	Photograph	Ken Whitmore
1960-06-18	Gardner McKay of Adventures in Paradise	Photograph	Sherman Weisburd
1960-06-25	Cast of Bonanza		
1960-07-02	Lawrence Welk		
1960-07-09	David Brinkley & Chet Huntley	Photograph	Phillipe Halsman
1960-07-16	Lucille Ball		
1960-07-23	John Charles Daly of What's My Line?		
1960-07-30	Ruta Lee & Michael Connors of Tightrope!		
1960-08-06	Esther Williams	Photograph	Lawrence Fried
1960-08-13	Nick Adams of The Rebel		
1960-08-20	Betsy Palmer of I've Got a Secret		
1960-08-27	Cast of 77 Sunset Strip		
1960-09-03	Arlene Francis of What's My Line?		
1960-09-10	Dick Clark of American Bandstand		
1960-09-17	June Allyson & Dick Powell		
1960-09-24	Fall Preview		
1960-10-01	Dinah Shore		
1960-10-08	Arthur Godfrey		
1960-10-15	Marion Lorne & Carol Burnett of The Garry Moore Show	Photograph	Curt Gunther
1960-10-22	Debbie Reynolds		
1960-10-29	Danny Kaye		
1960-11-05	Loretta Young		
1960-11-12	Fred MacMurray of My Three Sons	Photograph	
1960-11-19	Ward Bond of Wagon Train	Photograph	
1960-11-26	Cast of Hennesey		
1960-12-03	Shirley Temple	Photograph	
1960-12-10	Amanda Blake of Gunsmoke	Photograph	
1960-12-17	Sebastian Cabot, Anthony George & Doug McClure of Checkmate	Photograph	Max Yavno
1960-12-24	Christmas		
1960-12-31	Dorothy Provine of The Roaring Twenties		

== 1961 ==
Issue date	Cover subject	Type of cover	Artist
1961-01-07	Richard Boone of Have Gun Will Travel		
1961-01-14	Perry Como		
1961-01-21	Barbara Stanwyck		
1961-01-28	Andy Griffith & Ronny Howard of The Andy Griffith Show	Photograph	Richard R. Hewett
1961-02-04	Eric Fleming & Clint Eastwood of Rawhide	Photograph	Russ Halford
1961-02-11	Lola Albright & Craig Stevens of Peter Gunn		
1961-02-18	Nanette Fabray		
1961-02-25	Dorothy Collins, Allen Funt & Arthur Godfrey of Candid Camera	Photograph	Sherman Weisburd
1961-03-04	Raymond Burr of Perry Mason	Photograph	Yousuf Karsh
1961-03-11	Robert Stack of The Untouchables		
1961-03-18	Marjorie Lord of The Danny Thomas Show		
1961-03-25	Alfred Hitchcock	Photograph	Yousuf Karsh
1961-04-01	Roger Smith of 77 Sunset Strip		
1961-04-08	Lori Martin & King of National Velvet		
1961-04-15	Mitch Miller		
1961-04-22	Garry Moore		
1961-04-29	Rod Taylor of Hong Kong		
1961-05-06	Donna Reed		
1961-05-13	Lorne Greene of Bonanza		
1961-05-20	Walter Brennan & Richard Crenna of The Real McCoys		
1961-05-27	Ronald Reagan of General Electric Theater & Dorothy Malone	Photograph	Todd Walker
1961-06-03	Paul Burke & Horace McMahon of The Naked City	Photograph	
1961-06-10	Nanette Fabray & Efrem Zimbalist Jr.		
1961-06-17	Lawrence Welk		
1961-06-24	John McIntire & Robert Fuller of Wagon Train		
1961-07-01	The Flintstones & Barney & Betty Rubble	Illustration	Hanna-Barbera Productions
1961-07-08	Harry Morgan & Cara Williams of Pete and Gladys		
1961-07-15	Gardner McKay of Adventures in Paradise		
1961-07-22	Martin Milner & George Maharis of Route 66		
1961-07-29	Bob Keeshan of Captain Kangaroo		
1961-08-05	Fred MacMurray, William Frawley & Stanley Livingston of My Three Sons	Photograph	Bath-Long
1961-08-12	"The World of Soap Opera"	Illustration	Stanley & Janice Berenstain
1961-08-19	Troy Donahue of Surfside 6		
1961-08-26	Hugh Downs		
1961-09-02	Dwayne Hickman & Bob Denver of The Many Loves of Dobie Gillis		
1961-09-09	Sebastian Cabot, Anthony George & Doug McClure of Checkmate		
1961-09-16	Fall Preview		
1961-09-23	Mitch Miller	Photograph	Philippe Halsman
1961-09-30	Carol Burnett		
1961-10-07	Walter Cronkite of CBS Reports & Dwight D. Eisenhower		
1961-10-14	Red Skelton	Illustration	René Bouché
1961-10-21	Joe E. Ross & Fred Gwynne of Car 54, Where Are You?		
1961-10-28	"This is the Week to Watch"		
1961-11-04	Dorothy Provine of The Roaring Twenties		
1961-11-11	Mr. and Mrs. Robert Stack		
1961-11-18	Garry Moore, Durward Kirby & Marion Lorne	Photograph	George Joseph
1961-11-25	Amanda Blake & James Arness of Gunsmoke	Photograph	
1961-12-02	Joey Bishop		
1961-12-09	Mary Tyler Moore & Dick Van Dyke of The Dick Van Dyke Show	Photograph (This was also the week that Van Dyke hosted the 1961 telecast of The Wizard of Oz)	
1961-12-16	Raymond Massey & Richard Chamberlain of Dr. Kildare		
1961-12-23	Christmas		
1961-12-30	Cynthia Pepper of Margie	Photograph	Gene Trindl

== 1962 ==
Issue date	Cover subject	Type of cover	Artist
1962-01-06	Vince Edwards of Ben Casey	Photograph	
1962-01-13	Shirley Booth & Bobby Buntrock of Hazel with friend	Photograph	
1962-01-20	Chuck Connors of The Rifleman	Photograph	Todd Walker
1962-01-27	Myrna Fahey of Father of the Bride	Photograph	
1962-02-03	Mark Richman of Cain's Hundred	Photograph	
1962-02-10	Jacqueline Kennedy	Photograph	Mark Shaw
1962-02-17	Danny Thomas	Photograph	
1962-02-24	Troy Donahue of Surfside 6	Photograph	Julian Wasser
1962-03-03	Raymond Burr & Barbara Hale of Perry Mason	Photograph	Gene Trindl
1962-03-10	Jack Paar	Illustration	Al Hirschfeld
1962-03-17	E. G. Marshall & Robert Reed of The Defenders	Photograph	Curt Gunther
1962-03-24	Dick Powell	Photograph	
1962-03-31	Alan Young & Mister Ed	Photograph	Richard R. Hewett
1962-04-07	John McIntire of Wagon Train	Photograph	
1962-04-14	George Maharis & Martin Milner of Route 66		
1962-04-21	Connie Stevens of Hawaiian Eye	Photograph	
1962-04-28	Ron Harper & Robert Lansing of 87th Precinct	Photograph	
1962-05-05	Sheila James & Dwayne Hickman of The Many Loves of Dobie Gillis	Photograph	
1962-05-12	Don Knotts of The Andy Griffith Show	Photograph	
1962-05-19	Paul Burke of Naked City	Photograph	Al Wertheimer
1962-05-26	Fred MacMurray & Stanley Livingston of My Three Sons	Photograph	
1962-06-02	Mary Tyler Moore of The Dick Van Dyke Show	Photograph	Julian Wasser
1962-06-09	Efrem Zimbalist Jr. of 77 Sunset Strip	Photograph	
1962-06-16	Raymond Massey & Richard Chamberlain of Dr. Kildare	Photograph	
1962-06-23	Arlene Francis of What's My Line?	Photograph	George Joseph
1962-06-30	Mitch Miller et ux	Photograph	
1962-07-07	David Brinkley	Photograph	Mort Schreiber
1962-07-14	Sebastian Cabot & Anthony George of Checkmate	Photograph	Ivan Nagy
1962-07-21	Donna Reed	Photograph	
1962-07-28	Bill Cullen of The Price Is Right with contestant Barbara Benner	Photograph	Curt Gunther
1962-08-04	Gale Gordon & Jay North of Dennis the Menace	Photograph	Gene Trindl
1962-08-11	Robert Stack of The Untouchables	Photograph	Gene Trindl
1962-08-18	Cast of I've Got a Secret	Photograph	Bob Henriques
1962-08-25	Lawrence Welk	Photograph	
1962-09-01	Connie Stevens & Troy Donahue	Photograph	
1962-09-08	Lorne Greene, Michael Landon & Dan Blocker of Bonanza	Photograph	
1962-09-15	Fall Preview		
1962-09-22	Vince Edwards of Ben Casey	Photograph	
1962-09-29	Lucille Ball	Photograph	Philippe Halsman
1962-10-06	Shirley Booth & Don DeFore of Hazel	Photograph	Gene Trindl
1962-10-13	Jackie Gleason	Illustration	Al Hirschfeld
1962-10-20	Loretta Young	Photograph	Frank Bez
1962-10-27	Richard Rust & Edmond O'Brien of Sam Benedict	Photograph	George Long
1962-11-03	Stanley Holloway of Our Man Higgins	Photograph	
1962-11-10	Donna Douglas, Max Baer Jr., Irene Ryan & Buddy Ebsen of The Beverly Hillbillies	Photograph	
1962-11-17	Jack Lord of Stoney Burke	Photograph	
1962-11-24	"The World of Jacqueline Kennedy"	Photograph	Jacques Lowe
1962-12-01	Marty Ingels & John Astin of I'm Dickens, He's Fenster	Photograph	Zinn Arthur
1962-12-08	Dick Van Dyke	Photograph (The week that Van Dyke hosted the 1962 telecast of The Wizard of Oz)	Larry Schiller
1962-12-15	Zina Bethune & Shirl Conway of The Nurses		
1962-12-22	Christmas		Design: Frank Eltonhead Photo: John Bodziak
1962-12-29	Edie Adams		

== 1963 ==
Issue date	Cover subject	Type of cover	Artist
1963-01-05	Bettye Ackerman, Vincent Edwards & Sam Jaffe of Ben Casey	Photograph	Julian Wasser
1963-01-12	Arnold Palmer	Photograph	Russ Halford
1963-01-19	Joe E. Ross & Fred Gwynne of Car 54, Where Are You?	Photograph	Philippe Halsman
1963-01-26	George Maharis & Martin Milner of Route 66	Photograph	Bob Towers
1963-02-02	Jack Webb	Photograph	Bob Vose
1963-02-09	Ernest Borgnine	Photograph	
1963-02-16	Princess Grace	Photograph	Phillipe Halsman
1963-02-23	Carol Burnett	Illustration	Morr Kusnet
1963-03-02	Wendell Corey & Jack Ging of The Eleventh Hour	Photograph	Bob Vose
1963-03-09	Donna Douglas & Buddy Ebsen of The Beverly Hillbillies	Photograph	Bob Vose
1963-03-16	Richard Chamberlain of Dr. Kildare	Photograph	
1963-03-23	Andy Williams	Photograph	
1963-03-30	*Michael Landon, Dan Blocker, Lorne Greene & Pernell Roberts of Bonanza; *An alternate April Fools cover featuring Bullwinkle feather-tickling a "friend" (Vince Edwards)	Photograph	Leo Fuchs (Bonanza cover)
1963-04-06	Lucille Ball (TV Guide's 10th anniversary)	Photograph	
1963-04-13	Richard Egan of Empire	Photograph	Zinn Arthur
1963-04-20	Red Skelton	Photograph	Gene Trindl
1963-04-27	William Talman & Raymond Burr of Perry Mason	Photograph	Leo Fuchs
1963-05-04	Roberta Shore, Lee J. Cobb & James Drury of The Virginian	Photograph	
1963-05-11	Don Knotts, Ronny Howard & Andy Griffith of The Andy Griffith Show	Photograph	Richard R. Hewett
1963-05-18	E. G. Marshall & Robert Reed of The Defenders	Photograph	Philippe Halsman
1963-05-25	Lawrence Welk	Photograph	
1963-06-01	Dorothy Loudon & Garry Moore	Photograph	
1963-06-08	Johnny Carson of The Tonight Show	Photograph	Curt Gunther
1963-06-15	Vic Morrow & Rick Jason of Combat!	Photograph	
1963-06-22	Durward Kirby, Allen Funt & Marilyn Van Derbur of Candid Camera	Photograph	Philippe Halsman
1963-06-29	Donna Reed & Carl Betz	Photograph	
1963-07-06	Glenn Corbett & Martin Milner of Route 66	Photograph	
1963-07-13	The Lively Ones	Photograph	Jay Thompson
1963-07-20	Dennis Weaver & James Arness of Gunsmoke	Photograph	
1963-07-27	Selecting Game Show Contestants	Illustration	Constantin Alajalov
1963-08-03	Morey Amsterdam & Richard Deacon of The Dick Van Dyke Show	Photograph	
1963-08-10	Cast of I've Got a Secret	Photograph	Carroll Seghers II
1963-08-17	Fred MacMurray of My Three Sons	Photograph	Sid Avery
1963-08-24	June Lockhart, Lassie & Jon Provost	Photograph	
1963-08-31	Richard Boone	Illustration	Bradford Boobis
1963-09-07	Irene Ryan & Donna Douglas of The Beverly Hillbillies	Photograph	Gene Trindl
1963-09-14	Fall Preview		
1963-09-21	Richard Chamberlain	Photograph	
1963-09-28	Inger Stevens of The Farmer's Daughter	Photograph	Ed Clark
1963-10-05	Phil Silvers	Photograph	Gene Trindl
1963-10-12	Ben Gazzara & Chuck Connors of Arrest and Trial	Photograph	Gene Trindl
1963-10-19	Judy Garland	Illustration	René Bouché
1963-10-26	Roberta Shore & Lee J. Cobb	Photograph	Leo Fuchs
1963-11-02	Bill Bixby & Ray Walston of My Favorite Martian	Photograph	Philippe Halsman
1963-11-09	Carol Burnett (Calamity Jane)	Photograph	
1963-11-16	James Franciscus & Dean Jagger of Mr. Novak	Photograph	
1963-11-23	Cast of Burke's Law	Photograph	
1963-11-30	George C. Scott of East Side/West Side	Photograph	Jerry Dantzig
1963-12-07	John McIntire & Robert Fuller of Wagon Train	Photograph	
1963-12-14	Rosemary Clooney, Frank Sinatra, Dean Martin, Kathryn Crosby & Bing Crosby	Photograph	
1963-12-21	Christmas	Photograph	
1963-12-28	Patty Duke in a New Years-themed photo	Photograph	Phillipe Halsman

== 1964 ==
Issue date	Cover subject	Type of cover	Artist
1964-01-04	Mary Tyler Moore, Dick Van Dyke & Carl Reiner of The Dick Van Dyke Show	Photograph	
1964-01-11	"Hollywood's Favorite Second Tomatoes" featuring Marjorie Lord, June Lockhart, Amanda Blake & Barbara Hale	Photograph	
1964-01-18	Pernell Roberts & Kathie Browne of Bonanza	Photograph	
1964-01-25	"America's Long Vigil", a chronology of how TV covered the John F. Kennedy assassination & its aftermath	Illustration	Arthur Williams
1964-02-01	Danny Kaye & Laurie Ichinio of The Danny Kaye Show	Photograph	
1964-02-08	Linda Kaye Henning, Pat Woodell, Jeannine Riley & Bea Benaderet of Petticoat Junction	Photograph	
1964-02-15	Andy Williams & Claudine Longet	Photograph	Sheedy-Long (Jack Sheedy & George Long)
1964-02-22	David Janssen of The Fugitive	Photograph	
1964-02-29	Shirl Conway & Zina Bethune of The Nurses	Photograph	Jerry Dantzig
1964-03-07	Richard Chamberlain of Dr. Kildare	Photograph	
1964-03-14	Irene Ryan, Donna Douglas & Buddy Ebsen of The Beverly Hillbillies	Photograph	
1964-03-21	Don Knotts, Andy Griffith & Jim Nabors of The Andy Griffith Show	Photograph	Richard R. Hewett
1964-03-28	Lawrence Welk	Photograph	
1964-04-04	Vince Edwards of Ben Casey	Illustration	Al Parker
1964-04-11	Bill Bixby & Ray Walston of My Favorite Martian	Photograph	
1964-04-18	Dean Jagger & James Franciscus of Mr. Novak	Photograph	
1964-04-25	Danny Thomas	Illustration	Robert Engle
1964-05-02	William Windom & Inger Stevens of The Farmer's Daughter	Photograph	
1964-05-09	Vic Morrow & Rick Jason of Combat!	Photograph	
1964-05-16	Alfred Hitchcock	Photograph	Gene Trindl
1964-05-23	Mary Tyler Moore of The Dick Van Dyke Show	Illustration	Jon Whitcomb
1964-05-30	Ernest Borgnine, Tim Conway & Joe Flynn of McHale's Navy	Photograph	
1964-06-06	Amanda Blake of Gunsmoke	Photograph	Mario Casilli
1964-06-13	Fred Flintstone of The Flintstones chiseling away at the TV Guide logo	Illustration	Hanna-Barbera Studios
1964-06-20	Donna Reed	Photograph	Ivan Nagy
1964-06-27	Johnny Carson & Joanne Copeland	Photograph	
1964-07-04	Raymond Burr of Perry Mason with the character's creator Erle Stanley Gardner	Photograph	
1964-07-11	"The Anchor Men"	Photograph	
1964-07-18	Doug McClure, Roberta Shore & James Drury of The Virginian	Photograph	
1964-07-25	Fred MacMurray of My Three Sons	Photograph	
1964-08-01	Hugh Downs, Maureen O'Sullivan, Frank Blair & Jack Lescoulie of Today	Photograph	
1964-08-08	Gene Barry & Gary Conway of Burke's Law	Photograph	
1964-08-15	Wagon Train	Photograph	
1964-08-22	E. G. Marshall of The Defenders	Photograph	
1964-08-29	Patty Duke, William Schallert & Jean Byron of The Patty Duke Show	Photograph	
1964-09-05	Lucille Ball of The Lucy Show	Illustration	Al Parker
1964-09-12	David Janssen & Barry Morse of The Fugitive	Photograph	
1964-09-19	Fall Preview	Illustration	
1964-09-26	Dan Blocker of Bonanza	Photograph	Carl Frith
1964-10-03	Mia Farrow of Peyton Place	Photograph	Dennis Cameron
1964-10-10	David Niven, Charles Boyer & Gig Young of The Rogues	Photograph	
1964-10-17	Lassie & Robert Bray of Lassie	Photograph	
1964-10-24	Robert Vaughn of The Man from U.N.C.L.E.	Photograph	
1964-10-31	John Astin & Carolyn Jones of The Addams Family	Photograph	Ivan Nagy
1964-11-07	Richard Chamberlain & Daniela Bianchi of Dr. Kildare	Photograph	
1964-11-14	Cara Williams of The Cara Williams Show	Illustration	Jon Whitcomb
1964-11-21	Jim Nabors of Gomer Pyle, U.S.M.C.	Photograph	Gene Trindl
1964-11-28	Elizabeth Montgomery of Bewitched	Photograph	Ron Thal
1964-12-05	Sammy Jackson & Laurie Sibbald of No Time for Sergeants	Photograph	
1964-12-12	Julie Newmar of My Living Doll	Photograph	
1964-12-19	Christmas	Illustration	William Steig
1964-12-26	Juliet Prowse	Photograph	

== 1965 ==
Issue date	Cover subject	Type of cover	Artist
1965-01-02	Al Lewis, Yvonne De Carlo & Fred Gwynne of The Munsters	Photograph	
1965-01-09	Broadside	Photograph	
1965-01-16	Bob Hope	Illustration	Ronald Searle
1965-01-23	Chuck Connors of Branded	Photograph	
1965-01-30	Inger Stevens of The Farmer's Daughter	Photograph	
1965-02-06	Jackie Gleason	Photograph	Allan Gould
1965-02-13	Andy Williams	Photograph	Bob Vose
1965-02-20	Burgess Meredith & James Franciscus of Mr. Novak	Photograph	Laurence Schiller
1965-02-27	Donna Douglas, Irene Ryan & Nancy Kulp of The Beverly Hillbillies	Photograph	
1965-03-06	David Janssen of The Fugitive	Photograph	
1965-03-13	Michael Landon, Lorne Greene, Dan Blocker & Pernell Roberts of Bonanza	Photograph	
1965-03-20	Dorothy Malone of Peyton Place with daughters	Photograph	
1965-03-27	Mary Tyler Moore & Dick Van Dyke of The Dick Van Dyke Show	Photograph	
1965-04-03	Vince Edwards & Kathy Kersh of Ben Casey	Photograph	
1965-04-10	Janet Blake & Walter Brennan of The Tycoon	Photograph	Richard R.Hewett
1965-04-17	Robert Vaughn & David McCallum of The Man From U.N.C.L.E.	Photograph	
1965-04-24	Andy Griffith	Photograph	
1965-05-01	Connie Stevens of Wendy and Me	Photograph	
1965-05-08	Bob Denver & Tina Louise of Gilligan's Island	Photograph	Ivan Nagy
1965-05-15	Robert Lansing of Twelve O'Clock High	Photograph	
1965-05-22	Julie Andrews	Photograph	
1965-05-29	Elizabeth Montgomery & Dick York of Bewitched	Photograph	Ivan Nagy
1965-06-05	Flipper & Brian Kelly	Photograph	
1965-06-12	Milburn Stone & Amanda Blake of Gunsmoke	Photograph	
1965-06-19	Richard Basehart & David Hedison of Voyage to the Bottom of the Sea	Photograph	Ivan Nagy
1965-06-26	Hullabaloo	Photograph	Douglas Kirkland
1965-07-03	Jimmy Dean	Photograph	
1965-07-10	Yvonne De Carlo & Fred Gwynne of The Munsters	Photograph	Gene Trindl
1965-07-17	The cast of McHale's Navy recreating Washington Crossing the Delaware	Photograph	Gene Trindl
1965-07-24	Raymond Burr of Perry Mason	Illustration	Al Parker
1965-07-31	Stanley Livingston, Fred MacMurray & Barry Livingston of My Three Sons	Photograph	
1965-08-07	Gene Barry of Burke's Law	Photograph	
1965-08-14	Robert Bray & Lassie	Photograph	John R. Hamilton
1965-08-21	Fess Parker & Patricia Blair of Daniel Boone	Photograph	
1965-08-28	Lucille Ball with Splash	Photograph	Sheedy-Long (Jack Sheedy & George Long)
1965-09-04	Dan Blocker, Lorne Greene & Michael Landon of Bonanza	Illustration	Ronald Searle
1965-09-11	Fall Preview		
1965-09-18	"1966 TV Set Buyers Guide"	Photograph	
1965-09-25	Jackie Gleason	Photograph	Vytas Valaitis
1965-10-02	Don Adams & Barbara Feldon of Get Smart	Photograph	
1965-10-09	Anne Francis of Honey West	Photograph	
1965-10-16	Red Skelton	Illustration	Ronald Searle
1965-10-23	Chuck Connors of Branded	Photograph	
1965-10-30	John Astin & Carolyn Jones of The Addams Family	Photograph Illustration	Ivan Nagy (Photograph) Charles Addams (Illustration)
1965-11-06	June Lockhart & Guy Williams of Lost in Space	Photograph	Gene Trindl
1965-11-13	Joey Heatherton	Photograph	
1965-11-20	Efrem Zimbalist Jr. of The F.B.I.	Photograph	Philippe Halsman
1965-11-27	Cynthia Lynn & Bob Crane of Hogan's Heroes	Photograph	Gene Trindl
1965-12-04	Juliet Prowse	Photograph	
1965-12-11	Forrest Tucker, Melody Patterson, Ken Berry & Larry Storch of F Troop	Photograph	Sheedy-Long (Jack Sheedy & George Long)
1965-12-18	Jim Nabors of Gomer Pyle, U.S.M.C.	Photograph	Jay Thompson
1965-12-25	Christmas	Photograph	Design: William Woods Photo: John Bodziak

== 1966 ==
Issue date	Cover subject	Type of cover	Artist
1966-01-01	Carol Channing	Photograph	Bill Claxton
1966-01-08	Eva Gabor & Eddie Albert of Green Acres	Photograph	
1966-01-15	Robert Culp & Bill Cosby of I Spy	Photograph	Ken Whitmore
1966-01-22	David Janssen of The Fugitive	Illustration	Ronald Searle
1966-01-29	The Cast of Please Don't Eat the Daisies	Photograph	Ron Thal
1966-02-05	Barbara Eden & Larry Hagman of I Dream of Jeannie	Photograph	Gene Trindl
1966-02-12	Ryan O'Neal & Barbara Parkins of Peyton Place	Photograph	Gene Trindl
1966-02-19	Ben Gazzara of Run for Your Life	Photograph	Ivan Nagy
1966-02-26	Charles Briles, Linda Evans & Barbara Stanwyck of The Big Valley	Photograph	
1966-03-05	Barbara Feldon of Get Smart	Photo illustration	Andy Warhol
1966-03-12	Donna Douglas, Irene Ryan, Buddy Ebsen & Max Baer Jr. of The Beverly Hillbillies	Illustration	Ronald Searle
1966-03-19	David McCallum & Robert Vaughn of The Man from U.N.C.L.E.	Photograph	Philippe Halsman
1966-03-26	Adam West of Batman	Photograph	Sheedy-Long (Jack Sheedy & George Long)
1966-04-02	Dean Martin	Photograph	Phillipe Halsman
1966-04-09	Roy Thinnes of The Long, Hot Summer	Photograph	Ron Thal
1966-04-16	Lori Saunders, Linda Kaye Henning & Gunilla Hutton of Petticoat Junction	Photograph	Ivan Nagy
1966-04-23	Andy Williams	Photograph	Ivan Nagy
1966-04-30	Lucille Ball of The Lucy Show	Illustration	Ronald Searle
1966-05-07	President Lyndon B. Johnson with Ray Scherer of NBC News	Photograph	
1966-05-14	Frank Sinatra	Illustration	Bernie Fuchs
1966-05-21	Robert Conrad & Ross Martin of The Wild Wild West	Photograph	
1966-05-28	Sally Field of Gidget	Photograph	Sheedy-Long (Jack Sheedy & George Long)
1966-06-04	Andy Griffith	Photograph	Ken Whitmore
1966-06-11	Alan Hale Jr., Tina Louise & Bob Denver of Gilligan's Island	Photograph	
1966-06-18	Elizabeth Montgomery & Agnes Moorehead of Bewitched	Illustration	Ronald Searle
1966-06-25	William Smith, Peter Brown, Philip Carey & Neville Brand of Laredo	Photograph	
1966-07-02	Walter Cronkite	Photograph	Phillipe Halsman
1966-07-09	Brian Kelly & Flipper	Photograph	
1966-07-16	Fred MacMurray & William Demarest of My Three Sons	Photograph	
1966-07-23	Efrem Zimbalist Jr. & Stephen Brooks of The F.B.I.	Photograph	
1966-07-30	Johnny Carson	Photograph	Philippe Halsman
1966-08-06	Marshall Thompson & Clarence the lion of Daktari	Photograph	Richard R. Hewett
1966-08-13	Melody Patterson & Larry Storch of F Troop	Photograph	
1966-08-20	Red Skelton	Photograph	
1966-08-27	Barbara Feldon, Don Adams & K-13 the dog of Get Smart	Photograph	Ken Whitmore
1966-09-03	Eva Gabor of Green Acres	Photograph	
1966-09-10	Fall Preview	Illustration	
1966-09-17	"1967 TV Set Buyers Guide" featuring Joey Heatherton	Photograph	
1966-09-24	Barbara Eden of I Dream of Jeannie	Photograph	
1966-10-01	"The Vietnam War: Is TV Giving US the Picture?"	Photograph	Neil Hickey
1966-10-08	Jim Nabors of Gomer Pyle, U.S.M.C.	Photograph	Leigh Weiner
1966-10-15	Peter Deuel & Judy Carne of Love on a Rooftop	Photograph	
1966-10-22	Lucille Ball	Photograph	
1966-10-29	Van Williams & Bruce Lee of The Green Hornet	Photograph	Ivan Nagy
1966-11-05	Robert Vaughn & David McCallum of The Man from U.N.C.L.E.	Illustration	Ronald Searle
1966-11-12	Marlo Thomas of That Girl	Photograph	Ken Whitmore
1966-11-19	Bob Crane & Robert Clary of Hogan's Heroes	Photograph	
1966-11-26	Ron Ely of Tarzan	Photograph	Curt Gunther
1966-12-03	Larry Casey, Christopher George & Justin Tarr of The Rat Patrol	Photograph	
1966-12-10	James Arness of Gunsmoke	Illustration	Bernard Fuchs
1966-12-17	Michael Callan & Patricia Harty of Occasional Wife	Photograph	
1966-12-24	Merry Christmas	Illustration	
1966-12-31	Stefanie Powers of The Girl from U.N.C.L.E.	Photograph	

== 1967 ==
Issue date	Cover subject	Type of cover	Artist
1967-01-07	Ben Gazzara of Run for Your Life	Photograph	Gene Trindl
1967-01-14	Art Carney	Photograph	Allan Gould
1967-01-21	Diana Rigg & Patrick Macnee	Photograph	Terry O'Neill
1967-01-28	Micky Dolenz, Michael Nesmith, Peter Tork & Davy Jones of The Monkees	Photograph	Gene Trindl
1967-02-04	Dale Robertson of Iron Horse	Photograph	Ivan Nagy
1967-02-11	Steven Hill, Barbara Bain & Martin Landau of Mission: Impossible	Photograph	
1967-02-18	"A Day with Dean Martin"	Photograph	Martin Mills
1967-02-25	Phyllis Diller		
1967-03-04	William Shatner & Leonard Nimoy of Star Trek	Photograph	Sheedy-Long
1967-03-11	Dorothy Malone of Peyton Place	Photograph	Christa Zinner
1967-03-18	Jackie Gleason	Illustration	Bernie Fuchs
1967-03-25	Robert Culp & Bill Cosby of I Spy	Photograph	
1967-04-01	Cheryl Miller & Judy the chimp of Daktari	Photograph	Russ Halford
1967-04-08	Dick Van Dyke	Photograph	
1967-04-15	Karen Jensen, the subject of a report on Hollywood starlets	Photograph	Richard R. Hewett
1967-04-22	Anissa Jones, Sebastian Cabot & Brian Keith of Family Affair	Photograph	
1967-04-29	Lawrence Welk		
1967-05-06	Harry Morgan & Jack Webb of Dragnet		
1967-05-13	Elizabeth Montgomery of Bewitched	Photograph	Ivan Nagy
1967-05-20	Andy Griffith & Aneta Corsaut of The Andy Griffith Show	Photograph	
1967-05-27	Ken Berry, Forrest Tucker & Larry Storch of F Troop	Illustration	Ronald Searle
1967-06-03	Dennis Cole & Howard Duff of The Felony Squad		
1967-06-10	The Smothers Brothers	Photograph	Ken Whitmore
1967-06-17	Ed Sullivan	Photograph	Philippe Halsman
1967-06-24	Barbara Feldon & Don Adams of Get Smart	Photograph	
1967-07-01	Chet Huntley & David Brinkley of The Huntley–Brinkley Report	Illustration	Bernie Fuchs
1967-07-08	Efrem Zimbalist Jr. of The F.B.I. with F.B.I. director J. Edgar Hoover	Photograph	
1967-07-15	Lucille Ball of The Lucy Show	Illustration	Bob Peak
1967-07-22	Michael Landon, Dan Blocker & Lorne Greene of Bonanza	Photograph	Ivan Nagy
1967-07-29	Justin Tarr, Gary Raymond, Christopher George & Larry Casey of The Rat Patrol	Photograph	
1967-08-05	Hugh Downs & Barbara Walters of Today	Photograph	Sheldon Secunda
1967-08-12	Mike Douglas of The Mike Douglas Show	Photograph	Paul Wilson
1967-08-19	Barry Morse & David Janssen of The Fugitive	Photograph	
1967-08-26	Jim Nabors of Gomer Pyle, U.S.M.C.	Illustration	Ronald Searle
1967-09-02	Eddie Albert & Eva Gabor of Green Acres	Photograph	Mario Casilli
1967-09-09	Fall Preview: 1967/1968 Shows		
1967-09-16	Raymond Burr of Ironside		
1967-09-23	Peter Tork, Micky Dolenz, Michael Nesmith & Davy Jones of The Monkees	Photograph	Gene Trindl
1967-09-30	Sally Field of The Flying Nun	Photograph	Mario Casilli
1967-10-07	Richard Benjamin, Jack Cassidy & Paula Prentiss of He & She		
1967-10-14	Johnny Carson	Photograph	Roger Prigent
1967-10-21	Mia Farrow	Photograph	Ivan Nagy
1967-10-28	"Who Killed Hollywood Society?"	Illustration	Arthur Williams
1967-11-04	Stuart Whitman of Cimarron Strip		
1967-11-11	Yvette Mimieux	Photograph	Roger Prigent
1967-11-18	William Shatner & Leonard Nimoy	Illustration	Bob Peak
1967-11-25	Garrison's Gorillas		
1967-12-02	Danny & Marlo Thomas		
1967-12-09	Kaye Ballard & Eve Arden of The Mothers-in-Law	Photograph	Mario Casilli
1967-12-16	Sebastian Cabot of Family Affair		
1967-12-23	Merry Christmas		
1967-12-30	Carol Burnett	Photograph	Mario Casilli

== 1968 ==
Issue date	Cover subject	Type of cover	Artist
1968-01-06	Robert Conrad of The Wild Wild West	Photograph	
1968-01-13	Bob Hope	Illustration	Bernie Fuchs
1968-01-20	The High Chaparral	Photograph	
1968-01-27	Elizabeth Montgomery of Bewitched	Photograph	
1968-02-03	Ben Gazzara of Run for Your Life	Photograph	Roger Prigent
1968-02-10	Tom Smothers & Dick Smothers	Illustration	Bob Peak
1968-02-17	Efrem Zimbalist Jr. & William Reynolds of The F.B.I.	Photograph	
1968-02-24	Joey Bishop of The Joey Bishop Show	Photograph	Martin Mills
1968-03-02	David Canary & Lorne Greene of Bonanza	Photograph	Gene Trindl
1968-03-09	Jackie Gleason	Photograph	
1968-03-16	Sally Field & Alejandro Rey of The Flying Nun	Photograph	
1968-03-23	Robert Culp & Bill Cosby of I Spy	Illustration	Bernie Fuchs
1968-03-30	Lucille Ball	Photograph	
1968-04-06	Barbara Anderson & Raymond Burr of Ironside	Photograph	
1968-04-13	Carl Betz of Judd, for the Defense	Photograph	
1968-04-20	Barbara Feldon of Get Smart	Photograph	
1968-04-27	Leslie Uggams	Photograph	
1968-05-04	Greg Morris, Peter Graves, Barbara Bain & Martin Landau of Mission: Impossible	Photograph	Phillipe Halsman
1968-05-11	Fess Parker, Darby Hinton & Patricia Blair of Daniel Boone	Photograph	
1968-05-18	Mike Connors of Mannix	Photograph	
1968-05-25	Diana Hyland of Peyton Place	Photograph	
1968-06-01	Ed Sullivan	Illustration	Ronald Searle
1968-06-08	"Salvador Dalí's view of television", an illustration incorporating photos of Hugh Downs & Johnny Carson	Photo illustration	Painting by Salvador Dalí Photographed by Philippe Halsman
1968-06-15	Linda Cristal & Leif Erickson of The High Chaparral	Photograph	
1968-06-22	Toni Helfer	Photograph	
1968-06-29	Robert Wagner of It Takes a Thief	Photograph	
1968-07-06	Barbara Eden of I Dream of Jeannie	Photograph	
1968-07-13	Jim Nabors, Andy Griffith & Don Knotts	Illustration	Jack Davis
1968-07-20	Barbara Stanwyck, Richard Long & Linda Evans of The Big Valley	Photograph	
1968-07-27	Joey Heatherton & Frank Sinatra Jr.	Photograph	Martin Mills
1968-08-03	Walter Cronkite, David Brinkley, Howard K. Smith & Chet Huntley	Photograph	
1968-08-10	Cast of Gentle Ben	Photograph	
1968-08-17	Milburn Stone, James Arness & Amanda Blake of Gunsmoke	Illustration	
1968-08-24	DeForest Kelley, William Shatner & Leonard Nimoy of Star Trek	Photograph	Gene Trindl
1968-08-31	Johnny Carson	Illustration	Ronald Searle
1968-09-07	Anissa Jones, Johnnie Whitaker, Kathy Garver & Sebastian Cabot of Family Affair	Photograph	Gene Trindl
1968-09-14	Fall Preview		
1968-09-21	Dan Rowan & Dick Martin of Rowan and Martin's Laugh-In	Photograph	
1968-09-28	Dean Martin	Photograph	
1968-10-05	Fred MacMurray, Tina Cole & Don Grady of My Three Sons	Photograph	
1968-10-12	1968 Summer Olympics preview	Illustration	
1968-10-19	Jim Nabors	Photograph	
1968-10-26	Hope Lange of The Ghost & Mrs. Muir	Photograph	Ivan Nagy
1968-11-02	Peggy Lipton, Clarence Williams III & Michael Cole of The Mod Squad	Photograph	
1968-11-09	Barbara Feldon of Get Smart	Photograph	
1968-11-16	Bob Denver & Herb Edelman of The Good Guys	Photograph	
1968-11-23	Frank Sinatra	Photograph	
1968-11-30	Ann-Margret	Photograph	
1968-12-07	E. J. Peaker & Robert Morse of That's Life	Photograph	
1968-12-14	Diahann Carroll of Julia	Photograph	Roger Prigent
1968-12-21	Christmas	Illustration	
1968-12-28	Doris Day of The Doris Day Show	Illustration	Al Parker

== 1969 ==
Issue date	Cover subject	Type of cover	Artist
1969-01-04	David Soul, Bridget Hanley, Bobby Sherman & Robert Brown of Here Come the Brides	Photograph	
1969-01-11	Bob Hope	Illustration	Gerald Scarfe
1969-01-18	Darren McGavin of The Outsider	Photograph	
1969-01-25	Deanna Lund & Gary Conway of Land of the Giants	Photograph	
1969-02-01	Cameron Mitchell, Henry Darrow, Mark Slade & Leif Erickson of The High Chaparral	Photograph	
1969-02-08	Peter Lupus, Greg Morris, Peter Graves, Barbara Bain & Martin Landau of Mission: Impossible	Illustration	Jack Davis
1969-02-15	Raymond Burr of Ironside	Photograph	
1969-02-22	James Stacey, Wayne Maunder & Andrew Duggan of Lancer	Photograph	
1969-03-01	Lucille Ball, Desi Arnaz Jr. & Lucie Arnaz of Here's Lucy	Photograph	
1969-03-08	Ruth Buzzi, Jo Anne Worley, Goldie Hawn, Artie Johnson, Chelsea Brown, Judy Carne & Henry Gibson of Rowan and Martin's Laugh-In	Photo Montage	
1969-03-15	Buddy Foster & Ken Berry of Mayberry R.F.D.	Photograph	
1969-03-22	Elizabeth Montgomery of Bewitched	Photograph	
1969-03-29	Tony Franciosa, Gene Barry & Robert Stack of The Name of the Game	Photograph	
1969-04-05	Tom & Dick Smothers of The Smothers Brothers Comedy Hour	Photograph	
1969-04-12	Dick Van Dyke & Mary Tyler Moore	Photograph	
1969-04-19	Lawrence Welk	Illustration	Bob Peak
1969-04-26	Jack Paar	Photograph	Philippe Halsman
1969-05-03	Madeleine Sherwood & Sally Field of The Flying Nun	Photograph	
1969-05-10	"The Raging Controversy over TV's Role in Space Shots"	Illustration	Bob Peak
1969-05-17	Marlo Thomas of That Girl	Photograph	
1969-05-24	Hugh Downs, Barbara Walters, Joe Garagiola & Frank Blair of Today	Illustration	Jack Davis
1969-05-31	Anissa Jones, Sebastian Cabot & Johnnie Whitaker of Family Affair	Photograph	
1969-06-07	"The Hollywood Dancer" featuring Laugh-In dancer Debbie Macomber	Photograph	Richard R. Hewett
1969-06-14	Glen Campbell	Photograph	Jim Marshall
1969-06-21	Jackie Gleason	Illustration	Ronald Searle
1969-06-28	Marc Copage and Diahann Carroll of Julia	Photograph	
1969-07-05	Kent McCord & Martin Milner of Adam-12	Photograph	
1969-07-12	Peggy Lipton, Clarence Williams III & Michael Cole of The Mod Squad	Photograph	
1969-07-19	"The First Live Telecast from the Moon"	Illustration	Norman Adams
1969-07-26	June Lockhart, Edgar Buchanan, Lori Saunders, Meredith MacRae & Linda Kaye of Petticoat Junction	Illustration	Jack Davis
1969-08-02	Andrew Duggan of Lancer	Photograph	
1969-08-09	"Will Soaring Costs Knock Sports Off TV?"		
1969-08-16	Merv Griffin on the week of his talk show's late-night debut on CBS	Photograph	Philippe Halsman
1969-08-23	Linda Cristal & Leif Erickson of The High Chaparral	Photograph	
1969-08-30	Johnny Cash of The Johnny Cash Show	Photograph	Joe Baker
1969-09-06	Eddie Albert & Eva Gabor of Green Acres	Photograph	Gene Howard
1969-09-13	Fall Preview	Word art	
1969-09-20	Jim Nabors of The Jim Nabors Hour	Photograph	
1969-09-27	Robert Young & James Brolin of Marcus Welby, M.D.	Photograph	Gene Trindl
1969-10-04	Bill Cosby of The Bill Cosby Show	Illustration	Bob Peak
1969-10-11	"What's TV Doing to Them?": An examination of TV's effect on children	Photograph	
1969-10-18	Peter Lupus, Greg Morris, Leonard Nimoy & Peter Graves of Mission: Impossible	Photograph	
1969-10-25	Joan Hotchkis, William Windom & Lisa Gerritsen of My World and Welcome to It	Photo illustration	
1969-11-01	Denise Nicholas, Michael Constantine & Lloyd Haynes of Room 222	Photograph	
1969-11-08	Andy Williams of The Andy Williams Show	Illustration	Bernie Fuchs
1969-11-15	Dan Dailey & Julie Sommars of The Governor & J.J.	Photograph	
1969-11-22	Barbara Eden of I Dream of Jeannie	Photograph	
1969-11-29	Michael Landon, Lorne Greene, Dan Blocker & David Canary of Bonanza	Illustration	Raymond Ameijide
1969-12-06	Doris Day of The Doris Day Show	Photograph	
1969-12-13	Michael Parks of Then Came Bronson	Photograph	
1969-12-20	Christmas	Illustration	Gene Szafran
1969-12-27	"Remember 1969?" featuring Richard Nixon, Spiro Agnew, Dick & Tom Smothers, astronauts & the New York Mets	Photo illustration	

== Sources ==
- Covers and table of contents page descriptions for the various issues.
- TV Guide cover archive website: 1960s
- TV Guide: Fifty Years of Television, New York, NY: Crown Publishers, 2002. ISBN 1-4000-4685-8
- Stephen Hofer, ed., TV Guide: The Official Collectors Guide, Braintree, Mass.: BangZoom Publishers, 2006. ISBN 0-9772927-1-1.
- "50 Greatest TV Guide Covers," article from the June 15, 2002 edition of TV Guide
- Information from ellwanger.tv's TV Guide collection section
