= Meredith MacRae =

American actress and singer (1944–2000)

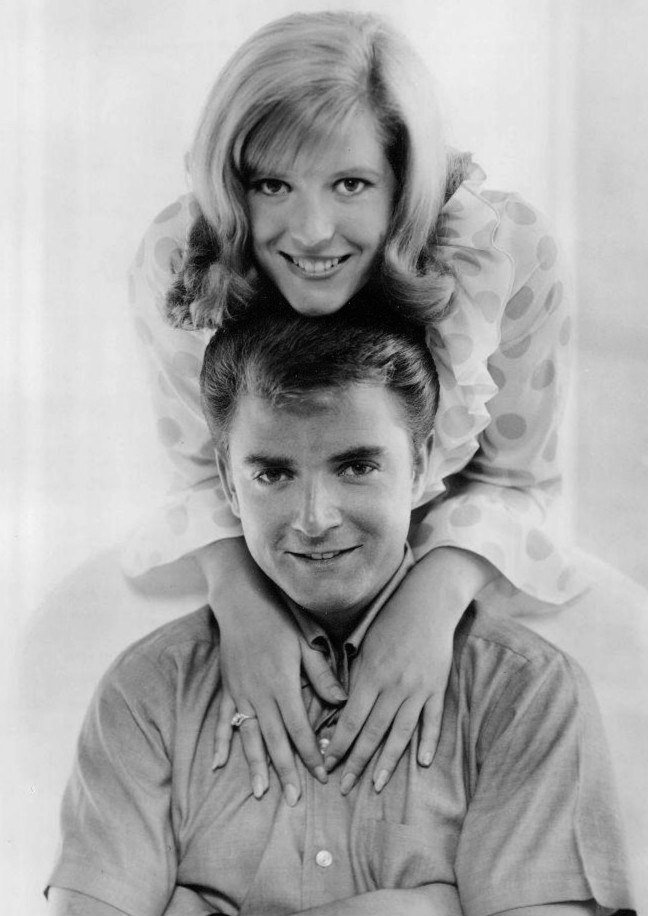
- MacRae and Tim Considine in My Three Sons, 1965.
- Born: May 30, 1944; Houston, Texas, U.S.
- Died: July 14, 2000 (aged 56); Manhattan Beach, California, U.S.
- Occupations: Actress; singer; talk show host
- Years active: 1953–1995
- Known for: My Three Sons; Petticoat Junction
- Spouses: Richard Berger (m. 1964; div. 1968); Greg Mullavey (m. 1969; div. 1987); Phillip M. Neal (m. 1995)
- Children: 1
- Parents: Gordon MacRae (father); Sheila MacRae (mother)
- Relatives: Heather MacRae (sister)

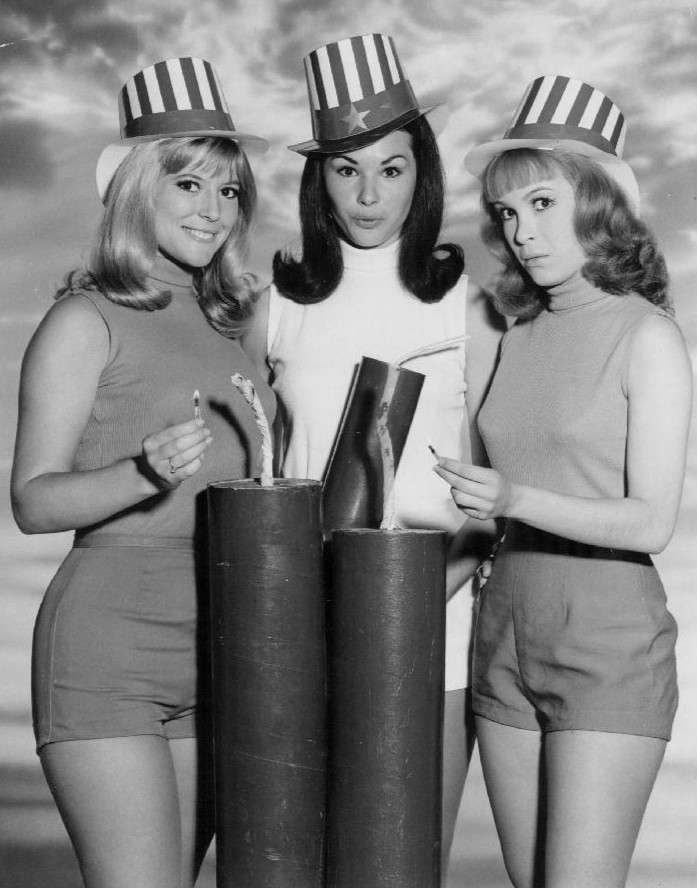
Meredith MacRae, Lori Saunders, and Linda Kaye Henning on Petticoat Junction (1967)

Meredith Lynn MacRae (May 30, 1944 – July 14, 2000) was an American actress, singer and talk show host. She is known for her roles as Sally Morrison on My Three Sons (1963–1965) and as Billie Jo Bradley on Petticoat Junction (1966–1970).

== Early life ==
MacRae was born in Houston, Texas, to parents Gordon and Sheila MacRae. Her father was stationed with the Army Air Corps in Houston at the time of her birth. Both of her parents went on to be actors. She was the sister of William Gordon "Gar" MacRae, Robert Bruce MacRae and Heather MacRae.

== Career ==
MacRae made her breakthrough appearance as Sally Anne Morrison Douglas on the ABC (later CBS) sitcom My Three Sons. She played Mike Douglas (Tim Considine)'s love interest for three seasons (1963–1965). She asked to be written out of the show to further explore her career.

In 1966 MacRae signed a contract with CBS to play Billie Jo Bradley on the sitcom Petticoat Junction, starring Bea Benaderet as her mother Kate Bradley and Edgar Buchanan as her great uncle Joe Carson. Her sisters were Betty Jo (played by Linda Kaye Henning) and Bobbie Jo (Lori Saunders).

MacRae was the third actress to portray Billie Jo. Jeannine Riley played the part in the show's first two years (1963–1965) and Gunilla Hutton in the third year (1965–1966). Both of these actresses played the role as a typical boy-crazy dumb blonde. However, by the time of MacRae's debut on the series, Billie Jo's persona was that of a strong, independent woman who focused on a singing career, a dream she later accomplishes.

At first, the producers' intent was for Billie Jo and Steve Elliott (portrayed by Mike Minor) to have a relationship and eventually marry. However, Minor and Henning were dating at the time and eventually got married. The producers decided to incorporate their marriage into the show. McRae would later state in a 1969 interview that this cost her screen time and from that moment on she was anxious for the show to end. She remained with the sitcom until its cancellation in 1970.

MacRae took over the role of Animal from Valora Noland in Bikini Beach (1964), the third beach party film produced by American International Pictures. She had an uncredited appearance on the bus in the film Ski Party (1965). She was a guest on NBC's The Spring Thing, a musical television special hosted by Bobbie Gentry and Noel Harrison. Other guests included Goldie Hawn, Irwin C. Watson, Rod McKuen, Shirley Bassey and Harpers Bizarre. Her other film appearances included Norwood (1970), My Friends Need Killing (1976), Grand Jury (1976), Sketches of a Strangler (1978), Earthbound (1981) and The Census Taker (1984). MacRae made guest appearances on such shows as The Donald O'Connor Show (1968 version); The Dean Martin Show (1971); The F.B.I.; The Mike Douglas Show; The Rockford Files; Fantasy Island; Webster; CHiPs; The Fall Guy; Love, American Style; and Magnum, P.I..

MacRae was also a popular game show guest, appearing on Funny You Should Ask; Match Game ('60s, '70s, and '90s versions); What's My Line?; I've Got a Secret; Personality; Snap Judgment; He Said, She Said (with then-husband Greg Mullavey); Tattletales (also with Mullavey); Hollywood Squares; The Dating Game; To Tell the Truth; Password (ABC version); $10,000 Pyramid and $25,000 Pyramid; Break the Bank; Celebrity Whew!; Beat the Clock; Card Sharks; The Cross-Wits; and Family Feud. She even hosted an unsold game show pilot called $50,000 a Minute alongside Geoff Edwards in 1985.

In the 1980s, MacRae hosted the talk show Mid-Morning Los Angeles, which ran for eight years. She received a local Emmy Award in 1986 for the show. Later, she created and hosted Born Famous, a PBS series on which she interviewed the offspring of celebrities. She also co-hosted VTV: Value Television with Alex Trebek. In 1994, MacRae narrated the audiobook version of columnist Deborah Laake’s book Secret Ceremonies: A Mormon Woman's Intimate Diary of Marriage and Beyond.

In summer stock in her teens, MacRae appeared with Dan Dailey in Take Me Along, with Andy Williams in Bye Bye Birdie, and in Annie Get Your Gun.

MacRae also helped raise funds for the Children's Burn Foundation, the American Cancer Society, and United Cerebral Palsy. She also lectured nationally on alcoholism and produced a TV special on the subject.

== Personal life ==
MacRae married Richard Berger, former president of MGM, in 1964, but they divorced four years later. In 1969, she married fellow actor Greg Mullavey, famous for Mary Hartman, Mary Hartman, and had one child with him before divorcing in 1987. Her final marriage was in 1995 to Phillip M. Neal, chairman and CEO of Avery-Dennison.

=== Death ===
In January 1999, MacRae began to experience vertigo and short-term memory loss. She was evaluated and her symptoms were initially thought to be due to perimenopause. She returned to her doctor complaining of severe headaches. She was told the headaches were most likely due to muscle spasms and was encouraged to do cervical spine stretching. She obtained a second opinion and was diagnosed with brain cancer, which had already progressed to stage four. Emergency surgery was performed to remove the tumor and decrease the pressure in MacRae's head. During the operation, she suffered cardiac arrest but was resuscitated. Though her cancer was terminal, MacRae agreed to be part of an experimental cancer drug program. However, she experienced an allergic reaction to the medication that caused swelling in her brain that required two more surgeries to relieve the pressure. Her vertigo later resulted in a fall that fractured her hip.

MacRae died on July 14, 2000 at her Manhattan Beach home at age 56 from complications of brain cancer. In accordance with her wishes, her body was cremated, and her ashes were scattered in the Pacific Ocean off the coast of California.

== Filmography ==
=== Film ===
Year	Title	Role	Notes
1963	Beach Party	Beach Girl	
1964	Bikini Beach	Animal	
1966	Footsteps in the Snow	Henrietta	
1970	Norwood	Kay	
1976	My Friends Need Killing	Laura Kline	
1976	Grand Jury	Nancy Williams	
1978	The Chinese Caper	Carolyn Moore Fong	
1978	Sketches of a Strangler	Lynn Forrester / Margaret Forrester	
1981	Earthbound	Lara	
1983	I'm Going to Be Famous	Susan Barker	
1984	The Census Taker	Martha	
1984	Vultures	Dr. Baker	
1995	The Killers Within	Talk Show Hostess	

=== Television ===
Year	Title	Role	Notes
1954	The Colgate Comedy Hour	Herself	Episode: "Gale Storm, Jack Carter, Gene Sheldon, Debra Paget"
1963–1965	My Three Sons	Sally Ann Morrison Douglas	Main role; 29 episodes
1965	The Young Marrieds	Julie Kovacs	4 episodes
1966–1970	Petticoat Junction	Billie Jo Bradley	Main role; 114 episodes
1968	Insight	Gloria	Episode: "Three Cornered Flag"
1968	The Beverly Hillbillies	Billie Jo Bradley	3 episodes
1969	The Spring Thing	Herself	Television special
1970–1971	Love, American Style	Ruth / Linda	2 episodes
1971	The Dean Martin Show	Herself	Episode: "6.19"
1971	The Interns	Vicki	Episode: "Heart Trouble"
1971	Alias Smith and Jones	Sarah Henderson	Episode: "Something to Get Hung About"
1972	Banyon	Myra Shaw	Episode: "A Date with Death"
1973	The F.B.I.	Ruth Benson	Episode: "The Detonator"
1975	ABC's Wide World of Entertainment	Kendy	Episode: "The Werewolf of Woodstock"
1977	The Rockford Files	Lori Thompson	Episode: "Requiem for a Funny Box"
1978	The Next Step Beyond	Sara Westerly	Episode: "Ondine's Curse"
1978	Three on a Date	Valerie Owens	Television film
1978–1980	Fantasy Island	Cindy Barker / Dina DeWinter	2 episodes
1979	Comedy Is Not Pretty!	Herself	Television special
1980	CHiPs	Beth	Episode: "Off Road"
1983	The Fall Guy	Herself	Episode: "To the Finish"
1984	Calendar Girl Murders	Herself	Television film
1985	Rituals	Estelle Cunningham	TV series
1985	Webster	Amanda Parson	Episode: "The Uh-Oh Feeling"
1986	Magnum, P.I.	Charlotte Graham	Episode: "Summer School"
1987	It's Howdy Doody Time	Herself	Television special
1992	Batman: The Animated Series	Francine Langstrom (voice)	2 episodes
1993	Jonny's Golden Quest	Rachel Quest (voice)	Television film

== Discography ==
Solo

- "Image of a Boy"/"Time Stands Still" — Canjo 103 (1964)
- "Who Needs Memories of Him"/"Goodbye Love" — Capitol 2000 (1967)

The Girls from Petticoat Junction (Meredith MacRae, Linda Kaye Henning and Lori Saunders)

- "I'm So Glad That You Found Me"/"If You Could Only Be Me" — Imperial 66329 (1968)
- "Wheeling, West Virginia"/"Thirty Days Hath September" — Imperial 66346 (1968)
