= The Census Taker =

- theatrical poster
- Written by: Bruce R. Cook; William Kerwin; W. Gordon Smith
- Directed by: Bruce R. Cook
- Starring: Greg Mullavey; Meredith MacRae; Garrett Morris; Timothy Bottoms
- Music by: Jay Seagrave; The Residents
- Country of origin: United States
- Original language: English

Production
- Producer: Robert Bealmer
- Cinematography: Tom Jewett
- Editor: Bruce R. Cook
- Running time: 95 minutes
- Production company: Argentum Productions

Original release
- Release: July 1984

The Census Taker is a 1984 black comedy directed by Bruce R. Cook. It stars Greg Mullavey, Meredith MacRae, Timothy Bottoms, and Garrett Morris. The film was The Residents' first film soundtrack commission when their participation was suggested by Penn Jillette to Cook. It was released by Trans World Entertainment on VHS in 1989 under the title Husbands, Wives, Money & Murder.

== Plot ==
When George (Greg Mullavey) and Martha (Meredith MacRae) let Harvey (Garrett Morris), an annoying census taker, into their home, they find themselves under a barrage of increasingly abusive questions. Furious at his intrusiveness, and at their wit's end, they kill the census taker and with the help of their friends Pete (Timothy Bottoms) and Eva (Austen Tayler), must hide the body from a determined investigator.

== Cast ==
- Greg Mullavey as George
- Meredith MacRae as Martha
- Garrett Morris as Harvey
- Timothy Bottoms as Pete
- Austen Tayler as Eva
- Jennifer Finch as Punk Girl
- Troy Alexander as Edward
- Erin-Bruce Tolcharian as Robert
- William R. Bremer as Sheriff
