= Garrett Morris =

American actor (born 1937)

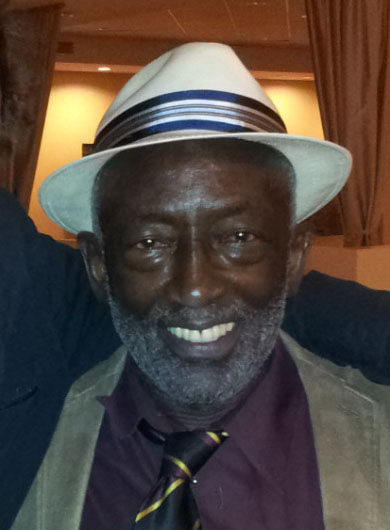
- Morris in 2013
- Born: Garrett Isaac Morris; February 1, 1937 (age 89); New Orleans, Louisiana, U.S.
- Education: Dillard University (BM)
- Occupations: Actor; comedian; singer
- Years active: 1960–present
- Known for: Saturday Night Live; The Wayans Bros.; The Jamie Foxx Show; 2 Broke Girls; Martin
- Spouse: Freda Morris (m. 1984–2018)

Garrett Isaac Morris (born February 1, 1937) is an American actor, comedian and singer. He was part of the original cast and was the first Black cast member of the sketch comedy program Saturday Night Live, appearing from 1975 to 1980. Morris played the character Jimmy on The Jeffersons (1983–1984), and starred as Junior "Uncle Junior" King on the sitcom The Jamie Foxx Show, which aired from 1996 to 2001. He later portrayed Earl Washington on the CBS sitcom 2 Broke Girls, from 2011 to 2017.

Morris is also known for his role in the sitcom Martin as Stan Winters, from 1992 to 1995, until he suffered an injury. He made two guest appearances on The Wayans Bros. in season one, episode one as himself and again on episode ten as the brothers' uncle Leon (1995). He played a concerned teacher in the film Cooley High (1975), Slide in Car Wash (1976), and Carl in The Census Taker (1984). In 2024, Morris was honored with his own star on the Hollywood Walk of Fame.

== Early life and education ==
Morris was born on February 1, 1937, in New Orleans, Louisiana, and grew up in the poverty-stricken Gert Town neighborhood. A church-choir singer from his youth, he trained at the Juilliard School of Music and graduated from Dillard University in 1958. Early in his career, he performed with The Belafonte Folk Singers. In 1960, Morris recorded South African Freedom Songs (EPC-601) with Pete Seeger and Guy Carawan for Folkways Records.

== Saturday Night Live ==
Morris had written a play that Lorne Michaels read and liked, which got Morris hired on as a writer for a program he was developing for Saturday night. Morris was asked about bringing in black actors to potentially serve as cast members, such as asking Bill Duke. Duke wasn't cast, but a suggestion by those who were cast led Michaels to view a film that had Morris in it, Cooley High, which Morris later stated "played a hand" in getting him cast on Saturday Night Live, as produced by Michaels.

Periodically on SNL he sang classical music: once a Mozart aria "Dalla Sua Pace", Don Ottavio's aria from Don Giovanni when guest-host Walter Matthau designated him as a "musical guest...in place of the usual crap", and once a Schubert lied while the titles on the screen expressed his colleagues' purported displeasure at having to accommodate a misguided request by him. In February 1977, he sang Tchaikovsky's Nur wer die Sehnsucht kennt barefoot in colorful Caribbean dress while subtitles explained he had just returned from Jamaica where he had picked up a girl by claiming to be Harry Belafonte.

One of Morris' best known characters on SNL was the Dominican baseball player Chico Escuela. Chico spoke only limited and halting English, so the joke centered on his responding to almost any question with his catch phrase: "Baseball... been berra berra good... to me". Another recurring bit, used in the newscast segment Weekend Update, involved Morris being presented as "Headmaster of the New York School for the hard of hearing" and assisting the newscaster by shouting the main headlines, in a parody of the then-common practice of providing sign language interpretation in an inset on the screen as an aid to the deaf viewer.

According to the book Saturday Night: A Backstage History of Saturday Night Live, Morris was frequently unhappy during his tenure on SNL from 1975 to 1980, and expressed the opinion that he was usually typecast in stereotypical roles. In 2024's Saturday Night, directed by Jason Reitman, which dramatically details SNL's opening night, Morris's restless unhappiness is portrayed by actor Lamorne Morris (no relation).

Black performers who have followed Morris on SNL have at times been publicly concerned with experiencing the same fate Morris did. Eddie Murphy, for example, told TV Guide in the early 1980s that SNL producer Jean Doumanian "had tried to Garrett Morris me".

Morris, then at 38, was the eldest of the original cast members when SNL debuted in 1975. He is also the eldest surviving cast member.

=== Recurring characters ===
- Chico Escuela, a Dominican baseball player for the New York Mets
- Cliff, the streetwise friend to the Festrunk Brothers (Dan Aykroyd and Steve Martin)
- Grant Robinson Jr., one of The Nerds
- Hodo, one of Miles Cowperthwaite's cronies
- Merkon, the leader of the Coneheads
- Weekend Update's "News for the Hard of Hearing" translator, who simply repeated each line while shouting with his hands cupped around his mouth.

== Career ==
=== Theater ===
He performed in a number of Broadway musicals, including Hallelujah, Baby! and Ain't Supposed to Die a Natural Death. In 1965, he worked alongside Amiri Baraka, Sun Ra, Albert Ayler and Sonia Sanchez at the Black Arts Repertory Theatre/School in Harlem; during this period, the theater was frequently raided and surveilled by the New York City Police Department and the Federal Bureau of Investigation.

=== Television ===
In 1971, he had a small role as a police sergeant in The Anderson Tapes and was a cast member in the short-lived CBS sitcom, Roll Out. He also appeared as a high school teacher in the 1975 film Cooley High. In 1976, Morris appeared in the film Car Wash, playing the role of Slide the bookmaker. In 1983 and 1984, Morris appeared in five episodes of The Jeffersons, playing a character named Jimmy. He starred in the 1984 film The Census Taker, a 1984 black comedy directed by Bruce R. Cook.

In 1985, he guested on Murder, She Wrote as Lafayette Duquesne. In 1986, Morris began playing Arnold "Sporty" James, on the NBC cop drama Hunter, starring Fred Dryer and Stepfanie Kramer through 1989. Morris appeared in Married... with Children as Russ, one of Al's poker buddies, in "The Poker Game", in a 1987 season 1 episode and again in the season 3 episode "Requiem for a Dead Barber". He also appeared in the 1992 horror comedy Severed Ties starring Oliver Reed.

Morris also had regular roles on Diff'rent Strokes, The Jeffersons, Hill Street Blues, 227, and Roc. He also appeared in an episode of Who's the Boss, "Sam's Car" (1989), playing the role of Officer Audette. He was a regular cast member on The Jamie Foxx Show, playing Jamie's uncle, Junior King.

In 1998, Morris appeared as himself in the fourth episode of the fifth season of the TV series, Space Ghost Coast to Coast. In 2002, Morris made a cameo appearance on an episode of Saturday Night Live hosted by Brittany Murphy. In 2006, Morris reprised his role as "Headmaster of the New York School for the Hard of Hearing" in a cameo on the TV series Family Guy, in the episode "Barely Legal."

In August 2008, Morris played the role of Reverend Pratt in the family comedy drama film, The Longshots, starring Ice Cube and Keke Palmer.

In 2011, Morris had a cameo role as a Catholic priest on the episode "Three Boys" on the Showtime series Shameless. He was cast as Earl in the CBS comedy 2 Broke Girls, which premiered on September 19, 2011. During the second season he faced a lawsuit from the Global Agency accusing him of not paying 10% of his income from the show as agreed. However, a rep from the show stated that he had not actually failed to do so.

He also appears in an episode of USA Network "Psych" on March 27th 2013

In 2018, Morris appeared in the NBC show This Is Us. In 2019, Morris appeared in the fifth episode of A Black Lady Sketch Show, titled "Why Are Her Pies Wet, Lord?"

=== Mugging ===
In 1994, he was shot by a would-be robber (whom he attempted to fight off) but recovered as he discussed on the January 14, 2016, episode of Marc Maron's podcast WTF. On Howard Stern's radio show on July 20, 1995, Morris said the culprit was imprisoned not for the shooting, but for parole violations for other crimes. In another radio interview, he mentioned that the robber who shot him was eventually convicted and incarcerated. In prison, inmates who happened to be fans of Morris teamed up and beat up the robber in revenge.

At the time of the shooting, Morris was starring on Martin as Martin's first boss, Stan Winters. Morris' shooting rendered him temporarily unable to continue in the role; he was written out of the show by having the character become a national fugitive. The scene where he is about to undergo plastic surgery was shot on the hospital bed Morris occupied while recuperating from the 1994 assault. He made a final appearance as Stan during the show's third season, walking with a cane due to Morris' real injuries, but the reason given for Stan was that he had crashed his car during a police chase.

=== Film ===
1980 Garrett appeared in How to Beat the High Cost of Living, a comedy caper starting Susan Saint James, Jane Curtin, and Jessica Lange. Garrett played the Power and Light Man. In 1985, he appeared in Larry Cohen's science fiction horror film The Stuff, playing cookie magnate Chocolate Chip Charlie, a parody of Famous Amos. In 2015, Morris appeared as a cameo in Ant-Man, referencing an old SNL sketch in which he played the first live-action incarnation of the character. Morris played the town drunk and eventual savior in Children of the Night. (1991)

=== Commercials ===
In 2009, Morris appeared in two TV commercials for the Nintendo DS—one featuring Mario Kart DS, and the other featuring Brain Age: Train Your Brain in Minutes a Day!. In 2010, Morris appeared in a television commercial for Miller Lite. The national commercial, titled "PopPop", features Morris alongside actors Stacey Dash and Jason Weaver. The commercial takes a light-hearted look at a family relationship with Morris playing the grandfather, PopPop, and Weaver as his grandson. Since summer 2010, Morris has appeared in an ad for Orbit gum in the United States.

He also operated and was the host of his own comedy club, The Downtown Comedy Club, in downtown Los Angeles. On February 9, 2007, Los Angeles mayor Antonio Villaraigosa honored Garrett Morris for his work and contributions to the black community. He declared February 9, 2007, Garrett Morris Day and named The Downtown Comedy Club the official club of Los Angeles.

=== Other career endeavors ===
On September 9, 2016, Morris and his family appeared on the ABC's game show Celebrity Family Feud, playing against Alfonso Ribeiro and Ribeiro's friends.

In 2024, Morris was honored with his own star on the Hollywood Walk of Fame.

== Filmography ==
=== Film ===
Year	Title	Role	Notes
1970	Where's Poppa?	Garrett	
1971	The Anderson Tapes	Sgt. Everson	
1975	Cooley High	Mr. Mason	
1976	Car Wash	Slide	
1980	How to Beat the High Cost of Living	Power & Light Man	
1984	The Census Taker	Harvey	
1985	The Stuff	"Chocolate Chip Charlie" W. Hobbs	
1987	Critical Condition	Helicopter Junkie	
1987	The Underachievers	Dummont	
1989	Dance to Win	-	
1991	Children of the Night	Matty	
1991	Motorama	Andy	
1991	Blackbird Fly	-	Short film
1992	Severed Ties	Stripes	
1993	Coneheads	Capt. Orecruiser	
1995	Black Scorpion	Argyle	
1996	Black Rose of Harlem	Wisdom	
1996	Santa with Muscles	Clayton	
1996	Almost Blue	Charles	
1997	Black Scorpion II	Argyle	
1999	Twin Falls Idaho	Jesus	
1999	Palmer's Pick-Up	Tom Bolza	
1999	Graham's Diner	—	
2001	Jackpot	Lester Irving	
2001	How High	PCC Agent	
2003	Connecting Dots	Henry	
2005	The Salon	Percy	
2007	Implanted	Kadar	Short film
2007	Who's Your Caddy?	The Reverend	
2007	Frank	Billy Hamilton	
2007	Amenic	Amenic	Short film
2008	Dog Gone	Police Chief	
2008	The Longshots	Reverend Pratt	
2009	Bed Ridden	Billings	Short film
2009	Just Like Family	Leroy	Short film
2009	Sonny Dreamweaver	God	
2010	Pickin' & Grinnin'	Richard A. Trophey	
2011	Valley of the Sun	Joe	
2011	Let Go	Donuts	
2012	Pawn Shop	Rey	
2012	Freeloaders	Mr. Abaeze	
2015	Ant-Man	Cab Driver	
2019	Grand-Daddy Day Care	Arnold	

=== Television ===
Year	Title	Role	Notes
1960	CBS Workshop	—	Episode: "The Bible Salesman"
1963	General Hospital	Mouth	Regular cast
1973	Roll Out	Wheels−	Main cast
1974	Change at 125th Street	Janitor	Television film
1975–80, 2002, 2015, 2025	Saturday Night Live	Himself / cast member	Main cast (season 1–5), Brittany Murphy/Nelly, 40th Anniversary Special, 50th Anniversary Special
1978	ABC Weekend Special	Frank	Episode: "The Seven Wishes of Joanna Peabody"
1980	Easter Fever	Jack	Voice, television film
1982	Diff'rent Strokes	Santa Claus / Mr. Jones	Episode: "Santa's Helper"
1983	The Invisible Woman	Lt. Greg Larkin	Television film
1983–84	The Jeffersons	Jimmy	Guest (season 9); Recurring cast (season 10)
1984	At Your Service	Dwayne	Television film
1984	Masquerade	Froog	Episode: "The French Correction"
1984	The New Scooby Doo Mysteries	Additional voices	Season 2
1984–85	It's Your Move	Principal Dwight Ellis	Recurring cast
1985	Murder, She Wrote	Lafayette Duquesne	Episode: "Murder to a Jazz Beat"
1985	Hill Street Blues	Derelict	Recurring cast (season 5)
1985	The Twilight Zone	Jake	Episode: "Dealer's Choice"
1985	Scarecrow and Mrs. King	Asam Ali Shamba	Episode: "The Wrong Way Home"
1985	Pound Puppies	Chief Williams	Voice, television film
1986	The Love Boat	Gary Samuels	Episode: "The Will / Déjà Vu/ The Prediction"
1986	New Love, American Style	—	Episode: "Love and the Teddy"
1986–89	Hunter	Arnold "Sporty" James	Guest (season 2); Recurring cast (season 3–5)
1987	227	Bob Winslow	Episode: "The Working Game"
1987–89	Married... with Children	Russ	2 episodes
1988	Who's the Boss?	Officer Audette	Episode: "Sam's Car"
1991	Earth Angel	Joey	Television film
1991–92	Roc	Wiz	Recurring cast (season 1)
1992	Maid for Each Other	Harold Brown	Television film
1992–95	Martin	Stan Winters	Main cast (season 1–2); Guest (season 3)
1993	Daddy Dearest	Stan	Episode: "American We"
1994	ER	Edgar Luck	Episode: "ER Confidential"
1995	The Wayans Bros.	Uncle Leon / Himself	2 episodes
1995	Minor Adjustments	Willie	Episode: "The Ex-Files"
1995	Cleghorne!	Sidney Carlson	Main cast
1996–2001	The Jamie Foxx Show	Uncle Junior King	Main cast
1997	Happily Ever After: Fairy Tales for Every Child	Buzzard	Voice, episode: "Pinocchio"
1997	Boston Common	Sammy Sutherland	Episode: "I.D. Endow"
1998	Space Ghost Coast to Coast	Himself	Episode: "Cahill"
1999	G vs E	Kentucky McQuaid	Episode: "Sunday Night Evil"
2000	City of Angels	Dr. Frank Hollister	Episode: "Prototype"
2000	Static Shock	Preacher	Voice, episode: "Child's Play"
2000	Little Richard	Carl Rainey	Television film
2001	Justice League	Al McGee	Voice, episode: "In Blackest Night" Pt. 1
2001	According to Jim	Lewis	Episode: "The Turkey Bowl"
2001	The Hughleys	Father Roberts	Episode: "I'm Dreaming of a Slight Christmas"
2003	Maniac Magee	Mr. Cobble	Television film
2005	Noah's Arc	Rev. Allen	2 episodes
2006	All of Us	Uncle Cyrus	Episode: "Neesee's Grave Plot"
2006	Family Guy	Himself	Episode: "Barely Legal"
2007	Halfway Home	Jimmy the Mailman	Episode: "Halfway Impotent"
2007	Frangela	Dave	Television film
2011	Shameless	Old Priest	Episode: "Three Boys"
2011–17	2 Broke Girls	Earl Washington	Main cast
2013	Psych	Clizby	Episode: "100 Clues"
2017	Rhett & Link's Buddy System	Ignatius	Recurring cast (season 2)
2018	MacGyver	Willy	Episode: "Mardi Gras Beads + Chair"
2018	Scandal	Hector	Episode: "Army of One"
2018	Knight Squad	Old Fizzwick	Episode: "Working on the Knight Moves"
2018	This Is Us	Lloyd	Recurring cast (season 2); Guest (season 3)
2019	A Black Lady Sketch Show	Deacon Jones	Episode: "Why Are Her Pies Wet, Lord?"
2020	Family Reunion	Grand Sensei Shandu	Episode: "Remember When Shaka Got Beat Up?"
2020	Station 19	Earl Davis	Episode: "Poor Wandering One"
2020	Self Made	Cleophus Walker	Main cast
2021	Fairfax	Albert	Voice role; Episode: "Fairfolks"
2021	Grand Crew	Narrator	Episode: "Pilot"
2023	How I Met Your Father	Julian	Episode: "Midwife Crisis"
2025	The Neighborhood	Jasper	Episode: "Welcome to the Yippedy-Dip"
