= Greg Mullavey =

American film and television actor (born 1939)

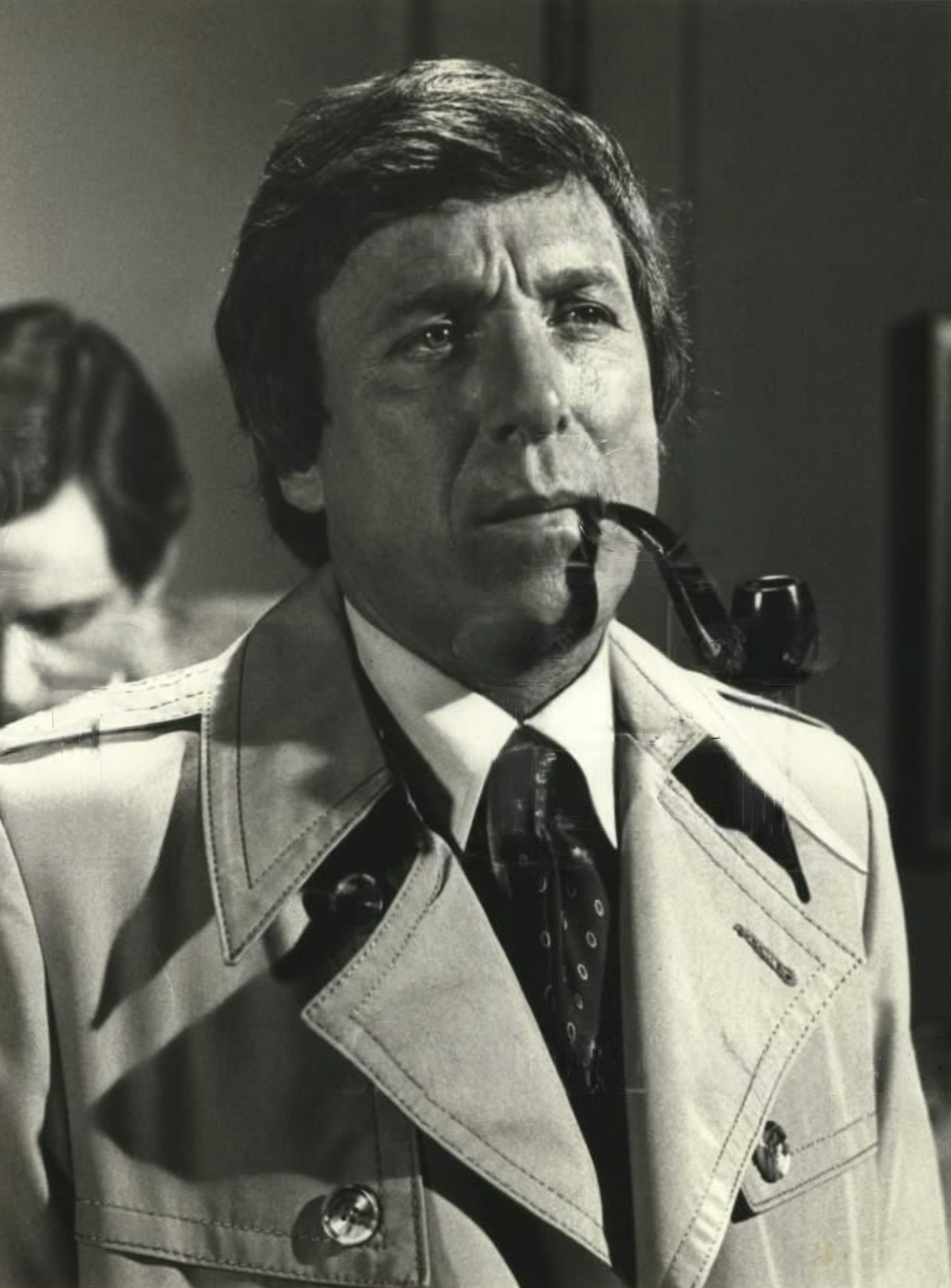
- Mullavey in B. J. and the Bear, 1981
- Born: Gregory Thomas Mulleavy Jr. September 10, 1939 (age 86); Buffalo, New York, U.S.
- Education: Hobart College
- Occupation: Actor
- Years active: 1963–present
- Spouse: Meredith MacRae (m. 1969; div. 1987)
- Partner: Ariana Johns (1999–present)
- Children: 1
- Parent: Greg Mulleavy (father)

Greg Mullavey (born Gregory Thomas Mulleavy Jr.; September 10, 1939) is an American film and television actor who has had roles as Tom Hartman in the television series Mary Hartman, Mary Hartman and Carly and Spencer's grandfather in iCarly. He has appeared on and off Broadway, and continues to act on stage, having appeared in over a hundred theatre productions across North America.

== Career ==
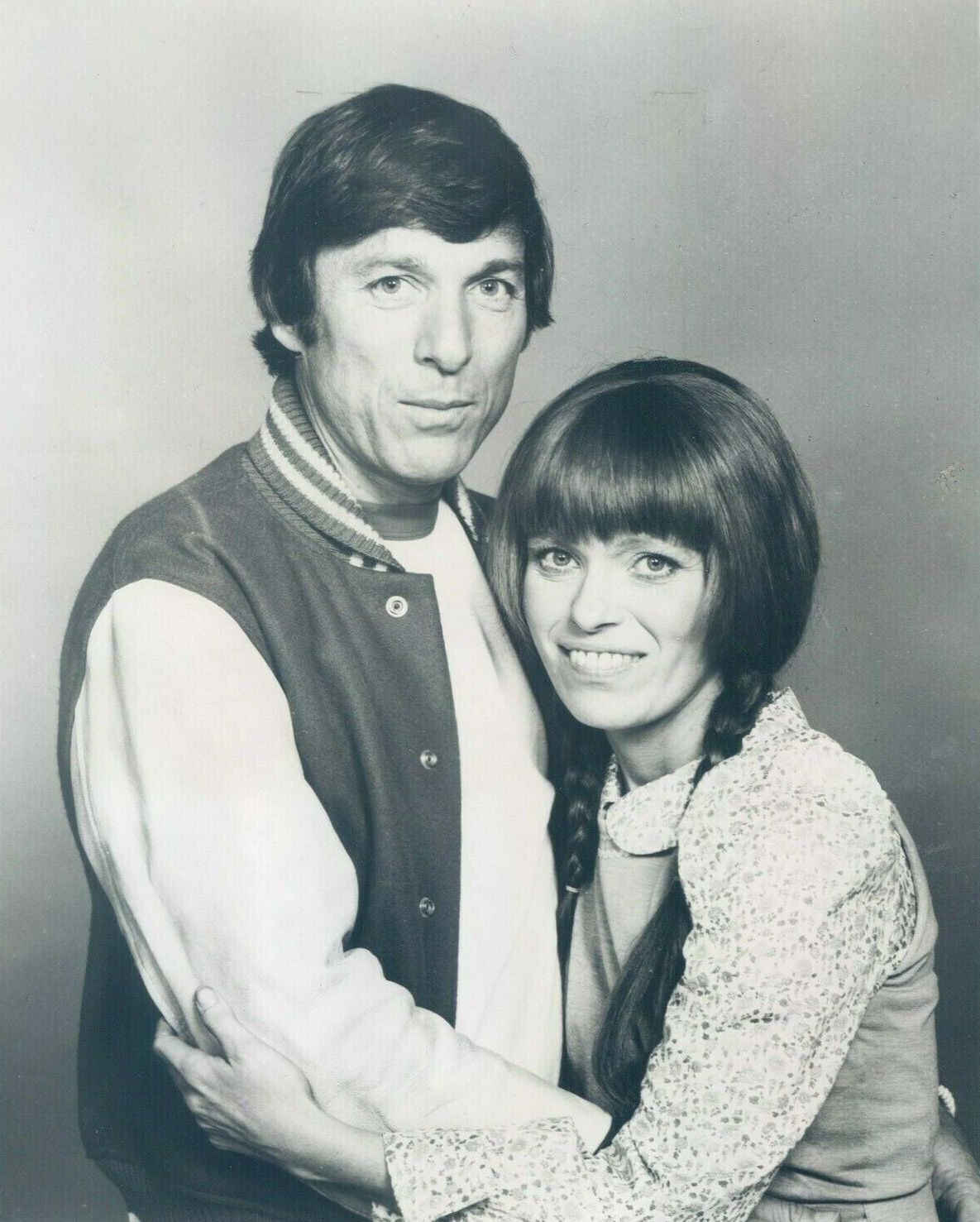
Mullavey with costar Louise Lasser in a 1976 press photo for Mary Hartman, Mary Hartman

Mullavey was born in Buffalo, New York, and changed the spelling of his surname from Mulleavy to avoid confusion with his father, who also had the same name. He appeared on television series including Storefront Lawyers, Blue Light, The Rockford Files, M*A*S*H, All in the Family, Bonanza, Family, Combat!, The Virginian, and Hawaii Five-O. He played Eddie Gallagher on Rituals, as well as Carly and Spencer's grandfather on iCarly. Mullavey played Tom Hartman on the iconic 1970s comedy Mary Hartman, Mary Hartman, and Mule Canby in the TV miniseries Centennial. He played Biff in the Tales from the Darkside episode (2/12) "Monsters in my Room" (1985).

His movie credits include Bob & Carol & Ted & Alice (1969), C.C. and Company (1970), Raid on Rommel (1971), The Birdmen (1971), The Love Machine (1971), The Christian Licorice Store (1971), I Dismember Mama (1972), Stand Up and Be Counted (1972), The Single Girls (1974), The Disappearance of Flight 412 (1974), The Hindenburg (1975, as Herbert Morrison), and The Census Taker (1984).

Onstage, he appeared opposite Marlo Thomas in the 2015 New York debut of Joe DiPietro's play Clever Little Lies at the Westside Theatre.

== Personal life ==
His father, Greg Mulleavy, played major league baseball for the White Sox and Red Sox and was a third base coach for the Brooklyn Dodgers and L.A. Dodgers. Note that father and son spelled their last name differently.

Mullavey was married to actress Meredith MacRae from 1969 until 1987, when they divorced; they had one child, daughter Allison Mullavey (b. 1974). He never remarried but has lived with actor/writer Ariana Johns since 1999.
