= Carroll Seghers II =

American photographer

Carroll Seghers II (May 28, 1924 – April 17, 2004) was an American photographer, who as a leading member of the creative photo revolution in the 1960s and 1970s, helped produce advertising for brands like Texaco, Marlboro, American Express, Chrysler, United Airlines, Coca-Cola and Kodak, among many others.

Seghers spent almost four decades in advertising, winning several Clio Awards, as well as being a featured contributor to Life Magazine. Selected works are also included in the Permanent Collection of the Museum of Modern Art in New York City.

He rose to prominence by winning both the First Prize for Individual Pictures, as well as Second Honorable Mention in the Photo Story category of Life Magazine's Photo Contest for Young Professionals in 1951 for his photos of black religious spiritualism. His work submitted beat photographer Robert Frank for First Prize.

== Early life ==
Carroll Seghers II was born in Cincinnati, Ohio, and moved with his parents to Coral Gables, Florida when young. As a pilot and flight instructor during World War II, Seghers was stationed in Columbus, Mississippi and Sheppard Field in Wichita Falls, Texas, where he was one of the first 19 helicopter pilots in the Army Air Forces.

His photographic talent was first discovered while on his honeymoon in Europe, when he snapped a picture of the street capture of a famous thief by French police, which was immediately solicited by newspaper and wire services. It was an experience that transformed him forever.

It was on this honeymoon where he formed a friendship with fellow photographer Ernst Haas.

== Books published ==
In 1960, he co-produced a picture book on Colonial Williamsburg, titled, "Adventure in Williamsburg".

In 1979, he wrote and photographed the subjects for a book on women mountain climbers, titled "The Peak Experience (Hiking and Climbing for Women)", published by Bobbs-Merrill Inc.

== Selected awards ==
- First Prize for Individual Pictures, Life Magazine, 1951
- Second Honorable Mention for Photo Story Category, Life Magazine, 1951
- Best of Series, First Place Awards, Missouri School of Journalism, 1955

== Other notable work ==
He shot the cast of the TV show I've Got a Secret for the cover of TV Guide Magazine in 1963.
