= Lori Saunders =

American actress (born 1941)

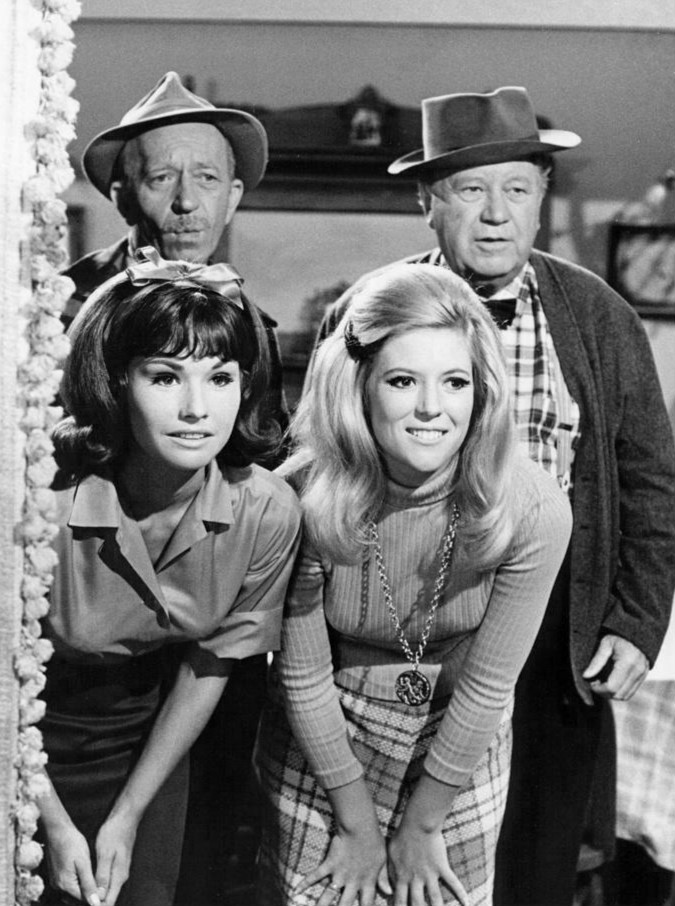
- Back, L-R: Frank Cady, Edgar Buchanan. Front: Lori Saunders, Meredith MacRae on TV's Petticoat Junction (1968)
- Born: Linda Marie Hines; October 4, 1941 (age 84); Kansas City, Missouri, U.S.
- Occupation: Actress
- Years active: 1960–1980
- Known for: Petticoat Junction
- Spouse: Bernard Sandler (m. 1961)
- Children: 2

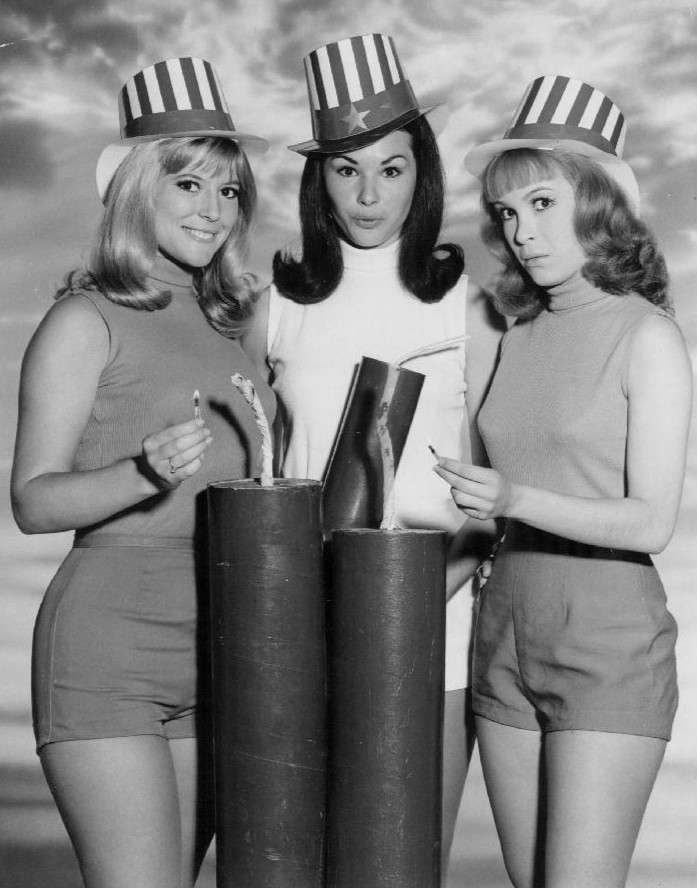
Meredith MacRae, Lori Saunders, and Linda Kaye Henning on Petticoat Junction (1967)

Lori Saunders (born Linda Marie Hines in Kansas City, Missouri; October 4, 1941) is an American film and television actress, probably best known as the second Bobbie Jo Bradley in the television series Petticoat Junction (1965–1970).

== Television ==
=== Starring roles ===
Saunders played brunette middle-sister Bobbie Jo Bradley in 3 episodes of Green Acres, 147 episodes of the rural sitcom Petticoat Junction, and 7 episodes of The Beverly Hillbillies. In Petticoat Junction, she took over the role in 1965 from Pat Woodell, who left the show to focus on her singing career. Co-star Meredith MacRae, who joined the show in 1966, said in a 1960s interview that she and Lori were very close, "like the Bobbsey twins", since they were both married and had each replaced another actress on the series.

She played Elizabeth "Betty" Gordon, one of Mr. Drysdale's secretaries, in the last season of The Beverly Hillbillies.

In 1973–74, Saunders played Betsy on the situation-comedy western Dusty's Trail. Created by Sherwood Schwartz and starring Bob Denver, the show was based on Gilligan's Island, but set in the wild west; her character Betsy was an ingénue drawn after Dawn Wells' character of "Mary Ann". Saunders quipped: "It was the same show, just no coconuts." She said it was interesting to work with Jeannine Riley, who had also starred in Petticoat Junction (as Billie Jo Bradley), but not at the same time as Saunders.

In 2015, she appeared in a MeTV commercial promoting Petticoat Junction, along with fellow cast members Linda Kaye Henning and Gunilla Hutton.

=== Guest-starring roles ===
In her early television years, Saunders appeared five times (credited as Linda Marie Hines) as four different characters on The Adventures of Ozzie and Harriet. She also appeared in Burke's Law, and the season four episode "The Prairie Elephant" of Rawhide (original air-date November 17, 1961). She appeared in the 1970 episode "Bringing Up Josh" of Daniel Boone, and also in the anthology series Bob Hope Presents The Chrysler Theatre.

== Film ==
She appeared in the cult horror film Blood Bath (1966), credited as Linda Saunders. Other films include: A Day at the White House (1972), So Sad About Gloria (1973), Captive (1980), The Girls on the Beach, (1965) and Mara of the Wilderness (1965, as Linda Saunders).

== Music ==
In the 1960s, Saunders released the single "Lonely Christmas", with the B-side "Out of Your Mind". The latter song was later featured on the compilation album Girls in the Garage, Vol. 02.

Saunders and her Petticoat Junction co-stars Linda Kaye Henning and Meredith MacRae released several singles in the 1960s as the singing group The Girls from Petticoat Junction, including "If You Could Only Be Me" (1968) and "Thirty Days Hath September". Their music is compiled on the album The Girls from Petticoat Junction: Sixties Sounds.

== Personal life ==
Saunders married Bernard Sandler in 1961. They have two children. The couple campaigned against the elephant ivory trade in the 1980s. As there was another "Linda" (Linda Kaye Henning) credited on Petticoat Junction, Saunders officially changed her first name to "Lori" in the fall of 1965. Saunders retired from acting in 1980.
