= Census Taker =

Soundtrack album by The Residents
- Released: 1985
- Genre: Rock
- Label: Episode
- Producer: The Residents

The Residents Soundtracks chronology
Whatever Happened To Vileness Fats? (1984)	Census Taker (1985)	Hunters (1995)

Professional ratings
Review scores
Source	Rating
AllMusic	3/5 stars

The Census Taker is the soundtrack to the 1984 movie of the same name, released in 1985.

The soundtrack was composed by The Residents and included some new tracks, such as "Hellno" and "Where Is She," as well as some reworked older songs. The first edition was pressed on red vinyl; subsequent pressings were on black.

== Track listing ==
1. "Creeping Dread"
2. "The Census Taker"
3. "Talk"
4. "End of Home"
5. "Emotional Music"
6. "Secret Seed"
7. "Easter Woman/Simple Song"
8. "Hellno"
9. "Where Is She"
10. "Innocence Decayed"
11. "Romanian/Nice Old Man"
12. "Margaret Freeman"
13. "Lights Out/Where Is She"
14. "Passing the Bottle"
15. "The Census Taker Returns"

== Personnel ==
The Residents: Performance

Sandy Sandwich: Guitar
