= Linda Kaye Henning =

American actress & singer (born 1944)

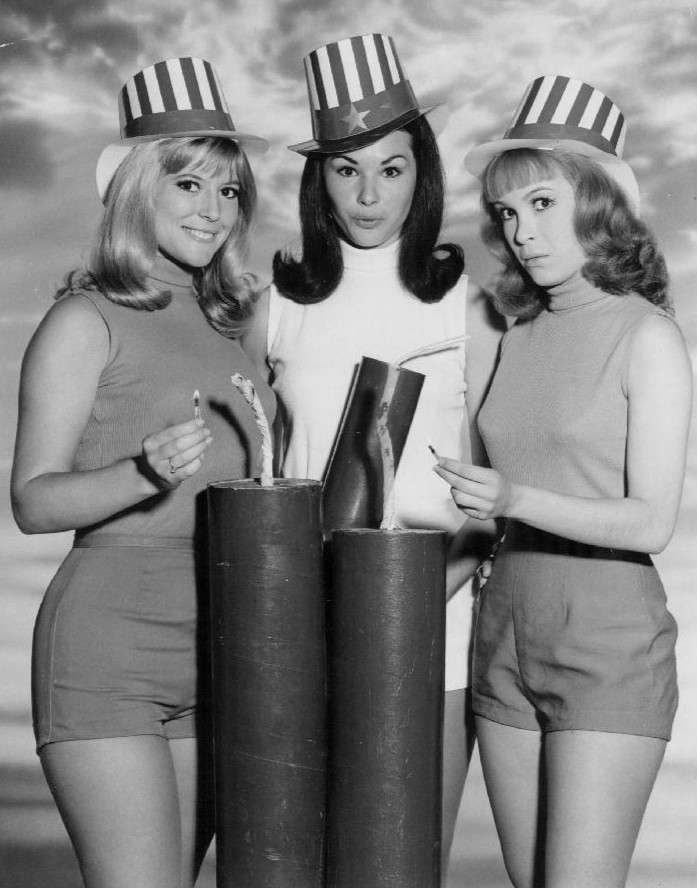
- Henning (right) with Petticoat Junction costars Meredith MacRae (left) and Lori Saunders (center), in a 1967 publicity photo
- Born: September 16, 1944 (age 81); Los Angeles, California, U.S.
- Other name: Linda Kaye
- Occupations: Actress; singer
- Years active: 1963–2007
- Known for: Petticoat Junction
- Spouse(s): Mike Minor (m. 1968; div. 1973); Leon Ashby Adams (m. 1994)

Linda Kaye Henning (born September 16, 1944) is an American actress and singer most notable for starring in the 1960s sitcom Petticoat Junction.

== Career ==
Henning began to focus on acting in her late teens. Her career began in 1953. Her earliest acting roles include Rebel Without a Cause, Bus Stop and Gidget. She was cast as a dancer in the Columbia Pictures film Bye Bye Birdie (1963). She appeared in numerous musicals, including High Button Shoes, Brigadoon and The Sound of Music.

Henning made many TV appearances from the 1960s through the 1980s on a variety of programs, including The Ed Sullivan Show, Adam-12, Happy Days, Mork & Mindy, The Facts of Life and The Tonight Show. She provided the voice of Jethrine Bodine on The Beverly Hillbillies. She made dramatic appearances in Hunter and Capitol and in Sliders as Mrs. Mallory. Her many game-show appearances include Family Feud, Match Game, Hollywood Squares, The Perfect Match, Three for the Money, Password, Tattletales, Showoffs, Password Plus and Body Language. She was a substitute hostess on the 1974–1976 daytime edition of High Rollers.

Henning's most notable role was as Betty Jo Bradley in the CBS series Petticoat Junction, which ran from 1963 until 1970. She was one of only three cast members, along with Edgar Buchanan and Frank Cady, to remain throughout the show's entire run and appeared in all but three of the 222 episodes. She was billed for the first five seasons of the series as Linda Kaye. From Season 6 (Fall 1968) until the show was canceled, she was billed by her full name. In some episodes in later years, Henning and her television sisters (played by Meredith MacRae and Lori Saunders) sang in a trio, and she often sang duets with costar and future husband Mike Minor, who played Steve Elliott.

In Season 1, the Bradley sisters were joined by a friend, played by Sheila Kuehl, in a band called the Ladybugs, which was created to compete with Beatlemania. Henning, Kuehl, Jeannine Riley and Pat Woodell appeared as moptop singers performing "I Saw Him Standing There" on a March 1964 episode of The Ed Sullivan Show, just weeks after the Beatles had performed "I Saw Her Standing There."

== Personal life ==
Henning was born in Los Angeles to television producer Paul Henning and his wife Ruth.

In 1968, Henning married Mike Minor, who played Steve Elliott on Petticoat Junction one year after the wedding of Betty Jo and Steve. The real-life couple divorced in 1973. Henning married actor Leon Ashby Adams in 1994.
