= Petticoat Junction =

American television sitcom (1963–1970)

- Title screen from seasons 1–2
- Created by: Paul Henning; Ruth Henning
- Starring: Bea Benaderet; Edgar Buchanan; Linda Kaye Henning; Jeannine Riley; Pat Woodell; Gunilla Hutton; Lori Saunders; Meredith MacRae; Smiley Burnette; Jimmy Hawkins; Charles Lane; Rufe Davis; Frank Cady; Mike Minor; Elna Danelle Hubbell; June Lockhart; Jonathan Daly; Higgins
- Theme music composer: Curt Massey
- Composer: Curt Massey
- Country of origin: United States
- No. of seasons: 7
- No. of episodes: 222 (list of episodes)

Production
- Executive producers: Jay Sommers; Charles Stewart
- Camera setup: Single-camera
- Running time: 25 minutes
- Production companies: Filmways; CBS Productions

Original release
- Network: CBS
- Release: September 24, 1963 – April 4, 1970

Related
- The Beverly Hillbillies; Green Acres

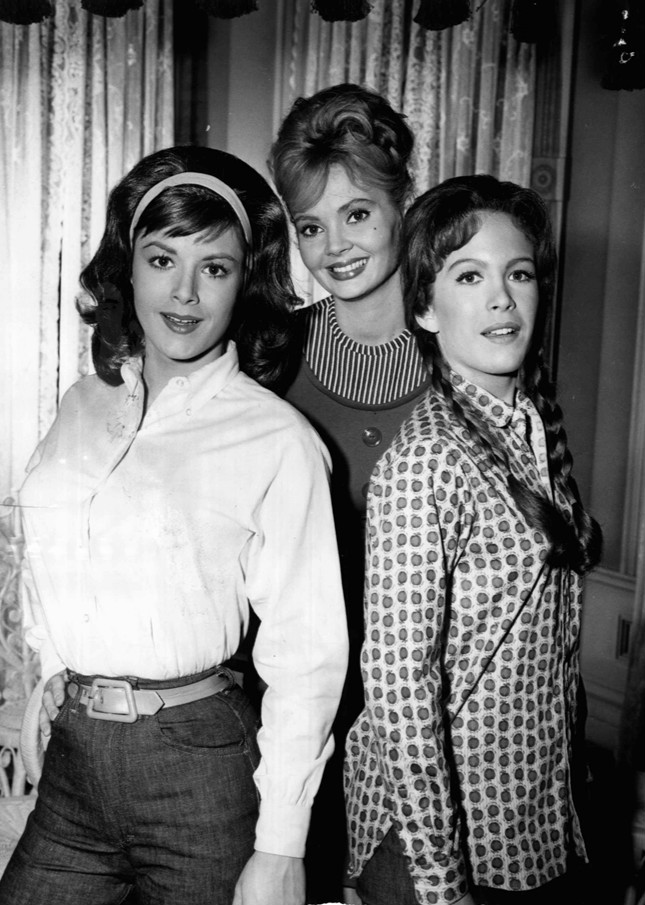
Cast members from seasons 1-2, L-R: Pat Woodell (Bobbie Jo), Jeannine Riley (Billie Jo) and Linda Kaye Henning (Betty Jo)

Petticoat Junction is an American television sitcom that originally aired on CBS from September 1963 to April 1970. The series takes place at the Shady Rest Hotel, which is run by Kate Bradley (played by Bea Benaderet); her three daughters Billie Jo, Bobbie Jo, and Betty Jo; and her uncle Joe Carson. The series is one of three interrelated shows about rural characters produced by Paul Henning. Petticoat Junction was created upon the success of Henning's previous rural/urban-themed sitcom The Beverly Hillbillies (1962–1971). The success of Petticoat Junction led to a spin-off, Green Acres (1965–1971). Petticoat Junction was produced by Filmways, Inc. and CBS Productions.

== Premise ==
The show centers on the goings-on at the rural Shady Rest Hotel. Widowed Kate Bradley (Bea Benaderet) is the proprietress. Her lazy but lovable Uncle Joe Carson (Edgar Buchanan) supposedly helps her in the day-to-day running of the hotel, while she serves as a mediator in the various minor crises that befall her three beautiful daughters: redhead Betty Jo (Linda Kaye Henning); brunette Bobbie Jo (first Pat Woodell, later Lori Saunders); and blonde Billie Jo (first Jeannine Riley, then Gunilla Hutton, and finally Meredith MacRae). Uncle Joe, when he is not idling in his favorite porch chair, frequently comes up with half-baked get-rich-quick schemes and ill-conceived hotel promotions which end up with him making a fool of himself.

Early on, much of the show also focuses on the Hooterville Cannonball, an 1890s vintage steam-driven train run more like a taxi service by railroad engineer Charley Pratt (Smiley Burnette) and Floyd Smoot (Rufe Davis) who is the fireman, conductor, baggageman, and sometimes engineer. It was not uncommon for the Cannonball to make an unscheduled stop for the crew to go fishing, or to pick fruit for Kate's apple butter and pies. The single-tracked Hooterville to Pixley branch line was cut off from the rest of the C. & F. W. Railroad 20 years before the start of the show by flood damage to a trestle. This branch line proceeds north to Pixley and was originally connected to the C. & F. W. Railroad main line that runs between Melton (to the west on the main line) and Skidmore (to the east on the main line). Delta is a town on the rail line and is located south of Melton. Charley and Floyd are alternately depicted as retired employees of the railroad receiving pensions and salaried railroad workers.

Many plots involve railroad executive Homer Bedloe's futile attempts to cease operation and scrap the Hooterville Cannonball. Occasionally, youngest daughter Betty Jo can be found with her hand on the Cannonball's throttle; running the train is one of her favorite pastimes, as she is something of a tomboy with an interest in mechanics.

Trips on the Cannonball usually include a stop in Hooterville ("Elev. 1427") at Drucker's Store, run by Sam Drucker (Frank Cady). Drucker's is the local hub, where menfolk come to play checkers and chat. Sam Drucker is the postmaster, editor of the newspaper, Justice of the Peace, county clerk, water commissioner, marshal, deputy sheriff and occasionally the mayor. His telephone is a lifeline for the Bradleys, Uncle Joe, and others. The fictional Hooterville became the main town for Green Acres in which Sam Drucker still ran Drucker's Store. Pixley was apparently the county seat although a nearby community was "Bugtussle," the original home of Jed Clampett and his family from The Beverly Hillbillies.

== Setting ==
Regarding the show's title, Petticoat Junction, the hotel is located at a water stop, not a junction (where two or more railroad lines meet). The train stop is nicknamed "petticoat junction" because the Bradley sisters often skinny dip in the railway's water tower and leave their petticoats draped over the side. The opening titles of the series show their petticoats hanging on the tower while they are swimming offscreen.

The Shady Rest Hotel is located at a water stop along the isolated branch line of the C. & F.W. Railroad. Due to a trestle demolition many years ago, the line now is entirely unconnected to any other railroad; it runs between the rural farm community of Hooterville and the small town of Pixley. Each of these towns is about 25 miles (40 km) away from the hotel, which is located roughly at the midpoint of the line. Kate Bradley says that her stubborn grandfather built the hotel there because that was where the lumber fell off the train. The town of Pixley, at one end of the Cannonball's route, was named for Pixley, California. A number of location shots were filmed in the real Pixley. The exact location of Hooterville is never mentioned on Petticoat Junction or Green Acres. Clues given to the location of Hooterville often conflict with each other, but nearby mentions of towns and counties place it in Southwest Missouri.

The Shady Rest is an old-fashioned, Victorian-style hotel, accessible primarily by train (and a poorly maintained fire road), where guests share bathing facilities and eat together with the family at a large dining-room table. Kate Bradley cooks sumptuous meals on a wood-burning stove, and her specialty is chicken 'n' dumplings. Meals were prepared for the show by property master Vince Vecchio. In a 1966 interview, Bea Benaderet said, "I suspect that Vince is better at cooking things like mother used to than anybody's mother ever was."

== Show history ==
The idea for Petticoat Junction came from Paul Henning's wife, Ruth. Paul Henning said,

The Shady Rest was based on a real hotel in Eldon, Missouri, run by my wife's grandmother... that's where the hotel and the train and the whole setting came from, from Ruth's reminiscences of visiting her grandma.

Ruth Henning told him stories of her childhood adventures at the Burris Hotel, which was owned by her grandparents in Eldon. Once called the Rock Island Hotel, the Burris was located next to the now-derelict Rock Island Line railroad tracks. Ruth Henning's mother, Alice (Burris) Barth, also told her many stories about the hotel and about growing up in the small town of Eldon. The stories of Ruth and her mother, Alice, became the basis of the show.

Linda Kaye Henning said that her father "wrote the series for Bea Benaderet." Paul Henning thought the show would make an ideal starring vehicle for the veteran character actress. Since the 1930s, Benaderet had played second-banana roles on radio and television to such personalities as Jack Benny, Lucille Ball, and George Burns and Gracie Allen. She was an uncredited voice actress for many Warner Bros. cartoons, and provided the voice of Betty Rubble on The Flintstones. She also played the semiregular character Cousin Pearl Bodine on season one of The Beverly Hillbillies. Henning felt that Benaderet had more than paid her dues and had earned the right to headline her own series.

During preproduction, proposed titles for the show were Ozark Widow, Dern Tootin', and Whistle Stop.

=== Reception ===
Cleveland Amory of TV Guide wrote an unfavourable review of the show, citing a slow pace, weaknesses in the two senior actors (Benaderet and Buchanan), the "hillbilly budget," and storytelling which was either totally unfunny or only intermittently funny. " . . . the kindest thing you can say about this show is that you haven't seen it."

=== Tone and character changes ===
For the first three seasons, Petticoat Junction centered on homespun humor and the village's backward mindset. Beginning in season four, however, the show gradually took on a different feel. Stories began to focus more on the Bradley sisters, specifically on the romance of Steve and Betty Jo, who became key characters. The show became more of a domestic comedy. Musical numbers and singing became prominent. Songs featured the Bradley sisters singing as a trio, Billie Jo solo, Steve solo, or Steve and Betty Jo as a duet. Sometimes, as many as two or three songs were in each episode.

The additions of Mike Minor as Steve Elliott and Meredith MacRae as the third Billie Jo influenced this change, as they were both accomplished singers. The characters of Billie Jo and Bobbie Jo also changed. Billie Jo went from being a boy-crazy dumb blonde to a strong, independent young lady. Bobbie Jo went from being book-smart (nicknamed "the walking encyclopedia") to more of a bubble-head used for comic relief.

Kate Bradley's appearance also changed. In the first two seasons, Kate's wardrobe and hair style depicted her as a dowdy country farm woman. Beginning with the third year (in color), her clothing and coiffure were much more flattering and appealing, and she wore high heels.

=== Death of Bea Benaderet ===
Sickness kept Bea Benaderet away for the last third of season five as she dealt with lung cancer. She missed two episodes (#159 and 160), returned for one (#161), then missed eight more. Storylines dealt with Kate's absence by having other characters say that she was out of town, although it was never stated where she was or what she was doing. Paul Henning brought in temporary replacement mother-figures Rosemary DeCamp (as Kate's sister Helen) and Shirley Mitchell (as Kate's cousin Mae). In January 1968, it was announced that Benaderet's treatment was successful, and she returned for the fifth-season finale ("Kate's Homecoming") that aired on March 30, 1968. Benaderet's performance showed the effects of her cancer treatment, as she appeared noticeably thinner and weaker. Following the conclusion of her treatment, she had revealed to the Press-Republican that despite her lengthy absence, series producer Charles Stewart would continue to write her as the lead for the upcoming sixth season.

At the start of the 1968–69 season, Benaderet had completed the first two episodes "Birthplace of a Future President" and "The Singing Sweethearts" when her cancer was found to have returned. The third episode, "Only a Husband", was her final physical appearance on the show, in which she shared a brief scene with Mike Minor and was conspicuously absent from the other scenes that were written for her. Linda Kaye Henning recalled in 2008: "The last few shows we knew she was very ill. … She was not well enough to do the episode where I have the baby." When Paul Henning realized that Benaderet would not recover, he decided that the fourth episode of season six would be the birth of Betty Jo's baby, so Benaderet's character could be included. In this episode, titled "The Valley Has a Baby", Benaderet provided only her voice for scenes of Betty Jo and Steve reading a letter from Kate; her speaking to Cannonball engineer Wendell Gibbs over the phone and using the handcar with him to get to the hospital; and her presence at Betty Jo's bedside after the baby's arrival. The latter segments featured Benaderet's stand-in, actress Edna Laird, portraying Kate with her back to the camera. The episode additionally featured three short flashbacks of Kate from season five: "You Know I Can't Hear You When the Thunder Is Clapping", where Betty Jo reveals to Kate that Steve and she are in love; "A Cottage for Two", where Betty Jo's dream house turns out to be an old shack; and "With This Gown I Thee Wed", where Steve and Betty Jo get married. The episode aired just 13 days after Benaderet's death on October 13, 1968.

Benaderet was popular with viewers, and her fan mail increased during her illness as she received many get-well cards and letters from fans. In the first five years of Petticoat Junction, she was indisputably the star of the show. As a result, the absence of her character had to be handled delicately. In the 1950s and 1960s, it was almost unheard of for a main character on a television show to die, particularly on a situation comedy. The producers and CBS decided to continue the show, and Kate Bradley continued to be referred to as being "out of town." Benaderet's name was removed from the opening credits and Edgar Buchanan received star billing for the remainder of the series. Referring to the hotel, the opening theme lyrics were changed from "It is run by Kate, come and be her guest at the Junction" to "It's a really friendly place come to be our guest at the Junction" to "It is run by Joe, come and be his guest at the Junction". Although Petticoat Junction was still beloved by fans, the central premise of a country family was lost without a motherly figure. The long absence of Kate was only mentioned once in passing during the final two seasons. In the season-seven premiere "Make Room For Baby", the Bradley sisters and baby Kathy Jo return from swimming in the water tower. Steve has paternal qualms about his daughter's safety, to which Billie Jo and Bobbie Jo wistfully reply: "Mom taught all of us to swim before we could walk. And in the same old water tower, too."

=== Seasons six and seven ===
Choosing not to recast the Kate Bradley role, or to sign Rosemary DeCamp on full-time (she was also playing the mother of Marlo Thomas on That Girl), the producers introduced the new character of Dr. Janet Craig, played by June Lockhart, who had just come from a three-year run as Maureen Robinson on Lost In Space. Previously, Lockhart had played another mother figure - Ruth Martin on the CBS-TV series Lassie. Lockhart's character was essentially brought on as a surrogate mother figure to fill the void left by the death of Bea Benaderet, and takes up a medical practice at the hotel and also serves as a counsel of sorts for the girls. The cast was described as "most welcoming" to Lockhart as the newcomer during a difficult time. Quickly, Lockhart graduated from featured billing at the end of each episode to co-star billing in the opening credits. The show's theme song lyrics were slightly altered to accommodate the change in cast.

A decline in Nielsen ratings had begun in season five, when CBS moved the show from Tuesday night to Saturday night. In season six, the show failed to make the ratings top 30. With Benaderet's death and the mediocre ratings, the sitcom's future was hanging in the balance. CBS considered canceling the show in the spring of 1969. The season-six finale "Tune In Next Year" was meant to be the series finale. Dr. Janet Craig receives a good job offer in another city and decides to accept it. However, at the end of the episode, Dr. Craig decides to stay when Steve and Betty Jo announce that they are going to have another baby.

At the last minute, CBS decided to renew the series for a seventh season. The main reason for the renewal was that it would give the series five full years of color episodes for syndication, which would be very profitable for the network. When the show returned for its seventh and final season in September 1969, two major plotline changes were made. The first is that Steve and Betty Jo, and their daughter Kathy Jo, move out of their cottage and back into the Shady Rest Hotel. The storyline involving Betty Jo's new pregnancy was dropped and never referred to again. The second change is the addition of bumbling, but well-meaning, game warden Orrin Pike (played by actor Jonathan Daly), who becomes Bobbie Jo's boyfriend, much to the annoyance of Uncle Joe. In the spring of 1970, despite somewhat improving ratings, Petticoat Junction was canceled as a precursor to the CBS rural purge of the early 1970s, when all rural-themed shows were canceled. Its final first-run episode was broadcast on April 4, 1970, and the series officially ended its primetime run on Saturday, September 12, 1970, at 9:30 pm. It was replaced one week later by The Mary Tyler Moore Show.

Petticoat Junction did not have a series finale. However, "Last Train to Pixley", the fourth-to-last episode to air, is in some ways like a series finale. In the episode, Hooterville Cannonball engineer/conductor Floyd Smoot decides to retire. The residents of the Shady Rest Hotel and Sam Drucker all take a ride on the Cannonball and recall (with flashbacks) such treasured memories as fishing from the train, a very pregnant Betty Jo driving the train when she is about to give birth, and the Christmas-time Cannonball decorated with lights. During the episode, Floyd sings the song "Steam, Cinders and Smoke", which was written by former cast member Smiley Burnette. It was released as a single in 1964 by Burnette and Rufe Davis (who played Floyd Smoot). At the end of the episode, Floyd decides not to retire when the people of Hooterville write him letters asking him to stay.

== Characters ==
=== Main characters ===
- Kate Bradley (portrayed by Bea Benaderet in seasons 1–6) - The proprietor of the Shady Rest Hotel.
- Uncle Joe Carson (portrayed by Edgar Buchanan) - The lazy but lovable uncle of Kate who helps to run the hotel. He would usually come up with get-rich-quick schemes and different promotions for the hotel which always goes comically awry. In season six following Bea Benaderet's death, Joe became the sole proprietor of the Shady Rest Hotel.
- Betty Jo Bradley-Elliot (portrayed by Linda Kaye Henning) - The red-haired youngest daughter of Kate and grandniece of Joe who is a tomboy. In season five, Betty would get engaged to Steve Elliott.
- Billie Jo Bradley (portrayed by Jeannine Riley in seasons 1–2, Gunilla Hutton in season 3, Meredith MacRae in season 4–7) - The blonde-haired daughter eldest of Kate and the grandniece of Joe who was originally boy crazy before becoming an independent woman.
- Bobbie Jo Bradley (portrayed by Pat Woodell in seasons 1–2, Lori Saunders in seasons 3–7) - The brunette-haired middle daughter of Kate and grandniece of Joe who was a bookworm before becoming a "bubble-head".
- Steve Elliott (portrayed by Mike Minor in seasons 4–7) - A crop duster who is friends with the Bradley family. In season five, he would get engaged to Betty Joe.
- Floyd Smoot (portrayed by Rufe Davis in seasons 1–5,7) - The conductor/fireman of the Hooterville Cannonball.
- Charley Pratt (portrayed by Smiley Burnette in seasons 1–4) - The train driver of the Hooterville Cannonball.
- Sam Drucker (portrayed by Frank Cady) - The proprietor of Drucker's General Store in Hooterville that the characters would often visit.
- Dr. Janet Craig (portrayed by June Lockhart in seasons 6–7) - A physician who works at the Shady Rest Hotel during seasons six and seven.

=== Recurring characters ===
- J. Homer Bedloe (portrayed by Charles Lane) - The vice-president of the C&FW (Chicago & Far Western) Railroad.
- Wendell Gibbs (portrayed by Byron Foulger) - An engineer.
- Orrin Pike (portrayed by Jonathan Daly) - A game warden who is the love interest of Bobbie Joe Bradley.
- Selma Plout (portrayed by Virginia Sale in 1964–1965, Elvia Allman in 1966–1970) - A nosy busybody who is Kate's rival.
- Newt Kiley (portrayed by Kay E. Kuter) - A farmer who owns a farm that is over 80 miles long.
- Roger Budd (portrayed by Jack Bannon)
- Henry Brewster (portrayed by Garrison True)
- Kathy Jo Bradley (portrayed by Elna Hubbell) - The daughter of Betty Jo Bradley and Steve Elliott.

== Cast ==
- Bea Benaderet as Kate Bradley (seasons 1–6)
- Edgar Buchanan as Uncle Joe Carson
- Linda Kaye Henning as Betty Jo Bradley (Becomes Betty Jo Elliott in Season 5)
- Mike Minor as Steve Elliott (seasons 4–7)
- Jeannine Riley as Billie Jo Bradley (seasons 1–2)
- Gunilla Hutton as Billie Jo Bradley (season 3)
- Meredith MacRae as Billie Jo Bradley (seasons 4–7)
- Pat Woodell as Bobbie Jo Bradley (seasons 1–2)
- Lori Saunders as Bobbie Jo Bradley (seasons 3–7)
- Frank Cady as Sam Drucker
- Smiley Burnette as Charley Pratt (seasons 1–4)
- Rufe Davis as Floyd Smoot (seasons 1–5; recurring season 7)
- June Lockhart as Dr. Janet Craig (seasons 6–7)
- Byron Foulger as Wendell Gibbs (season 6)
- Jonathan Daly as Orrin Pike (season 7)

=== Cast notes ===
The only actors who appeared in all seven seasons were Edgar Buchanan, Linda Kaye Henning, and Frank Cady. Buchanan was the only one to appear in every episode. Linda Kaye Henning appeared in all but two episodes: "Bobbie Jo and the Beatnik" (Season 1); and "Have Library, Will Travel" (Season 2). Edgar Buchanan, who portrayed Bea Benaderet's character's uncle, was only three years older than Benaderet in real life.

The season-three cast in 1966. On table: Higgins the dog; front row (L-R): Lori Saunders (Bobbie Jo), Bea Benaderet (Kate), Edgar Buchanan (Uncle Joe); back row (L-R): Frank Cady (Sam Drucker), Gunilla Hutton (Billie Jo), Linda Kaye Henning (Betty Jo), Rufe Davis (Floyd Smoot), Smiley Burnette (Charley Pratt)

Veteran character actor Charles Lane played Cannonball nemesis Homer Bedloe in 24 episodes. Lane said that he perfected his stern curmudgeon character-type on I Love Lucy. Recalling in 1981 his many roles, he said "They were all good parts, but they were jerks. If you have a type established, though, and you're any good, it can mean considerable work for you." The New York Times reported that Lane's persona was so familiar to the public, "that people would come up to him in the street and greet him, because they thought they knew him from their hometowns."

In the first-season episode #32 "Dog Days At Shady Rest", Higgins, the actor dog, was featured as "Sheba", the dog of Betty Jo's boyfriend Orville Miggs (played by actor Jimmy Hawkins). That episode gave the producers an idea. It was decided at the start of the 1964–1965 season to add a new character to The Shady Rest - a dog. As a result, Higgins became a regular cast member. His first appearance was in the second season opener "Betty Jo's Dog". In that installment, coming home on the first day of school, Betty Jo meets a little male dog who immediately attaches himself to her and the Bradley family. Kate, at first, is against keeping him but by the end of the episode, she is won over by him and allows him to stay. Also, in that episode, the subject of Higgins's name is addressed. At first, different names are suggested by the sisters when he first arrives ("Spike", "Prince", and "Byron"), but they never decide, so the dog at that time is not actually named. Eventually, the character's name becomes simply "Dog" or "Boy". Press releases for the show referred to him as the "Shady Rest Dog". (The fifth-season episode "Higgins, Come Home" (broadcast January 27, 1968) refers to the dog's real name, but the title itself is not displayed on the episode.) Higgins remained with the show until its cancellation in 1970. During that time, he won a PATSY Award, and he also was cover-featured on an issue of TV Guide. Higgins had a close rapport with Edgar Buchanan. In the official cast pictures taken each year during the run of Petticoat Junction, Buchanan is shown holding or petting the dog. Higgins went on to star in the successful 1974 film Benji which also featured Buchanan in a cameo role. Linda Kaye Henning indicated in a TV interview her father, the show's producer, had planned to run a contest to name the dog but that never materialized and thus the dog was left without a "proper" name.

Another new character was introduced for the 1964–65 season to serve as a female nemesis for Kate Bradley - Selma Plout. Virginia Sale briefly reprised her role in the first season of Green Acres (her character is not mentioned by name, but is listed in the end credits). During the third season, Elvia Allman (who had appeared in season one as Gladys Stroud) was brought on as Cora Watson for one episode (a role she reprised on Green Acres the same season). Starting with Season 3 (1965–1966), Sale's Selma was replaced by Allman. She appeared in 19 episodes in all, which extended to the end of season 7 (1969–1970). Selma's daughter Henrietta Plout (first played by Susan Walther in season 3 then by Lynette Winter) was introduced at the same time and appeared in seven episodes over the next three seasons. Selma tries repeatedly to marry off the seemingly homely girl, the butt of many "plain Jane" jokes. In her next-to-last episode, the Bradley sisters give Henrietta a glamorous makeover and she is revealed to be quite attractive.

Mike Minor first appeared on the series as Selma Plout's son Dan in the second-season episode "Mother Of The Bride" that aired December 15, 1964. After that episode, the character of Dan Plout is never seen again. Two years later, in the fall of 1966, Mike Minor rejoined the series as handsome crop duster Steve Elliott. Steve is originally the love interest of eldest daughter Billie Jo, but later marries (youngest daughter) Betty Jo.

The three Bradley sisters (played by Linda Kaye Henning, Pat Woodell, and Jeannine Riley) form a Beatlesque band called "The Ladybugs" with their friend Sally Ragsdale (Sheila James) in the season-one episode "The Ladybugs". They wear mop-top wigs and perform the Beatles song "I Saw Her Standing There" with the word "Him" substituted for "Her". On March 22, 1964, mere days before this episode aired, the four actresses performed this same song as "The Ladybugs" on The Ed Sullivan Show. Ed invited his viewers to tune in later that week to see the girls on their show.

Frank Cady, who played Sam Drucker, was the only actor in television history to play the same recurring character on three different shows at the same time. He was a regular on Petticoat Junction and Green Acres, in addition to some late series guest appearances on The Beverly Hillbillies.

Benaderet had played Mrs. Granby on the short-lived 1950 radio show Granby's Green Acres. This show was the inspiration for the Petticoat Junction spin-off Green Acres. The Mrs. Granby character was altered on television and became Lisa Douglas, played by Eva Gabor. Jack Bannon, Benaderet's son, played small parts over the course of the show, usually as a boyfriend or date for one of the Bradley girls. Byron Foulger played two different recurring characters on Petticoat Junction. In the early seasons, he was banker Mr. Guerney, and in later seasons, he was train engineer Wendell Gibbs. Jimmy Hawkins appeared in five episodes as Betty Jo's love interest Orville Miggs.

In season seven, Steve and Betty Jo's baby Kathy Jo was played by Elna Danelle Hubbell. In season six, Kathy Jo was played (uncredited) by infant twins Heather and Barbara Whiter. Heather said her sister and she landed the role when their mother heard that the producers were looking for red-haired babies. She also said that she has no first-hand memories of working on the show.

=== Cast changes ===
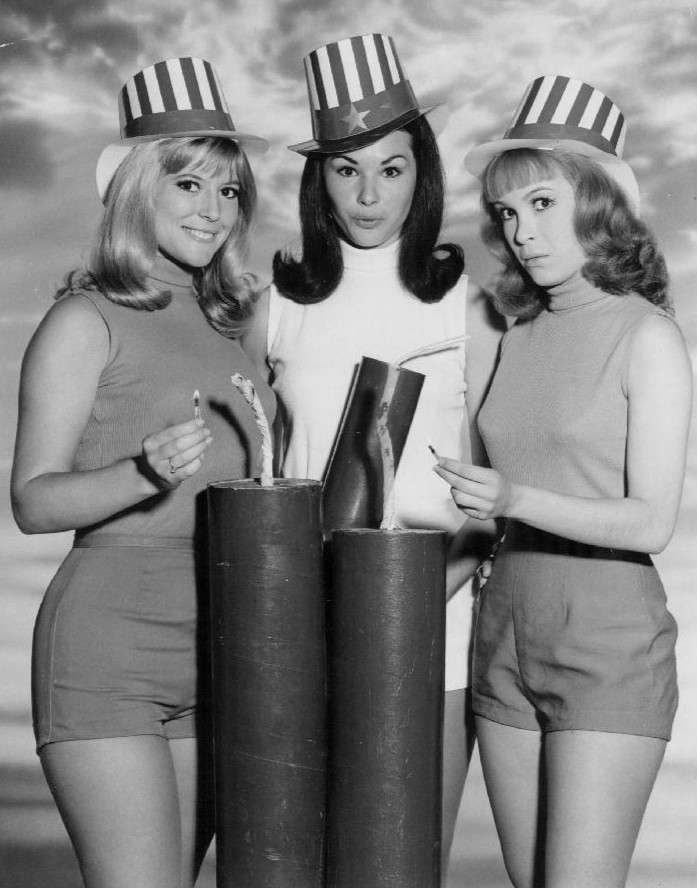
1967 cast, L-R: Meredith MacRae (Billie Jo), Lori Saunders (Bobbie Jo), and Linda Kaye Henning (Betty Jo)

Billie Jo was originally to be played by Sharon Tate. Though a cast photo was taken with Tate, she never appeared in the show. Though long rumored possible explanations for Tate's replacement include the emergence of racy photos of Tate, the reality is that Martin Ransohoff, Filmways producer, felt she simply was not prepared for a central role, and her agents convinced her to pass up the opportunity. Billie Jo was played for the first two seasons (1963–65) by Jeannine Riley, who left to pursue a movie career. In the third season (1965–66), Riley was replaced by Gunilla Hutton (not present for 11 episodes), and for the rest of the show's run, Billie Jo was played by Meredith MacRae.

Bobbie Jo was played in the first two seasons (1963–65) by Pat Woodell, who left the series to start a singing career. In some scenes in a few episodes, when Pat Woodell was unavailable, Bobbie Jo was shown only from behind, with a double standing in. For the remaining seasons, the character was played by Lori Saunders. Woodell and Saunders resembled each other physically, but the character of Bobbie Jo was gradually revamped after the cast change, going from a shy bookworm to a humorous scatterbrain. After Saunders took over the role, she at times gave her lines "a slightly daffy delivery." The show writers picked up on this and gradually changed the character of Bobbie Jo from Paul Henning's original conception of a brainy introvert into "a high-spirited, delightfully ditzy extrovert."

In 1967, the show suffered its first loss when Smiley Burnette (engineer Charley Pratt) died of leukemia right after filming wrapped for the fourth season. During the show's fifth season (1967–1968), Floyd Smoot (Rufe Davis) took over running the train alone as engineer and conductor. The absence of Burnette's character of Charley was explained by allusions in several episodes to his death. Floyd was replaced the following season by Wendell Gibbs, played by Byron Foulger. During the show's last season (1969–70), Foulger had become too ill to continue and did not appear. Davis guested as Floyd Smoot for two episodes, one of them being "Last Train to Pixley". He was also addressed off-screen in one episode as an invisible character. Coincidentally, Foulger died on the same day that the final episode of Petticoat Junction aired: April 4, 1970.

Bea Benaderet, who played the main character Kate Bradley, died in 1968 after a two-year illness with lung cancer; June Lockhart then joined the show as Dr. Janet Craig, a mother figure to the girls, from 1968 until the show's end in 1970.

== Episodes ==
Season	Episodes	Premiered	Ended
1	38	September 24, 1963	June 9, 1964
2	36	September 22, 1964	June 15, 1965
3	34	September 14, 1965	May 10, 1966
4	32	September 13, 1966	May 9, 1967
5	30	September 9, 1967	March 30, 1968
6	26	September 28, 1968	March 29, 1969
7	26	September 27, 1969	April 4, 1970

== Reunions ==
Petticoat Junction was the only one of Paul Henning's country trio not to return in an updated reunion movie. In the 1970s, Meredith MacRae and Linda Kaye Henning tried to produce Hello Again Hooterville: A Thanksgiving Reunion, but the project never came to fruition. The game show Family Feud featured a Petticoat Junction cast reunion in 1983, when Frank Cady, Linda Kaye Henning, Lori Saunders, Gunilla Hutton, and Meredith MacRae (Edgar Buchanan had died in 1979) competed against cast members from The Brady Bunch.

In 1990, the character of Sam Drucker appeared in Return to Green Acres, in what was Frank Cady's final acting role. In 1981, Linda Kaye Henning and Charles Lane both appeared in The Return of the Beverly Hillbillies, but not as Betty Jo and Homer Bedloe. Henning played a secretary named Linda, and Lane played Chief.

== Green Acres and Beverly Hillbillies crossovers ==
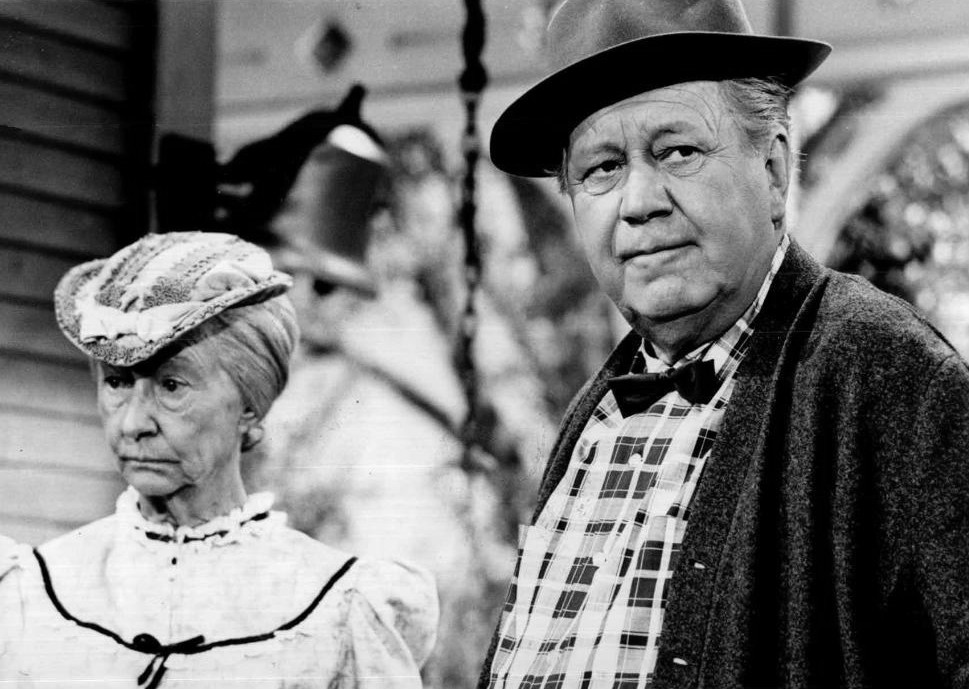
Irene Ryan as "Granny" from The Beverly Hillbillies with Edgar Buchanan (1968)

Petticoat Junction is set in the same fictional universe as Green Acres. Both shows are set in Hooterville, and they share such characters as Sam Drucker, Newt Kiley, and Floyd Smoot. A number of core Green Acres characters, such as Fred and Doris Ziffel (originally named "Ruthie" after Paul Henning's wife, Ruth), Arnold the Pig, Newt Kiley, and Ben Miller, first appeared on season two of Petticoat Junction, which saw a number of scripts written by Green Acres creator Jay Sommers. Characters in all of Henning's creations often crossed over into one another's programs, especially during the first two seasons of Green Acres.

During Petticoat's run from 1963 to 1968 (up until Kate Bradley's last few appearances at the beginning of season six), and with the exception of Green Acres, not once was there ever a connection to The Beverly Hillbillies even though Bea Benaderet had played Cousin Pearl Bodine during the latter's first season (Benaderet reprised the role for a brief cameo in the sixth season). Despite this, in a 1968 episode of Petticoat (#175 "Granny, the Baby Expert"), Granny comes to Hooterville to tend to Betty Jo and Steve's baby. Prior to her visit, she reminds Jed that he is related to Kate through Pearl and then later when she arrives at the Shady Rest she mistakes Uncle Joe for Kate and says "They's right about you Kate, you and Cousin Pearl are lookalikes." The episode is also part two of a three-episode crossover with Hillbillies that begins on "Granny Goes to Hooterville" and concludes on "The Italian Cook".

Other crossover shows feature the Clampetts spending Thanksgiving and Christmas of 1968 in Hooterville on The Beverly Hillbillies ("The Thanksgiving Story", "The Week Before Christmas", "Christmas in Hooterville", and "Drysdale and Friend"). Finally, two consecutive 1970 episodes of The Beverly Hillbillies ("Buzz Bodine, Boy General" and "The Clampett-Hewes Empire") with a visiting Miss Jane and Mr. Drysdale, who mistakenly believes billionaire Howard Hughes lives in Hooterville.

=== Crossovers with Green Acres ===
The following is a list of Petticoat Junction episodes featuring characters from Green Acres. Only those that debuted on Acres before Junction are counted.

Season Three

- Episode 2: "The Baffling Raffle" – Oliver Wendell Douglas, Lisa Douglas
- Episode 3: "The Dog Turns Playboy" – Oliver Wendell Douglas
- Episode 4: "The Good Luck Ring" – Oliver Wendell Douglas, Lisa Douglas
- Episode 5: "Joe Carson, General Contractor" – Oliver Wendell Douglas, Lisa Douglas
- Episode 6: "Bobbie Jo's Sorority" – Oliver Wendell Douglas, Lisa Douglas
- Episode 7: "A Doctor in the House" – Oliver Wendell Douglas
- Episode 8: "Hooterville-A-Go-Go" – Oliver Wendell Douglas, Lisa Douglas
- Episode 10: "Betty Jo Goes to New York" – Oliver Wendell Douglas, Lisa Douglas
- Episode 13: "Uncle Joe Plays Post Office" – Oliver Wendell Douglas
- Episode 19: "Yogurt, Anyone?" – Oliver Wendell Douglas
- Episode 21: "The County Fair" – Mr. Haney
- Episode 29: "Kate Bradley, Peacemaker" – Oliver Wendell Douglas
- Episode 32: "The Young Matchmakers" – Lisa Douglas

Season Four

- Episode 1: "Young Love" – Eb Dawson
- Episode 5: "The All-Night Party" – Eb Dawson
- Episode 11: "The Runt Strikes Back" – Eb Dawson
- Episode 13: "The Santa Claus Special" – Eb Dawson
- Episode 26: "Author! Author!" – Eb Dawson

Season Five

- Episode 3: "One Dozen Roses" – Eb Dawson

Season Six

- Episode 4: "The Valley Has a Baby" – Oliver Wendell Douglas, Lisa Douglas
- Episode 14: "The Ballad of the Everyday Housewife" – Lisa Douglas

Season Seven

- Episode 3: "The Other Woman" – Mr. Haney
- Episode 9: "A Most Momentous Occasion" – Mr. Haney

== Theme song ==
Curt Massey sang the Petticoat Junction theme song. The song was composed by Massey and Paul Henning. Flatt and Scruggs recorded a version of the song "Petticoat Junction".

- The Moody Brothers' 1989 Grammy-nominated country instrumental "The Great Train Song Medley" featured the song "Petticoat Junction".

The DVD release of the series by Brentwood Home Video replaced Massey's music with John Hickman's "Banjo Signal". The DVD release of the series by TGG Direct, Inc. replaces Massey's music with Frank Hutchison's "Train That Carried the Girl From Town". Both editions retain screen credit to Massey.

== Syndication ==
After its cancellation, Filmways and Paul Henning's company sold the show along with The Beverly Hillbillies after that show's cancellation to CBS. Its distribution has changed hands over the years due to corporate changes involving Viacom, which in 2006 split into two separate companies. Today, CBS Media Ventures handles syndication.

The color (1965–70) episodes were shown in syndication for many years after the show's cancellation. However, the rights to the black-and-white (1963–65) episodes were not resolved, and they were not included in the syndication package until MeTV began broadcasting the black-and-white (1963–65) episodes on July 12, 2011. The airings of the black-and-white episodes were short lived, and on July 21, 2011, MeTV started airing the color episodes once again. MeTV began to air the first two black-and-white seasons of the show again on November 4, 2013. The show has rotated on and off of the MeTV schedule in various time slots. On March 12, 2018, Decades TV Network and on April 23, 2018, Punch TV Studios began broadcasting the black-and-white episodes; both networks continued through with the color episodes.

The color episodes have run constantly, with the show running on TV Land from 1996 to 2000. The show ran on the Retro Television Network from 2005 to 2008, and on MeTV beginning in June 2012. The program has run on three different Canadian cable channels: Prime TV from 2000 to 2002, DejaView from 2005 to 2008, and on TV Land Canada from 2006 to 2010.

As of April 2019, the original black-and-white episodes of Petticoat Junction were airing on the Retro Television Network and Circle TV.

== Home video ==
The black-and-white episodes from season one are now in the public domain, their copyrights having lapsed. As a result, numerous discount DVDs of these episodes have been released, although with generic bluegrass-like theme music instead of the familiar opening and closing music, which is still under copyright.

The Paul Henning Estate holds the original film elements to the first two seasons' black-and-white episodes, with the original opening and closing theme song. In 2005, it licensed 20 black-and-white episodes from season one to be released on the "Ultimate Collection" DVD set via MPI Home Video. It features the first 20 episodes of the series excluding "Cannonball Christmas".

"The Beverly Hillbillies and Petticoat Junction: Ultimate Christmas Collection" DVD was released in 2005, with three themed episodes including "Cannonball Christmas" and new extras.

In 2008, CBS Home Entertainment (distributed by Paramount Home Entertainment) released the unaltered first season on DVD with new cast member interviews, original broadcast commercials.

The second season was released in 2009, concluding the show's black-and-white episodes (it switched to color from the third season onward). The DVD also contained episode introductions and an interview with two cast members.

In 2013, the "Return to Hooterville" DVD was released to commemorate the show's 50th anniversary. It contains one episode, "A Cannonball Christmas", and over three hours of behind-the-scenes documentaries, interviews, archival footage, outtakes and more.

On October 1, 2013, the third season was released on DVD as a Walmart exclusive. It received a full retail release on April 15, 2014. This is the only release to date to include English SDH subtitles.

In 2019, the "Seasons 1-3" DVD set was released in the US; it was released in Australia in 2017 but from Shock Entertainment and coded for region 4.

As of 2025, the show's last four seasons have yet to be released on DVD.

US DVDs	Ep#	Release date	Label
Ultimate Collection	20	August 30, 2005	MPI Home Video
Ultimate Christmas Collection (with The Beverly Hillbillies)	3	October 25, 2005	MPI Home Video
The Official First Season	38	December 16, 2008	Paramount Home Entertainment
The Official Second Season	36	July 7, 2009	Paramount Home Entertainment
Return to Hooterville	1	March 12, 2013	MPI Home Video
The Official Third Season	34	April 15, 2014	Paramount Home Entertainment
Seasons 1–3	108	May 14, 2019	Paramount Home Entertainment

== Hooterville Cannonball ==
Motion shots of the Hooterville Cannonball were filmed on the Sierra Railroad, based in Jamestown, California. The steam locomotive used was the 4-6-0 (ten-wheeler) engine Sierra No. 3, which has the distinction of appearing in more movies than any other locomotive and is disguised as the first classmate engine No. 8. Its first sound film appearance was in 1929 with Gary Cooper in The Virginian, and it has since appeared in many other Westerns, including a prominent role in the climactic ending of Back to the Future Part III as the second classmate engine No. 131. It was also used in such television shows as Little House on the Prairie and The Iron Horse, as well as the TV series and movie Wild Wild West as the third classmate engine No. 5 and The Color of a Brisk and Leaping Day as the fourth classmate engine No. 27 and Casey Jones as the fifth classmate engine No. 1. Today, the Sierra No. 3 locomotive is still operational and located at Railtown 1897 State Historic Park.

A full-sized locomotive replica of the engine was used for studio scenes in and around the locomotive cab. The prop locomotive was provided by the Hoyt Hotel in Portland, Oregon. It was displayed in the lobby of the hotel as part of the décor of its Barbary Coast Lounge, hence the screen credit at the end of each episode "Train furnished by Barbary Coast, Hoyt Hotel, Portland, Oregon". The replica of the engine still exists, although it has been restored to its pre-Petticoat Junction appearance as a locomotive called the Emma Sweeny, and is on public display under shelter in Santa Rita Park in Durango, Colorado.

== Real-world entertainment ==
=== Petticoat Junction Amusement Park ===
There was an amusement park in Panama City Beach, Florida, named "Petticoat Junction Amusement Park", which opened in 1963 (the same year that the show first aired) and closed in 1984, 14 years after the show ended. According to author Tim Hollis, the park's owners (the Churchwell family), were friends with Edgar Buchanan. He talked to Paul Henning, who okayed the park being named after the show. As would be expected, there was a steam railroad attraction at the park, the 3 ft (914 mm) narrow gauge Petticoat Junction Railroad. Although the park is closed, the locomotives and train cars from its railroad attraction have survived. They were bought at auction by the late Fred H. Hallmark in 1985 and are kept and preserved on his family's property at 9485 US-31 in Kimberly, Alabama.

=== Petticoat Junction Cafeteria and Shady Rest Hotel ===
In 1965, Claudia and J.T. "Peavine" Westmoreland bought an old train depot in Mabank, Texas, and converted it into a restaurant. Since the restaurant was next to a working railroad line, the customers nicknamed it "Petticoat Junction", and the name was made official. Specialties at the Petticoat Junction Cafeteria included chicken fried steak and homemade coconut cream pies. The real-life Petticoat Junction was like the fictional show. In her memoirs, Claudia writes: "The train crew grew to be a part of the Petticoat Junction. They would stop and eat with us and we looked forward to the once a day run." In 1966, the Southern Pacific Railroad sent work crews to elevate the railroad track. Claudia set up makeshift bedrooms for the workers and called it the "Shady Rest Hotel". More permanent lodgings were soon added. Claudia's daughter Ann recalled: "Mother got people from the television show to send her photos of the Petticoat Junction set, the actors, just all kinds of things." The business was relocated one mile west in the 1970s and an RV park was added. The Petticoat Junction Cafeteria and Shady Rest Hotel lasted until 1996.

=== Other "Shady Rest" Locations ===
In the town of Woodstock, New York, is a hamlet called Shady; a rooming house operating there since 1968 is called "The Shady Rest Townhouse", as an homage to the hotel in Petticoat Junction.
