= Gunilla Hutton =

Swedish-born American actress and singer (b. 1944)

- Born: May 15, 1944 (age 82); Gothenburg, Sweden
- Occupations: Actress; singer
- Years active: 1965–present
- Known for: Petticoat Junction; Hee Haw

Gunilla Hutton (born May 15, 1944) is a Swedish-born American former actress and singer, perhaps best known for her roles as the second Billie Jo Bradley (1965–1966) on Petticoat Junction and as a regular cast member in the television series Hee Haw until 1992. She was raised in Fort Worth, Texas.

== Early years ==
Born in Gothenburg, Sweden on May 15, 1944, Hutton arrived in the United States at age 7, speaking no English.

== Career ==
Hutton started playing Billie Jo on Petticoat Junction at the beginning of the show's third season and left at the end of that season. During her lone season on Petticoat Junction (1965–66), Hutton appeared in 23 of its 34 episodes.

She appeared in Perry Mason, The Love Boat, and Murder Can Hurt You (1980). In 2015, she appeared in a MeTV commercial promoting Petticoat Junction with cast members Linda Kaye Henning and Lori Saunders. Hutton also played "Nurse Goodbody"' on the country music comedy Hee Haw for its entire run. Her predecessor character, Billie Jo Bradley, on Petticoat Junction, Jeanine Riley was also a Hee Haw regular during its early days on CBS.

Hutton sang in personal appearances and recorded two singles for ABC/Dot Records.

== Personal life ==
For about a year or so, Hutton was involved in an extramarital relationship with Nat King Cole. Hutton has been said to have telephoned Cole's wife Maria Cole to tell her to divorce him. Maria, in turn, confronted her husband, and Cole ended his relationship with Hutton after being diagnosed with terminal lung cancer.

Later, Hutton married former Air Force pilot Allan Freeman. They had 3 children together and remained married for 43 years until his death in 2014. He was her second husband.

== Discography ==
=== Singles ===
- "You Can Say the Prettiest Things Sometimes" b/w "The Greatest Story Never Told" (1972)
- "Chowchilla Dust" b/w "We've Got Old Fashioned Love" (1973)
- "You're Gonna Get Loved" b/w "See the Lady Cryin" (1974)
- "Cody" b/w "The End of Our Love Song" (1975)
