= Jeannine Riley =

American actress (born 1940)

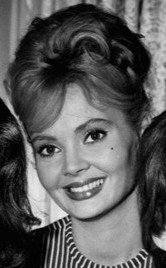
- Riley in 1964
- Born: Jeannine Brooke Riley; October 1, 1940 (age 85); Fresno, California, U.S.
- Education: Pasadena Playhouse
- Occupation: Actress
- Years active: 1962–1991
- Known for: Petticoat Junction

Jeannine Brooke Riley (born October 1, 1940) is an American actress.

== Early years ==
The daughter of Mr. and Mrs. James Riley, she was born in Fresno, California, and moved with her family to Madera, California, after her father left the Army. She spent two years training at the Pasadena Playhouse.

== Career ==
Early in her career, Riley performed on television in Fresno and in underwater ballet at a hotel.

She appeared in guest roles on numerous television series (Route 66, The Man from U.N.C.L.E., The Wild Wild West) and a few feature films such as The Big Mouth (1967), Fever Heat (1968), The Comic (1969) and Electra Glide in Blue (1973). In 1963, Riley appeared as Amelia Pryor on The Virginian in the episode "Run Away Home." Also in 1963 on Wagon Train in the episode "The Davey Baxter Story".

Winning the role over 300 competitors, Riley portrayed Billie Jo Bradley on the first two seasons of the CBS sitcom Petticoat Junction (1963–1965). Riley left the series in 1965 to pursue movies. She also had a regular cast member role on the comedy variety series Hee Haw (1969–1971). She played Lulu McQueen (a take-off on Ginger Grant, played by Tina Louise, from Gilligan's Island) on the western sitcom Dusty's Trail, which aired in 1973–74.

In 2020, Riley released The Bolder Woman: It's About Time (ISBN 979-8550679210), a book she wrote "to instruct women how they can still fulfill their dreams no matter how old they get.

== Partial filmography ==
- Five Finger Exercise (1962) - Girl (uncredited)
- Strike Me Deadly (1963) - Lori Grant
- The Big Mouth (1967) - Bambi Berman
- Fever Heat (1968) - Sandy Richards
- The Comic (1969) - Lorraine Margaret Bell
- Electra Glide in Blue (1973) - Jolene
- The Outfit (1973) - Prostitute (uncredited)
- The Wackiest Wagon Train in the West (1976) - Lulu McQueen
- Lone Star Bar & Grill (1983) - Arlene
- Timebomb (1991) - Landlady (final film role)
