= Naomi Stevens =

American actress (1925–2018)

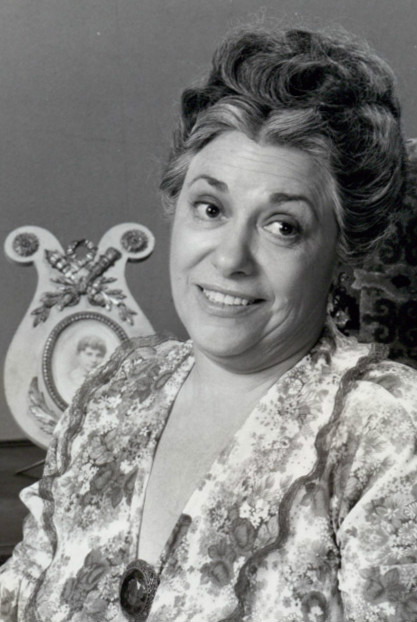
- Stevens as Rose Montefusco in The Montefuscos (1975)
- Born: Naomi Ruth Stevens; November 29, 1925; Trenton, New Jersey, U.S.
- Died: January 13, 2018 (aged 92); Reseda, Los Angeles, California, U.S.
- Occupation: Actress
- Years active: 1956–1989
- Spouse: Robert Burns Jr. (m. 1948; died 2012)
- Children: 1

Naomi Ruth Stevens (November 29, 1925 – January 13, 2018) was an American character actress of film and television from the 1950s through the 1980s. She appeared in almost 100 roles over the years, usually depicting mothers, landladies, gossips, or neighbors.

Stevens began entertaining in vaudeville at age 2. She had expanded into radio, film, and theater by age 5. She appeared on a radio program on KNX in Los Angeles and was featured in Paramount Pictorials. Stevens attended the Grace Waugh Bowman School of Theatricals.

Her most frequent characterizations were Italian, Jewish, Latin, or East European, and usually with a comic touch. She appeared in many television series and in such feature films as Valley of the Dolls; Buona Sera, Mrs. Campbell; and The Apartment (as Mrs. Dreyfuss, the supportive "Jewish mother" type to Shirley MacLaine's character, Fran Kubelik). She portrayed Sgt. Bella Archer in the ABC crime drama Vega$ (1978). She made guest appearances on numerous television series. Her last role was on Days of Our Lives as Mrs. Nazareo in 1989. On old-time radio, Stevens portrayed Daphne Royce on Brenthouse and Irene Barbour on One Man's Family.

Stevens died on January 13, 2018, in Reseda, Los Angeles, California, aged 92.

== Partial filmography ==
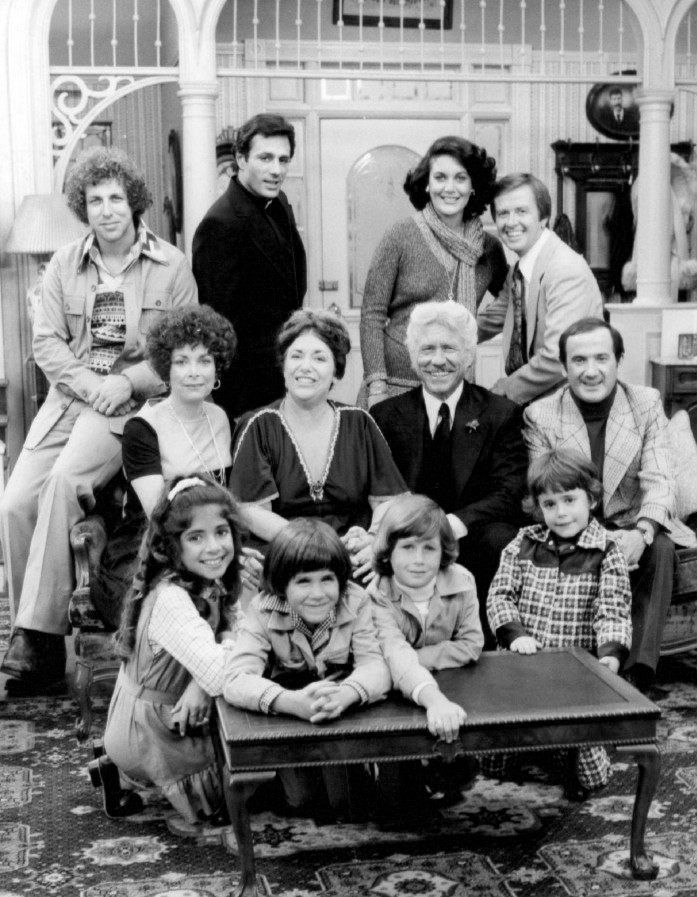
Cast of The Montefuscos (1975). Back row, L-R: Sal Viscuso, John Aprea, Linda Dano, Bill Cort. Middle row: Phoebe Dorin, Stevens, Joseph Sirola, Ron Carey. Front: Dominique Pinassi, Jeffrey Palladini, Damon Raskin and Robby Paris

- Have Gun - Will Travel (1957, TV Series) as Marga / Ma Kafka / Maria
- The Black Orchid (1958) as Guilia Gallo
- Rescue 8 (1959, TV Series) as Angela
- The Apartment (1960) as Mrs. Mildred Dreyfuss
- The Twilight Zone (1960, Episode: Mirror Image (The Twilight Zone)) as Washroom Attendant
- The Lawless Years (1961, TV Series) as Rose
- Perry Mason (1961–1964, TV Series) as Agnes / Fanny Werbler / Mrs. Kransdorf
- Dr. Kildare (1961–1965, TV Series) as Mrs. Gast / Aunt Kasia / Mrs. Mendoza / Mrs. Gitlin
- Convicts 4 (1962) as Resko's Mother
- McHale's Navy (1963, TV Series) as Mrs. Gruber
- The Farmer's Daughter (1964, TV series) as Mrs. Golden
- The Alfred Hitchcock Hour (1964, Episode: "The Gentleman Caller") as Mrs. Goldy
- Honeymoon Hotel (1964) as Woman at Garbage Dump (uncredited)
- Bob Hope Presents the Chrysler Theatre (1964, TV Series) as Aunt Clara / Maria Pia
- Joy in the Morning (1965) as Mrs. Ridinski (uncredited)
- The Art of Love (1965) as Mrs. Sarah Fromkis
- Frankie and Johnny (1966) as Princess Zolita (uncredited)
- Hogan's Heroes (1967, Episode: "The Crittendon Plan") as Nadya
- Valley of the Dolls (1967) as Miss Steinberg
- The Flying Nun (1967–1970, TV Series) as Sister Teresa / Mrs. Emanuel / Señora Rosales
- The Shakiest Gun in the West (1968) as Squaw (uncredited)
- To Die in Paris (1968, TV Movie) as Mama Dendier
- Buona Sera, Mrs. Campbell (1968) as Rosa
- The Doris Day Show (1968–1969, TV Series) as Juanita (housekeeper)
- My Three Sons (1969–1970, TV Series) as Mama Rossini
- Love, American Style (1969–1973, TV Series) as Hazel / Mildred / Rosa / Mrs. Straub aka Mother / Annie Ellsworth
- The Hawaiians (1970) as Queen Liliuokalani
- Room 222 (1970, TV Series) as Rose
- Fly Me (1973) as Toby's Mother
- Superdad (1973) as Mrs. Levin (neighbor)
- Hard Times (1975) as Madam
- The Montefuscos (1975, TV Series) as Rose Montefusco
- Hustle (1975) as Woman Hostage
- The Practice (1976, TV Series) as Mrs. Friedman
- Opening Night (1977) as Crying Mourner (uncredited)
- Vega$ (1978–1979, TV Series) as Sgt. Bella Archer
- The Triangle Factory Fire Scandal (1979, TV Movie) as Mrs. Goldstein
- Hotel (1982, TV Series) as Mrs. Tomasino
- Taxi (1983, TV Series) as Aunt Lucia
