= Sal Viscuso =

American actor (born 1948)

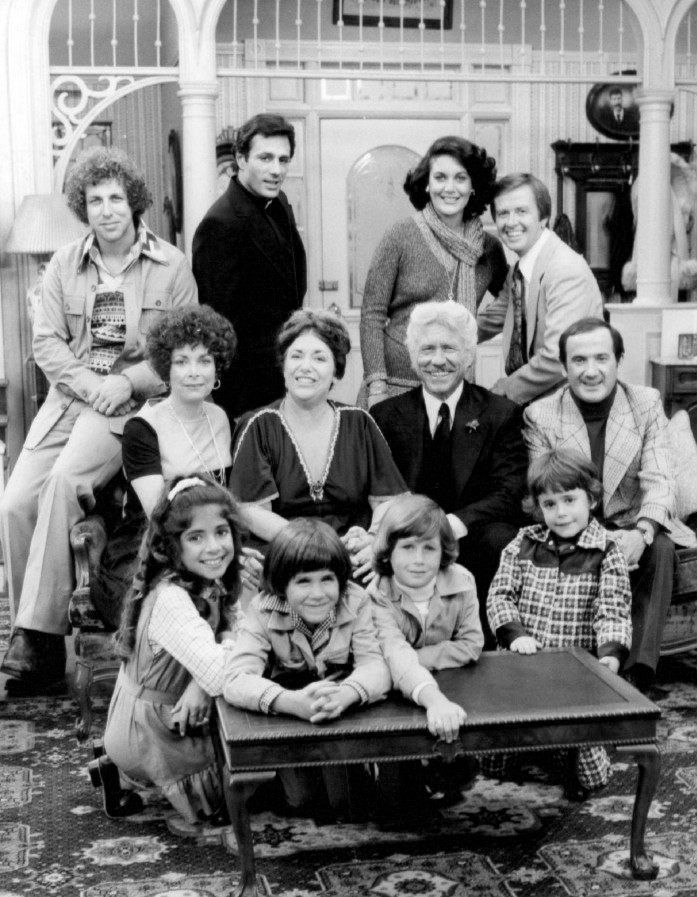
- Cast of The Montefuscos (1975) Back row, L-R: Sal Viscuso, John Aprea, Linda Dano, Bill Cort. Middle row: Phoebe Dorin, Naomi Stevens, Joseph Sirola, Ron Carey. Front: Dominique Pinassi, Jeffrey Palladini, Damon Raskin and Robby Paris
- Born: October 5, 1948 (age 77); Brooklyn, New York, U.S.
- Occupation: Actor
- Years active: 1974–present

Sal Viscuso (born October 5, 1948) is an American actor. He is best known for the role of Father Timothy Flotsky in Soap (1977–1981).

== Acting career ==
He is known for playing the character Father Timothy Flotsky, a Roman Catholic priest struggling with his vow of celibacy, on the television series Soap. He appeared in the movies “Max Dugan Returns” (1983 as ‘Coach Roy’), Spaceballs and The Taking of Pelham One Two Three. Viscuso appeared in four different roles on the sitcom Barney Miller. He has appeared in Diagnosis: Murder alongside Dick Van Dyke. He also played several weeks of the game show Pyramid with Dick Clark from 1977 to 1981.

Viscuso was one of two regular public address announcers in the series M*A*S*H. The more commonly heard voice was that of actor Todd Susman.

He played the recurring role of "Bobby Bigmouth" on the TV series, Lois & Clark: The New Adventures of Superman

== Education ==
Viscuso is a graduate of Hiram W. Johnson High School in Sacramento, California. At Johnson, he participated in student government. He attended University of California, Davis where he was active in theater.
