= Joseph Sirola =

American commercial, film, television, theatre actor and theatre producer

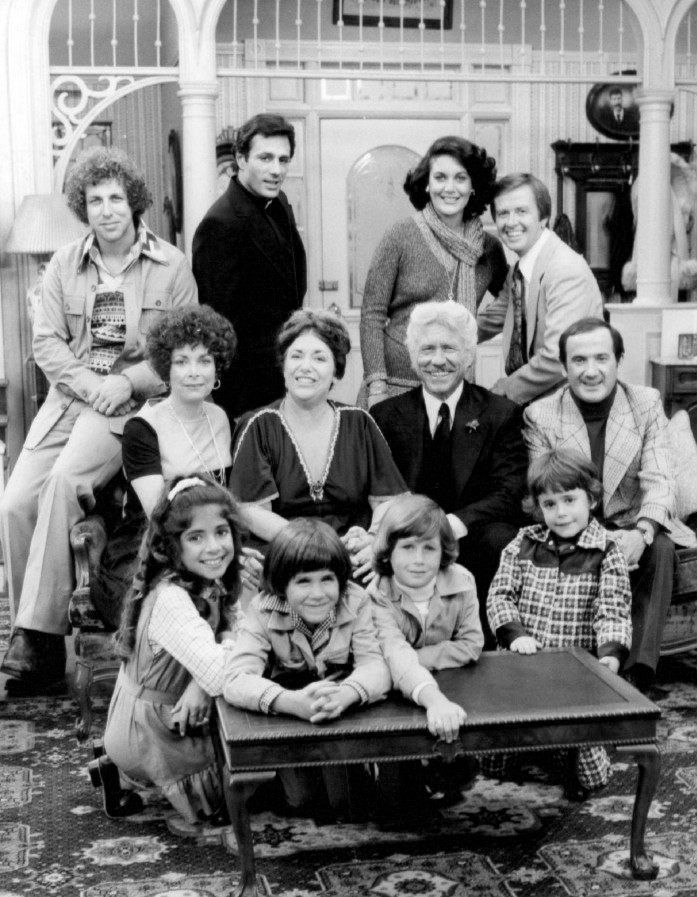
- Cast of The Montefuscos (1975). Sal Viscuso, John Aprea, Linda Dano, Bill Cort. Middle row: Phoebe Dorin, Naomi Stevens, Joseph Sirola, Ron Carey. Front: Dominique Pinassi, Jeffrey Palladini, Damon Raskin and Robby Paris.
- Born: Joseph Anthony Sirola; October 7, 1929; Carteret, New Jersey, U.S.
- Died: February 10, 2019 (aged 89); New York City, U.S.
- Education: Columbia University
- Occupations: Commercial, film, television, theatre actor and theatre producer
- Years active: 1959–2015

Joseph Anthony Sirola (October 7, 1929 – February 10, 2019) was an American commercial, film, television, theatre actor and theatre producer.

== Life and career ==
Sirola was born in Carteret, New Jersey to Croatian parents Anton, a carpenter and Ana (née Dubrovich), who ran a boardinghouse at 363 West 19th Street in Chelsea. He graduated from Stuyvesant High School in 1947 and earned a Bachelor of Science in Business from Columbia University in 1951. He then worked as a sales promotion manager at the multinational personal care corporation Kimberly-Clark, at the age of 28. He served in the U.S. Military for the Korean War before getting his career in acting.

Sirola began his acting career in 1959, appearing as Peter Nino in the television soap opera The Brighter Day. In 1960 he co-starred in the Broadway play, The Unsinkable Molly Brown. Sirola co-starred in another Broadway play, Golden Rainbow, in 1968. During the 1960s he also appeared in a few films and television programs including Gunsmoke, Hang 'Em High, The Andy Griffith Show, Chuka, Get Smart, The Man from U.N.C.L.E., Perry Mason, Strange Bedfellows and The Greatest Story Ever Told. His work on television commercials, for which he won over 20 Clio Awards, led to The Wall Street Journal nicknaming him “The King of the Voice-Overs” in 1970.

Over the next 30 years Sirola appeared and guest-starred in numerous film and television programs including Hawaii Five-O; The Super Cops; Mannix; Kolchak: The Night Stalker; Wonder Woman; Quincy, M.E.; Seizure; The Rockford Files; Spin City; Love, American Style; Charlie's Angels; Terrible Joe Moran; Diagnosis: Murder; The Ellen Burstyn Show and Washington: Behind Closed Doors. He was recurring in the short-lived TV series, The Magician, and he also starred in two short-lived television programs, The Montefuscos and Wolf. Sirola continued in voice-over work for television commercials including ads for Ford, Mobil, Wendy's and Nyquil.

In the 21st century Sirola began producing Broadway plays, including Time Stands Still, Stick Fly, The Trip to Bountiful, A Gentleman's Guide to Love & Murder and Love Letters. He also won and was nominated for Drama Desk Awards and Tony Awards. Sirola retired in 2015.

== Death ==
Sirola died on February 10, 2019, of complications from respiratory failure at a hospital in Manhattan, New York, at the age of 89.

== Filmography ==
Year	Title	Role	Notes
1959	Happy Anniversary	Waiter at El Morocco	Uncredited
1962	The Andy Griffith Show	Freddy Fleet	Episode: "The Mayberry Band"
1962	The Untouchables	Vincent Tunis	Episode: "The Economist"
1962-1965	Perry Mason	Dr. Raul Caudere/Bill Sheridan/George Hale	3 episodes
1963-1974	Gunsmoke	Leroy/Eddie	2 episodes
1964	Combat!	Casper	Episode: "The Eyes of the Hunter"
1964	Mr. Novak	Nelson	Episode: "Moonlighting"
1965	Ben Casey	Ned	Episode: "Every Other Minute, It's the End of the World"
1965	Strange Bedfellows	Petracini	
1965	The Greatest Story Ever Told	Dumah	Directed by George Stevens
1965	Death Valley Days	Stoney Carter/Pittser Chisum	2 episodes
1965-1966	Get Smart	Harvey Satan/Van Cleff	2 episodes
1966	The Green Hornet	Charley	Episode: "Give 'Em Enough Rope"
1966	Run for Your Life	Vilovic	Episode: "The Borders of Barbarism"
1966	Mission: Impossible	Suverin	Episode: "The Short Tail Spy"
1966-1967	The Man from U.N.C.L.E.	General Paco Abaca/Malanez/Malik	3 episodes
1967	Chuka	Jake Baldwin	
1968	Hang 'Em High	Reno, Cooper Hanging Party	
1969	Three		
1970-1973	Hawaii Five-O	Jonathan Kay	5 episodes
1970	The Delta Factor	Sal Dekker	Based on novel by Mickey Spillane
1972	Hail	Rev. Jimmy Williams	
1973	Cry Rape	Detective Sloane	ABC Movie of the Week
1973	Love, American Style	Alvin	segment: "Love and the Cryin' Cowboy"
1973-1976	Somerset	Rudy Aloriz/Fred Harrington	753 episodes
1974	The Magician	Dominick	11 episodes
1974	The Super Cops	Police Lt. O'Shaughnessy	
1974	Kolchak: The Night Stalker	Benjamin Sposato	Episode: "The Zombie"
1974	Rhoda	Charlie Curran	Episode: "Guess What I Got You for the Holidays"
1974	Seizure	Charlie Hughes	Feature film directorial debut of Oliver Stone
1975	Mannix	Harry Elliott	Episode: "A Word Called Courage"
1975	The Montefuscos	Tony "Papa" Montefusco	Main cast - 9 episodes
1977	Washington: Behind Closed Doors	Ozymandias	Minseries - 2 episodes
1977	Meeting of Minds	Thomas Paine	2 episodes
1979	Wonder Woman	Harrison Fynch	2 episodes
1979-1980	The Rockford Files	Henry Gersh/Joseph Minette	2 episodes
1979-1982	Quincy, M.E.	Lt. Sal Drasso	5 episodes
1980	Swan Song	Adolfo	TV film directed by Jerry London
1981	Charlie's Angels	Boris	Episode: "Angel on a Roll"
1982	Bret Maverick	Nimrod Bligh	Episode: "The Not So Magnificent Six"
1984	Matt Houston	Uncle Phil	Episode: "Cash and Carry"
1984	Riptide	Sam Valentine	Episode: "Long Distance Daddy"
1985	The A-Team	Nathan Vincent	Episode: "The Big Squeeze"
1986	The Ellen Burstyn Show	Phillip	Episode: "Sydney's Night Out"
1986-1988	Simon & Simon	Matthew Haskell/Mobster	2 episodes
1987	Ohara	Judge Locke	Episode: "Artful Dodgers"
1989	Gideon Oliver	Grecco	Episode: "Tongs"
1989-1990	Wolf	Sal Wolf	Main cast - 11 episodes
1991	DEA	Visiglia	Episode: "White Lies"
1992	Civil Wars	Judge Enzo Beltratti	Episode: "Mob Psychology"
1992-1995	Silk Stalkings	Tony Morella/Judge Bill Cafferty	2 episodes
1994	Love Is a Gun	Al Kinder	
1996-1997	The City	Gino Soleito #2	Main cast - 70 episodes
1997	Sunday	Joe Subalowsky	
1999	Spin City	Mario Forcini	Episode: "The Mayor with Two Brains"
1999	NYPD Blue	Rooster Rawlins	Episode: "T'aint Misbehavin"
2001	Diagnosis: Murder	Ted Barkley	2 episodes
2010	Rescue Me	Norman	Episode: "Cowboy"
