= Rae Cummings =

- One Life to Live character
- Commercial bumper of Linda Dano as Rae Cummings
- Portrayed by: Linda Dano
- Duration: 1978–1980; 1999–2004
- First appearance: 1978
- Last appearance: March 12, 2004
- Created by: Gordon Russell
- Introduced by: Joseph Stuart (1978); Jill Farren Phelps (One Life to Live, 1999); Jean Dadario Burke (All My Children, 1999); Julie Hanan Carruthers (Port Charles, 2000); Jill Farren Phelps (General Hospital, 2003)
- Crossover appearances: All My Children; General Hospital; Port Charles
In-universe information
- Occupation: Psychologist; Newspaper columnist; Radio talk show host; Professor, Llanview University; Profiler, Llanview Police Department; Marriage counselor
- Parents: Marcello Angelini; Myrtle Fargate
- Adoptive mother: Sarah Washburn
- Spouse: Karl Schweikart(1972–1977); Daniel Faulkner (1981–2000); Asa Buchanan (2002–2003)
- Daughters: Skye Chandler
- Granddaughters: Lila Rae Alcazar
- Aunts and uncles: Claudia Connor; Clive Cummings (adoptive); Clarisse Cummings (adoptive)
- First cousins: Ceara Connor; George Connor, Jr.; Kevin Connor; Patrick Connor; Susan Connor; Linda Connor; Rebecca Connor; John Connor

Rae Cummings is a fictional character on the ABC daytime soap operas One Life to Live and All My Children Linda Dano played the role from 1978 to 1980, from June 28 to November 1999, and from May 2000 to March 12, 2004.

== Casting and awards ==
Gretel Rae Cummings was originated by Linda Dano from 1978 to 1980. Dano went on to appear on CBS's As the World Turns and on NBC's Another World until that series' cancellation on June 25, 1999. On June 28, 1999, Dano returned to One Life to Live as Rae. Anna Stuart filled in for Dano on April 25, 2002. Dano was nominated for a Daytime Emmy for Supporting Actress in 2003, and left One Life to Live on March 13, 2004.

After playing Felicia Gallant on Another World, Dano was not looking forward to playing a character named Gretel, which she felt sounded less glamorous. She and the producers of One Life to Live reached a compromise where Gretel would now be using her middle name, Rae. It was later revealed on One Life to Live that Gretel had stolen the credentials of a man named Ray Cummings, and had been practicing psychology without a valid license.

== ABC crossovers ==
In a move designed to "entice viewers to tune into soap operas that they might not have usually watched," in 2000, then-president of ABC Daytime Angela Shapiro orchestrated Dano's concurrent appearance as Rae Cummings on the three other ABC daytime dramas at the time — All My Children, General Hospital, and Port Charles — in an extended crossover storyline, which was the first time a daytime character had appeared on four series.
