= Eugene Twombly =

American film special effects director

- Publicity Photo of Eugene Twombly
- Born: Eugene Tracy Twombly; April 27, 1914; California, U.S.
- Died: October 17, 1968 (aged 54); Los Angeles, California, U.S.
- Other name: Gene Twombly
- Occupation: Sound effects technician
- Years active: 1950s–1968
- Spouse: Bea Benaderet (m. 1957; died 1968)

Eugene Tracy Twombly (April 27, 1914 – October 17, 1968) was a sound effects technician in radio and motion pictures.

== Early life ==
Eugene Twombly was born in California in 1914 to Ralph H. and Marie L. Twombly (née Tracy; 1892–1958). He was the eldest of two children with a younger brother, Ralph Jr. (born 1922), and of partial Canadian ancestry from his paternal grandmother.

== Career ==
He is best known for his sound work on The Jack Benny Program, where his wife, actress Bea Benaderet, played telephone operator Gertrude Gearshift. Other works included Arch Oboler's Lights Out, The Stan Freberg Show, The Gene Autry Show, The Whistler, and When the West Was Young, and a collaboration with Bill Cosby and Frank Buxton on The Bill Cosby Radio Program, which aired 145 episodes from January to July 1968.

The Jack Benny Program included occasional references to "Twombly, the sound-effects man," and Mel Blanc voiced a character called "George Twombly" who often interrupted Benny and his cast with impromptu sound effects. In the 1962 first season of The Beverly Hillbillies (where Benaderet had a recurring role as Cousin Pearl Bodine), two consecutive episodes, "The Clampetts Get Psychoanalyzed" and "The Psychiatrist Gets Clampetted," featured a psychiatrist named "Dr. Eugene Twombly" who was played by Herbert Rudley.

== Personal life and death ==
Gene Twombly was Bea Benaderet's second husband and the stepfather of actor Jack Bannon, and they resided in Calabasas, California. He died of a heart attack at age 54 on October 17, 1968, four days after her death from pneumonia and lung cancer and one day after her funeral. They are interred together at Valhalla Memorial Park Cemetery in North Hollywood.
