= Bea Benaderet =

American actress (1906–1968)

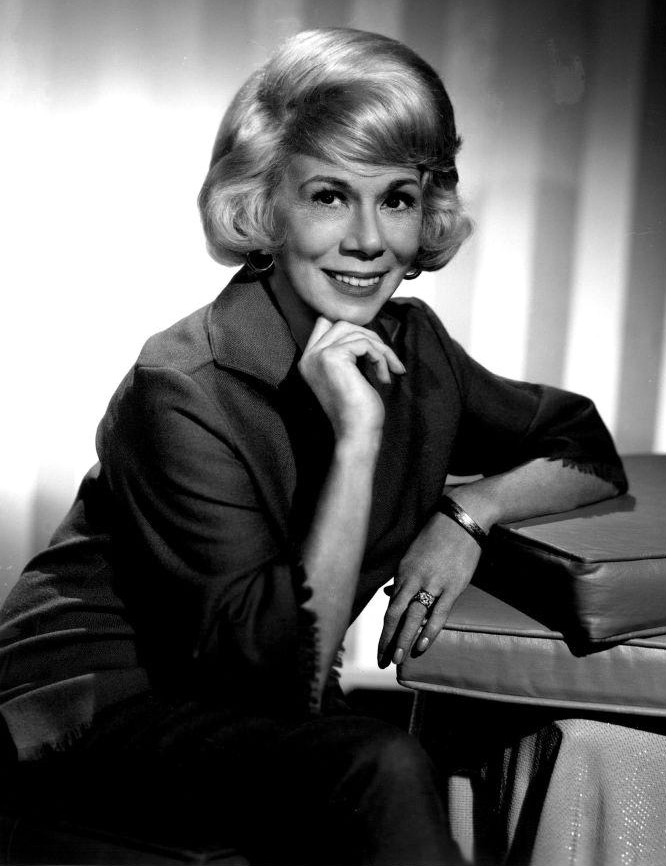
- 1966 publicity photo
- Born: Beatrice Benaderet; April 4, 1906; New York City, U.S.
- Died: October 13, 1968 (aged 62); Los Angeles, California, U.S.
- Resting place: Valhalla Memorial Park Cemetery, North Hollywood, Los Angeles
- Occupations: Actress; comedienne
- Years active: 1917–1968
- Spouses: Jim Bannon (m. 1938; div. 1950) Eugene Twombly (m. 1958)
- Children: 2, including Jack Bannon

Beatrice Benaderet (/ˌbɛnəˈdɛrət/ BEN-ə-DERR-ət; April 4, 1906 – October 13, 1968) was an American actress and comedienne. Born in New York City and raised in San Francisco, she began performing in Bay Area theatre and radio before embarking on a Hollywood career that spanned over three decades. Benaderet first specialized in voice-over work in the golden age of radio, appearing on numerous programs while working with comedians of the era such as Jack Benny, Burns and Allen, and Lucille Ball. Her expertise in dialect and characterization led to her becoming Warner Bros.' leading voice of female characters in their animated cartoons of the early 1940s through the mid-1950s.

Benaderet was then a prominent figure on television in situation comedies, first with The George Burns and Gracie Allen Show from 1950 to 1958, for which she earned two Emmy Award nominations for Best Supporting Actress. In the 1960s, she had regular roles in four series until her death from lung cancer in 1968, including the commercial successes The Beverly Hillbillies, The Flintstones, and her best-known role as Kate Bradley in Petticoat Junction. She has a star on the Hollywood Walk of Fame honoring her work in television.

== Early life ==
Beatrice Benaderet was born on April 4, 1906 (Note: Birth year varied in census records.) in New York City. Her mother Margaret (née O'Keefe) was Irish American, and her father, Samuel David Benaderet, a Sephardic Jewish emigrant from what is now Turkey, was a tobacconist who relocated the family from New York City to San Francisco in 1915 after his participation in the Panama–Pacific International Exposition. The same year, he opened a smoke shop that operated for 65 years, making it the oldest such retailer in California at the time of its closure in 1980.

Benaderet was raised in her mother's Catholic faith and attended grade school at a Dominican convent. She studied voice and the piano; her first acting performance came at 11 when she portrayed a bearded old man in a school play.

The following year, her participation in a children's production of The Beggar's Opera resulted in a local radio station manager inviting her to a one-time performance on one of his programs, for which she was paid $10. Benaderet made her professional theatre debut at 16 in a production of The Prince of Pilsen, and, after graduating from the Academy of St. Rose, a private, all-girls' high school, she attended the Reginald Travers School of Acting and joined his stock company The Players' Guild, appearing in stage productions of works such as Polly, Lysistrata, and Uncle Tom's Cabin.

== Career ==
=== Radio ===
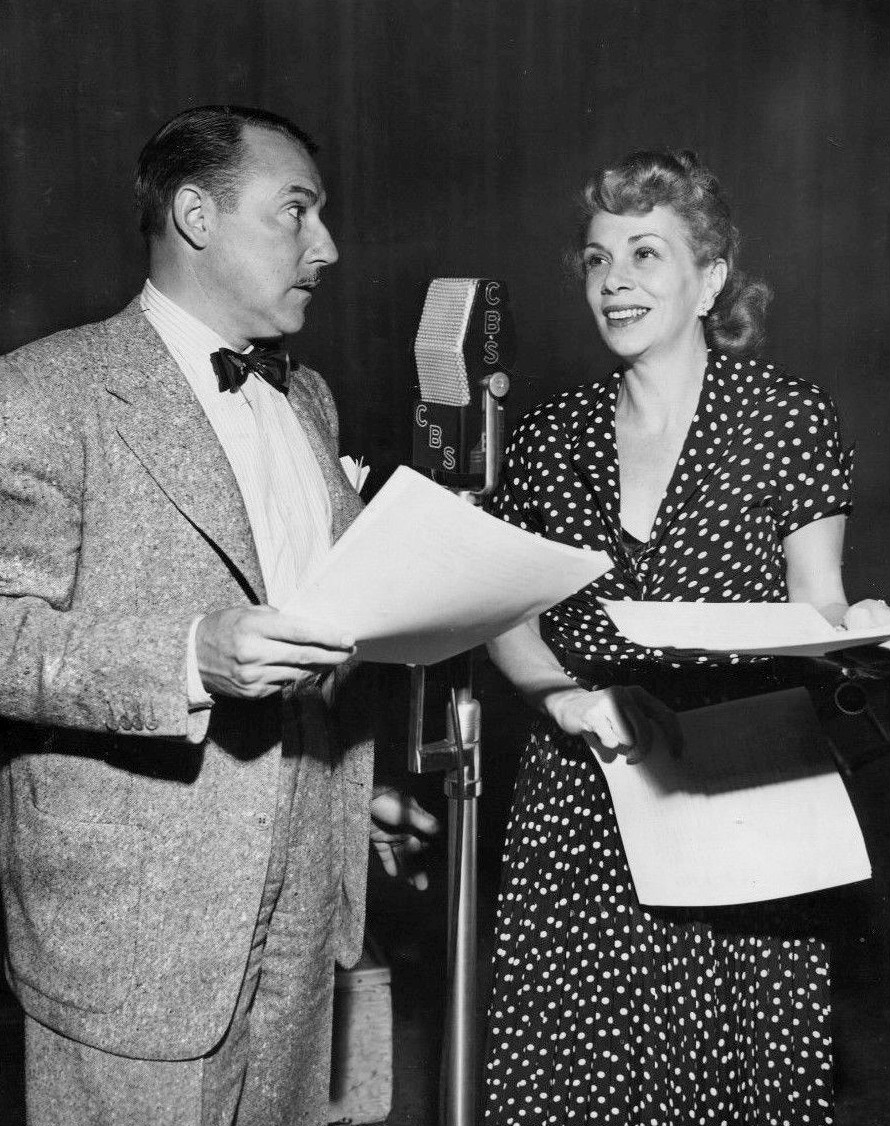
Benaderet and Gale Gordon on Granby's Green Acres in 1950

In 1926, Benaderet joined the staff of San Francisco radio station KFRC, which was under the new ownership of Don Lee and where her duties included acting, singing, writing, and producing.

Initially seeking work as a dramatic actress, she switched to comedy and performed on multiple programs, in particular the Blue Monday Jamboree variety show, where her castmates included Meredith Willson, Elvia Allman, and future I Love Lucy producer Jess Oppenheimer. Benaderet honed a variety of dialects such as French, Spanish, New York City English, and Yiddish, the latter from voicing a character named "Rheba Haufawitz". She additionally hosted the musical variety show Salon Moderne and gained attention for her work as a female announcer, a rarity in 1930s radio.

Benaderet relocated to Hollywood in 1936 and joined radio station KHJ, making her network radio debut with Orson Welles for his Mercury Theatre repertory company heard on The Campbell Playhouse. The following year she received her first big break in the industry on The Jack Benny Program, where she played Gertrude Gearshift, a wisecracking telephone operator who gossiped about Jack Benny with her cohort Mabel Flapsaddle (Sara Berner). Intended as a one-time appearance, the pair became a recurring role starting in the 1945–46 season, and in early 1947, Benaderet and Berner momentarily took over the NBC switchboards in Hollywood for publicity photos. She performed in as many as five shows daily, causing her rehearsal dates to conflict with those of The Jack Benny Program and resulting in her reading live as Gertrude from a marked script she was handed upon entering the studio.

Other recurring characters Benaderet portrayed were Blanche Morton on The George Burns and Gracie Allen Show; school principal Eve Goodwin on The Great Gildersleeve; Millicent Carstairs on Fibber McGee & Molly; maid Gloria on The Adventures of Ozzie and Harriet; and Iris Atterbury on the Lucille Ball vehicle My Favorite Husband, opposite Gale Gordon. Benaderet voiced various one-time parts before joining the main cast as Iris, neighbor and friend of Ball's character Liz Cooper. The 1950 CBS program Granby's Green Acres, a perceived spinoff of My Favorite Husband, was her one radio lead role and reunited her with Gordon as a husband and wife who abandon city life to become farmers, but it lasted only eight episodes.

=== Voice acting ===
Beginning in 1943, Benaderet became Warner Bros.' primary voice of adult female supporting characters for their Merrie Melodies and Looney Tunes animated shorts, initially sharing duties with Sara Berner. Her characterizations included an obnoxious teenaged bobbysox version of Little Red Riding Hood in Little Red Riding Rabbit (1944); Witch Hazel in Bewitched Bunny (1954); the spinster hen Miss Prissy in several Foghorn Leghorn cartoons; Tweety's owner "Granny" including the Academy Award-winning Tweetie Pie (1947); and Mama Bear in a series of Three Bears shorts, which animator Chuck Jones called one of his favorite portrayals. Benaderet did not receive onscreen credit for her work because she was employed by Warner Bros. as a freelance actor (Note: Her occupation is listed as such in the 1940 U.S. census.) who voiced peripheral characters, and unlike Mel Blanc, was not under contract with the studio. In 1955, she was succeeded by June Foray as Warner's premier female voice artist.

=== Television ===
Benaderet was Lucille Ball's first choice as Ethel Mertz for the sitcom I Love Lucy; Ball said in a 1984 interview that she had "no other picture of anyone" for the role. However, Benaderet had to turn down the offer since she was contracted to the television adaptation of The George Burns and Gracie Allen Show, so Vivian Vance was eventually cast. Benaderet guest-starred on the January 21, 1952, first-season episode "Lucy Plays Cupid" as the character of Miss Lewis, a love-starved spinster neighbor.

Benaderet continued her Burns & Allen radio role of the Burns' neighbor Blanche Morton, Gracie's friend and staunchest supporter in her escapades. She was the only secondary cast member who appeared in every episode and the first six shows were shot live in New York, resulting in Benaderet commuting to Los Angeles, where she was working several radio assignments at the time.

Blanche Morton's long-suffering husband, Harry, was played by four actors over the show's eight-year run; the last, Larry Keating, was introduced on the October 5, 1953, fourth-season premiere when George Burns entered the set and halted a scene of an angered Blanche preparing to hit Harry with a book. Burns introduced Keating to Benaderet and the audience, and she broke character to exchange pleasantries with Keating. The segment then resumed and Benaderet struck Keating with the book. Benaderet and Gracie Allen regularly shopped for their own on-set wardrobe and she developed a high-pitched laugh for Blanche that became a staple of the character and was used for comic effect: "When we had a scene with some silent spots in it, George would say to me, 'Laugh there, Bea.'" Benaderet garnered two Primetime Emmy Award nominations for Outstanding Supporting Actress in a Comedy Series in 1954 and 1955. Following Allen's retirement in 1958 at the end of the eighth season, the program continued as The George Burns Show in 1958–59 with Blanche repackaged as George's secretary, but it was canceled after one season due to low ratings. Benaderet worked sparsely in 1959, filming one-time appearances on General Electric Theater and The Restless Gun.

Benaderet became a fixture on television in the 1960s, which included working on two shows simultaneously from 1960 to 1964. She played housekeeper Wilma in the lone season of the 1960 sitcom Peter Loves Mary, a part she received because of references from Burns. Benaderet considered herself "lucky" to be cast in another series out of fear that she had become too closely associated with Burns & Allen. The same year, she was then cast as the voice of Betty Rubble in the Hanna-Barbera primetime animated series The Flintstones. Benaderet auditioned with past radio coworker Jean Vander Pyl for Betty and Wilma Flintstone by exchanging dialogue before the show's co-creator Joseph Barbera, who asked afterward what part they preferred. Vander Pyl recalled in 1994: "I said, 'Oh, I want to be Wilma!' [and] Bea said, 'That's fine with me.'" Benaderet voiced guest spots on the side for fellow Hanna-Barbera productions Top Cat and The Yogi Bear Show during 1961 and 1962. While filming the debut season of her show Petticoat Junction the next year, she continued voicing Betty by recording her part alone or with her Flintstones castmates during evening hours until scheduling conflicts forced her to drop the role at the end of the fourth season in 1964. She was replaced by Gerry Johnson.

==== Collaboration with Paul Henning ====
In the late 1940s, Benaderet befriended Paul Henning, a scriptwriter on the radio production of Burns & Allen. She appeared on the 19 episodes of the show he had written between 1947 and 1951. She became one of his regular players in the first two seasons of Burns & Allen, a two-episode guest appearance on The Bob Cummings Show in 1956–57, and her involvement in three of the most successful sitcoms of the 1960s. After reading the 1961 first script for The Beverly Hillbillies, Benaderet wanted to audition for the role of Granny. Despite considering her to be too buxom for his vision of the character as a small and wiry woman, Henning allowed her to test anyway. Irene Ryan ultimately won the role; according to Henning, "Bea took one look at the way Irene did the part and said to me, 'There's your Granny!'" He additionally took Benaderet's suggestion of casting Harriet MacGibbon as Granny's rival Margaret Drysdale. Henning created for Benaderet the supporting character of Cousin Pearl Bodine, the middle-aged widowed mother of Jethro Bodine (Max Baer Jr.) and cousin of main character Jed Clampett (Buddy Ebsen), whom she convinces to move from his humble home in the Ozarks after he strikes oil on his property and becomes a millionaire. Prior to shooting the pilot, Benaderet enlisted a dialect coach to help her learn a hillbilly accent. Impressed with her performance while screening the pilot to potential sponsors, Henning made Cousin Pearl a recurring character in the 1962–63 first season as she moved into the Clampetts' Beverly Hills mansion, feuded with Granny, and pursued oil tycoon Mr. Brewster (Frank Wilcox) as a love interest. Bluegrass duo Flatt and Scruggs, who performed the show's opening theme, recorded a comedic serenade in 1963 titled "Pearl Pearl Pearl" and Benaderet was pictured on the single's cover. Benaderet described Pearl's curly hair as "just my mental image of the character. ... Pearl played the piano for the silent movies and she saw such high fashion and ridiculous hairdos. She could read and write, and the curled hair seemed to Pearl the height of smartness." (Note: In the 15th episode of the first season, "Jed Rescues Pearl" (aired January 2, 1963), Pearl plays the piano during a screening of the 1925 Rudolph Valentino film The Eagle.)

Henning had long admired Benaderet's talents and strove to create a starring vehicle for her, as he felt she was worthy of headlining her own series after years of supporting parts. When CBS granted him an open time slot after the massive success of Beverly Hillbillies, he crafted the 1963 rural sitcom Petticoat Junction around Benaderet, starring as Kate Bradley, the widowed proprietor of the Shady Rest Hotel. Cousin Pearl was consequently written out of the Beverly Hillbillies storyline as having moved back home. (Note: Benaderet made one final appearance as Pearl in the October 11, 1967, fifth-season episode "Greetings From the President".) The character of Kate represented Benaderet's first straight role: "Kate Bradley is different from the characters I've played in the past. She has to walk a fine line between being humorous and tender. The other women I've played were strictly for laughs." Benaderet and director Richard Whorf auditioned the young actresses who would play Kate's three teenaged daughters; she persuaded Henning to let his 18-year-old daughter Linda read (successfully) for the role of Betty Jo Bradley. Linda Henning and Benaderet's son, Jack Bannon, were members of a young actors' theater group at the time. CBS promoted the show's September 22, 1963, premiere with a print ad featuring an Al Hirschfeld caricature of Benaderet as Cousin Pearl. Petticoat Junction was an immediate hit, peaking at fourth in the Nielsen ratings, and remained in the top 30 during Benaderet's four full seasons on the show from 1963 to 1967. Her former Flintstones costars Alan Reed and Jean Vander Pyl filmed guest spots in later seasons.

Henning was again given free rein for a new show with no pilot needed, which he bestowed to colleague Jay Sommers due to his busy schedule. Sommers created the 1965 sitcom Green Acres, adapted from his 1950 radio program Granby's Green Acres that had starred Benaderet, thus making it a spinoff of her own television show. Benaderet filmed six appearances as Kate in the first season as both shows' casts intermingled on several episodes in a process dubbed "cross-pollination".

=== Film and other works ===
Benaderet played bit parts in six motion pictures from 1946 to 1962, four of which were uncredited. She was chosen from 200 actresses for the part of a government file clerk in Alfred Hitchcock's Notorious (1946) and completed filming in half an hour, but her scenes were cut from the final print. She told Radio Life magazine that year that after having struggled to remember her lines, "Mr. Hitchcock looked me right in the eye and asked 'You want to go back to radio?' I said yes". Her first onscreen appearance, also uncredited, was in the film On the Town (1949), as one of two women whom the main characters (played by Gene Kelly and Frank Sinatra) encounter while riding the subway.

In 1945, Benaderet and fellow voice actresses Janet Waldo and Cathy Lewis were to appear on a televised fashion show on her former KFRC employer Don Lee's pioneer Los Angeles television station W6XAO (now KCBS-TV) before the project fell through. On Irving Taylor's novelty album Drink Along with Irving (1960), she duetted with Elvia Allman and Mel Blanc, respectively, on tracks titled "Sub-Bourbon Living" and "Separate Bar Stools".

== Personal life ==
Benaderet and her first husband, actor Jim Bannon, met while employed at KHJ in Los Angeles. They married in August 1938 and had two children: Jack (1940–2017), and Maggie (b. 1947). However, Bannon's heavy filming and touring schedule required for his portrayal of fictional cowboy hero Red Ryder took a toll on their marriage and she filed for divorce in September 1950. In 1958, Benaderet married Eugene Twombly, a sound-effects technician eight years her junior for movies and television who had worked on The Jack Benny Program, and they remained together until her death in 1968. Twombly died four days later. Her son Jack became an actor, making his television debut in bit parts on Petticoat Junction (and working on the show as a dialogue coach), later appearing in Lou Grant.

In 1961, Benaderet dressed in a Flintstones-inspired leopard-print costume to collect donations for City of Hope and March of Dimes and worked with Welcome Wagon in the San Fernando Valley. On February 5, 1964, she was named an honorary sheriff of Calabasas, California, with her daughter Maggie accepting a badge on her behalf that was presented by her Petticoat Junction co-star Edgar Buchanan in a public ceremony.

== Illness and death ==
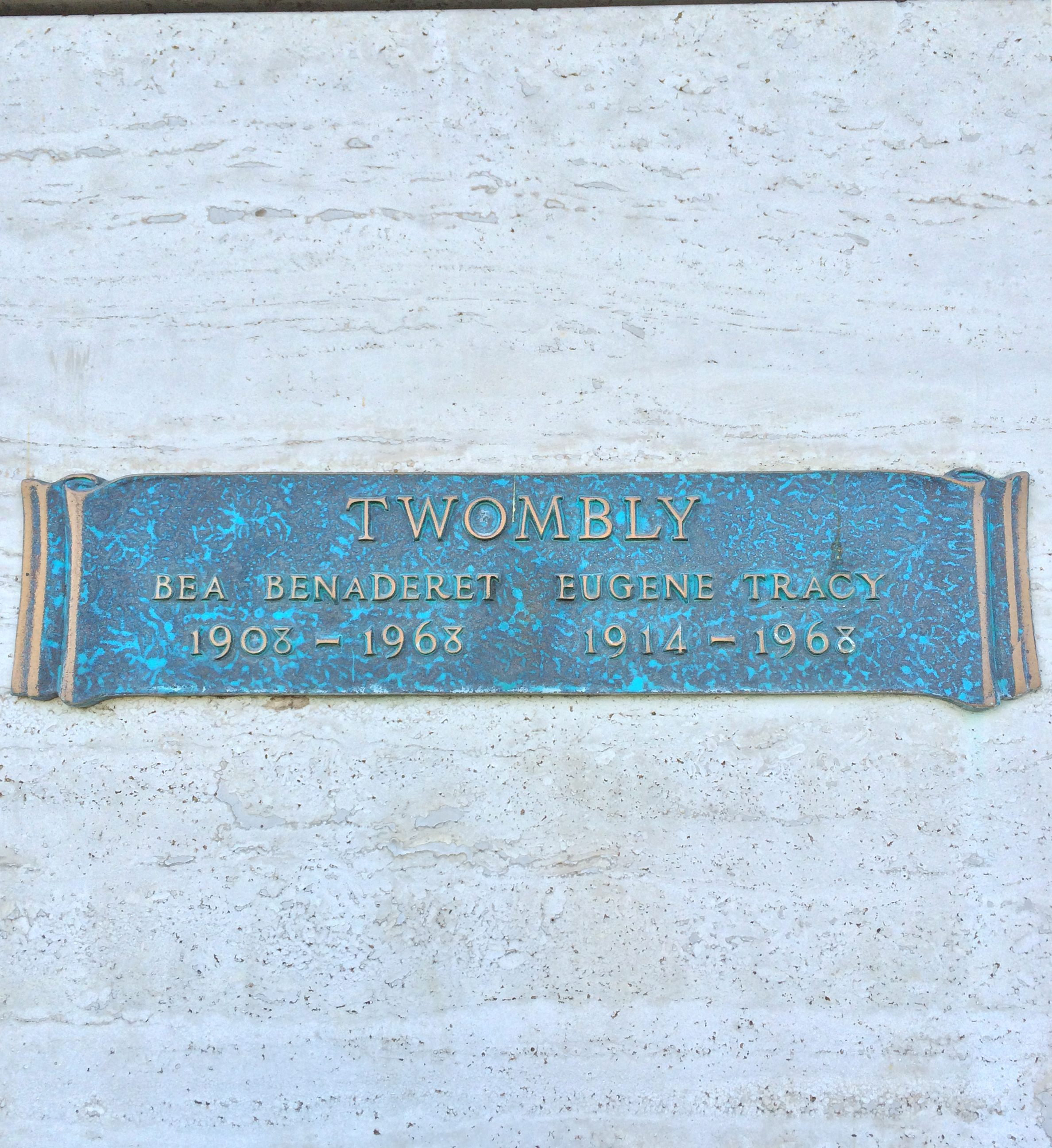
Bea Benaderet's crypt at Valhalla Memorial Park, with incorrect year of birth

During a routine checkup in 1963, a spot was discovered on one of Benaderet's lungs. It was no longer visible at the time of her follow-up visit, but by November 1967, it had returned and grown in size. She resisted immediate exploratory surgery, as she was filming the fifth season of Petticoat Junction and feared the show would be affected by her absence. On November 26, she underwent the surgery at Good Samaritan Hospital in Los Angeles, when it was discovered the tumor could not be removed. Diagnosed with lung cancer, Benaderet underwent six weeks of radiation treatment via a linear particle accelerator at Stanford University Medical Center. A longtime smoker, she cut down her multiple-pack-a-day habit following her initial checkups and quit entirely after her surgery.

Benaderet's treatment was initially successful and concluded in January 1968. She had missed 10 episodes of the show as she recuperated, during which her character of Kate Bradley was vaguely described in the storyline as being out of town. Expectations were that Benaderet would eventually recover and be able to resume filming. Rosemary DeCamp (Kate's sister Helen) and Shirley Mitchell (Kate's cousin Mae Jennings) filled in as temporary mother figures during her absence; Mitchell had previously worked with Benaderet on The Jack Benny Program in 1954–55 as Mabel Flapsaddle. Benaderet returned for the March 30 fifth-season finale "Kate's Homecoming", but five months later, after shooting the first three episodes of the sixth season, she took leave from the series due to being too ill to continue. Initial plans were for her to record her voice to be inserted into future episodes. However, her condition dramatically declined; on September 26, chest pains related to her illness forced her to return to the hospital for the final time. The fourth show of the sixth season, "The Valley Has a Baby", marked Benaderet's last episode and featured only her voice with her stand-in filmed from the rear.

Benaderet died on October 13, 1968, of lung cancer and pneumonia, at Good Samaritan Hospital in Los Angeles. She is entombed in Valhalla Memorial Park Cemetery in North Hollywood. On October 17, four days after her death and the day after her funeral, her husband Eugene Twombly died at the age of 54 from a massive heart attack and is interred beside her.

== Acting style and reception ==
"I think it is the most wonderful profession in the world. I can walk on the set in the morning not thinking I can put one foot in front of the other, and then on stage, something happens. You come to life right away. I would die if I didn't work."

— Benaderet in 1965 on her love of acting.

When Benaderet was cast in Petticoat Junction, she was hailed as having "finally" become a star. She had previously played supporting roles throughout her career, usually as a next-door neighbor, and had been openly averse to leading roles. However, in January 1963, following CBS's acquisition of Petticoat Junction, she enthused to columnist Eve Starr of The Mercury: "Isn't it nice? After all these years. ... [It] just never occurred to me that it might...golly, my own show!" Benaderet often discussed facets of the acting profession in promotional interviews for the show, and believed that leading a series required a "feeling of responsibility", including her being more observant of on-set activity and her costars' performances, while continuously evolving her character.

Benaderet garnered praise for her mastery of dialects and her work as a comedienne and character actress, while she is recognized for her voice characterizations in animation. MeTV considered her an "icon" of 1960s television. Donna Douglas said, "Watching her timing is like watching a ballerina. She's so effortless." Benaderet credited George Burns with mentoring her in comedy acting, but claimed that television scriptwriters focused more on her voice and delivery than her characters, which she believed stunted opportunities for her to play more dramatic roles. For her contributions to television, Benaderet received a star on the Hollywood Walk of Fame in 1960, on 1611 Vine Street, and she was the recipient of a Genii Award in 1966.

She is credited with over 1000 combined radio and television episode appearances, which earned her the nickname of "Busy Bea" from members of the press. The Pantagraph columnist Ernie Kreiling remarked in 1965 that "probably no Hollywood personality has spent as many hours in our homes". Benaderet was good friends and a frequent collaborator with Mel Blanc, who wrote in his 1988 biography That's Not All Folks!: "[We] spent so much time together in studios that I used to refer jokingly to her as the 'other woman' in my life."

Keeping the spelling of her surname, which has been misspelled as Benederet or Benadaret, was a choice she insisted on. She first resisted requests to change it early in her radio career: "[T]hey'd say, 'Anything's better than Benaderet—How about Smith?'" When she was introduced to Orson Welles in 1936, he remarked that her name "sounded like something you ad lib in a mob scene." It was misspelled in a 1946 press release created specifically about its proper spelling, and Radio Life wrote in 1947: "If someone were to conduct a survey to decide the radio personality with the most frequently misspelled name, Bea Benaderet would probably win hands down." Early in the first season of The George Burns and Gracie Allen Show, her full name appeared as "Bee Benadaret" in the closing credits.

== See also ==
- List of comedians
- List of stars on the Hollywood Walk of Fame

== Selected filmography ==
=== Radio ===
(Note: Click on archived link for complete listing.)

- Blue Monday Jamboree (1927–1936)
- The Jack Benny Program (1937–1955)
- Fibber McGee and Molly (1939–1951)
- The Campbell Playhouse (1939–1940)
- Lux Radio Theatre (1940–1944)
- The George Burns and Gracie Allen Show (1942–1949)
- Cavalcade of America (1942–1944)
- A Date with Judy (1942)
- Mayor of the Town (1942)
- Lights Out (1943)
- Command Performance (1943–1946)
- Suspense (1943–1944)
- The Great Gildersleeve (1943–1949)
- The Red Skelton Program (1944)
- The Adventures of Ozzie and Harriet (1944–1945)
- The Adventures of Maisie (1945–1952)
- This is Your FBI (1945–1953)
- The Mel Blanc Show (1946–1947)
- A Day in the Life of Dennis Day (1946–1951)
- The Lum and Abner Show (1948)
- Hallmark Playhouse (1948–1951)
- My Favorite Husband (1948–1951)
- Granby's Green Acres (1950)
- The Penny Singleton Show (1950)
- Broadway Is My Beat (1950–1951)
- The Halls of Ivy (1950–1952)
- Hollywood Star Playhouse (1951)
- Meet Millie (1951–1954)

=== Shorts ===
- Little Red Riding Rabbit (1944) (voice)
- Bugs Bunny and the Three Bears (1944) (voice)
- Baseball Bugs (1946) (voice)
- Tweetie Pie (1947) (voice)
- Chow Hound (1951) (voice)
- A Bear for Punishment (1951) (voice)
- Gift Wrapped (1952) (voice)
- Feed the Kitty (1952) (voice)
- Bewitched Bunny (1954) (voice)
- The Hole Idea (1955) (voice)

=== Film ===
Year	Title	Role	Notes
1946	Notorious	File Clerk	Uncredited
1949	On the Town	Brooklyn Girl on Subway	Uncredited
1952	The First Time	Mrs. Potter	Uncredited
1954	Black Widow	Mrs. Franklin Walsh	Uncredited
1959	Plunderers of Painted Flats	Ella Heather	
1962	Tender Is the Night	Mrs. McKisco	

=== Television ===
Year	Title	Role	Notes
1950–1958	The George Burns and Gracie Allen Show	Blanche Morton	291 episodes Nominated—Primetime Emmy Award for Outstanding Supporting Actress in a Comedy Series (1954, 1955)
1952	I Love Lucy	Miss Lewis	Episode: "Lucy Plays Cupid"
1952–1955	The Jack Benny Program	Gertrude Gearshift	7 episodes Continuation of radio role
1955	The Lineup		Episode: "The Falling Out of Thieves"
1956–1957	The Bob Cummings Show	Blanche Morton/Dixie	2 episodes
1958–1959	The George Burns Show	Blanche Morton	25 episodes
1959	General Electric Theater	Marie	Episode: "Night Club"
1959	The Restless Gun	Madame Brimstone	Episode: "Mme. Brimstone"
1960	Mister Magoo	Mother Magoo; additional voices	5 episodes
1960	77 Sunset Strip	Mary Field	Episode: "Ten Cents a Death"
1960–1963	The Flintstones	Betty Rubble; additional voices	112 episodes
1960–1961	Peter Loves Mary	Wilma	32 episodes
1961	The Many Loves of Dobie Gillis	Telephone Operator	Episode: "Spaceville"
1961	Top Cat	Various characters (voices)	6 episodes
1962	The New Breed	Miss Horne	Episode: "A Motive Named Walter"
1962	Pete and Gladys	Mrs. Springer	Episode: "Continental Dinner"
1962	The Jetsons	Emily Scopes/Celeste Skyler	Episode: "A Visit From Grandpa"
1962–1963, 1967	The Beverly Hillbillies	Cousin Pearl Bodine	23 episodes
1963–1968	Petticoat Junction	Kate Bradley	164 episodes
1965–1966	Green Acres	Kate Bradley	6 episodes

== Awards and honors ==
Year	Award	Category	Title of work	Result
1954	Primetime Emmy Award	Outstanding Supporting Actress in a Comedy Series	The George Burns and Gracie Allen Show	Nominated
1955	Primetime Emmy Award	Outstanding Supporting Actress in a Comedy Series	The George Burns and Gracie Allen Show	Nominated

== Bibliography ==
- Aaker, Everett (2007). Television Western Players of the Fifties: A Biographical Encyclopedia of All Regular Cast Members in Western Series, 1949–1959. McFarland & Company. ISBN 978-0-7864-3087-1.
- Blanc, Mel; Bashe, Philip (1988). That's Not All Folks!. Warner Books. ISBN 978-0-446-51244-2.
- Blythe, Cheryl; Sackett, Susan (1989). Say Goodnight, Gracie!: The Story of George Burns and Gracie Allen. Prima Publishing. ISBN 978-1-55958-019-9.
- Cox, Jim (2007). The Great Radio Sitcoms. McFarland & Company. ISBN 978-0-7864-3146-5.
- Cox, Stephen (1993). The Beverly Hillbillies: From the Small Screen to the Big Screen. Harper Perennial. ISBN 978-0-06-097565-4.
- Edelman, Rob; Kupferberg, Audrey (1999). Meet the Mertzes: The Life Stories of I Love Lucy's Other Couple. Renaissance Books. ISBN 978-1-58063-095-5.
- Gitlin, Martin (2013). The Greatest Sitcoms of All Time. Rowman & Littlefield. ISBN 978-0-8108-8724-4.
- Goldmark, Daniel; Granata, Charles L. (2002). The Cartoon Music Book. Chicago Review Press. ISBN 978-1-55652-473-8.
- Irvin, Richard (2014). George Burns Television Productions: The Series and Pilots, 1950–1981. McFarland & Company. ISBN 978-0-7864-9486-6.
- Jones, Chuck; Furniss, Maureen (2005). Chuck Jones: Conversations. University Press of Mississippi. ISBN 978-1-57806-728-2.
- Karol, Michael (2006). Sitcom Queens: Divas of the Small Screen. iUniverse. ISBN 978-0-595-40251-9.
- Kulzer, Dina Marie (1992). Television Series Regulars of the Fifties and Sixties in Interview. McFarland & Company. ISBN 978-0-89950-722-4.
- Mansour, David (2005). From Abba to Zoom: A Pop Culture Encyclopedia of the Late 20th Century. Andrews McMeel Publishing. ISBN 978-0-7407-5118-9.
- Marc, David (1996). Demographic Vistas: Television in American Culture. University of Pennsylvania Press. ISBN 978-0-8122-1560-1.
- Oppenheimer, Jess; Oppenheimer, Greg (1999). Laughs, Luck – and Lucy: How I Came to Create the Most Popular Sitcom of All Time. Syracuse University Press. ISBN 978-0-8156-0584-3.
- Ristow, William (1980). San Francisco Free & Easy. Downwind Publications. ISBN 978-0-913192-02-3.
- Tucker, David C. (2007). The Women Who Made Television Funny: Ten Stars of 1950s Sitcoms. McFarland & Company. ISBN 978-0-7864-2900-4.
- Tucker, David C. (2010). Lost Laughs of '50s and '60s Television: Thirty Sitcoms That Faded Off Screen. McFarland & Company. ISBN 978-0-7864-4466-3.
