= Direct Hit (film) =

- Directed by: Joseph Merhi
- Written by: Jacobsen Hart
- Produced by: Joseph Merhi; Richard Pepin
- Starring: William Forsythe; Jo Champa; Richard Norton; John Aprea; Juliet Landau; George Segal
- Cinematography: Thomas L. Callaway
- Edited by: Charles Bornstein
- Music by: Marc Bonilla
- Distributed by: Heller Highwater Productions
- Release date: December 14, 1994
- Running time: 89 minutes
- Country: United States
- Language: English

Direct Hit is a 1994 direct-to-video action film starring William Forsythe and directed by Joseph Merhi.

== Plot ==
After informing his CIA handlers that his next hit will be his last, John Hatch (Forsythe) discovers that his target isn't a criminal at all. Refusing to take the woman out, Hatch instead takes it upon himself to protect her and expose the web of corruption at work.

== Cast ==
- William Forsythe as Hatch
- Jo Champa as Savannah
- Richard Norton as Rogers
- John Aprea as Terry Daniels
- George Segal as James Tronson
- Juliet Landau as Shelly
- Steve Garvey as Reporter
- Mel Novak as Kovar
- David St. James as Technician
