= Linda Dano =

American actress

- Born: Linda Rae Wildermuth; Long Beach, California, U.S.
- Occupations: Actress; author
- Years active: 1967–present
- Known for: Another World; One Life to Live; Attitudes
- Spouse: Frank Attardi (m. 1982; died 2004)

Linda Dano (born Linda Rae Wildermuth; May 12, 1943, Long Beach, California) is an American actress and television host. She began her career appearing in film and prime time television before she was cast as Rae Cummings on the ABC daytime soap opera, One Life to Live from 1978 to 1980. Three years later, Dano starred as Felicia Gallant in the NBC soap opera Another World from 1983 to 1999. She returned to One Life to Live starring in the show from 1999 to 2004. Dano was nominated for a Daytime Emmy Award seven times, winning once for Outstanding Lead Actress in a Drama Series in 1993 for her work on Another World.

From 1986 to 1991, Dano co-hosted the talk show Attitudes on Lifetime receiving a Daytime Emmy Award for Outstanding Talk Show Host nomination, and had a long-running clothing and home-furnishings line with QVC, first partnering with the home shopping channel in 1993 and ultimately working with them for over 20 years.

== Life and career ==
Dano was born Linda Rae Wildermuth in Long Beach, California, to Evelyn (Delgado) and Ted Wildermuth.

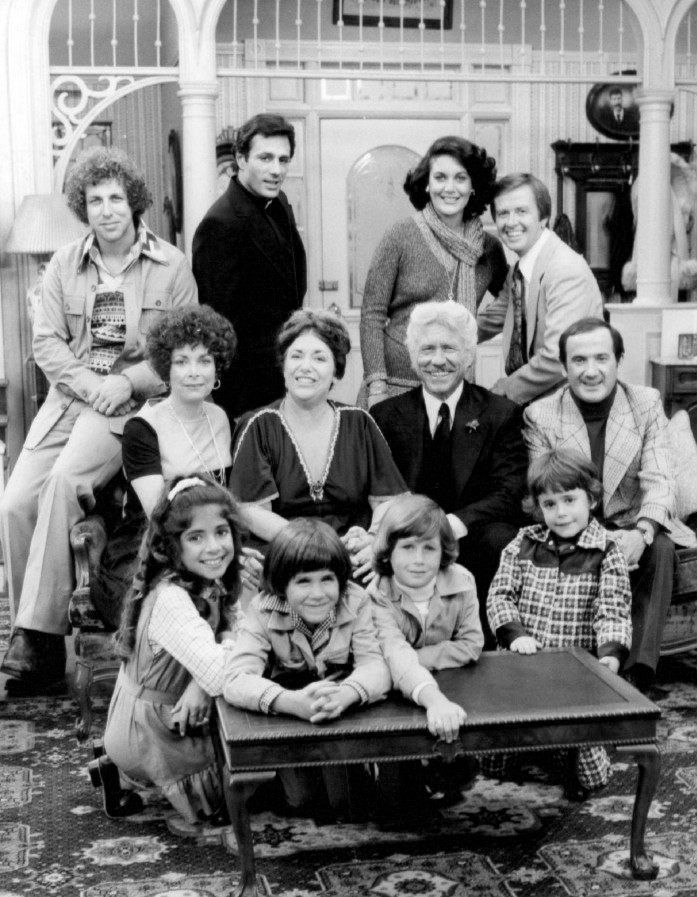
Cast of The Montefuscos (1975). Back row, L-R: Sal Viscuso, John Aprea, Linda Dano, Bill Cort. Middle row: Phoebe Dorin, Naomi Stevens, Joseph Sirola, Ron Carey. Front: Dominique Pinassi, Jeffrey Palladini, Damon Raskin and Robby Paris

=== Early works ===
In late 1960s, Dano began appearing on screen playing small parts in films Tony Rome (1967), Star! (1968) and Hello, Dolly! (1969). In early 1970s, she signed a contract to 20th Century Fox alongside such actors as Tom Selleck and was cast in a numerous primetime programs. Dano guest-starred on Ironside, Police Woman, Harry O, Petrocelli, The Rockford Files (in three different roles), Starsky & Hutch, Charlie's Angels, and CHiPS, as well as in Emergency!, Barney Miller, and The Six Million Dollar Man (in two different roles). In 1975, Dano starred in the short-lived 1975 NBC comedy series, The Montefuscos, which was cancelled after three episodes were broadcast and ultimately ran for seven. She had supporting roles in the made-for-television movies The Last Survivors (1975), The Nurse Killer (1975), and The Night That Panicked America (1975). She starred alongside Joe Don Baker in the 1977 Western horror film, The Shadow of Chikara.

=== 1978–2005 ===
In 1978, Dano moved to New York City and joined the ABC daytime soap opera One Life to Live in the role of Gretel Cummings to 1980. From 1981 to 1982, she played Cynthia Haines on As the World Turns. In 1983, Dano was cast as glamorous romance novelist Felicia Gallant in the NBC soap opera, Another World. Dano played Felicia until the show's final episode on June 25, 1999, Dano received the Daytime Emmy Award for Outstanding Lead Actress in a Drama Series for her performance of Felicia in 1993. She was also nominated for Leading Actress Emmys in 1994 and 1996, and for Supporting Actress in 1992.

From 1986 to 1991, Dano hosted the Lifetime talk show Attitudes, for which she received Daytime Emmy Award for Outstanding Talk Show Host nomination, and has both been a guest and guest-host on The View. Lifetime Television dedicated an episode of its Intimate Portrait celebrity biography series to Dano in 2000. Dano was impersonated on NBC's Saturday Night Live in the late 1980s by Nora Dunn. Dano hosted an Another World reunion special on SOAPnet in 2003 for which she was later nominated for a Daytime Emmy for Outstanding Special Class Special. Dano has written a style and fashion column for Soap Opera Digest on and off for years, and has had her own merchandise lines on QVC, with Dano having celebrated her 20th anniversary affiliated with the home shopping network in February 2013. In 1999, she won the Accessories Council Excellence Award for outstanding contributions to consumer awareness.

Dano starred opposite Jaclyn Smith in the 1986 miniseries, Rage of Angels: The Story Continues based on novel by Sidney Sheldon. She appeared in the television movies Perry Mason: The Case of the Killer Kiss (1993), When the Vows Break (1995) opposite Patty Duke, and See Jane Date (2003). She also guest-starred on Homicide: Life on the Street and appeared in the independent film Somewhere in the City (1998).

On June 28, 1999, Dano returned to One Life to Live as Gretel, now calling herself "Rae" Cummings. The character also appeared on the three other ABC soap operas at the time — All My Children, General Hospital, and Port Charles — in a crossover storyline, which was the first time a daytime character had ever appeared on four series. In 2003, Dano was nominated for a Daytime Emmy for Supporting Actress for the role, and left One Life to Live on March 13, 2004. In 2005, Dano appeared briefly as Lena Kendall on CBS soap opera, Guiding Light.

=== Later years ===
Dano left daytime television in 2005 and moved to Connecticut. Since then, she guest-starred in episodes of Desperate Housewives and What I Like About You, as well as appeared in the 2007 crime drama film, Reservation Road. In 2005, she appeared as the title character in Mame at the Bucks County Playhouse.

In 2019, after more than ten years off-screen, Dano appeared in the Hallmark television film, Chronicle Mysteries: Vines That Bind starring another soap opera veteran, Alison Sweeney. In early 2021, Dano stepped into the role briefly of Vivian Alamain on NBC soap opera, Days of Our Lives. In 2021, Dano starred in a Hallmark comedy film production, A Little Daytime Drama playing the role of the creator/producer of popular long-running daytime series.

== Personal life ==
Dano was married to actor Frank Attardi for over 20 years until his death in 2004. She has two stepchildren, three step-grandchildren, a niece, and a nephew.

For several years, Dano has worked with organizations to tackle medical conditions such as depression and Alzheimer's disease. Her father's life was taken by the effects of Alzheimer's, and she battled depression later after the double loss of her husband and her mother, Evelyn, a week-and-a-half afterward, with her mother showing signs of dementia before her death. Dano is active in such groups as HeartShare, the National Osteoporosis Foundation, the National Alzheimer's Association, and Support Partners, among others. Dano is also a patron of the Catholic Guardian Society of New York.

HeartShare Human Services of New York bestows an annual "Linda Dano Award".

== Filmography ==
Year	Title	Role	Notes
1967	Tony Rome	Minor role	Uncredited
1968	Star!	Charles' Wife	
1969	Hello, Dolly!	Minor role	Uncredited
1973	Police Story	Girl	Episode: "Death on Credit"
1974	The Fess Parker Show	Julie Weston	Television pilot
1974	Ironside	Katherine	Episode: "Raise the Devil: Part 1"
1974	Police Woman	Mary Elliott	Episode: "The End Game"
1974	Emergency!	Lora Gibson	Episode: "The Firehouse Four"
1975	Get Christie Love!	Pickpocket	Episode: "Our Lady in London"
1975	Lucas Tanner	Leslie	Episode: "Why Not a Happy Ending?"
1975	Harry O	Barbara Milland	Episode: "Double Jeopardy"
1975	The Last Survivors	Linda Collison	Television film
1975	The Nurse Killer	Kamala	Television film
1975	The Montefuscos	Angelina "Angie" Montefusco Cooney	Series regular, 9 episodes
1975	The Rockford Files	Ellen Murdock	Episode: "Aura Lee, Farewell"
1975	The Night That Panicked America	Secretary	
1976	Matt Helm	Nurse	Episode: "Panic"
1976	Emergency!	Joyce	Episode: "Above and Beyond... Nearly"
1976	Jigsaw John	Holly Johnson	Episode: "Homicide Is a Fine Art"
1976	The Rockford Files	Marie	Episode: "In Hazard"
1976	Holmes and Yoyo	Margaux	Episode: "Connection, Connection II"
1976	Petrocelli	Lila Danford	Episode: "The Pay Off"
1977	The Rockford Files	Gwen Molinaro	Episode: "Sticks and Stones May Break Your Bones, But Waterbury Will Bury You"
1977	The Shadow of Chikara	Rosalie Cutter	
1977	Starsky and Hutch	Janet Mayer	Episode: "The Crying Child"
1977	Charlie's Angels	Joy	Episode: "Angels on the Air"
1977	The Six Million Dollar Man	Dr. Angela Burns	Episode: "The Ghostly Teletype"
1977	Rafferty	Marian Bakersmith	Episode: "Walking Wounded"
1978	Barney Miller	Leslie Dornan	Episode: "Rape"
1978	CHiPs	Eloise	Episode: "Hitch-Hiking Hitch"
1978	The Six Million Dollar Man	Margaret Winslow	Episode: "Dead Ringer"
1978	The Hardy Boys/Nancy Drew Mysteries	Josette	Episodes: " Voodoo Doll: Part 1" and "Voodoo Doll: Part 2"
1978–1980, 1999–2004	One Life to Live	Gretel Rae Cummings	Series regular Nominated — Daytime Emmy Award for Outstanding Supporting Actress in a Drama Series (2003)
1981–1982	As the World Turns	Cynthia Haines	Series regular
1983–1999	Another World	Felicia Gallant	Series regular Daytime Emmy Award for Outstanding Lead Actress in a Drama Series (1993); Nominated — Daytime Emmy Award for Outstanding Lead Actress in a Drama Series (1992, 1994, 1996); Nominated — Soap Opera Digest Award for Outstanding Supporting Actress (1993); Nominated — Soap Opera Digest Award for Outstanding Comic Performance by an Actress: Daytime (1989); Nominated — Soap Opera Digest Award for Favorite Veteran (1999)
1986	Rage of Angels: The Story Continues	Margot Delefont	Television film
1986–1991	Attitudes	Host	Nominated — Daytime Emmy Award for Outstanding Talk Show Host (1989)
1993	Perry Mason: The Case of the Killer Kiss	Sandra Drake	Television film
1995	When the Vows Break	Helene	Television film
1997	Homicide: Life on the Street	Dr. Miano	Episode: "Valentine's Day"
1998	Somewhere in the City	Television Producer	
1999–2000	All My Children	Gretel Rae Cummings	Special guest star
2000	Port Charles	Gretel Rae Cummings	Special guest star
2003	General Hospital	Gretel Rae Cummings	Special guest star
2003	See Jane Date	Aunt Ina	Television film
2004	The Another World Reunion	Host	Television special Nominated — Daytime Emmy Award for Outstanding Special Class Special
2005	Guiding Light	Lena Kendall	Recurring role
2005	Desperate Housewives	Francine Williams	Episode: "Color and Light"
2006	What I Like About You	Eileen Meladeo	Episode: "The Other Women"
2007	Reservation Road	Grandmother	
2019	Vines That Bind	Vivian Macklin	Television film
2021	Days of Our Lives	Vivian Alamain	Recurring role
2021	A Little Daytime Drama	Alice Hamlin	Television film

== Books ==
=== Romance novels ===
During her run on Another World, Dano co-wrote at least one romance novel published under the name of her character Felicia Gallant.

- Gallant, Felicia, with Rebecca Flanders (1984). Dreamweaver. Harlequin. ISBN 0-373-97012-9. OCLC 11693590.

Donna Ball was a co-author.

=== Style guides ===
- Dano, Linda, with Anne Kyle (1997). Looking Great: Fashion Authority and Television Star Linda Dano Shares Her Style and Beauty Secrets to Help You Look Your Best. G.P. Putnam's Sons. ISBN 0-399-52387-1. OCLC 35688092.
- Dano, Linda, with Anne Kyle (1998). Living Great: Style Expert and Television Star Linda Dano Shows You How to Bring Style Home With Her Easy, Affordable Decorating Ideas and Techniques. Putnam. ISBN 0-399-14392-0. OCLC 37782918.
