= Wolf (American TV series) =

American crime drama television series

- Genre: Crime drama
- Created by: David E. Peckinpah; Rod Holcomb
- Directed by: Bill Corcoran; Rod Holcomb
- Starring: Jack Scalia; Joseph Sirola; Nicolas Surovy; Judith Hoag
- Country of origin: United States
- Original language: English
- No. of seasons: 1
- No. of episodes: 14 (2 unaired)

Production
- Executive producer: David E. Peckinpah
- Producer: Ken Swor
- Running time: 60 minutes
- Production companies: Holcomb/Peckinpah Productions; CBS Entertainment Productions

Original release
- Network: CBS
- Release: September 13, 1989 – June 28, 1990

Wolf is an American crime drama television series starring Jack Scalia and Nicolas Surovy which aired on CBS from September 13, 1989 to June 28, 1990. It features Scalia as Tony Wolf, a former cop turned private detective, with Surovy as the district attorney who had caused him to be discharged from the force. Joseph Sirola starred as Wolf's father, Sal, who lived on a boat.

== Plot ==
Tony Wolf was a San Francisco policeman who now works as a fisherman and sometime private eye. Originally a narcotics officer for the SFPD, Tony was framed and took the fall as a crooked cop. Drummed off the force, he wandered the world for a couple of years, before finally returning home to The City to make amends with his aging father and to take over the family fishing boat. He has also tried to re-kindle a relationship with Connie, an old flame.

== Cast ==
- Jack Scalia as Tony Wolf
- Joseph Sirola as Sal Lupo
- Nicolas Surovy as Dylan Elliott
- J.C. Brandy as Angeline Bacarri
- Mimi Kuzyk as Connie Bacarri
- Judith Hoag as Melissa Shaw Elliott

== Episodes ==
No.	Title	Directed by	Written by	Original release date
1 2	"Pilot"	Rod Holcomb	David Peckinpah	September 13, 1989
Note: 2-hour TV movie.
3	"Two Men and a Baby"	Bill Corcoran	Garner Simmons	October 3, 1989
4	"Running on Empty"	Rod Holcomb	Michael Berlin & Eric Estrin	September 26, 1989
5	"On the Run"	Rod Holcomb	Elliott Anderson	September 19, 1989
6	"Betrayal"	Jim Johnston	David Peckinpah	November 14, 1989
7	"Little Girl Lost"	Michael Ray Rhodes	Deborah Arakelian & David E. Peckinpah	June 21, 1990
8	"Vengeance"	David Jackson	Michael A. Graham	June 28, 1990
9	"Strike, Part One"	N/A	N/A	UNAIRED
10	"Strike, Part Two"	N/A	N/A	UNAIRED
11	"Danny"	Mark Laub	Deborah Arakelian	September 24, 1989
12	"Echoes of Yesterday"	Michael Preece	Michael A. Graham	October 24, 1989
13	"Curtains of Silence"	Daniel Attias	Michael Berlin & Eric Estrin	October 10, 1989
14	"Guns and Roses"	Michael Ray Rhodes	Garner Simmons	November 7, 1989
