= The Montefuscos =

- Genre: Comedy
- Created by: Bill Persky; Sam Denoff
- Directed by: Don Richardson; Bill Brinckerhoff
- Starring: Joseph Sirola; Naomi Stevens; Ron Carey
- Composer: Peter Lurye
- Country of origin: United States
- Original language: English
- No. of seasons: 1
- No. of episodes: 8 (plus 1 pre-empted)

Production
- Executive producers: Bill Persky; Sam Denoff
- Producers: Don Van Atta; Bill Idelson
- Production companies: Concept II Productions; MGM Television

Original release
- Network: NBC
- Release: September 4 – October 23, 1975

The Montefuscos is an American sitcom broadcast on NBC in September, 1975. The series was cancelled after only three episodes due to poor ratings and unfavorable critical reviews. NBC broadcast a total of eight episodes (a ninth was pre-empted by Game 5 of the 1975 World Series) from September 4 to October 23, 1975 despite its earlier cancellation notice. Created by executive producers Bill Persky and Sam Denoff, the comedy centered on three generations of an Italian-American family that lived in New Canaan, Connecticut and their weekly gatherings for Sunday dinner. It led off a Thursday prime time schedule that also featured new programs Fay, Ellery Queen and Medical Story.

== Cast ==
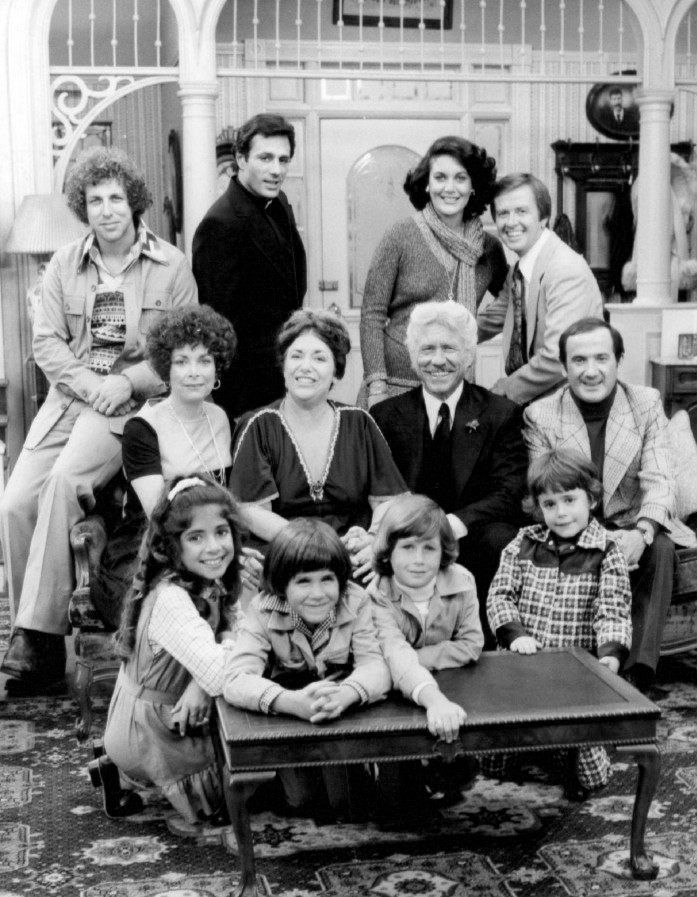
From left: Back-son Nunzio (Sal Viscuso), son Joseph (John Aprea), daughter Angie (Linda Dano), son in law Jim (Bill Cort). Middle-Daughter in Law Teresa (Phoebe Dorin), mother Rose (Naomi Stevens), father Tony (Joseph Sirola), son Frank (Ron Carey). Front-the grandchildren played by: Dominique Pinassi, Jeffrey Palladini, Damon Raskin and Robby Paris.

- Joseph Sirola as Tony "Papa" Montefusco, patriarch of the family.
- Naomi Stevens as Rose "Mama" Montefusco, Tony's wife.
- Ron Carey as Frank Montefusco, the oldest son and a dentist.
- Phoebe Dorin as Theresa Montefusco, Frank's wife.
- John Aprea as Joseph "Joey" Montefusco, the middle son and a Catholic priest.
- Sal Viscuso as Nunzio Montefusco, the youngest son and an actor.
- Linda Dano as Angelina "Angie" Montefusco Cooney, the daughter.
- Bill Cort as Jim Cooney, Angelina's Episcopalian husband.
- Damon Raskin as Anthony Patrick Cooney, Jim and Angelina's son.
- Dominique Pinassi as Gina Montefusco, Frank and Theresa's daughter.
- Jeffrey Palladini as Anthony Carmine Montefusco, Frank and Theresa's son.
- Robby Paris as Jerome Montefusco, Frank and Theresa's son.

== Production ==
The sitcom's original title prior to its debut was Sunday Night Dinner, but it was changed by NBC's vice president of programming Marvin Antonowsky as a result of unfavorable test results. Thirteen episodes were videotaped before a live audience, but only eight aired.

The program earned a spot on the network's 1975–76 primetime schedule over The Cop and the Kid, another sitcom which was about a Los Angeles police officer (Charles Durning) forced to adopt a street-smart young black orphan (Tierre Turner). Antonowsky explained, "What eliminated The Cop and the Kid was that it was an 8 o'clock show, and we felt The Montefuscos had better characters, an abundance of them. It was a show more easily sampled." Originally planned for Fridays at 8:30 pm ET, The Montefuscos replaced The Family Holvak on Thursdays at 8:00 pm ET as a result of CBS's move of M*A*S*H to Fridays which forced NBC to reverse a proposed shift of Chico and the Man to Wednesdays at 9:00 pm ET.

== Reception ==
The series generally received unfavorable reviews from television critics, some of whom called it "The Monte-Fiascos." John J. O'Connor of The New York Times pointed out the primary target of the criticism when he stated, "We are obviously, snugly ensconced in the world of stereotype." He described the members of the fictional family as tending "to shout frequently, throw their arms about one another, slap one another's back."

Gary Deeb of the Chicago Tribune was much less tactful in his analysis, saying that it was "a program built around an alleged Italian family in which each member talked with his hands, drank gallons of red wine, and said 'AY!' approximately every 15 seconds." He added, "If you grew up in a real Italian family, this shameful piece of burlesque will have you writhing in disbelief."

== Cancellation ==
The Montefuscos was slated to air opposite the first half-hour of The Waltons on CBS and Barney Miller on ABC. It debuted along with Fay and Medical Story on September 4, 1975, just prior to premiere week. Three weeks later on September 25, NBC announced that The Montefuscos and Fay would be dropped from its primetime schedule after October 23 because of poor showings in the Nielsen ratings. Both shows were the first ones cancelled during the 1975–76 television season. Explaining the network's decision on The Montefuscos, Antonowsky said, "It was simply a poor show."

ABC Television president Fred Pierce spoke out against NBC's swift cancellations, pointing out that the ratings for Barney Miller in its first season were no better than those of The Montefuscos under the similar circumstance of going opposite The Waltons in the same time slot. He explained, "Unless a show is absolutely hopeless, a network ought at least try it in another time period before giving up on it, if only out of respect for the people in Hollywood who made large investments of money and time in the programs."

== Episodes ==
No.	Title	Original release date
1	"Behind Papa's Back"	September 4, 1975
Tony's reading of his will after dinner has the other family members worried about his health.
2	"My Son, the Actor"	September 11, 1975
The family anticipates Nunzio's professional acting debut on a live, local television production.
3	"Nunzie's Girl"	September 18, 1975
Nunzio's girlfriend (Candice Azzara) is revealed to have once secretly dated Frank.
4	"The Last of the Red Hot Dinners"	September 25, 1975
Tony is furious when his son-in-law Jim is late for dinner because he attended a football game.
5	"Do You Take This Montefusco"	October 2, 1975
Tony & Rose's 40th wedding anniversary celebration is marred by an angry outburst during Mass.
6	"Too Many Cooks"	October 9, 1975
With Rose ill from an infected wisdom tooth, the rest of the family attempts to prepare dinner.
7	"Here Comes the Priest"	October 16, 1975
The family anxiously awaits the Bishop's arrival, hoping Joey is appointed pastor of the local parish. Note: This episode was originally scheduled to air that night, but was preempted by the network's telecast of Game 5 of the 1975 World Series.
8	"Filomena's Visit"	October 23, 1975
Filomena (Kaye Ballard), Tony's sister and Rose's bitter rival, interrupts Sunday dinner.
9	"Papa Pasta"	October 23, 1975
