= Opie Cates =

- Born: Opal Taft Cates; October 10, 1909; Arkansas
- Origin: Kansas and Missouri
- Died: November 6, 1987 (aged 78) Oklahoma
- Genres: Swing
- Occupation: Band leader
- Instrument: Clarinet
- Years active: 1930s–1940s

Opie Cates (10 October 1909 – 6 November 1987) was an American clarinet player and band leader in the 1930s and 1940s, during the swing era, who became a radio actor.

== Early life and career ==
Cates was born Opal Taft Cates, the son of a farmer in Arkansas, and was also raised in Kansas and Missouri.

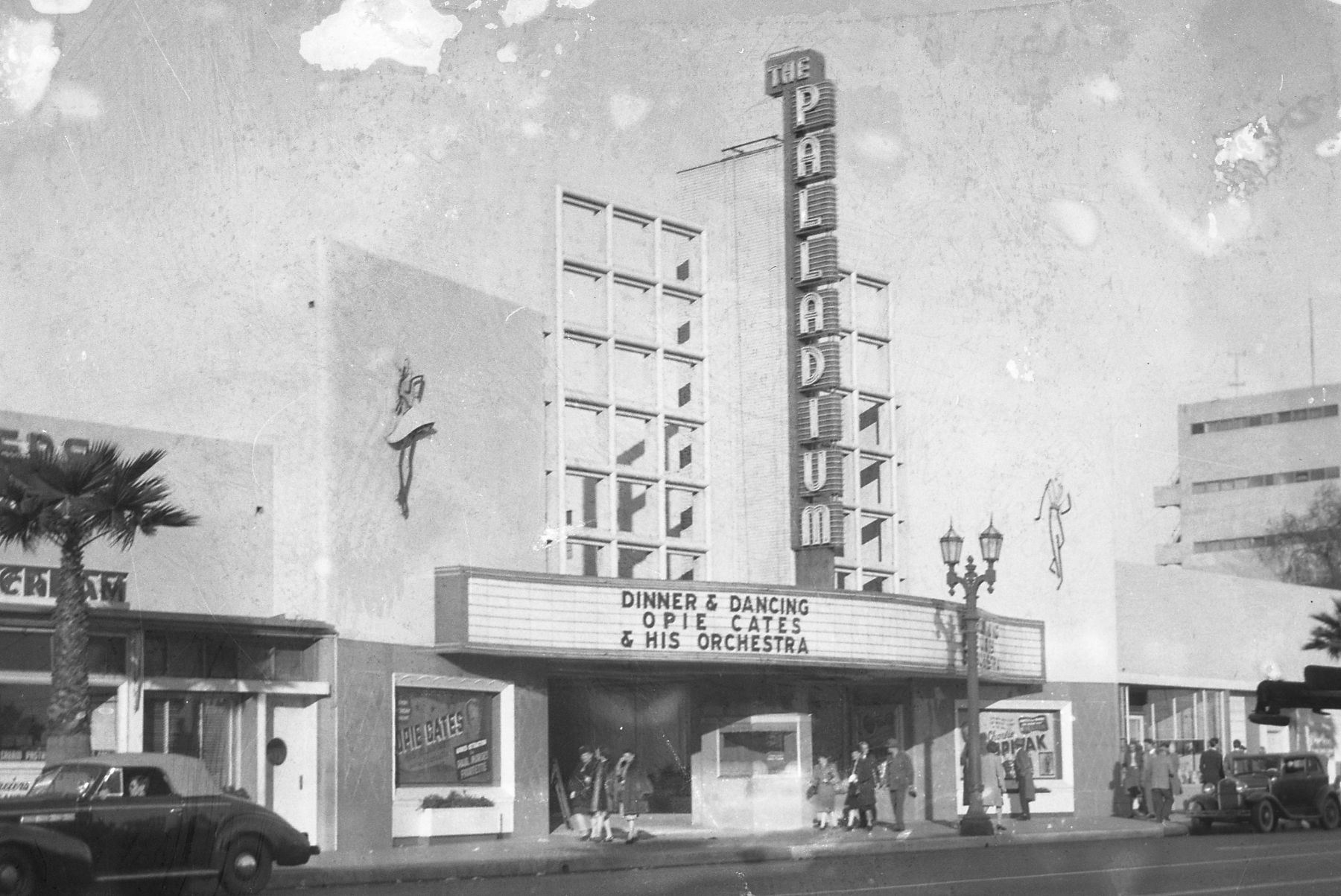
Opie Cates was on the bill at the Hollywood Palladium in 1947.

By 1931 he was on the radio with his own band. He served for a time in the 1940s as musical director on radio's Judy Canova Show, where his Arkansas drawl amused audiences when he introduced songs. He then became the star of his own radio sitcom, The Opie Cates Show, on ABC in 1947–1948, where he played a naive rube getting adjusted to big city life. Barbara Fuller played his love interest, with Francis X. Bushman as her father, Opie's boss. Cates would begin each show by saying, "The doggonedest thing happened to me th' other day," and proceed to introduce the episode's plot. The show found no sponsor and lasted only thirteen weeks. He reappeared in more or less the same role in the rural milieu of radio's Lum and Abner in 1949, telling stories about his hometown of Clinton, Arkansas, and was included in the pilot episode of an unsold television version of Lum and Abner that year.

Cates was also musical director of the NBC radio show Meet Me at Parky's (1945), starring Parkyakarkus, and of Granby's Green Acres, a 1950 CBS radio show with much of the Lum and Abner cast that later inspired the television series Green Acres.

Andy Griffith named his character's son "Opie Taylor" on The Andy Griffith Show after Opie Cates, whom Griffith and producer Sheldon Leonard both liked.

== Death ==
On November 6, 1987, Cates died at his home in Moffett, Oklahoma at the age of 78.
