= Salvatore Tessio =

Fictional character from The Godfather series

- Abe Vigoda portraying Salvatore Tessio
- First appearance: The Godfather
- Last appearance: The Godfather
- Created by: Mario Puzo
- Portrayed by: Abe Vigoda; John Aprea

In-universe information
- Nicknames: Sal, Sally, Salvodoro
- Gender: Male
- Occupation: Gangster

Salvatore "Sal" Tessio is a fictional character in Mario Puzo's 1969 novel The Godfather, as well as two of the films based on it: The Godfather (1972) and The Godfather Part II (1974). His given name was created for the films; in the novel he is referred to only as "Tessio". In the film The Godfather, Tessio was portrayed by Abe Vigoda. In The Godfather Part II, John Aprea portrays the younger Tessio, while Vigoda reprises the role in a flashback, set in late 1941, at the end of the film.

Tessio has also appeared in the 2004 novel The Godfather Returns and the 2006 video game The Godfather.

== In the novel and film ==
Tessio befriends Peter Clemenza and Vito Corleone and they begin their criminal careers as low-level hoodlums in the New York City neighborhood of Little Italy in Manhattan; as Vito rises to power and prominence in the Mafia underworld, Tessio and Clemenza become his trusted caporegimes. Eventually Vito splits Tessio from Clemenza and asks the two not to socialize unless absolutely necessary, both to remove the threat of a conspiracy against him and also to set up Tessio to function as a "safety valve caporegime" whose Mafia soldiers can be called upon by the Corleone family in emergencies. Tessio establishes his regime in Brooklyn, where he is well-connected, and owns the Embassy Club as a base of operations.

Most federal investigators consider Tessio the smarter, savvier, and more ruthless of the Corleone capos. However, according to the book, he mellows considerably over the decade of peace between New York's Mafia families. One of the strengths of the Corleone Family is that, given Tessio's control over Brooklyn, some enemies do not know that Tessio's regime functions within the Corleone Empire, and thus do not understand the extra strength it has.

When Vito is shot and wounded by drug lord Virgil Sollozzo's men, igniting a war among the Five Families, Tessio serves as the right-hand man of Vito's eldest son Sonny, who runs the family while Vito is incapacitated. In the novel, Tessio is depicted as thinking more highly of Vito's youngest son and eventual successor Michael than do Clemenza and Corleone family consigliere Tom Hagen. However, he never completely trusts Michael, and is frustrated when Michael prevents him from retaliating against rival Don Emilio Barzini as the Barzini family chips away at his bailiwick in Brooklyn. Ultimately, Tessio betrays Michael by helping arrange an attempt on Michael's life at a peace summit with Barzini and Philip Tattaglia. The summit will be held in Tessio's fiefdom in Brooklyn, where Michael will presumably be safe. In return, Tessio was to inherit the Corleone family upon Michael's death.

In the novel, Tessio helps broker the summit shortly after Vito's death. In the film, Tessio approaches Michael at Vito's funeral about setting up the peace summit, Michael already anticipated the plot via his father's warning: whoever approached Michael about the peace summit would be the family traitor. Tessio's betrayal surprises Hagen, who thought Clemenza would be the one to betray Michael. Michael tells him, "It's the smart move; Tessio was always smarter."

A few days later, Tessio is ready to escort Michael and Hagen to Brooklyn for the meeting when Willi Cicci informs Tessio that Michael is going separately. A frustrated Tessio says it interferes with his "arrangements". Hagen says he cannot go either, and several hitmen surround Tessio. Immediately understanding his situation, Tessio calmly tells Hagen to tell Michael that his betrayal was not personal, but simply business. Tessio asks Hagen to get him off the hook, but Hagen declines. Accepting his fate, Tessio goes quietly as he is taken away to be killed.

== In sequel novels ==
Mario Puzo's original novel and the film imply Tessio's death, but Mark Winegardner's sequel novel The Godfather Returns explains that he is executed with a gunshot at point blank range by his enforcer Nick Geraci. In this novel, Geraci is chosen and intended to succeed him as capo, but in the original novel, Al Neri takes over the old Tessio regime.

== In Godfather: The Game ==
In the video game adaptation, Tessio is the main hit contractor for the first half of the game's story. Later, after he is confronted by Tom Hagen and Cicci, Tessio is escorted to the place where he was to betray Michael by the game's protagonist, Aldo Trapani. He subsequently flees, but is hunted down and killed by Trapani. In the game, Tessio's death takes place before the baptism executions, unlike in the film.
