= Granby's Green Acres =

American radio situation comedy series

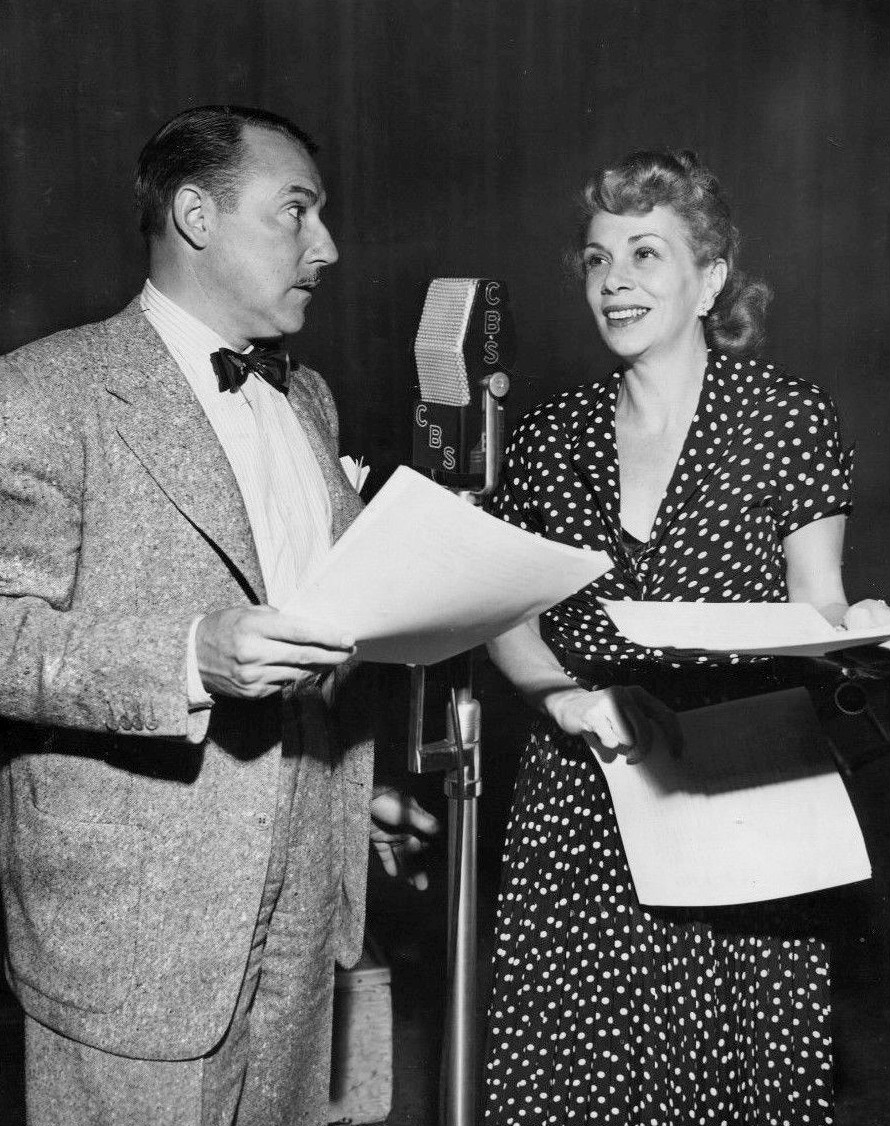
- Gale Gordon and Bea Benaderet in 1950
- Genre: Situation comedy
- Running time: 30 minutes
- Country of origin: United States
- Language: English
- Syndicates: CBS
- TV adaptations: Green Acres
- Starring: Gale Gordon; Bea Benaderet
- Announcer: Bob LeMond
- Written by: Jay Sommers
- Directed by: Jay Sommers
- Produced by: Jay Sommers
- Original release: July 3 – August 21, 1950
- Opening theme: Old MacDonald Had a Farm

Granby's Green Acres is a radio situation comedy from the United States. It was broadcast on CBS July 3, 1950 – August 21, 1950, as a summer replacement for Lux Radio Theatre.

== Premise ==
Granby's Green Acres featured a former banker "who knew little about farming and proved it every week".

== Characters and cast ==
Three of the main characters on Granby's Green Acres were much like those heard on many other situation comedies on radio: a husband, his "somewhat addled and impractical" wife, and "their breathless teenage daughter". Radio historian John Dunning wrote that the husband and wife were "inspired by characters heard on the Lucille Ball show, My Favorite Husband." In fact, radio regulars Gale Gordon and Bea Benaderet (who played John and Martha Granby) also played Mr. and Mrs. Atterbury on My Favorite Husband. Dunning noted, "The names were changed, but the basic characters remained the same."

Granby's Green Acres was Benaderet's "one and only full-fledged starring role on radio". Two other regulars were also familiar to radio listeners. Louise Erickson played Janice, the Granbys' daughter, and Parley Baer played Eb, the farm's hired hand. The storekeeper, Will Kimble, was played by Howard McNear in the first episode and by Horace Murphy in subsequent broadcasts.

Bob LeMond was the announcer, and Opie Cates was the music director.

== Critical response ==
A review in the trade publication Variety called Granby's Green Acres "a brave but futile effort to put together a situation comedy around Gale Gordon". It said that the episode reviewed had "a tepid script" and that the actors "couldn't improve the show's mediocrity."

== Television adaptation ==
Although Granby's Green Acres was not transferred directly to television, as were many old-time radio programs, it was the inspiration for Green Acres. The television program followed two popular programs (The Beverly Hillbillies and Petticoat Junction) produced by Paul Henning, as Jeffrey Westhoff explained:

CBS asked Henning to create a third show. To avoid the stress of running three shows at once, Henning asked Petticoat writer Jay Sommers to create and produce this new program. Sommers proposed reviving Granby's Green Acres, changing the farmer's name and shortening the title. This meant that Benaderet's old radio show had become a spinoff of her television show.

== History ==
In 1948, Granby's Green Acres was auditioned for a slot on ABC radio with Hanley Stafford originally set to star.

The show's creator, Jay Sommers, based its concept on memories of time he spent as a boy on a farm near Greendale, New York. His stepfather went broke trying to make the farm successful.

Of the eight episodes that aired in 1950, five remain in existence, as does the unaired pilot episode.
