= To the Limit (1995 film) =

1995 American film

- Directed by: Raymond Martino
- Produced by: PM Entertainment Group
- Starring: Anna Nicole Smith; Michael Nouri; Joey Travolta
- Release date: July 1995
- Running time: 93 minutes
- Country: United States
- Language: English

To the Limit is a 1995 action thriller film directed by Raymond Martino and starring Michael Nouri as China Smith and Joey Travolta as Frank Davinci. The film is a sequel to DaVinci's War, and its plot concerns a CIA rogue division war against the criminal underworld. It was the first starring role for Anna Nicole Smith, coming after being named Playboy Playmate of the Year.

== Plot summary ==
Anna Nicole Smith plays Vickie Lynn, an ex-CIA agent going by the pseudonym "Collette" who is attempting to track down the leader of an organization of trained assassins to exact revenge for the murder of her husband. Joey Travolta is Frank DaVinci, an ex Vietnam War veteran who is also after the same man for his own reasons. In light of this, they agree to work together to track him down with the help of Lynn's boyfriend, assassin China Smith, played by Michael Nouri.

In the opening scenes, Vickie's husband is killed in a car bombing, which forces her to go into hiding. Meanwhile, Da Vinci's wedding is interrupted when a large group of masked gunmen attack the ceremony resulting in a massive shootout where Da Vinci is wounded, but his young bride Lupe (played by Rebecca Ferratti) is killed, along with several civilians, as well as several of Da Vinci's bodyguards, and all of the attacking gunmen are killed as well. In the hospital, another attempt is made on Da Vinci's life when a female assassin, named Maryann, attempts to kill him in his hospital bed by injecting a syringe into his I.V. drip, but he survives by pulling out the I.V. drip in time. After this, Da Vinci goes into hiding at his retreat house in Las Vegas.

Six months later, Da Vinci recovers enough when, by chance, he runs into Vickie and they agree to help each other find the person responsible for the losses of their loved ones. The perpetrator is revealed to be corrupt and ruthless CIA officer Arthur Jameson (played by Jack Bannon). Knowing that he and Lynn (still going by the name "Collette") can't face Jameson alone, he enlists the help of his war colleagues (Branscombe Richmond and Gino Dente) and two ex-mobster brothers named Philly (John Aprea), and Joey Bambino (David Proval) to find the location of Jameson's hideout.

== Cast ==
- Joey Travolta as Frank DaVinci
- Michael Nouri as Thomas "China" Smith
- Anna Nicole Smith as Collette / Vickie Lynn
- David Proval as Joey Bambino
- John Aprea as Philly Bambino
- Rebecca Ferratti as Lupe (replacing Vanity from the first film)
- Branscombe Richmond as Don Williams
- Gino Dente as Elvis
- Jack Bannon as Arthur Jameson
- Lydie Denier as Frannie
- Floyd Levine as Father Rich
- Scott Leva as Carlo
