= Stevie D =

- Directed by: Chris Cordone
- Written by: Chris Cordone
- Starring: Torrey DeVitto; Kevin Chapman; John Aprea; Spencer Garrett; Hal Linden; Robert Costanzo
- Production company: Pelican Productions
- Release date: February 25, 2016
- Running time: 119 minutes
- Country: United States
- Language: English

Stevie D is a 2016 comedy crime drama film directed and written by Chris Cordone. The film stars Torrey DeVitto, Kevin Chapman, John Aprea, Spencer Garrett and Chris Cordone. Shot in Los Angeles and Palm Springs, it was released on February 25, 2016. The film's writer and director Chris Cordone plays the titular character Stevie D.

== Plot ==
Stevie D (Chris Cordone) is the son of a developer, Angelo (John Aprea). Stevie D accidentally kills the son of a crime boss, Nick (Al Sapienza) and Nick decides to seek revenge. His plan is to hire two hitmen, Big Lou and Little Dom (Phil Idrissi and Darren Capozzi) to kill Stevie D in front of his father. Angelo then hires an actor who looks surprisingly similar to his son to pretend to be Stevie-D until Nick gets his revenge. The actor, Michael, starts to live his new life as Stevie D with all the perks of dating Stevie’s women, driving his cars and spending his money.

== Cast ==
- Chris Cordone as Stevie D / Michael Rose
- Torrey DeVitto as Daria Laurentis
- Kevin Chapman as Lenny
- John Aprea as Angelo DiMarco
- Spencer Garrett as Jack Laurentis
- Al Sapienza as Nick Grimaldi
- Robert Costanzo as Tony Muccerino
- Hal Linden as Max Levine
- Phil Idrissi as Big Lou
- Darren Capozzi as Little Don
- Guy Camilleri as Agent Harris
- Jason E. Kelley as Agent Shields
- Alma Martinez as Senator Garcia
- Alex Fernandez as Mayor Arturo Lopez
- Seth Cassell as Johnny

== Release ==
The film was released on February 25, 2016 at Sedona International Film Festival.

== Reception ==
The film received mixed reviews from critics. Katie Walsh of Los Angeles Times said that "at nearly two hours it stretches the conceit and the performers far beyond their range". Hollywood Reporter's Sheri Linden praised the film's casting and especially Kevin Chapman's performance in the role of Lenny.

== Awards ==
Year	Award	Category	Result
2016	Independent Spirit Award	Director's Choice Award	Won
