= Attitudes (talk show) =

- Presented by: Linda Dano; Nancy Glass; Jerry Penacoli; Dee Kelly; Dorothy Lucey; Rolonda Watts
- Country of origin: United States
- Original language: English

Production
- Executive producer: Gae Morris
- Producer: Theresa Coffino
- Running time: 60 minutes

Original release
- Network: Lifetime
- Release: October 6, 1986 – December 1992

Attitudes is an American television talk show on Lifetime that aired from October 6, 1986 to December 1992. Hosted originally by Linda Dano and Nancy Glass, it was taped before a live studio audience at EUE Screen Gems Studios, 222 East 44th Street in New York City. Glass was replaced by singer Dee Kelly following the show's second season, as Glass left to host the nationally syndicated primetime magazine show This Evening. The show then moved to Kaufman Astoria Studios in Queens. Dano's co-host later changed once more, with Jerry Penacoli, who is now host of Extra. The show by this time had evolved into more of a tabloid talk format. Dano, uncomfortable with the changes, left the show. Penacoli was subsequently fired from the show. Both were replaced with Dorothy Lucey and Rolonda Watts as the new co-hosts. The show's audience, unable to accept the loss of Dano as well as disliking the change in format, quickly dropped off and Attitudes was canceled soon after.

Attitudes was the first national talk show hosted by two women and was written about during its tenure in such publications as The New York Times and Vogue and parodied on Saturday Night Live with Nora Dunn as Dano and Jan Hooks as Kelly. With its first hosts, Linda Dano and Nancy Glass, the show was nominated for a Daytime Emmy in the category of Outstanding Talk Show but lost to Sally Jessy Raphael's eponymous Sally. They were the first cable hosts to be nominated in this category.

The show featured numerous celebrity guests from the worlds of entertainment, fashion, and politics. One of the stranger episodes of the show, featuring an incredibly flexible 84-year-old woman, Barbara Moseley, was famously featured in the music video for the Coldplay song "The Hardest Part." The band was digitally inserted into the footage.
