= Anna Stuart =

American actress (born 1948)

- Born: November 1, 1948 (age 77); Bluefield, West Virginia, U.S.
- Occupation: Actress
- Years active: 1964–present
- Spouse: James Cromwell (m. 2014)

Anna Stuart (born November 1, 1948, in Bluefield, West Virginia) is an American actress. She has primarily played roles in daytime serials.

== Career ==
Stuart began her career on The Doctors as lab technician Toni Ferra, a role she played from February 5, 1971 to September 30, 1976. Her character was involved in a triangle with Dr. Mike Powers and Dr. Alan Stewart. She followed up her work on The Doctors originating the role of Dr. Gina Dante Lansing on rival serial General Hospital (1977–1978) where she was reunited with her former "The Doctors" co-star Gerald Gordon who played her brother, Dr. Mark Dante.

In 1981, she filled in for Maeve Kinkead on Guiding Light as Vanessa Chamberlain while Kinkead was on maternity leave. It was during this time that Vanessa was a prime suspect in the murder of Diane Ballard. This was Stuart's first time playing a schemer on the soaps, and led to playing other sophisticated trouble-makers on practically every New York based soap.

=== Another World ===
Stuart is best known for her role as Donna Love Hudson on Another World, which she played from January 1983 to November 1986 and again from February 1989 to the show's final episode in June 1999. The role of Donna Love was written as a very complex society snob, interfering in the love life of her brother Peter and dating Iris's ex-husband, Bay City mayor Brian Bancroft. At first a supporting character, Donna was slowly made a lead as she became involved in a triangle with ex-husband Carl Hutchins and flashy novelist Felicia Gallant. Her storyline became more complex when it was revealed that not only was her sister Marley really her illegitimate daughter, but she'd also given birth to Marley's twin, Victoria, as well. As Stuart became more popular, a major romance was created for her with Michael Hudson (Kale Browne) who was Victoria and Marley's father.

When Stuart left the show in 1986, the role of Donna was recast with Philece Sampler, previously of the serial Days of Our Lives in the early 1980s. Two years later, Sampler's contract was terminated when Stuart expressed interest in returning to Another World. Her return was highlighted by her appearance of the show's 25th-anniversary Soap Opera Digest cover.

Stuart took medical sabbaticals from her role as Donna in 1990 and 1993, during which former Guiding Light and Another World co-star Sofia Landon briefly played the role. In the early 1990s, Donna began a May–December romance with Matthew Cory (Matt Crane), which proved to be very popular. As the 1990s went on, however, the character was written in such a way that longtime viewers no longer recognized Donna. Stuart was quoted in Soap Opera Digest after Another World's cancellation as saying that if the show had not been canceled in 1999, she would have left the role due to her disapproval regarding her character's direction. When Michael Hudson was killed off in 1997, Donna's behavior became particularly bizarre with the character blaming her daughter Victoria for causing Michael's death.

After the show's cancellation, Stuart and several other cast members played their characters on the soap opera As the World Turns. Stuart's appearance was to have lasted for two episodes in order to help introduce the character of Jake McKinnon to the show, but she ended up recurring on the show for almost three years as Donna paid Jake occasional visits after the death of his wife Victoria. Her final appearance in April 2002 took place when Jake was suddenly killed off, with Marley (Ellen Wheeler) and Donna taking Jake and Victoria's children back to Bay City with them.

=== Post-Another World ===
In April 2002, Stuart filled in for former Another World co-star Linda Dano as Gretel Rae Cummings on One Life to Live while Dano was on sick leave.

Immediately following this, Stuart began the role of Mary Smythe (Greenlee's neglectful and self-centered mother) on All My Children where she played opposite former Another World castmate Mark Pinter. She is one of the few actors to have appeared on three soap operas in one calendar year. Intended to be written in for only a short length of time, the character became integral in a plotline in which Mary revealed that Jackson Montgomery was Greenlee's natural father, making her the latest in the long line of rivals to that show's reigning queen, Erica Kane. Mary had a brief romance with Adam Chandler before disappearing off the canvas in 2005. She returned to the show for two episodes in 2009.

In 2010, Stuart debuted on the internet based soap opera Gotham.

== Personal life ==
Stuart married actor James Cromwell on January 1, 2014, at the home of her former Another World co-star Charles Keating.

== Filmography ==
=== Film ===
Year	Title	Role	Notes
1971	South of Hell Mountain	Sally	Credited as Anna Stewart
2000	Tobia al caffè	Spogliarellista	
2023	The Hope Chest Has a Secret Drawer	Rosemary	Short film

=== Television ===
Year	Title	Role	Notes
1964	The Villains	Sylvia	Episode: "Bent"
1965	It's Dark Outside	Sarah	Episode: "The Guilty World of Hosea Pitt"
1971–1976	The Doctors	Toni Ferra Powers	732 episodes
1977–1978	General Hospital	Gina Dante	2 episodes
1981	Guiding Light	Vanessa Chamberlain #2	Temporary replacement for Maeve Kincaid
1983–1999	Another World	Donna Love	972 episodes
1988	Highway to Heaven	Nel	Episode: "Heaven Nose, Mister Smith"
1988	Who's the Boss?	Mother	Episode: "Prom Night II"
1999–2002	As the World Turns	Donna Love	7 episodes
2002	One Life to Live	Rae Cummings	Episode dated April 25, 2002
2002–2009	All My Children	Mary Greenlee Smythe	18 episodes
2009	Gotham the series	Elizabeth Manning	Web-based serial
