= Felicia Gallant =

- Another World character
- Portrayed by: Linda Dano
- Duration: 1983–1999
- First appearance: January 6, 1983
- Last appearance: June 25, 1999
- Created by: Robert Soderberg and Dorothy Ann Purser
- Introduced by: Paul Rauch
In-universe information
- Other names: Fanny Grady
- Occupation: Romance novelist; Talk show host; Restaurant owner; Day spa owner; Innkeeper
- Stepfather: Noah Grady
- Siblings: Robert Grady; Unnamed sister
- Husband: Louis St. George (1970s–1983); Zane Lindquist (1986); Mitch Blake (1988–1990); Lucas Castigliano (1991–1992); Sergei Radzinsky (1999–present)
- Daughters: Lorna Devon
- Adoptive daughters: Jenna Norris
- Nieces: Lisa Grady

Felicia Gallant is a fictional character on the NBC soap opera Another World, played by Linda Dano. The character debuted on the episode broadcast January 6, 1983, and stayed until the show's final episode on June 25, 1999. Dano won a Daytime Emmy award for her portrayal of Felicia in 1993.

== Casting ==
Actress Anna Stuart auditioned for this part but lost the role to Linda Dano. Dano made her first appearance as Felicia on January 6, 1983. Dano stayed on the soap opera until its last episode on June 25, 1999, following its cancellation.

== Development ==
The character of Felicia is a professional romance novelist who lives in Bay City. The character was modeled after real-life romance novelist Jacqueline Susann. Head-writer Robert Soderbergh had been friends with Susann before her death in the 1970s and regularly spoke at length with Linda Dano about Susann's passion for living.

Her character was brought on to bring an element of glamour to the ailing show. She was widely embraced by the fans immediately and became a beloved character on the soap until its end in 1999.

One of Felicia's prominent storylines was her alcoholism. Dano won a Daytime Emmy Award for Outstanding Lead Actress in a Drama Series in 1993. Dano recalled to Soap Opera Digest in 2024 that it was an "amazing" storyline, adding, "I was so pleased to play it. It had a real beat to it. In other words, it was real. And because of it, I got so much mail about people who were struggling with alcohol and didn't know what to do, and they would say to me 'I'm following you and you're helping me. And I can't tell you how appreciative I feel'".

== Storylines ==
Felicia was introduced as a glamorous romance novelist, who wrote for Cory Publishing (Dano wrote romance novels that were published under her character's name). Felicia had affairs with Cass Winthrop, who later became her best friend, and Carl Hutchins. She married Louis St. George, Zane Lindquist, Mitch Blake, Lucas Castigliano, and Sergei Radzinsky. Lucas was, out of all the men she married, the true love of her life. When Lucas came to town, he came looking for the daughter he knew was alive, but she thought was stillborn (Felicia and Lucas had been lovers when they were teenagers). By extension, he revealed that she was born Fanny Grady and from a tempestuous family background. Since Felicia had taken a long time to build up this wealthy and glamorous reputation, it embarrassed her horribly to have other people know her business.

Over time, her marriage to Mitch hit a rough patch, and each cheated on the other. They both accepted their marriage was over and they had a mutual, amicable divorce. With Lucas back in her life, she fell for him all over again, and they were married. However, Lucas was shot by a jealous ex-lover and died in hospital weeks later, leaving Felicia heartbroken.

However, by this time, Felicia had found her daughter, the nasty vixen Lorna Devon (Alicia Coppola). Felicia and Lorna were adversaries for a very long time, but eventually warmed to a mother-daughter relationship. Lorna also made enemies with Felicia's adopted daughter, Jenna; one memorable stunt involved Lorna replacing Jenna's boyfriend's music video with a never-before-seen porn tape with Jenna as the centerpiece, mere seconds before it was to air live on Felicia's talk show.

A later romantic interest for Felicia was John Hudson, as he was having troubles with his marriage to wife Sharlene. She later became engaged to Alexander Nikos, who reminded her of Lucas, but broke it off because of his shady dealings. Her final marriage was to Sergei Radzinsky, whom she married to keep him in the country; he was receiving treatments for aplastic anemia as a result of exposure to Chernobyl.

=== Novels by Felicia Gallant ===
Felicia has published at least 53 books, all gothic romance, except as noted.

- Beyond Paradise
- The Bride of Bombay
- The Bride of Waverly
- The Cannons of Newcastle
- Castle of Desire
- Damned by Desire
- The Daring Heart
- Doctor's Desire
- Driven to Passion
- Ebony Heartbeat
- Embers in the Snow (1985)
- Endless Journey
- Every Heart Knows
- Fallen Females
- Flames in the Night
- Forbidden Flower (1994, rejected)
- Forbidden Passion
- For the Love of Poppy
- Gardenias for Gwendolyn
- Gone with the Dawn (1983, first for Cory Publishing)
- Handmaiden's Heart
- The Heart That Heals (1996, contemporary)
- The Heart's Own Music
- Into the Fire (1994, semi-autobiographical)
- The Lady and the Laborer (1989)
- Liza
- Lock Out the Night
- Lonely and Unloved
- Love Beneath the Stars
- Love on the Moors
- Lust in the Kremlin (1980s)
- The Manly Heart
- The Mistress of Orleans
- Moonlight Desires (1983)
- My Finest Hour
- Paradise Delayed (1998)
- Passion's Progress (1983)
- The Pauper's Ransom
- The Rebel Princess
- Rive Gauche Serenade
- Rocky Mountain Miracle
- Sands of the Desert
- Sands of the Heart
- Savage Love (1983)
- Shimmering Love
- Sweet Captive
- Torrid Tundra Nights
- Untold Secrets
- Walking in the Light: The Story of Frankie Frame Winthrop (1997, biographical)
- White Snow in Hell
- Windblown Rose

== Reception ==
For the role as Felicia, Dano won the Daytime Emmy Award for Outstanding Lead Actress in a Drama Series in 1993. She was also nominated for Leading Actress Emmys in 1994 and 1996, and for Supporting Actress in 1992. A writer from Soap Opera Digest called Felicia a "flamboyant romance novelist" who had a "harrowing" battle with alcoholism.
