= Top-rated United States television programs of 1963–64 =

This table displays the top-rated primetime television series of the 1963–64 season as measured by Nielsen Media Research.

Rank	Program	Network	Rating
1	The Beverly Hillbillies	CBS	39.1
2	Bonanza	NBC	36.9
3	The Dick Van Dyke Show	CBS	33.3
4	Petticoat Junction	CBS	30.3
5	The Andy Griffith Show	CBS	29.4
6	The Lucy Show	CBS	28.1
7	Candid Camera	CBS	27.7
8	The Ed Sullivan Show	CBS	27.5
9	The Danny Thomas Show	CBS	26.7
10	My Favorite Martian	CBS	26.3
11	The Red Skelton Show	CBS	25.7
12	I've Got a Secret	CBS	25.0
12	Lassie	CBS	25.0
12	The Jack Benny Show	CBS	25.0
15	The Jackie Gleason Show	CBS	24.6
16	The Donna Reed Show	ABC	24.5
17	The Virginian	NBC	24.0
18	The Patty Duke Show	ABC	23.9
19	Dr. Kildare	NBC	23.6
20	Gunsmoke	CBS	23.5
21	Walt Disney's Wonderful World of Color	NBC	23.0
22	Hazel	NBC	22.8
22	McHale's Navy	ABC	22.8
24	To Tell the Truth	CBS	22.6
24	What's My Line?	CBS	22.6
26	Perry Mason	CBS	22.1
27	My Three Sons	ABC	21.9
28	The Fugitive	ABC	21.7
29	The Adventures of Ozzie and Harriet	ABC	21.6
30	The Danny Kaye Show	CBS	21.5
30	Bob Hope Presents the Chrysler Theatre	NBC	21.5
