= Jack Bannon (American actor) =

American actor (1940–2017)

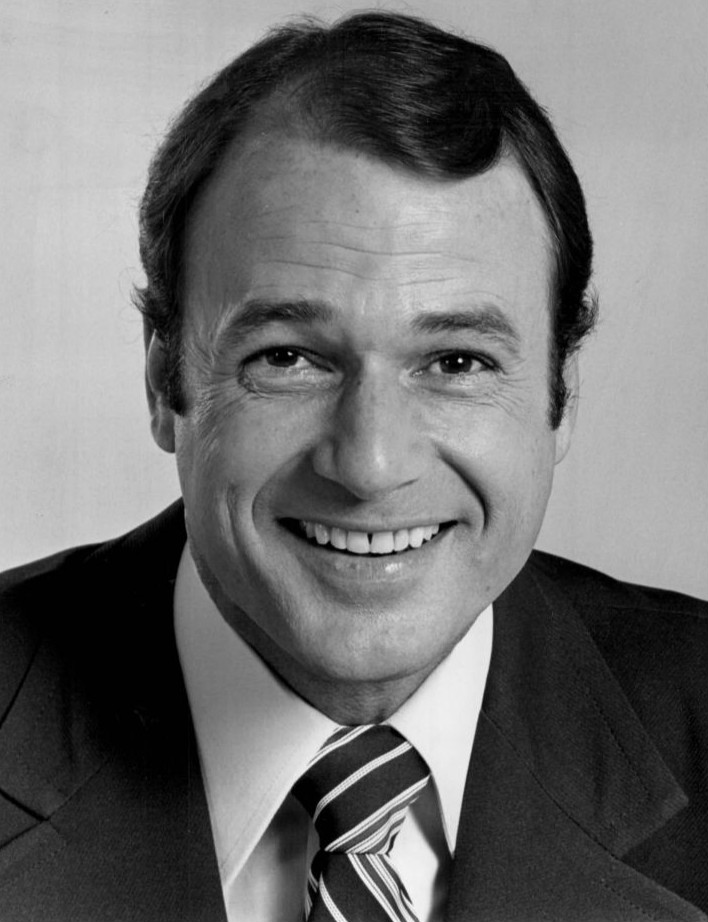
- Bannon in 1977
- Born: John James Bannon; June 14, 1940; Los Angeles, California, U.S.
- Died: October 25, 2017 (aged 77); Coeur d'Alene, Idaho, U.S.
- Education: University of California, Santa Barbara
- Occupation: Actor
- Years active: 1963–2006
- Spouses: Kathleen Larkin (m. 1969; div. 1973) Ellen Travolta (m. 1983)
- Parents: Jim Bannon; Bea Benaderet

John James Bannon (June 14, 1940 – October 25, 2017) was an American actor. He was best known for his role as Art Donovan on Lou Grant, a role he played for the duration of the series, from 1977 to 1982.

== Early life ==
Bannon was born on June 14, 1940, in Los Angeles, California. His parents were actors Jim Bannon and Bea Benaderet. He graduated from the University of California, Santa Barbara in 1963.

== Career ==
At age 24, Bannon began working as a dialog coach on Petticoat Junction, the sitcom on which his mother starred. In 1963, he appeared in the Season 1 episode "Kate's Recipe for Hot Rhubarb" of the series as Bobbie Joe's date, Roger. In 1969, Bannon was seen again on Petticoat Junction (after his mother died in 1968) appearing as Buck in the episode "One of Our Chickens Is Missing".

Bannon portrayed Buck Williams in the drama Trauma Center (1983). He also appeared in other television series of the 1960s, 1970s and 1980s, including The Beverly Hillbillies, Green Acres, Daniel Boone, Kojak, The Rockford Files, Charlie's Angels, and Simon & Simon.

Bannon's signature role was that of Art Donovan on Lou Grant. Bannon's obituary in The Hollywood Reporter described the character as an "amiable assistant editor" of the fictional Los Angeles Tribune newspaper. The actor appeared in all 114 episodes of the series.

The actor's film career included What Ever Happened to Aunt Alice? (1969), Little Big Man (1970), and Death Warrant (1990). On stage, he acted for 20 years in the Coeur d’Alene Summer Theatre company.

== Death ==
Bannon died on October 25, 2017, in Coeur d'Alene, Idaho, from cancer at the age of 77. He was survived by his wife, Ellen Travolta, an actress and elder sister of John Travolta; a sister; and two stepchildren.

== Filmography ==
Year	Title	Role	Notes
1969	What Ever Happened to Aunt Alice?	Olin	
1970	The Phynx	Blair Thompson	uncredited
1970	Little Big Man	Captain	
1986	Miracle of the Heart: A Boys Town Story	Father	
1986	Blacke's Magic	Dr. McCoy	Episode: Pilot "Breathing Room"
1990	Death Warrant	Ben Keane	
1993	Da Vinci's War	Arthur Jamieson	
1993	Distant Cousins	Bill Curtis	
1994	Hard Vice	Medical Examiner	
1995	To the Limit	Arthur Jameson	
1996	Navajo Blues	Captain Hansen	
1999	The Basket	Marcus	
2006	Waitin' to Live	Preacher	
2018	Mistrust	Nathan Dobier	Released Posthumously
