= John Aprea =

American actor (1941–2024)

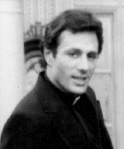
- Aprea in 1975
- Born: Jonathan Aprea; March 4, 1941; Englewood, New Jersey, U.S.
- Died: August 5, 2024 (aged 83); Los Angeles, California, U.S.
- Occupation: Actor
- Years active: 1968–2023
- Spouse(s): Cherie Latimer (m. 1966; div. 1971) Ninon Aprea (m. 1987; div. 1998) Betsey Graci (m. 2016)
- Children: 1

Jonathan Aprea (March 4, 1941 – August 5, 2024) was an American actor. He is known for playing the roles of young Salvatore Tessio in The Godfather Part II (1974), Lt. Vince Novelli on Matt Houston (1982 to 1984), Sheriff Jack North on Falcon Crest (1987), Manny Vasquez on Knots Landing (1988), Lucas Castigliano on Another World (1989 to 1992), and Nick Katsopolis on Full House (1988 to 1991) and Fuller House (2017). His other film credits include Bullitt (1968), The Stepford Wives (1975), New Jack City (1991), The Game (1997), and The Manchurian Candidate (2004).

== Early life ==
Aprea was born on March 4, 1941, in Englewood, New Jersey, where he was also raised. He graduated in 1959 from Dwight Morrow High School. His parents were Italian immigrants who were both from the region of Campania. His father was born in Sorrento and his mother was born in Castellammare di Stabia. While he was growing up, Aprea's family would have Sunday dinners with aunts and uncles who lived in Brooklyn and New Jersey. The family spoke the Neapolitan language.

In high school, Aprea played football as an All Bergen County tackle and linebacker. He worked in a produce store owned by his parents, California Market, located in Englewood. After graduation, he enrolled as a business major at Shippensburg University of Pennsylvania. Aprea decided to leave school when the dean wouldn't let him change his major to political science. He took jobs at gas stations and also worked as a truck driver.

== Career ==
=== 1960s–1974: Early work ===
Aprea always wanted to act, even though he described himself as a shy person. When he was twenty-three, he attended his first audition, after reading an ad in a local newspaper. He met with a man who said that he could have a part in a movie if he paid him a few thousand dollars. Aprea turned down the offer.

He told his sister about his dream to become an actor and she introduced him to television writer Saul Turteltaub. He helped Aprea enroll in acting classes taught by Joshua Shelley, who had worked with Jon Voight, Mia Farrow, and Michael J. Pollard. While attending school, he took night jobs, including working as a doorman at Schrafft's. He was a bartender at the Pub Room at Arthur, a nightclub that was owned by Sybil Christopher and frequented by many celebrities. Aprea eventually decided to leave New York to try other opportunities in Los Angeles.

He made his film debut as 'Dr. Kinner' in Bullitt (1968), co-starring with Steve McQueen. In 1970, he appeared in the films The Grasshopper and The Dark Side of Tomorrow. Aprea played Richard in the film Sweet Kill (1972), directed by Curtis Hanson. He guest starred on The F.B.I. in 1973. He also appeared in the film Caged Heat (1974), directed by Jonathan Demme.

=== 1974–1980: The Godfather Part II ===
While tending bar at Robert's in Los Angeles, Aprea met Francis Ford Coppola and landed an audition for the role of Michael Corleone in The Godfather. The part went to Al Pacino. Coppola eventually cast Aprea as young Salvatore Tessio in The Godfather Part II (1974). The part of the older Tessio was played by Abe Vigoda. All of Aprea's lines in the film were spoken in Italian. He called working on the movie "the high point" of his career.

In 1975, he appeared as a cop in the film The Stepford Wives. He also played Marvin in the film Crazy Mama, directed again by Jonathan Demme. Aprea had a regular role as Joseph Montefusco on the short-lived NBC comedy series The Montefuscos. He guest starred on The Rookies and Kate McShane.

Aprea played Mack in the television film The Rock Rainbow (1978). He also appeared in the television film A Guide for the Married Woman, co-starring with Cybill Shepherd. In 1979, Aprea guest starred on Wonder Woman, Mrs. Columbo, and A Man Called Sloane. He played Mario Vaccari in the film The Idolmaker (1980), directed by Taylor Hackford.

=== 1981–1987: Matt Houston ===
He appeared in the television film Crazy Times (1981), co-starring with Ray Liotta. Aprea was cast in a regular role as Albert Anastasia in the NBC miniseries The Gangster Chronicles. In 1982, he played a lawyer in the film Comeback. He guest starred on The Powers of Matthew Star. Aprea was cast as Lt. Vince Novelli on the ABC action series Matt Houston, playing the role from 1982 until 1984. In 1983, he played Ron in the film The Act.

In 1984, Aprea guest starred on Three's a Crowd and Mickey Spillane's Mike Hammer. He appeared in the television film Getting Physical. In 1985, he guest starred on Hardcastle and McCormick, Simon & Simon, Street Hawk, and The A-Team. He played Peter Shefland in the television pilot for the series Stingray.

Aprea played Mr. Tevere in the film American Anthem (1986). He guest starred on Alfred Hitchcock Presents and The Fall Guy. In 1987, Aprea played Frank in the television film Blood Vows: The Story of a Mafia Wife, co-starring with Melissa Gilbert. He had a recurring role as Sheriff Jack North on the CBS series Falcon Crest.

=== 1988–1993: Another World ===
Aprea played Salazar in the action film Picasso Trigger (1988). He guest starred on Tales from the Darkside. He had a recurring role as Manny Vasquez on the CBS series Knots Landing. Aprea received a Soap Opera Digest Award nomination for Outstanding Villain – Prime Time for his work on Knots Landing.

From 1988 to 1989, he played the recurring role of Nick Katsopolis, the father of Jesse (John Stamos), on the ABC sitcom Full House. He also appeared on the show in 1991. Aprea played Captain Andreas in the action film Savage Beach (1989). He guest starred on Father Dowling Mysteries and Night Court. In 1989, Aprea was cast on the NBC soap opera Another World, playing Lucas Castigliano. The character of Lucas was paired with Felicia Gallant (Linda Dano). He had previously worked with Dano when they played siblings on The Montefuscos.

Aprea played Don Armeteo in the film New Jack City (1991), directed by Mario Van Peebles. In 1992, he left Another World when his contract came to an end. The character of Lucas was killed off. In 1993, Aprea guest starred on The Hat Squad, Dark Justice, Melrose Place, Saved by the Bell: The New Class, and Silk Stalkings.

=== 1994–2024 ===
He played Senator Dilly in the science fiction film CyberTracker (1994). He also appeared in the action film Direct Hit. From 1994 to 1995, Aprea guest starred on Heaven Help Us, Renegade, and Silk Stalkings. He played Philly Bambino in the action film To the Limit (1995), co-starring with Anna Nicole Smith. Aprea played Dominic in the film Sunset Park (1996).

He appeared in the film The Game (1997), directed by David Fincher. He also appeared in the films My Brother Jack, Deadly Ransom, and Dead Man on Campus. Aprea returned to Another World, playing a new character, Alexander Nikos, from 1997 to 1998. From 1998 to 2000, he guest starred on Vengeance Unlimited, Pacific Blue, The Sopranos, and The District.

Aprea played Mafia Boss Geppetti in the film Brother (2000). From 2001 to 2002, he had a recurring role on Philly. He appeared in the film The Streetsweeper (2002). In 2004, Aprea played Rear Admiral Glick in the film The Manchurian Candidate, co-starring with Denzel Washington and directed by Jonathan Demme. He guest starred on NYPD Blue in 2005. He played Mark McPhillips in the television film Mystery Woman: At First Sight (2006).

From 2009 to 2010, Aprea guest starred on Cold Case and Lie to Me. He played Sollie in the film Dirty People (2012). He guest starred on CSI: Crime Scene Investigation in 2013. He also played Jerry Masselin in the film After You. Mr. Aprea was recruited to appear on the First Annual On Cinema At the Cinema Oscar Special in 2013. This role would later lead to Aprea appearing as General Cotter/General Cotter Clone in the hit series Decker. Aprea starred as Mike Esposito in the film Sharkskin (2015). He played Angelo in the film Stevie D (2016). In 2017, he guest starred as Nick Katsopolis on Fuller House, a revival of Full House. Aprea appeared in the film Lost Angelas (2019). From 2020 to 2023, he had a recurring role on The Bay.

== Personal life and death ==
In the late 1960s, Aprea married actress Cherie Latimer. They later divorced.

He married actress Ninon Aprea (then known as Ninon Zenovich) on December 31, 1987. Their daughter was born in 1989. They divorced in October 1998, and Aprea later married Betsey Graci.

Aprea died of natural causes at his home in Los Angeles on August 5, 2024, at the age of 83.

== Filmography ==
=== Film ===
Year	Title	Role	Notes
1968	Bullitt	Killer	
1970	The Grasshopper	The Ice Pack	
1970	The Dark Side of Tomorrow	Jim Jeffers	
1972	Sweet Kill	Richard	
1973	The Seven-Ups	Killer	Uncredited
1974	Caged Heat	Dream Man	
1974	The Godfather Part II	Young Salvatore Tessio	
1975	The Stepford Wives	Young Cop	
1975	Crazy Mama	Marvin	
1980	The Idolmaker	Mario Vaccari	
1982	Comeback	Lawyer	
1983	The Act	Ron	
1986	American Anthem	Mr. Tevere	
1988	Picasso Trigger	Salazar	
1989	Savage Beach	Captain Andreas	
1991	New Jack City	Don Armeteo	
1992	Confessions of a Male Prostitute	Nick	Short film
1994	Direct Hit	Terry Daniels	Video
1994	CyberTracker	Senator Dilly	
1995	To the Limit	Philly Bambino	
1996	Sunset Park	Dominic	
1997	The Game	Power Executive	
1997	My Brother Jack	Barry Freed	
1998	Deadly Ransom	Mr. Merlin	
1998	Dead Man on Campus	Mr. Frederickson	
2000	Brother	Mafia Boss Geppetti	
2002	The Streetsweeper		
2004	The Manchurian Candidate	Rear Admiral Glick	
2012	Dirty People	Sollie	
2013	After You	Jerry Masselin	
2014	Snapshot	Joseph Simmons	
2015	Sharkskin	Mike Esposito	
2016	Stevie D	Angelo DiMarco	
2017	Dark Image	Alex Ricci	
2019	Lost Angelas	Senator John Russell	
2019	Space Junk	Dad	Short film
2021	Cold	Daniel Woods	

=== Television ===
Year	Title	Role	Notes
1969	That Girl	Frank	Episode: "Shake Hands and Come Out Acting"
1970	Mannix	Thug	Episode: "Murder Revisited" (Uncredited)
1973	The F.B.I.	1st Thug	Episode: "Night of the Long Knives"
1975	The Montefuscos	Joseph Montefusco	Main role
1975	Kate McShane		Episode: "God at $15,732 a Year"
1975	The Rookies	Phil Richards	Episode: "Shadow of a Man"
1978	The Rock Rainbow	Mack	Television film
1978	A Guide for the Married Woman	Waiter	Television film
1978	Fix-It City	Joey Bellino	Television film
1979	Wonder Woman	Dupris	Episode: "The Man Who Could Not Die"
1979	Mrs. Columbo	Phil Stoppard	Episode: "Ladies of the Afternoon"
1979	A Man Called Sloane	Harry Helms	Episode: "Architect of Evil"
1981	Crazy Times	Ralph	Television film
1981	The Gangster Chronicles	Albert Anastasia	Miniseries
1982	The Powers of Matthew Star	Howard Crawford	Episode: "The Accused"
1982–1984	Matt Houston	Lt. Vince Novelli	Main role
1984	Getting Physical	Craig Cawley	Television film
1984	Three's a Crowd	Armando	Episode: "Maternal Triangle"
1984	Mickey Spillane's Mike Hammer	Matt Rainey	Episode: "Catfight"
1985	Hardcastle and McCormick		Episode: "What's So Funny?"
1985	Simon & Simon	Sidney Gretchen	Episode: "The Mickey Mouse Mob"
1985	Street Hawk	Dumos	Episode: "Follow the Yellow Gold Road"
1985	Stingray	Peter Shefland	Television film (pilot)
1985	The A-Team	Woody Stone	Episode: "There Goes the Neighborhood"
1986	Alfred Hitchcock Presents	Fisher	Episode: "A Very Happy Ending"
1986	The Fall Guy	Joe Bradley	Episode: "I Now Pronounce You...Dead"
1987	Blood Vows: The Story of a Mafia Wife	Frank	Television film
1987	Private Eye	Larry Robbins	Episode: "Blue Movie"
1987	Falcon Crest	Sheriff Jack North	Recurring role
1988	Tales from the Darkside	Lee	Episode: "Going Native"
1988	Knots Landing	Manny Vasquez	Recurring role
1988–1989 & 1991	Full House	Nick Katsopolis	Recurring role
1989	Father Dowling Mysteries	Peter Luciani	Episodes: "The Mafia Priest Mystery Part 1 & Part 2"
1989	Night Court	Marty Cologne	Episode: "From Snoop to Nuts Part 1"
1989–1992 & 1997–1998	Another World	Lucas Castigliano/Alexander Nikos	Contract role
1993	The Hat Squad	Stevenson	Episode: "Dead Man Walking"
1993	Dark Justice		Episode: "Clean Kill"
1993	Melrose Place	John Bryant	Episode: "Of Bikes and Men"
1993	Saved by the Bell: The New Class	Mr. De Luca	Episode: "Tommy A"
1993 & 1995	Silk Stalkings	Ross Simon/Frank Danner	Episodes: "Daddy Dearest" & "Friendly Persuasion"
1994	Heaven Help Us	Det. Walker	Episode: "Stepping Out"
1995	Renegade	Vino Borelli	Episode: "Den of Thieves"
1998	Vengeance Unlimited		Episode: "Ambition"
1999	Pacific Blue	Sonny Sorrento	Episode: "Thicker Than Water"
1999	The Sopranos	U.S. Attorney	Episode: "I Dream of Jeannie Cusamano"
1999 & 2012	Days of Our Lives	Arthur/Dr. Bryce	Recurring role
2000	The District	Chief of Detectives	Episode: "Dirty Laundry"
2001–2002	Philly	Victor Tommasino	Episodes: "Blown Away" & "San Diego Padre"
2005	NYPD Blue	Owen Munson	Episode: "Old Man Quiver"
2006	Mystery Woman: At First Sight	Mark McPhillips	Television film
2007	American Heiress	Lionel Wakefield	Main role
2009	Cold Case	Paul Romano '09	Episode: "Libertyville"
2010	Lie to Me	Victor Musso	Episode: "The Whole Truth"
2011	The Christmas Pageant	Herb	Television film
2012	Interglobal Trading Fund	Howard	Short
2013	CSI: Crime Scene Investigation	Pit Boss	Episode: "Take the Money and Run"
2016–2017	Decker	General Cotter/General Cotter Clone	Recurring role
2017	Drive Share	Frank's Dad	Episode: "Balls Deep"
2017	Fuller House	Nick Katsopolis	Episode: "Wedding or Not Here We Come"
2020–2023	The Bay	Jack Madison	Recurring role
