= Ron Carey (actor) =

American actor (1935-2007)

- Carey in Barney Miller, 1978
- Born: Ronald Joseph Cicenia; December 11, 1935; Newark, New Jersey, U.S.
- Died: January 16, 2007 (aged 71); Los Angeles, California, U.S.
- Occupation: Actor
- Years active: 1966–1999
- Spouse: Sharon Boyeronus (m. 1968)

Ronald Joseph Cicenia (December 11, 1935 – January 16, 2007), better known as Ron Carey, was an American film and television actor. The 5-foot-4-inch (1.63 m) actor was best known for playing ambitious NYPD Police Officer Carl Levitt on TV's Barney Miller, in which he was almost always surrounded by male actors (and sometimes female guest stars) who stood at least 8 inches (20 cm) taller. The series' stars (Hal Linden, Max Gail, Abe Vigoda, Ron Glass, Steve Landesberg) all stood 6 feet (1.83 m) or more. Carey appeared in the recurring role for the last six of the eight seasons of Barney Miller's run. He first appeared on the show as a criminal, Angelo Molinari (aka The Mole), in season 2, episode 22.

Carey was among the slate of actors who were members of Mel Brooks's unofficial repertory company, appearing in several of the director's films; Carey was featured in Silent Movie, High Anxiety, and History of the World: Part I. He also appeared in Fatso, directed by Brooks' wife Anne Bancroft and featuring several Brooks regulars.

== Life and career ==
Carey was born in Newark, New Jersey, the son of Fanny Nesto Cicenia (1904-1988) and John Cicenia (1902-1971), and was raised in an Italian American Catholic family. He attended Barringer High School, where he was class president in his senior year. Carey did stand-up comedy in the 1960s, after earning a bachelor's degree in communications from Seton Hall University in 1956. His comedy centered mostly on Catholicism and his childhood of being the undersized but quick-witted kid on the block. His break came in 1966 when he appeared on The Merv Griffin Show and in 1967 he released a comedy album entitled The Slightly Irreverent Comedy of Ron Carey.

From the mid-1970s on, Carey was a member of Mel Brooks' comedy troupe, appearing in featured roles in films such as High Anxiety, Silent Movie, and History of the World, Part I. He also appeared in supporting roles in other films and on television, and was seen in scores of commercials, including some T-shirt ads for Hanes, an ad for Nabisco's snack cracker Better Cheddars, where he sang, and a Post Honeycomb ad, in which he played a character named Mr. Big who came to the Honeycomb Hideout looking for a cereal with "a big, big bite." He is most remembered for his role as the diligent but somewhat obsequious and passive-aggressive Officer Carl Levitt, which he played from 1976 to 1982 on the TV series Barney Miller.

Carey died of a stroke at Cedars-Sinai Medical Center in Los Angeles, California, in January 2007. He is survived by his wife of 38 years, Sharon, and his brother, James Cicenia. Carey did not have any children. His burial details are currently unknown.

== Filmography ==
Year	Title	Role	Notes
1970	The Out-of-Towners	Cab Driver - Boston	
1971	Who Killed Mary What's 'Er Name?	Larry the Bartender	
1971	Made for Each Other	Group Member #1	
1971	Dynamite Chicken	Himself	
1971	NBC Children's Theater		episode: “Super Plastic Elastic Goggles"
1973	The Corner Bar	Donald Hooten	TV series, 6 episodes
1975	The Montefuscos	Frank Montefusco	TV series, 9 episodes
1976	Silent Movie	Devour	
1976–1982	Barney Miller	Officer Carl Levitt / Angelo Molinari aka The Mole	TV series, 121 episodes
1977	High Anxiety	Brophy	
1979	$weepstake$	Donnihue	TV series, episode "Roscoe, Elizabeth, and the M.C."
1980	Fatso	Frankie	
1981	History of the World: Part I	Swiftus	
1982	Benson	Nash	season 4 episodes 1 & 2
1984	Johnny Dangerously	Pat	
1989	Have Faith	Father Vincent Paglia	TV series, 7 episodes
1991	Lucky Luke	Joe Dalton	
1994	Troublemakers	Sheriff Fox	
1997	The Good Bad Guy	Robert Lambert	
1999	Food for Thought	Business Man	Short, (final film role)
