= List of The Beverly Hillbillies episodes =

The Beverly Hillbillies is an American sitcom that aired on CBS from September 26, 1962, to March 23, 1971. Originally filmed in black and white for the first three seasons (1962–1965), the first color-filmed episode ("Admiral Jed Clampett") was aired on September 15, 1965, and all subsequent episodes from 1965 to 1971 were filmed in color. During its nine-season run, 274 episodes aired—106 in black-and-white, 168 in color. In its first two seasons, The Beverly Hillbillies was the No. 1 television program.

== Series overview ==
Season	Episodes	Originally released		Rank	Rating
Season	Episodes	First released	Last released	Rank	Rating
1	36	September 26, 1962	May 29, 1963	1	36.0
2	36	September 25, 1963	June 10, 1964	1	39.1
3	34	September 23, 1964	June 9, 1965	12	25.6
4	32	September 15, 1965	May 18, 1966	7	25.9
5	30	September 14, 1966	April 19, 1967	7	23.4
6	30	September 6, 1967	April 3, 1968	12	23.3
7	26	September 25, 1968	March 26, 1969	10	23.5
8	26	September 24, 1969	March 18, 1970	18	21.7
9	24	September 15, 1970	March 23, 1971	—N/a	—N/a

== Episodes ==
=== Season 1 (1962–63) ===
All episodes in black-and-white

No. overall	No. in season	Title	Directed by	Written by	Original release date	Prod. code
1	1	"The Clampetts Strike Oil"	Ralph Levy	Paul Henning	September 26, 1962	1–1
The pilot starts after the theme song when Jed struck oil in his Lake. A rural Ozark family relocates to Beverly Hills after oil is discovered on their property worth $25 million. Elly May (Donna Douglas) brings a Geologist (Ron Hagerthy) back to the cabin. He tells Jed that there's oil on his land and he leaves for Tulsa. Later, Cousin Pearl (Bea Benaderet) and her son Jethro (Max Baer Jr.) arrive. Jed tells Pearl that a Mr. Brewster (Frank Wilcox) of the OK Oil Company offered to buy his land. Pearl tries to explain to Jed that he is now a rich man. She tells him that he should move to Beverly Hills. Mr. Brewster comes by and also says Beverly Hills would be a nice place to live. He could have a bank out there find a home for Jed. The family and Jethro drive out to California. Jed's $25 million has been deposited in the Commerce Bank of Beverly Hills. Bank President Milburn Drysdale (Raymond Bailey) buys the mansion next to his for the Clampetts. The Clampetts arrive at their mansion. They mistake their new home for a prison and the groundskeepers for prisoners. The family is arrested because of a case of mistaken identity. After he realizes who they are, Drysdale has the family released from jail. Drysdale drives them back to the mansion, but still thinking it is a prison, the family runs away. Also guest-starring Robert Osborne as Jeff Taylor. Note: Home media releases also include an alternative, unaired version of the pilot entitled "The Hillbillies of Beverly Hills".
2	2	"Getting Settled"	Richard Whorf	Paul Henning	October 3, 1962	1–2
Mr. Drysdale shows the Clampetts the inside of their mansion. Drysdale says that Miss Jane Hathaway (Nancy Kulp), his executive secretary, will come by to help with hiring of the staff. Jethro asks Jed when he can taste Granny's moonshine and Jed says on his wedding day. Elly sees a telephone pole and thinks it can be used for fire wood. Elly and Jethro have a scuffle and she pins him down. Jed has a talk with Elly about acting and dressing more like a lady. Jed says he raised her like a boy and he's sorry he did. The Clampetts have to adjust to things such as refrigerators, ovens and the "cement pond" (swimming pool). Jethro also encounters a flamingo that he thinks is a chicken and tries describing it to the family. This causes Jed to suspect Jethro has been sneaking drinks of moonshine. Miss Jane arrives and thinks Elly is part of the "domestic" help. Jed and Jethro mistake a croquet ball for an egg. Miss Jane thinks Jed is the gardener, Granny the cook and Jethro the chauffeur. Things get confusing and Miss Jane tries to fire them. Drysdale comes by and explains to her that they are the Clampetts.
3	3	"Meanwhile, Back at the Cabin"	Richard Whorf	Paul Henning	October 10, 1962	1–3
Jed tells Mr. Drysdale that Cousin Pearl is taking care of his old cabin. Back at the cabin, Mr.Brewster tells Pearl that everyone arrived in Beverly Hills. He shows Pearl pictures of the mansion. Because she can't find a pump in the house, Granny thinks the only water they have is in the cement pond. Mr. Brewster offers to drive Pearl to the nearest phone so she can call Jed. During the drive, Pearl keeps trying to gain the attention of Mr. Brewster. Miss Jane comes by the mansion and finds Elly taking a bath in a wooden tub. Miss Jane tries to tell Granny that there are bath tubs upstairs. Granny says that they figured the upstairs belonged to someone else. Jethro tells Jed about his experience with a girl back in the hills. Jed is surprised when the story is more about cookies than anything else. Elly won't wear any of the clothes that Miss Jane brought. She thinks that a brassiere is a slingshot. Jed thinks that he's found a lot of water under his front lawn, not knowing that there is a sprinkler system there.
4	4	"The Clampetts Meet Mrs. Drysdale"	Richard Whorf	Paul Henning	October 17, 1962	1–4
Due to a misunderstanding of something Mr. Drysdale said, Jed believes Mrs. Drysdale (Harriet MacGibbon) is a drinking woman. Margaret Drysdale is in Boston hoping to get cured of her ailment, but the doctors insist there's nothing wrong with her. Something Drysdale tells Granny reinforces the notion that Margaret is a drunk. Drysdale is at the Clampetts showing them how to use the phone when Margaret calls there. She has learned that the Clampetts have moved in next door to her and she wants to meet them to make sure they are the right type of people. Milburn tells her to stay in Boston. Miss Jane tells Drysdale that Margaret is on her way home. He sets Miss Jane on a plan to get them to go to Palm Springs for a few days. Elly is wearing a bathing suit and Jed and Granny are surprised at how small it is. Miss Jane suggests that Elly enter a "Princess of Palm Springs" beauty contest. Miss Jane lets it slip that Milburn wants them to go to Palm Springs so Margaret doesn't meet them yet. As a favor to Drysdale, they will go. Thinking the Clampetts are gone, Milburn arrives at the mansion with Margaret. She sees Jethro with a shot gun and faints. Jed and Granny see her passed out in the car and think she's drunk.
5	5	"Jed Buys Stock"	Richard Whorf	Paul Henning	October 24, 1962	1–5
Jed tells Jethro and Elly that they think Mrs. Drysdale is a heavy drinker. Meanwhile, Miss Jane tells Drysdale that the Clampetts have still agreed to go to Palm Springs. That will give him time to send Margaret back to Boston. Upon Mr. Drysdale's advice to buy good stock, Jed wants to purchase cows, pigs, and chickens to raise. Jed tries to buy the animals over the phone. Jed does get the animals and keeps them in the tennis court. Granny prepares her special mash to help cure Mrs. Drysdale of her drinking problem. Granny and Elly give the mash to a confused Ravenswood (Arthur Gould-Porter), the Drysdale's butler. Marie (Sirry Steffen), the Drysdale's maid, gives the mash to Milburn. Drysdale hears the animals and races over to the Clampetts. Drysdale tries to keep Margaret from hearing the animals. The Clampetts try to get some goat's milk to Margaret, because she's supposed to have that after the mash. Mrs. Drysdale is convinced she's imagining things, because she sees Granny hovering outside her window and sees a goat and a chicken in her bathroom. She decides to see the doctors in Boston.
6	6	"Trick or Treat"	Richard Whorf	Paul Henning	October 31, 1962	1–6
Jed tells Jethro that he invited his mother Pearl and his sister Jethrine (Max Baer Jr., voiced by Linda Kaye Henning) to come for a visit. Granny believes Pearl is too busy trying to win over Mr. John Brewster to come and visit. Back in the hills, Pearl introduces Jethrine to John and keeps flirting with him. Granny wants to go home because folks are so unfriendly and no one has come to call. Jed wants to stay because Elly wore a dress today and he thinks Beverly Hills is good for her. Elly comes home with her dress all muddied up. She says because it was a ball gown, she went and played football with some boys. Back in the hills, John asks Pearl if she's going to visit Jed. Pearl, because she wants to stay with him, tells John she's so busy here. Wanting to find a man for Jethrine, Pearl asks John about the single men that are working for him. Jasper 'Jazzbo' Depew (Phil Gordon) drives up and starts talking to Jethrine. He wants to sell her a French Garter, but she misunderstands and carries him off. Jed convinces Granny that they should call on their neighbors. The first house they visit, Governess Agnes (Shirley Mitchell) invites them in. The Clampetts don't know it is Halloween and Agnes thinks they're trick or treating as hillbillies. She gives them some treats. Granny and Jed see the two children of the house in their costumes. They feel bad because the children are so ugly. The Clampetts visit several more homes and find that people welcome them and give them all manner of gifts. Also guest-starring Teddy Eccles as Little Boy.
7	7	"The Servants"	Richard Whorf	Paul Henning	November 7, 1962	1–7
Jed and Granny would like to see Elly wear some of the dresses that Miss Jane got her. She'll do it, but says Jethro better not make fun of her. Jethro does and Elly tackles him. Meanwhile, Drysdale would like to get the Clampetts used to having some servants. Drysdale talks Jed into taking in his butler Ravenswood and upstairs girl Marie as a favor. Jed and Granny believe that Ravenswood is Margaret's relative and that Marie is her daughter. When Ravenswood sees Jethro again, he runs away and Drysdale goes after him. Miss Jane introduces Marie and learns that Granny's last name is Moses. Miss Jane has a plan to get the Clampetts used to city clothes by painting a portrait of them. Something Jed says about Ravenswood makes Granny think she's an unwanted relative. When Ravenswood sees Elly in a dress and calls her a beautiful city girl, Elly takes it as an insult and starts to chase him.
8	8	"Jethro Goes to School"	Richard Whorf	Paul Henning	November 14, 1962	1–8
The Clampetts get a letter from Pearl. She asks if Jethro is in school yet. Back in the hills, Pearl continues to pursue Mr. Brewster. She tells him that one of his employees, Jasper Depew, has made advances towards Jethrine. Brewster says he has no one with that name working for him. Jasper comes by, sings to Jethrine and she carrys him away. Back at the mansion, Jed says he needs to get Jethro in school. He hopes to enroll Jethro at an exclusive Beverly Hills elementary school. When the headmistress, Mrs. Millicent Schuyler-Potts (Eleanor Audley), sees Jed and Jethro, she thinks someone is playing a practical joke on her. And she also doesn't realize that Jethro is who Jed wants to enroll. Jed tells her he's a neighbor of Mr. Drysdale. After calling Drysdale, who holds the mortgage on the school, she finds out Jed is rich and she warms up to the idea of enrolling a Clampett boy. Millicent gives Jed a little boys uniform for Jethro to wear. There is a bit of a shock when Millicent comes by to pick up Jethro the next day and realizes who will be her new fifth grader. Also guest-starring Lisa Davis as Diana.
9	9	"Elly's First Date"	Richard Whorf	Paul Henning	November 21, 1962	1–9
Mr. Drysdale has told Jed that Margaret's son, Sonny Drysdale (Louis Nye), will be courting Elly. Sonny tells his mother that he won't do it. But then he sees Elly by the pool and sees how pretty she is. Meanwhile, Jed tries to explain courting to Elly. Granny tells Jed about her experience grocery shopping for Thanksgiving. Sonny drives up to the Clampett mansion and parks next to their truck. He asks Jethro to move the truck because it spoils the look of his car. Jethro thinks he's talking about Sonny's car and Jed helps him move it away. Sonny gives Elly a present. She thinks it is going to be candy, but it turns out to be a picture of Sonny. Sonny goes to kiss Elly's hand. She thinks he's going to bite her and she flips him over. He leaves and when he can't find his car, he goes running home screaming for his mother. Granny wants to start feuding with the Drysdales. In an attempt to smooth things over, Jed invites the Drysdales for Thanksgiving.
10	10	"Pygmalion and Elly"	Richard Whorf	Paul Henning	November 28, 1962	1–10
Jed is not happy about Granny wanting to cut his hair. Sonny continues to court Elly by playing Julius Caesar. Elly misunderstands something Sonny says and pushes him into the pool. Sonny decides he needs to be Pygmalion to Elly's Galatea and remake her from a hillbilly into a woman of society. Miss Jane comes by the mansion and Jed tells her that Granny is going to make a love charm for Elly. Miss Jane believes that charms are just superstition. Sonny comes by and tries to teach Elly some etiquette. Jed is watching from another room and thinks there's something wrong with Sonny. Granny gives Miss Jane a love charm and when Jethro shows up, Jane thinks it worked. Granny thinks that Elly's love charm was too strong and tries to give Sonny an antidote. Later, Granny gives Jed a love charm. Mrs. Drysdale is looking for Sonny. Jed and Granny misunderstand and think that Margaret is after Jed. Sonny comes out dressed as a hillbilly.
11	11	"Elly Races Jethrine"	Richard Whorf	Paul Henning	December 5, 1962	1–11
When Sonny says he'll give Elly a ring tomorrow, Granny thinks he's going to propose. Sonny actually meant he'd call Elly. Jed thinks Elly will beat Jethrine to the altar. Meanwhile, Pearl sees pictures of Elly and Sonny that Jed had sent her. Pearl wonders why things haven't progressed further between Jethrine and Jasper Depew. Sonny comes by to take Elly for a drive. Back in Sonny's room, he's trying to court Elly, but she isn't quite understanding. Jethrine is nervous about Jasper coming over. Pearl gives her some elderberry wine to calm her down. Jasper comes over and Jethrine just sits there while he plays the pump organ. It is getting late and Granny wonders what's going on with Elly and Sonny. The two show up and Sonny again says he'll give Elly a ring in the morning. Jed has a talk about marriage with Elly. Granny talks to Sonny and he mentions that Elly can't dance. Jasper wants to dance with Jethrine, but she's in a daze from the wine. Back at the mansion, Jed, Granny, Elly and Sonny are square dancing. Jethro asks why they're dancing and Granny says they're celebrating Elly marrying Sonny. Sonny runs home screaming for his mother.
12	12	"The Great Feud"	Richard Whorf	Paul Henning & Phil Shuken	December 12, 1962	1–12
The Clampett clan takes great offense when Sonny jilts Elly, and they want to start a feud with the Drysdales to avenge their kinfolk's honor. Jed and Jethro drive to the Commerce Bank. Jethro brought a shot gun with him, but Jed takes it away. Jed brings the gun with him into the bank. Everyone thinks he's a robber and he gets arrested. Granny thinks the Drysdales took Jed, so she decides to take one of the Drysdales. When they get to the house, Jethro tries to take Marie the maid. Granny takes Ravenswood instead. At the jail, two psychiatrists (Lyle Talbot and Ken Drake) are interviewing Jed. The men have a confusing conversation with Jed. Drysdale and Miss Jane arrive at the jail. When Drysdale tells the men Jed has 25 million in his bank, the psychiatrists think Drysdale is crazy. Drysdale does get Jed freed and Jed tells him about Sonny. Drysdale says he will get Sonny to propose. Drysdale, Miss Jane and Jed arrive at the Clampetts' gate and Granny starts shooting. The three go to Drysdale's mansion. Things eventually get straightened out when Elly says she doesn't want to marry Sonny.
13	13	"Home for Christmas"	Richard Whorf	Paul Henning & Phil Shuken	December 19, 1962	1–13
The Clampetts plan to drive back to the cabin for Christmas. Drysdale arranges for them to take their first plane flight back home. They think the plane is a large bus. They're surprised when the plane leaves the ground. Meanwhile, back at in the hills, Homer Winch (Paul Winchell), a man who has desires for Pearl, comes to her house. He mentions that Mr. Brewster is at Jed's cabin. Pearl goes to see Brewster and cooks up a feast for him. She then proceeds to spruce up the cabin. Mr. Brewster insults Pearl when he asks her to be his housekeeper in Tulsa, while she thought it was going to be a proposal. She says she's going to visit Jed for Christmas and tell Jed how he misled her. The Clampetts are sleeping on the plane and the stewardesses start showing a cowboy film. They wake up and think they're on the ground chasing the cowboys. Drysdale calls Brewster and tells him he needs to keep Pearl there so as not to spoil Jed's Christmas surprise. Brewster goes to see Pearl and tries to keep her at home without leading her on. Just then the Clampetts show up. Everyone sings Christmas carols. Also guest-starring Eilene Janssen as First Airline Stewardess.
14	14	"No Place Like Home"	Richard Whorf	Paul Henning & Phil Shuken	December 26, 1962	1–14
The Clampetts are back at their old cabin. Jed tells John Brewster how his Grandfather built the cabin. While the Clampetts are staying in the cabin, Mr. Brewster needs a place to stay. Pearl finds a way to have him stay at her place. Elly May bonds with her old animal friends. Jed tells Elly that they're going to Pearl's for dinner. Then they'll go to the movie house where Pearl will play the piano for the "new" movie in town (the silent version of Ben Hur). Before the movie is to start, Pearl introduces John to the audience. A jealous Homer Winch tries to throw a tomato at John but hits the movie screen. Pearl then introduces the Clampetts and Granny shows off her mink coat. The advertisements before the movie are about Pearl and then a wedding chapel. Pearl looks at John and makes him uneasy. After the movie when the lights come up, they notice that Mr. Brewster is gone. Homer declares his love for Pearl and asks her to marry him. Jethrine comes in carrying Brewster and he denies trying to sneak out. The next morning, Granny says she wants to go back to Beverly Hills because she had to share the bed with Elly and her critters. And a mother eagle took Granny's mink for her nest.
15	15	"Jed Rescues Pearl"	Richard Whorf	Paul Henning & Phil Shuken	January 2, 1963	1–15
Jethro wants to go back to the mansion. Jed says they have to stay until Pearl wins over John Brewster. Meanwhile, Pearl sings for John and he tells her he used to do some acting when he was younger. He performs a piece from Romeo and Juliet. The next morning Pearl comes by the Clampett cabin crying. She didn't get John to propose to her. John tells Jed that he doesn't want to get married, but the whole county knows that Cousin Pearl had her heart set for him. Jed comes up with a plan for her to save face by having Mr. Brewster propose in public and then have her turn him down. And they have to make Elverna Bradshaw (Elvia Allman) believe it. John thinks they should do it in the town theater. Elverna comes by Pearl's house and gives her a hard time about Mr. Brewster. That night, everyone is at the theater. John makes his entrance. Jed didn't count on Mr. Brewster's background in acting and him making a huge production out of the proposal. Mr. Brewster does such a convincing job that Pearl, after repeatedly saying no, then says yes.
16	16	"Back to Californy"	Richard Whorf	Paul Henning & Phil Shuken	January 9, 1963	1–16
The Clampetts pack up to return to Beverly Hills. Jed tells Mr. Brewster that Pearl and Jethrine are coming with for a visit. Jed finds Elly saying goodbye to her critters. Meanwhile, Pearl finds that Jethrine has packed Jazzbo Depew in a large trunk to take with her. Jazzbo tries to explain to Jethrine that he can't leave his business now. Mr. Brewster comes by and thanks Pearl for breaking off their engagement. Back in Beverly Hills, Miss Jane dresses the vamp to meet Jethro at the airport. Drysdale welcomes the family at the airport. Jethro doesn't recognize Miss Jane and she pretends to be a Gypsy woman. At the mansion, Pearl annoys Granny with her talk about things needing cleaning around the place. Pearl does other things to annoy Granny. Jethro and Miss Jane arrive. The feuding starts between Granny and Pearl over who's running Granny's kitchen. Also guest-starring Gloria Marshall as Airline Hostess.
17	17	"Jed's Dilemma"	Richard Whorf	Paul Henning & Phil Shuken	January 16, 1963	1–17
Granny and Cousin Pearl are at each other's throats over who's going to take care of cooking and the house. Jethrine is singing and Granny tells Pearl she sounds like she's sick. Jed tries to calm things down by taking the family on a sightseeing tour of Beverly Hills. But the truck is out of gas. Jed puts some of Granny's moonshine in the truck just so they can get to a gas station. While driving around town, Granny continues to insult Pearl. They drive past a silent movie theater with some wax figurines outside. They think the figurines are real movie stars. Back at the mansion, Granny and Pearl fight over who's going to prepare some food. Jed tries to get the two to make up, but it doesn't work. Jed suggests Pearl go swimming with Elly and Jethro. There's a barbecue grill by the pool and Pearl wants to do some cooking. Meanwhile, Jed and Jethrine sing Dixie, then Jed does some dancing. Granny finishes cooking some food, but everyone has already eaten Pearl's food. Granny pushes Pearl and the grill into the pool.
18	18	"Jed Saves Drysdale's Marriage"	Richard Whorf	Paul Henning & Phil Shuken	January 23, 1963	1–18
Granny and Pearl are still fighting. Jed tries to convince Pearl that with her talent for yodeling and piano playing she should be trying to get a man instead of wasting time in the kitchen. Jed tells Pearl how much Mr. Drysdale enjoyed her singing when he was over for dinner. Drysdale tells Miss Jane how annoying Pearl's yodeling is. Margaret wants to go to a health farm saying Milburn is "going to have a new wife" when she returns. Miss Jane suggests that Drysdale hire Pearl to be his housekeeper while Margaret is away. When Drysdale asks Pearl to take care of his house, she thinks he's interested in her. As she's leaving, Margaret tells Jed and Granny that Milburn will soon have a new wife. The Clampetts now think that Drysdale wants to marry Pearl. Jed tells Pearl that Drysdale is married. Jed talks to Drysdale and because of a misunderstanding, Jed believes he'd even be willing to marry Granny. Jed comes up with a plan to "save" the Drysdales' marriage.
19	19	"Elly's Animals"	Richard Whorf	Paul Henning & Phil Shuken	January 30, 1963	1–19
Pearl is going to start giving music lessons. This will include piano, singing and yodeling. Pearl's yodeling drives Duke the dog over to the Drysdales' mansion. At the bank, Margaret tells Milburn that she called the dog catcher on Duke. Plus, she called the police on Pearl for her yodeling. The police arrive at the mansion. Miss Jane tells Drysdale that Elly followed the dog catcher to the pound and beat everyone up. At the pound, Frank (Karl Lukas) and Joe (Peter Leeds) tell Miss Jane what Elly did. Elly has Miss Jane bring her and all the dogs at the pound back to the mansion. Sergeant Dean (Eddie Dean) tells Officer Kelly (Brian Kelly) that he met a bunch of nice people in the mansion. The Sergeant then starts yodeling. Later, Pearl's yodeling starts the dogs howling again. The two policemen show up again. This time Officer Kelly says he'll do the talking. But when he sees Elly by the pool, he is quite smitten with her and does nothing about the dogs.
20	20	"Jed Throws a Wingding"	Richard Whorf	Paul Henning & Phil Shuken	February 6, 1963	1–20
The Clampetts get a letter saying that Lester Flatt and Earl Scruggs are coming to Beverly Hills. Granny thinks they're coming to see Pearl as the two were former suitors of hers. They then think that one of them will propose as the letter mentions an engagement. But, the duo were actually referring to a concert they have in the Los Angeles area. And in fact, they are already married to Louise Scruggs (Midge Ware) and Gladys Flatt (Joi Lansing). Jed plans to throw a wingding for the men that evening. Knowing that Lester and Earl had a thing for Pearl, Louise and Gladys arrive at the mansion to look Pearl over. The ladies pretend to be cosmetics saleswomen. They see Granny and hope that she is Pearl. But then they see Elly and thinking she is Pearl, they leave to go to the beauty parlor. That evening, because their wives are still at the beauty parlor, Lester and Earl arrive without them. The wingding starts and everyone is dancing. They were going to have dinner, but Elly's critters ate all the food. The duo play music for the Clampetts. Pearl decides she can't marry either one because she doesn't want to break up their act. Lester and Earl leave to pick up their wives. When they come back, Jed and Pearl think the men got married on the rebound.
21	21	"Jed Plays Solomon"	Richard Whorf	Paul Henning & Phil Shuken	February 13, 1963	1–21
Granny's been letting Elly's dogs go after Pearl every time she yodels. Jed catches Granny and makes her stop. So now Granny calls the police. Sergeant Dean and Officer Kelly arrive at the mansion again. Dean really likes Pearl's yodeling and joins her in song. Kelly is still fond of Elly and goes to see her by the pond. Elly is putting firewood under Granny's still. Kelly doesn't know what a still is, but he tells Elly she shouldn't have an open fire in the yard. When Dean takes Pearl outside to the squad car, Granny thinks she got Pearl in trouble and becomes sad and contrite. Kelly describes what he saw to Dean and Dean says it is for making moonshine. Granny continues to apologize to Pearl. Dean and Kelly figure Granny doesn't know it is illegal to run a still. Granny hears the men talking. She misunderstands and thinks Pearl turned her in. To protect Granny, Jed, Elly and Jethro each say the still is theirs to Dean and Kelly. The men won't do anything if Granny promises to stop making moonshine.
22	22	"Duke Steals a Wife"	Richard Whorf	Paul Henning & Phil Shuken	February 20, 1963	1–22
Granny says Jed and Duke his dog are both down without a woman in their lives. Mrs. Drysdale tells Milburn that her dog Claude is getting married. She's having the dog and its owner flown in from Paris. French woman Mlle. Denise (Narda Onyx) and her poodle Colette arrive at the Clampett mansion. Mlle. Denise speaks very little English, but she manages to ask Jed where the Drysdale home is. While they are talking, Colette wanders off with Duke. Pearl tells Granny about Jed talking to a pretty woman. Mlle. Denise comes back for Colette and when Jed puts the dog in her car, she kisses him. Pearl and Granny see this. Meanwhile, Margaret has arranged the "marriage" between Claude and Colette, complete with a decorated bedroom. But when she starts the wedding music, Duke walks in the room. Jed takes a fancy to Denise and starts to clean himself up. Denise and Miss Jane bring Duke home. Back at the Drysdale mansion, Margaret has Claude meet Colette. But when Colette hears Duke howling, she runs to him. Jed gets all dressed up to return Colette to Denise.
23	23	"Jed Buys the Freeway"	Richard Whorf	Paul Henning	February 27, 1963	1–23
Harry Jones (Jesse White) arrives at the mansion and pretends to be an old family friend. Meanwhile, Miss Jane tells Drysdale about a conman named Harry Jones who is in the area. Harry suggests to Jed that he buy the Hollywood Bowl from him because Pearl could do her yodeling there and sell tickets. Harry and the family drive there to take a look. They get out onto the stage of the Bowl and are very impressed. Harry tells Jed that if he likes hunting, there's no better place than Griffith Park. Pearl is distracted by fantasizing the Bowl is full of people chanting her name. While driving to the Park, Harry tells Elly that if Jed buys the park, he'll throw in all the animals in Griffith Park Zoo. Drysdale and Miss Jane go to the Clampett mansion and find no one there. At first Drysdale doesn't think that Harry could've singled out the Clampetts for his con game. But then they head to the Hollywood Bowl. The Clampetts are impressed by all the animals at the zoo, but Elly thinks they should be set free. On the drive home, the other drivers are honking and yelling at the Clampetts. Harry offers to sell Jed the freeway so he could make the people drive the way he wants. The others drop off Jed and Harry at the mansion. Granny, Jethro and Elly go back to the freeway with their guns to teach the drivers some manners. Miss Jane and Drysdale tell Jed that Harry is a crook. Jed said he found out that Harry is no mountain man because he couldn't hold his liquor.
24	24	"Jed Becomes a Banker"	Richard Whorf	Paul Henning	March 6, 1963	1–24
Rival banker Bill Hacker's (Charles Lane) bank will be competing against Drysdale's bank in a skeet shoot competition. Bill claims one of his employees is a crack shot. Drysdale isn't worried as his Vice President, Mr. Crandell, is a great shot as well. But then Drysdale learns Crandell is in the hospital with several broken bones. When Drysdale finds out about Jed's sharpshooting skills, he makes him bank vice president. Drysdale and Miss Jane take the Clampetts to the skeet shooting range to explain what to do. Milburn finds out that the rest of the family are excellent shots as well. After Hacker talks to Jed, he figures out Drysdale's scheme. Hacker demands that he be allowed to pick a different employee. Hacker sees Granny cleaning Jed's office and, assuming she is the cleaning lady, picks her. The only thing is, Granny is just as good a shot as Jed. Also guest-starring Lester Matthews as Mr. Fleming Pendleton.
25	25	"The Family Tree"	Richard Whorf	Paul Henning	March 13, 1963	1–25
Pearl and Jethro think that Jed should get a new fancy car, but he's happy with the truck. Pearl would also like to get the family into high society. Margaret tells Milburn that Mrs. Priscilla Smith-Standish (Rosemary DeCamp), the head of a 'first family' historical society, will be staying at their house. Drysdale is not impressed. Margaret wants to get rid of the Clampetts before her arrival. She goes to the Clampett mansion, insults Granny and is chased away by Granny and Pearl. Smith-Standish goes to the Clampetts and becomes enchanted with their antiques and way of life. Margaret goes to the bank and tells Drysdale what the Clampetts did to her. She insists that he get rid of them. Miss Jane tells Margaret that the chauffeur dropped Priscilla off at the Clampetts because he thought Margaret was there. Miss Jane drives the Drysdales to the Clampetts. Priscilla tells Margaret that she found evidence that Jed's ancestors came to America prior to the arrival of the Mayflower. She ropes Margaret into helping Granny with the chores done the old fashioned way, much to Margaret's horror. Drysdale is enjoying seeing Margaret have to work that way.
26	26	"Jed Cuts the Family Tree"	Richard Whorf	Paul Henning	March 20, 1963	1–26
Mrs. Smith-Standish and Mrs. Drysdale come visit the Clampetts again. Because of their possible new fame, Pearl wants the family to look and act like "high society". Margaret lets Pearl use her chauffeur and car. But now Margaret needs to get to the bank, so Elly and Jethro drive her in the truck. Margaret is completely embarrassed driving down the street. When she gets to the bank, Margaret is so disheveled that Milburn thinks she's drunk. Pearl comes back so dressed and made up that Jed doesn't recognize her. Pearl brings fancy clothes for the rest of the family. Pearl introduces the family in their new clothes to Priscilla. Priscilla tries not to laugh. Mrs. Drysdale continues to be forced into doing "practices from the past" by Mrs. Smith-Standish. Priscilla and the family then dance to some mountain music. In order to confirm Jed's ancestry, Mrs. Smith-Standish asks him the name of his great grandfather. If his name was Ezekiel, they will be famous worldwide. Jed lies to her to get things back to normal.
27	27	"Granny's Spring Tonic"	Richard Whorf	Paul Henning & Phil Shuken	March 27, 1963	1–27
Granny has made a batch of her annual spring tonic. The family is reluctant to take any. Miss Jane introduces Drysdale to her brilliant-but-frumpy bank protegee, Gloria Buckles (Lola Albright). Gloria volunteers to take Jed some papers that need to be signed. What Miss Jane doesn't know is that Gloria is really a sultry gold-digger with eyes for Jed's $34 million. Granny mentions to Pearl that she gave Jed a double dose of her tonic. Pearl and Granny meet beautiful Gloria and are a little suspicious of her. They keep talking up to Gloria how old Jed is. Gloria takes Jed for a drive. Gloria claims that she has to marry a mountain man. Jed says he hates to see her be alone and that he'll think about it. Back at the mansion, Pearl tries to tell Gloria that Jed has no money. Jed says gather up the family because he might have an announcement. Pearl calls Drysdale, and he and Miss Jane come right over. Jed says marriage is a good idea. Jed must have seen through her scheme because he says she'll have to wait 3 or 4 years until Jethro is old enough.
28	28	"Jed Pays His Income Tax"	Richard Whorf	Paul Henning	April 3, 1963	1–28
IRS agent Mr. Landman (John Stephenson) gets chased away by Granny and her shotgun. Mr. Landman then goes to talk to Drysdale. Landman wants to know how Jed could be poor one year and then very wealthy the next. Drysdale, in flashbacks, explains to Landman how Jed made millions in oil. Then how Pearl suggests Jed move to Beverly Hills. Drysdale tells Landman how Elly didn't want to leave her critters. Drysdale takes Landman back to the mansion to meet the family. On the drive, Drysdale relates how Granny didn't want to move. Drysdale and Landman arrive at the mansion and Jed invites them in for dinner. They accept but then regret it when they hear what they're having.
29	29	"The Clampetts and the Dodgers"	Richard Whorf	Paul Henning & Dick Wesson	April 10, 1963	1–29
Drysdale wants to take Jed and Jethro to shoot some golf. Jed thinks they'll be hunting something called a golf. They'll also be with Los Angeles Dodgers coach Leo Durocher. They believe that he dodges the golfs. Meanwhile at the ball park, Leo is trying to sign pitcher Walsh Wesson. Jed and Jethro are at the golf course. Jed thinks the little white balls are golf eggs. Turns out Drysdale can't make it. Leo and Walsh think that Jed and Jethro are the caddies. A golf ball winds up in a tree a distance away. When Jethro knocks it out with a ball, Leo wants to sign him as a pitcher. Back at home, Jed tells Granny and Elly that Jethro is going to be a baseball player, even though they aren't sure what that is. Elly wants to be one as well. Leo and Buzzie Bavasi (Wally Cassell), the Dodgers General Manager, show up at the mansion. Jethro throws a ball at Leo and knocks him into the swimming pool. When he finds out that Jethro can only throw a ball that has possum fat on it, Leo is no longer interested in him. Also guest-starring Norman Leavitt as Parking Attendant.
30	30	"Duke Becomes a Father"	Richard Whorf	Paul Henning	April 17, 1963	1–30
Duke the bloodhound has been very lethargic lately. Jed gets a letter from Mlle. Denise. She sends a picture of herself, but the letter is in French. Meanwhile, Margaret tells Milburn that her dog Claude is to be a father. She wants Milburn's help in picking names. Jed goes to the bank to have Miss Jane translate the letter for him. The letter says that Denise is coming back for the birth of her dog's puppies and hopes to see Jed. Denise arrives at the mansion and tries to speak English to Granny and Elly. Jed comes home and hopes to continue "courtin' and sparkin" Denise. Margaret shows the puppies nursery to Milburn. Duke shows up at the window and Margaret shoos him away. Margaret isn't nearly so happy when she finds the puppies share more in common with Duke than Claude. Miss Jane tries to teach some French to Jed. The Drysdales bring Denise's dog and the puppies to the Clampetts. Jed takes Denise out to dinner and winds up with Duke and her poodle Colette.
31	31	"The Clampetts Entertain"	Richard Whorf	Paul Henning, Dick Wesson, Herman Miller and Fred Freiberger	April 24, 1963	1–31
Granny has been depressed lately and just sits in the corner of the kitchen. The others try to rile Granny up, but nothing works. Jed arranges a party to cheer Granny up and invites the Drysdales and Miss Jane. Margaret doesn't want to go, but Milburn insists. Miss Jane tells Drysdale that the Chairman of the Board, Marty Van Ransohoff (Jim Backus), has arrived. Marty tells Drysdale that he's putting him on the Board of Directors. Marty wants to go along to the Clampetts. When Drysdale landed Jed's account he lied and told Marty how sophisticated they are. Hearing about the party does get Granny excited. Drysdale goes to speak with Jed. Not wanting Marty to see what the Clampetts are really like, Drysdale makes up a story as to why they can't come to dinner that evening. Drysdale doesn't know that Miss Jane just called Granny and told her that everyone, including Marty, will be coming by tonight. When Drysdale finds out, he's worried what Marty will do because he deceived him about the Clampetts. Miss Jane and Marty arrive at the mansion. Drysdale is too afraid to go to the party. Marty is thrilled with what he believes to be a "Hillbilly Party" thrown for him. He and Miss Jane even dress in Hillbilly clothes and have a great time.
32	32	"The Clampetts in Court"	Richard Whorf	Paul Henning & Dick Wesson	May 1, 1963	1–32
James and Mabel Johnson (Murvyn Vye and Kathleen Freeman) back into the Clampetts' car outside of the Commerce Bank. They tell the Clampetts that no one was hurt. After they discover that the Clampetts are rich, they fake injuries and sue the Clampetts. During the trial, the Clampetts aren't used to court procedures. The Judge (Roy Roberts) makes allowances for that. Mabel enters the courtroom on crutches and James is in a wheelchair. James makes up a story that the Clampetts drove into them in a drunken stupor. Thinking the Johnsons are talking about someone else, Jed tells the Judge they'd be happy to track down those other people. The Judge explains to Jed that he and the family are the ones being accused. When things get out of hand in the courtroom, the Clampetts wind up in jail for a while. The Clampetts bring a bunch of their homemade food into the court. The Johnsons’ Attorney (Dean Harens) then questions the Clampetts. He keeps interrupting them when they try to say they didn't drive into the Johnsons. The Judge finally lets Jed have his say. The couple's story begins to sound made up to the Attorney. Things really unravel when Mabel learns about James' girlfriend. Also guest-starring Jess Kirkpatrick as Bailiff.
33	33	"The Clampetts Get Psychoanalyzed"	Richard Whorf	Paul Henning	May 8, 1963	1–33
Pearl comes to visit. She tells the family that Jethrine didn't marry the local undertaker. Jethrine eloped with Jasper Depew. Jethro needs a health certificate to graduate from the fifth grade. He goes to the only doctor the Clampetts know about - Mrs. Drysdale's psychiatrist, Dr. Eugene Twombly (Herbert Rudley). While talking to Twombly, Jethro falls asleep on the couch. The psychiatrist may have bitten off more than he can chew when he starts treating Jethro. Jethro returns home and says that all Twombly talked about was Jethro's mother. He would like to meet Pearl right away. Pearl would like to hook up with a wealthy Beverly Hills man. Pearl gets all dressed up and goes to see Twombly. She is a little surprised when Twombly closes the curtains and dims the office lights. She thinks he is testing her virtue when he tries to lay her on his couch. Pearl leaves. Later, Jed comes by to see Twombly and tells him he's upset that he made advances toward Pearl. Twombly tries to explain that he's a psychiatrist. Twombly comes to the mansion to apologize for the misunderstanding. Granny questions his doctoring skills. More confusing things happen and Twombly leaves. Also guest-starring Dick Wesson as Patient.
34	34	"The Psychiatrist Gets Clampetted"	Richard Whorf	Paul Henning & Dick Wesson	May 15, 1963	1–34
Jethro wants to go back to Dr. Twombly to get his health certificate. Miss Jane tries to explain to Jethro that Twombly is a psychiatrist. Meanwhile, Granny says it is going to rain and Miss Jane tells her the paper says it won't. Jethro and Twombly have another confusing conversation. Jethro finally gets his bill of health from Twombly so he can graduate the fifth grade. Twombly tells Drysdale that he's very interested in Granny's home remedies for various ailments. Pearl tells Granny she kind of likes Twombly. Drysdale brings Twombly to the Clampetts' just as Granny shows Pearl how to use a love potion, so everyone thinks Twombly's interest in Granny is love. Granny tries to break the spell by blowing a special powder on Twombly. Pearl gets all dressed up and Granny makes herself look like a witch. Twombly still wants to talk to Granny so everyone thinks the spell isn't broken. Pearl tries to impress Twombly with her yodeling, but that doesn't work. Twombly wants to take Granny for a drive in his convertible, but Granny says it is going to rain. Twombly tells Granny it isn't supposed to rain. They step outside and it starts to rain.
35	35	"Elly Becomes a Secretary"	Richard Whorf	Paul Henning & Dick Wesson	May 22, 1963	1–35
Miss Jane gets sick and Mr. Drysdale has to speak at a conference. Miss Jane hasn't finished writing the speech he is to give. Jed comes by the bank to see if there's anything he can do. Drysdale meets the new teller, Bob Billington (John Ashley), who sucks-up to the men and flirts with the women. To help out, Granny is mixing up a cure for Miss Jane and Jethro comes up with a speech for Drysdale. Jed, Elly and Jethro come by the bank. Jed volunteers to have Elly fill in for Miss Jane. Jethro hands Drysdale his speech which Drysdale thinks is the one he was working on. Drysdale leaves and Jed figures that he'll run the bank until Drysdale gets back. Bob tries to make time with secretary Kitty Northcross (Joy Harmon). But then Bob sees Elly and starts to flirt with her. Elly misunderstands Bob's "hipster" talk. At the convention, Drysdale starts to read Jethro's speech and then has to improvise. Jed lends money to a Mr. Wilson (Willis Bouchey), who claims to be a poor chicken rancher. When Bob hears how much money Jed has, he tries to get some. Wilson was actually a test case for the convention. Because Jed was the only one to give him money, Drysdale is named "Banker of the Year".
36	36	"Jethro's Friend"	Richard Whorf	Paul Henning & Jay Sommers	May 29, 1963	1–36
Jed tells Granny that Jethro has invited a friend named Armstrong Dueser McHugh III to come over. Jed thinks Jethro is bringing him to meet Elly. They are surprised when Armstrong turns out to be a little boy from Jethro's school. Wilkins (Hayden Rorke), the chauffeur, coddles the boy and treats him as frail. Wilkins takes out a bunch of pills for Armstrong and tries to protect him from some of Elly's critters. "Duesy" tells the family that his parents travel a lot so he never sees them. Later, Wilkins comes to pick up Armstrong, but Granny says he's having too much fun. Granny forces Wilkins to leave. Wilkins goes to complain to Drysdale. Jethro teaches Duesy how to swim. Elly demonstrates on the Pool Man (Gil Perkins) how Dusey can protect himself from bullies. Granny teaches him how to fish and Jed plays horseshoes with him. Wilkins brings Drysdale and Miss Jane to the mansion. Wilkins finds Dusey napping with Elly's critters. When Wilkins tries to forcibly take him away, Dusey uses one of the moves Elly taught him.

=== Season 2 (1963–64) ===
All episodes in black-and-white

No. overall	No. in season	Title	Directed by	Written by	Original release date	Prod. code
37	1	"Jed Gets the Misery"	Richard Whorf	Paul Henning & Mark Tuttle	September 25, 1963	2–1
Jed pretends to be sick so that Granny can get to doctoring and feel more at home. Jethro can't find any of Granny's mountain medicine ingredients, so she has to improvise. Elly is the only one that knows Jed is faking it. Elly tells Drysdale what Jed is up to. Drysdale pretends he isn't feeling well and asks Granny's advice. This backfires as she puts him to bed with Jed. Drysdale's physician, Dr. Roy Clyburn (Fred Clark), is at the bank. Miss Jane tells him that Milburn is in great shape and has been taking walks every morning. She calls the Clampetts and learns Drysdale is sick in bed. Drysdale tries to tell Granny he's feeling better, but she won't let him leave. Dr. Clyburn comes by the mansion and wants to see the doctor that's taking care of Drysdale. Granny misunderstands and thinks he's another patient. Jethro puts him in bed with Jed and Drysdale. Drysdale thinks Granny is going to operate on him. Clyburn says he can call a pharmacy and get any medicine Granny wants. The Pharmacist thinks Granny's crazy and hangs up. Granny finally finishes doctoring the men and they get to leave.
38	2	"Hair-Raising Holiday"	Richard Whorf	Paul Henning & Mark Tuttle	October 2, 1963	2–2
Granny cuts off the top of Drysdale and Dr. Roy Clyburn's hair for some homegrown remedy. Drysdale would like to tell Granny that she's not allowed to practice medicine in Beverly Hills, but he's afraid to. He sends Miss Jane to tell Granny. Miss Jane comes by the mansion and sees the family celebrating and dancing. Jed tells her it is Possum Day and Jane pretends to know what that is. The Clampetts are looking forward to the Possum Day parade, which of course isn't celebrated in Beverly Hills. Clyburn tells Drysdale he better speak to Granny. The family is about to drive to the bank to watch the parade when Drysdale and Jane drive up. Drysdale tries to tell Granny she can't practice medicine anymore, but all she can talk about is giving him a hair growing medicine. Miss Jane and Drysdale try to set up a parade for the Clampetts, but are having no luck. Granny puts some of her hair medicine on Clyburn's head but he takes it off. Granny wants to head back to the hills after Clyburn tells her to stop her doctoring. Jed finds out there's no Possum Day celebration. They now definitely want to leave and take their money out of the bank. Clyburn sees that Granny's medicine worked as Drysdale now has a full head of hair. Clyburn begs Granny to give him the hair medicine again and Drysdale tells the Clampetts there will be a Possum Day Parade. The next day everyone gets to march in the parade.
39	3	"Granny's Garden"	Richard Whorf	Paul Henning & Mark Tuttle	October 9, 1963	2–3
Granny has everyone up at the crack of dawn to plow the front yard for her garden. Jethro tells Jed that he got a mule to help them plow. The mule wakes Drysdale up and he rans over to the Clampett mansion. Granny can't get the mule to do any work. Drysdale says that the whole neighborhood will get upset if they plow up their front yard. Miss Jane comes by and tries to explain to Jed why they can't dig up the yard. Granny tries to stare down the mule to get it to work. Miss Jane takes the family on a road trip to show them the modern farmers doing their work. Miss Jane then takes them to a large Supermarket to show Granny how unnecessary it is to grow her own food. Granny tries to pay for some food with Confederate money.
40	4	"Elly Starts to School"	Richard Whorf	Paul Henning & Mark Tuttle	October 16, 1963	2–4
Mrs. Drysdale (Harriet MacGibbon) recommends Elly for a high-brow finishing school for girls. Elly doesn't want to go and doesn't want to wear a dress. Mrs. Drysdale calls and tells Jed it is OK for Elly to wear her pants and shirt. Miss Jane learns from Margaret that she wants Elly to go to that school in hopes that humiliating her will drive the Clampetts away. Miss Jane tries to convince the girls at the school that Elly is a fashion trend-setter. She then brings Elly home and tells Jed and Granny that the girls at that school aren't good enough for Elly. Elly invites the filthy rich Cynthia Fenwick (Joanna Barnes) and her mother (Doris Packer) over for dinner, thinking they're destitute. Thinking blue jeans are now high fashion, Cynthia tries to find some. Mrs. Fenwick calls to say they will be late because they can't find clothes. Jed sends Jethro and Elly over with some of theirs. Jethro and Elly think the tiny gate house is where the Fenwicks live. When they tell Jed what they saw, Jed decides to bring the Fenwicks furniture and other things. Margaret sees them loading the truck and thinks the Clampetts are moving. Cynthia finds the clothes that Elly left in the gate house and her and her mother put them on. When Mrs. Fenwick sees herself in jeans, she faints. Also guest-starring Sharon Tate as Mary.
41	5	"The Clampett Look"	Richard Whorf	Paul Henning & Mark Tuttle	October 23, 1963	2–5
The Fenwick's will be visiting the Clampetts. Cynthia wants her mother to dress in the "Clampett Look" since she thinks Elly is a fashion maven. Jed sees the Fenwick gate house and thinking that's where they live, he decides to try and get them to move into his mansion. The Fenwick's arrive at the Clampett mansion and Granny gives Mrs. Fenwick a drink of her white lightning. Mrs. Drysdale comes by and the Fenwick's mistake her for a cleaning woman. Cynthia sees Jethro by the pool and asks Jed who he is. Thinking they're referring to the Clampett dog, Jed says it is Duke. The Fenwick's now think Jethro is royalty. Mrs. Fenwick gets into a brawl with Mrs. Drysdale. Mrs. Drysdale learns that it is Mrs. Fenwick that she's fighting with. The Fenwick's leave and Jed and Jethro follow them. They think that Beasley the chauffeur owns the Fenwick mansion and he has taken the Fenwick's in to live with him. Guest Stars: Joanna Barnes as Cynthia Fenwick, Doris Packer as Mrs. Fenwick, and Tom Cound as Beasley
42	6	"Jethro's First Love"	Richard Whorf	Paul Henning & Mark Tuttle	October 30, 1963	2–6
Jethro decides he wants to go a courtin', so Jed gives him a little education. Jed sends Jethro to the bank with an envelope that Miss Jane needs. Meanwhile, Exotic dancer Chickadee Laverne (Barbara Nichols) comes by the bank to see Drysdale. She wants to be paid for her services at the Banker's Dinner Conference the night before. Jethro comes by and meets Chickadee. Thinking she's the one for him, he brings her home to meet the folks. At the mansion, there's some confusion between the family and Chickadee when the word engagement is used. Chickadee thinks she'll get a job at the mansion and the family thinks she's talking about marriage to Jethro. Granny and Jed think Chickadee is too old for Jethro. Jed talks to Chickadee in private and they have another confusing conversation. Elly tells Chickadee that she likes her. Elly would like her to marry Jed so she could be her mother. Chickadee likes Elly's pets and thinks she could use them in her act. Drysdale and Miss Jane come by and they find out Chickadee is there. Chickadee leaves with Elly's raccoon. Note: This was Sharon Tate's first appearance (of 13) as Janet Trego, a member of the bank's secretarial pool.
43	7	"Chickadee Returns"	Richard Whorf	Paul Henning & Mark Tuttle	November 6, 1963	2–7
Chickadee Laverne shows up at Drysdale's office with Elly's raccoon. She complains that she didn't get an "engagement" at the Clampett mansion. Meanwhile, Jethro thinks he's in love with Chickadee. Miss Jane calls Jethro to say she has Elly's raccoon. Jethro tells her that he's in love and wants to get married right away. She thinks he's talking about her until he mentions Chickadee. Chickadee comes by the mansion. Jed hears music coming from her car radio and thinks that means he's falling in love with her. Chickadee and Jed still have some confusion over what an "engagement" is. Miss Jane arrives at the mansion and gives Elly her raccoon back. She then wants to trick Jethro into thinking he's in love with her using music from a transistor radio. But things don't go as planned. Jethro sees Chickadee in her exotic dancer outfit. Granny says they are to be married right away. The code of the hills demand that because he saw her in her under clothes. Because of a misunderstanding, Granny believes that Chickadee doesn't know how to cook. And that's a deal-breaker for Jethro.
44	8	"The Clampetts Are Overdrawn"	Richard Whorf	Story by : Jay Sommers & Joe Bigelow; Teleplay by : Paul Henning & Mark Tuttle	November 13, 1963	2–8
Granny chases away the Pool Man (Gil Perkins) because she thinks he's poisoning the cement pond. Jethro reads a letter from the bank saying that Jed is overdrawn and all his money is gone. An unemployed actor named Jake "J.D." Clampett (King Donovan) and his wife Opal (Shirley Mitchell) benefit from a paperwork mixup at the bank becoming $36 million richer. Granny thinks that the family has been spending money foolishly. Jed calls the bank and finds out that Drysdale is going out of town. They now believe that Mr. Drysdale has forsaken them and taken the money. The family drives to the bank where they are chased away by a Policeman (Robert Foulk) who thinks they're vagrants. Jake goes to the bank hoping to cash a $1000 check. Opal thinks they're doing the wrong thing. Granny wants to go back to the hills but Jed wants to stay until he finds out if Drysdale really turned against them. A Paving Man (Dick Crockett) comes by the mansion to tar up some cracks in the driveway. He says that Drysdale told him to do it and the family thinks Jed's going to be tarred and feathered. Jed wants to stay until they pay back the overdrawn fee. Meanwhile, Jake is spending a lot of money. When Miss Jane figures out what has happened, Jake Clampett is arrested. Jed wants Jake freed as he might be kinfolk. Jake passes himself off as a long lost cousin and intends to stay at the mansion for a while.
45	9	"The Clampetts Go Hollywood"	Richard Whorf	Paul Henning & Mark Tuttle	November 20, 1963	2–9
"Cousin" Jake and Opal are still living in the mansion. Jake thinks that with Jed's money, he can make a movie with Marlon Brando. Jethro would like to be in the movies. When Jed offers Jake 10 million, Jake agrees to put Jethro in the movie instead of Brando. Jake buys Jed a new car. Elly wants to be a movie star as well and Jake has Opal take her into town to get her made up. Granny still thinks Jake and Opal are a bunch of loafers. Elly returns all dressed up and glamorous and Jake introduces her a Venus Adore. Granny changes her opinion of Jake when he tells her he can put her in a Hoot Gibson movie. After seeing a Marlon Brando movie, Jethro dresses in leather and drives a motorcycle into the mansion. Mr. Drysdale learns from Jake that Jed is financing his movie and wants to put a stop to it. Jed thinks the others are starting to act and dress ridiculously. Miss Jane comes up with a plan to make the others see how foolish they look by having Jed act and dress just as foolish. Note: Jake purchases a brand new 1964 Imperial convertible to improve Jed's image, but the car is never seen again – the Clampett family truck is Jed's choice of vehicle.
46	10	"Turkey Day"	Richard Whorf	Paul Henning & Mark Tuttle	November 27, 1963	2–10
It is almost Thanksgiving and Elly wants to save the turkey from being cooked. Jed catches Elly trying to carry the turkey away in a sack and makes her put it back in its pen. Jethro tells Jed that their fancy eating room is called a billiard room. They think that the rhino head on the wall is a billiard. After Elly names the turkey Herman, Jed finds he can't take an axe to it. Jed tells Granny she should cook a billiard, but she insists on the turkey. Meanwhile, Mrs. Drysdale hires two men (George Sawaya & Benny Rubin) believing they are Indian Chiefs, but they're really actors. She and Mr. Drysdale will dress as pilgrims and take a holiday picture with the men. Jed and Miss Jane have a confusing conversation about shooting billiards. Elly sees the Indians with Drysdale and tells Granny that the Indians are attacking. Granny and Elly jump the Indians and tie them up. Jed calms everything down. The Clampetts, Drysdales, and the two actors have Thanksgiving dinner together.
47	11	"The Garden Party"	Richard Whorf	Paul Henning & Mark Tuttle	December 4, 1963	2–11
Granny is cooking up some lye soap and Jed is worried the fumes will bother Mrs. Drysdale. Margaret is having a garden party that afternoon and goes to talk to Granny about the smell. The fumes are also destroying her hibiscus plant. Jed and Granny misunderstand Margaret and believe they are invited to the party. And Granny thinks that a hibiscus is in the body and wants to doctor Margaret. Drysdale sends Miss Jane to talk to the Clampetts. Jed thinks that a garden party is when you help someone make a garden. Miss Jane tries to talk the Clampetts out of going to the party and tells them it has nothing to do with actual gardening. They still want to go. Miss Jane shows Drysdale the Clampetts all dressed up. The Clampetts arrive at the party with some of Granny's "rheumatism medicine" and some country cooking. Margaret talks them into taking their stuff back and waiting by their 'cement pond' to handle the 'overflow' from her party. After Granny shoots a fake alligator in the pond, the crowd from Margaret's party come over to see what happened. They start drinking the spiked punch and the people are having a great time. With all her guests at the Clampetts, Margaret finally comes over and joins them. Also guest-starring Curt Massey as the violin player, Arthur Gould-Porter as Ravenswood, and Sharon Tate as Young Lady - Party Guest.
48	12	"Elly Needs a Maw"	Joseph Depew	Keith Fowler, Phil Leslie, Paul Henning & Mark Tuttle	December 11, 1963	2–12
Drysdale tells Miss Jane that Mrs. Fenwick is looking for investors for a real estate development project. Jed comes by and tells Drysdale and Miss Jane that he wants a plane ticket to go back to the hills. Elly is still too much of a tom-boy. That morning Elly was riding around on a motorcycle. Jed wants to find a mother for Elly to turn her into a lady. Drysdale thinks he can find a woman in Beverly Hills and Jed leaves. Back at the mansion, Granny is against the idea of Jed marrying a city woman. Drysdale calls Jed and says that Mrs. Fenwick is interested in him, but doesn't mention she's only interested in his money for the project. Jethro drives Jed to the Fenwick gatehouse which they still think is where she lives. Meanwhile, Mrs. Fenwick arrives at the mansion. Jed then shows up and he and Mrs. Fenwick have a confusing conversation. When she finally figures out that Jed is talking about marriage, she leaves.
49	13	"The Clampetts Get Culture"	Joseph Depew	Paul Henning & Mark Tuttle	December 18, 1963	2–13
Granny tells Jed they have no friends in Beverly Hills. Mrs. Drysdale comes by with one of Elly's goats and asks them to keep it out of her yard. Jed at first thinks Margaret is giving them the goat as a gift, until Elly says it is hers. Mrs. Millicent Schuyler-Potts (Eleanor Audley) drives up with Jethro. She tries to tell Jed and Granny that Jethro is being expelled from her school for being disruptive. Margaret tells Elly that she will have the police lock up all of her critters. Jed tells Drysdale that their going back to the hills and want their money. Drysdale asks them to go back to the mansion and he will straighten everything out. Drysdale threatens both Margaret and Millicent and they have to go and make up with the Clampetts. Millicent tells Jed that she'll tutor Jethro privately and that she is attracted to Jed. Miss Jane dresses Granny up and tells her that Margaret wants her to join her Bridge Club. Drysdale wants to take Jed and Jethro to his Golf Club. Things don't go well with Granny playing Bridge. At the Golf Club, Jed and Jethro misunderstand what the steam room is for. Back at the mansion, the Drysdales, Miss Jane and Millicent sing Christmas carols for the Clampetts.
50	14	"Christmas at the Clampetts"	Richard Whorf	Paul Henning & Mark Tuttle	December 25, 1963	2–14
Drysdale has set up a Christmas tree with gifts in the Clampett mansion. The family is confused by some of the gifts. Granny thinks the TV is some kind of fancy washing machine. The family intends to give Mrs. Drysdale a mink, as in the actual animal. At the Drysdale home, Milburn gives Margaret a mink coat. Drysdale tells Margaret that he also got the Clampetts a boat. He hopes that if the Clampetts enjoy the boat enough, they won't want to go back to the hills. Drysdale also got a chimpanzee for the family. The family discovers the boat in the driveway. Jed and Granny then see the chimp in the boat wearing a sailor's suit. At first Margaret doesn't want to go to the Clampetts for Christmas. But Milburn says they have a present for her and it might be the Hope Diamond. After they arrive at the mansion, Drysdale tells Jed he put the boat there as a gift. Granny gives Margaret an assortment of Hillbilly foods as a gift. Elly tells Margaret that she can't find her present and Margaret is quite upset. To teach her a lesson, Drysdale wants to hide Margaret's mink because she just left it laying on the floor. The Clampetts search for a place to sail their boat. But all they see are cars pulling boats.
51	15	"A Man for Elly"	Richard Whorf	Paul Henning & Mark Tuttle	January 1, 1964	2–15
Granny spends all her time watching her television idol, Western actor Quirt Manly (Henry Gibson). This leaves Jethro to have to do the cooking, which isn't working out so well. Granny believes Quirt would be just the man for Elly. Miss Jane tells Jed that Quirt lives in Beverly Hills. Mr. Drysdale arranges for Quirt to stop by the Clampett mansion. Granny is very disappointed when Quirt is revealed to be much less of a man than expected. Elly shows Quirt some of her pets and he says how much he likes animals, especially small ones. He tells Elly about the men who are his stunt and voice doubles on his TV show. His real name is Henry and he's only on the show because his father is the sponsor. Henry recites a poem about raccoons. Henry lets Jethro drive his car around. Jethro winds up picking up a lot of women because they think he's Quirt. Jed keeps trying to make Henry look like a man's man to Granny, but things just don't work out the way he planned.
52	16	"The Giant Jackrabbit"	Richard Whorf	Paul Henning & Mark Tuttle	January 8, 1964	2–16
Jethro is trying to teach Duke to fetch, but is having no luck. Granny complains that because Elly has made all the animals her pets, there's nothing to cook. Jethro says that Mr. Drysdale mentioned a Beverly Caterers will bring food to you. Jed thinks it is a woman's name and that she does the cooking. Jed and Granny call Beverly Caterers, but the conversation doesn't go well. Meanwhile, Miss Jane tells Mr. Drysdale that his wife called and there's a kangaroo in their backyard. Drysdale knows that a banker friend sent it as a joke. He'll have the zoo come and get it. Granny sees a kangaroo and thinks it is an oversized jackrabbit. Jed thinks she's had too much moonshine. Whenever Granny tries to show the animal to Jed, it has moved somewhere else. Jethro tells Miss Jane how rude Beverly Caterers was and Drysdale calls them up. Granny and the kangaroo get into a fist fight. When she tells Jed about it, he asks her where she's hiding the moonshine. Bill Tinsman and Marian Billington from Beverly Caterers come by to apologize and things get a bit confusing. Also guest-starring Arthur Gould-Porter as Ravenswood and Sharon Tate as Janet Trego. Note: As of January 2013, this episode is the 36th most watched prime-time telecast in U.S. television history.
53	17	"The Girl from Home"	Richard Whorf	Paul Henning & Mark Tuttle	January 15, 1964	2–17
Some old love letters from Jethro lead mountain man Lafe Crick (Peter Whitney) and his daughter Essiebelle (Muriel Landers) to Beverly Hills. Though he doesn't actually remember proposing to Essiebelle in the letters, Jethro is now looking forward to marrying her. Jed doesn't think Jethro is ready for marriage. The family goes into town to buy a ring. Essiebelle tries to tell her father that she loves Mel Pratt, a boy back in the hills. Lafe and Essiebelle are let into the mansion by Elly's chimp. The family comes home and Marian Billington from Beverly Caterers arrives for her date with Jethro. When Marian finds out about Essiebelle, she leaves. Jethro is stunned when he sees how much weight Essiebelle's gained. Jethro then goes running after Marian. Jed goes to try and comfort Essiebelle and she tells him she's in love with Mel. Granny and Lafe return with Jethro. Jed and Essiebelle come up with a way to have Lafe call off the wedding.
54	18	"Lafe Lingers On"	Richard Whorf	Paul Henning & Mark Tuttle	January 22, 1964	2–18
Freeloader Lafe Crick and his daughter are headed back home and Granny's glad to see them go. But it is not long before Miss Jane drives Lafe back to the mansion. Lafe pretends to be weak and hungry and claims he doesn't want charity. Lafe manages to con Mr. Drysdale into thinking he's a hard worker and into giving him a job at the bank guarding Jed's money. Granny doesn't think Lafe can be trusted in a bank. When left alone in Drysdale's office, Lafe starts looking around for Jed's money. But when he finds out that most of Jed's money isn't actually in the bank, Lafe then believes Jed has his money buried behind the mansion. Granny had wanted a root cellar dug in the back yard. When her and Jed get up the next morning, they find Lafe has dug a giant hole in the yard.
55	19	"The Race for Queen"	Richard Whorf	Paul Henning & Mark Tuttle	February 5, 1964	2–19
Jethro is working in the hole that will be Granny's root cellar. He thinks he struck oil. Jed doesn't need more oil and they start to fill in the hole. Mr. Drysdale learns that Candy Davis (Susan Hart), one of the Commerce Bank secretaries, will be a contestant for Queen of Beverly Hills. When Margaret hears that the winner gets a trip around the world, she suggests Elly should run. That way the family would be gone for a while. Jethro tries digging in a different spot, but hits oil again. Milburn thinks the Clampetts are digging the hole to put their money in. He tells Granny about the advantages of the vault at the bank and Granny thinks he means to use as her root cellar. Miss Jane suggests to Jed that Elly run for Queen. The Clampetts think the race for the Queen is an actual foot race. So, Granny wants to run as well. Mr. Drysdale tries to talk Candy out of running, while Miss Jane gets Granny to not run. Robert Cummings, the Contest Announcer, names Candy and Elly as the finalists. Milburn states that Candy has withdrawn, but the bank will pay for a trip around the world for her. Miss Jane will take Candy's place in the contest. Elly states that she'd rather have Miss Jane win. Robert announces fellow judge Karen Crandall as the winner. Also guest-starring John Alvin as Harry Barth.
56	20	"Lafe Returns"	Richard Whorf	Paul Henning & Mark Tuttle	February 12, 1964	2–20
To get Elly's mind off of her critters, Jed calls Drysdale to see if there are any eligible men at the bank. Miss Jane comes up with the bank's new CPA, Fred Penrod (Bobs Watson). Jed meets Fred and there's some confusion over Fred's name. Meanwhile, Lafe Crick comes back to the Clampett mansion and brings Granny a Pawpaw tree. Granny is not happy to see Lafe. Lafe wants to plant the tree himself because he's still thinks Jed has his money buried in the ground. Jed tells Elly that Fred is coming to court her. Lafe overhears Jed and reminds him that he has a single son back home. Jed is not interested. Fred arrives and Lafe tries to scare him off by giving a bad description of Elly. Fred is about to leave and then he sees Elly. Granny hears Lafe call back home trying to get his son to come and marry Elly. Miss Jane and Drysdale arrive and run into Lafe. They still mistakenly believe Lafe is a hard worker and a dear friend of Jed's. Lafe digs a giant hole in the back yard.
57	21	"Son of Lafe Returns"	Richard Whorf	Paul Henning & Mark Tuttle	February 19, 1964	2–21
Elly is getting ready for a date with Fred Penrod. Granny has Elly dress up the way Granny used to when she was younger. Jed thinks the clothes are a bit out of date. Fred comes by and Jed and Jethro still are confused about his name. Fred is a little surprised by Elly's outfit. Jethro drives the two away in the truck. Lafe arrives at the mansion with his son Dub (Conlan Carter). Dub is not too bright. Lafe wants Dub to court Elly and marry her. Jed is not thrilled about them being there. But he'll let them spend the night if they don't bother Granny. So Granny doesn't see it, Jed has Jethro move Lafe's car. Jethro winds up pushing it down a hill and it gets destroyed. Drysdale learns from Lafe about his son Dub. Thinking Dub is as hard working as Lafe, Drysdale would like to get him a job at the bank. Drysdale gives Lafe some money to fly the boy over, not knowing Dub's already here. Granny sees Dub and gets mad that there's a Crick in the house. Jed tries to make her think she imagined it. Granny then sees Lafe but Jed tells her he's not there. Granny sets a trap for the Crick's using food, but she catches Jethro instead.
58	22	"The Clampetts Go Fishing"	Richard Whorf	Paul Henning & Mark Tuttle	February 26, 1964	2–22
Drysdale wants to get the Clampetts interested in deep sea fishing. Jed has been disappointed that there's no good hunting in Beverly Hills. Drysdale and Miss Jane bring them a taxidermied trophy fish to mount on the wall. Granny tries cooking the fish. Because of Granny's fear of boats, the Clampetts go fishing on the bridge that goes over the Los Angeles River. At the bank, Drysdale tells Granny and Jed that he has chartered a boat for them. Granny's fear of boats only temporarily thwarts Drysdale's plan to take the Clampetts deep sea fishing. He wants to take them to Marineland to see the types of fish they could catch in the ocean. They want to save Drysdale the trip and go to Marineland by themselves. Thinking that they're large fishing holes, Granny wants to "catch the whale". The family is stunned when they see how big a whale really is. Granny still wants to get one. Elly wants to take a walrus home, but Jed stops her. Elly does sneak a baby seal home.
59	23	"A Bride for Jed"	Richard Whorf	Paul Henning & Mark Tuttle	March 4, 1964	2–23
Lester Flatt and Earl Scruggs are visiting the Clampetts. Gladys Flatt (Joi Lansing) and Louise Scruggs (Midge Ware) came along. The women don't look forward to cooking lessons from Granny. Lester and Earl ask Jed why he hasn't married a city woman yet. Drysdale and Miss Jane come by the mansion to meet the men. Drysdale asks them how they met their wives. The men say they found them by holding auditions for backup singers. Miss Jane suggests doing the same for Jed. Meanwhile, Gladys and Louise want to get out of cooking lessons by suggesting to Jed that they take Elly to San Francisco to make a lady out of her. Lester and Earl are all for the idea, because then they can bring the other women to the mansion for the auditions. Louise calls the mansion to let their husbands know they arrived safely. Not knowing who's calling, Miss Jane thinks they're interested in the auditions. The mansion is filling up with women. Gladys and Louise come back and want to know what their husbands are up to. Lester and Earl decide to get out of the wife finding business.
60	24	"The Critter Doctor"	Richard Whorf	Paul Henning & Mark Tuttle	March 11, 1964	2–24
Elly calls Dr. Martin (Russell Collins) of the zoo and wants him to come over to treat her dog Duke who is sick. Granny is upset because she thinks she should be treating Duke. Jed tries to tell Granny that he also wants Dr. Martin to come over as he might be the right man for Elly. Jed wants Elly to ask Dr. Martin to come to dinner later. Dr. Martin arrives and he is an elderly man. Without Jed or Granny meeting him, Elly takes him upstairs to the bedroom that Duke is in. Meanwhile, Granny mistakes a bug repellent salesman, Jim Gardner (Mark Goddard), for the veterinarian. She has Elly meet Jim and Jim takes a liking to Elly. After Jim gives Granny a sales pitch, Granny thinks Jim is no "Critter Doctor" but actually a "Bug Doctor" who is there to sell "bug vittles". Dr. Martin is leaving without Granny or Jed actually meeting him. Granny refuses to make dinner for the Bug Doctor. Jim teaches Elly the "Hooterville Hop". Dr. Martin comes back and brings Elly another critter. Granny is taken with Dr. Martin, after finally meeting him. They figure out who Jim is. Jim, Elly, Granny and Dr. Martin go on a double date.
61	25	"Granny Versus the Weather Bureau"	Richard Whorf	Paul Henning & Mark Tuttle	March 25, 1964	2–25
Jethro is excited about watching the weather report on TV because of the pretty Weather Girl (Quinn O'Hara). Granny says the girl's prediction for dry weather that evening is wrong. Granny says it is going to rain. She tells Elly some of her weather prediction methods. Granny then shows Elly her weather beetle Cecil. Jed calls Justin Addison (John McGiver), the head of the Weather Bureau for the area. Granny tells Justin that it is going to rain tonight. Justin tries to explain to her about all of their scientific equipment. Drysdale and Miss Jane come by and Jed says he'd like to meet Mr. Addison. Drysdale introduces Jed to Justin. The two misunderstand each other when Justin talks about Hurricane Daisy and Jed thinks he's talking about Granny. Justin is brought to the mansion where he shows the Clampetts a movie about modern weather prediction. Justin once again says it won't rain and it suddenly starts to pour. Justin decides to use weather beetle Cecil to make his predictions.
62	26	"Another Neighbor"	Richard Whorf	Paul Henning & Mark Tuttle	April 1, 1964	2–26
It is tonic time in Beverly Hills. Granny's made a batch of extra strong tonic and wants to give it to the local residents. Margaret tells Drysdale that the Countess Maria (Jean Willes) is coming to town for the social event of the year. Maria has leased the mansion next to the Clampetts and Margaret is afraid they'll ruin things. Maria gets a sample of the tonic and loves it. Maria goes to the Clampetts to get more tonic and is attracted to Jed. She wants to throw a party and serve the tonic. Jethro tells them that Mrs. Drysdale poured out the rest of Granny's tonic into the pool. Maria goes to the bank and tells Margaret that she'll be throwing a party for high society people. Maria says that she's inviting the Clampetts and that Margaret is not invited. Miss Jane goes to the mansion to arrange a peace treaty between Granny and Margaret. She drinks some of the tonic and starts to chase after Jethro. The Countess and Humphrey (Burt Mustin), her Chauffeur, pick up Jed to go for a drive. Granny discovers that the tonic in the pool is now perfectly watered down. Maria and Humphery drink some of the perfect tonic. The party Maria throws at the Clampett mansion winds up being a wedding party for her and Humphrey. Susan Hart as secretary Candy Davis.
63	27	"The Bank Raising"	Richard Whorf	Paul Henning & Mark Tuttle	April 8, 1964	2–27
Drysdale is having a ground-breaking ceremony for a new bank building. Marian Billington from Beverly Caterers arrives at the bank. Fleming Pendleton (Lester Matthews) comes by and wants to introduce John Lucus (Addison Richards) to Jed. Fleming mistakenly believes Jed is a financial wizard. Jed arrives and Fleming and John try to get investment tips from Jed. The men overhear Jed say something about crawdads to Marian. The men think crawdad is a stock and call their brokers to buy all they can. Jed misunderstands and gets the rest of the family to help build the bank. They arrive at the vacant lot for the ground breaking ceremony. The family is surprised when Drysdale only lifts one shovelful of dirt. Everyone leaves and Jed decides to start building the bank themselves. The next morning Drysdale looks at the lot and sees a small cabin with "The New Commerce Bank" written on it.
64	28	"The Great Crawdad Hunt"	Richard Whorf	Paul Henning & Mark Tuttle	April 15, 1964	2–28
The Clampetts are excited to get a big food package from home. Harry Sledge (Peter Leeds), the package delivery driver, is surprised when Jethro lifts the giant box by himself. Meanwhile, John Lucus wants Drysdale to introduce him to Jed. John believes Jed is a financial wizard. Fleming Pendleton comes by and the two ask Drysdale to find out what Jed's crawdad stock is. Later, John tells Fleming that he believes that Jed is developing Crawdad, an amphibious military vehicle. John talks to Harry about the package he delivered to the Clampetts. The men would like Harry to go back to the Clampetts to find out some more information. Harry goes to the mansion under the guise of needing another signature. He misunderstands many of the goings on there. Harry tells John and Fleming that Granny is developing a rocket fuel, Jethro is a mathematical genius and Elly has uncovered new secrets of genetics. The three men make a vow not to reveal Jed's experiments.
65	29	"The Dress Shop"	Richard Whorf	Paul Henning & Mark Tuttle	April 22, 1964	2–29
At the bank, Jethro mentions to Jed how many tickets they've gotten parking in front. Thinking the tickets are a good thing and wanting to share them, Jed has Jethro put them on other cars. Mr. Drysdale has Jed buy a Beverly Hills dress store for an investment. The Clampetts want to go there to help. At the store, Doorman Maurice (Maurice Marsac) shows Mrs. Langwell (Marjorie Bennett) in. Madame Renee (Natalie Schafer) shows Mrs. Langwell the dress that was designed for her. The Clampetts show up and Renee thinks they're Welfare cases. When the family says they're here to help, Renee thinks they want a job. The family believes that Renee is poor and that her model is her starving daughter. They decide to go and buy some food for them. The family returns with a large amount of food. Drysdale and Miss Jane turn up and explain that the Clampetts own the building. Granny says they're taking Renee's daughters (models) to the mansion to fatten them up. Renee says she needs them for a fashion show later and Granny says they'll do the show. Elly puts on a fashion show for the customers and Granny starts the bidding for the dresses. They sell every dress in the store for a total of $50.
66	30	"The House of Granny"	Richard Whorf	Paul Henning & Mark Tuttle	April 29, 1964	2–30
Jed wants to turn their newly acquired Beverly Hills dress boutique, The House of Renee, into a country store, The House of Granny. Jed and Jethro go to the store and because they don't have a key, Jed tries to pick the lock on the door. A Police Officer (Ray Kellogg) comes by and arrests them. Jed calls Granny from jail and tells her to get a hold of Mr. Drysdale. Drysdale winds up in jail with Jed and Jethro. Miss Jane gets the men out of jail. The Clampetts start adding country touches to their store. Granny wants to fire Doorman Maurice, but Jed lets him stay and he would like to design dresses. Drysdale and Miss Jane come by the store. Granny gives Drysdale a haircut. Granny is sad because there haven't been any customers. Jed decides to give the store to Maurice. Edna Skinner as Mrs. Wright, a customer. Also guest-starring George Cisar as Police Sergeant.
67	31	"The Continental Touch"	Richard Whorf	Paul Henning & Mark Tuttle	May 6, 1964	2–31
Granny wants to teach Elly how to cook, but she has to catch Elly first. The cooking lesson doesn't go well. Jed goes to the Beverly Hills dress boutique he used to own, which is now the House of Maurice. Jed asks Maurice if he could teach Elly how to be a lady. Maurice and Madame Potvin dress Elly up and teach her some French. Mrs. Drysdale comes by the boutique and bad mouth's the Clampetts to Maurice. Margaret sees Elly in a black wig, and not recognizing her, mistakes Elly for royalty. Drysdale and Miss Jane come by because Drysdale is worried Margaret will spend too much money. Margaret tells them that there is a Princess in the building. Drysdale and Miss Jane recognize Elly but don't say anything. Drysdale, Miss Jane and Maurice play along and let Margaret meet the Princess. Margaret would like to throw a party for the Princess. The family comes to visit Elly and arrive through the back. To teach Margaret a lesson, Miss Jane tells the Clampetts they're invited to the Drysdales for a party. Margaret faints when she learns who her royal guests really are.
68	32	"Jed, Incorporated"	Richard Whorf	Paul Henning & Mark Tuttle	May 13, 1964	2–32
Mr. Drysdale wants Jed to incorporate for the tax advantages and call it Clamco, Inc. Jed is President, Granny is Vice-President, Elly is the Secretary and Jethro will be treasurer. The Clampetts want to take over the top floor of the Commerce Bank. Drysdale is against the idea, but he can't bring himself to say no to Jed. The Clampetts arrive at the bank. Granny thinks the elevator is the penthouse where they'll be working. Once they get up to their floor, they're impressed by the size and their names on the doors. Jed's not sure what type of business they're in. When Granny has Jethro look up the word vice, she says she quits because she doesn't want to be president of that. Miss Jane tries to explain what a corporation does, but none of the family understands her. Drysdale tries to tell Jed that the corporation was formed so they would give less taxes to the government. Drysdale then says that Clamco can stimulate the economy by getting more money into the hands of more people. Jed misunderstands and the family starts throwing money out of the windows to the people below. When he hears that he can't give money away like that, Jed dissolves the corporation.
69	33	"Granny Learns to Drive"	Richard Whorf	Paul Henning & Mark Tuttle	May 20, 1964	2–33
Cab driver Richard Burten (Mel Blanc) brings Granny home from town. Granny thinks he's a really nice man for driving people around. She gets mad when Richard asks her for the cab fare, not understanding how cabs work. Granny gets her shot gun and chases Richard away. Granny now wants to learn how to drive. Jed is excited to see Elly cooking, but then he gets a look at what she made and he can't even cut it with a knife. Jethro gives Granny driving lessons, but it doesn't go well. Richard comes back and is almost hit by Granny driving. After talking to Elly, he thinks the mansion is a mental institution. Drysdale and Miss Jane come by and Richard thinks Drysdale is the doctor in charge. Richard tells him about Granny driving and Drysdale tells Miss Jane to call the police to bring her back safely. Richard then tells him about the misunderstanding about the cab fare and Drysdale pays him. Granny goes through a red light and a Motorcycle Cop (Harry Lauter) starts chasing them. Granny crashes into the mansion's front door. The Cop arrives and is about to give Granny a ticket. Richard tells the Cop the mansion is an institution and Drysdale is the doctor. After talking to Drysdale and seeing Elly's chimp walking around, the Cop leaves.
70	34	"Cabin in Beverly Hills"	Richard Whorf	Paul Henning & Mark Tuttle	May 27, 1964	2–34
Mrs. Drysdale asks Jed what is an old cabin doing in his backyard. Jed explains that Mr. Drysdale had a replica made of Jed's old cabin as a surprise for Granny's birthday. She's been homesick. Drysdale and Miss Jane bring Granny home and she is upset because no one said anything about her birthday. Drysdale tries to tell Margaret that the cabin is only temporary. They blindfold Granny and put her in the cabin. When she takes the blindfold off, she thinks she's in heaven. Ginny Jennings (Sheila James), a student majoring in sociology, comes by the mansion. The Drysdales are outside and Ginny thinks it is their home. Ginny is doing a survey on the servants homeowners have. The Drysdales and Miss Jane leave. Ginny sees Jed and asks him some questions. She thinks the Clampetts live in the cabin as Drysdale's servants. Ginny wants to stop what she thinks is Drysdale's oppression. Margaret continues to complain about the cabin to Milburn. Ginny brings Professor Robert Graham (John Stephenson) to the bank to talk to Drysdale. After the conversation, Ginny and Graham believe Drysdale is a tyrant and vow to stop him. Ginny brings Graham to the mansion and the cabin. Ginny insists the Clampetts celebrate in the mansion. Still not knowing that the Clampetts own the place, Ginny and Graham believe they have started to free them of their oppression.
71	35	"Jed Foils a Homewrecker"	Joseph Depew	Paul Henning & Mark Tuttle	June 3, 1964	2–35
Mrs. Drysdale hires a demolition man to remove the Clampetts' cabin. Mr. Drysdale decides to occupy the cabin so it can't be removed. He wants Miss Jane to chop some fire wood for him. Jethro helps Miss Jane with the wood and she wants to give him a kiss. She gives Jethro the keys to Drysdale's limousine, suggesting they kiss there, but Jethro just wants to drive it. Because of something that Miss Jane let slip, the Clampetts think a "home wrecker" is breaking up the Drysdales' marriage. Meanwhile, Ginny Jennings and Professor Graham still believe the Clampetts are being oppressed. Ginny wants to publish a story about the Clampetts plight, but Graham warns she could be sued. At the mansion, Ginny and Graham learn from Miss Jane that the Clampetts still use the cabin. Ginny and Graham talk with the Clampetts and then Drysdale and they continue to misunderstand the situation. Ginny sees Jethro drive up in Drysdale's limousine and encourages him to take the car and drive his family away. The next morning a man from the wrecking company comes by the cabin. He thinks Drysdale is a vagrant and then Jed shows up. Jed thinks the Wrecker is the man breaking up the Drysdales' marriage and sends him off. Ginny, Graham and the Wrecker return and more confusion ensues.
72	36	"Jethro's Graduation"	Joseph Depew	Paul Henning & Mark Tuttle	June 10, 1964	2–36
It is Jethro's graduation day and Jed bought him a new watch as a present. Flashback to when Jethro first enrolled at Mrs. Millicent Schuyler-Potts' school. Back to the present and Jed tells Jethro how proud they all are. Miss Jane comes by with a book as a present for Jethro, but all he's interested in is his watch. Mrs. Potts calls and tells Jed that Jethro is late for his graduation ceremony rehearsal. Jethro gets to the school and tells Mrs. Potts about the extravagant suit he's going to wear. Mrs. Potts panics and calls Drysdale. Drysdale comes by and Millicent tells him she's afraid Jethro will ruin the ceremony. And she's worried Jethro will jeopardize her chances for a new large endowment from philanthropist Theodore Switzer (Donald Foster). Drysdale and Millicent come up with a plan to have Jethro show up late to the ceremony. Diana Davis (Lisa Davis), Mrs. Pott's assistant, will get Jethro's watch and set it back. Millicent will do the same with Jed's watch. Millicent tells Diana that after Theodore Switzer has left, they will have a special ceremony just for Jethro. Granny thinks it is later than what their watches say so her, Elly and Skipper the chimpanzee head to the school. Skipper takes Jethro's place in his sixth grade graduation ceremony, impressing Mr. Switzer so much that he doubles his endowment.

=== Season 3 (1964–65) ===
All episodes in black-and-white

No. overall	No. in season	Title	Directed by	Written by	Original release date	Prod. code
73	1	"Jed Becomes A Movie Mogul"	Joseph Depew	Paul Henning & Mark Tuttle	September 23, 1964	3–1
Miss Jane comes by the mansion. She tells Jed and Granny that Drysdale has bought Mammoth Pictures, a movie studio, for Jed. Miss Jane is a little disappointed that Jed doesn't grasp the importance of what she said. The Clampetts drive to the studio. The Gate Guard (Ray Kellogg) won't let them in. Miss Jane tells Jed that she'll call Lawrence Chapman (Milton Frome), the head of the studio, and arrange a tour. At the studio Chapman introduces Jed to Sir Trevor Gielgud Burton-Guinness (John Abbott), a movie star. He's starring in the movie "Dr. Jekyll and Mr. Hyde". Jed is startled because Trevor is made up and looks like Mr. Hyde. Chapman takes the family to a screening room. Jed, Granny, Elly and Jethro want to "help" the studio, which is losing money, by working at the studio. Chapman wants to make Jed happy so he decides to put Elly in the Dr. Jekyll movie and let Jethro think he's a producer. The Director (Russ Conway) explains the scene to Elly. Mr. Hyde grabs Elly and she throws him through a window. Also guest-starring Alvy Moore as Alvin. Note: This episode also features the Clampetts watching an extended scene of Doris Day and Rock Hudson in their upcoming comedy film Send Me No Flowers, due to be released 3 weeks after this episode aired.
74	2	"Clampett City"	Joseph Depew	Paul Henning & Mark Tuttle	September 30, 1964	3–2
Jed tells Granny he's going to the movie studio to start making pictures. Drysdale tells Miss Jane that he wants to build a city on the location where Jed's movie studio is at. He wants to call it Clampett City. Elly suggests that Jed make a movie about her critters. When Jed goes outside he sees the truck full of animals. Jethro pretends to be a producer. He dresses up like one and is smoking a cigar. The cigar makes him sick and he can't drive Jed to the studio. Meanwhile, Lawrence Chapman is yelling at his producers, who are also his nephews, for not making a hit movie. Jed talks to Chapman on the phone and says he'd like to make a cowboy picture. Chapman wants to keep Jed happy and gives him an office and Miss Swenson as his secretary. Drysdale goes to see Jed and tells him about Clampett City. Jed would like to keep the studio and have everyone keep their jobs. Drysdale agrees to keep the studio for now and will start building a city on the back lot. The Clampetts mistake a western prop town for their city. A film is being shot not far away. Two actors (Phil Gordon and Elvia Allman) mistake Jed and Granny as extras for the film. A Cowboy Monster (Don Megowan) then shows up and Jed and Granny try to welcome him. Also guest-starring Herb Ellis as Producer #1, Sidney Clute as Producer #2, Kip King as Producer #3, and Ray Kellogg as Producer #4.
75	3	"Clampett City General Store"	Joseph Depew	Paul Henning & Mark Tuttle	October 7, 1964	3–3
Drysdale shows Miss Jane a model of Clampett City. Miss Jane tells him that the Clampetts moved into the back lot town. The Clampetts are building their "general store" on their Western set. Jed hopes Elly will find a man at their store. Drysdale tells Lawrence Chapman that he wants the Clampetts out of the back lot. Chapman says that Jed owns the studio and can do whatever he wants. Drysdale tries to make Jed understand that the back lot is where he wants to start building the city. Jed likes it the way it is. Meanwhile, Drysdale makes sure that Jethro, Elly, and Granny are cast in a picture about Nero (Theo Marcuse) and Cleopatra. He hopes the movie will be a flop so he can tear down the studio. Drysdale is about to plow under the general store when Jed comes out. Chapman is directing the film and Jethro messes things up. The actor playing Nero wonders why Chapman cast Granny as Cleopatra. Jethro rides a chariot to the general store. Jed wonders why there have been no customers to the store yet. Chapman shoots a scene where Elly is to be fed to the lions, but she befriends the lion. Granny gets Nero drunk and Elly brings the lion to the store. Also guest-starring Nestor Paiva as a Roman Slave Auctioneer.
76	4	"Hedda Hopper's Hollywood"	Joseph Depew	Paul Henning & Mark Tuttle	October 14, 1964	3–4
Announcer Bill Baldwin is in a helicopter over the Clampett mansion. He describes the place and talks about how Drysdale purchased Mammoth Studios for Jed. Drysdale says the studio is losing money. He wants to tear it down and build Clampett City. Baldwin then transfers to Famed Hollywood gossip columnist Hedda Hopper. She hopes to convince Jed not to allow the historic movie studio to be torn down. Baldwin is now flying over the western city back lot of the studio and says that Jed has dropped from sight. Baldwin doesn't know that the Clampetts are in the back lot. Granny still wonders why no one has moved into their city. Hedda Hopper drives into the city. Granny initially thinks Hedda's interest in Jed is romantic. Hedda would like to talk to Jed and Jethro drives her and Jed to see some Hollywood landmarks. Jed is surprised when he sees the footprints and signatures at Grauman's Chinese Theatre. Drysdale and Miss Jane arrive at Clampett General Store hoping to stop Hedda from influencing Jed. Still at Grauman's, Jed is taking some cement and is filling in the footprints and signatures. A Policeman (Don Haggerty) comes by and stops Jed. Hedda straightens things out with the Policeman. Hedda persuades Jed to make films in the tradition of old. She becomes special guest at a screening of the Clampetts' first masterpiece, a silent film called "Little Orphan Elly". She changes her mind about saving the studio when she sees the film. Hedda goes back to Clampett General Store and bulldozes it down. Note: In 1997, TV Guide ranked this episode No. 62 on its list of the 100 Greatest Episodes. Series star Irene Ryan can be seen, without her "Granny" make-up, as one of the people in the crowd as Jed is leaving with the policeman. She is the lady in the center laughing at Jed's parting line, "Careful of the wet cement, folks".
77	5	"Doctor Jed Clampett"	Joseph Depew	Paul Henning & Mark Tuttle	October 21, 1964	3–5
Jed gets an honorary doctorate when he donates money to the college that Mr. Drysdale attended. The family thinks he can now practice medicine, which doesn't sit well with Granny. Granny has Jethro drive her to the college so she can buy a doctor's certificate as well. A Bus Driver (Cully Richards) is taking people on a tour and points out the Clampett mansion. The driver mentions that Jed owns Mammoth Pictures Studios. A Mother (Hazel Shermet) asks if they could stop at the mansion. She would like Jed to see her dancing daughter Beverly (Teena Marie). Jed thinks they are all there for medical help. Beverly performs for Jed and the Mother asks when he could cast her. Jed thinks she means something else and says Granny will do the casting. Meanwhile, Granny's at the Dean's office and she gives him $6 for a certificate. He thinks it is some fraternity prank. When Jethro says he isn't in a fraternity, the Dean calls for a psychiatrist. Granny comes home and tells Jed about all the tests she had to take. She sees Elly and Jethro dressed in medical clothes and says she wants no part of this doctoring. They also had some medical equipment sent over from the movie studio. When the Mother and Beverly come back, Granny agrees to help. A bunch of people come to audition and Jed thinks they are all there for medical help from Granny. There's a woman (Virginia Sale) who dresses like a bird. Then there's a fire eater and a Knife Thrower and many more. Also guest-starring Joyce Nizzari as Knife Thrower's Assistant.
78	6	"Back to Marineland"	Joseph Depew	Paul Henning & Mark Tuttle	November 4, 1964	3–6
Jed and Jethro go to the bank to tell Drysdale that Jethro would like to enlist in one of the armed forces. Drysdale thinks he should finish school first. Jethro then mentions he would like to be a "double naught spy" because of all the loving and fighting. Miss Jane tires to talk him out of it. Jethro now must decide which branch of service he will join. Jethro still wants to be a spy. Granny thinks he should join the Marines because they can feed Jethro all the fish at Marineland. Granny wants to go with Jethro when he goes to Marineland so she can have another chance to catch a whale. Jed thinks Jethro should decide for himself. Miss Jane comes by the mansion. To discourage Jethro from being a spy, she will give him a "spy test". The family heads to Marineland. They talk to the Marineland Manager (Robert Carson) and Jethro mistakenly volunteers to be a diver who feeds the fish. And while there, Granny wants another chance to catch a whale but is frightened away. Jethro comes by Jed in a heavy deep sea driver suit and a bucket of raw fish. Jed says a Marine has to fend for himself and Jethro should cook the fish and eat it. Elly plays with the dolphins. Granny lassos the whale and is pulled into the tank. The family leaves Marineland. Also guest-starring Sharon Tate as Janet Trego.
79	7	"Jed the Heartbreaker"	Joseph Depew	Paul Henning & Mark Tuttle	November 11, 1964	3–7
Elly is teaching her raccoon Clyde to wash dishes. Jed says Granny is in a foul mood and they hide Clyde in a pot. Mrs. Drysdale comes by the swimming pool and starts a fight with Granny because of the smelly lye soap Granny's making. Jed splits them up and Granny falls into the pool. Margaret goes to the bank to complain about the Clampetts. Miss Jane says that Drysdale is in San Francisco. Because of something Miss Jane says, Margaret thinks she can get the hillbillies to move out by throwing herself at Jed. Meanwhile, Granny leads Elly to believe that she's about to breathe her last. Granny tries to make Jed feel guilty for breaking up her fight with Margaret, but he's not falling for it. Margaret comes by the mansion and starts flirting with Jed. Jed doesn't grasp what she's doing. Granny thinks Margaret has a thing for Jed, but he thinks she's concerned about her weight. Margaret comes by again and starts chasing Jed and gives him a kiss. Jed runs out of the mansion. Jed goes to the bank wanting to tell Drysdale that he's moving back to the hills, but Drysdale isn't there. The family starts loading up the truck to move. After Miss Jane tells Jed what Mrs. Drysdale is up to, he turns the tables on Mrs. Drysdale.
80	8	"Teenage Idol"	Joseph Depew	Paul Henning & Mark Tuttle	November 18, 1964	3–8
Jed gets a call from back home and learns that Johnny Poke (Jesse Pearson), an old friend, is arriving on the train. Granny remembers Johnny as a no account and he always took advantage of his mother. Elly remembers that he used to play the guitar and sing. What they don't know is that Johnny is now an Elvis-like singing idol. Granny is really getting worked up about kids nowadays always sassing their elders and says they should be punished. There's a sonic boom outside and a puppy walks in the kitchen. Granny thinks she changed Jethro into the puppy. On the train, Eddie Colton (Alan Reed), Johnny's manager, tells him it is time to change clothes. Johnny dresses as a farm boy in order to avoid all the girl fans. Jed and Jethro meet Johnny at the freight yard and think he's still down and out. Johnny tries to tell them how rich he is and they think he's just putting on airs. Meanwhile, Granny tries some spells to change Jethro back from a puppy. Elly takes the puppy and leaves her chimp which Granny now thinks is Jethro. Jed, Jethro and Johnny arrive at the mansion, but Johnny wants to go to his hotel suite. Granny is thrilled when she sees Jethro. Johnny calls Eddie, but then he sees Elly and hangs up. Johnny keeps trying to tell Jed that he's rich. Granny thinks that she turned Johnny into a skunk.
81	9	"The Widow Poke Arrives"	Joseph Depew	Paul Henning & Mark Tuttle	November 25, 1964	3–9
Granny has sent for the Widow Emma Poke (Ellen Corby) from back home. She hopes to play matchmaker between Emma and Jed. Miss Jane and Drysdale are headed to the mansion. Drysdale doesn't like the idea of Jed marrying Emma. But he changes his mind when he hears her son Johnny Poke makes a million dollars a year. At the mansion, they learn from Granny that Jed doesn't even know Emma is coming. Miss Jane, Drysdale and Elly go to pick up Emma. Granny lets it slip to Jed that Emma is coming, but she claims Emma is coming to visit her. Jed says that Emma is welcome to stay with them, he just doesn't want any matchmaking. Emma arrives at the mansion. Granny lets it slip that she intends to have Emma marry Jed and he hears it. Everyone is staying for lunch and Granny keeps mentioning how young Jed and Emma look. After, Jed and Emma go off to talk. Much to Jed's relief, Emma tells him she can't marry him. Jed and Emma come up with a plan to stop Granny's matchmaking by acting like a bunch of teenagers.
82	10	"The Ballet"	Joseph Depew	Paul Henning & Mark Tuttle	December 2, 1964	3–10
Granny is sad because no one comes to visit her. Jed tries to make her feel better by telling her that movie stars are lonely too. There are maps to their homes so they can get visitors. Granny wants to invite some stars over for a square dance. Jed tells Granny that Mrs. Drysdale wants him to invest in the Beverly Hills Ballet Company, but he doesn't know what ballet is. Meanwhile, Margaret tells Victor Gregory (Leon Belasco), Maestro of the Ballet, that she will try to get Jed to donate $190,000. Granny has no luck getting in contact with any of the stars. Granny says she's moving back to the hills. Margaret goes to the Clampetts', but is mistakenly frightened off. Jed has Jethro hide the truck. Granny says she'll head back home with her things in a wheelbarrow. Drysdale and Miss Jane tell Gregory that Margaret didn't get the money. Miss Jane suggests that Gregory take some of his dancers to the Clampetts and let Jed see the beauty of their dancing. Jed is confused when he sees the dancers outside. Gregory comes by and Jed misunderstands and thinks the dancers are Gregory's children. Gregory asks for the $190,000 and Jed gives him $40. Insulted, Gregory and the dancers leave. Challenged by Jed, Granny wants Miss Jane to take her to where she can learn to dance the ballet. Miss Jane convinces Gregory to let Granny dance with them. Margaret comes by saying she got Jed's pledge.
83	11	"The Boarder"	Joseph Depew	Paul Henning & Mark Tuttle	December 9, 1964	3–11
The Clampetts decide to turn their spacious mansion into a boarding house. Jed and Jethro place signs all down the road advertising Granny's Boarding House. Drysdale is upset that he has to leave the bank to meet Arthur Pinckney (Arthur Treacher), his new butler. Drysdale and Miss Jane see the signs while driving to his home. It is illegal to take in boarders in this town, so they start to take down the signs. Pinckney mistakenly winds up at the Clampett house. They confuse the butler as their first guest and Arthur mistakes them for the help. Arthur is surprised when he sees Elly's chimp Cousin Bessie hanging from the chandelier dusting it. Arthur wants the family to line up for inspection and they think they're supposed to look him over. Arthur goes to see Drysdale at the bank and says how deplorable his domestic staff is. Drysdale thinks Arthur is talking about his actual staff. Arthur wants permission to make improvements which Drysdale gives. Jethro, Elly and Granny actually like the uniforms Arthur gives them. Jed is not happy about the foot-men's outfit he's to wear. Drysdale and Miss Jane come by the mansion and realize the mix-up. Miss Jane suggests to Drysdale that Arthur stays on, posing as the boarder, so that he can teach the Clampetts how to be more civilized. Arthur does get the family to dress well, but there's always a problem when he tries to dress Jed.
84	12	"The Boarder Stays"	Joseph Depew	Paul Henning & Mark Tuttle	December 16, 1964	3–12
Pinckney goes to the bank and tells Drysdale that he can do no more with the Clampetts. He wants his money and he's leaving the country. Pinckney then proceeds to tell of the things that happened at the mansion. Arthur tries to teach the Clampetts how to play Cricket. They then show Arthur the live crickets that they caught. Arthur explains how he tried to get them to dress better. He gets Elly and Jethro to put on riding clothes and they then go riding in the truck. Arthur has Jed put on a country squires outfit. Granny puts on Jed's other set of squires clothes and complains they're too big. Arthur complains to Drysdale about the food Granny cooked up. Arthur explains that he tried leaving the mansion this morning. Granny thought he was trying to skip without paying his rent. Jed and Jethro catch him. Arthur later managed to escape and he came to the bank. Drysdale and Miss Jane bring Arthur back to the mansion to straighten things out. The Clampetts put Pinckney on trial for skipping out. After Drysdale gives Arthur $1000, he agrees to stay a week and help them around the house. That night, Arthur cooks the dinner. The Clampetts only enjoyed the food when they added their own ingredients to it. Arthur tries to serve them Crêpes Suzette. Jed puts the flame out with water and also gets Arthur all wet. Note: Final screen acting credit of Arthur Treacher, who retired after this performance.
85	13	"Start the New Year Right"	Joseph Depew	Paul Henning & Mark Tuttle	December 30, 1964	3–13
Jed is determined to start the new year off by making friends with Mrs. Drysdale. He sent Granny and Elly over with a gift. They find out that Margaret is in the hospital for a bad case of "nerves". Margaret threatens Milburn that she will stay in the hospital until he gets rid of the Clampetts. She even sent for Dr. Stuyvesant (Les Tremayne), a specialist from New York. Drysdale worries about what this will cost him. Meanwhile, Granny is whipping up some of her nerve tonic for Margaret. Margaret tells Stuyvesant about some of her first encounters with the Clampetts. She then tells him about Elly's pet animals. Stuyvesant is having a hard time believing everything that Margaret is saying. The Doctor leaves Margaret to rest and Jed and Jethro show up. Something the two do causes a tranquilized Margaret to slide out the hospital window. Stuyvesant thinks Margaret is hallucinating when she claims to have seen Jed and Jethro. Now the whole family comes to see Margaret and Elly has her raccoon. They move her bed by the window again. After they leave, Margaret slides out the window again. The family finds her and brings her back to the mansion. Alao guest-starring Sue England as 1st Nurse.
86	14	"Clampett General Hospital"	Joseph Depew	Paul Henning & Mark Tuttle	January 6, 1965	3–14
Miss Jane tries to tell Drysdale that Margaret is not in the hospital and is missing. The Clampetts bring Margaret to the mansion and Granny starts making medicine for her. Mrs. Drysdale wakes up to find she is no longer in the hospital. The family explains that the hospital threw her out the window on a mattress. Margaret is very groggy and wants to leave. At the hospital, Drysdale confronts Dr. Sanders (Willis Bouchey), the Head of the Hospital, about Margaret's disappearance. Jed and Jethro sneak into the hospital to return the mattress. They run into Miss Jane and tell her that Margaret's at the mansion. Miss Jane tries to explain to Drysdale how Margaret wound up out the window. He doesn't believe it and lays on the mattress and slides out the window. He is brought back in with an injured foot. Miss Jane and Dr. Sanders go to get Margaret. Margaret tries to leave the mansion and Granny sedates her with nerve tonic. Miss Jane gets her out and they head back to the hospital. The Clampetts get into the hospital and Miss Jane tries to hide them. The family put on doctors scrubs. With the help of Granny's tonic, the Clampetts sneak both Drysdale and Margaret out again. Miss Jane and Sanders go to the mansion and see the Drysdales frolicking around the front. Also guest-starring Jean Howell as Nurse.
87	15	"The Movie Starlet"	Joseph Depew	Paul Henning & Mark Tuttle	January 13, 1965	3–15
Jethro is infatuated with a young actress named Kitty Devine (Sharon Farrell). His wall is covered with her pictures. Meanwhile, Kitty complains to her agent Jerry Best (Bernie Kopell) that she doesn't want to make another surfer movie. She wants Jerry to talk to the owner of the studio about getting her a serious part to play. Kitty also complains about a big guy that's always waiting for her at the studio gate. The guy turns out to be Jethro. One day when Kitty drives through the gate, Jethro asks her to marry him. She says to get lost and sics a dog on him. Back at the mansion a depressed Jethro says he'll kill himself by starving to death. Granny will give him a love charm and Jed will give him some courting tips. Kitty again tells Jerry to talk to J.D. Clampett. Jerry finds out that Jethro's uncle is Jed and tells her. The Gate Guard (William Newell) tells Kitty that Jethro is here and wants to take her home to meet the family. Kitty now plays up to Jethro and they head to the mansion. Once at the mansion, Kitty starts to chase after Jed. Jerry comes by the mansion and sees Elly in a bathing suit. Jed tries to tell Jethro about love and marriage and all Jethro does is eat. Jerry wants to put Elly in a Surfer Movie.
88	16	"Elly in the Movies"	Joseph Depew	Paul Henning & Mark Tuttle	January 20, 1965	3–16
Elly gets ready to go to the movie studio. Jethro asks Jed if he can produce Elly's movie. Granny is worried about Elly winding up with the wrong Hollywood crowd. She tries to give Elly some weapons to protect herself, but Jed stops her. Jed hopes Elly will meet some handsome movie stars. At the studio, Elly runs into Dash Riprock (Larry Pennell), the star of the movie. Dash doesn't know who she is and thinks she's just an extra. He's quite taken with Elly's beauty and practices a love scene with her by kissing her. Tom Kelly (Bill Quinn), of the studio, tells Dash to go and meet Elly at her dressing room. Tom doesn't know what Elly looks like. He also says to be nice to her because she is the owner's daughter. Drysdale and Miss Jane head to the studio. Miss Jane takes Elly to her dressing room and Drysdale goes to talk to Dash. Drysdale tells Dash to behave around Elly and not to make any moves on her. When Dash gets to Elly's dressing room, out comes Miss Jane. He now believes she is Elly May. Jed takes Granny to the studio to show her it isn't a den of sinners. Dash tells Drysdale that he can't work Elly, still thinking Miss Jane is Elly. Drysdale tells Dash he has to romance Elly. Reluctantly, Dash makes a play for Miss Jane. Also guest-starring Diane Bond as Third Beach Girl.
89	17	"Dash Riprock, You Cad"	Joseph Depew	Paul Henning & Mark Tuttle	January 27, 1965	3–17
Elly is down in the dumps after believing that Dash Riprock jilted her. He mistakenly thought Miss Jane was Elly. Dash was told by Tom Kelly, from the studio, to play up to Elly, so he went after Miss Jane. Jed and Granny can't figure out what Miss Jane has that Elly doesn't. At the bank, Dash apologizes to Drysdale for mistaking Miss Jane for Elly. Jed hopes to cheer Elly up by getting her a date with another actor. He calls Mr. Chapman at the studio and asks him to send someone over. Miss Jane tells Janet Trego that her and Dash are an item. Drysdale tells Dash to keep seeing Miss Jane until he can come up with a way for Dash to let her down gently. Jed tells Elly that Biff Steele is coming to see her. When Biff comes by the mansion he also mistakes Miss Jane for Elly. He relunctantly leaves with Miss Jane. Jed tells Granny that he figures those movie guys don't want to be with someone better looking than they are. Jed decides that the only way Elly can get a man is if she dresses like Miss Jane. Miss Jane tells Dash and Drysdale that she's been with Biff Steele. Dash pretends to leave in a fit of jealousy and goes to see Elly. Dash comes by the mansion and is surprised to see the way Elly is dressed. Biff arrives and brings Bolt Upright (Jack Bannon), Crunch Hardtack, Race Burley and Tab Strong. Also guest-starring Murray Alper as Studio Driver.
90	18	"Clampett A-Go-Go"	Joseph Depew	Robert Schaefer & Eric Freiwald	February 3, 1965	3–18
Elly is still seeing Dash Riprock. They have a date to go to the beach later that day. Because Granny keeps spying on them, Dash asks Elly to meet him later outside the mansion's gate. Meanwhile, Beatnik Sheldon Epps (Alan Reed, Jr.) is at the bank with one of his abstract artworks. Margaret wants Drysdale to by it, but he kicks Sheldon out. Miss Jane give him Margaret's address so he can take the artwork there. Sheldon wrecks his car in front of the Clampett mansion when he is distracted by the sight of Elly in a bathing suit. Jed and Jethro bring Sheldon and his car to the front door. The Clampetts decide to take care of his apparent injuries. The family can't understand his peculiar hipster slang and think he's mentally impaired from the accident. Dash comes by and is about to leave with Elly, when Sheldon talks her into staying to care for him. Sheldon keeps calling Elly a chick so she wants to show him what one really looks like. Jed tells Sheldon that the next day he'll get money from the bank and buy him a new car. Jed tells Drysdale why he needs the money and Drysdale thinks there's a lawsuit coming. Sheldon tells Granny he feels like painting and she brings him a rocking chair to repaint. He gets inspired to paint a picture of Granny in the chair. Jed, Elly and Jethro are startled when they see the abstract painting and want to hide it from Granny. Miss Jane and Drysdale come by. After the painting gets smeared, Miss Jane says it could be worth a lot of money.
91	19	"Granny's Romance"	Joseph Depew	Paul Henning & Mark Tuttle	February 17, 1965	3–19
Mr. Drysdale has decided to get rid of elderly playboy Clifton Cavanaugh (Kent Smith) and give his seat on the bank's Board of Directors to Jed. Hopefully this will hook Jed on the good life and he won't want to move back to the hills. Drysdale is stunned when he sees Miss Jane in a bleached blond wig that she's wearing to impress Jethro. Jed and Jethro arrive at the bank. Drysdale offers Jed the job and says he'll meet a lot of other gentleman at the club. Jed thinks the job would be good for Granny because she could use meeting some men her age. Despite Clifton usually dating women half his age, Drysdale would like him to romance Granny. If he does, he can keep his Board of Directors job. Clifton arrives at the mansion and once he sees Granny he tries to leave. Drysdale comes by and stops him. When Drysdale suggests Clifton take Granny out to dinner, he says he has a date with his "Aunt" Phyllis (Sylvia Lewis). Drysdale says they can double date and Jed can be with Phyllis. That night Clifton picks up Phyllis, who is half his age, and explains why he has to do this date. They arrive at the mansion and everyone is surprised to see how young Phyllis is. Phyllis is not thrilled about this date and driving in the Clampett truck. At the restaurant, Granny and Clifton are dancing and Phyllis is embarrassed. Phyllis' attitude makes a sharp turn when she discovers the extent of Jed's bank account. It is very late and Granny and Clifton are back at the mansion. Jed and Phyllis are still out dancing the night away.
92	20	"Jed's Temptation"	Joseph Depew	Paul Henning & Mark Tuttle	February 24, 1965	3–20
Jed is very sore from dancing all night with gold-digger Phyllis Butterfield. Granny tells him Phyllis is after his money. Phyllis calls and asks Jed if he'd like to go to the horse races. Jed is about to turn her down, but because of something Granny says, he accepts. Phyllis comes by the mansion and because he's so sore, Jed can barely get into her little car. They go to the bank and Drysdale is happy to see Jed all dressed up and with Phyllis. But then Jed asks for a big sack of money. Granny wants to go to the races to bring Jed back. Drysdale and Miss Jane pull up and tell Granny that, after doing some research, they found out that Phyllis is after Jed's money. They go to get Jed. At the track, Jed is having a lot of luck picking the winning horses. Sitting behind them is Fred (Don Rickles) and his wife Marge (Iris Adrian). Fred is only picking losers. When Fred picks another loser, he and Marge get into a fight. Jed suggests to Phyllis that they leave and go shopping for Phyllis. Granny is brought to where Jed was sitting by an usher. Marge leaves. Granny mistakes Fred for someone who needs money for food and offers to give him some. Fred finally picks a winner and offers Granny half of his money. This gets Granny into gambling with Fred and they start picking winners. At the mansion, Jed tells Elly that he knows Phyllis is a gold-digger, but he's spending time with her so Granny can says she was right. Granny comes home very sad. Drysdale tells Jed that she won several races but then lost it all on the last race.
93	21	"Double Naught Jethro"	Joseph Depew	Paul Henning & Mark Tuttle	March 3, 1965	3–21
After seeing a spy movie, Jethro gives up wanting to be a brain surgeon and decides to become a "double naught" spy. Rival banker John Cushing (Roy Roberts) comes by to see Drysdale. John brings along Mabel Slocum (Joyce Nizzari), who will be his entry for the Queen of the Banker's Ball. She is wearing an overcoat and looks quite plain. Drysdale double's his bet with John. He then sees Mabel in her bathing suit and she is very beautiful. Drysdale doesn't believe that she actually works at John's bank. Jethro comes by asking if Drysdale has any spy work for him to do. Instead of getting some groceries for Granny, Jethro's been looking around town for a spy supply store. Elly wants to be a spy as well. At the bank, Drysdale is trying to find an attractive female employee with no luck. Drysdale's last hope is secretary Janet Trego, but he learns she broke her leg in a skiing accident. Drysdale hires Elly to fill in for Janet and enter the contest. Jethro is spying on Mabel at Cushing's bank. In John's office, Jethro knocks himself out when he puts on his iron hat. John learns that Jed is Jethro's uncle. Jethro has converted the family's truck into his idea of a Bond-mobile. Jethro brings Mabel to the mansion and she wants to talk to Jed about his money. Granny gets into the truck and winds up in a tree when she sits in the ejector seat.
94	22	"Clampett's Millions"	Joseph Depew	Paul Henning & Mark Tuttle	March 10, 1965	3–22
Jethro is still trying to be a "double naught" spy. Elly beats out Mabel Slocum to win the Queen of the Banker's Ball contest. At the bank, Harry Barth (John Alvin), a photographer, is taking pictures of Elly. Drysdale keeps trying to get into the picture. Jethro goes to see Cushing and asks if he needs any spying work done. Jed is with and John starts to butter him up. Jed invites John and Mabel over for lunch. At the mansion, John woos Granny and then invites the Clampetts to dinner. John comes by Drysdale's bank to pay off his bet. John mentions that he's after a new account and Drysdale wishes him luck. The next day, Granny asks Jed if he's going to put his money in John's bank. John comes by and brings Granny some flowers and candy for Elly. After John leaves, Granny says she wants to put her share of the money in John's bank. Granny goes to the Commerce bank and asks Drysdale for her money, but he tries to put her off. Jed comes by and tells Drysdale to give Granny the money. Drysdale says he doesn't have $11 million in cash and Granny says he spent it. He tries to explain that the money is invested in various things. Cushing comes by and succeeds in getting Drysdale to transfer all of their money to his bank. But, when John can't show them it all in cash, they decide to put the money back with Drysdale.
95	23	"Drysdale's Dog Days"	Joseph Depew	Paul Henning & Mark Tuttle	March 17, 1965	3–23
Jethro can't find where he can go to join up to be a "double naught" spy. Granny wants to know to the penny what her share of Jed's money is. She'll then take it out of Drysdale's bank and put it in her mattress. Elly is teaching her dog Arnie tricks so she can enter him in Mrs. Drysdale's dog show. Granny calls Drysdale and tells him she wants her money in cash. At the bank, Miss Jane suggests to Drysdale that they show Granny how much space $1 million would take up. Hopefully, that will discourage her. Drysdale will get the money from the Federal Reserve on credit. Margaret comes by and says her poodle Claude has just come from the psychiatrist. Claude has a neurosis because Drysdale constantly rejects him. Jed and Granny come by and misunderstand when Drysdale wants Claude to stay out. They think Drysdale meant them and leave. The armored car with the money comes by the bank and Drysdale gets in and they head to the Clampetts. They get to the mansion and Granny shoots rock salt at the truck. Back at the bank, Drysdale tells Miss Jane that Granny took the money and wants the other $10 million. Margaret comes by and Claude is in worse shape because Drysdale said Elly could enter her dog. Granny is stuffing the money in her mattress. Drysdale and Miss Jane bring Claude to the mansion wanting Granny to doctor the dog. Elly is concerned that Claude doesn't know any tricks. She decides to help out by substituting Arnie for Claude at the show. She tries to make Arnie look like a poodle so Margaret will win the prize. When Margaret sees Arnie at the show, she faints. Also guest-starring Grandon Rhodes as Dog Show Judge and Steve Brodie as Armored Car Guard.
96	24	"Brewster's Honeymoon"	Joseph Depew	Paul Henning & Mark Tuttle	March 24, 1965	3–24
Drysdale gets a telegram from John Brewster (Frank Wilcox), the oilman from Tulsa, saying more oil was discovered on Jed's land. He's flying in to have Jed sign a new lease. John's fiancé Edythe Williams (Lisa Seagram) will meet him there to get married. Drysdale shows John the Clampett mansion from a helicopter. Granny is homesick for the hills again. Jed decides to put up the cabin in the backyard again. Drysdale, John and Edythe arrive at the mansion. John tells Jed he's getting married that afternoon and that Edythe was a New York decorator. All Drysdale cares about is getting the leases signed. Jed tells John and Edythe how he spent his honeymoon in a cabin like the one in the yard. Somehow Jed and Granny get the idea that the cabin is the ideal place for the Brewsters to stay. The Clampetts decorate their truck with just married signs. After they are married, Jed and Jethro drive the Brewsters in the truck and Edythe is quite embarrassed. Instead of going to the hotel, Jed says he has a surprise for them and takes them to the cabin. The Brewsters don't want to insult the Clampetts, so they stay in the cabin. Every time they try to sneak out during the night, they fall into the swimming pool.
97	25	"Flatt, Clampett, and Scruggs"	Joseph Depew	Paul Henning & Mark Tuttle	March 31, 1965	3–25
Granny still has a bad case of homesick blues. It is so bad that Jethro has to cook for himself. Lester Flatt and Earl Scruggs are in town for a performance at the Oak Room. The Stage Manager (Frank J. Scannell) tries calling the Clampett home on behalf of Lester and Earl. But he keeps having a confusing conversation with Jethro. Jethro wants Miss Jane to come over and cook for him. She thinks he's interested in rommance. Jed tells Granny that Miss Jane will be using her kitchen, hoping that will get her fired up. But it doesn't work. Lester and Earl arrive at the mansion. They play a song for Granny and it does cheer her up. When they play another song, Granny, Jed and Elly start dancing. Meanwhile, Miss Jane is cooking for Jethro. When she mentions making plans for their nuptials, Jethro doesn't know what she's talking about. Granny sings a song with Lester and Earl. Lester suggests to Jed that Granny perform with them at the Oak Room. Miss Jane's attempt at making one of Granny's recipes is a failure. That night, everyone is surprised to see an all dolled up Granny, in long blonde hair and tight dress, perform with Lester and Earl.
98	26	"Jed and the Countess"	Joseph Depew	Paul Henning & Mark Tuttle	April 14, 1965	3–26
Granny is upset because she can't get the ingredients she needs to make her spring tonic at any local drug store. Thanks to Cousin Pearl mailing her the ingredients, Granny can make her tonic. Countess Maria (Jean Willes) arrives at the bank and she wants to see the Clampetts. She's here to get some of Granny's new batch of spring tonic. Miss Jane asks Maria how her Chauffeur Humphrey (Burt Mustin) is. Last year after having some of the tonic, Maria married Humphrey. But she lost him at their wedding reception. Drysdale tells the Clampetts that Countess Maria will be coming by to see them. He has some tonic and it really hits him. Granny thinks Maria's looking for a new husband and that Jed is her perfect match. Maria arrives at the mansion and gives Jed a big hug. Jethro drives Maria to get her car out of storage. They come back with her limousine. Maria agrees to let Jethro chauffeur her around while she's in town. After a misunderstanding, Jed and Granny think the Countess wants to marry Jethro. Jed decides to make a play for Maria. He gives her some tonic and asks to talk to her. Miss Janes comes by the mansion with long lost Humphery. And with the help of some tonic, Humphery takes the Countess away.
99	27	"Big Daddy, Jed"	Joseph Depew	Robert Schaefer & Eric Freiwald	April 21, 1965	3–27
Beatnik Sheldon Epps (Alan Reed, Jr.) brings some of his friends to the Clampett mansion. Sheldon asks Elly if Jed is around, but he's hunting. The rent is due on the beatniks coffee house and Sheldon wanted to get it from Jed. Drysdale owns the building that the coffee house is in and they decide to go talk to him. Meanwhile, Granny complains to Jed that all Jethro does now is walk around in the uniform that Countess Maria bought for him. At the bank, Drysdale tells Sheldon that he's doubling the rent and kicks them out of his office. Sheldon goes back to the Clampetts. Because they don't understand his hip lingo, Granny gives him a basket of actual bread, not money. Jed finally figures out what Sheldon wants and gives him a roll of money. He also asks if Jethro could work at the coffee house. Sheldon pays Drysdale and he wonders where Sheldon got the money. Jethro comes by the coffee house and the beatniks initially think he's some kind of mounted police because of his uniform. Beatnik Squirrel (Marianne Gaba) thinks Jethro's cute and she'll get him to become "cool". Jethro and the beatniks come to the mansion and Jethro shows off his new "threads". Elly wants to be a beatnik also. Elly, Jethro and the others are dancing at the club. Drysdale tells Miss Jane that he's turning off the power to the club. Jed and Granny come by the coffee house and just then the power goes out. Drysdale and Miss Jane come by and the place is still open. Jed found a way to light up the place. Drysdale finds out that Jed is the one sponsoring the beatniks. He and Miss Jane then start dancing with the others. Also guest-starring Paul De Rolf as Beatnik Horace.
100	28	"Cool School is Out"	Joseph Depew	Paul Henning & Mark Tuttle	April 28, 1965	3–28
Drysdale still wants to find a way to shut down the beatniks Parthenon West coffee house. Jethro and Elly are still acting like beatniks. At the Parthenon West, Squirrel has made an avant-garde sculpture of Jethro out of clay. Elly thinks she can do better and just smashes the clay. Everyone thinks what Elly created is a masterpiece. Granny comes by and wants Jethro to go home and do his chores. While he's getting the truck, Granny goes back in to get Elly. Granny tells the beatniks they should be doing chores. They don't understand what she means. When Granny tries to show them how to dig "taters", they think she's created a new dance. Granny starts to enjoy dancing with the beatniks. Drysdale tries to convince Jed that the beatniks are no good, but Jed likes a lot of their ideals. Drysdale, Miss Jane and Jed see Jethro drive up with a beatnik girl. The girl turns out to be Granny and she's talking the hip lingo. Jed decides the beatniks may have to go. Jed goes to talk to Sheldon. With another roll of money, Jed manages to convince Sheldon to help bring the three back to normal. When Granny and Jethro come back to the coffee house, it is all prim and formal. All the beatniks are in suits and dresses and dancing to a waltz.
101	29	"The Big Bank Battle"	Joseph Depew	Paul Henning & Mark Tuttle	May 5, 1965	3–29
Granny mentions to Jed how good he is at fixing things. Drysdale is appalled to learn that Jed is going door-to-door peddling his services as a handyman to keep busy. Drysdale has a meeting with rival John Cushing and John mentions taking the Clampett account away from Drysdale. John shows Drysdale a ship in a bottle that's John's hobby. It took him 3 years to build it. Drysdale then tries to get Jed involved in a hobby and shows him the bottle. Jed doesn't understand why someone would want to build a boat inside a bottle. Jethro tells Drysdale that he got the boat out of the bottle. Drysdale and Miss Jane try to suggest other hobbies for Jed, but he's not interested. Jed wants to continue offering his services to people. When Jed finds out what Jethro did, he goes to see Cushing to apologize. Even John is surprised when Jed tells him about his handyman service. Because Jed wants to keep busy, John offers him a job as Vice President of Farm Loans. Jed gets an office with Roberta Graham (Sue Casey) as his secretary. Drysdale becomes furious when he learns about Jed's job and he confronts Cushing. Drysdale offers to Jed the same job at his bank. Jed doesn't want Drysdale and Cushing fighting over him. He decides the whole family will drive around in their truck and each member offers a different service.
102	30	"The Clampetts Versus Automation"	Joseph Depew	Paul Henning & Mark Tuttle	May 12, 1965	3–30
The Clampetts are having no luck getting any work while driving around in their "Fix-It" truck. Granny wants to go back to the hills. Meanwhile, timid bookkeeper Leroy Lester (Byron Foulger), a longtime employee of the Commerce Bank, is being forcibly retired to make way for a new computer system. Miss Jane tries to talk Drysdale into keeping Leroy employed, but it doesn't work. Leroy drives to the Drysdale home to balance Margaret's checkbook. Jethro brings Leroy to the mansion because he was having car trouble. They invite him in to eat with them. Drysdale somehow believes that Leroy is a playboy embezzler. Leroy tells the Clampetts how he lost his job. While Jethro and Elly work on his car, Granny gives Leroy some liquid courage. Granny and Jed decide to not leave for the hills and help Leroy instead. They invite Leroy to stay with them for a while. Miss Jane tells Drysdale that Leroy's books balanced to the penny. Leroy goes back to the bank, where Drysdale's computer has now died. Drysdale offers Leroy his job back, but Leroy informs Drysdale that he will be taking an extended vacation and staying with his new friends, the Clampetts. Jed tells Drysdale that he can have Jethro as his bookkeeper.
103	31	"The Brewsters Return"	Joseph Depew	Paul Henning & Mark Tuttle	May 19, 1965	3–31
John and Edythe Brewster come by the bank. They tell Drysdale and Miss Jane they don't want the Clampetts to know they're in town. They recall how embarrassed they were when they were picked up from the airport the last visit. And then were driven around in the wedding decorated truck. Plus they had to spend their honeymoon in the Clampetts little cabin. The Brewsters have purchased a lot in Beverly Hills where they will build their dream home. Jed and Granny tell Drysdale that they're going back to the hills for a visit and want their money sent there. To keep them in town, Drysdale tells them the Brewsters are in town. Jed decides not to leave and will visit with John and Edythe. Drysdale tells John that the Clampetts know they're in town. In order for the Brewsters to be able to build their dream home, Drysdale finds a way for John to take Edythe to the Clampetts' cabin. Edythe is having a miserable time with Granny teaching her hillbilly ways to "set up housekeeping". Miss Jane tries to tell Jed that the Brewsters have a lot where they want their dream home. Jed misunderstands and has the cabin moved to the Brewster lot.
104	32	"Luke's Boy"	Joseph Depew	Paul Henning & Mark Tuttle	May 26, 1965	3–32
Beauregard Short (Robert Easton) is soon to arrive in Beverly Hills from back home. Granny thinks he's coming to ask Elly to marry him. Miss Jane comes by and Granny and Jed tell her how all the girls went crazy for Beau. Beau shows up and he's not the handsome man Miss Jane expected. Miss Jane goes to get Elly and she's made herself up to look ugly. Elly says she wants nothing to do with Beau. To turn Beau off, Miss Jane has Elly get all dolled up, because Beau is afraid of Hollywood sirens. The plan doesn't work because Beau likes the way Elly looks. Beau asks Granny if she thinks Elly really wants to get married. Elly tells Jed and Miss Jane that she never liked Beau and they agree to get Elly out of her problem. Jed tries to discourage Beau by giving him some of Elly's rock hard biscuits, but he likes them. Miss Jane tells Beau he would break so many hearts if he were to get married. So, Jethro decides to show him how to be like him, an international playboy. Jethro and Beau stand in front of Drysdale's bank trying to pick up women with no luck. Miss Jane talks the boys into going back to the bank and trying again. At the bank, Miss Jane has two secretaries pretend to fall for the boys. Jethro and Beau bring the ladies back to the mansion to go swimming. Jed calls Beau father, Luke, and finds out that the real reason Beau is in town is to be inducted into the Army. Also guest-starring Chanin Hale as Linda Curry and Edy Williams as Girl.
105	33	"Jed, the Bachelor"	Joseph Depew	Paul Henning & Mark Tuttle	June 2, 1965	3–33
Granny is determined to go back home even if she has to walk back all by herself. Granny sets off for the hills with nothing but a wheelbarrow full of her possessions. Jed decides to teach her a lesson and let her go, figuring she won't get far. Jethro tells Jed he's going down to the bank to continue being a sophisticated international playboy. Jethro is in front of the bank and complains to Miss Jane and Drysdale that none of the women seem interested in him. Not wanting Jethro to leave town either, Drysdale plans to get another secretary to pretend to fall for him. A Police Officer (Ray Kellogg) and a plain-clothes Policewoman pull up to the bank. They were told about a masher there and hope to entrap Jethro. Jethro gets arrested. A truck driver (Peter Leeds) gives Granny a lift to just outside of Las Vegas. Jethro calls Jed and tells him he's in jail. Drysdale and Miss Jane get Jethro out of jail. Jethro is fed up and says he's going back to the hills. Granny gets to the Las Vegas city limits and all she sees is desert. She gets to a casino and calls Jed saying she wants to come home. Drysdale has Granny flown back. Drysdale gives Jethro a made up job at the bank with secretaries. Jethro gets arrested by the Policewoman when he tries to take his secretaries home for lunch. Granny comes up with a reason to go back to Las Vegas.
106	34	"The Art Center"	Joseph Depew	Paul Henning & Mark Tuttle	June 9, 1965	3–34
Mrs. Drysdale hopes to get the Clampetts to move out and change the mansion into the Margaret Drysdale Art Center. Margaret talks Jed into the Art Center by saying that he would be pleasuring a lot of people and the city would do all the maintenance in the house. Jed does misunderstand something Margaret says and thinks she just wants the family to fill many of the rooms with artwork of their own. Meanwhile, Drysdale really likes the new doctor he's seen and is told he's in perfect health. Margaret needs to get Milburn out of town for a while so he doesn't know what she's doing to the Clampetts. She comes by the bank and convinces Drysdale that he's in poor health and needs a vacation. Jethro tells the family about different artists he learned about in school including "Mike Angelo". Elly will make mud sculptures and Jethro will get a rock and chisel a masterpiece. Jed and Granny will begin painting. Margaret goes to see George Engel (Walter Woolf King), the Fine Arts Chairman. A frail Drysdale goes to see the Clampetts to say goodbye before he leaves for Palm Springs. As he's leaving, Jed mentions the Art Center to Drysdale but it doesn't sink in. Elly sculpts a possum out of clay. Granny is painting daisies all over the house and Jethro brings home a massive rock. Jethro hires a beautiful model to pose for him. But he tells Jed he's sculpting a possum. Margaret and George come by the mansion and see all of the Clampett artwork. Jethro brings home another large rock, but it rolls off the truck and onto George's car. Note: This episode is the final one to be filmed in black-and-white.

=== Season 4 (1965–66) ===
All episodes from Season 4 onwards now filmed in color

No. overall	No. in season	Title	Directed by	Written by	Original release date	Prod. code
107	1	"Admiral Jed Clampett"	Joseph Depew	Paul Henning & Mark Tuttle	September 15, 1965	4–1
Granny's fear of sharks makes her reluctant to go yachting with the rest of the family. At the mansion, Drysdale tells Miss Jane he would like Jed to buy a yacht and join a yacht club. There would be a lot of young men for Elly at the club. Jethro gets a yachting outfit for Jed, but he accidentally acquired an Admiral's uniform instead. The family heads off to meet Drysdale and Miss Jane at the yacht harbor, but mistakenly wind up at a Naval ship yard. Jed's uniform causes confusion when he boards a Navy ship he believes to be the yacht Drysdale wants him to buy. Jed tells the Lieutenant (David Frankham) he would like to take the ship out to sea. Meanwhile, Drysdale and Miss Jane are driving all over the yacht harbor looking for the Clampetts. They want to hire a Speedboat Operator (Ray Kellogg) to take them around the harbor, but he charges more than Drysdale wants to spend. Instead, Drysdale has Miss Jane row a little boat around. Jethro asks the Helmsman (Frank Coghlan Jr.) if he could steer the ship. After Jethro makes a wild turn, the Lieutenant puts the Helmsman back in charge. The Lieutenant then shows the family the fire power of the ship. Back at port, Jethro tells Jed how much it would cost to buy and maintain the boat. Jed tells the Lieutenant he'll pass on the boat and the Lieutenant thinks Jed means the ship passed the inspection. Note: This is the first episode filmed and aired in color; and also the first episode in which Donna Douglas as Elly May takes over the Filmways Presentation announcement at the end of the show.
108	2	"That Old Black Magic"	Joseph Depew	Ronny Pearlman	September 22, 1965	4–2
Drysdale has a bird that he wants to give to Elly for her birthday. The bird has started to mimick Margaret. Margaret is into astrology and the stars tell her she should make friends with her neighbors. When Margaret tries to explain astrology to Granny and Jed, Granny thinks Margaret is practicing black magic. Back at her house, Margaret is tired of the bird and lets it out of its cage. Granny thinks black magic has turned Mrs. Drysdale into that bird. Granny brings the bird home and tries to cure Margaret. She tells Jethro about the bird being Margaret and he suggests she take it to a "critter doctor". Granny calls Dr. Abbott (John Gallaudet), a Veterinarian, but he's not in the office just then. Jethro takes Granny to a medical building. When Granny tells an Elevator Starter (Dave Willock) that the bird is Mrs. Drysdale, he directs her to Dr. Reimer (Tris Coffin), a Psychiatrist. Dr. Abbott calls back and talks to Jed about the bird called Mrs. Drysdale. Jed misunderstands Abbott and puts Margaret in a cage. Granny gets confusing advice from Dr. Reimer. Granny then has a confusing conversation with Drysdale when she brings the bird to him. Margaret realizes that she had her dates mixed up and she doesn't have to be friendly to the Clampetts.
109	3	"The Sheik"	Joseph Depew	Paul Henning & Mark Tuttle	September 29, 1965	4–3
Drysdale and Jed are going to be on TV and meet another oil millionaire, Sheik Ahmed (Dan Seymour), from an Arab kingdom. John Brewster's (Frank Wilcox) OK Oil Company is brokering a deal with the Sheik. The program goes off the air before Drysdale can make his speech. Back at the mansion, Jethro brings in 4 Harem Girls that are a gift to Jed from the Sheik. Jed wants Jethro to get a hold of Drysdale so he can return the girls. Drysdale and Brewster are worried about offending the Sheik. Ahmed arrives at the mansion and immediately falls for Elly. John tries to tell Ahmed that while Jed appreciates his gift, Jed has nothing of equal value to gift to him. The Sheik tries to make a deal for Elly, but Jed refuses. Without Jed knowing, Jethro makes a deal with the Sheik. At the bank, Drysdale calls Brewster and says that they could try and substitute Miss Jane for Elly. But when Drysdale sees Miss Jane in a Harem outfit, he changes his mind. Granny tells Jed that the Sheik made off with Elly, but Jed says he saw the Sheik by the swimming pool. It is really Jethro dressed as a sheik by the pool with the 4 Harem Girls. Jethro tells Jed about the deal he made with the Sheik for Elly. It is not long before Elly returns with the Sheik locked in the trunk of his car. Also starring Phil Gordon as Reporter and Diane Bond and Nai Bonet as Harem Girls.
110	4	"The Private Eye"	Joseph Depew	Paul Henning & Mark Tuttle	October 6, 1965	4–4
Jethro is anxious to become a "Double Naught" spy but doesn't know where to join up. Jed suggests he open an office in town. To keep Jed happy, Drysdale gives Jethro an office at the bank. Drysdale mentions that Jethro's office is directly over the bank vault. Jed tells Jethro that Elly will be his secretary. Vincent Baker (Donald Curtis), the man who was to originally get Jethro's office, arrives at the bank. Miss Jane tries to explain to Vincent about Jethro. What Miss Jane doesn't know is that Vincent is planning on breaking into the vault. Kaye Martin (Eileen O'Neill), Vince's partner, is worried about Jethro ruining their plan. Vincent tells Elly that he's from the London Spy Headquarters. Vincent hopes to con an unwitting Jethro into helping him get into the vault. Jethro's clumsiness, however, proves to be the robber's undoing. Also guest-starring Paul Bryar as the Detective.
111	5	"Possum Day"	Joseph Depew	Paul Henning & Mark Tuttle	October 13, 1965	4–5
The Clampetts will be heading back to the hills for Possum Day. Granny wants to run for the title of Possum Queen. Mrs. Drysdale comes by as she will be taking care of the mansion while the family is away. The Clampetts are surprised that there is no Possum Day in Beverly Hills. After they get in the truck and drive away, Margaret puts up a For Sale sign. Drysdale comes back from a trip early and sees what Margaret is up to. He finds out that the Clampetts were going to the hills. When he gets to the bank, Jed and Granny are there to say goodbye. Drysdale tells them that there will be a huge Possum Day celebration here in town. The family decides to stay. Granny thinks that Margaret was willing for them to leave town so she could be Possum Queen. After a call from Jed, Drysdale "volunteers" his wife as Granny's challenger for the title. Problems arise when Miss Jane tells Drysdale that the city will not hold the Possum festival. Drysdale goes to city hall and has no luck changing their minds. He then tries to pitch the idea of the festival to other cities, but gets nowhere. Granny starts campaigning for Possum Queen. Also guest-starring Sharon Tate as Janet Trego.
112	6	"The Possum Day Parade"	Joseph Depew	Paul Henning & Mark Tuttle	October 20, 1965	4–6
Granny and Jed wonder why Mrs. Drysdale hasn't started campaigning for Possum Queen. Drysdale is still having no luck finding a town to hold the Possum Day festival. Miss Jane thinks he should just tell the Clampeets the truth while there's still time for them to go back to the hills. Unbeknownst to Margaret, Drysdale starts to run a campaign for her against Granny. Drysdale buys some radio time and plays an edited tape of Margaret insulting Granny. Granny is furious. The Clampetts hold a campaign rally in the bank's parking lot. Margaret drives up. When she gets out of her limousine, she sees the Possum Queen signs on the doors of her car that Drysdale put on there. The next day, Drysdale comes to the bank and tells Miss Jane he found no town to hold the festival. Granny thinks that Margaret really wants to be Possum Queen. She tells Jed she's withdrawing from the race. Drysdale and Miss Jane come by the mansion. Drysdale is about to tell the Clampetts the truth about the festival. When Granny says that she's not even going into town to see the festival, Drysdale pretends it is still happening. Also guest-starring George Holmes as Rally Spectator.
113	7	"The Clampetts Play the Rams"	Joseph Depew	Paul Henning & Mark Tuttle	October 27, 1965	4–7
Jethro thinks the Drysdales' attractive young maid Linda Curry (Nina Shipman) is interested in him and commences courting her. But she just wants to watch the football game on the Clampetts' big color TV. Jed and Granny are surprised when 3 other women arrive to sit in the "courting parlor" with Linda and Jethro. Because the women just wanted to watch football, Jethro doesn't think Linda loves him anymore and he wants to end it all. Jed suggests that Jethro needs to learn how to play football to win Linda over. Drysdale and Miss Jane come by the mansion so Drysdale can show them how to play football. It is not long before Drysdale injures himself. Linda tries to talk Drysdale into buying a new color TV so she can watch hockey. The Clampetts are dressed up in football uniforms and Jethro goes out to catch the ball and runs into a wall. Linda asks Jethro if she can come by that evening. He agrees as long as she doesn't just watch a football game. The next day Jethro wants to end it all again because Linda just came by to watch hockey. Jed suggests he learn how to play hockey. Jed tells Drysdale that Jethro is in love with Linda. Drysdale tells Linda if she is nice to Jethro, he'll buy her a new color TV.
114	8	"The Courtship of Elly"	Joseph Depew	Paul Henning & Mark Tuttle	November 3, 1965	4–8
Granny's concocts a love potion for Elly because she's getting past her prime age. Meanwhile, Drysdale has hired a professional escort, Dean Peters (Van Williams), to be Elly's date. Miss Jane discovers that Dean is actually a very intelligent person and they have common interests. Granny also gives Elly a spell to get a man. Jed goes to the bank and sees Miss Jane and Dean together and figures she has a new boyfriend. Drysdale tells Jed that he guarantees that Elly will get a man. Dean comes by the mansion. Granny has Elly dressed up as a little girl to show Dean she is still in her courting prime. Dean and Elly play little kid games. Jed tells Granny that Dean is Miss Jane's man. Granny tries a reverse spell that apparently doesn't work. To get Miss Jane another man, Jed forces Jethro to go and court her. Miss Jane goes to the mansion to straighten things out. Dean is worn out from playing hopscotch with Elly and wants to leave. Granny has Elly get dressed up real fancy to show Dean how old she really is. To get Dean and Miss Jane back together, Granny has her dress as a little girl.
115	9	"A Real Nice Neighbor"	Joseph Depew	Paul Henning & Mark Tuttle	November 10, 1965	4–9
Jed mentions to Granny that they have new neighbors and they should say hello. Jed and Granny mistake the new neighbor's maidservant Agnes (Kathleen Freeman) for the owner, Mrs. Philip Brentwood Carrington III. When Drysdale hears who's moving in, he wants to set Jed up with the rich widow. Granny visits with Agnes and is impressed that, for a rich woman, she does so much work around the mansion. Granny talk up Agnes to Jed. Drysdale wants Miss Jane to start playing cupid with Jed and Agnes. Drysdale gives Jed a bunch of presents that he's to give to Agnes. But Jed misunderstands and thinks Drysdale is giving the presents to him. Drysdale really talks up Mrs. Carrington to Jed. Jed as usual, isn't interested. Agnes winds up having a little too much of Granny's "rheumatism medicine". A drunk Agnes starts dancing with Drysdale. Mrs. Carrington's Chauffeur (William Bakewell) comes by and reveals who Anges really is.
116	10	"The Poor Farmer"	Joseph Depew	Paul Henning & Mark Tuttle	November 17, 1965	4–10
Jethro is experimenting with his chemistry set in the kitchen. He thinks he's invented a pill that turns water into gasoline. Jed heads to the bank to meet with Fleming Pendleton (Lester Matthews) and John Canady (William Forrest). They will be talking about investing in a project to farm the ocean started by billionaire Lucas Sebastian (Sebastian Cabot). Jethro's pill doesn't work and he and Jed are stranded on the road. Lucas arrives and when Drysdale offers him some caviar, Lucas says he's on a diet. Lucas makes his presentation. Fleming and John overhear something that Miss Jane says and believe Jed is on to a new discovery. They would rather invest with Jed and leave. Jed finally arrives and Miss Jane tells him to meet Lucas at a club down the street. In the massage room at the club, Jed comes to believe that Lucas is a poor farmer who hasn't eaten in days. Jed admires the man's unwillingness to accept Jed's charity. Jed also thinks that Joe Leigh (Hal Baylor), the massage therapist, is mistreating Lucas. Jed misunderstands something Joe says and knocks him out.
117	11	"Hoe Down a-Go-Go"	Joseph Depew	Paul Henning & Mark Tuttle	November 24, 1965	4–11
Jethro asks Jed how to get a girl and Elly asks Granny how to get a boy. Jed and Granny are concerned the young'uns aren't meeting anyone so they decide to throw a wing ding. Miss Jane tells Drysdale what Jed wants and she is put in charge of the music. Miss Jane takes Jethro to the Whisky a Go Go to listen to some bands. She and Jethro wind up dancing to the wild music. The next day, Drysdale tells the Clampetts that he'll get all the country decorations they want for the wing ding. Miss Jane ends up hiring rock and roll band (Cory Wells & The Enemys) and brings them to the mansion that night. Elly thinks Miss Jane brought 4 girls with her because of their long hair. The older Clampetts are confused because they were expecting a country music group. A mix between a square dance and rockfest ensues.
118	12	"Mrs. Drysdale's Father"	Joseph Depew	Paul Henning & Mark Tuttle	December 1, 1965	4–12
Mr. Lowell Farquar (Charlie Ruggles), Margaret's father, comes for a visit. When he's alone with Drysdale, he reveals he's broke. It seems on his way over, he passed through Las Vegas and lost his whole fortune. Lowell asks Drysdale for a handout, which Milburn refuses. Margaret warns her Father about the Clampetts, but then she mentions the millions they have. Lowell hopes to get some of their money so he can go back to Las Vegas. Jethro carries Lowell over to the mansion. Hoping to win some money, Lowell teaches Jed and Granny how to play poker, but Granny keeps winning. Lowell then teaches Jed how to play pool and Jed becomes quite good at it. Drysdale comes over worried that Lowell has taken the Clampetts money. He is relieved to see that didn't happen. Also guest-starring Arthur Gould-Porter as Ravenswood.
119	13	"Mr. Farquhar Stays On"	Joseph Depew	Paul Henning & Mark Tuttle	December 8, 1965	4–13
Lowell Redlings Farquhar is still visiting and Granny is interested in him. Lowell asks Drysdale for some money and is turned down again. Lowell goes to talk to Granny but is interrupted by Margaret. He has plans for Granny, her money, and her gambling acumen in Las Vegas. As he's about to ask Granny to take the trip with him, he is again interrupted by Margaret. Granny thinks he wants to elope to Las Vegas with her. Lowell is at the bank and Drysdale finds out about his plan to go gambling with Granny. Jed and Elly come by the bank and tell Drysdale how happy Granny is with Lowell around. Lowell thinks that Jed is OK with him taking Granny gambling and Jed thinks Lowell wants to marry Granny. They bring Lowell back to the mansion. Granny has changed her mind about marrying Lowell and goes to tell him. Lowell explains that he wanted her money to go gambling. Lowell asks Jed to go to Las Vegas with him.
120	14	"Military School"	Joseph Depew	Paul Henning & Mark Tuttle	December 15, 1965	4–14
Jethro now wants to be a five-star General and wants to go to West Point. Drysdale decides the safest idea is to get him into Havenhurst, a local boys military academy. Drysdale tells Jed and Jethro that he'll set things up and sends Miss Jane to get it done. Granny thinks that Jethro has had enough schooling. Miss Jane has no luck at the academy so Drysdale goes. At the school, Colonel G. T. Hollis (John Hoyt) speaks with a young Captain Hogan about the upcoming war games with rival academy Lexington. Hollis tells Drysdale that he wants to personally interview Jethro, thinking he's a young boy. Drysdale has Jethro dress as a little school boy. Hollis discovers that the Clampett estate is adjacent to the upcoming war game site. As they have lost to Lexington 9 years in a row, Hollis believes using Jed's land would give him a tactical advantage. He lets Jethro join. Elly is looking forward to meeting Jethro's military guys, thinking they will be older. Jed and Granny see all the young boys and learn that they will defend Beverly Hills from the Lexington Army. This mock battle has Granny and Jed confused. Also guest-starring Craig Huxley as Cadet.
121	15	"The Common Cold"	Joseph Depew	Paul Henning & Mark Tuttle	December 29, 1965	4–15
Dr. Granny is giving the family their twice a year examination. Miss Jane comes by to have papers signed and mentions that Mr. Drysdale has a cold. Granny claims to have a cure for the common cold. Meanwhile, Drysdale is unhappy with Dr. Clyburn's (Fred Clark) treatment of his cold. Granny mixes up a batch of her cold cure for Drysdale. Thinking Drysdale is still with Dr. Clyburn, the family goes to his office. After Granny questions Mr. Parker (Thomas Browne Henry), a patient in the waiting room, Clyburn kicks her out. Jed and Granny go to the bank and ask Drysdale if he has a vacant office so Granny can set up her medical practice. Miss Jane is worried about Granny practicing medicine without a license. Drysdale figures she'll give up when no patients come to see her. When no one shows up, Granny decides to go to Clyburn's office and get some of his patients. Booth (Olan Soule), a drug salesman, is at Clyburn's office. Clyburn tells Booth he doesn't have time to see him. Granny overhears and thinks Booth is a patient that Clyburn is turning away. Granny and Jethro bring Booth to her office. Clyburn goes to Granny's office and Booth says he's been made a distributor for Granny's cold cure. Clyburn and Booth learn that there's nothing special about Granny's cure.
122	16	"The Richest Woman"	Joseph Depew	Paul Henning & Mark Tuttle	January 5, 1966	4–16
Tracy Richards (Martha Hyer), the world's richest woman, likes the Clampett mansion and wants to buy it. Jed is surprised when Tracy just walks into the house. She tells her secretary Doug (Douglass Dumbrille) some of the changes she wants to make. Tracy and Doug leave as quickly as they came. They go to the bank and Miss Jane tells them that Drysdale is out of town. Tracy learns that the hillbillies she met earlier are the Clampetts. Tracy goes back to the mansion and has a frustrating conversation with Jed. Doug gets some information about the Clampett family that Tracy hopes to use. Tracy finds a way to get Jed to go to the bank. She then goes to the mansion and flatters Granny, Elly and Jethro. Tracy takes them to her penthouse for something to eat. Drysdale returns and learns from Jed and Miss Jane about Tracy wanting to buy Jed's house. He gets excited about the prospect of having Tracy put her money into his bank. Tracy manages to get Granny, Elly and Jethro on her side, but Jed still won't sell. Drysdale goes to see Tracy and tells her he will help her get the mansion if she deposits her money in his bank. Tracy was expecting Jed in hopes of seducing him. The Clampetts each show up and say that Jed shouldn't sell the mansion.
123	17	"The Trotting Horse"	Joseph Depew	Paul Henning & Mark Tuttle	January 12, 1966	4–17
Granny wants to learn to drive the truck so she can get around by herself. The driving lessons don't go well. Granny decides she wants a horse and buggy. Miss Jane tells Drysdale that the Clampetts want a horse. Drysdale is against the idea until Miss Jane tells him some advantages of owning the horse. Drysdale buys a professional trotting race horse as an investment. A Driver (Norman Leavitt) and the horse handler (Herb Vigran) come by the mansion with the horse. Granny and Elly love the horse and Granny takes it for a ride. Granny is disappointed because she can't get the horse to go any faster than a trot. Drysdale tells Jed that he expects the horse to win a lot of races and money. Granny and Jed don't realize that the horse is a trotter. Elly teaches the horse to run fast. Granny drives the horse in a race and wins. But she is disqualified because the horse wasn't trotting.
124	18	"The Buggy"	Joseph Depew	Paul Henning & Mark Tuttle	January 19, 1966	4–18
Jed gets Granny a nice buggy for their champion harness racer, Ladybelle. Margaret tells Drysdale that he better get rid of the horse. Granny suggests they buy a horse and buggy for Mrs. Drysdale so that they can have buggy races. Miss Jane tells Drysdale that they can return Ladybelle because the stable says that Granny bought another horse. Granny gets Margaret an old broken-down mare and names it Lightnin'. Jed tells Granny to return it and get a nice horse. Jed tells Drysdale how much a race against Margaret would mean to Granny. Margaret agrees to race when Drysdale promises her that the Clampetts will leave Beverly Hills if she wins. Drysdale isn't concerned because he's seen Lightnin'. Jed learns that Granny didn't get a better horse for Margaret. Jed tries to teach Granny a lesson by switching Lightnin' with Granny's Ladybelle. He then paints Lightnin' to look like Ladybelle, but Granny finds out. Granny uses her tonic to put some life back into Lightnin' and she wins the race.
125	19	"The Cat Burglar"	Joseph Depew	Paul Henning & Mark Tuttle	January 26, 1966	4–19
Granny keeps seeing Elly's kittens and cats in places around the mansion. But everytime she tries to show them to Jed, they run away before he gets there. Jed thinks Granny is seeing things. The family hears there's a cat burglar in Beverly Hills. Not surprisingly, they don't really understand what a cat burglar is. Elly is determined to keep her kitties safe. Mike Wilcox (John Ashley), the cat burglar, shows up at the Clampetts' residence posing as a detective. Jethro tells Mike that Elly set traps for the thief inside and outside the mansion. While Jethro shows Mike around, Jethro gets caught in one of Elly's traps. Elly shows Mike around and he finds out what they think a cat burglar is. Jethro keeps getting caught in Elly's traps. Drysdale comes by and says he wants to stay with the family. That night, Mike and his partner Bernie (Norm Grabowski) try to rob the mansion. Elly catches Bernie and turns him over to Mike. When Mike and Bernie try to escape, they are caught in one of Elly's outside traps.
126	20	"The Big Chicken"	Joseph Depew	Paul Henning & Mark Tuttle	February 2, 1966	4–20
Granny is upset because Elly's chickens are in her tomato patch. Granny wants to grow a prize winning tomato for the county fair. Meanwhile, Drysdale makes himself look younger because he's taking pictures for a new add campaign for the bank. At the bank, Ad Man Nelson (John Baer) tells Miss Jane that the campaign picture will include an ostrich. When Drysdale finds out he'll be posing with an ostrich, he fires Nelson. However, Drysdale now owns the ostrich and brings it home for the time being. Granny decides to create a growing tonic for her tomatoes. Some of Granny's tomatoes are missing and she thinks Elly's chickens ate them. Granny sees the ostrich and thinks her growing tonic for tomatoes has made a giant chicken. Until she can create a shrinking pill, she tries to keep the giant chicken a secret. Miss Jane tells Drysdale that she might have some buyers for the ostrich, but it is no longer in his garage. Drysdale comes by and asks Granny if she's seen his ostrich. When her shrinking pill doesn't work, Granny decides that she'll enter her giant chicken at the county fair.
127	21	"Sonny Drysdale Returns"	Joseph Depew	Paul Henning & Mark Tuttle	February 9, 1966	4–21
Granny tells Jed that she has seen signs that Elly will soon be married. Jed doesn't hold much stock in Granny's signs. Jethro tells Jed and Granny that Sonny Drysdale (Louis Nye) is coming home from school. Granny thinks that's who Elly is going to marry. Drysdale tells Miss Jane that Sonny's been going to school for 19 years and is still a sophomore. Drysdale wants Sonny to get a job and get married, preferably to Elly. Drysdale arranges a job for Sonny as a door to door beauty product salesman. Sonny has been to 5 houses and not sold a thing. His sixth stop is at the Clampetts and Elly mistakes his merchandise for courting gifts. Sonny thinks Elly is going to buy all the products. Drysdale is thrilled when he thinks Sonny has made a huge sale. After speaking with Jed, Drysdale figures out that Elly thought all the products were gifts. Drysdale forces Sonny to propose to Elly, but Elly says no. Note: We learn that Sonny's real first name is Adonis.
128	22	"Brewster's Baby"	Joseph Depew	Paul Henning & Mark Tuttle	February 16, 1966	4–22
Jed tells Miss Jane that Granny and Elly are heading back to the hills to deliver a baby. They're waiting for Jethro to drive them to the train. Jethro brings home some girls from the Kit Kat Club so he won't be lonely. Jed then decides all four of them will go back to the hills. Drysdale is frantic to stop them so he tries to come up with an employee who is going to have a baby. He then remembers that the Brewsters (Frank Wilcox and Lisa Seagram) are having a baby that Granny can deliver, knowing they plan to adopt. Drysdale is able to stop the Clampetts from leaving. He tells the Brewsters that Granny will be their baby nurse. Meanwhile, Jethro wants to turn the mansion into his own key club, The Possum Pen. John Brewster tries to tell Jed that his wife Edythe won't need Granny's help. Jed misunderstands and thinks Edythe will deliver the baby by herself. The Brewsters try to explain to Granny about the adoption, but Granny believes that the Brewsters think they are going to a baby store to buy a baby. Later, the Brewsters come by with their baby, John Jr. Phyllis Davis, Joyce Nizzari and Christine Williams guest-star as the kitty kat girls.
129	23	"The Great Jethro"	Joseph Depew	Paul Henning & Mark Tuttle	March 2, 1966	4–23
Granny thinks Jethro is getting lazy and needs to find a job. Jed thinks Jethro should try to get a job at the bank because he has a head for figures. Marvin Bagby (John Carradine), a magician who goes by Marvo the Magnificent, comes to Drysdale's office. Jethro is thrilled to meet a magician. Marvin wants to take out a loan. He hasn't worked in 10 years because his magic equipment has been locked up due to unpaid back rent. Drysdale sends him on his way. Jethro invites Marvin to the mansion. Marvin agrees to go when he learns how much money Jed has. Marvin puts on a show for the family. Jethro decides he wants to be a magician. Marvin sees a chance to sell his stored magic equipment to the gullible Jethro. Jed tells Drysdale that he bought Marvin's stuff. Jethro tries to put on a magic show for Jed, Granny, Drysdale and Miss Jane. Things don't go so well.
130	24	"The Old Folks Home"	Joseph Depew	Paul Henning & Mark Tuttle	March 9, 1966	4–24
Granny has decided it is time for spring cleaning even though it isn't spring. Jed is worried that Granny is going to over work herself and the rest of the family. Jed tells Drysdale that he thinks maybe a smaller place in the country would be better. Jed wants the family to subtly tell Granny she's too old for this heavy work. But Granny misunderstands and believes Jed wants to put her in an old folks home. Meanwhile, Miss Jane thinks that hiring Mrs. Mack as a housekeeper would be a good idea. Mrs. Mack tells Granny that she'll be doing the cleaning from now on. But Miss Jane calls Drysdale and tells him that Mrs. Mack saw the size of the mansion and quit. Granny wants to head to the hills with her share of the money, which Drysdale is desperate to avoid. Drysdale tells Granny he needs her help at the bank. She thinks he just made her his new secretary. Drysdale actually makes Granny the Vice President of the whole building. She decides it is time for spring bank cleaning.
131	25	"Flatt and Scruggs Return"	Joseph Depew	Paul Henning & Mark Tuttle	March 23, 1966	4–25
The Clampetts are expecting a visit from Lester Flatt and Earl Scruggs. They're not sure if the wives are coming. Jethro adapts the truck with helicopter blades to avoid traffic, which as usual, doesn't quite work. Jed now has Miss Jane pick up Lester and Earl at the airport. Lester's wife Gladys (Joi Lansing) came along. While riding in his limousine, Drysdale see Miss Jane. He thinks she left the bank to go on a double date and decides to fire her. Gladys would like to be a singer. Gladys is not thrilled that Granny insists on giving her cooking lessons. At the bank, Drysdale gives Miss Jane an undeserved scolding. Miss Jane ends up quitting her job after she explains who she was driving with. Gladys sing a song for the Clampetts. While it is actually very good, it is not the type of song that the others are used to. Jethro now adapts the truck with helicopter blades and rockets, so it will move forward. Gladys' cooking lessons don't go so well. Miss Jane wants to sing with Lester and Earl.
132	26	"The Folk Singers"	Joseph Depew	Paul Henning & Mark Tuttle	March 30, 1966	4–26
Jethro is bent on becoming an astronaut and getting all the glory. He attaches some rockets to his back and has wings on his arms. Jed stops the rockets from igniting. Jed wants to get Miss Jane's opinion. Drysdale tells Jed that Miss Jane no longer works for him. Drysdale fails at an attempt to get Miss Jane to return to work. Jed sends Elly to be Drysdale's secretary. Elly brings along a bunch of her critters. Things don't go well when Jethro tries his rockets again. Miss Jane tells Jethro he could get more glory being a folk singer. Along the way Jethro invents a new musical device he dubs the Bodine O'Phone. After seeing Jethro with his new instrument, musical agent Kingsley Sherman (Tom D'Andrea) suggests that newly-unemployed Miss Jane team up with Jethro. With a couple wigs and goofy clothes, Kingsley thinks they can be a hit. Also guest starring Thomas Browne Henry as potential depositor Harvey Matthews.
133	27	"The Beautiful Maid"	Joseph Depew	Paul Henning & Mark Tuttle	April 6, 1966	4–27
Granny complains to Jed that Jethro has been neglecting his chores. Jethro trades in the truck for a fancy sports car because he wants to attract the ladies. Meanwhile, Drysdale is irate that beautiful actress Ulla Bergstrom (Julie Newmar) is kept on an expensive stipend without making a film. He decides to send her back to Sweden. But he becomes smitten with Ulla after meeting her when studio chief Lawrence Chapman (Milton Frome) brings her to the bank. There's a role she would like to play that requires her to speak as a backwoods character. Miss Jane suggests that they let Ulla stay with the Clampetts so that she can pick up their accents and mannerisms. Ulla arrives at the mansion. Jethro tells Jed he's decided to ran away from home, but then he sees Ulla in a bathing suit. Jed and Granny misunderstand what Ulla did before she came to Hollywood. Not knowing that she is already under contract at the movie studio, Jed asks Chapman to come by to see Ulla. Jed tells Chapman he would consider it a big favor if he put Ulla in a movie. Jed would also make sure Chapman got a big raise.
134	28	"The Bird Watchers"	Joseph Depew	Paul Henning & Mark Tuttle	April 13, 1966	4–28
Elly has been baking and it isn't going well. Professor P. Caspar Biddle (Wally Cox) of the Biddle Birdwatchers Society is in town and Miss Jane wanted the day off. Drysdale and Miss Jane pick up Biddle and bring him to the Clampetts. Drysdale needs some tax papers signed and Biddle would like to ask Jed for some money to save the Condors. Biddle is impressed with how well Elly gets along with birds. Granny remains eager to get Elly to the altar and wants Drysdale to find her a man. Elly tells Jed and Granny that she's going birdwatching with Biddle. Drysdale blackmails Dash Riprock (Larry Pennell) into going out with Elly. Jed wants Elly to wait for Dash, but she leaves to go birdwatching. Jed thinks the Condors are a mountain family and wants to give them some money. Drysdale tells Jed to wait. Jed has a confusing conversation about the Condors with Biddle. Miss Jane explains to Jed that the Condors are birds. Elly won't break a date with Biddle to go out with Dash.
135	29	"Jethro Gets Engaged"	Joseph Depew	Paul Henning & Mark Tuttle	April 20, 1966	4–29
Dash is still dating Elly. Jethro decides to get a job as an actor. Not knowing what's involved, Jethro is going to be Dash's stunt double and he'll call himself Beef Jerky. Jed and Granny worry that Jethro might take Dash's job away from him. Debbie Haber comes to the bank and is upset with Drysdale because he set Dash up with Elly. Dash had promised Debbie a screen test. Drysdale tells her that Jethro's uncle owns the studio. At the studio, Debbie plays up to Jethro so she can get to Jed and he thinks he has a sweetheart. Phil Gordon (Pat Harrington Jr.), the Director, sets up Jethro's first stunt. Jethro is having a rough time with all the dangerous stunts. Jethro comes home all worn and tatered and doesn't want to be a movie star anymore. Debbie comes by the mansion and has a confusing conversation with Jed. Dash arrives and sends Debbie to the studio. Also guest-starring Dick Winslow as a man, Jack Bannon as Bob the Cameraman, Phil Gordon as a Second Assistant, and Ray Kellogg as Gate Guard.
136	30	"Granny Tonics a Birdwatcher"	Joseph Depew	Paul Henning & Mark Tuttle	April 27, 1966	4–30
Granny brews a batch of her spring tonic, but only has the ingredients for a small batch. Granny wants to give a bottle to Dash Riprock hoping he'll propose to Elly. Jed is against the idea. Meanwhile, Professor Biddle asks Miss Jane's help in hatching a condor egg, which she misinterprets as a marriage proposal. She is disappointed when she finds out about the egg. Granny goes to the bank with a bottle of tonic. She wants Miss Jane to give it to Dash. Miss Jane puts some of the tonic in Biddle's water canteen hoping he will fall for her. Elly comes by the bank to get Granny. Biddle sees Elly and wants to be with her. Biddle winds up in a tree at the Clampett mansion. Miss Jane has some tonic and goes up the tree to get Biddle. Drysdale comes by because he's hiding from his wife after she drinks some tonic. Drysdale drinks some tonic and runs back to his wife. Miss Jane tells Jed and Granny that Biddle proposed, but she turned him down. Miss Jane and Biddle are happy because the condor egg hatched.
137	31	"Jethro's Pad"	Joseph Depew	Robert Schaefer & Eric Freiwald	May 4, 1966	4–31
Jed tells Granny that Jethro got a job cleaning out Drysdale's garage. Jethro shows Jed a bunch of old "Swinger" magazines that Drysdale had. He wants to study them so he can learn how to be an International Playboy. Jethro starts by turning the palor into a bachelor pad. When that doesn't work out, he gets a very small trailor to put on the truck. Jethro goes to the Kitty Kat Klub where he shows his trailor to one of the girls. She is not impressed. Jethro complains to Drysdale that his Swinger magazines didn't work. Drysdale wants to keep Jethro happy, so he hires another Kitty Kat Showgirl (Phyllis Davis) to flirt with him. Miss Jane also dresses up as a Kitty Kat. Things go wrong when he tries to turn on the stereo in the trailer. Bank employee Edy (Edy Williams) flirts with Jethro after learning Jed has 50 million dollars. They are in the trailor down by the beach. When the trailor winds up floating out into the ocean, Edy has had enough and jumps out.
138	32	"Jethro Goes to College"	Joseph Depew	Mark Tuttle & Ronny Pearlman	May 18, 1966	4–32
Jethro is trying to mix up a batch of love potion, but it doesn't go well. Jed thinks Jethro needs to go back to school to get his mind off girls. Jed and Jethro ask Drysdale to recommend a college. Drysdale, believing Jethro could never get a college degree, promises him a job at the bank if he got one. Miss Pringle (Hope Summers) informs Mrs. Frisby (Louise Lorimer), the Dean of Frisby Business Secretarial college, that the school is going broke. Jethro comes by with a lot of money that Jed gave him and Dean Frisby enroles him. Not knowing what it is, Elly wants to attend a College of Judo and Karate. Jethro goes to his first class and is thrilled to see all the other students are women. Dean Frisby can only take so much of Jethro and she gives him a diploma. Jed tells Drysdale that Jethro graduated and sends him to the bank for his job. Elly is disappointed with her first day at college. She tells Granny that all they did was throw each other around and she got a black belt. Hoshu Fujiyama, from the Judo college, comes to the mansion and Granny throws him around. At his new bank job, Jethro hires all his classmates. Also guest-starring Gloria Neil as Miss Plumpett.

=== Season 5 (1966–67) ===
No. overall	No. in season	Title	Directed by	Written by	Original release date	Prod. code
139	1	"The Party Line"	Joseph Depew	Paul Henning & Mark Tuttle	September 14, 1966	5–1
Drysdale comes back from vacation and Miss Jane tells him that Granny and Jethro went back to the hills for a visit. Drysdale is worried about Jed having to eat Elly's cooking and goes to see him. Granny and Jethro return and bring gifts for everyone that Pearl made. Granny also brings an old-fashioned telephone. Jethro's attempt at setting up a party line with the phone results in the neighborhood losing power. Jed and Granny ask Drysdale for help setting up the phone. Mr. Cramer (Vinton Hayworth), a representative of the phone company, tells Drysdale that the company will not be able to set up a party line. When Drysdale demands that the Clampetts get a party line, Cramer turns off the phone service to the bank.
140	2	"The Soup Contest"	Joseph Depew	Paul Henning & Buddy Atkinson	September 21, 1966	5–2
In an attempt to attract suitors for Elly, Granny enters some of her own soup in a contest under Elly's name. Elly wins the contest and Granny tries to convince Jed to let her go on TV. Jed thinks it would be dishonest to let her win using Granny's soup. Jed wants Granny to call the soup company. She pretends to call the company, but she actually calls Drysdale at the bank. Stafford Clark (Gavin Gordon), the head of the soup company and Roger Dickerback (Stephen Dunne), a representative of the advertising agency come by the mansion. When Granny says that Elly is very young, the men then want to get Jed's signature allowing her to go on TV. Drysdale and Miss Jane come by and Granny wants him to pretend to be Jed and sign the papers. To appease Granny, Drysdale gets Miss Jane to dress up as Jed to sign the papers. After the men leave, Jed comes home and sees Miss Jane. Things get explained to Jed and Granny winds up doing the TV spot. But Granny manages to get Elly, who is wearing a bathing suit, on camera. Also guest-starring Steve Pendleton as TV Director. Note: Max Baer Jr. does not appear on this episode.
141	3	"Jethro Takes Love Lessons"	Joseph Depew	Mark Tuttle & Ronny Pearlman	September 28, 1966	5–3
Jethro is in love with Susie, the carhop waitress at the local drive-in, but she wants nothing to do with him. Jed tells Jethro to ask Dash Riprock (Larry Pennell) for dating advice. Dash tries to give Jethro some tips, but things don't go to well. Dash tells Jethro to buy a convertible and invite Susie to go on a double date with Elly May and him. The car he buys isn't in the best of shape. When Susie learns Jethro knows Dash, she agrees to go on the date. The four go to a drive in movie for the date. At first all Jethro does is eat. Dash gives Jethro some more advice. Do to Jethro's bungling and the car not working well, the date is a disaster. The next day Dash lets Jethro use his bachelor pad. Susie only agrees to another date because she wants to see Dash's apartment. After a short time, Susie leaves. Miss Jane comes by because she wants to protect Jethro from the influence of Dash. It turns out that all Jethro can now think of is eating.
142	4	"The Badger Game"	Joseph Depew	Paul Henning & Buddy Atkinson	October 5, 1966	5–4
A young woman named Rita (Gayle Hunnicutt) poses as Emaline Fetty, an acquaintance from back home. The Clampetts insist she stay with them for awhile. She is actually a con-artist and hopes to blackmail Jed with some compromising photographs. Rita calls her partner, Colonel Foxhall (Leon Ames), and tells him she got the pictures and recordings. Foxhall brings the pictures to Drysdale and demands one million dollars. Meanwhile, Jethro thinks Emaline is in love with him and he asks Jed if they can get married. Drysdale, Miss Jane and Foxhall go over to the Clampetts with the pictures. At first Jed doesn't understand. Jethro sees the pictures and thinks Jed was stealing his girl. Jed says he'll do the right thing and marry Emaline. She, naturally, wants nothing to do with that option and leaves.
143	5	"The Badgers Return"	Joseph Depew	Paul Henning & Buddy Atkinson	October 12, 1966	5–5
Lieutenant Richards (David Frankham) brings Colonel Foxhall to the Clampetts to be identified. Richards tells Drysdale that Rita Rio, posing as Emaline, is still on the loose. Meanwhile, Emaline talks Jethro into making her sophisticated to help her evade the police. Due to the Colonel's fast talking, the Clampetts come to believe that the Lieutenant is the criminal. Drysdale arrives to explain to Jed who Richards is. Foxhall attempts to woo Granny, and now she won't let Richards arrest him. Emaline gets all dressed up and asks Jethro to take her to the bank. She has bigger plans for blackmailing Drysdale with her cuckoo clock camera. Emaline tells Drysdale that she is from the District Attorney's Office. She manages to get some compromising pictures with Drysdale. Because of how he transformed Emaline, Jethro tells Jed he wants to open a charm school. Foxhall shows Drysdale the pictures and demands money. Otherwise, Rita will show copies to Mrs. Drysdale. However, the two swindlers haven't met someone as sharp as Jed.
144	6	"The Gorilla"	Joseph Depew	Paul Henning & Buddy Atkinson	October 19, 1966	5–6
Jethro is chopping wood while Maybelle, Elly's chimpanzee, watches. He wishes that he could teach the chimp to chop wood. When Elly comes by, she and Jethro talk and decide that they want a gorilla. Jed calls Drysdale and requests a gorilla to help out with the housework. Drysdale hires Tom Kelly (George Barrows), a man in a costume, to hopefully frighten the Clampetts into changing their minds. The Clampetts name the gorilla Herbie. Herbie knocks a cup out of Granny's hand and she hits him. The two go at it and Herbie is afraid of her. They put clothes on Herbie and proceed to work him to death. Drysdale and Miss Jane come by. Tom quits and leaves Drysdale with the gorilla suit. Drysdale puts the suit on and drives off with Miss Jane. The Clampetts go to the zoo and get another gorilla and bring it home.
145	7	"Come Back, Little Herby"	Joseph Depew	Paul Henning & Buddy Atkinson	October 26, 1966	5–7
The Clampetts still have the gorilla from the zoo and Granny and the ape having been going at it. They get the zoo to take it back. The Clampetts miss Herbie and ask Drysdale to get the tame gorilla back. Tom Kelly tells Drysdale he's not going to do it. Jed and Elly come by and Drysdale says that Tom is Herbie's owner. Drysdale comes up with enough money and Tom agrees to be Herbie for a little while. Herbie takes advantage of the Clampetts' lifestyle when he's supposed to be working. This includes eating fancy food that Drysdale had to buy and dancing with Elly by the pool. Jed asks Drysdale to bring Tom Kelly over because Jed would like to buy Herbie from him. Tom comes up with a plan. Drysdale will wear the gorilla suit while Tom tells Jed that Herbie is not for sale. When Jed offers $10,000, Tom accepts and drives off, leaving Drysdale in the gorilla suit.
146	8	"Jed in Politics"	Joseph Depew	Mark Tuttle & Ronny Pearlman	November 2, 1966	5–8
Granny's soap making sends noxious smoke into the air. Thanks to Mrs. Drysdale, this gets the attention of smog commissioner Russell Tinsley (Paul Reed). Tinsley sends a letter to Granny telling her to stop. Thinking there might be a feud, Jethro turns the truck into a tank. When Tinsley comes by the house to check on things, Granny chases him away. Tinsley tells Drysdale that if Granny doesn't stop soap making, he'll throw the Clampetts in jail. Jed decides to run against Tinsley in an upcoming election when he misunderstands Miss Jane's advice. The Clampetts start campaigning in front of the bank. The Drysdales suggests they hold a rally at their mansion. Tinsley gets upset when Granny tries to trap him in Jethro's tank. Jethro's attempt at letting people know about the rally by sky writing fails. Drysdale sets up a debate on TV between Jed and Tinsley. Jethro claims to have invented a small device to remove smog from cars. Believing the device works, Tinsley agrees to leave Granny alone and Jed drops out of the race. Then Tinsley sees the giant filter that goes along with the device. Also guest-starring Tom Hatten as Tinsley's Assistant.
147	9	"Clampett Cha Cha Cha"	Joseph Depew	Mark Tuttle & Ronny Pearlman	November 9, 1966	5–9
Granny wins free in-home dance lessons from the out-of-work vaudeville team Marvin (Frank Faylen) and Marita (Iris Adrian). They hope to eventually sell the Clampetts additional lessons. Miss Jane tells Drysdale what Granny won and he wants her to check the dance couple out. Marvin and Marita arrive at the mansion. Jed tells them that Elly and Jethro would like to take lessons at their dance studio. There is no actual studio, so Marvin lies and says they lost their lease. Jed says they should bring their other students to the Clampett mansion. Marvin can't bring himself to say there are no other students. Later, when no students show up, Jed tells Granny the students deserted the couple because they lost their fancy dance hall. Marvin tries to tell Jed the truth, but Jed and Granny misunderstand and feel bad for Marvin. Drysdale comes by to get rid of the dancers, but Marvin manages to convince Drysdale that he's a great dancer. Jed sends Jethro and Elly out to sign up some new students. Drysdale and Miss Jane show Jed and Granny the dance routine they will do for the Bankers Convention Variety Show. Drysdale and Jed wind up dancing with Marvin and Marita at the variety show.
148	10	"Jed Joins the Board"	Guy Scarpitta	Mark Tuttle & Ronny Pearlman	November 16, 1966	5–10
Jed wants to make himself useful by becoming a garbage collector. Drysdale, fearing potential embarrassment, asks John Brewster (Frank Wilcox) to put Jed to work on the board of directors of O.K. Oil Company. Brewster thinks Jed should be on the bank's board. Drysdale pulls a fast one and Jed will be on Brewster's board. Board Member E. W. Brachner (Barry Kelley) is against the idea until he hears how much money Jed has. Jed wants to help Brewster get more oil and remembers the oil they found when Jethro was digging up a root cellar. Brewster discovers that oil losses in a Beverly Hills section of a pipeline are due to the Clampetts accidentally tapping the line. Miss Jane suggests they put the Clampetts on the company's airplane while Brewster gets the pipeline repaired. When they get home, they discover their "oil well" has dried up. Jed would to think of another way to get Brewster more money. Jed decides to use the company's airplane to start an airline service, complete with wooden benches and ropes for seat belts. Jethro will take over the Co-pilot's (Jack Grinnage) job. Granny is the stewardess and serves up some of her moonshine. Also guest-starring Tommy Farrell as the Pilot and C. Lindsay Workman as Mr. Peterson.
149	11	"Granny Lives It Up"	Joseph Depew	Paul Henning & Mark Tuttle	November 23, 1966	5–11
John Cushing (Roy Roberts) makes another attempt to get the Clampetts to move their money to his bank by romancing Granny. Margaret tells Drysdale that her father Lowell Farquhar (Charlie Ruggles) is coming for a visit, but is stranded in Las Vegas with no money. Miss Jane suggests that Drysdale use Lowell, who had once dated Granny, to draw her away from Cushing. Lowell arrives at the bank and has brought two casino employees, Lil (Jo Ann Pflug) and Jill, as his financial advisors. Granny comes to the bank with Jed and Cushing to take her share of Jed's money out. She runs into Lowell there. Later, John comes by the mansion with a gift for Granny. Lowell was to have a date with her later that day, but Drysdale brings him over earlier. Granny runs herself ragged entertaining both men separately in the house at the same time. Granny tells Jed she's not sure if the men are after her or her money. Lil and Jill are by the pool and Jed goes to ask them for some financial advise. Both men decide they've had enough and go to the casino together with Lil and Jill.
150	12	"The Gloria Swanson Story"	Joseph Depew	Paul Henning & Mark Tuttle	November 30, 1966	5–12
Jethro has a job as a paperboy. He causes some problems when he attaches the papers to roofing slates so he can throw them further. Jed shows Granny a newspaper article that says Gloria Swanson is selling her estate and many of her possessions. She will be moving east. The property will be made into a golf course. They think that she's broke and that she's being forced to do this. What the Clampetts don't know is that Gloria wants to move and Drysdale is in on this venture. Plus the proceeds of the items that are sold at auction will be donated to charity. They go to see her and hope to lift up her spirits. They try to stop Mr. Foley (George N. Neise), who is in charge of the auction, from taking things out of the house. After they meet Gloria, they tell her that her movies are still being shown in their hometown. Jed decides to ask Lawrence Chapman (Milton Frome), who runs his movie studio, to make a silent movie with Swanson and the Clampetts in it. The film is called "Passion's Plaything" and premieres at the Bijou Theater in Bugtussle. Also guest-starring Frank Sully as a Mover, Dan White as a Man at the movie premier, and Ray Kellogg as Gate Guard.
151	13	"The Woodchucks"	Joseph Depew	Mark Tuttle & Ronny Pearlman	December 7, 1966	5–13
Jethro is so desperate to meet a woman that he wants to mail himself to Paris. Miss Jane comes by the mansion with her bird watching group. Miss Jane introduces Athena Armstrong (Nancy Dow) to Jed and Granny. The women go back by the pool, where Jethro happens to be. Jethro sees the attractive Athena and tries to get her attention, but it doesn't work. Jethro wants to join the Biddle Birdwatchers even though they don't allow men. Mr. Drysdale suggests to Jed that Jethro to join the Woodchucks. Jethro isn't interested until he sees the women all gathered around head Woodchuck Stanley Kragleman. Stanley explains to Jethro about his achievement awards. Drysdale tells Jethro that he's invited the birdwatchers to his initiation later that day. The initiation is interrupted by one of Jethro's achievement award attempts and it involved him making an ant farm. Jethro is finally made a Woodchuck. Also guest-starring Lynn Kellogg as Bird Watcher #6.
152	14	"Foggy Mountain Soap"	Joseph Depew	Paul Henning & Buddy Atkinson	December 14, 1966	5–14
Granny and Jed are expecting Lester Flatt and Earl Scruggs for a visit. Elly is wearing a mini skirt and Jethro says he wants to direct the movie Flatt and Scruggs will be in. Flatt and Scruggs arrive and Jethro learns they'll be filming a TV commercial for Foggy Mountain Soap. Commodore Stewart Ratterman (Edward Andrews), the head of the advertising agency, comes by. After meeting Granny and Jed, Ratterman thinks the two would lend authenticity to the commercial and would help sell the soap. At the studio, Ratterman learns that Jethro will be the director and Elly is Jethro's "yes girl". Ratterman starts to figure out how incompetent Jethro really is. Jed and Granny arrive on set. Ratterman and assistant director Harry Hogan (Bobs Watson) show Jed and Granny what they would like them to do in the commercial. When they start filming, Ratterman didn't count on their honesty and things do not go well.
153	15	"The Christmas Present"	Guy Scarpitta	Mark Tuttle & Ronny Pearlman	December 21, 1966	5–15
Christmas is almost here but Granny can't get into the holiday spirit. Jed suggests that "giving" to someone might cheer her up. Jed thinks Mrs. Drysdale should be the person. Meanwhile, Margaret asks Milburn to send the Clampetts away for Christmas. Margaret is selling her old clothes for charity. Granny wants to use her mind-reading potion to figure out what to get Margaret. Margaret tries to talk the Clampetts into flying back to the hills for Christmas. The Clampetts think that the Drysdales are broke because Jethro tells them Margaret is selling all of her good clothes. They want to buy them back for her as a Christmas present. They can't get money out of the bank because Mr. Drysdale would find out. So to keep it a secret, the Clampetts take seasonal jobs in a department store. Jethro is the store Santa and Elly is an elf. Jed is in sporting goods. Granny is in the Lingerie Department. Margaret comes by the department and thinking she can't afford the items, Granny just puts them in her purse. A woman thanks the Store Manager (James Millhollin) for hiring the Santa because he does so well with the kids. It is as if he had the mind of a child. Mrs. Drysdale gets arrested for shoplifting. The Drysdales and Miss Jane go to the Clampetts for Christmas. Also guest-starring Bruce Hyde as the Floorwalker.
154	16	"The Flying Saucer"	Joseph Depew	Paul Henning & Mark Tuttle	December 28, 1966	5–16
Granny wants to know what Mrs. Drysdale is hiding behind a giant tarp in her backyard. Drysdale tells Miss Jane he's come up with a great promotion for the bank. He'll have a flying saucer to swoop down over the Rose Bowl advertising the bank. He hired three Italian little people (Frank Delfino, Jerry Maren and Billy Curtis), "The Flying Montenaros", to play the little green Martians. Jethro discovers that behind the tarp there's a flying saucer. Granny goes to Drysdale's home and sees the green men pearing out the window. Jethro thinks the Martians have come for him because he's so smart. Meanwhile, Drysdale has a photographer (John Alvin) take a picture of him as George Washington. He'll use the picture to make "Drysdale Dollars", that the Martians will throw out of the flying saucer. The Clampetts invite the Martians over for something to eat. But, as the actors only speak Italian, Granny gets annoyed with them. Granny shoots the flying saucer and it deflates as it was only a balloon. When Drysdale's plan falls through, he tries to pay off the actors with the Drysdale dollars.
155	17	"The Mayor of Bug Tussle"	Joseph Depew	Paul Henning & Mark Tuttle	January 4, 1967	5–17
The Clampetts are excited over the pending visit from Amos Wentworth Hogg (James Westerfield) who is the Mayor of Bug Tussle. Drysdale and Miss Jane come by to welcome the Mayor as well. Hogg arrives and Drysdale is not impressed. Later, Hogg and the Clampetts come to the bank. Drysdale, trying to impress Jed, makes a lot of promises to Hogg. Drysdale confesses to Hogg that he can't keep those promises and doesn't want Jed to know. Hogg tells Drysdale that he came to town in hopes of raising $100,000 to cover an embezzlement debt. Drysdale won't give him the money. Hogg tries asking Jed for the money but can't find the words. Jed, however, believes Hogg has eyes for Granny. When Hogg learns how much money Granny has, he is about to propose. But, before he can, Drysdale shows up with a check in order to get rid of Hogg.
156	18	"Granny Retires"	Joseph Depew	Mark Tuttle & Ronny Pearlman	January 11, 1967	5–18
Granny tells the family that she's retiring from doctoring. She may be going back to the hills so she'll have to train Jethro and Elly to take over for her. Jed tells Drysdale and Miss Jane that Granny will be leaving and taking her share of the money. Granny claims she wants to find a cure for freckles. Miss Jane tells Drysdale that she thinks Granny feels useless and unneeded. Drysdale gets Dr. Roy Clyburn (Fred Clark) to ask Granny's medical advice, promising him money for his medical charity. Granny confides to Jed that she's really leaving because she wants to find the cure for "Granny's Complaint". She describes the symptoms and Jed says it is just old age. Clyburn comes by the mansion asking Granny to help him. She puts him in her class with Jethro and Elly. Granny asks Roy to take over her practice. Drysdale comes by, pretending to be sick, so Granny will have someone to cure. This backfires when Elly and Jethro start to work on him. Granny decides to stay with the family. She thinks she's developed a cure for Granny's Complaint, but Jed realizes it is just moonshine.
157	19	"The Clampett Curse"	Joseph Depew	Mark Tuttle & Ronny Pearlman	January 25, 1967	5–19
Jethro shows Granny and Jed the phone he put in the truck. The problem is when he drives off the line is still connected to the house. Granny believes that things were much simpler when they were poor. Meanwhile, Ginny Jennings (Sheila James) comes to the bank. She tells Drysdale that she's trying to raise money for needy UCLA college students. Drysdale kicks her out. Ginny tells Lucy (Bernadette Withers) and Fran that they should try Jed Clampett. Feeling burdened by their wealth, Jed and Granny decide to donate all of their millions to Ginny. They don't know it is a phony foundation and that the girls just need some money. The girls are stunned when they see the check is for 68 million dollars. The girls go to the bank, but Ginny feels a little guilty cashing the check and they leave. Miss Jane suggests to Drysdale that he try to get Ginny's account. Heading back home to the hills, the Clampetts run out of gas before they get out of Los Angeles. To get Ginny's account, Drysdale says she can have the Clampett mansion. The Clampetts want to clear part of a park and take up sharecropping. Jethro tells Jed he's going back to the city. Park Ranger Warkle runs the family off the land. Ginny gives Jed the check back.
158	20	"The Indians Are Coming"	Joseph Depew	Paul Henning & Buddy Atkinson	February 1, 1967	5–20
Granny misinterprets a phone call from Cousin Pearl and believes Indians have attacked Bug Tussle and have taken over Clampett oil land. Miss Jane tells Drysdale that Mr. Brewster called. It seems there's a boundary dispute and the Indians are claiming part of Jed's land. Miss Jane says that Chief Running Wolf and Little Fox (John Considine) will travel to Beverly Hills to settle the dispute with Jed. Granny prepares for war and expects to be scalped by the "red devils". Miss Jane picks the men up and they look like everyday businessmen. They arrive at the bank and Drysdale is dressed as an Indian and acts very stereotypical. Running Wolf and Little Fox go to meet with Jed at their hotel. Still dressed as an Indian, Drysdale goes to the Clampett mansion and Granny shoots at him. Drysdale calls Chapman at the movie studio and tells him to send some actors dressed as Indians to the mansion. He hopes Granny will believe she fought them off and not go back to the hills to fight them. Meanwhile, Jed and Running Wolf come to an understanding. The actors arrive and Drysdale finds a way to have Granny drive them off. John Wayne guest-stars as himself in an uncredited cameo.
159	21	"The Marriage Machine"	Joseph Depew	Mark Tuttle & Ronny Pearlman	February 8, 1967	5–21
Granny is brewing up a love potion for Jed and he wants her to stop. Jethro tells Granny about Roto Romance, a computer dating service. After Granny's love potion is a failure, she goes to the dating service to find someone for Jed. Linda Oliver, from the dating service, takes a fancy to Jethro when she finds out how much money Jed has. Later, Granny talks to Mr. Filbert and answers questions about Jed. Mr. Filbert tells Linda to keep Granny company while he runs Jed's card. Granny thinks Linda was the woman picked for Jed and leaves. Mr. Filbert tells Linda that Jed's perfect match is a Mrs. Gladys Peabody (Lurene Tuttle). At the mansion, a mix-up occurs and Gladys thinks she is supposed to be with Jethro. Jethro is a little disappointed and tells Jed. Jed talks to Gladys and they find they have a lot in common. Linda comes by to see Jethro. But, because Jethro thinks he's intended for Gladys, he tries to get Linda interested in Jed. Jed tells Jethro he's interested in Gladys. Jethro can now pursue Linda. Miss Jane comes by with her date, Mr. Filbert. Miss Jane tells Granny and Elly she put in cards for them. The men come in and Burt is for Granny and Hugh (Paul Christman) is for Elly. Granny thinks young Hugh is for her.
160	22	"Elly Comes Out"	Joseph Depew	Mark Tuttle & Deborah Haber	February 15, 1967	5–22
Elly shows Granny Society Sandy's (Robert Strauss) column in the paper about an actress' coming-out party. Granny decides the best way to get Elly a husband is to throw her a coming-out party. Jethro calls the paper and talks to Society Sandy's secretary. She tells Sandy about Elly having the party. When Sandy learns about Jed's money, Sandy is interested. Drysdale and Miss Jane come by the mansion and see all the hillbilly decorations. Afraid they will be embarrassed, Drysdale wants to find someone to tell the Clampetts they're arranging the party all wrong. He asks Margaret if she'll help them make it a classy affair. Margaret, hoping to forever humiliate them, is all too happy to help make it a real hillbilly party. Margaret buys Elly a ridiculous red dress, claiming it is beautiful. Miss Jane and Drysdale come by and realize that Margaret double-crossed them. Thanks to an idea from Miss Jane, the party turns out to be a success, with even Society Sandy enjoying it.
161	23	"The Matador"	Joseph Depew	Paul Henning & Buddy Atkinson	February 22, 1967	5–23
Jethro decides to get a job. He goes to the movie studio and asks Lawrence Chapman if there are any openings for a director or a producer. After seeing the matador El Magnifico (Miguel Ángel Landa) with many female admirers, Jethro decides to become a bullfighter. Chapman tells Jethro that not only are matadors popular with the women, they make a lot of money. Jed decides to get a bull for Jethro, figuring they'll just wind up eating it. Meanwhile, Drysdale is upset with Chapman because the movie with El Magnifico is over budget. Drysdale changes his mind when he hears how many millions El Magnifico has. Drysdale hopes to have him and Elly marry. Elly gets upset when Jethro tries to wrestle his bull. Drysdale and Miss Jane come by the mansion. Drysdale tells Jed he has a man for Elly and takes her to meet him. Miss Jane shows Jethro how matadors fight a bull. Elly is watching El Magnifico and doesn't like the way he's treating the bull. She throws him out of the arena. Jethro, dressed as a matador, goes after the bull. The bull throws Jethro out of the arena.
162	24	"The Gypsy's Warning"	Joseph Depew	Paul Henning & Buddy Atkinson	March 1, 1967	5–24
Granny sees two gypsies pull up in a wagon in front of the mansion. Narda and her son Yerko (Leon Belasco) tell Jed that for one dollar she will tell his future. Narda reads Granny's palm and is afraid to tell her what she saw. They get Granny to believe there is a curse on the house and they should leave before it is too late. It turns out Mrs. Drysdale hired the gypsies to scare the Clampetts away. Margaret mentions how much money the Clampetts have. Miss Jane tells Drysdale that Granny wants her money because she's going back to the hills. Narda comes back to run another scam on Granny involving a marriage prophecy to a tall dark stranger. Narda hopes Granny will marry Yerko. Granny changes her opinion of the gypsies and wants them to stay. Drysdale and Miss Jane dress as gypsies hoping to counter whatever Narda and Yerko have planned. Granny thinks gypsy Drysdale is whom she is supposed to marry and wants nothing to do with him. Yerko asks Granny to marry him and she turns him down as well. Drysdale finds out that Margaret hired the gypsies and wants them to leave. Narda tells Drysdale she can help him make a killing in the stock market. Drysdale is now interested. Everyone winds up dancing together.
163	25	"His Royal Highness"	Joseph Depew	Mark Tuttle & Deborah Haber	March 8, 1967	5–25
Jethro and Elly tell Jed that King Alexander of Sabalia (Jacques Bergerac) will be visiting the Drysdales. At the bank, Miss Jane thinks Alexander may make a good companion for Elly. Believing Alexander has a lot of money, Drysdale likes the idea. Alexander, who is actually in need of money, works as a busboy on a yacht. The currency of Sabalia is totally worthless. Drysdale, still thinking he is rich, takes Alex to meet Elly. Alex at first thinks Granny is Elly, but then he meets her. Jethro comes by in a uniform he got from the movie studio. Meanwhile, Mrs. Drysdale intends on setting the King up with her recently divorced niece Doreen (Victoria Carroll). Doreen mistakes uniformed Jethro for the King. It is not long before she's unimpressed with him. Drysdale finds out the King is broke. Elly is also unimpressed with Alexander and turns down his marriage proposal. Also guest-starring Edward Ashley as the yacht owner.
164	26	"Super Hawg"	Joseph Depew	Paul Henning & Buddy Atkinson	March 15, 1967	5–26
Drysdale tells Miss Jane that the baby hippopotamus that he donated to the children's zoo was returned. The hippo had advertising for the bank written on its side. When Granny spots it in Drysdale's back yard, she thinks it is a giant hog. Elly's not sure what it is, but she says it is not a hog. Granny would like to have it to turn it into future meals. Jed wants to talk to Drysdale to see if they can buy it. Granny tries to get the animal into her yard, but Jed stops her. She wants to win the blue ribbon for the biggest ham at the fair back in the hills. Drysdale agrees to sell the hippo to Jed for $200. Jethro goes around the neighborhood taking orders for pig meat. Elly now knows it is a hippopotamus and wants to take it to the zoo. Miss Jane tells Drysdale that the circus wants to know if he'll take a baby elephant. Drysdale learns that Granny wants to butcher the hippo. Elly is in the pool with the hippo. In the end, Drysdale sends the hippo and the elephant to the children's zoo.
165	27	"The Doctors"	Joseph Depew	Mark Tuttle & Deborah Haber	March 22, 1967	5–27
Granny continues her doctoring and has made a new batch of spring tonic. Granny wants to bring the tonic to the bank. Jed switches her tonic for homemade root beer. Dr. Roy Clyburn has a lunch date with Drysdale and arrives at the bank. He finds out Granny is giving the tonic to the secretaries. Granny forces Roy to take a drink of tonic. He tells Drysdale that he is going to files charges against Granny and leaves. Drysdale convinces Roy to invite Granny to his office to show her how modern medicine works. Because of the tonic he had, Granny believes Dr. Clyburn is interested in her romantically. At Clyburn's office, Granny notices that he doesn't have any patients, not knowing it is his afternoon off. The Clampetts decide that Clyburn needs to advertise. They all act in a TV commercial promoting Clyburn.
166	28	"Delovely and Scruggs"	Joseph Depew	Paul Henning & Buddy Atkinson	March 29, 1967	5–28
Lester Flatt and Earl Scruggs visit the Clampetts while Lester's wife, Gladys (Joi Lansing), heads to Mammoth Studios for a screen test. She wants to go by the stage name Gladys Delovely. Lester hopes to sabotage Gladys' chances to do well by having Jethro direct her. Gladys is quite surprised when she sees Jethro. Jethro lets it slip that it was Lester's idea. Despite Jethro being there, the test goes well. Official word won't come for 3 days while the film is being processed. Lester hopes three days in the Clampetts' cabin will discourage her. But Gladys is on to his plan and is determined to beat him at his own game. She pretends to enjoy living the country life. Gladys has Lester chopping wood and shucking corn til he's worn out. Miss Jane tells Gladys that the film turned out great and they have a contract ready for her to sign. In the end, Gladys changes her mind about being a star. Also guest-starring Bobs Watson as Harry Hogan and John Alvin as Harry Barth the photographer.
167	29	"The Little Monster"	Joseph Depew	Mark Tuttle & Deborah Haber	April 12, 1967	5–29
Granny thinks all her lye soap has been stolen. Turns out Jethro took it. Jethro wants to open a five-second car wash by dunking cars in their pool. Jed wants him to clean everything up. Drysdale tells Miss Jane that he's taking care of his nephew Milby (Teddy Eccles) while his parents are in Europe. Milby is spoiled rotten and loves money. The Clampetts agree to watch Milby for a while. Milby is happy when he learns how much money Jed has. Milby buys many of the antiques in the house from Jethro for pennies on the dollar. Jethro shows Milby his car wash. The ropes broke and the family truck is in the pool. Before Milby can haul off the antiques, Drysdale comes by the mansion. Drysdale punishes Milby by taking away his money belt.
168	30	"The Dahlia Feud"	Joseph Depew	Paul Henning & Buddy Atkinson	April 19, 1967	5–30
Mrs. Drysdale accuses Granny of theft when she finds Granny with a piece of lumber of hers. It was actually Elly's chimpanzee that took it. Margaret accidentally knocks Granny into the pool. Granny wants to start a feud with Margaret. Drysdale wants Margaret to stop fighting with Granny. The lumber was to frame her new dahlia flower bed. Mrs. Drysdale hired gardener Mr. Ted (Ted Cassidy) to help her raise her dahlias. More of her garden supplies go missing. Margaret finds Granny with the missing shovel. Granny winds up in the pool again. Jed calls Drysdale and warns him that Granny's mad. Miss Jane discovers it was Elly's Chimp taking the things and tells Margaret. Granny runs into Mr. Ted and she tells Jed what a large man he is. Granny thinks he has been hired to kill the Clampetts. Drysdale tells Margaret that she should name her 4 dahlia beds after each of the Clampetts. Granny sees the 4 holes in the ground and the markers with their names. Granny begs Mrs. Drysdale and Mr. Ted to bury her and spare the others. They explain to her that the holes in the ground are dahlia beds and not graves. Note: Latest episode to be remastered on DVD (2018)

=== Season 6 (1967–68) ===
No. overall	No. in season	Title	Directed by	Written by	Original release date	Prod. code
169	1	"Jed Inherits a Castle"	Joseph Depew	Paul Henning & Buddy Atkinson	September 6, 1967	6–1
Jed learns that he inherited a castle in England from a distant relative. Jethro proceeds to prepare them for their journey across the pond as part of royalty. He wants them to all dress in royal raiment except Granny, because she's not a blood relative of Jed. Jethro dresses Granny up as an oaf but she doesn't stay one for long. Drysdale and Miss Jane come by and she tries to explain how things are in England now. Drysdale gets Miss Jane to help talk Jed into going to England. Jethro still wants his oaf so Drysdale has Miss Jane dress as one. Granny now puts on a royal dress. The family puts on their regular clothes and go to the passport office. The Passport Agent (Paul Lynde) thinks the Clampetts are playing a joke on him. He thinks he's on a hidden camera show. Miss Jane tells Jethro that oafs are men, so Drysdale now must wear the clothes. The Clampetts head to the airport in their royally decorated truck. Miss Jane and Drysdale will follow on a later flight.
170	2	"The Clampetts in London"	Joseph Depew	Paul Henning & Buddy Atkinson	September 13, 1967	6–2
The Clampetts are on the plane for England to check out their new castle. Jethro tells the Stewardess that the family is royalty and she just plays along. They stop first in San Francisco, where Jethro, thinking they are in England, points out all of the London landmarks. The Cab Driver (Larry J. Blake) has to explain to Jethro where they really are. Back on the plane, Jethro, the Royal Taster, insists on sampling the airline's food before it is served to Jed. Once they land in England, Cedric Giles-Evans (Ernest Clark), a lawyer representing the estate, meets the family. They have a confusing conversation about Jed's late cousin Marcus. Granny gets upset when her medical supplies and her jug of moonshine are impounded by Customs. Jethro and Elly try to see the Queen. Jed and Granny head to a chemist's shop to replace her medical supplies. The elderly chemist (Alan Napier) doesn't understand what Granny wants and begins to quote Shakespeare's Sonnets. Granny thinks he's courting her. The Chauffeur (John Barron) takes Jethro and Elly to Buckingham Palace. When Jethro and Elly return they all head off for their castle. Also guest-starring Hugh Dempster and John Orchard as the Customs Inspectors.
171	3	"Clampett Castle"	Joseph Depew	Paul Henning & Buddy Atkinson	September 20, 1967	6–3
The Clampetts finally arrive at Jed's castle. They are met by John Faversham (Richard Caldicot), the Head of the castle staff. Granny and Jed still don't understand that cousin Marcus has died. Granny goes to doctor Marcus. Meanwhile Jethro starts fulfilling his duty as a knight in shining armor and wants to start hunting for dragons. He wants Elly to be a damsel in distress. Jethro goes riding on a horse, but it is not long before he's knocked off. Granny believes that a dog has eaten Marcus. Drysdale arrives in town and meets up with Cedric Giles-Evans to discuss the estate. Cedric gets a call from Faversham about confusion at the castle. Drysdale heads to the castle. Elly is up in a tower of the castle yelling for help, hoping a handsome knight will come. Jethro is still riding horseback around the grounds and keeps getting knocked off. Granny tells Jed about the dog, but he has a hard time believing it. Drysdale arrives at the castle. Also guest-starring Sheila Fearn as Young Lady.
172	4	"Robin Hood of Griffith Park"	Joseph Depew	Paul Henning & Buddy Atkinson	September 27, 1967	6–4
Jethro is still riding around the castle grounds looking for dragons. Drysdale tells Jed that if he stays at the castle, he'll have to pay 10 million dollars back tax. Granny wants to leave England until she thinks the feudal system means feuding with the neighboring castle. They set their dogs on Jethro when he rode through their roses. Jed says they're going home. Before they leave, Jed gives Faversham a check for the 10 million. Meanwhile, Jethro now wants to live the life of Robin Hood. Once back in America, Granny and Elly are still angry over not feuding with the other castle. Jethro decides to continue his Robin Hood ways. Drysdale tries to think of a way to get some money out of the castle. Jethro and Elly, dressed as Robin Hood, go to a local version of Sherwood Forest. Hippie Buddy (Alan Reed Jr.) and his girlfriend Stella (Laurel Goodwin) are in the woods. Jethro and Elly run into them. Buddy and Stella are interested in Jethro's talk of "smoking crawdads". Miss Jane, Jed, and Granny come looking for Jethro and Elly. Buddy runs into them and asks about the crawdads.
173	5	"Robin Hood and the Sheriff"	Joseph Depew	Paul Henning & Buddy Atkinson	October 4, 1967	6–5
Jethro and Elly are still pretending to be Robin Hood and Maid Marian in Griffith Park. Buddy brings a large group of Hippies to the park to follow their new leader Jethro. Meanwhile, Drysdale suggests to Jed that he turn his castle into a car wash. Jed, Granny, Drysdale and Miss Jane go searching for Jethro and Elly. Dysdale is captured by Jethro and is first made to wear hippie clothes. Then he is given Robin Hood clothes. Jethro and the Hippies go searching for crawdads. Drysdale is later confronted by two park policemen, Fred and Tony (Victor French), who think he's crazy. Jed finds Elly feeding a baby deer. Granny runs into Drysdale and the policemen. After she mentions smoking crawdads, the policemen grab a hold of her. When the hippies find out what crawdads really are, they decide to leave Jethro and the forest. The policemen see the Hippies running by and go after them, leaving Granny. Also guest-starring Robert V. Barron as Harold and Paul De Rolf as Paul. The band Peppermint Trolley Company perform.
174	6	"Greetings From the President"	Guy Scarpitta	Paul Henning & Buddy Atkinson	October 11, 1967	6–6
The Clampetts are going back to Silver Dollar City for a festival. Before they leave, Jethro receives a draft notice. Jed will stay home to make sure things go smoothly with Jethro. Granny and Elly will fly back to the hills. Jed tells Drysdale that he wants to pay what it costs the Army to train Jethro. Jethro comes by dressed in a WWII German general's uniform that he got from the movie studio. Jed pays for Jethro to buy an old tank. Jethro is now dressed like General Patton and takes Drysdale with him to Griffith Park. Cousin Pearl (Bea Benaderet) calls Jed to tell him Granny and Elly arrived. They then talk about Jethro. At the park, Drysdale is now dressed as the German general. Jethro fires the cannon on the tank and Drysdale gets into a boat and rows away. Jethro shoots at Drysdale and he comes back. Jethro gets into the boat and wants Drysdale to try and shoot at him. Two police officers named Fred and Charley (Henry Corden) come by. Charley recognizes Drysdale as a guy in his WWII army unit who scammed him out of some money. They arrest Drysdale as Jed heads out to pay his bail.
175	7	"The Army Game"	Joseph Depew	Paul Henning & Buddy Atkinson	October 18, 1967	6–7
Miss Jane calls Jed asking if Granny and Elly are back from the hills yet. Drysdale is released from jail after being arrested for the tank incident in the park. Back at the bank he finds out his picture is on the front of the newspaper. Jethro brings Granny and Elly back from the airport in his tank. Drysdale and Miss Jane come by the mansion. Drysdale tells Granny that Jethro will have to take a physical for the Army. Granny decides to give him the physical and it doesn't go well for Jethro. Jethro reports to the induction center and sees Colonel Stark (Paul Reed). Because of Granny's physical, Jethro is limping and he can't hear. An Army Psychiatrist (King Donovan) tells Stark that he thinks Jethro is a genius in the way he pretends to be crazy to avoid military service. Stark says that Drysdale personally recommended Jethro. The Psychiatrist shows Stark the picture of Drysdale in the paper dressed as a German general. Jethro brings the family to see Stark. Things get a little confusing, but the Psychiatrist still thinks Jethro is a genius. They'd like to find him a place in Army Intelligence. Also guest-starring Joe Conley as Sergeant.
176	8	"Mr. Universe Muscles In"	Joseph Depew	Mark Tuttle & Deborah Haber	October 25, 1967	6–8
Banker John Cushing (Roy Roberts) has set Elly up with singer Troy Apollo (John Ashley). Granny is excited and is trying to find ways for Troy to propose to Elly. Drysdale hears about Troy and gets worried that he'll lose the Clampett account to Cushing. Before Troy shows up, Drysdale wants to set Elly up with someone else. Drysdale brings by Mr. Universe, Dave Draper. Jed and Granny are concerned about his muscles. Doctor Granny is convinced he is afflicted with barbell bloat and wants to cure him. Dave and Elly go to the pool. When Troy arrives, Drysdale makes him believe Miss Jane is Elly and Troy leaves in a hurry. Dave tells Elly she is pretty enough to be "Miss Universe". Because they believe Universe is Dave's last name, the Clampetts think that he wants to marry her. Elly tells Dave all about her critters and he is getting bored. Cushing sends Troy back and this time Troy believes Granny is Elly and leaves. Granny comes up with what she thinks will cure Dave and makes him take a spoonful of it. Cushing comes to the mansion with Troy. This time Troy thinks Elly's chimp is Elly. After Dave sees Elly lift a large barbell, he wants to eat the same food Elly does.
177	9	"A Plot for Granny"	Joseph Depew	Paul Henning & Buddy Atkinson	November 1, 1967	6–9
Granny's birthday is coming up. Since Granny's not doing well growing corn in the backyard, Jed thinks the solution is to buy her a plot of land somewhere else as a gift. Jethro tells Jed he saw a sign that said "Buy a plot at Happy Valley". Jed calls Mr. Mortimer (Jesse White), Happy Valley's owner, not knowing it is a cemetery. After Mortimer learns how much money Jed has, he tells his salesman Mr. Brubaker (Richard Deacon) to try and sell Jed a family plot. Elly shows Jed a store manikin that Miss Jane got her. Elly dressed it up to look like Granny to use as a scarecrow. Jed has her hide it in the back of the truck until Granny's birthday. Mr. Brubaker arrives at the mansion. From the way Jed describes things, Brubaker believes they murdered Granny. Brubaker tells Mortimer, but Mortimer just wants to make a sale. Granny is all stiff from trying to be a scarecrow. She has Cousin Bessie the Chimp pour her some of her moonshine. Jed and Elly put the manikin in a wooden chest that Jethro built for Granny. Brubaker and Mortimer arrive and have a confusing conversation with Jed. They see Granny's alive and leave. Granny sees the manikin and tells Jed she won't touch her moonshine again.
178	10	"The Social Climbers"	Joseph Depew	Mark Tuttle & Deborah Haber	November 8, 1967	6–10
Granny is trying to annoy Mrs. Drysdale by blowing lye soap smoke into her yard. Granny gets a letter from her old friend, the socialite Adaline Ashley (Mary Wickes). Adaline will be coming for a visit. Jed tells Drysdale that he's sure Margaret would like to meet Adaline. Drysdale knows that Margaret won't have anything to do with another hillbilly. Adaline arrives and tells Granny she's a widow now. Granny sets to playing matchmaker for her and Jed. Jed is then aggressively courted by Adaline. Thanks to Miss Jane, Mrs. Drysdale and her snooty friends are misled to believe Adaline is a real socialite jet setter. Margaret comes by the mansion and is very sweet to Granny. She asks Granny if Adaline could be her house-guest for a couple weeks. Adaline is still talking marriage with Jed, but Jed isn't interested. Adaline shows up at a shocked Mrs. Drysdale's doorstep.
179	11	"Jethro's Military Career"	Joseph Depew	Paul Henning & Buddy Atkinson	November 15, 1967	6–11
Elly is playing with her pet seal by the pool. Jethro comes by in a frogman outfit and tells her he wants to join the Navy. Elly catches Granny making moonshine, but she claims it is flu medicine. Jed thinks Granny has had too much moonshine when she mistakes Jethro in the frogman suit for a sea monster. When Jed wants to dump her moonshine, Granny says she was just kidding about the monster. Granny gets pulled into the pool by Jethro. Jethro comes in the kitchen in his suit. Once Granny realizes that it was him all along, she gets upset with him. Jethro tells Jed he has a demolition charge in the pool. Just as Granny takes another sip of the moonshine, the explosion goes off. Jethro is blown into the air. Meanwhile, Drysdale shows Miss Jane his "Money Man" comic book. She tells Drysdale that Jed called and wants help with Jethro. Drysdale distracts Jethro with comic books causing him to want to fly to the moon to meet the Moon Maidens there. Jethro buys a rocket to fly to the moon and puts it in the mansion's driveway. He then uses Granny's moonshine as rocket fuel. Jethro has to be rescued at sea by a navy helicopter.
180	12	"The Reserve Program"	Joseph Depew	Paul Henning & Buddy Atkinson	November 22, 1967	6–12
While heading to the Clampetts for Jethro's farewell breakfast, Drysdale tells Miss Jane more about his Money Man Comic books. At the breakfast, everyone gives Jethro a present. Granny gives him an ancestor's Confederate Army uniform. Granny forces Jethro to wear the uniform when he heads down to the Army Reserves Headquarters. Colonel Blake (Lyle Talbot) thinks Jethro's an actor there to participate in a Civil War reenactment. Blake is a technical advisor for the reenactment. Blake tells Jethro that he'll be fighting Union soldiers. Jethro runs home to tell Granny the Civil War is starting up again. Granny prepares to help with the fight. She gets dressed up to seduce some Yankees and get some information. She and Elly go to the Reserves Headquarters to do some spying. Granny overhears Blake talking to the men portraying General Grant (William Mims) and Col. Chittlen (Harry Fleer) about battle plans. At home Granny tells Jed that General Grant is still alive. Also guest-starring Bobby Pickett as Lieutenant.
181	13	"The South Rides Again"	Joseph Depew	Paul Henning & Buddy Atkinson	November 29, 1967	6–13
Granny still believes that General Grant is alive. Jed asks her why would Grant start a war in Beverly Hills. Meanwhile at the Army Reserves Headquarters, the actor playing Grant is very hung over. The producer of the Civil War movie wants Col. Blake to direct the battle scene. Blake and Grant get to the location where the filming will start. Blake is told the bus bringing the Confederate soldiers broke down and they are walking the rest of the way. Granny, Jethro and Elly are driving by and see the soldiers. Dressed in Confederate uniforms, "General" Drysdale and "Private" Hathaway arrive at the Clampett mansion. They are doing this to make Granny feel better, they don't know about the reenactment. During the filming, Grant keeps falling off his horse. When they get to the location, Drysdale is surprised when he hears the gunfire. Granny, Jethro and Elly come up to where all the fighting is. Granny wounds the actor playing Grant by shooting him with some of Ellie's cookies. Granny then has to cure him with her "rheumatism medicine". Grant and Granny discover they have something in common after all. Miss Jane calls Jed and tells him they found out it was just a movie shoot. Jed doesn't want to ruin things by telling Granny. Granny and Grant come to the mansion drunk. Also guest-starring Harry Lauter as Captain.
182	14	"Jethro in the Reserve"	Joseph Depew	Paul Henning & Buddy Atkinson	December 6, 1967	6–14
Col. Blake comes by the Clampett mansion to talk about Jethro joining the Reserves. Granny doesn't want Jethro joining up with Union soldiers. Granny calls Drysdale and threatens to take her money out of the bank because he left when the fighting started. Col. Blake asks the actor playing Gen. Grant to play along with Granny so that the Civil War movie can continue. When Grant hears how much money Granny has, he agrees to go. Blake brings Grant to the mansion and Grant and Granny go off into the parlor. Blake takes Jethro back to the Army Reserves Headquarters. Drysdale comes by the mansion dressed in the Confederate uniform pretending to be wounded. He tries to make Granny believe he didn't run from the fight but rather was chasing after Grant. Drysdale tells Granny that he killed Grant. She then shows Drysdale Grant is very much alive and Drysdale leaves. Elly comes in wearing a bathing suit. Grant upsets Granny when he starts to make a play for Elly. To catch Grant's eye, Granny puts on a bathing suit as well, but she winds up throwing him in the pool. Meanwhile, Jethro uses his 6th grade education to take the written test to enter the Reserves. Grant is filming a scene again and Granny shoots him off his horse.
183	15	"Cimarron Drip"	Guy Scarpitta	Mark Tuttle & Deborah Haber	December 13, 1967	6–15
Jethro believes his moment for Hollywood stardom has arrived. He asks Dash Riprock (Larry Pennell) for a part in his new cowboy TV series "Bachelor Sheriff Knows Best". Dash tells him all the parts have been cast. Meanwhile, Lawrence Chapman (Milton Frome) tells Drysdale that they won't be able to film the TV series. The child star that was to be in it made unreasonable demands. Drysdale suggests a monkey instead of a kid and mentions Elly's pet chimpanzee Cousin Bessie. Chapman comes by the mansion with his director, Otto Von Schlepper (Theo Marcuse). Von Schlepper says that Bessie is perfect. Jethro mistakenly thinks he has been chosen. Dash asks Drysdale and Chapman if they could find Jethro a job on the show. Miss Jane asks Dash if there's a part for her. Jethro doesn't like the very large horse that Elly got for him. He tries to show Dash his fast draw and almost shoots his feet. Jethro finds out that Bessie is going to be the co-star of the series. Jethro ruins Cousin Bessie's chance when he becomes her agent and changes her appearance.
184	16	"Corn Pone Picassos"	Joseph Depew	Mark Tuttle & Deborah Haber	December 20, 1967	6–16
Drysdale tells Miss Jane that Margaret bought an expensive art sculpture and wants to enter it in an art contest. Meanwhile, a Truck Driver (Frank Richards) pulls up to the Clampett mansion. He has Margaret's sculpture and it looks like a large pile of scrap. Margaret comes by and tells the driver he's at the wrong house. Granny wants to help Mrs. Drysdale win. So, she paints a picture to give to her to enter instead of the sculpture. The picture is of Jethro's open mouth. Jed wants to get a better painting for Margaret. Jed and Jethro go to an upscale gallery to buy a painting. The owner, A. Allen Allen, mistakes them for gardeners. Bessie the chimp paints over Granny's picture. Granny and Elly go to the Drysdales and cover the sculpture with mud thinking it will look better. After they do the yard work, Jed and Jethro return to the gallery. A. Allen Allen learned who Jed was and apologizes. They buy a Sam Rembrandt for Mrs. Drysdale to enter. Bessie's painting winds up winning.
185	17	"The Clampetts Play Cupid"	Joseph Depew	Mark Tuttle & Deborah Haber	December 27, 1967	6–17
Jed and Jethro catch Granny waiting up for Elly to come home from her date with Dash Riprock. When they do get home, Dash is frightened away by Granny. Dash tells Drysdale and Miss Jane that he's seriuos about Elly, but the Clampetts keep interfering. Granny asks Elly when she's going to marry Dash. Elly says that she's not going to marry Dash as she wants a man who'll live in the country in a log cabin and raise pigs. Granny feels bad for Dash and decides it is time to do a little matchmaking for him. Miss Jane comes by to tell Granny about Dash's intentions. Granny thinks the handsome actor would be perfect for Miss Jane. Dash arrives to see Elly. Granny really talks up Miss Jane to him. Dash wants to take Elly to a premiere of his movie that night. Granny has a very elaborate plan to make Dash want to take Miss Jane instead, but it isn't working. Elly tells Dash the type of man she wants to marry. Dash is no longer interested in Elly and takes Miss Jane to the premiere.
186	18	"The Housekeeper"	Guy Scarpitta	Mark Tuttle & Deborah Haber	January 3, 1968	6–18
Miss Jane comes by the mansion and sees Granny working herself to death cleaning the place. Jed and Elly come to the bank and tell Drysdale that they're worried about Granny overworking. Based upon Mrs. Drysdale's recommendation, Drysdale hires Mrs. Meek (Fran Ryan) as a housekeeper for the Clampetts. Granny is against the idea, but Drysdale talks her into it. Mrs. Meek arrives and she is not very pleasant. It is not long before Granny finds out that Mrs. Meek is quite uninterested in doing housework. Granny tries to think of a way to get rid of her. Granny messes up the house. Drysdale and Miss Jane come by and see the mess. Mrs. Meek saves them the trouble when she quits. Granny is very happy. Drysdale tells Jed he'll find another housekeeper. Jed sees how happy Granny is and tells him not to bother.
187	19	"The Diner"	Joseph Depew	Mark Tuttle & Deborah Haber	January 10, 1968	6–19
Jed wants to talk to Jethro about setting him up in business. All Jethro is interested in is food. Jethro decides he wants to be a fry cook in his own restaurant. Drysdale is worried that Jed will spend too much money on the restaurant. Jethro tells Drysdale and Miss Jane that he's going to call his place "The Happy Gizzard". Drysdale finds a place and the family goes to see it. They pass several beautiful restaurants and then come to a small condemned diner. Jed and Granny don't think much about the place, but Jethro is thrilled. It is not long before the family has the place fixed up. But, Jethro is having no luck attracting customers. A woman comes in, but she just wants to use the telephone. She agrees to have something to eat, but everything goes wrong when Jethro tries to prepare it. She leaves and Jed, Granny, and Elly show up to help him out.
188	20	"Topless Anyone?"	Joseph Depew	Mark Tuttle & Deborah Haber	January 17, 1968	6–20
Jethro's new diner, The Hungry Gizzard, isn't attracting any customers. Granny is tired of cooking food for the diner and there's no one to eat it. After driving by all the restaurants that have the most customers, Jethro realizes that they all have something in common. Jethro tells the family that they all advertise "topless waitresses". Jethro thinks it means that the waitresses don't wear hats. Meanwhile, Drysdale is trying to impress the wealthy Vanderponts (Ysabel MacCloskey & James Stone). Jethro bursts in and announces his restaurant is going topless. The Vanderponts leave. Jed has a confusing conversation with a Truck Driver (Robert Foulk) about the diner getting topless waitresses. Jed brings Drysdale some of Granny's moonshine as a headache remedy. Jed meets the Vanderponts. Mrs. Vanderpont asks if she could have some of the tonic. Miss Jane explains to Granny and Jethro what topless really means. Jed tells Drysdale to invite the Vanderponts to The Happy Gizzard. They arrive to the diner and the Clampetts find out that the Vanderponts are actually mountain folk. Mr. Vanderpont buys The Hungry Gizzard from Jethro.
189	21	"The Great Snow"	Joseph Depew	Paul Henning & Buddy Atkinson	January 24, 1968	6–21
Granny complains that it is January and there is no snow. Granny tells Jed that she would like to go back to the hills because she misses the winter season. Jed tells her she used to hate the snow. Jed calls Drysdale and tells him Granny wants to go back home, which sends Drysdale into a panic. Drysdale enlists Miss Jane in an elaborate scheme to convince Granny that a blizzard is about to occur at the mansion. He has Miss Jane set the air conditioner in the mansion to very cold. Drysdale calls Chapman at the movie studio and arranges for snow machines to be sent to the mansion after dark. They'll also place fake wolves around the home. That night, the Clampetts are cold and out of food because Jethro ate it all. Drysdale and Miss Jane come by with food. Elly brings in one of the stuffed wolves. Granny thinks it froze solid. Jed figures out that the snow and wolves are not real. Drysdale blames Miss Jane for the hoax and Jed thanks her for trying to make Granny happy. Now they just need to make sure Granny doesn't find out.
190	22	"The Rass'lin' Clampetts"	Joseph Depew	Paul Henning & Buddy Atkinson	January 31, 1968	6–22
Granny's been in a bad mood lately. The family puts up the cabin to cheer her up. After Mrs. Drysdale complains to Granny about her cabin, they have a physical brawl. Jed tries explaining to Granny that womenfolk in the city don't settle their differences through violence. Jethro says "Yes they do" and tells them about the women wrestlers on TV. That night the family watches as "The Boston Strong Girl" enters the ring. The Strong Girl is to wrestle the sweet country girl, "Rebecca of Donnybrook Farm". When the Strong Girl beats up on Rebecca, Granny believes the wrestling is real and gets upset. Drysdale and Miss Jane are watching the match as well at his house. While Jed is signing some papers for Miss Jane, Jethro and Granny leave the room. Granny decides to rescue Rebecca. As Jed and Elly are still watching the program, they witness Granny jump into the ring and teach the Boston Strong Girl to not beat up on a Tennessee girl. Also guest-starring Gene LeBell as Referee.
191	23	"The Great Tag-Team Match"	Joseph Depew	Paul Henning & Buddy Atkinson	February 7, 1968	6–23
At first Granny doesn't want to be congratulated for beating up "The Boston Strong Girl", but then she likes the attention from the family. Promoter Gene Booth (Alan Reed) asks Strong Girl who changed the script and put the little old lady in the ring. Rebecca tells Booth that Granny isn't an actor, but a real old lady from Tennessee. Booth learns that the televised wrestling match was such a success that the people want a rematch. Booth and Rebecca go to see the Clampetts. Booth asks about a rematch, but Granny says she's retiring undefeated. Jed writes a check to pay off the mortgage on Rebecca's farm. Thinking Jed is just part of the help, Booth expects the check to bounce and then he can force Granny to fight. At the bank, Booth learns Jed's check is good, but Drysdale tears it up. Booth brings Rebecca's "parents" (Merie Earle & Jerry Brutsche) to the Clampetts. Booth tells Jed that Rebecca's parents are too proud to accept his check. Granny, Jed and Elly are convinced to fight. But Granny doesn't need any help to beat the Boston Strong Girl and her parents (Mike Mazurki & Margo Epper).
192	24	"Jethro Proposes"	Guy Scarpitta	Mark Tuttle & Deborah Haber	February 21, 1968	6–24
Granny is worried about Miss Jane's spinsterhood. She thinks Jed should ask her to marry him. Granny is sure that Miss Jane will decline the proposal, but will be thrilled to be asked. When Jed says no, Granny bribes Jethro with a lot of food to do it. Jethro goes to the bank to ask Miss Jane out and meets a new employee, Ilse. Jethro falls for her. Jethro does ask Miss Jane to have dinner with him that night. At the fancy restaurant there is some confusion between the Waiter (Fritz Feld) and Jethro. Granny, dressed as a man with a mustache, and Elly are in the next booth. After Granny reminds him why he's there, Jethro asks Miss Jane for her hand. Miss Jane accepts leading Jethro, Granny and Elly to panic. Miss Jane tells Drysdale she regrets her decision. Granny mixes up a batch of anti-love potion. It smells so bad, Jed wants it buried. At the bank, Miss Jane tells Jethro she can't marry him and hopes he can forget her. The next time her and Drysdale look at Jethro, he's kissing Ilse.
193	25	"The Clampetts Fiddle Around"	Joseph Depew	Mark Tuttle & Deborah Haber	February 28, 1968	6–25
Miss Jane tells Granny about the concert her and Jethro went to the night before. They went to see Sebastian Stromboli (Hans Conried), a famed classical violin virtuoso. Jethro is on to his next big idea and wants to play the violin as a means of attracting women. Jed asks Miss Jane to try and hire Stromboli, but she doesn't think he'd be interested. Drysdale is not happy about the prospect of Jed spending a lot of money to hire Stromboli. Miss Jane is surprised when Stromboli agrees to give beginning violin lessons to Jethro. Stromboli arrives at the mansion. Jed asks him to teach Jethro some songs from back in the hills, but Stromboli says he's never heard of them. Stromboli starts playing a slow song and Jethro falls asleep. Jed and Granny want fiddle music so they call on Fiddlin Sam Dingle (Foster Brooks). Stromboli tells Jed and Granny that he can't teach Jethro anything. Fiddlin Sam arrives. When Stromboli learns that Sam Dingle makes 2 million a year, he joins in on the fiddle music.
194	26	"The Soap Opera"	Joseph Depew	Mark Tuttle & Deborah Haber	March 6, 1968	6–26
Jethro has set up the truck to be an ambulance. Granny is sad because she has no one to doctor. Miss Jane tells Elly about a soap opera she's going to watch with a character named Dr. Rex Goodbody (John Dehner). Elly mentions Goodbody to Granny. Granny and Jethro arrive at the bank and see the TV show. Granny confuses the soap opera with real life and decides her doctoring can save Dr. Rex Goodbody from a serious operation. Drysdale believes Granny is just a big fan of Goodbody's and tells her he lives near her. She tries to see him, but no one answers the door. Drysdale has Goodbody come by the bank. Drysdale tells him he's being written off the show and coerces him into visiting Granny. Goodbody arrives at the mansion and Granny thinks he wants her medical advice. Goodbody makes a play for Granny and her money. That doesn't go well and Granny chases him out of the house. Goodbody is making his last appearance on the show and the Clampetts arrive to save him. Also guest-starring Grandon Rhodes as Doctor.
195	27	"Dog Days"	Joseph Depew	Mark Tuttle & Deborah Haber	March 13, 1968	6–27
Jed is upset with Elly because she's washing all her dogs in the pool. He thinks she has too many critters. When Granny calls for the family to come and eat, all the dog run to her and knock her down. Granny is on the warpath and declares either the dogs go or she does. Meanwhile, Drysdale is equally irritated by the expense of his wife's poodle. Jed tells Elly he'll try and talk Granny into keeping the dogs. The dogs melt Granny's heart and she lets them stay. Elly brings home even more dogs from the pet shop. They run into the house and knock Granny down. Granny again wants the critters gone. Elly brings the dogs to the bank and Drysdale jokingly says they could stay in his office. Elly lets the dogs run into the office. Jethro sees Ilse walking Mrs. Drysdale's dog in front of the bank. Drysdale and Miss Jane come to the mansion and tell Jed about the dogs at the bank. Jethro and Ilse give Mrs. Drysdale's dog a haircut, which she actually likes. Once again the dogs melt Granny's heart and they can stay. Also guest-starring Paul De Rolf as Man on the street.
196	28	"The Crystal Gazers"	Joseph Depew	Mark Tuttle & Deborah Haber	March 20, 1968	6–28
Jethro tries to see the future with a plastic crystal ball he ordered. Granny believes she has psychic abilities and the power to predict the future. One of Granny's predictions about a couple back in the hills comes true. Miss Jane comes by and Granny makes several more predictions. Granny calls Elverna Bradshaw and finds out that Elverna told her about the couple a while back and Granny forgot. Elly says that Granny's prediction that she would have 7 youngsters came true. It turns out they're puppies. Granny now thinks she does have powers. Granny and Jed find out that Elly went to the pet shop to get the puppies so Granny would feel better. Jethro is still having no luck with his crystal ball. Granny believes that her other predictions will come true. With her reputation on the line, she picks a stock for Drysdale, saying he will come into a lot of money. Miss Jane tells Drysdale that the stock he bought is a stage coach manufacturer and that could cost him a small fortune. But, Jed buys the company so the stock will go up.
197	29	"From Rags to Riches"	Joseph Depew	Paul Henning & Buddy Atkinson	March 27, 1968	6–29
The family has just finished putting up the cabin in the back. Drysdale tells Miss Jane he wants to film a Super Banker commercial with the old Clampett cabin. He will use the Clampetts as hillbillies who were raised from poverty by his bank. Miss Jane doesn't like the idea and wants to quit. Drysdale guarantees her a large nest egg if she stays. The only problem is that Miss Jane discovers it is a literal egg and breaks it over Drysdale's head. The shack's return has Mrs. Drysdale unhappy. Her and Granny get into a scuffle. Drysdale comes by and wants to explain things to Margaret in the cabin. Margaret throws Milburn through the cabin's door. Drysdale is in a daze and they bring him in the kitchen. Granny has on her doctor clothes and decides Drysdale needs a head transplant. She found some egg shell and thinks that's Drysdale's thin skull. She gives him some of her moonshine. Granny is trying to decide on a donor head. Drysdale comes to and still wants to film the commercial. He has the Clampetts dress hillbilly shabby. Jed says they should humor him. Miss Jane starts filming and Drysdale is in his green Super Banker costume. They then film the part where they are well dress millionaires.
198	30	"Cousin Roy"	Joseph Depew	Paul Henning & Buddy Atkinson	April 3, 1968	6–30
Granny is cooking a special meal for Cousin Roy (Roy Clark), who is coming from the hills for a visit. Granny likes Roy, but she is not fond of his mother, Myrtle Halsey. Roy arrives and apparently he's in town to open up a distribution point for Mother Myrtle's Tonic. Granny isn't very keen on any competition against her own tonic, especially from Myrtle. Myrtle calls and asks Jed to help Roy set up his business. Jed recommends Roy talk to Drysdale. Jethro is not thrilled about the idea of double dating with Roy. Hoping he'll get in trouble, Jethro suggests that Roy set up a stand outside of the Commerce Bank. A large crowd gathers around. When a Policeman (Peter Leeds) comes by to check things out, he recognizes Mother Myrtle's tonic as he is from the hills as well. Meanwhile, believing she is a wealthy business owner, Drysdale flies Myrtle in to visit Granny. Granny and Jethro set up a stand outside the bank and a crowd gathers. The same Policeman comes by. He mentions that he had some of Myrtle's Tonic. Jethro holds him and Granny forces him to drink her tonic. The two get arrested. Drysdale has them bailed out and Myrtle arrives at the mansion dressed as a young woman. Also guest-starring Phil Arnold as Maintenance Man. Note: Roy Clark plays a dual role as Cousin Roy and Mother Myrtle.

=== Season 7 (1968–69) ===
No. overall	No. in season	Title	Directed by	Written by	Original release date	Prod. code
199	1	"A Bundle for Britain"	Joseph Depew	Gene Thompson	September 25, 1968	7–1
Drysdale and Miss Jane come by the mansion and tell the Clampetts they now have $80 million. The family doesn't seem excited. Jed feels that taking care of his money has been a burden on Drysdale. To make things easier for Drysdale, Granny suggests burying the money in the backyard. Jethro says they should give the money to England because they're broke. He heard on the radio that the city of Philadelphia bought Queen Elizabeth. Jed calls John Faversham (Richard Caldicot) at Jed's castle in England. Faversham says that it was ships that were sold. Jed still misunderstands and thinks England is in need of money. Jed tells Drysdale that he's taking his money out of the bank and Drysdale faints. Drysdale hires British actor Montrose (Alan Mowbray) to try and talk the Clampetts out of giving their money away. When Montrose learns how much money Jed has, he comes up with a scam to have Jed buy Canada for the Queen, saying that that would help her much more. Note: This is the first episode with Nancy Kulp and Raymond Bailey featured in the opening credits.
200	2	"Something for the Queen"	Joseph Depew	Buddy Atkinson & Gene Thompson	October 2, 1968	7–2
Jethro smuggles Ellie's turkey buzzard on the plane to England, hoping to use it to hunt oafs. Jethro tells the Stewardess that they own Canada and will give the deed to the Queen. Drysdale and Miss Jane board the plane. The turkey buzzard causes problems for Drysdale and a fellow passenger (Dick Wesson). Granny tells Miss Jane that she thinks Drysdale is acting strangely because he stuck his head outside the plane's window and got hit in the head by a goose. They finally land in England. Drysdale tells Jethro that he'll get the bird through customs, knowing that they'll quarantine it. There is some confusion between the Customs Inspector and Drysdale and Granny. The Clampetts had their truck shipped over and they go to Buckingham Palace. They hope to meet with the Queen to give her the deed to Canada. Drysdale meets them there and tells them it might take a few days to get an audience with the Queen. The Clampetts then go to their castle where Granny would like to reignite a year-old feud with the neighboring castle. Their butler Faversham tries to assure Granny that will be no trouble with the neighbors. But when Granny hears a cannon fired from next door, she believes their "War of the Roses" has begun. Also guest-starring Donald Bisset as Tetley, Jack Bannon as Customs Assistant, and Alister Williamson as Hotel Doorman.
201	3	"War of the Roses"	Joseph Depew	Buddy Atkinson & Gene Thompson	October 9, 1968	7–3
Jethro challenges Colonel Dumbarton (William Kendall) from the neighboring castle to a "War of the Roses". The Colonel remembers Jethro as the knight who rode through his rose bushes the year before and accepts. Drysdale calls Jed from his hotel. He tells Jed that he pulled some strings and Queen Elizabeth I will come to see him. Jethro plans to catapult himself into Dumbarton's castle. Elly goes along to hopefully meet a handsome knight. Elly cuts the rope and Jethro goes flying over the castle wall. Meanwhile, Granny is training some of the castle staff to help her fight. Jethro and Dumbarton determine that a joust is the best way to end the dispute. Before the joust, Dumbarton has quite a bit of Brandy. The two ride at each other and both are knocked from their horses. Granny helps Jethro up and she says they won the war. Drysdale dresses Miss Jane up as Queen Elizabeth I in an attempt to fool the Clampetts. Jed gives her the deed to Canada. Granny tells the Queen that the "War of the Roses" is over and the Clampetts are no longer cowards. Jethro asks the Queen to officially make him a knight. Also guest-starring Rosalind Knight appears as Vanessa, the Colonel's daughter.
202	4	"Coming Through the Rye"	Joseph Depew	Buddy Atkinson & Gene Thompson	October 16, 1968	7–4
While looking through his telescope, Jethro falls for Sandra MacGregor (Ilona Rodgers), the niece of Colonel Dumbarton at the neighboring castle. Jed and Granny think Dumbarton's nephew Emlyn MacGregor (David Prowse), a man wearing a kilt, is the girl that Jethro has fallen for. Sandra jokingly tells Jethro that she will marry him, but he thinks she's serious. Granny brings Dumbarton some more of her tonic which he enjoys. When Dumbarton talks about how beautiful his niece is, Granny thinks he's had too much tonic. Emlyn sees Elly and wants to court her. Granny asks Faversham what he thinks of the niece and she is surprised when he also says she's beautiful. Jethro tells Jed and Granny he's getting married tomorrow. Sandra tells Dumbarton that she was just joking with Jethro. Dumbarton feels he needs to tell them. Granny and Jed are upset over the idea that Jethro will marry what they think is an ugly woman. But when the Colonel tells them there will be no wedding, Granny feels jilted. She tells him she's cutting off his tonic. Miss Jane and Drysdale come by. Miss Jane explains to them that who they think is Sandra is actually a boy. The Clampetts finally meet Sandra and she says the guy is her brother. Sandra says she can't marry Jethro because she's a commoner and he's royalty. They have a celebration with dancing and everyone dressed in kilts.
203	5	"Ghost of Clampett Castle"	Joseph Depew	Buddy Atkinson	October 23, 1968	7–5
Granny wants to do some planting in the garden. Drysdale wants to get the Clampetts to move back to California. After something that Faversham says, Drysdale tells Granny about the spirit of Lady Clementine Clampett. Her husband was murdered in the Clampett castle. Lady Clementine then jumped out a window to her death. Lady Clementine's ghost is going to return to seek revenge on the person who killed her husband; her little old grandmother. Granny is scared and wants to go home. Jethro tells Drysdale and Miss Jane that he'll hold a seance to get rid of the ghost. Drysdale sets up a microphone and speaker in the seance room. He wants Miss Jane to dress as the ghost. Jethro starts the seance and Drysdale pretends he's the voice of the dead husband. After Granny fires off her shot gun, Miss Jane refuses to play the ghost. Drysdale hears Jed take the gun from Granny and he dresses up as the ghost. Granny gets the shot gun full of rock salt back and shoots the ghost. Drysdale is wailing in pain and scares Jethro. The next morning, as they're heading to the airport, Drysdale talks them out of going to say goodbye to the Queen.
204	6	"Granny Goes to Hooterville"	Joseph Depew	Buddy Atkinson & Dick Wesson	October 30, 1968	7–6
After the Clampetts return from London, Granny gets a letter from Hooterville asking her to help with Betty Jo Elliot's baby. Jed, Jethro and Elly have no idea who Betty Jo or her family is. Granny wants Jethro to drive her there. Granny calls Sam Drucker's store to try and get directions. Sam and Uncle Joe think it is a prank call. Miss Jane agrees to come over and fill in for Granny while she is away. Jethro gets sick when he eats some of Elly's stone grits that were supposed to be for her birds. Jethro goes running when Granny says she may have to give him a gizzard transplant. While reaching for something in a cabinet, Miss Jane hurts her back and Jed is trying to hold her up. Granny thinks Jed has fallen in love with Miss Jane. Drysdale see the two of them together and starts to believe the two will get married. Drysdale then begins to treat Miss Jane like a queen. They're at the bank and Drysdale is serving her champagne. He hires handsome Cliff (Aron Kincaid) to be her private secretary. Jed calls Drysdale and says that Jethro is better and Granny is going to Hooterville. Jed also says that Granny told him what she thought about Miss Jane and him being in love. Jed tells Drysdale that there will be no wedding. Drysdale is furious with Miss Jane. Guest stars from Petticoat Junction: Edgar Buchanan as Uncle Joe Carson and Frank Cady as Sam Drucker Note: This episode begins a crossover with Petticoat Junction that concludes on "Granny, the Baby Expert".
205	7	"The Italian Cook"	Joseph Depew	Paul Henning & Dick Wesson	November 6, 1968	7–7
Granny is still in Hooterville and Elly is doing the cooking. Jethro and Jed are doing what they can to avoid her food. Meanwhile, Granny tells Sam Drucker that the first time she saw Betty Jo's baby, it look like a puppy dog. Jethro calls Granny at Sam's store and tells her to come home to cook. She tells him that the Elliots' baby needs her. Miss Jane gets Jethro to hire Maria, a gorgeous Italian cook who speaks no English. Once Granny believes that she has cured the Elliots' baby, she decides to get home to her starving family as quickly as possible. She uses a rail hand car, a horse, a motorcycle and finally a ride in a crop dusting plane. When Drysdale learns Granny is coming home, he goes to the Clampetts to fire Marie. Jethro, Jed and Elly are really enjoying Maria's cooking. Jethro says he wants to marry her. Drysdale changes his mind when he sees how pretty Maria is and how great she can cook. Granny parachutes down to the mansion. She gets upset with Jethro when she realizes she raced home for nothing. Guest stars from Petticoat Junction: Linda Henning as Betty Jo, Mike Minor as Steve Elliott, and Frank Cady as Sam Drucker Note: This episode includes a clip from the Petticoat Junction episode "Granny, the Baby Expert" where Granny thinks the Elliots' baby had turned into their dog.
206	8	"The Great Cook-Off"	Joseph Depew	Paul Henning & Dick Wesson	November 13, 1968	7–8
Granny feels useless with Maria, the Italian cook, around. Jed tries to fire Maria, but she doesn't understand him. Jethro shows up at the bank in a Roman gladiator suit. He tells Miss Jane he's in love with Maria and is wearing the suit to impress her. Jed finds Granny laying in bed wearing a funeral dress. Jethro tries to cheer Granny up, but he just gets her mad. Jed wants Jethro to fire Maria. He misunderstands and gets Granny mad again. Jethro asks Drysdale to marry him and Maria. Miss Jane comes by the mansion to try and make peace between Maria and Granny. Miss Jane tells Jed if Maria loses her job, she'll be sent back to Italy. Granny is talking to Maria, who only knows the word yes, and starts to believe that she is after Jed. Jethro then believes that Jed wants to steal Maria away from him and challenges him to a gladiator duel. Jed talks Granny into making peace and she teaches Maria some of her dishes. Things don't go well for Jethro when he practices his gladiator duel with Elly.
207	9	"Bonnie, Flatt, and Scruggs"	Joseph Depew	Paul Henning & Buddy Atkinson	November 20, 1968	7–9
Jethro is still trying to teach their dog Duke to fetch. Lester Flatt, his wife Gladys (Joi Lansing), and Earl Scruggs visit the Clampetts. They are dressed up as Bonnie and Clyde because they have just come from a publicity shoot. Gladys sings Yes Sir, That's My Baby. Jethro and Elly dress up in the same costumes and go the Commerce Bank to scare Drysdale. The bank alarm goes off. Drysdale, thinking the crooks are coming for him, dresses like an old cleaning woman. In the confusion, Dysdale believes Homer Cratchit (Percy Helton), the bookkeeper, abandoned his post. To get back at Homer, Drysdale dresses up as a bank robber but gets caught by the police. Back at the mansion, Lester and Earl play Foggy Mountain Breakdown. Drysdale steals Miss Jane's idea to have everyone dress up as crooks for a "Super Banker" commercial. Everyone gets dressed up and they go to the bank. However, the commercial doesn't go quite as Drysdale planned as Homer punched him for the cheap pay enabling the "crooks" to get away.
208	10	"The Thanksgiving Spirit"	Joseph Depew	Paul Henning & Buddy Atkinson	November 27, 1968	7–10
Cheap Mr. Drysdale wants Miss Jane to cook one turkey for his 65 employees. The Clampetts want to visit Hooterville to celebrate Thanksgiving with the inhabitants and Betty Jo Elliot's baby. Mr. Drysdale doesn't want them to go, because he's afraid they'll stay there and take their money with them. He tries various ways to keep them from going. Drysdale even takes off some parts of their truck's engine. Miss Jane lets the Clampetts use her car. Jethro arrives at Sam Drucker's store and Eb Dawson volunteers to work for "The Star-Maker". Everyone in Hooterville believes Jethro is a big Hollywood producer. At the Shady Rest, Granny and Jed think they hear Elly flirting with a boy. Elly is really talking to the dog. Jethro tries to convince the lovely Billie Jo and Bobbie Jo that he can make them movie stars. They naively fall for his phony showbiz talk. Meanwhile, Eb Dawson is smitten with Elly and they spend some time together. Granny gets to see Steve and Betty Jo's baby again. It is time for the Thanksgiving Dinner and Jed says the prayer. Guest stars From Petticoat Junction: Edgar Buchanan as Uncle Joe Carson, Frank Cady as Sam Drucker, Linda Henning as Betty Jo, June Lockhart as Dr. Janet Craig, Meredith MacRae as Billie Jo, Mike Minor as Steve Elliott, and Lori Saunders as Bobbie Jo; From Green Acres: Eddie Albert as Oliver Douglas, Eva Gabor as Lisa Douglas, and Tom Lester as Eb Dawson
209	11	"The Courtship of Homer Noodleman"	Joseph Depew	Buddy Atkinson & Lou Huston	December 4, 1968	7–11
The Clampetts are about to leave Hooterville and go to say goodbye to Sam Drucker. Granny doesn't want to leave Sam and Elly doesn't want to leave Eb. They find Eb in the trunk of the car. While feeding Elly's critters, Drysdale tells Miss Jane how he still believes the Clampetts will move to Hooterville. Drysdale complains about all the things he has to do for Elly's bear. The Clampetts return and tell Drysdale about Eb and Elly and how they are practically engaged. Drysdale tells them he can get Elly a man and Granny tells him they like Eb because he's a country boy. To keep the Clampetts in Beverly Hills, Drysdale gets Hollywood actor Dash Riprock (Larry Pennell) to play homespun country boy Homer Noodleman. Homer Noodleman is Riprock's real name. Jed recognizes Dash, but Drysdale assures him he's a country boy at heart. Granny insists on meeting Homer's father. Drysdale forces Miss Jane to dress as Noble Noodleman with the promise of a large reward. When Miss Jane figures out that Drysdale misled her about the reward, she turns the tables on him. Guest stars: Frank Cady as Sam Drucker from Petticoat Junction and Tom Lester as Eb Dawson from Green Acres
210	12	"The Hot-Rod Truck"	Guy Scarpitta	Buddy Atkinson & Dick Wesson	December 11, 1968	7–12
To keep up with his Hollywood Producer image, Jethro trades the truck for a hot rod. Jethro brings to the mansion his latest discovery, Jeanie Rivers. Jed makes him take the hot rod back. Meanwhile, Miss Jane reminds Drysdale that it is Granny's birthday. Once again Miss Jane is saddened by how cheap Drysdale is. Granny overhears Jed and Jethro talking about the old truck and thinks they are talking about her. Jethro now shows up with a dune buggy and a hippie named Medicine Man (Lonnie Burr). Jethro gets upset again when Jed demands the truck. Granny tells Elly what she overheard and Elly can't believe Jed would get rid of her. Jethro finally brings the truck back and tells Jed it needs some new parts put in. Granny overhears this also and thinks they're going to put new parts in her to keep her working. Jed explains things to Granny. Jethro then has the truck turned into a hot rod. Jed tells Jethro to put the truck back to its original version Jethro comes back with another hot rod. Miss Jane tells Drysdale that Granny would like a dressed hog as a gift. Drysdale comes by with a pig dressed in clothes for Granny's birthday. Granny wants to stay with the old truck and has it restored to the way it was. To prove how good the old truck is, Granny races Jethro in his hot rod and she wins. Of course it helped that Granny used her moonshine instead of gas.
211	13	"The Week Before Christmas"	Ralph Levy	Paul Henning & Buddy Atkinson	December 18, 1968	7–13
Jethro receives letters from both Billie Jo and Bobbie Jo. Because he fooled them into believing he is a big producer, they both fool him by agreeing to marry him. Granny gets a letter from Sam Drucker. He invites them to Hooterville for Christmas. She misunderstands other things he wrote and thinks it is a love letter. Elly's bear Fairchild eats Granny's letter before she gets to finish reading it. Now she doesn't know if Sam proposed to her or not. Meanwhile, Drysdale tells Miss Jane that the bank employees are all calling him "Scrooge". He's only going to give them half a day off for Christmas and no bonus. Jed comes by to talk to Drysdale. Granny wants to operate on Fairchild to get the letter. The employees start to protest and give Drysdale a ticking present. Jed asks Drysdale to watch Fairchild while they go to Hooterville. In Hooterville, Billie Jo and Bobbie Jo write more love letters to Jethro. Granny calls Sam and again misunderstands about a proposal. Jethro decides to stay home with Drysdale. He promised to marry both girls and doesn't want to face Bobbie Jo and Billie Jo and a breach of promise issue. Guest Stars from Petticoat Junction: Lori Saunders as Bobbie Joe, Meredith MacRae as Billie Jo, and Frank Cady as Sam Drucker
212	14	"Christmas in Hooterville"	Ralph Levy	Paul Henning & Buddy Atkinson	December 25, 1968	7–14
It is Christmas morning and Jethro finds a lot of food under the tree. The Clampetts and Miss Jane are in Hooterville to celebrate Christmas. At the bank, Homer Cratchit (Percy Helton) hands Drysdale a written request by the employees to be allowed to leave early for Christmas. Drysdale tears the request up. Miss Jane calls Drysdale and he says she's fired. To get him worked up, she tells Drysdale that Jed gave Sam Drucker a new bank and put some money in it. The bank is actually a metal box, but she doesn't tell him that. Drysdale faints and has a dream that Sam is now the President of the Commerce Bank. When he comes to, he tells the employees they can go home. Meanwhile, Eb pursues Elly and Granny wonders if Sam will propose. Mike Minor sings his single "One Day At A Time". Back at the mansion, Jethro tells Drysdale that Fairchild the bear repeatedly beat him at cards and won all the food Jethro got. Drysdale, convinced that Jed intends to move all of his money to Drucker's bank, wants to drive to Hooterville to stop him. Jethro will let Drysdale take the truck if he takes Fairchild with him. Sam talks to Elly about her marrying Eb. Granny overhears and mistakenly believes Sam wants to marry Elly. Granny dresses like a little girl to appear younger to Sam. Everyone rides aboard the Hooterville Cannonball and sings Christmas carols. Guest stars From Petticoat Junction: Edgar Buchanan as Uncle Joe Carson, Linda Henning as Betty Jo, Mike Minor as Steve Elliott, Lori Saunders as Bobbie Jo, Meredith MacRae as Billie Jo and Frank Cady as Sam Drucker; From Green Acres: Tom Lester as Eb Dawson Note: Black-and-white stock footage of the Hooterville Cannonball on it is caroling run from the Season One Petticoat Junction Christmas episode "Cannonball Christmas" was used in this otherwise color episode
213	15	"Drysdale and Friend"	Guy Scarpitta	Paul Henning & Buddy Atkinson	January 1, 1969	7–15
When the Clampetts and Miss Jane arrive home they learn from Jethro that Drysdale went to Hooterville where they were spending Christmas. Jethro says that Drysdale took Elly's bear, Fairchild, with. Jed says they never got to Hooterville. Meanwhile, Sheriff Pete Ragsdale finds Drysdale and a drunken Fairchild parked on the side of the road. The two are jailed in a little town for transporting Granny's "white lightning". Ragsdale calls the bank, but Homer Cratchit says he never heard of Drysdale. Miss Jane finds Homer and Kathy King (Stacy King) dancing in Drysdale's office. Homer tells Miss Jane about Drysdale being jailed as Jane claims that no Drysdale means that everyone is out of a job. Jed calls Sam Drucker to see if he can help Drysdale. Sam shows up at the jail, but Drysdale wants nothing to do with him. He believes Sam wants to get Jed's money for his bank. Drysdale appears before Judge Vinegar Joe Johnson (J. Pat O'Malley). The Clampetts show up to the trial, and through a few favors, they get Drysdale of the hook. However, he had accompany Judge Johnson and the Clampetts on a fishing trip where he has to clean the fish as a form of community service. Also guest-starring George Dunn as Bailiff and Hank Worden as Harry. Guest stars from Petticoat Junction: Frank Cady as Sam Drucker and Hank Patterson as Fred Ziffel
214	16	"Problem Bear"	Joseph Depew	Buddy Atkinson	January 8, 1969	7–16
Mr. Drysdale is sick and Dr. Granny springs into action and wants to bring him some of her white lightning "flu" remedy. But Elly's bear Fairchild has taken a liking to Granny's "flu" remedy and drinks most of it. Mrs. Drysdale fears that society Mrs. Van Ransonhoff (Norma Varden) will look down on her as Milburn only has the common flu and not the Hong Kong flu. Granny does bring Milburn some of her medicine and tells him to take some every hour. After she leaves, Fairchild comes into the room and drinks the medicine while Milburn is asleep. Granny checks on Milburn and thinks he drank all of the moonshine. She leaves another jug and Fairchild drinks that as well. In a daze, Milburn sees the bear. He tells Margaret about it and she is thrilled thinking he's getting sicker. Granny, Jed, Elly and Bessie check on Milburn and find the jug empty. In a daze, Milburn sees Bessie in a nurses uniform. He tells Margaret what he saw and she can't wait to brag to the Bridge Club that Milburn is hallucinating. Miss Jane comes by and Milburn tells her how Fairchild started drinking. Margaret brings Mrs. Van Ransonhoff to have Milburn tell her about his hallucinations. Mrs. Van Ransonhoff sees Fairchild and Bessie on the balcony. Granny comes by and embarrasses Margaret even more.
215	17	"Jethro the Flesh Peddler"	Joseph Depew	Story by : Buddy Atkinson & Lois Hire; Teleplay by : Buddy Atkinson, Lois Hire & Dick Wesson	January 22, 1969	7–17
Jethro's new plan is to become a big time talent agent. Jethro tells Jed and Granny that he leased the 5th floor of the Commerce Bank. Mr. Drysdale is excited about getting a big time talent agent to lease part of the bank. He gives a fancy jacket to beautiful secretary Bunny for closing the deal. Drysdale then learns that it is Jethro who's in charge of J.B. Enterprises. Cousin Roy (Roy Clark) from back home comes for a visit. He's out in Beverly Hills to make a record album but first he needs an agent. The family and Roy go to see Jethro about being Roy's agent. Jethro gives them the brush off. Drysdale tries to talk Jethro out of being an agent and that he's running up a lot of bills. Roy decides to go back home because Jethro won't represent him. Elly sweet talks Roy into staying.
216	18	"Cousin Roy in Movieland"	Joseph Depew	Dick Wesson	January 29, 1969	7–18
Roy tells Jed and Granny that the man at the record company wants to record him, but he has no money. Jed says he'll put up the money. Jed again asks Jethro to be Roy's agent, but Jethro turns him down. Mr. Drysdale is trying to figure out how he can get his rent money from client-less Jethro. Jed and Elly go to see Roy make his record. Drysdale tells Jed that with his financial backing, Jethro can make Roy the biggest thing in show business. Under threat of eviction, Jethro agrees to take on Cousin Roy as a client. But first he wants to remake the singer's image which changes everything that made the guitar player likeable. Jed and Ellie are dismayed. Roy tells Jethro that he can't perform with the new image and Jethro tears up his contract. Then they all learn that Roy's country record is a smash hit. Jethro wants Roy back.
217	19	"Jed Clampett Enterprises"	Joseph Depew	Paul Henning & Buddy Atkinson	February 5, 1969	7–19
Drysdale is still trying to get rent money from "Mr. Show Business", Jethro. Drysdale talks Jed into taking over the space and setting up Jed Clampett Enterprises. What Drysdale doesn't know is that Jed plans to sharpen tools, whittle things and have a repair shop. Granny will have a doctor and dentist office and a barber shop. Elly will be the pretty receptionist and give away animals to each customer. When Jethro hears about Jed taking over, he threatens to take his stable of stars somewhere else and Drysdale says that fine with him. Drysdale is surprised when he finds out what Jed and Granny intend to do. Elly is going to walk around outside the building and advertise JC Enterprises. Drysdale doesn't want that to happen, so he tells Jed he'll find the customers for him. Drysdale decides to have his employees get their healthcare from Granny. He tells Miss Jane to seal off the 5th floor from the public. Drysdale tells Homer Cratchit about the health care program. Elly tells Homer that Granny can make his hair grow in. Granny goes to work on Drysdale's teeth despite his objections. Guest-starring Venita Wolf as Suzy and Seamon Glass as Julie Andrews.
218	20	"The Phantom Fifth Floor"	Joseph Depew	Paul Henning & Buddy Atkinson	February 12, 1969	7–20
After Granny pulls the caps off of Drysdale's front teeth, he begins to regret that he let them take over the fifth floor. But then his greed takes over and he wants to raise Jed's rent. A building inspector named Mr. Armstrong (Herb Vigran) visits the bank to find out about the business on the fifth floor. To prevent him from going to the 5th floor, Drysdale tells him that Jethro came on hard times and jumped to his death and that the 5th floor is now vacant. Meanwhile, Jed agrees to let Jethro open his talent agency at the mansion. Jed shows Miss Jane the wooden teeth he whittled for Mr. Drysdale. Armstrong visits the fifth floor anyway. After speaking to Granny and Jed about Jethro and what the two of them are doing there, he believes it to be a place for occupational therapy. When Elly tells everyone that Jethro is coming back because there are no stars where he is, Armstrong knows the therapy is needed. Drysdale hears that Armstrong is on the fifth floor and he thinks he's in for a lot of trouble. But Armstrong comes by and congratulates him on his therapy program. Drysdale then starts bragging about the program and Granny comes by and wants to put in his wooden teeth.
219	21	"The Hired Gun"	Joseph Depew	Paul Henning & Buddy Atkinson	February 19, 1969	7–21
Granny gets Mr. Drysdale up at 5am so he can open the bank for them. Drysdale tells Miss Jane that he hired "troubleshooter" Homer Bedloe for the bank. His main mission is to get the Clampetts to close their business operating out of the 5th floor. Bedloe arrives and mentions how he worked for Drysdale's father and admired him for his meanness. When Bedloe and Drysdale see Jed coming, Drysdale pretends to be on the Clampetts' side and tells Bedloe to leave. Jed tells Drysdale that Jethro will be joining the company as a psychiatrist and fish cleaner. Homer tells Drysdale he has a plan to get rid of the Clampetts. Meanwhile, Homer Cratchit now has a full head of hair thanks to Granny. Homer and Drysdale put their plan into action. Thinking they've caused Drysdale enough trouble, Jed says they will leave. But after seeing what a good friend Drysdale was for sticking up for them, they decide to stay. Note: Charles Lane reprises his role from Petticoat Junction as Homer Bedloe.
220	22	"The Happy Bank"	Joseph Depew	Paul Henning & Buddy Atkinson	February 26, 1969	7–22
Granny provides Homer Cratchit with a baldness cure which makes the other employees curious about what's going on on the 5th floor. Mr. Drysdale is even more eager to get the Clampetts out of his building, but when he sees them, he can't bring himself to say anything. Elly brings one of her cats, Louise, that's about to have kittens. Granny has Elly register Louise as an employee of the bank and puts the cat in the maternity ward. Carol Bennett, one of the secretaries, takes an interest in Jed when she finds out how much money he has. Drysdale learns that there's someone in maternity and Granny tells him it is the bank's cleaning lady. Drysdale thinks Louise is an unwed woman. Drysdale fires Carol, but then she threatens to tell the newspapers about the cleaning lady. Drysdale thinks his father has come back as a crow. He asks his father for advice when Jethro says Louise had triplets. Miss Jane tells him Louise has had 5 babies with more on the way. Jed and Granny decide they want to close up shop and vacate the 5th floor.
221	23	"Sam Drucker's Visit"	Joseph Depew	Paul Henning & Buddy Atkinson	March 5, 1969	7–23
Sam Drucker wins a trip to Beverly Hills and Bobbie Jo sends a telegram to let the Clampetts know. Granny misunderstands the message and believes he's coming to court her. After hearing that Sam is coming for Granny, Elly starts working on her cooking skills. Jethro is afraid him and Jed will be left at the mercy of Elly's terrible cooking. Jethro hopes to sabotage this supposed romance. When Sam arrives, Jethro tells him that many handsome actors are pursuing Granny. Jethro tells Sam that even Dash Riprock is courting Granny. Sam says that Dash is too young for Granny. Jethro says that Dash is actually pushing 70 and it is make-up that makes him look young. When Drysdale hears Sam's in town, he's afraid Sam is trying to get Jed to put his money in the Hooterville bank. Drysdale begs Granny not to move to Hooterville. Jethro gets Dash Riprock to dress up like the Lone Ranger and pretend to be one of Granny's many suitors. Dash rides up to the mansion on a white horse dressed as the Lone Ranger and then takes Granny away. Jethro's plan to make Sam leave doesn't work, because Sam's enjoying the excitement. Guest stars from Petticoat Junction: Frank Cady as Sam Drucker and Lori Saunders as Bobbie Jo
222	24	"The Guru"	Joseph Depew	Buddy Atkinson & Ric Touceda	March 12, 1969	7–24
Jethro wants to be a Guru and is working on some Yoga exercises. He believes all the Hollywood actresses are attracted to Gurus. Jethro also hopes to learn from Mrs. Drysdale's Guru (William Mims). The Guru seems to have a fondness for money, alcohol and women. The Guru would like Margaret to take a pilgrimage to India. She calls Milburn, and after misunderstanding where she wants to go, he says she can go. Margaret writes the Guru a large check. After learning the Clampetts have a lot of money, the Guru goes there. The Guru was about to meditate with Jethro, but then he sees Elly in a bathing suit. The Guru tries to sell Jethro a Guru license for $5000. Granny shares some moonshine with the Guru and he proclaims her "Queen of Gurus". Mr. Drysdale, sensing the Guru is interested in the Clampetts' money, calls the police to have him arrested. When the police officer (Ray Kellogg) arrives at the Clampetts', he finds a tipsy Granny dressed as a guru and arrests her.
223	25	"The Jogging Clampetts"	Joseph Depew	Buddy Atkinson & Lou Huston	March 19, 1969	7–25
The Drysdales have taken up jogging. Margaret wants to join the local jogging club and Drysdale wants the members to put their money in his bank. Margaret is better at it than Milburn and she says she's going to beat him. Granny overhears this and sees them running. Granny thinks Margaret is trying to kill Milburn. Elly and Jethro have taken up jogging as well and Granny learns that's what the Drysdales were doing. Drysdale tells Miss Jane that he hopes to get the 30 million dollar account of Jason Detweiler (Paul Newlan), head of the jogging club. Mr. Drysdale needs a doctor's note saying he is in perfect health to be able to join Detweiler's club. Knowing that no real doctor will sign the note, Miss Jane takes him to see Dr. Granny. Granny gives Drysdale a physical examination. Despite a blood pressure issue that is caused by the thought of money, Granny passes Drysdale. Ellie and Jethro form "Jethro's Joggers". Drysdale collapses while jogging with Detweiler, so Detweiler comes back and insults Dr. Granny. Granny proceeds to outjog Detweiler. The men of the jogging club see Elly and decide to join Jethro's club.
224	26	"Collard Greens an' Fatback"	Joseph Depew	Paul Henning & Buddy Atkinson	March 26, 1969	7–26
Granny is cooking collard greens and fatback by the pool. Meanwhile, Drysdale tells Miss Jane that he's letting Margaret sell the house. He tells Miss Jane that famous singer Pat Boone is coming to look at the place. Margaret tries to get Granny to stop cooking. Manager Mr. Tucker (Tristram Coffin) brings Pat by the Drysdale mansion. Pat smells Granny's cooking and he wanders into their backyard. Pat introduces himself and tells Granny he's from Tennessee. The Clampetts befriend him, thinking he's a hill country man down on his luck. They invite him to dinner and Jed tries to give him some money. A police officer (Jack Bannon) comes by to tell Granny she can't have an open flame outside. He recognizes Pat and realizes that Jed and Granny don't know who Pat is. Pat would like to keep it that way. Jed invites the Drysdale's and Miss Jane to dinner. Afraid that Pat will be offended by the Clampetts, Margaret really drops the price of the house while talking to Mr. Tucker. Drysdale is mad when he learns Margaret sold the house for $10,000. Everyone arrives at the Clampett's, has dinner and then Pat sings for them.

=== Season 8 (1969–70) ===
No. overall	No. in season	Title	Directed by	Written by	Original release date	Prod. code
225	1	"Back to the Hills"	Bob Leeds	Paul Henning & Dick Wesson	September 24, 1969	8–1
Granny thinks a mountain lion ate Jethro in the root cellar, but it is Elly's new pet. Granny learns that Elverna Bradshaw's daughter is getting married. Granny tells Jed they have to go back to the hills to find Elly a man. Jethro says he can bring some college boys over to meet Elly. Granny tells Drysdale they're going to the hills and want to take their money as a dowry for Elly. Jethro brings three students over, but it turns out they are more college protesters than college students. Elly leaves with Mitch (Rob Reiner), one of the three, and Jethro. Drysdale tries to talk Jed out of leaving for the hills. Elly comes by dressed as a hippie and carrying a protest sign. Granny, Jed and Elly leave for the hills. Meanwhile, Jethro stays at the mansion and plans to continue his college pursuits. Also guest-starring Robert Corff as Boy Student.
226	2	"The Hills of Home"	Bob Leeds	Paul Henning & Dick Wesson	October 1, 1969	8–2
Jed, Granny, and Elly arrive in Silver Dollar City and are dropped off in front of the hotel. Old friend and blacksmith Shad (Lloyd "Shad" Heller) tells them there'll be fair starting soon. Jed and Elly go into the hotel and Shorty Kellems (Shug Fisher), who Jed hasn't seen in 25 years, is the clerk. Meanwhile back at the mansion, Drysdale is cooking for Jethro and his three protester friends and is getting tired of it. Mitch tells Drysdale that he'll get a bunch of people to picket at the bank. Drysdale says that he's one of them at heart. When Miss Jane calls, he tells her the bank is a temple of greed. Mr. Parnell (Walter Woolf King), the new president of the Bankers' Association, overhears what Drysdale said. Granny meets up with her old rival Elverna Bradshaw (Elvia Allman) and restarts their feud. Elverna makes a bet with Granny that her daughter will be married before Elly. Drysdale dresses up as a hippie to prove to Jethro and his friends that he is one of them. They agree to not picket the bank and leave. Miss Jane brings Mr. Parnell to the mansion and he sees hippie Drysdale. Granny finds a way to have Elverna instigate a fight and Granny goes chasing after her.
227	3	"Silver Dollar City Fair"	Bob Leeds	Paul Henning & Dick Wesson	October 8, 1969	8–3
Miss Jane calls Drysdale at the mansion. He tells her to get him on a plane to the hills as he has to get the Clampetts back. He's tired of cooking for Elly's critters and Jethro. Meanwhile, the Silver Dollar City Fair begins and Granny and Elverna Bradshaw's feud continues. Miss Jane tells Drysdale that the Clampetts are staying until they find Elly a husband. After she's married, the whole family might stay there. Granny wants their money sent to them. Elly has entered several contests and Jed is worried about the baking one. Granny keeps up her efforts to get Elly married, extolling her virtues to all the bachelors at the fair. Jed tries to get Granny to stop. Granny helps Chick Allen, the Herb Medicine Man, sell his products. While doing so, she promotes Elly's beauty again. Elverna tries to stop her and Granny rubs Chick's Magic Mud all over her face. Also guest-starring Slim Wilson as Square Dance Singer, Paul De Rolf as Man, and Pauline Stroud as Woman.
228	4	"Jane Finds Elly a Man"	Bob Leeds	Paul Henning & Dick Wesson	October 15, 1969	8–4
Elly enters a cake baking contest and Granny is worried that when people find out how bad it is, it will turn off potential suitors. She wants Jed to buy it before too many people see it. Meanwhile, Miss Jane and Jethro head to Silver Dollar City because Jethro is tired of eating Drysdale's cooking. Jethro is hoping to meet some girls at the fair. Miss Jane gets dressed to go bird watching in the woods. Elly tells Granny and Jed that mill owner Eck Bozeman bought her cake and wants another one. Granny and Jed go to see Eck and it turns out he's using the cake as a millstone. Miss Jane comes running back from the woods. She tells Granny and Jed that she found the perfect man for Elly while in the woods. His name is Matthew Templeton and she invited him to meet Elly. Matthew arrives and he is tall and handsome. He and Elly go sightseeing.
229	5	"Wedding Plans"	Bob Leeds	Paul Henning & Dick Wesson	October 22, 1969	8–5
Matthew and Elly are back from their walk. Granny passes off her food as cooked by Elly. Granny talks up Elly's virtues to Matthew and believes he's willing to marry her. Granny calls Mr. Drysdale and tells him that Elly's getting married and Miss Jane was the one that found the man. Drysdale is furious and says he'll fly out right away. Granny tells him to bring Jed's money. Granny rubs it in to Elverna that Elly will be married first and Granny will win the bet they have. Elverna says that her daughter's future husband, Robert Holloway, looks like Matthew. Eleverna is embarrassed when Robert shows up and is a scrawny little man. The family begins to make plans for Elly's upcoming wedding to Matthew. Jed and Granny would like to meet Matthew's family and he says they'll come by that afternoon. Drysdale arrives and learns from Shorty that the Clampetts will put their money in the bank of Bugtussle. He decides that he will buy the bank.
230	6	"Jed Buys Central Park"	Bob Leeds	Paul Henning & Dick Wesson	October 29, 1969	8–6
Elly is trying on her wedding dress. Conman Honest John Shafer (Phil Silvers) arrives in Silver Dollar City and tries to get a room at Shorty's hotel. Honest John sees Miss Jane in her bird watching outfit and thinks she's a boy scout. Jethro arrives and is thrilled to meet someone from New York. John learns from Jethro about Jed's millions and he hopes to get the Clampetts to go to New York. John meets Granny and Elly and proceeds to compliment Granny on her beauty. Later, Matthew comes by and tells Granny that his wife will be along shortly. He also mentions that he's a preacher. A surprised Granny has to tell Jed that Elly's wedding is off. Granny wants to leave right away as to avoid Elverna. Honest John tells Granny and Jed that there are a lot of eligible men in New York City. And he's willing to sell them Central Park. Honest John and the Clampetts fly to New York City. Meanwhile, Mr. Drysdale comes back to Silver Dollar City after buying the bank of Bugtussle. He learns from Shorty the Clampetts are going to buy Central Park and have left.
231	7	"The Clampetts in New York"	Bob Leeds	Paul Henning & Dick Wesson	November 5, 1969	8–7
Miss Jane and Mr. Drysdale try to get to New York as quick as they can to stop Honest John's con job. After arriving in New York, Honest John tells the Clampetts that the police might take him to their station because he "always likes to help them out". The police do take John away. The Clampetts tell their Cabbie (Dick Wesson) to take them to Central Park as they have just bought it. The police drop off John at Central Park and the police officer (John Cliff) gives him a twenty-four hour notice to leave. The Clampetts find a spot to build a cabin by a lake. They witness an old lady get robbed by two muggers. John tells them it is just a game. Honest John continues to show Jed around New York trying to "sell" him as many landmarks as possible. Jethro and then Jed come across the muggers, who soon find out how strong Jethro and Jed are. Honest John tells the Clampetts he has to leave. Miss Jane and Drysdale wind up with the same Cabbie the Clampetts had and he takes them to where he dropped off the Clampetts. Feeling guilty after the Clampetts treated him so nice, Honest John gives Jed back all the money he took from him. Also guest-starring Norm Grabowski as First Mugger.
232	8	"Manhattan Hillbillies"	Bob Leeds	Paul Henning & Dick Wesson	November 12, 1969	8–8
While searching for the Clampetts in the park, Mr. Drysdale and Miss Jane encounter the muggers. Back in the hotel, Miss Jane looks for the Clampetts with binoculars, but only finds birds she's interested in. The Clampetts settle on their new property of Central Park and Jed and Jethro start building a log cabin. Police Officer Tim O'Sullivan (Sean McClory) confronts Granny and asks about the cabin they're building. He also mentions some other laws she's breaking. When he comes to believe she and the family are Irish, he leaves her alone. Tim then meets Jed and Jethro. Tim says he'll bring by his Sergeant later to meet them. Drysdale gets into an argument with a cabbie about the amount of the fare and tip while searching for the Clampetts. Elly finds Miss Jane and brings her to Jed and Jethro. Granny looks for possums but meets the muggers instead, giving them a lesson in manners. Drysdale finally finds Miss Jane and the Clampetts. They start to feel homesick and decide to return to California. Tim brings Sgt. Patrick Muldoon (Sammy Davis Jr.) to where Jed was building the cabin. Granny left a note for him saying they went back home. As they fly over New York City, the Clampetts see that the lights are on in New York City has Honest John "arranged".
233	9	"Home Again"	Bob Leeds	Paul Henning & Dick Wesson	November 19, 1969	8–9
Back in California, Miss Jane is driving Granny and Elly home. Granny lost her glasses on the plane. She claims she doesn't need them, but in reality, she does. Back at the mansion, veterinarian Dr. Bob Graham is taking care of Elly's critters and is by the pool. Granny recalls that Drysdale said Dr. Graham would be perfect for Elly. Granny goes to the pool and mistakes a seal for the veterinarian. Granny tells Jed how ugly Bob is. The airline found Granny's glasses and Miss Jane is bringing them to her. Bob introduces Elly to his young little brother, Jimmy. Bob asks Elly to dinner and a movie and then leaves. Granny mistakes Jimmy's pet otter for him. Jed gives Granny her glasses. Granny mistakes handsome Dr. Graham for Miss Jane's boyfriend. Jethro love talks Miss Jane so Bob can be with Elly. Bob tells Miss Jane they should double date. Bob comes by for Elly and Miss Jane shows up. Jed will go out with Miss Jane because Jethro ate too much and can't get up. Also guest-starring Judith McConnell as Jeanne Leeds.
234	10	"Shorty Kellems Moves West"	Bob Leeds	Paul Henning & Dick Wesson	November 26, 1969	8–10
Shorty Kellems sells the Silver Dollar City hotel and his silver mine. He comes to Beverly Hills for a visit with his "Fortune" of $1380.00. Shorty would like to go to a wild Hollywood party but Jed doesn't know of any. Drysdale comes by to tell Jed he's now worth 90 million. Jed doesn't seem to care. Jed does mention that Shorty should put his money in Drysdale's bank. Drysdale misunderstands a conversation and mistakenly believes Shorty is wealthier than Jed and he would like to win his account. Shorty says he doesn't trust banks. Jethro tells Drysdale that Shorty would like to go to a wild Hollywood party. Drysdale says he'll put on a party at the bank for Shorty. When Shorty gets to the bank, secretary Patricia Switzer tells Shorty the party is only for depositors. Secretary Jeanne Leeds (Judith McConnell) convinces Shorty to get his money and bring it back to the bank. Drysdale sets up a "Roman Orgy" at the bank for Shorty. Mrs. Drysdale shows up and drags Milburn out of the office. Shorty thinks that Margaret is Drysdale's mother.
235	11	"Midnight Shorty"	Bob Leeds	Paul Henning & Dick Wesson	December 3, 1969	8–11
Granny is upset that Shorty has been staying out late with a bunch of girls. Drysdale finds out that Shorty only deposited $1180 in the bank. Drysdale, still believing Shorty has a lot more money, will continue his misguided campaign to win him as a depositor. Jethro asks Shorty why all the girls are after him. Gloria, Jeanne, Patricia, and Helen show up at the mansion. Drysdale told them that whoever gets Shorty to deposit the rest of his money, that girl will get a bonus. Even though Shorty is tired, the girls want to take him to Las Vegas. Afraid Shorty will lose all his money there, Drysdale installs a casino in the Clampetts' back yard. Granny wants Jed to send Shorty home before he drops. Jethro wants to join the fun with the girls, but they aren't interested in him. When Drysdale finds out Shorty isn't rich, the girls he had fawning over Shorty dump him in the pool.
236	12	"Shorty Go Home"	Bob Leeds	Paul Henning & Dick Wesson	December 10, 1969	8–12
Jethro is leading a wild life with Shorty. Granny makes Shorty do many chores around the house to encourage him to return to the hills. Shorty complains to Jed that the girls he's going out with are costing him a lot of money. Shorty wants to take his money out of Drysdale's bank. Jed calls Drysdale, who misunderstands and thinks Jed is taking his money out. Drysdale enlists the secretarial pool to persuade Jed not to. While the girls fawn all over Jed, Shorty tries to get their attention, but they're not interested in him. When they get back from the bank, Granny has more chores for Shorty. Jed tells Shorty he should marry a girl from the hills and hints that he should find a girl like his daughter Elly. This encourages Shorty to write a note asking Elly to marry him. To get Elly off the hook, Jed tells Shorty he actually slipped the note under Granny's door. Shorty leaves in a hurry.
237	13	"The Hero"	Bob Leeds	Paul Henning & Dick Wesson	December 17, 1969	8–13
Mrs. Drysdale's favorite nephew Lance "Jetstream" Bradford (Soupy Sales) is coming for a visit. He is still, after ten years, a 2nd Lieutenant in the Air Force. Some men put a large "Welcome Hero" sign over the Clampetts' door thinking it is the Drysdale mansion. Jethro believes it is for him because he thinks he saved Mrs. Drysdale's dog from a dog groomer that Mrs. Drysdale hired. She informed Drysdale about what happened to the dog groomer which led to that dog grommer blacklisting her to the other dog groomers in the city. Drysdale then tells Margaret how much he's spending to give Lance a hero's welcome at the bank. Milburn reluctantly gives Lance a job as vice president of the bank. Drysdale calls Jed and tells him to come to the bank for the reception and they think it is for Jethro. Lance arrives outside the bank and the crowds welcome him. The Clampetts pull up and bump into Lance's car causing him to fall out and hit his head. Apparently, during the hero's welcome, the bank gets robbed. Back at the Clampett mansion, Lance mentions to Jethro that Margaret is throwing a party for her hero that evening. Lance invites Elly to the party and they spend some time together by the pool. Margaret comes by and insults Elly. Granny pushes Margaret into the pool.
238	14	"Our Hero the Banker"	Bob Leeds	Paul Henning & Dick Wesson	December 24, 1969	8–14
The Clampetts are going to drop by the Drysdale home to wish Lance good luck on his first day at the bank. Granny's doesn't want to go because her feud with Mrs. Drysdale continues. At the Drysdales', the Clampetts bring Lance some gifts and Elly kisses him. Margaret starts to insult Granny and Granny hits her on the head with a flower pot. At the bank, Lance starts his interviews for his secretary. Meanwhile, Jed stops Granny from going to Margaret with a shot gun. Jethro tells Jed that he wants to impress the secretaries at the bank by wearing an Air Force General's uniform. Lance is desperate to land a new depositor for the bank. Jethro tells Lance he'll put his money in the bank if Lance hooks him up with some of the secretaries. Drysdale finds that Lance has taken over his office and wants it changed back. Lance tells Milburn he's bringing in an Air Force General's account. The only problem is the General is actually Jethro who says he'll put his whole 50-cent allowance in the bank.
239	15	"Buzz Bodine, Boy General"	Bob Leeds	Paul Henning & Dick Wesson	December 31, 1969	8–15
After getting a letter from Betty Jo and Steve Elliot with their baby, the Clampetts want to go and visit them. Jethro is still renting a general's uniform. Jethro comes to Hooterville in his uniform and on a helicopter. Sam Drucker figures out it is Jethro. Jethro hopes to have Steve give him flying lessons. Steve is nervous when a General comes to his airstrip until he realizes it is Jethro. Steve tries to explain to Jethro that he shouldn't be wearing the uniform as it is impersonating an officer. The rest of the Clampetts return to Hooterville. Sam introduces Mr. "Howard Hewes" (Guy Raymond) to the Clampetts. He owns a lot of land in Hooterville including the spot where Steve keeps his plane. Steve would like to give Jethro lessons but he doesn't believe his old plane is safe enough. Jed is thinking of buying Steve a new plane and wants to invest in Steve's business along with Howard. Jed calls Drysdale about getting some money. Drysdale believes it to be the real Howard Hughes. Drysdale, seeing dollar signs as usual, plans to leave for Hooterville right away, hoping to get Hughes to put some of his fortune in the Commerce Bank as he thinks that Howard Hewes is actually the reclusive billionaire Howard Hughes. Guest stars from Petticoat Junction: Linda Henning as Betty Jo, Mike Minor as Steve Elliott and Frank Cady as Sam Drucker
240	16	"The Clampett-Hewes Empire"	Bob Leeds	Paul Henning & Dick Wesson	January 7, 1970	8–16
Granny thinks that Howard is sweet on her until Betty Jo tells her he's married. Sam takes a picture of Jed and Howard for the paper. Meanwhile, Drysdale has written a song for Howard and intends to bring some secretaries along to sing it for him. Mr. Drysdale, Miss Jane and the three singing secretaries arrive in Hooterville. Betty Jo is surprised to see the Shady Rest full of presents that Drysdale brought with. Granny thinks they are for her and that Sam sent them. Drysdale fawns all over Howard after he meets him. Mrs. Bertha Hewes (Winifred Deforest Coffin) asks Granny and Betty Jo if they've seen Howard. Bertha thinks he's chasing after other women. Drysdale has his secretaries sing for Howard. Bertha shows up and finds the ladies cuddling up and singing to Howard. Bertha chases Howard out of the hotel. Drysdale is then greatly disappointed when he discovers Jed has gone into business with plain farmer "Howard Hewes" rather than Howard Hughes. Guest stars from Petticoat Junction: Linda Henning as Betty Jo, Mike Minor as Steve Elliott and Frank Cady as Sam Drucker
241	17	"What Happened to Shorty?"	Bob Leeds	Paul Henning & Dick Wesson	January 14, 1970	8–17
Drysdale and Miss Jane come by the mansion wanting to greet blacksmith Shad Heller when he arrives. Shad comes by where he is now the Mayor of Silver Dollar City and Miss Jane gives him the key to the city. Shad mentions to Jed that Shorty never came back home. Granny notices that things are missing from her root cellar. Jed and Shad discover that Shorty has been hiding on the property for a month, afraid to go back home. Shad tells Jed that Elverna Bradshaw bought the Silver Dollar City Hotel. Shad and Jed try to make Shorty think that Elverna won a beauty contest, in hopes he will propose marriage to her as a way to get his hotel back. Shorty does call Elverna and offers to buy the hotel back. She says he will get the hotel back when he marries her and he says no. The men convince Shorty that Elverna is beautiful and he calls her back. Elverna arrives to marry Shorty. Secretary Gloria Buckles comes by the Clampett mansion to drop off some papers and drives off with Shorty. Elverna, thinking Elly's chimp is Shorty sleeping in the back of the car, heads off to Las Vegas to get married.
242	18	"Marry Me, Shorty"	Bob Leeds	Paul Henning & Dick Wesson	January 21, 1970	8–18
Elverna discovers Elly's chimp is in the car and not Shorty. Gloria drops Shorty back at the mansion. Jed confronts Shorty about being with Gloria. Jed tells Elverna that nothing should prevent the wedding now. To stall for time, Shorty tells Elverna they'll get married once he has his bachelor party. When Elverna asks where the party will be, Shorty pretends Drysdale is giving it. Confused by Jed's phone call, Drysdale says he will give Shorty a party at the bank. Drysdale gathers the girls from the secretarial pool and tells them about the party. Drysdale steals one of the girls idea for a Harem Girl theme. Elverna finds out from Jethro about the Harem Girl party Drysdale is going to throw. When Shorty hears about the pretty girls, he's interested in the party. Shad and Jed think they should go as well to keep an eye on Shorty. Granny and Elverna decide to dress up and crash the party. Drysdale has his office decorated like a harem. Shorty arrives and is happy to see Gloria dressed as a Harem Girl. Jed and Shad arrive and the slave girl auction starts. Granny and Elverna arrive dressed up and Elverna tells Shorty they will get married Guest-starring Jean Bell as Jean Bell and Susan Harris as Harem Girl.
243	19	"Shorty Spits the Hook"	Bob Leeds	Paul Henning & Dick Wesson	January 28, 1970	8–19
Jed catches Shorty repeatedly trying to sneak out of the house during the night so as to not have to marry Elverna. Shorty dreams about his bachelor party. Jed and Shad wake Shorty up because he needs to prepare for his wedding. Meanwhile, Drysdale has cheated Miss Bell out of her bonus for coming up with the Harem Bachelor party idea. Shorty keeps stalling for time by locking himself in a bathroom. Miss Jane tells Drysdale that Jean Bell's little brother Cookie (Cookie Gilchrist) would like to meet him. Cookie turns out to be anything but little. Cookie is joined by his big brother Earl (Earl Faison), who is even bigger. Drysdale decides to pay Miss Bell her bonus. Jethro and Elly have decorated the wedding car. In order to explain the cost of the party to the bank's board, Miss Jane suggests they use some of the pictures from the Harem Party as an ad for the bank. In a last-ditch desperation attempt to avoid marrying Elverna, Shorty pretends to be addicted to gambling which he knows she's against. Drysdale wants to re-shoot some slave girl pictures with Jean. Drysdale gets himself in trouble with Miss Bell's brothers again.
244	20	"Three-Day Reprieve"	Bob Leeds	Paul Henning & Dick Wesson	February 4, 1970	8–20
Shorty continues to resist marrying Elverna and has run off again. Shad and Jed learn there is a three-day waiting period before the wedding. Jed recalls how Shorty was always into chasing beautiful women. Miss Jane tells Shad and Jed that Shorty has locked himself in the bank's secretarial pool. They get him back to the mansion, only to have Shorty sneak out again. Shorty is back at the secretarial pool, but this time he has taken Jethro with him. To track the reluctant groom, Jed has Shad put a bell on him. Miss Jane "Doctors" a photo of Elverna in a bathing suit, giving her the body of a beauty queen. Jed and Shad remember when they tried to get Shorty to believe Elverna looked like Elly. Shorty sees the picture and goes wild. He asks Elverna to go swimming. But after really seeing her in a bathing suit, Shorty runs off to the secretarial pool again. Drysdale calls the police. Jed finds a way for everyone to join Shorty and have a party.
245	21	"The Wedding"	Bob Leeds	Paul Henning & Dick Wesson	February 11, 1970	8–21
Jed and Granny are at the bank and invite Drysdale and Miss Jane to Shorty's wedding. Shorty is more desperate than ever to get out of his engagement to Elverna. To make sure Shorty gets married, Jed and Shad build a cage for Shorty. But Jethro gets outsmarted and lets Shorty go. Meanwhile, Elverna is trying to give Elly cooking lessons. Shorty heads to the bank's secretarial pool. Mr. Drysdale brings Shorty back to the mansion. While rehearsing for the wedding, a handcuffed Shorty tricks Jethro several times into letting him go. Jed goes to the bank. Shorty is caught there again, put in the cage again and Jethro is once again tricked into letting him go. Elverna and Granny learn that the three day waiting period has been revoked. They can get married right away. Shorty is caught at the bank and handcuffed to secretary Gloria. Drysdale calls Jed and says Shorty and Elverna can get married at the bank. Jed and Elverna arrive at the bank and meet Judge Marshall. It turns out the confused Judge married Shorty and Gloria.
246	22	"Annul That Marriage"	Bob Leeds	Paul Henning & Dick Wesson	February 18, 1970	8–22
Miss Jane takes the handcuffs off of Shorty and Gloria as Mr. Drysdale is unable to catch up to Judge Marshall. Elverna brings Shorty to the mansion to lock him in the cage again until the wedding can be annulled. Hoping to convince her she should annul her marriage, Jed offers Gloria a taste of country living by offering her a stay in their little cabin in back. After Jed calls Elly to get the cabin ready, Granny briefly thinks that Jed has married Gloria. Gloria sees Shorty in the cage. She tells him she's not getting an annulment and she's going to live in the country with him. Gloria is surprised when she sees the cabin, chickens and a hog. Jed tells Elly to get Gloria some farm wife clothes. While he is in the cage, Shorty kisses Elverna and gets the key out of her purse. Jethro sees this and lets it slip to Elverna that Shorty has the key. Shorty tricks Jethro again and gets out of the cage. Jethro gets Bessy the chimp to let him out of the cage. Granny tries to teach Gloria how to milk a cow. Later, Jethro sees Bessy has a banana that Elverna gave her. When he goes into the cage to get it, Bessy locks him in. After Granny has her do several more chores, Gloria decides farm life is not for her. Because the marriage license was made out for Shorty and Elverna, Shorty's marriage to Gloria is invalid.
247	23	"Hotel for Women"	Bob Leeds	Paul Henning & Dick Wesson	February 25, 1970	8–23
Elly tells Jed and Jethro that Granny didn't sleep in her room and is missing. Jed thinks he knows where she is. Granny gets Jed, Elly, and Jethro to move into the old cabin in the backyard. Shorty Kellems exploits the now-unoccupied mansion and turns it into a hotel for only women. Miss Jane tells Drysdale that the girls in the bank secretarial pool heard about an inexpensive hotel for women. They would like to go to see it. Drysdale learns the hotel is the Clampett mansion. The girls move in. Jethro doesn't know about the girls and wants to move in with Shorty. Shorty wants Granny to cook for him and Jethro, but he'll really give it to the girls. Jed comes by and wonders about all the women's clothes hanging in the kitchen. Shorty tells Jed the clothes are his. When Jethro finds out about the girls, he wants to be part of the action, but Shorty won't let him in the mansion. Jed begins to suspect something is going on. When he enters the mansion he finds Jethro trying to sneak in dressed as a girl. Jed tells Shorty he needs to move back to the hills.
248	24	"Simon Legree Drysdale"	Bob Leeds	Paul Henning & Dick Wesson	March 4, 1970	8–24
Shorty's been sent back to the hills. But the Clampetts still have all his girl boarders to deal with in the mansion. Jed recalls how when he walked in the kitchen, Shorty had a lot of girls clothes hanging on a line. When Jethro wants to keep checking on the girls, Jed locks him in the cage. Elly meets three of the girls and tells them that Granny is making breakfast. Meanwhile back at the bank, Miss Jane reminds Drysdale how he talked Jean Bell into moving into the mansion with the other girls. Jean Bell's brothers Cookie and Earl ask Drysdale why she moved out of their house. He tells them that Jean is living in luxury at the Clampett mansion and they should go and see the place. Jean learns that Drysdale gave her the day off and she volunteers to do some chores around the mansion. Jean asks Granny to teach her how to cook some of her down home dishes. Cookie and Earl arrive at the mansion and Granny shows them Jean making lye soap. Jean's brothers get the mistaken idea that Drysdale has enslaved their sister. They bring Drysdale back to the mansion and see Jean cooking. Drysdale wants to take Jean back to the bank, but she wants to stay and cook. Jean locks herself in the cage. The brothers lock Drysdale in the cage and make him swallow the keys.
249	25	"Honest John Returns"	Bob Leeds	Paul Henning & Dick Wesson	March 11, 1970	8–25
Elly and Jethro tell Jed and Granny that they saw Honest John while they were driving. They flashback to when they had to say goodbye to him while in Central Park. Honest John returns to his wife Flo (Kathleen Freeman) and confesses that he has gone straight. John flashes back to when Jed gave him money for the park. Flo convinces him he's got to get back into the "con-game" and should start with the Clampetts again. Meanwhile, Jed flashes back to when the police dropped John off at the park. Just then, Honest John shows up at the mansion. John claims he will build a giant fan to blow all the smog out of Los Angeles through the mountains. Jed has a hard time getting some money from Mr. Drysdale. Jed tells him the project is a secret, but it has to do with drilling in the San Bernardino Mountains. Drysdale thinks Jed has struck oil there. Honest John gets half a million from Jed. Each of the family thank him for what's he's going to do. Honest John tells Flo about the money and how easy it was to get. She keeps asking him where it is. He tells her he once again had a change of heart and gave it back. She starts yelling and throwing things at him as he runs out. Note: This is the first time an "edited" version of the opening credits, without the ballad, is aired. A clip of Phil Silvers appears before the titles with an announcer telling us Phil Silvers is in the episode.
250	26	"Honesty is the Best Policy"	Bob Leeds	Paul Henning & Dick Wesson	March 18, 1970	8–26
Jed and Granny continue to praise Honest John. Honest John tries to explain to Flo why he gave Jed the money back. Flo is intent on helping John regain his scheming composure. Meanwhile, Drysdale wants his real estate agent Fred Hutchins (Dave Willock) to buy up land in the mountains where he thinks Jed has found more oil. Drysdale sends Miss Jane to find out the location where Jed plans to drill. Flo and John go to the Clampetts to continue the smog removal scam. Flo goes as Honest John's Spanish mother. Miss Jane finds out from Granny that Jed is drilling to remove smog, not drilling for oil. She finds out from Jed the location. But to teach Drysdale a lesson, she won't tell him about the smog. Jed and the rest go to get the sack of money that Honest John returned. Elly tells them that Jethro took it and went to look for John. Jed says he'll go to the bank and get more. Fred tries to talk Drysdale out of buying what are just a bunch of worthless rocks. This time Jed gets 7 hundred thousand. Flo breaks into Jed's wall safe, but it is full of Granny's goat cheese and she faints. Once again Jed gives Honest John the money. But this time Flo, who has just had a lot of Granny's "medicine", makes him give it back. Drysdale finds out that he spent a fortune on useless land. Note: This is the second time an "edited" version of the opening credits, without the ballad, is aired. A clip of Phil Silvers appears before the titles with an announcer telling us Phil Silvers is in the episode.

=== Season 9 (1970–71) ===
(This season an "edited" version of the opening credits, without the ballad, is used.)

No. overall	No. in season	Title	Directed by	Written by	Original release date	Prod. code
251	1	"The Pollution Solution"	Bob Leeds	Paul Henning & Dick Wesson	September 15, 1970	9–1
Granny tells Jed that Drysdale is coming by to pick up the money that Honest John didn't take. Jed says he promised the money to Honest John. Jethro wants to think of a way to help with the smog problem. Drysdale shows up with an armored truck. Drysdale had Miss Jane dress up as a guard to take the money. Jed recognizes Miss Jane right away. Jed won't let Drysdale take the money. Miss Jane tells Jethro he must convert the gas powered car engine to something else, like steam or electricity. Drysdale tells Jed that only the President can get the right people for the smog problem. Jethro converts the truck to steam (evidently either wood-fired or coal-fired, producing thick clouds of smoke). The Clampetts decide to travel to Washington DC to give their fortune to the President to fight the smog problem. Jethro converts the truck to electricity (requiring a very, very long extension cord). Drysdale finds a way for Jed to keep the money in the bank, a least for now. The Clampetts head for Washington. Note: A young (early thirties) Rich Little impersonates President Richard M. Nixon, John Wayne, and Ed Sullivan.
252	2	"The Clampetts in Washington"	Bob Leeds	Paul Henning & Dick Wesson	September 22, 1970	9–2
The Clampetts fly to D.C. in hopes of giving the President money to fight the smog problem. Con artist Honest John Schafer (Phil Silvers) and his wife Flo (Kathleen Freeman) follow them out there. Honest John meets the Clampetts at the White House. John tells them that the President made him in charge of the committee that will fight smog. Jed writes a check for one million dollars and gives it to Schafer, who says he will give it to the President. The family says they'd like to meet the President. John tells them it will take some time to get a security clearance. He sets the family up in a hotel. Flo thinks they should take the money and run. To get even more money from Jed, Honest John plans to sell Jed the White House. John tells Granny and Jed that the President doesn't own the White House. Flo dresses like a Native American and claims to own the land that the White House is built on. After some conversation, Princess Sitting Hawk (Flo) agrees to sell the White House to Jed. The Clampetts then ask a White House Guard (Richard Erdman) if they can see the President. Thinking they are crazy, the Guard gets them into a car to be taken away.
253	3	"Jed Buys the Capitol"	Bob Leeds	Paul Henning & Dick Wesson	September 29, 1970	9–3
Jed tells Honest John that they tried to get into the White House to give the President the deed that Sitting Hawk (Flo) sold them. But instead they were taken to a psychiatric ward for evaluation. John tells them that he'll go to the White House right away and speak to the President. Again, Flo just wants to take the money and run. John wants to get more. Elly finds four kittens and names them after Presidents. Meanwhile back at the mansion, Drysdale is selling tickets to school children to see Elly's animals. Drysdale wants Miss Jane to be part of the show, but she refuses. She informs Drysdale that Jed has written two $1,000,000.00 checks. Drysdale tells her to fly to D.C. and get the Clampetts. Drysdale doesn't know it's Honest John that is again getting the money. Honest John proceeds to sell Jed the Capitol Building. At the hotel, a waiter (Cliff Norton) misunderstands things that the Clampetts say and thinks they're crazy. John sells Jed several more Washington landmarks. Once again the Clampetts tell John what a wonderful man he is and Elly names one of her kittens after him. Honest John refuses to keep the money and tears up the checks.
254	4	"Mark Templeton Arrives"	Bob Leeds	Paul Henning & Dick Wesson	October 6, 1970	9–4
Elly's bear Fairchild isn't feeling well and she wants Granny to doctor him. Rev. Matthew Templeton's lookalike brother Mark, a Navy frogman, shows up at the bank. All the secretaries are driven wild by his good looks. He asks Miss Jane if she could take him to the Clampetts. Meanwhile, Jethro eats the potus Granny made to put on Fairchild's chest. Mark meets Jed and Granny and she finds out that he is single. Once he learns that Mark went to see Elly, Drysdale tells Jed that he was the one that sent him. Mark meets Elly and they spend some time together. Mark tells her that he works under water with dolphins and whales. Jed makes Granny promise to leave the two alone. Elly explains to Granny what Mark does in the water. After something Mark says to Granny, she believes that he is half man and half frog. Mark wants to show Elly his diving suit by the swimming pool. Granny sees Mark with his diving pants and swim fins on and is even more convinced the water turns him into a man frog. Granny warns Elly that Mark is a frog man and she says she knows. Granny tries to tell what she thinks to Jed, but he thinks she's been at her moonshine.
255	5	"Don't Marry a Frogman"	Bob Leeds	Paul Henning & Dick Wesson	October 20, 1970	9–5
Ellie continues dating Mark Templeton over Granny's objections, who is convinced he is part frog. After Elly comes home from a date, she tells Jed and Granny that she's going on a picnic with Mark the next day. Granny goes outside and hears a frog. She thinks Mark is still around. The next morning, Granny goes to speak with Miss Jane. After talking to her, Granny decides to put her medical knowledge to work trying to figure out a cure for being half-frog. Elly is preparing the food for the picnic. Jed is going to keep Mark from eating his daughter's cooking, so he has Jethro get some store bought food. When Jethro gets back, Jed finds he's eaten all the food. Mark arrives and Granny gives him a potion which he reluctantly drinks. Elly and Jethro go to get some more food. Jed tells Mark and Mark says he'll meet Elly at the restaurant where she's getting the food. After Mark leaves, Granny finds a frog outside. She believes that her potion worked the wrong way and turned Mark completely into the frog. Granny hides the frog from Jed. Granny tries to give the frog a tonic to turn it back into Mark. Granny speaks with Miss Jane and somehow gets the idea that if Elly kissed the frog, it would turn Mark back. When Granny sees Mark again, she thinks her advice to Elly worked.
256	6	"Doctor, Cure My Frog"	Bob Leeds	Paul Henning & Dick Wesson	October 27, 1970	9–6
Jethro is still trying to teach Duke how to fetch. Mark is supposed to come by to see Elly. Jed wants Granny and Jethro to keep away from Mark and Elly so they can have some alone time. Jethro tries to explain to Granny about Mark being a Naval frogman. Mark arrives and Granny checks his feet to make sure they're not webbed. Granny is desperate to keep Mark from being a frog so he can eventually marry Elly. To thank Miss Jane for her help, Granny brings her a frog. That way Miss Jane can kiss it and have it change into a man for herself. Mark wants to show Elly how to scuba. Jed has a sweet heart to heart talk with Elly. Granny continues to believe that every time Mark enters the water, he turns into a frog. Mark has his full scuba outfit on and Granny panics. She is also alarmed that Elly and Jethro want to be frogmen like Mark. Miss Jane brings Elly the frog that Granny gave her. Mark tells Elly he'll get her a scuba outfit. Elly puts the frog into the pool and Granny thinks it is Mark. Believing Granny is having bad dreams about frogs, Miss Jane refers her to psychiatrist Dr. Klingner (Richard Deacon). Granny brings the frog with when she goes to see Dr. Klingner. The two have a confusing conversation about Elly and her liking her animals.
257	7	"Do You Elly Take This Frog?"	Bob Leeds	Paul Henning & Dick Wesson	November 10, 1970	9–7
Granny continues to believe that when Elly kisses the frog that is around, it turns back into Mark. Mark comes by with Elly's scuba outfit. Granny tells them to please stay out of the water. When they say they're going to the pool, Granny jumps on Mark's back. Dr. Klingner prescribed a tranquilizer for Granny and Jed makes her take it. Granny has a dream that Elly marries a giant frog in a Naval Uniform. Granny tries to stop the wedding. When Elly kisses Mark, she turns into a giant frog. Granny wakes up and again tries to keep Mark and Elly out of the water. Meanwhile, to get on Mark's good side, Drysdale pretends he was in the Navy as well. He tells Mark all the action he saw and that he even suffered a shark bite. Granny sees Mark and Elly wearing their scuba suits in the pool and thinks they're both turning into frogs. When Drysdale tries to take credit for bringing Mark and Elly together, Granny pushes him into the pool. Jed has Jethro put Granny back in her room to rest. Thinking it will cheer her up, Jethro brings Granny two frogs he found. Granny sneaks out of the house with the frogs. She visits Dr. Klingner with the two frogs and she wants him to turn them back into Mark and Elly. When Granny comes home she sees Mark and Elly and tells Miss Jane to thank Dr. Klingner. Mark tells Granny he's giving Elly another lesson in the morning and Granny jumps on his back.
258	8	"The Frog Family"	Bob Leeds	Paul Henning & Dick Wesson	November 17, 1970	9–8
Jed tells Jethro that Granny's afraid of the water. Granny remains convinced that going in the water is turning everyone into frogs. She suggests to Elly that Mark become a cowboy instead. When Elly tells her how much food is in the ocean, Granny knows why Jethro wants to be a frogman. Mark comes by and Granny mentions being a cowboy. Jed tells Granny that Jethro is in the water practicing to be a frogman. She goes to the pool and finds a frog that she believes is Jethro. Miss Jane calls Jed and tells him that Granny is there trying to get the secretaries to kiss the frog. Granny takes the frog to Dr. Klingner in the belief he is able to return frogs back into humans. She tells Dr. Klingner about Jethro's family and how she's an M.D., mountain doctor. Jethro goes to the bank to get Granny, but she already left. Miss Jane tells Jethro to get the frog from Klinger. Granny is happy when Jethro comes home. Mark offers to teach Jed how to be a frogman. Granny jumps on Jed's back to stop him from going in the water. Jed gives Granny a tranquilizer but she doesn't take it. Now Granny believes Jed has been turned into a frog and she brings him to Dr. Klingner. She tells him how Jed the frog is a millionaire and has a mansion. When Granny sees Jed back at home, she thinks Dr. Klingner worked his magic again.
259	9	"Farm in the Ocean"	Bob Leeds	Paul Henning & Dick Wesson	November 24, 1970	9–9
Mark shows Granny and the rest of the family a film about his navy job to help her understand his frogman activities. She remains unconvinced and still thinks Mark should be a cowboy. Mr. Drysdale is still trying to get on Mark's good side by pretending he was in the Navy also. He even has Miss Jane dress in a navy outfit. But when Drysdale hears from Mark that Jed wants to invest millions in underwater farms, Drysdale throws Mark out of his office. Drysdale now wants Elly to stop seeing Mark and talks to Granny about it. Jethro brings more frogs to the house. Drysdale comes by and tells Granny that Mark has everyone by the pool. Granny brings the frogs to Dr. Klingner thinking they are her family. Miss Jane explains to Dr. Klingner that Granny believes that Jed and the rest turned into frogs when they went into the water. He tells Miss Jane that his hobby is scuba diving. If Granny sees him in the water maybe her fear of the water will go away. Miss Jane brings Klingner to the mansion. He meets the family and Mark. Granny comes home and sees the family and believes Klingner cured them again. But then she thinks that Dr. Klingner has turned into a frog. She brings the frog to Klingner's wife Sharon. Granny hopes that Sharon can change him back by kissing him. Granny returns after a while and sees Klingner and knows the kiss worked.
260	10	"Shorty to the Rescue"	Bob Leeds	Paul Henning & Dick Wesson	December 1, 1970	9–10
Mark gives Elly a seal and she shows it to Jed. Jed tells Elly to not show the seal to Granny, because she'll just get upset. Granny sends for Shorty Kellems (Shug Fisher). She tells Shorty that Elly is dating a frogman and Jed wants to farm the ocean. She wants him to pretend to be Elly's boyfriend to drive Mark away. Granny tells Mark that Elly and Shorty were engaged at one time. She then says that Shorty's a killer and that Mark better be careful. Shorty meets Mark and ruins Granny's story. Meanwhile, Drysdale intends to tell Jed that oceanography is stupid. Jed comes by and Miss Jane is surprised when Drysdale agrees with Jed. Drysdale causes Miss Jane to start crying. Granny continues to tell Mark that Elly and Shorty were an item. Elly and Jed come by and Elly tells Mark she was never promised to Shorty. Jed and Mark figure out what Granny is up to. Drysdale comes by with Miss Jane gagged and in a straitjacket. Drysdale leads Jed to believe that the idea of him giving millions to the ocean project has made Miss Jane mentally unstable. So, Jed decides to not spend the money just yet in order to help Miss Jane. Granny tells Shorty to not let Mark get him into the water. Granny thinks Mark has turned Shorty into a seal and that Jed is happy about it.
261	11	"Welcome to the Family"	Bob Leeds	Paul Henning & Dick Wesson	December 8, 1970	9–11
Granny stills believes that Shorty has been changed into a seal. Granny tries to get Dr. Klingner to cure Shorty, but he is out of town. Then, after threatening Mark, she thinks he has changed Shorty back. When Shorty tells Granny that Mark is a nice guy, she gives him raw fish to eat. Miss Jane and Secretary Elizabeth Gordon inform Drysdale that they have a check for Jed for 48 million. Drysdale comes up with a sob story to get Miss Jane to leave. He then forces Elizabeth to help him prevent Jed from taking his money. Drysdale dresses as Napoleon to make Jed think taking the money has caused Drysdale to lose his mind. Jed leaves without his money. Meanwhile, Granny wants Jethro to drive her to the airport so she can fly back to the hills. But because of something Jethro says, Granny gets the idea that if Mark tastes Elly's cooking, he will leave. Shorty brings Miss Gordon to the mansion and she gives Jed the check. Drysdale finds out and is furious. Jed finds out about Granny's plan. Granny tells Elizabeth to not go into the water with Shorty. Jed forces Granny to cook the food. Granny thinks Shorty and Miss Gordon have been changed into seals. Then Drysdale shows up in his Napoleon outfit to talk to Jed. Note: Lori Saunders from Petticoat Junction appears as Elizabeth Gordon, a secretary at the Commerce Bank. Petticoat Junction was canceled the previous spring during the Rural Purge.
262	12	"The Great Revelation"	Bob Leeds	Paul Henning & Dick Wesson	December 29, 1970	9–12
Jed explains to Mark and Elly that Granny thinks Mark is half frog. Jed wants to bring Granny to the pool. She thinks they are going to drown her or change her into a water critter. Granny finally grasps that Mark is not half-frog, and wants him to date Elly again. While Jed goes to get the check he's going to give Mark, Granny hints to Mark about marriage. Mark tells Elly he is resigning his Navy commission to pursue oceanography research. Mark was going to deposit Jed's check in a special account in Drysdale's bank. But because of Drysdale's attitude, Mark will go elsewhere. When Drysdale steals from Mark the check Jed gave him, Miss Jane quits. Drysdale tries to talk Miss Jane into staying, but it doesn't work. Miss Jane says she's going to rent a cottage on the beach and watch the arrival of the Grunion. Drysdale needs Mark to stay in the Navy so he can't be treasurer of Jed's oceanography project. Drysdale goes to the mansion in Navy gear. He makes the Clampetts believe that Mark is quitting the Navy because he is a coward and afraid to fight against an imminent invasion of Grunion. Drysdale says the Grunion are a war-like people from the island of Grun. Jed decides the family should go and fight the Grunion as well.
263	13	"The Grunion Invasion"	Bob Leeds	Paul Henning & Dick Wesson	January 5, 1971	9–13
The Clampetts learn that the invaders from the island of Grun are due on the California coast. Drysdale explains to secretary Helen about his plan to keep Mark in the Navy. Miss Jane comes by the mansion and tells them that many people will be on the beach to get the grunion. She invites them to come by her cabin. Having no idea who or what the grunion are, the Clampetts head down to the beach to defend it from invasion. Miss Jane goes to the bank to bring Helen some grunion. Drysdale learns that the Clampetts are going to the beach and they'll find out what grunion really are. The family gets to the beach, build a sand wall and put up their Confederate Flag. All Jethro cares about is eating something. Granny and Jethro go to look for Miss Jane's place. Miss Jane meets up with Jed and Elly. Not knowing the Clampetts think grunion are fierce fighters, she explains that you don't shoot grunion, you catch them by hand. This confuses Jed and Elly, who thought there would be more of a fight. They believe all the surfers they see are the invaders. They also believe that the grunion are poor sailors because they keep falling off their little flat boats. Elly goes to warn Miss Jane. Elly captures one of the boy surfers. Jethro then brings a girl (Susan Bernard) back to the camp. The boy and girl both admit to being grunions after being offered something to eat.
264	14	"The Girls From Grun"	Bob Leeds	Paul Henning & Dick Wesson	January 12, 1971	9–14
Jed and Granny come to like the boy and girl that they believe to be grunions and wonder why Drysdale told them they were bad. Jethro says they are prisoners, but Jed wants to let them go. Drysdale sends secretary Helen out to find Miss Jane. He needs Miss Jane's help before the Clampetts find out he made up the story about grunion being warlike invaders. Jed tells Miss Jane that they are going back home. Helen asks Miss Jane to come back to work. Miss Jane does go to the bank, but thinks that Drysdale will never change. Drysdale promises to be a better person and not lie to the Clampetts and Miss Jane agrees to come back. When he learns from Helen that the Clampetts still believe the grunion are people, he goes back on his word to Miss Jane. Drysdale tells Jed he fought a battle on the island of Grun. Jed says that the grunion on the beach were very mild people. Drysdale said those were the deserters. Drysdale even has a man (David Moses) pose as a Navy medic who needs to take him to surgery. Jed promises not to take any money out of the bank. Jed now believes the real grunion fighters are coming that evening and he wants to go back to the beach. Miss Jane revolts and organizes the female bank employees in protest. The bank's secretaries form a union called GRUN (Girls Resist Unfair Neglect). They take their protest of Mr. Drysdale to the beach, leading the Clampetts to believe that the grunions are solely female. Jethro decides to swim to the island of Grun to see all the girls.
265	15	"The Grun Incident"	Bob Leeds	Paul Henning & Dick Wesson	January 19, 1971	9–15
The women employees at the bank continue to picket against Drysdale's unfair work practices. Miss Jane asks Drysdale to negotiate but he refuses. The Clampetts drive past the bank and see the girls. To help them out, Jed tells them they can stay at the mansion. The Clampetts are caught in the middle where Jed tries to hear both sides but Granny and Elly are sympathetic to the secretaries' plight. Jed recalls when Drysdale told Jed he fought a battle on the island of Grun. Drysdale hears of Jed's offer and that the girls threaten to tell Jed everything he has done. Drysdale tricks the girls into believing he will negotiate with them and then he locks the girls in his office. Drysdale goes to the mansion and pretends he's back from surgery. He says that Miss Jane has been brainwashed by the GRUN girls. After Granny thinks that Drysdale harmed one of the girls, she throws him to the ground. Miss Jane and Helen climb out the window and head to the mansion to tell Jed of Drysdale's lies. Granny arrives at the bank and climbs up to the window. Miss Jane and Helen arrive at the mansion. Jed tells Drysdale he wants to hear their side of the story. After Granny finds out what happened to the girls at the bank, she teaches Drysdale a lesson. Also guest-starring Foster Brooks as a man outside the bank.
266	16	"Women's Lib"	Bob Leeds	Paul Henning & Dick Wesson	January 26, 1971	9–16
Elly May and Granny join the women's liberation movement, leaving Jethro and Jed to fend for themselves. Miss Jane and the bank's secretarial staff continue to picket against Mr. Drysdale's repression. Drysdale has two guards try to remove the women, but Susie and her knowledge of karate stops them. Jethro cooks up some food but eats it all, leaving Jed with nothing. Granny and Elly are picketing in front of the mansion. Jed keeps trying to go along with the women, but Jethro keeps ruining any progress Jed makes. Drysdale brings in Banzai Sakito, the number-one karate fighter in the world, to stop the rebellion in front of the bank. Banzai demolishes Helen Thompson's car with a karate chop. After Susie's karate chops on Banzai fail to do anything, the women leave. Jed calls Drysdale and tells him about Granny and Elly picketing. Drysdale brings Banzai over to the Clampetts' to stop Granny and Elly, but Granny takes care of him. Granny and Elly decide to move in with Miss Jane. Jed begs them to take Jethro with them. Feeling disgraced, Banzai stays with Jed and Jethro.
267	17	"The Teahouse of Jed Clampett"	Bob Leeds	Paul Henning & Dick Wesson	February 2, 1971	9–17
Jed and Jethro are still fending for themselves as Granny and Elly are still at Miss Jane's place. Banzai Sakito is still feeling humiliated and is staying with Jed and Jethro. Drysdale tells them that he's going to pick up Banzai's geisha girls to help run the mansion. Meanwhile at Miss Jane's place, Elly's chimp Betsy gets Granny rolled up in the couch bed. Betsy then gets Granny stuck in the Murphy bed. Drysdale arrives with the three geisha girls. Miss Jane sneaks Elizabeth, Susie and Helen into her small studio apartment as a headquarters for their cause. Miss Jane has to keep the women's presence a secret from her landlord Foster Phinney (Charles Lane). Thinking they are types of food, Jethro asks for a karate chop and a judo roll. He winds up on the floor each time. Because of Phinney, Granny has to cook on the roof of the building. Jed is starting to enjoy being pampered by the geisha girls. Granny calls Jed and asks if he's suffering yet and is willing to concede to women's lib. Jed says he should probably suffer a few more days. Also guest-starring Miko Mayama as Miko and Sumi Haru as Girl #2. Note: Charles Lane was added to the cast to lighten the workload of Raymond Bailey, who was having a tough time dealing with Alzheimer's at this point.
268	18	"The Palace of Clampett San"	Bob Leeds	Paul Henning & Dick Wesson	February 9, 1971	9–18
Jed and Jethro continue to be pampered by the geisha girls. Drysdale would like Jed's help in getting the women to work at the bank again. Miss Jane and the women continue their crusade against male chauvinism and hiding everyone from landlord Phinney. Granny is cooking "swamp surprise" in the apartment and it smells quite bad. Phinney comes by wanting to know who's cooking and Miss Jane says it is insecticide. Miss Jane finds a way for Granny to bring the food to Jed and Jethro. Granny comes by the mansion, and seeing a resting Jed and Jethro, at first thinks they've starved to death. Jethro tells Granny that he doesn't eat "swamp surprise" anymore. Granny thinks he's delirious from hunger. Miss Jane explains to her that Jed and Jethro are living a life of leisure. The girls want to teach Jed, Jethro, and Drysdale a lesson because of their luxurious lifestyle at the mansion. They manage to get the geisha girls to join the Woman's Lib movement. Drysdale calls Miss Jane and asks if the women will come back to work, to which she responds no. Drysdale goes to the mansion. Then, Miss Jane, Granny and Susie dress up as the geishas and go to the mansion to get the men to surrender. They get Drysdale and Jethro to agree to Women's Lib. Miss Jane also manages to teach Phinney a lesson.
269	19	"Lib and Let Lib"	Bob Leeds	Paul Henning & Dick Wesson	February 16, 1971	9–19
The Clampetts have a hard time adjusting to life back together in the mansion. Jed wants to support Granny and Elly, but Jethro is still against their Women's Lib. Meanwhile, Miss Jane has the contract for the secretaries that Drysdale signed. Drysdale must also pay to have Helen Thompson's car repaired. Flashback to when Banzai destroys her car. Back to the present, Drysdale has Banzai take the contract away from Miss Jane. However, Banzai won't give the contract back to Drysdale until he flies three new girls in from Japan. Miko and the other girls joined women's lib. When Drysdale refuses, Banzai throws him through the door. Miko comes to the mansion and Jethro thinks she is in love with him. Jethro finds out differently and wants to run away from home. Miss Jane comes by the mansion and tells Elly she would like Granny to get the contract back from Banzai. At the bank, Granny throws Banzai through the door. He agrees to give Miss Jane back the contract and to fix Helen's car. Drysdale tells Helen to cancel the three Japanese girls for Banzai. Miss Jane tells Granny she talked Jethro out of running away from home. Granny actually wanted him gone until he changes his attitude about women. Miss Jane then agrees to move into the mansion and lets Jethro stay at her apartment. At the mansion, Miko is showing Elly how to pamper a man and dress like a geisha. Granny will show Miko some country customs. Banzai was going to move in with Jethro until he finds out Jethro has no money. Banzai asks Jed for help with getting Miko back. Miko comes into the room dressed as a country girl.
270	20	"Elly, the Working Girl"	Bob Leeds	Paul Henning & Dick Wesson	February 23, 1971	9–20
Miss Jane asks Elly if she would like to work at the bank. She hopes that with Elly there, Drysdale will have to abide by his contract with the secretaries. Jed and Granny think it will give Elly a chance to meet some men. Granny dresses Elly up and she arrives at the bank in a flapper girl outfit. Not recognizing her, Drysdale kicks her out of the office. After realizing what he did, Drysdale apologizes to Elly. Miss Jane drives Elly home to change. Miss Jane tells Jed that she's worried that any man that courts Elly will be looked upon as a fortune hunter. Miss Jane suggests that Elly move in with her until she can find her own place. Granny gives Elly a different flapper dress to wear. Not knowing about Elly, Drysdale forces Phinney the landlord to make things miserable for Miss Jane. Jed, Elly and Miss Jane come by the apartment and things are a mess. While there, Phinney causes problems for them. Phinney even insults Jed. Phinney tells Miss Jane that he's shutting off her heat and water. Drysdale calls Phinney and is happy with what Phinney did to Miss Jane's apartment. Jed, Granny and Jethro come back to the apartment to fix some things. Phinney winds up having the Clampetts and Miss Jane thrown in jail. Not knowing the Clampetts are in jail, Drysdale starts to celebrate what Phinney did to Miss Jane. Drysdale finds out what happened and has to straighten things out with Jed and the rest.
271	21	"Elly, the Secretary"	Bob Leeds	Paul Henning & Dick Wesson	March 2, 1971	9–21
Jethro's childhood friend Louellen Aden is coming to visit the Clampetts. They believe that she wants to marry Jethro. Jethro panics and runs away because he thinks that marrying a hillbilly girl like Louellen would damage his image as a sophisticated international playboy. Meanwhile, Miss Jane and Elly are about to go to the bank for Elly's first day. Jed calls and asks Miss Jane to pick up Louellen at the airport. Louellen arrives at the mansion and Jed and Granny have a hard time telling her Jethro jilted her. It turns out she wants to try her hand at the movies. Elly and Miss Jane get to the bank. Drysdale is nice to Miss Jane only when Elly is around. When Elly mentions that they didn't have time to eat, Drysdale takes them out for food. Jed wants to take Louellen to Drysdale, hoping he can help get her an acting job. Jethro calls the mansion and when Jed puts Louellen on the phone, he hangs up. Back at the bank, Drysdale complains to Miss Jane about how much the meals cost. Jed and Louellen arrive at the bank. Drysdale isn't in his office, so Jed goes to look for him. Drysdale at first believes Louellen is there to get a secretary job and yells at her. Once he realizes she is with Jed, he comes up with an excuse for yelling at her and he promises to get her a screen test. Drysdale tells Miss Jane that they'll film Louellen's screen test here at the bank. He wants Miss Jane to dress up like Steve McQueen.
272	22	"Love Finds Jane Hathaway"	Bob Leeds	Paul Henning & Dick Wesson	March 9, 1971	9–22
Miss Jane brings Jed a bunch of Elly's pets as they are not allowed in her apartment building. Drysdale complains to Miss Jane that Elly can't do the things she needs to as a secretary. Jed comes to the bank to deposit a large check, but he then can't find it. Granny shows up with the check. She has a long story about how she found it and it involves Elly's critters. Dick Bremerkamp (Mike Minor), a penniless actor, lives in Miss Jane's building. Mr. Phinney tells Dick he owes 3 months back rent. Dick says he's expecting some money from his grandmother. He saw Elly and asks Phinney about her. Dick learns from Phinney that the Clampetts are millionaires. Dick poses as Robert Audubon, a descendant of John James Audubon, so he can use Miss Jane to get to Elly May. Believing he is a bird lover, Miss Jane becomes infatuated with Robert. Elly and Miss Jane tell Jed and Granny about Robert. Miss Jane also wrote a poem for Robert. At the bank, Elly introduces Robert to Drysdale. Robert fools Drysdale into believing that he is a nephew of billionaire J. Paul Getty. Drysdale lets Robert take Elly to go bird watching. Robert was hoping to be alone with Elly, but then Miss Jane shows up. Note: Max Baer Jr. does not appear on this episode, addressed as Jethro still hiding from the fear of marriage plans shown in "Elly, the Secretary".
273	23	"The Clampetts Meet Robert Audubon Getty Crockett"	Bob Leeds	Paul Henning & Dick Wesson	March 16, 1971	9–23
Granny is feeding Elly's critters and Jed catches her sweet talking them. Miss Jane still thinks that Robert Audubon is interested in her. Elly brings her chimp Betsy to the bank. Drysdale sees Betsy and he gets quite upset. When he realizes she belongs to Elly, Drysdale is suddenly very nice to the chimp. Robert comes by the bank to teach Elly how to drive. Drysdale still thinks Robert is related to J. Paul Getty. The driving lesson doesn't go well. Robert spends some time talking to Elly about her family. He learns that Granny is quite fond of Davey Crockett and decides to pretend to be related to Davy to impress Granny. Phinney wants his rent money from Robert. Phinney lends Robert some money but takes his apartment key until he gets the money back. At the bank, Drysdale has Betsy washing his windows. Meanwhile, Jethro is still in hiding thinking that Louellen Aden is still around and wanting to get married. Granny leaves food for him outside the front door. Robert comes by the mansion and introduces himself as Robert A. Crockett. Robert gives Granny a raccoon skin cap that he claims belonged to Davey. Drysdale now has Betsy shining shoes. Later, Elly is sunbathing on the roof of the apartment and Robert is taking pictures of her. Miss Jane shows up in her bird watching outfit and Robert leaves. Note: Max Baer Jr. does not appear on this episode, addressed as Jethro still hiding from the fear of marriage plans shown in "Elly, the Secretary".
274	24	"Jethro Returns"	Bob Leeds	Paul Henning & Dick Wesson	March 23, 1971	9–24
Jed is mixing up a batch of mortar to patch the foundation. Granny believes that Elly and Robert A. Crockett will soon be wed. Jethro, who is still hiding from the fear of marriage plans shown in "Elly, the Secretary", comes by and takes the bucket of mortar thinking it was grits. Miss Jane is mad at Drysdale for making Elly's chimp walk around town with a wearable sandwich board advertising the bank. Officer Massey (Curt Massey, longtime music composer for the series) finds Jethro and brings him home. Jethro is all doubled up from eating the mortar. Robert gives Elly another driving lesson and it is not going well. Granny doctors Jethro back to health. When Granny mentions Elly getting married, he misunderstands and says he's leaving again fearing getting married. Robert brings another present to Granny. She brings up him marrying Elly. Turns out that Jethro didn't really leave as Robert sees him outside. Drysdale comes by and tells Robert that he has a love poem that Elly wrote to him. Actually, it was Miss Jane that wrote the poem. Drysdale gives Robert a large sum of money and tells him to take Elly to Vegas and get married. Elly tells Robert that it was Miss Jane that wrote the poem. Robert brings Elly back to the bank. Not being able to keep up with his multiple identities, he admits to everyone that he is Dick Bremerkamp, an out-of-work actor. Drysdale puts Dick to work washing windows. Note: Series finale, due to the Rural purge of 1971.

== See also ==
- List of Green Acres episodes
- List of Petticoat Junction episodes
