= List of Queen of the South episodes =

Episodes of American crime drama television series

Queen of the South is an American crime drama television series created by M.A. Fortin and Joshua John Miller. The series premiered on June 23, 2016, on USA Network and is an adaptation of the telenovela La Reina del Sur, which is also an adaptation of the novel of the same name by Spanish author Arturo Pérez-Reverte. The series centers around Teresa Mendoza (Alice Braga), a poor Mexican woman who becomes wealthy by building a vast drug empire. On October 1, 2018, it was announced that the USA Network had renewed the series for a fourth season which premiered on June 6, 2019. On August 29, 2019, the series was renewed for a fifth season. On March 8, 2021, it was announced that the fifth season was set to premiere on April 7, 2021 and would serve as the series' final season. During the course of the series, 62 episodes of Queen of the South aired, between June 23, 2016, and June 2, 2021.

== Series overview ==
Season	Episodes	Originally released	
Season	Episodes	First released	Last released
1	13	June 23, 2016	September 15, 2016
2	13	June 8, 2017	August 31, 2017
3	13	June 21, 2018	September 13, 2018
4	13	June 6, 2019	August 29, 2019
5	10	April 7, 2021	June 9, 2021

== Episodes ==
=== Season 1 (2016) ===
No. overall	No. in season	Title	Directed by	Written by	Original release date	Prod. code	U.S. viewers (millions)
1	1	"Piloto" "Pilot"	Charlotte Sieling	M.A. Fortin & Joshua John Miller	June 23, 2016	BEJ101	1.39
While working as a money changer in Sinaloa, Mexico, Teresa Mendoza falls for drug dealer Güero. His murder a year later forces Teresa and her friend Brenda to flee from Güero's former cartel. They are separated during their escape; Brenda remains in Mexico while Teresa ends up in Dallas, Texas.
2	2	"Cuarenta Minutos" "Forty Minutes"	Matthew Penn	Scott Rosenbaum	June 30, 2016	BEJ102	1.35
Teresa must prove her worth to Camila Vargas, whose sicarios rescued Teresa in Mexico but who now holds her captive in Dallas. Epifañio Vargas continues hunting for Teresa while she successfully completes a drug smuggling operation with the indispensable help of James, Camila's right-hand man. In Mexico, Brenda tries to hide from the cartel.
3	3	"Estrategia de Entrada" "Entry Strategy"	Scott Peters	Scott Rosenbaum	July 7, 2016	BEJ103	1.26
Camila tests Teresa's loyalty on a major drug operation. Camila makes a move to take over Epifañio's cartel. Teresa impresses James and Camila with skills she picked up as a money changer in Sinaloa. Brenda plots her escape from Mexico while hiding from the cartel sicarios.
4	4	"Lirio de los Valles" "Lily of the Valley"	Zetna Fuentes	Scott Rosenbaum	July 14, 2016	BEJ104	1.26
Teresa's first solo drug run turns deadly. Epifañio realizes Teresa is in Dallas with Camila. Camila tries to win over her estranged husband's associates. Brenda and Tony make an escape to Dallas.
5	5	"Un Alma. Un Mapa. Dos Futuros." "One Soul. One Map. Two Futures."	T.J. Scott	Scott Rosenbaum	July 21, 2016	BEJ105	1.22
Teresa is tasked with infiltrating a wild party at a rival drug boss' estate. After witnessing a horrific event, Teresa struggles reconciling the violence she is exposed to daily and despite James's constant support, she advances her escape plans. Needing money to survive, Brenda discovers a business opportunity right outside her hotel. In Mexico, Cesar betrays Camila, revealing Camila's operation to Epifañio.
6	6	"El Engaño Como la Regla" "Deception as the Rule"	Dave Rodriguez	Scott Rosenbaum	July 28, 2016	BEJ106	1.22
Teresa's delivery route puts her in touch with an immigration lawyer. Epifañio tips off the DEA about Camila's incoming shipment from Colombia. Caught in the DEA's trap, Teresa and James must race to escape downtown Dallas before law enforcement blockades shut down all roads. Realizing her cocaine supply is dangerously low, Camila grows desperate. Brenda's burgeoning drug enterprise creates a rift between her and her son Tony.
7	7	"El Hombre Pájaro" "The Bird Man"	David Platt	Benjamin Daniel Lobato & David Ehrman	August 4, 2016	BEJ107	1.21
Epifañio ensures his latest shipment to Camila is also intercepted by the DEA. Taking advantage of Camila's recent shortages, a rival cartel begins encroaching on Camila's territory. Teresa visits the immigration lawyer. To pay back the Colombians for their seized shipment and ensure future shipments, Camila sends James and Teresa to retrieve a stash of savings. They're attacked, but Teresa believes she knows who ordered the ambush. Brenda decides to sell more than just cocaine.
8	8	"Billete de Magia" "Magic Ticket"	David Boyd	Gregg Hurwitz	August 11, 2016	BEJ108	1.06
Out of cocaine and desperate to supply her most demanding customers, Camila attempts a risky heist. Teresa goes undercover as a hotel maid, and must make a choice that will change her forever. Brenda and her crew try making crystal meth.
9	9	"Coge Todo lo Que Puede Llevar" "Take Everything You Can Carry"	Jamie Payne	Benjamin Daniel Lobato & David Ehrman	August 18, 2016	BEJ109	1.05
Camila assures her partners and local distributors that she is back in business and done with Epifañio. A man from Florida comes to avenge his brothers' deaths, not knowing Camila is responsible. Camila orders Maria, the hotel maid, killed. Still wracked with guilt, Teresa disobeys Camila and helps Maria escape. To recover a valuable piece of evidence and potential blackmail material, Teresa travels with Maria through the tunnel to Mexico.
10	10	"Esta Cosa Que Es Nuestra" "This Thing That is Ours"	Scott Peters	Benjamin Daniel Lobato & David Ehrman	August 25, 2016	BEJ110	1.20
In Mexico, Teresa is met by Maria's irate relatives, who complicate her plans to retrieve Güero's notebook. After the failed attempt to kill Birdman, a member of the rival Jimenez cartel, Camila returns home to Mexico in order to protect her life. Epifañio vouches for Birdman's safety to protect Camila. James hunts down Teresa and ends up lying to Camila to protect Teresa. Brenda severs ties with her street dealers.
11	11	"Punto sin Retorno" "Point of No Return"	Constantine Makris	Kyle Lierman	September 1, 2016	BEJ111	1.16
Teresa returns to Texas with Güero's notebook. Despite Epifañio's previous promises to the Jimenez cartel, Camila orders Birdman killed. Brenda tries selling the notebook to Birdman; she is present when James kills Birdman but escapes unseen and unharmed. Following an entry in Güero's notebook that they believe is a cash storage location, Teresa and Brenda return to Mexico. Camila visits Don Manuel Jimenez and offers to break a Jimenez lieutenant out of jail as reparation for Birdman's death.
12	12	"Quinientos Mil" "Five Hundred Thousand"	David Rodriguez	Benjamin Daniel Lobato & David Ehrman	September 8, 2016	BEJ112	1.12
The coordinates lead Teresa and Brenda to a shocking find. Teresa and Brenda risk everything to extort money from Epifañio's men. James leads the attempt to extract a Jimenez cartel lieutenant from a DEA safe house. As the governor's election draws near and public scrutiny around Epifañio increases, Camila takes irreversible steps to overtake Epifañio's empire.
13	13	"Cicatriz" "Scar"	Matthew Penn	Scott Rosenbaum	September 15, 2016	BEJ113	1.35
Epifañio retaliates against Camila's takeover in an unexpected way. Teresa escapes Epifañio's imprisonment, killing one of Epifañio's sicarios and forcing a second sicario, Pote, to drive to El Limpiador's ranch to rescue Brenda. Pote learns about Epifañio's actions on the radio. Realizing that Teresa saved his life by taking him prisoner, Pote renounces Epifañio and swears lifelong allegiance to Teresa. Camila and James meet Teresa and Pote on El Limpiador's ranch. Hidden in nearby weeds, a DEA photographer captures images as Teresa makes an offer to Camila. In a field office, another agent receives the photographs, and asks a surprising source to identify the conversation's four participants.

=== Season 2 (2017) ===
No. overall	No. in season	Title	Directed by	Written by	Original release date	Prod. code	U.S. viewers (millions)
14	1	"El Cuerpo de Cristo" "The Body of Christ"	David Boyd	Natalie Chaidez	June 8, 2017	BEJ201	1.25
To become Camila's partner, Teresa uses the information from Güero's notebook to broker a deal with an eccentric gun smuggler. Camila struggles to rebuild her empire. Epifañio unwillingly takes on a new partner he may not be able to control.
15	2	"Dios y el Abogado" "God and the Lawyer"	Nick Gomez	Jason Ganzel	June 15, 2017	BEJ202	1.27
To get the cash necessary to restart her business, Camila sets her sights on a high-stakes cartel horse race, but old enemies threaten to tear everything apart. Teresa is torn between joy and disgust when she encounters a ghost from her past. Pote warns Teresa that Camila is using expensive gifts and high-society events to distract Teresa. The DEA attempts to force Camila's lawyer to cooperate.
16	3	"Un Pacto Con el Diablo" "A Pact With the Devil"	Eduardo Sanchez	Dailyn Rodriguez	June 22, 2017	BEJ203	1.08
A flashback reveals what happened to Güero three months prior. Teresa and James come face-to-face with a group of American border vigilantes while doing surveillance on Epifañio's drug smuggling tunnels. They take risks to support each other and end up destroying the active tunnel. Camila meets with her new lawyer. Güero escapes from DEA surveillance in order to speak with Teresa alone.
17	4	"El Beso de Judas" "The Kiss of Judas"	Ami Canaan Mann	Benjamin Daniel Lobato	June 29, 2017	BEJ204	0.90
Teresa's loyalties are tested when she and James are ordered to hunt down and kill a DEA mole. James goes into a shootout to protect Teresa risking his life for her for a second time. A wedding in Sinaloa brings together Camila, Epifañio, and Jimenez. A song reveals Epifañio's past to Isabella.
18	5	"El Nacimiento de Bolivia" "The Birth of Bolivia"	Nick Copus	Joe Loya	July 6, 2017	BEJ205	1.11
Teresa, James and Güero travel to Bolivia in search of a new cocaine supplier: the mysterious and dangerous narco-cult leader El Santo. An old flame and a soldier waging a personal vendetta complicate their hunt.
19	6	"El Camino de la Muerte" "The Road of Death"	David Boyd	Ryan O'Nan	July 13, 2017	BEJ206	1.10
Captured by narco-cult leader El Santo, Teresa embarks on a spiritual journey when she has visions about the true nature of the men in her life. The line between reality and illusion blur, with the hallucinations leading to real-world consequences.
20	7	"El Precio de la Fe" "The Price of Faith"	Joe Menendez	Jorge A. Reyes	July 20, 2017	BEJ207	1.18
With their payment deadline looming, Teresa and Camila search for a new cocaine distributor, but Epifañio threatens their plans. Epifañio becomes concerned when El Santo's symbol is found near his sleeping daughter. Camila's behavior attempts to put a wedge between Teresa and James.
21	8	"Sacar Con Sifón el Mar" "Siphon Out the Sea"	Bronwen Hughes	Tina Mabry	July 27, 2017	BEJ208	1.16
After an elusive drug distributor refuses to accept Camila's business, Camila sends Teresa, Pote, James, and Güero to Chicago to give Devon Finch's tastemaker a mind-changing sample of their coke. After capturing James, a DEA agent witnesses Cortez' brutal methods, while James being in danger makes Teresa re-evaluate her loyalties. A heated telephone disagreement between Epifañio and Camila has lasting consequences for Epifañio.
22	9	"Sólo el Amor de Una Madre" "Only the Love of A Mother"	David Rodriguez	Tina Mabry & Dailyn Rodriguez	August 3, 2017	BEJ209	1.02
Camila and Teresa meet with Devon Finch to negotiate a deal, unaware they're being followed. An uncharacteristic blunder forces Camila and Teresa to run from hit men, but the experience deepens their bond. Still shaken by his health scare, Epifañio offers Boaz a proposal during a funeral in Sinaloa.
23	10	"Que Manden los Payasos" "Send in the Clowns"	Loni Peristere	Jason Ganzel & Jorge A. Reyes	August 10, 2017	BEJ210	1.18
Epifañio plans to leave the cartel world for good, and insists on some fiery revenge as part his retirement. When Camila puts James and Teresa at odds, Teresa begins to question everything. Kelly Anne, the wife of Camila's lawyer, searches through her husband's documents for evidence to incriminate Camila, but finds something that changes Teresa's life. Battle lines are drawn and Teresa goes on the run to flee Camila.
24	11	"La Noche Oscura del Alma" "The Dark Night of the Soul"	Tina Mabry	Benjamin Daniel Lobato	August 17, 2017	BEJ211	1.24
With Teresa and Kelly Anne on the run, James is being pressured to locate them. An oversight enables Agent Loya to track down the two fugitives. After a showdown with hired guns, Teresa realizes the time for running is over.
25	12	"Todas las Horas Hieren" "All Hours Hurt"	Eduardo Sanchez	Ryan O'Nan	August 24, 2017	BEJ212	1.24
With Camila in jail, Teresa aims to take over her business. Teresa recruits a street gang to help her steal the remaining cocaine and cash that Camila has stored. Teresa makes James a partnership offer. El Santo dispatches an assassin to ensure Teresa either pays or dies. Camila's transfer to a maximum-security prison is interrupted. The sins of the father haunt Epifañio as Isabella and her friends go missing.
26	13	"La Última Hora Mata" "The Last Hour Kills"	David Boyd	Natalie Chaidez & Ryan O'Nan	August 31, 2017	BEJ213	1.33
Camila and Epifañio realize Isabela hid a clue to her whereabouts in the ransom video. Teresa gets a nasty surprise when she goes to collect Devon Finch's payment for the cocaine. James realizes Camila no longer needs him and leaves her operation. And in a dramatic final showdown between Teresa and Camila, a shocking sacrifice causes the two women to realize only one queen can reign.

=== Season 3 (2018) ===
No. overall	No. in season	Title	Directed by	Written by	Original release date	Prod. code	U.S. viewers (millions)
27	1	"La Ermitaña" "The Hermit"	David Boyd	Natalie Chaidez	June 21, 2018	BEJ301	1.24
While hiding in Malta from now-Governor Camila Vargas, Teresa has begun building a drug empire of her own in Europe. Isabella's engagement to Kique Jimenez moves forward. Teresa strikes a deal with a dangerous, but technologically advanced, money launderer.
28	2	"El Colgado" "The Hanged Man"	David Boyd	Benjamin Daniel Lobato	June 28, 2018	BEJ302	1.02
While running from the sicarios Camila sent to Malta, James reemerges and saves her life twice in one hour despite the doubts she expresses. Pote's loyalty to Teresa costs him everything he values. In Mexico, Cortez convinces Boaz Jimenez to add heroin to his cocaine shipments without Camila's knowledge, and without giving her a cut of the profits. Camila opens Casa Para Los Niños Orphanage. James asks Teresa to let him join her operation as he has reached the point when he wants to do 'business differently'. Teresa takes him in despite Pote's misgivings.
29	3	"Reina de Oros" "Queen of Gold"	David Grossman	Ryan O'Nan	July 5, 2018	BEJ303	1.02
Teresa puts her life on the line and severs her business relations in Malta to rescue a group of enslaved Russian girls.
30	4	"La Fuerza" "The Force"	Darren Grant	Mark Valadez	July 12, 2018	BEJ304	1.22
Fleeing Europe, Teresa looks to starts anew in Phoenix, Ariz where she gets set up with James's help and connections. Her first challenges involve dealing with the local narco force La Commission of cartel bosses and a corrupt local sheriff. Kelly Anne helps Teresa find suitable headquarters to start her mail order cocaine business. Boaz Jimenez makes an attempt on Camila's life.
31	5	"El Juicio" "The Judgement"	Eduardo Sanchez	Jorge A. Reyes	July 19, 2018	BEJ305	1.12
An old enemy lays siege to Teresa's new Phoenix property — a winery that serves as a front for cocaine processing — and Teresa's crew is on their own when La Commissión refuses to help. James questions Lil T's loyalty. Teresa and James open up to each other and find passion together, before Teresa's enemies catch up to her.
32	6	"Los Enamorados" "The Lovers"	Rebecca Rodriguez	Dailyn Rodriguez & Fernanda Coppel	July 26, 2018	BEJ306	1.09
Teresa is kidnapped and delivered to her enemies. She is forced to run for her life while trying to help someone from her past. Despite receiving help from her loyal crew, Teresa sustains an emotional loss.
33	7	"Reina de Espadas" "Queen of Spades"	Meera Menon	Tony Puryear	August 2, 2018	BEJ307	1.09
Still processing a deeply personal tragedy, Teresa acts crazy and it is up to James and Pote to keep her safe. She tries to convince La Comisión to honour their prior deal. Pecas continues to balance La Comisión and Camila, but a bloody message is sent to inform him his time playing both sides is running out. Kique becomes the latest pawn in Cortez's game.
34	8	"El Carro" "The Car"	Ben Hernandez Bray	Benjamin Daniel Lobato	August 9, 2018	BEJ308	1.05
Frustrated at La Commissión's multiple betrayals, Teresa makes a deal with Taza in a bold move to take over drug distribution in Phoenix. Pecas uses Lil T and Tonto to deliver a deadly reply to Teresa's previous threat. King George and Bilal realize their luck has run out. Teresa and James make serious steps in their relationship. After seeing Kique's body, Isabella joins force with Cortez.
35	9	"El Diablo" "The Devil"	Eduardo Sanchez	Story by : Dailyn Rodriguez & Mark Valadez; Teleplay by : Mark Valadez	August 16, 2018	BEJ309	1.19
Teresa uses Kelly Ann's high-society connections to contact an ambitious politician. Pote and James work to turn Bedoya of La Commissión against Pecas and the others. George tries to barter for his and Bilal's freedom, but realizes Cortez has prevented Bilal from ever being free again. Kelly Ann begins to dip into Teresa's cocaine stash. Isabella betrays Camila. Teresa and James are successful in taking over Phoenix as sole suppliers.
36	10	"La Muerte" "Death"	David Boyd	Story by : Natalie Chaidez & Ryan O'Nan; Teleplay by : Ryan O'Nan	August 23, 2018	BEJ310	1.14
After a few peaceful months running Phoenix, Teresa is intercepted by El Santo's sicario. The narco-cult leader and coke producer summons all his high-level distributors to Bolivia. A Judas is among his ranks, and El Santo will not rest until they are found and killed. Teresa risks her life to prove her loyalty, but loyalty only goes so far. El Santo's compound is bombed by Finch and the CIA and Teresa barely survives.
37	11	"Diez de Copas" "Ten of Cups"	Nick Copus	Fernanda Coppel	August 30, 2018	BEJ311	1.18
Teresa and Pote hunt for a mole inside the operation and wrongly accuse James of betrayal. They gain a valuable piece of technology in the process. With Camila on the run, flashbacks reveal how Camila and Epifañio first met. Teresa severs ties with Lil T to protect her from staying in the narco business. A terrible choice must be made as James brings damning evidence and reveals that the mole is Kelly Anne, whom Teresa holds dear. James is hurt by Teresa's suspicions and wants a break from their relationship.
38	12	"Justicia" "Justice"	Laura Belsey	Dailyn Rodriguez & Ryan O'Nan	September 6, 2018	BEJ312	1.14
With her Bolivian cocaine connection destroyed, Teresa makes a deal with her sworn enemy Camila. Cortez is targeted. Teresa works to free George from his imprisonment. Camila is trusted with a once-traitorous piece of technology, though it's uncertain if she's aware of its presence. James contemplates leaving Teresa and the business and having realized her mistakes, she begs him to stay.
39	13	"El Mundo" "The World"	Eduardo Sanchez	Natalie Chaidez & Benjamin Daniel Lobato	September 13, 2018	BEJ313	1.22
Following a surprise attack, Teresa launches a counterassault to secure her empire and eliminate her rivals once and for all. James leaves Teresa and her business as he is forced to join Devon Finch, a CIA contractor, in order to ensure the Agency stays away from Teresa's operation. The real reason for his departure remains unknown to Teresa.

=== Season 4 (2019) ===
No. overall	No. in season	Title	Directed by	Written by	Original release date	Prod. code	U.S. viewers (millions)
40	1	"Bienvenidos a Nueva Orleans" "Welcome to New Orleans"	Eduardo Sánchez	Dailyn Rodriguez	June 6, 2019	BEJ401	0.99
Teresa expands her business in NOLA and proves herself to a Cuban smuggler who can expand her distribution chain. After a 6 months' long unsuccessful search for James, Teresa starts a fling with a jazz player.
41	2	"Un Asunto De Familia" "A Family Affair"	Eduardo Sánchez	Benjamin Daniel Lobato	June 13, 2019	BEJ402	0.79
Teresa's deal with a smuggler goes sideways when a local kingpin discovers she's smuggling cocaine. A local corrupt Judge makes moves to ensure Teresa understands NOLA is his city.
42	3	"Hospitalidad Sureña" "Southern Hospitality"	Darren Grant	Mark Valadez	June 20, 2019	BEJ403	0.86
Teresa is blackmailed by the corrupt Judge. Javier murders an important man and hides his corpse with Boaz's help. Pote discovers that Kelly Anne is not dead.
43	4	"La Maldición" "The Curse"	Batán Silva	Fernanda Coppel & Jeremy Novick	June 27, 2019	BEJ404	0.83
Teresa inserts herself in a deadly turf war while Javier and Boaz continue to complicate the matter in their efforts to clean up the mess they created.
44	5	"Noche de las Chicas" "Girls' Night"	Jessica Lowrey	Tom Garrigus & Davia Carter	July 4, 2019	BEJ405	0.72
El Gordo introduces Teresa to a Russian drug queenpin Oksana Volkova in the hopes of forging a partnership that would make the trio powerful and rich. George expresses his concerns with Teresa doing business with the Russians.
45	6	"La Mujer en el Espejo" "The Woman in the Mirror"	Leon Ichaso	Jorge A. Reyes	July 11, 2019	BEJ406	0.87
Unwilling to deal with the losses of a drug war, Teresa and Dumas finally strike a truce at the expense of the Judge.
46	7	"Amores Perros" "Love's a Bitch"	Rebecca Rodriguez	Matthew J. Lieberman	July 18, 2019	BEJ407	0.94
Teresa goes on a weekend trip with the jazz player she is having an affair with and is hunted by a sicario from her previous life. She decides to end her affair as she is putting innocent lives in danger.
47	8	"Secretos y Mentiras" "Secrets and Lies"	Laura Belsey	Benjamin Daniel Lobato	July 25, 2019	BEJ408	1.03
Teresa gets threatened by an FBI informant. Javier goes to prison in an attempt to resolve the issue and fails. Teresa and Pote take swift action.
48	9	"Los Pecados de los Padres" "The Sins of the Fathers"	Steve Acevedo	Tom Garrigus	August 1, 2019	BEJ409	1.06
Teresa has issues with Tony and attempts to provide the teenager with moral support as best as she can.
49	10	"Lo Que Más Temes" "What You Fear Most"	Rebecca Rodriguez	Jorge A. Reyes & Mark Valadez	August 8, 2019	BEJ410	0.89
Teresa encounters a thief in her operation and with Kelly Anne's help the team resolves the problem.
50	11	"Mientras Dormías" "While You Were Sleeping"	Tawnia McKiernan	Fernanda Coppel	August 15, 2019	BEJ411	0.89
Teresa is unconscious after a car bomb explodes in front of her bar and kills Tony. Her closest allies butt heads and make difficult decisions without her.
51	12	"Diosa de la Guerra" "Goddess of War"	Eduardo Sánchez	Benjamin Daniel Lobato & Matthew J. Lieberman	August 22, 2019	BEJ412	1.06
Teresa looks for the culprits behind Tony’s death and takes out vengeance on El Gordo’s operation in Miami.
52	13	"Vienen Por Ti" "They Come for You"	Ben Hernandez Bray	Dailyn Rodriguez & Tom Garrigus	August 29, 2019	BEJ413	1.04
Teresa uncovers who is behind Tony's death and their real motives. She is forced to sacrifice a crucial member of her team to appease the Judge, when unexpectedly James returns to her with a gun shot wound and with a message about a kill team on her heel.

=== Season 5 (2021) ===
No. overall	No. in season	Title	Directed by	Written by	Original release date	Prod. code	U.S. viewers (millions)
53	1	"Fantasmas" "Ghosts"	Ben Hernandez Bray	Dailyn Rodriguez & Benjamin Daniel Lobato	April 7, 2021	BEJ501	0.69
Teresa realizes the sacrifices James has made for her and her business. Teresa strikes a deal with a Dominican supplier in NYC despite her being Kostya's supplier already. James is resourceful in helping George eliminate the kill team hunting Teresa.
54	2	"Me Llevo Manhattan" "I'll Take Manhattan"	Ben Hernandez Bray	Tom Garrigus	April 14, 2021	BEJ502	0.66
To avoid a turf war in NYC and still be able to secure funds for her legitimate project, Teresa brokers an agreement between the Dominicans and the Russians for the NYC coke market and makes crucial decisions about her relationship with James. Pote redeems himself and later he and Kelly Anne hunt Wheeler in an attempt to prove Judge Lafayette’s corruption.
55	3	"No Te Pierdas La Cabeza" "Don't Lose Your Head"	Eduardo Sánchez	Matthew J. Lieberman	April 21, 2021	BEJ503	0.56
Teresa is forced to betray a close associate in order to preserve the order in her empire. James is dismayed with the changes he sees. Kelly Anne and Pote discuss their fears of becoming parents.
56	4	"La Situacion" "The Situation"	Eduardo Sánchez	Olivia Cuartero-Briggs	April 28, 2021	BEJ504	0.77
Teresa takes excessive risk to eliminate a police officer under the nose of the FBI. The rift between James and her widens.
57	5	"Mas Dinero Mas Problemas" "More Money More Problems"	Ben Hernandez Bray	Joseph C. Wilson	May 5, 2021	BEJ505	0.70
Teresa and her team travel to Europe to assist Oksana and end up expanding the business. James continues to question Teresa's drive for power. Boaz and George work together in Miami to resolve business problems.
58	6	"Plata o Plomo" "Silver or Lead"	Steve Acevedo	Mark Valadez	May 12, 2021	BEJ506	0.71
Teresa expands her business in Europe, while George discovers betrayal in Miami. Kelly Anne has issues with the sellers of the waterfront property, which Teresa resolves swiftly. James reaches acceptance of the Queen Teresa has become.
59	7	"El Zorro en La Gallinera" "The Fox in Chicken Coop"	Leon Ichaso	Dailyn Rodriguez & Matthew J. Lieberman	May 19, 2021	BEJ507	0.67
Teresa holds a reception to mark the waterfront property construction. She receives news that her Colombian supplier does not want to support her European expansion. Dumas exits the narco business, while Kelly Anne gets kidnapped. James and Teresa are attacked by Boaz's men and fight them off as a team.
60	8	"Todo Lo Que Toco" "Everything I Touch"	Benjamin Daniel Lobato	Benjamin Daniel Lobato	May 26, 2021	BEJ508	0.64
Teresa understands that Boaz has declared war to her, and later finds out that a much larger conspiracy is behind his actions. Teresa's shell starts cracking as James and she contemplate exiting the narco business.
61	9	"A Prueba de Balas" "Bulletproof"	Jessica Lowrey	Tom Garrigus	June 2, 2021	BEJ509	0.79
Teresa and James become pawns in a large conspiracy and are forced to hunt a Russian diplomat for the CIA. They open up to each other and make plans for the future together. Pote and Kelly Anne have trouble adjusting to suburban life.
62	10	"El Final" "The End"	Eduardo Sánchez	Benjamin Daniel Lobato & Dailyn Rodriguez	June 9, 2021	BEJ510	0.89
The world believes that the Queen has been shot dead, while Pote and James stick to the escape plan which entails collecting fake evidence to convince Teresa's enemies of her demise. The real fate of the Queen and her family is revealed.

== Ratings ==
Queen of the South : U.S. viewers per episode (thousands)

Season	Episode number													Average
Season	1	2	3	4	5	6	7	8	9	10	11	12	13	Average
1	1390	1350	1260	1260	1220	1220	1210	1060	1050	1200	1160	1120	1350	1220
2	1250	1270	1080	900	1110	1100	1180	1160	1020	1180	1240	1240	1330	1160
3	1240	1020	1020	1220	1120	1090	1090	1050	1190	1140	1180	1140	1220	1130
4	990	790	860	830	720	870	940	1030	1060	890	890	1060	1040	920
5	690	660	560	770	700	710	670	640	790	890	–			708

Audience measurement performed by Nielsen Media Research

=== Season 1 ===
Viewership and ratings per episode of List of Queen of the South episodes
No.	Title	Air date	Rating (18–49)	Viewers (millions)
1	"Piloto"	June 23, 2016	0.5	1.39
2	"Cuarenta Minutos"	June 30, 2016	0.5	1.35
3	"Estrategia de Entrada"	July 7, 2016	0.4	1.26
4	"Lirio de los Valles"	July 14, 2016	0.4	1.26
5	"Un Alma. Un Mapa. Dos Futuros."	July 21, 2016	0.4	1.22
6	"El Engano Como la Regla"	July 28, 2016	0.4	1.22
7	"El Hombre Pajaro"	August 4, 2016	0.4	1.21
8	"Billete de Magia"	August 11, 2016	0.3	1.06
9	"Coge Todo lo Que Puede Llevar"	August 18, 2016	0.4	1.05
10	"Esta Cosa Que Es Nuestra"	August 25, 2016	0.4	1.20
11	"Punto sin Retorno"	September 1, 2016	0.3	1.16
12	"Quinientos Mil"	September 8, 2016	0.4	1.12
13	"Cicatriz"	September 15, 2016	0.4	1.35

=== Season 2 ===
Viewership and ratings per episode of List of Queen of the South episodes
No.	Title	Air date	Rating (18–49)	Viewers (millions)	DVR (18–49)	DVR viewers (millions)	Total (18–49)	Total viewers (millions)
1	"El Cuerpo de Cristo"	June 8, 2017	0.4	1.25	0.4	1.07	0.8	2.32
2	"Dios y el Abogado"	June 15, 2017	0.4	1.27	0.4	1.02	0.8	2.29
3	"Un Pacto Con el Diablo"	June 22, 2017	0.4	1.08	0.4	1.11	0.8	2.18
4	"El Beso de Judas"	June 29, 2017	0.3	0.90	—N/a	—N/a	—N/a	—N/a
5	"El Nacimiento de Bolivia"	July 6, 2017	0.4	1.11	—N/a	—N/a	—N/a	—N/a
6	"El Camino de la Muerte"	July 13, 2017	0.4	1.10	0.3	0.96	0.7	2.06
7	"El Precio de la Fe"	July 20, 2017	0.4	1.18	0.4	1.15	0.8	2.33
8	"Sacar Con Sifon el Mar"	July 27, 2017	0.4	1.16	—N/a	—N/a	—N/a	—N/a
9	"Solo el Amor de Una Madre"	August 3, 2017	0.3	1.02	0.4	1.13	0.7	2.15
10	"Que Manden los Payasos"	August 10, 2017	0.4	1.18	0.4	1.12	0.8	2.30
11	"La Noche Oscura del Alma"	August 17, 2017	0.4	1.24	0.4	1.06	0.8	2.30
12	"Todas las Horas Hieren"	August 24, 2017	0.4	1.24	0.4	1.12	0.8	2.36
13	"La Ultima Hora Mata"	August 31, 2017	0.4	1.33	0.4	1.02	0.8	2.35

=== Season 3 ===
Viewership and ratings per episode of List of Queen of the South episodes
No.	Title	Air date	Rating (18–49)	Viewers (millions)	DVR (18–49)	DVR viewers (millions)	Total (18–49)	Total viewers (millions)
1	"La Ermitana"	June 21, 2018	0.4	1.24	0.3	0.93	0.7	2.17
2	"El Colgado"	June 28, 2018	0.3	1.02	0.3	0.83	0.6	1.85 (Note: Live +7 ratings were not available, so Live +3 ratings have been used instead.)
3	"Reina de Oros"	July 5, 2018	0.3	1.02	0.2	0.69	0.5	1.71
4	"La Fuerza"	July 12, 2018	0.4	1.22	0.3	1.00	0.7	2.22
5	"EL Juicio"	July 19, 2018	0.4	1.12	0.3	0.99	0.7	2.12
6	"Los Enamorados"	July 26, 2018	0.4	1.09	0.3	—N/a	0.7	—N/a
7	"Reina de Espadas"	August 2, 2018	0.3	1.09	0.3	0.76	0.6	1.85
8	"El Carro"	August 9, 2018	0.4	1.05	0.2	0.81	0.6	1.86
9	"El Diablo"	August 16, 2018	0.4	1.19	0.4	1.06	0.8	2.25
10	"La Muerte"	August 23, 2018	0.4	1.14	0.3	0.87	0.7	2.01
11	"Diez de Copas"	August 30, 2018	0.4	1.18	0.3	0.99	0.7	2.17
12	"Justicia"	September 6, 2018	0.4	1.14	0.4	1.02	0.8	2.16
13	"El Mundo"	September 13, 2018	0.4	1.22	0.4	1.00	0.8	2.22

=== Season 4 ===
Viewership and ratings per episode of List of Queen of the South episodes
No.	Title	Air date	Rating (18–49)	Viewers (millions)	DVR (18–49)	DVR viewers (millions)	Total (18–49)	Total viewers (millions)
1	"Bienvenidos a Nueva Orleans"	June 6, 2019	0.3	0.99	0.4	1.15	0.7	2.14
2	"Un Asunto De Familia"	June 13, 2019	0.3	0.79	0.4	1.21	0.7	2.00
3	"Hospitalidad Sureña"	June 20, 2019	0.3	0.86	0.4	1.24	0.7	2.11
4	"La Maldición"	June 27, 2019	0.3	0.83	0.4	1.15	0.7	1.98
5	"Noche de las Chicas"	July 4, 2019	0.2	0.72	0.4	1.22	0.6	1.94
6	"La Mujer en el Espejo"	July 11, 2019	0.3	0.87	0.3	1.12	0.6	1.99
7	"Amores Perros"	July 18, 2019	0.3	0.94	0.4	1.20	0.7	2.14
8	"Secretos y Mentiras"	July 25, 2019	0.3	1.03	0.4	1.10	0.7	2.13
9	"Los Pecados de los Padres"	August 1, 2019	0.3	1.06	0.4	1.06	0.7	2.12
10	"Lo Que Más Temes"	August 8, 2019	0.3	0.89	0.4	1.15	0.7	2.05
11	"Mientras Dormías"	August 15, 2019	0.3	0.89	0.3	1.10	0.6	1.99
12	"Diosa de la Guerra"	August 22, 2019	0.3	1.06	0.3	0.95	0.6	2.01
13	"Vienen Por Ti"	August 29, 2019	0.3	1.04	0.4	1.04	0.7	2.08

=== Season 5 ===
Viewership and ratings per episode of List of Queen of the South episodes
No.	Title	Air date	Rating (18–49)	Viewers (millions)	DVR (18–49)	DVR viewers (millions)	Total (18–49)	Total viewers (millions)
1	"Fantasmas"	April 7, 2021	0.2	0.69	-	-	-	-
2	"Me Llevo Manhattan"	April 14, 2021	0.2	0.66	0.2	0.66	0.42	1.48
3	"No Te Pierdas La Cabeza"	April 21, 2021	0.1	0.56	0.1	0.56	0.36	1.26
4	"La Situacion"	April 28, 2021	0.2	0.77	0.2	0.77	0.45	1.56
5	"Mas Dinero Mas Problemas"	May 5, 2021	0.2	0.70	0.2	0.70	0.35	1.41
6	"Plata o Plomo"	May 12, 2021	0.2	0.71	0.2	0.71	0.40	1.41
7	"El Zorro en La Gallinera"	May 19, 2021	0.2	0.67	-	-	-	-
8	"Todo Lo Que Toco"	May 26, 2021	0.2	0.64	0.2	0.64	0.41	1.46
9	"A Prueba de Balas"	June 2, 2021	0.2	0.79	0.2	0.79	0.39	1.69
10	"El Final"	June 9, 2021	0.2	0.89	0.2	0.89	0.52	1.90
