= La Reina del Sur =

La Reina del Sur may refer to:

- La reina del sur, a 2002 novel by Arturo Pérez-Reverte
  - La Reina del Sur (TV series), an adaptation of the novel for television
- La Reina del Sur (album), a 2002 album by Los Tigres del Norte
