= List of La Reina del Sur episodes =

La Reina del Sur, is a Spanish-language telenovela based on a novel of the same name by Spanish author Arturo Pérez-Reverte. The series follows Teresa Mendoza's (Kate del Castillo) life in drug trafficking. The series premiered on 28 February 2011, on Telemundo.

In July 2020, Telemundo renewed the series for a third season, which is set to premiere on 18 October 2022.

As of 16 January 2023, 183 episodes of La Reina del Sur have aired, concluding the third season.

== Series overview ==
Season	Episodes	Originally released	
Season	Episodes	First released	Last released
1	63	28 February 2011	30 May 2011
2	60	22 April 2019	29 July 2019
Special	12	27 April 2019	26 July 2019
3	60	18 October 2022	16 January 2023

== Episode list ==
=== Season 1 (2011) ===
No. overall	No. in season	Title	Original release date
1	1	"Correr para vivir"	28 February 2011
2	2	"Vía de escape"	1 March 2011
3	3	"Detener inocentes"	2 March 2011
4	4	"Juego de suerte"	3 March 2011
5	5	"Vendida por droga"	4 March 2011
6	6	"Honor herido"	7 March 2011
7	7	"Venganza Mexicana"	8 March 2011
8	8	"Escapar del destino"	9 March 2011
9	9	"Deseo Gallego"	10 March 2011
10	10	"Pesadilla de tráfico"	11 March 2011
11	11	"Jugar con la vida"	14 March 2011
12	12	"Matar por amor"	15 March 2011
13	13	"Sacrificio de amor"	16 March 2011
14	14	"Carrera de Hachís"	17 March 2011
15	15	"Víctima de tortura"	18 March 2011
16	16	"Amor a la Mexicana"	21 March 2011
17	17	"Misión cumplida"	22 March 2011
18	18	"Amar con locura"	23 March 2011
19	19	"Amor mortal"	24 March 2011
20	20	"Pelea de Sudacas"	25 March 2011
21	21	"Objeto de deseo"	28 March 2011
22	22	"Mala suerte"	29 March 2011
23	23	"Libertad peligrosa"	30 March 2011
24	24	"Tesoro de mafia"	31 March 2011
25	25	"Apuesta rusa"	1 April 2011
26	26	"Tráfico de influencias"	4 April 2011
27	27	"Enemiga mortal"	5 April 2011
28	28	"Camino de ceniza"	6 April 2011
29	29	"Víctima de su juego"	7 April 2011
30	30	"Muerte por amor"	8 April 2011
31	31	"Culpable de masacre"	11 April 2011
32	32	"Pistas señaladas"	12 April 2011
33	33	"Escape de suerte"	13 April 2011
34	34	"Mexicanos a la brasa"	14 April 2011
35	35	"Morir o vivir"	15 April 2011
36	36	"Pacto de muerte"	18 April 2011
37	37	"Salvar reinas"	19 April 2011
38	38	"Guerra de Reina"	20 April 2011
39	39	"Atracción desmedida"	21 April 2011
40	40	"Vida doble"	25 April 2011
41	41	"Seducción mortal"	26 April 2011
42	42	"Ajustar cuentas"	27 April 2011
43	43	"Alianza sangrienta"	2 May 2011
44	44	"Venganza de Reina"	3 May 2011
45	45	"Enemigos cercanos"	4 May 2011
46	46	"Celebrar divorcios"	5 May 2011
47	47	"Marcar territorio"	6 May 2011
48	48	"Despedida suicida"	9 May 2011
49	49	"Primera plana"	10 May 2011
50	50	"Deseos de traición"	11 May 2011
51	51	"Sin salida"	12 May 2011
52	52	"Amor ciego"	13 May 2011
53	53	"Engaño fatal"	16 May 2011
54	54	"Abismo extremo"	17 May 2011
55	55	"Víctima mortal"	18 May 2011
56	56	"Amor suicida"	19 May 2011
57	57	"Arma blanca"	20 May 2011
58	58	"Traición certera"	23 May 2011
59	59	"Juego de estafa"	24 May 2011
60	60	"Estafa mortal"	25 May 2011
61	61	"Escape y amenaza"	26 May 2011
62	62	"Última huida"	27 May 2011
63	63	"Final impactante"	30 May 2011

=== Season 2 (2019) ===
No. overall	No. in season	Title	Original release date	Viewers (millions)
64	1	"El regreso de la Reina"	22 April 2019	2.36
65	2	"Cuando es mala es mucho mejor"	23 April 2019	2.09
66	3	"Canta y no llores"	24 April 2019	2.26
67	4	"De regreso a España"	26 April 2019	1.84
68	5	"La hora de los Pernas"	29 April 2019	2.21
69	6	"Las matadoras al ruedo"	30 April 2019	2.07
70	7	"Al fin Moscú"	1 May 2019	2.04
71	8	"Por un huevo de Fabergé"	2 May 2019	2.02
72	9	"Señor presidente"	3 May 2019	1.87
73	10	"Adiós Moscú"	6 May 2019	1.95
74	11	"Bienvenida a Ucrania"	7 May 2019	1.87
75	12	"La videollamada"	8 May 2019	1.90
76	13	"Las sospechas"	9 May 2019	1.80
77	14	"Las hijas de Aljarafe"	10 May 2019	1.87
78	15	"El primer beso"	13 May 2019	1.66
79	16	"Prueba positiva"	14 May 2019	1.87
80	17	"Corre Sofía, corre"	15 May 2019	1.83
81	18	"Operación Conejo"	16 May 2019	1.87
82	19	"Teresa al descubierto"	17 May 2019	1.56
83	20	"Hija de tigra, pintita"	20 May 2019	1.82
84	21	"Tan cerca y tan lejos"	21 May 2019	1.82
85	22	"La caceria del lobo"	22 May 2019	1.92
86	23	"Sexo ancestral"	23 May 2019	1.76
87	24	"El amor es ciego"	24 May 2019	1.63
88	25	"Veinte años no es nada"	27 May 2019	1.77
89	26	"El encuentro"	28 May 2019	1.85
90	27	"Operación Caballo de Troya"	29 May 2019	1.92
91	28	"Un par de ovarios"	30 May 2019	1.82
92	29	"La declaración"	31 May 2019	1.62
93	30	"Te espero Siso Pernas"	3 June 2019	1.92
94	31	"La trampa"	4 June 2019	2.02
95	32	"Hasta nunca"	5 June 2019	1.78
96	33	"El principio del fin"	6 June 2019	1.85
97	34	"Somos socios"	7 June 2019	1.65
98	35	"La amiga de Sofía"	10 June 2019	1.90
99	36	"Contra el suelo"	11 June 2019	1.93
100	37	"Como en los viejos tiempos"	12 June 2019	1.80
101	38	"Los celos"	13 June 2019	1.78
102	39	"En la tierra de Corleone"	17 June 2019	1.67
103	40	"La voluntad de Dios"	20 June 2019	1.82
104	41	"La doña en México"	21 June 2019	1.70
105	42	"El corazón de la Reina"	24 June 2019	1.81
106	43	"La mano derecha del Zurdo"	25 June 2019	1.77
107	44	"La propuesta del amor"	28 June 2019	1.48
108	45	"La mentira de Teresa"	8 July 2019	1.73
109	46	"La caída del Zurdo"	9 July 2019	1.88
110	47	"Todos tras Sofía"	10 July 2019	2.10
111	48	"Mamma, soy yo, Sofía"	11 July 2019	2.10
112	49	"Amor y odio"	12 July 2019	1.78
113	50	"Adiós Sofía"	15 July 2019	1.96
114	51	"El dolor de madre"	16 July 2019	2.09
115	52	"Entrégame a Manuela"	17 July 2019	1.98
116	53	"A los pies de Abraham Lincoln"	18 July 2019	1.89
117	54	"Liberen a Lupo"	19 July 2019	1.74
118	55	"El títere de la DEA"	22 July 2019	1.91
119	56	"La ira del Zurdo"	23 July 2019	2.10
120	57	"El atentado"	24 July 2019	2.00
121	58	"Tic tac, tic tac"	25 July 2019	1.93
122	59	"Morder el anzuelo"	26 July 2019	1.87
123	60	"Hasta el fin del mundo"	29 July 2019	2.23

=== Season 3 (2022–23) ===
No. overall	No. in season	Title	Original release date	Viewers (millions)
124	1	"Morir para vivir"	18 October 2022	1.21
125	2	"Bye, Bye gringos"	19 October 2022	1.45
126	3	"El trato"	20 October 2022	1.29
127	4	"Volverte a ver"	21 October 2022	1.01
128	5	"La bienvenida"	24 October 2022	1.18
129	6	"Dime quién eres"	25 October 2022	1.06
130	7	"Desaparecida"	26 October 2022	1.09
131	8	"Cholitas en acción"	27 October 2022	1.28
132	9	"Error de principiante"	28 October 2022	0.99
133	10	"Rumbo a Potosí"	31 October 2022	0.85
134	11	"El Tio"	1 November 2022	0.97
135	12	"El negocio"	2 November 2022	0.93
136	13	"Going to London"	3 November 2022	0.91
137	14	"La traición"	4 November 2022	0.76
138	15	"Bad Luck"	7 November 2022	0.79
139	16	"Un viejo conocido"	9 November 2022	0.88
140	17	"A salvo"	10 November 2022	0.82
141	18	"El hombre del que me enamoré"	11 November 2022	0.88
142	19	"Adiós, Baronesa"	14 November 2022	0.78
143	20	"La caleta"	15 November 2022	0.93
144	21	"Que esperen los demás"	16 November 2022	0.86
145	22	"El jinete negro"	17 November 2022	0.78
146	23	"Para quién trabajas"	18 November 2022	0.88
147	24	"Asunto de vida o muerte"	21 November 2022	0.82
148	25	"Que en paz descanse"	22 November 2022	0.91
149	26	"Venimos por ustedes"	23 November 2022	1.06
150	27	"De mujer a mujer"	28 November 2022	0.93
151	28	"Peor que antes"	29 November 2022	0.93
152	29	"Esconderse no es una opción"	30 November 2022	1.00
153	30	"Dos equipos"	1 December 2022	0.93
154	31	"Un negocio como cualquier otro"	2 December 2022	0.88
155	32	"La mejor defensa es el ataque"	5 December 2022	0.90
156	33	"Favor con favor se paga"	6 December 2022	0.96
157	34	"Un juego de probabilidades"	7 December 2022	0.83
158	35	"Que gane el mejor"	8 December 2022	0.81
159	36	"Hombre es hombre"	9 December 2022	0.84
160	37	"Zombi"	12 December 2022	0.89
161	38	"La cita"	13 December 2022	0.95
162	39	"Que pidan lo que quieran"	14 December 2022	0.81
163	40	"La regresión"	15 December 2022	0.83
164	41	"Tú no eres capaz"	16 December 2022	0.78
165	42	"La hora gris"	19 December 2022	1.00
166	43	"Me la vas a pagar"	20 December 2022	0.80
167	44	"El intercambio"	21 December 2022	0.85
168	45	"Función a las siete"	22 December 2022	0.92
169	46	"Un poco de cultura"	26 December 2022	0.79
170	47	"Apocalipsis"	27 December 2022	0.80
171	48	"Pisándole los talones"	28 December 2022	0.85
172	49	"Hola Higgins"	29 December 2022	0.88
173	50	"La voy a extrañar"	2 January 2023	0.86
174	51	"Invencible"	3 January 2023	0.89
175	52	"Hermanos del alma"	4 January 2023	0.87
176	53	"Un rayo de luz"	5 January 2023	0.92
177	54	"Senador García"	6 January 2023	0.83
178	55	"Una celebridad"	9 January 2023	0.96
179	56	"Sálvenlo"	10 January 2023	0.87
180	57	"El peor error"	11 January 2023	0.92
181	58	"Él es Uriel"	12 January 2023	0.92
182	59	"El informante"	13 January 2023	0.96
183	60	"A hierro matas, a hierro mueres"	16 January 2023	1.10

== Special ==
=== La Reina del Sur, de película (2019) ===
No.	Title	Original release date	Length (minutes)
1	"Película 1: Furia de la Reina"	27 April 2019	TBA
Teresa Mendoza reappears nine years later and she takes out her claws. They have touched him what he most wants, his daughter Sofia. Epifanio is the brain of the operation against the Mexican.
2	"Película 2: La trampa"	4 May 2019	TBA
The enemies of Teresa cornered her and she did not have much time to escape. She seeks help from one of his great allies, not knowing that someone is following in his footsteps.
3	"Película 3: Mensaje en clave"	11 May 2019	TBA
Sofia convinces the Batman and communicates with her mother by video call. Teresa knows that behind the drawings she sees of her daughter, there hides the secret of who keeps her kidnapped.
4	"Película 4: Besar al enemigo"	18 May 2019	TBA
5	"Película 5: Rescate en riesgo"	5 July 2019	TBA
6	"Película 6: La aguafiestas"	5 July 2019	TBA
7	"Película 7: Jugada maestra"	5 July 2019	TBA
8	"Película 8: Negocio del siglo"	6 July 2019	TBA
9	"Película 9: Jaque a la Reina"	7 July 2019	TBA
10	"Película 10: La mentira"	12 July 2019	TBA
11	"Película 11: Amor y odio"	19 July 2019	TBA
12	"Película 12: El plan oculto"	26 July 2019	TBA
