= Cristina Urgel =

Spanish actress

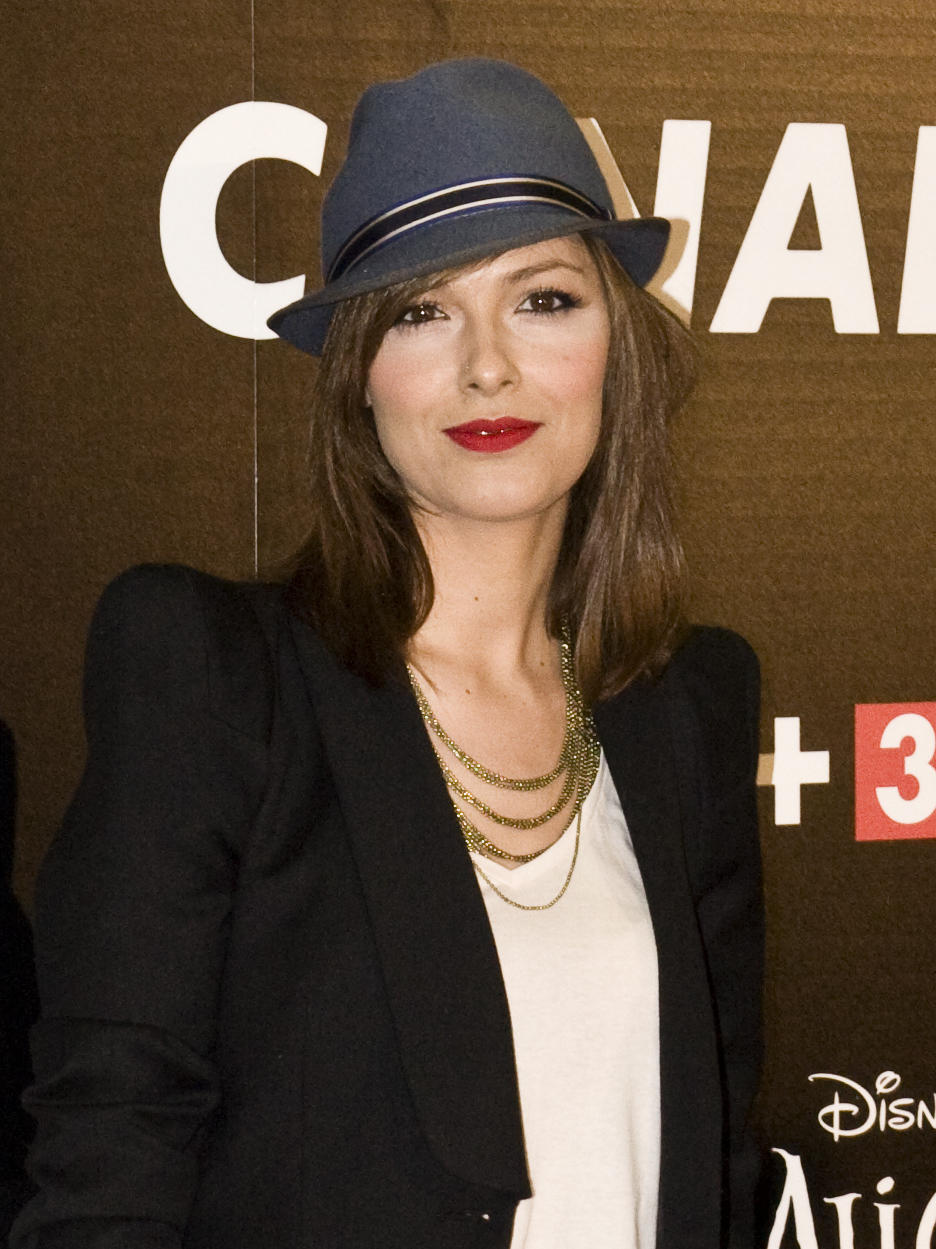
- (2010)
- Born: April 5, 1979 (age 47); Soria, Spain
- Education: University of La Rioja
- Occupations: Actress, TV presenter, reporter

Cristina Urgel García (born 5 April 1979) is a Spanish television actress and presenter, known for her role as Patricia O’Farrell in La Reina del Sur.

== Biography ==
Cristina Urgel García was born on 5 April 1979 in Soria, although she was raised in Logroño (in the neighbouring region of La Rioja), studying at the IES Mateo Sagasta. She ran as candidate of Soria at Miss Spain 1997, when she was 17 years old. She earned a licentiate degree in Law from the University of La Rioja and then moved to Madrid to train as actress at the Alicia Hermida's La Barraca School.

She played secondary or supporting roles in series such as El comisario or Ana y los 7, starring as main cast in El auténtico Rodrigo Leal, the Spanish remake of the namesake Colombian telenovela.

She also worked as TV presenter for MTV Spain (2004 and 2005), El Grand Prix del verano (2005), Adivina quién viene a cenar, and as collaborator for La Sexta's Sé lo que hicisteis... (2009) and Cuatro's Vaya tropa (2009–2010).

In 2011 she starred in La Reina del Sur playing Patricia O'Farrell, an aristocratic, cultured, educated and bisexual woman friend of the leading character Teresa Mendoza. She also appeared in Bandolera and Ciega a citas. After playing a small role in two episodes of La que se avecina in 2014, Urgel took some years off from acting. She briefly worked as collaborator of Amigas y conocidas and the comedy show Dani&Flo (2017).

She returned to fiction in 2020, as she joined the cast of El secreto de Puente Viejo.

== Filmography ==
Television

Year	Title	Role	Notes	Ref
2005	El auténtico Rodrigo Leal	Carmen Morena		
2006	La dársena de poniente	Carla		
2011	La Reina del Sur	Patricia O’Farrell		
2012	Bandolera	Eva		
2020	El secreto de Puente Viejo	Estefanía		
