= Susan Bernard =

American actress (1948–2019)

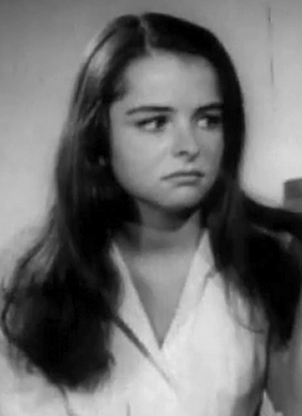
- Susan Bernard in Faster, Pussycat! Kill! Kill!
- Born: Susan Lynn Bernard; February 11, 1948; Los Angeles, California, U.S.
- Died: June 21, 2019 (aged 71); Los Angeles, California, U.S.
- Occupations: Author, businesswoman, actress, model
- Spouse: Jason Miller (m. 1974; div. 1983)
- Children: Joshua John Miller
- Website: bernardofhollywood.com

Susan Lynn Bernard (February 11, 1948 – June 21, 2019) was an American author, actress, model and businesswoman from Los Angeles, California. She was the daughter of photographer Bruno Bernard.

== Career ==
Susan Bernard was the author of six books, including Marilyn: Intimate Exposures, Bernard of Hollywood's Ultimate Pin-Up Book and Joyous Motherhood. She was the president of Bernard of Hollywood/Renaissance Road Incorporated.

Bernard starred in the Russ Meyer film Faster, Pussycat! Kill! Kill! in 1965, and in two seasons of General Hospital in the late 1960s.

She appeared in Playboy in December 1966, and was believed to be the first Jewish Playmate of the month, though in recent years Cindy Fuller, Miss May 1959, has claimed that she was the first Jewish Playmate.

In an interview in the August 1998 issue of Femme Fatales, Bernard revealed, "I was the first under-18 Jewish virgin who was in the centerfold placed in front of a Christmas tree," and that she'd never been nude in front of anyone other than her mother prior to posing for Mario Casilli, who had been one of her father's apprentices.

== Personal life and death ==
Her father was photographer Bruno Bernard. Her husband, although they later divorced, was actor/playwright Jason Miller; their son is actor Joshua John Miller.

She died of an apparent heart attack on June 21, 2019.

== Bibliography ==
- Bernard, Susan (2011). Marilyn: Intimate Exposures. Sterling Signature.
- Bernard, Susan (2002). Bernard of Hollywood: The Ultimate Pin-Up Book. Taschen.

== Filmography ==
=== Films ===
- The Mao Game (1999)
- Teenager (1974)
- The Killing Kind (1973) .... Tina Moore (as Sue Bernard)
- Necromancy (1972) .... Nancy
- Machismo: 40 Graves for 40 Guns (1971) .... Julie
- The Phynx (1970) .... London Belly
- That Tender Touch (1969) .... Terry Manning
- The Witchmaker (1969) .... Felicity Johnson
- Stranger In Hollywood (1968) .... Woman
- Faster, Pussycat! Kill! Kill! (1965) .... Linda

=== Television ===
- The Smith Family - "No Place to Hide" (1971)
- The Beverly Hillbillies
  - "The Girls from Grun" (1971) .... Girl
  - "The Grunion Invasion" (1971) .... Girl
- Room 222 - "Funny Boy" (1969) .... Joellen
- General Hospital (1963) .... Beverly Cleveland Fairchild (1968–1969)

== See also ==
- List of people in Playboy 1960–1969

Judy Tyler	Melinda Windsor	Priscilla Wright	Karla Conway	Dolly Read	Kelly Burke
Tish Howard	Susan Denberg	Dianne Chandler	Linda Moon	Lisa Baker	Susan Bernard
