= Bruno Bernard =

German-American photographer (1912–1987)

- Born: February 2, 1912; Berlin, Germany
- Died: June 3, 1987 (aged 75); Malibu, California, U.S.
- Occupation: Photographer
- Children: Susan Bernard
- Relatives: Joshua John Miller (grandson)

Bruno Bernard Sommerfeld (February 2, 1912 – June 3, 1987), also known as Bernard of Hollywood, was an American photographer best known for pin-up and glamour photography of Marilyn Monroe and others.

== Early life ==
Bruno Bernard Sommerfeld was born into poverty on February 2, 1912, in Berlin, Germany. He was put in an orphanage by parents who could not afford to support him. In 1923, his parents gave him a Rolleiflex camera, which led to a lifelong interest in photography.

He attended Kiel University, where, in 1934, he earned a doctorate in criminal psychology. He became the general secretary of a Jewish youth organization, which led to his name appearing on a Gestapo hit list. In 1937, he fled to America from Nazi Germany, claiming to German authorities that he was leaving the country to continue his graduate studies. He attended the University of California, Berkeley, where he planned to continue his education but soon became interested in the arts. In 1940, he became a directorial apprentice at the Reinhardt School of the Theatre, opened by Max Reinhardt on Sunset Boulevard in Los Angeles.

== Career in Hollywood ==
Unable to get a job as a director, Bernard returned to his interest in photography. In 1938 he set up a darkroom in the basement of his Los Angeles apartment. Inspired by his background in psychology, what he learned about directing, and collaboration with Alberto Vargas, Bernard developed a unique portrait style that he called the "posed candid"; a style that evolved into what is now known as "pin-up" photography. Bernard preferred a moderate use of artificial light. He preferred natural light like the sun at the beach and sometimes added a flash to his light concept. He never had any formal training in photography and credited his success to "two good teachers, trial and error".

By 1940, Bernard's basement darkroom had become his first studio. He started out taking photos of the wives and children of the directors and producers he had come to know through his apprenticeship. As he began making money, he opened a proper studio at 9055 Sunset Blvd. As word spread, he soon came to the attention of agents and other Hollywood professionals who sent actresses his way for photo shoots. He became known as "Bernard of Hollywood". Bernard is credited with first photographing Marilyn Monroe at the Racquet Club in Palm Springs, California, in 1947, when she was still Norma Jeane. She is said to have told Bernard, "Remember, Bernie, you started it all".

In the 1960s, he moved back to Berlin. He was a photojournalist for the German magazine Der Spiegel for the Eichmann Trial in Israel.

In 1984, Bernard became the first still photographer to be honored by the Academy of Motion Picture Arts and Sciences with a 50-year retrospective of his work. In 1999, his photo "Marilyn in White" of Monroe in her wind-blown dress from the movie The Seven Year Itch (1955) was selected as the "Symbol of the Century" by the Museum of Modern Art in New York. The same photograph was also chosen by the International Center of Photography as one of the "20 Unforgettable Photographs".

In the 1980s Bernard was living in Palm Springs and writing his memoirs. He died of cancer on June 3, 1987, at the age 75 in Los Angeles, California.

== Bibliography ==
- Bruno Bernard, Pin-Ups: A Step Beyond: a Portfolio of Breathtaking Beauties (Los Angeles: Bernard of Hollywood Publishing Co., 1950)
- Bruno Bernard, Bernard's Israel (London and New York: Vallentine Mitchell, 1962) ISBN 978-0853030928
- Bruno Bernard, Israel: Bernard's Photographic Impression (Tel Aviv: Editions Steimatzky, 1964)
- Bruno Bernard, Requiem for Marilyn (Abbotsbrook, Buckinghamshire: Kensal Press, 1986) ISBN 978-0946041527
