= The Exorcism =

2024 film by Joshua John Miller

- Theatrical release poster
- Directed by: Joshua John Miller
- Written by: M. A. Fortin; Joshua John Miller
- Produced by: Kevin Williamson; Ben Fast; Bill Block
- Starring: Russell Crowe; Ryan Simpkins; Sam Worthington; Chloe Bailey; Adam Goldberg; Adrian Pasdar; David Hyde Pierce
- Cinematography: Simon Duggan
- Edited by: Matthew Woolley
- Music by: Danny Bensi; Saunder Jurriaans
- Production companies: Miramax; Outerbanks Entertainment
- Distributed by: Vertical
- Release date: June 21, 2024
- Running time: 95 minutes
- Country: United States
- Language: English
- Box office: $12.6 million

The Exorcism is a 2024 American supernatural horror film starring Russell Crowe as Anthony Miller, an actor whose deteriorating mental state on a horror movie set causes his daughter (Ryan Simpkins) to suspect either his former addictions or a more sinister cause. It is directed by Joshua John Miller, from a script he co-wrote with M. A. Fortin. The film also stars Sam Worthington, Chloe Bailey, Adam Goldberg, Adrian Pasdar, and David Hyde Pierce.

Vertical released The Exorcism in theaters in the United States on June 21, 2024, and digital platforms on July 9, 2024. The film received negative reviews from critics and grossed $12.6 million worldwide.

== Plot ==
In New York City, Tom, an actor playing a priest in a supernatural horror film called The Georgetown Project (resembling The Exorcist), is inspecting the set alone when he is mysteriously killed by a supernatural force.

Peter, the film’s demanding director, taps aging, alcoholic actor Anthony Miller to replace Tom in the film. Anthony's daughter Lee, suspended from high school, is his personal assistant on the film. Both are recovering from her mother's death. Miller's background as a sexual abuse victim comes out, and he has difficulty on the film set and off, often having flashbacks to his molestation. Peter discusses replacing him, and derides Miller's troubled past and lost faith. Lee becomes increasingly concerned about her father's bizarre behavior, including cutting himself, sleepwalking, and refusing to take his medication.

Meanwhile, Lee makes friends with Blake, a popular TV actress who plays a possessed girl in the film. The two of them consult Father Conor, a Catholic priest and psychiatrist who is a consultant for the film, about Miller's frightening behavior. Miller acts on set as if possessed, contorting his body and slamming his head into a table. He is replaced by co-star Joe, who was originally playing his colleague. When alone on set, Joe sees a phantom of Miller and is killed by flying glass from a mirror. At home, Miller suddenly attacks Lee, then jumps out a window.

Father Conor decides to perform an exorcism. The possessed Miller, having survived the fall, is hiding on set. Lee finds Conor and Blake paralyzed in front of Miller, who ridicules Lee's attempts to use a prayer book. She manages to burn him with a crucifix, which snaps Conor and Blake out of paralysis. Conor offers himself to the demon, telling the girls to run. After Conor is possessed, Miller is roused to stab him with the crucifix, and to use the prayer book's exorcism rite sincerely as Lee and Blake also join in. Conor catches on fire and the demon is defeated.

Sometime later, Miller kneels in a confessional and declares "Forgive me, Father, for I have sinned. It has been one day since my last confession," signaling that he has returned to Catholicism. He shares that things have never been better between his daughter and him, muses on the meaning of forgiveness, and concludes what's happening at that point in his life "must be grace--it feels like grace." We see Lee on a beach in LA, emailing her latest film script to her father, with a note that she'll see him tomorrow.

== Cast ==
- Russell Crowe as Anthony Miller, an actor
- Ryan Simpkins as Lee Miller, Anthony's daughter
- Sam Worthington as Joe
- Chloe Bailey as Blake Holloway
- Adam Goldberg as Peter
- Adrian Pasdar as Tom
- David Hyde Pierce as Father Conor
- Tracey Bonner as Regina
- Marcenae Lynette as Monica
- Joshua John Miller as FX guy
- Samantha Mathis as Jennifer Simon

== Production ==
In October 2019, it was announced Russell Crowe had joined the cast of the film, then titled The Georgetown Project, with Joshua John Miller directing from a screenplay he wrote with M. A. Fortin. Miramax was to produce the film. In November 2019, Ryan Simpkins, Chloe Bailey, Sam Worthington, David Hyde Pierce, Tracey Bonner, Samantha Mathis, Adrian Pasdar and Adam Goldberg joined the cast of the film.

Principal photography began in Wilmington, North Carolina in November 2019 and wrapped in December. Additional filming was delayed due to COVID-19 and did not take place until 2023 in New York City, Los Angeles and Australia. Post-production did not finish until January 2024. By April 2024, the film had been retitled The Exorcism.

== Release ==
In December 2023, Vertical acquired North American distribution rights to the film and subsequently scheduling it for a theatrical release in the United States on June 21, 2024. Shudder also acquired pay-one rights to the film. The movie was released on digital platforms on July 9, 2024 and was released on DVD and Blu-ray on September 24, 2024.

== Reception ==
=== Box office ===
As of January 8, 2025, The Exorcism has grossed $4.5 million in the United States and Canada, and $8.1 million in other territories, for a worldwide total of $12.6 million.

In the United States and Canada, The Exorcism was released alongside The Bikeriders and Thelma, and was projected to gross $1–2 million from 2,240 theaters (setting a record as the highest amount of theaters for a Vertical release) in its opening weekend. It ended up debuting to $2.5 million, finishing in seventh.

=== Critical response ===
On the review aggregator website Rotten Tomatoes, 28% of 120 critics' reviews are positive, with an average rating of 4.6/10. The website's consensus reads: "The power of Crowe compels up to a point in this metatextual riff on the possession genre, but The Exorcism's greatest sin is ultimately falling back on clichés." Metacritic, which uses a weighted average, assigned the film a score of 46 out of 100, based on 20 critics, indicating "mixed or average" reviews. Audiences polled by CinemaScore gave the film an average grade of "D" on an A+ to F scale, while those polled by PostTrak gave it a 38% positive score.
