= Queen of the South (TV series) =

American crime drama television series

- Genre: Action; Crime; Drama; Thriller
- Based on: The Queen of the South by Arturo Pérez-Reverte
- Developed by: M.A. Fortin; Joshua John Miller
- Starring: Alice Braga; Peter Gadiot; Hemky Madera; Molly Burnett; Veronica Falcon; Joaquim de Almeida; Justina Machado; Gerardo Taracena; Alfonso Herrera; Jon-Michael Ecker; Joseph T. Campos; David Andrews
- Theme music composer: Giorgio Moroder; Raney Shockne
- Opening theme: "The Queen of the South"
- Composers: Giorgio Moroder; Raney Shockne
- Country of origin: United States
- Original language: English
- No. of seasons: 5
- No. of episodes: 62 (list of episodes)

Production
- Executive producers: David Friendly; Scott Rosenbaum; M.A. Fortin; Joshua John Miller; Natalie Chaidez; Dailyn Rodriguez; Benjamin Daniel Lobato; Alice Braga
- Producers: Robert J. Wilson; Lorenzo O'Brien; Matthew J. Lieberman; Judd Rea
- Cinematography: Alejandro Martinez; Cameron Duncan; John Brawley; Abraham Martinez
- Running time: 38–45 minutes
- Production companies: Frequency Films (season 1); Friendly Films; Skeeter Rosenbaum Productions (season 1); 20th Television (Note: Credited as Fox 21 Television Studios for the first four seasons.); Universal Content Productions (Note: Credited as Universal Cable Productions for the first 3 seasons.)

Original release
- Network: USA Network
- Release: June 23, 2016 – June 9, 2021

Queen of the South is an American crime drama television series developed by M.A. Fortin and Joshua John Miller. The series premiered on June 23, 2016, and concluded on June 9, 2021, with 62 episodes aired on USA Network. It is an adaptation of the Spanish-language telenovela La Reina del Sur which airs on USA's sister network Telemundo; both are adapted from the novel The Queen of the South by Spanish author Arturo Pérez-Reverte. The series was renewed for a fifth season on August 29, 2019. Production of the new season was suspended indefinitely on March 14, 2020, due to COVID-19, but resumed in fall 2020. On March 8, 2021, it was announced that the fifth season would premiere on April 7, 2021, and serve as the series' final season.

== Plotline ==
Queen of the South is an adaptation of the telenovela La Reina del Sur, which is itself an adaptation of the novel of the same name by Spanish author Arturo Pérez-Reverte. The series centers around Teresa Mendoza, a poor Mexican woman who becomes wealthy by building a vast drug empire.

Teresa lives in the barrio of Culiacán in Sinaloa, Mexico. She falls in love with a member of a drug cartel, and tries to rise above her life's impoverished condition. After she is told her boyfriend has been murdered, she is forced to flee. She crosses the border to the United States, where she ends up in the criminal organization of the wife of the cartel boss who is after her. Teresa has a different vision of the drug distribution business and due to her charisma attracts associates and starts her own drug distributing organization. Teresa becomes very successful, which presents her with more problems, makes her endure sacrifices and attracts the attention of covert government forces.

== Cast and characters ==
=== Main ===
- Alice Braga as Teresa Mendoza, a poor woman from Sinaloa, Mexico, who becomes wealthy by building a vast drug empire.
- Peter Gadiot as James Valdez (seasons 1–3, 5; guest season 4), Camila's right-hand man and Teresa's mentor, friend, partner, and lover
- Veronica Falcón as Doña Camila Vargas (seasons 1–3), Don Epifanio's estranged wife and head of the North American branch of the Vargas Cartel in Dallas, Texas
- Hemky Madera as Pote Galvez, a former Vargas Cartel lieutenant who has since become one of Teresa Mendoza's strongest allies. Kelly Anne's boyfriend
- Joaquim de Almeida as Don Epifanio Vargas, Camila Vargas's husband (seasons 1–2, guest season 3), head of the Vargas Cartel (see: Sinaloa Cartel), and a candidate for the governor of Sinaloa
- Justina Machado as Brenda Parra (season 1, guest season 4), the wife of a high-ranking transporter for the Vargas Cartel, and Teresa's best friend when the series begins
- Molly Burnett as Kelly Anne Van Awken (season 5; recurring seasons 2–4), a Dallas socialite who becomes Teresa's lawyer and part of her inner circle. Pote's girlfriend
- Gerardo Taracena as Cesar "Batman" Guemes (seasons 1–2), Don Epifanio Vargas's right-hand man
- Jon-Michael Ecker as Raymundo "Güero" Dávila (season 2, recurring season 1, guest seasons 3–4), Teresa's first boyfriend and a drug dealer
- Nick Sagar as DEA agent Alonzo Loya (seasons 2–3).
- Yancey Arias as Alberto Cortez, a corrupt army Colonel (season 3; recurring season 2)
- Alfonso Herrera as Javier Jiménez, Boaz's cousin (season 4, recurring season 3), a member of the Jiménez cartel and a mercenary willing to kill for the highest bidder
- David Andrews as Judge Cecil Lafayette (season 4, recurring season 5), a corrupt judge who makes things harder for Teresa's drug operation in New Orleans

=== Recurring ===
- Joseph T. Campos as Boaz Jiménez, a former cartel leader (and Javier's cousin) who later runs Teresa's operations in Sinaloa and Miami.
- Ryan O'Nan as King George (seasons 2–5), a smuggler who helps Teresa build her empire.
- Idalia Valles as Isabela Vargas (seasons 1–3), the daughter of Camila and Epifanio Vargas.
- Jamie Hector as Devon Finch (seasons 2–3, 5), CIA contractor posing as a drug dealer.
- Snow Tha Product (seasons 2–3) as Little T, a gang member whom Teresa engages to protect Camila in prison and who later becomes a trusted member of her inner circle.
- Iba Thiam as Bilal (seasons 2–3), King George's right-hand man
- Mark Consuelos as Teo Aljarafe (seasons 1–2), the first lawyer Camila Vargas employs while setting in motion her plan for independence.
- Brett Cullen as Cole Van Awken (season 2), Kelly Anne's husband, Camila's lover and lawyer. He is instrumental in forging documents that lead to the fallout between Camila and Teresa.
- Martha Higareda as Castel Fioto (seasons 2–3, guest season 4), Teresa's Colombian supplier, who has friendly ties with the CIA.
- Joe Renteria as Reynaldo Fioto, (seasons 2–3), the Colombian supplier of the Vargas family, who gets killed by his niece Castel.
- John Pyper-Ferguson as Agent Finnerman (season 2), DEA Agent trying to turn Teresa against Camila.
- Blair Bomer as Kim Brown (season 1), James's ex-girlfriend.
- Michel Duval as Enrique "Kique" Jiménez (seasons 2–3), son of Boaz Jimenez, and later fiancé of Isabela Vargas.
- Felipe Barrientos as The Charger, Camila Vargas's gang master, who later becomes a close member of Teresa's inner circle.
- Pete Partida as Tonto (seasons 1–3), a sicario working for Camila and James.
- Adolfo Alvarez as Tony Parra (seasons 1–2), Brenda's son and Teresa's godson.
- Julio César Cedillo as Manuel Jiménez (seasons 1–2), Boaz's brother, head of the Jiménez cartel and competitor to the Vargas cartel.
- Gustavo Hernández as Pedro Jiménez (season 2), Kique's cousin who kidnaps Isabela Vargas.
- James Martinez as Gato Fierros (season 1), a lieutenant in the Vargas Cartel
- Paola Andino as Olivia Gutiérrez (season 2), a close friend of Isabela Vargas since their childhood. She introduces Isabela into the drug-fueled party lifestyle of a "narco-brat".
- Electra Avelan as Leo (season 2), Güero's ex-girlfriend
- Armando Riesco as Pecas (season 3), the narco boss of La Comisión, a group trafficking in Arizona.
- Zahn McClarnon (season 3), as Taza, a member of La Comisión, who puts his trust in Teresa.
- A Martínez as Sheriff Jed Mayo (season 3), a corrupt sheriff in Phoenix whom Teresa and James are forced to work with.
- Abel Becerra as Bedoya (season 3), a member of La Comisión, who Teresa and James use as bait.
- Dominique Burgess as Ivan (season 3), Teresa's IT specialist.
- Maruis Biegai as Oleg Stavinsky (seasons 3 & 5), an associate of Teresa from Europe.
- Alimi Ballard as Marcel Dumas (seasons 4–5), a slick and measured Creole leader of a New Orleans street gang, and owner of a hip jazz club.
- Lance E. Nichols as Lucien (seasons 4–5), Marcel's godfather, an important figure in the NOLA crime scene.
- Vera Cherny as Oksana Volkova (seasons 4–5), a Russian drug dealer based in Atlanta who partners with Teresa and El Gordo. Kostya's cousin and Samara's mother.
- Chris Greene as Bobby Leroux (season 4), Marcel Dumas's right-hand man
- Pêpê Rapazote as Raul 'El Gordo' Rodriguez (season 4), a Cuban drug dealer based in Miami who partners with Teresa and Oksana.
- Christopher Márquez as Elias (season 4), El Gordo's nephew and right-hand man
- Bailey Chase as Eddie Brucks (season 4), a musician attempting to overcome his personal demons who crosses paths with Teresa.
- Chelsea Tavares as Birdie (season 4), a New Orleans mixology whiz who works at Teresa's bar.
- Sofía Lama as Emilia (season 4), Javier's girlfriend and Boaz's ex-fiancé.
- David Bianchi as Manny (season 4), one of Teresa's New Orleans soldiers.
- Alejandro Barrios as Chicho (seasons 4–5), one of Teresa's New Orleans soldiers and later, Kelly Anne's bodyguard
- Julian Silva as Tony Parra (season 4), Brenda's son and Teresa's godson.
- Cory Hart as Detective Randall Greene (season 4), a corrupt New Orleans cop who is Judge Lafayette's right-hand man
- Derek Evans as Davis Lafayette (season 4), Judge Lafayette's emotionally fragile son.
- Donald Paul as Cedric (seasons 4–5), the savvy and sly hit man gangster working for Marcel Dumas and sometimes for the Queen
- Manuel Ramirez as Angel Jimenez (season 5), Boaz's cousin.
- Antonio Haramillo as Osvaldo Ruiz (season 5), Boaz's friend in charge of the Sinaloa operation.
- Pasha Lychnikoff as Kostya, a Russian mafia boss hiding as a Russian diplomat in the U.S. and Oksana's cousin (season 5)
- Eve Harlow as Samara Volkova, (season 5), Oksana's daughter.

=== Guest ===
- Rafael Amaya as Aurelio Casillas (seasons 1–2), a drug lord
- Remy Ma as Vee, one of Devon Finch's soldiers (season 3)
- MC Lyte as Devon Finch's sister, the Professor (seasons 2–3)
- Steven Bauer as El Santo (season 2–3), a crazy coke producer from Bolivia who runs a sect and in whose family Teresa ingratiates herself.
- Naturi Naughton as Sasha Bishop (season 3)
- Jordi Molla as Rocco de la Pena (season 3), a banker with whom Teresa does business in Malta.
- Claudia Ferri as La Capitana (season 3), a military captain chasing El Santo. She makes Teresa's trip to Bolivia extremely dangerous.
- Elvis Nolasco as Oscar Polanko (season 5), a Dominican drug dealer in NYC with whom Teresa forges an alliance.
- Moses J. Moseley as Tic Tok, one of Marcel Dumas's soldiers (season 4)
- Nikki Dixon as DEA Agent Valerie Postak.
- West Liang as Billy Lin (season 3), Devon Finch's right-hand man
- Wallace Carranza as Barbaro (season 1) General of the Vargas Cartel under Camila Vargas.
- Ximena Duque as Eva Buemeros (season 2), Epifanio's smart and ambitious young assistant
- Jason Vendryes as Spears, one of Devon Finch's henchmen (season 5)

== Episodes ==
Season	Episodes	Originally released	
Season	Episodes	First released	Last released
1	13	June 23, 2016	September 15, 2016
2	13	June 8, 2017	August 31, 2017
3	13	June 21, 2018	September 13, 2018
4	13	June 6, 2019	August 29, 2019
5	10	April 7, 2021	June 9, 2021

== Reception ==
=== Critical response ===
Queen of the South's first season received mixed to positive feedback from critics. On Rotten Tomatoes, it has a score of 68%, based on 19 reviews, with an average rating of 6.18/10. The site's consensus reads: "Queen of the South enlivens an overdone premise with action and narrative vigor—and shows hints of intriguing potential." On Metacritic, the first season scored 59 out of 100, based on 16 critics, indicating "mixed or average reviews".

=== Ratings ===
Viewership and ratings per season of Queen of the South
Season	Timeslot (ET)	Episodes	First aired		Last aired		Avg. viewers (millions)	18–49 rank	Avg. 18–49 rating
Season	Timeslot (ET)	Episodes	Date	Viewers (millions)	Date	Viewers (millions)	Avg. viewers (millions)	18–49 rank	Avg. 18–49 rating
1	Thursday 10:00 pm	13	June 23, 2016	1.39	September 15, 2016	1.35	1.22	TBD	0.39
2	Thursday 10:00 pm	13	June 8, 2017	1.25	August 31, 2017	1.33	1.16	TBD	0.38
3	Thursday 9:00 pm	13	June 21, 2018	1.24	September 13, 2018	1.22	1.13	TBD	0.37
4	Thursday 10:00 pm	13	June 6, 2019	0.99	August 29, 2019	1.04	0.92	TBD	0.29
5	Wednesday 10:00 pm	10	April 7, 2021	0.69	June 9, 2021	0.71	0.89	TBD	0.19

=== Awards and nominations ===
Year	Award	Category	Nominee	Result	Ref.
2017	Imagen Awards	Best Primetime Television Series – Drama	Queen of the South	Won	
2017	Imagen Awards	Best Supporting Actor – Television	Peter Gadiot	Won	
2017	Imagen Awards	Best Actress – Television	Alice Braga	Nominated	
2017	Imagen Awards	Best Actor – Television	Joaquim de Almeida	Nominated	
2017	Imagen Awards	Best Supporting Actress – Television	Veronica Falcón	Nominated	
2018	WIN Awards	Film or Show Written By a Woman	Natalie Chaidez	Won	
2018	WIN Awards	Drama Series	Queen Of the South	Nominated	
2018	Imagen Awards	Best Primetime Television Series – Drama	Queen of the South	Nominated	
2018	Imagen Awards	Best Actress – Television	Alice Braga	Nominated	
2018	Imagen Awards	Best Actor – Television	Joaquim de Almeida	Nominated	
2018	Imagen Awards	Best Supporting Actress – Television	Veronica Falcón	Nominated	
2018	Imagen Awards	Best Supporting Actor – Television	Jon-Michael Ecker	Nominated	
2018	Imagen Awards	Best Supporting Actor – Television	Peter Gadiot	Nominated	
2019	Imagen Awards	Best Primetime Television Series – Drama	Queen of the South	Nominated	
2019	Imagen Awards	Best Actress – Television	Alice Braga	Nominated	
2019	Imagen Awards	Best Supporting Actor – Television	Hemky Madera	Nominated	
2020	Imagen Awards	Best Primetime Television Series – Drama	Queen of the South	Nominated	
2020	Imagen Awards	Best Actress – Television	Alice Braga	Nominated	
2020	Imagen Awards	Best Supporting Actor – Television	Hemky Madera	Nominated	
2021	Imagen Awards	Best Primetime Television Series – Drama	Queen of the South	Nominated	
2021	Imagen Awards	Best Actress – Television	Alice Braga	Nominated	

=== Broadcast ===
Internationally, the series premiered in Australia on Showcase on August 4, 2016. German TV channel DMAX has been showing the series since June 14, 2017.

The series is also available on Netflix. Netflix owned first run rights to the show globally since 2016.

== Inspiration ==
Pérez-Reverte, author of the novel, has stated that a great source of inspiration was Mexican narcocorridos (drug ballads), country-polka songs that tell the stories about real life Mexican drug lords.

One of the real-life characters who inspired the novel is Sandra Ávila Beltrán, known as the "Queen of the Pacific", famous for being one of the first female drug traffickers to reach the level of "boss" in the Mexican cartels, a place usually reserved for men.
