= The Final Girls =

2015 American comedy horror film

- Theatrical release poster
- Directed by: Todd Strauss-Schulson
- Written by: M.A. Fortin; Joshua John Miller
- Produced by: Michael London; Janice Williams
- Starring: Taissa Farmiga; Malin Akerman; Adam DeVine; Thomas Middleditch; Alia Shawkat; Alexander Ludwig; Nina Dobrev
- Cinematography: Elie Smolkin
- Edited by: Debbie Berman
- Music by: Gregory James Jenkins
- Production companies: Groundswell Productions; Studio Solutions; Ulterior Productions
- Distributed by: Stage 6 Films
- Release dates: March 13, 2015 (SXSW); October 9, 2015 (United States)
- Running time: 91 minutes
- Country: United States
- Language: English
- Budget: $4.5 million

The Final Girls is a 2015 American black comedy slasher film directed by Todd Strauss-Schulson and written by M.A. Fortin and Joshua John Miller. The film stars Taissa Farmiga and Malin Akerman, with supporting performances from Adam DeVine, Thomas Middleditch, Alia Shawkat, Alexander Ludwig, and Nina Dobrev. The plot follows a group of high school students who are transported into a 1986 slasher film called Camp Bloodbath.

The film was originally picked up by New Line Cinema in November 2011, but the script was shopped elsewhere when production did not get off the ground. Later, Sony Pictures Worldwide Acquisitions bought the rights to the film under the Stage 6 Films banner, with Michael London and his company Groundswell Productions producing the feature. Principal photography lasted a month in April–May 2014, taking place in Baton Rouge and St. Francisville, Louisiana.

The Final Girls had its world premiere on March 13, 2015 at South by Southwest. It was released in the United States on October 9, 2015 in a limited theatrical run and through video on demand by Stage 6 and Vertical. The Final Girls received generally positive reviews from critics, with many praising the performances and atmosphere, as well as its direction, screenplay and homages to 1980s horror films.

== Plot ==
Max Cartwright waits while her actress mother, Amanda, auditions for a film. When she returns, Amanda complains that she'll only be known as scream queen Nancy in the 1986 slasher film Camp Bloodbath, a cult classic. On the way home, the two get into a car accident and Amanda is killed but Max survives.

Three years later, on the anniversary of her mother's death, Max is studying with her friends Gertie and Chris. Gertie's stepbrother Duncan, a horror film fanatic, shows up and persuades Max to attend a special double-feature showing of Camp Bloodbath 1 and 2. At the screening, Max finds Vicki, Chris' possessive ex-girlfriend and her former best friend, there as well. During the film, the theater is accidentally set ablaze. To get to safety, Max cuts a hole in the screen and the group step through.

Max, Chris, Gertie, Duncan, and Vicki wake up in the woods. They encounter a van with characters from Camp Bloodbath, asking for directions to the camp. The van leaves only to come back every 92 minutes, and the group realize they are in a time loop and have somehow been transported into the movie. When the van returns once more, the group pass themselves off as new camp counselors and hitch a ride to camp. They let the first couple of murders happen without interference. The movies' antagonist, machete-wielding killer Billy Murphy, spots them but only stares without attacking. Duncan attempts to take a selfie with Billy, only to be stabbed, dispelling the belief that they will be spared for not being movie characters.

The group tries to stop the cast from having sex, as Billy shows up whenever someone does. Chris distracts Kurt, while Max persuades Nancy to stay a virgin. Vicki sticks with Paula, the movie's Final Girl, and Gertie bonds with Blake. When Gertie brings up the topic of Billy, the counselors are alerted to the fact that the "urban legend" of Billy is "real" and will come to kill them. In a panic, the counselors try to flee. Kurt and Paula drive off, but when Duncan emerges still alive, the car hits him and then crashes into a totem pole, killing all three.

Now aware that the characters who originally survived the movie can die, Max and the others decide to save anyone they can. They dress Tina in a life jacket and mittens, to prevent her from undressing. They also decide that Max, the only remaining virgin, is the new Final Girl, and plot to get Billy's machete into her hands so she can kill him and end the film. Meanwhile, Max and Nancy bond, and theorize that maybe if Nancy survives, she can go back home with Max and be whoever she wants.

The group booby trap the cabin, then Tina lures Billy to them by performing a striptease. Tina panics as Billy gets closer and is killed when a trip wire accidentally sends her headfirst into a bear trap. Blake, Vicki and Gertie are also killed fighting off Billy. Chris, Nancy, and Max flee the cabin, and Billy chases after them. They attempt to escape into a flashback, but Chris is stabbed, and Billy kidnaps Nancy. Max finds her at Billy's barn hideout, and the two women fight him, which results in Max getting stabbed, before they both escape.

After the two retreat to the chapel, Max tells Nancy that in the real world she is Max's mother. Nancy realizes that in order for Max to become the true Final Girl, she must sacrifice herself, and the two bid each other a tearful farewell before Nancy lures Billy with a striptease and is killed. Max collapses, but, now the Final Girl, awakens with the power to kill Billy. They fight and she eventually decapitates him with his own machete. A wounded Chris arrives and the two kiss, while the credits for Camp Bloodbath play in the sky.

Max wakes up to find herself in the hospital, where she is reunited with her friends. The group hears Billy Murphy's approach tune, and realize they are in Camp Bloodbath 2: Cruel Summer. Billy crashes through the glass doors of the hospital as the title appears, and Max lunges at him.

== Cast ==
- Taissa Farmiga as Max Cartwright
- Malin Akerman as Nancy / Amanda Cartwright
- Alexander Ludwig as Chris Briggs
- Nina Dobrev as Vicki Summers
- Alia Shawkat as Gertie Michaels
- Thomas Middleditch as Duncan
- Adam DeVine as Kurt
- Angela Trimbur as Tina
- Chloe Bridges as Paula
- Tory N. Thompson as Blake
- Reginald Robinson as Hunky Hiker
- Lauren Gros as Mimi
- Daniel Norris as Billy Murphy
  - Eric Carney as Young Billy
- Bryce Romero as Mean Kid

== Production ==
=== Pre-production ===
"It's Pleasantville in a trashy horror movie from the 80s with a little Back to the Future thrown in, and a spoon full of Terms of Endearment with a dash of Scream and two dollops of Purple Rose of Cairo for good measure."

— Director Todd Strauss-Schulson jokingly describing the genre of the film

In February 2014, it was reported that Sony Pictures Worldwide Acquisitions had bought the rights to the film under the Stage 6 Films banner, with Michael London and his company Groundswell Productions producing the feature. The film was originally picked up by New Line Cinema in November 2011, but the script was shopped elsewhere when production did not get off the ground. The screenplay was written by Joshua John Miller and M.A. Fortin, and was directed by Todd Strauss-Schulson. Miller's father, Jason Miller, was an actor and writer who appeared as Father Karras in The Exorcist. The script for The Final Girls was in part inspired by The Exorcist, with Miller pointing out, "I grew up watching my dad in The Exorcist, and there's something haunting, strange, confusing, and a little bit unnatural to see your parent constantly die in a film. But it's something that also becomes iconic, and we tried to deconstruct what the effects of that would be, as well as what it would be like if you had a second chance, but your second chance was inside of a movie?" Miller and Fortin also served as executive producers, alongside Darren M. Demetre.

=== Casting ===
It was announced on February 27, 2014, that Malin Akerman and Taissa Farmiga had been cast in the two main roles for the film, playing mother-daughter Amanda and Max Cartwright, respectively. On April 10, 2014, it was revealed that Thomas Middleditch, Alexander Ludwig, Nina Dobrev, and Adam DeVine had joined the cast in supporting roles. Middleditch stars as Duncan, a fan of the Camp Bloodbath films; Ludwig portrays Chris Briggs, the love interest of Max; Dobrev plays Vicki Summers, Max's former best friend; and DeVine stars as Kurt, Camp Bloodbath's lothario. Alia Shawkat, Chloe Bridges, and Angela Trimbur also joined the cast of the film, portraying Max's best friend Gertie Michaels, and Camp Bloodbath characters Paula and Tina, respectively.

=== Filming ===
Principal photography was reported to last for 26 days in Baton Rouge and St. Francisville, Louisiana. Production for the film began on April 22, 2014, with an estimated budget of $4.5 million. On April 23, 2014, a photo from the set was revealed by one of the cast. Over 200 extras were sought out for large scenes. Principal photography for the film concluded on May 25, 2014. In late October 2014, some of the cast and crew returned for pick-ups and scene re-shoots following a test screening earlier that month.

=== Post-production ===
Post-production primarily took place in New York City, with additional editing taking place at Sony Pictures Studios in Culver City, California. Sound mixing was provided by Parabolic in New York City. On October 2, 2014, an edit of the film was screened in Los Angeles to a test audience of teenagers. Following this, some of the cast and crew returned for re-shoots and pick-ups. On December 22, 2014, Strauss-Schulson stated that post-production had been completed for the film. According to Strauss-Schulson, the film was required to be rated PG-13, at the studio's request.

== Soundtrack ==
The Final Girls: Original Motion Picture Soundtrack

Soundtrack album by Gregory James Jenkins
- Released: November 13, 2015
- Genre: Score
- Length: 57:39
- Label: Varèse Sarabande

Gregory James Jenkins composed the film score, having previously done so for two of Strauss-Schulson's short films and debut feature A Very Harold & Kumar 3D Christmas (2011). Jenkins stated, "One of the biggest challenges was trying to create a score that was heavily steeped in 1980's while still trying to bring something new to the table... This is not your typical film score, as it's mostly electronic based... A lot of analog synths were used."

The Final Girls: Original Motion Picture Soundtrack was released via digital download on November 13, 2015 by Varèse Sarabande, prior to a physical CD release in December. Songs not on the soundtrack but featured in the film include "Dance Hall Days" by Wang Chung, "Bette Davis Eyes" by Kim Carnes, "Wild Heart" by Bleachers, "Mickey" by Toni Basil, "Lollipop" by The Chordettes, "Heartbreakers" by The Cold Crush Brothers, "Cherry Pie" by Warrant, and "Cruel Summer" by Bananarama.

== Release ==
The Final Girls had its world premiere on March 13, 2015 at South by Southwest. The film was one of the festival's opening night films, screening at The Paramount Theatre. It then closed the Stanley Film Festival on May 2, 2015, and had a gala premiere at the Los Angeles Film Festival on June 16, 2015. The film also later screened at the 2015 Toronto International Film Festival on September 19, 2015, and the Sitges Film Festival on October 12, 2015.

The film received a video on demand and limited release on October 9, 2015 by Stage 6 Films. In April 2016, two special midnight screenings of the film were held at the Sunshine Cinema in New York City, followed by a Q&A with co-star Alia Shawkat and director Todd Strauss-Schulson. A panel for the film was held at San Diego Comic-Con on July 23, 2016, with Strauss-Schulson, Fortin, Miller, Middleditch, and Trimbur appearing. Vertical Entertainment theatrically distributed the film, but did not receive a marquee credit in the beginning.

=== Marketing ===
The first clip of footage from the film was released on March 13, 2015 exclusively by Deadline Hollywood. A film still featuring Malin Åkerman was also released the same day. More promotional stills were released on August 3, 2015 exclusively by Entertainment Weekly, along with the announcement of the film's release date. The first official trailer was released on August 21, 2015 by Apple Trailers. On September 21, 2015, the official theatrical poster was released, along with another film clip, exclusively by BuzzFeed. On October 1, 2015, Rotten Tomatoes premiered an exclusive clip from the film. On October 6, 2015, another clip was released via Apple Trailers. On October 8, 2015, an exclusive retro poster designed by Alex Pardee debuted at the New York Comic Con, along with accompanying character posters. The following day, design company Mondo released a re-imagined poster for the film.

=== Home media ===
The film was released straight-to-DVD in the UK on October 12, 2015, Australia on November 5, 2015, Italy on November 11, 2015, Germany on November 12, 2015, and Spain and Japan on December 2, 2015. It was released via DVD and Blu-ray in the United States and Canada on November 3, 2015. The film had its television premiere on June 26, 2016 on Freeform.

As of March 2019, the film has made $1.3 million through domestic DVD and Blu-ray sales.

== Reception ==
=== Critical response ===
The Final Girls received positive reviews from film critics. On Rotten Tomatoes it has a 76% approval rating based on reviews from 78 critics, with an average rating of 6.30/10. The site's critical consensus reads, "The Final Girls offers an affectionate nod to slasher tropes while adding a surprising layer of genuine emotion to go with the meta amusement." On Metacritic, the film holds a rating of 59 out of 100, based on 13 critics, indicating "mixed or average reviews".

Dennis Harvey of Variety gave a positive review, writing, "Though not quite as inspired or consistent as the similarly self-mocking likes of The Cabin in the Woods, Tucker & Dale vs. Evil or the first two Scream pics, this is good fun that should delight genre fans." Justin Lowe of The Hollywood Reporter wrote, "Genre enthusiasts will get a kick out of Todd Strauss-Schulson's creative homage to classic slasher movies, which respects familiar horror conventions while introducing a sly contemporary perspective."

Laura Kern of Film Comment called the film a "sharp, wickedly funny, and unexpectedly heartfelt homage" to slasher films, adding, "It's a gimmicky premise, perhaps, but a highly effective one. No mere meta-exercise, the film innovatively blends the worlds of the 1986 teens of Camp Bloodbath with the modern-day ones." And Sebastian Zavala, writing for Screen Anarchy, declared, "Part deconstruction of 80s slasher movies, and part emotional mother-daughter bonding drama, the film works surprisingly well considering it lacks many of the staples horror flicks such as Friday the 13th were famous for; namely, the blood and nudity." The film ranked ninth on BuzzFeed's 19 Best Horror Films of 2015 list, and tenth on Rolling Stone's 10 Best Horror Movies of 2015 list.

=== Accolades ===
Year	Award	Category	Recipient(s)	Result	Ref.
2015	Stanley Film Festival	Audience Award for Feature Film	The Final Girls	Won	
2015	Toronto International Film Festival	People's Choice Award for Best Midnight Madness Film	The Final Girls	Runner-up	
2015	Mile High Horror Film Festival	Audience Award for Best Feature Film	The Final Girls	Won	
2015	Sitges Film Festival	Best Motion Picture	The Final Girls	Nominated	
2015	Sitges Film Festival	Special Jury Award	The Final Girls	Won	
2015	Sitges Film Festival	Best Screenplay	M.A. Fortin and Joshua John Miller	Won	
2016	Fright Meter Awards	Best Screenplay	M.A. Fortin and Joshua John Miller	Won	
2016	Fright Meter Awards	Best Actress in a Leading Role	Taissa Farmiga	Nominated	
2016	Fright Meter Awards	Best Actress in a Supporting Role	Malin Åkerman	Nominated	
2016	Fright Meter Awards	Best Editing	Debbie Berman	Nominated	
2016	Fright Meter Awards	Best Score	Gregory James Jenkins	Nominated	
2016	Fright Meter Awards	Best Horror Movie	The Final Girls	Nominated	
2016	Fangoria Chainsaw Awards	Best Limited Release Film	The Final Girls	Nominated	
2016	Fangoria Chainsaw Awards	Best Screenplay	M.A. Fortin and Joshua John Miller	Nominated	
2016	Fangoria Chainsaw Awards	Best Supporting Actress	Malin Åkerman	Nominated	

== Possible sequel ==
In March 2015, at the South by Southwest premiere, screenwriter M.A. Fortin stated that there had been discussions about a potential sequel, and if a second film was to be made, the father of Max would be revealed.

At the 2015 Toronto International Film Festival, Strauss-Schulson said that fans seeing the film in theaters and spreading the word would help convince Sony to produce a sequel. He later stated that the making of a sequel also depends on the box office performance of the film and its profitability to the studio. As of 2026, nothing has materialized.

== See also ==
- Final girl (horror trope)
