= And You Thought Your Parents Were Weird =

1991 film by Tony Cookson

- Directed by: Tony Cookson
- Written by: Tony Cookson
- Produced by: Just Betzer
- Starring: Marcia Strassman; Joshua Miller; Edan Gross; John Quade; Sam Behrens; Alan Thicke
- Cinematography: Paul Elliott
- Edited by: Michael Ornstein
- Music by: Randy Miller
- Production company: Panorama Film International
- Distributed by: Trimark Pictures
- Release date: November 15, 1991
- Running time: 92 minutes
- Country: United States
- Language: English
- Budget: $5 million
- Box office: $202,590

And You Thought Your Parents Were Weird is a 1991 American comedy film written and directed by Tony Cookson in his feature directorial debut. The film stars Marcia Strassman, Joshua Miller, Edan Gross, John Quade, Sam Behrens, and Alan Thicke. It follows two inventor brothers Josh and Max Carson who create a robot. But after Josh uses a ouija board at a Halloween party, the robot later on becomes inhabited by the spirit of their deceased father.

The film was theatrically released in the United States on November 15, 1991, by Trimark Pictures. It received mixed reviews from critics and underperformed at the box office. For his performance, Miller was nominated for the Saturn Award for Best Performance by a Younger Actor.

== Plot ==
Two brothers Josh and Max attempt to invent a fully mobile robot with advanced artificial intelligence to help their mother, Sarah, with household chores. However, after a playfully performed séance on Halloween, the ghost of their late father, Matthew, possesses the robot. The boys are overjoyed at the return of their father, but it soon becomes apparent that the people who stole their father's work are after their robot, Newman. Eventually, Matthew returns to the afterlife after setting his boys on the right path as they sell the plans for their robot to a rich Texan investor.

== Cast ==
- Marcia Strassman as Sarah Carson
- Joshua Miller as Josh Carson
- Edan Gross as Max Carson
- John Quade as Walter Kotzwinkle
- Sam Behrens as Steve Franklin
- Alan Thicke as Matthew Carson / Newman (voice)
- Susan Gibney as Alice Woods
- A. J. Langer as Beth Allen
- Gustav Vintas as Jaeger
- Eric Walker as Dwayne Kotswinkle
- Bill Smillie as Henry Kilbrandt
- Robert Clotworthy as Mike Abbot
- Armin Shimerman as Contest Announcer
- Allan Wasserman as Mel
- Susan Brecht as Computer Teacher
- Michael Strasser as Policeman
- Ken Lerner as Matthew Carson (home movies)

== Production ==
In June 1990, it was reported that producer Just Betzer planned to finance the film through his company, Panorama Film International. Principal photography began in mid-July 1990 in Los Angeles, California, under the working title Newman, and wrapped in late-May 1991.

== Reception ==
=== Box office ===
The film was a box-office bomb, grossing only $202,590 in North America.

=== Critical response ===
Janet Maslin of The New York Times stated, "And You Thought Your Parents Were Weird has a low-budget look and a lot of strained wholesomeness, although it works best when its eccentricities are allowed to show." Michael Wilmington of the Los Angeles Times called it "a cute robot movie" and noted, "And You Thought Your Parents Were Weird is so soft and squishy, that any decently cute robot would probably sink through its center like a stone." Roger Ebert of the Chicago Sun-Times gave the film two out of four stars, and wrote, "And You Thought Your Parents Were Weird seems inspired by several different sources. […] Is the movie worth seeing on its own? Only marginally; it's the kind of entertainment that seems like more fun on Nickelodeon than when you paid for your ticket."

=== Accolades ===
Year	Award	Category	Recipient	Result
1992	18th Saturn Awards	Best Performance by a Younger Actor	Joshua John Miller	Nominated
1993	14th Youth in Film Awards	Best Young Actor Starring in a Motion Picture	Joshua John Miller	Nominated
1993	14th Youth in Film Awards	Best Young Actor Co-Starring in a Motion Picture	Edan Gross	Nominated
1993	14th Youth in Film Awards	Best Young Actress Co-Starring in a Motion Picture	A. J. Langer	Nominated
