= Joshua John Miller =

American actor (born 1974)

- Born: December 26, 1974 (age 51); Los Angeles, California, U.S.
- Education: University of California, Los Angeles
- Occupations: Actor; screenwriter; director; author; producer
- Years active: 1982–present
- Partner: M. A. Fortin
- Parents: Jason Miller (father); Susan Bernard (mother)
- Relatives: Jason Patric (half-brother); Bruno Bernard (grandfather)

Joshua John Miller (born December 26, 1974) is an American actor, screenwriter, author, and director. Miller co-writes with his life partner M. A. Fortin; the two wrote the screenplay for the 2015 horror comedy The Final Girls, and the USA Network drama series Queen of the South.

== Personal life ==
Miller was born in Los Angeles to actor and Pulitzer Prize-winning playwright Jason Miller and actress and Playboy pin-up Susan Bernard. Miller's elder paternal half-brother is actor Jason Patric, and his maternal grandfather was photographer Bruno Bernard, also known as "Bernard of Hollywood". His father was of Irish and German descent, and his mother was Jewish.

Miller is gay and, as of 2013, is in a relationship with fellow screenwriter M. A. Fortin.

== Career ==
Miller began appearing in films and television when he was eight years old. His first film role was in Halloween III: Season of the Witch. He would go on to star in such films as River's Edge, Near Dark, Class of 1999, and Teen Witch. Miller also made guest appearances on several popular television shows, including 21 Jump Street, The Wonder Years, The Greatest American Hero, Highway to Heaven (for which he received a Young Artist Award in 1985), and Growing Pains. Miller appeared in several plays, and was involved in dance from a very early age. He starred in the Los Angeles Ballet Company's production of The Nutcracker for three consecutive seasons beginning at age seven, and later appeared as a dancer in Janet Jackson's Grammy Award-winning Rhythm Nation 1814 video.

Miller attended Yale University and Antioch University, and studied creative writing at the University of California, Los Angeles. In 1997, he published a pseudo-autobiographical novel called The Mao Game about a fifteen-year-old child star attempting to cope with heroin addiction, memories of past sexual abuse, and the impending death of his grandmother, who has been diagnosed with cancer. In 1999, The Mao Game was adapted into a film, written and directed by Miller, and co-produced by Whoopi Goldberg. The film starred Miller, Kirstie Alley, and Piper Laurie, and featured Miller's mother, Susan Bernard, in a brief, uncredited cameo. It toured the festival circuit, and garnered mixed reviews from critics.

In December 2003, he completed his MFA in creative writing at the University of Iowa. He was awarded the Capote Fellowship, and was also chosen for the Houghton-Mifflin Fellowship Award. He has also written articles for Harper's Bazaar, Playboy, and Esquire. In 2007, Miller appeared as Jinky in The Wizard of Gore. He has written a second novel, titled Ash.

Miller collaborated with M. A. Fortin to write the DreamWorks TV and Fox production Howl. Miller and Fortin then co-wrote the short film Dawn (2014), which was directed by actress Rose McGowan and premiered at the Sundance Film Festival. The two also co-wrote the screenplay and executive produced the 2015 horror comedy film The Final Girls, directed by Todd Strauss-Schulson and starring Taissa Farmiga and Malin Åkerman. Miller and Fortin wrote the pilot for the USA Network drama series Queen of the South. Miller also serves as an executive producer for the series, which began airing on June 23, 2016.

== Filmography ==
=== As actor ===
Year	Title	Role	Notes
1982	Halloween III: Season of the Witch	Willie Challis	film debut
1982	The Greatest American Hero	Jonathan	Episode: "Good Samaritan"
1984	Family Ties	Kenneth	Episode: "Go Tigers"
1984	The Fantastic World of D.C. Collins	François	Television film
1985	Highway to Heaven	Jason Winner	Episode: "A Song for Jason (Parts 1 & 2)"
1986	Stoogemania	Young Howard	
1986	River's Edge	Tim	
1987	21 Jump Street	Brian Sheffield	Episode: "In the Custody of a Clown"
1987	Near Dark	Homer	
1987–1988	Growing Pains	Friend #1; Devil	Episode: "Not Necessarily The News"; Episode:"Fool for Love"
1988	Cagney & Lacey	Henry Gorvel	Episode: "Hello Goodbye"
1989	Rhythm Nation 1814	B.J.	Short film
1989	Teen Witch	Richie Miller	
1989	Meet the Hollowheads	Joey	
1990	The Wonder Years	Larry Beeman	Episode: "Rock 'n Roll"
1990	Class of 1999	Angel	
1990	The Ghost Writer	Edgar Strack	Television film
1990	Death Warrant	Douglas Tisdale	
1991	And You Thought Your Parents Were Weird	Josh Carson	
1999	The Mao Game	Jordan Highland	
2007	The Wizard of Gore	Jinky	

=== As writer ===
Year	Title	Notes
1999	The Mao Game	Also director
2011	Howl	
2014	Dawn	
2015	The Final Girls	Also executive producer
2016–2021	Queen of the South	Also executive producer
2024	The Exorcism	Also director

== Bibliography ==
- The Mao Game (1997)

== Awards and nominations ==
Year	Award	Category	Work	Result
1986	Young Artist Awards	Exceptional Performance by a Young Actor in a Television Special or Mini-Series	Highway to Heaven	Won
1988	Saturn Awards	Best Performance by a Younger Actor	Near Dark	Nominated
1988	Young Artist Awards	Best Young Actor in a Motion Picture – Drama	River's Edge	Nominated
1989	Young Artist Awards	Best Young Actor in a Cable Family Series	On the Edge	Nominated
1990	Young Artist Awards	Best Young Actor Guest Starring in a Television Series	The Wonder Years	Nominated
1990	Young Artist Awards	Best Young Actor Starring in a Motion Picture	Teen Witch	Nominated
1991	Young Artist Awards	Best Young Actor Starring in a Motion Picture	Class of 1999	Nominated
1992	Saturn Awards	Best Performance by a Younger Actor	And You Thought Your Parents Were Weird	Nominated
1993	Young Artist Awards	Best Young Actor Starring in a Motion Picture	And You Thought Your Parents Were Weird	Nominated
