= Fernanda Coppel =

American screenwriter

Fernanda Coppel is a playwright and screenwriter. Her plays have been produced by Second Stage Theatre and the Atlantic Theater Company in New York. She has written for The Bridge, Kingdom, and How to Get Away with Murder.

== Background ==
Coppel was born in Mazatlán, Mexico and grew up in an all-female household in San Diego, California. She graduated from Merrill College at University of California, Santa Cruz in 2007 with a degree in literature. Instead of going to law school as she had intended, Coppel applied to various MFA programs for playwriting and attended New York University Tisch School of the Arts on a full scholarship. While studying with Marsha Norman at NYU, she applied for and received a Lila Acheson Wallace Playwriting Fellowship at the Juilliard School. She has been a member of INTAR Theatre's Maria Irene Fornes Playwrights Lab, the MCC Playwrights’ Coalition, and the Old Vic's US/UK TS Eliot Exchange Program in 2010. Coppel is openly gay and has stated in an interview: "My artistic agenda is to write as many roles for Latina's as possible and increase Latina/o audiences."

== Career ==
Coppel's plays include King Liz, Chimichangas and Zoloft, Pussy, The Leak, That Douche Bag’s Play, Sinaloa Cowboy, Emma Zapata, and No Homo. These plays have been developed at New York Theatre Workshop, Pregones Theater, the Lark Play Development Center, The Flea Theater, Naked Angels, The Public Theater and Rattlestick Playwrights Theater. Coppel's work has won the Asuncion Queer Latino Festival at Pregones Theater, NYU's John Holden Award for Playwriting, the 2012 HOLA Award for Outstanding Achievement in Playwriting, and the 2012 Helen Merrill Award.

Atlantic Theater Company produced Coppel's play Chimichangas and Zoloft in 2012, marking the first New York production of her work.

Coppel, along with Halley Feiffer and Benjamin Scheuer received the inaugural commissions for Williamstown Theatre Festival's New Play Commissioning Program in 2015.

Second Stage Theatre produced the premier of King Liz in 2015. King Liz is about sports agent Liz Rico who in order to take over the agency she helped build, must make a career for a volatile basketball superstar. Coppel, a lifelong fan of the NBA, explores the challenges of being a woman of color in a male-dominated workforce and the price that comes with success. King Liz was included on The Kilroy's list of "most recommended un- and underproduced new plays by female and trans authors" in 2015.
