= M. A. Fortin =

Canadian screenwriter and producer

- Born: Mark Alexandre Fortin; August 11, 1978 (age 48); Montreal, Quebec, Canada
- Education: Emerson College (BFA); Harvard University (MFA)
- Occupations: Screenwriter producer
- Years active: 2014–present
- Partner: Joshua John Miller (2013–present)

Mark Alexandre Fortin (born August 11, 1978) is a Canadian screenwriter and producer. In tandem with Joshua John Miller, he has written the screenplay for the 2015 horror comedy The Final Girls, and the pilot of the USA Network drama series Queen of the South.

== Personal life ==
Fortin was born in Montreal, Quebec, and raised in Oakville, Ontario. He is an alumnus of Emerson College, from which he received his Bachelor of Fine Arts in 2000. He graduated with a Master of Fine Arts from the American Repertory Theater / Moscow Art Theatre Institute for Advanced Theater Training at Harvard University. He is gay, and as of 2013 is in a relationship with fellow screenwriter Joshua John Miller.

== Career ==
Fortin frequently co-writes with Joshua John Miller. Their first collaboration was on the short film Dawn, which was directed by actress Rose McGowan. The short premiered at the 2014 Sundance Film Festival. The two then wrote and executive produced the horror comedy film The Final Girls, which was directed by Todd Strauss-Schulson and stars Taissa Farmiga and Malin Åkerman. The film had its world premiere at South by Southwest on March 13, 2015, and was given a limited release in the United States on October 9, 2015.

Fortin and Miller wrote the pilot of the USA Network drama series Queen of the South, which premiered on June 23, 2016, and for which they also serve as executive producers.

== Filmography ==
- Dawn (2014; short film)
- The Final Girls (2015; also executive producer)
- Queen of the South (2016–2021; also executive producer)
- The Exorcism (2024)
