= The Queen of the South (novel) =

2002 novel by Arturo Pérez-Reverte

- Author: Arturo Pérez-Reverte
- Original title: La reina del sur
- Translator: Andrew Hurley
- Language: Spanish
- Publisher: Alfaguara
- Publication date: 2002
- Publication place: Spain
- English publication date: 7 June 2004
- Pages: 542
- ISBN: 9788420464350

The Queen of the South (Spanish: La reina del sur) is a 2002 novel by the Spanish writer Arturo Pérez-Reverte. It is about a Mexican woman, Teresa Mendoza, who ends up as an international drug lord.

Telemundo produced a Spanish-language television series of the same name, based on the novel. With a budget of 10 million US dollars, it was Telemundo's most expensive TV series at the time of its premiere in 2011. The second season was launched in April 2019. USA Network made an English-language adaptation for television, Queen of the South (2016–2021).
