= La Reina del Sur (TV series) =

Television series

- Genre: Telenovela
- Created by: Roberto Stopello
- Based on: La Reina del Sur by Arturo Pérez-Reverte
- Written by: Juan Marcos Blanco; Valentina Párraga; José Miguel Núñez; Miguel Ferrari; Christian Jiménez; Lina Uribe; Darío Vanegas; Tatiana Andrade
- Story by: Arturo Pérez-Reverte
- Directed by: Mauricio Cruz; Walter Doehner; Carlos Bolado; Carlos Mario Urrea; Claudia Pedraza; Carlos Villegas; Diego Rendón
- Creative director: Gabriela Monroy
- Narrated by: Kate del Castillo
- Theme music composer: Bello Jaime Teodoro
- Opening theme: "La Reina del Sur" performed by Los Cuates de Sinaloa (Season 1); "La Reina del Sur Regresa" performed by Los Cuates de Sinaloa (Season 2); "Título Principal - La Reina del Sur 3" by Carlos Rafael Rivera and the Miami Symphony Orchestra (Season 3)
- Country of origin: United States
- Original languages: Spanish; English
- No. of seasons: 3
- No. of episodes: 183 (list of episodes)

Production
- Executive producers: Patricio Wills; Marcos Santana; Rodrigo Guerrero; Martha Godoy; Kate del Castillo; Rodrigo Guerrero; Ximena Cantuarias
- Producer: Ángel Ossorio
- Cinematography: Alejandro García W.
- Editors: Perla Martínez; Alba Merchan Hamann; Hader Antivar Duque; Sam Baixauli; Gerson Aguilar; Pablo Escalera
- Camera setup: Multi-camera
- Running time: 35 minutes
- Production companies: Antena 3 Televisión (Season 1); Telemundo Studios (Season 1); RTI Producciones (Season 1); Telemundo Global Studios (Seasons 2–3); Netflix (Seasons 2–3)

Original release
- Network: Telemundo
- Release: 28 February 2011 – 16 January 2023

Related
- Queen of the South

La Reina del Sur (lit. 'The Queen of the South') is a Spanish-language telenovela based on a novel of the same name by Spanish author Arturo Pérez-Reverte. It premiered on 28 February 2011. The first season is produced by the American television network Telemundo in conjunction with the Antena 3 network and RTI Producciones, while the second and third seasons are co-produced by Telemundo Global Studios and Netflix. The series depicts the rise of Teresa Mendoza (Kate del Castillo), a young woman from Mexico who becomes the most powerful drug trafficker in southern Spain.

With a $10 million budget it is the second most expensive telenovela ever produced by Telemundo, the first being El Señor de los Cielos. An English language remake, Queen of the South, premiered in June 2016 on USA Network, starring Alice Braga.

The series has been renewed for a second season that premiered on 22 April 2019. On 16 July 2020, Telemundo renewed the series for a third season. The third season aired from 18 October 2022 to 16 January 2023. In May 2026, the series was renewed for a fourth season.

== Synopsis ==
=== Season 1 (2011) ===
The series is the television adaptation of the literary work of the same name of Spanish author Arturo Pérez-Reverte. It is the chronicle of the rise to power of a Mexican woman within the world of international drug trafficking. Teresa Mendoza begins her adventure as a humble young woman in love with a pilot employed by the Mexican cartels. When they execute her boyfriend, Teresa flees, desperate to avoid the same fate. Her escape takes her to the south of Spain where she tries to start a new life. However, she is once again immersed in the world of narcotics trafficking, and for a second time, she suffers the death of a beloved man. After several blows, Teresa decides to take the reins of her destiny and becomes the head of her own organization. This is done with the help of a woman she meets in prison, who decides to share her fortune with Teresa. Through strategic alliances and a strong sense for business, Teresa "La Mexicana" begins to control an intercontinental drug distribution business. However, her great success is accompanied by a high personal price, and Teresa's happiness and heart are tested.

=== Season 2 (2019) ===
The second season of La Reina del Sur follows the life of Teresa Mendoza eight years after the events of the first-season finale. Isolating herself from the rest of the world, Teresa now lives an idyllic life in Italian Tuscany, but the kidnapping of her daughter forces her to go back to the underworld and reintroduces herself into drug trafficking. To save her daughter, Teresa needs to confront her old enemies once more and face her past that she had tried to leave behind.

=== Season 3 (2022–23) ===
After four years in prison in the United States for the deaths of three DEA agents, Teresa Mendoza escapes but will have to face a world full of conspiracy, risking her life in order to clear her name and reunite with her daughter Sofía.

== Episodes ==
Season	Episodes	Originally released	
Season	Episodes	First released	Last released
1	63	28 February 2011	30 May 2011
2	60	22 April 2019	29 July 2019
Special	12	27 April 2019	26 July 2019
3	60	18 October 2022	16 January 2023

== Cast ==
=== Main ===
- Kate del Castillo as Teresa Mendoza
- Humberto Zurita as Epifanio Vargas
- Rafael Amaya as Raimundo Dávila Parra "El Güero" (season 1)
- Iván Sánchez as Santiago López Fisterra "El Gallego" (season 1)
- Cristina Urgel as Patricia O'Farrell (season 1)
- Alberto Jiménez as Oleg Yasikov (season 1)
- Miguel de Miguel as Teo Aljarafe (season 1; guest season 2)
- Gabriel Porras as Roberto Márquez "El Gato Fierros" (season 1)
- Salvador Zerboni as Ramiro Vargas "El Ratas" (season 1)
- Nacho Fresneda as Dris Larbi (season 1)
- Mónica Estarreado as Fátima Mansur (season 1)
- Alejandro Calva as César Güemes "Batman"
- Cuca Escribano as Sheila
- Dagoberto Gama as Potequim Gálvez "El Pote" (season 1)
- Christian Tappan as Willy Rangel (seasons 1–2)
- Eduardo Velasco as Coronel Abdelkader Chaib (seasons 1–2)
- Alfonso Vallejo as Manolo Céspedes (season 1)
- Pablo Castañón as Lalo Veiga (season 1)
- Miguel Ángel Blanco as Siso Pernas (seasons 1–2)
- Lorena Santos as Soraya (season 1)
- Sara Maldonado as Verónica Cortés / Guadalupe Romero (season 1)
- Carmen Navarro as Marcela "La Conejo" (seasons 1–2)
- Santiago Meléndez as Saturnino "Nino" Juárez (season 1)
- Juan José Arjona as Pablo Flores (seasons 1–2)
- Raoul Bova as Francesco Belmondo "Lupo" (season 2)
- Paola Núñez as Manuela Cortés (season 2)
- Mark Tacher as Alejandro Alcalá (season 2)
- Flavio Medina as Zurdo Villa (season 2)
- Luisa Gavasa as Cayetana Segovia de Aljarafe (season 2)
- Antonio Gil as Oleg Yasikov (seasons 2–3)
- Kika Edgar as Genoveva Alcalá (seasons 2–3)
- Lincoln Palomeque as Faustino Sánchez Godoy (seasons 2–3; guest season 1)
- Patricia Reyes Spíndola as Carmen Martínez (season 2)
- Carmen Flores as Charo (season 2)
- Emmanuel Orenday as Danilo Márquez (seasons 2–3)
- Alejandro Speitzer as Ray Dávila (season 2)
- Tiago Correa as Jonathan Peres (season 2; recurring season 3)
- Sara Vidorreta as Rocío Aljarafe (season 2; recurring season 3)
- Ágata Clares as Paloma Aljarafe (seasons 2–3)
- Abdelali El Aziz as Ahmed (season 2; guest season 1)
- Isabella Sierra as Sofía Mendoza (seasons 2–3)
- Pêpê Rapazote as Pablo Landero (seasons 3)
- Ed Trucco as Ernie Palmero (seasons 3)
- Horacio Garcia Rojas as Charlie Velazquez (seasons 3)
- Beth Chamberlin as Jane Kozar (seasons 3)
- Sofia Lama as Susana Guzmán (seasons 3)

=== Recurring and guest stars ===
- Karim El-Kerem as Mohamed Mansur (season 1)
- Klaus as Eddie Álvarez (season 1)
- Nerea Garmendia as Eugenia Montijo (season 1)
- Juan Pablo Raba as Jaime Gutiérrez Solana (season 1)
- Ezequiel Montalt as Jaime "Jimmy" Arenas (season 1)
- Rodolfo Valdés as El Chino Parra (season 1)
- Jesús Castro as Jesús (season 2)
- Pol Monen as Juan (season 2)
- Eduardo Yáñez as Antonio Alcalá (seasons 2–3)
- Aitor Luna as Pedro (season 2)
- Eduardo Santamarina as Mariano Bravo (season 2)
- Eric Roberts as Erick Sheldon (season 2)
- María Camila Giraldo as Jimena Montes (season 2)
- Vera Mercado as Virginia Vargas (season 2)
- Norma Angélica as Morgana (season 2)
- Eduardo Pérez as Sergio (season 2)
- Dimitry Anisimov as Anton (season 2)
- Aroha Hafez as Triana (season 2)
- Anna Ciocchetti as Marietta Lancaster (season 2)
- Roberto Abraham Wohlmuth as Lencho (season 2)
- Daniel Martínez as Senator (season 3)
- Carlos Valencia as Montaño (season 3)
- Arturo Ríos as Delio Jurado (season 3)
- Dmitry Anisimov as Anton Potapushin (season 3)
- Denia Agalianou as Vanessa (season 3)
- Anderley Palomino as Mateo Mena (season 3)
- Noé Hernández as General Carlos Garrido (season 3)

== Remake ==
An English language remake, titled Queen of the South, premiered in June 2016 on USA Network, starring Alice Braga.

== Ratings ==
Viewership and ratings per season of La Reina del Sur
Season	Timeslot (ET)	Episodes	First aired		Last aired		Avg. viewers (millions)
Season	Timeslot (ET)	Episodes	Date	Viewers (millions)	Date	Viewers (millions)	Avg. viewers (millions)
1	Mon–Fri 10:00 p.m.	63	28 February 2011	2.4	30 May 2011	4.2	TBD
2	Mon–Fri 10:00 p.m.	60	22 April 2019	2.36	29 July 2019	2.23	1.89
3	Mon–Fri 9:00 p.m.	60	18 October 2022	1.21	16 January 2023	1.10	0.93

== Awards and nominations ==
Year	Award	Category	Nominated	Result	Ref
2011	People in Spanish Awards	Best Telenovela	Roberto Stopello	Won	
2011	People in Spanish Awards	Best Actress	Kate del Castillo	Won	
2011	People in Spanish Awards	Best Supporting Actor	Humberto Zurita	Nominated	
2011	People in Spanish Awards	Best Supporting Actor	Rafael Amaya	Nominated	
2011	People in Spanish Awards	Best Villain	Salvador Zerboni	Nominated	
2011	People in Spanish Awards	Newcomer of the Year	Cristina Urgel	Won	
2011	People in Spanish Awards	Newcomer of the Year	Iván Sánchez	Nominated	
2011	People in Spanish Awards	Sweethearts	Kate del Castillo & Iván Sánchez	Nominated	
2012	TVyNovelas Awards Colombia	Best Series	Roberto Stopello	Nominated	
2012	TVyNovelas Awards Colombia	Favorite Production	Roberto Stopello	Nominated	
2012	TVyNovelas Awards Colombia	Best Villain Of Series	Humberto Zurita	Nominated	
2012	1st Your World Awards	Novela of the Year	Roberto Stopello	Nominated	
2012	1st Your World Awards	Favorite Lead Actress	Kate del Castillo	Nominated	
2012	1st Your World Awards	Best Bad Luck Video	Amor que mata	Nominated	
2020	International Emmy Award	Best Non-English Language U.S. Primetime Program	La Reina del Sur	Won	
2023	Produ Awards	Best Superseries	La Reina del Sur	Won	
2023	Produ Awards	Best Lead Actress - Superseries or Telenovela	Kate del Castillo	Won	
2023	Produ Awards	Best Directing - Superseries or Telenovela	Carlos Villegas, Claudia Pedraza and Carlos Bolado	Won	

== Source material ==
Arturo Pérez-Reverte, author of the novel, The Queen of the South, has said that a great source of inspiration for his novel were Mexican drug ballads, country-polka songs that tell the stories about real life Mexican drug lords.

One of the real life characters that inspired the novel is Sandra Ávila Beltrán, known as the Queen of the Pacific, famous for being one of the first female drug traffickers to reach the level of "Boss" in the Mexican cartels, a place usually reserved for men.
