= Jacquelyne Jackson =

American sociologist (1932–2004)

Jacquelyne Johnson Jackson
- Born: February 24, 1932; Winston-Salem, North Carolina, U.S.
- Died: January 28, 2004 (aged 71); Stilwell, Kansas, U.S.
- Occupations: Sociologist; educator; researcher

Jacquelyne Mary Johnson Jackson (February 24, 1932 – January 28, 2004) was an American sociologist, educator, and researcher on issues that affect elderly minority populations. She was involved in public policy debates on programs for this group for over 30 years. From 1978, she started a dialogue on social security accessibility for elderly minorities in consideration of sociological influence.

== Early life and education ==
Jacquelyne Mary Johnson and her fraternal twin sister, Jeanne Naomi Johnson were born on February 24, 1932, in Winston-Salem, North Carolina. Her parents were James and Beulah Johnson. Jacquelyne was raised in Tuskegee, Alabama.

Jackson started her career when she witnessed an elderly couple that was forced to sell their home in order to have money for medical care, since there was no Medicare or Medicaid at the time. The couple was forced into public housing as a result. The result of the couple losing their home and life savings drove Jackson to pursue a career addressing the issues of elderly minorities as well as public service law and civil rights issues. Jackson attended Hampton Institute in 1950 for two years and pledged Delta Sigma Theta sorority there and then transferred to Wisconsin. Initially intending on being a lawyer she was influenced by two key professors at Wisconsin and later at Ohio State. She was awarded a Bachelor of Science degree in Sociology from the University of Wisconsin–Madison in 1953. She received her Master's of Science in sociology from the same university in 1955. At Ohio State University she received her Doctorate in Sociology in 1960.

== Career and research ==
She started her post-doctoral work in 1961 at the University of Colorado-Boulder. As a part of her academic career, she did post-doctoral work at Duke University becoming the second Black professor and first Black female professor, after the first Black professor Dr. Samuel Dubois Cook, from 1966 to 1968 and the University of North Carolina-Chapel Hill in the years 1977–78.

From 1959 to 1962, Jackson served as an assistant professor and associate professor at Southern University-Baton Rouge. In 1962 she left to work as a professor at the primarily black Jackson State College until 1964. At that time, she moved to work at Howard University, one of the nation's leading historically black universities in the United States. She joined the Duke University staff in 1966, where she worked as an Instructor and associate professor of Medical Sociology. From 1969 onward, she worked as a visiting professor at St. Augustine's College. She also worked as a professor at Howard University from 1978 to 1985.

In an interview on April 14, 1998, Jackson said her most important work is in the field of ethno-gerontology. She stresses that this field should not confused with social work. She also stated the main task of her work is to "...keep pace with changes and identify characteristics and causes and address public policy to modify programs." Jackson's research and writings cover the older black population in the United States. Her analyses measured the intra-variations within this population itself instead of comparing it to other populations. Jackson has researched the variations in gender, age, and ethnicity within the black community. Unlike other similar types of research, Jackson accounted for discrimination against blacks. During the 1960s, some of her work compared populations based on segregation.

Jackson contributed to more than 80 scholarly journals, and has also published two books: These Rights They Seek in 1962 (her PhD dissertation which focused on her participant observer work in the civil rights activities of the Tuskegee Civic Association, Montgomery Improvement Association and the Birmingham Civil Rights Movement in the 1950s and early 1960s) and Minorities and Aging in 1980. In her scholarship, Jackson has addressed race-based affirmative action, the bell curve, and the Anita Hill/Clarence Thomas controversy of 1991. She co-authored or published as executive editor many other scholarly works. Jackson also ran political campaigns for Durham Mayor Bill Bell when he ran for City Council and worked with the Federation on American Immigration Reform (FAIR) in the early 1980s.

Jackson served as the president of the Association of Social and Behavioral Scientists and chair of the Caucus of Black Sociologists. Jackson has been a member of the board of directors of the Carver Research Foundation at Tuskegee University. She served as the director of the National Council on Black Aging. She held memberships in the American Sociologist Association, Southern Sociological Society, Gerontological Society of America, and the National Council on Family Relations. Since 1959, she has also been a member of the Tuskegee, Alabama, Civic Association.

== Personal life ==
She was married to Murphy Jackson, and they had one child.

Jackson retired in 1998 and moved to Kansas to be closer to her daughter's family and to her twin sister, Jeanne, who resided in Topeka, Kansas. She died on January 28, 2004, of pancreatic cancer, in Stilwell, Kansas.

== Awards and honors ==
Jackson earned multiple fellowships, including being named the John Hay Whitney Fellow of 1957–59, a National Science Foundation Fellow beginning in 1959, and National Institutes of Health Fellow 1966–1968 and 1977–1978. She has also received awards from the American Psychiatric Association, the American Society of Black Sociologists, and Ohio State University. She appeared numerous times before Congress as well as on the popular PBS show The Constitution: That Delicate Balance, featuring Fred W. Friendly and guest legal scholars and experts.

== Selected writings ==
=== Books ===
- These Rights They Seek. Public Affairs Press, 1962.
- Minorities and Aging. Wadsworth Publishing Co., 1980.

=== Periodicals ===
- Jackson, Jacquelyne J. (March 1972). "Where Are the Black Men?". Ebony. Vol. 27, no. 5. pp. 99–102.
- "Aging Black Women and Public Policies," The Black Scholar, (May/June 1988)
- "Them Against Us: Anita Hill v. Clarence Thomas," The Black Scholar, (Winter 1991/Spring 1992)
- "Race-based Affirmative Action: mend it or end it?" The Black Scholar, (Summer 1995.)
- "The Bell Curve: what's all the fuss about?" The Black Scholar, (Winter 1995)
- "The Bell Curve (Book Review) intelligence and class structure in American Life," The Black Scholar, (Winter 1995) "But Where Are the Men?" - Ebony 1972 (also featured in Black Scholar)
