= A Date with Judy =

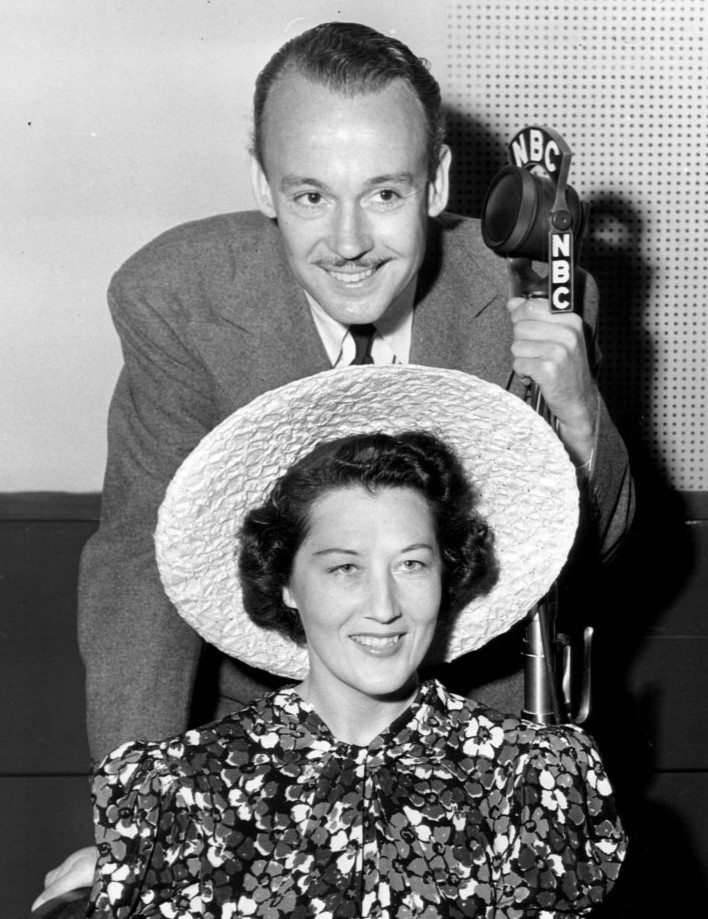
- Paul McGrath and Margaret Brayton portrayed Judy's parents, Melvin and Dora Foster.
- Genre: Teenage situation comedy
- Running time: 30 minutes
- Country of origin: United States
- Language: English
- Syndicates: NBC; ABC
- TV adaptations: A Date with Judy
- Starring: Ann Gillis; Paul McGrath; Margaret Brayton; Dellie Ellis; Stanley Farrar; Louise Erickson; Joseph Kearns; John Brown; Bea Benaderet; Georgia Backus; Lois Corbet; Myra Marsh
- Announcer: Ken Niles, Art Baker
- Created by: Aleen Leslie and Jerome Lawrence
- Written by: Aleen Leslie
- Directed by: Tom McAvity, Helen Mack
- Produced by: Tom McAvity, Helen Mack
- Original release: June 24, 1941 – May 4, 1950

A Date with Judy is a comedy radio series aimed at a teenage audience which ran from 1941 to 1950.

== Radio series ==
The series was co-created by Jerome Lawrence and Aleen Leslie, and based on Leslie's “One Girl Chorus” column in the The Pittsburgh Press. Lawrence left the show in 1943.

The show began as a summer replacement for Bob Hope's show, sponsored by Pepsodent and airing on NBC from June 24 to September 16, 1941, with 14-year-old Ann Gillis in the title role. Mercedes McCambridge played Judy's girl friend. Dellie Ellis (later known as Joan Lorring) portrayed Judy Foster when the series returned the next summer (June 23 – September 15, 1942).

Louise Erickson, then 15, took over the role the following summer (June 30 – September 22, 1943) when the series, with Bristol Myers as its new sponsor, replaced The Eddie Cantor Show for the summer. Louise Erickson continued in the role of Judy over the next seven years as the series, sponsored by Tums, aired from January 18, 1944, to January 4, 1949. Ford Motors and Revere Cameras were the sponsors for the final season of the radio series on ABC from October 13, 1949, to May 4, 1950. Richard Crenna costarred on the series.

The series was so popular CBS developed a rival program Meet Corliss Archer featuring Janet Waldo, which also enjoyed a long run and proved to be equally successful.

== Film and television ==
As the popularity of the radio series peaked, Jane Powell starred as Judy in the 1948 Metro-Goldwyn-Mayer film A Date with Judy. Wallace Beery, Elizabeth Taylor, Robert Stack, and Carmen Miranda also headed the cast.

A television version of the show ran on ABC on Saturdays during daytime hours beginning on June 2, 1951. It originally starred Pat Crowley as Judy. The series moved to prime time during the summer of 1952 and was brought back again midway through the 1952–53 season. The series ended its run on September 30, 1953. This version featured Mary Linn Beller as Judy, John Gibson and Flora Campbell as her parents, Peter Avramo as her brother, and Jimmy Sommer as her sort-of boyfriend Oogie.

== Comic book ==
A Date with Judy also had a long run as a comic book based on the radio and TV series. It was published by National Comics Publications from October–November 1947 to October–November 1960. There were 79 issues.
