= Telemeter (disambiguation) =

Telemeter is a device for automatic collection and transmission of data.

It may also refer to:

- Rangefinding telemeter, a device that measures distances remotely
- Telemeter (pay television), a former pay TV service
