= Ann Crowley (singer) =

American singer (1929–2023)

- Born: October 17, 1929; Scranton, Pennsylvania, U.S.
- Died: April 24, 2023 (aged 93)
- Occupations: Singer; actress
- Years active: 1944–1955
- Spouses: Stephen Noland Jones (m. 1955; died 2003); Jim Simpson (m. 2006; died 2016)
- Children: 5
- Relatives: Pat Crowley (sister); Fred W. Friendly (father-in-law); Andy Friendly (brother-in-law); David T. Friendly (brother-in-law); Michael Mark (brother-in-law); Priscilla Nedd-Friendly (sister-in-law)

Ann Crowley (October 17, 1929 – April 24, 2023) was an American singer and actress known mostly for her work on Broadway, where, after briefly playing Laurey in Oklahoma! while still a high-school student, she played the leading role of Jennifer in Paint Your Wagon and originated the starring role of Lola in Seventeen. She occasionally also appeared on television. Crowley married and retired from the stage in 1955.

== Early years ==
Crowley was born October 17, 1929, in Olyphant, Pennsylvania, the daughter of Vincent and Helen M. Crowley. Her father was a foreman in a coal mine. She auditioned with vocal coach Frank La Forge in 1944 and "made a deep impression" on him, after which the Koch-Conley Post, American Legion, in Scranton awarded her $200 for vocal training with plans to continue sponsoring her. A singing scholarship took her to New York City to study at Julia Richman High School, from which she graduated in 1947. She was the sister of actress Pat Crowley.

== Career ==
As early as 1944, Crowley was singing in clubs at hotels. An audition with the Theatre Guild in 1945 led to her becoming a member of the cast of Oklahoma! on Broadway. On September 1, 1946, she was designated the understudy for Betty Jane Watson, who portrayed Laurey. When Watson had laryngitis on October 4, 1946, Crowley took her place in the show's matinee and evening presentations. Her performances gained attention, including a feature article in the next day's issue of The New York Times. Crowley's other Broadway credits included Carousel (1945), for which she won a 1947 Theatre World Award as a replacement player, and the starring roles of Jennifer in Paint Your Wagon (1951) and Lola in Seventeen (1952), which she originated. She portrayed Laurey in a production of Oklahoma! in London in 1948. The musical ran for five months, and Crowley's performances were interrupted by surgery for appendicitis. She also toured in the US as Laurey and also as Carrie Pipperidge in Carousel (1947). Her regional theatre roles included Looloo Martin in a 1950 production of Hit the Deck at St. John Terrell's Music Circus in Lambertville, New Jersey.

Her work on television included "Cinderella '53", a one-hour musical broadcast on Studio One on December 21, 1953, as well as Schlitz Playhouse and Musical Comedy Time. In May 1955, Crowley headed the entertainment program in the Statler Terrace Room in Los Angeles.

== Lawsuit ==
Crowley's accomplishments as an entertainer led to her and her parents' being the subject of legal action. Her cousin, Florence M. Sheehan, filed suit for $125,000 damages in Supreme Court in New York on May 5, 1948, saying that those three people had failed to comply with an agreement to pay Sheehan 10 percent of Crowley's wages for five years. The filing said that Sheehan, a milliner, used her contacts in the entertainment industry to help Crowley advance in her career. At one point, it added, Sheehan relinquished her business to spend more time on advancing Crowley's career. The complaint said that Crowley and her parents signed an agreement to pay Sheehan beginning in August 1945 or when Crowley's earnings reached $200 per week after that, but Sheehan had never received any money from them. Sheehan said that she was due $25,000 based on an estimate of $250,000 actual and prospective earnings for Crowley. The lawsuit also sought $50,000 for breach of contract and $50,000 for Sheehan's efforts in launching Crowley's career.

== Personal life and death ==
Crowley married Stephen N. Jones on June 30, 1955, in New York City. They had five children. Crowley left her career, finding that it did not mix with the responsibilities of her home life, although she continued to perform in community theatre. She made her home in the Rockville, Maryland, area for many years and taught songs to patients at a children's hospital once a week.

Jones died in 2003, and in 2006 Crowley married a close family friend, Jim Simpson. He died in 2016. Crowley died on April 24, 2023, at the age of 93.
