= The Constitution: That Delicate Balance =

The Constitution: That Delicate Balance is a television series broadcast originally broadcast in the USA in 1984 on The Learning Channel. Produced by Columbia University as part of its Media & Society Seminars program, the series was filmed in Congress Hall in Philadelphia, Pennsylvania, in 1982-83 as a series of seminars with a group of around 15-20 politicians, journalists, educators and others, including the former President Gerald Ford and the former U.S. Supreme Court Justice Potter Stewart, who also participated in related discussion with the series host Fred Friendly (these discussions took place in Independence Hall).

Others participants included (titles are as at time of broadcast):

- Judge Arlin Adams
- Laurence Barrett
- Judge Robert Bork
- David Broder
- Philip Buchen
- Prof. Archibald Cox
- Lloyd Cutler
- Senator Christopher Dodd (Connecticut)
- US Rep Barney Frank (Massachusetts)
- Senator Orrin Hatch (Utah)
- Justice Irving Kaufman, US Court of Appeals
- Jim Lehrer
- Ann Lewis
- Anthony Lewis
- US Rep Barbara Mikulski (Maryland)
- Bill Moyers
- Former Senator Edmund Muskie
- US Rep Charles B. Rangel (New York)
- Lt General Brent Scowcroft
- Gerry Spence
- James D. St. Clair
- Jack Valenti
- Judge Patricia Wald
- Judge J. Clifford Wallace
- Ben Wattenberg
- Tom Wicker

The filmed material was then edited into hour-long episodes relating to a particular topic. Each episode started with Friendly introducing an issue such as Executive Privilege or The War Powers Act, and went to a seminar discussing the topic. The episode usually finished with Friendly discussing the issue with former Justice Potter Stewart.

== Episodes ==
(episodes titles are not given in credits; titles listed here are as spoken in introduction)

- 01 "Can the President Make a Decision of National Importance Without Consulting the Congress?" (Executive Privilege and Delegation of Powers); moderated by Benno C. Schmidt, Jr., Dean of Columbia Law School
- 02 "Can the President Commit American Troops Without Permission From Congress?" (War Powers and Covert Action); moderated by Benno C. Schmidt, Jr.
- 03 "Is the Way We Elect a President a Disaster Waiting to Happen?" (Presidential Nomination, Election & Succession); moderated by Prof. Arthur R. Miller
- 04 "The Rights of Criminal Defendants versus Safety on Our Streets" (Criminal Justice and a Defendant's Right to a Fair Trial); moderated by Prof. Charles Nesson
- 05 "Does the Insanity Defense Serve to Shield the Guilty Or Does It Work to Protect the Mentally Ill?" (Crime and Insanity); moderated by Prof. Charles Nesson
- 06 "Who Goes to Prison, For How Long and Under What Conditions?" (Crime and Punishments); moderated by Prof. Charles Nesson
- 07 "Does the Cost of Campaigning Corrupt the System?" (Campaign Spending); moderated by Tyrone Brown, a Washington attorney
- 08 "National Security versus Freedom of the Press"; moderated by Benno Schmidt
- 09 "School Prayer, Gun Control & the Right of Extremist Groups to Assemble: Who Decides?"; moderated by Prof. Arthur R. Miller
- 10 "The Sovereign Self: The Right To Live, The Right to Die"; moderated by Prof. Arthur R. Miller
- 11 "Can This Nation of Immigrants Deny Opportunity to the Latest New-Comers: How Many Aliens Can We Absorb?" (Immigration Reform); moderated by Benno C. Schmidt, Jr.
- 12 "Affirmative Action vs Reverse Discrimination"; moderated by Tyrone Brown
- 13 "Can the States, Which Created the Federal Government, Be Forced to Accept Federal Standards for Education?" (Federalism); moderated by Prof. Lewis Kaden

== "The 1787 Constitutional Convention" ==
Although not formally part of the series, a related 2-hour program (also hosted by Friendly), was made in 1987 for the 200th-anniversary of the 1787 Constitutional Convention.
