= Leonard Garment =

American lawyer, public servant and jazz musician (1924-2013)

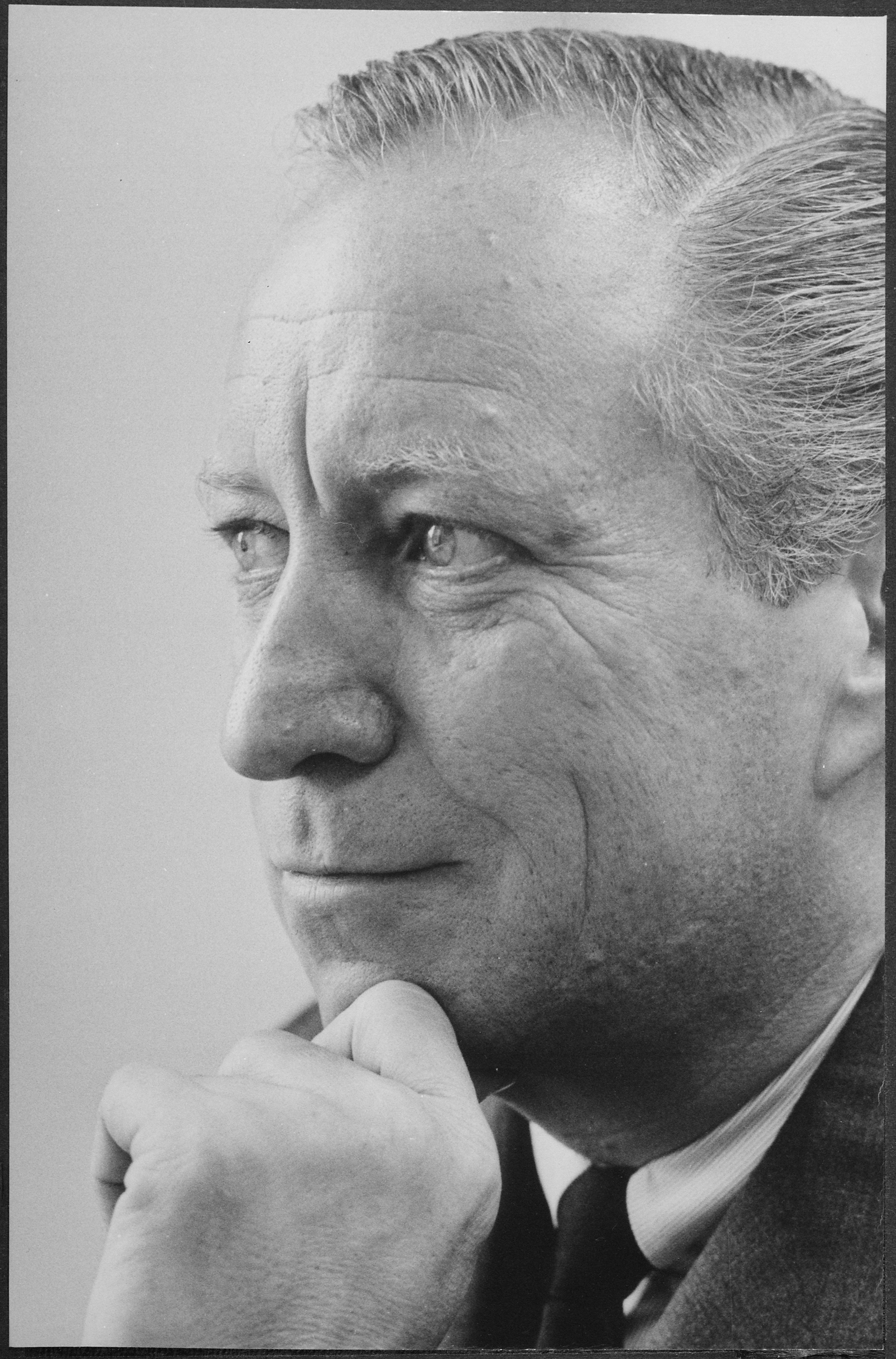

White House Counsel
- In office April 30, 1973 – August 9, 1974
- President: Richard Nixon
- Preceded by: John Dean
- Succeeded by: Philip W. Buchen

Personal details
- Born: May 11, 1924 New York City, U.S.
- Died: July 13, 2013 (aged 89) New York City, U.S.
- Party: Republican
- Spouse(s): Grace Albert (died 1976) Suzanne Garment
- Children: 3
- Education: Brooklyn College (BA); Brooklyn Law School (LLB)

Leonard Garment (May 11, 1924 – July 13, 2013) was an American attorney, public servant, and arts advocate. He served U.S. presidents Richard Nixon and Gerald Ford in the White House in various positions from 1969 to 1976, including Counselor to the President, acting Special Counsel to Nixon for the last two years of his presidency, and U.S. Ambassador to the Third Committee at the United Nations. He played a key role in the Ford pardon of Nixon.

== Early life, family and education ==
Garment was born in Brooklyn, New York City, New York. He had two brothers, Charles and Martin.

After graduating from Brooklyn College, he earned his law degree at Brooklyn Law School in 1949.

Garment was an avid jazz musician, playing both clarinet and saxophone. Before he entered law school, Garment performed as a jazz saxophonist with Woody Herman's band playing with Alan Greenspan.

== Career ==
External videos
- Booknotes interview with Garment on Crazy Rhythm, April 20, 1997, C-SPAN
- Presentation by Garment on In Search of Deep Throat, September 28, 2000, C-SPAN

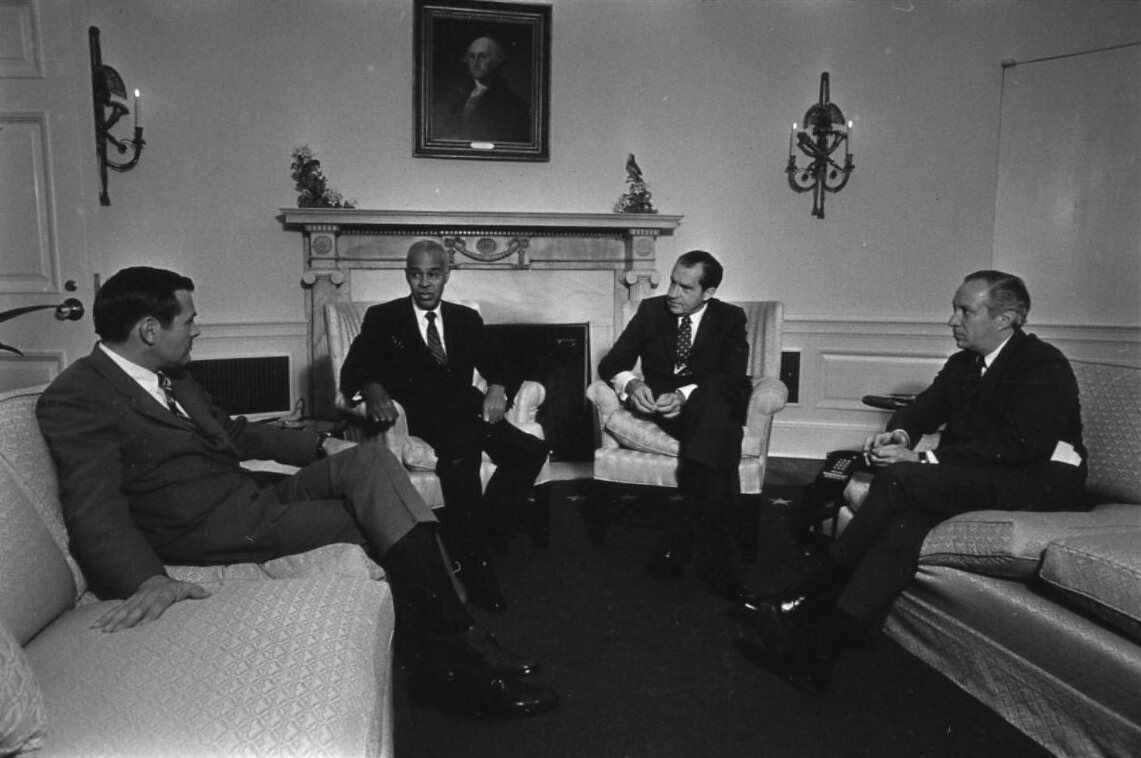
Garment with President Richard Nixon, Donald Rumsfeld, and Roy Wilkins in 1970

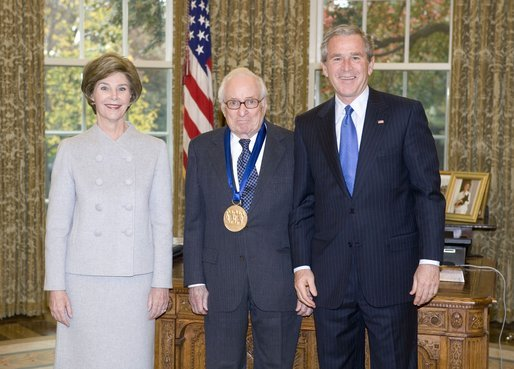
Garment with President George W. Bush and First Lady Laura Bush in 2005

He joined the law firm of Mudge, Stern, Baldwin, and Todd. He became the head of litigation and a partner in the late fifties. Garment met Richard Nixon when the politician joined the firm in 1963. (Later the firm would be called Nixon, Mudge, Rose, Guthrie, Alexander & Mitchell.) He assisted with Nixon's 1968 presidential campaign. In 1969, Garment became a part of Nixon's White House staff as special consultant to the president. He advised the president and worked on various special projects—particularly in the areas of civil and human rights, Indian affairs, and the arts.

Garment was the author of two books: the autobiography Crazy Rhythm: From Brooklyn and Jazz to Nixon's White House, Watergate, and Beyond, and In Search of Deep Throat: The Greatest Political Mystery of Our Time. Published in 2000, the latter book supported the theory that Deep Throat was John Sears. Before Deep Throat's identity was revealed in 2005 as being former FBI Acting Associate Director W. Mark Felt, Garment himself was a suspect.

Felt was listed as a possible Deep Throat in the book (as are many others), but was dismissed by Garment because the author believed the secret source had to have strong White House connections. He was mistaken in his selection of Sears, who told Garment explicitly that he was not Deep Throat. To prove his argument, Sears admitted that he was an anonymous source for Carl Bernstein, but Garment still did not believe Sears, a longtime friend, was being truthful about not being Deep Throat.

When President Nixon's records were subpoenaed in connection to the Watergate investigation, it was Garment who received the subpoena on behalf of Nixon on July 23, 1973 at the Eisenhower Executive Office Building.

Garment unilaterally took steps to press Ford to pardon Nixon. On Aug. 27, 1974, Garment and Nixon speechwriter Raymond Price, also a holdover from the Nixon administration, drafted a memo and pardon announcement for consideration by Ford. Garment speculated that, if a pardon were not quickly offered, "the whole miserable tragedy will be played out to God knows what ugly and wounding conclusion." He also thought the nation would at first recoil, but soon enough welcome the pardon.

According to Bob Woodward in a 2026 memoir, Garment confessed to him that Nixon was a "incorrigible liar whom [he] personally disliked."

== Other pursuits ==
Garment had a long association with the arts. In the 1970s, he was chairman of the board of the Brooklyn Academy of Music. He was one of the founders of the National Jazz Museum in Harlem. He was awarded the National Medal of Arts in 2005 as an arts advocate and patron.

== Personal life ==
Garment was married twice; his first wife died in 1977. His second wife was Suzanne Garment. He had three children, daughter Dr. Ann Garment and a son and daughter who predeceased him.

Journalist Tim Russert credited Leonard Garment with getting him into the news business as Garment had a friend at NBC News who was looking to rebuild their news division. Garment and Russert had previously worked together in 1976 during the US Senate election of Daniel Patrick Moynihan. Garment was a close associate of I. Lewis "Scooter" Libby, as law partners, at Dechert, Price & Rhoads.

Garment died July 13, 2013, at his Manhattan, New York City, home at age 89.

Legal offices
Preceded by John Dean	White House Counsel; 1973–1974	Succeeded by Philip W. Buchen
