= Andy Friendly =

American television producer (1951–2026)

- Born: Andrew Samson Heron Friendly; November 6, 1951; New York City, New York, U.S.
- Died: January 4, 2026 (aged 74); Bel Air, Los Angeles, California, U.S.
- Occupation: Television producer
- Years active: 1973-2026
- Spouse: Pat Crowley (m. 1986; died 2025)
- Relatives: Fred W. Friendly (father); David T. Friendly (brother); Michael Mark (brother); Ann Crowley (sister-in-law); Priscilla Nedd-Friendly (sister-in-law)

Andy Friendly (November 6, 1951 – January 4, 2026) was an American television producer.

== Early life and career ==
Friendly was born in New York City on November 6, 1951, the son of CBS News president Fred Friendly. His brother was producer David T. Friendly.

He was the first producer for Entertainment Tonight, and also worked as an executive at King World and CNBC.

== Personal life and death ==
Friendly was married to actress Pat Crowley. He died at his home in Bel Air, California, on January 4, 2026, at the age of 74.
