= Michael Mark (musician) =

American musician, composer, and actor

- Occupations: Musician; composer; actor
- Years active: 1988-2023
- Relatives: Fred W. Friendly (father); Andy Friendly (brother); David T. Friendly (brother); Pat Crowley (sister-in-law); Ann Crowley (sister-in-law); Priscilla Nedd-Friendly (sister-in-law)

Michael Mark is an American musician, composer, and actor. He won a Drama Desk Award for his performance in the Broadway Musical, I Love My Wife and he was also part of the original cast of Harry Chapin's Cotton Patch Gospel, which he also played for the televised version of the show.

Mark works as a composer for television programs. Probably Mark’s best-known composition is the theme song for the TV show Entertainment Tonight. Currently Mark spends his musical time writing, touring and performing with Tom Chapin, sharing in Grammy Award nominations for Tom’s albums of family music. He recorded a solo album entitled Good To Be Here which was released in 2005. His father is Fred W. Friendly, and his brothers are Andy and David T. Friendly.

On February 12, 2009, he joined the Aaron Copland School of Music at Queens College orchestra and chorus, along with the Riverside Inspirational Choir and NYC Labor Choir, in honoring Abraham Lincoln's 200th birthday at the Riverside Church in New York City. Under the direction of Maurice Peress, they performed Earl Robinson's "The Lonesome Train: A Music Legend for Actors, Folk Singers, Choirs, and Orchestra", in which he played the balladeer.
