= Robert Lipshutz =

American lawyer (1921–2010)

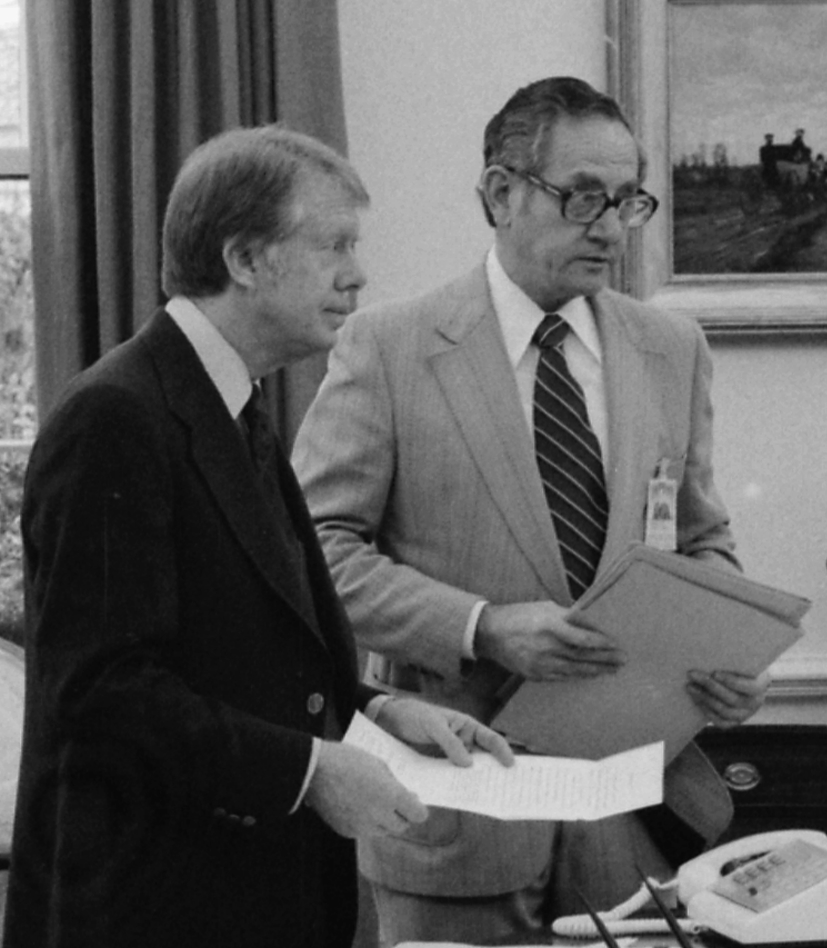
- Lipshutz (right) with President Carter in 1977

White House Counsel
- In office January 20, 1977 – October 1, 1979
- President: Jimmy Carter
- Preceded by: Philip Buchen
- Succeeded by: Lloyd Cutler

Personal details
- Born: December 27, 1921 Atlanta, Georgia, U.S.
- Died: November 6, 2010 (aged 88) Atlanta, Georgia, U.S.
- Party: Democratic
- Education: University of Georgia (BA, JD)

Robert Jerome Lipshutz (December 27, 1921 – November 6, 2010) was an American attorney who served first as the national campaign treasurer for Jimmy Carter's successful 1976 run for the United States Presidency and then as the White House Counsel from 1977 to 1979 during Carter's administration. He played a back channel role in the negotiations between Egypt and Israel that led to the signing of the Camp David Accords in 1978.

== Early life, education, and career ==
Lipshutz was born on December 27, 1921, in Atlanta, Georgia, and attended Boys' High School. He earned his undergraduate degree from the University of Georgia, where he was captain of the debate team, member of the Phi Kappa Literary Society, and was awarded a Juris Doctor degree from the University of Georgia School of Law in 1943. He served in the United States Army during World War II and worked as a lawyer in Atlanta after completing his military service, opening a law office in 1947.

== Association with Carter ==
Lipshutz first met Carter in 1966 when Carter was running an ultimately unsuccessful bid in the Democratic Party primary against Lester Maddox. When Carter ran for governor in 1970 and won the race, he named Lipshutz to serve on the state's Board of Human Resources. He served as Carter's campaign treasurer during the 1976 Presidential Election and was named as White House Counsel after Carter took office, part of the "Georgia Mafia" that followed Carter into his administration.

=== The White House ===
As White House counsel, Lipshutz advised the president to commute the sentence of G. Gordon Liddy, convicted as part of the Watergate scandal, an act that was described as being "in the interest of equity and fairness". He also lobbied on behalf of naming a greater proportion of minorities to positions as judges and in the executive branch. Lipshutz drafted a revised policy regarding affirmative action that was ultimately accepted by the Supreme Court of the United States in its decision in the case Regents of the University of California v. Bakke regarding a race-based admission policy at the UC Davis School of Medicine that the plaintiff claimed cost him a spot at the school in which the court ruled that racial quotas were unacceptable, but that affirmative action was allowed.

=== Key role ===
During the negotiations between Egyptian Anwar El Sadat and of Israeli Prime Minister Menachem Begin at Camp David, Lipshutz provided input from leaders of major Jewish organizations regarding the peace process. In a statement issued by the former president, Carter said that Lipshutz's "insights played a key role in many White House initiatives and decisions" at Camp David and at other points during his presidency, including his part in the drafting of the presidential order that led to the creation of the United States Holocaust Memorial Museum in Washington, D.C. After leaving the White House in October 1979, he was replaced by Lloyd Cutler.

== Later years and death ==
Lipshutz served as a trustee of the Atlanta Jewish Federation and the Union of American Hebrew Congregations, as well as of the Carter Center established by the former president.

A resident of Atlanta, he died at the Atlanta Hospice at the age of 88 on November 6, 2010, due to a pulmonary embolism. He was survived by his second wife, Betty Beck, as well as by three daughters and a son from his first marriage, two stepchildren and nine grandchildren. His first wife had died in 1970.

== See also ==
- List of Jewish American jurists

Legal offices
Preceded by Philip Buchen	White House Counsel; 1977–1979	Succeeded by Lloyd Cutler
