= Mary Linn Beller =

American child actress (1933–2000)

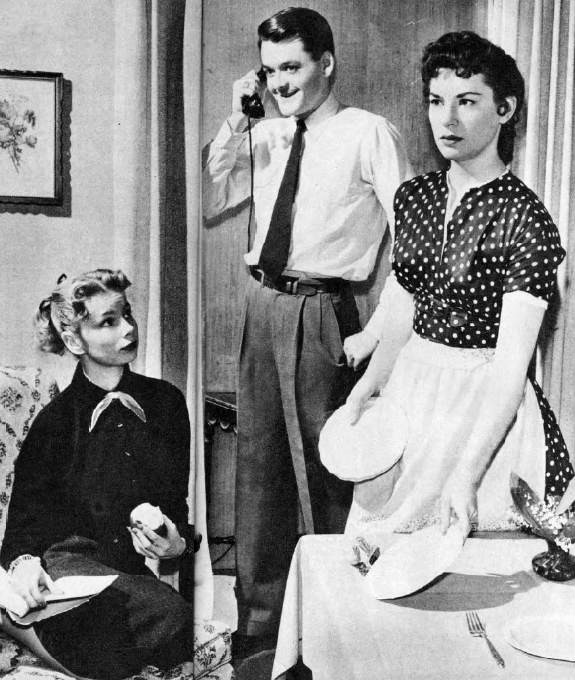
- Mary Linn Beller (left) with Hal Holbrook (middle) and Lois Nettleton (right) in the television series The Brighter Day in 1954
- Born: March 1, 1933; Brooklyn, New York, US
- Died: April 13, 2000 (aged 67); Greenwich, Connecticut, US
- Other name: Lynne Pitofsky
- Education: Bennington College; Columbia University School of General Studies
- Occupation: Actress
- Spouse: Robert L. Pitofsky (m. 1954)

Mary Linn Beller (March 1, 1933 – April 13, 2000) was an American child actress.

== Early years ==
Beller was born in Brooklyn on March 1, 1933, the daughter of Samuel and Helen Beller. She began taking acting lessons by age 9, studying at the Heckscher Foundation and the Neighborhood Playhouse in Manhattan. She began auditioning for parts on radio when she was 12. She attended Midwood High School, Bennington College and Columbia University School of General Studies.

== Career ==
Beller's first professional acting role consisted of a giggle on the radio version of Our Miss Brooks when she was 12 years old. She portrayed Babby on The Brighter Day and appeared on other radio programs, including Let's Pretend and School of the Air.

On stage, Beller performed in summer stock at age 16 in the ingenue lead role in You Can't Take It With You. Other summer stock roles were followed by a six-week tour in Leaf and Bough, which had three performances on Broadway. She also appeared in the Broadway production Have I Got a Girl for You!.

Beller continued her role of Babby on the television version of The Brighter DayI. She also portrayed Judy Foster, the title character on the television version of A Date with Judy and "little sister" Connie Thayer on The First Hundred Years. Other TV programs on which she appeared included Escape, Silver Theatre, and Starlight Theatre.

== Personal life and death ==
Beller married business executive Robert L. Pitofsky in September 1954. Known as Lynne Pitofsky, she died on April 13, 2000, at Greenwich Hospital in Connecticut.
