= Forever Female =

1953 film by Irving Rapper

- Theatrical release poster
- Directed by: Irving Rapper
- Written by: Julius J. Epstein; Philip Epstein
- Based on: Rosalind by J. M. Barrie
- Produced by: Pat Duggan
- Starring: Ginger Rogers; William Holden; Paul Douglas
- Cinematography: Harry Stradling
- Edited by: Archie Marshek
- Music by: Victor Young
- Distributed by: Paramount Pictures
- Release dates: November 28, 1953; (Palm Springs, California)
- Running time: 93 minutes
- Country: United States
- Language: English
- Box office: $1.1 million

Forever Female is a 1953 black and white film directed by Irving Rapper. It stars Ginger Rogers and William Holden. It won a Golden Globe in 1954.

== Plot ==
The reviews are in and a new play starring Beatrice Page and produced by Harry Phillips is a flop. Long divorced but still a team, they need a new project and meet playwright Stanley Krown, who has written one in which the lead roles are a mother and a 19-year-old daughter.

Beatrice wants to play the daughter. She can't pass for 19 but believes she can for 29, so wants the play rewritten. She also displays a romantic interest in Stanley.

A young actress first calling herself Sally Carver and then Peggy Pruitt wants an audition. Stanley has her do some typing on his rewrite, and a jealous Beatrice finds her an acting job out of town. Stanley's play previews in Washington, D.C., and flops. Sally, now calling herself Claudia Souvain, tries to persuade Stanley that the actress is too old for the role.

Seeing the play in a small town with Sally in the lead, now under her real name of Clara Mootz, convinces Stanley that she is right. Beatrice finally concedes that it's time for her to act her age. She agrees to take the mother's part, and on Broadway the play is a huge success.

== Cast ==
- Ginger Rogers as Beatrice Page
- William Holden as Stanley Krown
- Paul Douglas as E. Harry Phillips
- Pat Crowley as Clara Mootz/Sally Carver
- James Gleason as Eddie Woods
- Jesse White as Willie Wolfe
- Marjorie Rambeau as Older Actress at Bar
- George Reeves as George Courtland
- King Donovan as Playwright
- Vic Perrin as Scenic Designer
- Russell Gaige as Theatrical Producer
- Marion Ross as Patty
- Richard Shannon as Stage Manager

== Production ==
The film was originally called Rosalind then Reaching for the Stars.

The role of Clara was meant for Audrey Hepburn. However, she was unavailable and the producer and director were not happy with other girls under contract to Paramount. They saw over 500 actors in New York before settling on Pat Crowley, who made her film debut. At the very end of the film, a clip featuring Pat Crowley is shown with the caption "A future Paramount star".

Rogers later wrote in her memoirs that although she liked the script she felt the studio "spent more money publicizing" Crowley "than they did on the entire production." She respected her co stars William Holden and Paul Douglas as actors but said they would go drinking at lunch and form a tight group that excluded her; "they never spoke to me unless I spoke to them." She added that Rapper "was not my type of director. His behaviour was cold and unfeeling. Because of the attitudes on set, I was unhappy I ever became involved with this film."

Julius Epstein was going to direct the film but tried directing some tests with actors and did not like it.

According to the book "The RKO Gals" (available on archive dot org, 1974, by James Parish p. 227), "Forever Female" was the first feature film to have its premiere on television, it was shown on the Telemeter pay TV system in Palm Springs, and the price to view the movie was $1.35.

== Bibliography ==
- Rogers, Ginger (1991). Ginger : my story. HarperCollins Publishers.
