= David T. Friendly =

American film producer

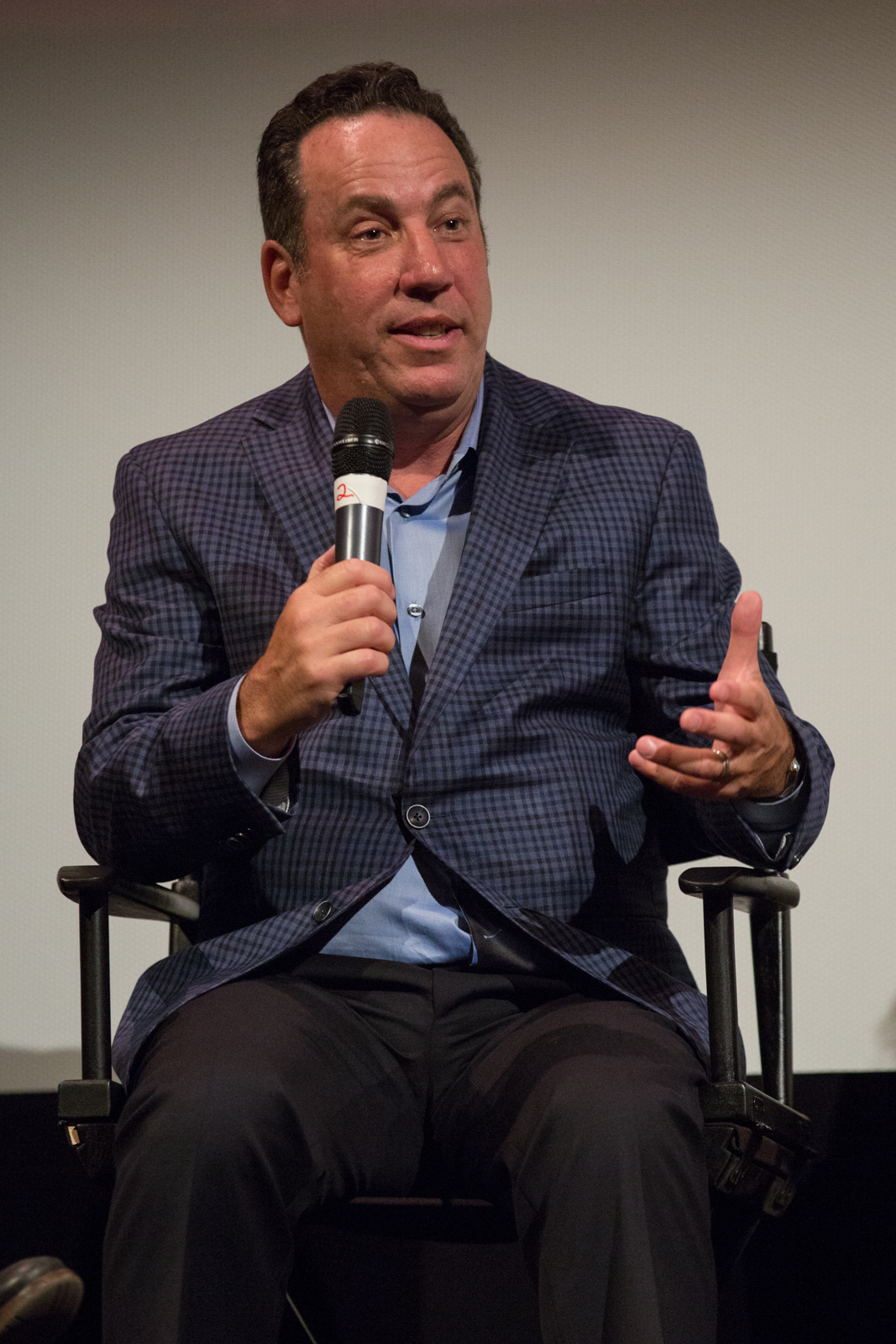
- Friendly at the 2016 ATX Television Festival presentation for Queen of the South
- Born: May 1, 1956 (age 70); New York, U.S.
- Education: Northwestern University (BA)
- Occupation: film producer
- Years active: 1987–present
- Spouse: Priscilla Nedd-Friendly
- Relatives: Fred W. Friendly (father); Andy Friendly (brother); Michael Mark (brother); Pat Crowley (sister-in-law); Ann Crowley (sister-in-law)
- Awards: Independent Spirit Award for Best Film; 2007 Little Miss Sunshine

David T. Friendly (born May 1, 1956) is an American film producer best known for co-producing the 2006 film Little Miss Sunshine, for which he was nominated for an Academy Award for Best Picture.

== Career ==
After graduating from Northwestern University's Medill School of Journalism in 1978, Friendly became a journalist, a staff writer at newsmagazine Newsweek. He moved to the Los Angeles Times in 1985 where he wrote about the entertainment industry and had a weekly column exploring the business side of the film industry until 1987, when he was approached by Imagine Entertainment co-founders Brian Grazer and Ron Howard, and he became Imagine's Vice President of Motion Pictures. With Imagine, he executive produced My Girl, My Girl 2, For Love or Money, Greedy, and The Chamber. In 1994, Friendly joined Davis Entertainment as President, where he produced Daylight and Digging to China, as well as overseeing the development and production of many other Davis films. With his own independent company, Friendly Productions, he has produced the 2000 film Here on Earth. Friendly and producer/financier Marc Turtletaub founded Deep River Productions in September 2000 and, after working at 20th Century Fox for three years where he produced Big Momma's House, they produced their first feature, Laws of Attraction.

Friendly went on to produce Duane Hopwood, The Honeymooners and Big Momma's House 2 with Deep River under different labels before producing the 2006 film Little Miss Sunshine with Turtletaub, Ron Yerxa, Albert Berger and Peter Saraf, for which they were all nominated for an Academy Award for Best Picture and a BAFTA Award for Best Film, as well as winning an Independent Spirit Award for Best Feature and a PGA Award for a Theatrical Motion Picture. After the release of Little Miss Sunshine, which had been in production at Deep River Productions for six years, Friendly and Turtletaub split and left the company to work elsewhere and Friendly made a two-year producing deal with 20th Century Fox that landed him producing roles on the 2008 film Meet Dave and Big Mommas: Like Father, Like Son. He is also set to produce the upcoming projects Office Romance, Q School, and The Warden.

== Personal life ==
Friendly is the son of Jewish American journalist Fred W. Friendly, the president of CBS News from 1964 to 1966 (whom George Clooney portrayed in the 2005 film Good Night, and Good Luck). His brother was producer Andy Friendly. He is married to film editor Priscilla Nedd-Friendly.

== Filmography ==
=== Film ===
Title	Role	Director	Release date	Co-production	Production company	Notes
My Girl	Executive producer	Howard Zieff	November 27, 1991	Imagine Entertainment	Columbia Pictures	
For Love or Money	Executive producer	Barry Sonnenfeld	October 1, 1993	Imagine Entertainment	Universal Pictures	
My Girl 2	Executive producer	Howard Zieff	February 11, 1994	Imagine Entertainment	Columbia Pictures	
Greedy	Executive producer	Jonathan Lynn	March 1, 1994	Imagine Entertainment	Universal Pictures	
Courage Under Fire	Producer	Edward Zwick	July 12, 1996	Davis Entertainment	20th Century Fox	
The Chamber	Executive producer	James Foley	October 11, 1996	Imagine Entertainment	Universal Pictures	
Daylight	Producer	Rob Cohen	December 6, 1996	Davis Entertainment	Universal Pictures	
Out to Sea	Producer	Martha Coolidge	July 2, 1997	Davis Entertainment	20th Century Fox	
Digging to China	Producer	Timothy Hutton	July 16, 1997	Davis Entertainment	Moonstone Entertainment	
Dr. Dolittle	Producer	Betty Thomas	June 26, 1998	Davis Entertainment	20th Century Fox	
Here on Earth	Producer	Mark Piznarski	March 24, 2000		20th Century Fox	
Big Momma's House	Producer	Raja Gosnell	June 2, 2000	Regency Enterprises	20th Century Fox	
Laws of Attraction	Producer	Peter Howitt	April 30, 2004	Mobius Pictures; Intermedia; Deep River Productions; Irish Dreamtime; Initial Entertainment Group	New Line Cinema	
The Honeymooners	Producer	John Schultz	June 10, 2005		Paramount Pictures	
Duane Hopwood	Producer	Matt Mulhern	November 11, 2005	Big Beach	IFC Films	
Big Momma's House 2	Producer	John Whitesell	January 27, 2006	Regency Enterprises	20th Century Fox	
Little Miss Sunshine	Producer	Jonathan Dayton; Valerie Faris	August 18, 2006	Big Beach; Bona Fide Productions; Deep River Productions; Third Gear Productions	Fox Searchlight Pictures	
Meet Dave	Producer	Brian Robbins	July 11, 2008	Regency Enterprises	20th Century Fox	
Soul Men	Producer	Malcolm D. Lee	November 7, 2008	Dimension Films	MGM	
Big Mommas: Like Father, Like Son	Producer	John Whitesell	February 18, 2011	Regency Enterprises	20th Century Fox	
Sneakerheadz	Producer	David T. Friendly; Mick Patridge	August 7, 2015		AT&T Originals	
I.T.	Producer	John Moore	September 23, 2016	Voltage Pictures; Irish Dreamtime; Friendly Films; Fastnet Films; 22h22	RLJ Entertainment	
The First to Do It	Executive Producer	Coocie Simmons; Chike Ozah	February 2018	Diario Films		
Drunk Parents	Executive Producer	Fred Wolf	April 19, 2019	Vertical Entertainment	DirecTV	

=== Television ===
Title	Creator	Role	Start date	Last date	Season	Episode(s)	Production company	Network	Notes
Queen of the South	M.A. Fortin; Joshua John Miller	Executive producer	June 23, 2016	June 9, 2021	5	63	Frequency Films; Friendly Films; Fox 21 Television Studios; Universal Content Productions	USA Network	
