= Gustave W. Buchen =

American politician, educator, and lawyer (1886-1951)

Gustave Buchen

Member of the Wisconsin Senate
- In office 1942–1951

Personal details
- Born: Gustave William Buchen; September 25, 1886 Lyndon, Sheboygan County, Wisconsin, U.S.
- Died: December 3, 1951 (aged 65)
- Party: Republican
- Children: Philip W. Buchen
- Education: University of Wisconsin–Madison (BA, LLB)

Gustave William Buchen (September 25, 1886 – December 3, 1951) was an American politician, educator, and lawyer.

== Early life and education ==
Born in the town of Lyndon in Sheboygan County, Wisconsin, Buchen received his bachelor's degree from the University of Wisconsin–Madison in 1909 and his law degree from the University of Wisconsin Law School in 1912.

== Career ==
From 1909 to 1911, he taught rhetoric and oratory at University of Oregon and public speaking at the University of Wisconsin–Madison in 1911 and 1912. He practiced law in Sheboygan, Wisconsin. He served as a member of the Wisconsin Senate from 1942 to 1951 when he died while still in office. He was a delegate to the 1936 Republican National Convention.

== Personal life ==
Buchen's son, Philip W. Buchen also practiced law and became White House counsel during the presidency of Gerald Ford.
