= Pat Crowley =

American actress (1933–2025)

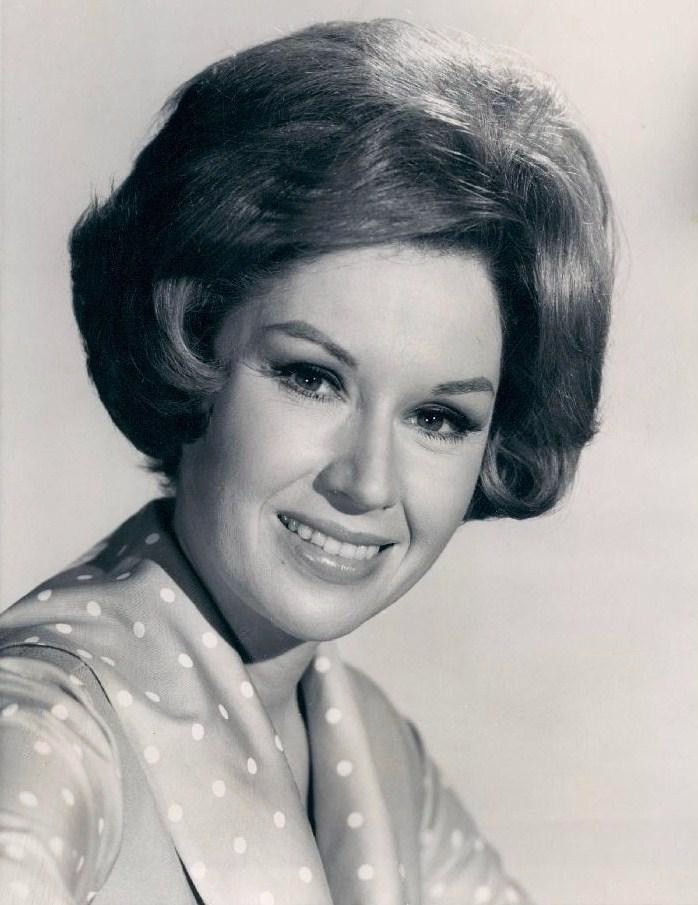
- Crowley in 1965.
- Born: Patricia Margaret Crowley; September 17, 1933; Olyphant, Pennsylvania, U.S.
- Died: September 14, 2025 (aged 91); Los Angeles, California, U.S.
- Occupation: Actress
- Years active: 1950–2012
- Spouses: Ed Hookstratten (m. 1957; div. 1978); Andy Friendly (m. 1986)
- Children: 2
- Relatives: Ann Crowley (sister); Fred W. Friendly (father-in-law); David T. Friendly (brother-in-law); Michael Mark (brother-in-law); Priscilla Nedd-Friendly (sister-in-law)

Patricia Margaret "Pat" Crowley (September 17, 1933 – September 14, 2025) was an American actress.

In 1953, Crowley was awarded the Golden Globe for New Star of the Year for her performances in Forever Female and Money from Home. Throughout the 1950s and 1960s, she had starring roles in films with stars such as Rosemary Clooney, Dean Martin, Jerry Lewis and Tony Curtis. She appeared in television roles starting in the 1950s, continuing through the 2000s.

== Early life ==
Crowley was born on September 17, 1933, in Olyphant, Pennsylvania. Her sister Ann was also an actress.

== Career ==
Crowley played Sally Carver in the film Forever Female (1953), starring Ginger Rogers and William Holden. She starred as Dr. Autumn Claypool alongside Dean Martin and Jerry Lewis in Money from Home (1953), and in their final film together Hollywood or Bust (1956), in which she played Terry Roberts. Her roles in Forever Female and Money from Home brought her the Golden Globe Award for New Star of the Year - Actress. She costarred with Rosemary Clooney in the 1954 musical Red Garters, and with Barbara Stanwyck and Fred MacMurray in the 1956 drama There's Always Tomorrow. She had a starring role opposite Tony Curtis in the boxing drama The Square Jungle (1955) and the Audie Murphy Western Walk the Proud Land, and was also featured in The Wheeler Dealers, a 1963 comedy starring James Garner and Lee Remick.

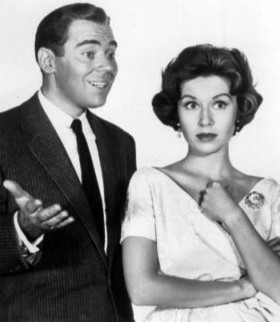
Pat Crowley with Elliott Reid in 1959

Crowley starred as Judy Foster in the daytime version of A Date with Judy on ABC-TV in 1951.

Crowley made guest appearances in many television series in the 1950s and 1960s, including the pilot for The Untouchables, The Lieutenant, Crossroads, The Alfred Hitchcock Hour, Riverboat, The DuPont Show with June Allyson, Rawhide (with Clint Eastwood), Wanted: Dead or Alive (with Steve McQueen), The Eleventh Hour, The Roaring 20s, Cheyenne, Mr. Novak, The Twilight Zone, The Fugitive, 77 Sunset Strip, The Tab Hunter Show, and The Man from U.N.C.L.E.

She appeared as a leading lady for both James Garner and Roger Moore in the same episode of Maverick, titled "The Rivals", a 1958 reworking of Richard Brinsley Sheridan's 1775 comedy of manners play. She was billed in some Maverick episodes as Patricia Crowley and others as Pat Crowley.

She starred from 1965 to 1967 as Joan Nash in the NBC-MGM television sitcom Please Don't Eat the Daisies, based on the 1957 book by Jean Kerr and the 1960 Doris Day/David Niven film of the same name. In 1975–1976, she played Georgia Cameron on the Joe Forrester television series.

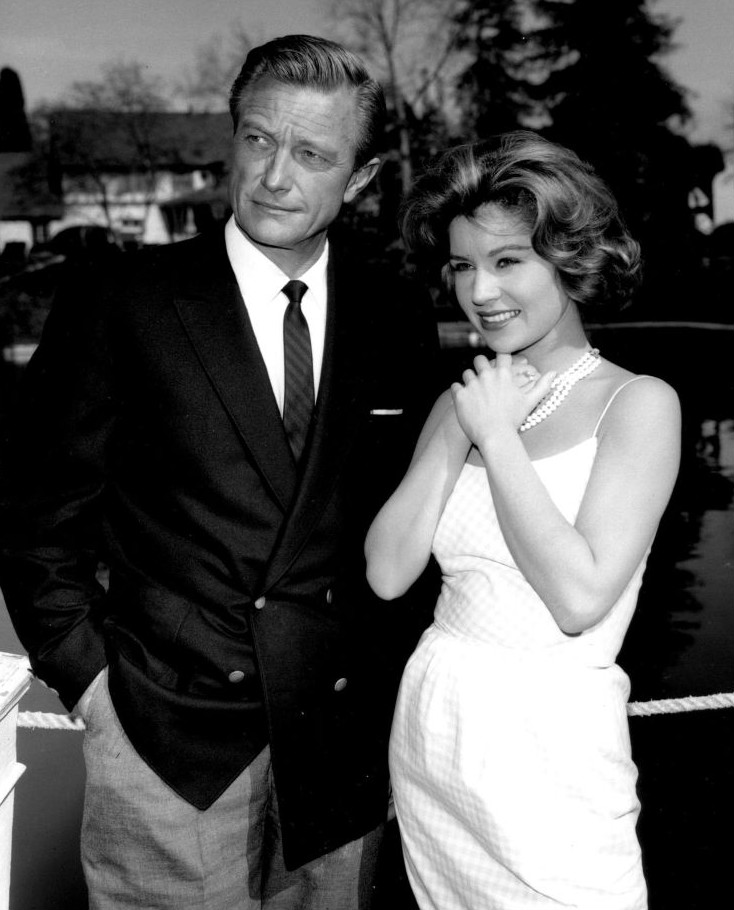
Crowley with Richard Denning in 1961

Crowley sang and danced on The Dean Martin Show. She made guest appearances on episodes of Bonanza (in the episode "The Actress"), Charlie's Angels, Columbo, Police Woman, The Streets of San Francisco, Hawaii 5-0, The Rockford Files, The Feather and Father Gang, Hotel, Quinn Martin's Tales of the Unexpected (in the episode "The Force of Evil") and Murder, She Wrote, as well as the sitcoms Happy Days, The Love Boat, Empty Nest, Roseanne, Frasier and Friends.

She became known to a later era of television viewers for her roles on the serials Generations from 1989–90, Port Charles from 1997 to 2003 and The Bold and the Beautiful in 2005. She appeared as Emily Fallmont on nine episodes of the nighttime soap opera Dynasty in 1986. Crowley portrayed the widow of baseball player Roger Maris in the biopic 61*, directed by Billy Crystal. She appeared in a 2006 episode of The Closer and a 2009 episode of Cold Case.

Throughout her career, she was confused with actress Kathleen Crowley, who guest-starred in many of the same television series during the same time frame (the 1950s and 1960s), though they never appeared together and were not related.

== Personal life ==
On February 2, 1957, Crowley married entertainment lawyer and agent Ed Hookstratten and had 2 children together. The couple divorced in 1978 after more than two decades together. In 1986, Crowley married television producer Andy Friendly whom she remained married until her death. Friendly died nearly four months after her death on January 4, 2026 at the age of 74.

Crowley is a supporter of performing arts education. In 2013, a scholarship fund was established in her name at the University of Southern California's School of Cinematic Arts.

=== Death ===
Crowley died in Los Angeles on September 14, 2025, at the age of 91.

== Filmography ==
=== Film ===
Year	Title	Role	Notes
1953	Forever Female	Clara Mootz/Sally Carver	
1953	Money from Home	Dr. Autumn Claypool	
1954	Red Garters	Susan Martinez De La Cruz	
1955	The Square Jungle	Julie Walsh	
1956	There's Always Tomorrow	Ann	
1956	Walk the Proud Land	Mary Dennison	
1956	Hollywood or Bust	Terry Roberts	A Martin and Lewis comedy
1960	Key Witness	Ann Morrow	
1963	The Wheeler Dealers	Eloise Cott	
1964	To Trap a Spy	Elaine May Bender Donaldson	
1964	Send Me No Flowers	Marge	Uncredited
1972	The Biscuit Eater	Mary Lee McNeil	
2012	Mont Reve	Mrs. Cottington	(final film role)

=== Television ===
Year	Title	Role	Notes
1950	The Chevrolet Tele-Theatre		Season 2 Episode 24: "Three Smart Girls"
1950	Kraft Television Theatre		Season 4 Episode 7: "Sixteen"
1950	The Ford Theatre Hour		Season 3 Episode 7: "Another Darling"
1950–1952	Armstrong Circle Theatre	Wanda	4 episodes
1951	A Date with Judy	Judy Foster	Daytime version
1952	The Web		Season 2 Episode 28: "The Terrible Truth"
1952	Suspense		Season 4 Episode 30: "Night of Evil"
1952–1954	Goodyear Television Playhouse	Miranda	2 episodes
1954	Inner Sanctum	Katherine	Season 1 Episode 10: "Lost in the Dark"
1954	The Philco Television Playhouse	Margie	Season 7 Episode 1: "Middle of the Night"
1954	The United States Steel Hour	Lorna Smith / Evelyn	2 episodes
1954–1956	Lux Video Theatre	Val / Emmadel	2 episodes
1955	The Eddie Cantor Comedy Theatre	Sally Pruitt	Season 1 Episode 2: "Nearly Normal"
1955–1958	General Electric Theater	Hester Hicks / Diana	2 episodes
1956	Climax!	Sue Martin	Season 2 Episode 43: "The 78th Floor"
1956	West Point	Meg	Season 1 Episode 11: "Heat of Anger"
1957	Crossroads		Season 2 Episode 37: "Deadline"
1957	The Frank Sinatra Show	Grace Hatten	Season 1 Episode 8: "A Gun at His Back"
1957–1959	Letter to Loretta	Verna Ellsworth / Helen Morris / Nancy Hodges	3 episodes
1957–1959	Schlitz Playhouse of Stars	June Baker / Mrs. Martin / B.J. Brown	3 episodes
1958	Studio 57		Season 4 Episode 15: "The Terrible Discovery"
1959	The Untouchables	Betty Anderson	Season 1 Episode 0: "Pilot"
1959	Wanted: Dead or Alive	Helen Martin	Season 1 Episode 22: "Competition"
1959	Westinghouse Desilu Playhouse	Betty Anderson	2 episodes
1959	Bronco	Amanda Stover	Season 2 Episode 1: "Game at the Beacon Club"
1959	Maverick	(1) Lydia Lynley (2) Ann Saunders (3) Stephanie Malone	(1) Season 2 Episode 18: "The Rivals" (2) Season 2 Episode 25: "Betrayal" (3) Season 3 Episode 6: "A Tale of Three Cities"
1959	Cheyenne	Jenny Girard	Season 4 Episode 4: "Trial by Conscience"
1959–1960	Goodyear Theatre	Maggie Barrett / Maggie Randall	2 episodes
1959–1963	77 Sunset Strip	Johanna Martin / Doris Devlin	2 episodes
1960	Riverboat	Joan Marchand	Season 1 Episode 16: "Tampico Raid"
1960	The DuPont Show with June Allyson	Sylvia	Season 1 Episode 21: "Threat of Evil"
1960	The Tab Hunter Show	Lila Westbrook	Season 1 Episode 5: "Operation Iceberg"
1960	Hong Kong	Karen Bryant	Season 1 Episode 5: "The Jade Empress"
1960	The Roaring 20's	Mary Lou Weatherbee	Season 1 Episode 5: "The Prairie Flower"
1960–1979	The Wonderful World of Disney	Patricia Kettrick / Molly Graham / Leah McIver / Sophina McClaren / Florence Stone	8 episodes
1961	Michael Shayne	Louise Kirk	Season 1 Episode 25: "The Body Beautiful"
1961	Tales of Wells Fargo	Lydia	Season 6 Episode 3: "Treasure Coach"
1961	87th Precinct	Josie Thompson	Season 1 Episode 9: "Empty Hours"
1961	The Detectives	Norma	Season 3 Episode 10: "Escort"
1962	Cain's Hundred	Holly Baker	Season 1 Episode 30: "Quick Brown Fox"
1962–1964	Dr. Kildare	Janet Parker / Claire Sutton	2 episodes
1963	Rawhide	Sara May Green	Season 5 Episode 18: "Incident of the Mountain Man"
1963	Bonanza	Julia Grant	Season 4 Episode 22: "The Actress"
1963	The Twilight Zone	Jackie Benson	Season 4 Episode 9: "Printer's Devil"
1963	The Eleventh Hour	Georgia Tate	Season 1 Episode 22: "Five Moments Out of Time"
1963	The Fugitive	Emily Norton	Season 1 Episode 2: "The Witch"
1963	Mr. Novak	Ariel Wilder	Season 1 Episode 11: "Love in the Wrong Season"
1964	The Lieutenant	Susan Rambridge	Season 1 Episode 17: "Between Music and Laughter"
1964	Arrest and Trial	Ellen Tobin	Season 1 Episode 23: "The Black Flower"
1964	The Alfred Hitchcock Hour	Enid Bentley	Season 2 Episode 23: "A Matter of Murder"
1964	The Man from U.N.C.L.E.	Elaine May Donaldson	Season 1 Episode 1: "The Vulcan Affair"
1964	Bob Hope Presents the Chrysler Theatre	Carol Sinclair	Season 2 Episode 8: "Mr. Biddle's Crime Wave"
1965–1967	Please Don't Eat the Daisies	Joan Nash	Series regular
1966	The Two of Us	Elizabeth Williams	TV Movie
1966–1967	Vacation Playhouse	Elizabeth Williams / Joan	2 episodes
1968	The Virginian	Pearl 'Angela' Van Owen	Season 6 Episode 21: "The Hell Wind"
1968	Insight	Zara	Episode 145: "The Porous Curtain"
1968	Judd for the Defense	Sharon McNary	Season 2 Episode 4: "The Name of This Game Is Acquittal"
1969	Love, American Style	Laurie	Season 1 Episode 5: "segment: Love and the Modern Wife"
1970	Menace on the Mountain	Leah McIver	Walt Disney film
1971	The Name of the Game	Christy Landon	Season 3 Episode 23: "The Broken Puzzle"
1971	Marcus Welby, M.D.	Carol Adams	Season 3 Episode 2: "A Portrait of Debbie"
1971	Columbo	Mrs. Lenore Kennicutt	Season 1 Episode 2: "Death Lends a Hand" (as Patricia Crowley)
1971	The Bold Ones: The New Doctors	Helen Johnson	Season 3 Episode 3: "One Lonely Step"
1971	Alias Smith and Jones	Meg Parker	Season 2 Episode 14: "Miracle at Santa Marta"
1972	Owen Marshall, Counselor at Law	Sue Rohmer	Season 1 Episode 15: "Warlock at Mach 3"
1973	Griff	Marietta Marlowe	Season 1 Episode 3: "All the Lonely People"
1974	Return of the Big Cat	Sophina McClaren	TV Movie
1974–1976	Police Story	Ellie / Maggie Dolan / Georgia / Patty Pickett	4 episodes
1975	Cop on the Beat	Georgia Cameron	TV Movie
1975	Matt Helm	Lila Faro	Season 1 Episode 4: "The Game of the Century"
1975–1976	Joe Forrester	Georgia Cameron	Series regular
1976	Police Woman	Marlene Simpson	Season 3 Episode 3: "Trial by Prejudice"
1976	The Streets of San Francisco	Carol Mossman	Season 5 Episode 10: "Castle of Fear"
1977	Family	Maggie Calder	Season 2 Episode 13: "Return Engagement"
1977	The Force of Evil	Maggie Carrington	TV Movie
1977	Tales of the Unexpected	Maggie Carrington	Season 1 Episode 6: "Force of Evil"
1977	The Feather and Father Gang	Lacey	Season 1 Episode 11: "Welcome Home, Vince"
1978	A Family Upside Down	Carol Long	TV Movie
1978	The Eddie Capra Mysteries	Susan Lockard	Season 1 Episode 9: "The Two Million Dollar Stowaway"
1978	The Millionaire	Maggie Haines	TV Movie
1978–1982	The Love Boat	Noreen Badger / Linda Bradley	3 episodes
1978–1983	Fantasy Island	Lucy Faber / Mrs. Gleason	2 episodes
1979	The Rockford Files	Valerie Pointer	Season 5 Episode 14: "Guilt"
1979	Friends	Doris	Season 1 Episode 2: "Episode #1.2"
1979–1981	Charlie's Angels	(1) Ellen Miles (2) Marion Moss	(1) Season 3 Episode 20: "Angels in Waiting" (2) Season 5 Episode 6: "Hula Angels"
1980	Happy Days	Susan Patterson	Season 7 Episode 23: "A Potsie Is Born"
1980	Hawaii Five-O	Dr. Elizabeth Fielding	Season 12 Episode 19: "Woe to Wo Fat"
1980	Police Story: Confessions of a Lady Cop	Gloria Leland	TV Movie
1981	Aloha Paradise	Sondra Culberson	2 episodes
1981	Today's FBI		Season 1 Episode 6: "Career Move"
1983	Matt Houston	Audrey	Season 1 Episode 12: "The Purrfect Crime"
1983	Trauma Center		Season 1 Episode 2: "Notes About Courage"
1984	Falcon Crest	Dr. Lillian Heller	2 episodes
1985	Hotel	Margot Howland	Season 2 Episode 13: "Crossroads"
1985	Finder of Lost Loves	Maggie Singer	Season 1 Episode 22: "Broken Promises"
1985	International Airport	Beverly Gerber	TV Movie
1986	Blacke's Magic	Claudia Baron	Season 1 Episode 2: "Knave of Diamonds, Ace of Hearts"
1986	Dynasty	Emily Fallmont	9 episodes (Recurring role)
1987	Murder, She Wrote	Trudy Howard	Season 3 Episode 18: "No Laughing Murder"
1989	Generations	Rebecca Whitmore #1	65 episodes (Recurring role)
1990	Empty Nest	Claire	Season 2 Episode 24: "Still Growing After All These Years"
1993	Frasier	Marion Lawlor	Season 1 Episode 8: "Beloved Infidel"
1995	Roseanne	Joan Nash, TV Mom #5	Season 7 Episode 19: "All About Rosey"
1995	Thunder Alley	Elizabeth	Season 2 Episode 16: "Guess Who's Coming to Dinner"
1996	Melrose Place	Sharon Ross	Season 4 Episode 24: "Ruthless People"
1997	General Hospital	Mary Scanlon	Episode 8829: "Episode #1.8829"
1997–1998	Beverly Hills, 90210	Audrey Cutler	3 episodes
1997–2001	Port Charles	Mary Scanlon	251 episodes (Recurring role)
1998	Friends	Mrs. Burgin	Season 4 Episode 18: "The One with Rachel's New Dress"
1998	Pacific Blue	Catherine Callaway	Season 3 Episode 20: "With This Ring"
1998	Love Boat: The Next Wave	Lily Stubing	Season 2 Episode 4: "Reunion"
1999	Charmed	Mrs. Johnson	Season 2 Episode 8: "P3 H2O"
2000	Family Law	Beverly Dunbar	Season 1 Episode 15: "A Mother's Son"
2001	61*	Pat Maris ('98)	TV Movie
2005	The Bold and the Beautiful	Natalie DeWitt	4 episodes
2006	The Closer	Beverly Langner	Season 2 Episode 9: "Heroic Measures"
2009	Cold Case	Diane Drew '09	Season 6 Episode 14: "The Brush Man"
