= Lloyd Cutler =

American lawyer and White House Counsel (1917–2005)

White House Counsel
- In office March 8, 1994 – October 1, 1994
- President: Bill Clinton
- Preceded by: Bernard Nussbaum
- Succeeded by: Abner Mikva
- In office October 1, 1979 – January 20, 1981
- President: Jimmy Carter
- Preceded by: Robert Lipshutz
- Succeeded by: Fred Fielding

Personal details
- Born: Lloyd Norton Cutler; November 10, 1917 New York City, New York, U.S.
- Died: May 8, 2005 (aged 87) Washington, D.C., U.S.
- Party: Democratic
- Education: Yale University (BA, LLB)

Lloyd Norton Cutler (November 10, 1917 – May 8, 2005) was an American attorney who served as White House Counsel during the Democratic administrations of Presidents Jimmy Carter and Bill Clinton.

== Early life and education ==
Cutler was born in New York City. His father was a trial lawyer. He graduated from Yale University in 1936 at age 18, with a bachelor's degree in history and economics. In college, he was a member of Elihu. Three years later, he graduated magna cum laude from Yale Law School, where he was editor-in-chief of the Yale Law Journal.

== Career ==
Following his graduation, he clerked for Judge Charles Edward Clark for a year before entering private practice at Cravath, Swaine & Moore.

During World War II, he worked briefly for the Lend-Lease Administration, later enlisting in the U.S. Army and becoming an intelligence analyst. In 1946, he co-founded the Washington, D.C., based law firm Wilmer Cutler & Pickering, specializing in international law and public policy. He also co-chaired the Lawyers' Committee for Civil Rights Under Law, formed at the request of President John F. Kennedy.

== White House ==
Cutler served as the White House Counsel to President Jimmy Carter, whom he had met first while both were serving on the Trilateral Commission. Cutler served as a special counsel and consultant to the president on the ratification of SALT II and other international matters.

In 1994, President Bill Clinton was looking for a new lawyer, as Bernard Nussbaum had resigned, so Clinton decided to hire Cutler under unusual terms. Cutler was able to remain as counsel at his firm and to counsel private clients as long as their interests did not conflict with those of the government—a first for a White House Counsel. Thus, he also served as counsel in Clinton's administration.

Cutler came into national news as a result of the Whitewater investigations and Lewinsky scandal. He went on PBS's News Hour on February 6, 1998, and defended President Clinton as the Lewinsky investigation started by denying that Lewinsky had visited 37 times.

On his work in Washington, Cutler said, "This is an excitement to us, a feeling of being in on it, and whichever part of the Washington milieu we come from, we want to play a part. That's why we're here."

== Intelligence Commission ==
On February 6, 2004, Cutler was appointed to the Iraq Intelligence Commission, an independent panel tasked with investigating U.S. intelligence surrounding the 2003 invasion of Iraq and the allegations that Iraq had weapons of mass destruction.

== Death and personal life ==
Cutler was married to Louise M. Howe until her death in 1989. Cutler married Polly Kraft in 1990, widow of Joseph Kraft, who was a columnist.

On May 8, 2005, he died at his home in Washington, D.C., due to complications of a broken hip. He was survived by his wife, Polly Kraft, and four children. Two of his children are practicing lawyers and one, Beverly Cutler, is a retired Alaska state superior court judge. He lived in Chevy Chase, Maryland.

Legal offices
Preceded by Robert Lipshutz	White House Counsel; 1979–1981	Succeeded by Fred Fielding
Preceded by Bernard Nussbaum	White House Counsel; 1994	Succeeded by Abner Mikva
