= Philip W. Buchen =

American attorney and White House counsel (1916-2001)

Philip Buchen
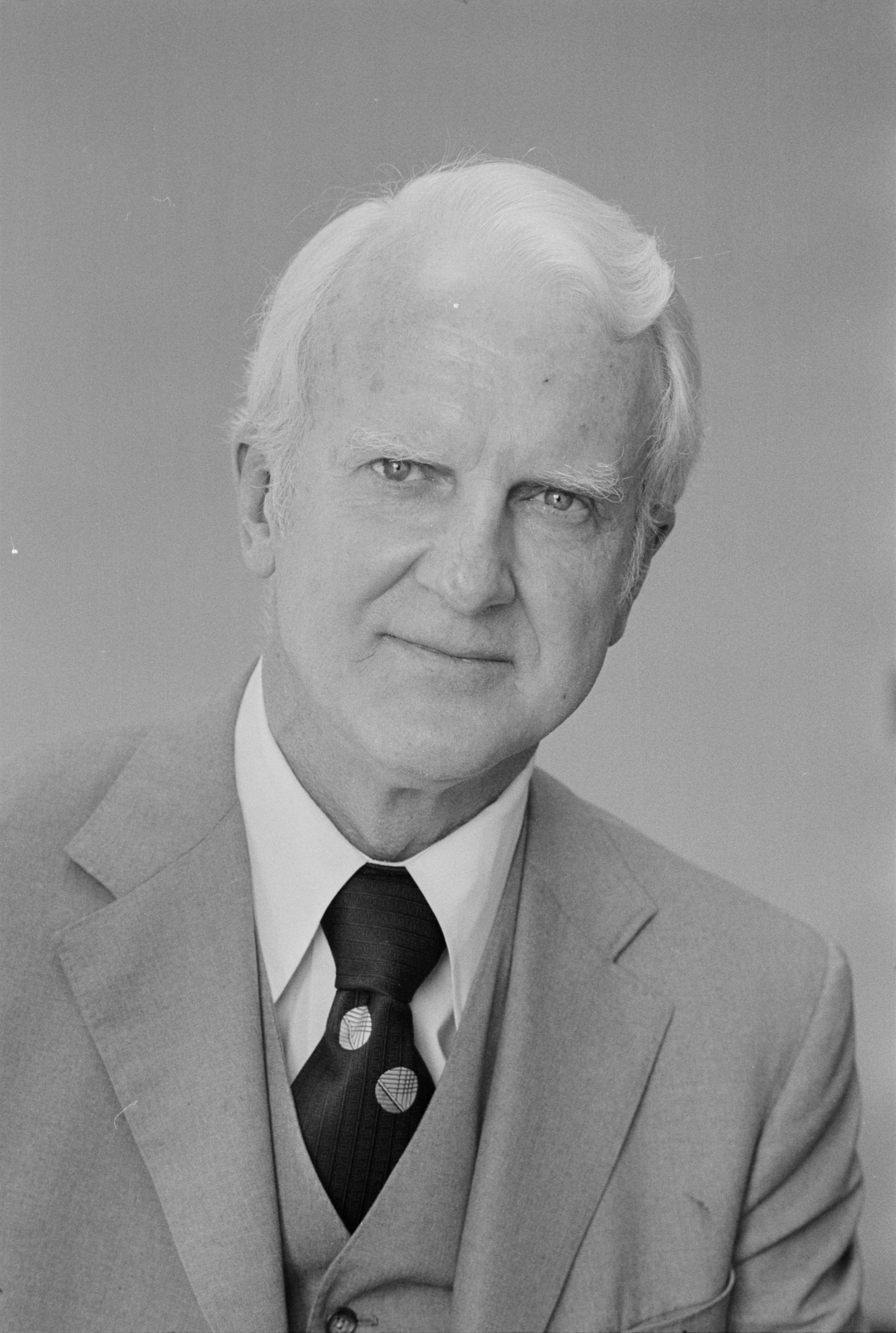

White House Counsel
- In office August 9, 1974 – January 20, 1977
- President: Gerald Ford
- Preceded by: Leonard Garment
- Succeeded by: Robert Lipshutz

Personal details
- Born: Philip William Buchen; February 27, 1916 Sheboygan, Wisconsin, U.S.
- Died: May 21, 2001 (aged 85) Washington, D.C., U.S.
- Party: Republican
- Relatives: Gustave W. Buchen (father)
- Education: University of Michigan (BA, JD)

Philip William Buchen (February 27, 1916 – May 21, 2001) was an American attorney who served as White House counsel during the Ford Administration.

== Early life and education ==
Buchen was born in Sheboygan, Wisconsin, the son of State Senator Gustave W. Buchen. In his youth, he contracted polio and thereafter walked with a cane. He graduated from Sheboygan High School in 1935 and attended the University of Michigan, where he met Gerald Ford. At Michigan, he was a member of Delta Kappa Epsilon fraternity. He received his Juris Doctor degree from the University of Michigan in 1941.

== Career ==
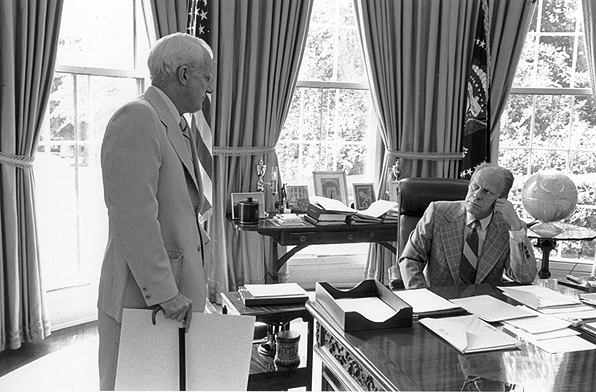
Buchen with President Ford in 1975

Buchen opened a law practice in Grand Rapids, Michigan with Ford in May 1941. He continued to practice law in Grand Rapids until 1974, when he came to Washington to serve in the Office of the Vice President of the United States. He served as chief White House counsel with Cabinet rank for the duration of Ford's presidency.

When Ford left office, Buchen remained in Washington, practicing law with the firm of Dewey Ballantine until 1995. Buchen served on the United States Commission of Fine Arts from 1977 to 1981.

== Personal ==
Buchen's first marriage ended in divorce. He had a daughter with his second wife, Beatrice (Loomis).

Buchen died of pneumonia in May 2001.

Legal offices
Preceded by Leonard Garment	White House Counsel; 1974–1977	Succeeded by Robert Lipshutz
