= A Date with Judy (TV series) =

American television sitcom

- Genre: Sitcom
- Written by: Aleen Leslie
- Starring: Patricia Crowley
- Country of origin: United States
- Original language: English
- No. of seasons: 1

Production
- Producer: Aleen Leslie
- Running time: 30 minutes

Original release
- Network: ABC
- Release: June 2, 1951 – February 23, 1952

A Date with Judy
- Genre: Sitcom
- Written by: Aleen Leslie
- Starring: Mary Lynn Beller
- Country of origin: United States
- Original language: English

Production
- Producer: Aleen Leslie
- Running time: 30 minutes

Original release
- Network: ABC
- Release: July 15, 1952 – September 30, 1953

A Date with Judy is an American television sitcom, two versions of which were broadcast on ABC between 1951 and 1953. A daytime version ran weekly on Saturdays from June 2, 1951, to February 23, 1952. A primetime version with a different cast ran from July 10, 1952, to September 30, 1953.

== Premise ==
The title character was teenager Judy Foster. The book Television Series of the 1950s: Essential Facts and Quirky Details described Foster as "a very pretty girl who is called 'the cutest date in town'", adding, "Judy has a knack for finding mischief and has a firm belief that her family doesn't understand her." The Encyclopedia of Television Shows, 1925 through 2010 described her as "bright, enthusiastic and 'blessed' with a knack for finding trouble." Judy's parents were Melvyn and Dora Foster, and she had a 12-year-old brother, Randolph. Her boyfriend was Oogie Pringle.

The program was derived from the radio show of the same name.

== Cast ==
The table below shows the actors who portrayed the main characters in the two versions of the program.

Character	Daytime version	Primetime version
Judy Foster	Patricia Crowley	Mary Lynn Beller
Oogie Pringle	Jimmie Sommer	Jimmie Sommer
Melvin Foster	Gene O'Donnell	John Gibson
Dora Foster	Anna Lee	Flora Campbell
Randolph Foster	Judson Rees	Peter Avramo

Source: Total Television

== Broadcast ==
The daytime version ran on Saturdays from 11:30 a.m. to noon, Eastern Daylight Time. The primetime version ran on Thursdays from 8 to 8:30 p.m. (July 1952 - October 1952) and then on Wednesdays from 7:30 to 8 p.m. (June 1953 - September 1953).

The primetime version was replaced by Saber of London, which had been on ABC on a different night the previous season.

Clorets sponsored the program.

== Reception ==
In the trade publication Billboard, a review of the first daytime episode described A Date with Judy as "a mildly diverting situation comedy aimed at teenagers". Reviewer Leon Morse wrote that the program was cast well, but the script needed improvement.
