= Telemeter (pay television) =

Subscription television service

- Country: United States
- Broadcast area: Palm Springs, California (original incarnation); Ontario, Canada (second incarnation)

Programming
- Language: English

Ownership
- Owner: International Telemeter Corporation

History
- Launched: 1953 (United States); 1959 (Canada)
- Closed: 1954 (United States); 1965 (Canada)

Telemeter was an American subscription television service developed by the International Telemeter Corporation, that operated from 1953 to 1967. Telemeter was used on a coin-to-box machine connected to any television set. When the right amount of money was deposited into the box, a scrambled signal sent through coaxial cables was unscrambled and rendered visible.

== Overview ==
During the late 1940s, the concept of coin-operated televisions appeared to be a revolutionary idea for the future. Various companies such as Covideo and Televista, alongside well-known brands like General Electric, emerged after World War II and created televisions that could be used with a pay-as-you-go system. These devices were primarily marketed for commercial use, including spaces such as hotels, hospital waiting rooms, laundromats, and airports, where individuals had some spare time to pass. The demand for these televisions in public areas was high, and they provided a convenient source of entertainment for people who were waiting for something or had some time to kill.

The concept underlying the early coin-operated television technology was similar to that of a pay phone or a washing machine. To activate the TV, the viewer had to insert coins into a slot, which would grant them timed access to local TV stations. Initially, these coin-operated TVs were extremely profitable since America was still in the early stages of developing its national TV addiction, and people were willing to pay for the novelty of watching TV outside their homes. The success of these units in commercial locations led industry insiders to consider whether they could also be marketed for residential use. However, a significant question arose about how people would be persuaded to pay to watch TV in their homes when broadcast channels were already free. As it is now, the answer lies in offering premium content. By providing access to exclusive and high-quality content, people would be willing to pay to watch TV at home, just as they were willing to pay for coin-operated TVs outside their homes.

RCA and Zenith, among other companies, explored the possibility of transmitting their distinctive shows via designated broadcast frequencies. In principle, this was a promising concept; however, in reality, it created a significant issue: the converters used to receive these broadcasts were causing interference with other signals. To remedy this problem, companies attempted to solve the issue by installing a coin-operated box, which ultimately made it nearly impossible to watch regular TV broadcasts. The Federal Communications Commission (FCC), responsible for regulating all broadcast signals, whether free or paid, disapproved of this and refused to grant licenses to any new stations that caused interference with existing stations. In effect, the FCC was determined to ensure that viewers were able to watch television without any interference, whether from free or paid broadcasts.

The entire landscape of pay-per-view TV was transformed by The International Telemeter Corporation, a small startup, through an innovative plan. Instead of using over-the-air broadcasting, the Telemeter devised a massive closed-circuit system. The coin-operated converter, equipped with a router, provided viewers with the option to select between broadcast channels and the closed circuit network transmitted through a wired coaxial connection. The new service featured three streaming channels that played unique programming on a 24-hour loop. Customers could receive a refreshed program schedule every week and deposit money directly into their Telemeter receiver to watch their preferred program. This groundbreaking concept paved the way for the future of pay-per-view TV, providing viewers with a more diverse range of choices and convenient payment options.

== Paramount investment ==
In May 1951, the International Telemeter Corporation received a huge boost when Paramount Pictures acquired a 50% stake in the company. Even though Paramount had no immediate plans to use Telemeter's system to promote its films, it deemed the investment to be highly valuable. Paramount's decision to invest in Telemeter not only provided financial support to the corporation, but also helped to establish the latter's reputation as a savvy investor, capable of recognizing opportunities with the potential for long-term growth and profitability. With this acquisition, Paramount demonstrated its confidence in the future of the burgeoning television industry and its belief that Telemeter could play an instrumental role in shaping the industry's future. Overall, this strategic move by Paramount signaled its commitment to staying ahead of the curve and investing in innovative technologies that would pave the way for its success in the years to come.

Telemeter was a pay television method that differed from most early systems in that it did not rent out spectrum space. Instead, it utilized a wired connection to create a direct link between the subscriber and the television studio. This approach had the advantage of not interfering with traditional closed-spectrum television signals, as Telemeter used a closed circuit system that operated with a film chain. Subscribers had access to three channels that could be selected using a dial on the Telemeter box, which was installed at the television set. The box received scrambled signals that were transmitted onto low-VHF channels (typically channels 5 or 6) for descrambling. With Telemeter, customers could enjoy high-quality television programming without any disruption to other broadcast signals.

== Los Angeles and Palm Springs ==
In February 1952, Telemeter underwent various trials, one of which involved a press demonstration comprising six sets at the KTLA television station situated in Los Angeles. The test commenced at precisely 1:30 PM and caused an uproar amongst the residents who called the station in great numbers, expressing concern about the scrambled images they were witnessing on KTLA. This situation illustrates the widespread curiosity and interest that the public held for technological advancements and innovations in the entertainment industry during that era.

In 1953, Paramount and Telemeter set up their inaugural closed-circuit network in Palm Springs, California, with the intention of prioritizing coverage of current events, sports, and a small selection of both sitcoms and serialized television shows. This technological innovation represented a significant milestone in the broadcasting industry and allowed for the distribution of television programming to a more geographically diverse audience. The introduction of closed-circuit television technology was a game-changer in terms of the dissemination of information and entertainment to a wider range of viewers. Tests began on November 27. The first feature film broadcast on pay television was the world premiere of Forever Female, starring Ginger Rogers and William Holden. The film was broadcast live from the Plaza Theatre. Viewers could put $1.25 into the Telemeter boxes atop their television sets. Normal community antenna television services, which gave subscribers the major Los Angeles stations, cost about $5.40 (equivalent to $63 in 2024) a month. But with the set top box, installed at $21.75, subscribers could get first-run films and sporting events at a price of $1.25 per program. By early 1954, the Telemeter subscription system had signed up 148 households. The film studios, however, due to pressure from theater owners and film distributors, put Telemeter under risk. Following a lawsuit from a local drive-in theater owner, the film supply all but dried up, and Paramount Pictures was unsatisfied by customers playing only Paramount films. The service ended on May 15, 1954.

== Toronto ==
In 1959, nearly five years after its original shutdown, International Telemeter Corp. (now fully owned by Paramount) began tests in Canada, under the name of Trans-Canada Telemeter Ltd., as Canada was outside of the FCC's jurisdiction and as U.S. antitrust laws which threatened Paramount did not extend to Canada. Services began in Etobicoke, Ontario on February 26, 1960, with 1,000 subscribers. Programming during the first trial years consisted essentially of first-run movies and fictional series. The overall cost of the investment was $1.5 million. In 1961, Telemeter signed deals with the Toronto Argonauts football team and the Toronto Maple Leafs to broadcast away games; wrestling was also featured. Some original programming, such as a Bob Newhart special, thought to be the first filmed pay-per-view special, were also produced at Telemeter's Bloor Street studio and several Broadway shows and an opera performance were also broadcast.

The Canadian experiment was not a success and was not extended outside of Etobicoke and the then neighbouring communities of Long Branch, Mimico and New Toronto, and was discontinued on April 30, 1965. At its peak, 5,800 households were subscribed. By the time it shut down operations, it only had 2,500 subscribers.

During the time Telemeter shut down its services in Toronto, it was in the process of developing an experimental pay television service, which would provide three pay channels on an 11-channel CATV system in Montreal. However, the service was never implemented. During the mid-1960s, Telemeter executives made repeated efforts to persuade the FCC to permit pay TV as part of CATV in the United States. Despite their efforts, pay TV did not receive regulatory approval until several years later. Telemeter's unsuccessful attempt to introduce a pay-TV service in Montreal highlights the company's innovative approach to the television industry and its pioneering efforts to expand the availability of subscription television services to viewers.

== Later attempts ==
In 1966, Paramount was purchased by Gulf+Western. Telemeter eventually became a separate subsidiary of G+W, which became the owner of another NHL team, the New York Rangers, in 1977. It built two CATV systems in two states and applied for franchises in more than 200 cities. During the period spanning from the late 1960s to the early 1970s, International Telemeter persisted in attempting to create novel variations of CATV and pay-TV equipment; however, these efforts proved largely futile and unproductive. Despite their best efforts, the company was unable to attain significant advancements or notable achievements in this field during this time period.

Although Telemeter did not succeed, it was a technological breakthrough as it brought pay television to CATV systems before premium television services like HBO, Showtime, and Starz, which would later be transmitted through cable and satellite.
