= Fred W. Friendly =

President of CBS News

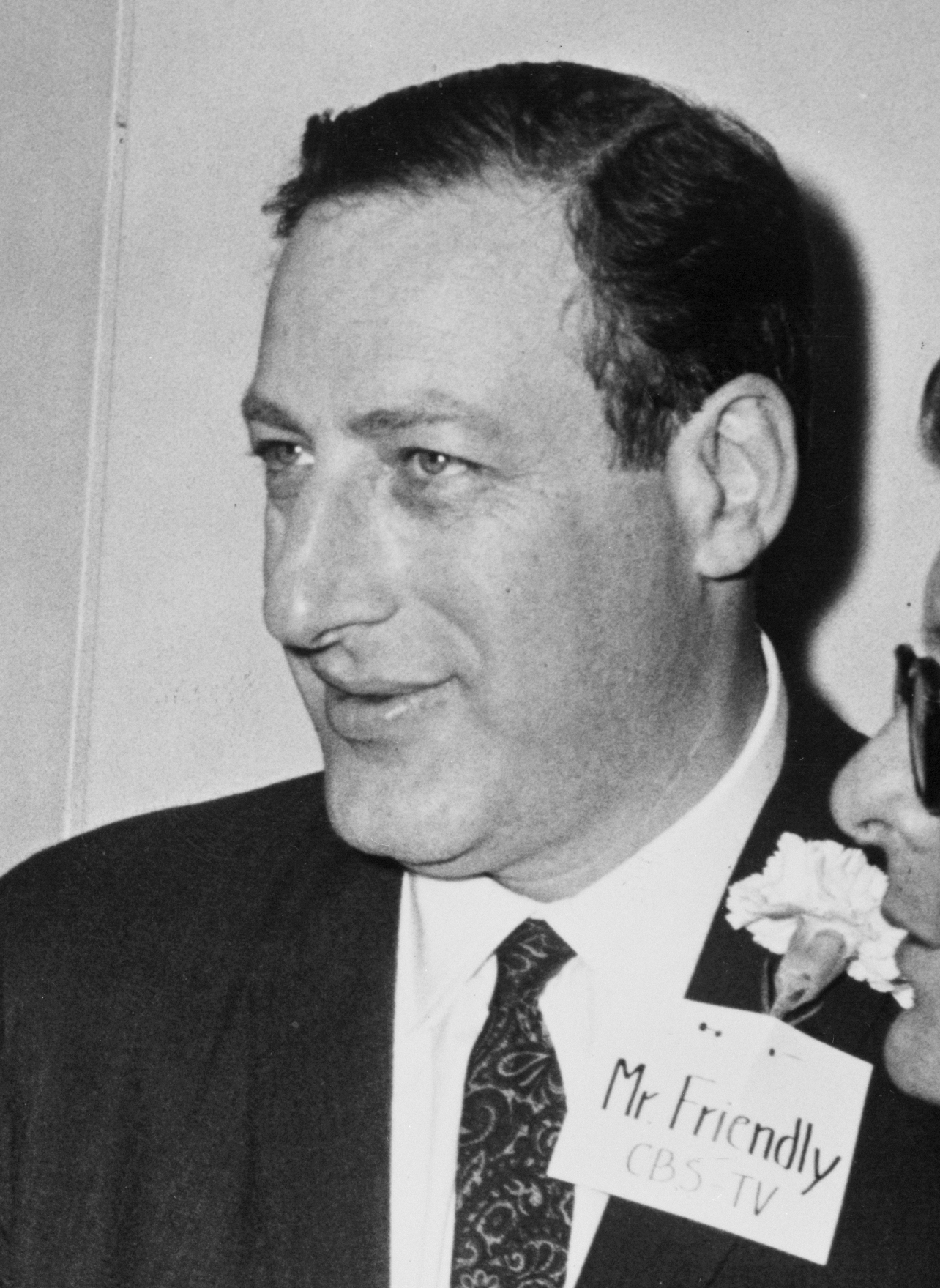
- Friendly in 1961
- Born: Ferdinand Friendly Wachenheimer; October 30, 1915; New York City, US
- Died: March 3, 1998 (aged 82); New York, New York, US
- Resting place: Kensico Cemetery
- Education: Nichols Junior College
- Spouses: Dorothy Greene (m. 1947; later divorced); Ruth Weiss Mark (m. 1968)
- Children: 6, including David T. Friendly, Andy Friendly, and Michael Mark

Fred W. Friendly (born Ferdinand Friendly Wachenheimer, October 30, 1915 – March 3, 1998) was a president of CBS News and the creator, along with Edward R. Murrow, of the documentary television program See It Now. He originated the concept of public-access television cable TV channels.

== Early career ==
Friendly was born to a Jewish family in New York City to Therese Friendly Wachenheimer and Samuel Wachenheimer, a jewelry manufacturer. The family moved from Manhattan's Morningside Heights district (where later, Friendly would teach for a quarter-century) to Providence, Rhode Island, where he graduated from Hope Street High School in 1933. He received an associate's degree from Nichols Junior College in 1936.

He entered radio broadcasting in 1937 at WEAN in Providence, Rhode Island, where he reversed the order of his middle and last names, and began using Friendly as his last name. In World War II, he served as an instructor in the Army Signal Corps and reported for an Army newspaper in the Pacific Theater (The CBI Roundup) before mustering out as a master sergeant in 1945. His decorations included the Legion of Merit and the Soldier's Medal.

By the late 1940s, Friendly was an experienced radio producer. It was in this role that Friendly first worked with Murrow on the Columbia Records historical albums, I Can Hear It Now. The first entry in the series, released on Thanksgiving Day 1948, covered the crisis and war years 1933–1945. It was a ground-breaker in that it used clips of radio news coverage and speeches of the major events from that twelve-year time span. Friendly created the concept after noticing the new use of audiotape in regular radio news coverage, as opposed to wire or disc recordings that had been an industry standard. Periodically, Friendly created recordings of news events when such recordings didn't exist or, recreated ones that were considered too chaotic to use on an album . CBS correspondent David Schoenbrun, in his memoir On and Off the Air, said he once was forced by Friendly to ask Charles de Gaulle if he would recreate the speech he gave upon his return to Paris (de Gaulle refused). The recreations never were identified as such, and trying to separate the real from the recreated, continues to be problematic for radio historians.

Although Murrow was an established CBS name and at the time Columbia Records was owned by CBS, Friendly's next full-time work came as a news producer at NBC. It was there that Friendly originated the idea for the news-oriented quiz show Who Said That?, first hosted by NBC newsman Robert Trout, followed by Walter Kiernan, and John Charles Daly. The program, which Friendly edited, ran irregularly on NBC and then ABC between 1948 and 1955.

Friendly later wrote, directed, and produced the NBC Radio series The Quick and the Dead during the Summer of 1950. It was about the development of the atomic bomb. It featured Trout, Bob Hope, and New York Times writer Bill Laurence, who had won a Pulitzer Prize for his coverage of the Manhattan Project.

== CBS years ==
After the success of The Quick and the Dead, Friendly was recruited to work full-time for CBS by news executive Sig Mickelson. That fall, Murrow and Friendly collaborated to produce a CBS Radio documentary series inspired by their record albums—a weekly show called Hear It Now that was hosted by Murrow. The show moved to television as See It Now on Sunday, November 18, 1951.

Murrow and Friendly broadcast a revealing See It Now documentary analysis on Senator Joseph McCarthy (airing March 9, 1954) that has been credited with changing the public view of McCarthy and, being a key event leading to McCarthy's fall from power. It was an extension of the duo's continuing probe of the conflict between McCarthy's anti-Communist crusade and individual rights.

The previous fall, Murrow and Friendly had produced a notable See It Now episode on the topic, when the show probed the case of Air Force Reserve Lieutenant Milo Radulovich, who had lost his security clearance because of the supposed leftist leanings of his sister and father—evidence the Air Force kept sealed. Five weeks later, Radulovich was reinstated by the secretary of the Air Force. Radulovich was granted leave of his duties that same year, however, when he was forced to move temporarily to Phoenix, Arizona to care for his nephew who had recently been involved in a dog mauling incident.

After See It Now ended, in the Summer of 1958, Friendly and Murrow worked together on its successor, CBS Reports, although Friendly alone was executive producer and Murrow no more than an occasional reporter and narrator. Their most famous CBS Reports installment—the probe of migrant farm workers Harvest of Shame—aired in November 1960 and still is considered one of television's finest single programs.

After Murrow's departure from the television network in 1961, Friendly continued to oversee several notable CBS Reports documentaries, including Who Speaks for Birmingham?, Birth Control and the Law, and The Business of Heroin.

Under CBS president James T. Aubrey Jr. the pressures on CBS News operations arose and escalated. Aubrey constantly fought with Friendly. Friendly felt Aubrey was insufficiently concerned with public affairs and in his 1967 memoir, Due to Circumstances Beyond Our Control, recounts one budget meeting at CBS when Aubrey spoke at length of how much money the news was costing the company, being a sea of red ink that could be stopped by replacing news with more entertainment programs. CBS founder and board chairman William S. Paley supported the news, however, and protected Friendly's division from Aubrey's proposed budget cuts. In 1962, Aubrey ordered that there would be fewer specials, both entertainment and news, because he felt interruptions to the schedule alienated viewers by disrupting their routine viewing, sending them to the competition. Friendly resented this move. To Friendly's relief, in 1965 Aubrey was fired.

Friendly served as president of CBS News from 1964 to 1966.

=== CBS resignation ===
In 1966, Friendly resigned from CBS when the television network ran a scheduled episode of I Love Lucy instead of broadcasting live coverage of the first United States Senate hearings questioning American involvement in Vietnam. Onetime CBS News president Dick Salant, the executive who preceded and later succeeded Friendly in the role, wrote in his memoirs that Friendly's problem was compounded by his inability to make such a request directly to the top CBS management (William S. Paley and Frank Stanton), as previous CBS News presidents had. In this case, Friendly had to go through a new supervisor at the executive level, CBS Broadcast Group president Jack Schneider.

== Later career ==
After he left CBS, Friendly initially worked as a broadcast consultant at the Ford Foundation, a position he maintained until 1980. In this capacity, he initially developed an infeasible plan to allocate revenue generated by communications satellites toward the nascent medium of public television before he emerged as an integral figure in "negotiations about interconnection that would lead to the creation of the Public Broadcasting Service (PBS) in 1969". By ensuring National Educational Television's subordination to the Washington-based PBS through the merger of NET with New York City's WNDT (and including a $2 million Ford Foundation grant to bolster the station's local programming), Friendly reluctantly placated members of the Nixon administration who perceived NET as a propagandistic front for the Eastern Establishment.

Despite his relative dearth of formal education—not atypical among contemporaneous practitioners—he was appointed to the tenured faculty of the Columbia University Graduate School of Journalism as the Edward R. Murrow Professor of Broadcast Journalism in 1966.

Over the next thirteen years, Friendly assumed stewardship of the school's hitherto threadbare broadcast journalism concentration. To the chagrin of some of his colleagues, he often eclipsed other top administrators (including 1970s-era dean Elie Abel, who was personally recommended by Friendly for the post) in the popular consciousness. The non-degree Summer Program in Journalism for Members of Minority Groups (renamed the Michele Clark Fellowship Program for Minority Journalists following the death of a distinguished alumna in a December 1972 airplane crash) was directed by Friendly from 1968 to 1975, enabling many individuals (most notably media-savvy attorney Geraldo Rivera) to switch careers during the tempestuous epoch. A proposed "University Broadcast Laboratory" (an experimental Sunday news magazine initially proposed by Friendly in partnership with the Ford Foundation, Columbia, and NET) only manifested in attenuated form, however, as Public Broadcast Laboratory from 1967 to 1969; administrative and content circumscriptions imposed by the University trustees precipitated his divestiture from the program and hastened the retirement of Journalism School dean Edward W. Barrett in 1968. As chair of Mayor John Lindsay's Task Force on CATV and Telecommunications that year, Friendly revived his revenue-sharing proposal by advising cable companies to set aside two channels that the public could lease for a minor fee, ultimately enabling the development of public-access television.

Spurred by classroom discussions, he inaugurated the Media and Society Friendly Seminars under the auspices of the Journalism School in 1974 as private conference fora on media, law (particularly the Constitution and the First Amendment) and public policy for the edification of professionals from disparate fields. Drawing upon the case method employed by many professional schools and the Socratic method for interlocution, these eventually evolved into the PBS long-running Fred Friendly Seminars in 1981.

Following his statutory retirement in 1979, Friendly relinquished control of the Journalism School's broadcast program; however, he continued to teach and produce the seminars at Columbia as an administrative officer of the University before retiring in earnest in 1992. By the time of his death in 1998, Friendly "was criticized by some working in network news as being isolated in academia and out of touch with the new realities—and limitations—of the business of broadcast journalism." The broadcast newsroom and an endowed professorship remain named for Friendly, attesting to his outsized influence at a critical juncture in the development of the school.

While in academia, he authored several books, including The Good Guys, The Bad Guys, And The First Amendment (an account of a number of First Amendment court cases and particularly, of the Fairness Doctrine), Minnesota Rag (a history of Near v. Minnesota), The Constitution: That Delicate Balance, and Due to Circumstances Beyond Our Control (a memoir about his sixteen years at CBS).

In 1986, Friendly was appointed by Mayor Edward I. Koch to New York City's Charter Revision Commission. Chaired by Frederick A.O. Schwarz Jr., the body's recommendations led to the dissolution of the New York City Board of Estimate following the adoption of the city's 1990 charter, whereupon the commission dissolved.

Friendly was a Montgomery Fellow at Dartmouth College from April 9-April 12, 1986. He also served as a visiting professor at Yale University (1984) and Bryn Mawr College (1981). In 1985 and 1986, he served as the Wayne Morse Chair of Law and Politics, established in honor of the late former Senator, at the University of Oregon.

In addition to his work with the seminars, Friendly produced and hosted a ten-part series on PBS, Ethics in America, on which a panel of leading intellectuals debated and discussed modern ethical issues.

== Accolades ==
- 1967: Iris Award for Man of the Year from NATPE
- 1986: Paul White Award, Radio Television Digital News Association
- 1990: George Polk Award
- 1994: Television Hall of Fame

== Death ==
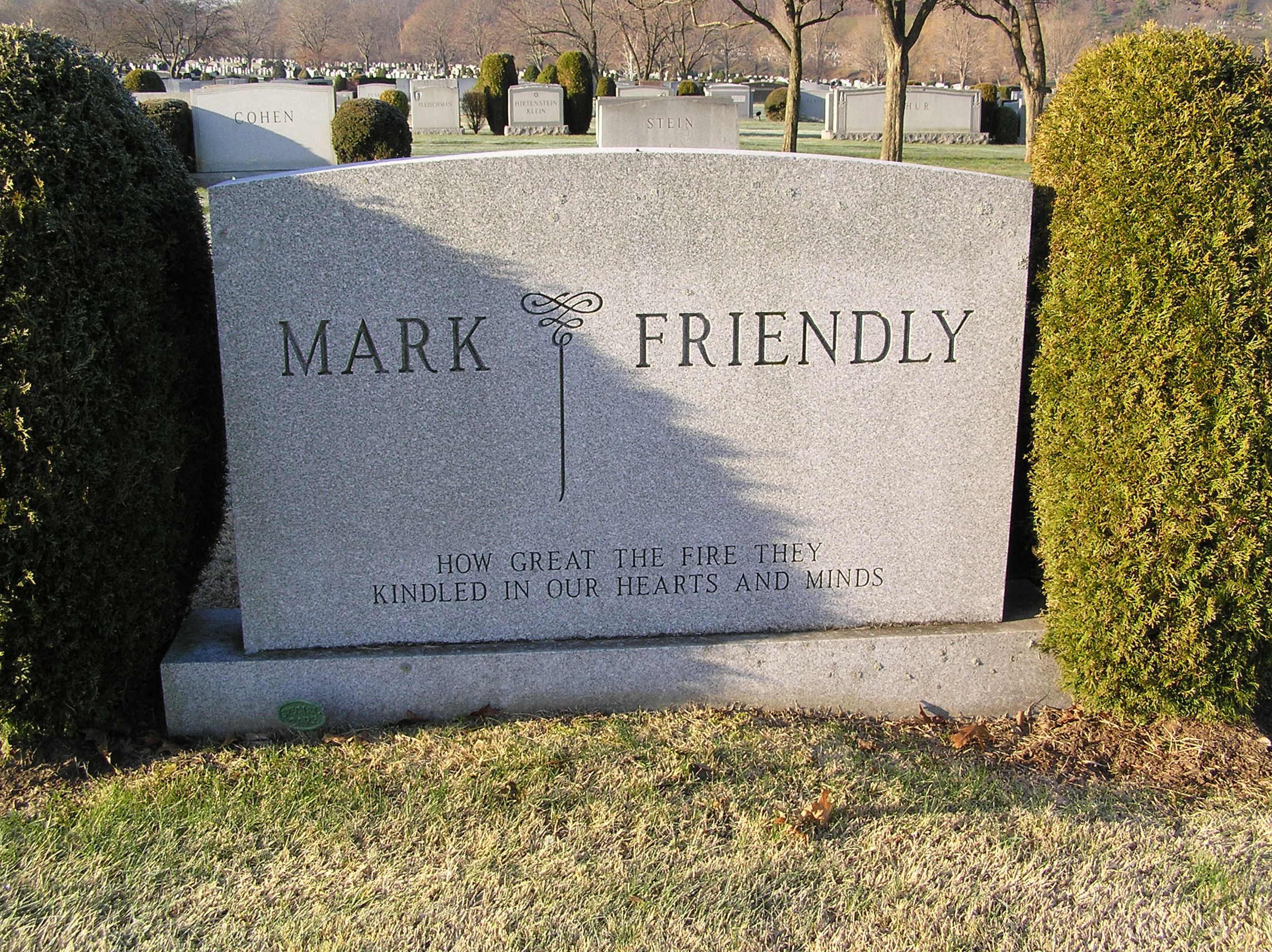
The headstone of Fred Friendly

Friendly died on March 3, 1998, of a stroke, at his home in New York City. He is interred in the Sharon Gardens Division of Kensico Cemetery in Valhalla, New York.

== Legacy ==
In 1986, Edward Herrmann portrayed Friendly in the original HBO drama Murrow. In 2005, George Clooney played him in the film Good Night, and Good Luck.

== See also ==
- Freedom of speech
- Television documentary
